= Walnut Grove =

Walnut Grove may refer to:

== Canada ==
- Walnut Grove, Langley, British Columbia

== United States ==
- Walnut Grove, Alabama
- Walnut Grove, Arizona
- Walnut Grove, Arkansas (disambiguation)
- Walnut Grove, California
- Walnut Grove Chinese-American Historic District, Walnut Grove, CA, listed on the NRHP in Sacramento County, California
- Walnut Grove Commercial/Residential Historic District, Walnut Grove, CA, listed on the NRHP in Sacramento County, California
- Walnut Grove Japanese-American Historic District, Walnut Grove, CA, listed on the NRHP
- Walnut Grove (Waterford, Connecticut), listed on the NRHP
- Walnut Grove, Georgia
- Walnut Grove, McDonough County, Illinois, an unincorporated community in McDonough County
- Walnut Grove, Putnam County, Illinois, an unincorporated community in Putnam County
- Altona, Illinois, a village in Knox County formerly known as Walnut Grove
- Walnut Grove, Hamilton County, Indiana
- Walnut Grove, Warren County, Indiana
- Walnut Grove, Iowa, a community in Iowa
- Walnut Grove, Kansas
- Walnut Grove (Clarksville, Maryland), listed on the NRHP
- Walnut Grove (Cheneyville, Louisiana), listed on the NRHP
- Walnut Grove (Mer Rouge, Louisiana), listed on the NRHP
- Walnut Grove, Minnesota (home of Laura Ingalls Wilder, author of Little House on the Prairie)
- Walnut Grove, Mississippi
- Walnut Grove, Missouri
- Walnut Grove (Tar Heel, North Carolina), listed on the NRHP
- Walnut Grove, Ohio
- Walnut Grove, Pennsylvania, on Pennsylvania Route 849
- Walnut Grove, South Carolina
- Walnut Grove Plantation, Spartanburg, SC, listed on the NRHP
- Walnut Grove, Hardin County, Tennessee, an unincorporated community
- Walnut Grove, Sumner County, Tennessee, an unincorporated community
- Walnut Grove (Gallatin, Tennessee), listed on the NRHP
- Walnut Grove (Mount Pleasant, Tennessee), listed on the NRHP
- Walnut Grove, Collin County, Texas
- Walnut Grove, Smith County, Texas
- Walnut Grove (Bristol, Virginia), listed on the NRHP
- Walnut Grove (Spotsylvania County, Virginia), listed on the NRHP
- Walnut Grove, Virginia, the location of NRHP-listed Cyrus McCormick Farm
- Walnut Grove, Washington
- Walnut Grove (Union, West Virginia), listed on the NRHP

== See also ==
- Walnut Grove Farm (disambiguation)
- Walnut Grove School (disambiguation)
- Walnut Grove School District (disambiguation)
- Walnut Grove Township (disambiguation)
