= Al the Wop's =

Historic bar and restaurant

Coordinates: 38°15′02″N 121°30′34″W

Al the Wops
- Cat seated outside entrance to Al the Wop's
- Location: 13943 Main St, Walnut Grove, CA 95690

History
- Built: 1915

Site notes
- Website: https://www.althewops.com/

Al the Wop's (officially Al's Place) is a historic bar and restaurant located in Locke, California, within the Sacramento–San Joaquin River Delta. Established in 1934, it is notable as the first non-Chinese-owned business in Locke, a town historically built and inhabited by Chinese immigrants. Renowned for its informal charm, unique traditions, and historical significance, Al the Wop's has become a cultural landmark in the region.

== Founding ==
Al the Wop's was founded in 1934 by Al Adami, an Italian-American entrepreneur with a colorful past, including connections to bootlegging during Prohibition. The building, originally constructed in 1915 by Lee Bing and his partners as a Chinese restaurant, was acquired by Adami with funds reportedly earned from running bootlegged liquor from Collinsville and Montezuma Hills. At the time, Locke was a predominantly Chinese-American community, and Adami's establishment marked a significant cultural shift as the town's first non-Chinese-owned business.

The name "Al the Wop's" reflects Adami's Italian heritage, referencing the term "Wop," which was historically used as a derogatory slur for Italian immigrants. Adami embraced the term in a humorous and self-referential way, highlighting the bar's identity as an informal and unpretentious gathering place. The name also emphasized its distinction as the first non-Chinese establishment in Locke.

Although Al the Wop's opened after the repeal of Prohibition in 1933, the founder's bootlegging background remains a part of its lore. During Prohibition, the Sacramento–San Joaquin Delta region, including Locke, was known for its underground speakeasies and illicit liquor production.

== Traditions and culture ==
Al the Wop's is celebrated for its enduring traditions, many of which originated from Adami's vision of creating a welcoming and relaxed environment. These customs have become iconic features of the establishment:

- Necktie Cutting: Patrons wearing neckties often have them ceremonially cut off upon entering, with the remnants displayed near the entrance. This practice reflects the bar's playful rejection of formality.
- Dollar Bills on the ceiling: Visitors toss dollar bills to the ceiling, a custom that began as a way to fund community events, including an annual liver feed for local residents. The dollar-covered ceiling remains a signature feature of the bar.

These traditions, combined with the bar's rustic charm, have helped make Al the Wop's a popular destination for locals, tourists, bikers, and boaters alike.

== See also ==
- Locke Historic District
- Chinese Exclusion Act
- Sacramento–San Joaquin River Delta
- Prohibition in the United States
