= Iijima =

Iijima is a Japanese surname. Notable people with the surname include:

- Ai Iijima (1972–2008), Japanese actress, media personality
- Chris Iijima (1948–2005), American folksinger, educator and legal scholar
- Eiji Iijima (born 1979), Japanese shogi player
- Hideo Iijima (飯島 秀雄; born 1944), Japanese sprinter and baseball player
- Hiroki Iijima (born 1996), Japanese actor and model
- Junichi Iijima (born 1954), Japanese computer scientist
- Kametaro Iijima, Japanese Consul General in 1913
- Mari Iijima (born 1963), Japanese singer-songwriter
- Naoko Iijima (born 1968), Japanese actress
- Sumio Iijima (born 1939), discoverer of carbon nanotubes
- Tadashi Iijima (1902–1996), Japanese film critic
- Yukari Iijima (born 1964), Japanese politician (Liberal Democratic Party)
