= Walnut Grove Japanese-American Historic District =

- U.S. National Register of Historic Places
- U.S. Historic district
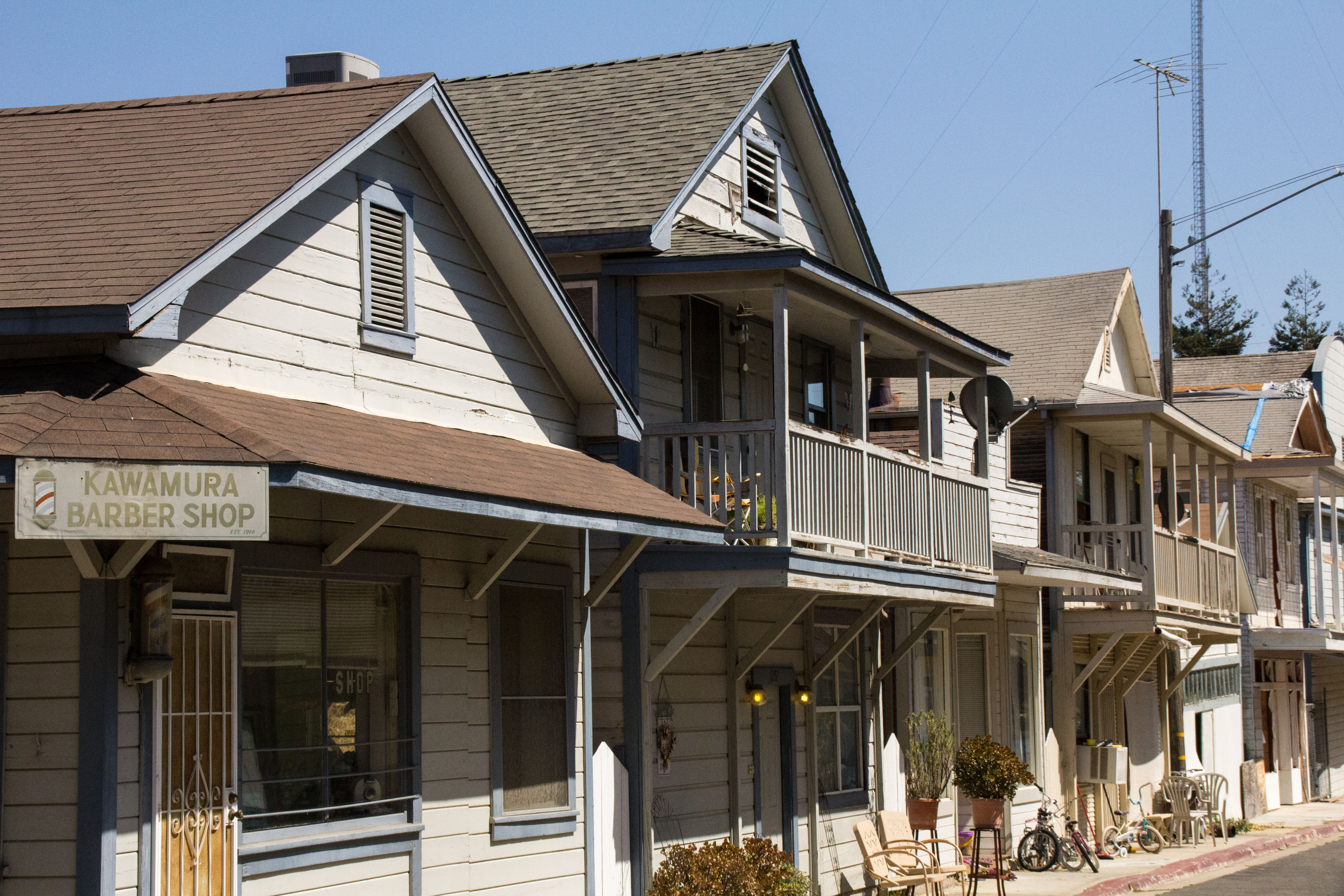
- Kawamura Barber Shop on B Street in the Japanese-American Historic District

- Location within California
- Location: Approximately bounded by Winnie St, Tyler St, C St and River Rd.
- Nearest city: Walnut Grove
- Coordinates: 38.243202°N 121.512085°W
- Area: 5 acres (2.0 ha)
- Built: c.1916
- Architectural style: Craftsman
- NRHP reference No.: 90000483
- Added to NRHP: March 22, 1990

The Walnut Grove Japanese-American Historic District is a 5-acre (2.0 ha) designated U.S. Historic District in Walnut Grove, California. The bulk of Walnut Grove's Japantown was built in 1915–16 following the 1915 fire which destroyed Walnut Grove's Chinatown. Japantown was depopulated during the forced incarceration of Japanese and Japanese-Americans following the issuance of Executive Order 9066 in 1942, and was re-filled by Filipino and Mexican laborers, who took over work in local orchards and farms during the war. Although the original residents returned to Walnut Grove following the end of World War II, most left within a few years, and the district, with some exceptions, to this day retains the original architecture and style dating back to the 1916 reconstruction.

== History ==
Following the passage of the Chinese Exclusion Act in 1882, the pace of immigration from Japan increased rapidly. In Walnut Grove, the first Japanese-owned business (a noodle shop) was started in 1896 to serve local immigrants. The local Japanese immigrants called the area around Walnut Grove Kawashimo ("downriver"), in reference to travel through the Sacramento Delta area. The earliest Japantown in Walnut Grove was established in the northern section of the existing Walnut Grove Chinatown. On October 7, 1915, fire swept through the Chinatown district in Walnut Grove, including Japantown, and shifting winds were credited with confining the damage to the Dye Brothers-owned "Oriental quarter" and not destroying the remainder of the town.

Local residents of Japanese ancestry rebuilt Kawashimo one block north in 1916, on land owned by Alex Brown, a prominent local landowner and banker. Unlike other local nihonmachi, Asians were credited with designing and building the new Kawashimo, with some coming from as far away as San Francisco to participate in the rebuilding. Many of the new buildings were two-story structures, with residences on the upper floor for families operating businesses out of the ground floor. During the 1920s, Kawashimo developed into a local hub for Japanese residents in the Sacramento River Delta area, with its commercial district serving over 100 local families by the 1930s.

Nearly 400 American-born children lived in the area by 1920, with some attending a local Japanese language school; California allowed the establishment of segregated schools in 1921, legitimizing the development of "Oriental Schools" in Florin, Courtland, Isleton, and Walnut Grove. Schools were not officially desegregated until 1947.

The district was forcibly depopulated in the wake of Executive Order 9066 and repopulated with Filipino and Mexican laborers during World War II. Three buildings were destroyed by fire during the war and not replaced, and some of those sites later hosted community gardens. After the end of the war, many of the original residents returned but most did not remain in Walnut Grove, attracted by opportunities in nearby cities. Several businesses remained under the ownership and operation of their founding families as of 1990, including Kawamura Barber Shop and Hayashi Market. The historic district remains architecturally accurate to period photographs dating from the 1920s.

== See also ==
- Internment of Japanese Americans - the illegal incarceration of the Japanese American community that helped precipitate the district's decline.
- Locke, California - which grew from a Chinese community established in the wake of the 1915 Walnut Grove Chinatown fire.
- Sacramento–San Joaquin River Delta - the fertile river delta provided the jobs which attracted many of Japanese and Chinese immigrants to the area.
- Walnut Grove Buddhist Church - historic Buddhist temple founded in 1926 to serve the spiritual needs of the community.
