= Walnut Grove Township, Illinois =

Walnut Grove Township, Illinois may refer to one of the following townships:

- Walnut Grove Township, Knox County, Illinois
- Walnut Grove Township, McDonough County, Illinois

See also

- Walnut Grove Township (disambiguation)
