= Walnut Grove, Arkansas =

Walnut Grove, Arkansas may refer to:

- Walnut Grove, Clay County, Arkansas, a place in Arkansas
- Walnut Grove, Columbia County, Arkansas, a place in Arkansas
- Walnut Grove, Independence County, Arkansas, a place in Arkansas
- Walnut Grove, Little River County, Arkansas, a place in Arkansas
- Walnut Grove, Poinsett County, Arkansas, a place in Arkansas
- Walnut Grove, Pope County, Arkansas
- Walnut Grove, Van Buren County, Arkansas, a community in Van Buren County, Arkansas
- Walnut Grove, Washington County, Arkansas
- Walnut Grove, Yell County, Arkansas, a place in Arkansas

== See also ==
- Walnut Grove Corner, Arkansas, a place in Arkansas
- Walnut Grove (disambiguation)
