= Kamajiro Hotta =

Japanese farmer in California known for growing asparagus

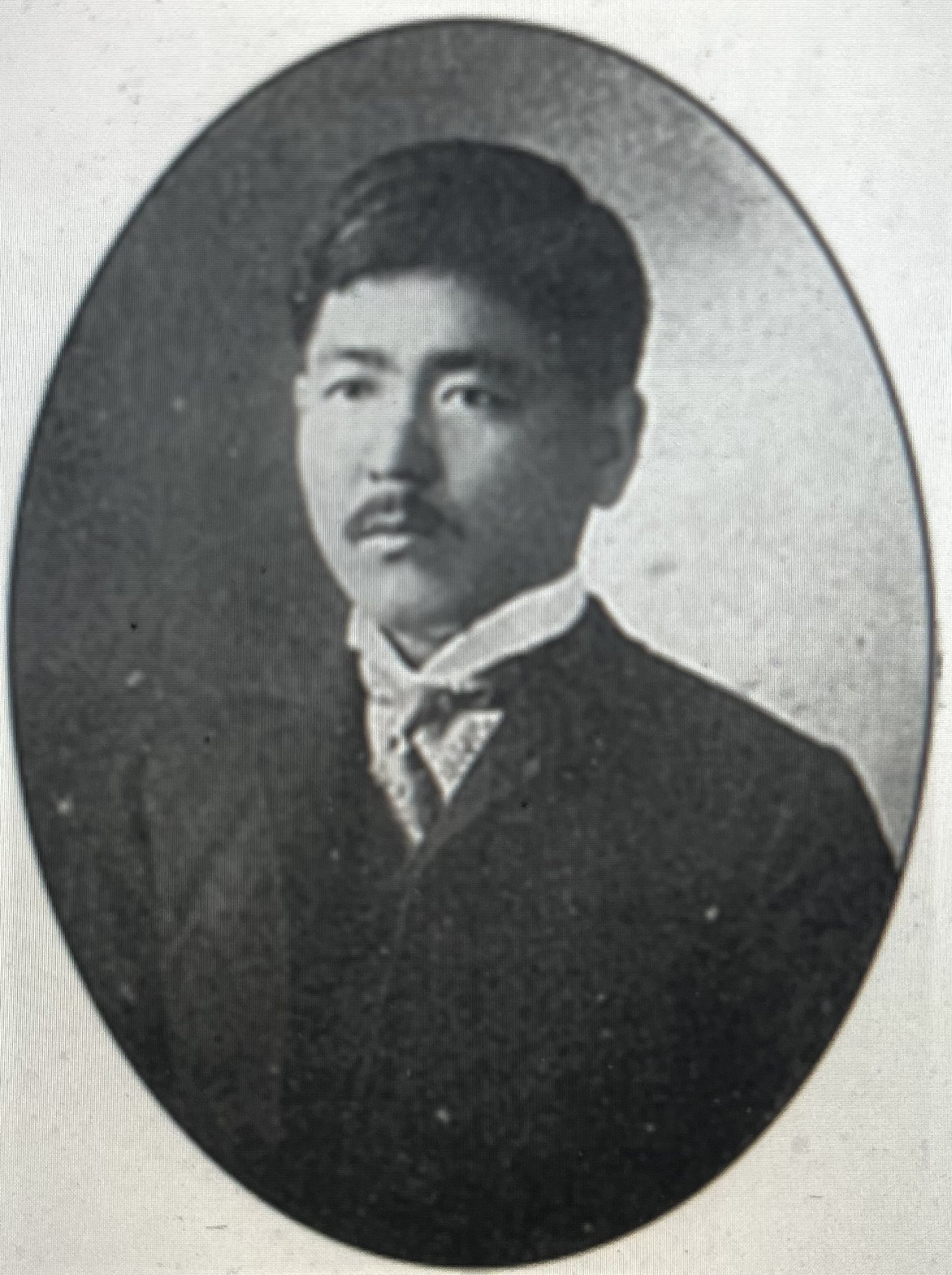
- This portrait of Kamajiro Hotta originally appeared in the Japanese American newspaper entitled "Sakuramento Heigen Nihonjin Taisei Ichiran" in 1911.
- Born: October 26, 1876; Saori District of the Aichi Prefecture, Japan
- Occupation: Farmer
- Organization: Japanese Producers Association
- Known for: Asparagus farming
- Title: President of the Japanese Producers Association (1908–1924)
- Spouse: Ichi Hotta
- Parent(s): Keimon and Fuku Hotta
- Relatives: Seiichi Hotta (Brother) Kakuzaburo Wakayama (Cousin)

Kamajiro Hotta (堀田 鎌次郎, Hotta Kamajiro, born October 26, 1876) was an influential Japanese immigrant farmer in the state of California during the early 20th century. His primary contributions to the California farming industry were in Walnut Grove. While he grew many different crops during his time in the United States, he is most commonly known for growing asparagus. Following his first major land acquisitions in 1904, Hotta's farming career boomed because of his unique land contracts that gave him more autonomy over business operations than other Japanese immigrant farmers at the time.

Due to Hotta's unprecedented financial success growing and selling asparagus, many Japanese immigrant farmers in the area attempted to follow in his footsteps. As a result of his local clout in the Japanese farming community, he was elected as president of the Japanese Producers Association, an interest group dedicated to securing fair land and cannery contracts for Japanese immigrant farmers. Following the passage of anti-Japanese legislation in California such as the Alien Land Law of 1913, the amendment to the Alien Land Law in 1920, and the 1923 United States Supreme Court case ruling against cropping contracts, Hotta stepped down as president of the Japanese Producers Association and returned to his hometown in Japan where he lived out the remainder of his life.

== Early life ==
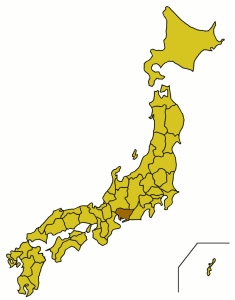
The highlighted region on the map represents the Aichi Prefecture in Japan where Kamajiro Hotta was born.

Kamajiro Hotta was born on October 26, 1876, in Saori, Aichi Prefecture, Japan. Hotta was raised by his father, Keimon, and his mother, Fuku, in Saori. Before emigrating, Hotta moved to Machikata-town in Asai City, Aichi Prefecture.

Immigration documents mark Hotta as literate in Japanese. This implies that he received some sort of education in Japan; however, the extent of his education is unknown.

Hotta had at least one brother, Seiichi, who traveled with him to the Angel Island Immigration Station in San Francisco in 1912. Hotta's immigration was heavily influenced by his cousin, Kakuzaburo Wakayama. Wakayama was one of the main pioneers for immigration from Saori village to the United States.

== Immigration to the United States ==
Following the establishment of the Treaty of Kanagawa, or Japan–US Treaty of Peace and Amity, the previously isolated Japanese nation opened its ports to trade with the United States. Consequently, direct shipping routes between San Francisco and Tokyo were established in 1855. This opened the path for passenger ships to set sail shortly after.

Japanese immigration to the United States was primarily triggered by economic stagnation, high unemployment rates, and poor living conditions because of the rapidly increasing population in Japan. From 1872 to 1903, Japan's population density increased from 1,335 to 1,885 persons per square kilometer, resulting in economic hardship for the Japanese lower class. Many Japanese individuals believed that immigrating to the United States would help them to achieve a better life. Japanese farmers especially felt this way due to the fact that the Japanese archipelago had limited land area for agricultural production despite fifty percent of the population being farmers. The rapidly increasing population density during this time resulted in fierce competition amongst farmers for land.

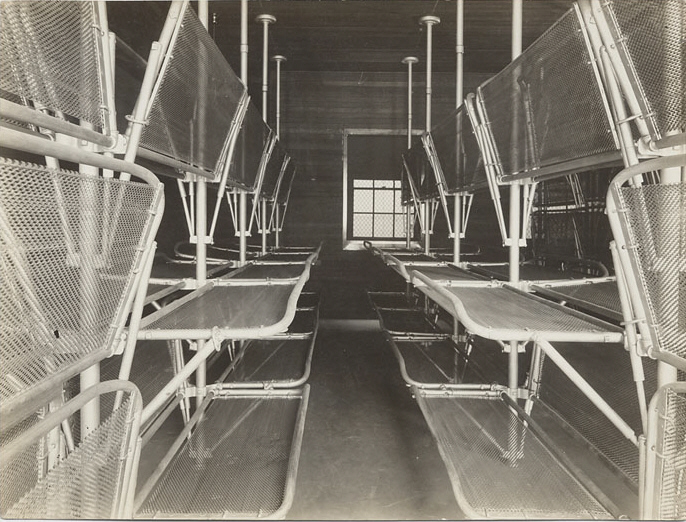
This photo shows the dormitory that immigrants like Kamajiro Hotta slept in while staying at the San Francisco-based customs station Angel Island. Angel Island was in operation from 1910 to 1940. While Hotta did not stop at Angel Island on his first trip over to the United States in 1893, he did pass through on subsequent trips.

Additionally, many working-class Japanese, convinced of the United States' promise of work and social mobility, were motivated to immigrate to the United States. This led many of the Japanese immigrants to come specifically to the United States. Further, the Japanese were not barred from immigration and agriculture like the Chinese were following legislation like the Chinese Exclusion Act of 1882. These reasons caused a huge population increase of Japanese immigrants in the United States in the late 19th and early 20th centuries, with over 127,000 individuals entering between 1901 and 1908.

At the age of 16 years and 11 months, Kamajiro Hotta first arrived in San Francisco on September 23, 1893, on the ship named City of Rio de Janeiro. Hotta had come to San Francisco as an uncontracted merchant. At the time of his arrival, Hotta had no relatives in the United States to stay with.

Hotta returned to Japan in 1897 to lead 109 people from Japan (35 of them from Aichi Prefecture) to California to become farm laborers. Hotta and his peers, including Masayoshi Ota, were leading proponents in increasing the number of Japanese immigrants in Concord County and Walnut Grove.

In 1922, Hotta went to Japan and returned to the United States with his wife, Ichi Hotta. Previous immigration records indicate that the couple had likely been apart from one another since at least 1912. Ichi, born in Nakayasu Village, Hyogo Prefecture, Japan, was 29 years old when she left Aichi Prefecture to live with her husband in Walnut Grove. Ichi lived with her mother-in-law while in Japan. Immigration records reveal that she had $50 in her possession upon arrival, was literate in Japanese, listed her occupation as “wife,” and was born in Nakayasu Village, Hyogo Prefecture, Japan. This was the last time that Hotta entered the United States.

== Early career ==
Following his first immigration to the United States at age 17, Kamajiro Hotta quickly obtained work at a local nursery in Acampo, California to cover his newfound living expenses as an independent. For the next two years, he remained at this site of employment in an honest effort to get financially grounded as a new immigrant. Despite his honest, best efforts, he saw no improvement in his financial situation at this time in his life. In 1895, Hotta quit his job at the nursery in Acampo and ventured into the neighboring town of Walnut Grove to seek out new work opportunities.

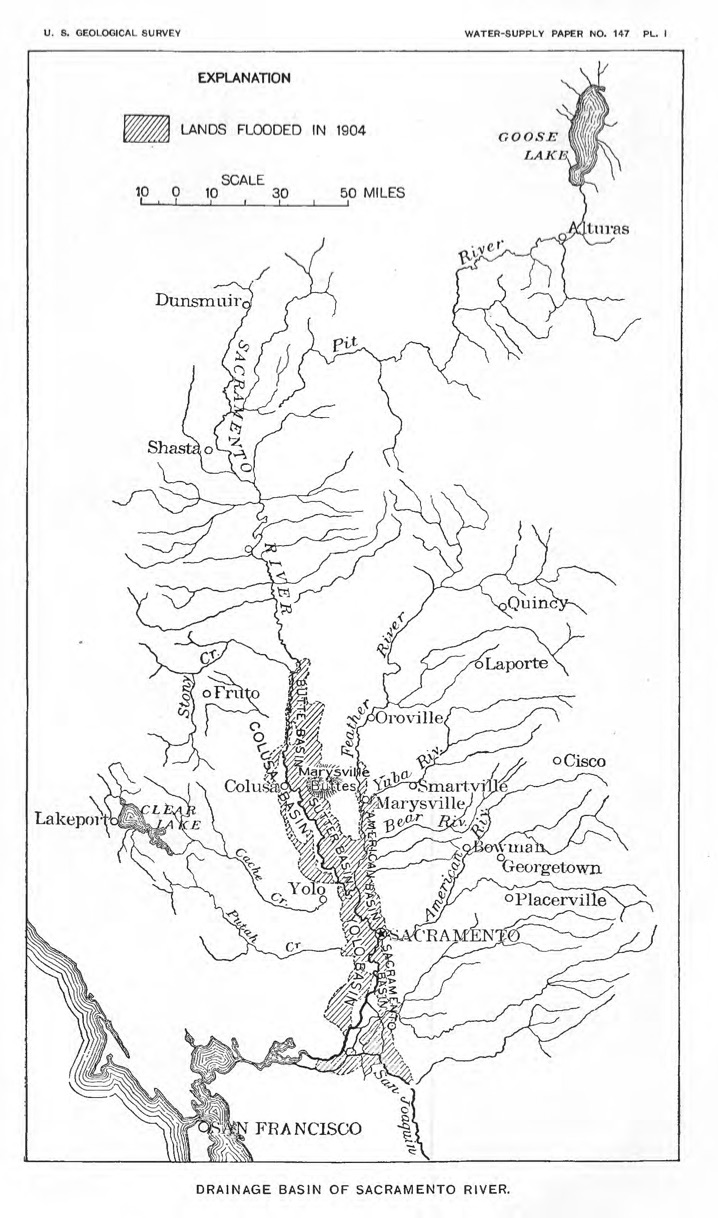
Map detailing the geographical areas affected by the 1904 flood of the Sacramento River.

Shortly after his arrival in the new community, he was hired as a farm laborer in the fields of that area. His primary responsibilities were picking crops and taking care of the land for rich, white landowners. After working in the fields for several months, Hotta realized that obtaining a piece of land and farming it was his path out of abject poverty. Although he believed that farming would be a highly lucrative career and that he had the work ethic to pull it off, he initially lacked the necessary up front capital to lease his own plot of land. From 1895 to 1904, Hotta worked tirelessly at a number of different jobs trying to save up enough money to finance his farming ambitions. During this period of time, it is known that he worked as a general farm laborer, a labor contractor, an operator of a boardinghouse in Sacramento, and a Japanese noodle shop owner.

In 1904, Hotta finally had enough financial capital saved up to abandon his multiple places of employment and begin his full time career as a landowning farmer. At this time, he and three other Aichi-born Japanese immigrants pooled their money together and purchased three farms as cash tenants in the area surrounding Walnut Grove. These farms included 230 acres of land on Victoria Island, 100 acres of land on Bradford Island, and 250 acres of land on Tyler Island. This was a monumental milestone in Hotta's journey to a new kind of life in the United States and position of influence within the farming community of California in the early 20th century.

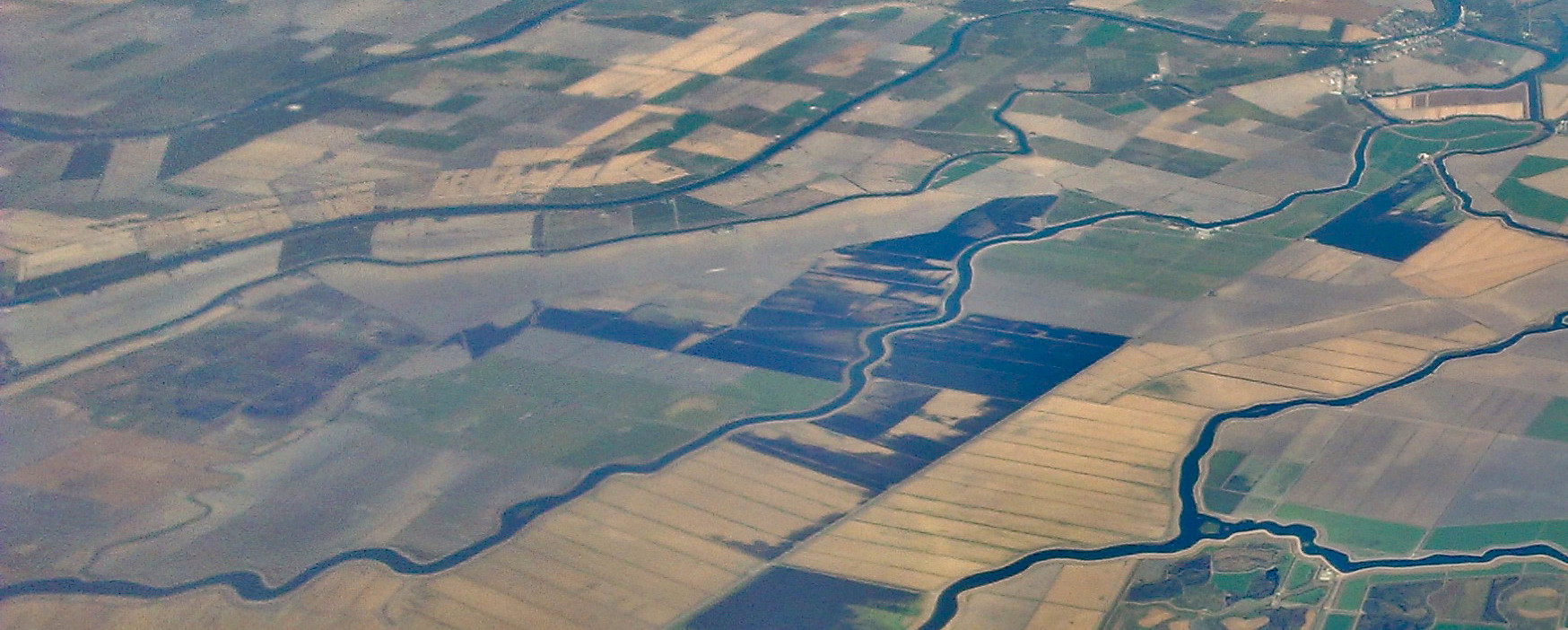
This photo shows an aerial view of Tyler Island taken in the early 21st century. This piece of land was the saving grace for Kamajiro Hotta's financial situation during the 1904 Sacramento River flood.

A few short weeks after his joint purchases of the Victoria Island, Bradford Island, and Tyler Island farms in 1904, Hotta's dreams of leaving American poverty in the past were forcefully shaken by a destructive flood. From February 15 to March 31, 1904, the most devastating flood up until this point in Sacramento history wreaked havoc on the land. Within a few short weeks, the damages were being felt by property owners all along the Sacramento River and related distributary rivers. One area in particular that was greatly affected by the flood was the area surrounding Walnut Grove known as the San Joaquin River Delta because of its susceptibility to stagnating water. As a result of the 1904 flood, Hotta's Victoria Island and Bradford Island farms were utterly ruined. It would be years before the land would be adequate for farming again. Despite his tragic losses from the 1904 flood on the Victoria Island and Bradford Island farms, Hotta was able to keep the Tyler Island farm running during this time and make ends meet.

== Late career and farming in Walnut Grove ==
Although the Sacramento River flood of 1904 was a major setback for the beginning of Kamajiro Hotta's farming career, his monumental leasing agreements of 1904 opened up a host of career opportunities for him that had not been previously afforded to Japanese immigrant tenant farmers. Unlike the vast majority of leasing agreements of the time period, Hotta's legally binding contract did not include any clauses restricting how to operate his farms. For example, his contract on the Tyler Island farm was only limited to paying an annual rent of $2,250 for the 250 acres of land over a period of five years. As a result of his nearly complete autonomy over farming operations, Hotta was free to grow any crop that interested him on his plots of land. This allowed him to begin planting asparagus, a crop that had not been previously cultivated in the Walnut Grove area extensively.

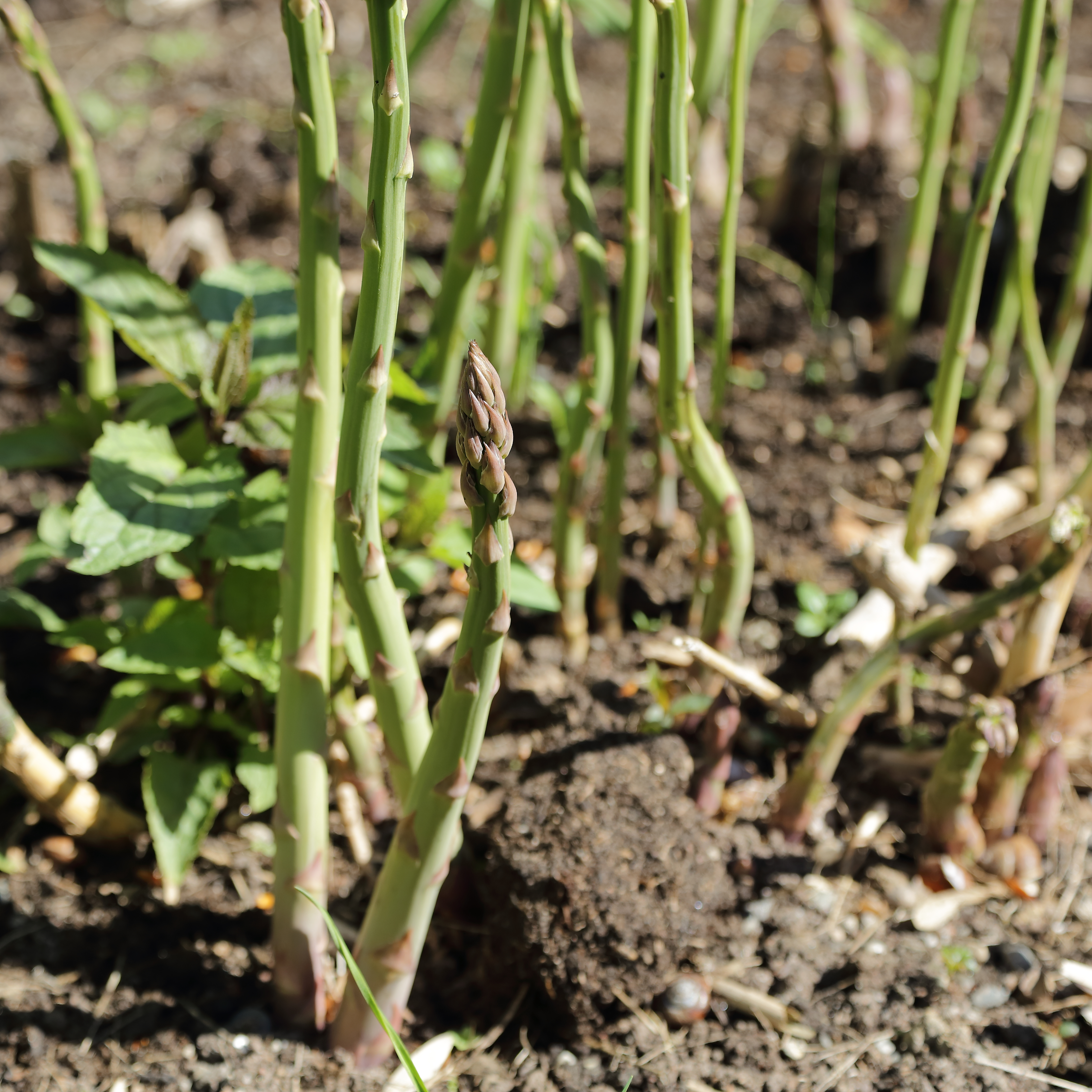
Cultivating asparagus is a risky, long-term financial commitment due to the fact that it takes about three years to produce enough crop for a profitable harvest. Kamajiro Hotta was well aware of this financial risk and still pursued growing asparagus in the early 1900s around the area of Walnut Grove. His farming ambitions regarding asparagus ultimately made him a very successful and wealthy farmer.

In 1905, Hotta planted asparagus for the first time on his newly acquired land. Due to the three-year time commitment that it takes to grow asparagus up to harvesting height, he was without financial returns from this new investment during this time period. As a result, he was forced to plant several acres of quicker growing crops like beans and onions to supplement his income and have enough money to pay his bills. Despite the minimal financial returns that Hotta received from his beans and onions during the years 1905, 1906, and 1907, he was very optimistic about the future because of the 1908 season in which he would be able to harvest and sell asparagus for the first time.

In 1908, Hotta sold his newly grown, first generation asparagus to grocers and farmers markets in the surrounding area for the first time and profited over $2,000 after accounting for all of his yearly expenses. In the subsequent year, 1909, he expanded his asparagus operations, renewed his leasing contracts, and profited over $16,000 on the year from his asparagus harvest. In just a few short years, Hotta went from being impoverished to quite wealthy. Accounting for inflation, Hotta's net income in the year 1909 would be equivalent to nearly half a million United States dollars in 2023.

Hotta's financial success selling asparagus did not end in 1909. In 1910, he successfully brokered a business deal with the California Fruit Canners Association in San Francisco to purchase all of his asparagus cultivated between the years 1910 and 1914. In other words, he had guaranteed cash flow for all of his crops for a whole five years. Under the agreed upon contract, Hotta would receive $3.50 for every 100 pounds of white asparagus brought in and $2.50 for every 100 pounds of green asparagus brought in, irrespective of market price variations. In addition to his favorable business deals with canneries at this time period, Hotta was also able to land a long extension on his leasing contract for his farming lands until 1927. This was a major contributor to his financial success because he did not have to go through the three-year waiting period for first generation asparagus again.

== Asparagus King and president of the Japanese Producers Association ==
Although asparagus farming was not entirely new to the Walnut Grove area when Hotta began his farming operations in 1905, he revolutionized it. As a result of his successes, many Japanese immigrant farmers followed in his footsteps and made the long-term commitment to cultivate asparagus, especially Aichi-born immigrant farmers. Available statistics indicate that in 1904, less than 20% of the total acreage (1,030 acres) under Japanese cultivation in the Walnut Grove area was dedicated to growing asparagus. In 1909, however, that number increased to nearly 50% of the total acreage (5,549 acres). This major increase and crop shift can largely be attributed to Hotta, who the people of Walnut Grove appropriately nicknamed the Asparagus King.

As a result of the rapid growth in asparagus farming in the Walnut Grove area, Japanese immigrant farmers decided that they needed a local organization to help direct the affairs of their newfound industry and coordinate their efforts to maximize crop profits. Fittingly, Hotta was chosen by the body of local asparagus farmers to head the organization and be the community's spokesperson. In 1908, Hotta was officially elected as president of the Japanese Producers Association. During his presidency, he fought relentlessly to land fair asparagus contracts with canneries for local farmers and weaken the overbearing hand of rich, white landowners. Furthermore, he fought tirelessly against the many restrictive laws that were passed trying to limit the rights and financial successes of Japanese immigrant farmers.

As president of the Japanese Producers Association, Kamajiro Hotta frequently used local and state newspapers like the San Francisco Chronicle to help citizens understand and sympathize with the challenges faced by Japanese immigrant farmers.

One well documented example of Hotta's impact as the president of the Japanese Producers Association is that he publicly called out corrupt white landowners that would not recognize how Japanese immigrant farmers had improved the value of their land. He did this in a 1917 interview with a reporter from the San Francisco Chronicle. His intent in making this very open accusation was to rally support for the struggles faced by Japanese immigrant farmers. A second well documented example of Hotta's impact as president of the Japanese Producers Association is that he subleased his land to other Japanese immigrant farmers so that they could avoid making contracts with rich, white landowners. In 1917 alone, Hotta subleased over 1,000 acres of land on Ryer Island under a cash-rent agreement to other Japanese immigrant farmers. A third and final well documented example of his influence as the president of the Japanese Producers Association is that he negotiated a very influential business deal with the manager of the California Packing Corporation in San Francisco in January 1919 which ultimately gave Japanese immigrant farmers a 75-cent wage boost for every 100 pounds of asparagus sold.

== Impact of California Alien Land Laws ==
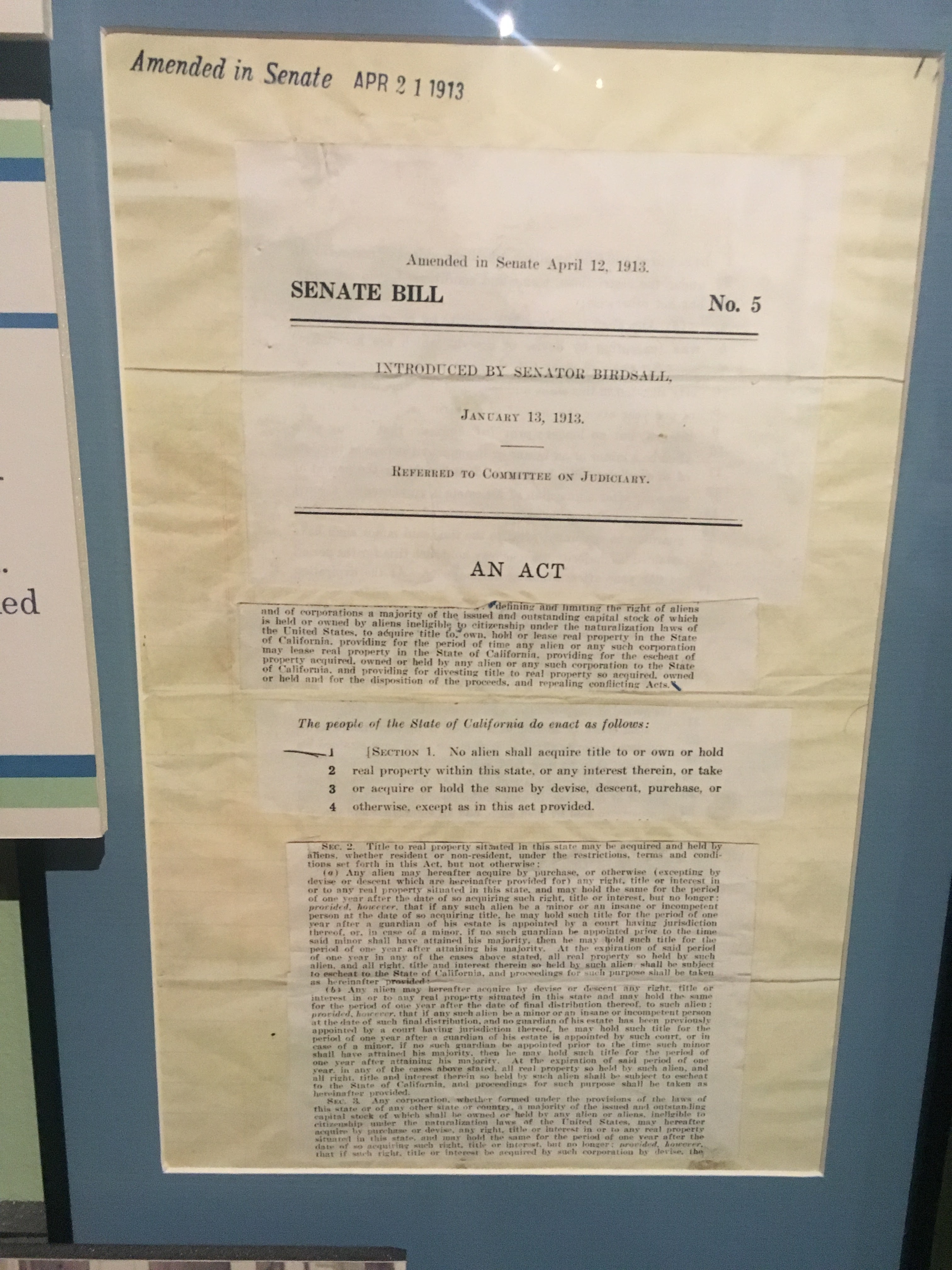
This is one of the original printed documents detailing the restrictions of the 1913 California Alien Land Law. This piece of legislation prohibited foreigners to the United States, like Kamajiro Hotta, from owning land in the state of California.

Despite Kamajiro Hotta's fierce opposition to unfair laws barring Japanese immigrant farmers from personal autonomy and social mobility in the Walnut Grove area, he was ultimately unable to prevent many devastating pieces of legislation from negatively impacting local asparagus farmers. The massive increase of anti-Japanese political and organizational movements in California following Yellow Peril arguments at the time ultimately diminished his influence. Furthermore, returning farmers to the California area that fought during World War I did not help the situation either because they felt that Japanese immigrant farmers were stealing their job opportunities.

As a result of all the aforementioned sources of political tension between whites and Japanese immigrant farmers during the early 20th century, the California state government passed anti-alien farming legislation like the California Alien Land Law of 1913. The 1913 law prohibited "aliens ineligible for citizenship" from purchasing, but permitted the leasing of land for a term of up to three years. In effect, this prevented first-generation issei Japanese immigrants from owning land individually or collectively, forcing them into a system of land tenure where they had to lease land from wealthy white landowners. In Los Angeles, the 1913 law led to the development of a triracial hierarchy in the agricultural industry with Japanese farmers occupying the middle position between white land owners, whom they leased land from, and Mexican farmworkers hired by Japanese tenant farmers. Despite the passage of this restrictive law, Japanese Americans found a way to circumvent the legislation by using the names of their US-born children for land leases. Furthermore, they found other loopholes in the policy such as being paid in the form of stocks for companies that owned agricultural land. In 1920, these loopholes were made inaccessible when the California state government revised the original 1913 version of the law.

The California Alien Land Law of 1913, and subsequent revised version in 1920, limited the leasing of agricultural land to a maximum of three years for legal aliens in the state of California. This limitation negatively impacted Japanese immigrant farmers especially because it forced them to find new work every three years or return to Japan. Most of the Japanese immigrants in Walnut Grove did not own land, so their primary concerns regarded leasing limitations. As a result of the profitability of Japanese tenant farmers for land leasers, white landowners in the Walnut Grove area initially supported the efforts of Japanese immigrant farmers that protested the aforementioned barring legislation. After the 1913 law, Japanese tenant farmers like Hotta would try to avoid leasing limitations by jointly purchasing contracts with other Japanese partners, thus multiplying the number of years of the three-year lease by the number of people. Additionally, white landowners would often employ farmers in cropping contracts rather than leasing the land. However, the relationship between the white landowners and the Japanese immigrant farmers was riddled with inequalities like low wages. These inequalities were exacerbated following the 1920 and 1923 revisions of the law. The lack of equality and dismal prospects of farm work in the United States prompted many of the Japanese immigrant farmers, including Hotta, to permanently leave the United States and return to Japan. The majority of them left in the summer of 1924.

== Return to Japan and later life ==
After resigning from being president of the local Japanese Producers Association, Kamajiro Hotta left Walnut Grove and returned to Japan in September 1924. Hotta was accompanied by three farmers that he had subleased his 1,000-acre farm to previously. At this time, he felt as though there were no longer prospects for him as a farmer in the United States and that he would be more successful in Japan with the tens of thousands of dollars that he had accrued. Following him, many other Aichi-born immigrants returned to Japan, reflecting the decline of Walnut Grove Japanese agriculture. Details regarding Hotta's life and death following his return to Japan remain unknown.
