= Locke, California =

Unincorporated community in California, United States

- Locke Historic District
- U.S. National Register of Historic Places
- U.S. National Historic Landmark District
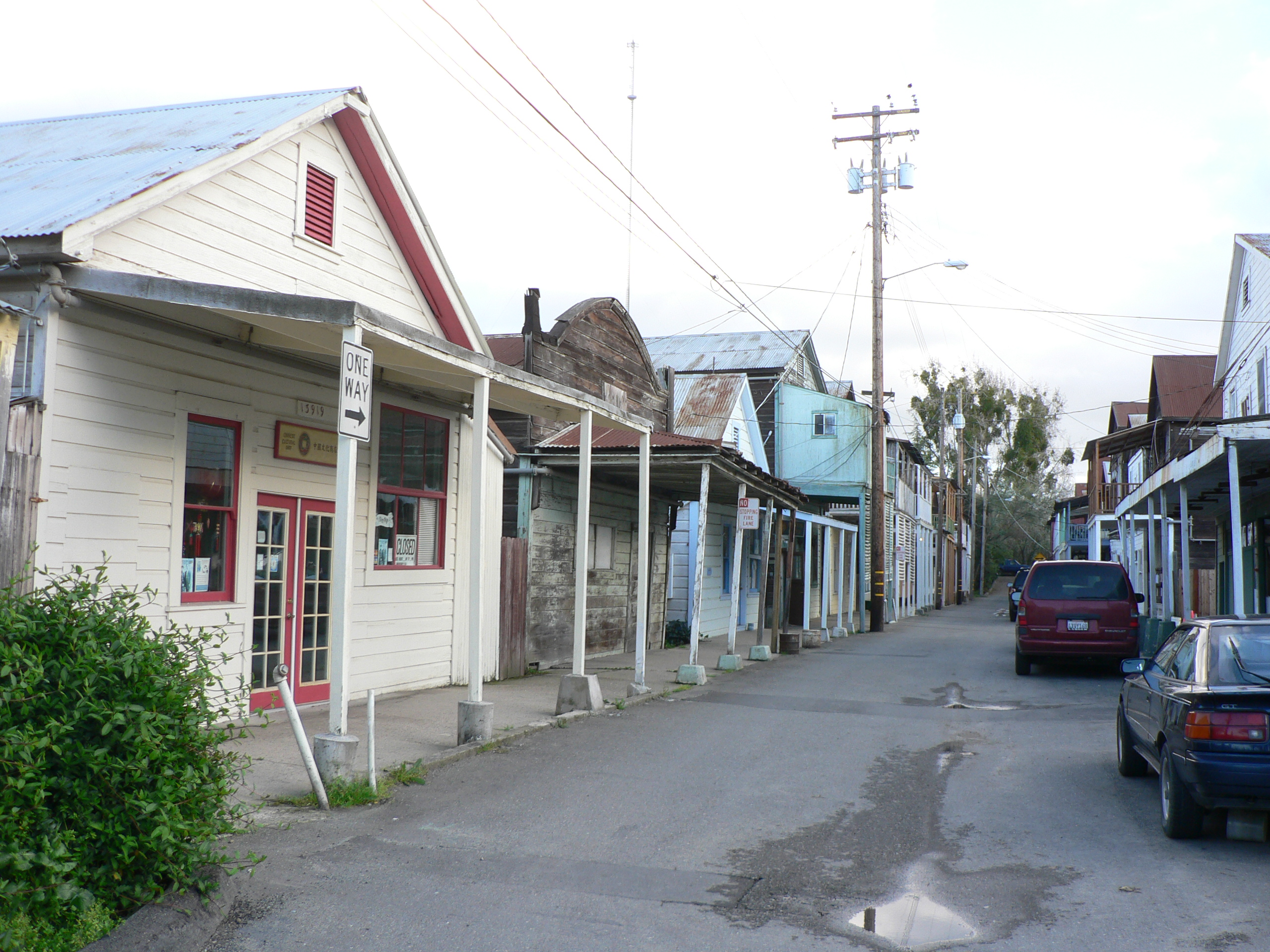
- The main street of Locke, in 2006, has some Chinese museums, vintage and antique shops, a famous bar/restaurant, artist galleries and a Bed & Breakfast.

- Location within California Location within the United States
- Location: Bounded on the W by the Sacramento River, on the N by Locke Rd., on the E by Alley St., and on the S by Levee St., Locke, California
- Coordinates: 38°15′2″N 121°30′34″W
- Area: 14 acres (5.7 ha)
- Built: 1915
- Architectural style: Woodcutter's Gothic vernacular similar to other gold rush towns in the region. Lead Carpenter according to 1986 Historic American Buildings Survey [HABS 1986] was a Missouri native, Cleveland Hill. Five of the approximately 36 remaining buildings have shiplap strake siding, a popular construction material from 1870 to 1910.
- NRHP reference No.: 71000174

Significant dates
- Added to NRHP: May 6, 1971
- Designated NHLD: December 14, 1990

Locke, also known as Locke Historic District, is an unincorporated community in the Sacramento–San Joaquin River Delta of California, United States. The 14-acre town (5.7 ha) was first developed between 1893 and 1915 approximately one mile (1.6 km) north of the town of Walnut Grove in Sacramento County.

Locke (originally Lockeport) is a primarily agricultural community near State Route 160, south of Sacramento. It was listed on the National Register of Historic Places in 1971, designated a National Historic Landmark District in 1990 as a unique example of a historic Chinese American (and several other cultures) within a small rural community. The population as of 2025 was estimated to be about 70, with about 3 Chinese Americans.

The village of Lockeport (shortened to "Locke" in 1920) began where the Sacramento Valley Railway and Union Pacific Railroads merged at the southwest corner of the 490-acre swampland parcel (200 ha) deeded on July 6, 1883, to founder, George W. Locke, and his mercantile business partner, Samuel P. Lavenson. Both men were lured in their youth by the California Gold Rush.

After a fire destroyed the Chinatown and Japantown areas of nearby Walnut Grove on October 7, 1915, many immigrants from the town resettled in and further developed Locke. Chinese and Japanese-owned businesses were established, along with a Chinese language school. The town continued to thrive as a Chinese American agricultural community until after World War II, when younger residents begin leaving the town for better educational and employment opportunities in urban centers and Hispanic immigrants replaced the agricultural field workforce.

== History ==
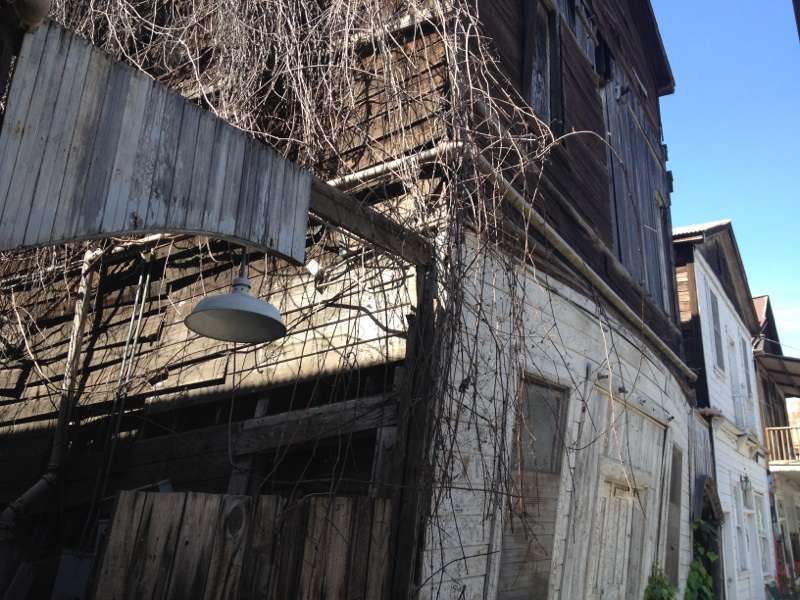
Building sagging with age

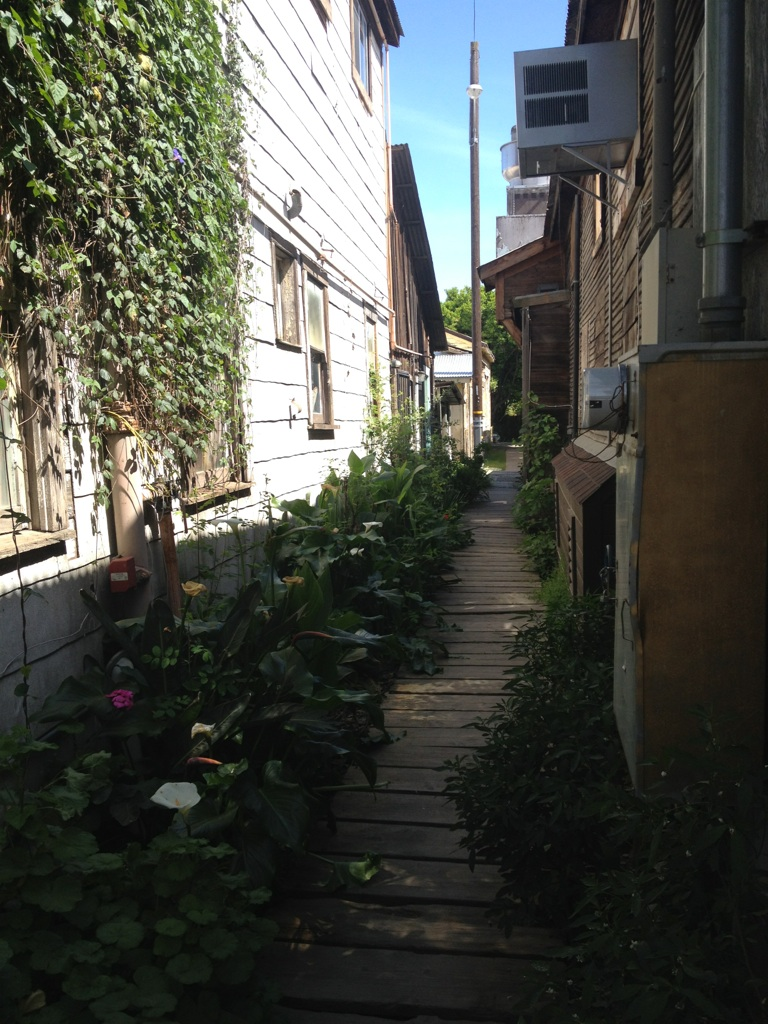
Boardwalk with plenty of greenery between buildings

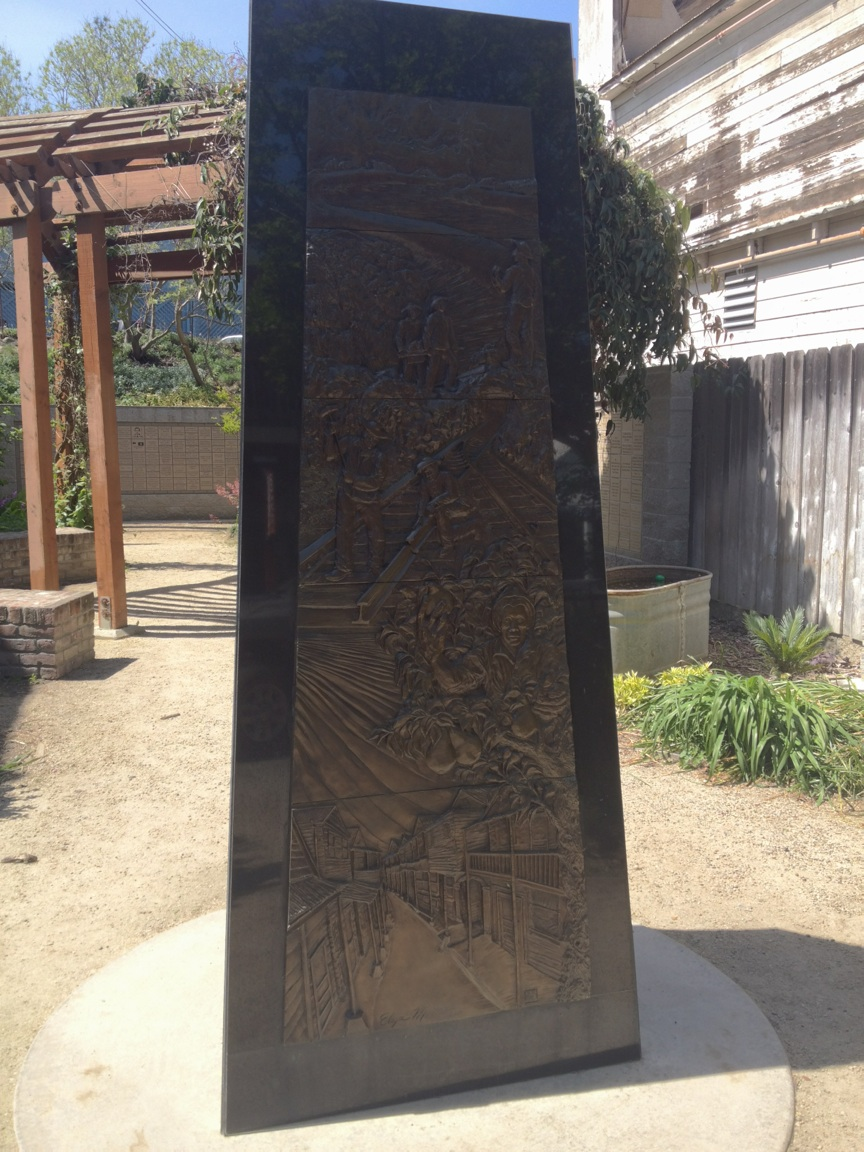
Memorial in Locke to Chinese immigrants and laborers

The delta swampland which Locke was built on was home to Native American Miwok and Maidu tribes for hundreds of years. Tribal burial grounds exist on the Locke parcel.

Legislation such as the Swampland Reclamation Act of 1861 was enacted in California to put perceived empty and wasted lands to use and stabilization. Much of this involved draining the Delta wetlands and building levees to regulate flood control in places like Locke. Mainly poor Chinese immigrants were hired to do this backbreaking reclamation work. Contracted labor was often paid the equivalent of less than one dollar a day per worker. They built hundreds of miles of levees in waist deep water where malaria still rampaged, reclaiming a total 88,000 acres (36,000 ha).

In 1912, three Chinese merchants, two from the nearby town of Vorden and one from Walnut Grove, contracted tradesmen to construct three buildings. Chan Tin Sin built the first building. It was a combination dry goods store and beer saloon. Yuen Lai Sing built a gambling hall. Owyang Wing Cheong built the Lockeport Hotel & Restaurant.

Following that early construction the Canton Hotel was built, along with several other buildings. A total of seven structures eventually formed the hamlet of Lockeport. Though some merchants hoped to provide a destination for riverboat and train passengers, the idea never worked due to the discrimination against Chinese during those times. One of the homes built in the first phase of construction provided shelter for Chan Tin Sin's cousin Chan Chor Get and his family from the discriminatory acts and violence in San Francisco Chinatown.

On October 7, 1915, the Chinatown of nearby Walnut Grove was destroyed by an accidental fire. Afterwards, the Main Street section of Locke was established and settled by a group of Chinese immigrants from what is now modern day Zhongshan in southern China's Guangdong province, headed by Lee Bing, a Chinese American businessman. Whereas Taishanese-speaking Chinese settlers remained in Walnut Grove after the fire to rebuild, the Cantonese-speaking Zhongshan Chinese settlers migrated to Locke to create a town of their own. The land was leased from George Locke as California law at the time forbade the selling of farmland to Asian immigrants by the California Alien Land Law of 1913.

Due to its relatively large Chinese population at the time, the Chinese Kuomintang political party once had a local chapter in Locke. As the town grew, so did its reputation as a destination for illicit entertainment, gaining the nickname "California's Monte Carlo". At one point, it had five gambling halls, five brothels, speakeasies and opium dens.

The population of Locke swelled with the growing season and harvest. Most of the reclaimed land in the Sacramento-San Joaquin Delta including Locke was used for cash crops, including asparagus, potato, sweet potatoes, white beans, pears, and apples. There would be as many as 1,000 to 1,500 Chinese people living in Locke. Farmhands shared rooms in the boarding houses. Chinese residents living in the homes behind Main Street also took in Chinese farm laborers. Chinese immigrants in Locke started patterns in California agriculture that are continued today in the Sacramento-San Joaquin region, including contracted labor, tenant farming, sharecropping, and the piece wage system. A community garden existed in the back and there was a special oven to make roast pigs on Sundays. Chinese communities congregated in solidarity under difficult labor and social conditions fostered by legislation such as the Chinese Exclusion Act, creating community gardens that maintained cultural relevancy in the form of growing Chinese cabbage, snow peas, leafy vegetables, winter melon, and tomatoes. Baptist missionary Dr. Charles Shepherd would bring in his Chungmei home boys for the pear harvest at the end of July. Life in Locke had a great deal of accord. The Chinese mothers took care of each other's children when another mother had to go to work at the cannery across the River Road next to the riverboat docks of the Sacramento River.

During the 1940s and 1950s, many of Locke's Chinese Americans, many of whom received better education, began joining the American mainstream by moving out of rural Locke and into the burgeoning suburbs of the major cities.

The Locke Historic District is bounded on the west by the Sacramento River, on the north by Locke Rd., on the east by Alley St., and on the south by Levee St. The district was added to the National Register of Historic Places on May 6, 1971.

A Hong Kong-based developer purchased the town in 1977 from the Locke Heirs and sold it in 2002 to the Sacramento Housing and Redevelopment Agency. In 2004, the agency finally allowed the sale of land to those who had been living on it for many years. There were plans to convert Locke into a housing development and tourist attraction. At the north end of Main Street, the restored Locke Boarding House museum (now owned by California State Parks) operates daily, staffed by volunteers. The Town of Locke celebrated its centennial anniversary in 2015, with a large gathering on May 9.

On July 3, 2016, a fire erupted on the second floor of the Locke Country Store on Main Street, which contained two apartments. The fire resulted in the complete destruction of the second floor of the building and a building behind the store. There were no injuries.

The Locke Historic District was designated a National Historic Landmark on December 14, 1990.

== Politics ==
In the state legislature, Locke is in the 3rd senatorial district, represented by Democrat Christopher Cabaldon, and in the 9th Assembly district, represented by Republican Heath Flora.

Federally, Locke is in California's 7th congressional district, represented by Democrat Doris Matsui.

== Post office ==
Locke had its own ZIP Code of 95649, but it was discontinued shortly after the post office bearing that code closed on August 2, 1963. Since then, Locke uses Walnut Grove's ZIP code of 95690, and the community is inside area code 916.

== In popular culture ==
Locke is the subject of the following books:

- Bitter Melon: Inside America's Last Rural Chinese Town by Jeff Gillenkirk and James Motlow (Nine Mile Press). Winner of the Commonwealth Club's 57th Annual Book Award, Silver Medal
- One Day, One Dollar: Locke, California, and the Chinese Farming Experience in the Sacramento Delta by Peter C. Y Leung.
- Water Ghosts (a novel) by Shawna Yang Ryan.

Locke has been featured in the following film and television series:

- Bird (1988) – Locke doubled for Kansas City in Clint Eastwood's film about Charlie Parker.
- California's Gold (1991) Season 1 Episode 7 "Preserving the Past"
- Life (1999) – Locke doubled for the Mississippi Delta in the Eddie Murphy and Martin Lawrence buddy comedy.
- Take Out with Lisa Ling S1 E2 (2022) – Lisa Ling visited the town in this series about Asian American cuisine.
