= Walnut Grove, Pope County, Arkansas =

Walnut Grove, Arkansas
- Unincorporated community
- Walnut Grove's position in Arkansas Walnut Grove, Arkansas (the United States)
- Coordinates: 35°28′29″N 92°56′21″W
- Country: United States
- State: Arkansas
- County: Pope
- Township: Jackson
- Elevation: 702 ft (214 m)
- Time zone: UTC-6 (Central (CST))
  - Summer (DST): UTC-5 (CDT)
- ZIP code: 72843
- Area code: 479
- GNIS feature ID: 62057

Walnut Grove was an unincorporated community in Jackson Township, Pope County, Arkansas, United States. It was located on Walnut Grove Road, east of Hector. The Walnut Grove cemetery and church are approximately one mile apart at the location indicated with the cemetery adjacent to Dare Creek and the church on a hilltop one mile to the south.
