= Walnut Grove, California =

Walnut Grove
- Census-designated place
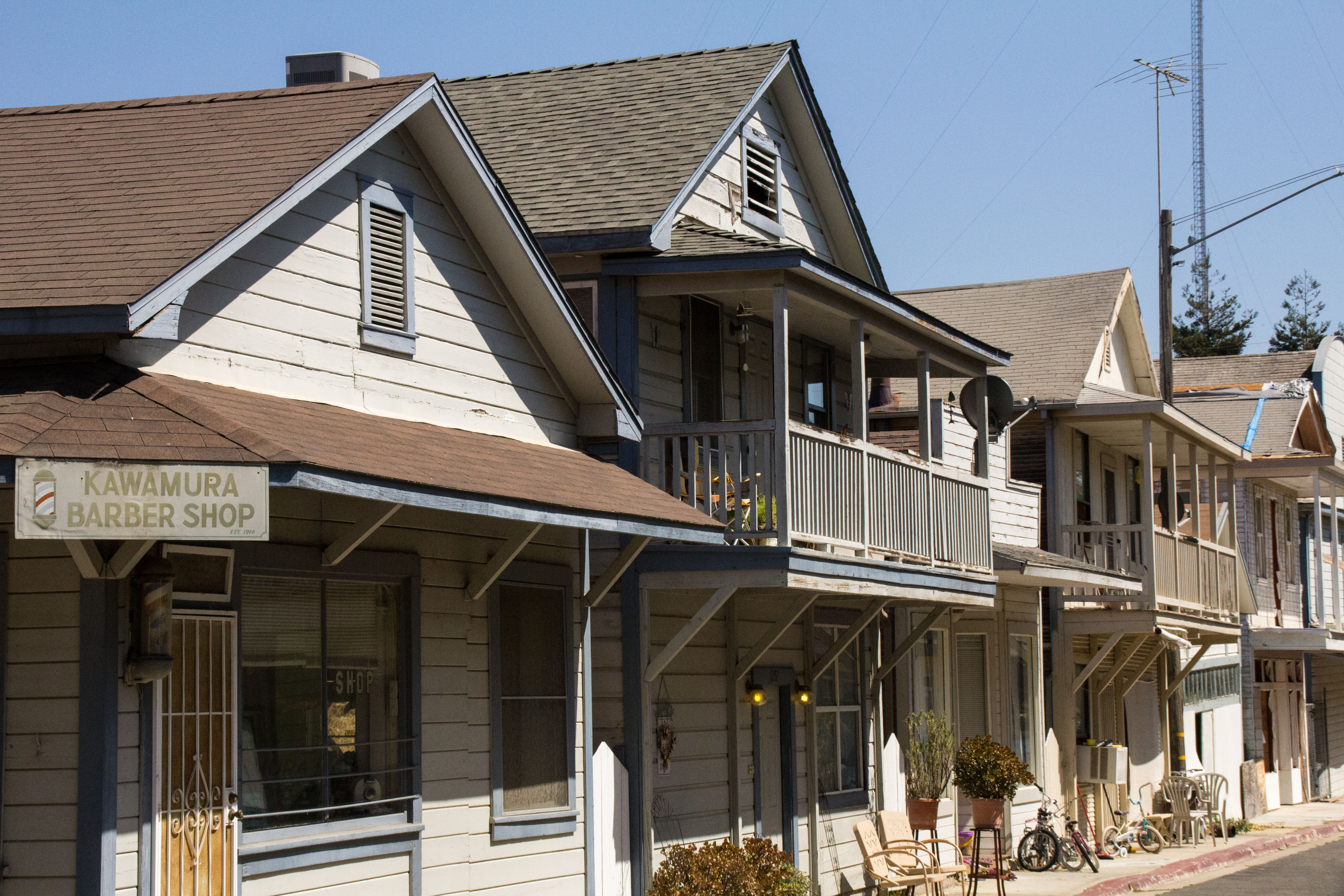
- Walnut Grove Japanese-American Historic Commercial District

- Location in Sacramento County and the state of California

- Location within Sacramento-San Joaquin River Delta Location within the United States
- Coordinates: 38°14′37″N 121°30′44″W
- Country: United States
- State: California
- County: Sacramento

Area
  - Total: 10.928 sq mi (28.30 km^{2})
  - Land: 10.201 sq mi (26.42 km^{2})
  - Water: 0.727 sq mi (1.88 km^{2}) 6.65%
- Elevation: 10 ft (3.0 m)

Population (2020)
  - Total: 1,452
  - Density: 142.3/sq mi (54.96/km^{2})
- Time zone: UTC-8 (PST)
  - Summer (DST): UTC-7 (PDT)
- ZIP code: 95690
- Area code: 916, 279
- FIPS code: 06-83374
- GNIS feature ID: 1660121

Walnut Grove is a census-designated place (CDP) in Sacramento County, California, United States. Founded in 1851 by Japanese immigrants, it served as an important port between Sacramento and San Francisco. It is part of the Sacramento–Arden-Arcade–Roseville Statistical Area. The population was 1,452 at the 2020 census, down from 1,542 at the 2010 census.

As one of the only remaining Japanese-American built cities in the United States, Walnut Grove is considered a historical district and National Historic Landmark. About 40 of the original buildings still stand.

Later, Japanese immigrants settled here to work on asparagus farms. The first known Japanese owned business was a noodle shop, which opened in 1896.

== Geography ==
Walnut Grove is located at 38°14′37″N 121°30′44″W (38.243490, −121.512100).

According to the United States Census Bureau, the CDP has a total area of 10.9 square miles (28 km^{2}), of which 10.2 square miles (26 km^{2}) is land and 0.7 square miles (1.8 km^{2}) (6.65%) is water.

== Demographics ==
Historical population
Census	Pop.	Note	%±
2000	669		—
2010	1,542		130.5%
2020	1,452		−5.8%
U.S. Decennial Census; 1850–1870 1880-1890; 1900 1910 1920; 1930 1940 1950; 1960 1970 1980; 1990 2000 2010

Walnut Grove first appeared as a census designated place in the 2000 U.S. census.

=== 2020 census ===
As of the 2020 census, Walnut Grove had a population of 1,452, with a population density of 142.3 inhabitants per square mile (54.9/km^{2}). The median age was 43.9 years. For every 100 females, there were 96.5 males, and for every 100 females age 18 and over, there were 91.3 males age 18 and over.

The census reported that 1,447 people (99.7% of the population) lived in households, 5 (0.3%) lived in non-institutionalized group quarters, and no one was institutionalized. There were 549 households, of which 188 (34.2%) had children under the age of 18 living in them. Of all households, 273 (49.7%) were married-couple households, 42 (7.7%) were cohabiting couple households, 125 (22.8%) had a male householder with no spouse or partner present, and 109 (19.9%) had a female householder with no spouse or partner present. 128 households (23.3%) were one person, and 59 (10.7%) were one person aged 65 or older. The average household size was 2.64, and there were 385 families (70.1% of all households).

The age distribution was 310 people (21.3%) under the age of 18, 114 people (7.9%) aged 18 to 24, 323 people (22.2%) aged 25 to 44, 384 people (26.4%) aged 45 to 64, and 321 people (22.1%) who were 65 years of age or older.

There were 623 housing units at an average density of 61.1 units per square mile (23.6 units/km^{2}), of which 549 (88.1%) were occupied and 74 (11.9%) were vacant. Of occupied units, 274 (49.9%) were owner-occupied and 275 (50.1%) were renter-occupied. The homeowner vacancy rate was 2.1% and the rental vacancy rate was 0.0%.

0.0% of residents lived in urban areas, while 100.0% lived in rural areas.

Racial composition as of the 2020 census
Race	Number	Percent
White	670	46.1%
Black or African American	32	2.2%
American Indian and Alaska Native	28	1.9%
Asian	97	6.7%
Native Hawaiian and Other Pacific Islander	1	0.1%
Some other race	422	29.1%
Two or more races	202	13.9%
Hispanic or Latino (of any race)	660	45.5%

=== Income and poverty ===
In 2023, the US Census Bureau estimated that the median household income was $88,269, and the per capita income was $44,065. About 15.5% of families and 13.7% of the population were below the poverty line.

=== 2010 census ===
The 2010 United States census reported that Walnut Grove had a population of 1,542. The population density was 141.2 inhabitants per square mile (54.5/km^{2}). The racial makeup of Walnut Grove was 943 (61.2%) White, 15 (1.0%) African American, 24 (1.6%) Native American, 110 (7.1%) Asian, 0 (0.0%) Pacific Islander, 402 (26.1%) from other races, and 48 (3.1%) from two or more races. Hispanic or Latino of any race were 673 persons (43.6%).

The Census reported that 1,533 people (99.4% of the population) lived in households, 9 (0.6%) lived in non-institutionalized group quarters, and 0 (0%) were institutionalized.

== History ==
=== 1800s ===
Established in 1851 by John W. Sharp, Walnut Grove is one of the earliest Chinese American settlements along the Sacramento River. Many of the original settlers were forced to Walnut Grove, after their previous homes and towns were burnt down. The city was rented to the Chinese by John Wesley Sharp.

After Sharp's death in 1880, his heirs sold Walnut Grove to Alex Brown and his mother Agnes. Brown was a highly successful entrepreneur and a staunch supporter of the Chinese and Japanese communities in Walnut Grove. He provided financial backing to several Asian businessmen and rented land to others at reasonable rates. The Brown family subsequently became heavily involved in the commercial life of the community, operating a general store, hotel, and asparagus packing house, as well as the Bank of Alex Brown.

Exhausted from their previous experiences with arson, the Chinese built simple, large, and inexpensive buildings. Estimated to have cost about $800 each at the time.

The community was made up of residents from two different areas of Guangdong Province in southern China - Heungshan County (modern day Zhongshan) on the east side of the Pearl River and Sze Yup made up of four districts - Xinhui, Taishan, Kaiping and Enping – on the west side of the Pearl River. Besides being from different areas in China the residents also spoke different dialects and could not communicate easily with one another. Walnut Grove's Chinese community was primarily from Heungshan and outnumbered those from Sze Yup by almost ten to one. As was common in Chinese immigrant communities in the U.S., the community in Walnut Grove organized tongs (voluntary associations) formed around shared interests such as a home district in China, family names, and native dialects. The various tongs provided support and protection to newly arriving Chinese immigrants and were in constant competition for influence within Walnut Grove's Chinatown.

During the 1880 and 1890s, Chinese businessmen in Walnut Grove developed a thriving commercial and social center for the hundreds of Chinese, Japanese, and Filipino agricultural laborers who worked throughout the Delta region. Businesses operating in Chinatown included dry goods and grocery stores, restaurants, laundries, shoe stores, fish and meat markets, saloons, gambling halls, boarding houses, herbal shops, temples, and baths. Of particular importance to the Chinese communities throughout the region was Walnut Grove's Bing Kong Tong Society, a branch of the San Francisco Bing Kong Tong Society. The Society established the branch in Walnut Grove before World War I to manage labor relationships, regulate gambling, provide mail and bank services, and help laborers find work. It also sent the bones of the deceased back to China for burial and helped Chinese immigrants return to their native land. At its height, the Bing Kong Tong Society branch in Walnut Grove was the most important social organization in the region's Chinese community with over 400 active members from throughout the Delta.

=== 1900s ===
Early Japanese immigrants described travel through the Sacramento Delta area as going "down river," leading the Issei to call the area around Walnut Grove, "Kawashimo." Chinese immigrants had harnessed the delta's fertility in the 1870-80s by creating a network of levees and inland islands that controlled flooding in what had been a marshy swamp. White landowners reaped the primary benefits from this major project of land "reclamation" and dominated the local economy, along with the multiethnic population of immigrants who arrived in succession from China, Japan, East India, the Philippines and Mexico to work the fields around Walnut Grove.

Unlike other Japanese agricultural settlements, where some immigrants were able to purchase land and establish independent farms, Kawashimo remained wholly owned by a few white landholders. Issei farmers arrived in Walnut Grove after 1892 and established themselves in fruit, tomatoes, beans and asparagus production, first as itinerant contract laborers and then through tenant farming. Walnut Grove emerged as a hub for Japanese in the delta area and by the 1930s, over 100 Nikkei families farmed around Walnut Grove. Kawashimo's Japantown had a bustling commercial area to serve their recreational and material needs, as well as community institutions such as the Buddhist and Methodist Churches, a Japanese language school, Kenjinkai (prefectural associations) and Japanese Association.

In 1915, a catastrophic fire consumed Walnut Grove's Chinatown and a portion of the smaller Japantown. Tensions between these communities led the Japanese immigrants to rebuild on adjacent blocks owned by Alex Brown, a farmer, banker and major landholder who helped amend the Alien Land Laws to maintain his profitable relationship with Japanese immigrants. Brown installed water and sewage lines and constructed seven commercial buildings offered for rent, along with additional parcels on which he encouraged Nikkei to build. Families drew numbers out of a hat to determine on which lot they would build their homes and businesses. Japanese builders and carpenters came from as far as San Francisco to lend their expertise and labor to the task of rebuilding Kawashimo's Japantown. The neighborhood still features the narrow streets lined by two-story wooden structures with overhanging balconies that the Issei created in 1915. Even the underlying property arrangements, in which Nikkei owned the house but not the underlying land, were not changed until the late 1990s.

As a rare example of a Japanese enclave designed and built by immigrants themselves, the commercial core of Walnut Grove's Japantown was designated a National Register historic district in 1990 (as was the neighboring Chinatown). The Preserving California's Japantowns volunteer survey team of Barbara Takei, Janet Sakata and Louie Watanabe made an important contribution to the existing National Register information by documenting the "backtown" area of Walnut Grove's Japantown. Just to the east across the Southern Pacific railroad tracks, "backtown's" larger blocks held many Nikkei residences, as well as a hotel, auto garages and the Buddhist Church and Japanese School building.

In 1961, documentary photographer Pirkle Jones did a photo essay on Walnut Grove.

== Sites of interest ==
=== Walnut Grove Buddhist Church ===
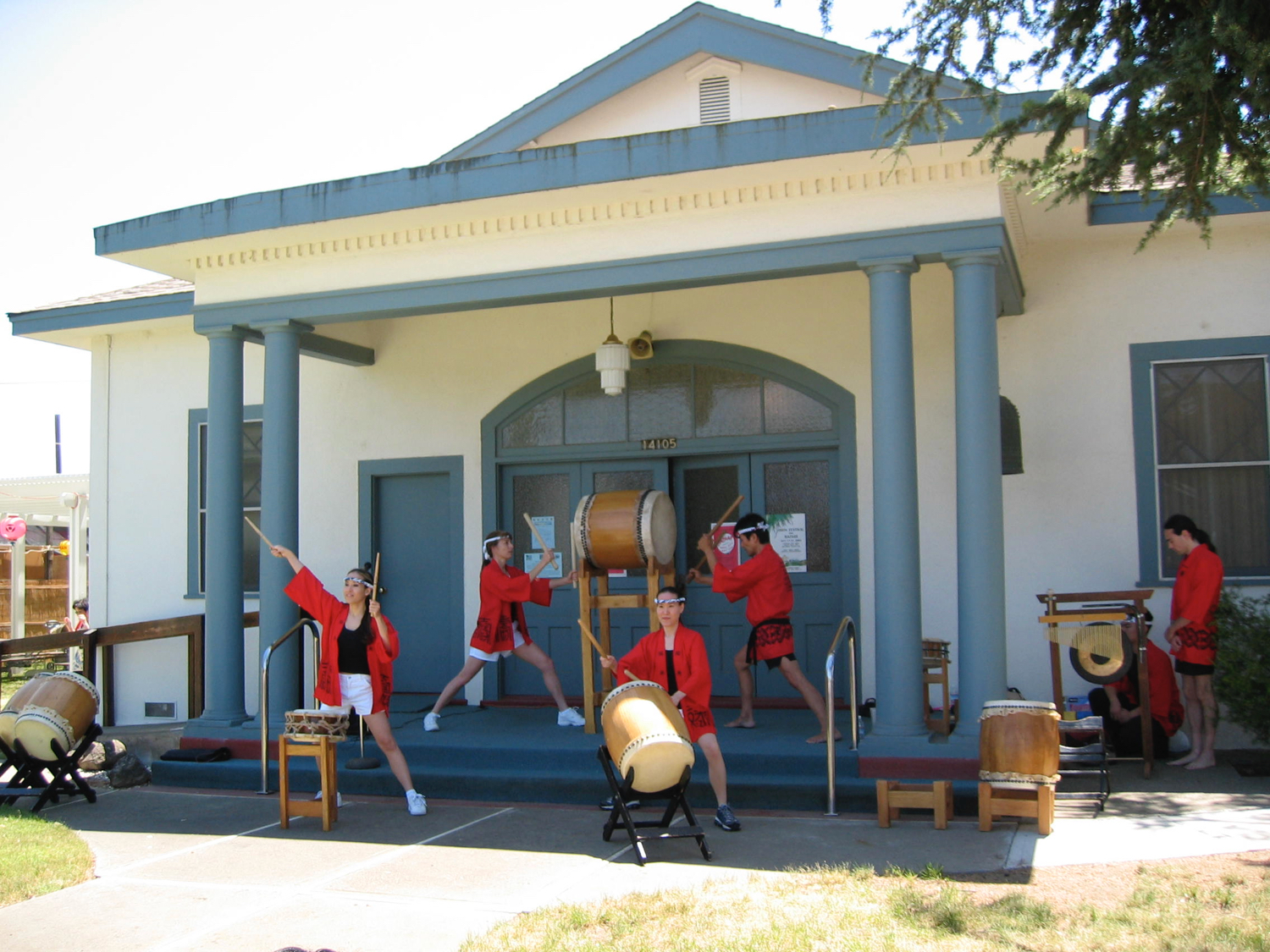
A taiko troupe performs in front of the church during their annual summer bazaar

The Walnut Grove Buddhist Church in the Japanese district was founded in 1926 to serve the spiritual needs of the community, with over 100 members prior to WWII. It also served as a temporary hostel to house families who had lost their homes following their incarceration during the war.

Through the 80s and 90s, church membership fell as many of the older generation died, although many local residents as well as the children and grandchildren of the original members continue to support the church through the popular annual summer Bazaar and Obon, providing much needed income to the church coffers.

=== Locke ===
Chan Tin-San is commonly credited as the earliest resident of Locke, California. He was the first Chinese person to construct a building on the Locke brothers' property, where he realized the business potential of the Southern Pacific wharf and warehouse. After the October 1915 fire which destroyed the Walnut Grove Chinatown, a number of Chung-San District people moved to the area and Locke was officially established.

Lee Bing, the leader of the group, financed nine of the buildings. Locke is one of the few towns in the United States built entirely by Chinese. Known as the city "built by the Chinese, for the Chinese." It was built in 1915 and burned down twice. Locke was a bustling place with gambling houses, merchant stores and a movie house all owned by the Chinese. Some of the original buildings are still standing.

=== Towers ===
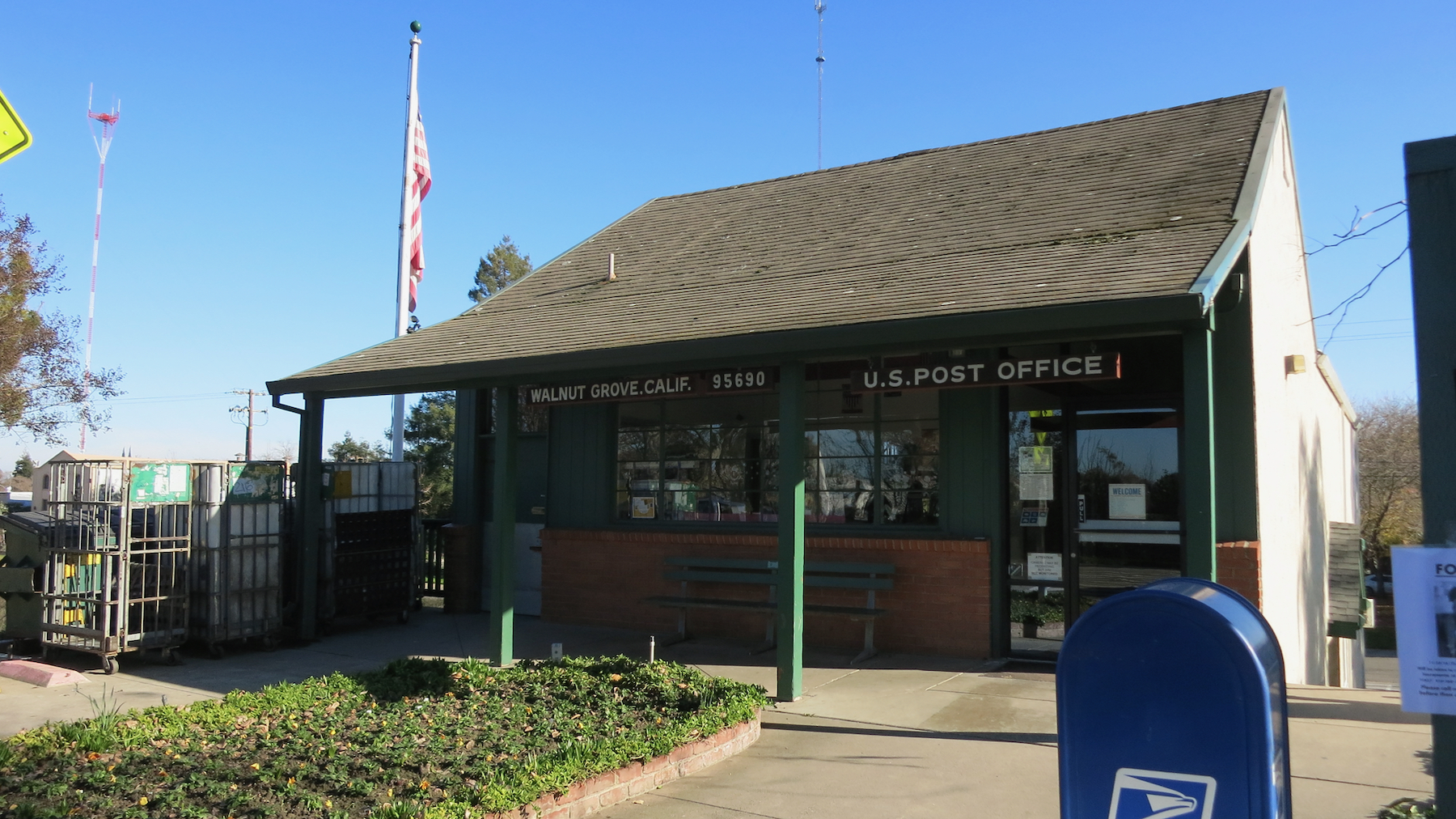
Walnut Grove Post Office 95690. The KXTV/KOVR/KCRA Tower is visible on the left side of the image.

Walnut Grove's location has made it the site of a rare collection of very tall radio and television transmission towers. The first major tower here was the KXTV/KOVR/KCRA Tower built in 1962, which dominated the skyline for over twenty years with its 1,548-foot height. In 1985 the old tower was joined by taller structures. The guyed KXTV/KOVR Tower is, with a height of 2,048 feet, one of the tallest constructions in the world. Two other guyed towers of similar height are the 1,996-foot-high Channel 40 Tower (KTXL), and the 2,000-foot-high Hearst-Argyle Tower. Towers sited here at the natural corner of the California Central Valley have line of sight coverage of flat valley floor for over 60 miles (100 kilometers) to the north and to the south-southeast, and quite good coverage into the Sierra foothills and mountains across the valley to the northeast and east. However, these towers and their guy-wires are a significant hazard to aircraft, which can otherwise freely cross most of the Central Valley at 656 feet of altitude.

== Notable people ==
- Bo Eason – former safety for University of California, Davis and the Houston Oilers, actor, playwright.
- Tony Eason – former quarterback for the University of Illinois and the New England Patriots.
- John Garamendi – Representative in U.S. Congress for California's 8th congressional district, former lieutenant governor, former insurance commissioner.
- Mike Honda – former U.S. Representative and former member of the California State Assembly.
- Kamajiro Hotta – influential Japanese immigrant farmer of the early 20th century, referred to as the Asparagus King by Walnut Grove residents.

== Government ==
In the California State Legislature, Walnut Grove is in the 3rd senatorial district, represented by Democrat Christopher Cabaldon, and in the 9th Assembly district, represented by Republican Heath Flora.

In the United States House of Representatives, Walnut Grove is in California's 7th congressional district, represented by Democrat Doris Matsui.

== In popular culture ==
In Sons of Anarchy, season 4/episode 10, "Hands", Jax Teller and Tara Knowles' family outing at Walnut Grove Park with their sons is cut short, and Tara's plan to attend a surgical conference in Providence, Oregon, at a hospital she plans to transfer to, is foiled when hit men hired by Clay Morrow abduct Tara from the park and severely wound her.
