= Walnut Grove School =

Walnut Grove School may refer to:

- Walnut Grove School (Osage, Iowa), listed on the National Register of Historic Places in Mitchell County, Iowa
- Walnut Grove School (Caneyville, Kentucky), listed on the National Register of Historic Places in Grayson County, Kentucky
- Walnut Grove Secondary School, Langley, British Columbia, Canada

== See also ==
- Walnut Grove School District (disambiguation)
