= Walnut Grove School District =

Walnut Grove School District may refer to:

- Walnut Grove Elementary School District, Arizona
- Walnut Grove R-V School District, Missouri

== See also ==
- Walnut Grove School (disambiguation)
