= Walnut Grove Buddhist Church =

Buddhist temple in California, U.S.

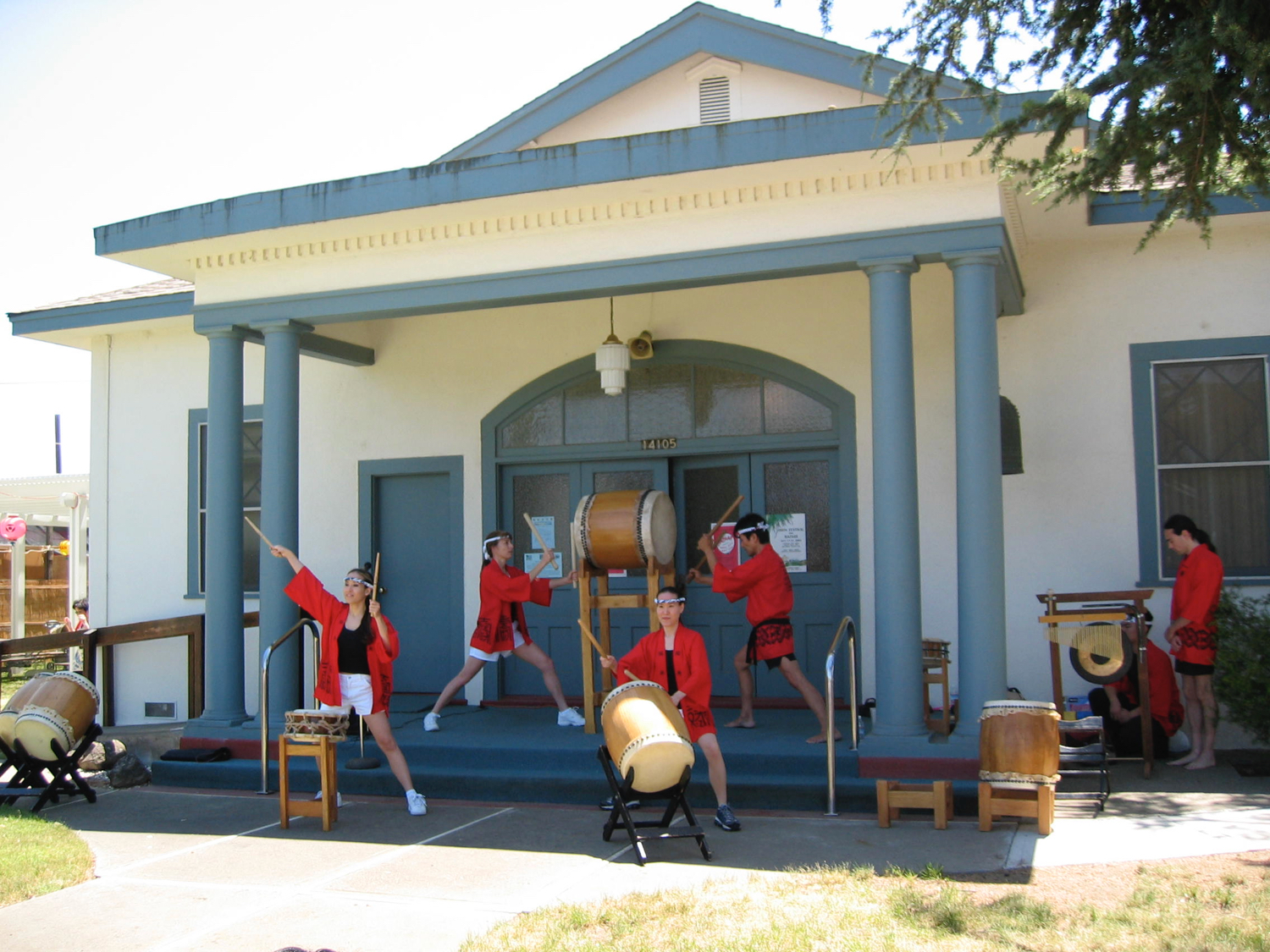
- A taiko group performs outside the temple

- Location of the temple in California Walnut Grove Buddhist Church (the United States)

Religion
- Affiliation: Buddhism
- Ecclesiastical or organizational status: Temple
- Leadership: Katsuya Kusunoki
- Status: Active

Location
- Location: Walnut Grove, near Sacramento, California
- Country: United States
- Interactive map of Walnut Grove Buddhist Church
- Coordinates: 38°14′34″N 121°30′36″W

Architecture
- Established: 1926
- Completed: 1927

Website
- walnutgrovebc.org

The Walnut Grove Buddhist Church is a Buddhist temple in the historic Japanese-American farming community of Walnut Grove, outside of Sacramento, California, in the United States. It is an affiliate of the Buddhist Churches of America.

== History ==
=== Pre-establishment ===
Walnut Grove, known to Issei Japanese as "Kawashimo," was settled by Japanese immigrants in the early 20th century. By the end of World War I, many families were established. The growth of successive generations prompted the need for religious service within the community.

Around 1923, Dharma talks (法話会 hōwakai) became a regular practice that were held within Japanese homes. Ministers from the Buddhist Church of Sacramento traveled 25 miles (40 km) to conduct these services. On other occasions, such as funerals, the community would travel to Sacramento.

In 1924, a Buddhist Sunday School was formed by Tome Yoshida with about fifteen students. The tables and benches used can still be found in her house today.

=== Establishment ===
The church was established in 1926 and the church building completed a year later in 1927. It was recognized as a branch of the Buddhist Church of Sacramento. On February 1, 1931, it broke off from the larger church and became independent with 130 members.

On January 29, 1935, the temple hosted visiting Renshi Shojo Ohtani, who led the confirmation of nearly 100 members.

On the same year of the temple's establishment, a medical health club (白菊会, shiragikukai) was started by a group of ten teenage girls. In June 1930, a group of younger children assisted in the establishment of the Young Girls Buddhist Association (YGBA, 少女会, shōjokai), serving as the equivalent of the local Young Men’s Buddhist Association (YMBA) that was established two years earlier. The Buddhist Women's Association (婦人会, funjinkai) was officially organized on January 8, 1932.In May 1938, the YMBA and YWBA merged to form the Young Buddhist Association (YBA).

=== World War II and aftermath ===
The evacuation of Japanese Americans during World War II led to the temple's closure. Japanese from the area were sent to Merced and Turlock Assembly Centers and then to the Amache, Colorado and Gila, Arizona Relocation Centers.

Immediately after the war on July 27, 1945, Shigeo Kato and his family returned to Walnut Grove; who with Tomio Matsuoka, Rev. Takeo Agatsuma (Methodist Church minister), and Ralph Sugimoto; prepared to receive other Japanese. The church building functioned as a hostel at this time.

Returnees from the Isleton area found their temple looted and damaged. The building was sold and finds donated to the Walnut Grove Buddhist Temples and New York Buddhist Academy. Isleton residents ultimately became part of the congregation at Walnut Grove.

On December 16, 1945, the reverend Takuyu Shirakawa returned and the church sponsored a combined Memorial Service and Hōonkō (報恩講) for members who had died during the war. The Buddhist Women's Association and the YBA were also reactivated at this time.

Reverend Shirakawa's successor, Reverend Seikaku Mizutani was the longest serving Rinban of the church, serving 22 years from 1950 to 1972. By the 1970s, Walnut Grove as a community faced decline as many of the original congregants' children moved to Sacramento and beyond, seeking non-agricultural jobs.

Through the 1980s and 1990s, church membership continued to fall as many of the older generation died, although many children and grandchildren of the original members still consider the church as their ancestral home, and return to support the annual summer Bazaar and Obon, providing much needed income to the church coffers.

== Clergy ==
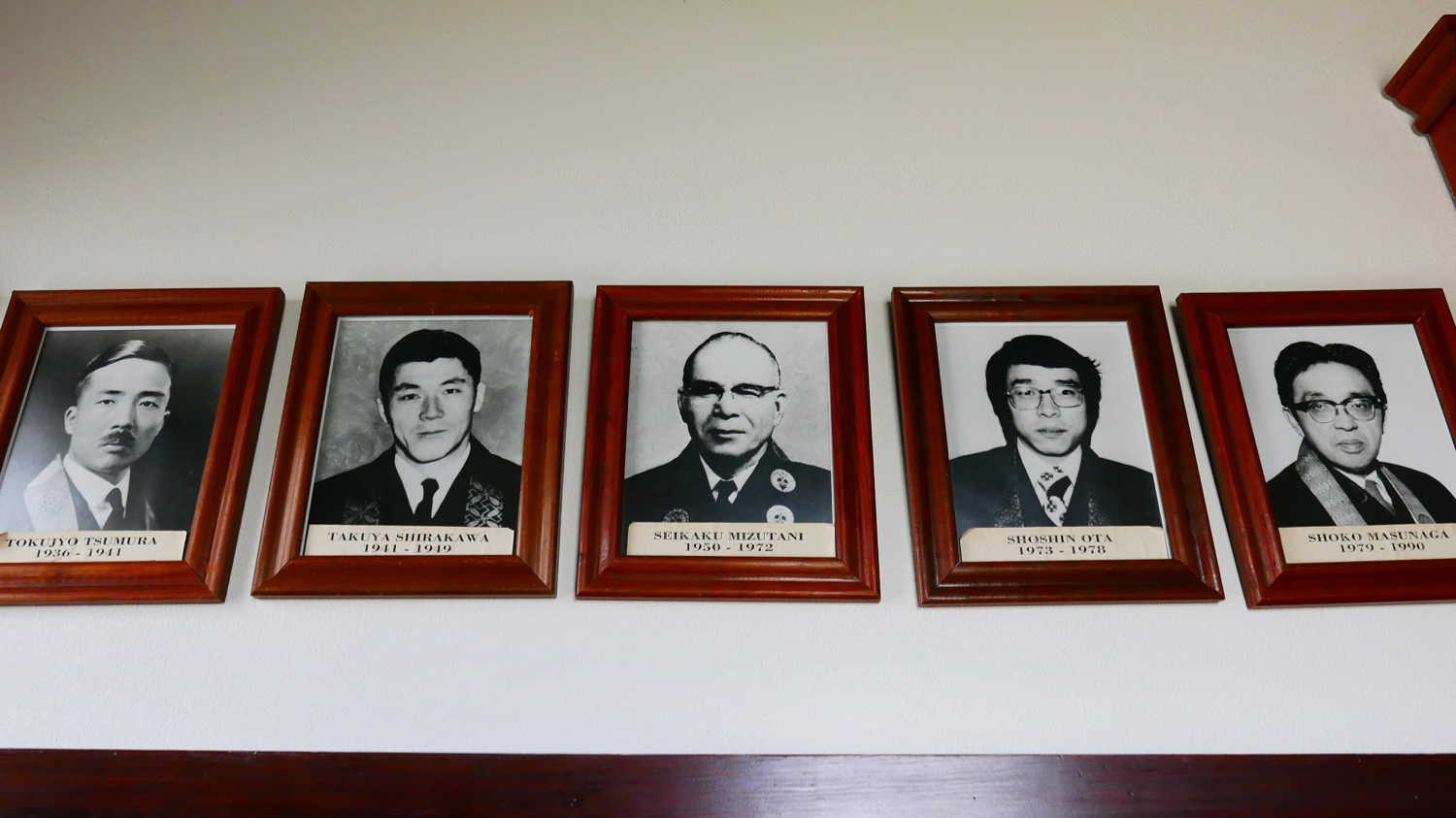
Past head priests (Rinban) of the Walnut Grove Buddhist Church

The following is a list of ministers, or Rinban, of the Walnut Grove Buddhist Church:

Name	Started	Ended	Time in office	Notes
Chonen Terakawa	1931	1936	4–5 years	
Tokujo Tsumura	1936	1941	4–5 years	
Takuyu Shirakawa	1941	1949	4–5 years	
Seikaku Mizutani	1950	1972	21–22 years	
Shoshin Ota	1973	1985	21–22 years	
Ken Fujimoto	1985	2006	20–21 years	
Harry Bridge	2007	2009	1–2 years	
Katsuya Kusunoki	2010	incumbent	15–16 years	

== See also ==
- Buddhism in California
- List of Buddhist temples in California
