= Walnut Grove Township =

Walnut Grove Township may refer to the following places in the United States:

- Walnut Grove Township, Knox County, Illinois
- Walnut Grove Township, McDonough County, Illinois
- Walnut Grove Township, Kansas
- Walnut Grove Township, Greene County, Missouri
- Walnut Grove Township, Knox County, Nebraska
- Walnut Grove Township, Granville County, North Carolina, a township in Granville County, North Carolina
- Walnut Grove Township, Wilkes County, North Carolina, a township in Wilkes County, North Carolina
- Walnut Grove Township, a township in Woods County, Oklahoma
- Walnut Grove Township, Douglas County, South Dakota, a township in Douglas County, South Dakota

== See also ==
- Walnut Grove (disambiguation)
- Walnut Township (disambiguation)
