= Tenant farmer =

Farmer whose land is owned by a landlord

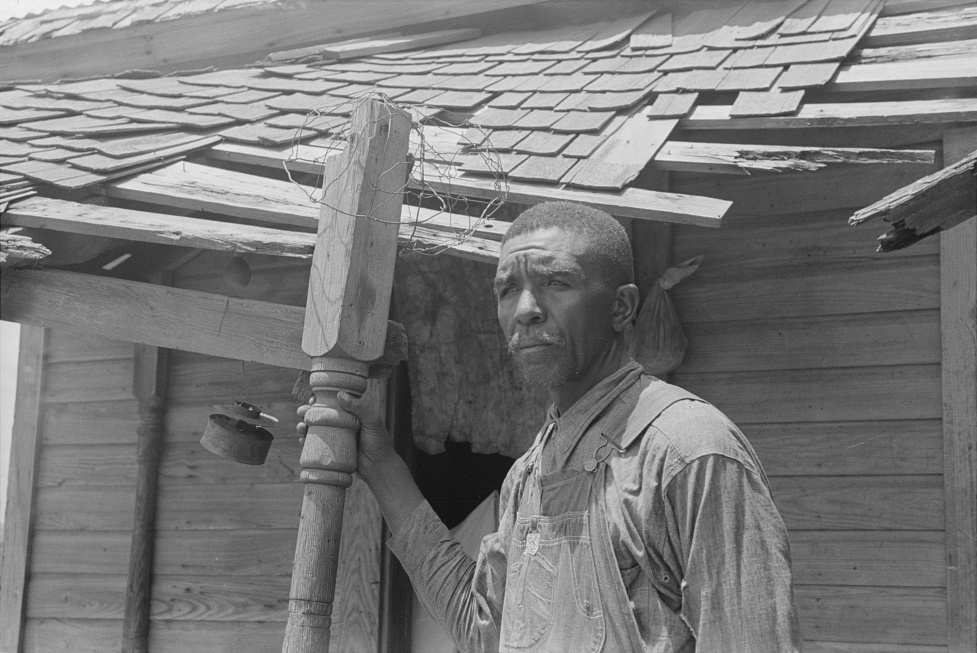
A tenant farmer on his front porch, south of Muskogee, Oklahoma (1939)

A tenant farmer is a farmer or farmworker who resides and works on land owned by a landlord. Tenant farming is an agricultural production system in which landowners contribute their land and often a measure of operating capital and management, while tenant farmers contribute their labor along with at times varying amounts of capital and management. Depending on the terms of their contract, tenants may make payments to the owner either of a fixed portion of the product, cash, or a combination. The rights the tenant has over the land, the form, and measures of payment vary across systems (geographically and chronologically). In some systems, the tenant could be evicted at whim (tenancy at will); in others, the landowner and tenant sign a contract for a fixed number of years (tenancy for years or indenture). In most developed countries in the 21st century, at least some restrictions are placed on the rights of landlords to evict tenants under normal circumstances.

== History by region ==
=== Europe ===
==== England and Wales ====
Historically, rural society utilised a three-tier structure of landowners (nobility, gentry, yeomanry), tenant farmers, and farmworkers. Originally, tenant farmers were known as peasants. Under Anglo-Norman law, almost all tenants were bonded to the land, and were therefore also villeins, but after the labour shortage occasioned by the Black Death in the mid-14th century, the number of free tenants substantially increased. Many tenant farmers became affluent and socially well connected, and employed a substantial number of labourers and managed more than one farm. Tenancy could be either in perpetuity or rotated by the owners. Cottiers (cottagers) held much less land.

The 17th century to the early 19th century witnessed the growth of large estates, and the opportunity for a farmer to hold land other than by tenancy was significantly reduced, with the result that by the 19th century, about 90% of agricultural land area and holdings were tenanted, although these figures declined markedly after World War II, to around 60% in 1950 and only 35% of agricultural land area in 1994. High rates of inheritance taxes in the postwar period led to the breakup or reduction of many large estates, allowing many tenants to buy their holdings at favourable prices.

The landmark Agricultural Holdings Act 1948 (11 & 12 Geo. 6. c. 63) was enacted at a time when war-time food rationing was still in force and sought to encourage long-term investment by tenants by granting them lifetime security of tenure. Under the Agriculture (Miscellaneous Provisions) Act 1976, security was extended to spouses and relatives of tenants for two successions, providing that they had been earning the majority of their income from the holding for five years. Succession rights were however withdrawn for new tenancies in 1984 and this was consolidated in the Agricultural Holdings Act 1986. These two statutes also laid down rules for the determination of rents by the arbitration process. The 1986 statute covered tenancies over agricultural land where the land was used for a trade or business and the definition of "agriculture" in section 96(1) was wide enough to include various uses that in themselves were not agricultural but were deemed so if ancillary to agriculture (e.g. woodlands). The essence of the code was to establish complex constraints on the landlord's ability to give the notice to quit while also converting fixed-term tenancies into yearly tenancies at the conclusion of the fixed term. In addition, there was a uniform rent ascertainment scheme contained in section 12.

It became difficult to obtain new tenancies as a result of landlords' reluctance to have a tenant protected by the 1986 act and in 1995, the government of the day, with the support of industry organizations, enacted a new market-oriented code in the form of the Agricultural Tenancies Act 1995. The protection of the 1986 act remains in respect of tenancies created prior to the existence of the 1995 act and for those tenancies falling within section 4 of the 1995 act. For all other tenancies granted on or after 1 September 1995, their regulation is within the 1995 act framework.

That act was altered with effect from 18 October 2006 by the Regulatory Reform (Agricultural Tenancies) (England and Wales) Order 2006 (SI 2006/2805), which also contains changes to the 1986 act. Tenancies granted after 18 October 2006 over agricultural land used for a trade or business will fall within the limited protection of the 1995 act so as to enjoy (provided the term is more than two years in length or there is a yearly tenancy) a mandatory minimum twelve months written notice to quit, including in respect of fixed terms. There is for all tenancies within the scope of the act a mandatory tenants' right to remove fixtures and buildings (section 8) together with compensation for improvements (Part III). The rent review provisions in Part II may be the subject of choice to a much greater extent than previously. Disputes under the act are usually, by the terms of Part IV, the subject of statutory arbitration controlled by the framework of the Arbitration Act 1996.

The current regime under the 1995 act for regulating tenancies, commonly known as Farm Business Tenancies, permits the creation of a clearly and easily terminable interest, whether by a periodic tenancy or a fixed term. In the cycle of animal husbandry and land use and improvement, the long-term effect of the Farm Business Tenancy on the landscape of Britain is not yet proven. It was predicted by landowners and other industry spokesmen that the 1995 act would create opportunities for new tenants by allowing large areas of new lettings but this has not happened in practice as most landowners have continued to favour share farming or management agreements over formal tenancies and the majority of new lettings under the act have been to existing farmers, often owner-occupiers taking on extra land at significantly higher rents than could be afforded by a traditional tenant.

==== Scotland ====
Scotland has its own independent legal system and the legislation there differs from that of England and Wales. Neither the AHA 1986 nor the ATA 1995 applies in Scotland. The relevant legislation for Scotland is rather the Agricultural Holdings (Scotland) Act 2003 with the following amendments in The Public Services Reform (Agricultural Holdings) (Scotland) Order 2011, The Agricultural Holdings (Amendment) (Scotland) Act 2012 and The Agricultural Holdings (Scotland) 2003 Remedial Order 2014. These supersede the previous legislation in the Agricultural Holdings (Scotland) Act 1991 and the Agriculture (Scotland) Act 1948.

For Scotland see Crofting, a traditional and long-established means of tenant and subsistence farming.

==== Ireland ====
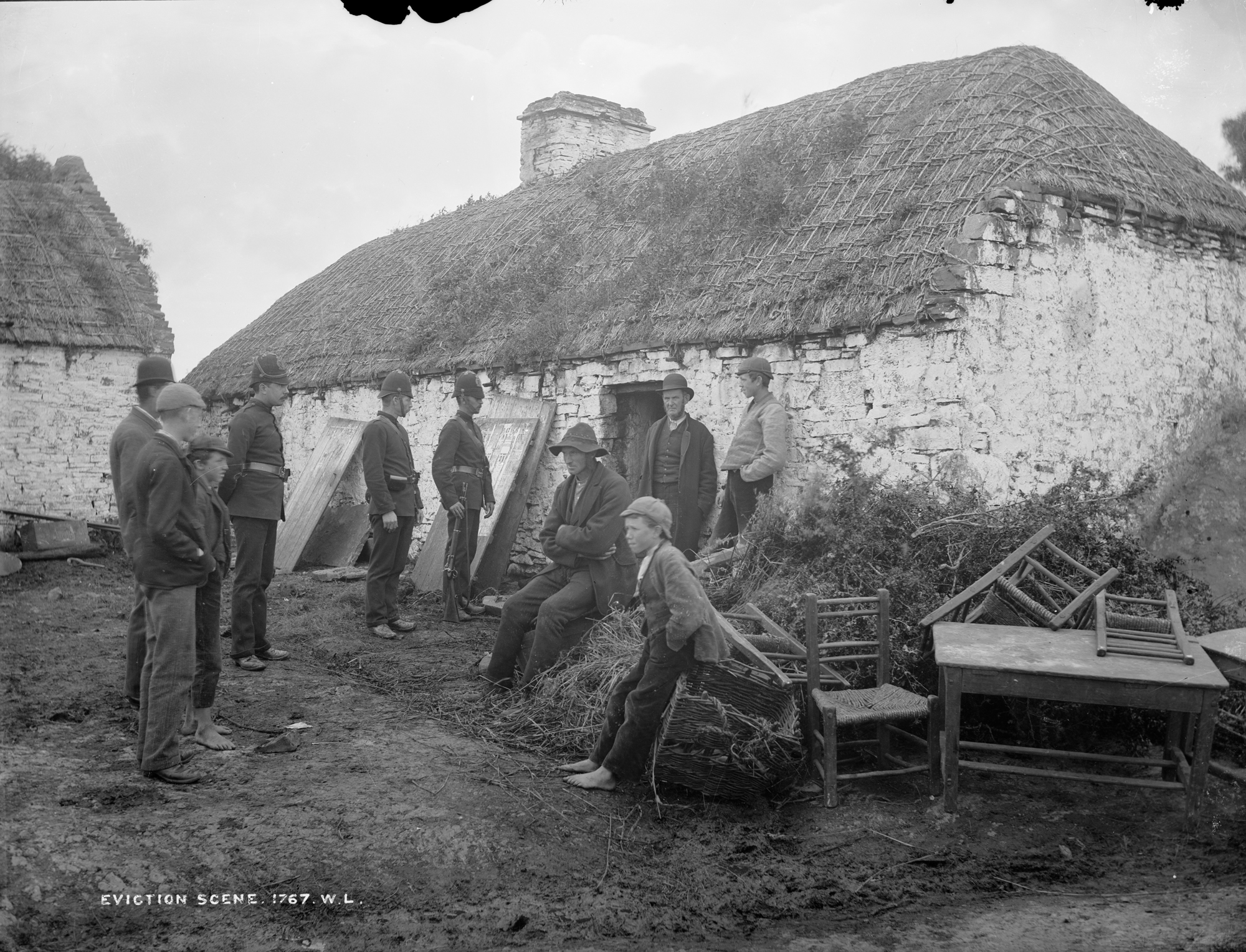
Forced eviction of Irish tenant in County Clare, c. 1888

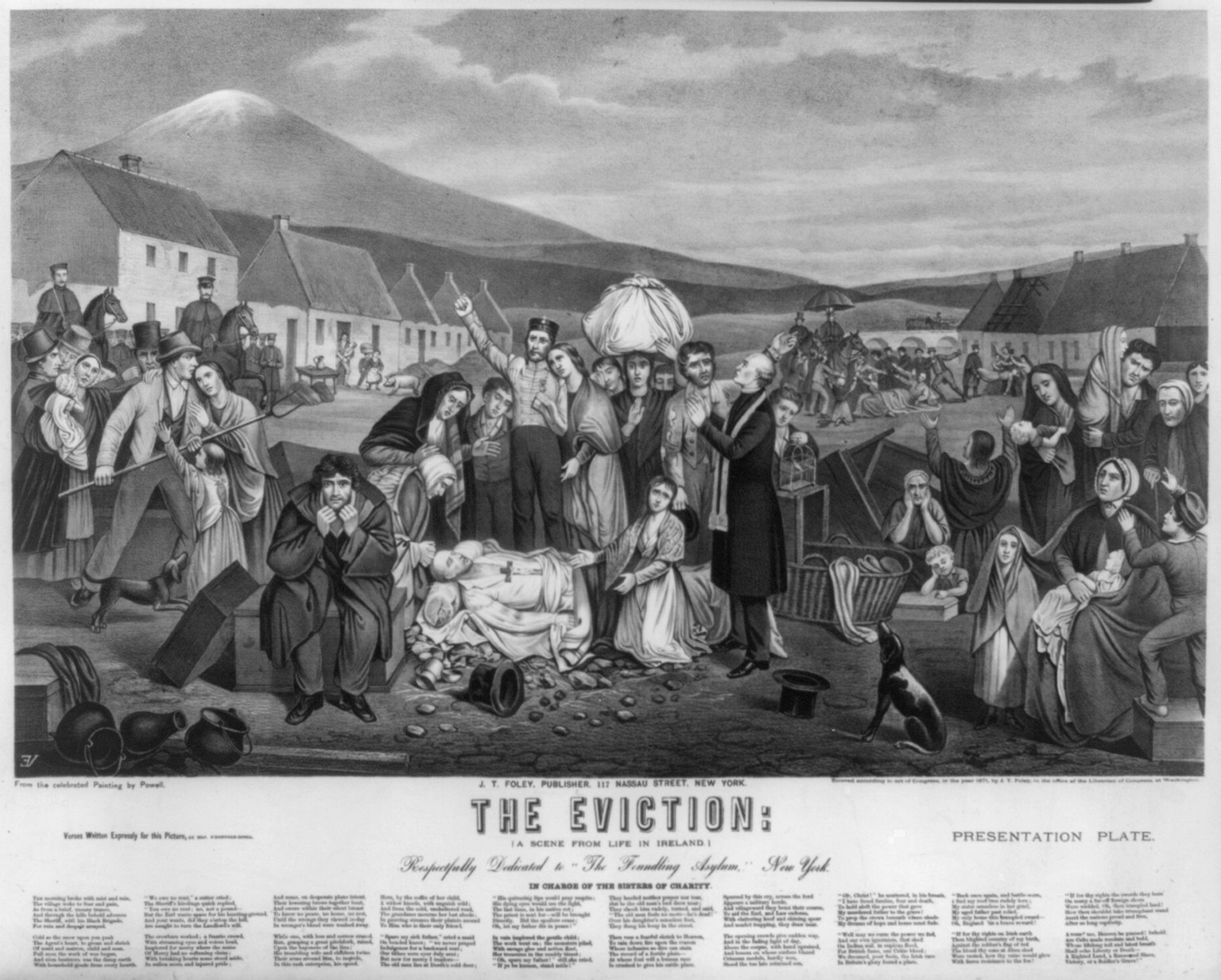
Irish tenants with their belongings after being forcibly evicted from their homes, 1871

Until about 1900, the majority of Ireland was held by landlords, as much as 97% in 1870, and rented out to tenant farmers who had to pay rent to landlords and taxes to the Church of Ireland and State. The majority of the people had no access to land. 1.5% of the population owned 33.7% of the island, and 50% of the country was in the hands of only 750 families. Absenteeism was common and detrimental to the country's progress. Tenants often sub-rented small plots on a yearly basis from local farmers paying for them by labour service by a system, known as conacre, most without any lease or land rights. Irish smallholders were similar to the cottiers in Britain.

The abuse of tenant farmers led to widespread emigration to the United States and the colonies and was a key factor within the Home Rule Movement. They also underlined a deterioration in Protestant-Catholic relationships, although there were notable elements of cooperation in reform attempts such as the Tenant Right League of the 1850s. Following the Great Famine tenant farmers were the largest class of people. Discontent led to the Land War of the 1870s onwards, the Landlord and Tenant (Ireland) Act 1870, the founding of the Land League 1879 to establish fair rents and the fixity of tenures. The movement played a key element in the unification of country and urban classes and the creation of a national identity not existing before.

The Landlord and Tenant (Ireland) Act 1870 stands out as the first attempt to resolve problems of tenants rights in Ireland and the Land Law (Ireland) Act 1881 went even further to inspire campaigners even in Wales. The Purchase of Land (Ireland) Act 1885 (48 & 49 Vict. c. 73) followed, finally the great breakthrough after the successful 1902 Land Conference, the enactment of the Irish Land Act 1903 (3 Edw. 7. c. 37) whereby the state financed tenants to completely buy out their landlords. Under the Irish Land Act 1903 and the consequential Irish Land Act 1909 (9 Edw. 7. c. 42), the national situation was completely transformed. When in March 1920, the Irish Estate Commission reviewed the development since 1903 under these acts, they estimated that 83 million sterling had been advanced for 9 million acres (36,000 km^{2}) transferred, whilst a further 2 million acres (8,100 km^{2}) were pending costing 24 million sterling. By 1914, 75% of occupiers were buying out their landlords, mostly under the two acts. In all, under the pre-UK Land Acts over 316,000 tenants purchased their holdings amounting to 11,500,000 acres (47,000 km^{2}) out of a total of 20 million in the country.

On the formation of the Irish Free State in 1922, the Irish Land Commission was reconstituted by the Land Law (Commission) Act, 1923. The commission had acquired and supervised the transfer of up to 13 million acres (53,000 km^{2}) of farmland between 1885 and 1920 where the freehold was assigned under mortgage to tenant farmers and farm workers. The focus had been on the compulsory purchase of untenanted estates so that they could be divided into smaller units for local families. In 1983, the commission ceased acquiring land; this signified the start of the end of the commission's reform of Irish land ownership, though freehold transfers of farmland still had to be signed off by the commission into the 1990s. The commission was dissolved in March 1999.

==== Scandinavia ====
Historically, despite Norway being practically a Danish province for almost 300 years before 1814, the countries of Denmark, Norway, and Sweden (with Finland) had differing approaches to land tenure.

===== Norway =====
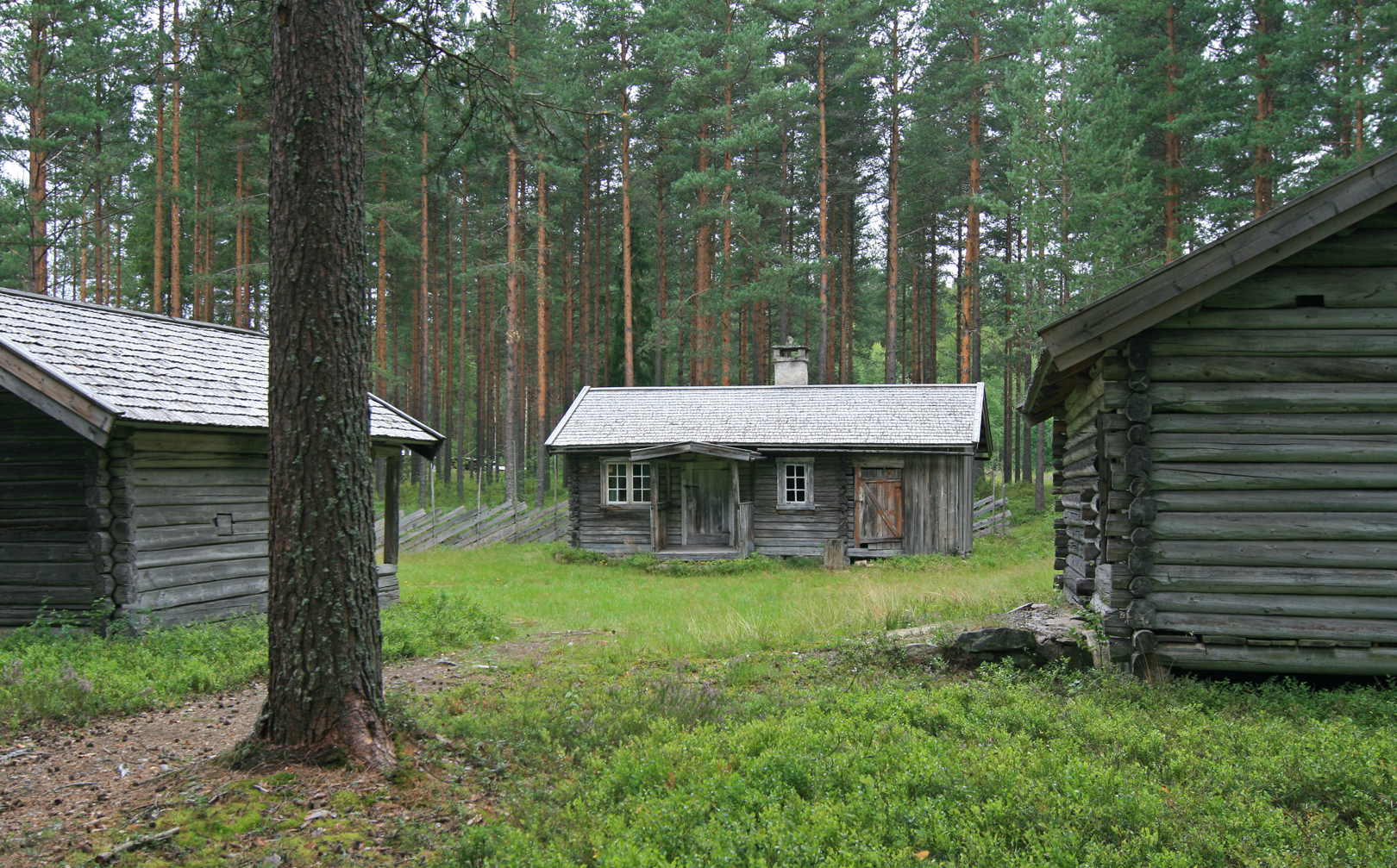
A typical Husmann residence from Hof in Hedmark

A tenant farmer in Norway was known as a husmann (plural: husmenn) and were most common in the mid-19th century when they constituted around one-quarter of the country's population. Heavy demands were placed on these tenants by their landlords, the bønder or land-owning farmers. The majority of the husmann's working hours were usually taken up by work for the landlord, leaving him little time to work on his own land or better his own situation. As a result, though the husmenn were technically free to leave the land at any time, their poor economic state made them in essence "economic serfs". Failing to own their own land also made tenant farmers ineligible to vote according to the Norwegian Constitution at the time. The number of tenant farmers in the country grew during the 19th century, rising from 48,571 in 1825 to 65,060 in 1855, the latter figure representing the height of the husmann population in Norway, most of whom lived in the eastern part of the country. Given their difficult economic and social position in Norway, many Norwegian husmenn immigrated to Canada and the United States throughout the 19th century. Following the revolutions of 1848 the husmenn's cause was taken up by Marcus Thrane. Thrane fought for the husmenn's rights at home and also encouraged them to emigrate and seek better fortunes abroad. The number of husmenn began to decline in the second half of the 19th century, and by 1910 they made up less than 5% of Norwegian society.

===== Sweden and Finland =====
The term torpare/torppari (Swedish/Finnish for crofter) refers to a slightly different type of tenant farmers, less secure than the inheritable usufruct right as åbo but sometimes with contracts as long as 50 years. The lease was, depending on the landowner's good will, in practice often transferred to a son or a widow.

Their situation was usually poor but, contrary to in Denmark, they were in theory always free to leave. The croft's lease was typically paid in the form of corvée. They would work their own land as well as that of a landowning farmer (bonde), noble or other. In some aspects their situation made them easy victims of impressment. Population growth and landreforms (enskiftet) contributed to a 19th century increase of crofts but, particularly in Sweden, also to a shift from tenant farmers to farm laborers (statare) hired on yearlong contracts, paid in-kind.

The lives of torpare and statare were described by prominent Swedish and Finnish novelists and writers such as Ivar Lo-Johansson, Jan Fridegård, Väinö Linna (Under the North Star trilogy) and Moa Martinson. The Statare system was abolished in 1918 (Finland) and 1945 (Sweden), the Torpare system more gradually.

=== Asia ===
==== Japan ====
In Japan, landowners turned over their land to families of tenant farmers to manage. During the Meiji period, Japanese tenant farmers were traditionally cultivators rather than capitalistic or entrepreneurial venture by nature, paid in kind for their labors. Approximately 30% of land was held by tenants. Many aspects of Tokugawa feudalism continued. After WWII, the Farm Land Reform Law of 1946 banned absentee landlordism, re-distributing land and permitted tenants to buy. By the 1950s, it virtually eliminated the landlord-tenant relationship.

=== Americas ===
==== Canada ====
From the nineteenth century on, tenant farming immigrants came to Canada not just from the British Isles but also the United States.

==== United States ====
Tenant farming has been important in the US from the pre-Revolutionary period to the present. Tenants typically bring their own tools and animals. To that extent it is distinguished from being a sharecropper, which is a tenant farmer who usually provides no capital and pays fees with crops.

A hired hand is an agricultural employee even though he or she may live on the premises and exercise a considerable amount of control over the agricultural work, such as a foreman. A sharecropper is a farm tenant who pays rent with a portion (often half) of the crop he raises and who brings little to the operation besides his family labor; the landlord usually furnishing working stock, tools, fertilizer, housing, fuel, and seed, and often providing regular advice and oversight.

Tenant farming in the North was historically a step on the "agricultural ladder" from hired hand or sharecropper taken by young farmers as they accumulated enough experience and capital to buy land (or buy out their siblings when a farm was inherited).

About two-thirds of sharecroppers were white, the rest black. Sharecroppers, the poorest of the poor, organized for better conditions. The racially integrated Southern Tenant Farmers Union made gains for sharecroppers in the 1930s. Sharecropping had diminished in the 1940s due to the Great Depression, farm mechanization, and other factors.

===== Black Belt conditions =====
In the Black Belt in the American South until the mid 20th century, the predominant agricultural system involved white land owners and African-American tenant farmers. Very little cash changed hands. The few local banks were small and cash was scarce and had to be hoarded for taxes. Landowners needed a great deal of labor at harvest time to pick the cash crop, cotton. The typical plan was to divide old plantations into small farms that were assigned to the tenants. Throughout the year the tenants lived rent-free. They tended their own gardens. Every week, they bought food and supplies on credit through the local country store. At harvest time, the tenants picked the cotton, and turned it all over to the landowners. They sold the cotton on the national market and used part of the funds to pay the debts owed to the country store. The cycle then started all over again. Landowners also worked some of the land directly, using black labor paid in cash. The landowners held all the political power, and fought vigorously against government welfare programs that would provide cash that would undermine the cashless system. Economic historians Lee Alston and Joseph Ferrie (1999) describe the system as essentially an informal contract that:

bound employer and worker through the provision of housing, medical care, and other in-kind services along with cash wages. At its heart, it guaranteed a stable and adequate labor supply to the planter. Though restricted by the directives of the planter, workers in return received some measure of economic stability, including a social safety net, access to financial capital, and physical protection in an often-violent society.

Tenant farmers often had agricultural managers who supervised their activities. In 1907, for instance, J. H. Netterville began employment for the Panola Company, an agricultural business founded by William Mackenzie Davidson in the rich farming area of St. Joseph in Tensas Parish in northeastern Louisiana in the Mississippi River delta country. In its heyday, Panola controlled some eleven thousand acres, two-thirds planted in cotton and the other third in grains. Netterville became general manager of three highly profitable Panola properties, the Balmoral, Blackwater, and Wyoming plantations near Newellton, in which capacity he supervised 125 African-American tenant farming families, with little strife and great ease, according to reports from that period.

==== Latin America ====
For tenant farmers and other landholding arrangements in Latin America, see Peasant#Latin American farmers.

== In literature and media ==
- Tenant farmers feature in several biblical narratives, such as the account in Matthew 21 of the wicked tenants or husbandmen.
- The Emigrants, a 1971 Swedish film in which tenant farmers emigrate to the United States
- Plain Folk of the Old South, 1949 book, about U.S. before 1860

== See also ==
- Land reform by country
- Peasant
- Serfdom
- Metayage system of sharecropping
- Rural tenancy
- Sharecropping
- Verdingkinder
- Colonus (person)
- Kamajiro Hotta
