= California Alien Land Law of 1913 =

California statute

California State Legislature
- Assembly voted: 72-3
- Senate voted: 35-2
- Signed into law: Yes
- Governor: Hiram Johnson
- Code: None (at large)

Status: Struck down

The California Alien Land Law of 1913 (also known as the Webb–Haney Act) prohibited "aliens ineligible for citizenship" from owning agricultural land or possessing long-term leases over it, but permitted leases lasting up to three years. It affected the Chinese, Indian, Japanese, and Korean immigrant farmers in California. Implicitly, the law was primarily directed at the Japanese who were the subject of much hostility.

It passed 35–2 in the State Senate and 72–3 in the State Assembly and was co-written by attorney Francis J. Heney and California state attorney general Ulysses S. Webb at the behest of Governor Hiram Johnson. Japan's Consul General Kametaro Iijima and lawyer Juichi Soyeda lobbied against the law. In a letter to the United States Secretary of State, the Japanese government via the Japanese Minister of Foreign Affairs called the law "essentially unfair and inconsistent... with the sentiments of amity and good neighborhood which have presided over the relations between the two countries," and noted that Japan felt it was "in disregard of the spirit of the existing treaty between Japan and the United States." The law was meant to discourage immigration from Asia, and to create an inhospitable climate for immigrants already living in California.

== History and context ==
Leading up to the passage of the 1913 Alien Land Law, there had been growing anti-Asian prejudice in California and in the United States in general, first against the Chinese during the 19th century, culminating with the Chinese Exclusion Act of 1882, and then against the Japanese during the 20th century. Anti-Japanese sentiment was often expressed in racist Yellow Peril arguments.

In 1900, there was an influx of over 12,000 Japanese immigrants to the US mainland, many of whom had just been released from indentured labor with Hawaii's 1898 annexation. Many Japanese immigrants settled in California and relocated to rural areas after they initially landed in cities. Farming became the major economic foundation for the Japanese population in California, and they saw it as a way to prove their productive abilities and to establish a sense of permanency in their new nation. Gradually, many moved from farm labor into truck farming and filled the niche market for perishable crops.

The sudden increases in Japanese immigration in that and subsequent years spurred many anti-Japanese political and organizational movements in California, and the introduction of anti-Asian legislation to the California legislature, all of which influenced public sentiment. In addition, some feared that the Japanese were attempting to overtake white control of California's farmland. The Los Angeles Times and groups such as the Anti-Asiatic Association were vocal instigators of the anti-Japanese movement. In 1907, in accordance with the Gentlemen's Agreement, the United States and Japan agreed to limit Japanese migration to the United States, with Japan agreeing that it would stop issuing passports to persons intending to migrate as laborers who had no established future residence in the United States or had no family members already in the United States.

The Japanese possessed the right to lease and own land in the United States for residential and commercial use based on the 1911 American treaty with Japan. In 1910, most Japanese were working in the agricultural and fishing industries. Rights to agricultural land, unprotected by treaty, thus became the focus for the Alien Land Laws, as state-level deterrents to immigration were sought in a dearth of federal-level involvement.

The Japanese presence in California as agricultural laborers and tenant farmers rapidly grew during the first two decades of the 20th century. They filled a labor void in farming previously occupied by the Chinese, whose numbers had sharply declined with the passage of the Chinese Exclusion Act. Especially through tenant farming, Japanese families hoped to save enough money to eventually purchase their own land. Though it was meant to decrease immigration, the 1913 law likely had relatively little actual impact on Japanese farmers, and in fact, after the passage of the 1913 law, their numbers rose. Many Japanese immigrants, or issei, circumvented that law by transferring the title of their land to their American-born children, or nisei, who were US citizens. By 1915, three quarters of the vegetables consumed by Los Angeles residents were grown by Japanese.

== California Alien Land Law of 1913 ==
At the start of 1913, the California legislature considered approximately 40 anti-Japanese measures, many of which related to land ownership.

The Woodrow Wilson administration discouraged the legislation and sought to persuade Democratic lawmakers to vote against it.

The measure passed the Senate by 35–2 on May 2, 1913 while the measure passed the Assembly on May 3, 1913 by 72–3. Governor Hiram Johnson signed the bill into law on May 17, 1913.

At the time of the legislation's passage, there were at most 50,000 Japanese individuals in California (out of a total California population of 2.5 million). The Japanese population owned 12,726 acres (out of 27 million acres of improved or unimproved land in California).

== California Alien Land Law of 1920 ==
The California Alien Land Law of 1920 continued the 1913 law while filling many loopholes, such as: leasing of land for a period of three years or less was no longer allowed; owning of stock in companies that acquired agricultural land was forbidden; and guardians or agents of ineligible aliens were required to submit an annual report on their activities.

The 1920 Alien Land Law was passed in reaction to the intensification of anti-Japanese sentiment, but failed to stem Japanese immigration to California. The law was approved by the voters after being proposed by the California State Legislature. It passed with a vote of 668,438 to 222,086. The 1920 law was amended in 1923 to further fill wording-related loopholes.

There is not complete agreement about the effects of the 1920 law. It is thought by some historians to have had a significant negative impact on Japanese involvement in agriculture. For example, the amount of agricultural land controlled by Japanese decreased by approximately 40 percent between 1920 and 1930, and total acres farmed by Japanese persons declined by 47 percent. During the 1920s, there was a general decline in the agricultural economy in California and elsewhere in the United States, which would have partially contributed to the sudden downturn in Japanese farming. Many Japanese were also able to evade the law, often by claiming to be farm "managers." There were at least sixteen prosecutions of Japanese for violations of the Alien Land Law from 1920 to 1940, but there were likely many more. Although the Alien Land Laws made farming more difficult for them, the Japanese still managed to maintain a fairly high level of economic success in the agricultural industry. In 1915, Japanese Foreign Minister Komei Kato likely spoke for many Japanese when he expressed the sentiment that Japanese immigrants were dismayed by being singled out in such a fashion by the Alien Land Law legislation.

== Related court cases ==
In 1918, California v. Jukichi Harada was resolved in Riverside Superior Court in favor of Harada, allowing the Harada family to keep the home purchased in the names of their three American-born children by affirming their 14th Amendment rights. The outcome of this case did not alter California's alien land laws, and the parents, Japanese immigrants Jukichi and Ken Harada, remained ineligible for citizenship for the remainder of their lives.

In 1923, the laws were upheld in the United States Supreme Court and were determined not to be in violation of the Fourteenth Amendment to the United States Constitution.

The 1946 Supreme Court of California case People v. Oyama reaffirmed the 1923 decision, determining that Japanese immigrant Kajiro Oyama had attempted to evade the Alien Land Laws by purchasing farmland that he placed in the name of his son, who was a U.S. citizen. In fact, Oyama's petition to be named as his son's guardian in order to have authority over the land had been approved by a local court. This method was a major way in which the Japanese were able to acquire agricultural land during this period, since most other options were closed to them. The case was then reviewed by the United States Supreme Court in Oyama v. California after petitioning by the Oyamas and their supporters. The majority opinion held that Fred Oyama's rights as a U.S. citizen to take and hold property had been violated by the state of California. The decision was arguably instrumental in helping to bring about a shift in attitudes toward the Japanese and their property rights.

The Alien Land Laws were invalidated in 1952 by the Supreme Court of California as a violation of the equal protection clause of the Fourteenth Amendment to the United States Constitution in Sei Fujii v. California. Fujii was a longtime Los Angeles resident, but was not a U.S. citizen. He alleged that the law violated the California and United States Constitutions, and that it also went against the spirit of the United Nations Charter to which the United States was bound by treaty. The California District Court of Appeal had decided in 1950 that the Alien Land Law was in violation of Articles 55 and 56 of the United Nations Charter. The Supreme Court of California then ordered the case transferred for hearing and settlement, as it was determined to be a sufficiently important question of law.

== Criticism ==
The laws are widely held to have been discriminatory measures specifically targeting the Japanese, spurred by fears about the increasing number of Japanese immigrants settling in California. The choice to apply the laws only to those aliens ineligible for citizenship rather than to all aliens meant that European aliens would not be affected. Because of this, the bill was decidedly directed at Asians and specifically at the Japanese, who had become a strong presence in the agricultural labor market as well as in the control of farms. The Alien Land Laws were part of a larger trend of attempted discrimination against the Japanese through policy in California during the early 20th century.

== Related acts ==
Eight other American states passed restrictive land-ownership laws during the years 1913–25. These states were Arizona, Washington, Texas, Louisiana, New Mexico, Idaho, Montana, and Oregon. Arkansas, Minnesota, Nebraska, Utah, and Wyoming followed with the passage of Alien Land Laws during the World War II years.

Until 2018, Florida was the only state that had not repealed its Alien Land Law. A 1926 amendment was buried in a provision to the 'Basic Rights' paragraph of the Florida Constitution (Article 1, Section 2):

. . . the ownership, inheritance, disposition and possession of real property by aliens ineligible to citizenship may be regulated or prohibited by law.

== See also ==
- Leonard M. Landsborough, California agriculturalist who bought land for Japanese
- Issei
