= Kametaro Iijima =

Japanese diplomat

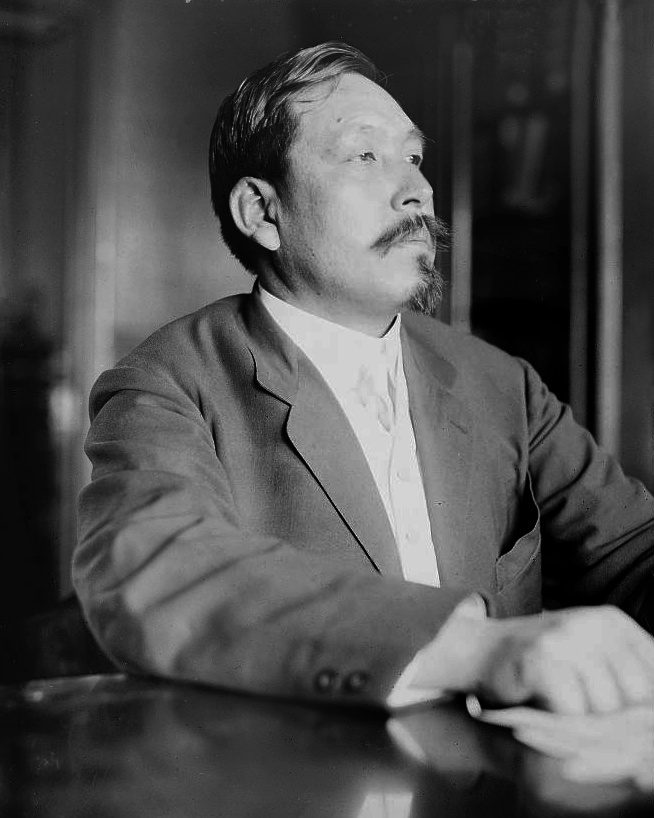
Kametaro Iijima in 1913

Kametaro Iijima (飯島 亀太郎, Iijima Kametarō) was Japan's Consul General in 1913. He arrived in the United States in June 1913 to lobby against the California Alien Land Law of 1913 while he was stationed in New York City. In 1914 his daughter, Mosa Iijima (1910–?), was hit by the car of Diamond Jim Brady.
