= Walnut Grove Farm =

Walnut Grove Farm may refer to the following places in the United States:

- Walnut Grove Farm (Knoxville, Illinois), listed on the National Register of Historic Places in Illinois
- Walnut Groves Farm, Bloomfield, Kentucky, listed on the National Register of Historic Places listings in Nelson County, Kentucky
- Walnut Grove Farm (Shawsville, Virginia), listed on the National Register of Historic Places in Montgomery County, Virginia
