= NBC 36 =

NBC 36 may refer to one of the following television stations in the United States:

== Current ==
- KMIR-TV in Palm Springs, California
- KNGC-LD in Iowa, Louisiana
  - Local translator for KPLC in Lake Charles, Louisiana
- KXAN-TV in Austin, Texas
- WCNC-TV in Charlotte, North Carolina

== Former ==
- KTVU (Stockton, California) (1954 to 1955)
