= Early prime time =

American TV programming practice

In American television, early prime time is a programming practice of airing television prime time programming an hour earlier than normal. It is most applicable in the Pacific Time Zone, where prime time programming generally airs from 8 to 11 p.m. (as on the East Coast), as opposed to 7 to 10 p.m. as in the Central and Mountain time zones.

Interest by network affiliates on the West Coast in moving their prime time schedules up an hour to account for changing lifestyles and viewing habits took root most notably in Northern California, where NBC permitted KCRA-TV in Sacramento to experiment with an early prime time schedule beginning in 1991. In nearby San Francisco, KRON-TV (the NBC affiliate) and KPIX-TV (the CBS affiliate) both began using early prime time in 1992; KPIX was joined by KMST in Monterey in adopting early prime. In the case of the San Francisco stations, the NBC and CBS affiliates wanted to compete with the dominant 10 p.m. newscast of Fox affiliate KTVU. However, ABC refused to switch its San Francisco station, KGO-TV, and generally barred its affiliates from adopting the practice. While the only stations to adopt early prime were in Northern California, other stations in the Pacific Time Zone were supportive of the idea.

Early prime improved the stations' ratings for their late newscasts, moved from 11 to 10 p.m., but reduced ratings for the first hour of prime time. It also cost the stations valuable local advertising inventory in the 7 to 8 p.m. hour known as prime access, when stations air syndicated shows. KMST reverted to normal prime time after a year in January 1993, largely for technical and financial reasons. Under strong pressure by NBC, KCRA and KRON abandoned early prime in September 1993, while KPIX continued the practice until 1998; it was credited for raising ratings for The Late Show with David Letterman. The last new network affiliate to adopt early prime scheduling was KOVR in Sacramento, which switched from ABC to CBS in 1995 and concurrently began airing prime time at 7 p.m. KOVR continues this practice, even after its acquisition by CBS in 2005.

== Conception and adoption ==
As early as 1982, KRON-TV, the NBC affiliate in San Francisco owned by Chronicle Broadcasting, began to advocate for the network to allow its West Coast affiliates to air prime time an hour earlier. Francis Martin, Chronicle's president, originally pitched the concept to the network as a way to bust the network out of third place in the national ratings. Another reason the stations wanted to see the concept put into practice was that television viewing peaked earlier on the West Coast than it did on the East Coast. In San Diego, viewing reached its evening peak at 9:45 p.m. and then fell off an hour later. Executives at KCRA-TV in Sacramento cited studies showing that potential audiences were 50 percent larger at 10 p.m. than at 11 p.m.; a later survey for San Francisco's CBS affiliate, Group W–owned KPIX-TV, found that 42 percent of Bay Area TV viewers were in bed by 10:59 p.m.

Throughout the 1980s, NBC's West Coast affiliates, led by Amy McCombs of KRON-TV, agitated for an earlier prime time start to take advantage of the larger use of televisions at 10 p.m. as opposed to 11 p.m. and increase ratings for their late local newscasts and therefore station revenues. In 1989, NBC network president Pierson Mapes told the San Francisco Chronicle that there was a "50/50" chance of the network approving a test in 1990 in some West Coast city, possibly Seattle. However, he expressed reservations that moving prime time earlier would reduce viewing among the 18–49 age group, desirable with advertisers. That November, NBC met its 17 West Coast affiliates at an event in Los Angeles; of those stations (excluding NBC-owned KNBC in Los Angeles), 15 were in favor of early prime. Meanwhile, KRON got to try out early prime time for a week in October 1989, in the wake of the 1989 Loma Prieta earthquake; the network approved the station to move its late news up to 10 p.m. as a "public service" to commuters affected by earthquake-induced traffic snarls. The experiment went poorly in the week; ratings for The Cosby Show fell by two-thirds as other NBC programs saw ratings declines.

== Northern California tests ==
The West Coast stations renewed their push for early prime in 1991. KCRA general manager John Kueneke described installing a 10 p.m. newscast as his station's top priority for the year. In July, NBC approved KCRA to begin early prime scheduling as a 8 1/2-month trial beginning September 16, 1991; the station also agreed to compensate NBC if ratings for network shows declined in the form of reduced compensation payments. KCRA concurrently filed for a waiver of the Prime Time Access Rule (PTAR), a guideline from the Federal Communications Commission (FCC) that prevented more than three hours of network programming from airing in the period from 7 to 11 p.m., so that it could move The Tonight Show Starring Johnny Carson to 10:35 p.m.; the commission granted this on August 29. For KCRA, the November 1991 sweeps period bore out the strategy; the station was competitive against syndicated programming in the 7 p.m. hour, and its news at 10 attracted more viewers than the 11 p.m. newscasts in the market. Additionally, NBC's late night programs—The Tonight Show and Saturday Night Live—saw ratings increases. The switch to early prime in Sacramento affected KRBK, which aired 9 and 9:30 p.m. newscasts, more than the 10 p.m. news on KTXL.

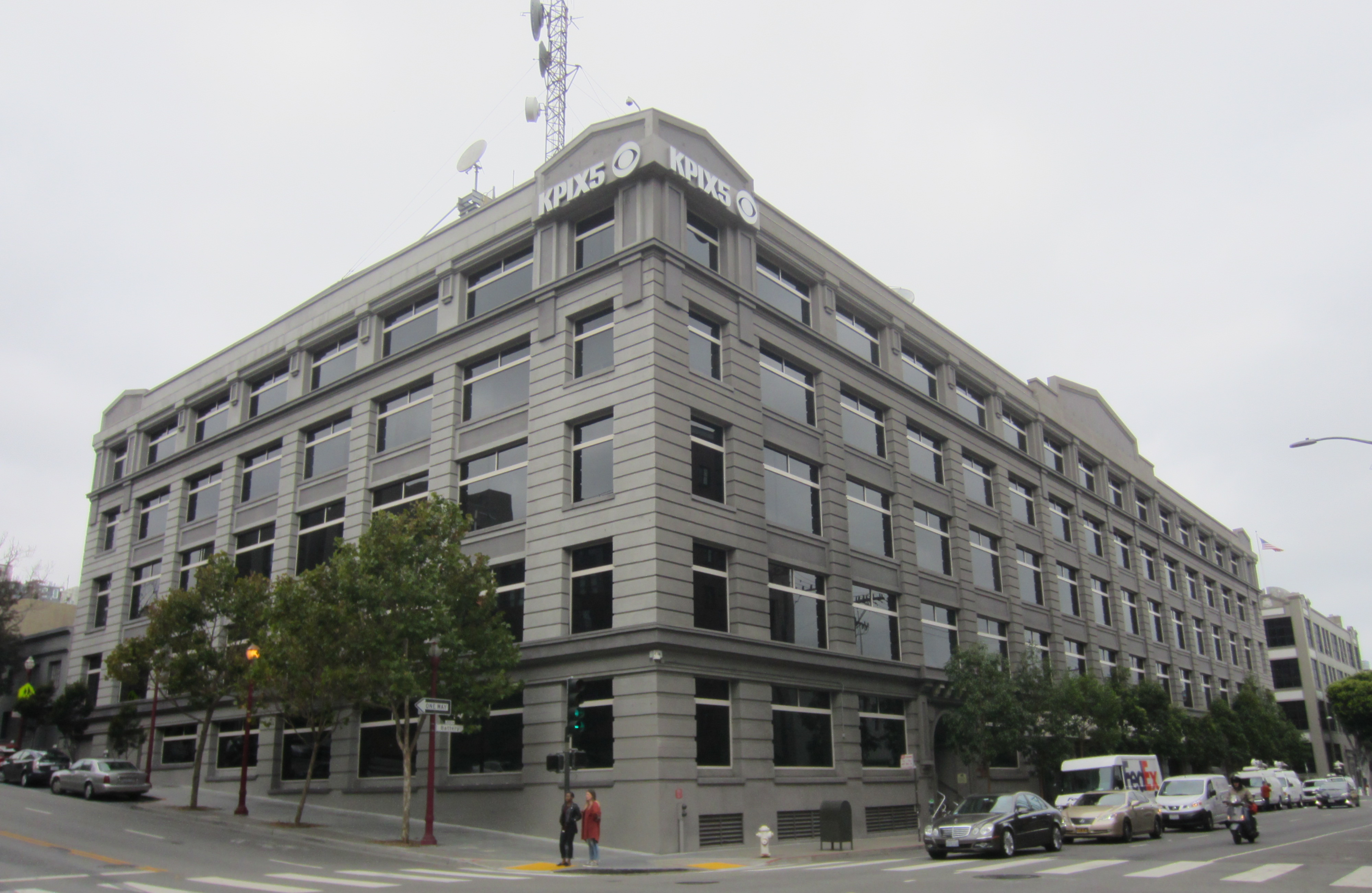
The studios of KPIX in San Francisco. KPIX used early prime time from February 1992 to September 1998.

The KCRA approval was expected to start a domino effect of stations being allowed to test early prime. KPIX began analyzing the prospects of an early prime switch, even as CBS president Howard Stringer generally resisted the idea. KPIX continued to talk with the network and was approved in December to switch to early prime beginning in February 1992. Days later, KRON received similar approval from NBC. Other potential rationales for KRON and KPIX to switch were cited in the press. Bill Mann called the lifestyle argument a "smokescreen": he believed that the stations would earn more money selling all of the local advertising time in the 10 p.m. newscasts than the limited local ad time in network programming. Ron Miller of The Mercury News retrospectively noted that stations envied the news ratings of San Francisco–market station KTVU, whose 10 p.m. newscast was the Bay Area ratings leader.

A switch to early prime provided a tradeoff that potentially could hurt two constituencies. One was stations producing 10 p.m. newscasts, most notably KTVU. Another group was syndicators of programming to air in the "early fringe" or "prime access" hour from 7 to 8 p.m., during which network-affiliated stations could not air reruns of network series or network-supplied programming because of the PTAR. Their switch was the reverse of that of the local affiliates; by exchanging the 7 p.m. hour for the 10 p.m. hour, their potential ratings would decline. One San Francisco-market program executive told Bill Mann of the Oakland Tribune that syndicators were "worried sick" about a switch. When KRON switched to early prime, King World Productions immediately moved to keep Wheel of Fortune and Jeopardy! in access by moving them to KGO-TV, which had been expected to pick up the shows in September. King World was estimated to generate one-sixth of its revenue in access hours from stations on the West Coast, making it particularly sensitive to early prime-induced time slot changes. In early prime scheduling (and the Central and Mountain time zones), access is a single half-hour at 6:30 p.m. instead of an hour.

Two other stations came close to joining their counterparts. KXTV, the CBS affiliate in Sacramento, continued to contemplate switching to early prime; its general manager, Jim Saunders, told the San Francisco Chronicle, "In my opinion, 7 to 10 works better everywhere except in one city, and that's New York, where decisions get made." The remaining NBC affiliate in the three markets was KSBW in Salinas, which announced it would switch to early prime beginning February 8, 1992, the same day as KMST. Two weeks later, however, the station changed its mind and announced it would continue with traditional prime time, having originally guessed that ABC would follow suit. ABC, however, did not like the idea; it refused to switch KGO-TV or permit its San Jose affiliate, KNTV, to do so. This decision proved beneficial for KGO, as it found itself the only local newscast at 11 p.m. with ratings described as "impressive" by Al Morch of the San Francisco Examiner. While KCRA had been permitted to air The Tonight Show at 10:35 with a PTAR waiver, the FCC in August 1992 denied the same to KRON and KPIX. KRON by that point had cut the original hour-long newscast to 30 minutes and programmed the syndicated Entertainment Tonight at 10:30.

Even though early prime never left California, there was interest in the concept in other Pacific Time Zone cities. For instance, the CBS affiliates in Seattle and Portland—KIRO-TV and KOIN—hoped to join KPIX in adopting early prime.

== Decline ==
On January 4, 1993, KMST ceased early prime scheduling, citing underwhelming viewer response as well as financial and technical considerations. CBS had broadcast a timeshifted feed of network programming to KPIX and KMST, jointly financed by the two stations. KPIX decided in late 1992 to instead purchase equipment to delay the East Coast feed of network programming and reair it at appropriate times, which was prohibitively expensive for the smaller Monterey station.

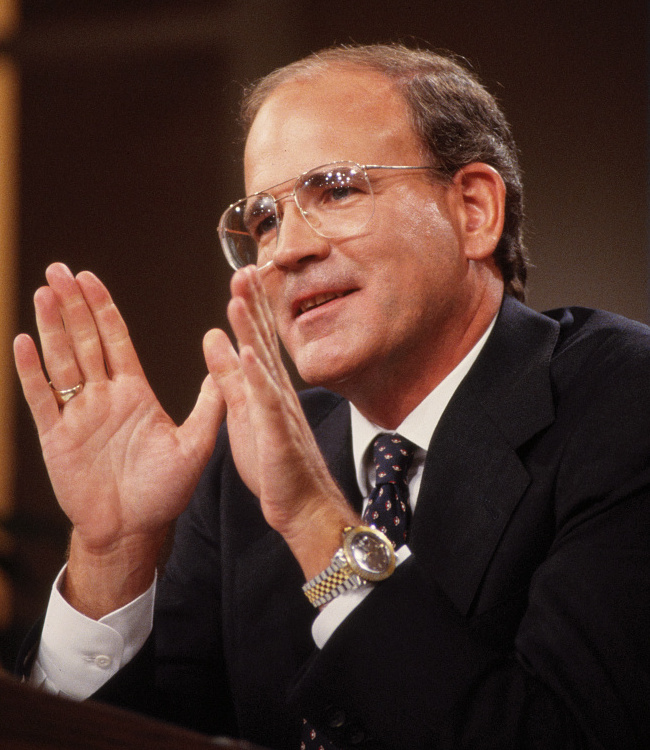
NBC executive Bob Wright was said to hate early prime time and successfully pressured KCRA and KRON to abandon the practice beginning in September 1993.

NBC then began to apply pressure on KRON and KCRA to force them to unwind their early prime time scheduling practices. On July 21, company president Bob Wright told a press event in Los Angeles that he expected KRON to return to traditional prime time. KRON announced the change two weeks later, citing that NBC had concluded the test. McCombs said the station did not want to switch, even after acquiring rights to Oakland Athletics baseball, but did so because Wright apparently hated early prime. KRON's newscast—originally an hour, reduced to 30 minutes within months—had not performed as expected. In the May 1993 Nielsen ratings, it finished first in the time slot—but when the episode after the final airing of Cheers was excluded, it fell from first to last. In response to KRON's decision, KPIX announced it would continue with early prime, with KPIX spokesman Harry Fuller deriding traditional prime time as "dino" time.

Days later, KCRA announced that it would switch back to traditional prime time as part of a three-year affiliation renewal with NBC, again as a result of pressure from the network. While prime time ratings had remained steady, the local newscast had not met station expectations, and KCRA lost between $7 and $12 million in revenue. KCRA's owners, Jon and Robert Kelly, calculated that they could make more money by airing syndicated shows in the access hour than with a full 10 p.m. news hour; however, the station was attracting better ratings than other West Coast NBC affiliates. KCRA announced that it was still interested in airing an early late news program and shopped a 10 p.m. newscast to KRBK, KTXL, and KSCH-TV. KSCH began airing the KCRA-produced newscast on September 12, 1993; this started a relationship between the two stations that culminated in KCRA taking over programming under a local marketing agreement in 1994.

On September 14, 1998, KPIX returned to traditional prime time scheduling. By that time, several key factors had changed. KPIX's owner, Group W, had been acquired by CBS; the station had a new general manager who was less supportive of the practice; and the practice had been "a wash" financially, per CBS executive vice president for research David Poltrack. He noted that the viewers lost in the first hour of prime time were made up for by the stronger performance of The Late Show at 11 p.m., while revenue from the 10 p.m. newscast was offset by losing the 7 p.m. access hour of syndicated programs. Moving prime time back an hour also was beneficial for CBS in ensuring that prime time shows were programmed against their intended competition in the fifth-largest TV market.

== Use at KOVR in Sacramento ==
In 1995, an affiliation switch saw ABC and CBS switch stations in Sacramento. The new CBS affiliate, KOVR, announced that it would adopt early prime time scheduling in conjunction with its new network alliance. At the time, the president of its owner, River City Broadcasting, was Rick Blangiardi. Blangiardi had supported early prime when he was general manager of KING-TV in Seattle, and he had been the general manager of KPIX. At the time, KOVR was undergoing a major shakeup to lift it out of third place in local news ratings; Blangiardi saw early prime as an "opportunity", given his experience with KPIX and its strong ratings for Letterman.

When the CBS network acquired KOVR in 2005, it was speculated that the station would return to traditional prime time; however, CBS ultimately preserved the practice and even expanded it by shifting weekend programming up an hour in 2006. The station continued to use early prime time scheduling as of 2023.
