= ABC 40 =

ABC 40 may refer to one of the following television stations in the United States:

== Current ==
- KHBS in Fort Smith, Arkansas
- KRHD-CD in Bryan–College Station, Texas
- WGGB-TV in Springfield, Massachusetts
- WWSB in Sarasota, Florida

== Former ==
- KCCC-TV in Sacramento, California (1953–1957)
- KDUB-TV (now KFXB-TV) in Dubuque, Iowa (1970–1974 and 1976–1995)
- WAIM-TV/WAXA (now WMYA-TV) in Anderson, South Carolina (1976–1978 and 1991–1995)
- WJSU (now WGWW) in Anniston, Alabama (1996–2014)
  - Was a satellite station of WBMA-LD in Birmingham, Alabama
