= KXTV/KOVR tower =

Communication tower in Walnut Grove, California, US

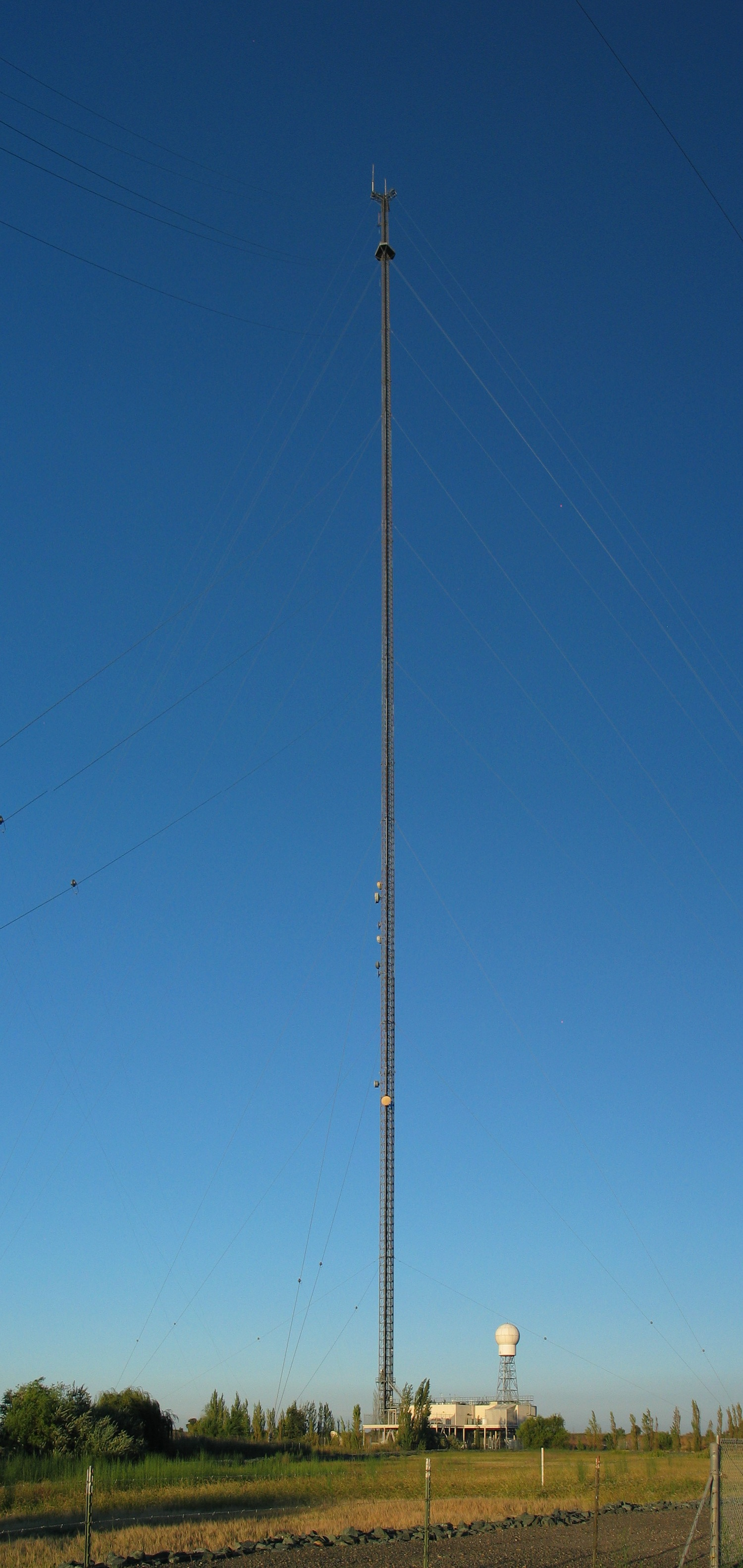
KXTV/KOVR tower; note the Doppler weather radar station to the right

The KXTV Tower (also known as the Sacramento Joint Venture Tower999) is a 2,060-foot-high (630 m) communications tower in Walnut Grove, California, United States.

Built in 1985, it is the tallest structure in California, second-tallest structure in the United States, second-tallest guyed mast in the world, and the eighth-tallest structure to have ever existed.

Omnidirectional antennas on the tower broadcast the over-the-air television (OTA) signal for KXTV-TV channel 10 (virtual and transmit) and KOVR-TV channel 13 (virtual) and 25 (transmit). The geographical coordinates for the site, a low-lying rural area about 23 miles (37 km) south-southwest of Sacramento and 25 miles (40 km) north-northwest of Stockton, are 38°14′23″N 121°30′06″W.

Th KXTV/KOVR Tower, the Channel 40 and KVIE-TV Channel 6 Tower, and the Channel 3-Hearst-Argyle Tower form an antenna farm on the east side of the Sacramento River and west of the Interstate 5 freeway which can be easily seen for miles around in every direction.

The towers provide OTA service to viewers in the Sacramento/Stockton/Modesto designated market area in California's Central Valley.

With their significant height and central location in Walnut Grove, they provide line-of-sight (LOS) signal coverage to the adjacent flat valley terrain for over 60 miles (100 km) to the north (Sacramento) and to the south-southeast (Stockton and Modesto). The towers also provide coverage across the valley to the east into the Sierra Nevada foothills and mountains, and to the west to portions of the eastern San Francisco Bay Area (eastern Solano and Contra Costa counties).

The decommissioned television tower central to the movie Fall was based on this radio tower, according to director Scott Mann.

== Current tenants ==
- KOVR Ch. 13 (analog (former))
- KOVR Ch. 25 (digital)
- KMAX Ch. 21 (digital)
- KXTV Ch. 10 (analog (former))
- KXTV Ch. 10 (digital)
- KTFK Ch. 26 (digital)
