= KVUE (California) =

Television station in Sacramento, California (1959–1960)

- Sacramento, California; United States
- Channels: Analog: 40 (UHF)

Programming
- Affiliations: Independent

Ownership
- Owner: Capitol Television Company

History
- First air date: November 9, 1959
- Last air date: March 18, 1960

Technical information
- ERP: 15.8 kW
- HAAT: 320 ft (98 m)

KVUE was a television station on ultra high frequency (UHF) channel 40 in Sacramento, California, United States. It operated for less than five months, from November 9, 1959, to March 18, 1960. The independent station was founded by employees of the previous channel 40, KCCC-TV, and bore that call sign until it began broadcasting. It was undercapitalized and ran out of money.

== History ==
In March 1958, a group of three employees of KCCC-TV, Sacramento's first television station, which had left the air the year before, filed an application with the Federal Communications Commission (FCC) for a construction permit to build a new television outlet for the city on channel 40. This group, known as the Capitol Television Company, consisted of former KCCC-TV account executive Melvyn Lucas, chief engineer Harry Bartolomei, and announcer Clarence Holten. (Note: KVUE did not inherit KCCC-TV's construction permit or operating history, though even the Broadcasting Yearbook combined the two.) This bid faced competition from a permit for KGMS-TV, associated with Sacramento radio station KGMS; originally authorized for channel 46, the radio station sought to switch to channel 40.

Capitol received the construction permit in November 1958. The new station initially adopted the same KCCC-TV call letters as the previous channel 40, but its launch was delayed multiple times. The launch missed the February 15, 1959, target date. However, even before going on air, there was a recognition that the station's existence would be limited by being on the UHF band, which at the time could not be received on all television sets. In May, the new KCCC-TV unsuccessfully fought for Sacramento to be assigned a fourth very high frequency (VHF) channel, channel 8, by reducing the minimum distance between stations on the same channel. Later, it floated the idea of moving channel 12 from Chico for its use.

In October 1959, the new channel 40 began broadcasting a test pattern. It also underwent a reorganization that brought five new local investors, two business people, and three attorneys on board. The call sign changed to KVUE before commercial programming was to begin on November 1, 1959. The new KVUE was not broadcast from the former KCCC-TV facilities; it had its own tower at 25th and A streets, while studio facilities were in leased quarters at the Women's Building of the California State Fairground. The station's launch was delayed by weather: high winds damaged the tower holding its studio–transmitter link, preventing KVUE from sending a picture to the transmitter and delaying its start until November 9.

Capitol Television lacked the financial resources necessary to keep KVUE going for long. On March 15, 1960, Capitol informed its employees that it had opted to shutter the station due to insufficient capital. Six employees, including the general manager, opted to work unpaid to keep the television station afloat. This continued for three days until the station's last day of broadcasting on March 18, 1960. At the time, interest was cited on behalf of two groups in the Bay Area and a third party on the East Coast in returning channel 40 to service. In the wake of the closure, Capitol pursued possible conversion of channel 40 to a subscription television operation using Zenith Electronics's system.

The KVUE license remained in force, and in January 1963, Melvyn Lucas, who had acquired a controlling interest, filed for a renewal of channel 40's authority to operate. Lucas would face an unexpected obstacle: a new application for a television station from a company known as Camellia City Telecasters. Lucas again asked for authority to use channel 40 for pay television tests, which the FCC denied. In early December 1963, Lucas petitioned to move KVUE to channel 46, freeing up channel 40 for the Camellia City group. The application turned out to be moot. On December 12, 1963, the FCC dismissed the KVUE renewal application for failure to prosecute.

In March 1965, the FCC granted the Camellia City Telecasters application. Another three years transpired before KTXL began broadcasting on October 26, 1968. The KVUE call letters were assigned to a proposed station in Salem, Oregon, before being adopted by a station in Austin, Texas, which began in 1971.
