= Jim Wieder =

American journalist

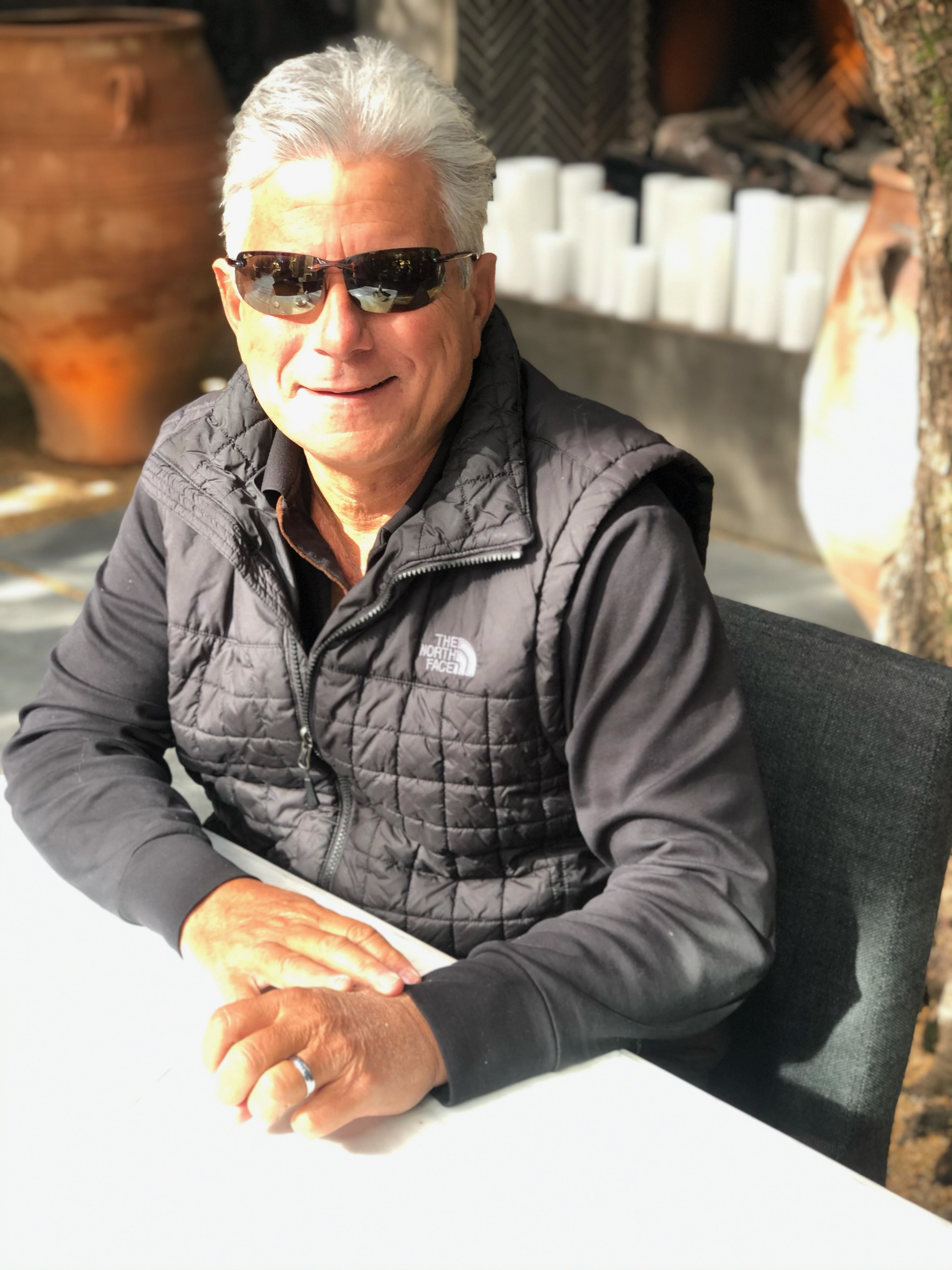
- Jim Wieder in 2021
- Born: New York City
- Occupations: Television anchor; businessperson; chamber of commerce president
- Notable credit(s): Broadcasting; KMST-TV news anchor (1985–1988); KOLD-TV reporter (1988–1990); KOVR-TV anchor/reporter (1990–1996); KGO-TV anchor/reporter (1995–2005); ABC News One (2006–2008) Business owner, Hayward Ace Hardware, 2006–2021 president, Hayward Chamber of Commerce 2008–2010; Chabot College Foundation Board of Directors 2008–2011

Jim Wieder is an American business owner, retired television and radio news anchor, former chamber of commerce executive in the East Bay of Northern California. Currently, Jim is owner of Discount Products 1.

== Broadcasting career ==
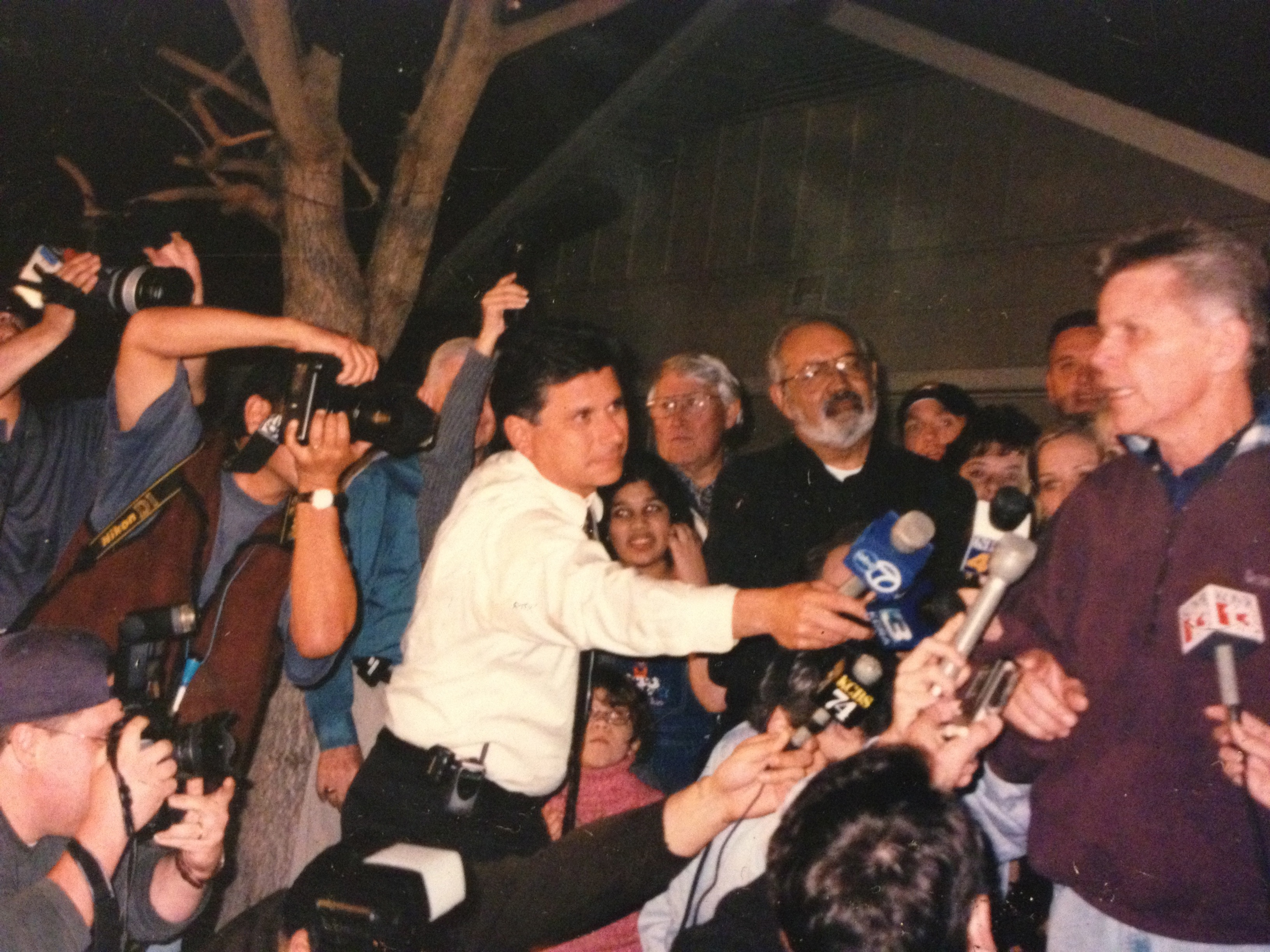
Wieder reporting on the Condit-Levy Scandal (2001)

Wieder, born in Brooklyn, New York is the son of immigrants from Budapest, Hungary. His broadcasting career spanned more than 30-years in Television and Radio. Wieder joined KOVR-TV and KGO-TV & Radio from 1988 until 2005. During that period, Wieder's reporting assignments included the Fall of the Berlin Wall, Loma Prieta Earthquake, numerous Hurricanes including Hurricane Katrina, and conflicts including Operation Desert Storm, and the 9/11 attack. In 2003, Wieder was awarded the Edward Murrow Award of the Overseas Press Club of America for reporting excellence during Operation Iraqi Freedom for his reporting to ABC News Radio.

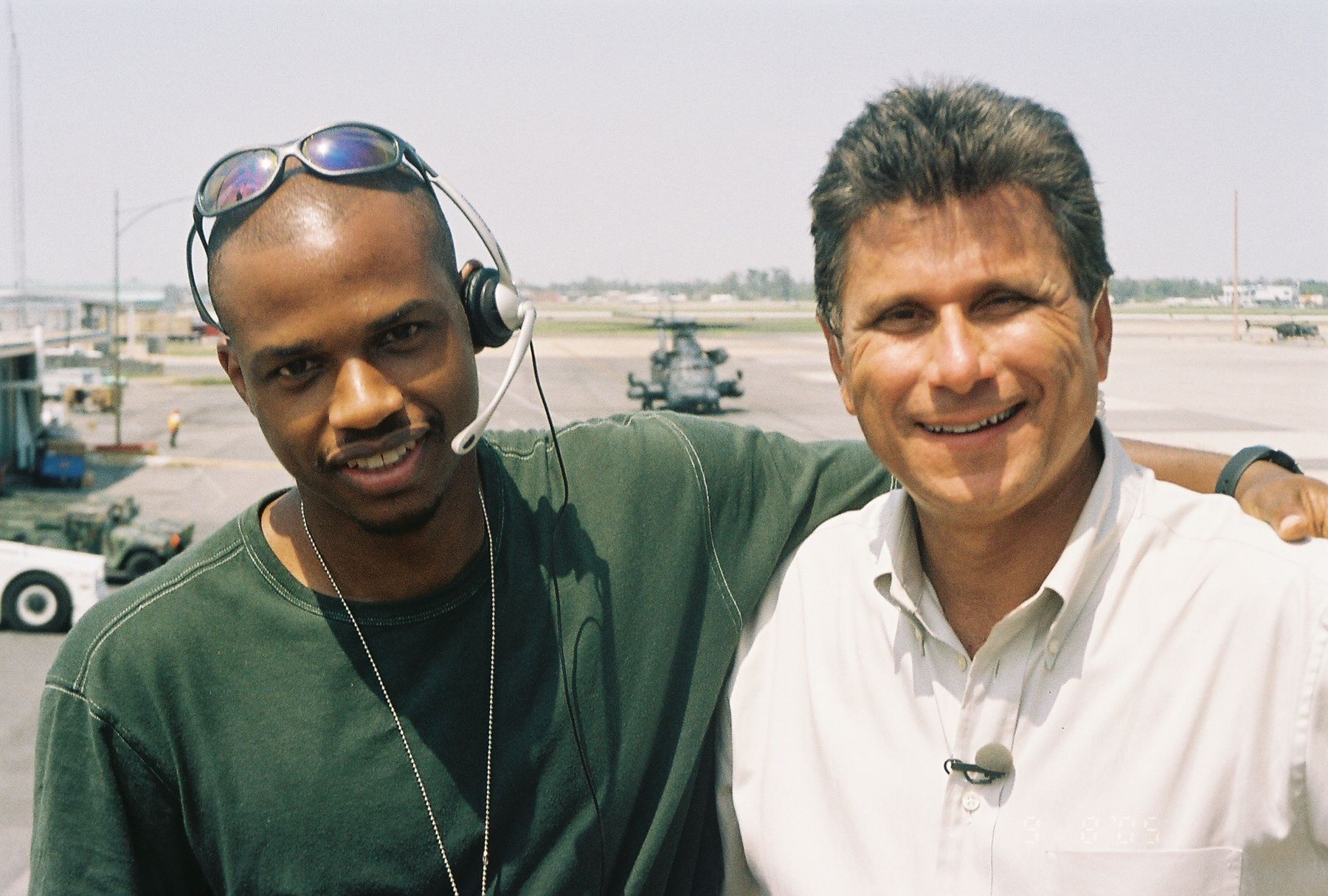
Wieder, with crewmember, during Hurricane Katrina (2005)

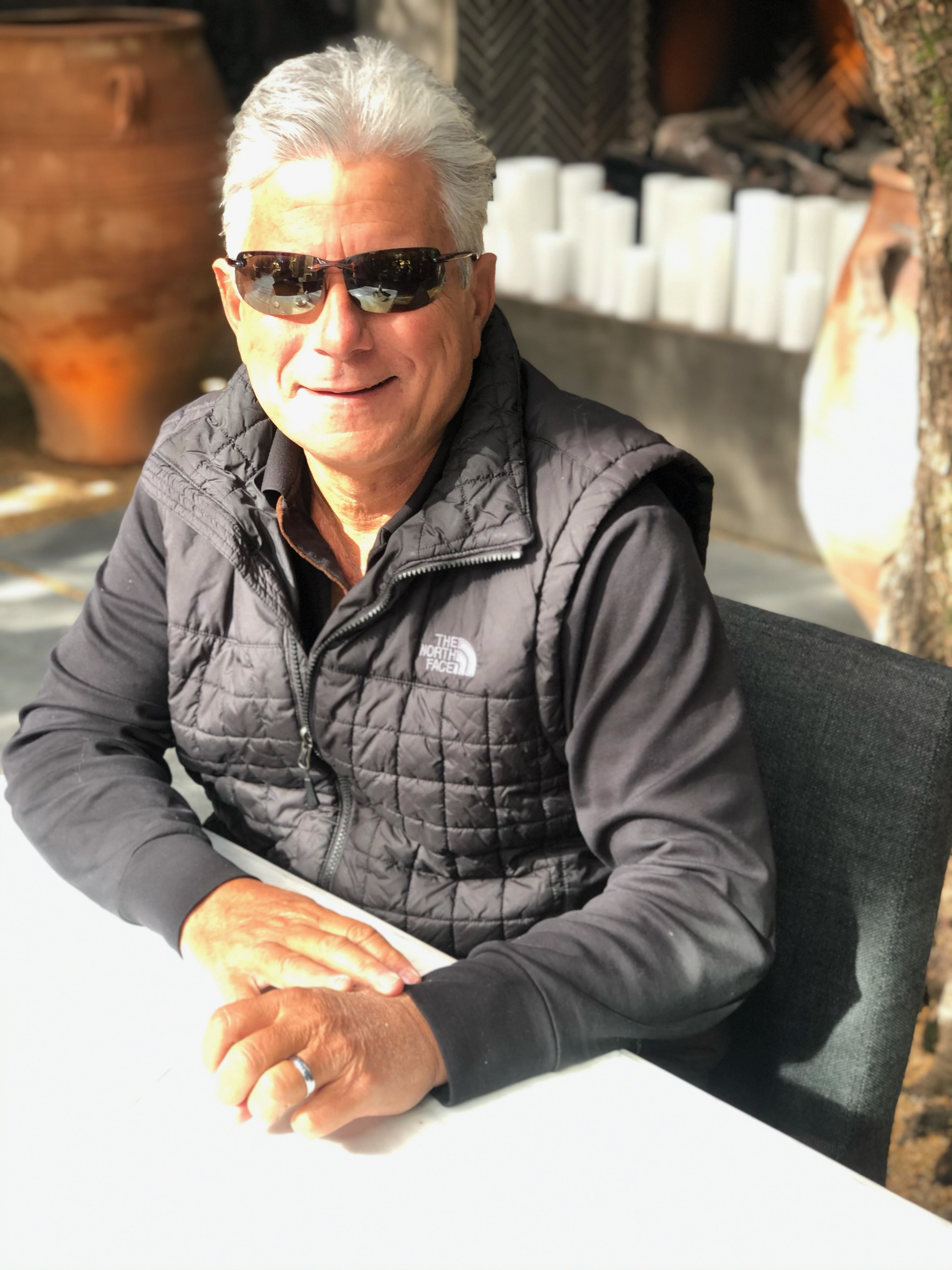
Jim Wieder circa 2021

In 2023 he Co-Hosted Manifesto of a Serial Killer for Oxygen True Crime

== Business career ==
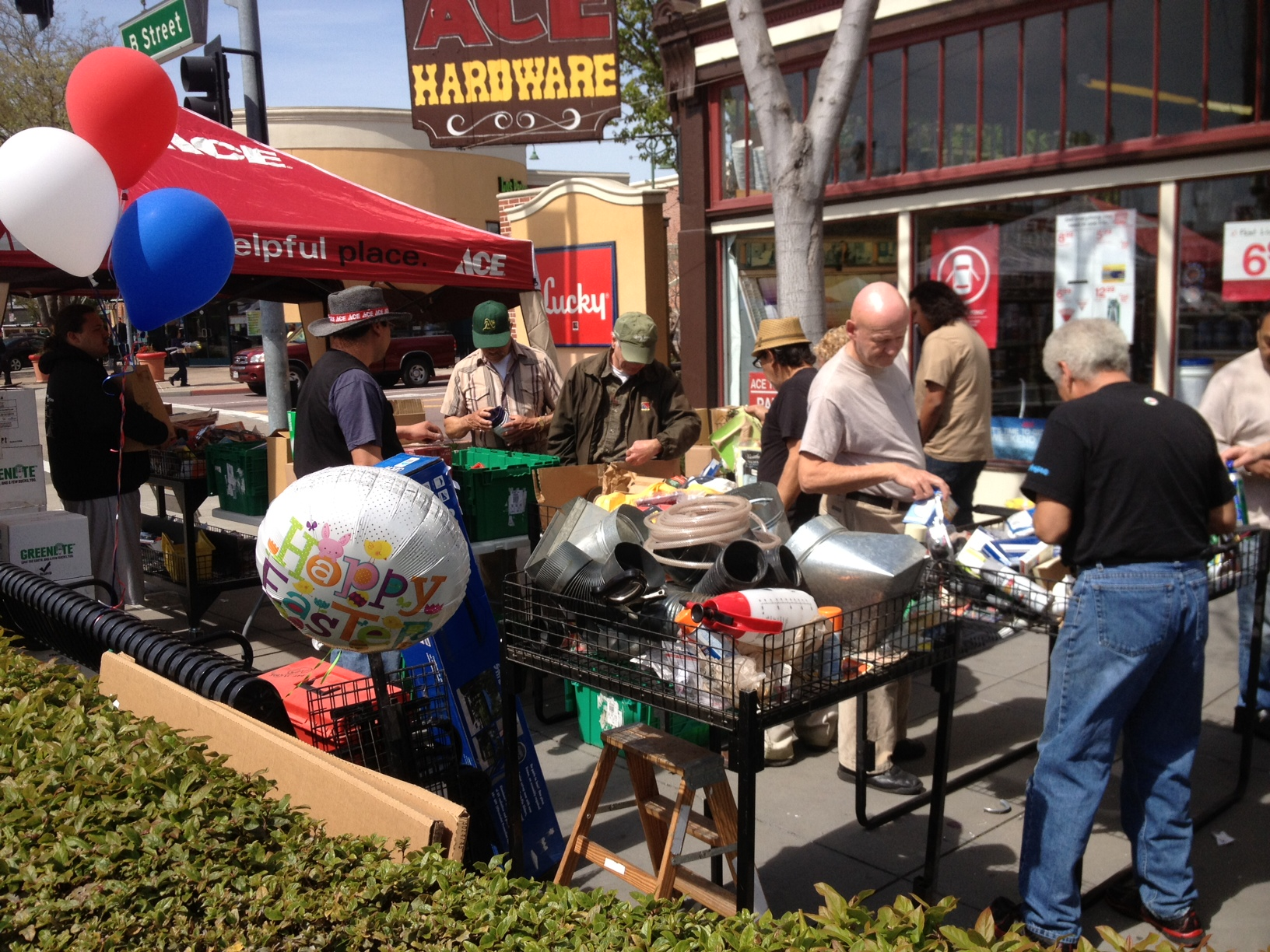
Wieder overseeing a sidewalk sale, Hayward Ace Hardware (2011)

In 2006, Wieder purchased Hayward Ace Hardware after training with the Contra Costa County Small Business Development Council. In 2007, Wieder completed Top Gun ACE retailer training and earned Ace Vision 21 status for superior sales and customer service. In 2008, Hayward Ace earned A+ ratings by several sources including the Better Business Bureau. That same year, Wieder was appointed president and CEO of the Hayward Chamber of Commerce and retained that post until 2010. Wieder was on the Chabot College Foundation Board of Directors from 2008 to 2011. In 2021, Wieder closed Hayward Hardware and started Discount Products 1.
