= KTXL =

Television station in Sacramento, California

- Sacramento, California; United States
- Channels: Digital: 22 (UHF); Virtual: 40
- Branding: Fox40

Programming
- Affiliations: 40.1: Fox; for others, see § Subchannels

Ownership
- Owner: Nexstar Media Group; (Tribune Media Company)
- Sister stations: Tegna: KXTV

History
- First air date: October 26, 1968
- Former channel numbers: Analog: 40 (UHF, 1968–2009); Digital: 55 (UHF, 1999–2009), 40 (UHF, 2009–2020)
- Former affiliations: Independent (1968–1986)
- Call sign meaning: Contains XL, Roman numeral for 40

Technical information
- Licensing authority: FCC
- Facility ID: 10205
- ERP: 1,000 kW
- HAAT: 599 m (1,965 ft)
- Transmitter coordinates: 38°16′18″N 121°30′22″W

Links
- Public license information: Public file; LMS
- Website: fox40.com

KTXL (channel 40) is a television station in Sacramento, California, United States, affiliated with the Fox network. It is owned by Nexstar Media Group, whose Tegna subsidiary owns ABC affiliate KXTV (channel 10). KTXL maintains studios on Fruitridge Road near the Oak Park district on the southern side of Sacramento; its transmitter is located in Walnut Grove, California.

KTXL began broadcasting on October 26, 1968. It was an independent station owned by Camellia City Telecasters, a partnership of Jack Matranga and eventually the Business Men's Assurance Company. It offered syndicated programs, cartoons (including the local host Cap'n Mitch), and sports, as well as movies, amassing one of the largest film libraries for an independent of its size. Cable television signals carried its programming well beyond Sacramento, as far north as Oregon and east to Rapid City, South Dakota. Beginning in 1974, it debuted a 10 p.m. local newscast, the Sacramento market's first. The station survived a challenge to its broadcast license in the 1970s stemming from a forged document it submitted in a case over a competing local station.

KTXL became affiliated with Fox when it launched in 1986, the same year Matranga sold his stake in the station to BMA. Renaissance Communications purchased KTXL in 1988; under its ownership, it was one of the highest-rated Fox affiliates in the country, and the news format was sharpened to make it more compatible with Fox's younger-skewing audience. This continued after Tribune Broadcasting acquired Renaissance in 1996, but the 10 p.m. news remained KTXL's only newscast until it debuted an hour-long morning show in 2005. A flurry of news expansions followed, and by the time Nexstar acquired Tribune in 2019, the station had an extended morning news program and new midday and early evening newscasts. In addition to local news, KTXL produces and partially presents Inside California Politics, a weekly public affairs program aired by all six of Nexstar's California stations.

== Prior history of channel 40 in Sacramento ==
KTXL is the third station to use ultra high frequency (UHF) channel 40 in Sacramento.

Television came to Sacramento on September 30, 1953, when KCCC-TV began telecasting. Based in studios on Garden Highway, it aired programming from all four networks of its day—ABC, CBS, NBC, and the DuMont Television Network. However, as very high frequency (VHF) stations began telecasting in the Sacramento region, it slowly lost most of its network affiliations. CBS affiliated with KBET-TV (channel 10, now KXTV), which began in March 1955, and NBC with KCRA-TV (channel 3), which started six months later. At the same time, DuMont ceased providing network programming. Stockton's KOVR-TV (channel 13) was financially struggling in its attempt to operate as an independent station serving Stockton and San Francisco. In 1956, it filed to move its transmitter to Butte Mountain near Jackson in Amador County, which put it in contention to take the ABC affiliation away from KCCC-TV. This happened six months later, and on May 31, 1957, KCCC-TV ceased broadcasting in what amounted to a partial merger with KOVR. The Stockton station became the ABC affiliate of record for Sacramento.

In 1958, a group of former KCCC-TV employees organized as the Capitol Television Corporation with interest in possibly reviving KCCC-TV. A construction permit was awarded to Capitol in November 1958; while the group initially sought to reclaim the KCCC-TV call sign, the resulting station changed to KVUE shortly before going on the air on November 9, 1959. The undercapitalized independent station folded on March 18, 1960.

== History ==
=== Construction and early years ===
The KVUE license remained in force, but when station president Melvyn Lucas filed for a renewal in January 1963, another local group filed a competing application for its own channel 40 station under the name Camellia City Telecasters. Camellia City was owned by Jack Matranga and three other men; Matranga believed that between the existence of the prior channel 40 and forthcoming regulation, there would be enough sets capable of receiving the proposed station. Due to a failure to put the station back on the air, the Federal Communications Commission (FCC) dismissed the license renewal application for KVUE in December 1963, but it did not grant the Camellia City Telecasters application until March 1965. Though the application was for channel 40, the FCC ordered the station be switched to channel 29 in August 1965, only to revert the change the next year.

In December 1967, the FCC authorized Camellia City Telecasters to sell a majority stake to Community Cablecasting Corporation, and KTXL announced its construction plans. For studios, the station leased a warehouse at 10th and B streets; the transmitter facility would be at Locke, 1 mile (1.6 km) north of the main Sacramento TV station tower at Walnut Grove. KTXL began broadcasting on October 26, 1968, with a lineup of children's programs, movies, and sports. It also aired NBC and CBS programming not cleared by the local affiliates. As the only independent station in the Sacramento market, it aired sports telecasts that in some cases aired on competing stations in the San Francisco area.

KTXL built a new studio facility on Fruitridge Road in 1969. Later that year, 20 percent of the station was sold to the Business Men's Assurance Company (BMA), an insurer based in Kansas City, Missouri. Matranga later recalled that BMA was an "angel" at a time when KTXL's finances were "very dismal". BMA became the 65-percent owner two years later.

In its early years, KTXL offered a variety of non-news local programming. After two years at Modesto's KLOC-TV, children's host Cap'n Mitch (real name Mitch Agruss) joined the channel 40 lineup in 1968. Two years later, Bob Wilkins, who had hosted horror movies at KCRA-TV, moved to KTXL to present the Bob Wilkins Horror Show, which ran until 1981. Cap'n Mitch remained on the air at channel 40 until January 1984, when the station eased him out of on-air duties out of a belief that it no longer needed a host for children's programming and in response to declining viewership.

In addition to the Sacramento area, KTXL was available on cable television systems in parts of California, Nevada, Oregon, Utah, and Washington state. In 1970, it was added to the cable system serving Reno; Matranga noted that the addition helped Sacramento firms that had stores in Reno. In 1973, Matranga initiated all-night programming in an attempt to entice more cable systems to put KTXL on their lineups. Two years later, Community Television of Utah began offering KTXL, alongside KTVU and KWGN-TV of Denver, to its subscribers on the first cable TV system in Salt Lake City. The next year, KTXL's all-night movies began being seen by cable subscribers in Rapid City, South Dakota, some 1,000 miles (1,600 km) from Sacramento. Some KTXL programming was included on the Pacific Teletronics microwave channel that also included material from Bay Area independents KTVU, KICU-TV, and KBHK and was distributed to cable systems in Oregon. By 1980, most Bay Area cable systems included KTXL in their lineups.

An attempt by Camellia City Telecasters to contest the arrival of a second independent station in Sacramento placed KTXL's broadcast license in legal jeopardy. KTXL attempted to show to the FCC that Grayson Television, the owner of the then-proposed KMUV-TV (channel 31), was unqualified to be a broadcast licensee. Camellia City Telecasters submitted a pleading containing what purported to be a telex message from Dun & Bradstreet. The alleged telex claimed that Sidney Grayson was the president of Grayson Television, even though he had previously been convicted of income tax evasion. In actuality, Grayson was not a corporate officer but a general manager. In August 1974, the FCC opened a hearing into charges the teletype was forged. In 1975, Grayson Television sued Camellia City for $7.5 million (equivalent to $33.9 million in 2025 dollars), claiming the filing was an attempt to prevent KMUV-TV from being constructed. The next year, an administrative law judge issued an initial decision finding against KTXL and recommended its license not be renewed. Shortly after, KMUV won $150,000 (equivalent to $564,547 in 2025 dollars) in a settlement with Camellia City. The FCC voted in June 1978 to overturn the recommendation and renew the KTXL license. Having survived the license challenge, KTXL constructed an addition to its studios in 1980 that nearly doubled their size from 13,000 square feet (1,200 m^{2}) to 25,000 square feet (2,300 m^{2}).

Matranga gained a reputation as a large-scale buyer of movies and syndicated programming. By 1981, KTXL had a film library of 5,000 titles, double what independent stations in comparably sized markets carried, and Matranga was continuing to buy as prices rose, locking in market exclusivity for years to many films. Koplar Communications, owner of channel 31 (by this time KRBK-TV), sued KTXL in 1982, arguing that its spending on hoarding programming inventory was monopolistic and served to starve KRBK of programming. In 1985, KTXL built a new, 2,000-foot (610 m) tower in Walnut Grove, and the next year, it affiliated with the new Fox network. In 1988, Fox added America's Most Wanted to its Sunday night lineup after it outperformed the existing program in the time slot, Werewolf, in a test run conducted on KTXL.

=== Renaissance and Tribune ownership ===
Matranga and BMA were partners in starting two new independent stations in the western United States. In 1983, the companies partnered to launch KDVR in Denver and KPDX in Vancouver, Washington, serving Portland, Oregon. In 1985, all three stations were put up for sale, primarily because BMA wished to sell in a healthy market for TV stations. No sale eventuated, but in November 1986, Matranga agreed to exchange the remainder of his stake in KTXL for full ownership of KPDX. In acquiring full ownership of KDVR and KTXL, BMA intended to sell both stations later and moved to do so in 1988. KTXL was purchased that December for $56 million (equivalent to $128 million in 2025 dollars) by Renaissance Communications. Under Renaissance, KTXL became one of the highest-rated Fox affiliates in the United States, with strong ratings among younger audiences for Fox programming fueling increased advertising revenues. On July 1, 1996, Chicago-based Tribune Broadcasting announced that it would acquire Renaissance Communications for $1.13 billion (equivalent to $2.08 billion in 2025 dollars).

=== Sinclair and Fox purchase attempts; sale to Nexstar ===
Sinclair Broadcast Group announced their purchase of Tribune Media on May 8, 2017, for $3.9 billion and the assumption of $2.7 billion in Tribune-held debt. Sinclair—which previously owned KOVR until selling it to CBS Television Stations in 2005—opted to sell KTXL to Fox Television Stations as one of 23 stations to be divested in order to obtain regulatory approval. The resale to Fox was later amended to be part of a $910 million (equivalent to $1.12 billion in 2025 dollars) deal. Tribune Media terminated the merger on August 9, 2018, and filed a breach of contract lawsuit, nullifying both transactions outright; these actions came after FCC lead commissioner Ajit Pai publicly rejected the merger and the commission voted to have the deal subject to review.

Nexstar Media Group and Tribune Media agreed to an acquisition on December 3, 2018, for $6.4 billion (equivalent to $7.85 billion in 2025 dollars) in cash and debt. The merger closed on September 19, 2019.

Nexstar acquired KXTV owner Tegna in a deal announced in August 2025 and completed on March 19, 2026. A temporary restraining order issued one week later by the U.S. District Court for the Eastern District of California, later escalated to a preliminary injunction, has prevented Nexstar from integrating the stations.

== News operation ==
=== Starting at 10 p.m. ===
On September 16, 1974, KTXL debuted the 10 O'Clock News, a half-hour 10 p.m. newscast that was the first to air in that time slot in Sacramento. In January 1977, the newscast was lengthened to a full hour as the station hired two new anchors: Bob Whitten, formerly of KCRA-TV, and Larry Camp. The program was reformatted in August 1979 as NewsPlus, featuring a living room–based news set, live interviews and call-in segments. It also featured new anchors, Pat McConahay and Pete Wilson. The format was modeled after The MacNeil/Lehrer Report. Wilson's departure for San Francisco in 1983 led to a switch to a co-anchor format and a more traditional desk-based set. In early 1985, the station overhauled its news programming. It cut the 10 p.m. local news to 30 minutes, added Independent Network News for national news at 10:30 p.m., and introduced a similarly formatted midday hour at 11 a.m. amid rumors of a sale. The latter lasted only until October.

In spite of having cut back, KTXL soon took a more aggressive tack to news, in part prodded by the relaunch of a 10 p.m. newscast at channel 31. In 1986, it bought a satellite news-gathering truck and joined the Conus Communications satellite network. The truck was promoted in a series of commercials featuring comedic actor Leslie Nielsen. Andy Asher, who had succeeded Wilson as anchor, was dismissed in August and replaced with former KOVR sports director Ted Mullins. With the additional resources of Conus and CNN, the station lengthened its news back to an hour in April 1987. While anchoring on April 11, 1990, Mullins felt chest pains. It was his last newscast; he suffered the first of three heart attacks later that night and died two days later. KTXL moved sports director Jim Crandell to news as the replacement for Mullins.

While KRBK-TV moved its 10 p.m. newscast to 9 p.m. in 1989 to avoid competition with KTXL, competition increased in the 10 p.m. news market in the 1990s. As part of its early prime time experiment, KCRA-TV aired a 10 p.m. newscast from 1991 to 1993, when it was moved to KSCH (channel 58, now KQCA). To counterprogram the second half of KCRA's newscast after it was extended to an hour, KTXL did the opposite and switched to a 30-minute report in September 1992. KCRA beat KTXL handily when the newscasts went head-to-head, but after the end of early prime, KTXL again had the top-rated 10 p.m. newscast in the market.

Michael Burke arrived as news director in 1993 from KHTV in Houston. Building on the young-skewing Fox audience, Burke sought to increase the pace of KTXL's newscast to match and attract viewers that normally would not consider a newscast. The anchor team was shuffled, with Crandell moved back to sports. As competition increased with KRBK switching back to a 10 p.m. news hour in 1994 and KOVR moving its late news to 10 p.m. upon switching to CBS in 1995, KTXL invested in an improved anchor team and new cameras. However, KOVR quickly surpassed KTXL in 10 p.m. news ratings. The half-hour newscast was extended back to an hour in 1995, initially as a separate half-hour to provide in-depth coverage of the murder trial of O. J. Simpson. but later as a full hour-long program. Burke continued to run the KTXL newsroom until he died of kidney cancer in 1998.

=== Expanding throughout the day ===
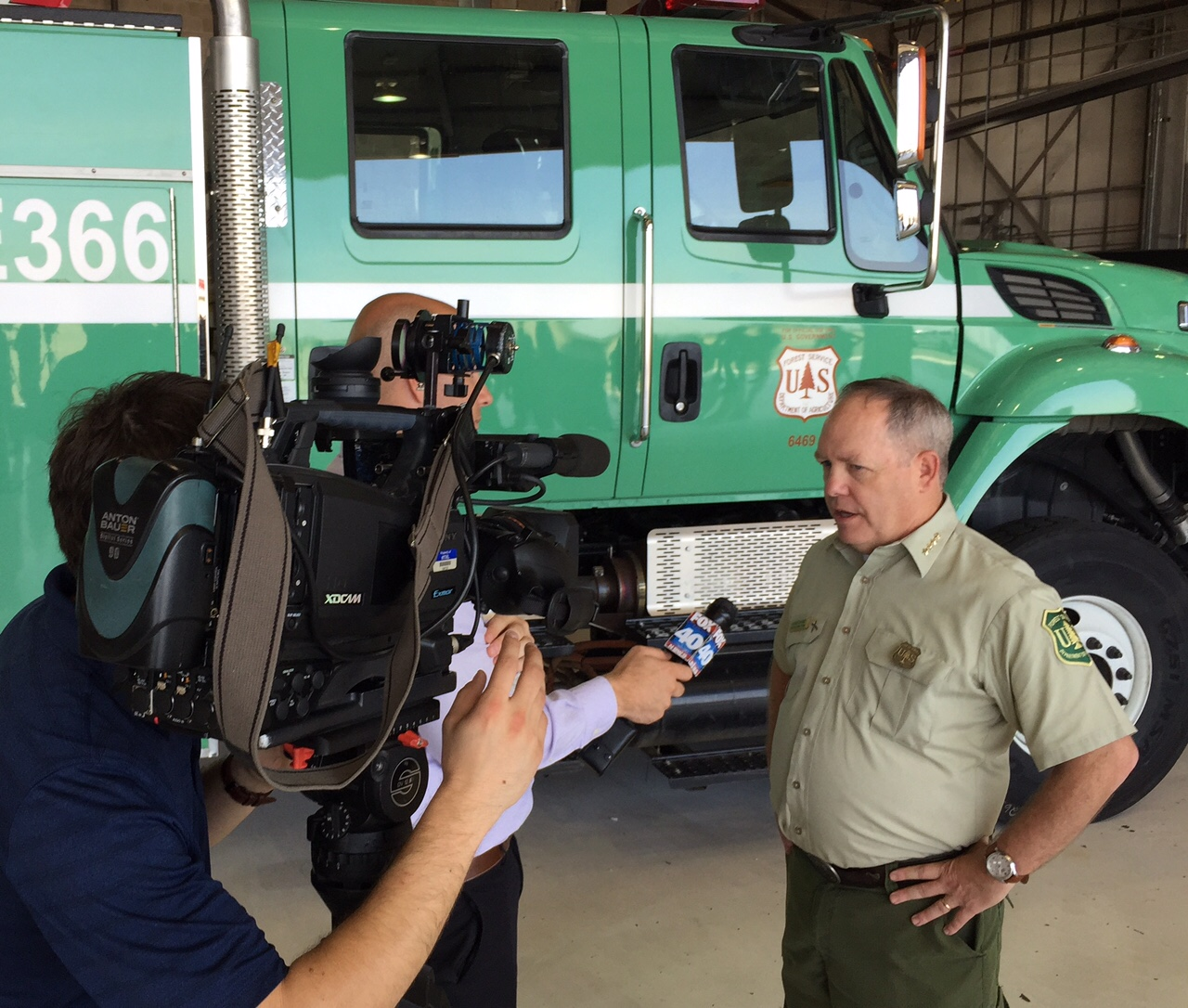
A KTXL reporter and photographer conduct an interview in 2015

Despite strong ratings among younger audiences, where KTXL was more competitive with KOVR than among total viewers, as late as 2000 KTXL had no plans to expand its news department beyond the 10 p.m. news hour. This changed when KTXL launched Fox40 Morning News from 7 to 8 a.m. on June 6, 2005. Its primary competition was Good Day Sacramento, which had aired on channel 31 since 1995. In January 2007, the morning newscast grew to two hours from 6 to 8 a.m. It was relaunched on September 8, 2008, as Fox40 Live with former Sacramento radio personality Paul Robins as a co-anchor and an extended length from 4:30 to 9 a.m. The program had been extended to 10 a.m. by 2012.

Between 2009 and 2023, KTXL went from having no newscasts in the early evening to airing news from 4 to 8 p.m. First to debut was a 5:30 p.m. newscast, alongside a midday newscast at 11 a.m., in September 2009. A 6 p.m. half-hour was added in January 2012, followed by a 5 p.m. half-hour in November 2013. A 7 p.m. hour debuted in December 2019, and a 4 p.m. newscast debuted in 2023.

KTXL launched Inside California Politics, a public affairs program focusing on statewide political issues, in February 2020. Co-hosted by KTXL's Nikki Laurenzo and KTLA's Frank Buckley, the program began to air on the other Nexstar stations in California seven months later.

=== Notable former on-air staff ===
- Michelle Franzen – reporter, 1996–1998
- Adam Housley – reporter, 1999–2001
- Gary Radnich – sports anchor, 1981–1982

== Technical information ==
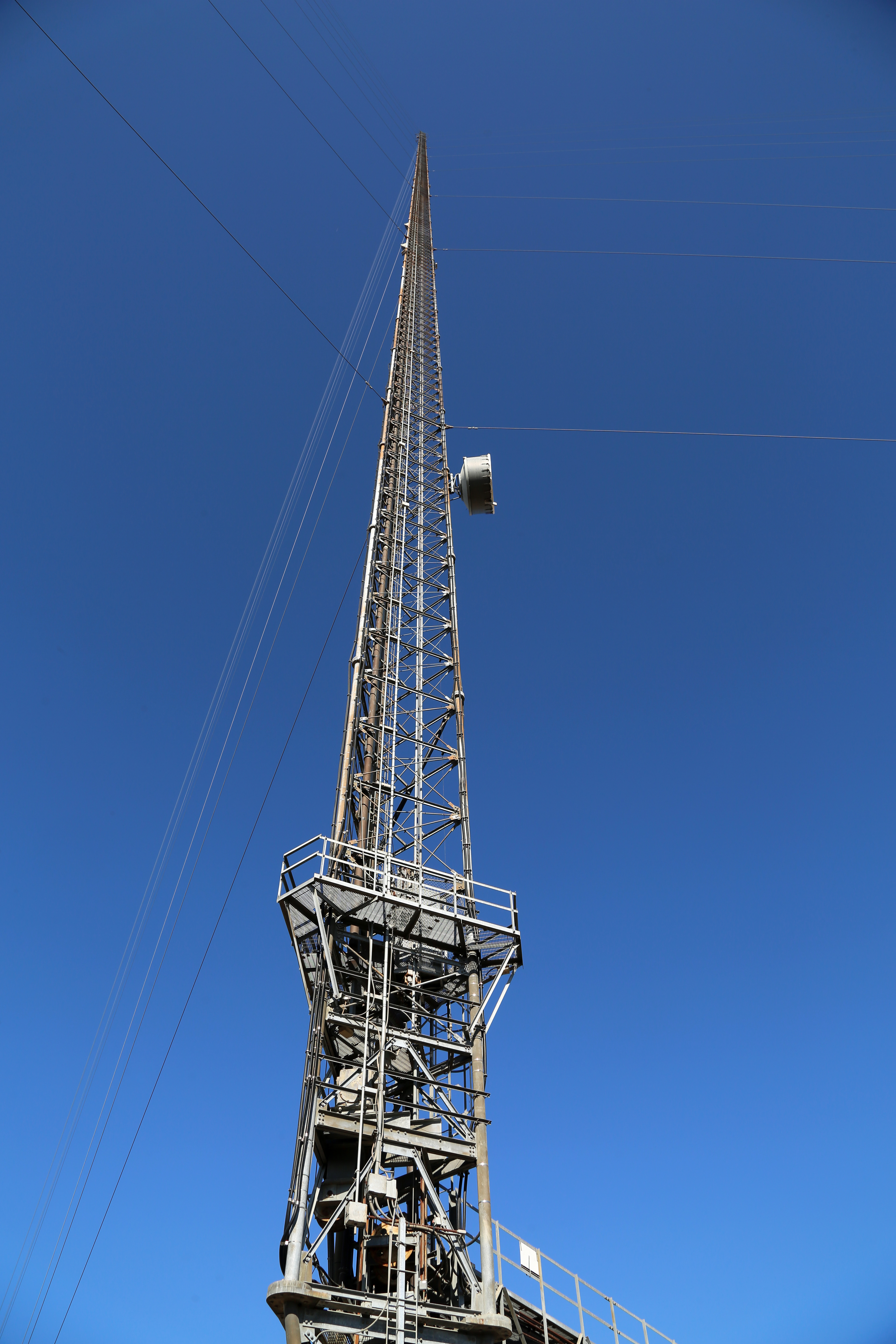
A view from the base of the KTXL tower in Walnut Grove, California

=== Subchannels ===
KTXL's transmitter is located in Walnut Grove, California. The station's signal is multiplexed:

Subchannels of KTXL
Subchannel	Res.	Short name	Programming
40.1	720p	KTXL-TV	Fox
40.2	480i	Ant TV	Antenna TV
40.3	480i	GRIT TV	Grit
40.4	480i	ROAR TV	Roar

=== Analog-to-digital conversion ===
KTXL began broadcasting a digital signal on November 1, 1999, operating on channel 55. KTXL shut down its analog signal, over UHF channel 40, on June 12, 2009, as part of the federally mandated transition from analog to digital television. Its digital signal moved to channel 40 after the transition and moved to channel 22 on April 29, 2020, as a result of the 2016 United States wireless spectrum auction.
