= KCCC-TV =

Television station in Sacramento, California (1953–1957)

- Sacramento, California; United States
- Channels: Analog: 40 (UHF)

Programming
- Affiliations: CBS (1953–1955); NBC (1953–1955); ABC (1953–1957)

Ownership
- Owner: Capital City TV Corporation

History
- First air date: September 30, 1953
- Last air date: May 31, 1957

Technical information
- ERP: 182 kW
- HAAT: 480 m (1,575 ft)
- Transmitter coordinates: 38°36′35″N 121°33′15″W

KCCC-TV (channel 40) was a television station in Sacramento, California, United States. Owned by the Capital City TV Corporation, KCCC-TV was Sacramento's first television outlet and broadcast from 1953 to 1957. However, the arrival of new very high frequency (VHF) stations, which unlike ultra high frequency (UHF) outlets did not require special converters to tune on most television sets, limited the station's reach and programming. The station's demise was caused when Stockton's KOVR (channel 13) obtained the ABC affiliation by moving its transmitter; KCCC-TV's ownership then purchased a stake in KOVR and shut down channel 40.

== History ==
=== Establishment ===
In 1952, the Federal Communications Commission (FCC) lifted a four-year freeze on television station applications and made available 70 new channels in the ultra high frequency (UHF) band for television use. Two applications were received specifying channel 40 in Sacramento, from Maria Helen Alvarez—part-owner of KOTV in Tulsa, Oklahoma—and Sacramento Broadcasters, owner of station KXOA (1470 AM). However, Sacramento Broadcasters decided to return to the competition for VHF channel 3 instead. Another firm—the KAA-TV Corporation (changed to Cal Tel Corporation), backed by Ashley L. Robison and Frank Hurd—applied in October. The Alvarez and Cal Tel applications languished until Alvarez withdrew her proposal on July 1, 1953, because of new FCC rules limiting owners to five stations; she had applied for a total of six. After Cal Tel reimbursed her for $35,000 in expenses, an FCC hearing examiner recommended the award.

Cal Tel had already leased the basement of the Sacramento Chamber of Commerce building for studios. However, plans changed over the course of the first half of 1953. With Sacramento businessman and liquor distributor Harry W. McCart, Robison and Hurd formed the Capital City TV Corporation, which broke ground on August 27 on studio facilities on Garden Highway in Sacramento. The group promised to have a test pattern on the air within a month, but construction delays caused by soil conditions on the site set the project back. While the station debuted in time to carry Game 1 of the 1953 World Series on September 30, the first day's telecasting was affected by a strike because the new station was not employing workers from several unions; projectionists refused to cross a two-man picket line. The dispute was cleared up the next day with the telecast of a local commercial program.

=== Operation ===
When the station went on, its studios were not completed, but KCCC-TV's offices and facilities for the first local programs were in the Hotel Senator downtown. An affiliate of CBS, as Sacramento's first TV station, it aired programs from all four networks of the day (CBS, NBC, ABC, and DuMont). Gradually, the Garden Highway facility was expanded: two studios, an art department, a photo lab, and a studio with drive-in space to display cars were all added between September 1953 and mid-1955.

In March 1955, Sacramento's second television station began broadcasting, VHF outlet KBET-TV (channel 10), but KCCC-TV continued to enjoy network service from NBC and ABC, as well as a series of new local programs. However, actions taken by the station underscored the fact that its future was in question. That April, KCCC-TV proposed the deintermixture of Sacramento by either allowing it to move to channel 6 or replacing the VHF channels with UHF channels 34 and 58. 1955 also saw the station investigate the potential of adding a second transmitter in areas south of Sacramento. It first applied for channel 16 in Pittsburg in Contra Costa County, and it also attempted to buy KTVU (channel 36) in Stockton, an NBC affiliate that folded for economic reasons in April 1955. However, the transaction never took place, and it resulted in a lawsuit the next year between buyer and seller.

=== KOVR tower relocation fight and merger ===
After KCRA-TV (channel 3) signed on as an NBC affiliate in September 1955, KCCC-TV was left with only ABC programs. While there was not a third commercial VHF allocation for Sacramento, Stockton had a VHF station: KOVR (channel 13). KOVR had begun broadcasting in 1953 as an independent station transmitting from Mount Diablo. This location gave it a coverage area that included Stockton and San Francisco, which in turn raised its prices for syndicated programming and effectively blocked it from obtaining a network affiliation. In August 1956, KOVR took KCCC-TV by surprise when it announced it filed with the FCC to relocate its transmitter to Butte Mountain near Jackson in Amador County, a move that—by taking its signal out of San Francisco—would put KOVR in position to take the ABC affiliation for the Sacramento–Stockton area away from KCCC-TV.

Two weeks later, Sacramento Broadcasters—having lost in its pursuit of channel 3—announced its purchase of KCCC-TV. The Sacramento Bee noted that its president, Lincoln Dellar, had "been assured of a long-range continuing affiliation with NBC". The sale was approved in October. After the FCC approved the KOVR move to Butte Mountain in November 1956, KCCC-TV management appealed, protesting the decision as a Stockton station encroaching on the Sacramento market. As a result, the FCC stayed its grant of the construction permit in January 1957.

However, KOVR's claims that it had been assured affiliation by ABC proved correct. In February 1957, KOVR announced that it had been signed as an ABC affiliate beginning February 17, once again blindsiding KCCC-TV, which had been told by the network that no such negotiation would take place until the Butte Mountain move was approved. This action marked the beginning of the end. In April, KCCC-TV withdrew its opposition to KOVR's relocation, with the FCC granting the application. That news sparked rumors. On May 1, the news that management would decline to confirm rumors that KCCC-TV would fold at month's end made the front page of The Bee.

That rumor turned out to be true. On May 31, 1957, KCCC-TV ceased broadcasting in what amounted to a partial merger with KOVR. The Stockton station became the ABC affiliate of record for Sacramento—already simulcasting many ABC programs with channel 40—as KCCC-TV owner Lincoln Dellar purchased stock in Television Diablo. In the merger, KOVR acquired the KCCC-TV studios in Sacramento, which it reopened the next year and made available to new educational station KVIE. The small facility was later replaced as KOVR's Sacramento facility by a converted bakery.

== Later use of channel 40 ==
In 1958, a group of employees formed with interest in possibly reviving KCCC-TV. The Capitol Television Corporation consisted of former KCCC-TV account executive Melvyn Lucas, chief engineer Harry Bartolomei, and announcer Clarence Holten. This bid faced competition from a permit for KGMS-TV, associated with Sacramento radio station KGMS; originally authorized for channel 46, the radio station sought to switch to channel 40. A construction permit was awarded to Capitol in November 1958; while the group initially sought to reclaim the KCCC-TV call sign, the resulting station changed to KVUE shortly before going on the air on November 9, 1959. The undercapitalized independent station folded on March 18, 1960.

The KVUE license remained in force, but when Lucas filed for a renewal in January 1963, another local group filed a competing application for its own channel 40 station under the name Camellia City Telecasters. Due to a failure to put the station back on the air, the license renewal application for KVUE was dismissed in December 1963, but the FCC did not grant the Camellia City Telecasters application until March 1965. Another three years transpired before KTXL began broadcasting on October 26, 1968.

KVIE continued to occupy the Garden Highway facility built by KCCC-TV for decades. By the mid-1980s, however, it was in inadequate condition with power and water issues; KVIE had grown to the point where the temporary structure was "bursting at the seams" and was renting additional office space to house its staff. The station relocated to a new building in Natomas in 1990.
