= KXTV =

Television station in Sacramento, California

- Sacramento–Stockton–Modesto, California; United States
- City: Sacramento, California
- Channels: Digital: 10 (VHF); Virtual: 10
- Branding: ABC 10; ABC 10 News

Programming
- Affiliations: 10.1: ABC; for others, see § Technical information and subchannels

Ownership
- Owner: Tegna Inc., a subsidiary of Nexstar Media Group; (KXTV, LLC)
- Sister stations: Nexstar: KTXL

History
- First air date: March 20, 1955
- Former call signs: KBET-TV (1955–1959)
- Former channel numbers: Analog: 10 (VHF, 1955–2009); Digital: 61 (UHF, 1999–2009)
- Former affiliations: CBS (1955–1995)
- Call sign meaning: X represents the number 10 in Roman numerals

Technical information
- Licensing authority: FCC
- Facility ID: 25048
- ERP: 28.6 kW
- HAAT: 611.9 m (2,008 ft)
- Transmitter coordinates: 38°14′24″N 121°30′7″W
- Translator(s): 36 (UHF) Sacramento

Links
- Public license information: Public file; LMS
- Website: www.abc10.com

KXTV (channel 10) is a television station in Sacramento, California, United States, affiliated with ABC. It is owned by the Tegna subsidiary of Nexstar Media Group; Nexstar also owns Fox affiliate KTXL (channel 40). KXTV's studios are located on Broadway, just south of US 50 at the south edge of downtown Sacramento, and its transmitter is located in Walnut Grove, California.

KXTV was the second station built in Sacramento proper, signing on in 1955; it served as Sacramento's CBS affiliate for four decades before changing to ABC in 1995. Its early history was dominated by a battle between local newspaper interests and a group of non-broadcasting business owners for the right to operate the channel, which was won by the latter. Owned in turn by Corinthian Broadcasting and Belo before being acquired by Tegna's forerunner Gannett in 1999, the station slowly rose to second place in local news ratings before falling back to third in the late 2000s. In 2026, Tegna was acquired by Nexstar, already owner of KTXL in Sacramento.

== History ==
=== A long channel 10 battle ===
The first application for channel 10 in Sacramento was filed on May 7, 1948, by the McClatchy Broadcasting Company, owner of The Sacramento Bee newspaper and radio stations KFBK and KFBK-FM. The application was put on hold during the Federal Communications Commission (FCC)'s four-year freeze on television licenses; when the freeze ended, McClatchy refiled for channel 10. By October, the FCC had received eight applications for Sacramento's various TV channels, and joining McClatchy in seeking channel 10 was a consortium known as Sacramento Telecasters, Inc. Sacramento Telecasters consisted of mostly private business interests outside of broadcasting. One owner was Robert S. Breuner of the Breuners Home Furnishings chain; his store had sold televisions when San Francisco stations went on the air, only to have many of them returned because San Francisco stations were not sufficiently received in Sacramento. Also present in the consortium was John Schacht, general manager of radio station KMOD in Modesto, California.

The battle between McClatchy and Sacramento Telecasters that ensued was a long and comparatively high-profile hearing. Both groups originally proposed to build a transmitter facility at Pine Hill, 29 miles (47 km) east of Sacramento in the foothills of the Sierra Nevada. However, the site was owned by the state, and the California Department of Forestry had announced it would only permit one mast to be built at Pine Hill. Where McClatchy expressed concern over the lack of broadcast expertise in most of the ownership, KMOD's public service record, and the possibility that the economic interests involved in Sacramento Telecasters might withdraw their advertising from other stations, Sacramento Telecasters contended that McClatchy—with its ownership of newspapers and broadcasting properties covering areas from Bakersfield in the south to Red Bluff in the north—was overly dominant in the region. Each group had selected a site for planned studios: McClatchy would build television facilities next to the new building for The Bee at 22nd and Q streets, while Sacramento Telecasters announced it would construct at 30th and L streets.

FCC hearing examiner Thomas Donahue issued his recommendation on November 10, 1953. He found in favor of McClatchy, citing its long record in broadcasting including five years of training personnel in television, though noting that both applications were unobjectionable. Sacramento Telecasters immediately objected to the initial decision, with president William P. Wright telling the Associated Press, "The men in Sacramento Telecasters believe that all seven members of the FCC are entitled to rule on this apparent departure which would prevent any possibility of new blood entering the field of communications, regardless of qualifications." The next month, the firm filed a 55-page objection and 113 pages of supporting briefs urging the commission to overturn the initial decision, its argument hinging on the question of diversification of media ownership. Sacramento Telecasters received a lift when the FCC's broadcast bureau recommended its application over that of McClatchy in April 1955. Its lead attorney, P. W. Valicenti, called the Sacramento Valley "McClatchy land"; McClatchy attorneys countered this characterization, highlighting the presence of 28 non-McClatchy daily newspapers and several other radio stations in town.

On October 4, 1954, the FCC unanimously overturned the initial decision and granted a construction permit to Sacramento Telecasters, which it deemed a newcomer that "warrants a substantial preference" over McClatchy despite the latter's public service record with its existing stations. The company then announced it would begin construction on its proposed new station. McClatchy announced it would challenge the decision in federal appeals court, but Telecasters announced it would go ahead with building the station. It did, however, make two modifications to its plans; site availability concerns surrounding Pine Hill led to its replacement with a new site at Logtown, south of El Dorado, and the studios would be built on 7th Avenue. The facility, formerly the headquarters of the California Highway Patrol, was partially rebuilt to house two studios and eight offices.

On March 20, 1955, KBET-TV—promoted as "Your Best Bet in TV"—began broadcasting with an opening program headlined by comedian Johnny Carson and its first night of programs from CBS; it was Sacramento's second station and the city's first VHF outlet, preceded by KCCC-TV (channel 40). However, for nearly three years after broadcasting began, the station's fledgling operation continued to be challenged by McClatchy. In addition to continuing to argue that the FCC was unfair to newspapers in denying its application and looked upon them with a "jaundiced eye", an argument unanimously rejected by a three-man panel, the newspaper company added a new argument related to Telecasters's decision to change the transmitter site from Pine Hill to Logtown, which reduced the station's coverage area and was a downgrade from the original proposals for both companies. McClatchy found more success in this line of argument; in October 1956, the appeals court ordered the commission to hold hearings on the KBET-TV tower site change. After the Supreme Court of the United States refused to hear appeals from McClatchy and from Sacramento Telecasters, a hearing was slated in October.

However, a petition by McClatchy to enlarge the issues to be considered in the tower site hearing such as to force a review of the comparative merits of its original 1952 application alongside that of Sacramento Telecasters was not looked on favorably. As a result, on February 10, 1958, McClatchy announced it would not pursue any further legal action in the case, "reluctantly" discontinuing its battle. The FCC examiner appointed for the tower site hearing then recommended the commission reaffirm the tower site change. McClatchy would eventually succeed at entering the Sacramento/Stockton television market in 1964, when it purchased Stockton station KOVR.

=== Corinthian ownership ===
In November 1958, after a month of negotiations, Sacramento Telecasters agreed to sell KBET-TV to the Great Western Broadcasting Corporation—a subsidiary of the J. H. Whitney Company of New York City, which operated the Corinthian Broadcasting group of television stations—for $4.55 million. The call sign was changed to KXTV on April 27, 1959. The station moved to its present tower site at the start of 1962, having jointly constructed it with KOVR and KCRA-TV.

The primary event in the early years of Corinthian operation was a strike that began on September 26, 1960, and stretched more than two years. The strike was touched off when management ordered two directors to leave the American Federation of Television and Radio Artists (AFTRA); 10 AFTRA members and another 32 of NABET joined the action. The strike lasted more than two years and featured a secondary boycott of the station led by the unions, leading to the loss of several advertising contracts; at various times, both parties were found to be guilty of unfair labor practices. In a final ruling at the end of 1964, the National Labor Relations Board found that unions were allowed to engage in publicity other than picketing and thus that their actions were protected. This was affirmed in 1966.

Corinthian purchased a studio site at 400 Broadway in downtown Sacramento to relocate KXTV in 1965; the 7th Avenue site was in the path of the proposed Interstate 5 freeway. The station moved on January 15, 1968, and the property was then sold to the state of California. In 1971, Corinthian merged with Dun & Bradstreet, a publisher of trade and technical publications and directories.

=== Belo ownership and affiliation switch to ABC ===
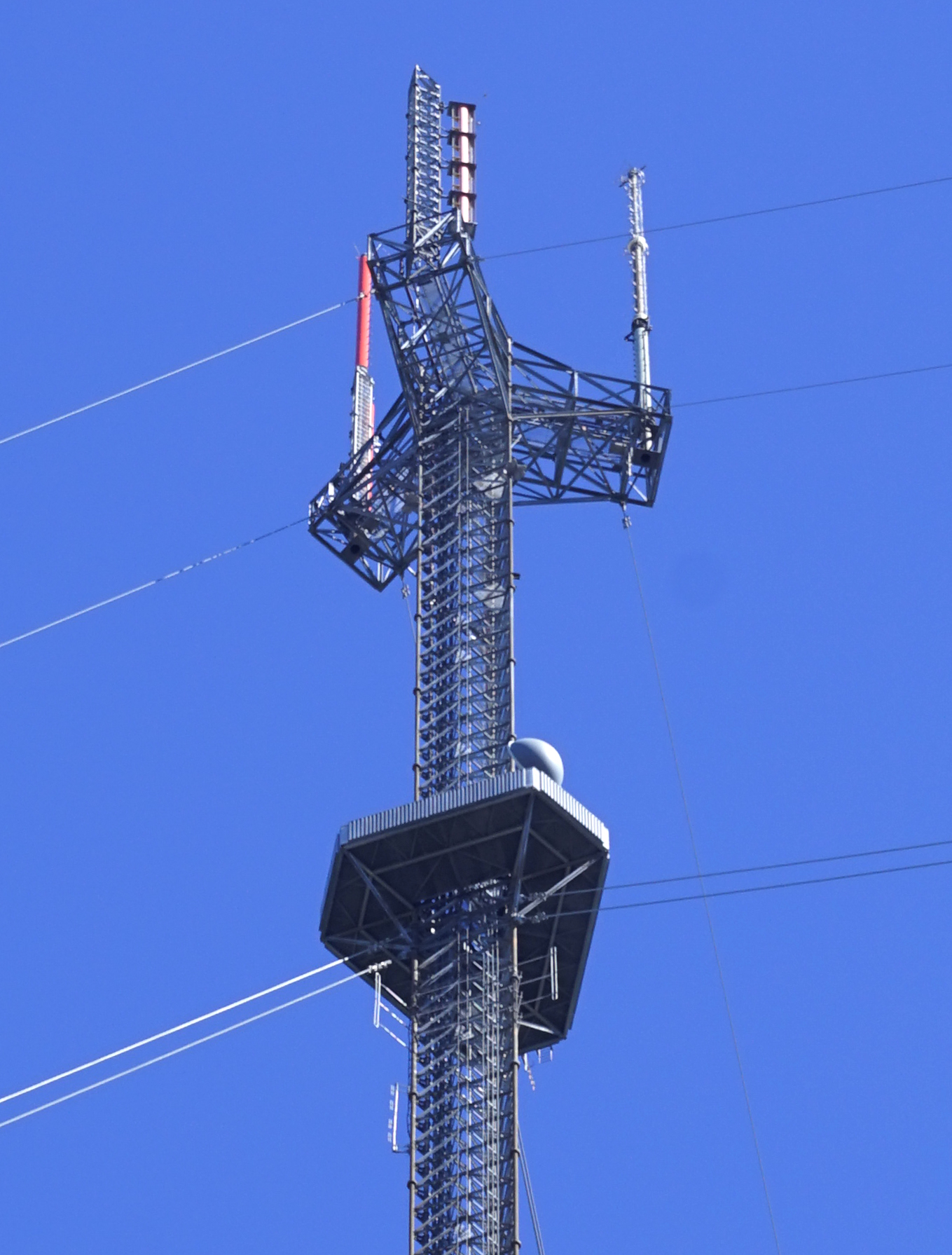
Closeup of the top of the KXTV/KOVR tower in Walnut Grove, from which KXTV's main signal is broadcast

The Corinthian group was sold to the A. H. Belo Corporation in 1984. Belo immediately made significant changes at the station to bolster its sagging ratings and local image. The present Walnut Grove tower was built in 1986.

On March 6, 1995, KXTV switched its affiliation to ABC, in a swap with KOVR-TV, which joined CBS. The affiliation switch was precipitated by Belo including KXTV in a renewal with its two ABC affiliates.

Over Belo's 15-year ownership of the station, it moved from third to second place in local news ratings, and the staff was expanded by 30 percent to 175 employees.

=== Gannett/Tegna ownership ===
In 1999, Belo traded KXTV and $55 million to the Gannett Company in exchange for KVUE, an ABC affiliate in Austin, Texas. The deal allowed Belo to enter the Texas state capital, a market of significant strategic importance to the Dallas-based company, and gave it a presence in two-thirds of Texas TV households. The deal closed in July, and the general manager of KVUE moved to Sacramento to run KXTV.

In 2000, the station constructed the News10 Weather Tower, which was finished by October but first lit on August 24, 2001, owing to the energy crisis in the state at the time. In addition to providing microwave transmission capabilities for the station—which had to trim trees at homes in the Land Park neighborhood prior to its installation—it originally functioned as a weather beacon with lighted LED elements on the top to indicate features of the weather forecast. As a result of the energy crisis, solar panels were installed on the roof to power the facility. In addition to weather, the tower was lit purple after each Sacramento Kings and Sacramento Monarchs win. While no longer lit, the tower still is used for KXTV's microwave needs, cellular service, and to broadcast KXTV's Sacramento UHF replacement translator.

KXTV became the broadcast television partner of the Kings midway through the 2002–03 season when a dispute erupted between the Kings and KMAX-TV (channel 31), who had been airing the team's games since 1988, over special editions of its morning show that the franchise felt traded on the team's name without its permission. As with its arrangement with that station, the Kings bought air time from KXTV, produced the telecasts, and sold the advertising; 25 games were telecast on KXTV in the first season. Several Monarchs women's basketball games were added in 2005. In 2009, the Kings moved all of their games to Comcast SportsNet (now NBC Sports California).

On June 29, 2015, Gannett's broadcasting and digital divisions split from the newspaper division under the Tegna Inc. name. Two months later, the station retired the long-running "News10" moniker to brand as "ABC 10", primarily to improve its ability to promote entertainment programming.

The KXTV studios were hit by gunfire in a drive-by shooting on September 19, 2025, with officers arriving on the scene shortly after 1:30 p.m. Despite no injuries being reported nor any motive being determined, detectives found handwritten notes by a 64-year-old retired lobbyist and Army veteran from Sacramento who was placed into federal custody after the shooting. The notes mentioned Jeffrey Epstein, Kash Patel, Dan Bongino, and Pam Bondi. During an investigation in his Sacramento apartment, a whiteboard planner attached to his refrigerator reading "Do the Next Scary Thing" was also investigated by authorities.

Nexstar Media Group, owner of KTXL in Sacramento, acquired Tegna in a deal announced in August 2025 and completed on March 19, 2026. A temporary restraining order issued one week later by the U.S. District Court for the Eastern District of California, later escalated to a preliminary injunction, has prevented Nexstar from integrating the stations.

== Programming ==
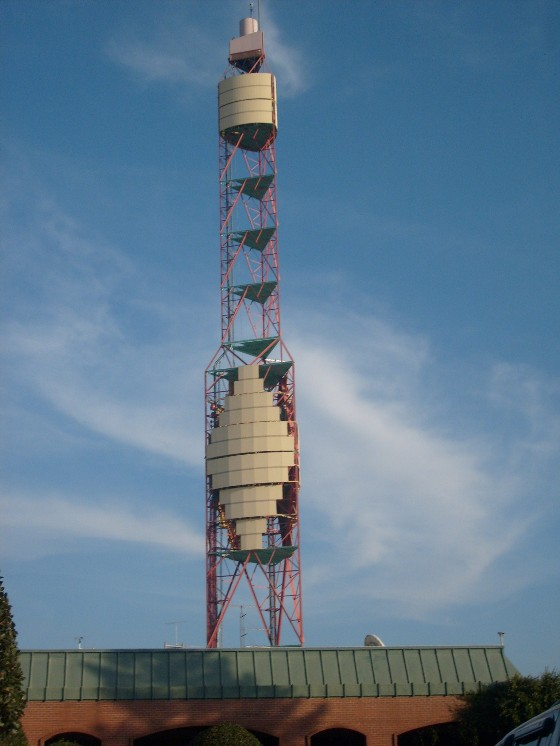
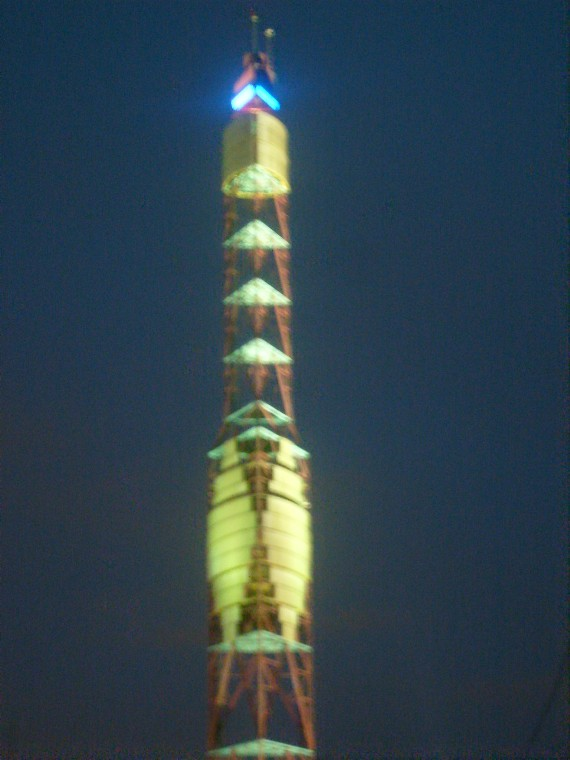
The ABC10 Weather Tower, as seen during the day and at night when the weather beacon was active

=== News operation ===
Local news was instituted from the station's beginning, with radio newsman Hank Thornley as the first anchor on KBET-TV, and slowly expanded through the 1960s. Even though at one point in the early 1970s KXTV briefly eclipsed it, the station has spent most of its history a distant second or third to KCRA-TV, the Sacramento area's traditional news leader. At times, not even KXTV and KOVR-TV combined could equal KCRA's news ratings.

Known under such names as The Big News, Channel 10 News, Newservice 10, and Eyewitness News, the "News 10" name was adopted in 1984 with Belo's takeover of the station. The 40-person news staff, the smallest in the market at the time, was expanded. Ratings rose and came closer to challenging KCRA. However, between 2006 and 2010, ratings fell, and KOVR surpassed KXTV in morning and early evening news.

In 2022, KXTV and reporter Brandon Rittiman were honored with a Alfred I. duPont–Columbia University Award for a series on the role electrical utility PG&E played in sparking the Camp Fire in 2018. The station won another in 2025 for "The Wild West of Education", a news series by reporter Andie Judson over failings and financial improprieties at Highlands Community Charter and Technical Schools.

=== Non-news programming ===
From the late 1980s to early 1990s, KXTV produced two nationally syndicated magazine programs: Scratch (which was aimed at young adults) and Pulse (which covered medical news), as well as Biba's Italian Kitchen, hosted by local restaurateur Biba Caggiano.

=== Notable former on-air staff ===
- Kiran Chetry
- Dana Jacobson

== Technical information and subchannels ==
KXTV is broadcast from a transmitter facility and tower shared with KOVR in Walnut Grove. Its signal is multiplexed:

Subchannels of KXTV
Subchannel	Res.	Short name	Programming
10.1	720p	KXTV	ABC
10.2	480i	Crime	True Crime Network
10.3	480i	Quest	Quest
10.4	480i	Laff	Laff
10.5	480i	COMET	Comet
10.6	480i	Nest	The Nest
10.7	480i	OPEN	365BLK
10.8	480i	QVC	(Blank)
10.9	480i	ShopLC	Shop LC

KXTV began broadcasting its digital signal on UHF channel 61 in 1999. The station shut down its analog signal, over VHF channel 10, on June 12, 2009, as part of the federally mandated transition from analog to digital television; channel 61 was removed from television use as part of the transition, and the digital signal relocated to VHF channel 10.

In 2014, KXTV filed to build a digital replacement translator broadcasting with 15 kW on UHF channel 36, located on the Weather Tower, to improve reception in the immediate Sacramento area. Construction of the translator was completed in October 2018.

Though it does not host any additional subchannels, KXTV is part of Sacramento's ATSC 3.0 (NextGen TV) deployment on KQCA, which began operating in July 2021.
