= KTVU (Stockton, California) =

Television station in Stockton, California (1953–1955)

- Stockton, California; United States
- Channels: Analog: 36 (UHF)

Programming
- Affiliations: Independent; (1953–1954); NBC (1954–1955)

Ownership
- Owner: San Joaquin Telecasters

History
- First air date: December 18, 1953
- Last air date: April 30, 1955

Technical information
- ERP: 537 kW
- HAAT: 1,630 ft (500 m)
- Transmitter coordinates: 37°49′17″N 121°46′49″W

KTVU (channel 36) was a television station in Stockton, California, United States, which broadcast from December 18, 1953, to April 30, 1955. An independent station and later an NBC affiliate, KTVU failed because of economic problems common to early UHF television stations.

== Construction and operation ==
When the Federal Communications Commission (FCC) lifted its four-year freeze on new television station applications in 1952, it designated 70 new UHF channels, including channel 36, which was allocated to Stockton. Knox LaRue and Lester E. Chenault applied for the new channel 36 in July 1952, and after refiling as a corporation known as San Joaquin Telecasters in December, the commission granted the application on January 8, 1953.

The antenna was erected at a mountaintop site dubbed Teleview Hill, 27 miles (43 km) west of Stockton in the Altamont Hills. The facility would deliver a then-record effective radiated power of 525,000 watts. Meanwhile, the former East Theater, erected in 1949, was renovated and converted into a television studio.

KTVU began broadcasting on the evening of December 18, 1953. The opening night of telecasting was curtailed because of a power failure. Originally an independent station, KTVU affiliated with NBC in May 1954.

A July 1954 reorganization saw original owners LaRue and Chenault exit their stakes, with the former devoting time to his radio ventures including Stockton radio station KSTN, and KTVU become fully owned by Browen Industries, owned by Warren Brown, Jr., and Leo Owens. In September, Stockton gained a second television station, KOVR (channel 13), which initially provided regional coverage to Stockton and San Francisco from its transmitter on Mount Diablo.

== Demise and legacy ==
On April 30, 1955, the station broadcast for the last time. Its general manager told the Stockton Record newspaper, "It is economically impractical to continue daily scheduling of programs for the present." Dwight Newton, radio and television columnist for the San Francisco Examiner, also cited competition with KOVR, a VHF station that could be received on all television sets.

Ashley L. Robison and Harry McCart, officers in Sacramento UHF station KCCC-TV (channel 40), purchased KTVU in August 1955 with the intention to operate it as a satellite of the Sacramento outlet; KTVU would eventually have its antenna pattern changed to focus on Stockton, Modesto, and Merced. The Sacramento UHF had previously been eyeing the establishment of a repeater in Pittsburg, in Contra Costa County. Sale talks were announced in July but collapsed in early August over the Stockton venture's indebtedness before being completed. In April 1956, Browen sued the two men that had bought San Joaquin Telecasters's capital stock and assets with the intention of restoring KTVU to service with KCCC; by this time, regional utility Pacific Gas and Electric Company had obtained a writ on the land because of an unpaid $12,000 electricity bill. Robison and McCart charged that Browen failed to fulfill certain conditions of the sale agreement. Other unpaid bills led to lawsuits that continued into 1956, including two motions filed by distributors of television films. For lack of prosecution of the construction permit, the FCC canceled it and deleted the KTVU call letters on May 22, 1956. In 1957, the former East Theater where KTVU had operated was reconverted to a picture house, the Capri.

In 1958, a new television station, KTVU, began broadcasting in Oakland. While it was stated that the call sign had no specific meaning at the time, a 1985 newspaper article posits that engineers for the new Oakland station, having worked for Stockton's KTVU, named it in tribute. By the end of 1964, channel 36 would be re-allocated to San Jose, and a new station, today's KICU-TV, now a sister station to Oakland's KTVU, would begin broadcasting in 1967.
