= KOVR =

Television station in Stockton, California

- Stockton–Sacramento–Modesto, California; United States
- City: Stockton, California
- Channels: Digital: 25 (UHF); Virtual: 13
- Branding: CBS 13; CBS 13 News / CBS News Sacramento

Programming
- Affiliations: 13.1: CBS; for others, see § Subchannels

Ownership
- Owner: CBS Television Stations; (Sacramento Television Stations, Inc.)
- Sister stations: KMAX-TV

History
- First air date: September 6, 1954
- Former call signs: KHOF (CP, 1954); KOVR-TV (1980–1989)
- Former channel numbers: Analog: 13 (VHF, 1954–2009)
- Former affiliations: Independent (1954–1957); ABC (1957–1995)
- Call sign meaning: "Coverage"; the original facility covered San Francisco, Sacramento, and Stockton

Technical information
- Licensing authority: FCC
- Facility ID: 56550
- ERP: 1,000 kW
- HAAT: 593 m (1,946 ft)
- Transmitter coordinates: 38°14′24″N 121°30′7″W

Links
- Public license information: Public file; LMS
- Website: www.cbsnews.com/sacramento/

KOVR (channel 13) is a television station licensed to Stockton, California, United States, serving as the CBS outlet for the Sacramento area. It is owned and operated by the network's CBS Television Stations division alongside KMAX-TV (channel 31), an independent station. The two stations share studios on KOVR Drive in West Sacramento; KOVR's transmitter is located in Walnut Grove, California.

After an application process stretching back to 1948, KOVR began broadcasting in September 1954 from studios in Stockton and a transmitter atop Mount Diablo. This facility provided wide coverage from San Francisco to Sacramento and beyond, but KOVR could not obtain a network affiliation in the San Francisco market, and it had to pay higher programming costs as a San Francisco station. To remedy these issues, the station moved transmitter sites in 1957, becoming fully a Stockton- and Sacramento-area station, and obtained an affiliation with ABC. It partly merged with Sacramento's original ABC affiliate, KCCC-TV, a struggling ultra high frequency (UHF) station.

After moving, the station was sold twice before being acquired by newspaper publisher McClatchy in 1963. This made KOVR a sister to the KFBK radio stations in Sacramento as well as The Sacramento Bee newspaper; it marked McClatchy's entry into local television after an unsuccessful attempt to win channel 10 in the 1950s. McClatchy sold the station in 1980 under intense government pressure on owners of newspaper-broadcast combinations, and it changed hands another six times from 1983 to 1996. The station became a CBS affiliate in 1995 as the result of an affiliation switch and was purchased by CBS in 2005; uniquely, it broadcasts prime time programming one hour ahead of other West Coast stations. Traditionally a third-rated station in local news, ratings have gradually improved for its newscasts since the 1990s.

== History ==
=== The Mount Diablo years ===
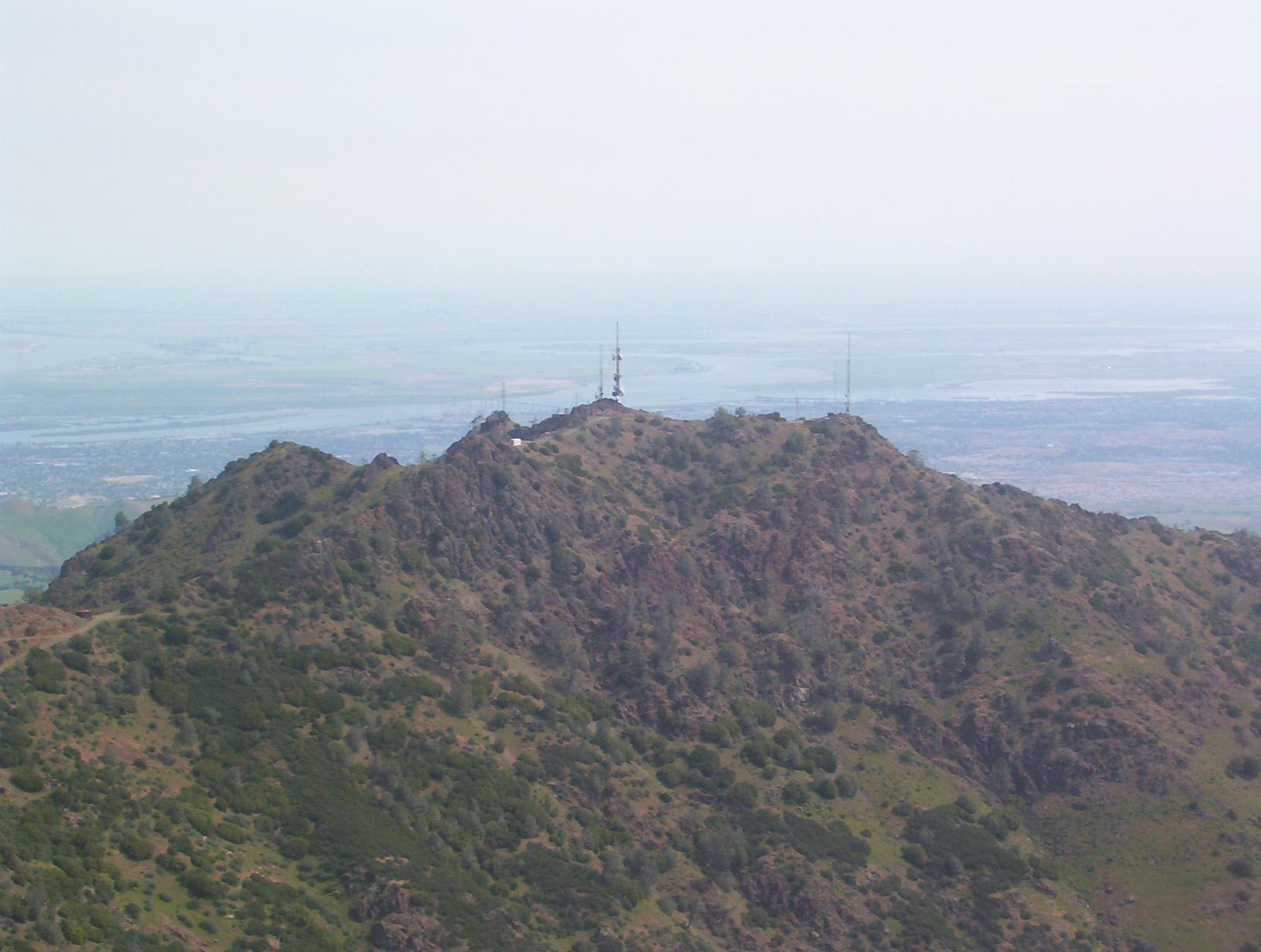
KOVR broadcast from Mount Diablo from 1954 to 1957.

On March 5, 1948, Radio Diablo, Inc. (later Television Diablo) filed an application for a new television station to broadcast on channel 13, first assigned to San Francisco and then to San Jose, from Mount Diablo in Contra Costa County. From Mount Diablo, the principals in Radio Diablo operated FM station KSBR, which had an effective radiated power of 250,000 watts and, having just moved to the mountaintop, claimed it was heard from the Oregon state line to Bakersfield. Two other groups applied for the channel by late 1948, but the Federal Communications Commission (FCC) imposed a freeze on new television station grants that October.

When the freeze ended in 1952, channel 13 had been removed from San Jose to Stockton, where it could still cover the city of license from Mount Diablo. Stockton radio station KXOB filed a competing application for channel 13. Radio Diablo, headed by O. H. Brown, estimated it could serve 3.5 million people in San Francisco, Stockton, and Sacramento from its mountaintop site. The owners of KXOB ultimately received shares in Radio Diablo in exchange for the dismissal of KXOB's competing application in a settlement agreement. Broadcaster and furniture store owner Edward Peffer entered into a similar agreement, paving the way for the FCC to grant Radio Diablo the construction permit on February 11, 1954. Leslie Hoffman, who had become the new president of the company, was to have the station named for him as KHOF, but when Hoffman thought of the possibility of "cough" puns based on the designation, the call sign was changed to KOVR, for "coverage".

KOVR began broadcasting September 6, 1954; after an opening night telecast produced in the Stockton studios, it aired live coverage from the California State Fair. It had studios in Stockton on Miner Avenue, as well as a converted bus that served as a remote broadcast van along with two other mobile units. KOVR was the second television station in Stockton; an ultra high frequency (UHF) outlet, KTVU (channel 36), had gone on the air the previous December.

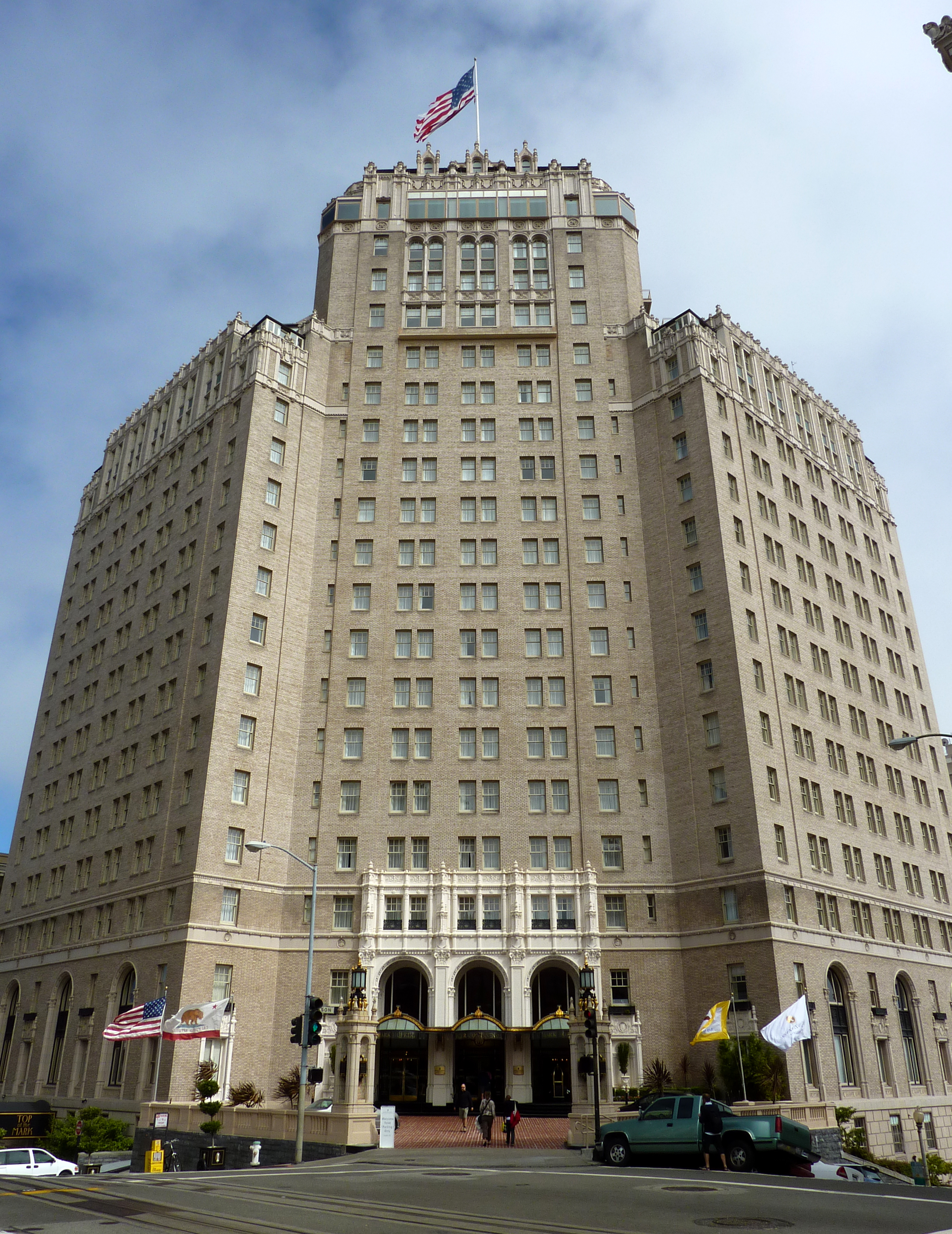
In 1955, KOVR opened secondary studios and offices in San Francisco's Mark Hopkins Hotel.

As an independent station without network affiliation (but with a secondary link with DuMont, primarily for NFL games and Life Is Worth Living), the program schedule was heavy with local programming. Lynn Taylor hosted a talent show, a weeknight "Do It Yourself" show, and a teen program. Sportscaster Bob Fouts began commuting to Stockton from San Francisco to host a sports show, leaving KGO-TV in that city, and regional news coverage and a bingo program were also slated. Art Finley hosted an afternoon children's program, Toonytown, on the station for several years before moving to San Francisco's KRON-TV.

By 1955, the station had opened offices in San Francisco, where at one point it was proposed that NBC might try to affiliate with or purchase KOVR given discord with KRON-TV, its San Francisco affiliate, and a desire by NBC to own its San Francisco outlet. An attempt to move its main operation from Stockton to San Francisco was denied by the FCC as it would have stripped Stockton of its lone very high frequency (VHF) television station and there were already several television channels allotted to the Bay Area. The company did announce it would add a studio in San Francisco on a secondary basis. This studio was located in the Mark Hopkins Hotel, where the San Francisco offices were also relocated. In December 1955, Variety magazine reported that CBS, which coveted a VHF owned-and-operated station to serve San Francisco but had affiliate KPIX-TV there instead, was bidding on KOVR.

As time went on, it became clear that a network affiliation was necessary to provide KOVR with adequate programming and secure its economic viability. Bob Foster, the media critic for The Times newspaper in San Mateo, described the station as "suffering from the lack of sponsors, the lack of network affiliation—at least one that meant anything—and from a lack of good programs". DuMont ceased operating as a network in 1955, but KOVR continued to carry the network's sole remaining program, Boxing from St. Nicholas Arena. The station found itself paying for films and syndicated programs at San Francisco market rates while selling advertising at rates befitting its city of license, the much smaller Stockton; if it were to move out of the San Francisco market, it could cut its film acquisition costs by half. KOVR had no prospect of obtaining a network alliance in the San Francisco market. However, opportunity lay in Sacramento. By 1956, there were three television stations in Sacramento itself. On the VHF band were CBS affiliate KBET-TV (channel 10) and NBC affiliate KCRA-TV (channel 3), which had begun the year before, and a UHF station, KCCC-TV (channel 40), which was the local outlet for ABC and had been in service since 1953. As not all television sets could receive UHF, UHF stations were generally at a disadvantage to VHF stations, which networks and advertisers preferred to air their programming. In a bid to obtain the ABC affiliation while eliminating overlap with ABC-owned KGO-TV in San Francisco, KOVR filed in August 1956 to move from Mount Diablo to Butte Mountain near Jackson in Amador County, a proposal that blindsided KCCC-TV. This application was initially approved by the FCC in November, though KCCC-TV management protested the decision as a Stockton station encroaching on the Sacramento market. As a result, the FCC stayed its grant of the construction permit in January 1957.

KOVR blindsided KCCC-TV again in February 1957 when it announced that, beginning February 17, it would become an ABC affiliate, something that the network had previously promised KCCC-TV as not forthcoming until after the Butte Mountain move was approved. The relocation application was granted again in April after KCCC-TV withdrew its opposition.

On May 31, 1957, KCCC-TV ceased broadcasting in what amounted to a partial merger with KOVR. The Stockton station became the ABC affiliate of record for Sacramento—already simulcasting many ABC programs with channel 40—as KCCC-TV owner Lincoln Dellar purchased stock in Television Diablo. The move to Butte Mountain became effective on October 28, 1957, taking KOVR out of conflict with the Bay Area television stations and cementing its status as a Stockton station serving Sacramento instead of San Francisco.

=== Gannett and Metromedia ownership ===
As work continued on the Butte Mountain transmitter, Television Diablo began to seek a buyer for KOVR. It first proposed to sell the station to the Hudson Valley Broadcasting Company of Albany, New York—which was in the process of buying a television station in Durham, North Carolina, and renaming itself the Capital Cities Broadcasting Company; despite the FCC's approval, this sale was not consummated and was dismissed in November. Weeks later, the Gannett Company of Rochester, New York, entered into an agreement to acquire the station, taking ownership in February 1958. For Gannett, KOVR was far-flung compared to its other media properties. It owned radio and television stations in New York and Illinois as well as newspapers in those states, New Jersey, and Connecticut. The next year, KOVR reopened KCCC-TV's former Sacramento studios on Garden Highway, also providing use of the facilities by new educational station KVIE.

After less than two years of ownership, as well as the end of talks between Gannett and 20th Century Fox, Gannett applied to sell KOVR to the Metropolitan Broadcasting Company, owned by John Kluge, in 1959. This company renamed itself Metromedia in 1961. During Metromedia's ownership of KOVR, the station participated in the Trans-Tower project that built a common transmission facility for Sacramento's three commercial television stations in Walnut Grove. Expanding production of commercials and other programming in Sacramento eventually led KOVR to leave the Garden Highway facilities and renovate a former Red Heart bakery on Arden Way to serve as its Sacramento studio and news center, operating alongside the Miner Avenue plant in Stockton.

=== The McClatchy years ===
On October 4, 1963, Metromedia announced it would sell KOVR for $7.65 million (equivalent to $61.6 million in 2025 dollars) to McClatchy Newspapers, publisher of The Sacramento Bee and The Modesto Bee newspapers and owner of radio stations KBEE (970 AM) in Modesto and KFBK (1530 AM) and KFBK-FM 92.5 in Sacramento. For McClatchy, the contract to buy a television station serving Sacramento fulfilled a long-held dream of the company. McClatchy had desired to build a station in Sacramento since 1948, when it applied for channel 10. While an FCC examiner's initial decision favored McClatchy for the station, its competition, a group known as Sacramento Telecasters and consisting of non-broadcast interests, successfully objected to the award on diversification of media ownership grounds, with the FCC unanimously overturning the examiner and granting Sacramento Telecasters the permit for what signed on as KBET-TV. McClatchy continued legal action to try and force a rehearing on its proposal until February 1958.

Several groups expressed concern about concentration of media ownership. The sale was initially opposed by a group calling itself the Citizens Committee to Promote Fair Coverage, which felt that a McClatchy purchase of KOVR would result in a "monopoly of news", while the Stockton city council, fearful of the station reducing its presence in its city of license, initially voted unanimously to request an FCC hearing before rescinding the resolution after Eleanor McClatchy wrote to the body, assuring them that the station would not leave. The FCC initially indicated the deal would require a hearing, an action recommended by commission staff, but reversed course in July 1964, approving the acquisition on a 5–2 vote.

McClatchy's ownership of KOVR was dogged by groups seeking to force the matter on antitrust issues as early as the late 1960s. In 1969, McKeon Construction, a Sacramento firm, asked a U.S. district court to void the FCC's 1964 approval of the sale, which it claimed enhanced an existing monopoly on regional advertising; McClatchy sources told Broadcasting magazine that the firm's ire had likely been provoked by unflattering coverage of its owner and of political pressures placed by Sacramento construction companies. The lawsuit was dropped in 1971. Similarly, in 1974, the San Joaquin County Economic Development Association appealed to the FCC and asked it to review whether KOVR was adequately serving Stockton.

=== Cross-ownership woes ===
A new tenor taken by federal regulators toward cross-ownership of newspapers and broadcast stations significantly escalated the public pressure on McClatchy to act. In 1975, the FCC moved to bar future acquisitions that created cross-ownership and ordered 16 such groups in small markets to break up their holdings, though others were allowed to remain grandfathered. Two years later, on March 1, 1977, a federal appeals court amplified the policy; instead of merely barring future purchases against the rule, it ordered the divestiture of all such pairings except those that were in the public interest.

Within days, McClatchy announced an agreement with Multimedia, Inc., designed to extricate both groups from their heaviest cross-ownership burdens. Where McClatchy owned a newspaper, AM, FM, and TV stations between Sacramento and Stockton, Multimedia had a similar situation in Greenville, South Carolina: two newspapers (morning daily The Greenville News and the afternoon The Greenville Piedmont), WFBC and WFBC-FM radio, as well as WFBC-TV, an NBC-affiliated TV station. McClatchy and Multimedia proposed a straight trade whereby the former would acquire WFBC-TV and Multimedia would receive KOVR; as a result, neither company would own a newspaper and a TV station in the same market. Petitions were lodged against the deal by organizations in Greenville and Sacramento, as well as the San Joaquin Communications Corporation. The former two groups emphasized the unfamiliarity of the companies to their new markets, calling McClatchy "totally foreign" to upstate South Carolina and Multimedia "completely unknown to the Sacramento community". The latter had been in a legal battle since 1974 seeking to wrest KMJ-TV in Fresno from McClatchy control. While the community organizations abandoned their opposition to the trade, San Joaquin Communications Corporation refused to yield, and the transaction reached its deadline date of March 1, 1978, without being adjudicated by the FCC. Negotiations to extend the term failed, and the deal was called off by mutual agreement later that month.

McClatchy entered into an agreement to sell KMJ-TV to the San Joaquin Communications Corporation in May 1979, seeking to avoid a lengthy legal battle over the Fresno outlet. The company then decided to put KOVR, its only other television station, up for sale. Citing "increasingly strong government opposition" to cross-ownership, president C. K. McClatchy II noted that he felt it was in the community interest to ensure an "orderly transition" of ownership at KOVR.

=== Changing ownership, falling ratings ===
On July 5, 1979, McClatchy announced it would sell KOVR to The Outlet Company of Providence, Rhode Island, for $65 million (equivalent to $232 million in 2025 dollars). C. K. McClatchy noted that Outlet was selected despite not making the highest offer because it had committed to ensuring local minority ownership in KOVR by selling 10 percent of the station's stock to minorities. The deal, consummated in May 1980, was the second-most expensive single-station TV station transaction ever at the time. To reduce debt incurred in the KOVR purchase, Outlet sold 91 department stores. During Outlet ownership, ratings for KOVR's newscasts fell to third place, behind KXTV and far behind a dominant KCRA. This occurred despite an infusion of resources to improve KOVR's news ratings.

The Outlet sale was the first in seven different ownership transactions involving KOVR between 1980 and 1996. In what was the second-largest group station deal for its time, in 1983, Outlet was purchased by the Rockefeller Group after Coca-Cola walked away from a purchase agreement the year before. After the Rockefeller purchase, KOVR became the first station in Northern California to broadcast in stereo sound, doing so in February 1985. It also became the first local broadcast home of the newly relocated Sacramento Kings basketball team in 1985.

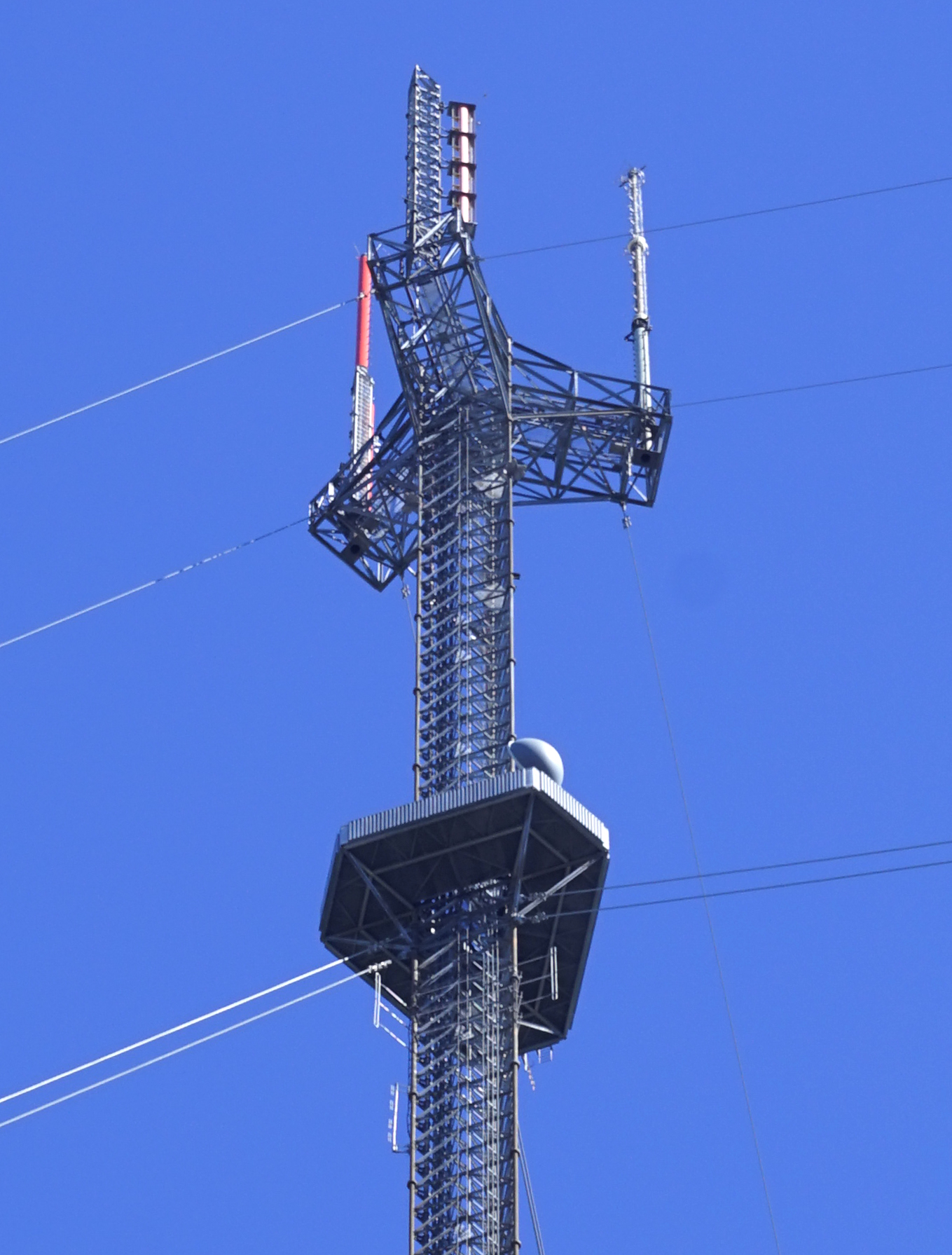
Closeup of the top of the KXTV/KOVR tower in Walnut Grove, from which KOVR's signal is broadcast

In a management buyout that restored Outlet Communications to separate status, Rockefeller Group sold the firm in 1986 for $625 million (equivalent to $1.55 billion in 2025 dollars). To raise capital, some stations were immediately divested, among them KOVR, which was sold for $104 million (equivalent to $259 million in 2025 dollars) to another Rhode Island concern, Narragansett Capital Corporation, as its first television property. Amidst these two transactions, KOVR laid off 10 employees, and morale was low due to poor ratings in part attributable to the national underperformance of ABC at the time. The Kings telecasts had been one of the station's bright spots, but the team sued KOVR in August 1986 for breach of contract, alleging the station owed it hundreds of thousands of dollars and had tried to renegotiate the pact; it was another three years before a judge ruled in favor of the Kings. Also in 1986, the station broke ground on its present transmission tower, a 2,049-foot (625 m) mast in Walnut Grove, in a joint venture with KXTV. Otherwise, Narragansett—a holding company, not a broadcasting firm—generally underinvested in KOVR; one rival broadcaster commented that the company had "stripped the station clean".

=== AnchorMedia ownership and move to West Sacramento ===
In 1988, Narragansett received between seven and eleven offers, all unsolicited, for KOVR, and it opted to cash out by selling the station to AnchorMedia, a broadcasting company owned by Texas billionaire Robert Bass, for $162 million (equivalent to $380 million in 2025 dollars)—a price considered to be "top dollar". The Bass Group had been making major business investments in Sacramento, including a purchase of land in Roseville and the acquisition of the insolvent American Savings and Loan in Stockton. AnchorMedia sued Narragansett for allegedly withholding information and taking away key employees.

The immediate task facing AnchorMedia management was one of procuring a new facility, as the Arden Way site had become overcrowded and insufficient for KOVR's needs. Outlet had bought land in Natomas for a potential new studio site, but Narragansett sold the parcel; Anchor began scouting property in West Sacramento. In late 1990, the new $8 million (equivalent to $17.4 million in 2025 dollars), 43,000-square-foot (4,000 m^{2}) facility opened, featuring two studios and a helipad for the station's news helicopter.

=== River City and Sinclair ownership; affiliation switch to CBS ===
In 1994, AnchorMedia—by then known as Continental Broadcasting—was purchased by River City Broadcasting, a St. Louis-based owner of television and radio properties. The three ABC affiliates owned by Anchor represented River City's first major network affiliates. River City found itself navigating an affiliation switch shortly after its purchase. Amid a major national realignment, the A. H. Belo Corporation and ABC renewed their agreement for Belo's ABC-affiliated stations in Dallas and Norfolk, Virginia, including the move of ABC's Sacramento affiliation to the higher-rated KXTV. As a result, KOVR aligned with CBS. The switch took place on March 6, 1995.

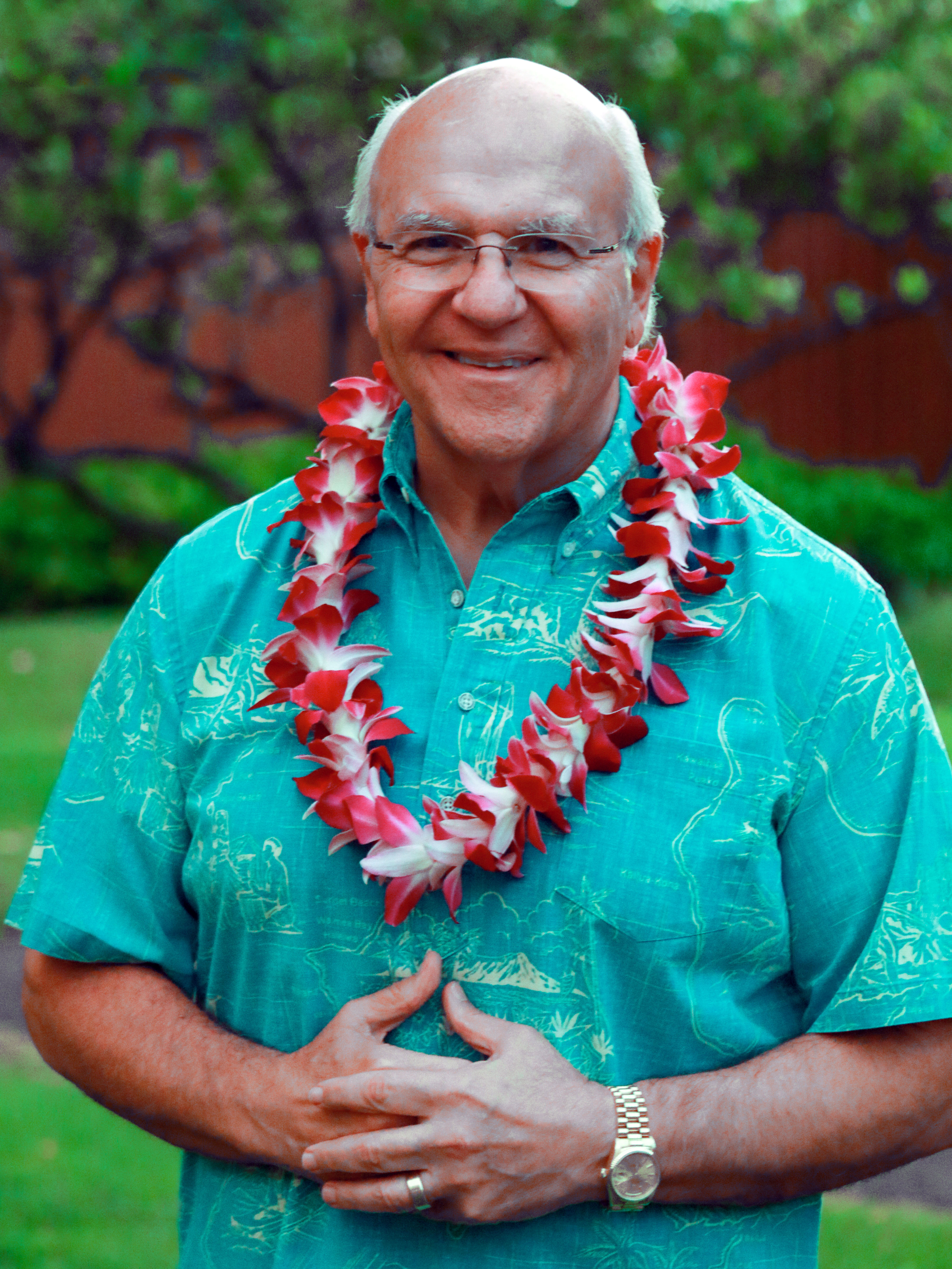
Rick Blangiardi was president of River City Broadcasting and interim general manager of KOVR when it switched to CBS, adopting an early prime time schedule for channel 13.

Uniquely for the market, KOVR adopted an early prime time schedule and aired weeknight CBS programming from 7 to 10 p.m. instead of from 8 to 11 p.m. At the time, KPIX-TV, the CBS affiliate in San Francisco, programmed on a similar basis (abandoning the practice in 1998), and KCRA-TV had done so with NBC programming between 1991 and 1993. The early prime move was designed to help KOVR's ratings by airing its late news for one hour at 10 p.m. and counterprogramming the 11 p.m. newscasts with The Late Show with David Letterman. River City Broadcasting president and KOVR interim general manager Rick Blangiardi had previously been the general manager of KPIX and saw the scheduling practice as an opportunity. For the seventh time in 16 years, KOVR was sold again in 1996 when River City Broadcasting was acquired by Sinclair Broadcast Group of Baltimore.

=== CBS ownership ===
By 2004, Sinclair was eyeing the creation of duopolies in as many markets as possible and seeking to sell stations in markets where it had no feasible options to create one. One of those markets was Sacramento. As a result, Sinclair agreed to sell KOVR to the Viacom Television Stations Group—the owned-and-operated stations division of CBS—in December 2004 for $285 million (equivalent to $465 million in 2025 dollars). This created a duopoly with then-UPN affiliate KMAX-TV (channel 31). In order to remain under ownership limits for radio stations in Sacramento, Viacom sold San Francisco radio station KFRC (610 AM).

While operations of KMAX-TV moved in with KOVR in West Sacramento, resulting in the layoffs of 11 newly redundant employees, $7 million (equivalent to $11.1 million in 2025 dollars) was spent on capital improvements at the studios, where some of the equipment had not been replaced since AnchorMedia built the facility 15 years prior. Though speculation emerged at the time of the sale that CBS might abolish the early prime scheduling that KOVR had used for a decade, thereby bringing the station in line with its other West Coast outlets, CBS ultimately preserved the practice and even expanded it by shifting weekend programming up an hour in 2006.

== News operation ==
Local news started with the station in 1954; the original news department consisted of three full-time employees and a part-time photographer, with Mel Riddle as news anchor and editor. In the early years, the station provided extensive film footage of events and used its remote vans to cover such events as flooding in Marysville.

Traditionally, KOVR's newscasts placed third in the Sacramento market. At times, not even KXTV and KOVR combined could equal KCRA-TV's news ratings. Newscasts were produced from both the Stockton and Sacramento studios, and the geographic distance between the news crews sometimes hampered the functioning of the news operation. Even though KOVR's news budget often exceeded that of KXTV, KOVR typically tied that station or was narrowly edged out.

In the 1990s and early 2000s, despite a general lack of investment from Sinclair—which stripped the station of its helicopter and satellite truck and abandoned having a weeknight sports anchor—and a comparatively underresourced position, the lean KOVR news operation began to show signs of improvement and increased ratings. In 1994, longtime KCRA-TV anchor Stan Atkinson moved to KOVR and presented the station's weeknight newscasts until his retirement in 1999.

As part of Viacom's remake of KOVR's news department, Sam Shane, a former KCRA-TV anchor who spent two years at MSNBC, was hired to anchor the station's newscasts, and personnel were shuffled on other programs; a 4 p.m. newscast was also added. Between 2006 and 2010, KOVR surpassed KXTV in morning and early evening news.

In addition to its morning, noon, and evening news offerings, the KOVR-KMAX news operation produces Good Day (formerly Good Day Sacramento) for KMAX. By 2019, KOVR was also airing an 11 p.m. late local newscast.

As part of a rollout of streaming news channels across the CBS station group, CBSN Sacramento (now CBS News Sacramento) began operating on June 16, 2021.

=== Notable former on-air staff ===
- Stan Atkinson – anchor, 1994–1999
- Claudia Cowan – anchor/reporter
- Kristine Hanson – meteorologist
- Lois Hart – anchor
- Bob Hilton – anchor
- Kim Khazei – anchor/reporter, 1989–1990
- Kinsey Schofield – anchor/reporter for Good Day Sacramento, 2017
- Steve Somers – sports anchor
- Dave Walker – anchor
- Jim Wieder – reporter/anchor

== Technical information ==
=== Subchannels ===
KOVR's transmitter is located on the KXTV/KOVR tower in Walnut Grove, California. The station's signal is multiplexed:

Subchannels of KOVR
Subchannel	Res.	Short name	Programming
13.1	1080i	KOVR-DT	CBS
13.2	480i	StartTV	Start TV
13.3	480i	DABL	Dabl
13.4	480i	Outlaw	Outlaw
13.5	480i	Catchy	Catchy Comedy

Though it does not host any additional subchannels, KOVR is part of Sacramento's ATSC 3.0 (NextGen TV) deployment on KQCA, which began operating in July 2021.

=== Analog-to-digital conversion ===
KOVR shut down its analog signal, over VHF channel 13, on June 12, 2009, as part of the federally mandated transition from analog to digital television. The station's digital signal remained on its pre-transition UHF channel 25.
