= KCPQ =

Television station in Tacoma, Washington

- Tacoma–Seattle, Washington; United States
- City: Tacoma, Washington
- Channels: Digital: 13 (VHF); Virtual: 13
- Branding: Fox 13 Seattle

Programming
- Affiliations: 13.1: Fox; for others, see § Subchannels

Ownership
- Owner: Fox Television Stations, LLC
- Sister stations: KZJO

History
- First air date: August 2, 1953
- Former call signs: KMO-TV (1953–1954); KTVW (1954–1976); KCPQ-TV (1976–1980)
- Former channel numbers: Analog: 13 (VHF, 1953–2009); Digital: 18 (UHF, 1998–2009)
- Former affiliations: NBC (August–December 1953); Independent (1953–1974; 1980–1986); Dark (1974–1976; 1980); PBS (1976–1980)
- Call sign meaning: Station was owned by the Clover Park School District

Technical information
- Licensing authority: FCC
- Facility ID: 33894
- ERP: 30 kW
- HAAT: 610 m (2,001 ft)
- Transmitter coordinates: 47°32′52″N 122°48′27″W
- Translator(s): 22 (UHF) Seattle; KZJO 22.2; for others, see § Translators

Links
- Public license information: Public file; LMS
- Website: www.fox13seattle.com

KCPQ (channel 13) is a television station licensed to Tacoma, Washington, United States, serving the Seattle area. It is owned and operated by the Fox network through its Fox Television Stations division alongside KZJO (channel 22), an independent station with MyNetworkTV. The two stations share studios on 9th Avenue in the Denny Triangle section of downtown Seattle; KCPQ's main transmitter is located on Gold Mountain in Bremerton.

The station signed on in August 1953 as KMO-TV, the television outgrowth of Tacoma radio station KMO. It was briefly an NBC network affiliate until another Seattle station signed on; the next year, KMO radio and television were sold to separate owners. The Seattle broadcaster J. Elroy McCaw bought channel 13, changed the call sign to KTVW, and ran it as an independent station. While KTVW produced a number of local programs, McCaw, a famously parsimonious owner, never converted the station to broadcast in color, and its syndicated programming inventory was considered meager. McCaw died in August 1969; three years later, his estate sold the station to the Blaidon Mutual Investors Corporation. While Blaidon tried several new programs and began color telecasting, the station continued to underperform financially. Two attempts to sell KTVW to out-of-state buyers failed because of its high liabilities. After a walkout by employees in January and the appointment of a receiver in July, KTVW was ordered closed on December 12, 1974.

The Clover Park School District in Lakewood purchased KTVW at bankruptcy auction in 1975. The station returned to the air on a non-commercial basis as KCPQ in January 1976, serving as an effective replacement for Clover Park's UHF station, KPEC-TV (channel 56). Changes to the structure of school financing in Washington and the refusal of voters to approve bonds to rebuild Clover Park High School forced the school district to sell KCPQ back into commercial use. After being off the air for most of 1980 to relocate its transmitter, KCPQ returned under new owner Kelly Broadcasting, who rebuilt it as a more competitive independent station. During Kelly's 19-year ownership of KCPQ, the station became a Fox affiliate, relocated its studios from Lakewood to Seattle, and established its present local news department.

KCPQ was sold to Tribune Broadcasting in 1999 as part of Kelly's exit from the broadcasting industry. As Tribune expanded the station's news output, it also had to fend off overtures by Fox, which had sought to own KCPQ on several occasions since the 1990s and at one point threatened to buy another station to broadcast Fox programming. Tribune was purchased by Nexstar Media Group in 2019; Nexstar then traded KCPQ to Fox as part of an exchange of Fox affiliates in three cities.

== History ==
=== As KMO-TV/KTVW ===
In December 1952, the Federal Communications Commission (FCC) simultaneously granted applications to broadcast on very high frequency (VHF) channels 11 and 13 in Tacoma; channel 13 was awarded to radio station KMO (1360 AM). The station began broadcasting as KMO-TV on August 2, 1953, from studios in Tacoma and a transmitter near Ruston.

KMO-TV briefly carried NBC programs until Seattle's KOMO-TV began broadcasting on December 11. After that, KMO-TV's output primarily consisted of local and syndicated programs. Within a year of starting the TV station, owner Carl E. Haymond—who had built KMO radio in 1926—sought to exit the broadcasting business, having already sold stakes in radio stations in California and Arizona. He first attempted to sell KMO radio and television together to the owners of Seattle radio station KAYO (1150 AM) for $350,000 (equivalent to $3.32 million in 2025); the unusually low purchase price was attributed to the station's lack of network affiliation and its financial losses. The FCC indicated the necessity of a hearing to approve the sale due to the then-impermissible overlap of the Seattle and Tacoma radio stations' coverage areas; the deal was then scrapped several weeks later. In July, Haymond sold KMO-TV for $300,000 (equivalent to $2.85 million in 2025) to J. Elroy McCaw, a Seattle-based radio station owner.

With KMO-TV separated from KMO radio, the television station changed its call sign to KTVW in October 1954 and announced plans to open auxiliary offices in Seattle. The station also began airing Seattle Americans minor-league hockey, which was connected to KTVW in several ways. For two months, KTVW's general manager served as the team's president; when he resigned for a television job in Los Angeles, McCaw became the team's sole owner. At this time, the Americans were the only professional hockey club to televise all their home games. Between 1955 and 1958, the station operated Seattle studios at 230 8th Avenue North; at one point, while the station relocated its Tacoma facility, all of channel 13's live shows temporarily originated from Seattle.

McCaw tried to make several moves to improve channel 13's positioning in the late 1950s. In an unusual arrangement, the station briefly aired the CBS network news in late 1957 when Tacoma's then-CBS affiliate, KTNT-TV (channel 11), dropped the CBS Evening News with Douglas Edwards to make way for an expanded local news program. CBS, which wanted the newscast to continue to air in the Seattle market until KIRO-TV could sign on as the market's CBS station (which it would do on February 8, 1958), arranged for the network hookup to bring the program to KTVW on an interim basis. In 1957, McCaw filed to move the transmitter from Tacoma to Queen Anne Hill in Seattle, which would have come with an upgrade to the maximum 316,000 watts; local residents objected to the erection of another TV tower in the area and to McCaw's proposal to create a "tower park" that would have required the demolition of 75 to 80 homes. This proposal had stalled by 1958, when it was reported that the owners of Los Angeles station KCOP-TV, including Bing Crosby, were negotiating to buy KTVW and another independent station McCaw owned, Denver's KTVR. Ultimately, the station increased its effective radiated power from the Ruston transmitter from 100,000 to 214,000 watts in 1960.

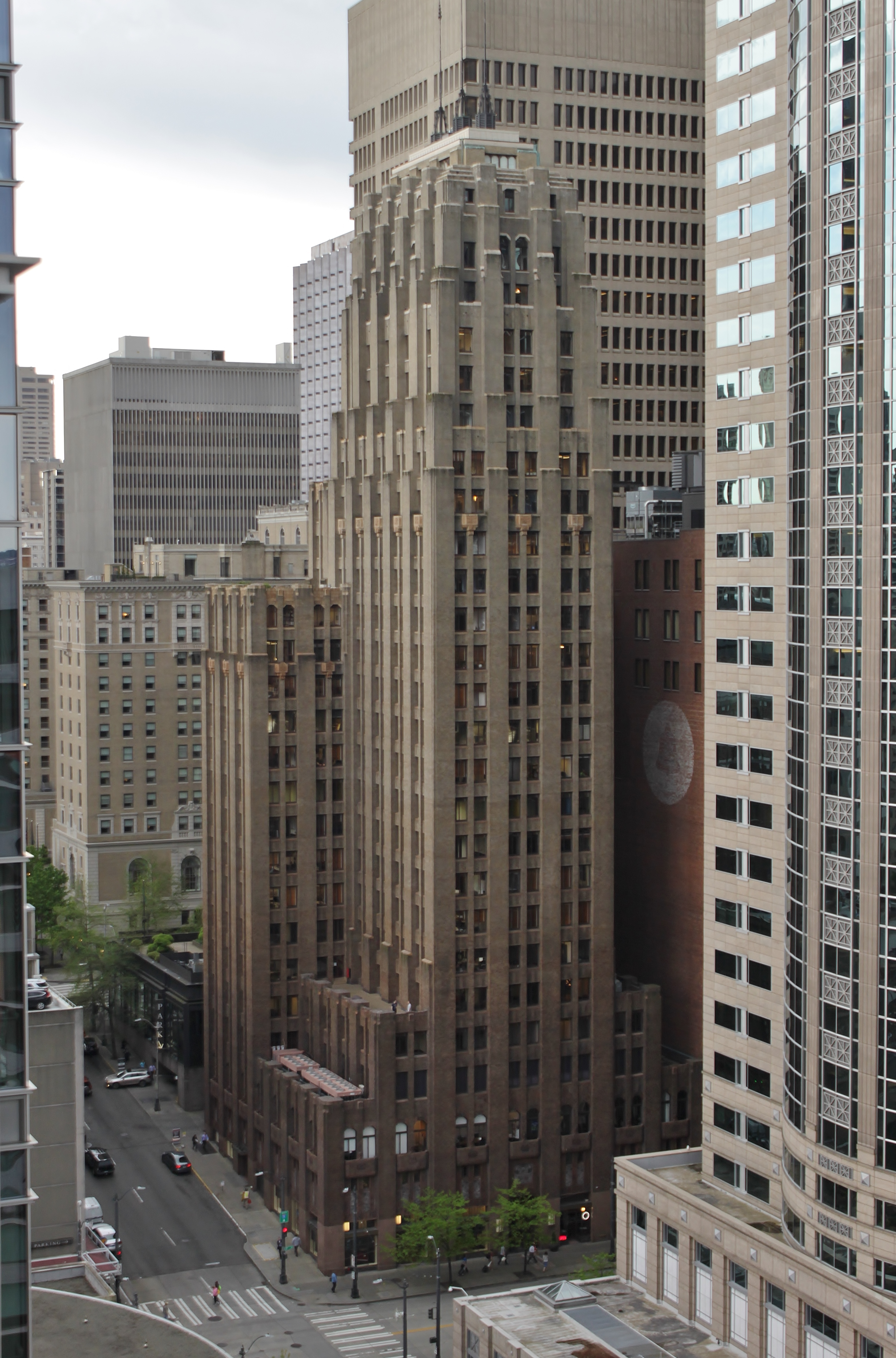
From 1967 to 1970, KTVW aired a daily stock market program produced from studios in the Northern Life Tower in Seattle.

McCaw was regarded as frugal. Of his Denver station, it was remarked by Edwin James of Broadcasting that "McCaw's saving ways had been reflected in the station's programming"; in the 1950s, he owned WINS in New York and was an aggressive cost-cutter there. Local programs from KTVW during its 20-year run included a movie block hosted by Stu Martin; the afternoon children's show Penny and Her Pals, hosted by LeMoyne Hreha; and, for one year, coverage of the Seafair hydroplane races. In 1967, when an engineer's strike kept most of the other Seattle stations from broadcasting the event, KTVW stepped in to fill the void on short notice. Also in 1967, channel 13 began airing a six-hour stock market show, the first such program to broadcast on a VHF station. It originated, unlike KTVW's other programming, from Seattle in studios in the Northern Life Tower. These shows, along with most of channel 13's local programming, were temporarily suspended at the end of March 1970 as part of cutbacks it attributed to "the economic slowdown". The cutbacks left Bob Corcoran, a talk show host, as KTVW's sole on-air personality. KTVW was left airing, in the words of the television editor of The Seattle Times, "scratchy old movies and ... Neanderthal reruns from the violence-action era of television". The business news programming briefly left the air that April before closing for good at the end of October 1970 along with the Northern Life Tower studio in Seattle.

In early 1969, plans were floated to convert KTVW to color, move the transmitter to Port Orchard, and relocate the studios to Seattle. The television editor of the Seattle Post-Intelligencer hailed the proposed changes as heralding the end of "the funny station way over at the end of your television dial ... with the fuzzy picture and the funny, fuzzy programs and the fuzzy, old, awful movies". However, any hopes of an upgrade were dashed when McCaw died of a stroke that August. His indebted businesses struggled after his death; creditors made more than $12 million (equivalent to $76.7 million in 2025) in claims, after which the bank declared his estate insolvent, requiring the family to sell off his various holdings, including the family mansion and yachts.

=== Blaidon ownership, financial woes, and the end of KTVW ===
After nearly three years, on March 27, 1972, McCaw's estate sold KTVW to the Seattle-based Blaidon Mutual Investors Corporation, named for co-owners Blaine Sampson and Don Wolfstone, for $1.1 million (equivalent to $6.41 million in 2025). During the sale process, the stock market program—which had returned in 1971 after it reorganized under a new production company—stopped airing after channel 13 asked for more money for its air time in contract negotiations.

Wolfstone recognized that the station needed help if it were to become viable, telling a writer for the Seattle Post-Intelligencer that "there's not much of a worse [station] in the country". Blaidon tried to turn KTVW around by boosting the station's signal strength, acquiring first-run syndicated programming, and installing color-capable broadcast equipment (the station had broadcast exclusively in black-and-white until Blaidon bought it). Channel 13 premiered its new programming lineup with The Tony Visco Show, its flagship effort. This talk/entertainment show was hosted by Tony Visco, a Las Vegas lounge entertainer and singer, and attempted to recreate a Tonight Show-style program. Don Wolfstone—the "Don" in "Blaidon"—brought in a Los Angeles producer/director to develop the show, which featured a live band on-set, and had hopes of flying in show-business guests from Los Angeles and later syndicating the program nationwide. After two months on-air, rising production costs forced Blaidon to relocate the program from a Tacoma restaurant to the station's studios; channel 13 canceled The Tony Visco Show before the year ended. Another new program launched under Blaidon was an afternoon cartoon show hosted by local actor Mike Lynch, playing a "superhero" character for whom viewers were asked to suggest a name; the winning entry was "Flash Blaidon". Despite KTVW's improved programming and ratings that at times were competitive with KTNT-TV, national advertisers failed to materialize. The News Tribune described the station, in retrospect, as "a down-at-the-heels purveyor of old movies and used-car commercials".

[KTVW] used to be worse than no TV at all, so we pretended it wasn't there.

— By Fish, in a 1974 column in The Seattle Times

At the end of 1973, Blaidon filed to sell channel 13 to the Christian Broadcasting Network (CBN) of Portsmouth, Virginia; the filing alone signaled trouble, given that at the time, the FCC barred selling a station in less than three years of ownership unless the buyer demonstrated it was facing financial hardship. The station's remaining live programming, such as Flash Blaidon, was canceled. Over the course of 1974, KTVW's financial position deteriorated. On January 15, 40 employees staged a walk-out, forcing the station to go off the air, complaining about not having been paid in nearly four weeks. After they were paid by cashier's check, channel 13 resumed operations the next day, but employees remained skeptical of Blaidon's financial condition. By the end of January, Blaidon had pleaded with the FCC to expedite approval of the CBN transfer; Wolfstone expected the Internal Revenue Service to lock up his Seattle office for failing to pay withholding taxes in the second half of 1973.

The FCC approved the CBN transaction, but the buyer had second thoughts about the $5.1 million (equivalent to $25.9 million in 2025) purchase price of channel 13 and asked for several time extensions to consummate the purchase. In July, MCA Television, among KTVW's largest creditors, successfully petitioned for the appointment of a receiver to manage the station's affairs. Despite a brief improvement in financial position when the receiver separated KTVW from Blaidon, the CBN sale fell apart over its refusal to assume all of the television station's liabilities. The bankruptcy court approved a second offer from the Suburban Broadcasting Company, which owned WSNL in Patchogue, New York, but this deal collapsed, as Suburban also refused to assume the station's liabilities. On December 12, 1974, at 5:10 p.m., KTVW was airing a rerun of Batman when Bruce Clements, a court-appointed trustee in charge of its affairs, ordered the station to go off the air at 5:30 upon that program completing its airing.

By the end of January 1975, the bankruptcy court was entertaining two "very firm offers" for the station. In 1976, the U.S. Securities and Exchange Commission sued Blaidon, alleging that they had sold stock to non-Washington residents without SEC approval and issued misleading financial reports to prospective investors in the company.

=== KCPQ: The Clover Park years ===
When the bankruptcy court revealed the identity of the winning bidder for channel 13's transmission site—the studio equipment having been sold at a sheriff's sale—the local television community was shocked to learn that the buyer would be the Clover Park School District. Clover Park had operated KPEC-TV, an educational station on ultra high frequency (UHF) channel 56, since April 1960; it was one of the South Sound's two educational TV stations, alongside KTPS-TV (channel 62), owned by Tacoma Public Schools. By 1975, KPEC-TV's UHF equipment, which had been in service for more than a decade, was aging and needed replacement. It was more cost-effective to replace the channel 56 physical plant with KTVW, a high-power VHF station that could reach more western Washington homes and schools. A booster group for KTPS, the fledgling Trinity Broadcasting Network (TBN), and a commercial group headed by Stan Naccarato, manager of the Tacoma Twins, also bid.

Clover Park won the station for a final cost of $378,000 (equivalent to $1.66 million in 2025), with KSTW (the former KTNT-TV) owner Gaylord Broadcasting providing $250,000 of that total in what was viewed as a move to make KSTW the only independent in the market. Transmitter testing took place in November 1975, with channel 13 repeating the KPEC-TV signal; eventually, a new microwave link would be used to feed programming from channel 56's existing studios to the channel 13 transmitter near Ruston. The call letters were changed to KCPQ-TV and the license modified to noncommercial before channel 13 returned to the air on January 4, 1976; the microwave link was not ready, so KPEC-TV remained in service until it was. The new KCPQ also aired some programming produced by KTPS.

Programming in the Clover Park era, which included PBS material, represented a continuation of KPEC-TV's former service and originated from its existing Lakewood studios. The transmitter upgrade also attracted a high-profile name: Jim Harriott, who had been the highest-paid anchor in local TV news at KING-TV and who took a pay cut to come to channel 13 and helm public affairs programming. Harriott soon left when KIRO-TV offered him a job.

=== From Clover Park to Kelly ===
KPEC-TV had turned a profit prior to the channel 13 move, a rarity among educational TV stations. Two simultaneous events in 1978 prompted the district to reconsider its ownership of a television station. The Washington State Legislature—which KPEC-TV and later KCPQ covered for the state's public television stations—approved plans to fully fund basic education at the state level, which would change channel 13 into a financial drain on the school system. For instance, Clover Park would stop receiving $3.5 million a year in federal funds for educating military dependents; this money would instead go to the state, making the $600,000 in annual station maintenance costs (equivalent to $2.32 million in 2025) a "luxury". Meanwhile, portions of Clover Park High School were condemned, but voters rejected four separate bond initiatives that would have funded the reconstruction of the high school and taken students out of portable classrooms. The school board stated that annual losses from operating KCPQ reached $500,000.

In late 1978, the Clover Park School District received a $6 million offer from two investors from Tucson, Arizona: Gene Adelstein and Edward Berger, owners of that city's independent KZAZ-TV. Adelstein and Berger were looking to expand; already in the early stages of a bid to build a new station in Albuquerque, New Mexico, the pair saw the Seattle–Tacoma market as having recovered from the market conditions that claimed KTVW four years prior and as being overserved by educational stations. They also felt that the Tacoma area alone represented a market of similar size to Tucson. Channel 13 then attracted another buyer who topped the Adelstein–Berger bid. In January 1979, the school board accepted an offer from Kelly Broadcasting, owners of KCRA-TV in Sacramento, California, to buy KCPQ from the Clover Park School District for $6.25 million (equivalent to $22.3 million in 2025). This purchase price was financed by Kelly Broadcasting's sale, earlier that year, of two radio stations in Sacramento.

The sale was met with stiff protests and a petition to deny led by members of the station's advisory board, organized as "Save our Station 13". After the approval of a settlement between this group and Kelly that included a $450,000 gift (equivalent to $1.47 million in 2025) from the buyer for public television and the donation of the Ruston tower to KTPS, KCPQ ceased educational broadcasting on February 29, 1980, and the station went silent for a major technical overhaul. While KCPQ would continue to use Clover Park's studio space, the transmitter was relocated to Gold Mountain, a peak located west of Bremerton, where the station erected a new tower; this enabled channel 13 to increase its signal footprint across western Washington.

After more than eight months and several delays, KCPQ returned to the air—and to commercial operation as the Seattle market's second independent station—on November 4, 1980, when it adopted the Q13 moniker (it was also called "The New 13" early on); on opening night, it counterprogrammed election returns on the network affiliates with the movie The Deer Hunter. Channel 13 represented a challenge that brought Bob Kelly, who with his brother had owned KCRA, out of semiretirement; disenchanted with network television, he had turned his attention to other Kelly family ventures. Among the new KCPQ's launch programs were a nightly 8 p.m. movie, game shows, and a local children's show, Captain Sea-Tac. John Komen, a political reporter, was the only holdover from the public station's programming.

KCPQ grew quickly in its first five years. What started as a station heavy on movies and branded as "The Northwest Movie Channel" expanded to include college sports (including Washington and Washington State football) and, for a time, a full local newscast. When KSTW opted not to join the new Fox network in 1986, the affiliation went to KCPQ that June ahead of its launch on October 9; of the first 79 stations to affiliate with Fox, it was among the 13 on the VHF dial. In February 1990, KCPQ signed a three-year deal with Buena Vista Television to carry The Disney Afternoon, spurning Fox's own children's lineup which launched that fall. This led to a threat from Fox to strip KCPQ of its affiliation if it did not commit to running Fox Kids in sequence beginning in 1992, as well as an antitrust lawsuit between Buena Vista and Fox, which Buena Vista alleged was coercing affiliates to air its children's programming in a restraint of trade. Fox ultimately relented on its pressure, but KCPQ dropped the Disney Afternoon block in the fall of 1993.

=== Later Kelly ownership and sale to Tribune ===
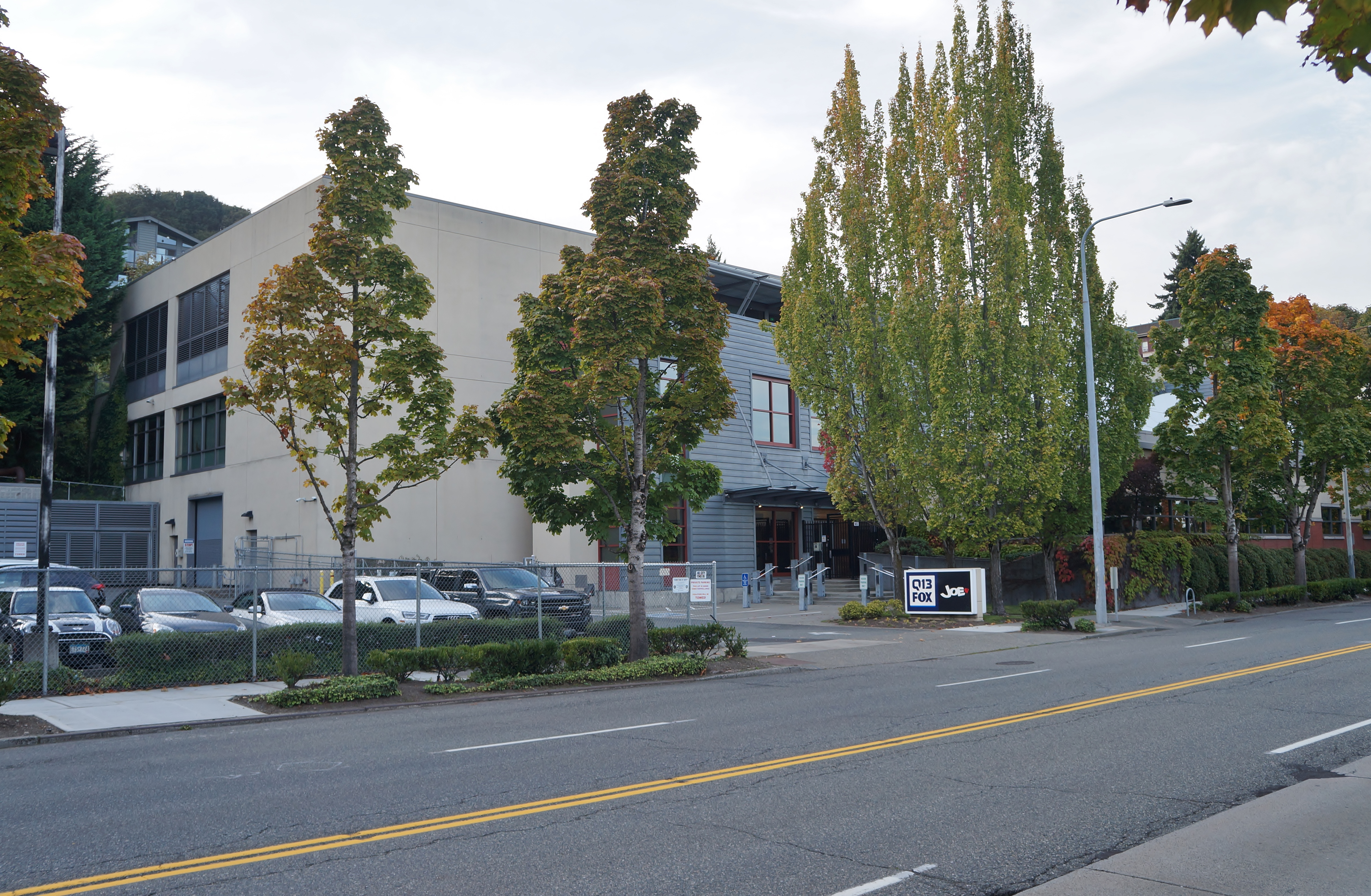
The former KCPQ and KZJO studios on Westlake Avenue

The second half of the 1990s was a time of major changes at channel 13. In 1995, Kelly Broadcasting bought the former Vernell's Candy factory on Westlake Avenue along Lake Union in Seattle to house KCPQ's operations. The three-story building was renovated and expanded to 66,462 square feet (6,175 m^{2}) for the television studio. Even though Bob Kelly lived in Tacoma, the company made the decision to move out of the South Sound and into a space more than twice the size of the prior studio and closer to the bulk of market activity. On September 13, 1997, KCPQ moved its studios to the new, $30 million Seattle facility, retaining only a small sales office in the city of license of Tacoma. This marked the end of television broadcasting from the Clover Park studios after more than 20 years on channel 13 and more than 35 since the founding of KPEC-TV.

There were also changes in ownership. In 1997, Kelly Broadcasting experienced an internal changing of the guard, as Bob Kelly and his son Chris sold their stakes in Kelly to family members Jon and Greg Kelly and KCPQ general manager Roger Ottenbach. Not long after, the family company decided to exit an increasingly consolidated television business. In August 1998, Kelly Broadcasting announced the sale of its Sacramento television business to Hearst-Argyle Television; the next day, it sold KCPQ to the Meredith Corporation, which immediately traded it to the Tribune Company in exchange for Tribune's Atlanta station, WGNX. The swap made sense for both companies; WGNX was the only CBS affiliate owned by Tribune, whose portfolio otherwise consisted of Fox and The WB affiliates, while Meredith owned several CBS outlets in top-25 markets. Meanwhile, Hearst had been interested in KCPQ but could not, under newspaper-broadcast cross-ownership limits, own that station and the Seattle Post-Intelligencer. Following the purchase of channel 13, Tribune merged KCPQ's operations with those of KTWB-TV (channel 22, now KZJO), which Tribune had acquired the year prior; the two stations became co-owned in 1999, after the FCC began to allow same-market duopolies.

On August 1, 2001, KCPQ began digital broadcasting on channel 18. KCPQ shut down its analog signal, over VHF channel 13, on June 12, 2009, as part of the federally mandated transition from analog to digital television. The station's digital signal relocated from its pre-transition UHF channel 18 to VHF channel 13 for post-transition operations.

=== Fox seeks a station in Seattle ===
The final Q13 logo, used from 2020 to 2021

The size of the Seattle market and its status as an NFL football city led Fox to covet owning a station there. By 1997, it had already made two rejected offers to buy KCPQ.

KCPQ first came in danger of losing its Fox affiliation in February 1997, when Fox Television Stations was reported to be in negotiations to acquire then-UPN affiliate KIRO-TV from Belo Corporation. Belo had just acquired the Providence Journal Company and KING-TV, requiring it to dispose of KIRO. Fox was reportedly dissatisfied with KCPQ, which was described by one observer as being "recalcitrant". The trade with Belo never materialized; KIRO was ultimately sold to Cox Broadcasting. The Seattle Seahawks moved in 2002 from the American Football Conference to the National Football Conference, to which Fox holds the rights for most games. In June 2014, Fox reached a deal with Cox to trade its stations in Boston and Memphis for Cox's Fox affiliate, KTVU, and associated independent KICU-TV in San Francisco; Fox was also reportedly considering a deal to acquire KIRO, which would have displaced the Fox affiliation from KCPQ. In 2013, Fox had made a similar move in Charlotte, North Carolina (home market of the Carolina Panthers), exercising an option to buy WJZY and move its affiliation there.

In September 2014, the New York Post reported that Fox was planning to acquire KCPQ from Tribune in exchange for its Chicago MyNetworkTV station WPWR-TV—which would have created a duopoly with WGN-TV in that city. On September 23, Tribune revealed that Fox had sent a notice terminating its affiliation with KCPQ effective January 17, 2015; in a statement, Tribune noted that discussions between the two companies were still ongoing. Days earlier, on September 19, Fox had struck a deal to buy KBCB, a station in Bellingham, for $10 million; the purchase, submitted for FCC approval on October 3, was described as a "strategic option" for Fox by an insider. Naming KBCB as Fox's Seattle affiliate would have had immediate complications for Fox's distribution in the market, as the Bellingham station provides a marginal signal to Seattle proper. By the time the KBCB purchase was disclosed, talks between Tribune and Fox had deteriorated; a Wall Street Journal report on October 7 stated that Fox no longer planned to include WPWR in a potential swap for KCPQ.

Fox announced on October 17, 2014, that Tribune had agreed to extend its affiliation agreement for KCPQ through July 2018 and pay increased reverse compensation fees to Fox for the broadcasting of its programming beginning in January 2015. Shortly thereafter, Fox's purchase of KBCB was abandoned and was dismissed by the FCC on November 20, 2014.

=== Sinclair sale attempt; acquisition by Nexstar and Fox ===
Tribune Media agreed to be sold to Sinclair Broadcast Group on May 8, 2017, for $3.9 billion and the assumption of $2.9 billion in debt held by Tribune. As Sinclair already owned KOMO-TV and KUNS-TV, KCPQ was among 23 stations identified for divestment in order to meet regulatory compliance for the merger. Sinclair agreed to purchase KZJO and sell KCPQ to Fox Television Stations as part of a $910 million deal; Howard Stirk Holdings additionally agreed to purchase KUNS-TV. Lead FCC commissioner Ajit Pai publicly rejected the deal in July 2018 after details of Sinclair's proposed divestitures came to light; weeks later, Tribune terminated the merger agreement with Sinclair, nullifying both transactions.

Tribune Media agreed to be acquired by Nexstar Media Group for $6.9 billion in cash and debt on December 3, 2018. Following the merger's completion on September 19, 2019, Fox Television Stations purchased KCPQ and KZJO as part of a $350 million deal, with Fox citing KCPQ's status as the broadcaster of most Seahawks home games as the impetus for the transaction. The sale was completed on March 2, 2020. After its acquisition by Fox, KCPQ dropped the Q13 moniker and rebranded to "Fox 13" on September 26, 2021, conforming with the branding of other Fox-owned stations.

Fox announced on December 18, 2025, that KCPQ would move in 2026 to a 27,167-square-foot (2,524 m^{2}) studio on the second floor of the Axis9 office building in the Denny Triangle neighborhood of downtown Seattle. The existing studio campus had been sold to Allstate Insurance in 2016 for $19.5 million and leased back for a ten-year period.

== Local programming ==
=== Newscasts ===
The first local news service on channel 13 operated when the station was KMO-TV in 1953; the next time channel 13 attempted a regular local newscast was in 1981, when the station aired regular news updates, expanding briefly by running a half-hour 10 p.m. newscast by the mid-1980s. This news operation could not compete with the more established 10 p.m. news on then-independent KSTW and was axed in June 1986 as part of economic cutbacks by the station.

In 1991, KIRO-TV pitched KCPQ management on the idea of producing a 10 p.m. newscast for the station; channel 13 "wasn't ready" for the venture, per KIRO-TV news director John Lippman, and KTZZ aired it instead, lasting until 1993. By 1997—as the Fox network had added a national news service and more of its affiliated stations were adding newscasts, and after KCPQ had relocated to the larger Seattle studios—KCPQ began planning to start up a newscast of its own. As a potential stopgap, KCPQ considered airing a 10 p.m. newscast from KIRO-TV, which at that time was preparing to switch back from UPN to CBS and was shopping the 10 p.m. hour to other local stations. While KCPQ reached an initial agreement to air the KIRO newscast for three years, minutes from signing the contract, an impasse was reached over a "deep philosophical issue": the length of the contract, because KCPQ wanted a term of no more than 18 months before it would start up its own newscast.

After no agreement could be reached with KIRO, Kelly decided to re-launch the station's news division (and newscast) independently and hired Todd Mokhtari, producer of KCRA-TV's morning and evening newscasts, to be the news director for a new 10 p.m. newscast. Q13 Reports began airing on January 18, 1998, initially running as a half-hour from Sunday to Thursday nights; the broadcast debuted without its lead anchor, Leslie Miller, a Canadian who was still awaiting a work permit and wound up not debuting until April. The station benefited from the decision of Paramount Stations Group to drop KSTW's competing newscast after 21 years on air in December 1998.

By early 1999, the station was beginning to contemplate an expansion into morning news. In January 2000, the morning show debuted, with Christine Chen—a former KSTW anchor who worked at KCPQ on a freelance basis for nearly a year—selected as its first anchor.

After adding a 9 p.m. newscast on KMYQ (now KZJO) in 2008, KCPQ expanded into early evening news in the 2010s with 4 and 5 p.m. programs added. A half-hour 11 p.m. newscast followed in 2014 when the revival of The Arsenio Hall Show was canceled. By 2021, KCPQ was producing 54 hours of locally produced newscasts weekly, with 11 hours each weekday. This was further expanded by the addition of a 6 p.m. news hour in January 2022. In April 2022, KCPQ relaunched its morning show as Good Day Seattle, adopting the Good Day title used by other Fox-owned stations.

In June 2025, KCPQ rebranded its newscasts, with the 4, 5, and 10 p.m. newscasts becoming Seattle News Tonight and the 6 p.m. news hour split between Washington News Wrap (focused on state headlines) and Washington Sports Wrap. The Seattle News Tonight branding also encompasses the 8 and 9 p.m. newscasts on KZJO. It was also announced that Good Day Seattle would add a 10 a.m. hour later in the year.

=== Non-news programming ===
The station produces a local program on law enforcement and crime news, The Spotlight with David Rose, which airs every Friday at 11 p.m. The program began production in 2008 as Washington's Most Wanted, a local version of America's Most Wanted.

KCPQ has two regular sports programs: the Sunday night Seattle Sports Live and the weeknight Washington Sports Wrap, the latter of which debuted in 2024.

KCPQ became the local broadcast partner of the Seattle Seahawks in 2012, airing preseason games and team features; KING-TV, which lost the partnership to KCPQ, regained it in 2022. In 2016, KCPQ and KZJO began broadcasting locally televised games of the Seattle Storm of the WNBA; initially starting with 15 home games on channel 22 in 2016, KZJO was slated to carry 29 games in the 2023 season plus six more on KCPQ. In 2023, KCPQ and KZJO entered into a content partnership with the Seattle Kraken hockey team which included a weekly show on the team, titled What's Kraken?.

Beginning in 2014, KCPQ and KZJO became the broadcast home for locally televised Seattle Sounders FC matches; while all the matches were carried on KZJO, KCPQ aired two specials on the team each year. All Major League Soccer local television rights agreements ended after 2022 to make way for MLS's 10-year deal with Apple, but the Sounders entered into a new deal for team-related programming in 2025. The Sounders's sister women's club, Seattle Reign FC, was included in the agreement, with 11 Reign matches to be televised on KCPQ in 2025.

In 2026, KCPQ acquired the broadcast rights to all Seafair "signature" events, including the Seafair Summer Fourth fireworks show and Seafair Cup.

=== Notable former on-air staff ===
- Peter Alexander — reporter and anchor
- Christine Chen — anchor
- Ron Corning — anchor
- Stanley Kramer — movie host (1980s)
- Don Poier — sports play-by-play (1980s)

== Technical information ==
=== Subchannels ===
KCPQ's main transmitter is on Gold Mountain in Bremerton. The station's signal is multiplexed:

Subchannels of KCPQ
Subchannel	Res.	Short name	Programming
13.1	720p	FOX13	Fox
13.2	480i	GRIT	Grit
13.3	480i	Mystery	Ion Mystery
13.4	480i	BUZZR	Buzzr
13.5	480i	Weather	Fox Weather
16.3	480i	ShopLC	Shop LC (KONG)

Broadcast on behalf of another station

KCPQ carries a subchannel belonging to KONG, one of Seattle's two ATSC 3.0 television stations. In exchange, KCPQ is carried in ATSC 3.0 on the KONG multiplex.

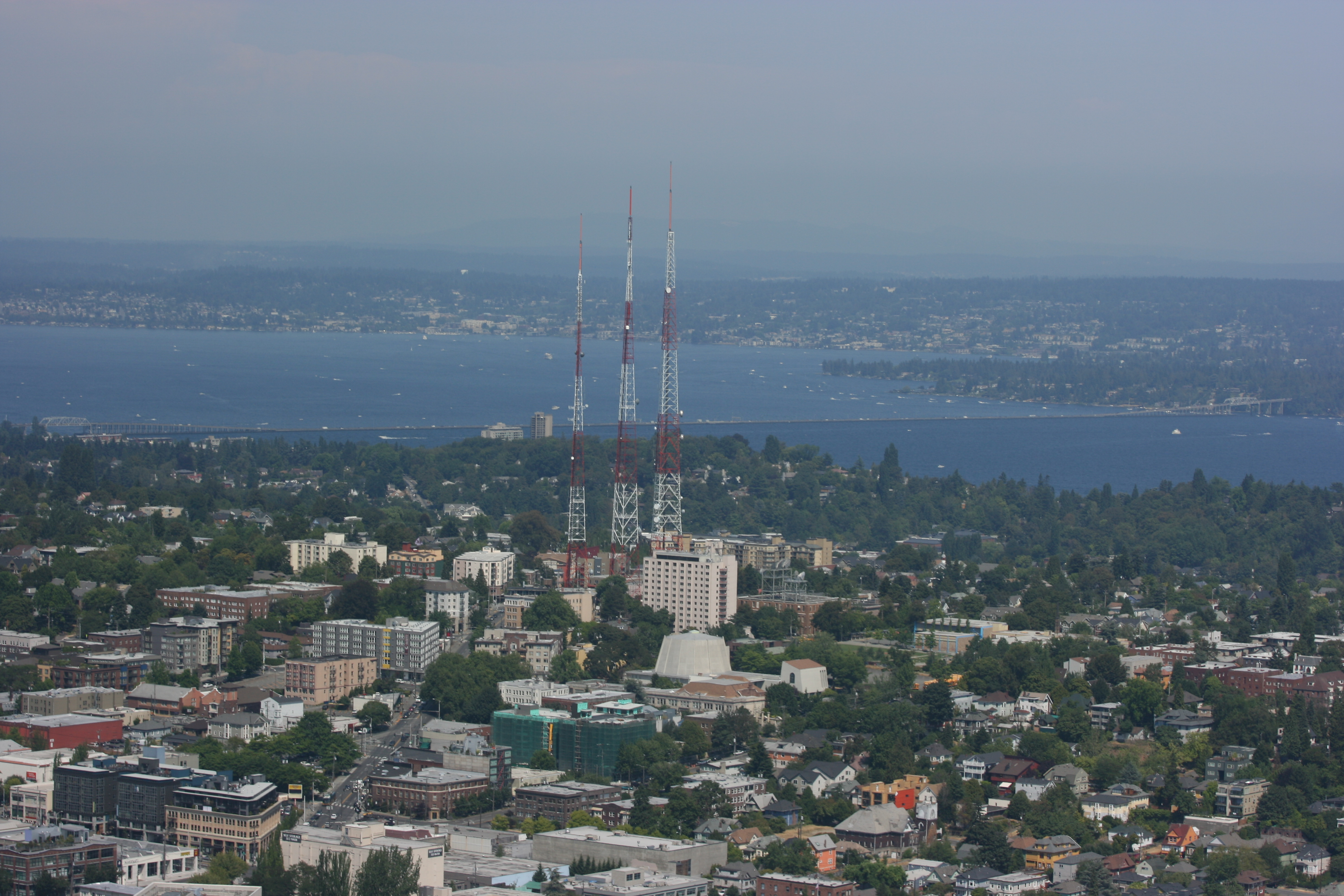
The rightmost of the three towers along East Madison Street, in Seattle's Capitol Hill neighborhood, broadcasts KZJO and KCPQ's digital replacement translator.

KCPQ's main channel is also simulcast on KZJO's transmitter as channel 22.2, which together with the digital replacement translator at that site makes the signal more accessible to viewers using UHF-only antennas and to viewers who receive a stronger signal from its transmitter in the Capitol Hill area.

=== Translators ===
KCPQ is rebroadcast on three translators outside of the Seattle metropolitan area as well as a digital replacement translator co-sited with KZJO in Seattle:

- Aberdeen: K25CG-D
- Centralia, Chehalis: K17NX-D
- Seattle: KCPQ (DRT) (RF 22)
- Wenatchee: K14BF-D
