= KPEC-TV =

Television station in Lakewood, Washington (1960–1976)

- Lakewood Center, Washington; United States
- Channels: Analog: 56 (UHF)

Programming
- Affiliations: NET (1960–1970); PBS (1970–1976)

Ownership
- Owner: Clover Park School District

History
- First air date: April 28, 1960
- Last air date: January 4, 1976

Technical information
- ERP: 21.4 kW
- HAAT: 64 m (210 ft)
- Transmitter coordinates: 47°10′31″N 122°29′37″W

KPEC-TV (channel 56) was an educational television station in Lakewood Center, Washington, United States. Owned by the Clover Park School District and operated in association with other nearby school systems, it was one of two educational television stations in Pierce County alongside KTPS-TV (channel 62). KPEC-TV operated from 1960 to 1976 and was replaced when the Clover Park School District acquired a bankrupt Tacoma station, KTVW (channel 13), and paired its own studio facilities with the channel 13 transmitter plant to launch KCPQ on January 4, 1976. Clover Park continued to operate that station until February 1980, when it was sold to private commercial interests.

== History ==
The Federal Communications Commission (FCC) allocated channel 56 for use as an educational station in Tacoma in 1952. Discussions of the use of this educational channel first took place in 1954. After applying that February, in October 1958, the school district received a construction permit to build a station on the channel, to be operated by the district's vocational-technical school, which already ran KCPS (90.9 FM). Construction continued through the course of 1959 as nine local school districts joined the consortium that would utilize the educational programs to be broadcast on channel 56.

In January 1960, KCPS moved into its new quarters in the purpose-built Radio-Television Center on Steilacoom Boulevard, which had been built on surplus Navy land. On the afternoon of April 28, county schools and homes with UHF converters saw the first program from KPEC-TV, Washington's second educational TV station, a kickoff followed by demonstrations in elementary school science and music; experimental programming for elementary schools continued until the end of the school year. When KPEC-TV began broadcasting again in the fall, it added high school courses, supported by a Ford Foundation grant, as well as evening programs from National Educational Television. Occasionally, programs produced by channel 56 were aired on KTNT-TV (channel 11), one of Tacoma's two commercial stations.

The progress made by the young educational station was almost wiped out. On August 6, 1963, an electrical short in lighting equipment caused a fire that raced through the studio, destroying the channel 56 transmitter, cameras, and six classrooms in the same building and causing paint to blister on the adjacent tower; four firefighters were injured battling the blaze. The fire caused $300,000 in damage, but with 20 school systems depending on programs from the educational station, rebuilding arrangements proceeded quickly. Within a week, a transmitter was on order, and arrangements were being made to use the FM radio studio, protected by a firewall from significant damage, to resume program production; KPEC-TV beat a self-imposed October 1 deadline to get back on the air with the aid of RCA and equipment loaned by other Tacoma and Seattle stations.

Channel 56's growth also included the connection of additional school districts to the station by the setup of translator stations in areas south and west of Lakewood. In 1962, school districts in Olympia joined the KPEC-TV educational consortium and constructed a booster to bring the signal further south. By 1964, 17 districts were participating in KPEC-TV's operations; it employed 30 staff, including nine teachers, and cost about $150,000 a year to operate. Further federal grants helped set up additional translators that, by 1967, had extended KPEC-TV programming as far south as Vancouver, serving some 150,000 students in more than 175 schools.

Throughout the station's history, KPEC-TV had upgraded its facilities by being savvy with equipment no longer needed elsewhere. When channel 56 was built, some of the equipment had been purchased from the failed KTRX at Kennewick. Channel 56 conducted its first live broadcast in 1970, of a forum on the construction of a new highway; the station's remote production truck, formerly a delivery van, was rebuilt three times using equipment discarded by Seattle's KIRO-TV and KOMO-TV. In one case, another station had ordered a videotape machine that fell off a forklift at the airport; when the station director, J. Albert Brevik, learned that it was to be written off, he acquired it and had it repaired. Some of that videotape equipment was of benefit to viewers far beyond Washington: by the early 1970s, PBS network programming was being recorded at Lakewood so that the tapes could be transported to KUAC-TV in Fairbanks, Alaska, that state's first public television station.

KPEC-TV also built itself into a station that punched above its weight in production. A series called Washington Alternatives, which was aired by all of the state's public television stations, was taped at KWSU-TV in Pullman but edited at channel 56. One KPEC-TV production, coverage of the Washington State Legislature during its sessions, also was distributed statewide. Two programs—Ducks or Docks, on the future of the Nisqually Delta, and What Happens to Me?, concerning the environmental impacts of the Tacoma smelter—were aired nationally; the latter was nominated for a national Emmy Award.

=== From 56 to 13 ===
For all of KPEC-TV's accomplishments, by the mid-1970s, channel 56 was approaching a crossroads. It needed to replace some of the 1963-vintage transmitter equipment. Further, because only KPEC-TV and KTPS were on the UHF band in Western Washington, Seattle-based KCTS still reached more homes than either of them. An unexpected solution, however, came in the form of trouble at another South Sound TV station.

In 1972, the Blaidon Mutual Insurance Corporation had acquired KTVW channel 13, one of the region's two commercial independent stations, from the estate of J. Elroy McCaw. Blaidon promptly found itself in financial trouble. In December 1973, it filed to sell the station to the Christian Broadcasting Network; while that sale awaited FCC action, employees walked out in January until they received their paychecks. Even though the FCC approved the deal, CBN balked at the high purchase price of the station and asked for more time to consummate the transaction. KTVW was placed into receivership in July at the request of creditor MCA Television. Though bankruptcy court approved a sale to the Suburban Broadcasting Corporation of Patchogue, New York, in November, the transaction broke down at the last minute due to the $1 million in liabilities that the buyer would have to assume, and the bankruptcy court ordered KTVW off the air on December 12, 1974.

They're getting the whole station for essentially what I'd have to pay for a couple of color cameras.

— Eric Bremner, general manager, KING-TV

The bankruptcy court received two offers for the station, and Clover Park was the surprise high bidder for the channel 13 broadcast facility (excluding studios). The final cost was a bargain: $212,000 (revised later to $378,000), with the $1 million of debt dissolved as part of settlements with creditors, some of whom bought back equipment in the KTVW studios at a sheriff's sale. That sum was similar to the cost of replacing the channel 56 transmitter, but it gave a much wider coverage area and strong regional VHF signal that the existing facility could not provide.

Transmitter testing took place in November 1975, with channel 13 repeating the KPEC-TV signal; eventually, a new microwave link would be used to feed the transmitter near Ruston. The newly-rechristened KCPQ became a noncommercial TV station, and the third PBS member station for the Seattle-Tacoma market, alongside KTPS and primary station KCTS. When KCPQ went on the air January 4, 1976, the microwave link was not ready, so KPEC-TV remained in service until it was; after that, KPEC-TV ceased operations. As channel 13, KTPS contributed some programming to the VHF station.

Clover Park continued to operate KCPQ, but two events in the late 1970s prompted it to reconsider owning a public television station. In 1978, Washington state approved plans to fully fund basic education at the state level, which would change channel 13 into a financial drain on the school system; meanwhile, portions of Clover Park High School were condemned, but voters rejected four separate bond initiatives that would have funded the reconstruction of the high school. Because KCPQ was operating noncommercially on an unreserved frequency, it could be converted back to commercial use. In December 1978, Gene Adelstein and Edward Berger, owners of KZAZ-TV in Tucson, Arizona, made a $6 million offer for channel 13. Another buyer showed up at the last minute with a bid that was $250,000 higher: Kelly Broadcasting of Sacramento, California, to whom the school board approved a sale at the start of 1979. The sale was met with stiff protests and a petition to deny led by members of the station's advisory board as "Save our Station 13". After the approval of a settlement between this group and Kelly that included a $450,000 gift from the buyer for public television and the donation of the Ruston tower to KTPS, KCPQ ceased educational broadcasting on February 29, 1980, and Kelly moved the transmitter site to Bremerton's Gold Mountain before returning KCPQ to commercial operation as an independent station on November 4; it is now a Fox owned-and-operated station.
