= Kelly Broadcasting =

Former broadcast holding company

- Formerly: Central Valley Broadcasting Company
- Industry: Broadcast holding company
- Founded: 1944; 82 years ago
- Defunct: 1999
- Fate: Stations acquired by Hearst-Argyle Television
- Successor: Hearst-Argyle Television
- Headquarters: Sacramento, California, United States
- Area served: Sacramento and Seattle
- Owner: Kelly and Hansen family

Kelly Broadcasting Company (also known as Kelly Broadcasting) was an American broadcast holding company that owned KCRA-TV and KQCA in Sacramento/Stockton. Kelly Broadcasting sold the stations (including the flagship station) to Hearst-Argyle Television in 1999.

== History ==
Kelly and Hansen family began founded in 1944 as Central Valley Broadcasting Company, with the launch of the Sacramento FM radio station KCRA-FM (now KYMX) in 1947. In 1955, it launched the television station KCRA-TV in Sacramento and purchased KCRA-AM (now KIFM), making it the pair of stations. It later purchased Seattle television station KCPQ from Clover Park School District, and became an independent station.

In 1994, KQCA entered a local marketing agreement with Kelly-owned KCRA-TV. In 1999, the Kelly television stations sold to New York City-based Hearst-Argyle Television.

== Stations ==
=== Television stations ===
City of license / Market	Station	Channel	Years owned	Current status
Sacramento/Stockton/Modesto, CA	KCRA-TV	3	1955–1999	NBC affiliate owned by Hearst Television
Sacramento/Stockton/Modesto, CA	KQCA	58	1994–1999 (Note: KQCA was owned by a privately held company but Kelly operated through a local marketing agreement.)	dual The CW/MyNetworkTV affiliate owned by Hearst Television
Seattle/Tacoma, WA	KCPQ	13	1980–1998	Fox owned-and-operated (O&O)
