= KWDK =

Television station in Tacoma, Washington

- Tacoma–Seattle, Washington; United States
- City: Tacoma, Washington
- Channels: Digital: 34 (UHF); Virtual: 56

Programming
- Affiliations: 56.1: Daystar; 56.2: Daystar Español; 56.3: SD simulcast of 56.1

Ownership
- Owner: Community Television Educators, Inc.; (Word of God Fellowship, Inc.); (Puget Sound Educational Television, Inc.)
- Sister stations: KYMU-LD

History
- First air date: September 6, 2000
- Former channel numbers: Analog: 56 (UHF, 2000–2006); Digital: 42 (UHF, until 2019)

Technical information
- Licensing authority: FCC
- Facility ID: 35419
- ERP: 123 kW
- HAAT: 695 m (2,280 ft)
- Transmitter coordinates: 47°30′16.3″N 121°58′10″W

Links
- Public license information: Public file; LMS
- Website: www.daystar.com

KWDK (channel 56) is a religious television station licensed to Tacoma, Washington, United States, broadcasting the Daystar Television Network to the Seattle area. The station is owned by Community Television Educators, Inc., a subsidiary of Daystar parent company Word of God Fellowship. KWDK's transmitter is located on West Tiger Mountain near Issaquah.

== History ==
On July 17, 1992, the Federal Communications Commission (FCC) issued a construction permit for channel 56 and call letters KWDK, to Christopher J. Racine. The license of the unbuilt station was sold to Puget Sound Educational TV, Inc. on October 6, 1999. KWDK signed on the air September 6, 2000, broadcasting the Daystar network.

KWDK was not the first station to broadcast on channel 56 in Tacoma. The Clover Park School District used the allocation to broadcast from Lakewood as public television station KPEC-TV from April 1960 to January 1976. It was effectively replaced when the school board purchased the transmitter facility and license of KTVW, a commercial station on VHF channel 13 in Tacoma, and moved its operation there as KCPQ in January 1976, shuttering the less powerful channel 56. The school board then sold the station in 1980, at which time it reverted to private commercial broadcasting.

On April 22, 2005, KWDK filed an application with the FCC for authorization to cease analog broadcasting and surrender its license for channel 56 prior to the end of the digital TV transition period, and thereafter operate KWDK-DT as a single channel, digital-only television station on channel 42. The FCC granted this authorization on July 20, 2005.

KWDK apparently ceased analog broadcasting on channel 56 sometime in April 2006. In August 2006, it was verified to be broadcasting on digital channel 42, making KWDK-DT the first digital-only broadcaster in the Seattle–Tacoma market, three years before all analog signals on full power TV stations were discontinued.

== Technical information ==
=== Subchannels ===
The station's signal is multiplexed:

Subchannels of KWDK
Subchannel	Res.	Short name	Programming
56.1	1080i	KWDK-DT	Daystar
56.2	720p	KWDK-ES	Daystar Español
56.3	480i	KWDK-SD	Daystar in SD

=== Analog-to-digital conversion ===
KWDK shut down its analog signal, over UHF channel 56, on June 12, 2009, as part of the federally mandated from analog to digital television. The station's digital signal remained on its pre-transition UHF channel 42, using virtual channel 56.
