= CW 58 =

CW 58 may refer to the following television stations in the U.S. affiliated with The CW:

== Current ==
- KQCA in Stockton–Sacramento, California
- WBKI in Salem, Indiana–Louisville, Kentucky

== Former ==
- KWBA-TV in Tucson–Sierra Vista, Arizona (2006–2024)
