= Channel 56 =

Channel 56 refers to several television stations:

== Canada ==
The following television stations operate on virtual channel 56 in Canada:

- CJEO-DT in Edmonton, Alberta

== See also ==
- Channel 56 virtual TV stations in the United States
