= KBCB =

Television station in Bellingham, Washington

- Bellingham–Seattle–Tacoma, Washington; United States
- City: Bellingham, Washington
- Channels: Digital: 19 (UHF); Virtual: 24

Programming
- Affiliations: 24.1: TCT; for others, see § Subchannels

Ownership
- Owner: Total Christian Television; (Radiant Life Ministries, Inc.)

History
- Founded: August 15, 1997
- Former call signs: KEGA (February–October 1989)
- Former channel numbers: Analog: 24 (UHF, 1997–2009)
- Former affiliations: ACN (1997–2004); ImaginAsian (2004–2006); ShopNBC/ShopHQ (2006–2015); Sonlife (2015–2021)
- Call sign meaning: British Columbia, Bellingham

Technical information
- Licensing authority: FCC
- Facility ID: 53586
- ERP: 208 kW
- HAAT: 757 m (2,484 ft)
- Transmitter coordinates: 48°40′45″N 122°50′36″W

Links
- Public license information: Public file; LMS
- Website: www.tct.tv

KBCB (channel 24) is a religious television station in Bellingham, Washington, United States, serving Northwest Washington and the Greater Vancouver and Seattle metropolitan areas. The station is owned by Total Christian Television (TCT). KBCB's transmitter is located near Mount Constitution on Orcas Island.

== History ==
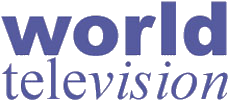
Logo used as World Television, used until 2006.

The construction permit was awarded as KEGA on February 10, 1989. It gained its current call sign on October 2, 1989.

From its sign-on on August 15, 1997, until 2006, KBCB aired a mix of independent/ImaginAsian programming targeted towards the Vancouver area and southwestern British Columbia, Canada, in addition to news from European international broadcasters until the early 2000s decade, bearing the name World Television to reflect the international mix of programming carried on the station. In 2006, the station converted to an affiliation with ShopNBC. The network became ShopHQ in 2013.

KBCB added the Estrella TV network as a multicast channel on August 1, 2011. KBCB's affiliation with Estrella ended on April 24, 2014.

=== Abandoned sale to Fox Television Stations ===
On September 19, 2014, Venture Technologies Group reached an agreement to sell the station to Fox Television Stations for $10 million; the purchase was submitted for Federal Communications Commission (FCC) approval on October 3. The purchase came amid speculation that Fox was interested in having an owned-and-operated station in the home market of the Seattle Seahawks football team, whose games primarily air on Fox as members of the National Football Conference. Fox had reportedly threatened to not renew KCPQ's affiliation when its affiliation agreement ended in January 2015, while the broadcaster had made similar transactions in other NFC markets, such as purchasing the network affiliate serving the San Francisco Bay Area, where the 49ers play, as well as a station in Charlotte, North Carolina, home to the Carolina Panthers.

On October 17, 2014, Fox announced that it had reached a deal to maintain its affiliation with KCPQ through July 2018—agreeing to a reverse compensation arrangement. Following this development, Fox's application to acquire KBCB was dismissed by the FCC on November 20, 2014. On March 3, 2020, Fox completed its purchase of KCPQ and sister station KZJO after coming to terms with the stations' new owner, Nexstar Media Group, which had acquired KCPQ via its purchase of Tribune Media.

On January 1, 2015, KBCB replaced its affiliation of ShopHQ with that of the Sonlife Broadcasting Network. In March, the SD simulcast on 24.2 was replaced by Jewelry TV. Home shopping channel QVC was added on subchannel 24.3 in July 2017. February 2018 saw home shopping retailer Evine (the legal successor to ShopNBC/ShopHQ) added to channel 24.2 and Jewelry TV moved to channel 24.4. Evine returned to its previous name, ShopHQ, on August 21, 2019. In September 2020, ShopHQ ceased airing and was replaced with a "This channel is available for lease" notification.

=== Sale to TCT ===
On February 8, 2021, Venture Technologies Group announced that it would sell KBCB to Marion, Illinois–based Total Christian Television for $7.74 million, including a $2 million cash donation. The sale was completed on April 30, and KBCB became the third station in the Seattle market to be owned and operated by a religious organization (alongside KTBW-TV and KWDK). Christian programming from TCT's satellite channel now broadcasts on channel 24.1 and Sonlife airs on subchannel 24.2, as a result. Having gone dark since the sale, channels 24.3 and 24.4 began transmitting again in March 2022, carrying Newsmax TV and Shop LC, respectively. Subchannel 24.5 was added at the same time, displaying a static message that a yet to be named channel is coming soon. Newsmax TV was dropped in December of the same year.

== Technical information ==
=== Subchannels ===
The station's signal is multiplexed:

Subchannels of KBCB
Subchannel	Res.	Short name	Programming
24.1	720p	KBCB HD	TCT
24.2	480i	SBN	SonLife (4:3)
24.3	480i	GDT	Infomercials
24.4	480i	ShopLC	Shop LC (4:3)
24.5	480i	BizTV	Biz TV (4:3)

=== Analog-to-digital conversion ===
KBCB shut down its analog signal, over UHF channel 24, on February 17, 2009, as part of the federally mandated transition from analog to digital television (which Congress had moved the previous month to June 12). The station's digital signal remained on its pre-transition UHF channel 19, using virtual channel 24.
