= KTRX (TV) =

Television station in Kennewick, Washington (1958)

Kennewick, Washington; United States
- Channels: Analog: 31 (UHF)

Programming
- Affiliations: Independent

Ownership
- Owner: Columbia River Television Company

History
- First air date: January 28, 1958
- Last air date: November 5, 1958; 281 days)

Technical information
- ERP: 8 kW
- HAAT: 2 m (5 ft)

KTRX (channel 31) was a television station in Kennewick, Washington, United States. It broadcast from January 28 to November 5, 1958, failing for financial reasons.

== History ==
In April 1957, the Columbia River Television Company, led by former KEPR-TV employee Stuart Nathanson and featuring other local investors, filed with the Federal Communications Commission (FCC) for a new construction permit to build a television station in Kennewick.

A construction permit was approved in early August 1957. Studios were arranged at the Black Angus Motel in Kennewick, and the call letters KTRX were chosen for the new venture, which also asked to build on channel 31 instead of 25. Unusually, the station would be an independent station, focusing on news and movies. Facility construction was completed by January 20, when the first test patterns went out, with full broadcasts starting January 28. The first day of programming featured four movies, two cartoon programs, and two 15-minute newscasts.

Rumors circulated by September that the station might be purchased by KXLY-TV in Spokane, based on KXLY loaning one of its sales managers to the Kennewick outlet. However, the financial dark clouds did not take long to circulate. In October, the Internal Revenue Service filed two tax liens seeking a combined $5,300 against Columbia River Television. On November 5, the station stopped broadcasting, and the president of Columbia River Television resigned. To Television Digest, one official cited equipment failure necessitating the purchase of a new transmitter and thus new investment on top of the existing financial problems. The stockholders in the company attempted to sell the station and identified a California man who was interested in purchasing it. However, this deal fell through within three weeks.

In December, eight employees filed to force the licensee into involuntary bankruptcy over $2,500 they were owed in back wages. The firm had debts of $139,000 against $59,000 in assets. Creditors met in late February and renewed attempts to sell the station by placing advertisements in national publications; if it could not be sold as a going unit, it would be parceled out for parts. By May, some of the equipment had been acquired by the Clover Park School District in Lakewood Center for use in starting an educational television station in the Tacoma area, and the transmitter tower was dismantled in November to be shipped across the state for use by the station, KPEC-TV. The KTRX license was canceled in late March 1960 at its request.
