= Bryan Monroe =

American journalist (1965–2021)

- Born: August 22, 1965; Munich, West Germany
- Died: January 13, 2021 (aged 55); Bethesda, Maryland, U.S.
- Education: University of Washington
- Occupations: Journalist; editor; academic
- Children: 2

Bryan Monroe (August 22, 1965 – January 13, 2021) was an American journalist and educator, who was the editor of CNNPolitics.com (2011–15). He was previously the vice president and editorial director of Ebony and Jet magazines at Johnson Publishing Co, and assistant vice president of news at Knight Ridder, where he helped to lead the team of journalists that won the 2006 Pulitzer Prize Gold Medal for Public Service for coverage of Hurricane Katrina. During his career, Monroe also had academic positions at Harvard University and Northwestern University's Medill School of Journalism, and from 2015, held the Verizon Chair at Temple University's Klein School of Media and Communication.

== Early years ==
Monroe was born in Munich, Germany, on August 22, 1965. His father, James W. Monroe, was a major general with the United States Army; his mother, Charlyne Monroe, worked as a teacher in Atlantic City. Monroe graduated from Clover Park High School in Lakewood, Washington. He went on to study communications at the University of Washington, obtaining a Bachelor of Arts in 1987. He was the first African-American editor of The Daily of the University of Washington. Monroe was a Nieman Fellow at Harvard University.

== Career ==
Monroe began his career as a photojournalist in the Pacific Northwest, interning at United Press International, Seattle Times and The Roanoke Times. He became the graphics editor and director of photography at the Myrtle Beach Sun News, and later served as deputy project director for Knight Ridder's 25/43 Project (1989). Monroe was deputy managing editor at Knight Ridder's San Jose Mercury News (1991–2002) and was later named assistant vice president of news at Knight Ridder, where he was responsible for half of the group's 32 newsrooms, until it was sold in 2006 to McClatchy. While there, he helped lead the team of journalists at Knight Ridder and the Biloxi Sun Herald (Mississippi), who won the 2006 Pulitzer Prize for coverage of Hurricane Katrina.

Monroe joined Johnson Publishing Company in 2006 as the vice president and editorial director of Ebony and Jet magazines. During his tenure there, he conducted the last major interview with Michael Jackson before his death. He also carried out the first interview with president-elect Barack Obama one week after he was elected president in November 2008. He joined CNN Digital as the editor of CNNPolitics.com, based in the CNN Washington, D.C. bureau, in January 2011. There he was responsible for the digital side of CNN's political coverage until 2015. He was the 16th president of the National Association of Black Journalists (2005–2007).

In addition to his work as a journalist, Monroe was a Nieman fellow at Harvard University from 2002 to 2003. He was a visiting professor at Northwestern University's Medill School of Journalism from 2009 to 2010, teaching courses in journalism innovation, magazine editing and enterprise reporting. He left CNN in 2015 to hold the Verizon Chair at Temple University's Klein School of Media and Communication.

== Personal life ==
Monroe had two children, one of whom was a student at Temple University. At the time of his death, he was engaged to Abrielle Beaton Anderson, whom he met in 2017.

Monroe died of a heart attack on January 13, 2021, at his home in Bethesda, Maryland. He was 55.
