= Ropati Pitoitua =

American Samoan football player (born 1985)

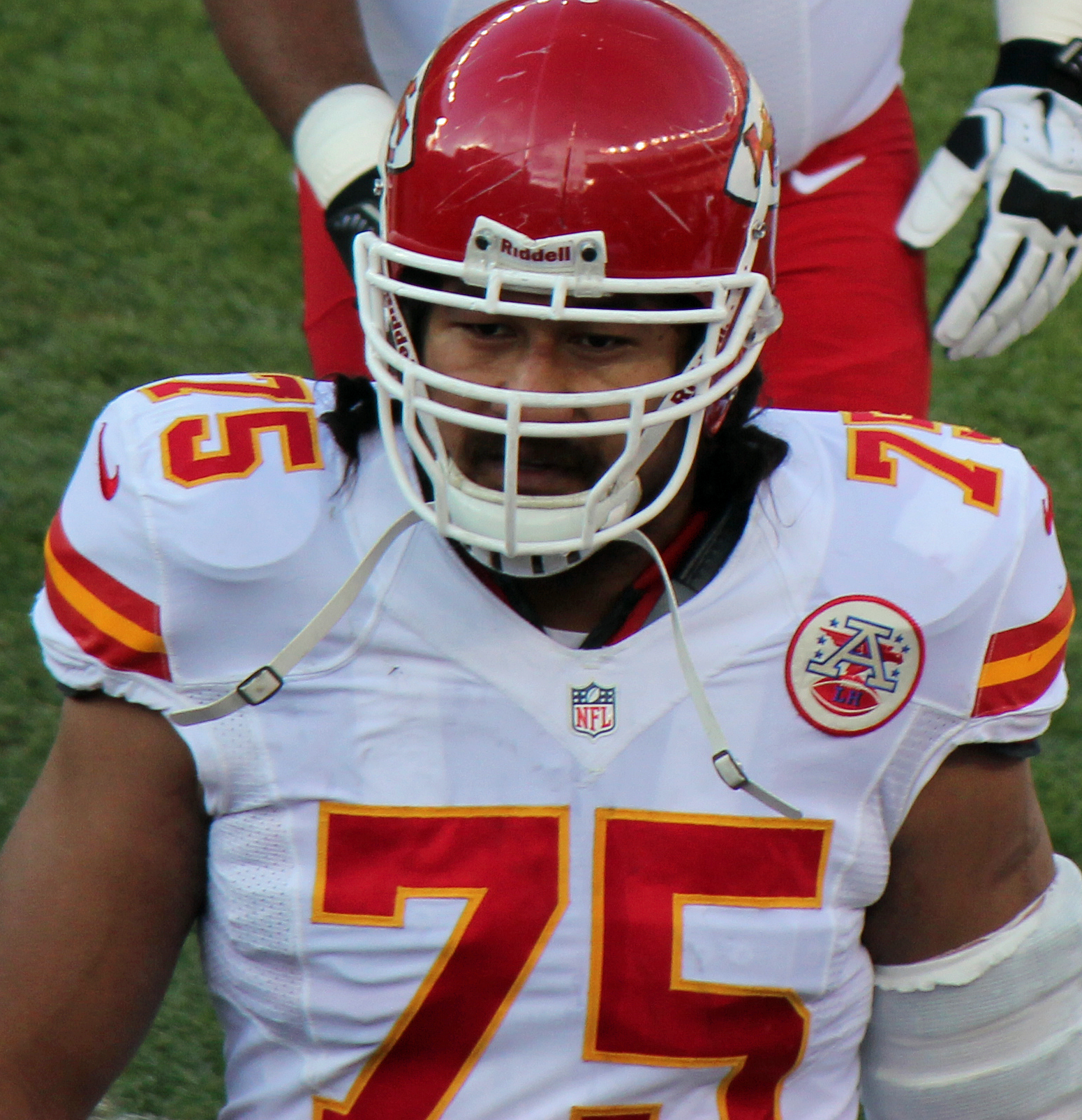
- Pitoitua with the Kansas City Chiefs in 2012

No. 79, 75, 92
- Position: Defensive end

Personal information
- Born: April 6, 1985 (age 41); Aua, American Samoa
- Listed height: 6 ft 8 in (2.03 m)
- Listed weight: 298 lb (135 kg)

Career information
- High school: Clover Park (Lakewood, Washington, U.S.)
- College: Washington State
- NFL draft: 2008: undrafted

Career history
- New York Jets (2008–2011); Kansas City Chiefs (2012); Tennessee Titans (2013–2015)

Career NFL statistics
- Total tackles: 149
- Sacks: 9.0
- Forced fumbles: 2
- Fumble recoveries: 1
- Stats at Pro Football Reference

Ropati Pitoitua (/roʊˈpɑːti pɪtəˈɪtwɑː/ roh-PAH-tee pit-ə-IT-wah; born April 6, 1985) is a former American football defensive end. He was signed by the New York Jets as an undrafted free agent in 2008. He played college football at Washington State. Pitoitua has also played for the Kansas City Chiefs and Tennessee Titans.

== Early life ==
Pitoitua was born in American Samoa to Sooalo Ropati and Faipine Pitoitua. He has 1 brother and 4 sisters. He played football and basketball at Clover Park High School in Lakewood, Washington, although he did not pick up football until his junior season. In 2002, he earned two football letters, in addition to being named the Seamount League Defensive Player of the Year.

== College career ==
He played in 36 games (25 starts), posting 116 tackles, (19 for losses) and 8.5 sacks in four seasons at Washington State and was named WSU's Leon Bender Award winner as Cougars' Defensive Lineman of the Year as senior when he started 11 games at defensive tackle and one at defensive end.

As a freshman in 2004 he played in 8 games with 4 starts and was named The Sporting News All-Pacific-10 freshman team after recording 24 tackles (5.5 for losses) and 5 sacks. In 2005, he played in 7 games with no starts after suffering a broken leg in fall camp and missed the first five games of the season, in limited duty he recorded 13 tackles (1 for a loss) and 1 sack. As a junior in 2006 he played in 9 games starting all 9 and recording 37 tackles (7.5 for losses) and 2.5 sacks. As a senior in 2007 he played in 12 games, starting all of them and made 40 tackles, 7 for losses and went without a sack.

== Professional career ==
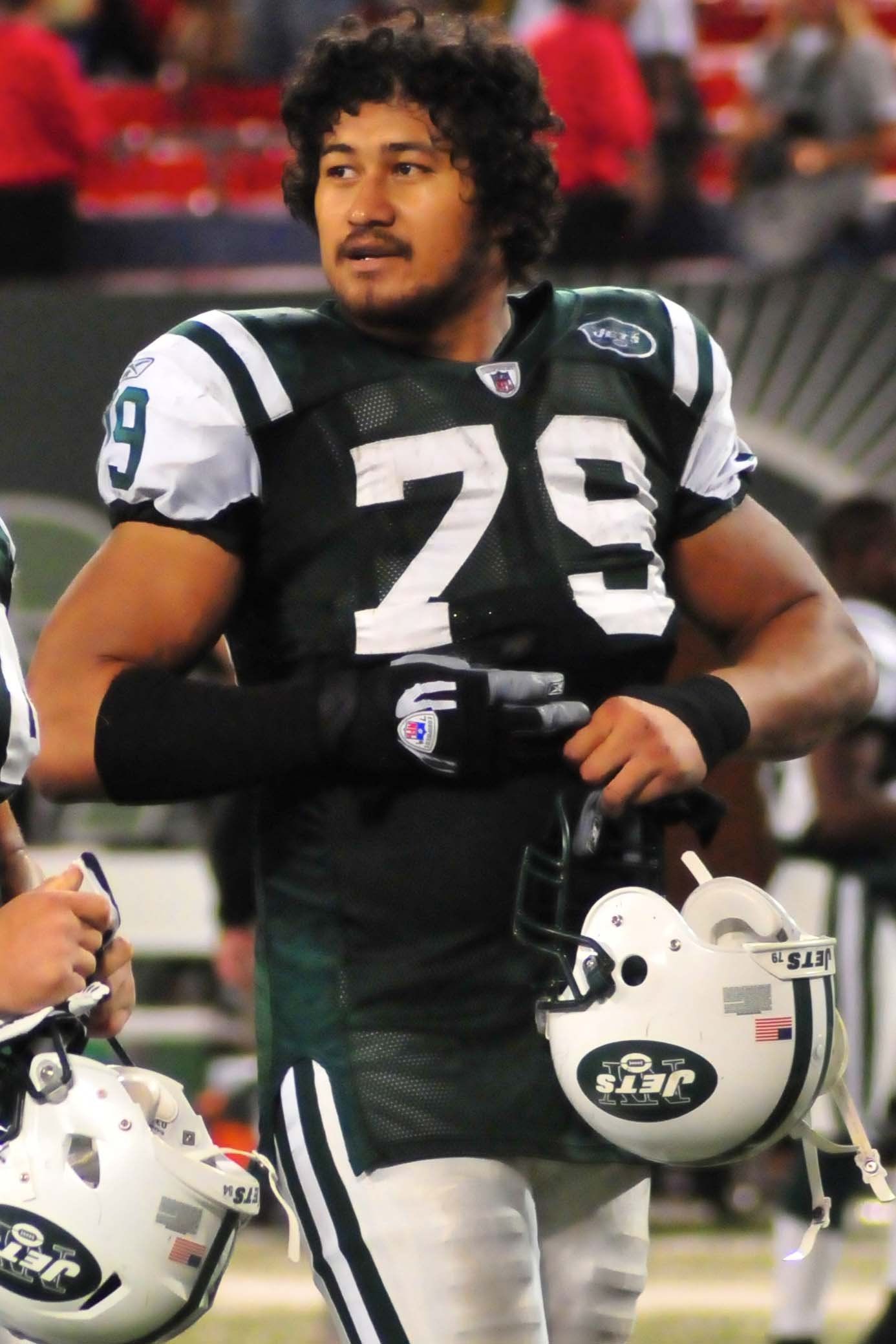
Pitoitua during his tenure with the Jets in 2009

=== New York Jets ===
He was signed by the Jets as an undrafted free agent in 2008 and spent the season on the team's practice squad. In 2009, Pitoitua posted three tackles in eight games. During the preseason in 2010, Pitoitua tore his Achilles tendon against the Carolina Panthers and was placed on the injured reserve list on August 23, 2010. Pitoitua was waived by the team on May 2, 2012.

=== Kansas City Chiefs ===
Pitoitua was signed by the Kansas City Chiefs on May 8, 2012.

=== Tennessee Titans ===
Pitoitua signed with the Tennessee Titans on March 25, 2013. Pitoitua and the Titans agreed to a new three-year contract on March 6, 2014. On August 28, 2016, Pitoitua was waived by the Titans.
