= Channel 56 virtual TV stations in the United States =

The following television stations operate on virtual channel 56 in the United States:

- K29GO-D in Cortez, etc., Colorado
- KDOC-TV in Anaheim, California
- KETK-TV in Jacksonville, Texas
- KQHO-LD in Houston, Texas
- KSXF-LD in Sioux Falls, South Dakota
- KWDK in Tacoma, Washington
- W24EC-D in Manteo, North Carolina
- WBXZ-LD in Buffalo, New York
- WDKY-TV in Danville, Kentucky
- WFSG in Panama City, Florida
- WLVI in Cambridge, Massachusetts
- WOLF-TV in Hazleton, Pennsylvania
- WOPX-TV in Melbourne, Florida
- WSPX-TV in Syracuse, New York
- WTVS in Detroit, Michigan
- WWVW-LD in Wheeling, West Virginia
- WYIN in Gary, Indiana
