= Sandi Gordon =

American soccer player (born 1963)

Personal information
- Full name: Sandra Kay Yotz
- Birth name: Sandra Kay Gordon
- Date of birth: March 25, 1963 (age 63)
- Place of birth: Pierce County, Washington, U.S.
- Height: 5 ft 6 in (1.68 m)
- Position: Defender

Senior career*
Years	Team	Apps	(Gls)
- Tacoma Cozars

International career
1987–1988	United States	7	(0)
- * Club domestic league appearances and goals

Sandra Kay Yotz (née Gordon; born March 25, 1963) is an American former soccer player who played as a defender, making seven appearances for the United States women's national team.

== Career ==
Gordon played club soccer for the Seattle Sounder-ettes from the mid-1970s through 1981. She then played for the Tacoma Cozars of Tacoma, Washington, which participated in the USASA National Women's Amateur in St. Louis in 1986. She was later selected to participate at the U.S. Olympic Festival in Raleigh, North Carolina in 1987.

Noticed by Anson Dorrance, Gordon was invited in 1987 to train in the U.S. national team camp in Blaine, Minnesota. She made her international debut for the United States on July 9, 1987 in the 1987 North America Cup against Sweden. With her appearance, she became the first black player to be capped to the U.S. women's national team. In total, she made seven appearances for the U.S., earning her final cap on July 29, 1988 in a friendly match against France.

== Personal life ==
Gordon was born in Pierce County, Washington to Marianne (née Enderle) and Albert Curtis Gordon. The family moved around a lot during her childhood, eventually settling in Tacoma. She attended Clover Park High School in Lakewood, Washington, where she participated in track and field rather than soccer as there was not a girls' soccer team.

Gordon dealt with chronic fatigue syndrome in the 1980s.

== Career statistics ==
=== International ===
United States
Year	Apps	Goals
1987	6	0
1988	1	0
Total	7	0
