= Christine Chen =

American journalist

- Born: 1968 (age 57–58); San Francisco, California, U.S.
- Education: University of California, Berkeley (BA)
- Occupation: Journalist
- Notable credit(s): 10 Emmy Award nominations, 2 Emmy Award wins as a journalist from the National Academy of Television Arts and Sciences Northwest Region
- Title: Principal, Chen Communications
- Website: christinechenyoga.com

Christine L. Chen (born 1968) is an American journalist. She is an adjunct instructor in communications at the American Language Institute of New York University, and a regular blogger/contributor for The Huffington Post andYoga Journal.

Chen has been an anchor and reporter for several U.S. television news networks. She is a senior corporate communications executive, formerly running a marketing-communications-public relations agency in Seattle, Washington with clients such as Microsoft, World Vision, and Susan G. Komen.

Currently, Chen is an entrepreneur at Chen Communications, based in New York City, producing and tech webcasting for BlackBerry. She is also the creator of the blog Xbox Bride, an accounting of the social ramifications of wedding a non-video gamer with an avid gamer.

== Biography ==
The younger of two children born to Taiwanese American immigrants, she was born and raised in the San Francisco Bay Area. Her father was the first Asian Senior Vice President of Bank of America. She graduated from Miramonte High School in 1986, and went on to earn a Bachelor of Arts degree with a double major in English and mass communication in 1990 from the University of California, Berkeley.

She is married to Richard Velazquez, a nationally recognized leader in the Hispanic community and technology and business executive.

== Career ==
Chen's network television career has spanned CBS, UPN, Fox (Fox Broadcasting Company), and PBS (Public Broadcasting Service). Her career began as a writer and producer for the News Travel Network in 1990 after graduation from the University of California, Berkeley.

=== CBS ===
Chen's first break as a reporter and weather anchor occurred in 1991 in Great Falls, Montana for KRTV, a CBS affiliate. She worked in Great Falls for two years and during that time, she was selected by CBS News in New York to be part of an elite group of five journalists nationwide in the CBS Minority Correspondent Apprentice two-year program. This program resulted in her placement in Portland, Oregon for an assignment as a reporter for KOIN-TV, another CBS affiliate station.

Chen moved to Seattle, Washington in 1995 to accept a new position as a reporter and anchor for KSTW, a CBS and UPN affiliate station. In 1996, she received the National Academy of Television Arts and Sciences (NATAS) Northwest Chapter Emmy Award for Individual Achievement in the News Reporter category during their 34th annual ceremony.

In 1998, amid financial difficulties, KSTW announced that it was shutting down its news division and laying off all of its 62 employees, including Chen. Despite this, she received another Emmy award nomination in 1998.

=== Fox ===
With the shutdown of KSTW's news department, KCPQ-TV, a Fox affiliate, recruited Chen as a reporter in 1999. In 2000, KCPQ launched Mornings Live on Q, and Chen was promoted to anchor and served as the launch host. The show was later rebranded Q13 Fox News This Morning. In 2000, Chen was nominated for another Emmy by the NATAS Northwest Regional Chapter for Individual Achievement as News Anchor.

Chen was anchoring Q13 Fox News This Morning on September 11, 2001. During the World Trade Center tragedy in New York, she stayed on air throughout the ordeal, providing essential news coverage to a shaken public. This would lead to her second Emmy award. On June 15, 2002, Chen received the NATAS Northwest Chapter Emmy Award for Individual Achievement in the News Anchor category during their 39th annual ceremony for 2001.

Chen was nominated for an Emmy award each year from 2000 to 2006 for Individual Achievement in the News Anchor category for the NATAS Northwest Regional Chapter. She was nominated twice for an Emmy in 2006 during the 44th Annual NATAS Northwest Regional Award Ceremony, one nomination for Individual Achievement as a News Anchor, the second for On-Camera Talent - Program Host/Moderator. This was the last of her Emmy nominations, resulting in a total of 10 nominations and two wins since 1996.

In 2004, Chen moved to the anchor position for Q13 Fox News @ 10. That year, she was named to the list of top 40 under 40 business leaders by the Puget Sound Business Journal.

=== PBS ===
In 2006, the Obama campaign selected Chen to emcee his public campaign kickoff event for Seattle. In the same year, Chen announced that she was leaving Q13 Fox, and anchored the show for the last time on November 29, 2006. Some factors involved in her decision to leave were the desire to start her own venture and improve her lifestyle, and the need to travel frequently and care for her ailing mother.

In 2007, Chen launched a new business and personal finance show on KCTS, the PBS station in Seattle, called About the Money with Christine Chen, serving as the launch host and anchor.

=== Chen Communications ===
In 2007, Chen formed her own marketing communications consulting group, Chen Communications LLC. She offered media and communications consulting ranging from messaging strategy to public relations, corporate communications infrastructure to internal communications.

She has delivered keynote speeches on the topics of communications, media, business ownership and execution, as well as enabling personal and professional change through developing self-awareness. Some of her audiences have included the Chinese Chamber of Commerce and the U.S. Small Business Administration. She presented a combined session to the U.S. Small Business Administration and the Seattle Chamber of Commerce for the WNET (Women's Network for Entrepreneurial Training) on May 15, 2008, entitled "Networking 101: Leveraging Connections in Person and Online". On April 11, 2007, Chen served as Master of Ceremonies for the launch of the Washington State Quarter by Washington State Governor Chris Gregoire and United States Mint Director Ed Moy

Chen emceed the 2007 Induction Ceremony for the Asian Hall of Fame on April 26, 2007 at the Asian Resource Center in Seattle.

=== Commercial talent ===
Chen had a cameo role in the 2007 award-winning independent film Fortune Hunters, portrayed a newscaster Maureen Yandle in Lifetime movie An Upstanding Citizen, and played both city council person and monorail rider in the only Seattle-filmed episode of Frasier, "Frasier Crane Day". She also appeared in a scene in the documentary The King of Kong: a Fistful of Quarters.

Chen returned to doing sporadic commercial work after a 10-year hiatus. In 2015, she was cast as a sportscaster in a three-part Jack Link's Beef Jerky commercial series "Sasquatch in Training" alongside Boomer Esiason and Clay Matthews.
