= KKMO =

Radio station in Tacoma, Washington

Coordinates: 47°18′18.4″N 122°26′37.4″W

- Tacoma, Washington; United States
- Broadcast area: Seattle-Tacoma metropolitan area
- Frequency: 1360 kHz
- Branding: El Rey (The King)

Programming
- Format: Classic regional Mexican
- Affiliations: Seattle Mariners; Seattle Sounders FC

Ownership
- Owner: Sea Mar Community Health Centers, LLC

History
- First air date: 1922; 104 years ago
- Former call signs: KMO (1922–1983); KAMT (1983–1987); KKMO (1987–1997); KZTS (1997–1998)

Technical information
- Licensing authority: FCC
- Facility ID: 33301
- Class: B
- Power: 5,000 watts

Links
- Public license information: Public file; LMS
- Webcast: Listen live
- Website: www.elrey1360seattle.com

KKMO (1360 kHz; "El Rey") is a commercial AM radio station in Tacoma, Washington. It is owned by Sea Mar Community Health Centers, LLC, and it airs a classic regional Mexican radio format.

KKMO transmits with 5,000 watts, using a non-directional antenna from its transmitter location on Browns Point, near Puget Sound in Tacoma.

== Programming ==
KKMO airs a classic regional Mexican music format branded as "El Rey". Notable on-air personalities include nationally syndicated host Eddie "Piolin" Sotelo in morning drive time. Local hosts are heard the rest of the day.

KKMO is the flagship Spanish broadcaster for the Seattle Mariners baseball team and the Seattle Sounders FC soccer team.

== History ==
KKMO is one of the oldest stations in Washington. It signed on the air in 1922. In the 1930s, it had studios in Hotel Winthrop and was powered at only 250 watts. This station used the three-letter call sign KMO from 1922 to 1983. Those letters were randomly assigned.

Because it came on the air before Class A clear channel station KMOX in St. Louis, Missouri, it prevented that CBS-owned station from taking a "preferred" call sign that would have represented the abbreviation for the word "Missouri". The KMO call letters would sometimes create confusion between KMO and Seattle's KOMO around the Seattle-Tacoma radio market.

On May 25, 1932, the Federal Communications Commission authorized KMO to go from limited-time to full-time operation along with changes in frequency and power. The station had been on 860 kHz with 500 watts of power. It changed to 1330 kHz with 250 watts of power but it could also broadcast around the clock.

The station switched to the call sign KKMO from 1987 to 1997. It returned to KKMO on July 20, 1998.

On April 30, 2008, Salem Communications announced that it had reached an agreement to sell KKMO to Tron Do-run Intelli LLC for $3,690,000. The deal was approved by the Federal Communications Commission (FCC) on June 25, 2008. But in November 2008, Salem announced that the sale had been cancelled. It was later acquired by the Sea Mar Community Health Centers.

In November 2008, the station dropped its "Radio Sol" branding in favor of "El Rey".

== See also ==
- List of initial AM-band station grants in the United States
