= KQCA =

Television station in Stockton, California

ATSC 3.0 station

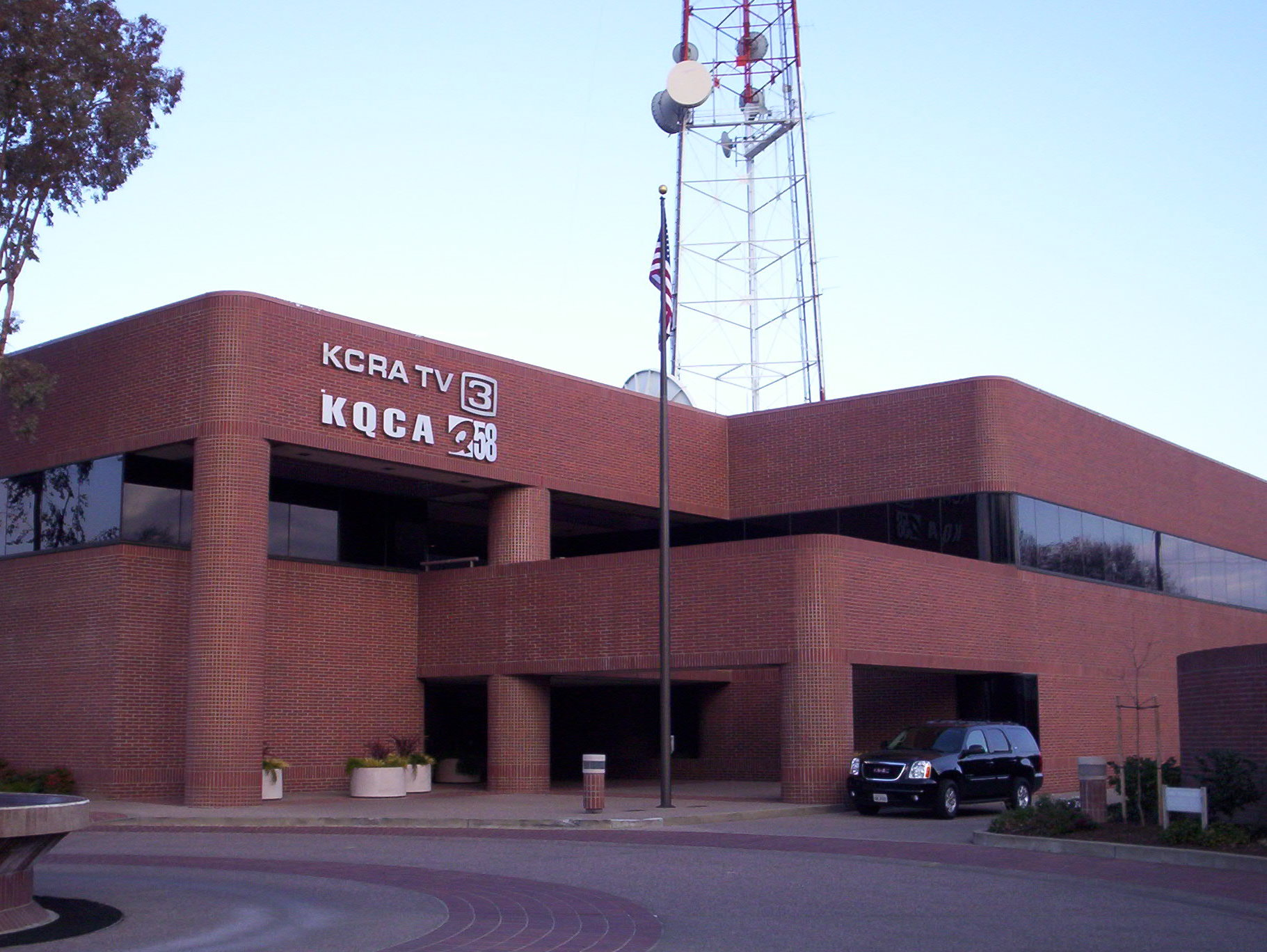
- KQCA/KCRA studios in Sacramento
- Stockton–Sacramento–Modesto, California; United States
- City: Stockton, California
- Channels: Digital: 23 (UHF); Virtual: 58
- Branding: My58; The CW on My58 (alternate)

Programming
- Affiliations: 58.1: The CW / MyNetworkTV; for others, see § Subchannels

Ownership
- Owner: Hearst Television; (Hearst Stations Inc.)
- Sister stations: KCRA-TV

History
- First air date: April 13, 1986
- Former call signs: KSCH-TV (1986–1995)
- Former channel numbers: Analog: 58 (UHF, 1986–2009); Digital: 46 (UHF, 2000–2020)
- Former affiliations: Independent (1986–1995); CBS, NBC (secondary, 1986–1994); UPN (1995–1998); The WB (1998–2006); MyNetworkTV (primary, 2006–2023)
- Call sign meaning: Station branded as "Q58" in the 1990s

Technical information
- Licensing authority: FCC
- Facility ID: 10242
- ERP: 1,000 kW
- HAAT: 578.6 m (1,898 ft)
- Transmitter coordinates: 38°15′54″N 121°29′28″W

Links
- Public license information: Public file; LMS
- Website: My58

KQCA (channel 58) is a television station licensed to Stockton, California, United States, serving the Sacramento area as an affiliate of The CW and MyNetworkTV. It is owned by Hearst Television alongside NBC affiliate KCRA-TV (channel 3). The two stations share studios on Television Circle off D Street in downtown Sacramento; KQCA's transmitter is located in Walnut Grove, California.

Channel 58 began broadcasting on April 13, 1986, as KSCH-TV. It was the Sacramento market's third independent station and was built by William H. Schuyler and the SFN Companies, broadcasting from studios in the Sacramento suburb of Rancho Cordova. Its programming initially consisted mostly of classic movies and TV shows. In 1993, with its owner in financial difficulty, it began airing a 10 p.m. newscast produced by KCRA-TV. This relationship grew in 1994 when KSCH-TV was sold to two Sacramento residents who leased its airtime to KCRA's then-owner, Kelly Broadcasting. It became a UPN affiliate and changed its call sign to KQCA in February 1995, switching from UPN to The WB in 1998. Hearst acquired KCRA-TV in 1999 and then bought KQCA outright when duopolies were legalized.

In 2006, The WB and UPN merged to form The CW, which selected competitor KMAX-TV as its Sacramento affiliate. Channel 58 affiliated with MyNetworkTV after the merger. When KMAX disaffiliated from The CW in 2023, KQCA replaced it as the local affiliate. The station airs morning and 10 p.m. newscasts produced by KCRA-TV.

== History ==
=== KSCH: Independent years ===
In 1979, the William H. Schuyler Company, owned by William H. Schuyler and his wife Kristine, filed for a construction permit to build a station on channel 58 in Stockton. William Schuyler, founder of KMST in Monterey and involved in the startup of KTVU in Oakland prior to that, proposed to broadcast a hybrid of conventional and subscription television programming. The Federal Communications Commission (FCC) granted the application on November 6, 1981, and the call sign KSCH-TV in early 1982. After analyzing financing sources, Schuyler sold 49 percent of the station to SFN Communications, an educational publisher which had diversified into broadcasting.

KSCH-TV began broadcasting on April 13, 1986. It had studios in Rancho Cordova and Stockton and shared the KXTV/KOVR tower in Walnut Grove. It was the third independent station for the Sacramento market alongside KTXL (channel 40) and KRBK-TV (channel 31). Its programming was reliant on movies and classic TV series as well as some sports and a few cartoons. It was designed to be family-friendly with a small news staff and hourly afternoon and evening news breaks. Three months after channel 58 went on air, Schuyler sold his controlling stake to SFN, which in turn sold almost all its broadcasting holdings in a management buyout, forming Pegasus Broadcasting Inc. Schuyler then left to start KSMS-TV in Monterey.

In its early years, KSCH-TV provided a mix of local programming. Originating in Stockton was a midday agribusiness program, first titled Agribusiness Report and later Valley Farm News. In 1987, channel 58 brought veteran local children's show Cap'n Mitch back to the local airwaves. Mitch, real name Mitch Agruss, had been Cap'n Delta from 1961 to 1966 at KOVR and Cap'n Mitch at KLOC-TV from 1966 to 1968 and KTXL from 1968 to 1983. By the end of 1987, the station had attracted 3% of the Sacramento viewing market compared to 8% for KTXL and 6% for KRBK. The 1988 adoption of metered instead of diary ratings, which more accurately measured viewing, showed that KSCH-TV was more competitive than had previously been thought. In early 1990, KSCH-TV began airing NBC's Saturday morning cartoon lineup after NBC's Sacramento affiliate, KCRA-TV (channel 3), opted to preempt the cartoons for local news. The station slowly improved its syndicated programming inventory, acquiring more recent series to air in early evenings.

GE Capital acquired three of Pegasus's television stations in 1990: KSCH-TV; WJBF-TV in Augusta, Georgia; and WAPA-TV in San Juan, Puerto Rico. The deal was seen by industry sources as a way for GE to protect its equity investment in the firm, which was presenting financial difficulties. In 1993, GE Capital began shopping KSCH-TV for sale; in one potential proposal, both KSCH and KRBK-TV—then also facing financial difficulties and owing money to syndicators—would have been sold to one buyer, who would have been able to sell off one of the stations to a noncompetitive entity.

The host segments of Real Stories of the Highway Patrol, featuring California Highway Patrol commissioner Maury Hannigan, were filmed at KSCH-TV's studios and included in the nationally syndicated program. Hannigan's office was replicated in a set at the station's studios.

=== KQCA: Kelly Broadcasting LMA ===
A development elsewhere in Sacramento television would alter the course of channel 58's history. From 1991 to 1993, KCRA-TV had been authorized by NBC to air an early prime time lineup from 7 to 10 p.m. and its late local news at 10 p.m. However, in August 1993, NBC ordered KCRA-TV to revert to a normal prime time lineup. KCRA was still interested in producing a 10 p.m. local newscast to air on another local station. Its preference was a station without an existing newscast, which KTXL and KRBK both boasted. On September 12, 1993, KSCH-TV began airing the KCRA-TV–produced Prime Time News.

With its new relationship with KCRA-TV, parent Kelly Broadcasting became interested in acquiring KSCH-TV but could not do so outright under FCC rules of the time. The solution was for Kelly to run the station under a local marketing agreement (LMA). This came to pass in April 1994, when Pegasus sold the station for $8 million to Channel 58, Inc., owned by Sacramento restaurateur Wing Fat and Barbara Scurfield. Kelly acquired the station's program inventory and leased the station's airtime.

The sale and LMA were approved on December 12, 1994. That day, channel 58 announced it would become an affiliate of UPN, a new television network launching in January 1995. KSCH-TV became KQCA on February 1, 1995. In 1995, KQCA preempted its daytime lineup to air the murder trial of O.J. Simpson, posting ratings figures double its normal viewership during the day. KCRA expanded its morning newscast to include a 7 a.m. hour on KQCA later that year and an 8 a.m. hour in July 1996.

The UPN affiliation agreement ran for three years, and in 1997, UPN became aware that KQCA planned not to renew, according to reporting in Broadcasting & Cable. The Paramount Stations Group responded by purchasing the market's WB affiliate, channel 31, in a deal announced in July 1997. It was immediately seen as portending an affiliation switch for channel 31 from The WB to UPN. Channel 58 became the WB affiliate for Sacramento on January 5, 1998, with UPN programming moving that same day to channel 31, renamed from KPWB to KMAX-TV.

=== Hearst ownership and switch to MyNetworkTV ===
Citing consolidation pressures, Kelly Broadcasting exited the business in August 1998 and sold KCRA-TV and its LMA with KQCA to Hearst-Argyle Television for $520 or $530 million. The deal valued KQCA alone at $120 million. After Hearst closed on the purchase in January 1999, it exercised its option to buy KQCA outright ahead of the FCC authorizing duopolies—the outright ownership of two broadcast licenses in a market.

In response to flat ratings, the morning show was dropped in 2002 and replaced with a simulcast of Armstrong & Getty, a morning radio show on talk station KSTE. The idea originated with general manager Elliott Troshinsky; in addition to being competitive with CBS's The Early Show, the radio ratings grew year-over-year. In 2005, the 10 p.m. newscast was expanded from 30 minutes to a full hour.

The WB and UPN effectively merged in 2006 to form The CW; KMAX-TV, along with ten other UPN owned-and-operated stations, was immediately named one of the network's stations. Hearst put out a press release declaring, "The strength of KQCA is not solely dependent on the WB network programming for success." KQCA affiliated with MyNetworkTV, a new network set up by Fox Television Stations, that September. It initially ran MyNetworkTV programming on an early prime time basis from 7 to 9 p.m. followed by The Oprah Winfrey Show as a lead-in to the news. The Armstrong & Getty simulcast ended in March 2007 and was replaced with a revived two-hour morning newscast. Initially, it performed poorly in the ratings, unlike KCRA's own morning newscast. Estrella TV, a Spanish-language TV network, launched locally as a subchannel of KQCA in 2015.

The KQCA 10 p.m. newscast was extended from thirty minutes back to a full hour on September 22, 2014. In 2022, the morning newscast was extended with a third hour at 9 a.m.

=== CW affiliation ===
Logo used for CW programming

On October 3, 2022, Nexstar Media Group acquired majority ownership of The CW. Under the agreement, CBS was given the right to pull its affiliations from KMAX-TV and its seven other CW stations, which was exercised on May 5, 2023. On August 1, Hearst and The CW agreed to a new affiliation agreement which included KQCA as Sacramento's new CW affiliate. Programs from MyNetworkTV continued to air from midnight to 2 a.m.

== Local programming ==
=== Newscasts ===
KCRA-TV's newsroom produces 22 hours a week of exclusive newscasts for KQCA, consisting of a 7–10 a.m. morning news extension on weekdays and an hour-long 10 p.m. newscast seven nights a week. KQCA also simulcasts KCRA newscasts at 6 a.m. and noon.

=== Sports ===
KQCA became an affiliate of the Los Angeles Chargers preseason TV network in 2021. On September 5, 2023, KQCA announced an agreement with UC Davis to air five Aggies college football games from UC Davis Health Stadium, with two featuring pregame content. The partnership continued in 2024.

== Technical information ==
KQCA began broadcasting its own digital signal on May 1, 2003; prior to this time, it was broadcast as a subchannel of KCRA's digital signal. The station ended regular programming on its analog signal, over UHF channel 58, on June 12, 2009, as part of the federally mandated transition from analog to digital television. The station's digital signal remained on its pre-transition channel 46, using virtual channel 58.

KQCA relocated its signal from channel 46 to channel 23 on April 29, 2020, as a result of the 2016 United States wireless spectrum auction. It became the ATSC 3.0 (NextGen TV) lighthouse station for Sacramento on June 15, 2021.

=== Subchannels ===
The station's ATSC 1.0 channels are carried on the multiplexed signals of other Sacramento television stations:

Subchannels provided by KQCA (ATSC 1.0)
Subchannel	Res.	Short name	Programming	ATSC 1.0 host
58.1	1080i	KQCA	The CW & MyNetworkTV	KCRA-TV
58.2	480i	H and I	Heroes & Icons	KCRA-TV
58.3	480i	Estrela	Estrella TV	KTFK-DT

KQCA's transmitter is located in Walnut Grove, California.

Subchannels of KQCA (ATSC 3.0)
Subchannel	Res.	Short name	Programming
3.1	1080p	NBC	NBC (KCRA-TV)
10.1	720p	ABC	ABC (KXTV)
13.1	1080p	CBS	CBS (KOVR)
19.1	720p	Uni	Univision (KUVS-DT)
40.1	720p	FOX	Fox (KTXL)
58.1	1080p	My58	The CW, MyNetworkTV

Subchannel broadcast with digital rights management
