= Clover Park High School =

High school in Washington, United States

Coordinates: 47.158°N 122.519°W

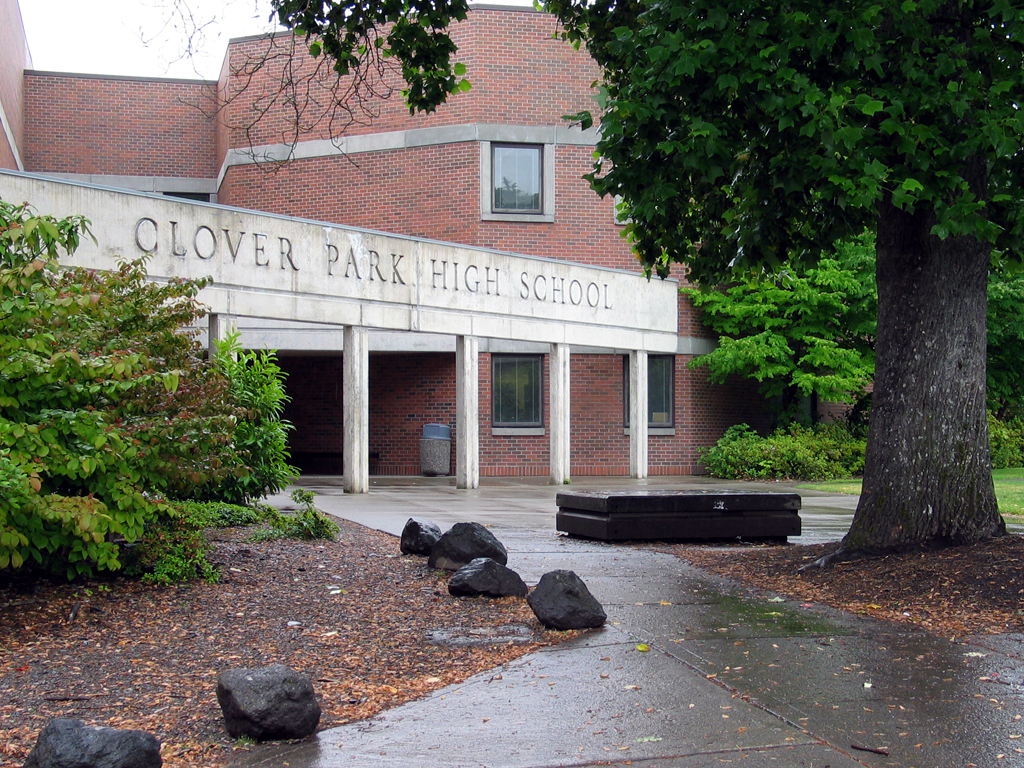
- Clover Park High School entrance.
- 11023 Gravelly Lake Dr. SW; Lakewood, WA 98499

Information
- Type: Public
- Established: 1938
- School district: Clover Park No. 400
- Principal: Jennifer Appel
- Staff: 71.00 (on an FTE basis)
- Grades: 9-12
- Enrollment: 1,137 (2023–2024)
- Student to teacher ratio: 16.01
- Colors: Green, white and gold
- Athletics: SPSL 2A 2010 Football Champions, Soccer, Volleyball, Cross Country, Swimming, Tennis, Golf, State 2A 2011 Boys Basketball Champions, Girls Basketball, Baseball, Softball, Track, Wrestling
- Athletics conference: WIAA
- Mascot: Timberwolves
- Rival: Lakes High School
- Newspaper: Clover Leaves
- Yearbook: Klahowya
- Website: Home page

Clover Park High School (CPHS), located in Lakewood, Washington, is one of two secondary schools within the Clover Park School District.

== History ==
The high school was established in 1938 due to the rapid expansion of nearby military posts at Fort Lewis.

The cornerstone of the first Clover Park High School was laid June 28, 1938. According to the 1981 Clover Park yearbook, Klahowya, on February 23 of that year a fire destroyed the gym (where the fire had been started), the music center and the business department. Junior Alfred Shropshire was arrested and convicted for starting the fire. One wing of the original school is now used for the school district's Student Services Center.

The class of 1963 was the leading edge of the Baby Boom and was the largest graduating class of CPHS. The class of 1964 was actually larger, but in 1963, the class of 1964 split in half and formed the rival school Lakes High School.

Approximately 1100 students are enrolled each year. Their school mascot are the Timberwolves (formerly Warriors) and the colors are kelly green, gold, and white. During the 2014/2015 school year the current principal, Tim Stults, took the reins from the former principal, John Seaton.

In 2006, CPHS was listed in the OSPI (Washington State Office of Public Instruction) document The High Schools We Need: Improving an American Institution. The OSPI document states, "Clover Park is committed to maintaining high expectations for rigorous performance from students."

In November 2021, Clover Park High School announced that it's in the process of changing its mascot (Warriors) to comply with a new state law prohibiting the inappropriate use of Native American names, symbols and imagery in public school names, mascots, logos or team names. In January 2022, the school would announce that the new mascot change are the "Timberwolves."

According to OSPI the evidence of effectiveness:

(1) Between 2002 and 2010, WASL scores increased by 30.4 percent in reading, 4.4 percent in math, 43.7 percent in writing, and 6.9 percent in science.
(2) Over the past seven years, student achievement increased and the gaps narrowed between the racial, ethnic, gender, cultural, and economic class groups within the school.
(3) The annual dropout rate declined from 14.1 percent to 5.5 percent between 2001 and 2010.
(4) The school successfully made adequate yearly progress in all areas in 2005 and was not mandated to do a plan for improvement.
(5) The college retention rate of students who received the Bill and Melinda Gates Scholarship as high school juniors averaged more than 75 percent in each year 2002-2004.
(6) Retention of highly qualified faculty has increased over the last five years.

== Students ==
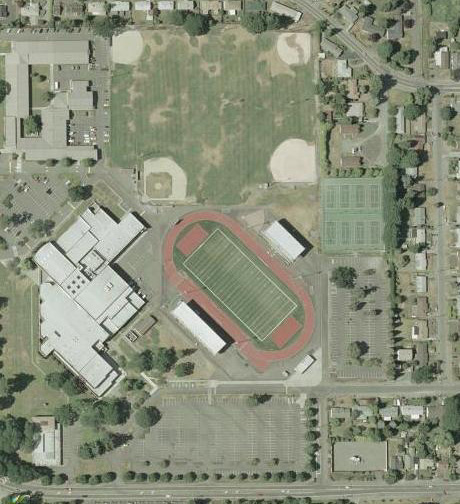
Aerial photo of Clover Park High School. The building in the upper left is part of the old high school, which now houses the Clover Park School District administrative offices.

Out of the approximate 1100 student body, 68 percent are minorities, and 69 percent receive a free or reduced lunch. 10.2% of the student population is transitional bilingual. 69% of the teachers hold master's degrees and 100% are considered "highly qualified" according to No Child Left Behind Guidelines.

== Smaller Learning Communities Program ==
In August 2003, the Bill & Melinda Gates Foundation promised $540,000 over five years to the school to "support personalized learning environments where all students achieve." The school is thus sometimes referred to as a "Gates Grant school," in reference to the donation.

The highly diverse school used the grant to engage in major restructuring as part of the "Smaller Learning Communities Program" (SLCP) which is intended to help large schools create smaller and safer communities within themselves. The program has received criticism, as parents complained that dividing the school into separate "houses" limited the selection of courses, and that attempts to "Raise the Bar" for all students had the effect of "dummying down" the challenges available to more able students.,

CPHS is now recognized as a leader in high school reform by the School Redesign Network at Stanford University and OSPI for the improvements in student learning and for narrowing the achievement gap. (SRN case study/ OSPI High Schools We Need).

== Daffodil Festival ==
Every year, Clover Park participates in the Pierce County Daffodil Festival. A competition is held in house to select the Clover Park Princess, who goes on to compete against other regional schools, for the Daffodil Festival Queen title. The Queen title is considered the highest honor of the regional festival. The Clover Park band accompanies the float of Clover Park's princesses every year in the parade, held annually in April.

== Notable alumni and staff ==
Notable Clover Park High School alumni and staff members include:

- Sandi Gordon, soccer player for the United States women's national team
- John Greek and Rich Dangel, guitarists with The Wailers, who wrote "Tall Cool One" while at the school;
- Kent Kammerer (1951 grad), Seattle teacher and neighborhood activist
- Jackie Kellogg (1989 grad), MLB draft pick of the Kansas City Royals and CFL Grey Cup Champion with the Calgary Stampeders
- John Kelly, Chairman and CEO of Alaska Airlines from 1995 to 2003.
- Bryan Monroe (1983 grad), former president of the National Association of Black Journalists, former vice president and editorial director of Ebony and Jet magazines, and editor of CNNPolitics.com.
- Michael Parker (1999) professional basketball player
- Cap Peterson Major League baseball outfielder (1960 graduate)
- Ropati Pitoitua (2003 grad), New York Jets Defensive End
- William (Bill) Priedhorsky Los Alamos scientist (1969 graduate)
- Tavita Pritchard (2005 grad), current head football coach and former starting QB for Stanford University.
- Mike Reed, NFL player

== Fight song ==
The CPHS fight song is performed to the music of the Washington State University fight song.

== See also ==
- Clover Park Technical College
