= Clover Park School District =

School district in Pierce County, Washington, US

Location
- Lakewood, Washington United States
- Coordinates: 47°09′32″N 122°31′11″W

District information
- Type: Public
- Grades: Pre-K through 12
- Superintendent: Ron Banner

Students and staff
- Students: 12,019
- Teachers: 849
- Staff: 729

Other information
- Website: www.cloverpark.k12.wa.us

The Clover Park School District (CPSD) is the fourth largest school district in Pierce County, Washington, United States, and the 28th largest public school district in the state.

== Location ==
The Clover Park School District is located directly south of Tacoma, Washington in the city of Lakewood. The district includes 68 square miles (180 km^{2}) within the western area of Pierce County.

CPSD serves the majority of Lakewood, North Fort Lewis, the Joint Base Lewis-McChord community (the district boundary includes almost all of the boundary of Fort Lewis and much of the McChord Field territory), and portions of Parkland and Tacoma.

== Schools ==
Clover Park is composed of 17 elementary schools, four middle schools, two high schools, one alternative high school and Harrison Preparatory School (grades 6-12). The district also serves two specialty schools within Western State Hospital.

High schools
Name	Grade levels/type	Established	Enrollment	Nickname	WIAA Classification	Notes
Clover Park	Comprehensive 9-12	1938	1500	Timberwolves	2A	
Lakes	Comprehensive 9-12	1962	1500	Lancers	3A	

Preparatory Schools
Name	Type	Established	Nickname
William H. Harrison Preparatory	6-12	2005	Pumas

Starting with the 2009-2010 school year, Harrison Prep offered grades 6 through 12 only, to allow for an International Baccalaureate (Middle Years Program).

Middle schools
Name	Type	Established	Nickname
Hudtloff	6-8	|2019| Hurricanes	
Lochburn	6-8	1968	Lions
Thomas	6-8	2020	Spartans

Elementary schools
- Beachwood
- Carter Lake
- Custer
- Dower
- Evergreen
- Four Heroes
- Hillside
- Idlewild
- Lake Louise
- Lakeview
- Oakbrook
- Oakwood
- Park Lodge
- Rainier
- Tillicum
- Tyee Park

== Demographics ==
The CPSD student body is approximately 46% White, 22% Hispanic, 13% Black, 6% Asian, 3% Pacific Islander, 1% Native American, <1% Other, and 9% mixed. The median household income is $52,089. About 7.6% of students have a disability.

== Racial discipline policy ==
Data from Washington schools indicated that black students were disciplined more often than white students. "Are you dispersing discipline across the ethnicities, the racial groups, equitably", asked a district superintendent, "are you disciplining African-American boys more than you're disciplining white boys?"

== Military influence ==
There has been a significant military influence within the district due to its proximity to Joint Base Lewis-McChord. Each of its two senior high schools are home to two Junior Reserve Officers' Training Corps (JROTC) programs. Clover Park High School has an Air Force JROTC program, and Lakes High School has an Army JROTC program.

About 31% of students within the district live on a military base while 40% are funded military dependents. From 1985 to 2011, there have been 90 appointments to military academies from CPSD.
