= Mary Mazur =

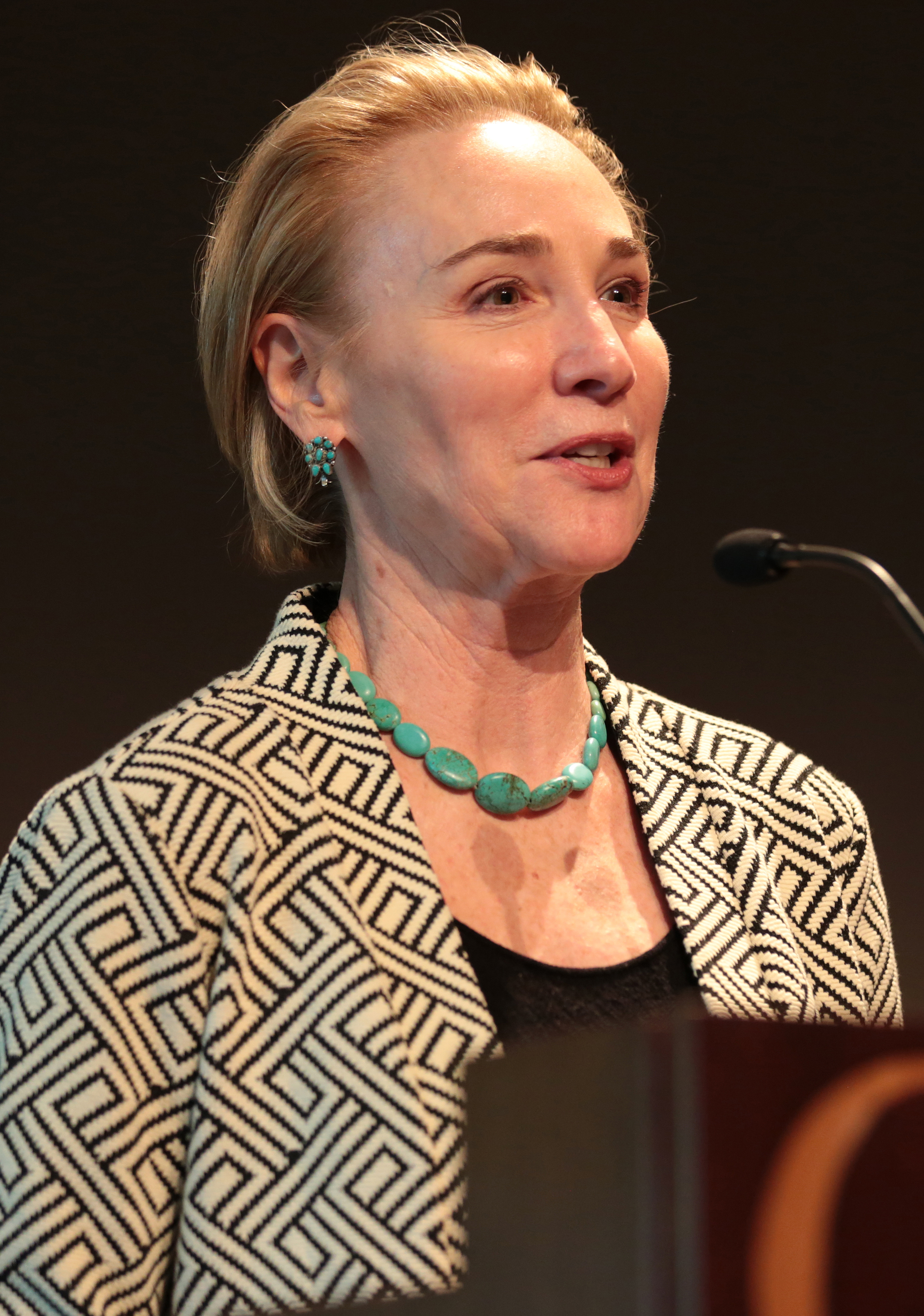
- Mary Mazur in 2017
- Other name: Mare Mazur
- Occupation: Television producer

Mary/Mare Mazur is a television producer, with a career working in television movies, prime time programming, and drama development. She is a graduate of Santa Clara University.

== Career ==
Her job titles include:

- Manager and then director of drama development at NBC, 1984–1989
- Vice president of series development for CBS Productions, 1989–1992
- Senior vice president of development for Patchett Kaufman Entertainment, 1992–1994
- Senior vice president of series development at Cosgrove/Meurer Productions (CMP), 1994–1997
- Executive vice president and chief operating officer of KCETLink Media Group, 1997–2017
- General manager of Arizona PBS, 2017–2020
- Executive director of Southern Nevada Public Television / president and general manager of Vegas PBS, 2021–2026

She has been executive producer, development executive, or similar, of, in no particular order:

- World War II Behind Closed Doors: Stalin, the Nazis and the West
- How Art Made the World
- A Place of Our Own / Los Niños en Su Casa
- PBS Hollywood Presents (episodes of this series include "The Old Settler", "Collected Stories", "Copenhagen", "Cop Shop", and "The Gin Game")
- Auschwitz: Inside the Nazi State
- Tavis Smiley
- California Connected
- Life & Times
- Merry Christmas, George Bailey
- Buena Vista Social Club
- Chasing the Sun, a four-part PBS documentary
- American Family: Journey of Dreams
- Matlock
- A Year in the Life
- Rescue 911
- Dr. Quinn, Medicine Woman
