= KCET =

Television station in Los Angeles

- Logo used since February 6, 2024

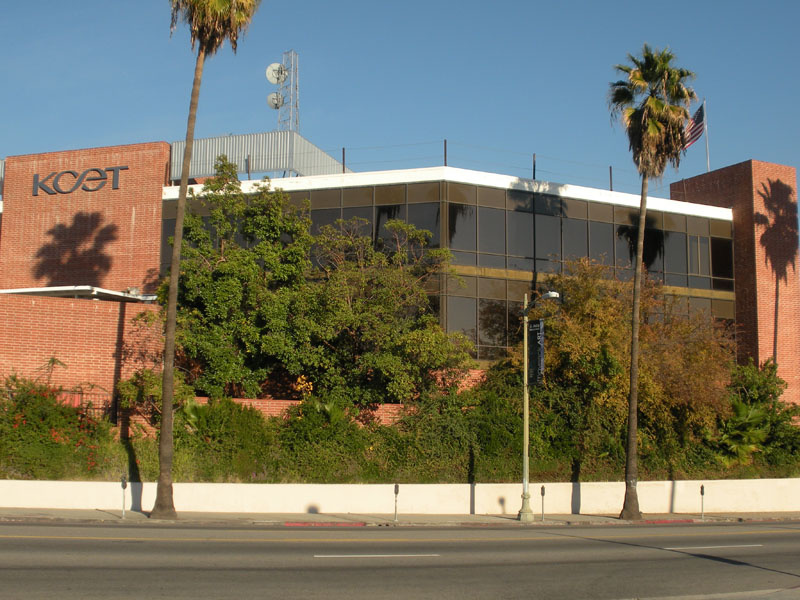
- KCET's longtime studios in Los Angeles
- Los Angeles, California; United States
- Channels: Digital: 28 (UHF), shared with KLCS; Virtual: 28
- Branding: PBS SoCal Plus

Programming
- Affiliations: 28.1: PBS; for others, see § Subchannels

Ownership
- Owner: Public Media Group of Southern California
- Sister stations: KOCE-TV

History
- First air date: September 28, 1964
- Former channel numbers: Analog: 28 (UHF, 1964–2009); Digital: 59 (UHF, 2000–2009)
- Former affiliations: NET (1964–1970); Educational independent (2011–2019)
- Call sign meaning: California Educational Television; Committee for Educational Television; Community Educational Television; -or-; Cultural and Educational Television

Technical information
- Licensing authority: FCC
- Facility ID: 13058
- ERP: 150 kW
- HAAT: 926.4 m (3,039 ft)
- Transmitter coordinates: 34°13′26″N 118°3′47″W
- Translator(s): see § Translators

Links
- Public license information: Public file; LMS
- Website: www.pbssocal.org

KCET (channel 28), branded as PBS SoCal Plus, is a secondary PBS member television station in Los Angeles, California, United States. It is owned by the Public Media Group of Southern California alongside the market's primary PBS member, Huntington Beach–licensed KOCE-TV (channel 50). The two stations share studios at The Pointe (on West Alameda Avenue and Bob Hope Drive, between The Burbank Studios and Walt Disney Studios complexes) in Burbank; KCET's transmitter is located atop Mount Wilson in the San Gabriel Mountains (north of Sierra Madre).

== History ==
=== Background of educational television in Southern California ===
KCET was the second attempt at establishing an educational station in the Los Angeles area: KTHE, operated by the University of Southern California, had previously broadcast on channel 28, beginning on September 22, 1953. It was the second educational television station in the United States, signing on six months and four days after KUHT in Houston, but ceased broadcasting after only nine months on the air because its primary benefactor, the Hancock Foundation, determined that the station was too much of a financial drain on its resources.

=== Station history ===
==== Early history, as an NET station ====
KCET—the call letters of which stand for either California Educational Television, Committee for Educational Television, Community Educational Television, or Cultural and Educational Television—first signed on the air on September 28, 1964, as an affiliate of National Educational Television (NET). The station was originally licensed to the non-profit group Community Television of Southern California (CTSC). Part of the station's initial funding came from four of Los Angeles's commercial stations–KNXT (channel 2; now KCBS-TV), KNBC (channel 4), KTTV (channel 11) and KCOP (channel 13)–along with grants from the Ford Foundation and the U.S. Department of Health, Education and Welfare. KCET initially broadcast in black and white from Monday through Friday. James Loper, a co-founder of CTSC, served as the station's director of education from 1964 to 1966 and then vice president and general manager from 1966 to 1971. Loper then served as president of KCET from 1971 to 1983. Creative Person—John Burton a 30-minute film biography of Glass artist and Philosopher John Burton was the first color film commissioned by KCET-TV in 1965. It won the first two Los Angeles area Emmys for KCET for John Burton, and for the production by George Van Valkenburg. Van Valkenburg also produced a one-hour documentary film titled Paris Air Show 1967 for KCET.

KCET was originally located at 1313 North Vine Street in Hollywood, at what was the original Mutual-Don Lee Broadcasting System Building. The facility was also originally home to two of Los Angeles' first television stations—KTSL (channel 2; now KCBS-TV), and KFI/KHJ-TV (channel 9; now KCAL-TV, which both signed-on the air in May, and August 1948 respectively. Both stations eventually moved out by the early 1960s, just a couple of years before KCET officially took to the air. ABC also began taking up occupancy in the building, using it as a secondary studio facility for its television studio lot (which at the time also housed KABC-TV, channel 7) near the eastern end of Hollywood.

Prior to applying for and receiving a construction permit to build the new channel 28, CTSC attempted to acquire one of Los Angeles's seven existing VHF commercial stations. In 1968, Community Television of Southern California emerged as a potential buyer of KTLA's channel 5 license from then-owner Gene Autry, but could not raise the cash needed to make a serious offer. If CTSC succeeded in moving KCET to channel 5, the move would have mirrored a similar occurrence seven years earlier in the New York City area, where local broadcasters assisted a non-profit group in purchasing commercial independent VHF station WNTA-TV and converting it into non-commercial, educational WNDT (it is now WNET).

==== As a PBS member station ====
On October 5, 1970, KCET became a charter member of the Public Broadcasting Service (PBS) at the programming service's inception. For most of the next 40 years, it was the second-most-watched PBS station in the country and occasionally produced programs distributed to PBS and to individual public television stations. The station served as Southern California's flagship PBS member station, with San Bernardino-licensed KVCR (channel 24)—which the San Bernardino Community College District signed on the air on September 11, 1962—as the service's original sole secondary outlet. KCET gained additional competitors when the Coast Community College District signed on Huntington Beach-licensed KOCE-TV (channel 50) on November 20, 1972, and the Los Angeles Unified School District (LAUSD) signed on secondary Los Angeles member KLCS (channel 58) on November 5, 1973.

In 1971, KCET purchased the former Monogram Pictures property at 1425 Fleming Street (now Hoover Street) in a historic area of East Hollywood—which was used as a film and television studio from 1912 to 1970—to serve as the station's headquarters, an acquisition assisted in part by financial contributions from both the Ford Foundation and the Michael Connell Foundation. The building was renamed the Weingart Educational Telecommunications Center and housed KCET's master control, digital control rooms, ingest, and editing stations on the first floor, and engineering, and new media operations, and news and public affairs departments on the second floor.

In 1994, KCET and Store of Knowledge Incorporated, a Cerritos-based company, launched the KCET Store of Knowledge in Glendale as the first of many partnership stores with PBS affiliates. The store was a partnership between KCET, educational store Lakeshore Learning Materials, and the venture capital firm of Riordan, Lewis and Haden, which included former Los Angeles mayor Richard Riordan. The chain continued to operate until 2001. In 2004, as part of its image-reclaiming public relations after the Gulf oil spill, BP started granting KCET half the funding for preschool shows including A Place of Our Own and Los Ninos en Su Casa, a Spanish-language version. The other half of the $50 million grants for the show and supporting outreach programs came from First 5 California plus additional funding from an anonymous donor. The show won Peabody and local Emmy awards and was shown nationally over PBS. KCET renamed its production studio to BP Studios in thanks.

PBS included BP's and other grants for the two pre-school shows in its complex progressive dues structures, even though the grants came with the stipulation that they could not be used for administrative costs. The PBS dues for KCET had previously been $4.9 million but with the grants included the dues increased by 40% to close to $7 million. Other large funding sources that had previously been counted on were shrinking and thus could not be tapped to pay the dues. KCET's request that these specific grants, which were restricted to show production only, not be counted towards the dues owed was denied; PBS executives indicated that PBS stations were expected to anticipate their dues and increase their reserves to pay them, and therefore would not give special treatment to KCET. With the January 2010 half-year payment coming up, KCET offered to reduce their status to a secondary affiliation, reducing the dues owed to a total of $1.3 million. The Corporation for Public Broadcasting (CPB) would pay $750,000 and a special campaign was to raise the rest. PBS rejected the offer, insisting the station remain as the primary affiliate.

==== As an independent public television station ====
On October 8, 2010, KCET announced that it could not reach an agreement to remain with PBS, and would end its partnership with PBS after 40 years to become an independent public television station—the second-largest such station in the United States in terms of market size, behind WNYE-TV in New York City—on January 1, 2011. KCET station management cited unresolvable financial and programming disputes among its major reasons for leaving PBS. After channel 28 left PBS, KOCE-TV replaced KCET as the area's primary PBS station. Prior to the new affiliation arrangement, KCET discussed plans to purchase KOCE-TV from its licensee, the Coast Community College District, but later opted not to place a bid for the station. A consortium involving Southern California's PBS stations—KCET, KOCE, secondary Los Angeles member KLCS and San Bernardino-licensed KVCR—was also proposed to be formed to unite various functions, certain programming, fundraising and marketing, to save money. However, KCET passed on the offer.

On February 4, 2011, the Federal Communications Commission (FCC) fined KCET $10,000 for failure to make its public file available for inspection by the general public. On March 30, 2011, the Los Angeles Times reported that in light of the sharp decrease in KCET's ratings and pledges following disaffiliation from PBS, it was in negotiations to sell the KCET Studios in Hollywood to the Church of Scientology, with KCET relocating to a smaller site following the sale. The sale of the property, which was sold for $45 million, closed on April 25, 2011, with part of the proceeds going towards KCET's leasing of the studios until new facilities were found. KCET relocated in April 2012 to a new complex in a high-rise, state-of-the art building, The Pointe located in Burbank. The move left CW owned-and-operated station KTLA (channel 5) as the last remaining radio or television broadcaster in Los Angeles that maintains studio facilities in Hollywood until 2025, when Meruelo Broadcasting sold off KWHY-TV (channel 22) to Sunset Boulevard Broadcasting, a company affiliated with the Church of Scientology; all other area stations had moved their operations to other L.A.-area neighborhoods and cities within the region. At the end of the 2011 fiscal year, contributions and grants to KCET decreased even further, down 41% from the previous year to $22.3 million.

In August 2011, KCET and Eyetronics Media & Studios (a company owned by former Walt Disney Company executive Dominique Bigle) agreed to partner on producing or acquiring Southern California-focused original series.

==== Merger with Link TV ====
In October 2012, KCET announced it intended to merge with San Francisco-based Link Media (owner of non-commercial satellite network Link TV) to form KCETLink, a joint non-profit venture based in Burbank operating as a single 501(c)(3) multimedia organization; under the terms of the agreement, KCET would also add Link TV on one of the station's digital subchannels. KCETLink then reached a much wider broadcast audience that includes Link Media's 33 million subscribers on DirecTV and Dish Network, and KCET's 5.6 million households in Southern and Central California. On January 5, 2015, Michael Riley, former executive at ABC Family (now Freeform), was named the new CEO of KCETLink (replacing Al Jerome, who left on January 16, 2017). KCET would later stop carrying Link TV over the air, replacing it with the PBS Kids Channel.

==== Merger with KOCE; return to PBS ====
KCET logo from 2021 to the 2024 rebranding after rejoining PBS in 2019.

On April 25, 2018, KCETLink Media Group and the KOCE-TV Foundation announced that they would merge. KOCE remained the market's primary PBS station, KCET returned to PBS as a secondary member, and both stations continued to provide their existing programming services. Once the merger completed, KOCE moved from its Costa Mesa facility to the current KCET facility in Burbank, maintaining the Costa Mesa location as a secondary facility. The merger closed on October 1, with the combined company branded as Public Media Group of Southern California.

In October 2019 (one year after the merger with KOCE was completed), KCET officially rejoined PBS after eight years as an educational independent station. On January 19, 2024, PBS SoCal announced plans to rebrand KCET as PBS SoCal Plus starting on February 6.

=== Subchannel history ===
In 2006, KCET launched a digital channel, KCET Desert Cities, for digital television and cable for the Coachella Valley. (In September of that year, KCET announced a similar channel for Orange County in partnership with California State University, Fullerton to be launched in late 2007, when it replaced a simulcast of KCET's analog signal.) In August 2007, KCET began carrying PBS and American Public Television's cultural, news and history-oriented network World on digital subchannel 28.4, and the Spanish language educational network V-me on digital subchannel 28.3.

With KCET discontinuing its membership with PBS on January 1, 2011, KCET restructured its subchannel offerings; KCET-DT 28.2 converted to children's programming service under the brand KCET Kids & Family, itself a conversion of KCET Desert Cities and KCET Orange (with programs seen on the respective channels being shifted to KCET's main channel to occupy a daytime lifestyle block), while World was replaced by MHz Worldview on KCET-DT4. (V-me programming continued to be carried on KCET-DT3.) KCET primary subchannel offered themed nights during the first year of operation. On January 1, 2013, as a byproduct of the Link Media merger, LinkTV—under the brand "KCETLink", which replaced the channel's national feed on local cable and satellite providers and simulcasted LinkTV-licensed content—replaced KCET Kids & Family on digital subchannel 28.2.

On August 5, 2013, KCET replaced MHz Worldview with NHK World on subchannel 28.4. (MHz Worldview moved to a subchannel of KLCS-DT.) On March 30, 2017, KCET ceased carrying V-Me on its subchannel as the network transitioned to a commercial ad-supported channel. It was replaced by KCETLink+ on the same day. KCETLink+ was eventually shut down and NHK World moved up to the 28.3 subchannel with its former 28.4 subchannel discontinued.

== Programming ==
While it acted as the flagship PBS station for the Los Angeles metropolitan area, KCET mainly distributed Los Angeles-based productions for other independent producers, rather than producing much programming by itself for the national PBS system.

KCET produced Roger Fisher's The Advocates (1969–1984), Boboquivari (1970–1971), Leon Russell's Homewood Session (1970 TV Special), Meeting of Minds (1977–1981), and Artbound (2012–).

In 1971, KCET began producing Hollywood Television Theater, TV movies directed by Norman Lloyd, Stacy Keach, Ivan Dixon, Lee Grant, and others. In 1976, KCET began producing Visions.

It produced the acclaimed Carl Sagan series Cosmos: A Personal Voyage from 1978 to 1979. KCET produced or presented The Cousteau Odyssey, Trying Times, and the Hispanic family drama American Family for PBS. It was one of the consortium of stations that produced American Playhouse.

To commemorate the 60th anniversary of the liberation of Auschwitz-Birkenau concentration camp, KCET produced a six-part miniseries in conjunction with the BBC called Auschwitz: Inside the Nazi State.

Huell Howser's California's Gold was produced at the KCET lot, until the series ended following Howser's death in 2013.

KCET also produced the weeknight talk show Tavis Smiley and a PBS science show, Wired Science. A television program designed for care-givers, A Place of Our Own and its Spanish language equivalent, Los Niños en Su Casa are taped at the KCET studios, produced with a grant from BP.

A few children's programs have also come from KCET—Storytime, The Puzzle Place, Adventures from the Book of Virtues, The Charlie Horse Music Pizza, and Sid the Science Kid (the latter now airing on KOCE).

KCET also produced California Connected, a television newsmagazine about various people, places and events throughout California, co-produced with KQED in San Francisco, KVIE in Sacramento, and KPBS in San Diego. This series ended its run in 2007 after five seasons.

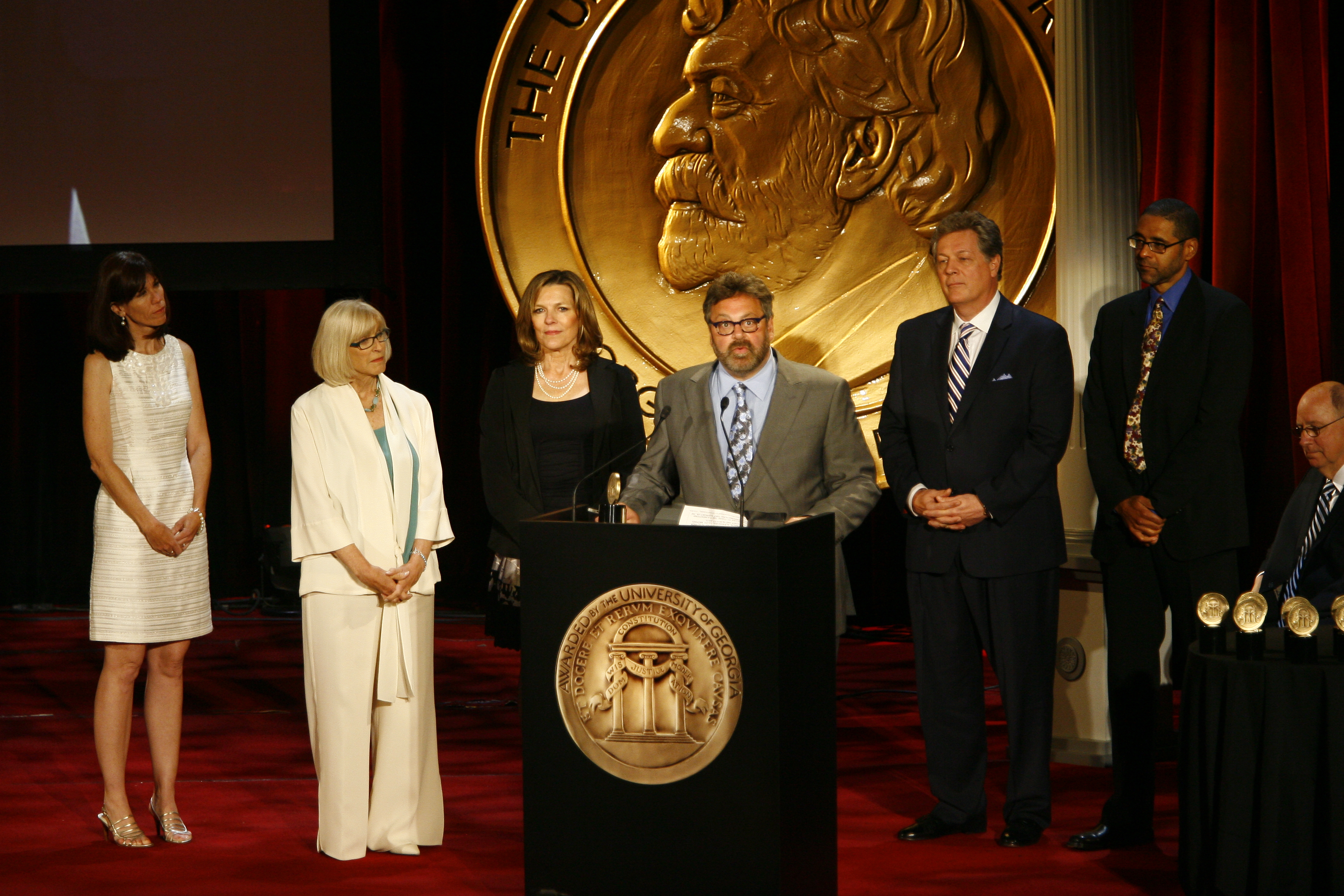
Karen Foshay, Judy Miller, Justine Schmidt, Bret Marcus, John Larson and Rick Wilkinson of KCET at the 69th Annual Peabody Awards for SoCal Connected: Up in Smoke

On December 9, 2010, KCET announced its new program schedule after its disaffiliation from PBS in 2011. Programming included movies; travel, science, and drama programs, Britcoms and news programs, as the station maintains their relationship with program syndicators American Public Television and NETA, among others, which allow non-PBS stations to air their programming. Some of the programs that were announced and/or continued on the new lineup include Globe Trekker, Rick Steves' Europe, Burt Wolf: Travels and Traditions, The Nature of Things with David Suzuki, The McLaughlin Group, Inside Washington, BBC World News, Keeping Up Appearances, As Time Goes By, Visiting With Huell Howser, and KCET's newsmagazine, SoCal Connected.

KCET's 2012 schedule included Open Call a weekly series showcasing arts and culture in Southern California hosted by opera singer Suzanna Guzmán; expansion of its interview program, LA Tonight with Roy Firestone; Your Turn to Care, a four-part documentary about caregivers hosted by Holly Robinson Peete; the BBC crime drama Inspector George Gently; the British ITV dramedy, Doc Martin; and Classic Cool Theater, a showcase of classic films, cartoons and newsreels.

Programming additions in 2015 included Moone Boy, Death in Paradise, Border Blaster, and Earth Focus. Shows licensed on LinkTV that aired on KCET in 2014 including Arab Labor and Borgen are also part of the ongoing schedule. KCET added more programs a few years later such as Zula Patrol and Wunderkind Little Amadeus.

Current original programming includes history series Lost L.A., arts series Artbound, and food series Broken Bread with chef-host Roy Choi.

Starting in early 2019, KCET began integrating its originally-produced programming with that of KOCE's, including distribution of its programs on PBS' video platforms. In addition, KCET also began re-introducing PBS-distributed programming on its daily schedule in August 2019, including PBS News Hour (which is aired live at 3 pm PT with the national 6 pm ET airing), Amanpour & Company, Nova, American Masters, and other notable news programs and documentaries commonly found on other PBS member stations.

=== Life & Times ===
Life & Times was a local news magazine and public affairs series produced by and broadcast on KCET from 1991 to 2007.

It was KCET's award-winning signature local program, and was hosted by Val Zavala. Co-hosts for Life & Times had included Patt Morrison, Hugh Hewitt, Rubén Martínez, Kerman Maddox, Errol St. Clair Smith, Jess Marlow, Warren Olney, and Jerry Nachman.

Over its 16 years on the air, Life & Times covered major issues such as politics, education, the environment, demographics, transportation, science, culture and arts. It also offered viewers profile, features, and interviews with authors, community leaders, elected officials, educators, artists, activists, actors and scholars. While it was on air it won more than 25 L.A. Area Emmy awards, numerous Golden Mikes and many other awards.

== Technical information ==
=== Subchannels ===
Subchannels of KCET and KLCS
| License | Subchannel | Res. | Short name | Programming |
|---|---|---|---|---|
| KCET | 28.1 | 720p | KCET HD | PBS |
| KCET | 28.2 | 480i | Create | Create |
| KCET | 28.3 | 480i | N H K | NHK World |
| KLCS | 58.1 | 720p | KLCS-HD | PBS |
| KLCS | 58.2 | 480i | KIDS-TV | PBS Kids |
| KLCS | 58.3 | 480i | CREATE | Create |

=== Analog-to-digital conversion and spectrum incentive auction ===
KCET began transmitting a digital television signal on UHF channel 59 in 2000. From that point until 2007, the majority of the programs (apart from most of those that aired during prime time) that were carried on KCET's main channel—which, like most PBS stations that transmitted digital television signals during that time period, served as a designated high definition feed—differed from the schedule maintained by its analog UHF channel 28 signal. It was simulcast on digital subchannel 28.2. In August 2007, programming from the main signal was integrated into the HD subchannel to accommodate for spectrum space, while at the same time preserving the integrity of the HD transmissions.

The station shut down its analog signal, over UHF channel 28, on June 12, 2009, as part of the federally mandated transition from analog to digital television. The station's digital signal operated on a high-band UHF channel (in the 52–69 channel range) that was removed from broadcast use after the official June 12, 2009, transition date; as a result, KCET selected its former analog channel allocation on UHF channel 28 for its post-transition digital operations.

On September 10, 2014, it was announced that after negotiations with KLCS' licensee, the Los Angeles Unified School District, KCET and KLCS would consolidate their broadcast signals onto one over-the-air channel band, so the remaining wireless spectrum can be divested during the FCC's 2016 spectrum incentive auction. Both stations would retain separate licenses. Earlier in the year, KLCS had participated in a trial of channel sharing with KJLA.

=== Translators ===
- K04SB-D Bakersfield
- K25QB-D Lucerne Valley
- K09XW-D Palm Desert, etc.
- K35LA-D Palm Springs
- K16FC-D San Luis Obispo
- K33QS-D Santa Barbara, etc.
- K26FT-D Santa Barbara
- K23OM-D Victorville
