= Florencia en el Amazonas =

Opera by Daniel Catán

- Opera by Daniel Catán
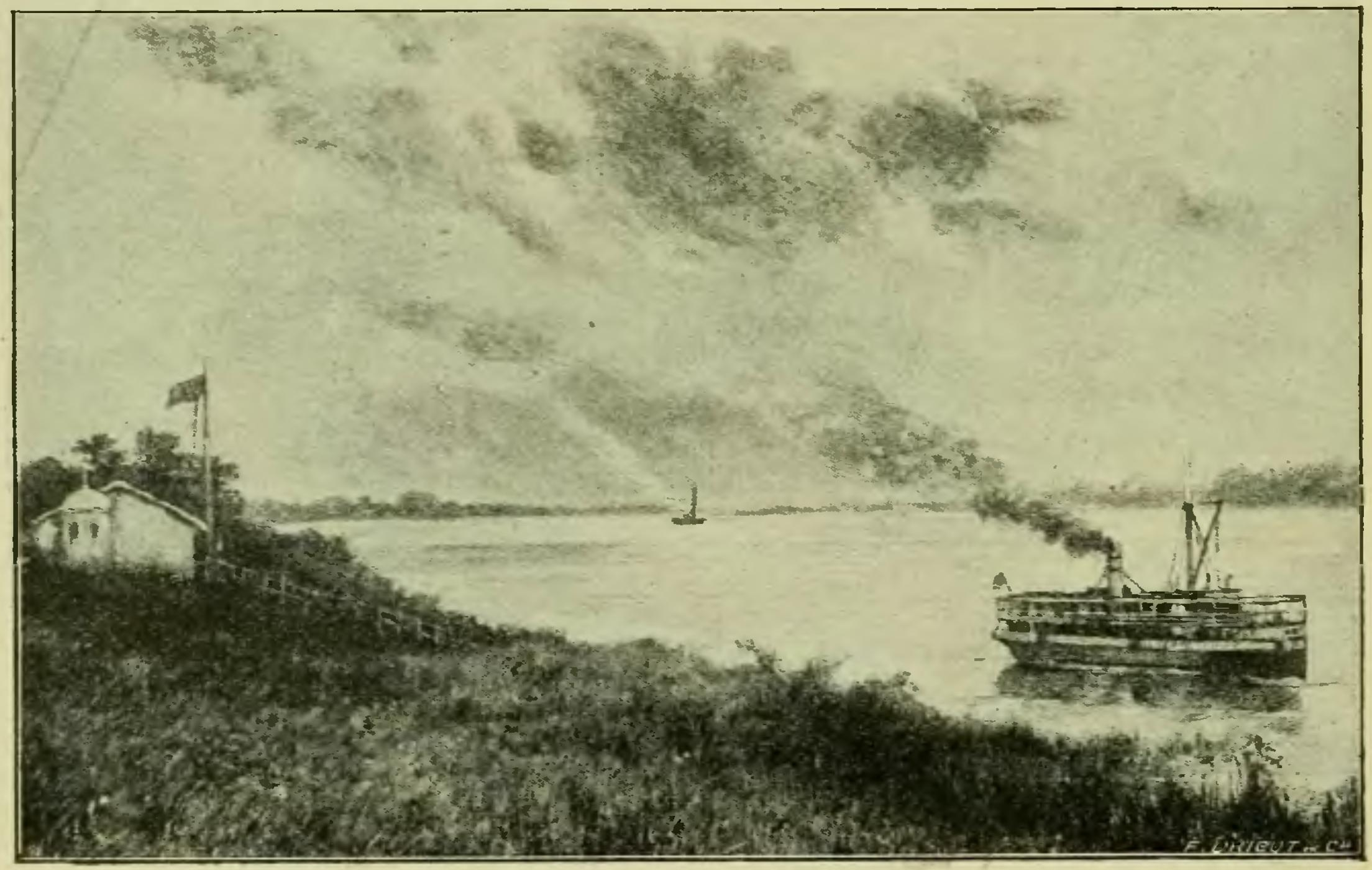
- The opera's setting, a steamboat on the Amazon in the early 1900s
- Librettist: Marcela Fuentes-Berain
- Language: Spanish
- Based on: Love in the Time of Cholera by Gabriel García Márquez
- Premiere: 25 October 1996; Wortham Theater Center, Houston, Texas

Florencia en el Amazonas (English title: Florencia in the Amazon) is an opera in two acts composed by Daniel Catán. It contains elements of magical realism in the style of Gabriel García Márquez and uses a libretto by Marcela Fuentes-Berain, one of his pupils. The characters are inspired by García Márquez, but the story is not drawn directly from any of his works. Florencia was co-commissioned by Houston Grand Opera, Los Angeles Opera, and Seattle Opera and premiered in Houston on October 25, 1996. It was the first Spanish-language opera to be commissioned by major United States opera houses.

== Performance history ==
Jointly commissioned by Houston Grand Opera, Los Angeles Opera and Seattle Opera, Florencia en el Amazonas had its world premiere at the Wortham Theater Center on 26 October 1996 performed by Houston Grand Opera. The production was directed by Francesca Zambello with sets designed by Robert Israel. The production subsequently opened at Los Angeles Opera in 1997, and then at Seattle Opera in 1998. In 1999 it was performed in concert version by the Ópera de Bellas Artes in Mexico City and received its European premiere in 2006 at the Theater Heidelberg in Germany in a new production directed by Michael Beyer.

The opera has had multiple performances in the United States in the 21st century. These include its revivals at Houston Grand Opera in 2001 and 2019, Seattle Opera in 2005, and Los Angeles Opera in 2014 and company premieres at Florida Grand Opera, Cincinnati Opera, Opera Colorado, Utah Opera, Washington National Opera, Nashville Opera, Arizona Opera, New York City Opera, the University of Illinois School of Music, Indiana University Jacobs School of Music, and North Carolina Opera. In the 2021-2022 season, it became the first Spanish-language opera to be performed in a mainstage season at the Lyric Opera of Chicago.

The Met Opera performed it for the 2023-24 season, marking the first Spanish language opera in over 100 years on their stage.

== Roles ==
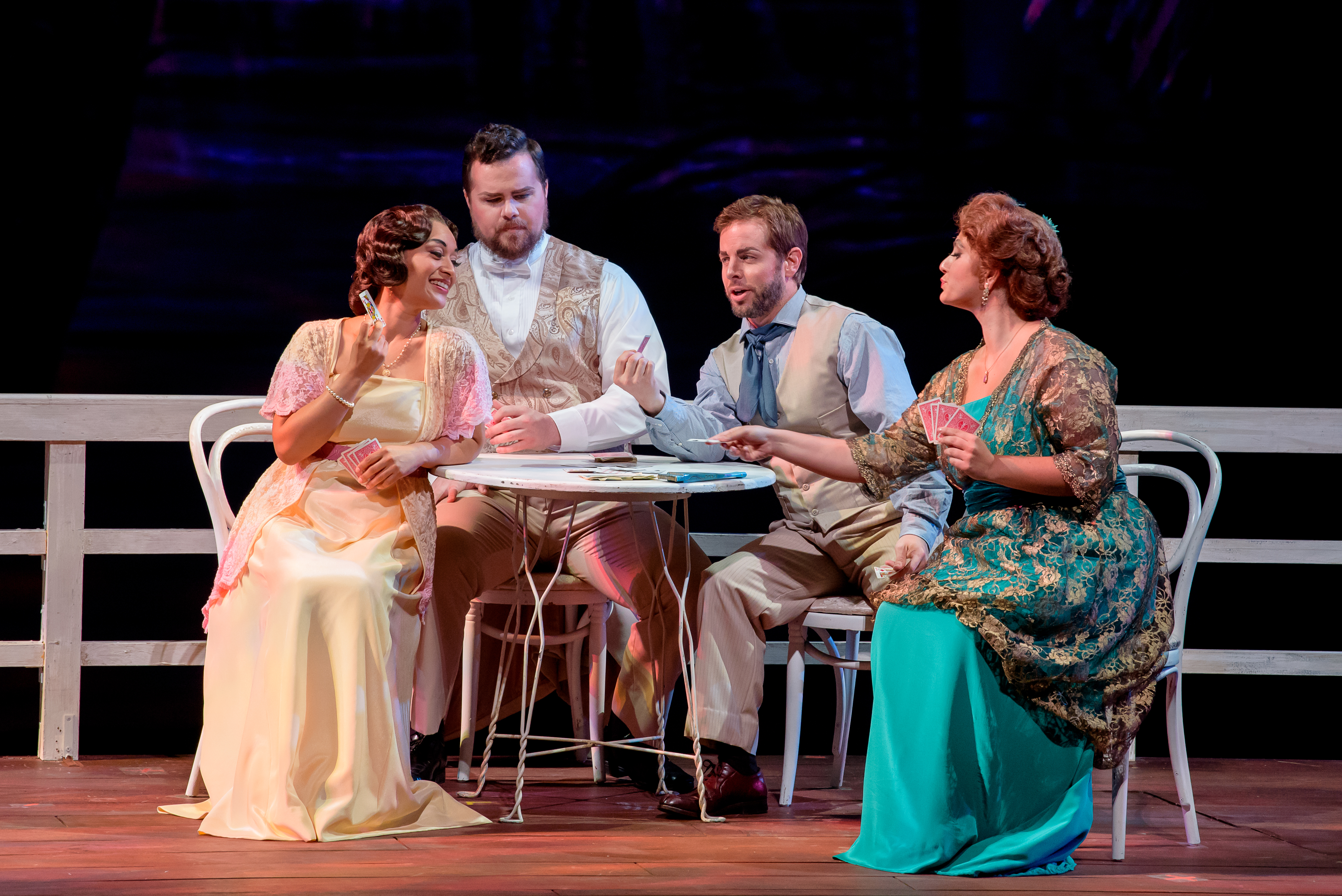
Act I: Rosalba, Alvaro, Arcadio and Paula play cards on the deck of El Dorado

Role	Voice type	Premiere cast, 25 October 1996 (Conductor: Vjekoslav Sutej)
Florencia Grimaldi	soprano	Sheri Greenawald
Rosalba	soprano	Yvonne Gonzales
Paula	mezzo-soprano	Suzanna Guzmán
Arcadio	tenor	Greg Fedderly
Riolobo	baritone	Frank Hernandez
Alvaro	baritone	Hector Vasquez
Capitán	bass	Gabor Andrasy
Chorus

== Synopsis ==
=== Act 1 ===
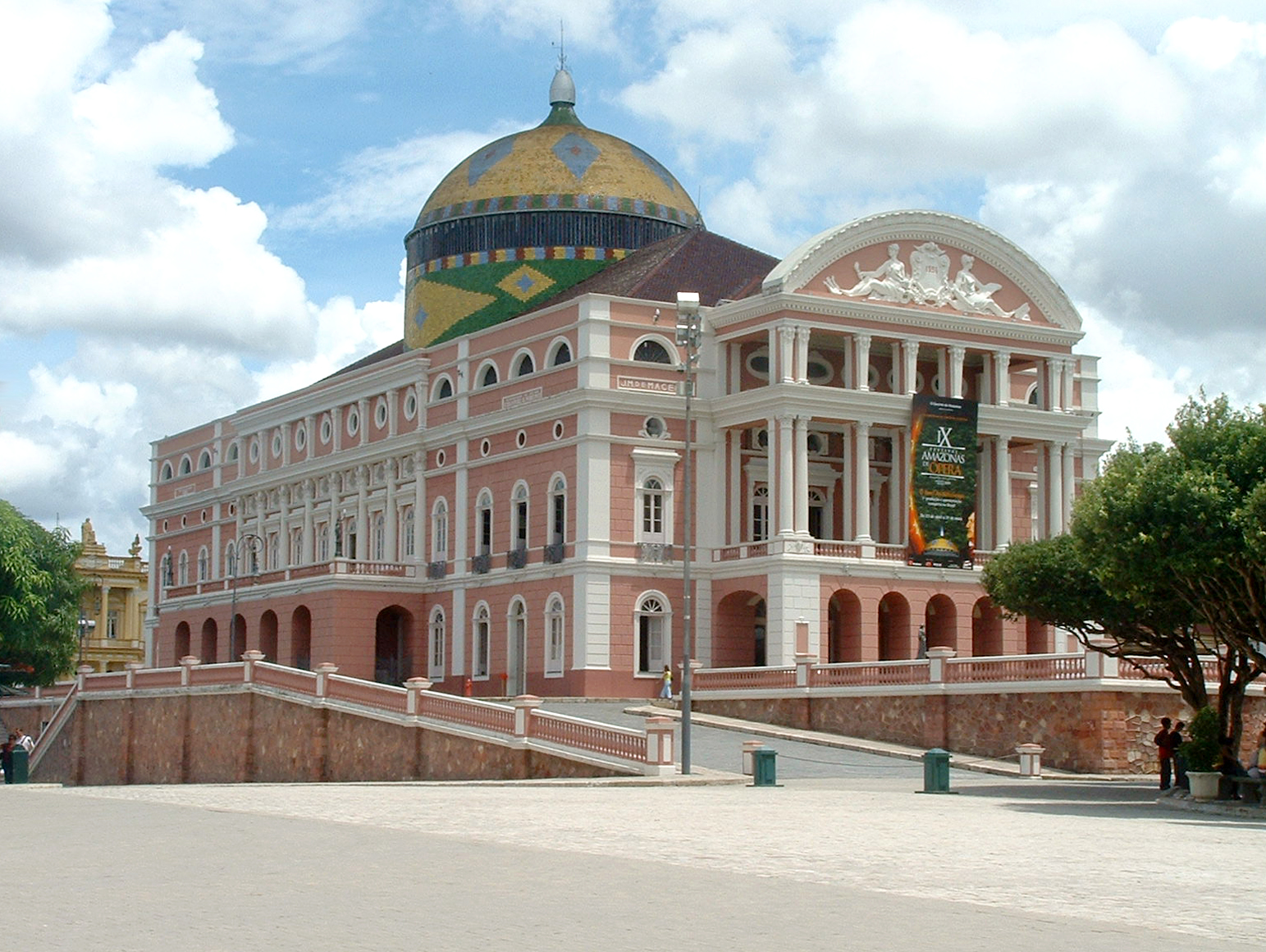
Florencia's destination is the opera house in Manaus

The title character, Florencia Grimaldi, is a famous opera soprano returning to her homeland to sing at the opera house in Manaus with the hope that her performance will attract her lover Cristóbal, a butterfly hunter who has disappeared into the jungle. She boards the steamboat El Dorado for a trip up the Amazon River, along with several passengers who are traveling to hear her sing. The passengers, however, are unaware of her identity. One of them, Rosalba, is a journalist planning to write a book about Grimaldi and hoping to interview her. In preparation, Rosalba has compiled a notebook for two years with information about the diva.

Act 1, Scene 1
Riolobo and Rosalba sing while boarding the El Dorado

Florencia spends her time on the boat brooding about Cristóbal. She does not interact much with the other passengers initially, and the thread connecting the subplots in the story is provided by the ship's mate, Ríolobo, who also is the focus for the elements of magical realism. Ríolobo functions as a narrator, one of the characters, and the intermediary between reality and the mystical world of the river.

Meanwhile, Rosalba is beginning to fall in love with the steamboat captain's nephew, Arcadio, who rescues her notebook when it falls overboard. The two play a card game with Paula and Álvaro, a bickering couple who are also looking forward to Grimaldi's performance. After the game, a storm develops. Álvaro saves the boat but is thrown overboard. With the captain tragically obliterated and Ríolobo having disappeared, Arcadio takes the helm but the ship runs aground. Ríolobo reappears in the form of a river spirit and the storm stops after he calls upon the river gods.

=== Act 2 ===
The characters recover from the storm. Florencia seems to feel Cristóbal's presence and is unsure whether he is alive or dead. Rosalba, focused on her objective, resists the attraction she and Arcadio feel for each other. Meanwhile, Paula, in spite of their constant fighting, recognizes that she still loves Álvaro and mourns his loss. Again Ríolobo appeals to the river and Álvaro is suddenly returned to the ship.

Act 2, Scene 17
Florencia upon learning of the outbreak of cholera in Manaus

In the storm, Rosalba's precious notebook has been lost again, and when it is recovered again it has been ruined by the water. Distraught, Rosalba argues with Florencia about the meaning and value of its contents when suddenly she discovers that the woman she has been arguing with is the very singer she has been longing to interview. Realizing how Florencia draws inspiration from love, Rosalba decides to give in to her feelings for Arcadio.

The boat arrives in Manaus, but a cholera outbreak keeps the passengers quarantined aboard the ship. Florencia despairs of a reunion with Cristóbal, but in the end she is magically transformed into a butterfly, to represent her spirit going off to be reunited with her lover.

== Recordings ==
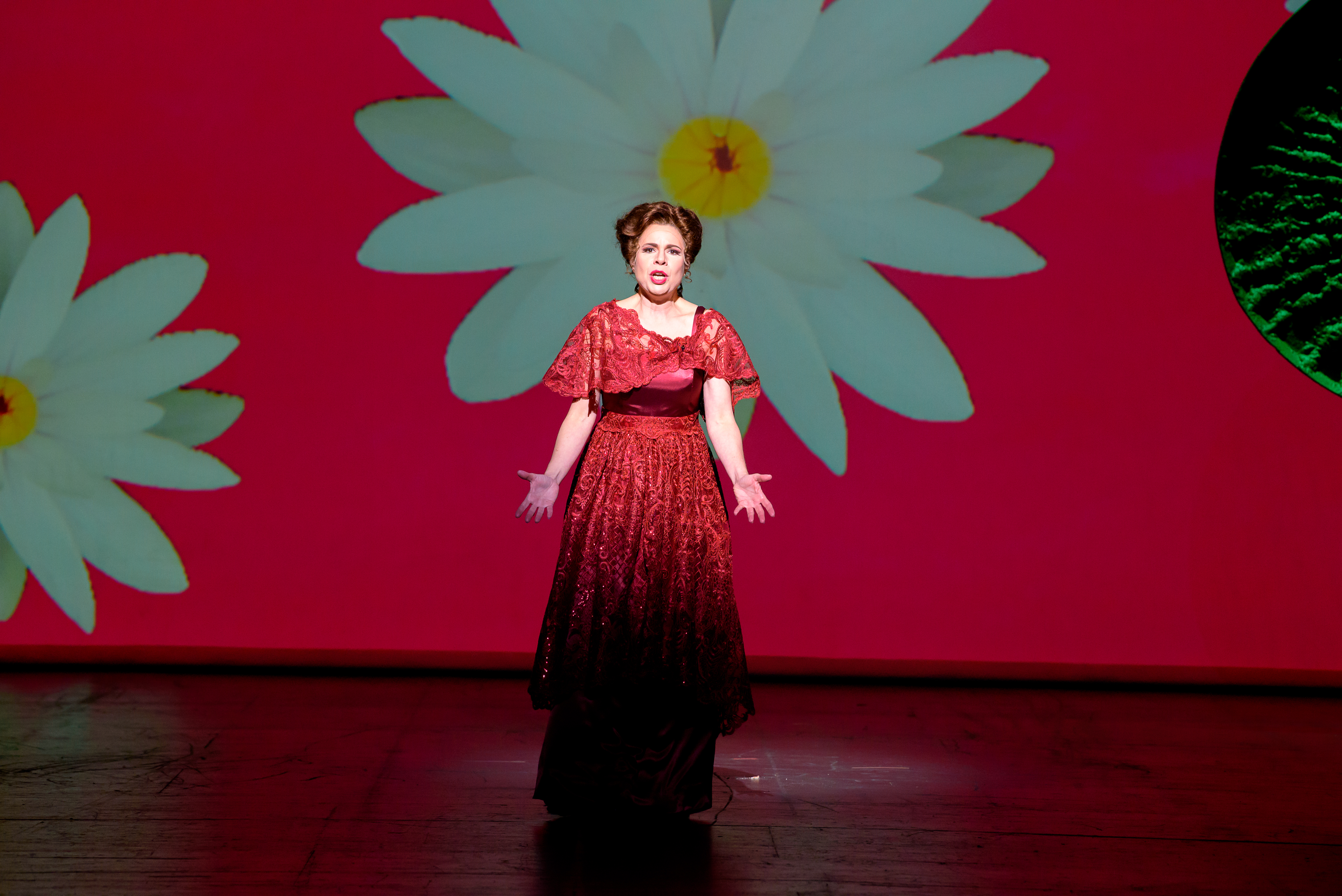
Act II: Florencia begins her transformation

- 2002: Houston Grand Opera, Albany Records. Performance with Patricia Schuman (Florencia), Mark S. Doss (Riolobo), Ana Maria Martinez (Rosalba), Suzanna Guzmán (Paula), Hector Vasquez (Alvaro), Chad Shelton (Arcadio), Oren Gradus (Captain), Patrick Summers (conductor). TROY531-32
