= Store of Knowledge =

Defunct American retail store chain (1994–2001)

Store of Knowledge Inc.
- Industry: Retail
- Founded: August 23, 1993
- Defunct: June 8, 2001
- Fate: Bankruptcy, liquidated
- Headquarters: Cerritos, California, United States
- Products: Toys; educational products
- Owners: KCET; Lakeshore Learning Materials; Riordan, Lewis & Haden
- Website: storeofknowledge.com (archived)

The Store of Knowledge Inc. (SOK) was an American retail chain selling educational items and children's toys. Owned and operated by a company of the same name based in Cerritos, California, SOK was in business between 1994 and 2001. At its closure, it operated 91 stores in 25 states and Washington, D.C.

The majority of SOK stores were operated in association with public television stations in the local areas where they were constructed, though later SOK built or purchased some stores with no public television affiliation. The chain had 27 of these partnerships throughout the United States. Deals with local stations varied but typically involved partial ownership of the store and a share of proceeds, attractive at a time when public stations nationally were looking for new income sources in response to potential federal funding cuts. The chain was co-owned by public television station KCET in Los Angeles; Lakeshore Learning Materials; and private equity firm Riordan, Lewis & Haden.

Despite space in premier malls in major markets and having outlasted rival chain Learningsmith (later acquiring some of its leases), SOK failed at the same time as some of its direct competitors, notably Zany Brainy, amid a soft economy and a downturn in the market for educational children's toys.

== Establishment ==
In 1991, a similar chain known as Learningsmith began operating. Learningsmith had similar connections to public broadcasting elsewhere; Boston's WGBH-TV was a backer, and it also was allied with WNET in New York, WETA-TV in Washington, and WCNY-TV in Syracuse, New York. The chain approached KCET about opening stores and receiving royalties, but the station was more interested in creating its own concept that it would own. Leonard Straus, former chairman of Thrifty Drug and a member of the board of KCET, had suggested the idea of starting an educational materials store. Straus brought in Lakeshore Learning, and the two formulated the concept for the chain. Public television stations would provide community goodwill and a built-in shopper base; Lakeshore supplied merchandising and warehouse services; and Riordan, Lewis & Haden provided the venture capital.

The first store, a 4,500-square-foot (420 m^{2}) unit in the Glendale Galleria in Glendale, California, opened in April 1994. By January 1995, KCET had opened four units in the Los Angeles metro area. While KCET had conceived of the chain as a way to raise money amid a challenging recession in Southern California, threatened cuts to public broadcasting after Republicans took control of the United States House of Representatives in 1994 spurred additional interest. It was also a profitable venture for KCET in its first holiday season.

== National expansion ==
The first units in other markets debuted in 1995. On May 5, SOK and WHYY-TV in Philadelphia opened the first location beyond the KCET area and the first of a planned four area stores at Willow Grove Park Mall. In August, the first two WTTW Stores of Knowledge debuted in Chicago out of a planned eight; in October, a store in alliance with Oregon Public Broadcasting debuted at the Clackamas Town Center in suburban Portland.

As Learningsmith backed off from its previous affiliations with public television and underwent an internal restructuring, two of the large PBS member stations that worked with it started Stores of Knowledge: in October 1996, WNET opened its first unit in the Garden State Plaza, and WETA partnered with the chain to start the first of four units in the Washington, D.C., area in April 1997. There were also two notable holdouts. SOK expanded into the Seattle area even though it was unsuccessful on two occasions to encourage KCTS-TV there to participate; KCTS was already running a for-profit store. It also opened a store at the Wolfchase Galleria in Memphis, Tennessee, though WKNO and SOK never reached an agreement; this was the first non-affiliated store in the chain. Other new markets added in 1996 and 1997 included Atlanta, Kansas City, Miami, Minneapolis (at the Mall of America), and Pittsburgh, while 1998 and 1999 brought new metropolitan areas including Phoenix and Tampa and Orlando, Florida. Between May 1997 and May 1998, the chain's headquarters moved within the Los Angeles area, from Carson to Cerritos.

In 1999, Learningsmith filed for bankruptcy and began liquidating its 87 stores. After contemplating acquiring as many as 64 leases, SOK acquired the leases of 21 units of Learningsmith for $920,000, (~$1.59 million in 2024) reopening the locations as Stores of Knowledge in January 2000. The Learningsmith leases acquired included locations in additional markets where the company did not have ties with the public television station, such as Nashville. In some cases, they expanded the chain's presence in existing markets; the Learningsmith store at MacArthur Center in Norfolk, Virginia, became a Store of Knowledge, joining another in Virginia Beach affiliated with WHRO-TV.

The chain also expressed interest in its final year in expanding its transportation offerings, such as model trains. It attempted to buy the 56-unit Great Train Store chain but failed to reach an accord before the company was liquidated. As a test, it set aside a quarter of the Orland Square Mall store in south suburban Chicago as a "Transportation Station" and considered expanding it into a separate chain of stores. CEO Jim Berk believed that consolidation in the space would leave mall vacancies and that landlords would be receptive to a new concept from an existing retailer.

== Bankruptcy and liquidation ==
In early 2001, the chain began to have cash flow issues after a poor holiday season and began "scrambling for capital", in Berk's words. The manager of the Store of Knowledge in Indianapolis, in association with WFYI, told the Indianapolis Business Journal that the first sign of trouble was when restocking orders were ignored. Additionally, a third attempt within a month to purchase the mall stores of the bankrupt Natural Wonders chain was rejected in March 2001, preventing Store of Knowledge from achieving critical mass in its store base. The failure to acquire the Natural Wonders stores led president and CEO Berk to defer his salary and the chain to defer $2 million in royalty payments to participating stations.

On March 28, 2001, Store of Knowledge filed for Chapter 11 bankruptcy protection. It immediately closed 21 stores on April 1 and began liquidating the remaining 70. The move to wind down the chain came just weeks after Berk told trade publication Gifts & Decorative Accessories that it had no plans to open or close stores in the immediate future. The $30 million (~$50.6 million in 2024) liquidation concluded on June 8, 2001. At the time the chain was slumping, it was part of an overall market trend that also saw a bankruptcy filing for Zany Brainy, increased competition from other retailers, and a decrease in new educational software titles for computers. Kurt Barnard, editor of industry newsletter Barnard's Retail Trend Report, noted that regional shopping malls were not appropriate places for educational toy stores with their high rents and mismatched customer bases.

At bankruptcy auction, the competitor Discovery Channel Store chain acquired 11 leases.

== Public television involvement ==
With the exception of KCET, which owned part of the chain itself and thus benefited financially from the opening of new stores everywhere in the United States, individual public television stations generally owned 15 to 25 percent of the store and received royalties or a one-percent cut of sales. A typical store grossed $2 million a year in sales. In exchange, stations provided promotional assistance. However, some early proceeds went toward expansion of the chain. Stores typically provided information and a telephone connection for prospective new members to the affiliated station.

Annual profits generally ranged from $18,000 to $100,000 a year for stations.

== Partners ==
At the time the chain closed, 27 public television stations were associated with Store of Knowledge. The chain operated 91 stores, of which 12 had no affiliation with a public TV station in their area.

- Connecticut Public Television
- Georgia Public Television
- KAET, Phoenix
- KCET, Los Angeles
- KCPT, Kansas City
- KERA/KDTN, Dallas–Fort Worth
- KETC, St. Louis
- KPBS, San Diego
- KRMA, Denver
- KUHT, Houston
- KTEH, San Jose, California
- KTCA, Minneapolis
- Oregon Public Broadcasting
- WCET, Cincinnati
- WEDU, Tampa
- WETA-TV, Washington, D.C.
- WFYI, Indianapolis
- WHYY-TV, Philadelphia
- WKOP-TV, Knoxville, Tennessee
- WHRO-TV, Hampton/Norfolk, Virginia
- WMFE-TV, Orlando
- WNET, New York
- WPBT, Miami
- WQED, Pittsburgh
- WTTW, Chicago
- WTVS, Detroit
- WVIZ, Cleveland
