= Charles Best (businessman) =

American philanthropist and entrepreneur

Charles Best is an American philanthropist and entrepreneur. He is the founder and CEO of DonorsChoose.org, a crowdfunding platform for K-12 teachers serving in US schools, and the founder of Irregardless, a crowd-sourced writing style guide. In 2023 he became the CEO of Lakeshore Learning, a chain of educational supply stores.

== Education ==
Best attended high school at St. Paul's School, a boarding school in New Hampshire. Best graduated Phi Beta Kappa from Yale College in 1998. He also holds a certificate in fundraising management from the Harvard Kennedy School.

== Career ==
Two years after his college graduation, Best launched DonorsChoose.org while serving as a high school history teacher in the Bronx. Best founded the organization after seeing first-hand the limited resources and opportunities available in his school. The site allows teachers to post project requests for classroom supplies, resources, field trips and class visitors. Once donors fully fund a project, DonorsChoose.org fulfills the project request by purchasing the materials and shipping them to the classroom. By 2014, more than half of all US public schools had at least one teacher create a project request on DonorsChoose.org, and more than a million people gave over $200 million to classroom projects reaching 10 million students.

== Awards and honors ==
Oprah Winfrey named DonorsChoose.org one of her "Ultimate Favorite Things" in 2010. In 2011 and 2014 Fast Company named Best's organization one of the "50 Most Innovative Companies in the World," making it the first charity ever to receive this recognition.

Fortune magazine named Best to its "40 under 40 hottest rising stars in business" for three consecutive years. In November 2013, he received the John F. Kennedy New Frontier Award, an honor for young Americans who are changing their communities and country through their commitment to public service. (Past recipients include Wendy Kopp and Cory Booker.) In 2014, Best received the S. Roger Horchow for Greatest Public Service by a Private Citizen as part of the Jefferson Awards.

Best was named an Ashoka Fellow in 2006. Fellows are leading social entrepreneurs recognized for their innovative solutions to social problems and potential to change patterns across society.

Best has also served on the board of directors for GuideStar and iMentor.
