= A Place of Our Own =

- Genre: Child care
- Directed by: Hal Grant
- Starring: Debi Gutierrez (1998-2007); Elizabeth Sanchez (2008-2011); Alina Rosario (Los Niños en Su Casa)
- Narrated by: B.B. King
- Country of origin: United States
- Original language: English
- No. of seasons: 4
- No. of episodes: 100

Production
- Executive producers: Stephanie Drachkovitch and Mary Mazur
- Producer: Rasha Drachkovitch
- Production location: Los Angeles, California
- Camera setup: Multi-camera
- Running time: 30 minutes
- Production companies: 44 Blue Productions; KCET Los Angeles

Original release
- Network: PBS, V-me
- Release: January 3, 1998 – December 30, 2011

A Place of Our Own is a daily program about child care that airs on PBS, produced in Los Angeles by KCET. It was hosted by Debi Gutierrez and has been recently hosted by Elizabeth Sanchez. The Spanish-language version is Los Niños en Su Casa ("Our Children at Home"), seen on PBS and on the Spanish-language public television network V-me. Their version is hosted by Alina Rosario.

The show was produced by KCET in association with 44 Blue Productions.

The tagline is "You are your child's first teacher".

Friday editions feature a "Week in Review", about the daily week, Monday-Thursday, similar to the review on Learn to Read. As is, people send letters to KCET, or email to Debi Gutierrez/Elizabeth Sanchez of A Place of Our Own or Alina Rosario of Los Niños en Su Casa.

It won a Peabody Award in 2005.

== DVD release ==
Between 2008 and 2009, PBS Home Video began releasing A Place of Our Own on DVD.

- Early Childhood Solutions: Early Academics (June 24, 2008)
- Early Childhood Solutions: Health and Nutrition (November 18, 2008)
- Early Childhood Solutions: Special Needs (February 24, 2009)
