= DonorsChoose =

American nonprofit organization

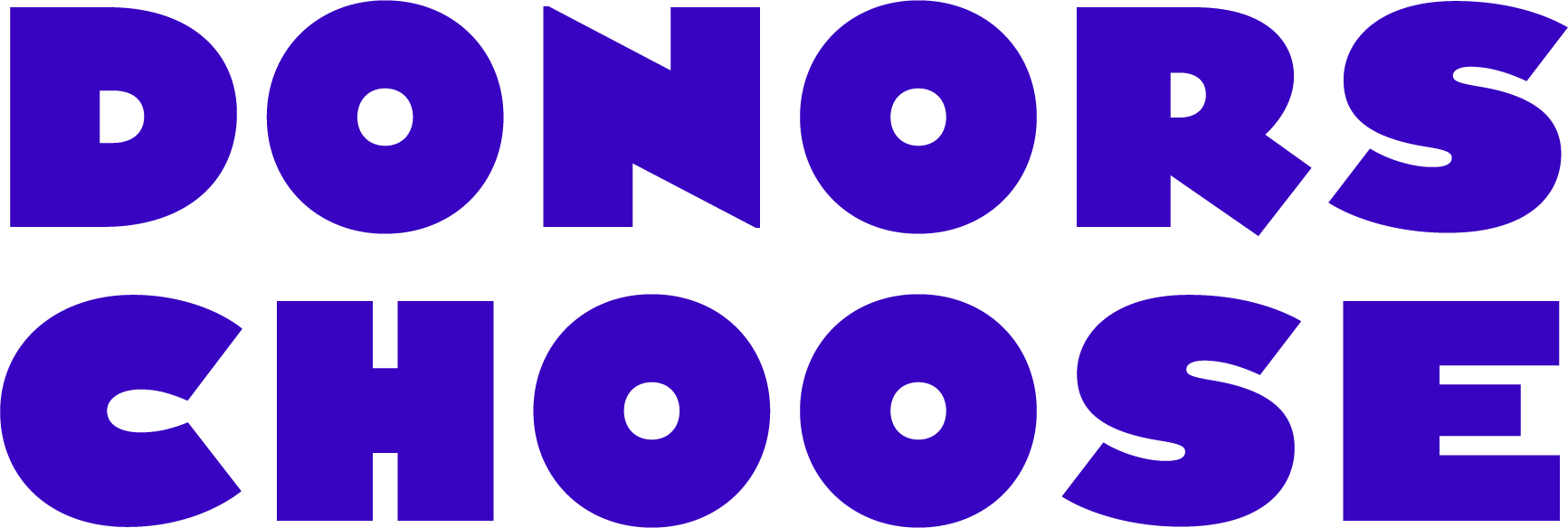
- Type: Non-profit organization
- Founded: March 26, 2000; 26 years ago
- Founder: Charles Best
- Headquarters: New York City, New York, U.S.
- Revenue: $155,729,939(2023)
- Total assets: 131,250,039 United States dollar (2022)
- Number of employees: 115
- Website: www.donorschoose.org

DonorsChoose is a United States–based nonprofit organization that allows individuals to donate directly to public school classroom projects. The organization has been given Charity Navigator's highest rating every year since 2005. As of June 2024, the organization had funded 2.95 million projects and raised $1.64 billion for teachers and students. 88% of public schools in the United States had requested at least one project on DonorsChoose. Schools from wealthy areas are more likely to make technology requests, while schools from less affluent areas are more likely to request basic supplies. It has been noted that repeat donors on DonorsChoose typically donate to projects they have no prior relationship with, and most often fund projects serving financially challenged students.

== History ==
DonorsChoose was founded in 2000 by Charles Best, a social studies teacher at Wings Academy in The Bronx. Charles and his colleagues often spent their own money on school supplies for their students, and discussed materials they wished they could afford in the teachers' lunchroom. With the help of his students, he built the first version of the site in his classroom and invited colleagues to post material requests.

In 2003, The Oprah Winfrey Show featured Charles Best in a segment on Innovative Teachers, which aired on June 20. Traffic generated from the show crashed the site, and viewers donated $250,000 to classroom projects. In 2006, following the destruction of hurricanes Katrina and Rita, the site opened to public school teachers in Louisiana, Mississippi, Alabama, and Texas. In 2007, the site opened to every public school in the United States. As of June 2024, donors have contributed over $1.64 billion to fund more than 2.95 million classroom projects posted on the site, supporting 889,169 teachers in public schools across the United States. Real-time impact statistics are available on the DonorsChoose impact page and open-source classroom data is offered to developers.

== Background ==
DonorsChoose enables teachers to request materials and resources for their classrooms and makes these project requests available to individual donors through its website. Donors can give $1 or more to projects that interest them, which are searchable by school name, teacher name, location, school subject, material, and keywords. DonorsChoose then purchases necessary supplies and ships them directly to the schools. Every project contains a line-item budget and a description of the project. All donors receive photographs of the project taking place in the classroom and a letter from the teacher. Donors who contribute $50 or more to a project also receive hand-written thank-you notes from students. Stephen Colbert has promoted DonorsChoose and has a position on the board.

The operations of DonorsChoose are 100% supported by an optional 15% donation to overhead, teacher outreach, maintenance and build-out of the DonorsChoose website. 84% of individual donors opt to include this donation.

DonorsChoose national corporate and foundation partners include The Bill & Melinda Gates Foundation, Google.org, PNC Bank, Staples, and Target.

== Eligibility ==
DonorsChoose is open to all public and public charter schools in the United States, as well as GED and Pre-K programs run by public school systems.

All "front line educators" are eligible to create accounts on the site and submit project requests. This includes teachers, librarians, guidance counselors, school nurses and full-time teachers who also act as coaches – all must work directly with students for 75% or more of their time. Those who are not eligible include principals, administrators, PTA members, teachers' assistants, student teachers, substitutes, part-time teachers, after-school teachers, or staff developers.

== Press ==
DonorsChoose appeared in a Doonesbury strip on September 9, 2007.

It was mentioned in an interview with Craig Newmark on the October 18, 2007, episode of the Colbert Report, and again on March 19, 2008; September 27, 2011; and December 13, 2012, as a recipient of host Stephen Colbert's Super PAC Americans for a Better Tomorrow, Tomorrow.

Charles Best spoke at the first annual Forbes 400 Summit On Philanthropy in June 2012.

In May 2013, DonorsChoose mobilized donations in support of educators in Moore, Oklahoma, whose schools were devastated by an EF5 Tornado. CBS featured DonorsChoose as a trusted organization assisting the relief effort in Oklahoma.

Fast Company magazine featured DonorsChoose as one of its Most Innovative Companies in 2011 and 2019. DonorsChoose was the first charity to be given this distinction. In February 2014, DonorsChoose was listed in the top 10 Most Innovative Companies, and the organization was featured as February's cover story.

Maya Kosoff wrote about how teachers use DonorsChoose to fundraise for Texas Instruments graphing calculators.

As of June 2024, more than 11,000 School districts are part of the DonorsChoose District Partnership Program. Hamilton County Schools have announced a new partnership with DonorsChoose.

Flash-funding has been occasionally used to fund all projects on DonorsChoose in a geographic area.
