= Lakeshore Learning Materials =

Chain of educational supply stores

- Industry: K-12 educational supply Early childhood development industry
- Founded: 1954 in Carson, California, U.S.
- Founder: Ethelyn Kaplan
- Number of locations: 60
- Key people: Charles Best (CEO); Bo Kaplan (President and CEO prior to 2023); Dan Klink (CFO); Kelli Miller (CPO); Kevin Carnes (PED); Jarrett Klein (CCO); Seth Zimmerman (CMCO); Steve Rosenberg (CIO); Jennifer Centazzo (COO)
- Owner: Leonard Green & Partners
- Number of employees: 3,500
- Website: www.lakeshorelearning.com

Lakeshore Learning Materials is a chain of educational supply stores. The company is one of the largest retail and online suppliers of educational materials to teachers with more than 60 stores in 29 states. The company is based in Carson, California and employs more than 2000 people.

Lakeshore Learning Materials was founded in 1954 by Ethelyn Kaplan. She opened a toy store on Lakeshore Avenue in Oakland, California, which inspired the name of the company. The store was modestly successful but after Kaplan noticed that one teacher purchased five puzzles she decided to sell the store and start a new company in San Leandro, California that focused solely on educational products. Her sons Charles and Michael joined the company in 1967 and 1971 and Ethelyn retired four years later. Her grandson Bo Kaplan became CEO in 2009. In 2023, Bo Kaplan transitioned to Executive Chairman and Charles Best became CEO.

"Our niche is institutions", former CEO Charlie Kaplan told the Los Angeles Times in 1995. "When we get parents, we're delighted, but we are set up for schools". Around 70% of the company's products are private label and developed in-house. In 1994, the company partnered with public television station KCET to open the Store of Knowledge, a retail shop selling educational toys and products at the Glendale Galleria.
