= Suzanna Guzmán =

American opera singer

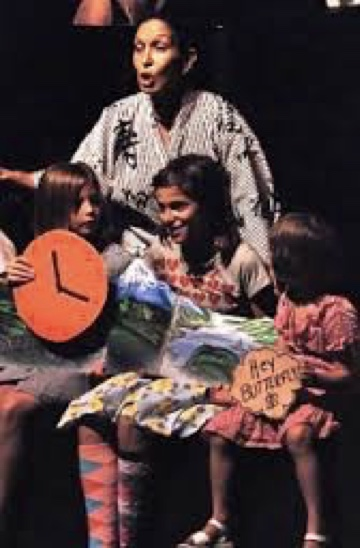
Un Bel Di with picture titles

Suzanna Guzmán (East Los Angeles, California) is an American mezzo-soprano, actress, radio host and a two time Los Angeles Area Emmy Award winning television host for PBS SoCal. An established professional performer since 1982 she has performed as a principal opera and musical theatre performer with The Kennedy Center, Washington National Opera, Dallas Opera, Houston Grand Opera, San Diego Opera and most notably with Los Angeles Opera where she was recognized as a 2025 Hispanic Legend of Opera and an Los Angeles Opera Legacy Ambassador.

Hello San Fernando Valley

Guzmán is known for her work in contemporary opera and premiering new roles including Paula in Daniel Catan's Florencia en el Amazonas, Lucha in Yuval Sharon's mobile opera Hopscotch for The Industry Opera, Duchess of Alba in Giancarlo Menotti's Goya, Mrs. Fox in Tobias Picker's Fantastic Mr. Fox. Best known for her portrayal of the title role in Bizet's Carmen, a role she has performed in venues around the world in nearly 300 performances, she best known for her appearance with Houston Grand Opera's multi-media production popularly known as the MTV Carmen.

Freezing in the wings

A two-time Grammy Award nominee, Guzmán was nominated with Tambucco Percussion Emsemble and Southwest Chamber Music for their recording of Carlos Chavez Vol. III. She is also known for her work as a television and radio host including

KCET/PBS SoCal's weekly series OPEN CALL. Recent appearances include the Dowager Empress for Tuacahn Amphitheatre and McCoy Rigby productions and Abuela Claudia with Musical Theatre West.

== Biography ==
She made her stage debut in 1982 with the Bilingual Foundation of the Arts in a touring company of Se Necesíta Costureras con Experiencia with Dame Carmen Zapata. Later that year she became a member of San Diego's Old Globe Theater's Educational Tour under Craig Noel, David McClellan and Jack O'Brien. She began her career in Musical Theatre with California regional companies (Sacramento Music Circus, Lyric Dinner Theatre, Grand Dinner Theatre) and appeared in the role of Amazon No. 2 with Yul Brynner on his final national tour and 4000th performance of The King and I, and Carousel directed by Jamie Hammerstein conducted by John Mauceri at the Kennedy Center. She gained entrance to opera as winner of several competitions, San Francisco Opera, Guild Opera, Fuchs, Zachary and in 1985 she entered the Metropolitan Opera Competition, and tied for first place of the Western Region with Deborah Voigt. As a national finalist, she met two important impresarios: Ian Campbell (San Diego Opera) and Francis Rizzo, (Washington Opera). In 1985 she made her operatic debut as the voice of Antonia's Mother in San Diego Opera's production of The Tales of Hoffmann starring Nelly Miricioiu, James Morris, Judith Forst and conducted by Theo Alcántara and sang as a principal artist nearly every season from 1985 through her last performance with them in 2012 as the Page in Salome with Lise Lindstrom. Performances in San Diego have included:

- Maddalena in Rigoletto
- Eunice in A Streetcar Named Desire
- Cornelia in Giulio Cesare
- Third Lady in The Magic Flute
- Suzuki in Madama Butterfly with Patricia Racette

Concurrently it was Frank Rizzo of Washington Opera who hired her for ten consecutive seasons with Washington Opera including a successful run as the title role in Carmen. It was there, at the Kennedy Center, that she first worked with the opera composer/director Giancarlo Menotti on his new opera Goya, broadcast live for PBS (with Plácido Domingo), which led to further collaborations including new productions of The Saint of Bleecker Street, and Amahl and the Night Visitors, for which she was nominated for a Helen Hayes Award for Outstanding Lead Actress.

In 1987 she was named an Associate Artist of the Los Angeles Opera by Peter Hemmings; her roles there include:

- Peep Bo in The Mikado (directed by Jonathan Miller with Dudley Moore),
- Maiden 5 in Elektra (Leonie Rysanek),
- Dorabella in Cosi Fan Tutte,
- Isaura in Tancredi (Marilyn Horne, Henry Lewis conductor)
- La Gitana in El Gato Montés starring Plácido Domingo,
- Mrs. Fox in Tobias Picker's world premiere of Roald Dahls' Fantastic Mr. Fox,
- Third Lady in the Gerald Scharfe production of Magic Flute,
- Berta in Barber of Seville directed by John Copley with Federica Von Stade, Raul Jimenez, also with Jennifer Larrimore and John Del Carlo
- Cornelia with Giulio Cesare (with David Daniels, Bejun Mehta, Elizabeth Futral)
- Wokle in Fanciulla del West with Catherine Malfitano as Minnie
- Mrs.Page in Falstaff with Ashley Putnum, Greg Fedderly and Stephanie Blythe
- Peter Grimes with Phillip Langridge and Nancy Gustafson, directed by the John Schlessinger, conducted by Mstislav Rostropovich
- The Governess in Pique Dame with Plácido Domingo, Elena Obratsova, Valery Gerghiev,
- Suzuki in Madama Butterfly with Catherine Malfitano, and later with Yoko Watanabe,
- Diana in Orpheus in the Underworld with Peter Mark Shifter, Dom DeLuise, Tracy Dahl, John de Main conducting,
- Flora in La Traviata with Renée Fleming, Elizabeth Futral, and Ana Maria Martinez, directed by Marta Domingo,
- Gertrude in Romeo et Juliette with Rolando Villazon and Anna Netrebko,
- Charlotte The Grand Duchess of Gerolstein directed by Garry Marshall starring Federica von Stade
- La Mulata de Cordoba in Journey to Cordoba by Lee Holdridge with set design by Gronk and costume design by Victoria Petrovich, also starring Danielle DeNiese
- Natasha in Les Moose, the Operatic Adventures of Rocky and Bullwinkle with Eli Villanueva written by Alan Chapman
- La Ciesca in Gianni Schicchi directed by William Friedkin, starring Sam Ramey, Ros Elias, Jessica Rivera, Rolando Villazon,
- Siebel in Faust with Veronica Villaroel and Sam Ramey,
- Marcellina in Marriage of Figaro with Sir Thomas Allen, Solvieg Kringleborn, Richard Bernstein. Also with Rod Gilfry and Michael Gallup
- Frau Mary in Flying Dutchman with Greg Fedderly and directed by Julie Taymor,
- Paula in Daniel Catán's Florencia en el Amazonas
- Mariana in Luisa Fernanda with Plácido Domingo directed by Emilio Sagi
- Annina in Der Rosenkavalier with Ashley Putnam, Federica von Stade, directed by Jonathan Miller,

Her work with opera directors include: Giancarlo Menotti, John Schlessinger, William Friedkin, Garry Marshall, Francesca Zambello, Franco Zeffirelli, Jonathan Miller, John Copley, Sir Peter Hall, and Robert Wilson; and with composers: Jake Heggie, Dead Man Walking the opera; Tobias Picker (Fantastic Mr. Fox), Daniel Catán (Florencia en el Amazonas), Cliff Eidelmann (Wedding in the Night Garden), Ian Krouse (Lorca, Child of the Moon), Richard Rodgers Melnick (Chinese Cabaret), and Lee Holdridge (Journey to Córdoba and Concierto para Mendez) She is on the 2026-27 roster of the [Los Angeles Music Center Education Division] and continues performing for the Los Angeles Opera Education Department and hosting events for the Music Center (Music Center Spotlight Awards, Very Special Arts Festival) .

She hosted for nine seasons (1994–2003) the weekly radio broadcast L.A. Opera Notes co-hosting first with radio legend Rich Capparela and later with Los Angeles favorite, baritone Rod Gilfry Mount Wilson Productions. Later she appeared for three seasons as producer, writer and host of Sunday Evening Opera. and from 2019-2021 she returned to KMZT as host of The Opera Hour. She serves on the USC Thornton School of Music Board of Mentors, Curt Branom's Pacific Artists and Singers workshop PACSAW, and on the Board of The Neighborhood Music School in East Los Angeles. Her one-woman show, Don't Be Afraid: It's Just Opera, was created in 1984 to introduce inner city children to the world of opera. She continues those performances and has appeared in schools and community centers across the United States.

In 1985 she appeared on the Bert Convy-hosted Super Password, where she won $1,500. She also appeared on the Match Game Hollywood Squares Hour in January 1984, but did not win the Match Game segment and so did not advance. In 2024 she returned to Password as a contestant with partner Jimmy Fallon and KiKi Palmer as host.

== Discography ==
- Carlos Chavez Volume 3 (soloist)
  - Grammy nominated (Best Classical CD, Best Classical Small Ensemble)
  - Latin Grammy Nominated
  - Southwest Chamber Music
  - Tambuco Percussion Ensemble with Alba Quezada
  - Cambria (1 CD) CD 8852
- Three Friends: Music of Ian Krouse (soloist)
  - The Debussy Trio
  - Ian Krouse, composer
  - Marcia Dickstein, conductor
  - Rubeda Canis Musica (1 CA) B000050AE1
  - US Release September 4, 2001
- Florencia en el Amazonas - original cast recording(Paula)
  - Daniel Catán, composer
  - Patrick Summers, conductor with Ana Maria Martinez, Patricia Schumann, Chad Shelton…
  - Houston Grand Opera Orchestra
  - Albany Record (2 CD) TROY 531/532
  - US Release September 2002
- Goya (Duchess of Alba)
  - Giancarlo Menotti, composer
  - Steven Mercurio, conductor with Cesar Hernandez, Andrew Wentzel, Penelope Daner
  - Spoleto Festival Orchestra
  - ICARUS Nuova Era (2 CD) 7060/61
  - Italy release April 1992
  - US re release Copa d'Oro Records

=== Filmography/television ===
60th Annual Los Angeles County Holiday Celebration - host 2019 Emmy Award Best Live Event Winner https://www.emmys.com/

- OPEN CALL Host 2012 KCET/PBS SO Cal Los Angeles
- CSI: New York ("Murder Sings the Blues") (2006) Madame Butterfly
  - Directed by Oz Scott
- Twilight of the Golds (1997) Brünnhilde
  - Directed by Ross Kagan Marks
  - Written by Jonathan Tolins
- Courage: Profiles in Creativity (1998 documentary) Herself
  - Directed by Deanna McDaniels
- Suzanna Guzmán – Native Angelena: Voice of an Angel (2002) Herself
  - Associated Press Award Best Short Profile
  - Producer Gay Yee
  - Host Val Zavala for PBS LIFE AND TIMES
- El Gato Montes (1995) Gypsy woman
  - Directed by Emilio Sagi

== Sources ==
- Breslauer, Jan, "A Perfect Fit", Los Angeles Times 5 February 1995
- Crutchfield, Will, "A Mezzo-Soprano in Debut", New York Times, 4 May 1989, p. C28
- McNamara, Mary, Cover Story: Almost A Diva, Los Angeles Times Magazine, 7 March 1999, p. 12
- Metropolitan Opera, Performance record: Guzman, Suzanna (Mezzo Soprano) on the MetOpera Database
