= America's Heartland =

Television series

- Presented by: Jason Shoultz; Rob Stewart; Sarah Gardner; Dave Lieberman; Paul Robbins; Akiba Howard
- Theme music composer: Michael Martin Murphey; Rob Quist
- Opening theme: "Close to the Land"
- Country of origin: United States
- Original language: English
- No. of seasons: 18
- No. of episodes: 345

Production
- Camera setup: Brad White; Steve Riggs; Martin Christian; Jeff Cooper
- Running time: 26 minutes
- Production company: KVIE

Original release
- Network: Syndication
- Release: September 24, 2005 – present

America's Heartland is a television program in the United States airing on public television since 2005. Produced by KVIE Sacramento, America's Heartland reporters and crews have brought in stories from all across the United States as well as faraway places like Taiwan, China, Egypt and Morocco.

== Description ==
The program features profiles of farming and ranching families and explores trends in food production from farm-to-table. America's Heartland also features a "Farm to Fork" segment hosted by well-known CNET personality and blogger Sharon Profis. Profis joins farmers in their own kitchens, preparing recipes with ingredients grown on that farm. Other recurring segments include "Harvesting Knowledge", highlighting the history of familiar food production, "Off the Shelf" featuring information about items found right in the grocery store, and "Agriculture 101," where agriculture experts answer questions posed by consumers.

The program has featured several "themed" episodes. In 2008, Jason Shoultz explored overseas grain trade in China and Taiwan in a special entitled "Journey of the Corn." In 2009, the program took viewers to Egypt and Morocco to explore overseas programs designed to grow export markets for corn and wheat. Themed episodes include "Dawn to Dusk," following a North Dakota farming family throughout a busy day, "The Miracle Bean," exploring the many uses of soybeans grown in the U.S., "Cowboy Cattle Drive" taking viewers on a three-day cattle drive in the Utah mountains. The program has also featured state-themed shows in Hawaii, Alaska and Texas.

== Production and history ==
Sponsors are the United Soybean Board, Farm Credit, and the American Farm Bureau Foundation for Agriculture. In 2011, the "Fund for Agriculture Education" was created, providing businesses and organizations an opportunity to contribute to show production funding.

The series is a national evolution of California Heartland, which covered California agriculture and aired for nine seasons on KVIE. The show airs weekly on public television stations across the US, on the cable/satellite channel RFD-TV, and on commercial television stations (including the World Harvest Television, NewsNet, The Country Network, Heartland, Circle and TBD subchannel networks) to meet educational children's programming requirements. Shows and segments can also be viewed on the program's website and the YouTube channel. America's Heartland also maintains a strong social media presence on Facebook and Twitter. The show's theme song "Close to the Land" was written by Michael Martin Murphey and Rob Quist and performed by Michael Martin Murphey.

== Hosts ==
Current Hosts:

- Jason Shoultz
- Rob Stewart
- Sarah Gardner
- Paul Robbins
- Sharon Vaknin

Former Hosts:

- Paul Ryan
- Pat McConahay
- Yolanda Vazquez
- Jon Lobertini
- Amy Henry
- Dave Lieberman
- Akiba Howard
- Kristen Simoes
