= California Connected =

- Genre: News
- Presented by: David Brancaccio; Lisa McRee
- Theme music composer: Christopher Cross and Stephen Bray
- Country of origin: United States
- Original language: English
- No. of seasons: 5

Production
- Production companies: KCET, KQED, KVIE, and KPBS

Original release
- Release: 2002 – 2007

California Connected was a television newsmagazine that broadcast stories about the state of California to "increase civic engagement." The show was created by Marley Klaus and aired on twelve PBS member stations throughout California. In 2006, former NBC producer Bret Marcus took over as executive producer. The program was cancelled in 2007 due to a lack of funding.

The program debuted in 2002 with host David Brancaccio; he anchored the show from the Los Angeles studios of PBS station KCET. Lisa McRee replaced Brancaccio in 2004. Rather than anchor from a television studio, McRee hosted the show from a different Californian location each week. A total of 154 episodes were taped.

"California Connected" won more than 65 regional and national awards and, in 2007, the program won its first Alfred I. duPont-Columbia University Award for Excellence in Broadcast Journalism for a story titled, War Stories From Ward 7-D.

California Connected was co-produced by the following four PBS stations: KCET in Los Angeles, KQED in San Francisco, KVIE in Sacramento, and KPBS in San Diego. The theme music was written by Christopher Cross and Stephen Bray. Major funding came from: the James Irvine Foundation, the Hewlett Foundation, The California Endowment, and the Annenberg Foundation.

California Connected will continue to provide access to its website, audio files, videos, blog, and RSS feed.
