= KVIE =

Television station in Sacramento, California

- Sacramento–Stockton–Modesto, California; United States
- City: Sacramento, California
- Channels: Digital: 9 (VHF); Virtual: 6
- Branding: PBS KVIE

Programming
- Affiliations: 6.1: PBS; for others, see § Subchannels

Ownership
- Owner: KVIE, Inc.

History
- First air date: February 23, 1959
- Former channel numbers: Analog: 6 (VHF, 1959–2009)
- Former affiliations: NET (1959–1970)
- Call sign meaning: "Valley Information and Education"; contains VI, the Roman numeral for 6

Technical information
- Licensing authority: FCC
- Facility ID: 35855
- ERP: 33 kW
- HAAT: 596.8 m (1,958 ft)
- Transmitter coordinates: 38°16′18″N 121°30′18″W

Links
- Public license information: Public file; LMS
- Website: www.kvie.org

KVIE (channel 6) is a PBS member television station in Sacramento, California, United States. The station is owned by KVIE, Inc., a community-based non-profit organization. KVIE's studios are located on West El Camino Avenue in the Natomas district of Sacramento, and its transmitter is located in Walnut Grove, California.

After years of interest in educational television in the Sacramento area, KVIE began broadcasting in February 1959, airing evening educational programs from PBS predecessor National Educational Television and daytime instructional output for schools. Originally located in studios in Sacramento used by a previous UHF station that had become outdated and run down by the 1980s, KVIE relocated to its present studios in 1990. KVIE's local programming has focused on topics including agriculture and activity at the California state capitol.

== History ==
=== Construction ===
Channel 6 was allocated for educational use in Sacramento in 1952 after the Federal Communications Commission (FCC) lifted its four-year freeze on new TV station applications in 1952. The next year, the first interest was expressed in the educational channel by a consortium of school officials in 15 Superior California counties. In 1955, it joined forces with a similar group in the Stockton area, the Delta-Sierra Educational Television Corporation, after previously forming a joint study committee with the Stockton group. The combined group, Central California Educational Television (CCET), had board members from Ceres in the south to Chico in the north and represented a total of 20 counties. Both groups continued to also exist separately.

In October 1957, CCET approved a fundraising project to raise necessary money for staffing. The fund drive needed to raise money from the community to support matching funds from the Fund for Adult Education; John C. Crabbe, one of KVIE's founders, traveled the region and gave 92 speeches in 90 days. This drive raised $205,000, enough to qualify for the matching funds. In April, KOVR extended an offer to the station, which was accepted, to use facilities it had acquired when it purchased the assets of UHF station KCCC-TV the year prior on Garden Highway; KOVR would also carry demonstration programs to present educational television to the area until the station launched.

The FCC granted CCET a construction permit on July 30, 1958. The consortium invited proposals for call signs, selecting KVIE (for "Valley Information and Education" as well as containing VI, the Roman numeral for 6). The pilot programs on KOVR ended in December 1958 in preparation for the launch of channel 6.

=== Early years ===
KVIE began broadcasting on February 23, 1959, with evening educational programming. The first educational programs for schools were broadcast at the end of March. In 1964, KIXE-TV began broadcasting to the Northstate; KVIE programs were received by microwave at Chico State College, local programs and identifications were added, and the result was transmitted to the region. Founding manager and director John C. Crabbe resigned in 1968 at the request of the board of directors over budgetary issues; this was later rescinded, and he resigned the next year instead. While bickering with the consortium of schools using its instructional programming and financial issues confronted KVIE at this time, 1970 also saw the station move its transmitter to Walnut Grove, giving its broadcasts parity with the market's three VHF commercial stations. Previously, limited power and the orientation of many Sacramento-area TV antennas away from KVIE's transmitter near Placerville and toward Walnut Grove hindered reception.

KVIE steadily increased its local programming. Most of its early efforts centered around activities at the state capitol. The station televised the full 14-hour death penalty hearing for Caryl Chessman, a man who was convicted for a series of crimes in the late 1940s, and also aired governors' press conferences and legislative hearings at a time when longform coverage of such events was rare on television.

The 1970s were turbulent times for station leadership. Art Paul succeeded Crabbe in 1970, and while he was successful at managing KVIE's finances—an issue in Crabbe's last years—station board members desired to increase local programming, and there were objections to several decisions and use of station funds. The board of directors recommended not rehiring Paul when his contract expired. Instructional programs also went by the wayside in 1978 as a result of Proposition 13, which capped and reduced property taxes and severely restricted new tax increases; schools could no longer afford the programs as a result of declining tax receipts.

Under John Hershberger, general manager from 1979 to 1994, KVIE renewed its emphasis on local program production, which had been a sore point under Paul. KVIE supporter organization Friends of Six, in a unique attempt to help raise funds for the station, opened At Six, a restaurant in the Sierra 2 performing arts center. The cafe lasted a year, beset by management turnover and poor advertising, and its closure left the station out $35,000 in money it gave for setup costs.

=== A new building and digitalization ===
The Garden Highway building, which had been constructed by KCCC-TV in stages in the early 1950s, was no longer adequate for KVIE after several decades of use and decay. In 1984, the station conducted studies to identify a site for a new station facility. KVIE had to lease other office space, and during the winter, portable toilets were necessary because the plumbing did not always work. Fundraising efforts began in 1985; at the same time, it was announced that KVIE would move to a new tower being erected by KTXL (channel 40) in Walnut Grove. Ground was broken on the present Natomas studios in 1988, and the station moved in during January 1990. In Hershberger's final years, the station made three controversial rounds of layoffs, totaling 31 positions, in response to a soft economy, but KVIE's finances improved despite the recession.

After three years during which KVIE was led by former CBS News executive Van Gordon Sauter, who launched several new TV programs including California Heartland and Central Valley Chronicles, David Hosley's nine-year tenure as general manager was dominated by the construction of digital transmission facilities and the upgrading of the physical plant. Early in his tenure, in July 1999, KVIE managed the highest prime time rating of any public television station in the United States, surpassing KQED in San Francisco, which had attracted the most viewers for seven consecutive years.

David Lowe became KVIE's general manager in 2008; at the nadir of the Great Recession, membership fell to 40,000 but had increased to 50,000 by 2018. That year, the station and Lowe received a "Pillar of Public Service" award from America's Public Television Stations for testing datacasting of earthquake early warning alerts to businesses and public agencies. Under Lowe, station reserves increased from $2 million to $40 million, which proved essential when Congress rescinded funding for the Corporation for Public Broadcasting in 2025, causing a loss of $2.5 million in revenue or approximately 14 percent of the station's operating budget. In the wake of the rescission, the station added 10,000 new annual donors and saw higher giving levels from its existing supporters. In 2025, KVIE launched the local news website Abridged, a digital-first platform with a website and a morning newsletter.

== Local programming ==
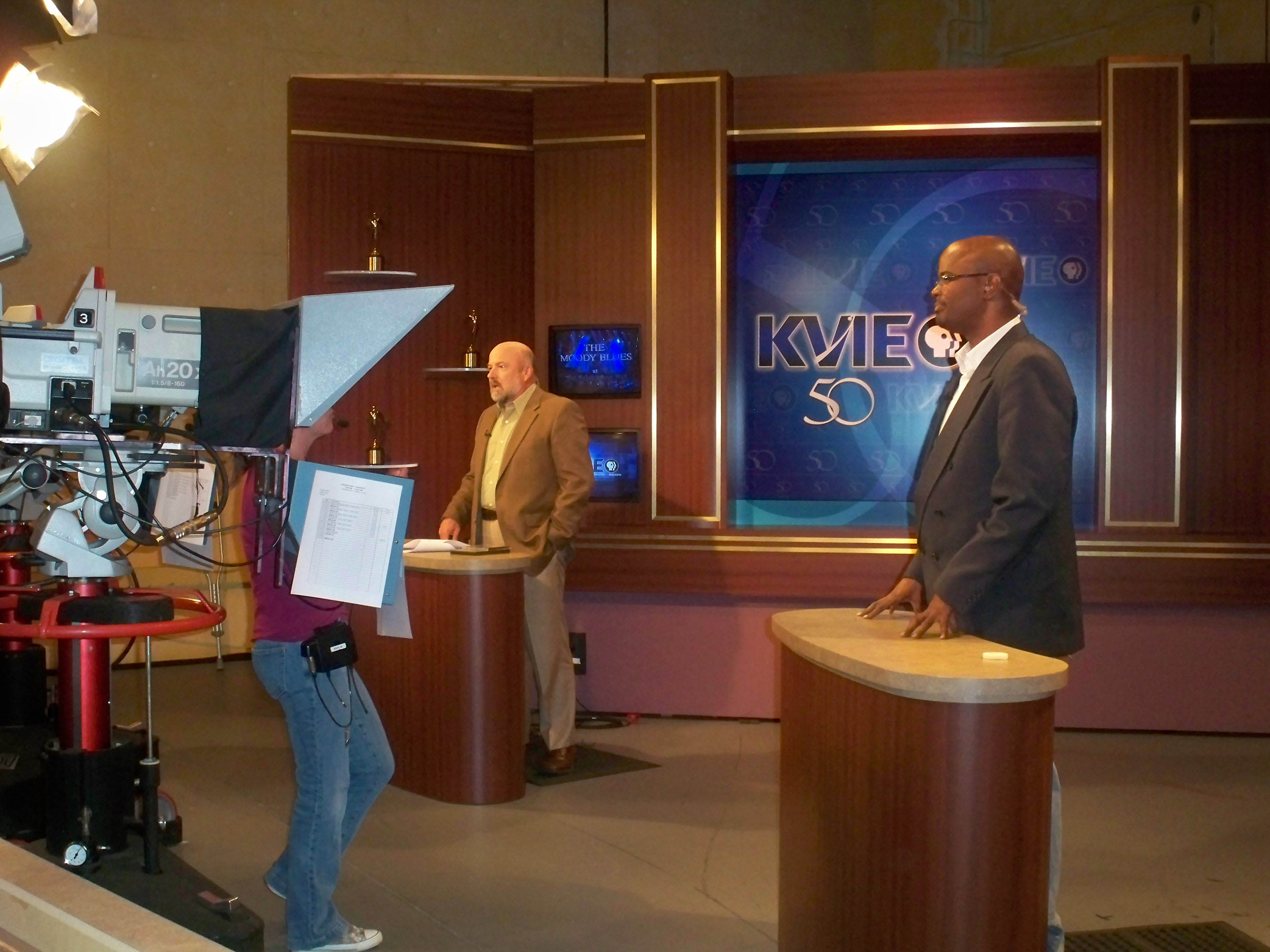
Taping of a pledge drive insert at the KVIE studios in 2009

In addition to PBS programming, KVIE produces in-house programs for distribution locally, regionally and nationwide. Having the widest distribution is America's Heartland, a program covering agriculture issues nationally that debuted in 2005; this replaced the similarly themed California Heartland, which aired for nine seasons.

As the public television station in the state capital, KVIE has also historically produced public affairs programs of statewide interest. Until its cancellation in the early 1980s, the statewide political roundtable California Week in Review originated at the station. From 2002 to 2007, it was one of four co-producers of the statewide newsmagazine California Connected. More recently, Inside California Education, aired statewide, profiles issues facing the state's education system.

KVIE's local programs include Viewfinder, a documentary series; KVIE Arts Showcase, an arts magazine; Rob on the Road, a series of regional travel profiles; and Studio Sacramento, covering public affairs issues in the region. An Abridged news roundup airs adjacent to the PBS News Hour.

== Funding ==
In fiscal year 2021, KVIE raised $16.75 million in revenue, nearly half of the total coming from membership contributions. Funds from the Corporation for Public Broadcasting accounted for 11 percent of revenue.

== Technical information ==
=== Subchannels ===
KVIE's transmitter is located in Walnut Grove, California. The station's signal is multiplexed:

Subchannels of KVIE
Subchannel	Res.	Short name	Programming
6.1	1080i	KVIE-HD	PBS
6.2	1080i	KVIE2	KVIE 2 (PBS Encore)
6.3	480i	KVIE3	Create (2 a.m.–2 p.m.); World (2 p.m.–2 a.m.)
6.4	480i	KVIEKID	PBS Kids

=== Analog-to-digital conversion ===
KVIE ended regular programming on its analog signal, over VHF channel 6, on June 12, 2009, as part of the federally mandated transition from analog to digital television. The station's digital signal relocated from its pre-transition UHF channel 53, which was among the high band UHF channels (52-69) that were removed from broadcasting use as a result of the transition, to VHF channel 9, using virtual channel 6.

As part of the SAFER Act, KVIE kept its analog signal on the air until July 12 to inform viewers of the digital television transition through a loop of public service announcements from the National Association of Broadcasters.
