= Turner Broadcasting System =

American media conglomerate (1965–2019)

Turner Broadcasting System, Inc.
- Final logo, used from 2015 to 2019

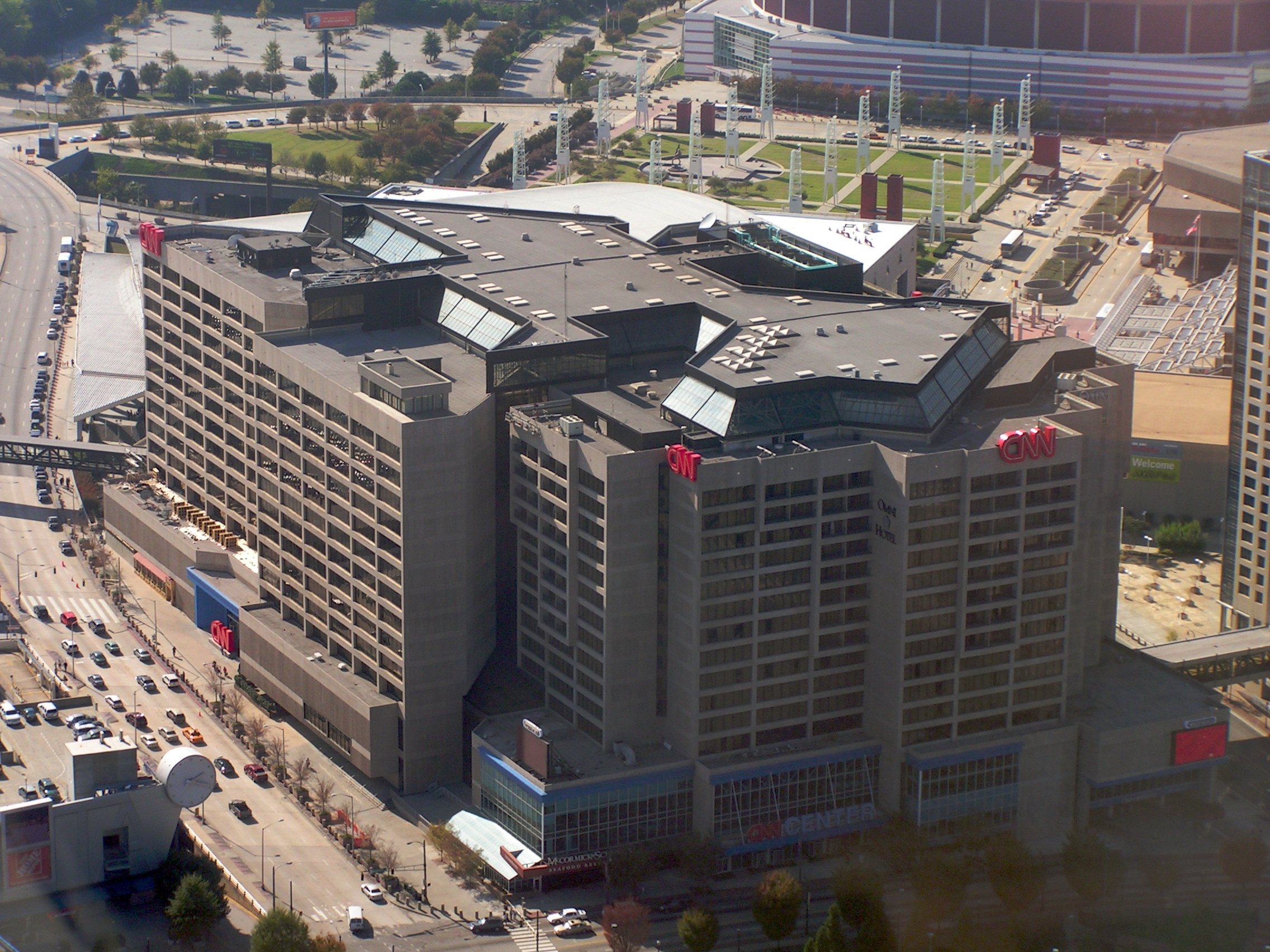
- Headquarters at the CNN Center
- Formerly: Turner Communications Group (1965–1979)
- Type: Subsidiary
- Traded as: AMEX: TBS.A; AMEX: TBS.B
- Industry: Entertainment; Cable television; Mass media; Interactive media
- Predecessor: Turner Advertising Company; Rice Broadcasting Inc.
- Founded: May 12, 1965; 61 years ago
- Founder: Ted Turner
- Fate: Assets dispersed to other WarnerMedia divisions
- Successors: WarnerMedia News & Sports (news and sports assets); WarnerMedia Studios & Networks (film and television studios and assets); WarnerMedia Entertainment (other remaining assets); WarnerMedia International (international assets)
- Headquarters: CNN Center, Atlanta, Georgia, United States
- Brands: Adult Swim; Bleacher Report; B/R Live; Boomerang; Cartoon Network; CNN; Great Big Story; HLN; iStreamPlanet; MLB on TBS; NBA League Pass; TBS; Turner Classic Movies; TNT; TruTV; Turner Sports
- Parent: WarnerMedia (1996–2019)
- Divisions: Turner Entertainment Networks; CNN Worldwide; Kids & Young Adults; Turner Classic Movies; Turner Sports; Turner International
- Website: turner.com (archived April 30, 2019)

Turner Broadcasting System, Inc. was an American media conglomerate founded by Ted Turner on May 12, 1965. Based in Atlanta, Georgia, it merged with Time Warner (later WarnerMedia) on October 10, 1996. As of October 2026, all of its assets are owned by Skydance. The headquarters of Turner's properties were largely located at the CNN Center in Downtown Atlanta, and the Ted Turner Campus off Techwood Drive in Midtown Atlanta, which also houses Techwood Studios. Some of their operations were housed within 30 Hudson Yards in Manhattan's West Side district, and at 230 Park Avenue South in Midtown Manhattan, both in New York City, respectively.

Turner was known for several pioneering innovations in U.S. multichannel television, including its satellite uplink of local Atlanta independent station WTCG channel 17 as TBS – one of the first national "superstations", and its establishment of the Cable News Network (CNN) — the first 24-hour news channel. It later launched a sister cable network, TNT; the professional wrestling promotion World Championship Wrestling (WCW), the animation-centered Cartoon Network (which later spawned an adult-oriented night-time sister network in the form of Adult Swim, as well as the classic-cartoon channel Boomerang), and the classic-movie channel Turner Classic Movies (TCM). Turner South — a network devoted to regional sports and southern lifestyle programming — was launched by Turner in 1999, but was later sold to Fox Sports Networks in 2006 to form SportSouth. The same year, it acquired Liberty Media's stake in their joint venture Court TV. WCW assets were later sold to the World Wrestling Federation (WWF, now WWE) in 2001.

On June 14, 2018, Time Warner, including Turner Broadcasting System, was acquired by telecom firm AT&T and rebranded to WarnerMedia. After the purchase, "Turner" was phased out as a corporate brand, and its properties were dispersed into either WarnerMedia Entertainment (TBS, TNT and TruTV), WarnerMedia News & Sports (CNN, Turner Sports and AT&T SportsNet), or brought directly under Warner Bros. Entertainment (Cartoon Network, Adult Swim and Turner Classic Movies). On August 10, 2020, the WarnerMedia Entertainment and Warner Bros. Entertainment assets were merged to form the WarnerMedia Studios & Networks Group.

As of 2020, AT&T reported the financial results for WarnerMedia's ad-supported cable networks under the Turner business unit, while also using the term "the TNets" to refer to the group of TBS, TNT, and TruTV in press releases. On April 8, 2022, AT&T spun-off WarnerMedia and merged with Discovery, Inc. to form Warner Bros. Discovery, and almost all of both the companies' ad-supported cable networks were brought under the unit Warner Bros. Discovery U.S. Networks. Today, Turner Broadcasting System, Inc. continues to exist as an in-name-only subsidiary of Skydance – formally owning copyrights and holding contracts for former Turner assets.

== History ==
Logo used from 1965 to 2015

=== Early history ===
Turner Broadcasting System traces its roots to a billboard company in Savannah, Georgia, purchased by Robert Edward Turner II in the late 1940s. Turner grew the business, which later became known as Turner Advertising Company. Robert Edward Turner's son, Ted Turner, inherited the company when the elder Turner died in 1963. After taking over the company, Ted Turner expanded the business into radio and television.

Turner Broadcasting System was incorporated in Georgia on May 12, 1965.

=== 1970s ===
In 1970, Ted Turner purchased WJRJ-Atlanta, Channel 17, a small, Ultra High Frequency (UHF) station, and renamed it WTCG, for parent company Turner Communications Group. During December 1976, WTCG originated the superstation concept, transmitting via satellite to cable systems.

HBO had gone to satellite transmissions to distribute its signal nationally in 1975, but that was a service that cable subscribers were made to pay extra to receive. Turner's innovation signaled the start of the basic cable revolution.

On December 17, 1976, WTCG began transmitting via satellite to cable systems in Nebraska, Virginia, Alabama and Kansas. All four cable systems started receiving the 1948 film Deep Waters, which had started 30 minutes earlier. Satellite distribution helped expand WTCG's reach from 675,000 households in the Atlanta area to include an additional 24,000 subscribers across various states. This transition helped to establish WTCG as what would later be known as a superstation, a precursor to modern basic cable television.

In 1979, the company changed its name from Turner Communications Group to Turner Broadcasting System, Inc. (TBS, Inc.) and rebranded WTCG as WTBS.

=== 1980s ===
On June 1, 1980, Cable News Network (CNN) was launched at 5:00 p.m. EDT becoming the first 24-hour news cable channel. The husband and wife team of Dave Walker and Lois Hart news anchored the first newscast. Burt Reinhardt, then executive vice president of CNN, hired most of the channel's first 200 employees and 25-member staff including Bernard Shaw, the network's first news anchor.

In 1981, Turner Broadcasting System acquired Brut Productions from Faberge Inc.

Also in 1981, WTBS began its usage of "Turner Time" in June 1981, in which programming began at five minutes after the top and bottom of each hour, instead of the broadcasting norm of beginning at the top and bottom of the hour.

In 1984, Turner initiated Cable Music Channel, his competition for WASEC's MTV. The channel was short-lived, but helped influence the original format of VH1.

In 1986, after a failed attempt to acquire CBS, Turner purchased the film studio MGM/UA Entertainment Co. from Kirk Kerkorian for $1.5 billion. Following the acquisition, Turner had an enormous debt and sold parts of the acquisition. MGM/UA Entertainment was sold back to Kirk Kerkorian. The MGM/UA Studio lot in Culver City was sold to Lorimar-Telepictures. Turner kept MGM's pre-May 1986 film and television library as well as the Associated Artists Productions library (the pre-1950 Warner Bros. film library and the Fleischer Studios/Famous Studios Popeye cartoons originally released by Paramount Pictures), and the U.S./Canadian distribution rights to the RKO Pictures library. Turner Entertainment Co. was founded on August 4, 1986 to hold the copyrights of and overseeing the acquired library for worldwide distribution.

Turner Program Services ("TPS"), a subsidiary under the Turner umbrella, began domestic syndication of all of the properties acquired under the final disposition of the MGM deal with Kerkorian. TPS inherited over 5,000 program orders (executed, letters of intent) to have domestic syndication agreements prepared and sent in order to "formally" contractually license films for airing on domestic, free-over-the-air television stations throughout the United States. The contractual "back-log" was caught up by the end of 1989, while still administering to all of a domestic television station's syndication needs. In 1987, NBC considered bidding for a piece of the company in an effort to enter the cable business, but the deal was never materialized.

In 1989, TBS Management Company, under the leadership of Charles Shultz, advanced the focus on the two music performing rights subsidiaries: one with Broadcast Music, Inc ("BMI") and ASCAP. In the space of 1989 to 1994, Turner went from two subsidiary music publishing companies to more than sixteen.

On October 3, 1988, the company launched Turner Network Television (TNT).

=== 1990s ===
Turner Broadcasting System expanded its presence in movie production and distribution, first with the 1991 purchase of the Hanna-Barbera and Ruby-Spears animation studios during a competitive bid with MCA/Universal, Hallmark Cards, and several other corporations. On December 22, 1993, Turner Broadcasting System acquired Castle Rock Entertainment. Turner Broadcasting System purchased New Line Cinema a month later.

Turner Broadcasting System launched Cartoon Network on October 1, 1992, followed by Turner Classic Movies (TCM) on April 14, 1994.

In September 1995, Turner Broadcasting System began airing World Championship Wrestling (WCW)'s Monday Nitro on TNT, beginning the Monday Night War against the World Wrestling Federation (WWF)'s Monday Night Raw. Three years later, TBS Superstation began airing WCW Thunder.

On October 10, 1996, Turner Broadcasting System merged with Time Warner, a company formed in 1990 by the merger of Time Inc. and Warner Communications, and which had held 20% of Turner Broadcasting System in the past. Through this merger, Warner Bros. had regained the rights to its pre-1950 library, while Turner Broadcasting System gained access to the company's post-1950 library and other properties.

=== 2000s ===
On April 1, 2000, Turner Broadcasting System launched Boomerang as a sister channel to Cartoon Network featuring the classic cartoons that originally aired on Cartoon Network as the channel was gradually shifting its focus to original cartoons.

Time Warner merged with America Online (AOL) in 2001 to form AOL Time Warner, which was renamed back to the Time Warner name in 2004.

In March 2001, Jamie Kellner would officially succeed Ted Turner as head of Turner Broadcasting System. One of Kellner's most notable actions after succeeding Turner was his decision to cancel WCW's television programs.

In September 2001, Cartoon Network launched Adult Swim as an adult-oriented programming block that would air at midnight when Cartoon Network's target demographic would be asleep. It would go on to be very successful. Since 2005, Adult Swim has been considered its own network according to Nielsen due to Adult Swim and Cartoon Network's differing demographics.

In 2002, Turner started a joint venture with Zee Entertainment Enterprises known as Zee Turner for distribution of their channels in India.

In 2003, Philip I. Kent succeeded Jamie Kellner as chairman. Operational duties for The WB were transferred by Time Warner from Warner Bros. to Turner Broadcasting during 2001, while Kellner was chairman, but were returned to Warner Bros. in 2003 with the departure of Kellner.

On January 1, 2004, Turner launched Pogo in India as a sister channel to Cartoon Network India. The channel is exclusive to South Asia.

On February 23, 2006, Turner agreed to sell the regional entertainment channel Turner South to Fox Entertainment Group. Fox assumed control of the channel on May 1, and on October 13 relaunched it as SportSouth – coincidentally, the former name of Fox Sports South when Turner owned this channel in partnership with Liberty Media between 1990 and 1996.

In May 2006, Time Warner, which had owned 50% of Court TV since 1998, purchased the remaining 50% from Liberty Media and began running the channel as part of Turner Broadcasting. The channel was relaunched as TruTV on January 1, 2008.

Also in May 2006, Ted Turner attended his last meeting as a board member of Time Warner and officially parted with the company.

On October 5, 2007, Turner Broadcasting System completed the acquisition of Claxson Interactive Pay Television Networks in Latin America.

On March 2, 2009, Turner launched Real, the company's first Hindi GEC, in India as a joint venture between it and Alva Brothers Entertainment, which it had partnered with before for content on Cartoon Network India and Pogo TV. The joint venture was known as Real Global Broadcasting. The channel shut down in March 2010, lasting for a year due to low viewership.

On December 8, 2009, it was announced that Turner had bought a majority stake in NDTV Imagine Ltd. from NDTV, for $117 million, as the company's own channel, Real had failed. NDTV Imagine Ltd. was previously a joint venture between NDTV and NBCUniversal. Turner then went on to acquire 92% of NDTV Imagine Ltd. which included NDTV Imagine, NDTV Lumiere, Imagine Showbiz and NDTV Imagine Pictures. Turner dropped the NDTV branding from the channels. Turner sold Imagine Showbiz to Reliance Broadcast Network in 2011.

=== 2010s ===
On August 26, 2010, Turner Broadcasting took full control of Chilevisión, a television channel owned by the President of Chile Sebastián Piñera.

On September 8, 2011, Turner Broadcasting System acquired LazyTown Entertainment, the producer of the TV series LazyTown.

On April 12, 2012, it was announced that Turner would shut down Imagine TV, formerly NDTV Imagine, as the channel struggled for ratings amidst competition from rival Hindi entertainment channels. By 12 May 2012, Imagine TV was shut down in India. Lumiere Movies, formerly NDTV Lumiere, was shut down in July along with TCM India.

On January 1, 2014, John K. Martin succeeded Phil Kent as chairman and CEO of Turner Broadcasting.

In August 2014, The Wrap reported that Turner was preparing to offer buy-outs to 550 employees as part of plans to restructure the company heading into 2015. The ratings performance of CNN and HLN were cited as a factor, while CBSSports.com reported that the rising rights fees Turner pays for its NBA broadcasts on TNT may have also been a factor. It was further reported in October 2014 that the company planned to reduce its workforce by 10% (1,475 people) through layoffs across a wide set of units including corporate positions.

On August 14, 2015, it was announced that Turner Broadcasting had acquired a majority stake in iStreamPlanet, a Las Vegas-based video streaming services company, in an effort to bolster its over-the-top programming and shift its core technology infrastructure to the cloud. iStreamPlanet is a direct competitor of Major League Baseball Advanced Media. The deal was reported to be in the neighborhood of $200 million. In October 2015, Turner launched a streaming-video network named Great Big Story.

In April 2017, in order to expedite the sale of Time Warner to AT&T by shedding FCC-licensed properties, WPCH-TV was sold to Meredith Corporation, which had already been operating WPCH under a local marketing agreement since 2011 as a sister to its local CBS affiliate WGCL-TV. Turner Podcast Network was formed within Turner's content distribution division in June 2017, with Tyler Moody being named general manager and vice president of the unit.

On March 22, 2018, Six Flags and Riverside Group announced a partnership with Turner Asia Pacific to bring attractions based on Tuzki and other Turner-owned IPs to its theme parks in China.

On June 15, 2018, it was announced that John Martin would be leaving as CEO following AT&T's completed acquisition of Time Warner. By September, AT&T had transferred its Audience channel, a group of regional sports networks plus stakes in Game Show Network and MLB Network to Turner from AT&T Communications.

In December 2018, Turner Broadcasting sold the rights to the brand and its pre-2008 original programming library of defunct cable network Court TV (which relaunched as truTV in 2008) to Katz Broadcasting, with plans to re-launch it as an over-the-air digital network in May 2019.

On March 4, 2019, AT&T announced a major reorganization of its broadcasting assets that would effectively break-up Turner Broadcasting System. Its assets are to be dispersed across multiple units of WarnerMedia, including the newly created WarnerMedia Entertainment and WarnerMedia News & Sports. WarnerMedia Entertainment would consist of HBO, TBS, TNT, TruTV, and an upcoming direct-to-consumer video service (led by former NBC entertainment chief Robert Greenblatt), while WarnerMedia News & Sports would consist of CNN, Turner Sports, and the AT&T SportsNet regional networks (which would be led by CNN Worldwide president Jeff Zucker). Cartoon Network, Adult Swim, Boomerang, and Turner Classic Movies would be moved under Warner Bros. Entertainment via what would become the formerly operated "Global Kids & Young Adults" business unit. Although AT&T did not specify any timetable for the changes, WarnerMedia had already begun to remove references to Turner Broadcasting in corporate communications, with press releases referring to its networks as being "divisions of WarnerMedia". However, the Turner logo was still used at its building in Atlanta, Georgia until it was removed in October 2019.

=== 2020s ===
On August 10, 2020, WarnerMedia restructured several of its units in a major corporate revamp that resulted in TBS, TNT and TruTV being brought back under the same umbrella as Cartoon Network/Adult Swim, Boomerang and TCM, under a consolidation of WarnerMedia Entertainment and Warner Bros. Entertainment's respective assets that formed the combined WarnerMedia Studios & Networks Group unit. Casey Bloys—who has been with WarnerMedia since 2004 (as director of development at HBO Independent Productions), and was eventually elevated to President of Programming at HBO and Cinemax in May 2016—added oversight of WarnerMedia's basic cable networks and HBO Max to his purview. Turner was subsequently reincorporated in Delaware on December 30.

On April 8, 2022, WarnerMedia was divested by AT&T and merged with Discovery, Inc. to form Warner Bros. Discovery (WBD). All linear networks owned by the company, besides CNN, Turner Sports, HBO, and Magnolia Network, are overseen by Kathleen Finch as head of Warner Bros. Discovery U.S. Networks, which resulted in Brett Weitz being removed as general manager of TBS, TNT, and TruTV after 14 years with the networks. The News and Sports division was also split up into separate CNN Worldwide and Warner Bros. Discovery Sports divisions, with the latter being renamed TNT Sports in 2023, but also including Discovery's sports properties such as Eurosport.

In 2025, WBD announced it would split into two companies, resulting in Warner Bros. streaming and studios entity assuming TCM, while Discovery Global would acquire the remaining linear television networks including CNN, TNT, and TBS. Later on December 5, Netflix announced that they would be buying the Warner Bros. streaming and studios company for $72 billion after the split closes in the third quarter, valuing WBD at $82.7 billion, while Paramount Skydance and Comcast launched bids of their own.; Netflix's bid would not have included the Turner networks nor any of WBD's other cable channels. Skydance eventually countered with a bid for both the cable and streaming/studios assets, which Netflix declined to match; after negotiations with antitrust law authorities, Skydance closed on its purchase of WBD (and with it the Turner assets) on October 6, 2026.

Turner Broadcasting System's founder, Ted Turner, died at his home in Lamont, Florida, on May 6, 2026, at the age of 87.

== Former properties and assets ==
=== Transferred to Warner Bros. ===
- Castle Rock Entertainment — a film and television production company
- Hanna-Barbera — an animation studio (Folded into Warner Bros. Animation in 2001)
  - Ruby-Spears Enterprises — An animation studio, and former sister company of Hanna-Barbera (Libraries are owned by Warner Bros. Animation)
- New Line Cinema — a film production company (became separate unit of Time Warner upon close of sale; folded into WB in 2008)
- Turner Entertainment Co. — a film holding company
  - Turner Pictures — a defunct in-house production company
  - Turner Pictures Worldwide Distribution — An international distribution sales unit
  - Turner Feature Animation — a defunct animation unit
  - Turner Home Entertainment — a defunct home video distributor (Merged into Warner Home Video)
  - Turner Program Services — a former syndication arm − (Merged into Warner Bros.' Telepictures)
- The WB — A defunct broadcast television network (with Tribune Broadcasting, 2001–2003; merged with UPN to form The CW in 2006)

==== Transferred to Warner Bros. Interactive Entertainment ====
- Adult Swim Games
- Cartoon Network Games

==== Transferred to Warner Bros. Television Group ====
- Cartoon Network Studios
- Hanna-Barbera Studios Europe

==== Transferred to Warner Bros. Discovery Global Linear Networks ====
- The Cartoon Network, Inc.
  - Williams Street

=== Transferred to Warner Bros. Discovery Networks ===
Note: These assets were temporarily part of Turner Entertainment Networks & Warner Bros. under WarnerMedia Studios & Networks within the WarnerMedia era.

An (*) indicates the assets was once part of Warner Bros. Global Kids, Young Adults and Classics.

==== The Cartoon Network, Inc. ====
- Cartoon Network*
- Adult Swim*
- Boomerang*

==== Entertainment Group ====
- TBS
- TNT
- TruTV
- Turner Classic Movies*
  - Now Playing (magazine)

=== Shuttered ===
- Cable Music Channel — A defunct television channel
- CNN+, a joint-venture between Turner (50%) and Sogecable that only aired in Spain, closed down in late 2010.
- CNNfn — a defunct television channel
- CNN/SI — a defunct television channel
- FilmStruck — a defunct film streaming service
- HBO South Asia
- Mondo Mah-jong TV (Japan)
- Studio T — a defunct production company.
- Super Deluxe — a defunct entertainment company
- Tabi Tele (Japan)
- TCM South East Asia
- Toonami Channel (Asia)
- Toonami India
- WB India
- Real (TV channel) (India)
- Imagine TV (India)

=== Divested ===
- Atlanta Hawks, Atlanta Thrashers and Philips Arena — sold in 2004 to Atlanta Spirit Group, Thrashers resold in 2011 to True North Sports and Entertainment and now known as the Winnipeg Jets. Hawks resold in 2015 to Tony Ressler
- Chilevisión — Chilean free-to-air television channel, sold to Paramount Global, and now owned by Vytal Group
- Game Show Network (42%)
- GameTap — sold to Metaboli in 2008, later closed in 2010
- Hulu (10%) — now fully owned and controlled by The Walt Disney Company
- LazyTown Entertainment — sold back to Magnus Scheving in 2024
- MGM Entertainment Co. — sold to United Artists under Kirk Kerkorian's ownership in 1986. However, Turner kept the pre-May 1986 MGM library.
- Showtime Scandinavia through NonStop Television in the Scandinavian countries.
- Silver, independent and international movies, through NonStop Television in the Scandinavian countries.
- SportSouth — A regional sports network (Now owned by Main Street Sports Group as FanDuel Sports Network South)
- Turner South — A regional television channel (Now owned by Main Street Sports Group as FanDuel Sports Network Southeast)
- United Artists — sold back to Kirk Kerkorian in 1986
- Woohoo (Brazil)
- Universal Wrestling Corporation — A professional wrestling promotion formerly known as World Championship Wrestling. Currently a defunct company, select assets are now owned by WWE through WCW, Inc.
- WCNC-TV — A terrestrial broadcasting station in Charlotte (now owned by Tegna Inc.)
- WPCH-TV — A terrestrial broadcasting station in Atlanta and a former superstation (now owned by Gray Media)
