= Bianca Solorzano =

American journalist

- Born: March 21, 1974 (age 51); Boston, Massachusetts, U.S.
- Education: University of Miami (BS)
- Occupation: Journalist
- Spouse: Timothy Stewart Lucas (m. 2008)
- Children: 2
- Parent(s): Oscar Solorzano; Madeline Solorzano

Bianca Solorzano (born March 21, 1974) is an American journalist.

== Early life and education ==
Solorzano was born in Boston on March 21, 1974. She was raised in Miami.

Solorzano obtained her Bachelor of Science degree with a double major in broadcast journalism and theatre arts from the University of Miami, where she graduated cum laude. She was also an anchor for the University of Miami's cable news channel.

== Career ==
Solorzano worked at WIVT in Binghamton, New York, from 1996 to 1998 and WBRE-TV in Wilkes-Barre, Pennsylvania, from 1998 to 1999. From 1999 to 2003, Solorzano was the weekend anchor and three-day weekday reporter at KCRA-TV, an NBC affiliate in Sacramento, California, and departed for an anchor position at MSNBC. Solorzano has been with CBS News since 2005, first as a New York City–based correspondent for CBS Newspath and then for CBS News itself since 2006, appearing on The Early Show amongst others.

== Personal life ==
Solorzano married Timothy Stewart Lucas in 2008 at St. Bartholomew's Church in New York City. Her parents are Madeline Solorzano and Dr. Oscar Solorzano, who is an orthopedic surgeon. She has two children and resides in New York City.

== Awards ==
In 1998, Solorzano was the recipient of a New York Associated Press Broadcasters Association Award for Best Interview of the Year for the interview she had with Waneta Hoyt.
