= Brad Willis =

Brad Willis may refer to:

- Brad Willis (Neighbours), a character on the Australian soap opera Neighbours
- Brad Willis (journalist) (born 1949), former NBC News foreign correspondent
