= Lloyd E. Levine =

American politician (born 1969)

Member of the California State Assembly from the 40th district
- In office December 2, 2002 - November 30, 2008
- Preceded by: Robert Hertzberg
- Succeeded by: Bob Blumenfield

Personal details
- Born: July 3, 1969 (age 57) Los Angeles County, California
- Party: Democratic
- Spouse: Edie Lambert (m. 2009)
- Education: University of California, Riverside

Lloyd Edward Levine (born July 3, 1969) is a Democratic politician who represented California's 40th State Assembly district from December 2, 2002, to November 30, 2008. In the Assembly, Levine served as the Majority Whip and then as chair of the Committee on Utilities and Commerce where he shepherded legislation on renewable energy, energy efficiency, solar, and digital infrastructure. Levine was known for his effort to enact a spay and neutering law for some pets, his effort to ban incandescent light bulbs, his program to promote fitness, and his plastic bag recycling program.

Levine was termed out of the Assembly at the end of 2008 and lost to Fran Pavley in a primary election that year for a state Senate seat. Prior to being elected to the assembly, Levine served as Legislative Director to former Assemblymember John Longville.

After leaving the Assembly, Levine founded and has headed Filament Strategies. He was named to the founding advisory board of the University of California Riverside School of Public Policy in 2014 and in 2018 was named a Senior Policy Fellow at that school. Levine has consulted on issues relating to the environment and technology, including closing the digital divide in California and increased electric vehicle adoption.

== Personal life ==
Levine earned a Bachelor of Arts degree from the University of California, Riverside, and he received an "Outstanding Alumnus Award" from UCR in 2005. He has also completed his course work toward a Master of Arts degree in Public Policy and Administration at California State University, Sacramento. He currently resides in Sacramento. Levine married Edie Lambert, KCRA-TV station anchor (Sacramento) on September 21, 2008, in Seattle, WA. They have two daughters.

== See also ==
- California Assembly Bill 1634 (2007)

== Succession boxes ==
Political offices
Preceded by Fabian Nunez	State Assembly Majority Whip; February 9, 2004 - December 6, 2004	Succeeded by Karen Bass
Preceded by Robert Hertzberg	California State Assemblymember, 40th District; 2002-2008	Succeeded by Bob Blumenfield
