= Stan Atkinson =

American news reporter and anchor (1932–2025)

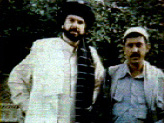
- Atkinson (left) undercover in Afghanistan with the Mujahadin

News Anchor for KCRA
- In office 1959–1963

News Anchor for KCRA
- In office 1976–1994

News Anchor for KOVR
- In office 1994–1999

Personal details
- Born: November 11, 1932
- Died: May 25, 2025 (aged 92)
- Education: Pasadena City College
- Awards: Three Emmys for each of his two assignments inside Afghanistan, and another for a documentary he produced while covering Somalia in 1981

Stan Atkinson (November 11, 1932 – May 25, 2025) was an American television news reporter and anchor.

== Career ==
Stan Atkinson studied journalism at Pasadena City College before serving in the U.S. Army as a Fort Ord Division faculty member. He was a documentary producer, writer, and director for David Wolper Productions, a reporter and anchorman in the San Francisco Bay Area, and NBC Los Angeles, where he covered the Tate-LaBianca murders and the trial of Charles Manson.

He selected all of his assignments himself, many of them dangerous, such as being chased by a Soviet helicopter gunship in Afghanistan, held up and robbed by guerrillas in El Salvador, and shot at in Cambodia. He also covered the presence of U.S. forces in Bosnia, reported on Hong Kong's reunification with China, went to Baghdad and Kuwait before and after Operation Desert Storm, covered the withdrawal of American forces from Somalia, and on his third assignment to South Africa, he covered the transition of South Africa as their citizens voted in the country's first all-race, democratic election.

Atkinson also has a long history with Vietnam. He was there in 1961 and 1962 when it was still "The Dirty Little War" in the south, and in 1987, he took former Green Beret Captain (the late B.T. Collins) back to Vietnam.

Atkinson retired in July 1999 after 46 years in television and radio. He was the principal news anchor and reporter for KCRA 3 Sacramento for 23 years. Then, he spent 5 years at KOVR 13 anchoring and reporting on the weekday newscasts.

== Recognition ==
Atkinson was honored by the State Legislature, the Sacramento County Board of Supervisors, the Sacramento City Council, and the Congressional Record. He received the Sacramento Metropolitan Chamber of Commerce's "Sacramentan of the Year," a Lifetime Achievement Award from the Sacramento Regional Foundation, the World Affairs Council Award for International Reporting, and the Albert and Mary Lasker Award for Medical Journalism.

He was one of 25 reporters selected for the Ford Foundation Journalism Fellowship at Stanford University in 1967. He won three Emmys for his two assignments inside Afghanistan and another for a documentary he produced while covering Somalia in 1981. Atkinson also received Distinguished Service Medals from both the Afghan and Angolan Freedom Fighters.

In 2016, the Northern California chapter of the National TV Academy presented him with the Governor's Award. The award is given to an individual for outstanding achievement in television that is either cumulative or so extraordinary and universal as to be beyond the realm of the regular achievement awards presented by the Academy.

Atkinson was the 1989 George Washington Medal for Individual Achievement winner from the Freedom Foundation in Valley Forge, Pennsylvania. He also received the World Affairs Council Award for International Reporting and the 1961 Albert and Mary Lasker Award for Medical Journalism.

== Charity work ==
Atkinson's community service work in Sacramento began in 1960, when he joined the boards of the Mental Health Association and the Family Service Agency. He also served on the boards or advisory councils of 11 other charitable organizations.

== Personal life and death ==
Atkinson resided in Sacramento and contributed to the community until his death on May 25, 2025, at the age of 92.

He was the father of four sons and a daughter, and a stepfather of four.
