= IStreamPlanet =

VIdeo streaming company in United States

iStreamPlanet
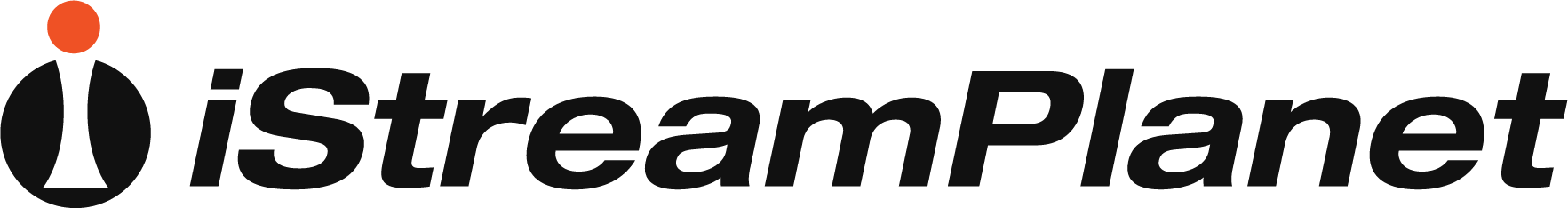
- iStreamPlanet's Final Logo
- Type: Subsidiary
- Industry: Streaming Media; Video on Demand
- Founded: 2000
- Founder: Mio Babic
- Defunct: August 14, 2023; 3 years ago
- Fate: Majority stake acquired by Turner Broadcasting in 2015, and company shut down in 2023
- Headquarters: Las Vegas, Nevada, United States
- Area served: United States
- Products: Aventus Media Processing Suite; Orbis Direct-To-Consumer Platform
- Services: Video Transcoding; DRM; Content Management; Billing
- Number of employees: 150 (2019)
- Parent: Warner Bros. Discovery
- Website: istreamplanet.com

iStreamPlanet was a Las Vegas, Nevada-based company that processed and delivered live video broadcasts over the internet. A majority stake of iStreamPlanet was acquired by Turner Broadcasting in 2015 and was lastly operated by Warner Bros. Discovery. The company was founded in 2000 by former basketball player Mio Babic.

iStreamPlanet streamed a number of major sporting events, including NCAA Division I men's basketball tournaments, the Olympics, the Super Bowl, the FIFA World Cup, and Formula One auto racing..

iStreamPlanet was formally shutdown in 2023 with 25 employees laid off. Months before this, external companies had been told that iStreamPlanet was changing models to no longer have external customers outside of Warner Bros. Discovery. Portions of iStreamPlanet's technology platform, as well as its engineering and operations teams, were incorporated into the Warner Bros. Discovery engineering organization focused on HBO Max.

== Customers ==
While not all of iStreamPlanet's live video streaming customers were publicly known, some of their large customers were publicly acknowledged, including:

- WarnerMedia (including streaming of March Madness and B/R Live)
- NBC Sports (including streaming of the 2010, 2012, 2014, 2016, 2018, 2020, and 2022 Olympics)
- Hulu
- FuboTV
- Spark Sport
