= Edie Lambert =

American journalist

- Born: Friday Harbor, Washington, U.S.
- Spouse(s): Lloyd E. Levine (m. 2008)
- Children: 2

Edie Lambert (born November 26, 1968) is a well-known TV journalist in the Sacramento region. She anchors the 5:00 pm, 6:00 pm, and 11:00 pm newscasts on KCRA.

== Career ==
Lambert joined KCRA in July 1995 as a reporter and morning anchor. Later she became the weekend anchor with Ron Jones (now at KOVR), until 2002. Then she anchored with Kevin Riggs on the weekend evening editions of the newscast. In early 2006, she switched positions to anchor the 6:00pm and 11:00pm newscast with John Alston. She is now teamed up with Gulstan Dart.

Lambert graduated from the University of California at Santa Barbara with a Bachelor of Arts degree in Political Science. She credits her father with giving her the advice to follow her passions, which would later lead to finding her path. She is involved with many non-profit organizations, including a domestic violence shelter and a breast cancer research and education organization. She serves on the Board of Directors of the Sacramento Press Club. Prior to joining KCRA she worked at KEYT-TV as an evening anchor and reporter. Lambert says her motivation to fight cancer comes from her aunt, who was diagnosed and treated for breast cancer in the late 1970s, and her father, who was treated for a sarcoma in his leg using chemotherapy that had initially been developed to fight breast cancer. Lambert's sister and brother-in-law both work at the Fred Hutchinson Cancer Research Center.

Lambert has won a number of awards, including an Emmy for a documentary on breast cancer. She has consistently been selected as Sacramento Magazine's reader's choice for best local reporter and then best anchor.

== Personal life ==
Both of Lambert's parents are marine biologists; her mother has discovered and named six new species of tunicates and has authored or co-authored 66 papers; her father, Charles, was a noted embryologist and professor emeritus at California State University, Fullerton. Although she was well-traveled when younger, following her parents on numerous scientific expeditions, Lambert credits Friday Harbor, Washington as her hometown.

Lambert currently resides in Sacramento with her husband, Lloyd E. Levine whom she married on September 21, 2008, and they have two children. Lambert and Levine, then the Assemblymember from California's 40th Assembly District, met on a flight from Seattle to Sacramento in November 2005. Her first daughter was born in 2010. Lambert's second daughter was born two weeks before the birth of the daughter of Kellie DeMarco, her co-anchor, in 2014.
