= Miguel Almaguer =

American journalist (born 1977)

- Born: March 11, 1977 (age 49); Oakland, California, U.S.
- Education: San Francisco State University, broadcast communications
- Occupation: Media Specialist
- Employer: Marin County Sheriff's Department

Miguel Almaguer (born March 11, 1977) is an American former journalist. He was a correspondent for NBC News, reporting for all divisions of the network and based at its Los Angeles bureau until leaving NBC News on December 31, 2023. He now works as a Media Specialist for the Marin County Sheriff's Department.

== Early life and education ==
Almaguer was born in Oakland, California, and raised in Berkeley, California. He attended Berkeley High School. He was a student at the University of California, Santa Cruz, but left after his sophomore year and subsequently attended a community college in his hometown. While there, his aunt, a news anchor in the San Francisco Bay Area, recommended that he look into taking a class being taught by her co-anchor at San Francisco State University (SFSU). Almaguer enrolled at the school and years later said he "fell in love with the broadcasting department, my classes, and my local news internship... I still remember being a college intern... sitting in a local newsroom and watching the buzz and energy in the room." He graduated with high honors from SFSU with a degree in broadcast communications.

== Career ==
Almaguer began his television career with KSBW in Salinas, California, in 2000. In 2003, he became a reporter for KCRA-TV in Sacramento, California. He then joined WRC-TV in Washington, D.C., in 2006 as a general assignment reporter covering breaking news. On April 2, 2009, Almaguer was hired as a Burbank, California-based correspondent with NBC News to report for all of the network's divisions, including NBC Nightly News, Today, and MSNBC.

In 2004, Almaguer won an Edward R. Murrow Award for Spot News. He earned an Emmy Award for his reporting on the 2007 San Diego wildfires. He also received awards from the National Association of Hispanic Journalists.

During the November 4, 2022, broadcast for Today, Almaguer reported on the assault on Paul Pelosi, stating from an anonymous source that Pelosi had told San Francisco police there was no indication he was in danger when he answered the door. The report was seen as inaccurate as the police stated Pelosi was struggling with the intruder, David DePape when they had arrived at his home. However, the NBC affiliate KNTV in San Francisco reported from one source that Pelosi had opened the door after watching police body camera footage. Hours later, NBC News removed the video report from the Today website, stating it "did not meet NBC News reporting standards". On November 14, The Daily Beast reported that Almaguer had been placed on suspension from NBC News. During the December 12 broadcast for NBC Nightly News, Almaguer returned from a four-week absence to report on the mid-December blizzard affecting parts of the United States.

== Personal life ==
Almaguer lives in Studio City, Los Angeles.
