= Jon Duncanson =

American broadcaster (born 1956)

Jon Duncanson (born March 11, 1956) is a former American broadcaster who worked for many years as a television news anchor and reporter in Chicago.

== Early life and education ==
A native of Minnesota, Duncanson majored in journalism at the University of Minnesota, but left before earning his degree.

== Professional career ==
Duncanson began his career working for Greenpeace International. He was featured in Rolling Stone magazine in November, 1981, for his efforts as a lead organizer of the largest anti-nuclear protest in U.S. history to stop the opening of the Diablo Canyon nuclear power plant in California. The report featured Duncanson's approach to maximizing media attention to environmental activism as well as his arrest on conspiracy charges for his role in the protest. The charges were later dropped.

In 1983 he began his journalistic career as a freelance photographer in Honduras, Nicaragua and El Salvador, working for UPI with occasional assignments from Time Magazine. He then worked as a television reporter and presenter for WDIO-TV in Duluth from 1984 until 1985, WFTV-TV in Orlando from 1985 until 1988, and KCRA-TV in Sacramento from 1988 until 1992. He also traveled through Croatia in November 1992 and taped the fighting in that country on his home video camera, winning an Emmy Award in the San Francisco/Northern California region.

In total he covered wars as a freelance reporter in Nicaragua, El Salvador and Honduras and later in Colombia for KCRA-TV(NBC) as well as Croatia, Bosnia and Serbia for KCRA and for WBBM-TV and WFLD-TV in Chicago. On 24 February 1992 he joined WBBM-TV in Chicago as a general assignment reporter. He won two more Emmys in the Chicago/Midwest region for reports from Bosnia. In 1994 his efforts were documented in the French film The Troubles We've Seen - A History of Journalism in Wartime, by Academy Award-winning director Marcel Ophüls. The film received the International Critics' Award at the Montreal World Film Festival.

In September 1995 Duncanson left WBBM-TV after choosing not to accept a contract renewal. In late October 1995 he was hired by WFLD-TV in Chicago as a 6 am news anchor, which also included providing special reports for the station's 9 pm newscast. The following year he became news presenter for WFLD's 7 am to 9 am newscast also.

In 1996 Duncanson made a cameo appearance in the movie Primal Fear as a location reporter.

In August 1997 Duncanson and his wife, TV presenter/reporter Sylvia Gomez, left WFLD to travel the world together. They traveled to Yugoslavia, England, France, Italy, India, Thailand, China, Panama, Peru and Mexico, logging more than 30,000 miles over a five-year period. Nine months were spent sailing from San Francisco, into the Sea of Cortez off Baja Mexico, ending up in Puerto Vallarta, where they purchased a seaside villa. After their first child was born in 2002 the couple received an offer from NBC News and settled down in Los Angeles and began working again as national correspondents.

In 2003 Duncanson and Gomez returned to Chicago's airwaves, rejoining WBBM-TV on 30 June 2003 as husband-and-wife weekend news presenters and general assignment reporters. Duncanson won his fourth Emmy covering the tsunami in 2005 reporting from Banda Aceh, Indonesia. In January 2006 Duncanson and Gomez were moved from their weekend news anchoring duties to full-time general assignment reporting duties. Duncanson was a returning guest lecturer on Journalism and Media Issues at Columbia College in Chicago, as well as at Northwestern University's Medill School of Journalism. He served as Master of Ceremonies for the University of Chicago Hospitals Cancer Survivors Day event for three consecutive years. The events were headed by Michelle Obama, at the time VP of Marketing for U of C Hospitals. The couple left WBBM-TV at the end of 2006 and moved to their home in Mexico.

In 2007 Duncanson was named the public relations chief of a Mexican importer/exporter and national distributor of microbrewed craft beer.

Since January 2007 Duncanson and Gomez have been running Aviana Productions, a video/strategic media company in the San Francisco Bay Area and Mexico. In March 2009 Duncanson was invited to the West Wing of the White House and discussed how the Obama Administration could use viral video and social media to promote its political image and agenda. In 2010 the couple produced a campaign film and served as advisors for Mario Lopez Valdez, the sitting federal senator from Sinaloa, Mexico, in his campaign for governor there. In a surprise upset, Lopez Valdez won the election. In July 2010 Duncanson and Gomez, through Aviana Productions, won a North American Aegis Award for a marketing film produced with golfing legend Jack Nicklaus. At year's end the couple won two more Aegis Awards for films produced for the luxury Mexican resorts Palmasola, and Imanta Resorts, both located near Puerto Vallarta. Aviana's clients have included Accel Partners, Atlassian, Intel Corp., Deloitte, Greg Norman, Punta Mita, and Stanford University, among others. Duncanson and Gomez broadened their company to include coaching C-Suite executives for public presentations, TEDTalks and IPO tours. Since its inception, Aviana Productions has garnered 40 communications awards. Duncanson has continued lecturing on media issues at various locales including the Mita Tech Talks in Punta Mita, Mexico as well as at Stanford University Law School. He was featured with his wife, Sylvia, on the Sirius XM satellite radio show, Launch Pad in 2018, sponsored by the Wharton School of Business.

== Personal ==
In 1992, Duncanson began dating Chicago TV reporter Sylvia Gomez. The couple was engaged early in 1995, and married on October 13, 1995, in a ceremony presided over by Cook County Clerk and former Chicago Mayor David Orr. Their first child, Ian Gomez Duncanson, was born in June 2002.

The couple have homes in California and in Puerto Vallarta, Mexico.
