= KCRA-TV =

Television station in Sacramento, California

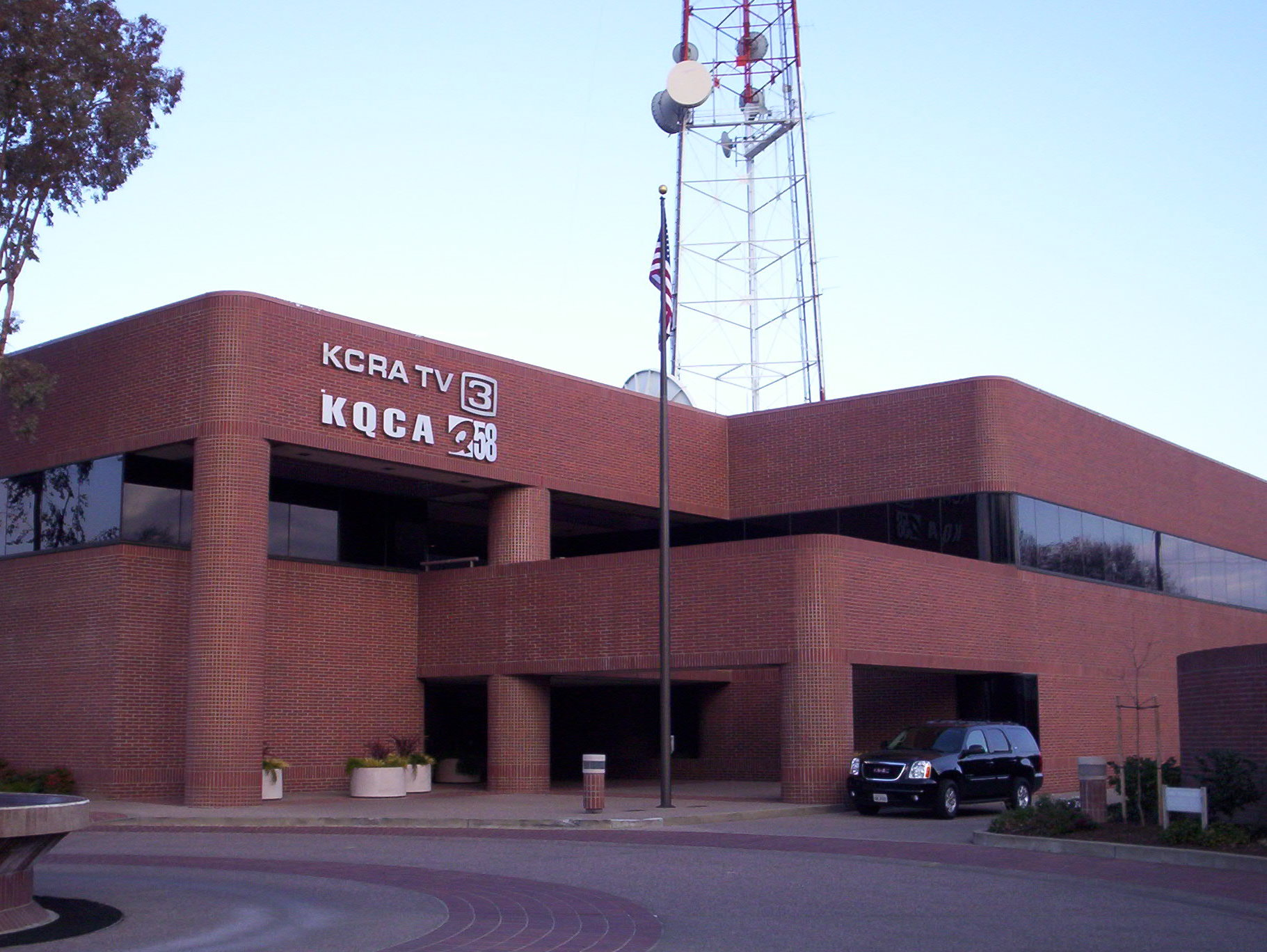
- KCRA/KQCA studios in Sacramento
- Sacramento, California; United States
- Channels: Digital: 35 (UHF); Virtual: 3
- Branding: KCRA 3

Programming
- Affiliations: 3.1: NBC; for others, see § Subchannels

Ownership
- Owner: Hearst Television; (Hearst Stations Inc.)
- Sister stations: KQCA

History
- First air date: September 3, 1955
- Former channel number: Analog: 3 (VHF, 1955–2009)
- Call sign meaning: Taken from KCRA radio, now KIFM (Note: Though 'cra' appears consecutively in "Sacramento", when the Kellys started KCRA radio in 1945, they filed for KRCA to try to extract favorable affiliation terms from NBC's owner, RCA, though a clerical error at the FCC resulted in the call sign KCRA being issued instead.)

Technical information
- Licensing authority: FCC
- Facility ID: 33875
- ERP: 1,000 kW
- HAAT: 579 m (1,900 ft)
- Transmitter coordinates: 38°15′54″N 121°29′28″W

Links
- Public license information: Public file; LMS
- Website: www.kcra.com

KCRA-TV (channel 3) is a television station in Sacramento, California, United States, affiliated with NBC. It is owned by Hearst Television alongside Stockton-licensed CW affiliate KQCA (channel 58). The two stations share studios on Television Circle off D Street in downtown Sacramento; KCRA-TV's transmitter is located in Walnut Grove, California.

KCRA-TV began broadcasting on September 3, 1955. An NBC affiliate from the first day on air, it was built by the Kelly and Hansen families, owners of KCRA radio, with the Kellys assuming sole control in 1962 and forming Kelly Broadcasting. The Kelly era was characterized by a very high level of investment into the news product in the areas of technology and personnel. The result of channeling this attention into the news department was an image as the leading news station and a dominant position in news ratings that has generally persisted throughout the station's history, making it one of NBC's leading affiliates. KCRA was first locally to use electronic news gathering and the first TV station in California to own its own news helicopter. Nationally, its Weeknight was the first local evening magazine program, predating other attempts such as Evening Magazine and PM Magazine, and it was the first station to institute local weekend morning newscasts. KCRA employees of this period included Joan Lunden, who spent 17 years as host of Good Morning America, and Maurice DuBois, who in 2025 was co-anchor of the CBS Evening News.

In the 1980s and early 1990s, KCRA also experimented with producing programming for national syndication; the most successful effort, the newsmagazine The West/In America, ran for three years. From 1991 to 1993, KCRA experimented with an early prime time schedule from 7 to 10 p.m., airing a 10 p.m. local newscast; when NBC forced the station to switch back to regular prime time, KCRA began producing the newscast for channel 58, which it then began programming.

Citing continued consolidation in the television industry, Kelly concluded it could not become large enough to compete with other station groups for the rights to syndicated programs. It exited the business in 1999 and sold KCRA-TV to Hearst-Argyle Television. Under Hearst, KCRA has remained the news ratings leader in the Sacramento television market while expanding its news output to 67 hours a week across KCRA and KQCA.

== Kelly Broadcasting ownership ==
=== Early years ===
On November 22, 1950, KCRA, Inc.—the owner of the KCRA radio stations at 1320 AM and 94.1 FM—filed an application with the Federal Communications Commission (FCC) for a new television station in Sacramento, seeking to broadcast on channel 6. At the time, the FCC had a freeze on new TV station grants. Channel 6 was reserved for non-commercial educational use when the FCC lifted the freeze in 1952, requiring the application to be amended to specify another channel. Of Sacramento's four radio stations at the time, three of them sought channel 3 after the freeze: KCRA, KROY and its owner Harmco Inc., and KXOA and its owner Sacramento Broadcasters. The latter company set up the first television studio in town to train its technicians. Harmco dropped out after selling KROY, leaving KCRA and KXOA in contention for the channel 3 permit, with hearings taking place in early 1953.

FCC examiner Thomas H. Donahue handed down his initial decision on June 7, 1954. He narrowly favored KCRA for channel 3 and found that, though both applicants had strong bids, "KCRA's showing of close and unbroken identity with the Sacramento community, plus its record of improvement of technical facilities, betokens an insurance of a stable, continuous and progressive service which Sacramento Broadcasters does not match and that this consideration outweighs Sacramento Broadcasters showing of superior management skill". The decision attracted an appeal from KXOA, which felt that Donahue's decision was too emotional, and the FCC's broadcast bureau, who found that Donahue considered criteria that were "unimportant or invalid". The matter came to the FCC's commissioners, who upheld the initial decision in a ruling favoring KCRA based on a slightly better past record of broadcasting.

To house KCRA radio and the new television station, KCRA president Ewing Kelly announced a new building at 10th and C streets in downtown Sacramento. The station obtained network affiliation with NBC. KCRA-TV began broadcasting on September 3, 1955, with a live program from the California State Fair. After a short period of reduced-power broadcasts, the station began full-power broadcasting on September 22 from the 573-foot (175 m) tower at the studios. In addition to network programs, KCRA-TV broadcast news; a local women's show, The Valley Playhouse; and Captain Sacto, a children's program hosted by Fred Wade. These programs originated from a studio that had previously been a warehouse for milk trucks. KCRA-TV was, per a 1987 feature in The Sacramento Bee, a "near-instant success". Bob Miller, the station's first art director, recalled talking to Ewing Kelly near the station's neon sign, which rendered the K, R, and A in red—but the C in green. Kelly admitted, "The green C stands for cash!" (Note: This sign was still on the building in 2020. It was restored and moved to a different position as a freestanding monument in 2023.) In 1962, KCRA joined with its two principal competitors—KXTV (channel 10) and KOVR (channel 13)—to erect a 1,549-foot (472 m) tower in Walnut Grove, designed to extend the stations' signals to distant areas.

In the beginning, KCRA, Inc. was owned by the Kelly and Hansen families, with backgrounds in advertising and the dairy industry, respectively. Ewing Kelly died in 1960, and his widow Nina and sons Robert and Jon formed the Kelly Broadcasting Company. Jon Kelly became KCRA-TV's general manager upon his father's death, and the Kelly family bought out the Hansens in 1962. Non-news local programming included the Seven Arts Theatre series of horror movies, hosted from 1966 to 1970 by Bob Wilkins, who later went on to host similar shows at Sacramento's KTXL and Oakland's KTVU.

The Kellys exited Sacramento radio in 1978 by selling KCRA and KCTC (the former KCRA-FM) to WGN Continental Broadcasting Company. The KCRA studio complex was expanded by 48,000 square feet (4,500 m^{2}) in the mid-1980s, with the addition of three new studios; when the $10 million expansion was completed, the station adopted a new address on Television Circle.

=== "Where the News Comes First" ===
All the way along we wanted to be in competition with The Sacramento Bee. We wanted to do our thing as well as the McClatchy people did their newspaper, to provide another voice in the community—not in opposition to The Bee, but an alternative. In order to compete, we felt we had to have a quality product that was somehow comparable.

— Jon Kelly

From the start, KCRA-TV emphasized news as its primary form of local programming. In 1956, the station debuted its regular newscasts under the title Channel 3 Reports, and in 1957 or 1958 it began using the slogan "Where the News Comes First". To expand the station's newscasts, Robert and Jon Kelly decided to scrap existing children's programming, even though the station earned money from the shows; in a 1971 interview with Broadcasting, Jon Kelly noted, "Our dad called us both in and wanted to know if we were crazy." The decision paid off because the commercials in newscasts produced better recall for advertisers. As KCRA's newscasts became the most-watched in Sacramento, the station was able to charge more money for commercials and reinvest into the news operation.

Jon Kelly was noted as a free-spender willing to spend as necessary to produce a top-quality news product. In 1971, he called KCRA-TV "probably one of the few stations and maybe the only station in the country without a budget", noting that they "conscientiously" overspent in sales and news efforts. The station frequently acquired new and up-to-date equipment. It was first locally to use electronic news gathering equipment, first in California to own its own news helicopter (LiveCopter 3, debuted in 1979), and first locally to have a tower camera (1987). It was early in conducting international travel as part of its local news operation; at one point in 1970, Robert Kelly spent five months in Europe studying the output of the BBC. It also was early in expanding the volume of early evening news it produced. Robert Kelly believed KCRA was second in the United States to have an hour-long early evening newscast, and in 1971 it expanded to two hours of local evening news. When NBC initiated prime time news updates, which were three hours old by the time they aired on the West Coast, KCRA was the first station in the network to replace them with local updates.

The result of this philosophy and the nimbleness afforded by local, private ownership was a reputation as the news station in the Sacramento market and a wide lead in the ratings. In 1981, George Williams of The Sacramento Bee noted, "Channel 3 is so dominant in this highly competitive field of local news that there appears to be no contest, like a mile runner who not only laps his opponents but begins to literally run circles around them." KCRA's local news ratings dominance and strong promotion helped it weather the lean years of NBC in the late 1970s and early 1980s. Even as NBC Nightly News ranked third nationally, it was the most-watched national evening newscast in Sacramento, and even as the network ran third, Variety declared KCRA "possibly the leading NBC-TV affiliate in the country". Few stations—WPVI-TV in Philadelphia and KBTV in Denver, both ABC affiliates, among them—drew comparable ratings figures for their newscasts. In 1983, it rebuffed overtures from ABC to induce an affiliation switch; Jon Kelly admitted that had Fred Silverman still been running NBC, he likely would have accepted the rival network's offer. The next year, KCRA completed construction on a new, maximum-height 2,000-foot (610 m) tower at Walnut Grove.

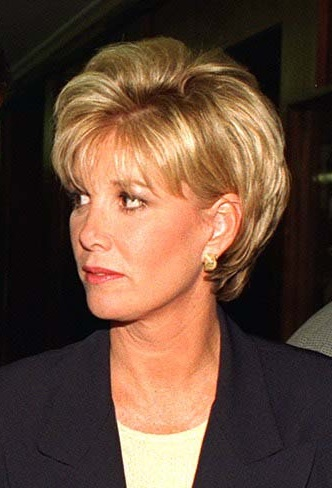
Joan Lunden started her television career at KCRA-TV before going on to host Good Morning America.

KCRA has produced news talent that went on to fame in larger markets. KCRA salesman Bill De Blonk introduced a young Joan Blunden, a model who had appeared in several commercials, to the news department. By 1975, she had offers to work in major markets across the United States. When she sent a tape to WABC-TV in New York City, she was nearly immediately hired. She changed her name to Joan Lunden, launching a career that included a 17-year tenure as host of ABC's Good Morning America. Six years later, another KCRA anchor departed for WABC-TV: Kaity Tong. Some news talent made their biggest impact at KCRA. After six years at channel 3 from 1957 to 1963, Stan Atkinson returned to the station in 1976. Kelly hired him against the advice of consultant Frank Magid and Associates, which found he had a "loser" image from his time doing news in San Francisco. Atkinson became the most popular news anchor in the market, anchoring at the station until his 1994 departure for KOVR.

KCRA aggressively expanded its news operation in 1989 and 1990, more than doubling its weekly news output from 29 hours to more than 60 hours with the introduction of overnight news, an extension of the morning newscast to two hours, and new weekend morning newscasts. The station preempted NBC's Saturday morning cartoon lineup, which aired on KSCH-TV (channel 58). Unlike other stations that produced overnight newscasts during this time, KCRA did not fill time by reairing CNN Headline News or All News Channel, instead presenting its overnight news in-house. The weekend morning switch from cartoons to news increased the station's ratings, and by 1991, other major-market network affiliates including in Seattle, Pittsburgh, and Orlando were following KCRA's lead. In 1991, KCRA helped resolve a hostage standoff inside an electronics store when it agreed to a request by the gunmen to air their demands, in an attempt to distract the gunmen.

In 1990, KCRA hired the husband-and-wife team of Dave Walker and Lois Hart to report on weekdays and anchor on weekends. For both, it was a return to Sacramento after stints at CNN and CNBC. When Atkinson left for KOVR, Walker and Hart were promoted to weeknights.

=== Syndicated from Sacramento ===
In the 1980s and early 1990s, Kelly Broadcasting experimented with the national distribution of first-run syndicated programming from KCRA-TV. In 1980, the Kelly brothers, Frank Magid, and television producer Bob Long created Kelly Brothers Productions, which intended to distribute a national magazine program, Weeknight, for air during prime access beginning in September 1981. The program would have competed with the similar PM Magazine, but it was KCRA that had pioneered the concept as a local station; a version of the program had aired since 1972, first as a weekly and then a five-night-a-week program, before Group W adapted the format first for its stations (as Evening Magazine) and then for syndication. The partnership fell apart, but Kelly tried again, allying with Multimedia Program Productions and Magid the next year to produce the similarly formatted American Pie; it failed to sell in enough markets and never launched.

Kelly Broadcasting set up a new syndication division, Kelly Entertainment, in 1986. In January 1987, KCRA-TV began airing TV Lite, an afternoon talk show specializing in entertainment news that Kelly hoped to syndicate the next year. Variety described it as "an informational show dotted with SNL Weekend Update–type comedy bits". The show had a staff of 36 and originated from the newly expanded KCRA studios. The program was considered a flop; Jon Kelly admitted, "It had some neat ingredients. But I couldn't get the quality fast enough." It went on to inspire The Wilton North Report, a short-lived late night show aired by Fox.

In April 1989, KCRA-TV began airing a regionally oriented newsmagazine, The West. The half-hour program, hosted by Vicki Liviakis, John Gibson, and Joe Oliver, was pitched as a West Coast–centric alternative to the eastern bias in network newsmagazines. By 1991, it was airing in 53 Western markets. For the 1991–1992 television season, Kelly partnered with Paramount Domestic Television to distribute The West nationally, with a new version for markets east of the Mississippi River known as In America. In spite of carriage in 93 percent of the country, The West/In America was canceled at the end of the season. Kelly News and Entertainment was closed in March, owing to a poor advertising market, and its 40 employees laid off.

=== The early prime time experiment ===
Through the 1980s, affiliates of NBC on the West Coast, including KCRA-TV, expressed interest in shifting prime time an hour earlier, from 8–11 p.m. to 7–10 p.m. The stations believed there were more viewers available to watch their late local newscasts at 10 p.m. and that, unlike on the East Coast, television viewing peaked earlier. In July 1991, NBC authorized KCRA to begin a test of early prime time scheduling beginning September 16. KCRA concurrently filed for a waiver of the Prime Time Access Rule (PTAR), an FCC guideline that prevented more than three hours of network programming from airing in the period from 7 to 11 p.m., so that it could move The Tonight Show Starring Johnny Carson to 10:35 p.m.; the commission granted this on August 29. For KCRA, the November 1991 sweeps period bore out the strategy; the station was competitive against syndicated programming in the 7 p.m. hour, and its news at 10 attracted more viewers than the 11 p.m. newscasts in the market. Additionally, NBC's late night programs—The Tonight Show and Saturday Night Live—saw ratings increases. The loss in advertising revenue from the early prime shift resulted in 21 layoffs in June 1992, alongside the cancellation of weekday overnight news.

In 1993, NBC successfully pressured the two affiliates that had been testing it—KCRA and San Francisco's KRON-TV—to switch back. The change came as part of a renewal of KCRA's NBC affiliation agreement. While prime time ratings had remained steady, the local newscast had not met station expectations, and KCRA lost between $7 and $12 million in revenue. KCRA's owners, Jon and Robert Kelly, calculated that they could make more money by airing syndicated shows in the access hour than with a full 10 p.m. news hour; however, the station was attracting better ratings than other West Coast NBC affiliates.

The end of early prime time had a lasting impact on KCRA-TV, which continued to be interested in producing a 10 p.m. local newscast for air on another station. KSCH-TV (channel 58) began airing the KCRA-produced newscast on September 12, 1993; this started a relationship between the two stations that culminated in KCRA taking over programming under a local marketing agreement in 1994.

When a big news story breaks, most Central Valley TV viewers reflexively hit "3" on their remotes.

— Sam McManis, The Sacramento Bee

When flooding hit California on New Year's Day 1997, KCRA was in the middle of televising college football games. After the games, it initiated what turned out to be nearly 90 consecutive hours of coverage aired on KCRA and channel 58. During the coverage, LiveCopter 3 rescued a Border Collie from the rooftop of a building in flooded Yuba County, and employees at the flood operations center watched KCRA to get the latest updates. At times, audience shares for flood coverage surpassed 50 percent.

== Hearst ownership ==
=== Acquisition ===
KCRA's LiveCopter 3

Kelly Broadcasting only owned or operated three stations: KCRA-TV, KQCA (the former KSCH-TV), and KCPQ, an independent station and later Fox affiliate in Tacoma, Washington. In 1997, Bob Kelly and his son Chris sold their stakes in the company to family members Jon and Greg Kelly and KCPQ general manager Roger Ottenbach. This increased the debt Kelly Broadcasting held to some $250 million. Further, the three-station group was starting to lose out in acquiring syndicated programming to competitors who owned more stations in more markets. Greg Kelly (Jon's son) concluded, "We had to get big or get out, and we were not in a position to get big." In the summer of 1998, the Kellys sought a strategic partner or merger partner that would continue to leave them in operating control of their businesses, but no such deal materialized.

Kelly exited broadcasting in August 1998. KCRA and its local marketing agreement with KQCA, as well as the remnants of Kelly News and Entertainment, were sold to Hearst-Argyle Television for $520 or $530 million. Jon Kelly said he accepted Hearst-Argyle's bid over larger offers based on the company's ability to continue KCRA's legacy in news. KCPQ was sold for $370 million the same week. The deals were a shock to some industry observers. Dennis FitzSimons of Tribune Broadcasting put them in the same class with Hubbard Broadcasting and Sunbeam Television: small, family-run concerns that he believed would never exit broadcasting.

After Hearst closed on the purchase in January 1999, it exercised its option to buy KQCA outright ahead of the FCC authorizing duopolies—the outright ownership of two broadcast licenses in a market.

In April 2004, KCRA opened a secondary studio known as the KCRA Experience in Sacramento's Arden Fair Mall, allowing visitors to see a KCRA newscast be produced live. KCRA's noon newscast was broadcast from Arden Fair until late 2008, when production of the program was moved back to Television Circle. That same year, Walker and Hart retired from KCRA after 18 years; with their retirement, Edie Lambert, an anchor and reporter since 1995, was promoted to the lead anchor team. In 2009, the Hearst Corporation acquired Argyle's stake in Hearst-Argyle Television, took it private, and renamed it Hearst Television.

=== Digital and newscast expansion ===
KCRA satellite truck at the 2006 California International Marathon

KCRA launched a second subchannel featuring NBC Weather Plus in 2005. In August 2010, it was relaunched as MoreTV, programmed much like an independent station with reairs of syndicated programs. The MoreTV format was replaced by an affiliation with MeTV in 2012 as part of an expansion of the existing affiliation relationship between Hearst and MeTV.

During the 2010s and 2020s, KCRA regularly maintained its lead in local news, with KOVR generally the next highest-rated newscast. In May 2024, KCRA led in most news time slots including 11 p.m., and the 10 p.m. news for KQCA was second to KOVR. During this period, the station introduced a series of news expansions, including doubling the length of the KQCA 10 p.m. newscast to an hour in 2014 and launching a 4 p.m. weekday newscast in 2016, extended weekend evening newscasts in 2017, a 4 a.m. half-hour in 2018, a 7 p.m. newscast in 2020, and a 9 a.m. hour on KQCA in 2022. As of 2026, KCRA broadcast 45 hours of locally produced newscasts each week (with 7 1/2 hours each weekday, four hours on Saturdays and 3 1/2 hours on Sundays), plus 22 hours of dedicated newscasts on KQCA.

== Notable on-air staff ==
=== Current ===
- Edie Lambert – reporter and anchor, since 1995

=== Former ===
- Miguel Almaguer – reporter
- Stan Atkinson – anchor, 1957–1963, 1976–1994
- Maurice DuBois – anchor/reporter, c. 1990–1994
- Jon Duncanson – reporter
- Jim Finnerty – host of local talk show Finnerty and Company/Look Who's Talking, 1982–1985
- Gary Gerould – sports anchor, 1965–1977
- David Gregory – reporter, 1994–1995
- Kristine Hanson – sports and weather anchor, 1980–1988
- Lois Hart – reporter and anchor, 1990–2008
- Lester Holt – news intern and part-time employee while in high school, 1976–1977
- Bob Hogue – sports director, 1984–1988
- Joe Lizura – meteorologist, 1987–1989
- Joan Lunden – anchor and reporter, 1974–1975
- Rob Malcolm – 10 p.m. anchor and reporter, 2010s
- Rob Mayeda – meteorologist, 1998–2002
- Stu Nahan – sportscaster and host of the children's show Skipper Stu, 1956–1965
- Leyna Nguyen – anchor/reporter, 1990s
- Don Poier – sports anchor, 1977–1980
- Jeff Ranieri – meteorologist, 2000–2005
- Tom Rinaldi – sports reporter, 1997–1998
- Del Rodgers – sports director, 1997–2025
- Bianca Solorzano – reporter and weekend morning anchor, 1999–2003
- Tom Sullivan – financial editor, 1982–2007
- Kaity Tong – anchor, 1978–1981
- Dave Walker – reporter and anchor, 1990–2008
- Brad Willis – consumer reporter, to 1984

== Technical information ==
=== Subchannels ===
KCRA-TV's transmitter is located in Walnut Grove, California. The station's signal is multiplexed:

Subchannels of KCRA-TV
Subchannel	Res.	Short name	Programming
3.1	1080i	KCRA-TV	NBC
3.2	480i	Me-TV	MeTV
3.3	480i	KCRA-3	Story Television
3.4	480i	KCRA-4	QVC2
58.1	1080i	KQCA	The CW & MyNetworkTV (KQCA)
58.2	480i	H and I	Heroes & Icons (KQCA)

Subchannel broadcast with MPEG-4 video
Broadcast on behalf of another station

=== Analog-to-digital conversion ===
KCRA-TV began broadcasting a digital signal on October 1, 1999. The station ended regular programming on its analog signal, over VHF channel 3, on June 12, 2009, as part of the federally mandated transition from analog to digital television. The station's digital signal remained on its pre-transition UHF channel 35, using virtual channel 3.

=== Translators ===
Two translators rebroadcast KCRA-TV's signal:

- Litchfield: K30PZ-D
- Ukiah: K17CG-D

== Carriage disputes ==
For years, residents in South Lake Tahoe received KCRA via cable, even though it is assigned into the Reno, Nevada, media market. This changed in June 2018, when Charter Communications's Spectrum cable service stopped distributing KCRA, leaving only Reno's KRNV, then an NBC affiliate, on its lineup. Charter reiterated it was company policy to carry only the in-market network affiliates. The move angered residents of South Lake Tahoe, with many saying Charter's decision to drop KCRA left cable customers without access to coverage of local news and California issues. Officials in El Dorado County analyzed petitioning the FCC to move South Lake Tahoe from the Reno market into the Sacramento market. As of 2023, no market modification petition had been filed. Similarly, due to Hearst's demands for additional fees to carry out–of–market stations, Comcast dropped KCRA from Xfinity systems in parts of Contra Costa and Solano counties in 2021.
