= California Assembly Bill 1634 (2007) =

AB 1634 was a 2007 bill (authored by Democrat Lloyd Levine) in the California State Legislature which would require that dogs and cats in California be spayed or neutered by 6 months of age.

The bill would have provided limited availability for purchased "intact permits" and a small number of exemptions. The bill passed the California Assembly by the narrowest of margins on June 6, 2007, but was deferred by Assemblyman Levine on July 11, 2007 when it became apparent that it would not pass in the California Senate Local Government committee where it had been assigned. Levine has stated his intention to reintroduce the bill in 2008. The sponsor of the bill, Social Compassion in Legislation, has introduced a new spay/neuter bill, Senate Bill SB 250.

Bill supporters and bill opponents both claimed a large number of followers, and the 2007 hearings on the bill in Sacramento resulted in some of the largest and most passionate crowds of the year in the Capitol. The bill generated the most letters and calls of any California legislation in 2007.

== Support and opposition ==
AB 1634 was generally supported by animal shelter directors and workers, animal rights groups, animal rescue groups, Societies for the Prevention of Cruelty to Animals, humane societies, and the Los Angeles city government. The bill received an enormous amount of media attention.

The bill was generally opposed by pet owners, breed clubs, breeders of working dogs, search-and-rescue dog associations, K9 law enforcement associations, organizations that provide guide dogs for the blind and service dogs for the disabled, California's agriculture industry, animal rescue groups, leaders in the No Kill movement, and many veterinarians.

Supporters of the bill claim that legislative action is needed, because about 400,000 animals are euthanized (killed) in California's shelters each year, that animal shelter services cost California taxpayers $250 million a year, that a dog born in California currently has nearly a 1 in 4 chance of being ultimately euthanized in a shelter, that similar laws in individual communities in California have been successful, proving the validity of the mandatory spay/neuter concept, and that spay and neuter improve animal health.

Opponents of the bill claim that erroneous shelter statistics are being used to support the bill, and that the experiences where mandatory spay/neuter laws have been implemented show that they increase costs to the taxpayers, and increase shelter impound and euthanasia rates, that non-punitive No Kill programs have proven to be more effective solutions, and that official state shelter statistics indicate that impound and euthanasia rates have been generally trending downward in California for more than 30 years, that passage of the bill would harm breeding programs for pets, guide dogs and service dogs, search-and-rescue dogs, police dogs, military working dogs, hunting dogs, and working herding and livestock guardian dogs, and that spay and neuter have adverse health impacts that need to be weighed against the benefits, therefore spay and neuter should be decisions made between the owner in consultation with their veterinarian based on the health needs and circumstances of each individual patient, rather than one that is dictated by the state, and, finally, that a majority of veterinary medical associations in California oppose AB 1634.
