= Rob Mayeda =

American meteorologist

Rob Mayeda (born, c. 1971) is a meteorologist, reporter, storm chaser, and segment producer for KNTV in San Jose, California.

== Education ==
Mayeda attended Chaminade College Preparatory in West Hills, California and graduated from the University of Arizona, Tucson in 1994 with a bachelor's degree in Journalism and English. He completed a Master of Science degree in Geosciences at Mississippi State University. Mayeda now provides guest lecturing/instruction work at Cal State East Bay in Hayward, California and San José State University in San Jose, California.

== Career ==
Mayeda was hired as a production associate for the ABC network news bureau to work on the network's various news magazine shows 20/20, Primetime Live and Turning Point.

He returned to KNBC as an editorial assistant and eventually joined the special news projects department for the production of Channel 4 News' O. J. Simpson: The Trial. This daily broadcast followed the O. J. Simpson case from the start of the trial to the eventual verdict. Airing both on KNBC and CNBC this program featured prominent local attorneys as "legal analysts" who offered opinions on the daily events in court.

He was later hired by KESQ in Palm Desert, California as a weekend weather anchor and eventually morning weather anchor once KESQ launched its weekday morning newscast.

Less than two years later, Mayeda joined KSBY in San Luis Obispo, California as a weekend weather anchor and news reporter. Mayeda took on the same role for KCRA in Sacramento, California in 1997.

Mayeda earned an Emmy award in 2002 for "On Camera News: Weather" from the Northern California National Academy of Television Arts and Sciences. He was also nominated for another Emmy in 2008 as segment producer for "From Dreams To Dust," a documentary about the Japanese American internment camps during World War II.

He worked as a weekday weather anchor for KIRO-TV in Seattle, Washington for two years before returning to California where he was hired at KNTV. Mayeda was recently assigned to weekend morning and evening newscasts while working on news special projects.

Mayeda's work as a videographer/producer aired on NBC Bay Area for "On Thin Ice", a climate change special focusing on Alaska's melting glaciers. The American Meteorological Society awarded "On Thin Ice" its "Excellence in Science Reporting by a Broadcast Meteorologist" honor in October 2011.

In 2011, he earned his second Emmy award for "On Camera Talent Anchor: Weather" from the Northern California National Academy of Television Arts and Sciences

Mayeda holds the American Meteorological Society television seal of approval.
