= Rob Malcolm =

American journalist for WNYW

Rob Malcolm is a black British journalist for WNYW. Joining the station in the beginning of 2007, Malcolm is a former football player. He replaced James Ford, now with WPIX-TV, the CW affiliate in New York.

Malcolm's first job in journalism was at CKRY radio. He spent a year reporting on sports in Toronto before finding a sports position in Detroit.

Starting on the weekend of August 11, 2007, Malcolm was one of many to replace Reid Lamberty as presenter on the weekend editions of FOX 5 News in New York. Lamberty has been promoted to weekday mornings with the Good Day New York team.
