= Brad Willis (journalist) =

American journalist

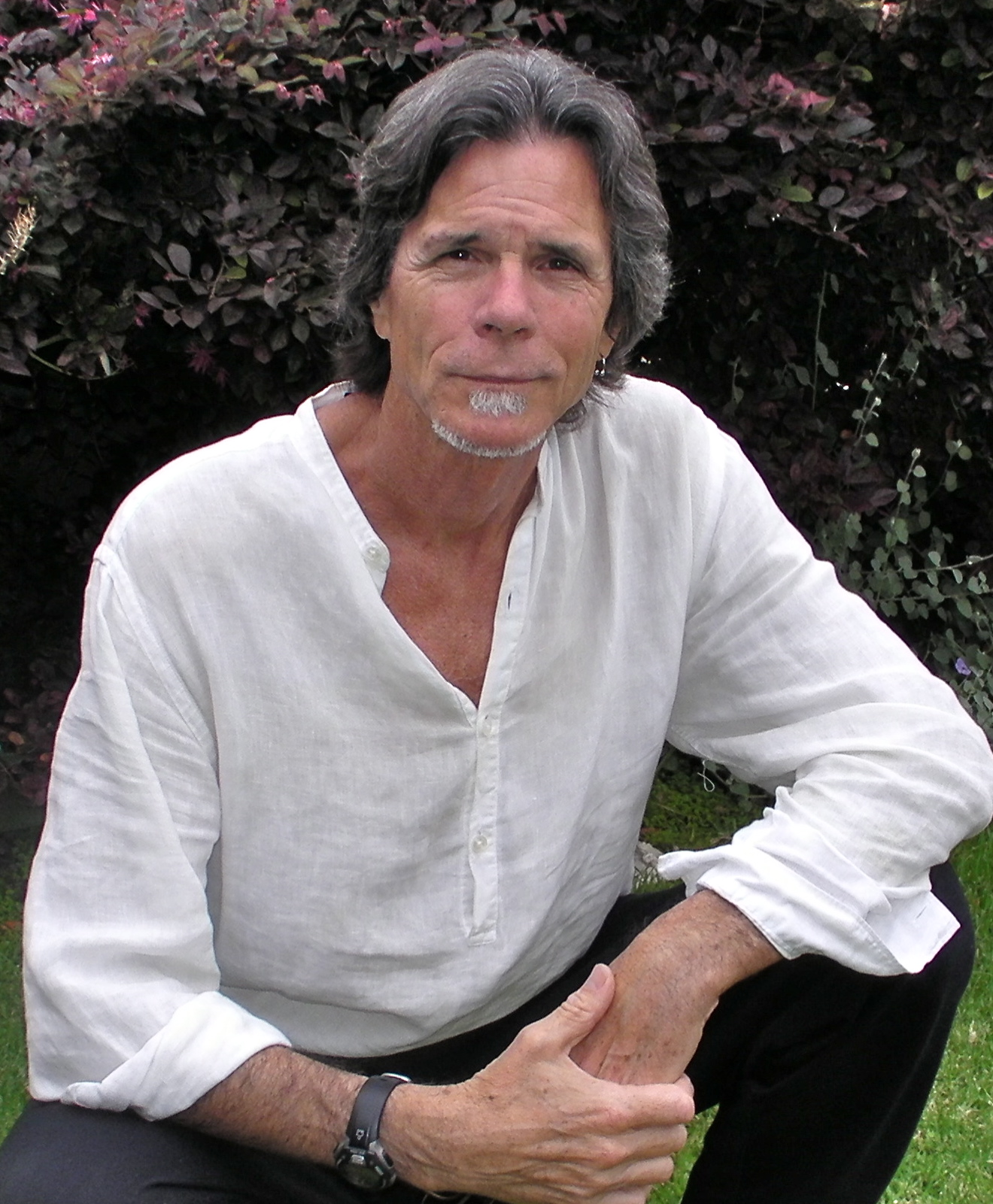
- Brad Willis in 2011
- Born: August 27, 1949 (age 77); Los Angeles, California, U.S.
- Occupation: Journalist
- Awards: Alfred I. duPont–Columbia University Award

Brad Willis (born August 27, 1949) is a retired NBC News foreign correspondent and author. As a journalist, Willis was the recipient of the Alfred I. duPont–Columbia University Award for his work from inside Afghanistan during the Soviet Occupation in 1986.

== Early life ==
Willis was born in Los Angeles, California, the youngest of three children. As a teenager coming of age in the 1960s, he was actively involved in the national protest movement against the Vietnam War. From 1969-73, he attended Humboldt State University in Arcata, California, earning a degree in English Literature and a Secondary Teaching Credential. Forsaking a planned career in academia, he left graduate school and joined KVIQ as a news reporter. Within two years, Willis was the news director, anchor and investigative reporter for KVIQ.

== Broadcast career ==
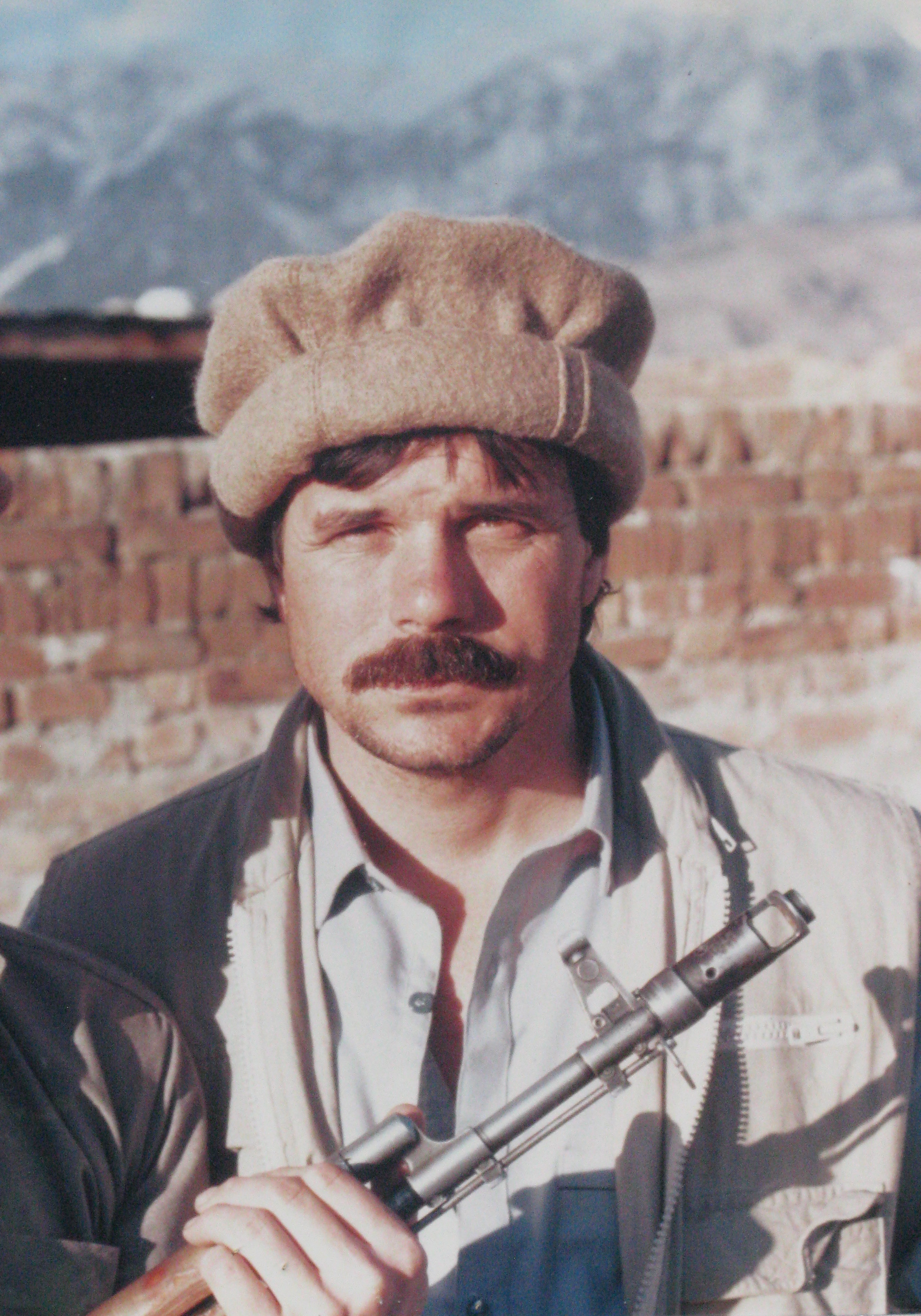
NBC Journalist in Afghanistan 1986

Willis worked for KVIQ beginning in 1970, earning several awards from the Associated Press and United Press International for his investigative reporting.

In 1976, he was recruited by KCRA-TV in Sacramento, California where he became an award winning investigative reporter for the news division.

In 1984 he was hired by WFAA-TV, Dallas, Texas and continued as an investigative journalist. During this time, he produced major investigative reports on corruption involving national politics and corporate business. His reports from Venezuela on a Texas oil executive wrongly imprisoned in an international oil scandal led to eventual freedom for the American.

In 1986 Willis moved to WBZ-TV in Boston, Massachusetts, and continued his career as an investigative journalist. He launched WBZ's first foray into global news coverage with reports from Afghanistan during the Soviet/Afghan War. His documentary covering his time with the mujahideen and in the massive refugee camps along the Afghan/Pakistani border earned him the Alfred I. duPont–Columbia University Award. On vacation afterwards, he fell from a ledge battening down storm windows in the tropics and fractured his lower spine. Despite constant pain, he continued working for seven more years.

Willis subsequently reported on the struggle against apartheid in Africa from Botswana, Zambia and Zaire, the drug wars in Colombia, Bolivia and Peru, the reopening of US/Vietnamese relations in Hanoi with Senators John Kerry and John McCain, and efforts to help the indigenous people of the Guatemalan highlands. In 1987, he was given the Gabriel Award for broadcast excellence with a positive and creative treatment of concerns to mankind for his work in Guatemala.

In 1989, Willis began a career with NBC News as a foreign correspondent posted to the Miami Bureau and covering Latin and South America. His major areas of focus included El Salvador, Nicaragua, Panama, Cuba and Colombia.

In 1990 Willis was dispatched to the Middle East to cover the Persian Gulf War for NBC. He was on the front lines of Operation Desert Storm and Operation Provide Comfort. As the network Pool Reporter for the First Marines, he covered the Battle of Khafji and the liberation of Kuwait, reporting live from Kuwait City with NBC New anchor Tom Brokaw. Willis then moved into northern Iraq to cover the Kurdish refugee crisis.

In 1992, Willis was posted to Hong Kong as the NBC correspondent for covering Asia. He reported from China, Japan, Vietnam, Thailand, Taiwan and the Philippines.

== Post-journalism career ==
In 1993, Willis suffered a severe break in his lower back from the injury seven years earlier. A fusion-laminectomy operation failed, left him deeply disabled and ended his career with NBC News. In 2000, Willis was diagnosed with oropharyngeal cancer and given little chance of surviving the disease.

Willis turned to ayurvedic medicine and yoga, with his cancer later going into remission. In 2013, he published a memoir, Warrior Pose, on this time in his life.

Willis holds certification in Ayurveda from the Kerala Ayurveda Academy and is certified as an Advanced Yoga and Ayurveda Educator through the American Institute of Vedic Studies. He has led trainings and retreats in the U.S. and internationally, plus lectured and provided keynote speeches to medical schools, executive groups, and holistic health practitioners.

From 2020-2022, Willis served as Commissioner of Public Art for the City of Coronado.

== Personal life ==
Willis was based in Coronado, California as of 2013. He is married and has a son.

== Publications ==
=== Books ===
- Deep Yoga: Ancient Wisdom for Modern Times. Lotus Press. 2008. ISBN 978-1-60402-981-9.
- The Eight Limbs of Yoga: Pathway to Liberation. Lotus Press. 2009. ISBN 978-1-60725-907-7.
- Willis, Brad (2013). Warrior Pose: How Yoga Literally Saved My Life. BenBella Books. ISBN 978-1937856694.
