= David Walker (journalist) =

American television news anchor (born 1941)

- Born: David Edward Walker; 1941 (age 84–85)
- Education: University of South Florida
- Spouse: Lois Hart (m. 1979)

David Edward Walker (born 1941) is an American retired television news anchor. He and his wife Lois Hart were paired as television news anchors for nearly three decades, starting in 1980 when they were among the original founding anchors on CNN through 2008 on Sacramento, California station KCRA.

== Early life ==
Walker grew up in Tampa, Florida, graduating from Henry B. Plant High School in 1960 and the University of South Florida in 1964 with a bachelor's degree in sociology.

== Career ==
Walker began his journalism career in the 1960s in Orlando, Florida with WFTV and WESH-TV. In the 1970s, he moved to Sacramento with KOVR and KCRA. In 1980, Walker and co-anchor (and wife) Lois Hart left Sacramento to join CNN in Atlanta, Georgia, and co-anchored CNN's first news broadcast. In 1989, he joined CNBC and anchored its first news program. In 1990, Walker and Hart decided to return to Sacramento, where they anchored evening news broadcasts until 2008.

On November 26, 2008, Walker and Hart retired from KCRA.
