= Waneta Hoyt =

American serial killer

- Born: Waneta Ethel Nixon; May 13, 1946; Richford, New York, U.S.
- Died: August 13, 1998 (aged 52); Bedford, New York, U.S.
- Conviction: Second degree murder (5 counts)
- Penalty: 75 years to life in prison

Details
- Victims: 5
- Span of crimes: 1965–1971
- Country: United States
- State: New York
- Date apprehended: 1994; 32 years ago

Waneta Ethel (Nixon) Hoyt (May 13, 1946 – August 13, 1998) was an American serial killer who was convicted of killing all five of her biological children.

== Biography ==
=== Early life and marriage ===
Hoyt was born in Richford, New York. She attended Newark Valley High School until she was in 10th grade then dropped out to marry Tim Hoyt on 11 January 1964.

=== Children ===
After Hoyt married Tim, the couple would go on to have seven children (five biological; one permanently adopted; and one temporarily adopted). All biological children of Hoyt died before reaching 29 months of age.

The names of all 7 children include:

1. Eric Hoyt (17 October 1964 – 26 January 1965)
2. James Hoyt (31 May 1966 – 26 September 1968)
3. Julie (19 July – 5 September 1968)
4. Molly (18 March – 5 June 1970)
5. Noah (9 May – 28 July 1971)
6. Scott (temporarily adopted August 1971; taken away from Hoyt's care once she told her psychiatrist that she was afraid that she would harm him)
7. Jay (permanently adopted 1977; was under Hoyt's care until her arrest in 1994)

After the deaths of her five biological children, for more than two decades after all the children died, it was believed they died from Sudden Infant Death Syndrome (SIDS). In 1994, Hoyt confessed to the deaths of her five children, was arrested, convicted as a murderer, and died in prison from cancer four years later in 1998.

The last two biological Hoyt children, Molly and Noah, were subjects of pediatric research conducted by Dr. Alfred Steinschneider, who published an article in 1972 in the journal Pediatrics proposing a connection between sleep apnea and SIDS. The article was later discredited, and subsequent research failed to replicate the results.

== Investigation and trial ==
In 1985, a prosecutor in a neighboring county who had been dealing with a murder case initially thought to involve SIDS, was told by one of his experts, Dr. Linda Norton, a forensic pathologist from Dallas, Texas, that there may be a serial killer in his area of New York. Norton arrived at this suspicion after reviewing Steinschneider's report on the Hoyt case in which the Hoyts were not identified by name. When the prosecutor became the district attorney in 1992, he tracked the case down and sent it to forensic pathologist Michael Baden, for review. Baden concluded that the deaths were the result of murder.

In 1994, because of jurisdictional issues, the case was transferred to the district attorney of the county in which the Hoyts resided.

In March 1994, Hoyt was approached at the post office by a New York State trooper with whom she was acquainted. He asked her for help in research he was doing on SIDS, and she agreed. She was then questioned by the trooper and two other policemen. At the end of the interrogation, she confessed to the murders of all five children by suffocation, and she was arrested. The reason that she gave for the murders was that the babies were crying and she wanted to silence them.

Hoyt later recanted her confession, and its validity was an important issue during the trial. An expert hired by the defense, Dr. Charles Patrick Ewing, testified, "It is my conclusion that her statement to the police on that day was not made knowingly, and it was not made voluntarily." He diagnosed Hoyt with dependent and avoidant personality disorders, and he opined that she was particularly vulnerable to the tactics used during her interrogation.

Dr. David Barry, a psychiatrist hired by the prosecution agreed that Hoyt had been manipulated by the police tactics. Nevertheless, Hoyt was convicted in April 1995.

On September 11, 1995, she was sentenced to 75 years to life, 15 years for each murder, to be served consecutively. It has been speculated since her conviction that Hoyt suffered from Münchausen syndrome by proxy, a diagnosis that is not universally accepted in the psychiatric community.

== Aftermath ==
Hoyt died in prison of pancreatic cancer in August 1998. She was formally exonerated under New York law because she died before her appeal. She was buried at Highland Cemetery in Richford, New York.

== See also ==
- List of serial killers in the United States
