= Lois Hart =

American journalist (born 1950)

Lois Hackbert Hart Walker (born February 5, 1950, in Atlanta, Georgia) is a retired journalist. She co-anchored the evening news in Sacramento on KCRA-TV with her husband, Dave Walker, from 1990 through 2008.

Lois first joined KCRA in the 1970s and later worked at KOVR. After her marriage to Dave Walker in 1979, the two left Sacramento to join CNN in Atlanta, Georgia, whose very first newscast they anchored in 1980. In 1989, they left CNN to anchor for CNBC; Hart anchored CNBC Mornings, Money Wheel, and America's Vital Signs. The two returned to KCRA in 1990.

Hart and Walker retired on November 26, 2008.
