= Mass media in Los Angeles =

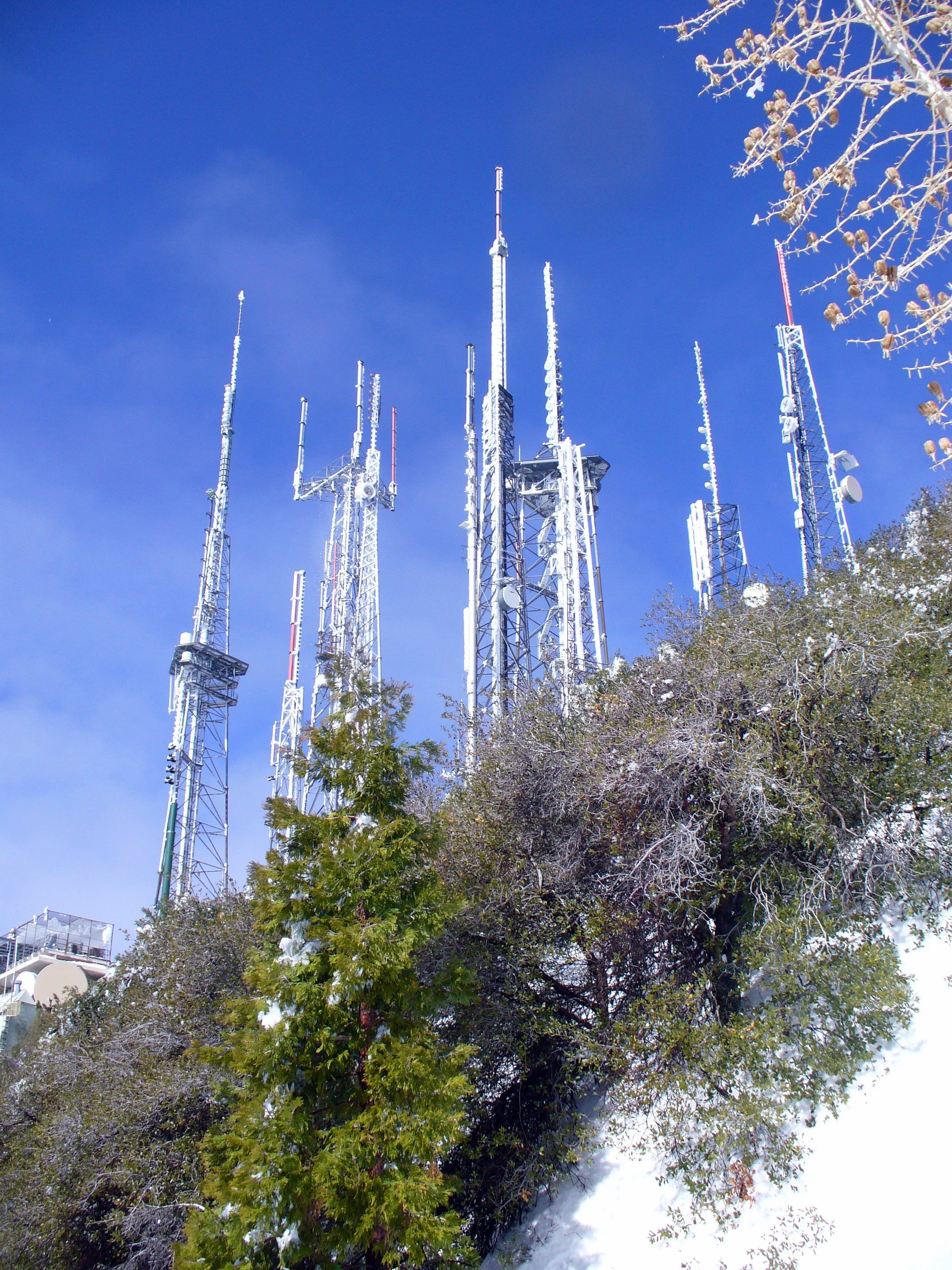
Antennas on Mount Wilson, a major transmitter site for Los Angeles radio and TV stations

The media of Los Angeles are influential and include some of the most important production facilities in the world. As part of the "Creative Capital of the World", it is a major global center for media and entertainment. In addition to being the home of Hollywood, the center of the American motion picture industry, the Los Angeles area is the second largest media market in North America (after New York City). Many of the nation's media conglomerates either have their primary headquarters (like The Walt Disney Company) or their West Coast operations (like NBCUniversal) based in the region. Universal Music Group, one of the "Big Four" record labels, is also based in the Los Angeles area.

The major daily newspaper is the Los Angeles Times, while La Opinión is the city's major daily Spanish-language paper. The Hollywood Reporter and Variety are significant entertainment industry papers in Los Angeles. There are also a wide variety of smaller regional newspapers, alternative weeklies and magazines, including LA Weekly, Los Angeles magazine, the Los Angeles Business Journal, the Los Angeles Daily Journal, and the Los Angeles Downtown News. In addition to the English- and Spanish-language papers, numerous local periodicals serve immigrant communities in their native languages, including Korean, Persian, Russian and Japanese.

Los Angeles neighborhoods also have community weekly newspapers and news websites, which include The Argonaut, Westside Today and the Westside Current, which covers the Westside neighborhoods, Park La Brea News, which covers the Park La Brea and Miracle Mile neighborhoods and The Eastsider which covers Boyle Heights, East Los Angeles, Northeast Los Angeles neighborhoods, Echo Park, Silver Lake, Atwater Village, Los Feliz and East Hollywood.

The Southern California News Group, a subsidiary of Digital First Media, operates eleven other regional daily newspapers in greater Los Angeles, with all covering four of the five Los Angeles DMA counties. The Los Angeles Daily News, published in the San Fernando Valley community of Woodland Hills, serves as the flagship newspaper of SCNG in Los Angeles County; other publications under the SCNG umbrella include the Torrance-based Daily Breeze (serving the South Bay and southwestern Los Angeles County), Long Beach Press-Telegram which serves Long Beach and Gateway Cities, San Gabriel Valley Tribune serves the central and eastern San Gabriel Valley, the Whittier Daily News serves the Greater Whittier area, the Pasadena Star-News serves the Greater Pasadena area and the Orange County Register, which SCNG acquired (along with the Riverside Press-Enterprise) from Freedom Communications in March 2016.

Los Angeles arts, culture and nightlife news is also covered by a number of local and national online guides like Time Out Los Angeles, Thrillist, Kristin's List, LAist, LA Taco, and Flavorpill.

== Film ==
The city's Hollywood neighborhood is notable as the home of the U.S. film industry, and its name has come to be a shorthand reference for the industry and the people in it. The industry's "Big Five" major film studios (Sony, Disney, Paramount, Universal, and Warner Bros.) are all based in or around Hollywood. Several other smaller and independent film companies also operate in the Los Angeles area.

The Big Five major film studios

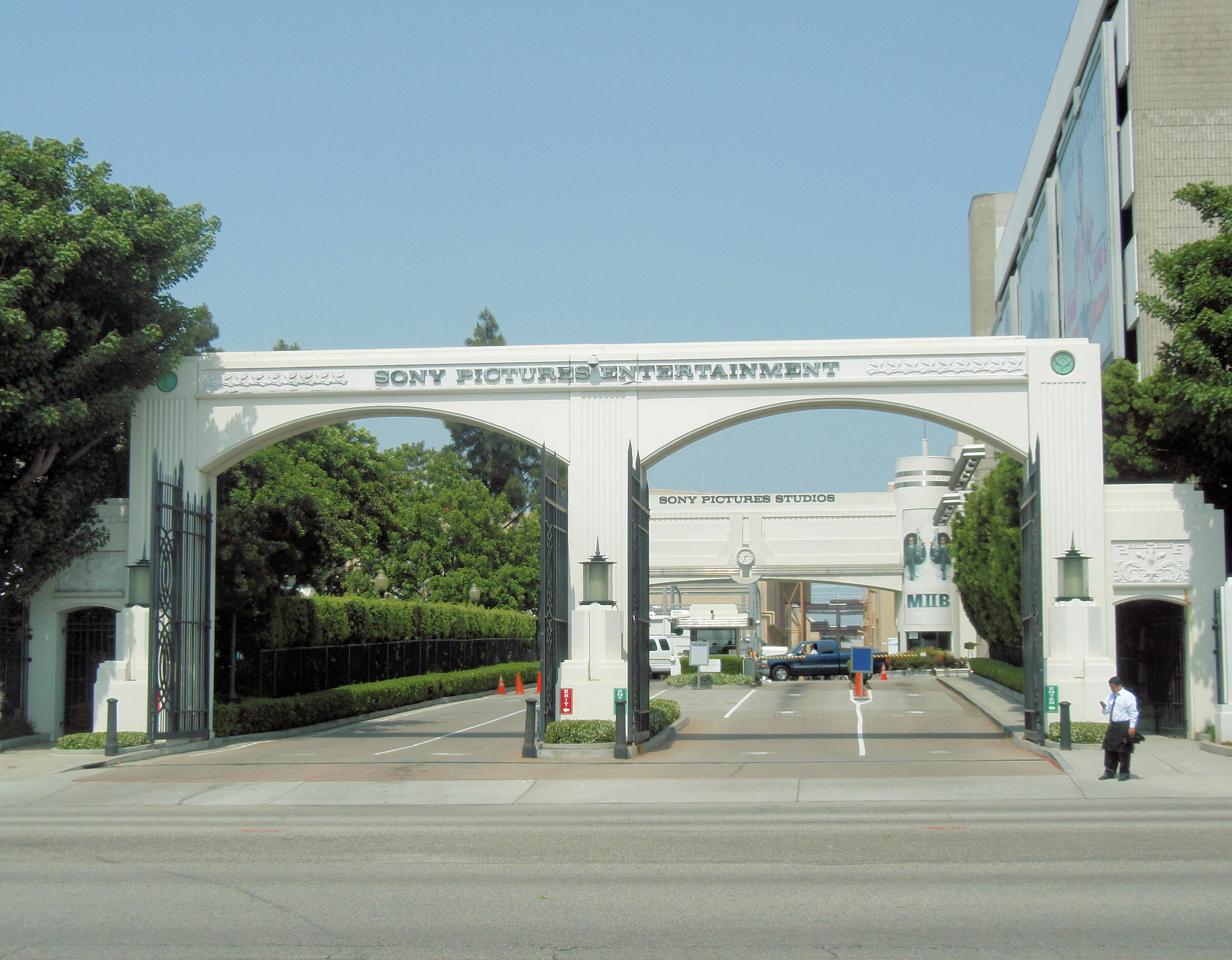
Sony

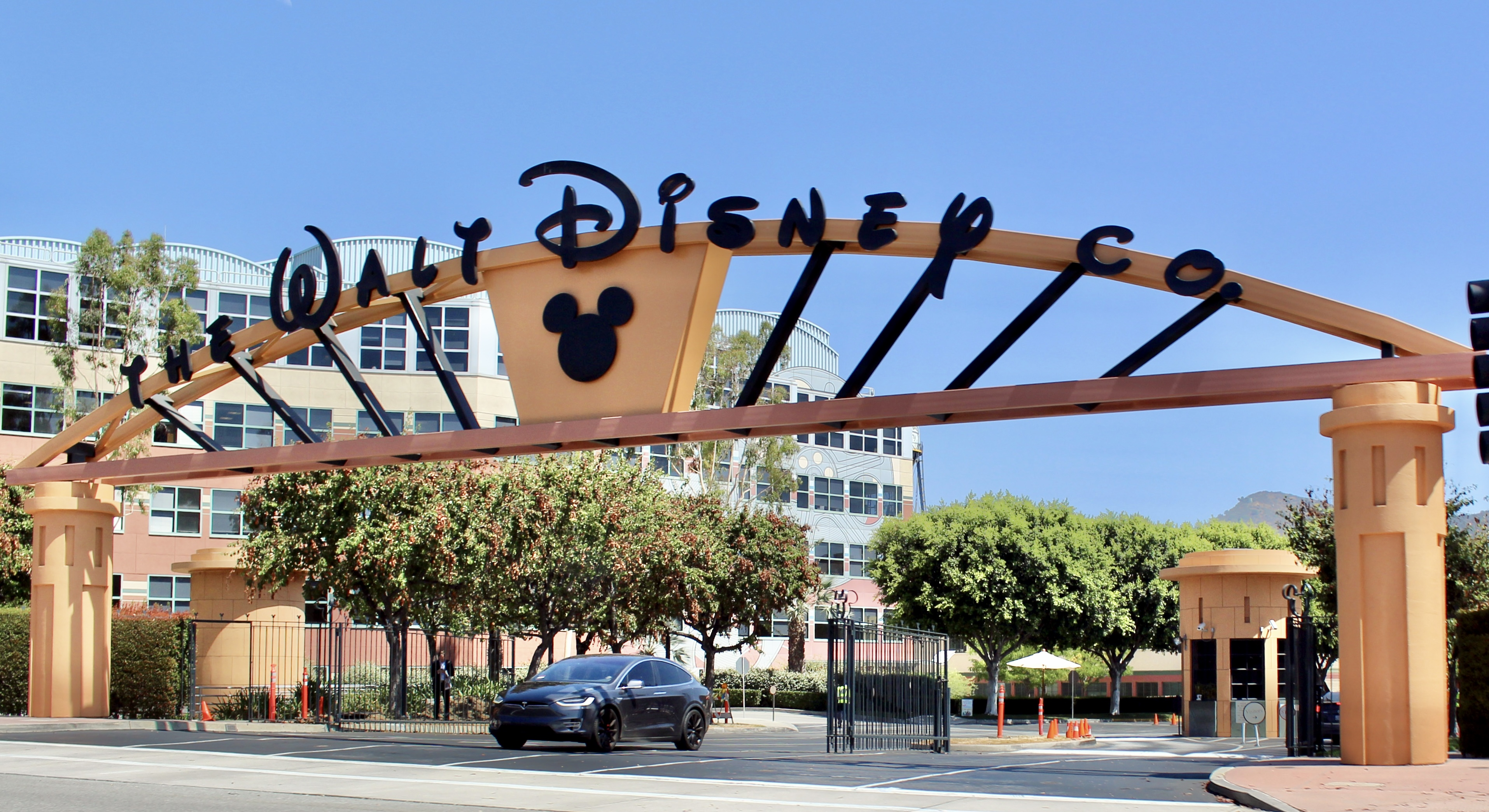
Disney

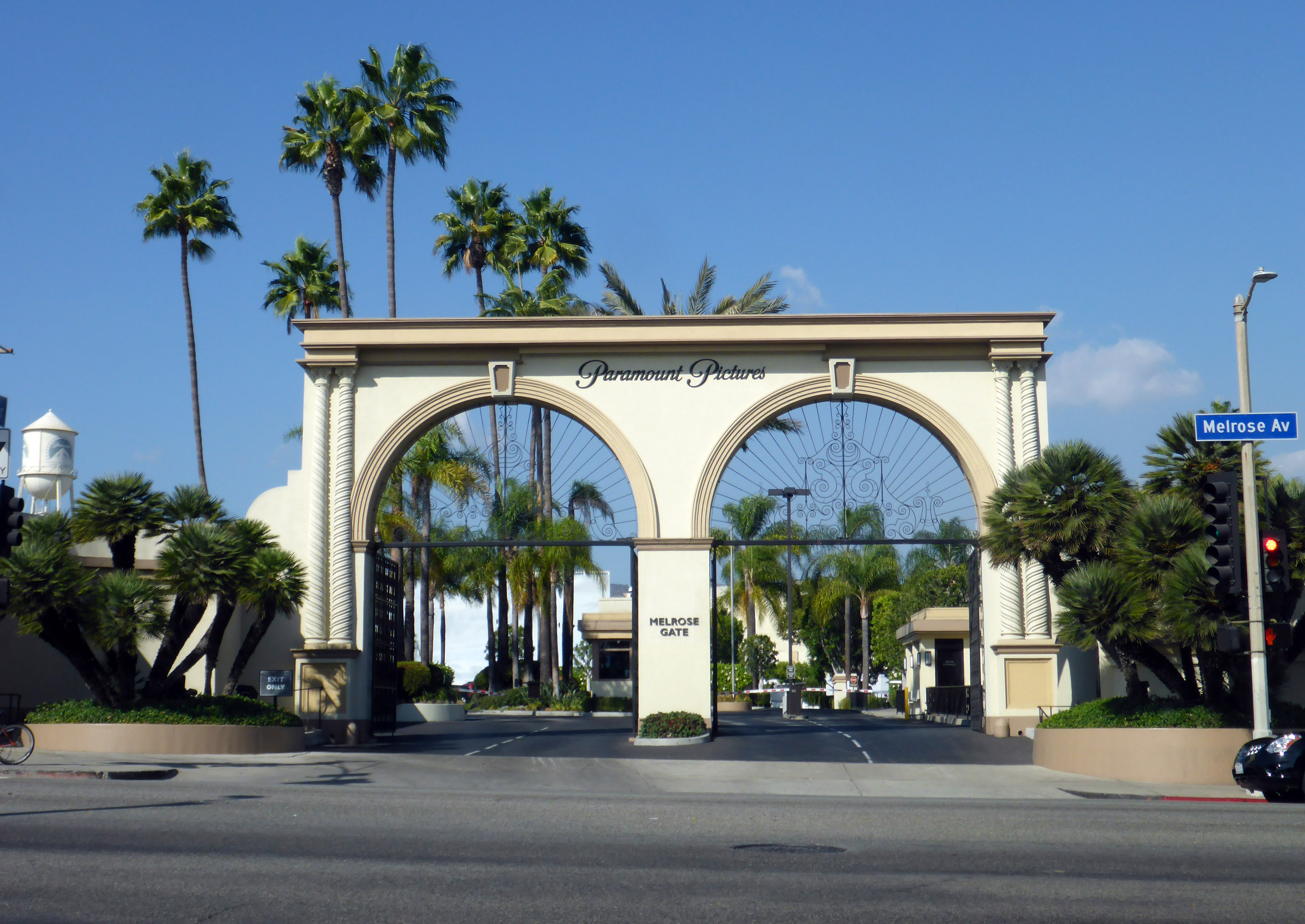
Paramount

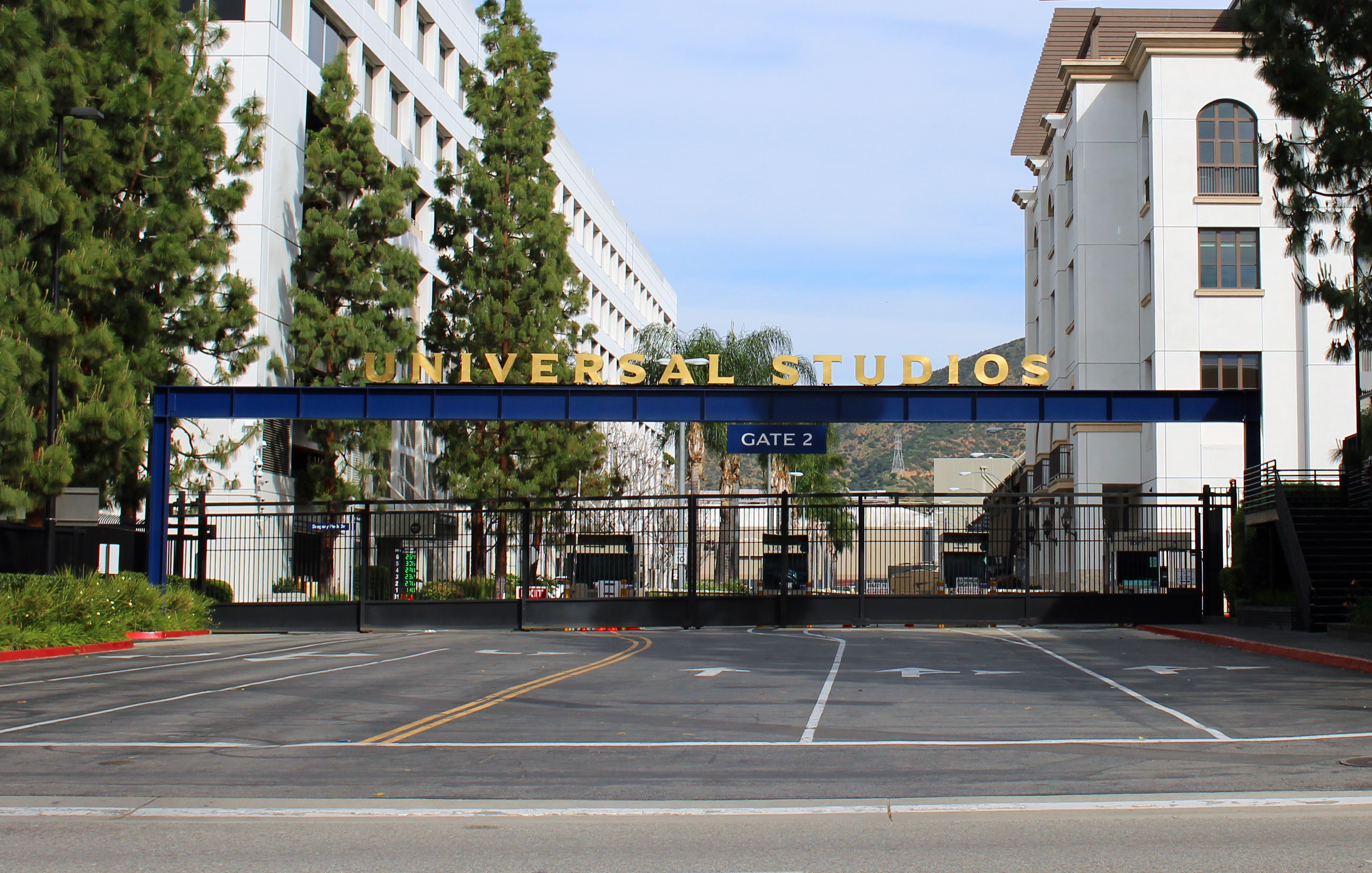
Universal

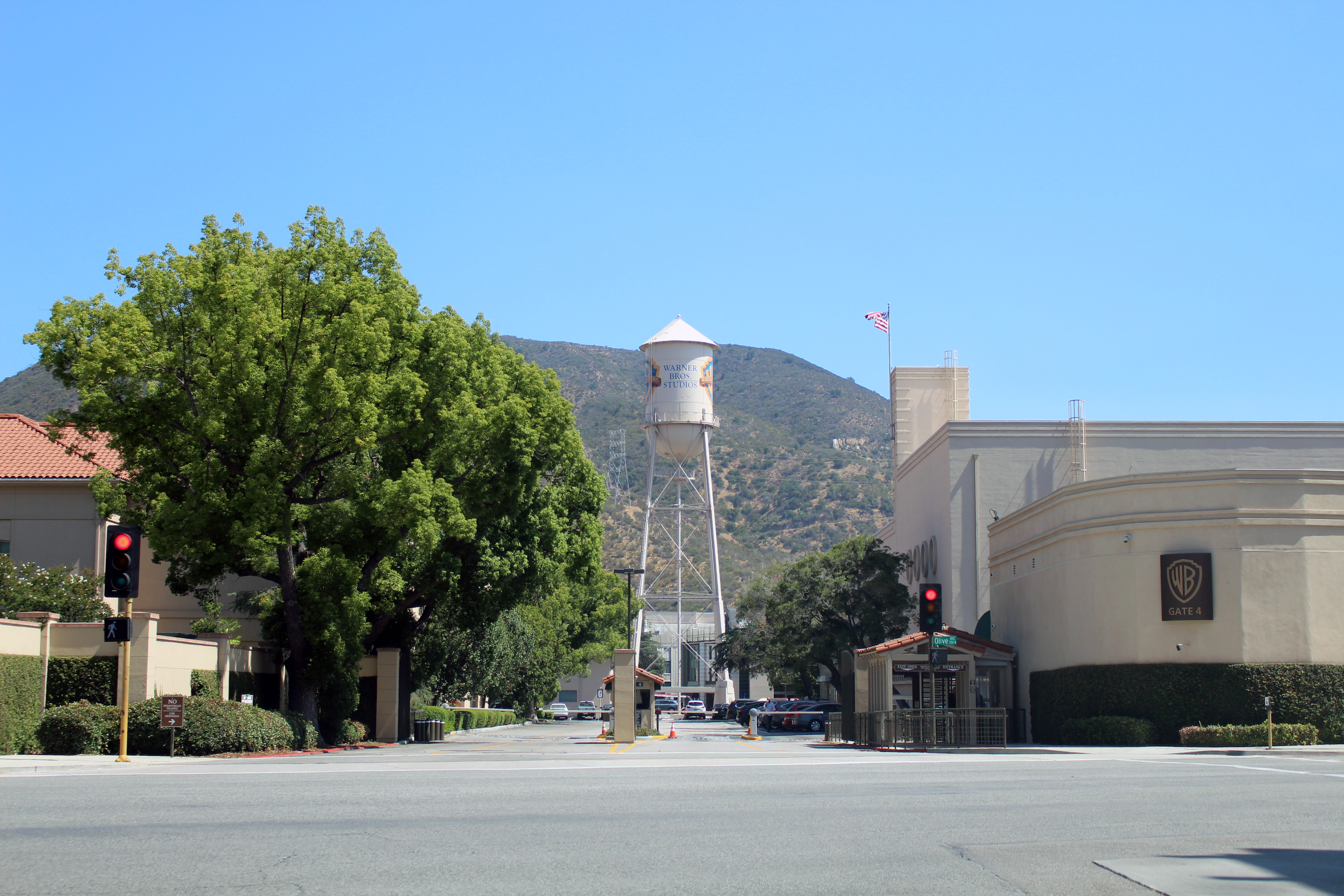
Warner Bros.

== Print media ==
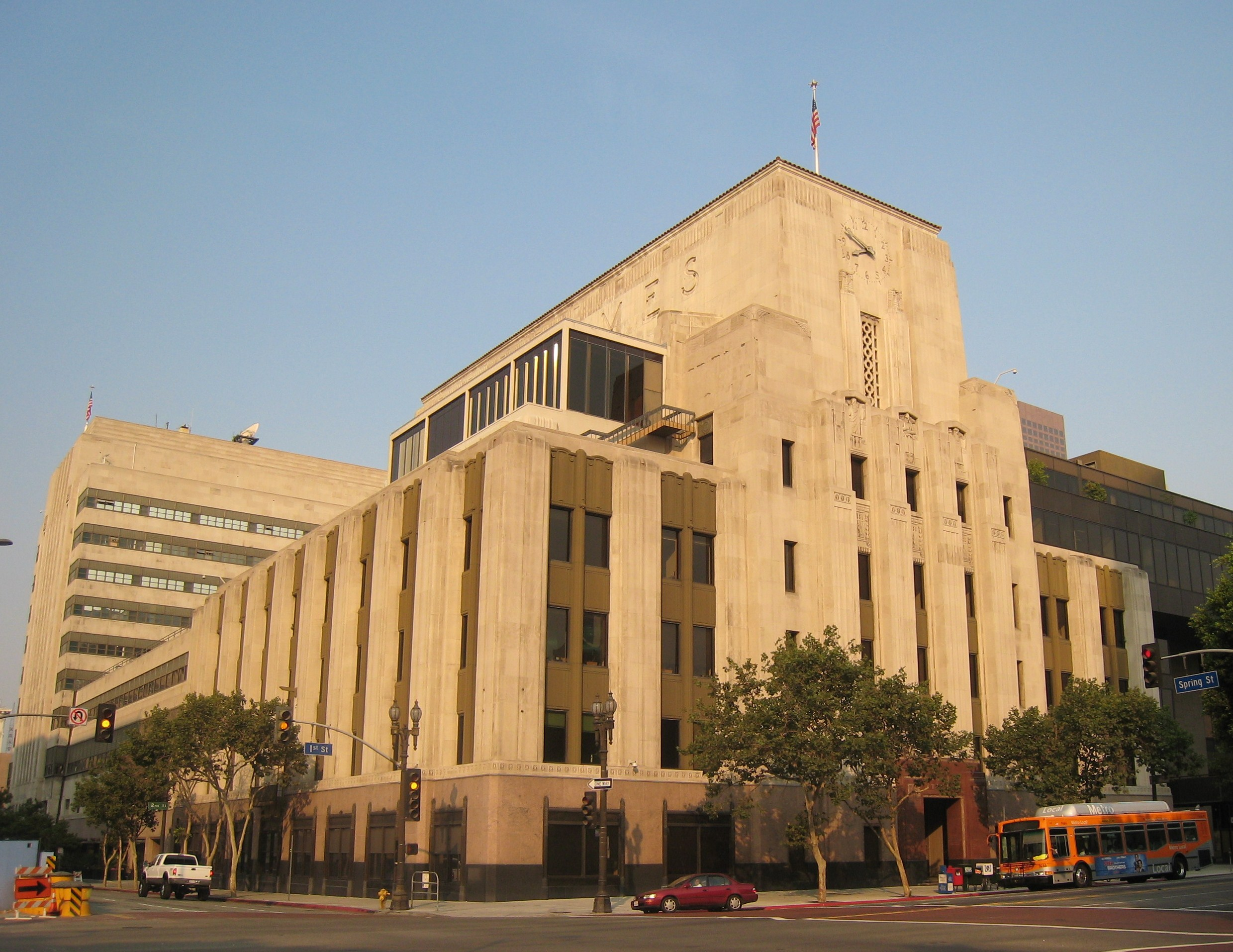
Former Los Angeles Times headquarters in Downtown Los Angeles

=== Daily newspapers ===
- Asbarez (Armenian)
- The Epoch Times (Chinese)
- Hoy (Spanish)
- Investor's Business Daily
- The Korea Times (Korean)
- The Los Angeles Bulletin and Civic Center NEWSource
- Los Angeles Daily Journal (legal daily)
- Los Angeles Daily News
- Los Angeles Times
- Santa Monica Daily Press
- Metropolitan News-Enterprise (legal daily)
- MyNewsLA
- La Opinión (Spanish)
- Người Việt Daily News (Vietnamese)
- Rafu Shimpo (Japanese)
- San Fernando Valley Sun
- The Daily Telescope
- Viễn Đông Daily News (Vietnamese)
- Việt Báo Daily News (Vietnamese)
- World Journal (Chinese)

=== Weekly, biweekly and monthly newspapers ===
- Argonaut (Marina del Rey/Culver City community weekly)
- Beverly Press (community weekly)
- CaribPress (Caribbean monthly)
- The Century City News (community bi-weekly)
- Cultural News (English-language Japanese monthly)
- India Journal (Indian weekly)
- The Jewish Journal of Greater Los Angeles (Jewish weekly)
- L.A. Watts Times (community weekly)
- LA Weekly (alternative weekly)
- Larchmont Chronicle (community weekly)
- Los Angeles Asian Journal (Filipino biweekly)
- Los Angeles Blade (LGBT+ biweekly)
- Los Angeles Business Journal (business weekly)
- Los Angeles Downtown News (community weekly)
- Los Angeles Free Press (weekly underground newspaper)
- The Los Angeles Independent (community weekly)
- Los Angeles Sentinel (African-American weekly)
- Los Angeles Wave - Culver City edition (community weekly)
- "Our Weekly" - Black, African-American news and information. www.ourweekly.com
  - Culver City Star
  - PACE NEWS-African-American news. www.pacenewsonline.com
  - The Westsider
- Los Angeles Wave - Northeast edition (community weekly)
  - Belvedere Citizen
  - Eagle Rock Sentinel
  - East L.A. Tribune
  - Eastside Journal
  - Highland Park News Herald & Journal
  - Lincoln Heights Bulletin
  - Mount Washington Star Review
  - El Sereno Star
- Los Angeles Wave - West edition (community weekly)
  - Angeles Mesa News
  - Central News Wave
  - Inglewood/Hawthorne Wave
  - Southside Journal
  - Southwest Topics Wave
  - Tribune News
- Los Feliz Ledger (community monthly)
- Pacific Citizen (Asian-American semi-monthly)
- Palisadian-Post (community weekly)
- Park Labrea News (community weekly)
- The Pride LA
- The Angelus (Catholic weekly - Formerly The Tidings)
- The Tolucan Times (community weekly)
- Valley Vantage (community weekly)
- Warner Center News (community weekly)

=== Magazines ===
- The Advocate
- Angeleno
- Bel-Air View
- Brentwood Magazine
- Brentwood News
- Discover Hollywood Magazine
- Entertainment Weekly
- The Hollywood Reporter
- The Reader Magazine
- L.A. Record
- Los Angeles
- Los Angeles Confidential
- Pacific Palisades 90272
- Sense
- Time Out Los Angeles
- Variety

=== Defunct ===
- El Clamor Público ("The Public Outcry", Spanish, 1855–1859)
- La Crónica (Spanish, c.1872–1889)
- Eastside Sun (community weekly)
- Illustrated Daily News
- LA Youth
- Los Angeles CityBeat
- Los Angeles Daily News (c.1860–1872, not to be confused with either the 1923–1954 Daily News or the current Daily News)
- Los Angeles Daily News (1923-1954, orig. Illustrated Daily News)
- Los Angeles Evening Telegram (c.1882–1882)
- Los Angeles Herald-Examiner (1963 – November 2, 1989)
  - Los Angeles Herald-Express (1931–1962)
    - Los Angeles Herald (1873–1931)
    - Los Angeles Express (1871–1931)
  - Los Angeles Examiner (1903–1962)
- Los Angeles Post-Record (1933–c.1936)
  - Los Angeles Evening Record (1895–1933)
- Los Angeles Star / Estrella de Los Ángeles (English and Spanish, 1851–1879)
- Mexican American Sun (community weekly)
- New Times LA
- Northeast Sun (community weekly)
- Tuesday's Child
- Daily Variety
- Wyvernwood Chronicle (community weekly)

== Television ==
The Los Angeles area is the home of several major offices and production facilities in the television industry. The Fox Broadcasting Company is based in the Century City district of Los Angeles inside the 20th Century Studios studio lot, while the Fox Television Center is in West Los Angeles. CBS owns CBS Studio Center in Studio City and previously owned Television City in the Fairfax District, although the network still maintains operations on that lot. ABC and parent company Disney produce programs at the Walt Disney Studios in Burbank and The Prospect Studios in the Los Feliz neighborhood. NBC primarily produced shows at what is now The Burbank Studios before parent NBCUniversal moved their operations to a complex adjacent to the Universal Studios lot. Several other film studios may also produce TV shows on their respective lots.

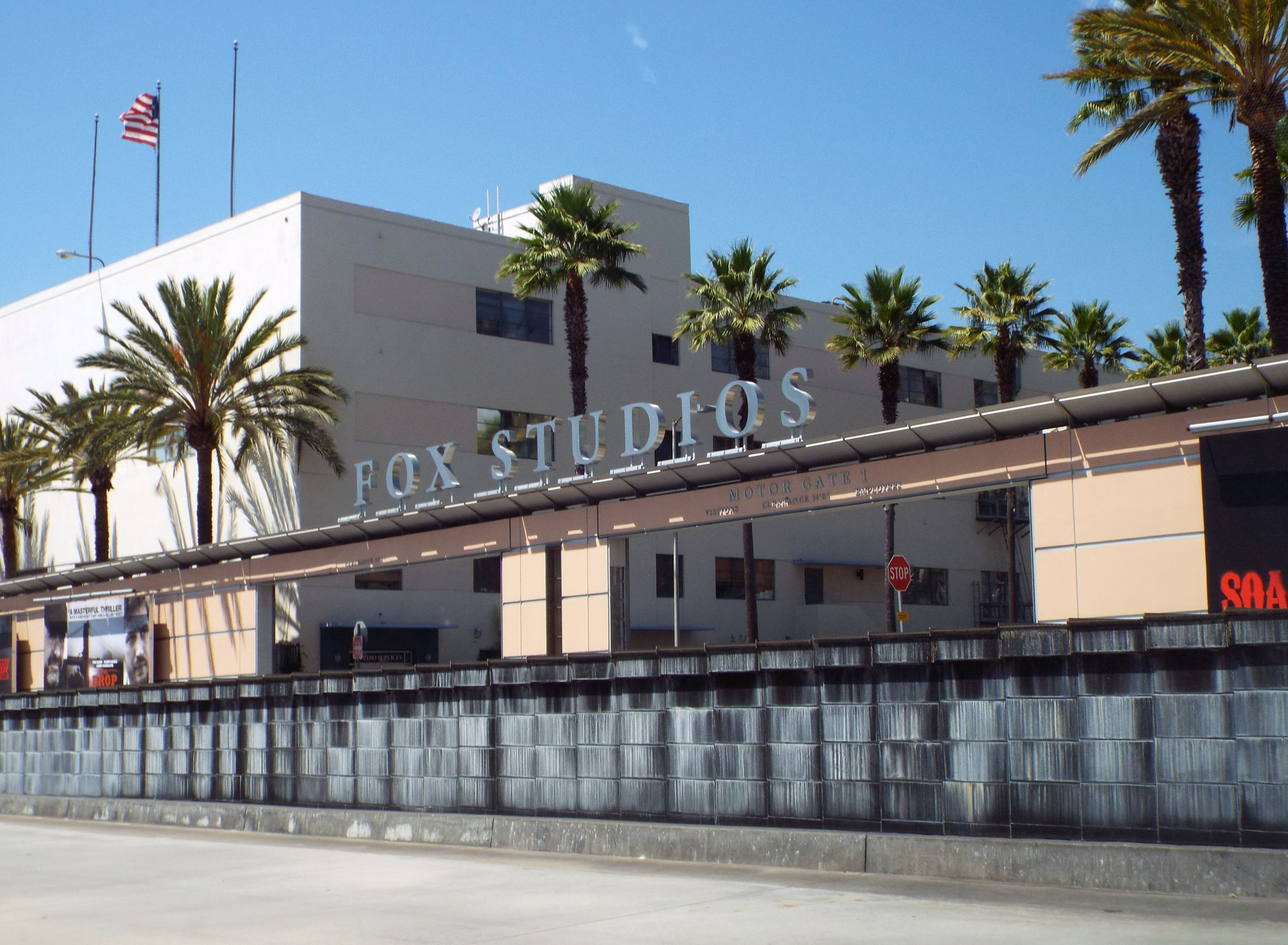
Entrance to the Fox Studio Lot

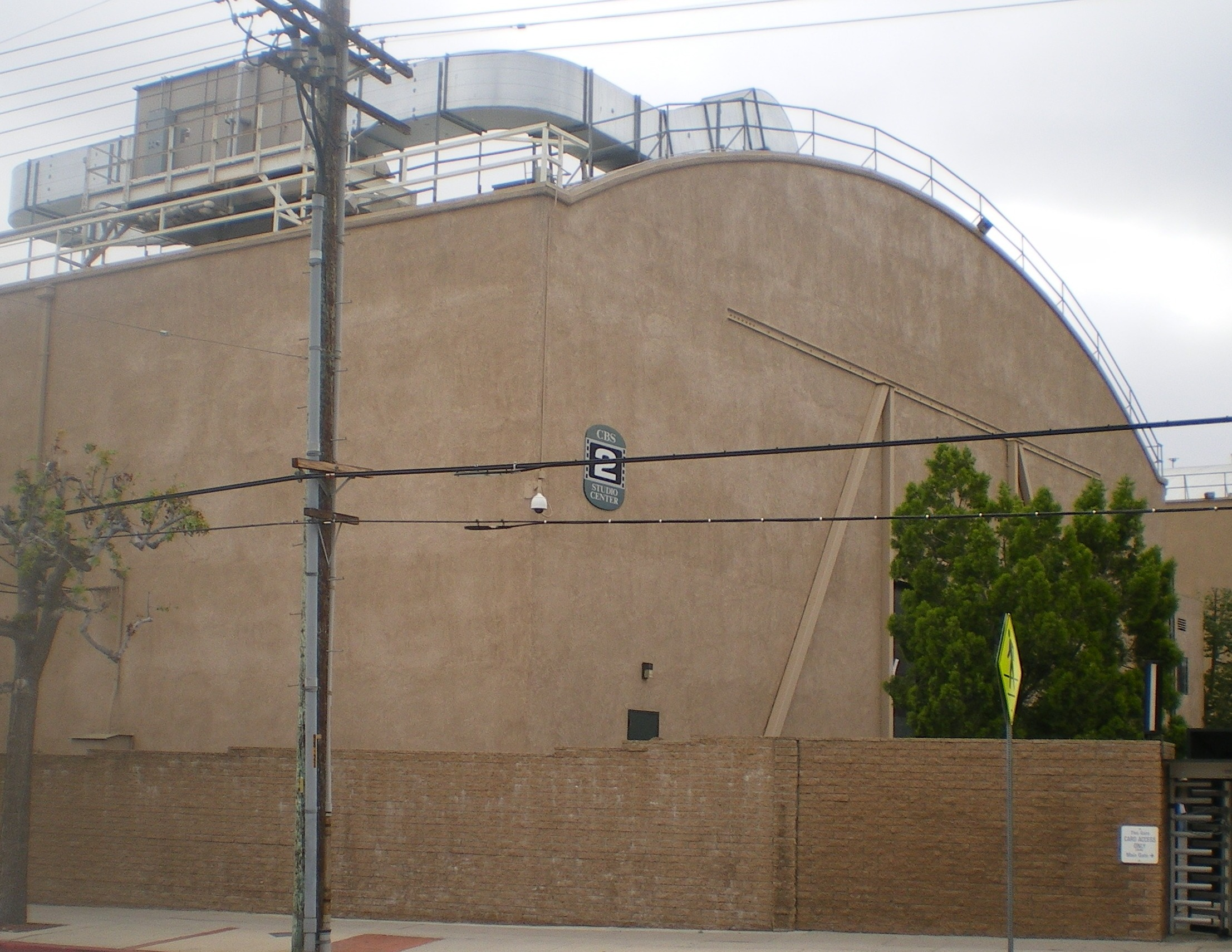
CBS Studio Center, Soundstage 2

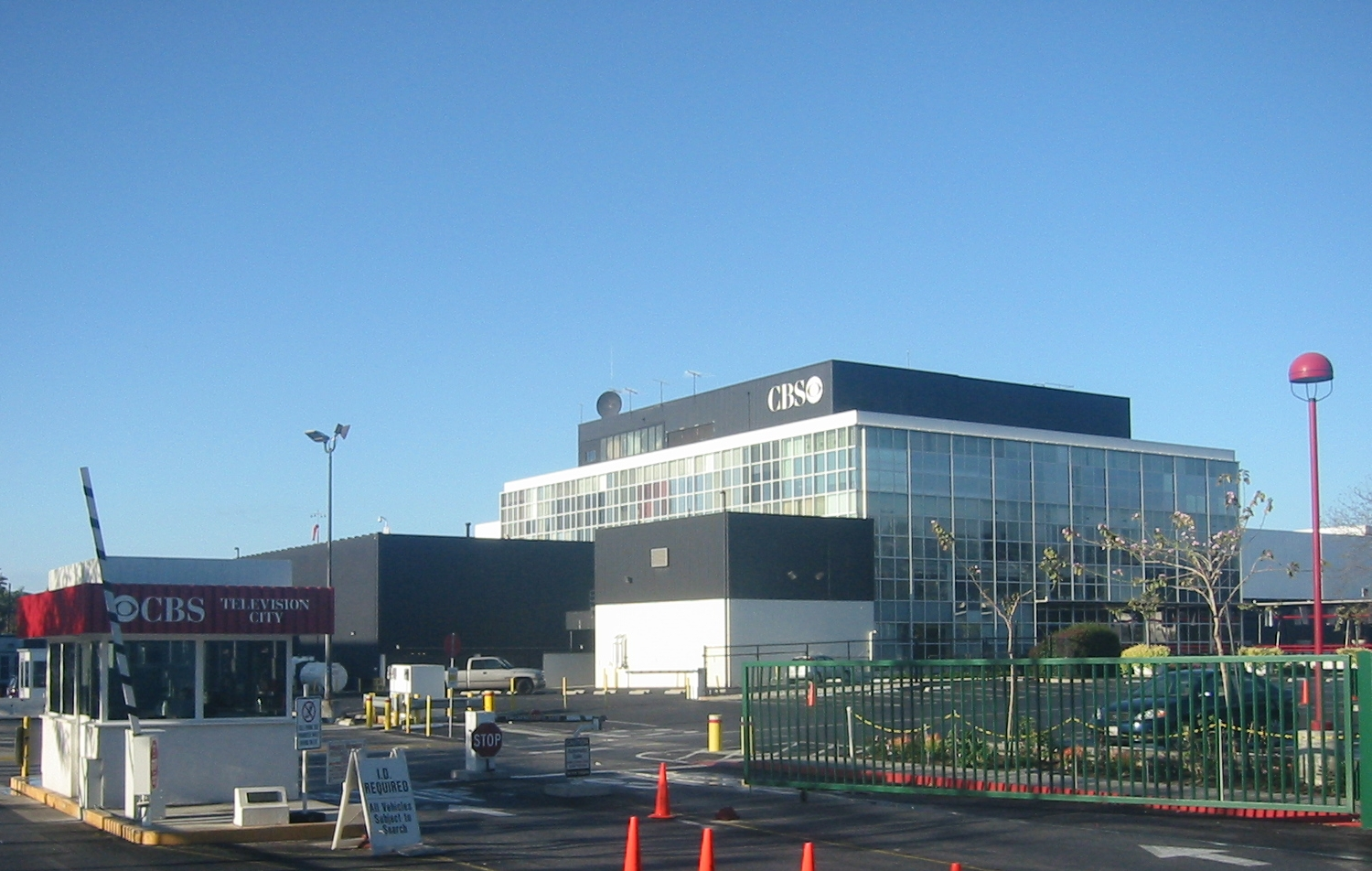
Television City

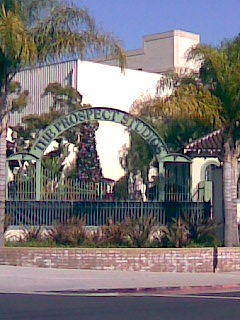
The Prospect Studios, formerly the ABC Television Center

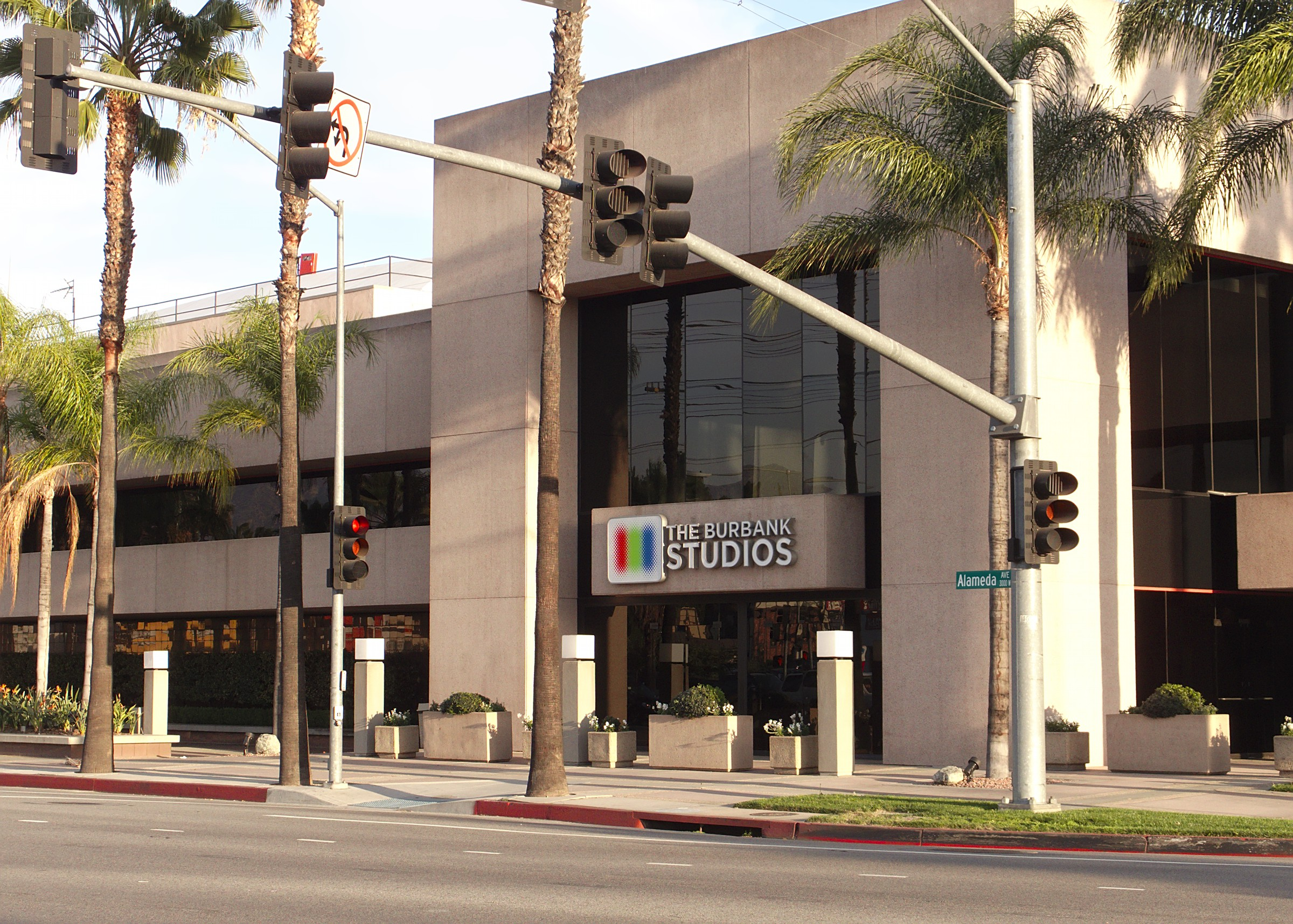
The Burbank Studios, formerly NBC Studios

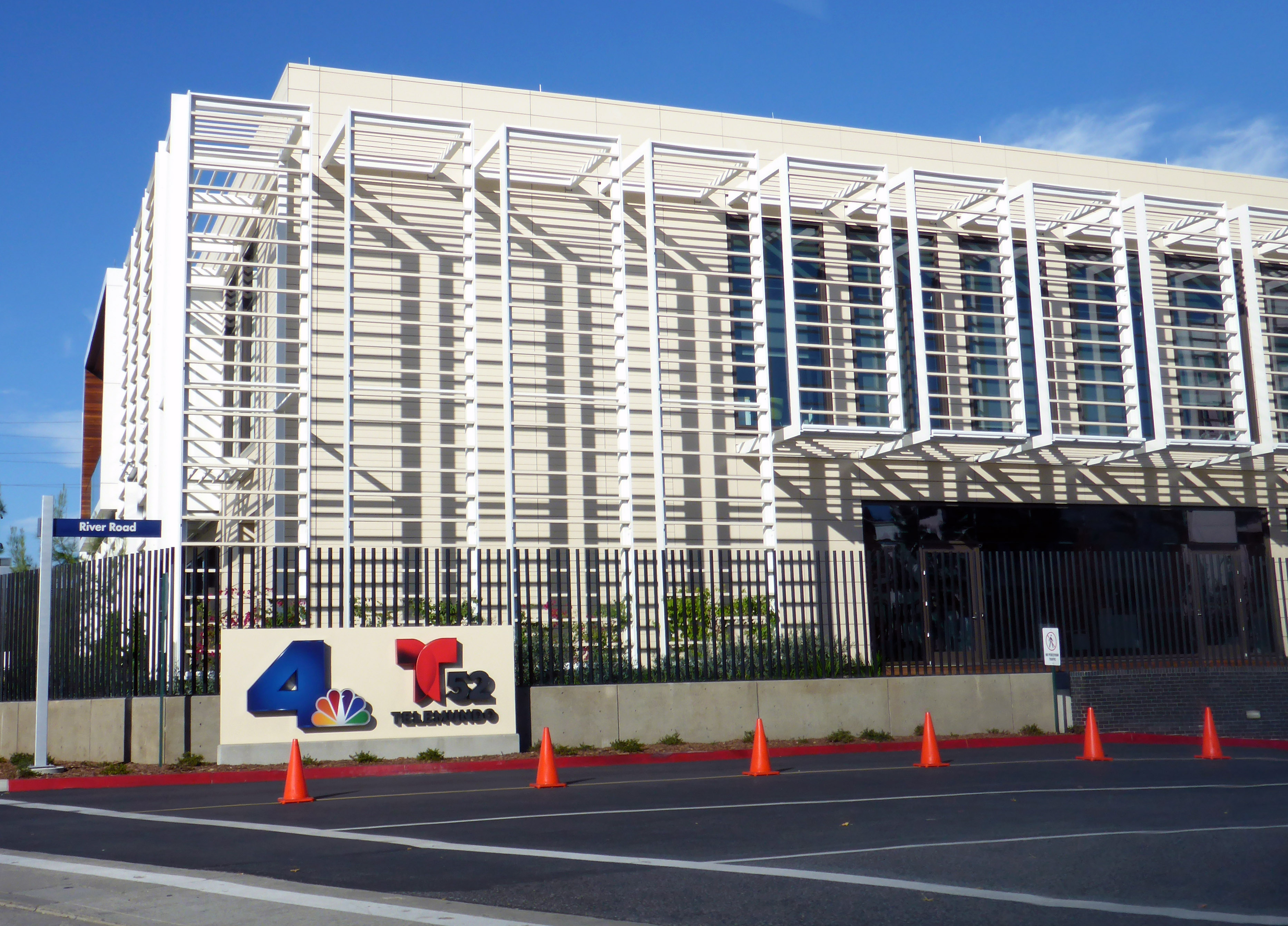
Entrance to Gate 3 at Universal Studios, with signage for KNBC and KVEA

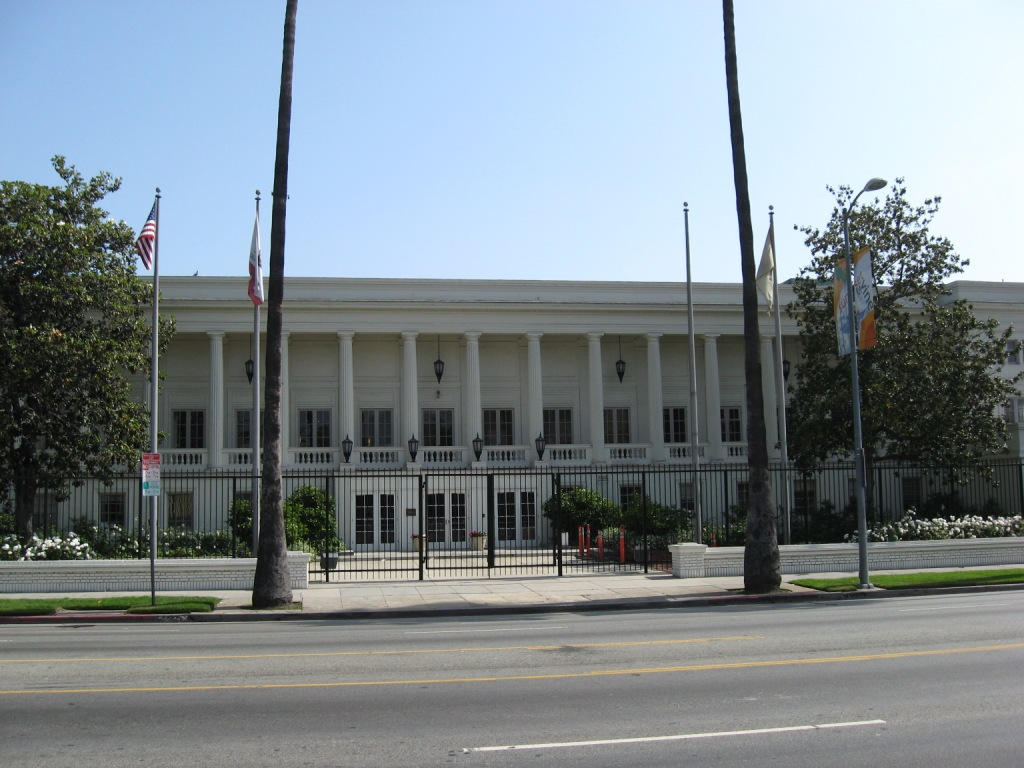
Sunset Bronson Studios, home of KTLA

== Broadcast radio ==
A number of radio stations are broadcast from and/or are licensed to Los Angeles, including the following:

=== AM stations ===
- 570 KLAC Los Angeles (Sports)
- 640 KFI Los Angeles (Talk)^{1}
- 670 KIRN Simi Valley (Iranian/ethnic)
- 710 KSPN Los Angeles (Sports)
- 740 KBRT Costa Mesa (Christian)
- 790 KABC Los Angeles (Conservative talk)
- 830 KLAA Orange (Sports)
- 870 KRLA Glendale (Conservative talk)
- 900 KALI West Covina (Christian)
- 930 KHJ Los Angeles (Relevant Radio)
- 980 KFWB Los Angeles (Regional Mexican)
- 1020 KTNQ Los Angeles (Spanish AC/classic regional Mexican)
- 1070 KNX Los Angeles (All-news)^{1}
- 1110 KWVE Pasadena (Christian preaching)
- 1150 KEIB Los Angeles (Conservative talk)
- 1190 KGBN Anaheim (Korean Christian)
- 1230 KYPA Los Angeles (Korean)
- 1260 KMZT Beverly Hills (Classical)
- 1280 KFRN Long Beach (Family Radio)*
- 1300 KAZN Pasadena (Mandarin Chinese)
- 1330 KWKW Los Angeles (Spanish sports)
- 1390 KLTX Long Beach (Spanish religious)
- 1430 KMRB San Gabriel (Cantonese)
- 1460 KTYM Inglewood (ESNE Radio)
- 1480 KVNR Santa Ana (Vietnamese)
- 1510 KSPA Ontario (Punjabi)
- 1540 KMPC Los Angeles (Korean)
- 1580 KBLA Santa Monica (Progressive talk)
- 1650 KFOX Torrance (Korean)

^{1} clear-channel station

=== FM stations ===
Asterisk (*) indicates a non-commercial or the RDS is called "No text" (public radio/campus/educational) broadcast.

- 87.7 KZNO-LD Big Bear Lake (Spanish religious)
- 88.1 KKJZ Long Beach (Jazz)*
- 88.5 KCSN Northridge (College/AAA)*
- 88.9 KXLU Los Angeles (College/freeform)*
- 89.3 KPCC Pasadena (NPR/talk)*
- 89.7 KSGN Riverside (Christian)
- 89.9 KCRW Santa Monica (NPR/talk/eclectic)*
- 90.3 KMRO Camarillo (Radio Nueva Vida)*
- 90.7 KPFK Los Angeles (Pacifica Radio)*
- 91.5 KUSC Los Angeles (Classical)*
- 92.3 KRRL Los Angeles (Urban contemporary)
- 92.7 KYLA Fountain Valley (Radio Nueva Vida)*
- 93.1 KCBS-FM Los Angeles (Adult hits)
- 93.5 KDAY Redondo Beach (Classic hip hop)
- 93.9 KLLI Los Angeles (Bilingual Latin trap)
- 94.3 KBUA San Fernando (Regional Mexican; KBUE simulcast)
- 94.3 KEBN Garden Grove (Regional Mexican; KBUE simulcast)
- 94.7 KTWV Los Angeles (Urban AC)
- 95.5 KLOS Los Angeles (Classic rock)
- 95.9 KAIA-FM La Mirada (Air1)*
- 96.3 KXOL-FM Los Angeles (Spanish contemporary)
- 96.7 KWIZ Santa Ana (Spanish-language Christian)
- 97.1 KNX-FM Los Angeles (All-news)
- 97.5 KLYY Riverside (Spanish adult hits)
- 97.9 KLAX-FM East Los Angeles (Regional Mexican)
- 98.3 KRCV West Covina (Spanish classic hits)
- 98.7 KYSR Los Angeles (Alternative rock)
- 99.5 KKLA-FM Los Angeles (Christian)
- 100.3 KKLQ Los Angeles (K-Love)*
- 101.1 KRTH Los Angeles (Classic hits)
- 101.9 KSCA Glendale (Regional Mexican)
- 102.3 KJLH Compton (Urban AC)
- 102.7 KIIS-FM Los Angeles (Contemporary hit radio)
- 103.1 KDLD Santa Monica (Regional Mexican)
- 103.5 KOST Los Angeles (Adult contemporary)
- 103.9 KRCD Inglewood (Spanish classic hits)
- 104.3 KBIG Los Angeles (Hot AC)
- 104.7 KOCP Camarillo (Rhythmic oldies)
- 105.1 KKGO-FM Los Angeles (Country)
- 105.5 KBUE Long Beach (Regional Mexican)
- 105.9 KPWR Los Angeles (Rhythmic contemporary)
- 106.7 KROQ-FM Pasadena (Alternative rock)
- 107.1 KSSE Arcadia (Spanish adult hits)
- 107.5 KLVE Los Angeles (Latin pop)

== See also ==
- Culture of Los Angeles
- Arts and culture of Los Angeles
- History of Los Angeles, California
- Media in the United States
