= Standard General =

American hedge fund

Standard General L.P.
- Type: Hedge fund
- Founded: 2007; 19 years ago
- Headquarters: New York City, US
- Key people: Soo Kim (Managing Partner & Chief Investment Officer)
- Owner: Acme Amalgamated Holdings, LLC
- Parent: Standard General Management LLC
- Subsidiaries: Standard Media
- Website: standardgenerallp.com

Standard General L.P. is an American hedge fund headquartered in New York City. It was founded in 2007 by Soohyung "Soo" Kim and Nicholas Singer with seed capital from Reservoir Capital Group. Since 2013, Soo Kim has been the Managing Partner and Chief Investment Officer. Kim was named "American Executive of the Year" at the 2021 Global Gaming Awards.

Standard General L. P. is controlled by Standard General Management LLC which is controlled by Acme Amalgamated Holdings, LLC, which is ultimately controlled by Soohyung Kim.

Standard General was active in managing the bankruptcies of Aliante Casino and Hotel, American Apparel, Greektown, RadioShack and Young Broadcasting.

As reported in the 2019 10K, Standard General L.P. is the largest shareholder of Bally's Corporation, and as of December 2025, the company was considered as a potential buyer of Warner Bros Discovery's cable and linear network assets.

== Investment strategies ==
Standard General pursues a single strategy of opportunistic investing primarily in levered U.S. middle-market companies. The firm has the ability to invest across the capital structure but is better known for specializing in distressed debt. Since 2007, it has invested in both publicly traded and private entities and is known for making several control investments.

== Bally's ==
Standard General L.P. is the largest shareholder of Bally's Corporation, formerly known as Twin River Worldwide Holdings. Soo Kim, Standard General's managing partner had been an independent director of the company since 2016 and was elected chairman of the board of directors in late 2019. Kim oversaw a major expansion of its operations, including a reverse merger with Dover Downs Gaming & Entertainment to take Twin River public, and various casino acquisitions in 2020. It also acquired rights to the Bally's brand from Caesars Entertainment and adopted it as its corporate name, with an intent to unify all of its properties under the brand. The company also made moves to expand its focus on sports betting, including acquisitions in the field, and a partnership with Sinclair Broadcast Group and Entertainment Studios to rebrand its regional sports networks under the Bally name as part of a promotion and content agreement.

In January 2022, Standard General offered to buy all outstanding shares in Bally's Corporation that it did not already own, valuing it at $2.07 billion.

== MediaCo ==
MediaCo Holding Inc., “MediaCo” or the “Company”) is a multi-media company formed in Indiana in 2019, focused on television, radio and digital advertising, premium programming and events. On April 17, 2024, MediaCo entered into an asset purchase agreement with Estrella Broadcasting, Inc., and SLF LBI Aggregator, LLC, and affiliate of HPS Investment Partners, LLC, pursuant to which Purchaser purchased substantially all of the assets of Estrella and its subsidiaries (other than certain broadcast assets owned by Estrella and its subsidiaries, and assumed substantially all of the liabilities of Estrella and its subsidiaries.

The company's assets consist of two radio stations located in New York City, WQHT(FM) and WBLS(FM), which serve the New York City demographic market area and primarily target Black, Hispanic, and multi-cultural consumers, and as a result of the Estrella Acquisition, Estrella's network, content, digital, and commercial operations, including network affiliation and program supply agreements with Estrella for its 11 radio stations serving Los Angeles, CA, Houston, TX, and Dallas, TX and nine television stations serving Los Angeles, CA, Houston, TX, Denver, CO, and Miami, FL. Among the Estrella brands that joined MediaCo are the EstrellaTV network, its influential linear and digital video content business, Estrella's expansive digital channels, including its four FAST channels - EstrellaTV, Estrella News, Cine EstrellaTV - and Estrella Games, and the EstrellaTV app.

As reported in the 2023 10K, Standard General is the largest shareholder in MediaCo Holding, Inc.

Stations currently owned by MediaCo Holding
Media market	State	Station	Branding
Los Angeles	California	KBUA	Qué Buena 94.3 FM
Los Angeles	California	KBUE	Qué Buena 105.5 FM
Los Angeles	California	KEBN	Qué Buena 94.3 FM
Los Angeles	California	KRCA	Estrella TV
Los Angeles	California	KVNR	Little Saigon Radio 1480AM
Riverside	California	KRQB	Qué Buena 96.1 FM
Denver	Colorado	KETD	Estrella TV
Chicago	Illinois	WESV-LD	Estrella TV
New York City	New York	WMBC-TV	Estrella TV
New York City	New York	WQHT	Hot 97.1 FM
New York City	New York	WBLS	WBLS 107.5 FM
New York City	New York	WQHT-HD2	La Buena 97.1 HD2 FM
New York City	New York	WBLS-HD2	Luna 107.5 HD2 FM
Beaumont–Port Arthur	Texas	KQQK	El Norte 107.9 FM
Beaumont–Port Arthur	Texas	KTJM	La Raza 98.5 FM
Dallas–Fort Worth	Texas	KNOR	La Raza 93.7 FM
Dallas–Fort Worth	Texas	KBOC	Luna 98.3 FM
Dallas–Fort Worth	Texas	KZZA	La Ranchera 106.7 FM
Houston	Texas	KEYH	Houston Radio Platinum 850AM
Houston	Texas	KNTE	La Raza 101.7 FM
Houston	Texas	KZJL	Estrella TV

== Standard Media ==
In April 2018, the divestiture of stations by Sinclair Broadcasting during the Tribune Media buyout opened an opportunity for Standard Media, subsidiary of Standard General, to purchase several of the stations. In the case of the stations in the Wilkes Barre, PA market, Sinclair is not the licensee of these stations and will only be selling the assets of such stations that Sinclair owns, together with its right to purchase the licenses of the stations. The deal fell through when the Sinclair-Tribune merger was terminated on August 9, 2018.

The stations that were to be purchased by Standard Media included:

Standard Media TV Stations
Call Sign	Current owner	Affiliate	Media Market
WXMI	E. W. Scripps Company	Fox	Grand Rapids, Michigan
WPMT	Nexstar Media Group	Fox	Harrisburg, Pennsylvania
WXLV-TV	Sinclair	ABC	Greensboro, North Carolina
WRLH-TV	Sinclair	Fox	Richmond, Virginia
WOLF-TV	Sinclair	Fox	Wilkes-Barre, Pennsylvania
WQMY	Sinclair	MNT	Wilkes Barre, Pennsylvania
WSWB	Sinclair	CW	Wilkes Barre, Pennsylvania
KDSM-TV	Sinclair	Fox	Des Moines, Iowa
KOKH-TV	Sinclair	Fox	Oklahoma City

== History ==
=== Media General ===
Standard General became the majority owner of Young Broadcasting after its emergence from chapter 11 bankruptcy in 2010. Young Broadcasting later merged with Media General in November 2013. Following that merger, the combined Media General went on to merge with LIN Media, a transaction that would create the nation's eighth largest television station group. On January 27, 2016, Media General was sold to Nexstar Broadcasting Group. Standard General profited $300 million USD from the transaction. In recognition of this series of shareholder value-creating transactions, in May 2016, Gabelli Funds inducted Media General board member Soohyung Kim into the GAMCO Management Hall of Fame.

=== Aliante Casino and Hotel ===
Aliante Casino and Hotel was developed by Station Casinos and the family-owned Greenspun Corp. In connection with Station's bankruptcy proceedings, lenders took control of Aliante in 2011. From 2011 to 2016, Standard General was the largest stakeholder of ALST Casino Holdco, the owner of the Aliante Casino and Hotel in North Las Vegas. Soohyung Kim served as the CEO of ALST Casino Holdco. In April 2016, Boyd Gaming agreed to purchase the ALST Casino Holdco LLC for total net cash consideration of $380 million.

=== RadioShack ===
In 2015, The New York Times described the firm as "the little-known hedge fund that is also leading the turnaround at RadioShack." In 2015, during RadioShack's Chapter 11 bankruptcy, Standard General formed General Wireless (although unrelated, General Wireless was the original name for Metro by T-Mobile), to act as the owner and operator of the RadioShack brand and its assets. The new company partnered with Sprint to create co-branded stores, with Sprint's name eventually becoming the primary brand on the exterior and selling both Sprint and RadioShack-branded products and services within. General Wireless filed for Chapter 11 bankruptcy on March 8, 2017, taking the RadioShack name through its second bankruptcy in two years. On June 12, 2017, General Wireless announced its intent to auction off the RadioShack name. In late July 2018, RadioShack partnered up with HobbyTown USA to open up around 100 RadioShack "Express" stores. In 2020, the assets were bought by Miami-based Retail Ecommerce Ventures.

=== Tegna and Cox Media Group ===
On February 22, 2022, Tegna Inc. announced that it had agreed to be taken private by a group led by Standard General and Apollo Global Management for $24 per-share, valuing the company at $5.4 billion. The company, would retain the Tegna name, be controlled by an affiliate of Standard General, with Standard Media CEO Deb McDermott (who previously led Young Broadcasting and Media General) becoming CEO. Affiliates of AGM, as well as Cox Media Group (which is principally owned by AGM, with Cox Enterprises as a minority shareholder) and other investors, would have held non-voting shares in the company. Tegna's digital advertising subsidiary Premion would be held as a standalone business between Standard and CMG. The sale included a clause that would have slowly increase the value that Standard and Apollo would pay per-share if the sale took longer than nine months to close.

The sale would have also resulted in the realignment of station holdings presently associated with both companies: Standard Media's four stations WDKA, WLNE-TV, KBSI, and KLKN would be sold to Cox Media Group, which would then divest its Boston station WFXT to Tegna and Standard General, and acquire WFAA/KMPX, KHOU/KTBU, and KVUE, from Tegna. In order to comply with FCC regulations, some stations would have been sold to other companies in six markets where both groups already owned stations (Atlanta, Charlotte, Jacksonville, Memphis, Seattle, and Spokane).

On March 30, 2022, Cox Media Group announced that it would sell 18 stations, namely KLAX in Alexandria, WICZ in Binghamton, KIEM and KVIQ-LD in Eureka, WABG, WNBD and WXVT in Greenwood, KPVI in Idaho Falls, KMVU and KFBI-LD in Medford, WHBQ in Memphis, KAYU in Spokane, WSYT in Syracuse, KOKI and KMYT in Tulsa, KCYU-LD and KFFX in Yakima and KYMA in Yuma to Imagicomm Communications—a shell company affiliated with the cable network INSP—for an undisclosed amount.

The sale was approved by Standard General and Apollo Global Management on May 17, 2022. The sale was completed on August 1, 2022.

On October 6, 2022, the Chair of the House Energy and Commerce Committee Frank Pallone and Speaker of the House Nancy Pelosi issued a letter to the FCC expressing concerns for the transaction, arguing that it "would violate the FCC's mandate by restricting access to local news coverage, cutting jobs at local television stations, and raising prices on consumers." They specifically cited statements by Standard General regarding plans for a Washington, D.C. bureau to produce content for local newscasts, and arguing that Tegna's stations had "too many employees". Standard General responded to the letter, denying that they planned to cut jobs or hub content, and promoting that Tegna would become the largest female-run and minority-owned broadcaster in the United States. They also responded to objections by NewsGuild-CWA describing Standard General as "backed by anonymous investors located in the Cayman Islands", stating that the entirety of its board is represented by U.S. interests.

On February 24, 2023, it was confirmed that FCC staff referred the deal to an administrative law judge, which the FCC Commissioner's Board voted to remand the merger review toward on May 22. The deal was terminated on May 22, 2023.

== Awards ==
In 2016 Standard General L.P. was the recipient of the New York City Comptroller's Office Diverse Practitioner Award.
