= Inmigrante TV =

American television network

- Type: Broadcast digital television network
- Availability: Nationwide, though not in every market
- Motto: Noticias – Inmigración – La Reforma
- Key people: Manuel Solis; Roberto Repreza, Marina Gil, Carolina Sanford, Juan Ignacio Rosales, Dagoberto Urbina, Diana Briceño, Carlos Cesteros.
- Launch date: February 19, 2010; 15 years ago
- Official website: www.inmigrantetv.com blog.inmigrantetv.com

Inmigrante TV is an American television network featuring political news and commentary aimed at Hispanic immigrants.

The station was founded in 2010 by immigration attorney Manuel Solis. Much of the programming consists of advertising for Solis' law firm.

It was broadcast on the following digital subchannels:

- KAZD 55.3 Dallas – Azteca (Una Vez Mas Holdings, LLC)
- KGBT 4.3 Harlingen, Texas – CBS (Sinclair Broadcast Group)
- KMPX 29.2 Dallas – Estrella TV (Liberman Broadcasting)
- KRCA 62.4 Los Angeles – Estrella TV (Liberman Broadcasting)
- KTAZ 39.2 Phoenix – Telemundo (NBC Universal)
- KTDO 47.3 El Paso – Telemundo (ZGS Communications)
- KZJL 61.2 Houston – Estrella TV (Liberman Broadcasting)
- WESV-LD 40.2 Chicago – Independent
