= List of Estrella TV affiliates =

The following is a list of affiliates for Estrella TV, a Spanish language television network owned by MediaCo.

== Affiliates ==
List of Estrella TV affiliates
Media market	State	Station	Channel	Year affiliated	Notes
Tucson	Arizona	KTTU	18.2	2009	
Yuma	Arizona	KYMA-DT	13.3	2020	
Bakersfield	California	KCBT-LD	34.1	2016	
Fresno	California	KGMC	43.1	2016	
Los Angeles	California	KRCA	62	2009	
Sacramento	California	KQCA	58.3	2015	
Salinas	California	KSBW	8.3	2016	
San Francisco	California	KOFY-TV	20.1	2026	
San Luis Obispo	California	KTAS	33.1	2025	
Denver	Colorado	KETD	53	2009	
Fort Myers–Naples	Florida	WXCW	46.2	2016	
Miami–Fort Lauderdale	Florida	WGEN-TV	8	2018	
Orlando	Florida	WDYB-CD	14	2026	
Tampa	Florida	WMOR-TV	32.3	2009	
West Palm Beach	Florida	WPBF-TV	25.2	2009	
Atlanta	Georgia	WANN-CD	32.10	2014	
Boise	Idaho	KKIC-LD	16.1	2013	
Hammond	Indiana	WJYS	40.1	2026	
Bowling Green	Kentucky	WDNZ-LD	12.1	2019	
Las Vegas	Nevada	KVCW	33.3	2025	
Albuquerque	New Mexico	KOAT-TV	7.2	2009	
New York City	New York	WMBC-TV	63.1	2025	
Charlotte	North Carolina	WCEE-LD	16.1	2014	
Raleigh–Durham	North Carolina	WIRP-LD	27.1	2014	
Raleigh–Durham	North Carolina	WNCB-LD	16.1	2014	
Oklahoma City	Oklahoma	KOCY-LD	48.1	2012	
Oklahoma City	Oklahoma	KTUZ	48.1	2012	
Tulsa	Oklahoma	KXAP-LD	14.1	2010	
Philadelphia	Pennsylvania	WTVE	51.2	2013	
Amarillo	Texas	KLKW-LD	22.1	2014	
Austin	Texas	KVUE	24.2	2009	
Dallas–Fort Worth	Texas	KTXD-TV	47.1	2026	
El Paso	Texas	KTSM-TV	9.2	2009	
Houston	Texas	KZJL	61	2009	
Lubbock	Texas	KNKC-LD	29.1	2014	
Odessa–Midland	Texas	KPEJ-TV	24.2	2009	
San Antonio	Texas	KYVV-TV	10.1	2026	
Waco–Temple	Texas	KYLE-TV	28.3	2009	
Waco–Temple	Texas	KWKT-TV	44.3	2009	
Yakima	Washington	KWYT-LD	36.1	2010	

=== Former affiliates ===
Media market	State	Station	Channel	Years affiliated	Notes
Little Rock	Arkansas	KKYK-CD	30.4	2014	
Chico	California	KBIT-LD	50.2	2014–2018	
Concord	California	KTNC-TV	42.1	2009–2016	
Fort Bragg	California	KUNO-TV	8.1	2009–2010	
Monterey	California	KMBY-LD	19.2	2010	
Palm Springs	California	KRET-CD	45.2	2010	
San Diego	California	KSDX-LD	9.4	2009–2023	
San Francisco	California	KCNS	38.4	2016–2021	
San Francisco	California	KEMO-TV	50.1	2021–2024	
Santa Barbara	California	KSBT-LD	32.2	2010	
Miami	Florida	WSVN	7.2	2009–2017	
Orlando	Florida	WKCF	18.3	2009–2026	
Wichita	Kansas	KCTU-LD	5.2	2009–2019	
St. Louis	Missouri	KBGU-LP	33.2	2015	
Omaha	Nebraska	KPTM	42.3	2010–2015	
Las Vegas	Nevada	KVMY	21.2	2009–2014	
Las Vegas	Nevada	KSNV	3.2	2015–2025	
Reno	Nevada	KNRC-LD	14.1	2010–202?	
Roswell	New Mexico	KOCT-TV	6.2	2009	
Silver City	New Mexico	KOVT-TV	10.2	2009	
New York City	New York	WPIX	11.4	2009–2012	
New York City	New York	WASA-LD	24.1	2012–2026	
Greensboro–Winston-Salem	North Carolina	WCWG	20.3	2009–2015	
Wilmington	North Carolina	WADA-LD	18.1	2014–2015	
Cleveland	Ohio	WQDI-LD	20.1	2016–202?	
Brownsville	Texas	KVEO-TV	23.2	2009–2020	
Brownsville	Texas	KGBT-TV	4.4	2020–2026	
Dallas–Fort Worth	Texas	KMPX/KFAA-TV	29.1/.2	2009–2024 (on DT1), 2024–2026 (on DT2)	
Jacksonville–Tyler–Longview	Texas	KETK-TV	56.2	2011	
Salt Lake City	Utah	KPNZ	24	2009–2018	
Bellingham	Washington	KBCB	24.2	2011–2014	
