= Los Angeles Daily News (disambiguation) =

Los Angeles Daily News is the title of a number of various publications independent of each other.

== Media ==
- Los Angeles Daily News (19th century), founded 1869 and published by Los Angeles-based King & Offutt. The date for the cessation of the publication is not known
- Los Angeles Daily News (1923-1954), founded in 1923 as Los Angeles Illustrated Daily News
- Los Angeles Daily News (1911-present), published as the Van Nuys Call and now known as the Los Angeles Daily News, the second widest daily newspaper in LA after the Los Angeles Times
