= KWIE =

KWIE may refer to:

- KWIE (FM), a radio station (101.3 FM) licensed to Barstow, California, United States
- KRQB (FM), a radio station (96.1 FM) licensed to San Jacinto, California, United States, which used the call sign KWIE from April 2004 to August 2007
- KDAY, a radio station (93.5 FM) licensed to Redondo Beach, California, United States, which formerly used the call sign KWIE
