= MediaCo =

American media company

MediaCo Holding Inc.
- Formerly: Liberman Broadcasting, Inc. (1987–2019); LBI Media, Inc. (2019–2020; used previously as trade name for broadcasting subsidiary); Estrella Media (2020–2025)
- Type: Private
- Industry: Radio and Television Broadcasting
- Founded: 1987
- Founder: José and Lenard Liberman, Miguel Banojian
- Headquarters: Burbank, California, U.S.
- Area served: United States
- Key people: Peter Markham (President/CEO, Estrella Media); Brian Kei (COO/CFO, Estrella Media); Ivan Stoilkovic (Executive Vice President of Television Programming, Estrella Media)
- Owner: HPS Investment Partners, LLC; Standard General
- Subsidiaries: Estrella TV
- Website: mediaco.now

MediaCo Holding Inc. (a.k.a. MediaCo; formerly known as Liberman Broadcasting, Inc. from 1987 to October 14, 2019, LBI Media, Inc. from October 15, 2019 until February 2, 2020, and Estrella Media Co from February 3, 2020 to November 9, 2025) is an American media company with offices based in Burbank, California and New York City, owned by private equity firms HPS Investment Partners, LLC and Standard General. MediaCo caters to the African-American and the Spanish-speaking Hispanic communities. The company owns television and radio stations in several of the top multicultural markets, and is the parent company of the Estrella TV network.

Prior to the Estrella Media acquisition, MediaCo Holding Inc. originally formed in Indiana in 2019 on the heels of Emmis Communications selling WBLS and WQHT.

== History ==
=== Beginnings as Liberman Broadcasting ===
José Liberman, and his son Lenard founded the company in 1987, as Liberman Broadcasting, Inc.. Between them, they had more than 55 years of operating experience in the broadcasting industry. The father/son pair co-founded radio and television clusters in Los Angeles and Houston, and in the late 1990s to early 2000s, expanded their assets to include broadcast properties in Dallas and San Diego. Although their television stations were considered part of the Liberman Television Network, they were still classified as independent stations and by 2006, the company had adopted a consistent branding for its three television stations under the brand "Estrella TV" (or "Star TV"), mirroring the television system model in the Canadian television industry. Liberman expanded the Estrella TV format to other markets where it acquired television stations, featuring much of the same programs as those aired by the Los Angeles, Dallas and Houston outlets (some of which aired in different timeslots than they did on KRCA, KMPX and KZJL).

In 1999, Liberman formed a production division within its LBI Media unit to produce original programming content that would be distributed to the stations, focusing on a mix of variety series, sketch comedy, scripted drama and music programs, talk shows and game shows. One of its earliest programs, the reality game show Gana la Verde ("Win the Green"), caused controversy after several immigrant advocacy groups (including the American Immigration Lawyers Association, the Central American Resource Center, the Latina Lawyers Bar Association and the Mexican American Bar Association) and California U.S. House Reps. Xavier Becerra, Hilda Solis and Linda Sánchez complained that the format – which debuted in July 2004, and featured illegal immigrants competing in extreme Fear Factor-style competitions for the opportunity to win one year of legal assistance from an immigration attorney to help them obtain a green card – put its participants in danger of deportation by immigration authorities aware of the show.

=== Growth and Expansion ===
Former logo as Liberman Broadcasting, used from 2001 to October 14, 2019; logo continues to appear in LBI-produced content originally broadcast under the former Liberman banner.

On August 4, 2006, Liberman Broadcasting reached an agreement with Entravision Communications to buy the company's five Dallas-area radio stations. On May 30, 2007, Liberman Broadcasting announced that it would expand into Utah through its purchase of KPNZ (channel 24) in Salt Lake City from Utah Communications, LLC for $10 million (although it would continue to operate as an English language independent station from after the purchase was finalized that November until February 2008); then on July 19, 2007, Liberman bought KWIE (now KRQB and at the time maintaining a Rhythmic CHR format) in the Los Angeles suburb of Riverside, California from Magic Broadcasting for $25 million. On August 18, 2008, the company purchased low-power station KVPA-LP (channel 42) in Phoenix, Arizona from Latin America Broadcasting, Inc. for $1.25 million.

=== Launch of Estrella TV ===
On January 27, 2009, at the National Association of Television Program Executives (NATPE) Convention in Las Vegas, Liberman Broadcasting announced that it would turn the Estrella TV concept into a full-fledged national network that would launch at a then-yet-determined date later that year, which would be targeted at adults between the ages of 18 and 49 years old. Liberman had explored the possibility of developing a national network in 2007, when it raised $200 million in capital to acquire additional television stations and expand programming production. The network was originally scheduled to launch on July 1, though its debut was subsequently delayed to September 14, 2009.

On February 3, 2010, LeSea Broadcasting announced the sale of KWHD to Liberman for $5.75 million; the station became an Estrella TV owned-and-operated station following completion of the sale, under the callsign KETD, on June 1. On February 22, 2010, Liberman Broadcasting acquired W40BY (now WESV-LD) Chicago from Trinity Broadcasting Network, intending to convert it to serve as the Estrella TV O&O for the market. The sale was closed on December 6. On January 23, 2012, Liberman Broadcasting announced the sale of KNTE-FM (96.9, now KXBJ) in the Houston suburb of El Campo, Texas to the KSBJ Educational Foundation for $2.1 million; the sale was completed that April. Subsequently, on May 2, Liberman pared back its Houston-area radio cluster further with the sale of KJOJ (880, now KJOZ) in Conroe to Aleluya Christian Broadcasting (a subsidiary of DAIJ Media LLC) for $1 million. On February 11, 2013, Liberman Broadcasting announced the sale of Spanish CHR KTCY (101.7 FM, now KYDA) in the Dallas–Fort Worth suburb of Azle, Texas to the Educational Media Foundation for $6 million.

In September 2016, Liberman Broadcasting was involved in two sexual harassment lawsuits filed with the Los Angeles Superior Court involving two female newscasters. In the initial suit, former Estrella TV anchor/correspondent Adriana Ruggiero (who filed her suit anonymously under the pseudonym "Jane Doe") claimed sexual harassment, wrongful termination and breach of contract, accusing the network's Vice President of News at the time, Andres Angulo, informed her that Lenard Liberman was unconvinced about promoting Ruggiero—who was appointed as main anchor of the early-evening Noticiero Estrella TV newscast in 2015—to permanently replace the then-recently deceased Enrique Gratas as anchor of the prime time news program Cierre de Edicion because she did not look attractive enough, had asked her to showcase her cleavage more on-air (a claim Angulo allegedly stated he would deny asking her if she took the case to court), had repeatedly harassed another female employee, and threatened to replace her with fellow anchor Adriana Yañez (who was hired by the network in October 2015) if Ruggiero insisted on receiving a bonus stipulated in her contract. In retaliation for pursuing the bonus, Ruggiero claimed she was excluded from Cierre de Edicion editorial meetings and "intentionally caused members of the news team to lose respect" for her opinions and abilities. (Ruggiero was replaced as Cierre de Edicion anchor by Pedro Ferriz Hijar, previously with Mexico's Efekto TV network, and was replaced on Noticiero Estrella TV by Yañez in January 2016, resulting in her effective dismissal from the network.)

A separate suit filed on June 23 by Karla Amezola—then anchor at Los Angeles flagship KRCA-TV—cited a history of "shameless and disgusting acts" of harassment by Angulo that "continued to escalate in levels of depravity", stating that he bragged about his sexual experiences and showed her nude photographs of female co-workers he had slept with to Amezola and other Estrella/KRCA colleagues, had propositioned her for sex numerous times (including telling her that he thought of her while masturbating in his office), had kissed her against her will and allegedly stroked his erect penis while asking her to "turn around" to peer at her buttocks while in Angulo's office. Amezola also claimed Angulo threatened her in 2015 against taking any legal action and warned her that human resources would not believe her allegations. After filing a complaint to Estrella/KRCA human resources, Angulo and Estrella TV management retaliated against employees who "contributed damaging information," removing her as 5:00 p.m. anchor at KRCA (while retaining her as 11:00 p.m. anchor) without cause and undertaking measures against employees who came forward as witnesses to Amezola's claims.

Estrella Media logo from February 3, 2020 to November 9, 2025.

=== Reorganization and Rebrand as Estrella Media ===
On November 21, 2018, Liberman Broadcasting filed for Chapter 11 bankruptcy protection with the United States Bankruptcy Court for the District of Delaware. The company—which claimed assets worth between $100 million and $500 million and liabilities worth between $500 million and $1 billion—sought to reduce its overall debt by more than $350 million and secured $38 million in debtor-in-possession financing. On April 17, 2019, Liberman obtained approval of its reorganization plan from the Delaware bankruptcy court, with the expectation that it would be able to clear its balance sheet within the following several months. As a result, Estrella TV suspended production of the talk show Noches con Platanito and cancelled its two morning news programs Primera Edición and Buenos Dias Familia. (The latter two shows—following a four-month run of telenovelas and an encore of the previous weeknight's edition of flagship newscast Cierre de Edicion in the timeslot—would later be replaced by a new morning news program, En la Mañana, on October 21.) On October 15, 2019, Liberman Broadcasting completed its reorganization plan, turning over ownership of the company—which was formally renamed LBI Media, Inc.—to its first lien lender, private equity firm HPS Investment Partners, LLC, which sponsored the reorganization plan; the reorganization eliminated more than $350 million of debt from its balance sheet. As part of the corporate reorganization, co-founder/CEO Lenard Liberman divested his equity in LBI, and was replaced as the company's CEO by former Granite Broadcasting and Communications Corporation of America Chairman Peter Markham. On February 3, 2020, LBI Media rebranded as Estrella Media, borrowing its name from flagship Spanish-language network Estrella TV. On April 18, 2024, MediaCo Holding, announced that it had acquired all of the company's content assets. Estrella Media kept the stations as a result.

=== Merger into MediaCo ===
On April 17, 2024, MediaCo entered into an asset purchase agreement with Estrella Broadcasting, Inc., and SLF LBI Aggregator, LLC, and affiliate of HPS Investment Partners, LLC, pursuant to which Purchaser purchased substantially all of the assets of Estrella and its subsidiaries (other than certain broadcast assets owned by Estrella and its subsidiaries, and assumed substantially all of the liabilities of Estrella and its subsidiaries.

As reported in the 2023 10K, Standard General is the largest shareholder in MediaCo Holding, Inc.

=== Possible acquisition of Warner Bros. Discovery's cable assets by MediaCo's owner ===
On December 17, 2025, MediaCo's owner, Standard General, is interested to buy or invest in Warner Bros. Discovery's cable assets. If sold, Estrella TV will carry news reports from CNN en Español.

== MediaCo-owned stations ==
Stations are listed alphabetically by state and city of license.

=== Television / Radio Stations ===
Stations currently owned by Estrella Media
Media market	State	Station	Branding
Los Angeles	California	KBUA	Qué Buena 94.3 FM
Los Angeles	California	KBUE	Qué Buena 94.3 FM
Los Angeles	California	KEBN	Qué Buena 94.3 FM
Los Angeles	California	KRCA	Estrella TV
Los Angeles	California	KVNR	Little Saigon Radio 1480AM
Riverside	California	KRQB	Qué Buena 96.1 FM
Denver	Colorado	KETD	Estrella TV
Miami–Fort Lauderdale	Florida	WGEN-TV	Estrella TV
Chicago	Illinois	WESV-LD	Estrella TV
New York City	New York	WASA-LD	Hot 97 TV
New York City	New York	WMBC-TV	Estrella TV
New York City	New York	WQHT	Hot 97 (97.1 FM)
New York City	New York	WBLS	WBLS 107.5 FM
Beaumont–Port Arthur	Texas	KQQK	El Norte 107.9 FM
Beaumont–Port Arthur	Texas	KTJM	La Raza 98.5 FM
Dallas–Fort Worth	Texas	KNOR	La Raza 93.7 FM
Dallas–Fort Worth	Texas	KBOC	Luna 98.3 FM
Dallas–Fort Worth	Texas	KZZA	La Ranchera 106.7 FM
Houston	Texas	KNTE	La Raza 101.7 FM
Houston	Texas	KZJL	Estrella TV

=== Former stations ===
Stations formerly owned by Estrella Media
Media market	State/Prov.	Station	Purchased	Sold
Phoenix	Arizona	KVPA-LD	2009	2023
San Diego	California	KSDX-LD	2009	2023
Santa Ana	California	KWIZ	1997	2023
Dallas–Fort Worth	Texas	KTCY	2006	2013
Dallas–Fort Worth	Texas	KMPX	2004	2020
Dallas–Fort Worth	Texas	KZMP	2006	2023
Dallas–Fort Worth	Texas	KZMP-FM	2007	2021
Houston	Texas	KXBJ	2007	2012
Houston	Texas	KJOJ	2001	2012
Houston	Texas	KJOJ-FM	2001	2022
Houston	Texas	KEYH	2001	2024
Salt Lake City	Utah	KPNZ	2007	2018

== Programming ==
=== Television ===
The following television shows are produced by Estrella Media, TV Azteca and are distributed exclusively to Estrella owned & operated TV stations:

- Venga la Alegría
- Ventaneando
- Al Extremo
- Escape Perfecto
- La Rueda de la Suerte
- Noticias 24 Horas
- Noticero Estrella TV
- Noticias 61 Houston
- Noticias 62 Los Angeles
- Rica Famosa Latina
- Venga la Alegría: Fin de Semana
- Al Extremo: Fin de Semana
- MasterChef Latinos
- 100 Latinos Dijeron
- Tengo Talento, Mucho Talento
- MasterChef México: Celebrity
- Tu-Night con Omar Chaparro
- Boxeo Estrella TV
- Marcaje Personal

=== Radio ===
Qué Buena LA/OC/IE, La Buena NY, La Raza TX Brands feature Regional Mexican music & La Ranchera 106.7, El Norte 107.9 features Ranchera And Norteña music, whereas Luna Brand features Spanish Adult Contemporary Music. Over in New York City, 2 of its radio stations operate Urban music formats: WQHT Hot 97 playing mostly hip-hop and WBLS playing R&B music.
