= Gonzo Greg =

American radio personality (born 1965)

- Born: March 28, 1965 (age 60); Massachusetts, United States
- Occupation: Radio personality

Gonzo Greg Spillane (born March 28, 1965) is an American radio personality best known for various Morning Radio broadcasts, including The Big Dumb Show and Gonzo in the Morning.

== Biography ==
=== Early life ===
Spillane is a native of Massachusetts, but he moved to California in 1978.

Always wanting to work in radio, he began attending Long Beach City College in 1984 to pursue an associates degree in telecommunications.

=== Career ===
Gonzo began his radio journey in 1984 as an intern at glam metal radio station KNAC in the Los Angeles area. At the time, KNAC was an alternative rock station. When the format changed to a "Pure Rock" format, many of the former DJs left the station, giving Gonzo his first opportunity to move from intern to DJ. He started with the overnight shift before being moved to the night shift. In 1989, at the peak of glam metal's heyday, he was assigned to the coveted morning show, effectively launching his career.

Some notable moments from his tenure at KNAC include: Being the first DJ in the world to play Motley Crüe's "Dr. Feelgood", when the band brought in a test pressing, debuting the band Guns N' Roses, and providing a video voice-over for "Painkiller", the last Judas Priest album featuring front-man Rob Halford. It was also at KNAC that he acquired the radio name "Gonzo Greg".

When Gonzo left KNAC in 1991, he was immediately hired at WMMR in Philadelphia, Pennsylvania. There he hosted nights, and his show boosted ratings dramatically, becoming #1 among listeners.

In 1993, while at WMMR, Gonzo was offered a morning show position at KRXX ("93X") in Minneapolis, Minnesota. When WMMR would not match the more lucrative offer during contract renegotiation, Gonzo left Philadelphia. Unfortunately, his stay at 93X was short, as the station was sold in 1994, a few months after his hiring. During his time there, he hosted segments for Comedy Central's "RadioActive Television", and Tommy Chong surprised them with a guest appearance on their final broadcast.

Gonzo was promptly picked up by WTFX-FM in Louisville, Kentucky, for their morning show. While working at WTFX-FM, he also hosted a variety of local television segments.

After leaving WTFX-FM, Gonzo went straight to work at KCAL in San Bernardino, California, where former KNAC co-worker Rick Shaw was now program director. He continued to host mornings at WTFX until 1997.

Gonzo's next stop was WKRK in Detroit, Michigan, when it was K-Rock, to work for legendary programmer John Gorman. He began working there as host of the PM drive, until the format was changed to "Extreme Radio", during which time he moved to afternoons. When the station changed formats, this time to "FM Talk", he hosted mid-days with co-host Erin Carmen. After a few months, Erin left Detroit to work in Chicago, and Gonzo continued hosting solo, before moving off-air to work as Production Director until mid-2000.

From Detroit, Gonzo went on to WRZX (X103) in Indianapolis, Indiana. It was here that he created The Big Dumb Show with co-hosts Don Stuck and Beau Asner. The morning show was a success, with ratings at one point surpassing The Bob & Tom Show. Highlights from The Big Dumb Show include "Who Wants to Get Married at XFEST" (featuring reality TV star Rick Rockwell), where Gonzo dressed as the Pope, and their "Pumpkin Propulsion" competition, which made international news. Due to budget cuts, Gonzo and his co-hosts, which later included Nicole Padberg, left X103.

It was not long after their departure from X103 that Gonzo and Nicole were approached by KVGS in Las Vegas, Nevada, to host the morning show at the new Area 108. The Big Dumb Show was renamed to Gonzo in the Morning, and Gonzo won the Las Vegas Weekly's Readers' Choice Award for "Best Radio Personality". Gonzo in the Morning continued until summer of 2007, when they were let go due to budget cuts.

Gonzo worked at KVGS again in 2009, first hosting PM drive, then mornings again. The station changed formats to BOB-FM, and he continued to work mornings until his departure from the station in 2013.

On January 8 and 9, 2016, Gonzo participated in the 30th anniversary KNAC reunion.

On January 8, a podcast hosted by former KNAC DJ Ted "Thrasher"/"Thrash Pie" Pritchard, called "Thrashpie Radio", held a special show that featured many of the stations DJs, production directors, and other former employees, sharing stories about their time at the station. Also included were audio clips from various KNAC events, as well as bumpers and promos.

On January 9, Los Angeles rock station KLOS hosted a five-hour KNAC tribute, led by Stew Herrera, which duplicated KNAC's format, complete with jingles, bumpers, clips, and songs that were iconic to the station. Interviews were conducted with Scott Ian, Rob Halford, and Lars Ulrich. Aside from Gonzo and Stew, other former DJs present included Long Paul, Thrasher, and Dangerous Darren.

=== Current ===
Gonzo continues to reside in Las Vegas, Nevada, where he works as a voice-over talent. He also moonlighted as an announcer for the local roller derby league, the Sin City Roller Girls, through their 10th season.

He continues his love of radio with Gonzo.fm. The internet radio stream regularly features complete podcasts of various incarnations of the show, usually on the anniversary of their air date.

He is also a semi-regular guest host on the podcast "Phil Hulett and Friends", which is hosted by former KNAC DJ "Philthy Phil" Hulett, and produced by former KNAC DJ Mike Stark. The show is broadcast from L.A. Radio Studio in San Pedro, California.

After a several-year stint working as the sound engineer for the Nuclear Bombshells (a post-apocalyptic burlesque troupe), Gonzo is now the program director for Highway Radio. Broadcasting out of Pawn Plaza (where Pawn Stars is filmed), the studio is responsible for three long-standing stations that broadcast between Los Angeles and Las Vegas.

== Influences ==
Among Gonzo's influences was WRKO-AM morning host Dale Dorman; his first time on the air was calling in to win a contest.

He knew for certain he wanted to be a radio DJ when his father took him to WBCN in Boston. He saw Tony Baradini through the window, and he sat watching the DJ for an hour while his dad conducted business. WBCN morning host Charles Laquidara, who hosted a weekend show under the alter-ego "Duane Ingalls Glasscock", was also a huge inspiration.

His biggest influence, though, was Frazer Smith of KLOS.

Other influences include Freddie Snakeskin, KROQ's Jed the Fish, and Dr. Johnny Fever of WKRP in Cincinnati.

== Style ==
Gonzo Greg (also called Gonzo, Gonz, or The Gonz) derives his style of reporting from Hunter S. Thompson's Gonzo Journalism, as his name is a tribute. His entertainment can sometimes be crude, and most generally humorous. He tends to report the news with a disregard for accuracy and leans more toward delivery and humor. His daily routine of Morning Radio games, criticism of government and pop culture, and constant sarcasm has resulted in a cult following of listeners, some listening via streaming internet radio.
