= KBUE =

Radio station in Long Beach, California, United States

- Long Beach, California; United States
- Broadcast area: Greater Los Angeles; Orange County
- Frequency: 105.5 MHz
- Branding: Que Buena 105.5/94.3FM

Programming
- Language: Spanish
- Format: Regional Mexican

Ownership
- Owner: Mediaco Holding, Inc.; (Estrella MediaCo License LLC)
- Sister stations: KBUA; KEBN; KRQB; KVNR; KRCA

History
- First air date: January 1, 1961
- Former call signs: KBCA (1957–1958); KLFM (1958–1966); KNAC (1966–1995)
- Call sign meaning: Que Buena

Technical information
- Licensing authority: FCC
- Facility ID: 34386
- Class: A
- ERP: 3,000 watts
- HAAT: 142 meters (466 ft)
- Transmitter coordinates: 33.858°N 118.224°W

Links
- Public license information: Public file; LMS
- Website: www.estrellatv.com/es/radio/Que-Buena-Los-Angeles

KBUE (105.5 FM, "Que Buena 105.5/94.3 FM") is a commercial radio station licensed to Long Beach, California, that serves the Los Angeles metropolitan area. It is owned by Estrella Media and airs a Regional Mexican radio format. KBUE's studios and offices are on Estrella Way in Burbank.

KBUE's transmitter is located off East University Drive in Rancho Dominguez, California. It has an effective radiated power of 3,000 watts, making it a Class A station. To fill in gaps in KBUE's coverage area, "Que Buena" is also simulcast on co-owned and co-channel 94.3 KBUA in San Fernando and KEBN in Garden Grove. KXRS In the Inland Empire Also on the 105.5FM Frequency Signal Clashes With KBUE-FM In Corona, California.

== History ==
=== 105.5 FM ===
A construction permit for 105.5 FM in Beverly Hills was issued to Saul Levine in May 1957 as KBCA. The construction permit was sold the next year to Long Beach FM Broadcasting Company, which moved the proposed facility to Long Beach. It was sold the next year to Harriscope Music Corporation, owned by Bert Harris, and made its debut January 1, 1961, as KLFM. However, Levine did not get the station built, even though he would go on to own KKGO and other California stations. Finally, on New Year's Day 1961, KLFM signed on the air. It was owned by the Harriscope Music Corporation, with Bert Harris serving as president and general manager. The station was initially powered at only 330 watts, keeping its signal restricted to Long Beach and adjacent communities. KLFM's studios were initially located in a trailer adjacent to its transmitter on Signal Hill, moving to Lakewood Center and then to 4406 Greenmeadow Road. KLFM played Top 40 hits in an era where most young people used AM radios to hear their music. In the 1960s, most FM stations simply simulcast their co-owned AM stations, or played easy listening or classical music, often using broadcast automation.

==== KNAC ====
Harriscope sold KLFM in 1966 to the McCray Broadcasting Company, headed by W. Mike McCray, Carl C. Loucks, and Robert Switzer. McCray changed the call sign to KNAC and instituted a full-time Middle of the Road (MOR) format, but the station went silent from March through August 1967. That year, the International Cities Broadcasting Corporation bought KNAC and increased its power to 2,100 watts. Additionally, KNAC relocated to the International Tower in downtown Long Beach.

In late 1967, the station began programming progressive rock from 6 p.m. to 6 am. The programming proved successful enough to make the rock format full time by 1969 when Harden Broadcasting bought KNAC. Air talent at KNAC during this era included Jim Ladd (later of KLOS), Jerry Longden (later of KROQ), and Program Director Ron McCoy. Ladd left KNAC to work for KLOS in 1971 while McCoy stayed on through much of the 1970s. The station stayed with progressive rock until 1980 when it made a significant adjustment in its rock format.

In 1980, the station adopted one of the first full-time commercial alternative rock formats in the country. Up to that point, Pasadena-based KROQ-FM and stations in Phoenix, Seattle, and New York City had attempted such formats. KROQ notwithstanding, most commercial attempts at alternative rock were short-lived. KNAC began using the slogan "Rock and Rhythm" and programmed a mix of "new wave", techno, punk, and some classic rock from the 1950s and 1960s. The station gathered media attention, but it was dwarfed by KROQ-FM's stellar ratings and Rick Carroll-consulted "Rock of the 80s" Alternative format. In late 1985, KNAC was acquired by Fred Sands, a Los Angeles-based realtor.

On January 8, 1986, the station flipped to a "hard rock/heavy metal" format, the first of its kind on a commercial station in the United States. Several air staff members of the heavy metal station eventually went on to the original satellite-distributed, nationally syndicated "Z Rock" format in September 1986. KNAC played a wide variety of heavy metal and rock-based music from the late-1960s to 1995, the radio station's last year on the air, including classic rock, hard rock, traditional heavy metal, progressive rock/metal, power metal, glam metal, thrash metal, crossover thrash, death metal, groove metal, alternative metal, and grunge. KNAC was also responsible for helping launch the careers of previously low-key metal and hard rock bands, and is often credited for being the first radio station to promote new bands before their large-scale success, including Metallica, Guns N' Roses, Bon Jovi, Megadeth, Skid Row, Metal Church, Pantera, Alice in Chains, Soundgarden, Stone Temple Pilots, White Zombie, Poison, Testament, Stryper, Lizzy Borden, and Armored Saint. However, revenues were not what management had hoped for. While much of KNAC's core-base of artists were considered mainstream, the station played enough "cutting edge" artists of the day and acquired a legend that survived long beyond its demise in spring 1995. The station inspired tribute pages and an Internet radio station.

In 1995, Liberman Broadcasting, a Spanish-language broadcasting company, bought KNAC for $13 million. On February 15 of that year, after playing "Fade to Black" by Metallica, KNAC signed off for the last time. Three weeks later, on March 6, the Spanish format launched with "Guadalajara" by Mariachi Sol de México being the first song played. The station would switch to the KBUE calls the same day. The format was "Ranchera-Mexican style" according to program director Fidel Fausto. The new call letters and format did not change the fact that KBUE's signal only covered southern Los Angeles County and northwestern Orange County. Liberman would buy additional radio stations to increase the coverage of the Que Buena format.

==== Legacy ====
Logo of KNAC.COM (a precursor to KNAC.FM) on display in Westchester, Los Angeles, California (2026)

Former KNAC DJ Gonzo Greg later became vice president of programming for Barstow, California's KRXV and its sister stations. On October 31, 2025, after holding a tribute to KNAC over the Labor Day weekend, active rock sister station KHDR revived KNAC's former Pure Rock branding, and its simulcast partner also changed its call letters to KNAC (formalizing as KNAC.FM).

=== 94.3 FM ===
The station on 94.3 FM in San Fernando first signed on the air as KVFM in 1958, but for a long time it was KGIL-FM, a radio station playing adult standards, along with sister station to KGIL (1260 AM). On August 5, 1989, it became KMGX, "Magic 94.3". (KMGX is now a classic rock station in Bend, Oregon.

The station at 94.3 FM in Garden Grove signed on in 1961 as KGGK, later to become KTBT, KORJ, KIKF ("KIK-FM", a country music station), and KMXN. When it was acquired by Liberman Broadcasting, it switched to KEBN, another call sign representing the "Que Buena" format.

On November 18, 1994, the two stations on 94.3 began simulcasting the same country music format and 94.3 in San Fernando became KYKF. This lasted until October 31, 1996, after the San Fernando station was sold to Liberman and started simulcasting KBUE. On January 31, 1997, it acquired the KBUA call letters. "Que Buena" now reached most of metropolitan Los Angeles County, though reception remains difficult in some regions, such as the San Gabriel Valley and Malibu. A booster station, KBUA-FM1 in Santa Clarita, California, extends the signal's reach into the Santa Clarita Valley.

On June 25, 2000, 94.3 in Garden Grove became "Cool 94.3" in Anaheim, with a "cool AC" format (somewhat of a precursor to the Jack FM format), and the call letters changed to KMXN on September 29. That call sign was likely being chosen because the format was similar to previous Orange County station KXMX known as "Mix 95.9" (now KAIA). Liberman acquired KMXN in 2003, and on January 7, started simulcasting the KBUE/KBUA signal, giving "Que Buena" coverage in nearly all of Orange County. On May 15, the call letters became KEBN.

== KRQB ==
On August 1, 2007, Liberman added another "Que Buena" outlet to the lineup, with the acquisition of Rhythmic Contemporary 96.1 KWIE, licensed to San Jacinto, California, from Magic Broadcasting. The call sign was immediately changed to KRQB. The addition of the new station extended Liberman's "Que Buena" brand into Riverside and San Bernardino counties. (The previous owners transferred the KWIE call letters to 93.5 in Ontario, as a simulcast of KDAY.) Other than the morning show, programming on KRQB is separate from that of the other Que Buena stations.

== Genre ==
Que Buena primarily targets the "Mexican American" or "paisa" community of the greater Los Angeles area. "Paisa" is a slang term in Spanish, meaning those who are culturally Mexican or "paisanos", and thus listen to such legendary Mexican artists such as Chalino Sánchez and Saul Viera. Other artists who gained quick popularity because of KBUE were El Narquillo, Adán Sánchez, and Lupillo Rivera, to name a few. "La Que Buena" or "Aqui Suena La Que Buena", as it is commonly referred to, also plays the genre "banda" with primarily the "La Banda el Recodo" as its focus. Other artists who have airplay are El As de la Sierra, El Chapo, Valentín Elizalde, Jenni Rivera, Rogelio Martínez, El Potro de Sinaloa, El Coyote y su Banda, Los Tucanes, Los Rieleros, Los Incomparables, Los Tucanes, Los Razos, Los Originales de San Juan, and many others.

There has been a recent boom within the "paisa" community with the beginning of "el movimiento alterado". Artists that fit this criterion are Larry Hernandez, Roberto Tapia, Enigma Norteno, Gerardo Ortiz, Noel Torres, Aldredito Olivas, El Komander, and others.
