= KVNR =

Radio station in Santa Ana, California

- Santa Ana, California; United States
- Broadcast area: Orange County
- Frequency: 1480 kHz
- Branding: Little Saigon Radio

Programming
- Language: Vietnamese
- Format: Vietnamese

Ownership
- Owner: Mediaco Holding, Inc.; (Estrella MediaCo LLC)
- Sister stations: KBUA, KBUE, KEBN, KRCA, KRQB

History
- First air date: December 10, 1926
- Former call signs: KWTC (1926–1929); KREG (1929–1935); KVOE (1935–1954); KWIZ (1954–1998)
- Call sign meaning: "Vietnamese Radio"

Technical information
- Licensing authority: FCC
- Facility ID: 37223
- Class: B
- Power: 5,000 watts
- Transmitter coordinates: 33°45′6.1″N 117°54′41.2″W

Links
- Public license information: Public file; LMS
- Webcast: Listen live
- Website: nguoiviet.tv/littlesaigonradio

KVNR (1480 AM) is a commercial radio station licensed to Santa Ana, California, United States, and serving Orange and Los Angeles counties. It is owned by MediaCo, and broadcasts a Vietnamese language format known as "Little Saigon Radio". Programming is also simulcasted on DirecTV channel 2039.

KVNR airs Vietnamese talk shows, newscasts, variety shows, and popular music. The station also rebroadcasts the Vietnamese services of Radio France Internationale and Radio Free Asia . This station directly competes with KALI-FM 106.3 MHz, which also airs Vietnamese-language programming in the Los Angeles metropolitan area.

== History ==
KVNR was first licensed, as KWTC, in October 1926 to Dr. John W. Hancock, and signed on the air on December 10, 1926. In the 1980s and 1990s, the station was KWIZ, which aired a full service adult contemporary format. In 1947, it added an FM counterpart, KVOE-FM, at 96.7 MHz.
