= KEBN =

Radio station in Garden Grove, California, United States

Coordinates: 33.781°N 117.893°W

- Garden Grove, California; United States
- Broadcast area: Los Angeles/Orange County, California
- Frequency: 94.3 MHz
- Branding: Que Buena 105.5/94.3FM

Programming
- Format: Regional Mexican

Ownership
- Owner: Mediaco Holding, Inc.; (Estrella MediaCo License LLC)
- Sister stations: KBUE, KBUA, KRQB, KVNR; Also part of the Liberman Cluster: TV Station KRCA

History
- First air date: June 21, 1961
- Call sign meaning: KE(Que) BueNa

Technical information
- Facility ID: 50513
- Class: A
- ERP: 6,000 watts
- HAAT: 73 meters

Links
- Webcast: Listen Live
- Website: www.aquisuena.com

KEBN 94.3 FM, Garden Grove, California, KBUE 105.5 FM, Long Beach, California and KBUA 94.3 FM, San Fernando, California are a trimulcast comprising Que Buena 105.5/94.3 FM, a Spanish language regional Mexican music station owned by Estrella Media.

== History ==
The station on 94.3 FM at Garden Grove signed on in 1961 as KGGK, later to become KTBT, KORJ, KIKF ("KIK-FM", a country music station), and KMXN before finally KEBN.

On November 18, 1994, KEBN and KBUA, the other area station on 94.3 FM began simulcasting the same country music format and 94.3 in San Fernando became KYKF. This lasted until October 31, 1996, after the San Fernando station was sold to Liberman and started simulcasting KBUE, and on January 31, 1997, it acquired the KBUA call letters. "Que Buena" now reached most of metropolitan Los Angeles County, though reception remains difficult in some regions, such as the San Gabriel Valley and Malibu. A booster station, KBUA-FM1 in Santa Clarita, California, extends the signal's reach into the Santa Clarita Valley.

On June 25, 2000, 94.3 at Garden Grove became "Cool 94.3" in Anaheim, with a "cool AC" format (somewhat of a precursor to the Jack FM format), and the call letters changed to KMXN on September 29. Liberman acquired KMXN in 2003 and on January 7 started simulcasting the KBUE/KBUA signal, giving "Que Buena" coverage in nearly all of Orange County. On May 15, the call letters became KEBN.

== KRQB ==
On August 1, 2007, Liberman added another "Que Buena" to the lineup with the acquisition of Rhythmic Contemporary KWIE, licensed to San Jacinto, California, from Magic Broadcasting. The call sign was immediately changed to KRQB. The addition of the new station extends Liberman's "Que Buena" brand into Riverside and San Bernardino counties. (The previous owners transferred the KWIE calls to 93.5 in Ontario, a simulcast of KDAY.) Other than the morning show, programming on KRQB is separate from that of these stations.

== Genre ==
Currently Que Buena primarily targets the "Mexican American" or "paisa" community of the greater Los Angeles area. Paisa being a slang term in Spanish meaning those who are culturally Mexican or "paisanos". Thus listen to such legendary Mexican artists such as Chalino Sánchez and Saul Viera. Other artists who gained quick popularity because of KBUE were El Narquillo, Adán Sánchez, and Lupillo Rivera to name a few. "La Que Buena" or "Aqui Suena La Que Buena", as it is commonly referred to, also plays the genre "banda" with primarily the "La Banda el Recodo" as its focus. Other artists who have airplay are El As de la Sierra, El Chapo, Valentín Elizalde, Jenny Rivera, Rogelio Martínez, El Potro de Sinaloa, El Coyote y su Banda, Los Tucanes, Los Rieleros, Los Incomparables, Los Tucanes, Los Razos, Los Originales de San Juan, and many others.

There has been a recent boom within the "Paisa" community with the beginning of "el movimiento alterado". Artists that fit this criterion are Larry Hernandez, Roberto Tapia, Enigma Norteno, Gerardo Ortiz, Noel Torres, Aldredito Olivas, El Komander, and others.
