= WASA-LD =

Television station in Port Jervis, New York

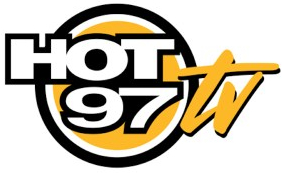
- Port Jervis–New York, New York; United States
- City: Port Jervis, New York
- Channels: Digital: 13 (VHF), shared with WKOB-LD; Virtual: 24
- Branding: Hot 97 TV

Programming
- Affiliations: 24.1: Hot 97 TV; for others, see § Subchannels

Ownership
- Owner: MediaCo; (Estrella Television License LLC)
- Sister stations: WBLS, WQHT

History
- Founded: 1970s
- First air date: January 30, 2003
- Former call signs: W64AA (1970s–1983, 2001); W64CW (2003–2007); WASA-LP (2007–2010)
- Former channel numbers: Analog: 64 (UHF, 1970–2010); Digital: 5 (UHF, 2010–2018)
- Former affiliations: Independent (simulcast of WNEW-TV, 1970s–1983; as stand-alone station, 2003–2010); Dark (1983–2001); Infomercials (2010–2012); Estrella TV (2012–2026)

Technical information
- Licensing authority: FCC
- Facility ID: 167320
- Class: LD
- ERP: 3 kW
- HAAT: 412.8 m (1,354 ft)
- Transmitter coordinates: 40°42′46.8″N 74°0′47.3″W

Links
- Public license information: LMS
- Website: www.hot97.com/tv/

WASA-LD (channel 24) is a low-power television station licensed to Port Jervis, New York, United States, serving the New York City area. The station is owned by MediaCo, and transmits from atop One World Trade Center in lower Manhattan.

WASA briefly used virtual channel 64 to match its former analog channel number, then later changed its virtual channel to 24. It does not use its actual digital TV channel assignment on the air, because WNYE-TV calls itself Channel 25, its long-time analog channel number. WNYE-TV's digital channel is actually 24.

== History ==
=== As W64AA ===
In the 1970s, the station signed on using UHF channel 64 as W64AA. The original owner was Metromedia. It was one of several television translators in New York City which operated at the upper end of the UHF television band to provide reliable coverage to sections of New York where reception was compromised by construction of the World Trade Center. This translator station relayed WNEW-TV (now Fox flagship WNYW), which at the time operated over VHF channel 5.

Originally, most New York City television stations operated their main transmitters from the Empire State Building. However, reliable reception was compromised for some viewers once the majority of the World Trade Center was constructed, thus necessitating the use of the UHF translators. In response, nearly all of the TV stations, including WNEW-TV, relocated to the North Tower of the World Trade Center in 1975.

In 1982, UHF channels 70 through 83 were decommissioned for use as television stations, and the frequencies were reassigned for the Advanced Mobile Phone System, an analog mobile phone system standard developed by Bell Labs which was officially introduced in the Americas in 1983. TV stations operating on these channels were either switched to other broadcast channels, sold, or deleted, depending on the owners' intentions.

While some stations, such as WPIX and WCBS-TV, continued broadcasting over relay translators by moving to lower channels, WNEW-TV ultimately decide to shut down channel 64. The allocation remained inactive for eighteen years, until channel 11 WPIX temporarily used channel 64 as a translator station in 2001, following the September 11 attacks. Within a few weeks, WPIX service over channel 11 was fully restored. The channel 64 allocation was once again deleted by the end of 2001.

=== Infomercials and Chinese programming ===
Two years later, W64CW was signed on over UHF channel 64 on January 30, 2003, by Venture Technologies. It originally operated with 30 watts, and its transmitter was located at a site just west of downtown Port Jervis, at the triangle where New York, New Jersey, and Pennsylvania meet. The call sign was changed on January 12, 2007, to WASA-LP. The station had planned to carry Estrella TV in September 2008, but that network was picked up instead by a subchannel of WPIX.

WASA had a problem: it appeared its signal would go off the air every few minutes and then turn back on, resulting in a tear-down pixelation visual effect. This was corrected when the station dropped the NYC Slideshow video airing on virtual 64.2 since its DTV inception in favor of two new subchannels promoting a launch of English and Chinese feeds of ICN (Information Culture News) Channel.

Originally, WASA aired a looping rotation of five half-hour infomercials running 24 hours a day on its primary channel. Technically, the five shows each interspersed with the legal station ID were recorded on one DVD and played on a Philips DVD player (whose screensaver is seen when the loop ends and is not restarted). This looping rotation was ceased in January 2011. On April 22, 2011, the looping infomercial programming was restored.

=== Sale to Liberman ===
In April 2009, Venture Technologies, owner of WASA-LD, said it would sell the station to Burbank, California–based Liberman Broadcasting (which was renamed Estrella Media in February 2020, following a corporate reorganization of the company under private equity firm HPS Investment Partners, LLC, and in turn, acquired by MediaCo in 2025) for $6 million, making New York the sixth market served by Liberman. The deal closed on March 1, 2010. By 2012, WASA-LD switched from infomercials to Estrella TV.

=== Switch to Urban programming ===
On March 30, 2026, MediaCo announced that on March 31, WASA-LD would drop Estrella TV to make way for the company's new network Hot 97 TV—a free ad-supported streaming television (FAST) channel produced by New York City sister urban contemporary radio station WQHT that features programming on hip-hop music and culture.

This made WASA-LD the second television station in the United States overall to affiliate with Hot 97 TV; the first was CNZ Communications-owned WHOT-TV in Atlanta.

== Technical information ==
=== Subchannels ===
Subchannels of WASA-LD and WKOB-LD
| License | Subchannel | Res. | Short name | Programming |
|---|---|---|---|---|
| WASA-LD | 24.1 | 720p | WASA-LD | Hot 97 TV |
| WASA-LD | 24.2 | 720p | WASA-LD | [Blank] |
| WASA-LD | 24.3 | 480i | WASA-LD | Confess |
| WKOB-LD | 42.1 | 720p | WKOB-LD | ULFN |
| WKOB-LD | 42.2 | 720p | WKOB-LD | Fubo Sports Network |
| WKOB-LD | 42.3 | 480i | WKOB-LD | Law & Crime |
| WKOB-LD | 42.4 | 480i | WKOB-LD | Hasbro Legends |

=== Analog-to-digital conversion ===
As a low-power station, WASA-LP was not required to turn off its analog signal on June 12, 2009, which was the end of the digital TV conversion period for full-service stations.

WASA-LP has since built its digital transmitter, and flash-cut its operations on digital channel 25 in 2010, with its call sign changed to WASA-LD.
