= KFAA-TV =

Television station in Decatur, Texas

- Decatur–Dallas–Fort Worth, Texas; United States
- City: Decatur, Texas
- Channels: Digital: 30 (UHF); Virtual: 29
- Branding: KFAA 29

Programming
- Affiliations: 29.1: Independent with Quest; 29.2: Hot 97 TV; 8.8: ABC

Ownership
- Owner: Tegna Inc., a subsidiary of Nexstar Media Group; (WFAA-TV, Inc.)
- Sister stations: WFAA; Nexstar: KDAF

History
- First air date: September 15, 1993
- Former call signs: KMPX (1993–2024)
- Former channel numbers: Analog: 29 (UHF, 1993–2009)
- Former affiliations: Daystar (1993–2004); Spanish independent (2004–2009); Estrella TV (29.1 2009–2024, 29.2 2024–2026)
- Call sign meaning: Similar to WFAA; see Call signs in the United States

Technical information
- Licensing authority: FCC
- Facility ID: 73701
- ERP: 1,000 kW
- HAAT: 544 m (1,785 ft)
- Transmitter coordinates: 32°35′20″N 96°58′5.9″W

Links
- Public license information: Public file; LMS
- Website: wfaa.com

KFAA-TV (channel 29) is an independent television station licensed to Decatur, Texas, United States, serving the Dallas–Fort Worth metroplex. It is owned by the Tegna subsidiary of Nexstar Media Group alongside ABC affiliate WFAA (channel 8); Nexstar also owns CW station KDAF (channel 33). KFAA-TV and WFAA are based at the WFAA Communications Center Studios in Downtown Dallas, with transmitters in Cedar Hill, Texas.

Channel 29 signed on the air as KMPX in 1993 and was the original flagship station of the Daystar Television Network, a Christian ministry that operated from headquarters in the Dallas suburb of Colleyville and later Bedford. In 2003, Daystar acquired KDTN (channel 2) and sold KMPX to Liberman Broadcasting. Under Liberman, the station was a Spanish-language outlet, first as an independent station and later as the Dallas-area affiliate of Liberman's Estrella TV network. In 2020, KMPX was acquired by Tegna, giving it UHF spectrum to improve the reception of WFAA while continuing to broadcast Estrella TV as its primary subchannel. Tegna acquired the rights to telecast Dallas Mavericks basketball in 2024, with channel 29 airing most of the team's games, and concurrently switched the primary subchannel to an English-language independent station under the new call sign KFAA-TV.

== Prior history of channel 29 ==
Channel 29 was originally allocated to Dallas, and two construction permits were issued for the channel. One was to be KLIF-TV, the television counterpart to radio station KLIF (1190 AM), owned by Gordon McLendon. A second attempt was made in 1962 to launch KAEI-TV on channel 29. Owned by and named for Automated Electronics Inc., the station would have broadcast printed quotes, news, and weather information. Since television sets were not required to include UHF tuners until the All-Channel Receiver Act went into effect in 1964, the company proposed to lease converters and UHF antennas to companies to install in their offices. Though the group hoped to be weeks away from signing the station on the air and gave dates of April 15 and June 1 for a planned sign-on, AEI never put it into service. The company's assets were acquired in late 1963.

In 1966, three applicants filed to build new stations on channel 29—Grandview Broadcasting (which later took itself out of the running), Overmyer Communications, and Maxwell Electronics. In a successful bid to give both applicants a channel, Overmyer proposed changing out channel 29 for channels 27 and 33 at Dallas; Overmyer never built its station on channel 27, and Maxwell signed on KMEC-TV on channel 33 in October 1967.

== KMPX: Daystar and Liberman ownership ==
In 1985, three applicants vied for a license to operate a television station on channel 29, including the Wise County Messenger newspaper, owned by former WBAP-TV (channel 5, now KXAS-TV) anchor Roy Eaton, whose petition had resulted in the allocation to Decatur. After a settlement was reached, the construction permit was granted to Decatur Telecasting, owned by Charlotte, North Carolina, housewife Karen Hicks, in December 1985. However, an unanticipated setback in the form of the sale of its planned tower site to new owners who would not allow the station to locate there led to years of delays and a sale to Word of God Fellowship, a ministry of Marcus and Joni Lamb. The Lambs sold the first station they had built, WMCF in Montgomery, Alabama, to finance the move to Texas. KMPX served as the basis for the launch of the Daystar Television Network on January 1, 1997. The network and KMPX operated from studios in Colleyville until moving to Bedford in 2002.

In 2003, Daystar acquired Denton-licensed noncommercial station KDTN (channel 2) from North Texas Public Broadcasting. KMPX was then sold to Liberman Broadcasting for $37 million in a sale that was finalized on January 13, 2004; after Liberman took over on that date, the station was converted into a Spanish-language independent station featuring programming distributed by the company. On September 14, 2009, KMPX became a charter owned-and-operated station of Liberman's Estrella TV network, which carried some programming seen during the station's tenure as an independent. Liberman Broadcasting became Estrella Media in February 2020, following a corporate reorganization of the company under private equity firm HPS Investment Partners, LLC.

== Duopoly with WFAA ==
Tegna Inc., owner of ABC affiliate WFAA (channel 8), purchased KMPX from Liberman on September 25, 2020, for $19 million. The deal included a five-year affiliation agreement between Estrella and Tegna, as well as an option for Estrella to purchase WFAA's VHF license. The transaction for KMPX was completed on November 20. The purchase allowed Tegna to begin simulcasting WFAA on a UHF-band transmitter, as virtual channel 8.8, to improve reception. Had the Estrella option been exercised, Estrella would have acquired the VHF facility of WFAA, essentially inducing a facility swap.

In 2022, Tegna filed to sell itself to Standard General and Apollo Global Management for $5.4 billion. KMPX and WFAA, along with KVUE in Austin and KHOU and KTBU in Houston, were to be resold to Cox Media Group. The sale was canceled on May 22, 2023.

=== KFAA-TV: Mavericks basketball and relaunch ===
On September 6, 2024, Tegna announced a deal with the NBA's Dallas Mavericks to move the team's local broadcasts to its television stations. As part of the deal, channel 29 originates and airs all Mavericks games not picked up by a national network, with sister station WFAA simulcasting 15 games. On September 14, Tegna requested to change KMPX's call sign to KFAA-TV effective October 20. On October 17, Tegna announced that KFAA-TV would become an English-language independent station under the new branding KFAA 29, with Estrella TV moving to its second digital subchannel.

KFAA announced an agreement with the Texas Legends, the G League affiliate of the Mavericks, on December 2, 2024. On February 13, 2025, KFAA announced a deal with the WNBA's Dallas Wings to become the team's local broadcast partner, which timed to UConn's Paige Bueckers being taken two months later as the first player picked by the Wings in the 2025 WNBA draft.

In February 2026, KFAA announced an agreement with Dallas Trinity FC of the USL Super League to become the team's local broadcast home. Games will air on KFAA or stream on WFAA+.

Nexstar Media Group, the Irving-based owner of KDAF (channel 33), acquired Tegna in a deal announced in August 2025 and completed on March 19, 2026. A temporary restraining order issued one week later by the U.S. District Court for the Eastern District of California, later escalated to a preliminary injunction, has prevented KDAF from being integrated into WFAA and KFAA.

In late July 2026, Estrella TV moved to KTXD-TV after nearly 17 years on channel 29. The network would be replaced on channel 29.2 with Hot 97 TV.

== Technical information ==
=== Subchannels ===
The station's signal is multiplexed:

Subchannels of KFAA-TV
Subchannel	Res.	Short name	Programming
29.1	720p	KFAA-TV	Independent with Quest
29.2	720p	Hot97	Hot 97 TV
8.8	720p	WFAA-HD	ABC (WFAA)

Simulcast of subchannels of another station

=== Analog-to-digital conversion ===
KMPX shut down its analog signal, over UHF channel 29, on June 12, 2009, as part of the federally mandated transition from analog to digital television. The station's digital signal remained on its pre-transition UHF channel 30, using virtual channel 29.
