= KETD =

Television station in Castle Rock, Colorado

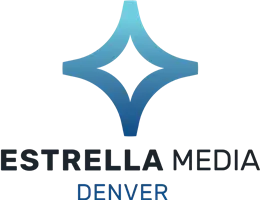
- Castle Rock–Denver, Colorado; United States
- City: Castle Rock, Colorado
- Channels: Digital: 15 (UHF); Virtual: 53
- Branding: Estrella TV KETD 53

Programming
- Affiliations: 53.1: Estrella TV; for others, see § Subchannels

Ownership
- Owner: MediaCo; (Estrella Television License LLC)

History
- First air date: July 1, 1990
- Former call signs: KWHD (1990–2010)
- Former channel numbers: Analog: 53 (UHF, 1990–2009); Digital: 45 (UHF, until 2020)
- Former affiliations: LeSEA (1990–2010)
- Call sign meaning: Estrella TV Denver

Technical information
- Licensing authority: FCC
- Facility ID: 37101
- ERP: 200 kW
- HAAT: 314.8 m (1,033 ft)
- Transmitter coordinates: 39°40′17″N 105°13′8″W

Links
- Public license information: Public file; LMS
- Website: estrellatv.com

KETD (channel 53) is a television station licensed to Castle Rock, Colorado, United States, broadcasting the Spanish-language Estrella TV network to the Denver area. Owned and operated by MediaCo, the station maintains offices on East Jamison Circle in Englewood, and its transmitter is located on Mount Morrison in western Jefferson County.

== History ==
The station first signed on the air on July 1, 1990, as KWHD. Founded by LeSEA Broadcasting (now Family Broadcasting Corporation), the station carried a mix of Christian-targeted programs, family-oriented syndicated programs and movies. Christian programming aired for much of the broadcast day, with breakaway windows for secular programming (including sitcoms, westerns and public domain movies) each weekday from 2 to 7 p.m. and a scattered amount for a few hours a day on Saturdays, which included a morning children's program block, and a schedule consisting entirely of Christian-oriented religious programs on Sundays. By 2008, KWHD claimed to be "the only full-time, commercial, independent TV station in Colorado." Its schedule by this point was split between family-oriented secular programming and local sports programming 40% of the time and Christian religious programs for the remaining 60% of the broadcast day outside of Sundays.

On January 28, 2010, LeSEA announced that it would sell KWHD to Liberman Broadcasting (which was renamed Estrella Media in February 2020, following a corporate reorganization of the company under private equity firm HPS Investment Partners, LLC). On June 1, 2010, the station became an owned-and-operated station of the Liberman-owned Estrella TV and changed its call letters to KETD. As part of the deal, KETD agreed to lease its second digital subchannel to LeSEA to continue carrying its programming (which was also carried on the station's former semi-translator KWHS-LD in Colorado Springs, which LeSEA owned until 2018).

== Technical information ==
=== Subchannels ===
The station's signal is multiplexed:

Subchannels of KETD
Channel	Res.	Short name	Programming
53.1	720p	KETD-HD	Estrella TV
53.2	720p	E-NEWS	Estrella News
53.3	480i		Confess
53.4	480i	SHOP-HQ	ShopHQ
53.5	480i	BUZZR	Buzzr

=== Analog-to-digital conversion ===
KETD shut down its analog signal, over UHF channel 53, on January 16, 2009. The station's digital signal remained on its pre-transition UHF channel 46, using virtual channel 53.
