= KBUA =

Radio station in San Fernando, California, United States

Coordinates: 34.284°N 118.472°W

- San Fernando, California; United States
- Broadcast area: Los Angeles; Orange County, California
- Frequency: 94.3 MHz
- Branding: Que Buena 105.5/94.3FM

Programming
- Language: Spanish
- Format: Regional Mexican

Ownership
- Owner: MediaCo; (Estrella MediaCo LLC)
- Sister stations: KBUE; KEBN; KRQB; KVNR; Also part of the Liberman Cluster: TV Station KRCA

History
- First air date: 1958
- Former call signs: KVFM (1958–1976); KGIL-FM (1976–1989); KMGX (1989–1994); KYKF (1994–1997)
- Call sign meaning: "Que Buena"

Technical information
- Licensing authority: FCC
- Facility ID: 10097
- Class: A
- ERP: 6,000 watts
- HAAT: 26 meters (85 ft)

Links
- Public license information: Public file; LMS
- Website: www.estrellatv.com/es/radio/Que-Buena-Los-Angeles

KBUA 94.3 FM, San Fernando, California, KBUE 105.5 FM, Long Beach, California, and KEBN 94.3 FM, Garden Grove, California, are a trimulcast comprising Que Buena 105.5–94.3 FM, a Spanish language regional Mexican music station owned by MediaCo.

== History ==
KVFM signed on the air November 14, 1958. It was owned by the San Fernando Valley Broadcasting Company, a business of Walter Gelb and Ted Bolnick. KVFM, "Valley FM", was the first FM radio station for the San Fernando Valley, maintaining studios in the Porter Hotel. Spectra Properties acquired the station in 1960. In 1972, Spectra attempted to sell KVFM to West Coast Media, owners of KTBT 94.3 FM in Garden Grove; the sale was not consummated. Pacific Western Broadcasting bought KVFM in 1974 and sold it to Buckley Broadcasting in 1976. Buckley relaunched the frequency as KGIL-FM, a radio station playing pop standards and sister station to KGIL AM. On August 5, 1989, it became KMGX, "Magic 94.3".

Buckley sold KMGX to Chagal Broadcasting in 1994. On November 18, KBUA and KEBN, the other area station on 94.3 FM, began simulcasting the same country music format, and 94.3 in San Fernando became KYKF. This lasted until October 31, 1996, after the San Fernando station was sold to Liberman and started simulcasting KBUE, and on January 31, 1997, it acquired the KBUA call letters. Que Buena now reached most of metropolitan Los Angeles County, though reception remains difficult in some regions, such as the San Gabriel Valley and Malibu. A booster station, KBUA-FM1 in Santa Clarita, California, extends the signal's reach into the Santa Clarita Valley.

On June 25, 2000, 94.3 in Garden Grove became "Cool 94.3" in Anaheim, with a "cool AC" format (somewhat of a precursor to the Jack FM format), and the call letters changed to KMXN on September 29. Liberman acquired KMXN in 2003, and on January 7 of that year, started simulcasting the KBUE–KBUA signal, giving Que Buena coverage in nearly all of Orange County.
