= KWIZ =

Radio station in Santa Ana, California

- Santa Ana, California; United States
- Broadcast area: Los Angeles-Orange County
- Frequency: 96.7 MHz (HD Radio)
- Branding: Vision Latina 96.7

Programming
- Format: Spanish Christian

Ownership
- Owner: Universal Church of the Kingdom of God; (The Universal Church, Inc.)
- Sister stations: KJLA

History
- First air date: 1947; (as KVOE-FM)
- Former call signs: KVOE-FM (1947–1954); KWIZ-FM (1954–1998)

Technical information
- Facility ID: 37225
- Class: A
- ERP: 6,000 watts
- HAAT: 62 meters (203 ft)
- Transmitter coordinates: 33.802°N 117.796°W

Links
- Website: visionlatina.com

KWIZ (96.7 FM) is a commercial radio station licensed to Santa Ana, California, and broadcasting to the Los Angeles-Orange County area. KWIZ airs a Spanish Christian radio format branded as "Vision Latina 96.7 FM". It is currently owned by the Universal Church with studios and offices are on West 5th Street in Santa Ana. The transmitter is off East Glen Albyn Lane in Orange, California.

KWIZ is not licensed by the Federal Communications Commission to broadcast in the HD Radio hybrid format, yet the HD Radio Guide indicates that KWIZ broadcasts on one HD channel.

== History ==
96.7 FM signed on as KVOE-FM in 1947, simulcast with KVOE (1480 AM, now KVNR). The two stations were owned by Voice of the Orange Empire, Inc., Ltd. They were Mutual Broadcasting System and Don Lee Network affiliates. The studios were on East 5th Street in Santa Ana. On July 1, 1954, KVOE-AM-FM changed their call signs to KWIZ and KWIZ-FM, but still under the same ownership.

Ernest and Franc Spencer sold Voice of the Orange Empire in 1965 to the Davis Broadcasting Company. By 1970, KWIZ-FM had separate programming. The AM station aired a full service middle of the road format of popular music, news and information. The FM had an automated easy listening format, which would change to soft adult contemporary music in the mid-1980s.

Liberman acquired KWIZ-AM-FM in 1987. In 1990, KWIZ-FM began carrying Los Angeles Dodgers games in Korean, and on March 10, 1991, it flipped to a full-time Korean format, brokered from Radio Korea. In 1993, after another brokering deal, KWIZ-FM flipped to Vietnamese as "Little Saigon Radio."

Other brokered programming deals soon followed. In addition to religious and ethnic talk shows, KWIZ-FM also was home to several niche format music programs, including reggae, alternative rock and surf rock. At night, the station's time was leased to "Renegade Radio," a dance music/techno music format hosted by DJ Racer and former MARS-FM DJ Mike "Fright" Ivankay. Renegade Radio also broadcast MARS-FM music director Swedish Egil's syndicated Groove Radio program, which later became a full-time local electronica format at KACD/KBCD.

In January 1997, Liberman switched the AM and FM services, making the FM a Spanish-language station and the AM aimed at Vietnamese-Americans. While Liberman has three FM stations in the Los Angeles market playing contemporary Regional Mexican music, KWIZ specialized in classic Mexican hits from past decades.

Previous logo

On January 1, 2023, the station dropped its Spanish ranchera oldies format as new owners flipped the station to Spanish Christian programming known as "Vision Latina 96.7". Since then, it has been operated by Universal Church under an LMA. Two months later on March 1, Universal Church made plans to purchase KWIZ outright from Estrella Media for $8 million. The purchase was consummated on May 16, 2023.
