= KRQB =

- San Jacinto, California; United States
- Broadcast area: Inland Empire
- Frequency: 96.1 MHz
- Branding: "Que Buena 96.1 FM"

Programming
- Format: Regional Mexican

Ownership
- Owner: MediaCo; (Estrella MediaCo LLC)
- Sister stations: KBUA, KBUE, KEBN, KVNR; TV: KRCA

History
- First air date: 1990
- Former call signs: KWRP (1989–2004); KWIE (2004–2007)
- Call sign meaning: Riverside Que Buena

Technical information
- Licensing authority: FCC
- Facility ID: 25809
- Class: A
- ERP: 1,400 watts
- HAAT: 209 meters (686 ft)
- Transmitter coordinates: 34.037°N 116.969°W

Links
- Public license information: Public file; LMS
- Webcast: Listen Live
- Website: quebuena961.com

KRQB (96.1 FM) is one of four Southern California radio stations branded as "Que Buena" and which all play Regional Mexican music. Its owner is MediaCo. KRQB shares the same weekday morning show, midday, afternoon and evening shows as the three Los Angeles-area Que Buena stations. KRQB is licensed to San Jacinto, California, and serves the Riverside-San Bernardino radio market.

KRQB has an effective radiated power (ERP) of 1,400 watts, as a Class A station. Its transmitter is off Pisgah Peak-Oak Glen Road in Yucaipa.

== History ==
In 1990, the station signed on as KWRP. It programmed an adult standards music format and was owned by the H.S.C. Radio Corporation. On January 22, 2003, the station made a switch, airing Regional Mexican music under the branding of "Fiesta Mexicana." It later re-branded to "Ranchera 96.1" on February 25, 2003.

Over the next couple of years, the station evolved into hurban music, changing its call sign to KWIE, known as "Wild 96.1." The playlist consisted of Hip-Hop/R&B and Reggaeton, and used the slogan Hip-Hop y más. In late 2006 KWIE changed to a Rhythmic Contemporary format. It kept the Hip-Hop and R&B music, but eliminated Reggaeton. As a result, the slogan changed from "Hip-hop y más" to "#1 for Hip-Hop." With the rhythmic contemporary format, KWIE competed with 99.1 KGGI, a rhythmic station also heard around the Inland Empire.

On July 19, 2007, the station was sold to Liberman Broadcasting Inc. for $25 million. When the deal closed, the callsign KWIE moved to 93.5 FM in Ontario, California (formerly under the call sign KDAI). That station simulcasts 93.5 KDAY in Redondo Beach. Liberman switched 96.1 to the call letters KRQB, representing Riverside Que Buena.

On August 1, 2007, KRQB launched the "Que Buena" Regional Mexican format in the Inland Empire. KRQB joined the trimulcast of the three Los Angeles-area stations (KEBN Garden Grove, KBUE Long Beach, and KBUA San Fernando) in broadcasting Don Cheto's popular morning show. The midday, PM drive, evening and weekend dayparts have a team of local, Inland Empire DJs, different than those heard on the LA trombo.
