= Los Angeles Daily News (19th century) =

American defunct print publication

The first ever Los Angeles Daily News was a print publication by Los Angeles–based King & Offutt company.

The newspaper began publishing in 1869 and continuing for a number of years after. Volume 1, No. 1 was on January 1, 1869. The last publication date is not known.

== See also ==
- Los Angeles Daily News (1923–1954) founded in 1923 as Illustrated Daily News
- Los Angeles Daily News, published currently starting 1911 as the Van Nuys Call
