= HPS Investment Partners =

American credit investment firm

HPS Investment Partners, LLC
- Formerly: Highbridge Principal Strategies
- Type: Subsidiary
- Industry: Investment management
- Founded: 2007; 19 years ago
- Founders: Scott Kapnick; Scot French; Michael Patterson
- Headquarters: New York City, U.S.
- Number of locations: 14
- Area served: United States, Europe, the Middle East and Asia-Pacific
- Key people: Scott Kapnick (CEO)
- Products: Private credit Private equity Mezzanine capital Real assets Public credit
- AUM: US$201 billion (September 2026)
- Number of employees: 760 (2024)
- Parent: BlackRock
- Website: hpspartners.com

HPS Investment Partners, LLC (HPS) is an American investment firm headquartered in New York City. The firm focuses on investments in private credit, public credit, private equity and real assets. In 2025, HPS was ranked by Private Debt Investor as the second largest private debt investment company based on total fundraising over the most recent five-year period. In 2025, HPS became a subsidiary of BlackRock.

== History ==
In 2007, Scott Kapnick, Scot French and Michael Patterson founded Highbridge Principal Strategies after leaving Goldman Sachs. It was formed as the private equity and credit investment division of Highbridge Capital Management (Highbridge) within J.P. Morgan Asset Management. Its strategies included mezzanine capital, bonds, direct lending and growth capital.

In 2009, due to the 2008 financial crisis, many hedge funds received redemption requests. However, Highbridge Principal Strategies grew significantly during this period.

In February 2011, Highbridge Principal Strategies was expanded after Highbridge acquired Gávea Investimentos and had let go of its event-driven trading team.

In December 2014, Institutional Investor reported that Kapnick and the management team of Highbridge were in discussions with JPMorgan Chase to lead a management buyout of the firm. The talks were focused mostly on Highbridge Principal Strategies. One of the main reasons for the buyout was the Volcker Rule which put strict limits on how much banks can invest in alternative investments which would be detrimental to Highbridge. Another reason was how Highbridge staff were compensated with bank stock which put the firm at a disadvantage when hiring and retaining staff compared to privately held hedge funds since the bank was a highly regulated entity. Finally, Jes Staley who headed J.P. Morgan Asset Management and was instrumental in Highbridge's acquisition back in 2004 had left the firm in 2013 and was replaced by Mary Callahan Erdoes. In fact by this period, Highbridge co-founders Glenn Dubin and Henry Swieca and former Highbridge President Todd Builione had all left Highbridge.

By 2015, Highbridge Principal Strategies became the larger more dominant part of Highbridge due to its performance and popularity among investors. It managed $22 billion in assets under management while the hedge fund side managed $6 billion. It was one of Highbridge's most successful ventures.

In October 2015, it was reported that only Highbridge Principal Strategies would be separating from JPMorgan Chase. JPMorgan Chase would keep the Highbridge and its hedge funds operations as well as a minority stake of Highbridge Principal Strategies. In March 2016, the buyout was completed from Highbridge and JPMorgan Chase. This led to an independent firm being spun out as HPS Investment Partners.

In July 2018, Dyal Capital acquired a minority investment in HPS.

In 2019, HPS took over LBI Media following LBI's Chapter 11 bankruptcy protection filing with the United States Bankruptcy Court for the District of Delaware.

In April 2023, it was reported that HPS had almost $100 billion in assets under management after it had raised $12 billion for a new junior credit fund. In December, HPS confidentially filed for an initial public offering.

In December 2024, it was announced that BlackRock will acquire HPS for $12 billion. Following the acquisition, the company will operate under a new, combined private credit unit with $220 billion of client assets under management. As part of the deal, the company’s leadership team will retain their positions in the new business.

In July 2025, BlackRock completed the acquisition of HPS.

== Legal actions ==
On August 17, 2020, Citigroup filed a lawsuit against HPS, Brigade Capital and Symphony Asset Management, seeking to return their share of $504 million from a near $900 million payment that Citi said it paid by mistake to Revlon's lenders. The payments were related to loans made to Revlon by various private lenders which included the three firms. The lenders took the position that they were not obligated to return the money. On February 16, 2021, a federal court ruled that the lenders were under no obligation to return any of the monies mistakenly received. Despite this ruling, Citigroup asked the United States Court of Appeals for the Second Circuit for an appeal and, on September 8, 2022, the court ruled in favour of Citigroup reversing the 2021 ruling. The lenders then requested an appeal but were denied by the court on October 12, 2022.

In June 2023, Jacob Chetrit sued HPS over 850 Third Avenue, claiming the firm filed a fraudulent deed. Chetrit claimed that when he handed over the property to HPS, he signed a deed showing the balance on the loans to be $320 million. HPS allegedly created a separate deed showing a balance of only $266 million. The reduced loan amount allowed HPS to charge Chetrit more for other expenses like an exit fee and interest costs.
