= KRCA =

Television station in Riverside, California

- Riverside–Los Angeles, California; United States
- City: Riverside, California
- Channels: Digital: 7 (VHF), shared with KABC-TV; Virtual: 62
- Branding: Estrella TV KRCA 62

Programming
- Affiliations: 62.1: Estrella TV; for others, see § Subchannels

Ownership
- Owner: MediaCo; (Estrella Television License LLC)

History
- First air date: March 20, 1989
- Former call signs: KSLD (1989–1990)
- Former channel numbers: Analog: 62 (UHF, 1989–2009); Digital: 68 (UHF, until 2009), 35 (UHF, 2009–2018)
- Former affiliations: Asian Independent (1989–1990); HSN (1990–1998); Spanish Independent (1998–2009)
- Call sign meaning: Riverside, California (no relation to the Radio Corporation of America)

Technical information
- Licensing authority: FCC
- Facility ID: 22161
- ERP: 28.7 kW; 50 kW (CP)
- HAAT: 978 m (3,209 ft)
- Transmitter coordinates: 34°13′37″N 118°4′1″W
- Translator(s): K30QC-D Ridgecrest

Links
- Public license information: Public file; LMS
- Website: www.estrellatv.com

KRCA (channel 62) is a television station licensed to Riverside, California, United States, broadcasting the Spanish-language Estrella TV network to the Los Angeles area. It is the flagship television property of Burbank-based MediaCo. The station's studios are located on North Victory Drive (near Interstate 5) in Burbank. Through a channel sharing agreement with KABC-TV (channel 7), KRCA transmits using KABC-TV's spectrum from an antenna atop Mount Wilson. Despite Riverside being KRCA's city of license, the station maintains no physical presence there.

== History ==
The station signed on March 20, 1989, as KSLD on UHF channel 62, displacing a low-power translator of San Bernardino–based PBS member station KVCR-TV (channel 24). The station was owned by Sunland Broadcasting; it was the first new Southern California TV station since channel 46 had returned in 1984. Channel 62 was intended to be the third Spanish-language TV outlet in the Southland, but an inability to secure enough programming prompted the station to emerge instead with home shopping programming from Home Shopping Network. The reason that KSLD-TV could not secure the programming was the collapse of Transvision, a proposed network of which channel 62 would have been the Los Angeles affiliate; the network opted to delay its launch.

In 1990, Sunland sold KSLD to Fouce Amusement Enterprises, for $3.575 million. Fouce changed the call letters to KRCA and began broadcasting Asian-language programming, as well as fare in Armenian and Persian. In 1997, KRCA was sold for $60 million to Liberman Broadcasting (which was renamed Estrella Media in February 2020, following a corporate reorganization of the company under private equity firm HPS Investment Partners, LLC). Liberman, which owned several Spanish-language radio stations in southern California, converted KRCA into a Spanish-language independent station.

In May 2005, KRCA was the subject of controversy due to billboards advertising its local newscasts, in which the place name "Los Angeles, CA" had the "CA" postal abbreviation crossed out, replaced with the word "MEXICO" in bold red and a picture of the El Ángel victory column on the Paseo de la Reforma superimposed onto a picture of the Los Angeles skyline. The billboard was deemed provocative by some, and protests erupted outside Liberman Broadcasting studios. California Governor Arnold Schwarzenegger spoke on the popular John and Ken radio talk show on KFI requesting that the Libermans remove the signs. After negotiations between the station and Clear Channel Outdoor (a company that shared common ownership with KFI at the time), the owner of the billboards, the messages were replaced with a more generic advertisement.

== News operation ==
KRCA presently broadcasts 7 1/2 hours of locally produced newscasts each week (with 1 1/2 hours each weekday) and no newscasts on weekends. On March 1, 2022, Estrella TV laid off most of its staff for KRCA's news operation outside a few remaining multimedia journalists, and all of its newscasts are produced and anchored by Canal 6 and Milenio TV personnel from Monterrey, Mexico; Canal 6/Milenio also produced KWHY-TV's newscasts from 2017 to 2024.

== Technical information ==
=== Subchannels ===
Subchannels of KABC-TV and KRCA
License	Subchannel	Res.	Short name	Programming
KABC-TV	7.1	720p	KABC-DT	ABC
KABC-TV	7.2	480i	LOCLish	Localish
KABC-TV	7.3	480i	CHARGE!	Charge!
KABC-TV	7.4	480i	QVC2	QVC2
KRCA	62.1	720p	KRCA-DT	Estrella TV
KRCA	62.2	480i	KRCA-2	Estrella News
KRCA	62.3	480i	CONFESS	Confess

=== Analog-to-digital conversion ===
Both the analog and pre-transition allocations for KRCA were outside the core spectrum (channels 2–51) permitted for broadcasting use after the transition; as a result, the station was required to find an in-core channel from which to operate its digital signal post-transition. It originally elected to operate on UHF channel 45 after 2009, but, anticipating difficulty getting coordination from Mexico to use that channel, it instead requested and was granted the use of UHF channel 35.

KRCA shut down its analog signal, over UHF channel 62, on June 12, 2009, as part of the federally mandated transition from analog to digital television. The station's digital signal relocated from its pre-transition UHF channel 68 to channel 35 (formerly the pre-transition digital signal of KMEX-DT), using virtual channel 62.
