= International versions of Family Feud =

The following article details examples of the game show Family Feud, originally aired in the United States on ABC and CBS and in syndication, elsewhere in the world. Most international versions are produced or distributed by Fremantle (who currently owns rights to formats developed by Mark Goodson Productions).

== International versions ==
Airing
Not airing
Upcoming

Country	Local name	Host(s)	Network	Air dates
Afghanistan (Dari)	رو در رو; Ro Dar Ro	Qasim Ibrahimi	Tolo TV	June 25, 2017 – present
Africa Françafrique	Une Famille en or	Patrick Charferry	Canal+ Afrique	December 4, 2023 – present
Algeria	فاملتنا; Familetna	Mehdi Adjaout	Télévision Algérienne; A3; Canal Algérie	October 26, 2014 – 2018
Algeria	فاملتنا; Familetna	Mehdi Adjaout	Echorouk TV	October 27, 2021 – present
Argentina	100 argentinos dicen	Monchi Balestra	El Trece	July 26, 2004 – February 3, 2006
Argentina	100 argentinos dicen	Darío Barassi; Monchi Balestra (2021)	El Trece	August 24, 2020 – January 3, 2023
Argentina	100 argentinos dicen	José María Listorti	El Trece	June 10 – November 1, 2024
Armenia	100 տարբերակ 100 Tarberak	Hrant Tokhatyan	Armenia 1	May 6, 2006 – December 31, 2007
Australia	Family Feud Australia	Tony Barber	Nine Network	February 20, 1978 – July 11, 1980
Australia	Family Feud Australia	Daryl Somers	Nine Network	July 14, 1980 – November 10, 1984
Australia	Family Feud Australia	Sandy Scott	Nine Network	February 13 – March 30, 1984
Australia	Family Feud Australia	Rob Brough	Seven Network	1990–1995
Australia	Family Feud Australia	John Deeks	Seven Network	January 29 – June 28, 1996
Australia	Celebrity Family Feud Australia	Rob Brough	Seven Network	1990–1991
Australia	Team Family Feud Australia	Rob Brough	Seven Network	1990s
Australia	Bert's Family Feud	Bert Newton	Nine Network	February 13, 2006 – June 1, 2007
Australia	Family Feud Australia	Grant Denyer	Network Ten	July 14, 2014 – July 22, 2018
Australia	Family Feud Australia	Grant Denyer	Network Ten	August 16 – December 27, 2020
Australia	All Star Family Feud	Grant Denyer	Network Ten	March 14, 2016 – May 6, 2018
Australia	Family Feud: The Podcast	Peter Helliar	ARN	July 13, 2022 – present
Azerbaijan	Tap dostum	Rahim Rahimli; Mushfiq Shahverdiyev; Rahman Rasulov	Lider TV	2008–2014
Azerbaijan	Söz gəlsin	Mushfiq Shahverdiyev	Xəzər TV	September 25 – December 25, 2017
Azerbaijan	Camaat nə deyir?	Agha Nadirov	İctimai TV	2021–present
Bangladesh	Family Feud Bangladesh	Tahsan Rahman Khan	NTV; Bongo	January 27, 2025 – present
Belgium (in Dutch)	Familieraad	Koen Wauters	vtm	1990–1994
Belgium (in Dutch)	Familieraad	Jo de Poorter	vtm	2005–2006
Belgium (in Dutch)	Familieraad	Chris Van den Durpel	vtm	June 30 – August 22, 2014
Belgium (in Dutch)	Familieraad	Inge Moerenhout	VT4	2002–2003
Bolivia	100 Bolivianos Dicen	Ronico Cuéllar	Red Uno	2023–present
Bolivia	100 Bolivianos Dicen Famosos	Ronico Cuéllar	Red Uno	2023–present
Botswana	Family Feud Botswana	Steve Harvey	Botswana Television	February 9, 2025 – present
Brazil	Jogo das Familias	Silvio Santos	Rede Tupi	1979
Brazil	Jogo das Familias	Silvio Santos	SBT	1984
Brazil	Family Feud	Silvio Santos	SBT	2005–2006
Brazil	Familionária	Jonas Bloch	TV Bandeirantes	1980s
Brazil	Tem Ou Não Tem	Luciano Huck	TV Globo	2020–2021
Brazil	Tem Ou Não Tem	Marcos Mion	TV Globo	2021–present
Bulgaria	Ceмейни войни Semeĭni Voĭni	Dian Machev	Nova TV	2002–2005
Bulgaria	Ceмейни войни Semeĭni Voĭni	Tsvetomir Ivanov	Nova TV	February 1, 2016 – present
Cambodia	Family Feud Cambodia	Pen Chamrong	PNN	2019–2021
Canada	La Guerre des clans (French)	Luc Senay	TQS	August 31, 1992 – May 23, 1997
Canada	La Guerre des clans (French)	Jean-François Baril	V	August 31, 2009 – 2017
Canada	La Guerre des clans (French)	Jean-François Breau	V	September 17, 2018 – 2019
Canada	Family Feud Canada (English)	Gerry Dee	CBC	December 16, 2019 – present
Chile	Desafío Familiar	Jorge Aedo	TVN	1993–1994
Chile	¡Qué dice Chile!	Martín Cárcamo	Canal 13	August 16, 2021 – present
Chile	¡Qué dice Chile! Celebrity ¡Qué dice Chile! Prime	Martín Cárcamo	Canal 13	2022–present
China	家庭赛乐赛; Jiātíng Sài Lè Sài	Lin Hai	Dragon TV	April – October 2010
China	家庭赛乐赛; Jiātíng Sài Lè Sài	Ying Da	Dragon TV	October 2010 – January 2011
Colombia	100 Colombianos Dicen	Carlos Calero	Caracol TV	2002–2005
Colombia	100 Colombianos Dicen	Marcelo Cezán	Caracol TV	April 22 – November 18, 2017
Croatia	Pet na pet	Davor Dretar	RTL Televizija	2014–2016
Croatia	Pet na pet	Daniel Bilić	RTL Televizija	2018
Czech Republic	5 proti 5	Petr Novotny	Prima	2006–2008
Czech Republic	5 proti 5	Petr Lesák	Prima	2008–2009
Czech Republic	Co na to Češi	Tomáš Matonoha	TV Nova	2016–2021
Ecuador	100 Ecuatorianos Dijeron	Gustavo Navarro	Canal Uno	2004–2005
Ecuador	100 Ecuatorianos Dicen	Ronald Farina	Teleamazonas	2023–present
Estonia	Rooside Sõda	Kristjan Jõekalda	TV3	2005–2007
Estonia	Rooside Sõda	Kristjan Jõekalda	TV3	2026–present
Estonia	Rooside Sõda	Kristjan Jõekalda	Kanal 2	2008–2011
Estonia	Suur Lotokolmapӓev – Rooside Sõda	Kristjan Jõekalda	Kanal 2	2012–2019
Estonia	Suur Lotokolmapӓev – Rooside Sõda	Kristjan Jõekalda	TV3	2019–2025
Ethiopia	የቤተሰብ ጨዋታ; Yebeteseb Chewata	Netsanet Workenegh	EBS TV	2017–present
Finland	Voitto kotiin	Nicke Lignell	Nelonen	September 6, 1999 – June 24, 2002
France	Une Famille en or	Patrick Roy	TF1	July 9, 1990 – 1992
France	Une Famille en or	Bernard Montiel	TF1	1992–1993
France	Une Famille en or	Laurent Cabrol	TF1	September 1993 – 1997
France	Une Famille en or	Bernard Montiel	TF1	1997–1998
France	Une Famille en or	Pascal Brunner	TF1	1998–1999
France	Une Famille en or	Christophe Dechavanne	TF1	2007–2014
France	Une Famille en or	Arnaud Tsamère	TMC	July 13 – December 22, 2015
France	Une Famille en or	Camille Combal	TF1	2021–present
France	Des Copains en or	Alexandre Delpérier	TF1	1995–1997
France	Family Battle	Cyril Hanouna	C8	September 22 – November 10, 2017
France	Family Battle	Benjamin Castaldi	C8	November 24, 2017
Germany	Familien-Duell	Werner Schulze-Erdel	RTL	January 26, 1992 – October 10, 2003
Germany	Familien-Duell	Inka Bause	RTLplus	2016–2018
Germany	5 gegen 5	Oliver Petszokat	RTL II	2006
Germany	Familien-Duell – Prominenten-Special	Daniel Hartwich	RTL	2013–2014
Ghana	Family Feud Ghana	Steve Harvey	TV3 Ghana	April 5, 2020 – present
Greece	Κόντρες; Kondres	Vlassis Bonatsos	Mega Channel	1991–1995
Greece	Κόντρα Πλακέ; Kontra Plake	Spyros Papadopoulos	Mega Channel	1995–2000
Greece	Fast Money!	Markos Seferlis	ANT1	2012
Greece	Άκου Τι Είπαν! Βραδιάτικα; Akou Ti Eipan! Vradiatika	Christos Ferentinos	Alpha TV	2014–2016
Greece	Άκου Τι Είπαν! Akou Ti Eipan!	Christos Ferentinos	Alpha TV	2014–2016
Greece	5X5; 5X5 Celebrity	Markos Seferlis	ANT1	2021–2022
Greece	5X5; 5X5 Celebrity	Thanos Kiousis	ANT1	2023–present
Hong Kong	思家大戰; Family Feud	Johnson Lee	TVB Jade	August 29, 2021 – present
Hungary	4N4LN – A családi játszma	Balázs Sebestyén	RTL Klub	March 3, 2014 – 2015
Hungary	Ütős ötös	Attila Till	TV2	April 3 – May 5, 2023
India	Family Fortunes	Roshan Abbas	Star Plus	1997–2000
India	Family Fortunes	RJ Mantra	Big Magic	2015–2016
India	MasterCard Family Fortunes	Roshan Abbas	Star Plus	2003
India	Family Full House	Rohit Sharma	Sony Entertainment Television	September 19, 2026 – present
India (Tamil)	(Arokya Presents) Jackpot	Khushbu	Jaya TV	2002–2010
India (Tamil)	(Arokya Presents) Jackpot	Nadhiya	Jaya TV	2010
India (Tamil)	(Arokya Presents) Jackpot	Simran	Jaya TV	2010–2013
India (Telugu)	Family Dhamaka	Vishwak Sen	aha	2023
Indonesia	Famili 100	Sonny Tulung	ANteve	October 16, 1995 – 3 April, 1999
Indonesia	Famili 100	Sonny Tulung	Indosiar	1999–2004
Indonesia	Famili 100	Sonny Tulung	TV7	2004–2005
Indonesia	Super Family	Darius Sinathrya	antv	2009–2011
Indonesia	New Famili 100	Tukul Arwana	Indosiar	2013–2015
Indonesia	Super Family 100	Eko Patrio	antv	2016
Indonesia	Super Family 100	Eko Patrio	tvOne	2017
Indonesia	Super Family 100	Gilang Dirga	GTV	2021
Indonesia	Family 100 Indonesia	Ananda Omesh	GTV	2017–2018
Indonesia	Family 100 Indonesia	Ananda Omesh	GTV	2019
Indonesia	Family 100	Irfan Hakim	MNCTV	2022–2025
Indonesia	New Family 100	Andhika Pratama	GTV	2025–2026
Indonesia	New Family 100	Irfan Hakim	GTV	2026
Indonesia	Famili 100 Bintang-Bintang	Sonny Tulung	ANTV	1997–1999
Indonesia	Famili 100 Bintang-Bintang	Sonny Tulung	Indosiar	1999–2004
Indonesia	Famili 100 Bintang-Bintang	Sonny Tulung	TV7	2004–2005
Indonesia	Famili 100 Keluarga Bintang	Sonny Tulung	Indosiar	2000–2004
Iraq	عائلتي تربح; Aelati Tarbah	Jawad Al-Shukurji	MBC Iraq	2019–present
Iraq	Pirs100	Arî Xurşîd	AVA Entertainment	2019–present
Ireland	Alan Hughes' Family Fortunes	Alan Hughes	TV3	February 18, 2012 – March 24, 2014
Israel	טוטו משפחתי; Toto Mishpahti	Dudu Topaz; Tzipi Shavit	Channel 3	1992–1995
Italy	Tuttinfamiglia	Claudio Lippi	Canale 5	November 12, 1984 – 1987
Italy	Tuttinfamiglia	Lino Toffolo	Canale 5	1987 – June 24, 1989
Italy	Tutti x Uno	Mike Bongiorno	Canale 5	October 8, 1992 – December 30, 1993
Italy	Famiglie d'Italia	Flavio Insinna	La7	October 7, 2024 – April 3, 2025
Japan	クイズ100人に聞きました; Quiz 100nin ni kikimashita	Hiroshi Sekiguchi	TBS	April 2, 1979 – September 28, 1992
Kazakhstan	Битва умов Bitva umov	David Orbeliany	Khabar	August 31, 2013 – January 12, 2014
Kazakhstan	Тапқыр отбасы Tapqyr otbasy	Nurdaulet Shertim	Qazaqstan	August 4 – September 26, 2025
Kuwait	نزاع عائلتي; Nizae Aelati	Fawzi Abdel Rasul Al-Majadi	MBC Kuwait	2018–present
Latvia	Zelta ģimene	Raimonds Bergmanis	LNT	2006–2008
Lebanon	كل ميلة عيلة; Kel mayle aile	Samer El Gharib	MTV	1997–2002
Lebanon	كل ميلة عيلة; Kel mayle aile	Michel Abou Sleiman	MTV	May 27, 2017 – May 15, 2018
Libya	العيلة هذا جوها; El Eila Hadha Jawha	Ahmed Kaib	Salam TV	2021–present
Lithuania	Šeimų dvikova – Akropolio turnyras	Vytenis Sinkevičius	Lietuvos ryto TV	2009–2012
Lithuania	Ant Liežuvio Galo	Radistai Jonas Nainys; Rolandas Mackevičius	BTV	2016
Lithuania	Spėk ir Atspėk	Žygimantas Gečas	LRT	September 1, 2025 – present
Luxembourg	Famillenduell	Dan Spogen	RTL Télé Lëtzebuerg	2018–present
Malaysia	Famili Ceria	Chef Wan	TV3	1996–1998
Malaysia	Famili Ceria	Helmi Gimmick	NTV7	1998–2005
Malaysia	Famili Ceria	Helmi Gimmick	NTV7	2009
Malaysia	Family Feud Malaysia (Malay)	Nabil Ahmad	Astro Ria	2023–present
Malaysia	Celebrity Family Feud Malaysia	Nabil Ahmad	Astro Ria	2023–present
Malaysia	பேமிலி பியூட்டி மலேஷியா தமிழ் Family Feud Malaysia (Tamil)	Dr. J. Ram	Astro Vinmeen	2023–present
Malaysia	Family Feud Malaysia (English)	Douglas Lim	PRIMEtime (now Astro Showcase)	2023–present
Malaysia	A咖赢家; Family Feud Malaysia (Chinese/CNY Special)	Jack Lim	Astro AEC	2024
Malta	Family Feud Malta	Ben Camille	TVM	October 6, 2024 – present
Mexico	100 mexicanos dijeron	Marco Antonio Regil	Canal de las Estrellas	2001–2005
Mexico	100 mexicanos dijeron VIP	Marco Antonio Regil	Canal de las Estrellas	2004–2005
Mexico	100 mexicanos dijeron	Adrián "El Vitor" Uribe	Televisa	2009–2019
Mexico	100 mexicanos	El "Capi" Pérez	Azteca Uno	2024–present
Moldova	100 de moldoveni au zis	Nicu Țărnă	Prime	2013–2014
Moldova	100 de moldoveni au zis	Mircea Marco	Prime	2017–2019
Moldova	100 de moldoveni au zis	Lilia Ojovan	Prime	2020–2022
Mongolia	Гэр бүлийн тулаан Ger büliin tulaan		TV2	2018
Mongolia	Family Feud Mongolia	Nyambayar Renchinjugder	Star TV	December 25, 2023 – present
Myanmar	မိသားစုပြိုင်ပွဲ Mitharsu pying pwel	Kaung Htet Zaw	Channel 7	January 30, 2016 – present
Netherlands	Vijf tegen Vijf	Willem Ruis	VARA	October 1, 1982 – 1986
Netherlands	Vijf tegen Vijf	Peter-Jan Rens	VARA	1992–1993
Netherlands	Vijf tegen Vijf	Peter-Jan Rens	RTL4	1993–1998
Netherlands	Vijf tegen Vijf	Gordon; Winston Gerschatanowitz (2006)	Talpa TV/Tien	2005–2006
Netherlands	Vijf tegen Vijf	Carlo Boszhard	Talpa TV/Tien	2009
Netherlands	Vijf tegen Vijf	Ruben Nicolai	RTL4	2015
Netherlands	Vijf tegen Vijf	Gordon	SBS6	2021 – July 29, 2022
New Zealand	Family Feud	Dai Henwood	TV3/Three	February 15, 2016 – November 27, 2017
New Zealand	All Star Family Feud	Dai Henwood	TV3/Three	2016
Nicaragua	¿Qué Dice Mi Gente?	Luis Báez	VOSTV/Canal 14	2014–present
Nigeria	Family Feud Nigeria	Bisola Aiyeola	DStv; Africa Magic Family; Africa Magic Urban	2022–present
Norway	Familieduellen	Klaus Sonstad	TV2	March 9 – November 30, 2019
Panama	100 Panameños Dicen	Rolando Sterling	TVN	2006
Paraguay	100 paraguayos dicen	Dani Da Rosa	Trece	June 20, 2022 – present
Peru	Desafio Familiar	Ricardo Belmont; Aldo Canziani; Estrella Amprimo	RBC Televisión	1987–1988
Peru	100 Peruanos Dicen	Bruno Pinasco	América Televisión	March 24 – October 13, 2013
Peru	Mi gente dice	Paco Bazán	ATV	2019
Philippines	Family Feud Philippines	Ogie Alcasid	ABC/TV5	November 19, 2001 – December 28, 2002
Philippines	Family Feud Philippines	Richard Gomez	GMA Network	October 13, 2008 – April 17, 2009
Philippines	Family Feud Philippines	Dingdong Dantes	GMA Network	October 19, 2009 – April 16, 2010
Philippines	Family Feud Philippines	Luis Manzano	ABS-CBN	April 9, 2016 – May 7, 2017
Philippines	Family Feud Philippines	Dingdong Dantes	GMA Network	March 21, 2022 – present
Philippines	Family Feud: The Showdown Edition	Edu Manzano	GMA Network	April 11 – July 1, 2011
Poland	Familiada	Karol Strasburger	TVP2	September 17, 1994 – present
Portugal	Entre Famílias	Fialho Gouveia	RTP1	1992–1994
Portugal	Em Família com Fernando Mendes	Fernando Mendes	RTP1	2006
Portugal	Family Feud – Tudo em Família	César Mourão	SIC	March 1, 2025 – June 28, 2026
Romania	FamiliaDA	Cosmin Seleși	Antena 1	2012–2014
Romania	Ce spun românii	Cabral Ibacka	Pro TV	July 27, 2015 – present
Russia	Сто к одному Sto k odnomu (Note: Since 2026, the show airs without Fremantle's involvement in the production.)	Alexander Gurevich (1995–2022); Alexander Akopov (2022–present)	NTV	January 8, 1995 – December 30, 1996
Russia	Сто к одному Sto k odnomu	Alexander Gurevich (1995–2022); Alexander Akopov (2022–present)	MTK	January 11 – June 7, 1997
Russia	Сто к одному Sto k odnomu	Alexander Gurevich (1995–2022); Alexander Akopov (2022–present)	TV Centre	June 14, 1997 – September 20, 1998
Russia	Сто к одному Sto k odnomu	Alexander Gurevich (1995–2022); Alexander Akopov (2022–present)	Russia 1	October 10, 1998 – present
Saudi Arabia	تحدي العائلات; Tahadi Al-Aelat	Dawood Al-Sherian	MBC1; MBC5; MBC Masr	2020–present
Serbia	Familijada	Aleksandar Srećković Kubura	TV Avala	2008–2009
Serbia	Porodični obračun	Miroslav Miki Dujović	RTV Pink	2011–2012
Serbia	100 ljudi, 100 ćudi	Anđelka Prpić	TV Prva	April 2, 2018 – June 21, 2019
Singapore	满堂欢笑一家亲; All In A Family	Chen Shucheng	SBC 8	January 26 – April 20, 1986
Slovakia	5 proti 5	Andrej Bičan	Jednotka	2007–2009
Slovakia	5 proti 5	Andrej Bičan	TV JOJ	2010
Slovakia	5 proti 5	Andrej Bičan	Jednotka	September 2011 – May 2022
Slovakia	5 proti 5	Andy Kraus	Jednotka	2026–present
Slovenia	Družinski dvoboj	Vesna Malnar	TV3	2007–2010
Slovenia	Družinski dvoboj	Žan Papič	Planet TV	2022
Slovenia	Kdo bo koga?	Aljoša Ternovšek	Planet TV	2013–2014
South Africa	Family Feud Africa	Steve Harvey	e.tv	April 5, 2020 – present
Spain	Todo queda en casa	Pedro Osinaga	TVE1	June 2, 1986 – February 11, 1987
Spain	¿Cómo lo veis?	Joaquín Prat	TVE1	1994–1995
Spain	¡Vaya peña!	Carlos Lozano	TVE1	June 5, 2001
Spain	Family Feud: La batalla de los famosos	Nuria Roca	Antena 3	July 30 – September 10, 2021
Sweden	Fråga Släkten	Ingvar Oldsberg	TV1	1985
Sweden	Familjefejden	Benny Borg	TV3	1991–1993
Sweden	Släktslaget	Ingvar Oldsberg	SVT2	2000
Switzerland	5 Gegen 5	Sven Epiney	SF 1	2005–2012
Taiwan	大家一起來; Dàjiā yīqǐ lái	Zhào Shùhǎi	CTV	September 19, 1983 – July 4, 1988
Thailand	4 ต่อ 4 ซันเด; 4 vs 4 Sunday	Kanit Sarasin	Channel 3	2003–2006
Thailand	4 ต่อ 4 ฮอลิเดย์ 4 vs 4 Holiday	Kanit Sarasin	Channel 3	2003–2004
Thailand	4 ต่อ 4 แฟมิลี่เกม; 4 vs 4 Family Game	Kanit Sarasin	Channel 3	January 13, 2001 – December 31, 2006
Thailand	4 ต่อ 4 แฟมิลี่เกม; 4 vs 4 Family Game	Kitti Cheawwongkul	ONE HD	March 7, 2016 – December 21, 2017
Thailand	4 ต่อ 4 แฟมิลี่เกม; 4 vs 4 Family Game	Kitti Cheawwongkul	ONE HD	July 7, 2018 – December 28, 2025
Thailand	4 ต่อ 4 เซเลบริตี้ 4 vs 4 Celebrity	Kitti Cheawwongkul	ONE HD	March 12, 2016 – November 23, 2025
Thailand	4 ต่อ 4 ฟรายเดย์ 4 vs 4 Friday	Kitti Cheawwongkul	ONE HD	February 10 – December 22, 2017
Thailand	4 ต่อ 4 ออลสตาร์แชริตี้ 4 vs 4 All Star Charity	Kitti Cheawwongkul	ONE HD	January 15 – February 26, 2017
Thailand	4 ต่อ 4 ออลสตาร์แชริตี้ 4 vs 4 All Star Charity	Kitti Cheawwongkul	ONE HD	August 4 – September 1, 2018
Thailand	4 ต่อ 4 ปีจอ; 4 vs 4 2018	Kitti Cheawwongkul	ONE HD	January 8 – July 1, 2018
Tunisia	أحـنـا هـكـا; Ahna Hakka	Nizar Chaari	Tunis 7	2008–2010
Tunisia	ملا توانسة; Malla Twensa	Karim Gharbi	Elhiwar Ettounsi	2020–present
Turkey	Süper Aile	Erol Evgin	Show TV	1992–1994
Turkey	Süper Aile	Demet Akbağ	Kanal 1	2008
Turkey	Aileler Yarişiyor	Beyazıt Öztürk	Kanal D	1998–1999
Turkey	Aileler Yarişiyor	Beyazıt Öztürk	Star TV	2009
Turkey	Aileler Yarişiyor	Ufuk Özkan	TRT 1	2012–2014
Turkey	Aileler Yarişiyor	Erol Evgin; Gülben Ergen (guest); Burcu Esmersoy (guest); Atalay Demirci (guest); Alp Kirşan (guest); Jess Molho (guest)	TV8	2014
Turkey	Aileler Yarişiyor	Ufuk Özkan	TRT 1	2018–2020
Turkey	Aileler Yarişiyor	Asuman Krause	360	June 28, 2021 – June 29, 2025
Turkey	Birimiz Hepimiz Için	Mehmet Ali Erbil	Star TV	2009
Turkey	Aile Boyu	Çağla Şikel; Emre Altuğ	TRT 1	2010–2011
Turkey	100 Kişiye Sorduk	Atalay Demirci	TV8	2015
Ukraine	Просто шоу Prosto show	Yuriy Horbunov	1+1	February 4 – March 25, 2013
Ukraine	єПитання ePytannya	Lesia Nikitiuk	Novyi Kanal	March 13, 2023 – present
United Arab Emirates	احلى عيلة; Ahla Aile	Nayef El Naimi	Abu Dhabi TV	2011
United Arab Emirates	العائلة الأقوى; Al-Aela El-Aqwa	Ayman Qaissouni	Dubai TV	2019
United Kingdom	Family Fortunes	Bob Monkhouse	ITV	January 6, 1980 – June 24, 1983
United Kingdom	Family Fortunes	Max Bygraves	ITV	October 14, 1983 – May 31, 1985
United Kingdom	Family Fortunes	Les Dennis	ITV	June 27, 1987 – August 31, 2002
United Kingdom	Family Fortunes	Andy Collins	ITV	September 2 – December 6, 2002
United Kingdom	Family Fortunes	Gino D'Acampo	ITV	September 20, 2020 – June 4, 2023
United Kingdom	All Star Family Fortunes	Vernon Kay	ITV	October 28, 2006 – June 14, 2015
United States (in English)	Family Feud	Richard Dawson	ABC	July 12, 1976 – 1985
United States (in English)	Family Feud	Richard Dawson	Syndication	1977–1985
United States (in English)	All-Star Family Feud Special	Richard Dawson	ABC	May 8, 1978 – May 25, 1984
United States (in English)	Family Feud	Ray Combs	CBS	July 4, 1988 – 1992
United States (in English)	Family Feud	Ray Combs	Syndication	July 4, 1988 – 1992
United States (in English)	Family Feud Challenge	Ray Combs	CBS	1992 – March 26, 1993
United States (in English)	The New Family Feud	Ray Combs	Syndication	1992–1994
United States (in English)	Family Feud	Richard Dawson	Syndication	September 1994 – 1995
United States (in English)	Family Feud	Louie Anderson	Syndication	September 20, 1999 – 2002
United States (in English)	Family Feud	Richard Karn	Syndication	2002–2006
United States (in English)	Family Feud	John O'Hurley	Syndication	2006–2010
United States (in English)	Family Feud	Steve Harvey	Syndication	2010–present
United States (in English)	Celebrity Family Feud	Al Roker	NBC	June 24 – July 29, 2008
United States (in English)	Celebrity Family Feud	Steve Harvey	ABC	June 21, 2015 – present
United States (in Spanish)	¿Qué dice la gente?	Marco Antonio Regil (2006–2008); Omar Chaparro (2008)	TeleFutura	June 12, 2006 – November 14, 2008
United States (in Spanish)	¿Qué dice la gente? VIP	Marco Antonio Regil (2006–2008); Omar Chaparro (2008)	TeleFutura	June 12, 2006 – November 14, 2008
United States (in Spanish)	100 latinos dijeron	Marco Antonio Regil (2013–2016); Armando Hernández (2019); Mau Nieto (2019–present)	MundoFOX	September 9, 2013 – 2015
United States (in Spanish)	100 latinos dijeron	Marco Antonio Regil (2013–2016); Armando Hernández (2019); Mau Nieto (2019–present)	MundoMax	2015 – November 30, 2016
United States (in Spanish)	100 latinos dijeron	Marco Antonio Regil (2013–2016); Armando Hernández (2019); Mau Nieto (2019–present)	Estrella TV	February 19, 2019 – present
United States (in Spanish)	¿Qué dicen los famosos?	Rodrigo Vidal	Telemundo	October 2, 2022 – December 31, 2023
Uruguay	¿Qué dice la gente?	Humberto de Vargas	Saeta TV	2008
Uruguay	100 uruguayos dicen	Maximiliano de la Cruz	Teledoce	2021–2022
Uruguay	100 uruguayos dicen	Christian Font	Teledoce	2022–2023
Uruguay	100 uruguayos dicen	Lucía Rodríguez	Teledoce	October 26, 2026 – present
Uruguay	100 uruguayos dicen Junior	Pablo Turturiello	Teledoce	2024–2025
Uzbekistan	Beshga Besh	Shox Alimovich	FTV	August 1, 2026 – present
Venezuela	Qué dice la gente	Maite Delgado	Venevisión	2001–2002
Vietnam	Chung sức	Ta Minh Tam	HTV7	January 6, 2004 – December 27, 2011
Vietnam	Chung sức	Bình Minh	HTV7	2012–2014
Vietnam	Chung sức	Hari Won; Trường Giang	HTV7	2015
Vietnam	Chung sức	Đại Nghĩa; Lê Khánh	HTV7	June 28, 2016

== See also ==
- List of television show franchises
