= Trato Hecho (American game show) =

2005 game show

- Created by: Monty Hall
- Based on: Let's Make a Deal
- Presented by: Guillermo Huesca
- Announcer: Gustavo Vargas
- Countries of origin: Mexico; Spain

Production
- Running time: 25-30 min.

Original release
- Network: Univision
- Release: January 10 – December 9, 2005

Trato Hecho is the Spanish language version of the Let's Make a Deal. Its title translates to "Done Deal". The show was produced in Spain and in Mexico; in addition, a version was recently produced in Los Angeles, California for the Univision television network.

The show lasted from January 10 to December 9, 2005. The host for this version was Guillermo Huesca, with an uncredited model referred to solely as la bella Elizabeth ("the lovely Elizabeth", in English game show vernacular). In addition, several male actors, referred to as los Tratochicos ("the Deal Guys"), assisted with some deals and "modeled" some of the prizes and zonks, although they did not describe them, unlike English-language version announcers Jay Stewart (1963–76) and Jonathan Mangum (2009-present) who announced and "modeled" the Zonks.

== Gameplay of U.S. version ==
Gameplay proceeded in the exact manner as the English-speaking version, with the same wide range of deals. Contestants vied to improve their winnings without ending up with a Chasco ("letdown"), a foolish booby prize equivalent to the "Zonks" on Let's Make a Deal. Usually, a trade was completed with the idiom "Trato Hecho, jamás deshecho" ("A deal made is never broken.")

The budget for this version was quite small compared to the English-speaking version of the show. Few (if any) cars were offered, and the value of the Big Deal (El Gran Trato) usually ranged from $3,000 to $6,000. However, a few nighttime specials of Trato Hecho were produced with a much heftier budget; the Big Deal could be worth up to $26,000 or more on these episodes.

== American nexus ==
Trato Hecho ("Let's Make a Deal"), along with 100 mexicanos dijeron/100 mexicanos dijieron, ¿Qué dice la gente? & 100 latinos dijeron ("Family Feud"), are two classic 1970s game shows revived for Latin American audiences because of the close cultural connections with the US.
