= Trato Hecho =

Trato Hecho, Spanish for "Done deal" or "It's a deal", may refer to:

- Trato Hecho (U.S. game show), the Spanish language version of Let's Make a Deal in the United States
- Trato Hecho (Argentina), the Argentine version of Deal or No Deal
- Trato Hecho (Peru), the Peruvian version of Deal or No Deal
- Deal or No Deal (Chile), the Chilean version of Deal or No Deal, which originally used the Trato Hecho name
