= Minute to Win It =

International game show franchise

- Created by: Derek Banner (BUMP Productions). Mattias Olsson and Jock Millgårdh. Developed by Friday TV.
- Original work: Minute to Win It (American game show)
- Owner: Banijay Entertainment
- Years: 2010–present

Films and television
- Television series: Minute to Win It (see international versions)

Miscellaneous
- Genre: Game show
- First aired: March 14, 2010; 16 years ago

Minute to Win It is an international game show franchise where contestants take part in a series of 60-second challenges that use objects that are commonly available around the house. The first version of Minute to Win It to air was the American primetime game show, which premiered on NBC on March 14, 2010, and ran till 2011 with restaurateur and TV personality Guy Fieri as the host. It was revived in 2013 on GSN with host Apolo Ohno. The second network to air a version of the concept was Brazil's SBT, on April 17, 2010. This series was called Nada Além de um Minuto (Portuguese for Nothing But a Minute) and was played as part of the pre-existing program Programa Silvio Santos, hosted by Silvio Santos. Then on April 30, 2010, Germany's Sat.1 aired Die perfekte Minute (The perfect Minute) and on June 22, 2010, Australia's Seven Network aired Minute to Win It. Currently over fifty countries worldwide have produced a version of Minute to Win It.

The first two episodes of the American version played back-to-back at 7:00 pm Eastern and Pacific. On October 6, 2010, Minute to Win It was awarded the C21/Frapa Award for Best studio based game show format at the MIPCOM Television Festival in France. A card game, board game, and video game versions for the Wii, Kinect for Xbox 360 and Nintendo DS have been made for this show. The U.S. season two finale aired on September 7, 2011. On May 13, 2012, NBC announced that the English version of the show would not be renewed for a third season.

Minute to Win It aired new episodes on GSN Tuesday nights at 8/7c. The first season of GSN shows began in June 2013 and ended in October 2013; the second season premiered in February 2014 and ended in April 2014.

An American, Spanish language, nightly version of the game show, titled Minuto para Ganar (Minute To Win), debuted on MundoFox on the network's formal launch date of August 13, 2012, hosted by Marco Antonio Regil.

== Gameplay ==
=== United States format ===
==== Rules ====
"10 games, each 60 seconds. Playing using household items could win you one million dollars."

The contestant is presented with the blueprint for the first game (level) and must complete the game within 60 seconds to win the first level (was $1,000 in all versions) and advance to the next level. After completing the first, fifth, eighth, and sometimes ninth level games, the contestant is guaranteed to leave with no less than the cash award for those levels. If the contestant can complete the final game, the contestant will earn $1,000,000 ($100,000 in the Spanish version and $250,000 in the GSN version).

The contestant is given three "lives" at the beginning of the game. The difficulty of the games progressively increases throughout the show. If time expires or the conditions of the game cannot be fulfilled (such as by the contestant exhausting any allotted attempts or committing a foul such as by dropping certain objects on the floor), the contestant loses a "life". If the contestant loses all three of their "lives", the game ends and the contestant's winnings drop to the previous milestone they passed.

Some games require that the contestant let objects stand still for 3 seconds. If there are 3 or fewer seconds on the clock, the clock will stop at 1, the count will continue backstage, and the contestant will have completed the game if the objects stand still for 3 seconds. Sometimes games require a "power cam" replay to make sure the contestant completed the game within the time limit. Sometimes, the rule states that an object has to be released before time expires (Layin' Track, Tuna Roll), other times, the objective must be met first. If the contestant releases an object to stand still as time expires, a replay will check to see if the object was released in time (the 3-second count still happens but is usually not important).

After completing a game, the contestant can leave with the amount of money already won before seeing the blueprint for the next game. However, once the contestant elects for the game, the contestant cannot leave the show until that game is complete or they have exhausted all three of their "lives".

In the first part of season one in the English version, $50,000 was the only milestone; players who were eliminated from the game before completing the level five game left with nothing. The milestones at $1,000 and $250,000 were added in the second part of that season. Then, partway through season two, a milestone at $500,000 was added. For the MundoFox version, $1,000, $5,000, $50,000 and $75,000 are the milestones. In the GSN edition, the milestones are $1,000, $10,000 and $25,000.

In episodes featuring celebrity contestants competing for charities, all levels are milestones, so they get all the money up to their last successful level.

In episodes featuring teams of two contestants, some games are played by both players, while others are played solo. A player can only make three consecutive attempts at solo games (including re-attempts following losing a life; an intervening team game does not reset this count). After a player makes three attempts, the other player is forced to attempt the next solo game.

In Christmas episodes, two extra games were added for "the 12 games of Minute to Win It": the 11th game is worth $2,000,000 and the 12th is worth $3,000,000. In the Spanish version, the 11th game would be worth $150,000 and the 12th would be worth $250,000. Both are milestones.

Also in Christmas episodes, some games contain a "Holiday Bonus," in which a contestant wins a gift if the level is passed. A visual representation of the gift is placed inside of a box, which is opened if and when the level is completed. The gifts include:

- An extra life: Contestants who received this "gift" can have one more life than they already have.
- Extra 10 seconds: Contestants who received this "gift" can add an extra 10 seconds to one attempt of a game (including re-attempts, and in the case of a survival game, subtract 10 seconds).
- Prize: Contestants who received this gift won a bonus prize.

Some season two episodes feature similar bonuses known as a "Blueprint Bonus." However, the bonus is shown on a large monitor, and it is shown before the blueprint and the game is played. So far, the only bonuses won by contestants have been the extra life and extra ten seconds. When a contestant decides to use the extra ten seconds, a special 70 second clock is used, or if the contestant is playing a survival game (like Keep it Up, Defying Gravity, High as a Kite, Uphill Battle, etc.) the clock is reduced to 50 seconds. Besides, the outer floor lights of the 60-second circle do not turn red for the first ten seconds. For the survival games, the first ten lights are already red.

==== Variations ====
Head to head: Two teams of two players compete against each other in a best-of-seven match. Winning a challenge wins a point and the first team to four points wins $50,000 (milestone) and a chance to play for the million starting from Level 6 with three lives remaining. The challenges are all around the same difficulty, although some may be harder than others.

Last Man Standing: 10 players play against each other and the one with the worst result at the end of the challenge is eliminated. This continues until there is one player left. The winner wins $100,000 and plays Supercoin for a chance to win the million. The challenges still get progressively harder.

Summer Million-Dollar Mission (six episodes): One player from the audience is selected to play the million-dollar game Supercoin. This contestant was given one life to beat the challenge. They were also not given the information that it requires an almost perfect shot to get it in the water jug, which is the normal blueprint.

The first top prize was reached in Denmark. Only one contestant won $500,000 on the Australian Version; Grant Nelson walked away with $500,000 on 3 August 2010. Two teams won $500,000 on the U.S. version; Kimberly Fox and Aaron Hendrick walked away with $500,000 on July 21, 2010. This was prior to the change in rule that allowed contestants to bank on level 9, allowing them to play subsequent levels at no risk. After this rule was established, the Bishop family completed their level 9 challenge to bank $500,000 on February 2, 2011. The Bishops then went on to fail the Supercoin challenge. A man in Venezuela completed Supercoin. The winnings of these contestants listed on this paragraph are the biggest prizes in Minute to Win It franchise worldwide.

==== Prizes ====
Successfully completing a challenge is worth a specific cash prize at each level. Contestants who successfully complete stunts on levels with bolded amounts in the table below are guaranteed to leave with no less than the cash award at that level should they fail any later challenges.

Levels 11 and 12 were only played during Christmas episodes of the NBC and MundoFox version.

Level	Value (NBC)	Value (MundoFox)	Value (GSN)
1	**$1,000**		
2	$2,500	$2,000	
3	$5,000	$3,000	
4	$10,000	$4,000	$5,000
5	**$50,000**	**$5,000**	**$10,000**
6	$75,000	$10,000	$15,000
7	$125,000	$25,000	**$25,000**
8	**$250,000**	**$50,000**	$50,000
9	**$500,000**	**$75,000**	$100,000
**10**	**$1,000,000**	**$100,000**	**$250,000**
**11**	**$2,000,000**	**$150,000**	
**12**	**$3,000,000**	**$250,000**	

=== United Kingdom format ===
The UK version of the series used a different format from the United States primetime version. Each team (consisting of a captain (either Joe Swash or Caroline Flack) and five contestants of the captain's gender) competed in six games – either head-to-head or solo-play against the clock – to win points. The highest-scoring team after 6 games goes through to two games which make up the cash prize round. The first of these games built up the prize fund for every point scored, and the second determined whether or not they won the money. The maximum winnings a team could earn was £30,000. The main reason for this different format was that the show's sponsor was Cadbury, and their famous Spots v. Stripes campaign was happening around the time of the premiere, which had the slogan: "Let's play our way to London 2012."

Host Darren McMullen emphasised that each player could only play once in the first six games except for the team captains, who appeared twice; once for a solo game and once for a two-player game. Although not said on camera, Swash's team were the Spots, and Flack's team were the Stripes.

== Reception ==
In a pre-broadcast review, Cinema Blend's Kelly West praised Guy Fieri's "enthusiastic" performance and his ability to interact well with contestants. West also noted that the show could do well with families and viewers who have a preference to non-intellectual game shows, although the challenges were criticized for needing little to no skill to accomplish.

== Broadcast history ==
=== United States ===
The show premiered on March 14, 2010, and continued with new episodes through May 25, 2010. NBC later announced Minute to Win It would air new episodes during the summer, from Wednesday July 7, 2010 to Tuesday September 14, 2010. The new episodes would be labeled "The Summer of Minute to Win It".

On November 1, 2010, NBC announced that season two of Minute to Win It, would begin with three new holiday themed episodes starting on December 7, December 14, and December 21. Then on November 15, 2010, NBC announced that the second season of Minute to Win It would resume airing on January 5.

Those three shows featured older games, such as Defying Gravity and High Roller, newer games, like Floatacious and Hoop de Loop, never-before-seen games like A Bit Dicey and Mad Dog, and new twists on old games like Don't Blow the Kings, and Mag-Nutstacker. Season two also featured a summer run that began on June 8, 2011. NBC did not renew the show for a third season.

The new MundoFox Spanish-language network announced the first season of a weekday Spanish-language version (entitled Minuto Para Ganar), which was chronologically the third season of the show, and debuted on August 13, 2012. Marco Antonio Regil, who has hosted Mexican versions of well-known game shows and made the short list for auditions of a well-known game show in English, hosted that version. Executive Producer Adam Zuvich returned to the same role on the Spanish version, and Rich Brown, who oversaw the games on the original English version, also returned to the same role, and was listed as Co-Executive Producer. In February 2013, the Spanish version moved production to New York. In 2020, Telemundo aired reruns of the Spanish version.

On July 24, 2012, reruns of Minute to Win It began airing on GSN, and on January 31, 2013, they announced a new series of the English-language version with Apolo Ohno as the host. The first season premiered on June 25, 2013 (a full episode sneak preview was shown on May 23) and ended on October 29, 2013. The second season premiered on February 25, 2014, and ended on April 29, 2014. 40 episodes were produced for the GSN version.

The first season featured individuals, teams, celebrities, last-man-standing competitions, individual head-to-head competitions (one or three games), and a million dollar mission. The second season features teams, families (Bishop family and Canter family), celebrities, individual and team head-to-head competitions (seven games), former contestants with a second chance (Mark Staniec and Heather Baker), and former contestant redemption head-to-head (Lynn and Bethany Gerber vs. Heidi Billington and Donna Speakman).

As of 2022, the GSN version is available to stream on Pluto TV, while the MundoFox version is available on Tubi.

=== United Kingdom ===
The show first premiered on August 30, 2011, and aired on ITV2 for one eight-episode series.

=== Australia ===
The show first premiered on June 22, 2010, and aired on Seven Network for one ten-episode series, airing on a Tuesday Night timeslot.

== Top prize winners ==
Across the show's versions, 14 known cases of completing the final level and walking away with the top prize exist.

Country	Contestants	Prize	Final challenge	Date
Afghanistan	Unknown	AF1,000,000	Supercoin	June 20, 2014
Argentina	Facundo	AR$2,000,000	Ping Tac Toe	April 9, 2021
Denmark	Charlie	250,000Kr	Double Trouble	2011
Ecuador	Eduardo Hurtado	$10,000	Triple Pong Plop	December 27, 2011
France	Dumont family	€100,000	Loner	July 26, 2012
Philippines	Tristan Encarnacion & Niño Logarta	₱1,090,000	Glass Road Trucker (2 times per person)	February 4, 2014
Philippines	Gerry & JC Peñalosa	₱1,050,000	On the Rebound (4 baskets, 3 balls per basket)	February 19, 2014
Philippines	Meg Imperial	₱1,070,000	Office Fling (3 times)	July 22, 2016
Philippines	Jodi Santamaria	₱1,070,000	Mouth to Mouth (7 times)	September 19, 2016
Philippines	Negi & Long Mejia	₱1,070,000	Pong^{5} (1 time per person)	February 9, 2017
Philippines	Zeus Collins	₱1,050,000	Wheel of a Deal (5 tables, 4 solitaire cards per table by group)	January 7, 2019
Philippines	Eric Nicolas	₱1,050,000	Double Up (5 times)	February 19, 2019
Philippines	Enchong Dee	₱1,145,000	Don't Blow The Joker (1 time)	April 12, 2019
Venezuela	Jesús Colón	Bs. 100,000	Supercoin	2013

== See also ==
- The Cube, a similar show airing in the United Kingdom
- Beat the Clock
- List of television game show franchises
