= Azteca México =

American cable TV channel

Azteca Mexico
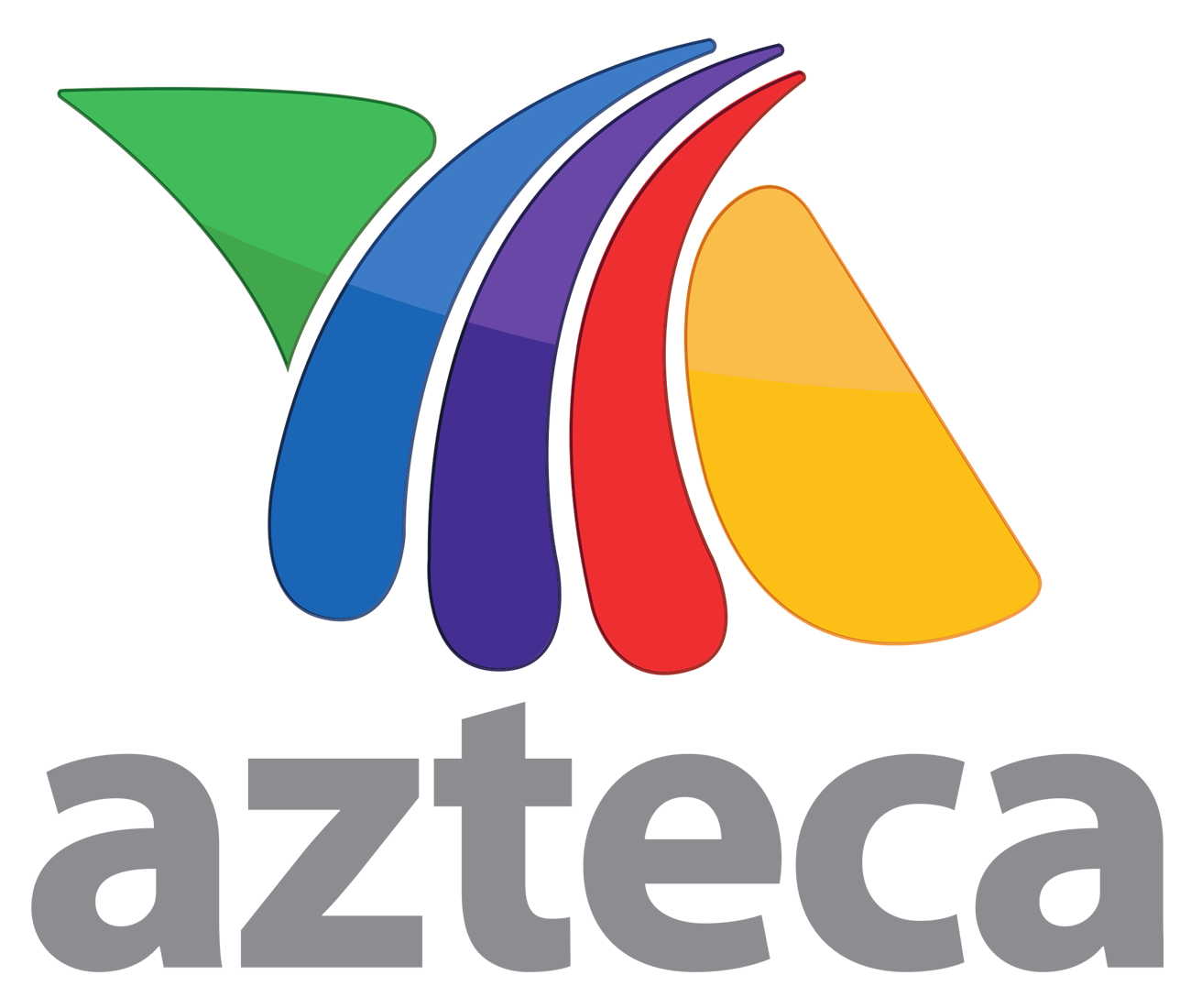
- Type: Spanish language television channel
- Country: United States; Mexico
- Headquarters: Los Angeles, California; Mexico City
- Broadcast area: United States
- Owner: Azteca International Corporation
- Parent: TV Azteca
- Key people: Luis J. Echarte (CEO, Azteca International Corporation)
- Launch date: June 2, 2008
- Dissolved: October 4, 2016
- Picture format: 480i (SDTV)

Azteca México was an American subscription channel that carried a combined schedule of TV Azteca's three domestic Mexican networks at the time (Azteca 7, Azteca Trece and adn40) in the United States. The network was exclusive to DirecTV viewers, carried on its channel 442 next to the default national feed of Azteca América after June 2, 2008. Its scheduling was often live with the domestic Mexican networks it shared programming with, compared to Azteca América's different scheduling to compete against its American competitors. It also carried no sports programming outside of highlights and sports talk shows.

Azteca removed the channel on October 4, 2016, upon Estrella TV acquired carriage on the service and assumed channel 442 in its place. The impending end of a competitor, MundoMax, and Azteca América finding new steam as it reacquired former affiliates from that network (and recruited new stations) likely also played a role in the discontinuation of Azteca México.
