= Voprosy I Otvety (TV channel) =

- Country: Russia
- Broadcast area: Russia, Ukraine, Latvia, Lithuania, Estonia, Belarus, Kazakhstan, Kyrgyzstan, Moldova, Georgia, Armenia etc.
- Headquarters: Moscow, 2G, 1st Rizhsky backstreet

Programming
- Language(s): Russian
- Picture format: 4:3

Ownership
- Owner: CJSC "Television Company STREAM"

History
- Launched: CJSC "Television Company STREAM"

Links
- Website: http://www.tv-stream.ru/tv/telekanal-voprosy-i-otvety

Voprosy I Otvety (Russian: Вопросы и ответы, English: Questions and Answers) is a game show television channel which offers its viewers an opportunity to "join the game" when it is convenient. Its programs consist of short episodes.

The channel belongs to the broadcaster Television Company Stream, one of the largest broadcasting companies in Russia. The distribution channel network "STREAM" has about 1,400 operators of cable, satellite, and IPTV-networks broadcast in all nine federal subjects of Russia, as well as in the CIS and Europe. It is an analogue of the British television channel Challenge and the American channel GSN.

By the end of 2013, the number of "STREAM" TV viewers, including "Voprosy I Otvety", exceeded 27 million people.

On 27 January 2011, the Director-General, Konstantin Zakharov, who previously held senior positions at other channels, was replaced by Kirill Legat. The post of Deputy Director-General was taken by Svetlana Sorokina, who also served as the CFO. The producer of the channel is Viktor Khomich, who has many years of experience as an editor, director, and presenter of several radio programs. The manager of the distribution service is Michel Tonoyan.

== List of game shows ==
- A Question of Genius
- Agentstvo Odinokikh Serdets
- Algorithm
- All Star Mr & Mrs
- Bankomat. Wyścig z czasem (Polish version of The Cash Machine)
- Brain Ring (Russian and Belarusian versions)
- Breakaway
- Britain's Brainiest
- Cash Cab
- Cash Trapped
- Chto? Gde? Kogda? (Russian version of "What? Where? When?")
- Detective Show
- Dva Royalya (Russian version of "The Lyrics Board")
- Ekstremalnyye Situatsii
- El Grand Prix del verano (including Grand Prix. Express)
- Fifteen to One
- Fort Boyard
- Instant Cash
- Koleso Istorii
- Le Tricheur (French version of "Only One Knows")
- Meshabet Ahkesef (Israeli version of "The Money Pump")
- Poymi Menya (Russian version of "Hot Streak")
- Proshche Prostogo (Russian version of "Hollywood Squares")
- Race to Escape
- Richard Hammond's Blast Lab
- Russian Roulette
- Schastlivy Sluchay
- Sokrovishche Natsii
- Sto K Odnomu (Russian version of "Family Feud")
- Svoya Igra (Russian version of "Jeopardy!")
- The Chair (British and New Zealand versions)
- The Chase (UK)
- The Chase (US)
- The Cube
- The Edge
- The Pyramid Game
- Reflex
- Ugaday Melodiyu (Russian version of "Name That Tune")
- Umnitsy I Umniki
- Ustami Mladentsa (Russian version of "Child's Play")
- Who Wants to Be a Millionaire?
- Zolotaya Likhoradka
