= Estrella TV =

American Spanish-language television network

- Type: Broadcast television network
- Country: United States
- Broadcast area: Nationwide (via digital terrestrial television in many markets; national feed available on some cable systems elsewhere)
- Affiliates: List of affiliates
- Headquarters: Burbank, California

Programming
- Language: Spanish

Ownership
- Owner: MediaCo
- Parent: HPS Investment Partners, LLC; Standard General
- Key people: Peter Markham (President/CEO, Estrella Media); Brian Kei (COO/CFO, Estrella Media); Ivan Stoilkovic (Executive Vice President of Television Programming, Estrella Media)

History
- Founded: January 27, 2009; 17 years ago
- Launched: September 14, 2009; 17 years ago
- Founder: Lenard Liberman and Miguel Banojian

Links
- Website: estrellatv.com

Estrella TV (Spanish pronunciation: [esˈtɾeʝa teˈβe]) is an American Spanish-language broadcast television network owned by MediaCo, which is co-owned by HPS Investment Partners, LLC & Standard General. The network primarily features programs, the vast majority of which are produced by the network itself, aimed at Hispanic and Latino American audiences – featuring a mix of entertainment series, reality television series, drama series, news, sports, and imported Mexican-produced feature films.

Estrella TV's programming, production and advertising operations are headquartered in the Los Angeles suburb of Burbank, California. The network's operations are overseen by MediaCo CEO Peter Markham, who has been in the post since the departure of co-founder Lenard Liberman amid a corporate reorganization in October 2019. The network is available in many media markets via low-power and some full-power over-the-air broadcast television stations (many of which carry Estrella TV on their digital subchannels), and on select cable television providers through either a local broadcast affiliate or the network's default national feed.

== History ==
=== Beginnings ===
Estrella TV's beginnings trace back to 1998, when Liberman Broadcasting – owner of Spanish language radio stations in several media markets with large Spanish language populations, including four radio stations in the third-largest U.S. market – made its entry into television broadcasting when its founders, Mexican-born media executive Jose Liberman and his son Lenard, purchased KRCA (channel 62) in Los Angeles, California, a television station affiliated with the Home Shopping Network at the time.

On August 31, 1998, Liberman converted KRCA into an independent station with a dual-ethnic programming format. The station ran a block of Spanish language programs during its daytime schedule – running from 7:00 a.m. to 5:00 p.m. weekdays – originally consisting largely of dubbed versions of drama series from the Universal Television library (such as Airwolf and Emergency!) and Mexican-produced feature films; the remainder of KRCA's schedule consisted of Asian-imported programming from Japan and various South Asian countries. By 2002, KRCA dropped its Asian-imported programming and became a Spanish language outlet full-time. Liberman acquired two additional stations over the next six years; in 2001, the company bought English Shop-at-Home affiliate KZJL (channel 61) in Houston, Texas. Then in 2004, it purchased KMPX (channel 29) in Dallas–Fort Worth, which then served as the original flagship owned-and-operated station of religious broadcaster Daystar (which subsequently purchased PBS station KDTN to replace KMPX as its flagship); Liberman also purchased low-power station KSDX-LP (channel 29) in San Diego, California that same year.

In 1999, the Liberman family hired Miguel Banojian, an ex Vice President of Univision and ex member of Univision's board of directors, to form what became LBI's television division which under such corporate structure, developed a television division under LBI, and subsequently structured the production division within its LBI Media unit to produce original programming content. Such move was the result of Mr. Banojian understanding of the lack of Mexican programming availability and the need to produce original content under the newly formed LBI studios. Such corporate division was solely supervised and launched by Mr. Banojian, and subsequently later distributed to other stations purchased by LBI Media. LBI Studios went on to produce more than 4,000 hours a year under Mr. Banojian's helm at the company, focusing on a mix of variety series, sketch comedy, scripted drama and music programs, talk shows and game shows. One of its earliest programs, the reality game show Gana la Verde ("Win the Green"), caused controversy after several immigrant advocacy groups (including the American Immigration Lawyers Association, the Central American Resource Center, the Latina Lawyers Bar Association and the Mexican American Bar Association) and California U.S. House Reps. Xavier Becerra, Hilda Solis and Linda Sánchez complained that the format – which debuted in July 2004, and featured undocumented people competing in extreme Fear Factor-style competitions for the opportunity to win one year of legal assistance from an immigration attorney to help them obtain a green card – put its participants in danger of deportation by immigration authorities aware of the show. Programming production ramped up in 2004 with series that included:

- Estudio 2 ("Studio 2"), a variety series conducted from a multi-stage studio that mainly featured performances from Mexican Regional and some contemporary Latin music artists, recurring comedic sketches (primarily featuring established Mexican comic actors such as Luis de Alba and Liliana "La Chupitos" Ariaga) and the karaoke-style elimination game "Aficiandos";
- José Luis sin Censura ("José Luis Uncensored"), a conflict talk show hosted by Jose Luis Gonzalez;
- Fábrica de la Risa ("Laugh Factory"), featuring various self-contained comedic sketches performed primarily by a troupe of five actors;
- Secretos ("Secrets"), a Cheaters-style scripted drama focusing on a team of private investigators tasked with solving mysteries and crimes, and uncovering deceptions by family members and significant others;
- ¡A que no puedes! ("I Bet You Can't!"), a game show featuring teams of contestants (originally consisting of family members, before shifting towards featuring actors, musicians and models) conducting physical challenges and dares to bank monetary prizes;
- Los Ángeles al Día, a magazine hosted by Penélope Menchaca.
- and El Show de Don Cheto ("The Don Cheto Show"), a music- and game-based variety series emceed by comedian/host Juan Razo as his character Don Cheto.

Recognizing that the independents could not compete in that arena with the two dominant national Spanish language networks, Univision and Telemundo, Liberman opted not to produce or acquire telenovelas for the stations, opting instead to produce lower-cost programming to counterprogram the longer-established networks. Although much smaller in size than the parents of Univision and Telemundo, Liberman was more than willing to open its wallets to sign talent from popular Latin American countries to star in its programs, in addition to using performers from the U.S.

By 2006, the company had adopted a consistent branding for its three television stations under the brand "Estrella TV" (or "Star TV"). Liberman expanded the Estrella TV format to other markets where it acquired television stations, featuring much of the same programs as those aired by the Los Angeles, Dallas and Houston outlets (some of which aired in different timeslots than they did on KRCA, KMPX and KZJL). On May 30, 2007, Liberman Broadcasting purchased KPNZ (channel 24) in Salt Lake City, Utah from Utah Communications, LLC for $10 million (although it would continue to operate as an English language independent station from after the purchase was finalized that November until February 2008); then on August 18, 2008, the company purchased low-power station KVPA-LP (channel 42) in Phoenix, Arizona from Latin America Broadcasting, Inc. for $1.25 million.

As Liberman expanded its programming to other O&Os, its mix of programming shifted to appeal towards various Hispanic and Latino audiences (whereas Liberman originally programmed KRCA to cater to Los Angeles' predominately Mexican audience, when it first became a part-time Spanish station) and helped the pseudo-network beat its major competitors. In the Los Angeles market, the programs helped KRCA become a strong ratings competitor, even beating Telemundo owned-and-operated station KVEA for second place (ranking behind long-dominant Univision O&O KMEX-TV) among the market's Spanish language stations during the November 2008 sweeps period, at which time KMPX and KZJL also beat the respective Telemundo outlets (KXTX-TV and KTMD) for second in all key adult demographics among the Spanish stations in the Houston and Dallas markets. In all five markets, the Estrella TV-branded stations ranked in second place among Hispanic adults in the 18–34, 18-49 and 25-54 demographic, beating Telemundo's ratings by as much as 100% and Telefutura's by as much as 64% during the weekday early fringe and prime time (3:00 to 11:00 p.m.) periods.

=== National expansion ===
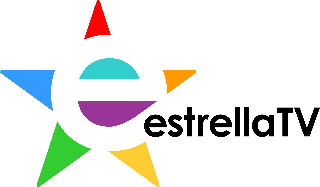
Original network logo, used from September 14, 2009, to February 2, 2020.

On January 27, 2009, at the National Association of Television Program Executives Convention in Las Vegas, Liberman Broadcasting announced that it would turn the Estrella TV concept into a full-fledged national network that would launch at a then-yet-determined date later that year, which would be targeted at adults between the ages of 18 and 49 years old. Liberman had explored the possibility of developing a national network in 2007, when it raised $200 million in capital to acquire additional television stations and expand programming production. LBI Media's decision to launch the network came despite experiencing revenue declines that affected other broadcasting companies during the Great Recession (with LBI's corporate revenues having declined by 16.4%, to $28.4 million, and its operating income down by 5.6%, at $19.2 million, during the second quarter of 2009 over the previous fiscal quarter).

To counterprogram networks that already established a foothold with the Hispanic and Latino demographic (such as Univision, Telemundo, Telefutura and Azteca América), Liberman chose to maintain the existing format used by the company's independent stations and have Estrella TV rely on the company's extensive library of original programming that originated on the six outlets (which Liberman had also syndicated to broadcasters in Puerto Rico and Latin American countries such as Panama, Honduras and El Salvador) as well as newer content for its inaugural schedule – including Estudio 2; Secretos; !A Que no Puedes¡; José Luis sin Censura; Los Chuperamigos, a sketch comedy series led by Lilliana Arriaga and a cast of popular Mexican comedic actors including Luis De Alba, Alejandro Suarez, Maribel "La Pelangocha" Fernandez and Carlos Bonavides; El Show de Lagrimita y Costel ("The Lagrimita and Costel Show"), a variety series hosted by father and son comedians Costel and Guillermo Cienfuegos in clown attire; and two daily news programs (the twice-daily weekday evening national newscast, Noticias Estrella TV ("Estrella TV News") and Alarma TV ("Alarm TV"), a half-hour prime time newsmagazine focusing on caught-on-tape footage). The initial original programming-focused slate made up the majority of its schedule, running for a total of 56 hours per week from early-afternoon through prime time on Monday through Saturday (its Sunday schedule would rely mainly on imported feature films).

Liberman had set July 1 as the date for Estrella TV's projected national launch by March 2009, however the company ultimately delayed the rollout by 3½ months; the national Estrella TV network formally commenced programming on September 14, 2009. On March 8, 2010, Nielsen began to include Estrella TV in the ratings provider's People Meter sample reports, alongside the other major Spanish language broadcast networks; the network was initially not listed in the daily "Television Index" reports that incorporate the other networks.

Over time, Estrella TV made major inroads in approaching viewership parity with Univision, Telemundo and Telefutura. By November 2012, Estrella TV ranked in fourth place in total viewers among all Hispanic broadcast networks, with an average of around 200,000 viewers. It was the only Spanish language network to experience an increase in viewership year-over-year during October 2013, the network placed third during prime time in total viewership among Hispanic audiences and in the demographic of Hispanic adults between the ages of 25 and 54, with the newsmagazine Alarma TV and late-evening national newscast Noticiero Enrique Gratas ranking within the 20 highest-rated Spanish-language television programs. On January 7, 2014, former Los Angeles mayor Antonio Villaraigosa was appointed by Liberman Broadcasting to serve as a senior advisor for the network, helping provide input in its programming, community and advertiser relations. In hiring Villaraigosa, Liberman CEO Lenard Liberman cited the company's need to "increase our sensitivity and understanding of the needs of the Hispanic community," with Villaraigosa citing in part that he was drawn to the "human capital" behind the network.

On May 15, 2015, Liberman Broadcasting announced that Estrella TV would launch a multichannel production firm, Fenómeno Studios, which would develop programming content targeted at millennials between the ages and 18 and 34. The studio, which launched that June, would produce specialized genre-based content (including music, comedy, gaming, lifestyle, do-it-yourself, beauty and sports content) from a 23,000-square-foot (0.53-acre) facility near Liberman's corporate headquarters and production studios in Burbank, featuring separate production soundstages, edit bays and offices, with the intent to use existing performers from Estrella TV shows with a broad presence on social media (such as singer Luis Coronel, who also served as a judge on the talent competition series Tengo Talento, Mucho Talento, and Juan "Don Cheto" Razo) and attract existing YouTube talent that would have their content distributed on the Fenómeno online network – with the possibility of some newer talent curated on the Fenómeno networks being considered for program development crossover to the linear Estrella TV network. On May 31, 2019, Liberman Broadcasting shut down Fenomeno Studios due to their bankruptcy from the network, its unknown whether or not Fenomeno Studios will return later this year. Estrella TV assumed a permanent channel slot on DirecTV on October 4, 2016, taking over the channel 442 slot previously occupied by Azteca México, which was discontinued by Mexican network TV Azteca in favor of focusing on its domestic Azteca América broadcast network.

With the demise of Spanish network MundoMax, Estrella TV has seen significant growth when it acquired 2 of the former network's affiliates.

In 2018, Estrella TV was the only American television network to experience total day ratings growth in cable viewership among viewers over age 12 between the same period in 2016. That year saw Estrella TV begin producing new drama and comedy series such as LOL (a Canadian-produced sketch comedy series that foregoes the use of verbal dialogue, performed by comedians across the world) and Tarde lo Conocí (a novela-style drama series focusing on the life of musical superstar Patricia Terehan as she rose from poverty to stardom, while faces tough challenges that take her to path from fame to misfortune). On October 10, 2018, Estrella TV re-ordered the Hispanic television landscape, when it bumped UniMás for third place among the national Spanish language networks in the weeknight prime time (8:00-11:00 p.m.) period, accomplishing a goal that Liberman had wanted for the network since its launch. However, it is unknown whether or not the network is still ranked as third place after it was confirmed that Unimas finished the 2018/2019 season as third.

On November 21, 2018, Liberman Broadcasting filed for Chapter 11 bankruptcy protection with the United States Bankruptcy Court for the District of Delaware. The company—which claimed assets worth between $100 million and $500 million and liabilities worth between $500 million and $1 billion—sought to reduce its overall debt by more than $350 million and secured $38 million in debtor-in-possession financing. On April 17, 2019, Liberman obtained approval of its reorganization plan from the Delaware bankruptcy court, with the expectation that it would be able to clear its balance sheet within the following several months. As a result, Estrella TV suspended production of or cancelled outright several series on its schedule; among them, the talk show Noches con Platanito, which was temporarily replaced by the telenovela La Esclava Blanca for three months beginning on June 20, while its morning news programs Primera Edición and Buenos Dias Familia were discontinued and replaced by a double-run of telenovelas and a rebroadcast of the previous weeknight's edition of Cierre de Edición. (The network would later launch a new morning news program, En la Mañana—anchored by Rosy Martell, Thomas Rubio and Natalia Garduño—on November 8.)

On October 15, 2019, Liberman Broadcasting completed its reorganization plan, turning over ownership of the company—which was formally renamed LBI Media, Inc.—to its first lien lender, private equity firm HPS Investment Partners, LLC, which sponsored the reorganization plan; the reorganization eliminated more than $350 million of debt from its balance sheet. As part of the corporate reorganization, co-founder/CEO Lenard Liberman divested his equity in LBI, and was replaced as the company's CEO by former Granite Broadcasting and Communications Corporation of America Chairman Peter Markham. On February 3, 2020, LBI Media rebranded as Estrella Media, borrowing its name from the network, with the network and its corporate parent adopting a unified logo brand utilizing a four-pointed star (described as "a symbol of the brightest star, the four cardinal directions, and a steadfast navigation guide," and which replaced the multi-colored star "e" logo used since the network's launch). On the same day was the launch of a new late night talk show hosted by popular Mexican YouTuber and voice actor Alex Montiel titled "Nos Cayó la Noche", which replaces Noches Con Platanito citing updated changes to the network's programming ever since it was under new management. On October 22 Estrella TV premiered another late night talk hosted by Mexican Actor Omar Chaparro replacing Alex Montiel. Its predecessor "Nos Cayo la Noche" had confirmed a second season since March but it's likely plans for the second season have been discarded.

In 2021, Estrella launched two advertising-supported streaming networks, the news channel Estrella News, and the game show-oriented channel Estrella Games. The two networks are also carried on the digital subchannels of Estrella O&Os.

== Programming ==
As of 2020, Estrella TV operates on a 113-hour network programming schedule. Its base programming feed provides various types of general entertainment programming Monday through Fridays from 6:30 a.m. to 12:00 a.m. and Saturdays and Sundays from 12:00 p.m. to 12:00 a.m. Eastern and Pacific Time; the network also carries a half-hour of children's programming – which comply with core programming guidelines defined by the Federal Communications Commission's Children's Television Act – on Monday through Saturday mornings at 8:30 a.m. Eastern and Pacific Time, consisting of dubbed versions of wildlife and nature programs originally produced in English that comply with educational programming. All remaining time periods are filled with infomercials that were either originally produced or dubbed into Spanish, a block that had previously made up half the network's broadcast day at its debut, but now is limited to between midnight and 6:00 a.m. ET/PT. The network carries a separate block of additional entertainment programs on Los Angeles flagship station KRCA on Monday through Fridays from 1:00 to 2:30 a.m. and Saturdays and Sundays from 1:00 to 2:00 a.m.

The majority of Estrella TV's programming schedule relies on the extensive library of originally-produced television programs that are produced the production division of and owned by network parent company LBI Media, incorporating both first-run and archived programs, which comprised a total of more than 5,000 hours of entertainment content at the network's launch. The network's series programming primarily covers formats common in Spanish language television broadcasters in the U.S. and other countries, consisting of reality, talk and variety programming as well as music, drama and sketch comedy programs, with some programs having originally aired in Los Angeles on KRCA and syndicated to Liberman's Spanish language independent stations prior to the formation of the network.

Much of Estrella TV's programming consists of variety series (such as Estudio 2, El Show de Don Cheto and Noches Con Platanito ("Tonight with Platanito"), a prime time talk-variety show hosted by Sergio Verduzco as his clown character Platanito that is modeled after late-night talk formats), comedy series (such as Los Chuperamigos and Fábrica de la Risa), reality programs (such as Rica Famosa Latina ("Rich, Famous, Latina"), a series created by Joyce Giraud, and modeled after the Real Housewives franchise that Giraud was briefly part of, following the lives of a group of famed Latina entertainers), along with a limited amount of scripted programs (such as Secretos and Historias Delirantes ("Disturbing Stories"), an anthology series featuring supernaturally themed storylines).

On September 14, 2009, the day the network Estrella TV launched, unveils "Estellas Hoy" an entertainment show that offers viewers an exclusive and unprecedented look into the world of top Latino celebrities. The show was previously hosted by Jorge Gomez Haro and Lilli Brillanti. Gino del Corte and Andrea Rincón, and Victoria Del Rosal have been taking the helm of the show until July 27 when the show was cancelled and replaced with a newsmagazine titled "I Testigo". On June 11 the network returned an entertainment news offering with El Mameluco a show similar to Dish Nation focusing on celebrity entertainment news told by their perspective. The shows hosts are Ricardo "Rika" Rubio, Giselle Bravo, Said Garcia, and Stephanie Gerard. The show premiered in select US cities and started making its Television debut on August 6.

As of 2015, the network's longest-running first-run entertainment program is Tengo Talento, Mucho Talento ("I Have Talent, Lots of Talent"), a reality talent competition series similar in format to the Got Talent franchise which debuted on October 5, 2009. Among its early program offerings was Estrellitas Del Sabado, a two-hour family variety series featuring talent from children ages 12 and under and hosted by Itatí Cantoral, which was designed to compete with Univision's then-Saturday night stalwart Sabado Gigante; the program was cancelled in 2012, after two seasons. The Saturday evening time period has been partly filled since then by Sabados en Concierto ("Saturdays in Concert"), a weekly series of concert performances from various traditional and contemporary Latin music artists that is an offshoot of a series of Friday night concert specials that began airing in October 2010. The network debuted its first original miniseries on November 15, 2013, Jenni – La Vida de Una Diva ("Jenni - The Life of a Diva"), a ten-episode series chronicling the life and career of singer Jenni Rivera (who died in a plane crash near Monterrey, Mexico, en route from a concert performance in December 2012), though it was an unofficial unendorsed miniseries due to Rivera's long-time association with mun2 and Telemundo.

At its launch, Liberman Broadcasting president/CEO Lenard Liberman cited that it would not carry telenovelas as part of its schedule (either produced by the company or acquired from other distributors), citing the genre's skewing towards an older and more female audience; however, the network would eventually reverse course in 2015, when it began to incorporate acquired telenovelas (such as the Venevision/Univision co-production El Talismán ("The Talisman")) as part of its schedule, however these programs currently only occupy an hour of the network's weekday daytime schedule As of October 2015. The network also regularly airs imported Spanish-language feature films originally produced in Mexico and South American countries on weekday afternoons seven days a week; the film roster does not concentrate on films from any specific era, meaning any film from the black-and-white era to contemporary times, and films made for either domestic theatrical or home video/DVD release can be featured. As of 2018, Estrella TV now carries telenovelas and other serialized dramatic series distributed by Caracol Internacional.

In 2017, Estrella TV launched its first sitcom, Las Vega's, focusing on the lives of four women who uncover secrets of how their husband and father died (though many electronic program guides misidentified it as the 2003 NBC series Las Vegas). On August 6, 2018, the network launched El Mameluco, an hour-long entertainment news program formatted similarly to the English language syndicated program Dish Nation; hosted by veteran radio producer Ricardo Rubio "El Pinche Rika", journalist and Radio producer Said Garcia, radio and TV personality Giselle Bravo, and actress/singer/comedienne Stephanie Gerard, El Mameluco originally premiered as a series on Facebook Live in select U.S. cities before making its national television debut. As of April 2020, the show is being broadcast remotely on Facebook Live as "El Mameluco Desde Casa" due to the COVID-19 pandemic. On June 1, the network is set to debut a new entertainment news show titled "Chismes En Vivo", hosted by Chisme no Like hosts "Elisa Beristain and Javier Ceriani", replacing El Mameluco under updated programming changes that are being made ever since the network began being under new management since February 2020

On October 30, 2018, Estrella TV signed a multi-year agreement with Fremantle North America to broadcast 100 Latinos Dijeron, an American Spanish-language adaptation of Family Feud that previously aired on the now-defunct MundoMax from 2013 to 2016, in early 2019. The program, which is hosted by actor/comedian Armando Hernandez (who replaced original host Marco Antonio Regil), debuted on the network on February 19, 2019. During its second season run, the network added actor and comedian Mau Nieto as new host and later became a key figure in ratings success of the show. As of 2020, repeats of the first season run with Armando Hernandez are being aired weekdays at 11 A.M hour. On June 1, 2020, the network bought rights to reruns of the original 2013 version of 100 Latinos Dijeron hosted by Marco Antonio Regil.

On February 3, 2020, Estrella TV revamped its prime time lineup, adding the talk show Nos Cayó la Noche, hosted by popular Mexican YouTuber Alex Montiel (which replaced and utilizes the late-night format used by its predecessor Noches con Platanito, which ceased production in June 2019 amid corporate cutbacks instituted upon LBI Media's bankruptcy), and added a half-hour version of the Fenomeno Studios web series Pepe's Office (which resulted in the displacement of Alarma TV, now serving as the lead-out—instead of lead-in as previous—of its late-evening newscast Cierre de Edición, to late night). On February 20, Alarma TV returned to its regular hour by popular demand, which involved Pepe's Office being replaced by a comedy web series titled Enchufe TV, citing programming changes that made more sense for its television ratings.

On May 6, 2021, the network announced several new shows to its prime time lineup at its virtual upfront which included the premiere of a dating game show titled "La Mascara del Amor" hosted by multi talented Latin singer and actress Angelica Vale which premiered May 27 of that same year. Other new shows included were two drama shows titled "Encrucijada", "Tatuajes" and competition shows such as "MasterChef Latinos", and "Mero Maistros". MasterChef Latinos (originally intended to be a Sunday Night primetime show but instead was moved to Thursday Nights when the network announced the premiere date February 10) is a reality cooking series based on the English version from Fox and Endemol Shine that showcases 50 potential amateur chefs and home cooks preparing their best meals in front of three well recognized MasterChef Latinos judges Chef Benito Molina, Chef Adrián Herrera, and Chef Claudia Sandoval. Encrucijada is a one-hour anthology series that premiered September 19, 2021 and airs every Sunday night that focus on the lives of people also known as their road in the fork moment and how the challenges and triumphs of choices in everyday life shape our future.

On April 19, 2022, TV Azteca had entered into a content and co-production agreement with Estrella TV that will see its news and entertainment programming blended onto the network's schedule.

=== News programming ===
Estrella TV operates a news division under the umbrella brand Noticias Estrella TV ("Estrella TV News"); the division was formally known as "Noticiero Estrella TV" the same name for the evening newscast which launched with the network on September 14, 2009, with the two flagship half-hour, Monday-through-Friday news programs, Noticiero Estrella TV (Estrella TV News), and Cierre de Edición ("Final Edition"), which respectively air at 5:30 and 10:00 p.m. Eastern and Pacific Time. The division is also joined by a one hour long late-night daily newsmagazine series Alarma TV ("Alarm TV"), focusing mainly on caught-on-tape videos and news stories throughout Latin America and across the globe. Estrella TV's news division also broadcasts occasional special news coverage such as U.S. and Mexican elections, and the State of the Union Address. Throughout the COVID-19 pandemic, Noticias Estrella TV has been delivering a complete coverage of all the latest news of this outbreak in a special series titled "Noticiero Estrella TV: Reportaje especial Coronavirus la Pandemia" with three additional news hours from 12:00pm/4:00pm/9:00pm, which lasted from March 16 and concluded on May 29, resuming the networks daily programming a few days later.

On April 13, 2010, Liberman Broadcasting announced that it had reached a deal with veteran journalist Enrique Gratas to join Estrella TV as anchor of a prime time newscast that would serve as the companion to the early-evening broadcast, Noticiero con Enrique Gratas ("News with Enrique Gratas"), which debuted six days later on April 19. Differing somewhat in tone compared to the early evening edition, the program – which adopted its current title, Cierre de Edición ("Final Edition") in 2013, and airs at 10:30 p.m. Eastern Time – provides more in-depth analysis of news stories affecting the U.S. Hispanic community, similar to the late-night newscast that Gratas formerly anchored for Univision from 1999 until he was laid off by that network in 2009, Noticiero Univision: Última Hora. Gratas expanded his duties in 2011, with a short-lived weekly investigative newsmagazine El Momento con Enrique Gratas (A Moment with Enrique Gratas). Gratas took a sabbatical from Cierre de Edición in August 2015 due to ongoing health issues, but remained the main anchor of the program until his death from a reported diagnosis of metastatic cancer at age 71 on October 8, 2015. Pedro Ferriz Híjar (who joined the network from Mexican cable news channel Efekto TV, where he anchored a prime time newscast) was named anchor of Cierre de Edición and En La Lucha on February 2, 2016, and debuted later that month. Since early 2020, the network hired Legendary News Anchor José Armando Ronstadt after Pedro Ferriz Hijar left the network

In 2013, Estrella TV hired another veteran of Univision's news division, Myrka Dellanos, to serve as main anchor of its early evening newscast Noticiero Estrella TV, and host a series of interview specials for the network, En Exclusiva con Myrka Dellanos ("Exclusive with Myrka Dellanos"). Dellanos left the network on April 24, 2015, and was subsequently replaced on Noticiero Estrella TV by Adriana Ruggiero, a former evening anchor at Los Angeles flagship station KRCA. A few months later the network replaced Adriana Ruggiero by Adriana Yanez.

On June 28, 2015, in the runup to the 2016 Presidential election, the network debuted En La Lucha ("In the Ring"), a half-hour Sunday midday political and current affairs program featuring panel discussions on various political and socioeconomic topics of impact to the Latino community in the United States. The program was originally hosted by Hernán Molina – who in addition to such roles at Univision, CNN en Español and NTN24, previously served as a political analyst for Los Angeles flagship station KRCA – and also served as the program's co-managing editor until his termination by Liberman in December 2015. During the month of December 2016 the network canceled En la Lucha and replaced it with repeats of classic programming of the network. Subsequently, on July 6, the network replaced the cancelled Estrellas Hoy with iTestigo, an hour-long entertainment "news" focusing on user-generated citizen journalism content of news events and social issues from around the world. The show had such a long run that lasted until September 3, 2021, when the network decided to cancel the show with their last edition airing on that day due to several problems with the time-slot and possibly low ratings.

On January 9, 2017, Estrella TV launched two weekday morning news programs: Primera Edicion ("First Edition"), which focuses on news affecting the Latino community (anchored originally by Estrella TV personality Anais Salazar, who also served as newsreader for its lead-out program until late 2017), and Buenos Dias Familia ("Good Morning, Family"), a two-hour-long program focusing primarily on current events, celebrity interviews, human interest stories and entertainment news (hosted originally by Yul Bürkle, Aylin Mújica and Vanessa Arias). The latter program was originally announced by Liberman Broadcasting CEO Lenard Liberman at the network's May 12, 2014 upfront presentation in New York, originally intending to be a three-hour morning news and lifestyle program described as "an original alternative" to morning programs aired on its competitors (including Univision's Despierta América and Telemundo's Un Nuevo Día) and scheduled for a debut that fall; feature films, educational programming and a rebroadcast of Cierre de Edición continued to air in the program's intended time period until it formally debuted three years later, when the network overhauled its morning lineup to include repeats of defunct original variety series following Buenos Dias Familia. (William Valdés, a former host of the morning show, left in January 2019.) On May 31, 2019, Estrella TV cancelled Buenos Días, Familia and Primera Edicion citing low ratings for both programs, with their last editions airing on that day and their former time slots being filled by a rebroadcast of the previous weeknight's edition of Cierre de Edición and hour-long repeat blocks of telenovelas previously shown on the network in the 7:30 to 10:00 a.m. ET slot. On November 8 of that year, the network resumed a morning news offering with the debut of En La Mañana, a two-hour morning hard news program hosted by Natalia Garduño, Javier Olivares, and Rosy Martell, which focuses on national and world news, weather, entertainment and sports news. On June 22, 2020, the show got revamped with additional new hosts including Tomas Rubio, Giselle Bravo and Said Garcia with News of the day, entertainment, interviews, Sports, weather. On July 9, 2021, Estrella TV decided to cancel the Morning news show "En La Mañana" and was replaced with a small entertainment news show titled "En vivo" and a repeat of the weeknight newscast "Cierre de Edición". On February 27, with a partnership from TV Azteca, the network added Venga La Alegria as part of a new daytime block to better serve the Hispanic with their Mexican culture heritage.

Locally among the network's station body, Estrella TV has fewer stations that have an independent news operation than those of Univision and Telemundo; these in-house news departments are primarily limited to Estrella TV's owned-and-operated stations, including at Los Angeles flagship station KRCA, which had a news operation at the network's launch. On April 29, 2019, Estrella TV started to expand its news operations among its O&Os in three key markets with the premiere of daily evening local newscasts in Houston (KZJL), Dallas–Fort Worth (KMPX-TV), and Miami (WGEN-TV/WVFW-LD); newscasts on those three stations are produced out of the studios of its Dallas-based O&O KMPX, which was established as a production hub for the respective twice-daily programs. On November 30, 2021, the Estrella Media decided to cancel all three newscasts produced in Dallas and outsource them to Multimedios in Mexico. 45 people in Dallas lost their jobs as a result of this decision.

=== Sports programming ===
Estrella TV also operates a sports division Estrella TV Deportes ("Estrella TV Sports") which also originates from the networks Burbank headquarters. The division, which is responsible for creating sports content on Estrella TV, has produced soccer matches from Major League Soccer including Los Angeles Football Club and FC Dallas for the Los Angeles and Dallas markets until the end of 2022. The network has also produced Liga MX soccer matches involving Dorados de Sinaloa through the 2015–2016 season. The network currently produces coverage of Liga MX soccer teams Tigres UANL and FC Juárez for both men and women's. It is home for the mixed martial arts franchise "Combate Global", where their fights are held in Burbank, California. The network has a Friday night boxing series called "Boxeo Estrella TV" showcasing some of the best boxing from Mexico and Latin America. The network airs select Minor League Baseball games from the Copa de la Diversión tournament. Every weekend night, a sports newscast airs on Estrella TV and Estrella News titled "Estrella TV Deportes" hosted by Francisco X Rivera, which highlights some of best moments from past games. The division has done television specials involving the Super Bowl.

On January 29, 2013, Estrella TV acquired its first broadcast television rights to a televised sporting event, when Liberman Broadcasting announced that it had signed an agreement with Alianza F.C. to obtain the exclusive U.S. Spanish broadcast rights to telecast Salvadoran Primera División soccer matches involving the El Salvador-based soccer club. Under the deal, which began with its first game broadcast six days later on February 3, the network would broadcast Alianza F.C.'s Sunday afternoon matches (although it occasionally airs prime time matches, mainly on Friday evenings), and produce pre-game and post-game analysis programs bookending the telecasts. In May 2014, the network acquired the U.S. broadcast rights to the Liga MX-affiliated Copa Socio MX exhibition tournament, a six-game tournament involving teams within the league that is played in major U.S. venues.

On July 27, 2015, the network expanded its sports coverage when it reached a three-year programming agreement with Golden Boy Promotions, as the Oscar De La Hoya-founded boxing promotion's exclusive deal with Fox Sports Media Group (in which its fights were broadcast on Fox Sports 1 and Fox Deportes) expired due to Premier Boxing Champions's efforts which had Fox Sports sign with that circuit. Under the deal, Estrella TV obtained the rights to broadcast two live evening fight cards two weeks per month under the banner "Boxeo Estelar", as well as rights to the Friday night boxing showcase series LA Fight Club – the latter of which aired on the network as its first fight telecast on September 4, 2015. It was unknown whether the boxing series "Boxeo Estelar" would return since Golden Boy Promotions ended their deal with Estrella TV in end of 2018 and moved on to an agreement with DAZN. On March 25, 2021, the network announced in a press release from its parent company Estrella Media that it is bringing boxing back with a new series titled "Boxeo Estrella TV" thanks to a partnership with Producciones Deportivas in Mexico, where the network will showcase some of the best boxing from Mexico and Latin America and will be scheduled on the last Friday of each month.

For the 2015–16 season, the network started carrying Liga MX soccer matches involving Dorados de Sinaloa. After the club's relegation to the Ascenso MX league, the network stopped airing their home matches after the season ended.

On February 21, 2020, the network bought back soccer programming with a new partnership with (Los Angeles Football Club) the fastest growing franchise in MLS. The Los Angeles station network KRCA 62 broadcast selected home matches of the club's regular season. The following year on April 6, 2021, the network also announced another partnership with (FC Dallas), where the Dallas station KMPX would televise selected home soccer matches. The network ended their contracts at the end of 2022 when Apple announced a multi year partnership with Major League Soccer resulting in regional networks to also cease partnerships with local soccer teams from the league.

On June 16, Estrella Media announced a licensing multi year partnership with Los Angeles Chargers, in which Estrella TV 62 Los Angeles and Que Buena 105.5/94.3 FM, will be home to Preseason matches and Radio home to all matches through the entire NFL season involving playoffs, with Pre and Post game shows and a weekly Chargers series and news throughout the year.

In 2024, Minor League Baseball reached an agreement with Estrella TV to air select games from the Copa de la Diversión tournament.

=== Specials ===
Since the network's inception, Estrella TV has broadcast Los Premios de la Radio ("Radio Awards"), an annual awards ceremony held each November, honoring Mexican Regional music performers from classic and contemporary genres and involving Liebermann's radio stations. The network also holds the broadcast rights to Premios El Don, an award show held in January, awarding the contributions of Latinos in the American film industry.

On November 18, 2017, Estrella TV became the American Spanish language television broadcaster of Miss World (promoted as Miss Mundial), becoming the only U.S. television network to carry the beauty pageant. (E! had held the English-language telecast rights to the pageant in the U.S., but declined to air it for the 2017 edition.)

== Stations ==
As of October 2015, Estrella TV has seven owned-and-operated stations, and current and pending affiliation agreements with 45 additional television stations encompassing 50 states and the District of Columbia (including stations in 40 of the 50 largest Nielsen markets); counting only its broadcast stations, the network has an estimated national reach of 39.37% of all households in the United States (or 123,009,970 Americans with at least one television set).

National advertising sales for the network are handled by the Spanish Media Rep Team (SMRT), an LBI Media-owned sales organization that also sells spot advertising and handles sales representation for national accounts for Estrella TV owned-and-operated and affiliated stations; SMRT and local affiliates share the responsibility of selling advertising inventory, with affiliate stations retaining 40% of the commercial inventory not sold by Liberman. Stations are allowed the option to carry local programming – including newscasts, local public affairs programs, local brokered programming and political specials – in place of regular programming or infomercials aired within the base Estrella TV schedule.

After it announced the expansion of the Estrella TV concept into a national network, Liberman Broadcasting initially planned to launch the national Estrella TV network on all six of its existing independent stations, with company executives also immediately seeking agreements with prospective stations owned by other broadcasting companies to serve as charter affiliates of Estrella TV. Although it focused on affiliating with full-power stations (particularly digital subchannels of those already affiliated with other networks), the network ultimately obtained primary channel affiliations in several markets where Liberman did not own a station, mainly via agreements with low-power stations. Liberman estimated that Estrella TV would have an initial market reach covering about 70% of all Hispanic-inhabited U.S. households at its launch.

On February 2, 2009, eight days after the network's national launch was first announced, Liberman entered into an affiliation agreement with Communications Corporation of America, which launched the network in five of the company's Texas stations; the deal originally encompassed subchannel affiliations for four stations – KTSM-TV in El Paso, KVEO in Brownsville, KWKT-TV in Waco (as well as its Bryan satellite KYLE-TV) and KETK-TV in Tyler – but later added KPEJ-TV in Odessa as another subchannel-only affiliate through a separate agreement on April 27, 2010.

By the network's launch date in September, Estrella TV had expanded its footprint of charter outlets, signing affiliation agreements with Tribune Broadcasting (for WPIX in New York City); Sinclair Broadcast Group (initially for KVMY in Las Vegas); Sunbeam Television (for WSVN in Miami); Titan Broadcast Management (for KTNC in San Francisco and KFRE-TV in Sanger-Fresno); Belo (for KENS in San Antonio); and Hearst Television (for KOAT in Albuquerque and WPBF in West Palm Beach), helping to give the network affiliates in 68% of all Hispanic television households and nine of the ten largest Hispanic media markets in the U.S. Estrella TV debuted with 17 affiliated stations, in addition to the seven Liberman-owned charter stations, reaching near its national coverage goal with a Hispanic market reach of 68% and affiliates in nine of the ten largest Hispanic U.S. markets (including New York City, Los Angeles, Chicago, Dallas, Houston, San Antonio and Brownsville).

In addition, Liberman also purchased additional stations to serve as O&Os of the network, purchasing WASA-LP in Port Jervis, New York from Venture Technologies Group, LLC for $6 million on April 6, 2009 (WPIX relayed its programming on its 11.2 subchannel); KWHD (now KETD) in Denver from LeSEA Broadcasting for $6.5 million on January 28, 2010 (it joined the network on June 1, 2010); and W40BY (now WESV-LD) in Chicago from the Trinity Broadcasting Network (which operated it as a translator of WWTO-TV in LaSalle) on February 22, 2010 (it joined the network on December 7).

Estrella TV is natively transmitted in the 16:9 aspect ratio, launching high definition operations in mid-2016 in the 720p format, though for the most part this is limited to a few over-the-air stations and cable and satellite providers; most stations carry Estrella TV on a digital subchannel solely in 480i standard definition and scale the signal down for that format. Although most series aired on the network produced before 2012 and "television" cuts of most films released before 2005 were originally formatted in 4:3, the network presents these programs in anamorphic widescreen by default; however, the network airs most commercials in their original picture format whenever possible. The national cable/satellite feed uses Liberman's Estrella station in Miami, WVFW-LD, as its signal source.

Although the network prefers traditional over-the-air distribution with supplementary carriage on cable and satellite providers, Estrella TV's programming is available in other areas of the United States through a national cable network feed that is distributed directly to select cable, direct-broadcast satellite and IPTV providers (such as Time Warner Cable, Cablevision, Charter and Verizon FiOS) – particularly on dedicated Spanish language programming tiers which incorporate other networks that operate direct-to-pay-television feeds (such as Univision and Telemundo) – as an alternative method of distribution in markets without either the availability or the demand for a local owned-and-operated or affiliate station of the network due to its smaller Hispanic population density.

Although most of Estrella TV's local affiliates carry the entire schedule, some pre-empt certain programs within the network's lineup in order to air newscasts or public affairs programs (such as with Los Angeles flagship station KRCA and KXAP-LD in Tulsa, Oklahoma); some also pre-empt paid programs within the network's overnight and early-morning infomercial block (such as with KOCY-LD in Oklahoma City) with other locally produced or brokered programming, or to move English-language network programming over due to breaking news situations on the affiliate's main signal (as WSVN in Miami did during Hurricane Irma in 2017 with Fox and Fox Sports programming; as mentioned above, Libermann maintains the owned WVFW-LD to air all network programming in Miami, but continues their affiliation agreement with WSVN-DT2 for full-market coverage).

== Controversies ==
=== Indecency complaints concerning José Luis Sin Censura ===
On February 28, 2011, the Gay and Lesbian Alliance Against Defamation (GLAAD) and the National Hispanic Media Coalition (NHMC) filed a 200-page joint indecency complaint with the Federal Communications Commission (FCC) against Liberman Broadcasting and Estrella TV's Los Angeles flagship station KRCA, in response to content featured on the conflict talk show José Luis Sin Censura (or José Luis Uncensored, an hour-long tabloid talk show hosted by José Luis Gonzalez), due to repeated instances of verbal and physical abuse against LGBT and female guests.

The two organizations also provided transcripts, video clips and still photographs allegedly sourced from the program (in more than 20 different episodes that aired between June 18 and December 7, 2010) to help illustrate the allegations described in the complaint, which featured pixellated nudity, various censored and uncensored profanity, anti-gay slurs and violent outbursts from angry audience members. GLAAD president Jarrett Barrios said in a statement regarding the offending content: "For years[,] Liberman has ignored concerns from viewers as well as revenue loss from advertisers pulling spots. This material is some of the most violent and offensive on television today and the FCC should hold the broadcaster responsible for airing material which is putting gay and lesbian people in harm's way." GLAAD stated that representatives for the LGBT advocacy organization had met with Liberman executives in 2005, about excising the profanity, slurs and violent acts, but did not have their request granted, and acknowledged that several advertisers pulled advertising from the program following the previous campaign to tone down the content. Following the FCC filing, GLAAD subsequently partnered with the Women's Media Center to launch an online campaign to urge supporters of the complaint to e-mail the Commission in support of or to file their own individual complaints. In referencing to the extremity of the content, NHMC president Alex Nogales referred in an announcement of the complaint, "José Luis makes Jerry Springer look like Mr. Rogers." More than 30 organizations also responded in the demand for Liberman to take action in regards of the program. According to GLAAD President Jarrett Barrios, "This show serves no role except to fuel a climate of intolerance and violence against our community. The FCC has an obligation to stand up against this offensive program, which has no place on our airwaves."

The groups subsequently launched a boycott against companies that maintained advertising sponsorships for José Luis Sin Censura, and created a petition on Change.org urging Liberman to take action regarding the show and its content. In response to the controversy, AT&T and Time Warner Cable withdrew their advertising from the program. In addition, Miami affiliate WSVN opted to pre-empt José Luis Sin Censura from its Estrella TV feed on digital channel 7.2, while KCTU-LD in Wichita, Kansas disaffiliated the network from one of its subchannels in late 2010, with the station's general manager Ron Nutt citing the network's programming in general "was so objectionable that, at one point or another, half of its viewership had called us with a complaint. They are going for sensationalism. If an English-language network put out this content, they would be asking for trouble." On August 8, 2012, Estrella TV agreed to officially cancel José Luis Sin Censura, immediately pulling the show from its schedule.

On November 15, 2013, the FCC's Enforcement Bureau filed an indecency enforcement action against Liberman Broadcasting, in which the company voluntarily agreed to pay $110,000 to settle the indecency complaints filed by GLAAD, the NHMC and others as part of a consent decree.

=== Carriage dispute with Comcast ===
In February 2015, during negotiations to renew its carriage agreement for Estrella TV's owned-and-operated stations in Denver (KETD), Houston (KZJL) and Salt Lake City (KPNZ), Liberman Broadcasting entered into a carriage dispute with Comcast over carriage fees and expanded distribution to all markets served by the provider's Xfinity service in 13 other markets. Chief executive officer Lenard Liberman cited that it was seeking to switch from must carry status for the network's carriage to a retransmission consent compensation model; he also cited concerns that Comcast's since-aborted merger with Time Warner Cable would result in the provider exerting too much leverage in programming deals, resulting in it favoring networks the company owns (such as Telemundo) over minority-owned networks (an issue cited in a $20 billion racial discrimination lawsuit filed by Entertainment Studios and the National Association of African-American Owned Media that month over its alleged favoring of The Africa Channel, a minority-owned founded by former Comcast/NBCUniversal executive Paula Madison, over other black-owned networks). Estrella TV launched an on-air and social media campaign on February 7, asking viewers to urge Comcast to continue carrying the network; however, representatives for Comcast countered that it expanded distribution of 60 independently operated Hispanic-focused networks (such as Univision-owned Galavisión, HITN and Azteca) across its systems (as part of an agreement resulting from its 2011 merger with Telemundo parent NBCUniversal), and while it was negotiating in good faith with Liberman, it did not want to raise subscriber rates to carry a network with "limited [viewer] appeal".

In response, on February 11, California Rep. Tony Cárdenas circulated a letter to other U.S. House members, asking them to write to the Federal Communications Commission and the U.S. Department of Justice to ensure that independent programmers would not be harmed should the Comcast-TWC merger receive federal approval. KETD, KZJL and KPNZ were all removed from Comcast's systems in the respective markets upon the agreement's expiration at 12:00 a.m. Eastern Time on February 20; however, its stations in the 13 other markets where Comcast serves as a major cable provider (including New York City, Chicago, Miami and Fresno) were unaffected due to separate carriage agreements. On September 27, 2017, Liberman Broadcasting elected to give KETD, KZJL, and KPNZ must carry status effective on New Year's Day 2018, ultimately conceding defeat in its attempt to receive carriage fees from Comcast, although it declared it would continue litigation relating to Estrella TV's availability outside those markets.
