= Copa de la Diversión =

American Minor League Baseball initiative

Copa de la Diversión logo

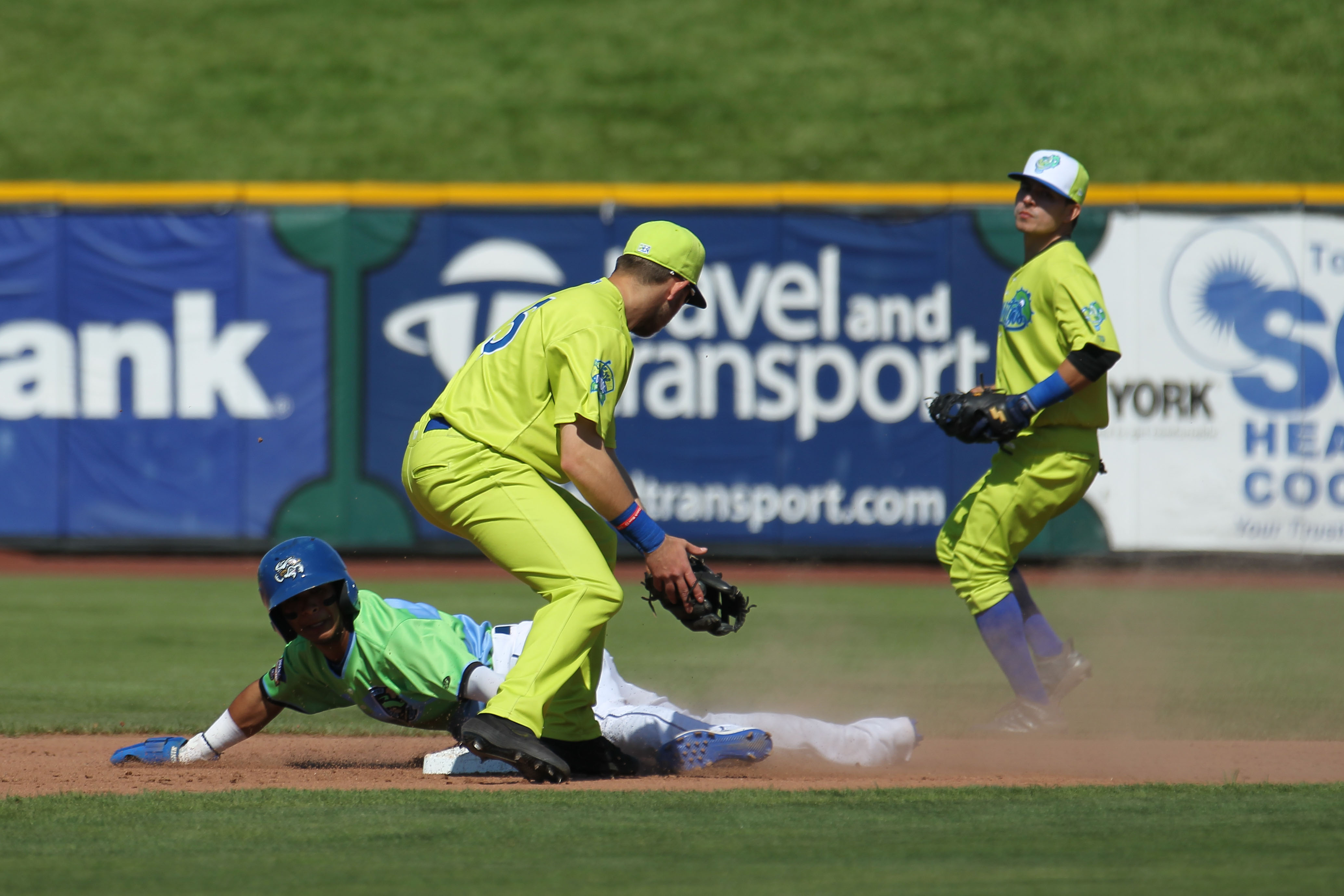
A 2019 Copa game between the Margaritas de El Paso (yellow) and Cazadores de Tormentas de Omaha (green)

Copa de la Diversión (transl. Fun Cup) is an initiative by Minor League Baseball to promote the sport and connect its teams to their Hispanic/Latino communities. Teams adopt a culturally-relevant on-field persona for certain games each season.

== History ==
The promotion started in 2017 with the Es Divertido Ser Un Fan ("It's Fun to Be a Fan") fan engagement program. Four teams participated: the Las Vegas 51s, who took the field as the Reyes de Plata ("Silver Kings"); the Charlotte Knights as the Charlotte Caballeros; the Visalia Rawhide, who played as the Visalia Toros; and the Kane County Cougars, who did not change their name for the promotion.

In 2018, the program was renamed Copa de la Diversión and expanded to 33 teams. A trophy (the "Fun Cup") was awarded to the Albuquerque Isotopes franchise, who played as the Mariachis de Nuevo México and set new attendance records during Copa games. In 2019, participation increased to 72 teams. Six teams that participated in 2018 using direct Spanish translations of their usual team name adopted new identities for 2019. The number of participants increased to 92 for the 2020 season.

In addition to changing monikers for Copa games, teams also utilize alternate logos, color schemes, jerseys, and hats. The re-branding inspirations have ranged from historical, such as the Reyes de Plata in reference to the contributions migrant workers made to the mining industry of Nevada, to culinary, with the Columbia Fireflies playing as the Chicharrones de Columbia.

The 2020 minor league season was cancelled due to the COVID-19 pandemic. Following the 2020 season, Major League Baseball assumed control of Minor League Baseball in a move to increase player salaries, modernize facility standards, and reduce travel. This reorganization and elimination of some teams reduced Copa participants to 76 clubs in 2021. Following the 2021 season, the Worcester Red Sox, who played Copa games as "Los Wepas de Worcester", were awarded the Fun Cup trophy.

In 2022, participation grew to 85 teams.

In 2024, Minor League Baseball reached an agreement with Estrella TV to air select games from the tournament.

== Participating teams ==
Participating teams
Copa name	Official name	Class	League	Start	Notes	Ref.
Abejas de Salt Lake	Salt Lake Bees	Triple-A	Pacific Coast League	2018	Bees	
Alces de Maine	Portland Sea Dogs	Double-A	Eastern League	2020	Moose (of Maine)	
Alebrijes de Modesto	Modesto Nuts	Class A	California League	2019	Alebrijes	
Ardillas Voladoras de Richmond	Richmond Flying Squirrels	Double-A	Eastern League	2019	Flying Squirrels	
Avocados Luchadores de Down East (Note: Down East competed as the "Patos Joyuyos de Down East" in 2019)	Down East Wood Ducks	Class A	Carolina League	2020	Fighting Avocados (of Down East)	
Bandidos del Río de las Ciudades Cuádruples	Quad Cities River Bandits	High-A	Midwest League	2022	River Bandits of the Quadruple Cities	
Boise Papas Fritas	Boise Hawks	independent baseball league	Pioneer League	2020	French Fries	
Bólidos de Bowling Green	Bowling Green Hot Rods	High-A	South Atlantic League	2020	Race Cars	
Duraznos de Roma	Rome Emperors	High-A	South Atlantic League	2024	Peaches	
Bradenton Barbanegras	Bradenton Marauders	Class A	Florida State League	2019	Blackbeards	
Brooklyn Jefes	Brooklyn Cyclones	High-A	South Atlantic League	2018	Bosses -- may refer to either crime bosses or political bosses	
Caballeros de Charlotte	Charlotte Knights	Triple-A	International League	2017	Knights or Gentlemen	
Caballos de Stockton	Stockton Ports	Class A	California League	2018	Horses	
Cabritos Maldichos de South Bend	South Bend Cubs	High-A	Midwest League	2020	Cursed Goats -- refers to the Curse of the Billy Goat	
Calaveras de West Michigan	West Michigan Whitecaps	High-A	Midwest League	2019	Skulls	
Cangrejos Fantasmas de Chesapeake	Bowie Baysox	Double-A	Eastern League	2018	Ghost Crabs	
Cardenales de Springfield	Springfield Cardinals	Double-A	Texas League	2020	Cardinals (the bird)	
Cascabeles de Wisconsin	Wisconsin Timber Rattlers	High-A	Midwest League	2019	Rattlesnakes or Jingle Bells	
Cazadores de Tormentas de Omaha	Omaha Storm Chasers	Triple-A	International League	2018	Storm Chasers	
Toros Bravos de Durham (Note: Durham competed as the "Toros de Durham" in 2017 and 2018.) (Note: Durham competed as the "Mal de Ojo de Durham" in 2019.)	Durham Bulls	Triple-A	International League	2020	Brave Bulls	
Chicharrones de Columbia	Columbia Fireflies	Class A	Carolina League	2019	Chicharrones	
Chivos de Hartford	Hartford Yard Goats	Double-A	Eastern League	2018	Goats	
Chupacabras de Round Rock	Round Rock Express	Triple-A	Pacific Coast League	2018	Chupacabras	
Churros de San José (Note: San Jose competed as the "San Jose Gigantes" in 2018.)	San Jose Giants	Class A	California League	2019	Churros	
Cielo Azul de Oklahoma City	Oklahoma City Dodgers	Triple-A	Pacific Coast League	2018	Blue Sky -- refers to the blue skies of Oklahoma. Also alludes to the color Dodger blue from parent organization the Los Angeles Dodgers and former Dodgers player Fernando Valenzuela—a Mexican-born pitcher who distinctively looked to the sky during his wind-up.	
Cocos Locos de Rochester	Rochester Red Wings	Triple-A	International League	2020	Crazy Coconuts	
Cóndores de Binghamton	Binghamton Rumble Ponies	Double-A	Eastern League	2023	Condors	
Dulces de Sugar Land	Sugar Land Space Cowboys	Triple-A	Pacific Coast League	2023	Sweets or Candies	
Congueros de Syracuse	Syracuse Mets	Triple-A	International League	2022	A conguero is one who plays the conga drum, an instrument played throughout Latin countries but originating in Cuba.	
Conquistadores de Everett	Everett AquaSox	High-A	Northwest League	2018	Conquerors	
Peces Dorados de Altoona	Altoona Curve	Double-A	Eastern League	2024	Golden Fish	
Corpus Christi Cumbias (Note: Corpus Christi competed as the "Raspas de Corpus Christi" from 2018 to 2021.)	Corpus Christi Hooks	Double-A	Texas League	2022	Cumbias	
Coquís de Lehigh Valley (Note: Lehigh Valley competed as the "Lehigh Valley Tocino" in 2018.)	Lehigh Valley IronPigs	Triple-A	International League	2019	Coquís	
Cucuys de San Bernardino	Inland Empire 66ers	Class A	California League	2018	Boogeymen (see coco)	
Demonios de Des Moines	Iowa Cubs	Triple-A	International League	2019	Demons	
Diamantes de Arkansas	Arkansas Travelers	Double-A	Texas League	2019	Diamonds	
Dorados de Sacramento	Sacramento River Cats	Triple-A	Pacific Coast League	2018	Golden Ones	
Familia de Tacoma	Tacoma Rainiers	Triple-A	Pacific Coast League	2019	Family	
Fenómenos Enmascarados del Valle de Hudson	Hudson Valley Renegades	High-A	South Atlantic League	2020	Masked Phenoms -- a reference to the masks worn during Lucha libre wrestling	
Flying Chanclas de San Antonio	San Antonio Missions	Double-A	Texas League	2018	flying flip-flops (see flip-flops in popular culture)	
Fundadores de Fredericksburg	Fredericksburg Nationals	Single-A	Carolina League	2023	Founders -- a reference to the Founding Fathers of the United States	
Gallos de Delmarva	Delmarva Shorebirds	Class A	Carolina League	2019	Roosters (of the Delmarva Peninsula)	
Luces de Buffalo	Buffalo Bisons	Triple-A	International League	2024	Lights of Buffalo -- a reference to the Pan-American Exposition, a World's Fair held in Buffalo in 1901, and the electrification of the exposition.	
Gatos Feroces de New Hampshire	New Hampshire Fisher Cats	Double-A	Eastern League	2019	Ferocious Cats -- a reference to Jaguars in Mesoamerican cultures	
Granos de Cedar Rapids	Cedar Rapids Kernels	High-A	Midwest League	2023	Grains or kernels of corn	
Guerreros de Fayetteville	Fayetteville Woodpeckers	Class A	Carolina League	2020	Warriors -- a reference to local Fort Bragg, one of the world's largest military installations	
Llamas de Hickory	Hickory Crawdads	High-A	South Atlantic League	2019	Llamas	
Lecheros de Milwaukee	Milwaukee Milkmen	independent baseball league	American Association of Professional Baseball	2023	Milkmen	
Lehigh Valley Mamajuana	Lehigh Valley IronPigs	Triple-A	International League	2023	Mama Juana	
Limonadas de Hill City	Lynchburg Hillcats	Single-A	Carolina League	2023	Lemonades	
Lloronas de Montaña Rocosa	Rocky Mountain Vibes	independent baseball league	Pioneer League	2020	Weepers -- a reference to La Llorona	
Locos de Lansing	Lansing Lugnuts	High-A	Midwest League	2019	Crazies	
Los Puentes de Tri-City	Tri-City ValleyCats	independent baseball league	Frontier League	2020	Bridges	
Lowriders de Fresno	Fresno Grizzlies	Class A	California League	2019	lowriders	
Luchadores de Reading (Note: Reading competed as the "Peleadores de Reading" in 2019.)	Reading Fightin Phils	Double-A	Eastern League	2020	Lucha libre wrestlers	
Lunáticos de Rocket City	Rocket City Trash Pandas	Double-A	Southern League	2020	Lunatics	
Margaritas de El Paso (Note: El Paso competed as the "El Paso Chihuahuas" in 2018.)	El Paso Chihuahuas	Triple-A	Pacific Coast League	2019	Margaritas -- reference to the cocktail, which traces its origins to the El Paso-Juárez region.	
Mariachis de Nuevo México	Albuquerque Isotopes	Triple-A	Pacific Coast League	2018	mariachis of New Mexico	
Midland Amigos (Note: Midland competed as the "Matamoscas de Midessa" from 2019 to 2023.)	Midland RockHounds	Double-A	Texas League	2024	Friends	
Medusas de Jersey Shore (Note: Jersey Shore competed as the "Medusas de Lakewood" from 2019 to 2020.)	Jersey Shore BlueClaws	High-A	South Atlantic League	2021	Jellyfish	
Micheladas de Reno	Reno Aces	Triple-A	Pacific Coast League	2023	micheladas	
Monarcas de Eugene	Eugene Emeralds	High-A	Northwest League	2018	Monarch butterflies	
Montañas de Chattanooga	Chattanooga Lookouts	Double-A	Southern League	2019	Mountains -- reference to the Appalachian Mountains	
Murciélagos de Louisville	Louisville Bats	Triple-A	International League	2019	Bats (the animal)	
Música de Memphis (Note: Memphis did not participate from 2020 to 2021.)	Memphis Redbirds	Triple-A	International League	2018	Music	
Naturales del Noroeste de Arkansas	Northwest Arkansas Naturals	Double-A	Texas League	2020	Naturals -- a reference to the natural beauty found in Northwest Arkansas	
Ocelotes de Greensboro	Greensboro Grasshoppers	High-A	South Atlantic League	2019	ocelots	
Oso Pardo de Gateway	Gateway Grizzlies	independent baseball league	Frontier League	2023	Grizzlies	
Pajaritos de Norfolk	Norfolk Tides	Triple-A	International League	2019	Baby birds	
Paletas de Beloit	Beloit Sky Carp	High-A	Midwest League	2023	paletas	
Pavos Salvajes de Augusta	Augusta GreenJackets	Single-A	Carolina League	2023	Wild Turkeys	
Pelícanos de Myrtle Beach	Myrtle Beach Pelicans	Class A	Carolina League	2019	Pelicans	
Pensacola Pok-Ta-Pok	Pensacola Blue Wahoos	Double-A	Southern League	2023	pok-ta-pok	
Perros Bomberos de Peoria (Note: Peoria competed as "En El Rio" from 2020 to 2023.)	Peoria Chiefs	High-A	Midwest League	2020	Fire Dogs	
Pepinillos Picantes del Norte	Great Lakes Loons	High-A	Midwest League	2022	Spicy Pickles of the North	
Perros Calientes de Akron	Akron RubberDucks	Double-A	Eastern League	2021	Hot dogs	
Perros Santos de Charleston	Charleston RiverDogs	Class A	Carolina League	2019	Holy dogs	
Pescados de Carolina	Carolina Mudcats	Class A	Carolina League	2019	Fish	
Picantes de Lake County	Lake County Captains	High-A	Midwest League	2019	Spicy ones	
Piñatas de Erie	Erie SeaWolves	Double-A	Eastern League	2019	piñatas	
Playeros de Harrisburg	Harrisburg Senators	Double-A	Eastern League	2020	Beachgoers	
Pointy Boots de Amarillo	Amarillo Sod Poodles	Double-A	Texas League	2020	Pointy boots	
Los Quesos de Frisco	Frisco RoughRiders	Double-A	Texas League	2022	Cheeses	
Ranas de Rio (Note: Greenville competed as the "Energía de Greenville" from 2018 to 2020.)	Greenville Drive	High-A	South Atlantic League	2021	River frogs	
Rápidos de Kannapolis	Kannapolis Cannon Ballers (Note: The Kannapolis Cannon Ballers were known as the Kannapolis Intimidators in 2018 and 2019.)	Class A	Carolina League	2018	Rapids	
Reyes de Plata de Las Vegas	Las Vegas Aviators (Note: The Las Vegas Aviators were known as the Las Vegas 51s in 2017 and 2018.)	Triple-A	Pacific Coast League	2017	Silver Kings honors migrant workers in the silver mining industry who helped Nevada earn its "Silver State" nickname.	
Rumberos de Daytona	Daytona Tortugas	Single-A	Florida State League	2023	Partygoers (see also rumba)	
Salsa de Winston-Salem (Note: Winton-Salem competed as the "Rayados de Winston-Salem" from 2018 to 2021.)	Winston-Salem Dash	High-A	South Atlantic League	2018	salsa	
San Bernardos de Salem	Salem Red Sox	Class A	Carolina League	2019	St. Bernards (dog)	
Santos de San Pablo	St. Paul Saints	Triple-A	International League	2022	Saints of St. Paul	
Soñadores de Hillsboro (Note: Hillsboro competed as the "Lúpulos de Hillsboro" in 2018.)	Hillsboro Hops	High-A	Northwest League	2019	"Soñadores" translates to "Dreamers" and its Copa logo is an Alebrije with embedded graduation caps and a tail that symbolizes the flame on the Statue of Liberty.	
Chaquetas de Rancho Cucamonga (Note: Rancho Cucamonga competed as the "Temblores de Rancho Cucamonga" from 2018 to 2023.)	Rancho Cucamonga Quakes	Class A	California League	2024	Jackets (particularly those worn as part of a Mariachi outfit)	
Toros Bravos de Durham	Durham Bulls	Triple-A	International League	2023	Brave Bulls (or fighting bulls)	
Toros de Visalia	Visalia Rawhide	Class A	California League	2017	Bulls	
Tumba Vacas de Wichita	Wichita Wind Surge	Double-A	Texas League	2022	Grave cows	
Vejigantes de Scranton/Wilkes-Barre	Scranton/Wilkes-Barre RailRiders	Triple-A	International League	2019	Vejigantes	
Veleros de Columbus	Columbus Clippers	Triple-A	International League	2019	Clipper ships	
Vihuelas de Nashville	Nashville Sounds	Triple-A	International League	2019 (Note: Nashville did not participate in 2021.)	The vihuela, a high-pitched Mexican guitar popular with Mariachi groups, reflected Nashville's musical heritage.	
Viñeros de Tri-City	Tri-City Dust Devils	High-A	Northwest League	2019	Vineyard workers	
Cafecitos de Spokane	Spokane Indians	High-A	Northwest League	2024	Little Coffee or "Coffee Talk"	
Los Wepas de Worcester	Worcester Red Sox	Triple-A	International League	2021	"¡Wepa!" is a Puerto Rican slang term used to express excitement, similar to saying "Woo-hoo!"	
Xolos de Gwinnett	Gwinnett Stripers	Triple-A	International League	2019	Xolos (as in Xoloitzcuintle)	
Yacumamas de Asheville	Asheville Tourists	High-A	South Atlantic League	2020	Yacumama	
Rocas Azules de Wilmington	Wilmington Blue Rocks	High-A	South Atlantic League	2024	Blue Rocks -- a reference to the blue granite found along the Brandywine River	
Zorros de Somerset	Somerset Patriots	Double-A	Eastern League	2022	Foxes	

== Former identities ==
Copa name	Official name	Class	League	Season(s)	Notes	Ref(s).
Cadejos de Lake Elsinore	Lake Elsinore Storm	Class A-Advanced	California League	2019–2020	Cadejos	
Campesinos de Salem-Keizer	Salem-Keizer Volcanoes	Class A Short Season	Northwest League	2020	Farmers	
Carnívoros de Ogden	Ogden Raptors	Rookie	Pioneer League	2020	Carnivores	
Cervezas de Durham	Durham Bulls	Triple-A	International League	2020	Beers	
Cinco Estaciones de Cedar Rapids	Cedar Rapid Kernels	High-A	Midwest League	2020	Five Seasons -- a reference to Cedar Rapids's nickname, "the City of Five Seasons"	
Clinton Elotes	Clinton LumberKings	Class A	Midwest League	2019–2020	Corn cobs -- see elote	
Coquís de Florida	Florida Fire Frogs	Class A-Advanced	Florida State League	2019–2020	Coquís	
Coquís de Lehigh Valley	Lehigh Valley IronPigs	Triple-A	International League	2019	Coquís	
Corazones de Reno	Reno Aces	Triple-A	Pacific Coast League	2019	Hearts	
El Paso Chihuahuas	El Paso Chihuahuas	Triple-A	Pacific Coast League	2018	The Chihuahuas retained their official moniker and logo, but utilized an alternate color scheme.	
Energía de Greenville	Greenville Drive	Class A	South Atlantic League	2018–2020	Energy	
Frijoles Saltarines de Puerto Carlota	Charlotte Stone Crabs	Class A-Advanced	Florida State League	2020	Jumping Beans of Port Charlotte	
Kane County Cougars	Kane County Cougars	Class A	Midwest League	2017–2020	Cougars	
Lake Elsinore Storm	Lake Elsinore Storm	Class A-Advanced	California League	2018	The Storm retained their official moniker and logo, but utilized an alternate color scheme.	
Lehigh Valley Tocino	Lehigh Valley IronPigs	Triple-A	International League	2018	Bacon	
Leyendas de Lexington	Lexington Legends	Class A	South Atlantic League	2019–2020	Legends	
Lúpulos de Hillsboro	Hillsboro Hops	Class A Short Season	Northwest League	2018	Hops	
Madres de Idaho Falls	Idaho Falls Chukars	Rookie	Pioneer League	2020	Mothers	
Mal de Ojo de Durham	Durham Bulls	Triple-A	International League	2019	The Evil Eye -- see evil eye	
Manzanas Luchadores de Fort Wayne	Fort Wayne TinCaps	Class A	Midwest League	2020	Fighting Apples	
Molinos de Burlington	Burlington Royals	Rookie	Appalachian League	2020	Mills -- a reference to the historic textile mill industry in the area	
Osos Polares de Pawtucket	Pawtucket Red Sox	Triple-A	International League	2019–2020	Polar Bears	
Patos Joyuyos de Down East	Down East Wood Ducks	Class A-Advanced	Carolina League	2019	Jeweled Ducks	
Peleadores de Reading	Reading Fightin Phils	Double-A	Eastern League	2019	Fighters (or Brawlers)	
Petroleros de Tulsa	Tulsa Drillers	Double-A	Texas League	2018–2019	Oilmen	
Puentes de Tri-City	Tri-City Valleycats	Single-A	New York–Penn League	2020	Bridges over the Hudson River	
Raspas de Corpus Christi	Corpus Christi Hooks	Double-A	Texas League	2018–2021	Scrapers (refers to shaved ice)	
Rayados de Winston-Salem	Winston-Salem Dash	High-A	South Atlantic League	2018–2021	Striped Ones	
San Jose Gigantes	San Jose Giants	Class A-Advanced	California League	2018	Giants	
Toros de Durham	Durham Bulls	Triple-A	International League	2017–2018	Bulls	
Tortugas de Daytona	Daytona Tortugas	Class A	Florida State League	2018	Turtles	
Trueno de Trenton	Trenton Thunder	Double-A	Eastern League	2019–2020	Thunder	
Viento de Lancaster	Lancaster JetHawks	Class A-Advanced	California League	2019–2020	Wind	
