= Alexander Gurevich (TV presenter) =

Russian TV presenter

- Алекса́ндр Вита́льевич Гуре́вич
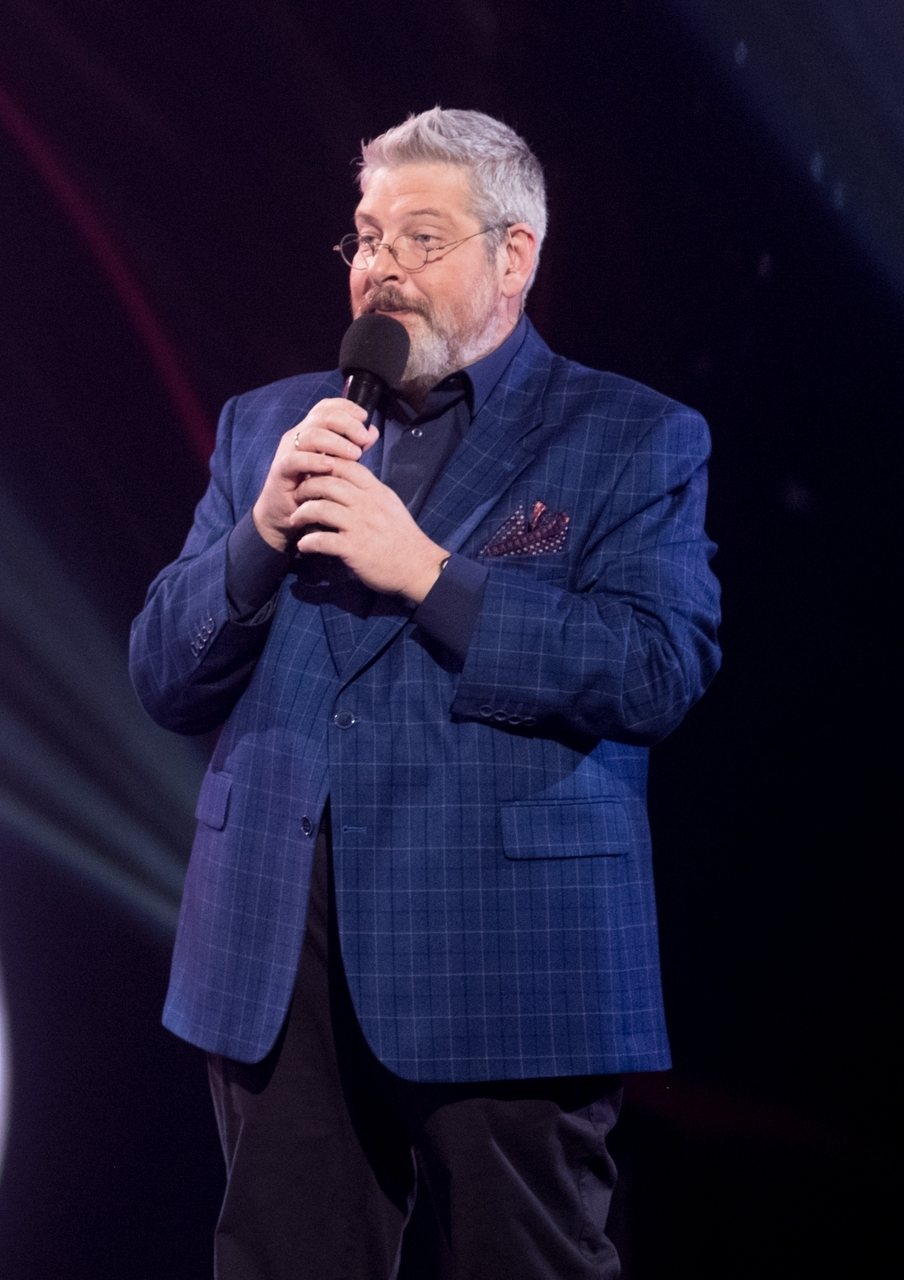
- Born: Alexander Vitalievich Gurevich; May 25, 1964 (age 62); Moscow, RSFSR, Soviet Union
- Citizenship: Moscow
- Occupations: TV presenter, producer, showman, director, TV director, producer
- Years active: 1984–present
- Spouse: Galina Lerman (after 1987)
- Children: daughter Maria (born 1991)
- Awards: TEFI Award

Alexander Vitalievich Gurevich (Russian: Алекса́ндр Вита́льевич Гуре́вич; born May 25, 1964, Moscow, USSR) is a Russian TV presenter, showman, producer and director. The host and creative director of the game show Hundred to One (1995–2022), a TEFI Award Laureate (1997, 2002).

He was born in an intelligent Jewish family. His grandparents were born in Western Belarus, his paternal ancestors lived in the Czech Republic.

He first appeared on television in 1984 and was the presenter of Russian versions of Child's Play, The Chase and The Brain. In 1996, he was the author of the concept and director of Boris Yeltsin's election videos. He commented the Junior Eurovision Song Contest 2013 and Junior Eurovision Song Contest 2014 from the Russian side (together with Olga Shelest).

In February 2022, he opposed the Russian invasion of Ukraine, making a series of comments on latest videos of Hundred to One's official YouTube channel. Some time later, all the episodes on this channel were removed, and Gurevich later quit.
