= FamiliaDA =

- Starring: Cosmin Seleși
- Country of origin: Romania
- Original language: Romanian

Production
- Running time: 30 minutes

Original release
- Network: Antena 1
- Release: 2012 – 2014

FamiliaDA (Family Olympics) is the Romanian version of Family Feud. It started airing the show in 2012 until 2014 on Antena 1. It is hosted by the actor Cosmin Seleși. It is shown on every Friday, Saturday and Sunday at 20:00.

Since 2015, the show is now rebooted as Ce Spun Românii (What Say the Romanians?) on Pro TV hosted by Cabral Ibacka. In addition, while FamiliaDA had five members of two teams, Ce Spun Românii only has four members of two teams. However, it came back to the original five members of two teams format since 2017. The set and logo were also inspired for the Czech Republican version called Co na to Češi (What do Czechs) a remake of 5 proti 5 (5 vs./Against 5 not to be confused with the Slovak version of the same name) hosted by Tomáš Matonoha on TV Nova since 2016.

== Rules ==
Rules are roughly the same as the original US version. After three questions, the winning family played for 10,000 lei.
