= ¿Qué dice la gente? =

Television series

- Genre: Game Show
- Based on: Family Feud by Mark Goodson
- Presented by: Marco Antonio Regil; Omar Chaparro
- Announcer: Julio Cesar Palomera
- Country of origin: United States
- Original language: Spanish
- No. of episodes: 635

Production
- Running time: 30 minutes
- Production company: FremantleMedia

Original release
- Network: TeleFutura
- Release: June 12, 2006 – November 14, 2008

Related
- 100 mexicanos dijeron

¿Qué dice la gente? (or What Do People Say?) is a Spanish-language adaptation of the American game show Family Feud which was produced in the United States, that aired on Spanish-language channel Telefutura (now UniMás) in 2006. It was itself the American version of Mexican game show, 100 mexicanos dijeron, originally hosted by Marco Antonio Regil for two seasons from 2006 until 2008 followed by Omar Chaparro who took over for the last nine weeks of the series when it was filmed in Miami. Jackie Vilarino and Survivor: Nicaragua Contestant Brenda Lowe both served as co-hosts for the show's run. The show premiered on June 12, 2006, and ended on November 14, 2008. In 2008, the show was reduced to a half-hour in order to pair up with the Spanish-language version of the short-lived 1982-83 American game show Child's Play under the name Dame la Pista or (Give Me a Clue) hosted by Alessandra Rosaldo, but it was ultimately cancelled along with ¿Qué dice la gente? for "unknown" reasons.

== Game format ==
The game is played by two families of five members. They are posed survey-style questions previously answered by one hundred people and try to guess the answers that they gave. More popular answers are worth more points; only answers given by at least two people are included on the board. Winning families can stay on the show for five days.

As it is intended for Spanish-speaking audiences, the American-based show does not limit its contestants to Mexicans, but all Latino families (one episode had a family from Spain on the show). As the show draws its contestants from an American viewer base, some members of Hispanic-American families playing may occasionally use an English word for the answer, which Marco, the host, then translates.

=== Main game ===
At the beginning of the round, two family members face off to see which family will gain control of that particular question. Traditionally, they greet each other with a handshake before the question is read. Whoever provides the more popular answer in the survey has the control of the question. If neither player gives a valid answer, the next member of each family gets a chance to answer with control again going to the family giving the most popular answer. If both answers are worth the same number of points, control goes to the player that buzzed in first.

The family in control then attempts to provide all the remaining answers on the board. Starting with the next family member in line, each takes turns providing an answer. The family gets a "strike" if they give an answer that is not on the board or if the member currently answering stalls too long without providing an answer. Three strikes cause the family to relinquish control and then the other family gets a chance to steal the points accumulated by providing one of the remaining answers; if they fail, the family who chose to take turns answering the question receives the points. The family may discuss which answer they will give beforehand. Any remaining answers are then revealed. Per tradition, the audience yells each unrevealed answer in unison.

There are three single value questions, one double, and if necessary, a triple. The first family to achieve three hundred points (or more) wins the game. If neither family has three hundred points after five questions, a sixth is played for triple value, and only the top answer is given.

=== Dinero Rápido (Fast Money) ===
The winning family chooses two family members to play. One family member leaves the stage and is placed in an isolation booth, while the other is given 15 seconds (20 in December 2006) to answer five survey questions. If they can't think up an answer to any particular question, they may pass and come back to the question at the end, time permitting. The number of people giving each answer is then revealed answer by answer after the player is finished answering or time has expired. The player earns one point for each person that gave the same answer; at least two people must have given that answer for it to appear on the board.

Once all the points for the first player are tallied, the second family member comes back on stage and is given 20 seconds (25 in December 2006) to answer the same five questions. The host will ask for another response should an answer be duplicated.

If one or both family members accumulate a total of 200 points or more, the family wins $5,000. If the family gets 200 points and gives the top answer in each question, they win $6,000. If the family scores less than 200 but gives the top answer in each question, they win $1,000 ($2,000 in December 2007). If the team scores less than 200, they win $500.

On June 12, 2006, when the show was expanded to a full-hour format, an extra element was added to the second "Dinero Rapido", "La canasta de tentacion" ("the basket of temptation/temptation basket"), a basket full of items, attached to each of which is a flag saying one of the following:

- Buena suerte ("good luck"): Simply means "good luck" and has no other effect.
- $500: The family playing gains $500.
- Puntos extra ("extra points"): The family gains anywhere from five to fifty extra points. It is only truly effective if the family's score is at least 150 points.
- El Doble ("the double"): The family plays for $10,000. They win $11,000 ($12,000 in December 2007) if they gain two hundred points and give the top answer in each question.
- El Triple ("the triple"): The family plays for $15,000. They win $16,000 ($17,000 in December 2007) if they gain two hundred points and give the top answer in each question. Added in April 2007.

=== Second season ===
The show's second season made its premiere on September 15, 2008, with Omar Chaparro as the new host. Ratings declined and the show was cancelled after nine weeks.

== ¿Qué dice la gente? VIP ==
On occasion, celebrities or other non-civilian teams play for charity. On these shows, the winning team plays for $10,000. Both teams earn a minimum of $5,000.

== Second Chance tournament ==
The weeks of July 16 and July 30, 2007, QDLG held its first tournament, featuring four non-winning families. All money won in Dinero Rapido went into a jackpot, starting at $15,000 with a maximum of $143,000 (assuming all eight families drew the El Triple from "La canasta de tentacion", then scored 200 points and gave the #1 answer for each question). On Monday and Tuesday, the four families faceoff in two quarterfinal rounds, with standard rules. The two winners face off on Wednesday and Thursday, playing two complete semi-final games within the hour, again with standard rules. The two losers from those games play a consolation game for $5,000 in the first half-hour of Friday's show, while the winners play a seven-round, 600-point game for the jackpot; the first four rounds are single value, the rest triple.

== Tournament of Champions ==
On March 24, 2008, QDLC held their first ToC, featuring 8 top-winning families. The same rules applied from the second chance tournament, with no "La canasta de tentacion" ("The Basket of Temptation/Temptation Basket"), and a top prize of up to $80,000.

== Revival/Remake ==
On September 9, 2013, a new Spanish-language version of the show aired on MundoFox (now "MundoMax" since 2015) under the name 100 latinos dijeron (100 Latins Said) also hosted by Marco Antonio Regil. It was cancelled on November 30, 2016, due to the dissolution of the MundoMax (formerly MundoFox) network. Three years later, it was revived on Estrella TV in 2019, originally hosted by Armando Hernández then was replaced by Mau Nieto.

On October 2, 2022, an all-star celebrity version based on the 2015 American version of Celebrity Family Feud under the name ¿Qué Dicen los Famosos? (What Do Celebrities Say?) hosted by Rodrigo Vidal airs on Telemundo.

== International versions ==
Country	Local name	Host	Network	Air Dates
Uruguay	¿Que dice la gente?	Humberto de Vargas	Saeta TV	2008
Venezuela	Qué dice la gente	Maite Delgado	Venevisión	2002
Ecuador	100 latinos dijeron	Marco Antonio Regil	Ecuavisa	2015
Bolivia	100 Bolivianos dicen	Ronico Cuéllar	Red UNO	2023
