= Family Feud Malaysia Tamil =

- Genre: Game show
- Based on: Family Feud
- Presented by: Dr. J. Ram
- Country of origin: Malaysia
- Original language: Tamil

Production
- Production locations: Bukit Jalil, Malaysia
- Camera setup: Multiple-camera setup
- Running time: 50 minutes
- Production company: Astro Malaysia Holding

Original release
- Network: Astro Vinmeen HD
- Release: 3 May 2023 – present

Family Feud Tamil (Tamil: பேமிலி பியூட்டி மலேஷியா தமிழ்) is a Malaysian television game show based on the American series of the same name. The series is hosted by THR Raaga's Dr. J. Ram on Astro Vinmeen HD.

== Format ==
The game show kicks off with the team leads of both teams competing at the podium to answer the first question. The fastest contestant who presses the buzzer will be given the opportunity to answer. If the answer provided is at the top of the list of ‘survey’ responses, that team will proceed to guess the subsequent answers.

If it is not, the opponent team will attempt to guess an answer higher up on the list. Responses listed are based on a survey conducted amongst 100 participants locally. The team with the highest marks will proceed to the fast money round for a chance to take home a cash prize of RM5,000.

== Legacy ==
Steve Harvey, the host of the American version of Family Feud, sent a congratulatory message to Malaysia for the announcement of the local version of the show.
