= Hundred to One (game show) =

Russian television game show

- Russian: Сто к одному
- Genre: Game show
- Based on: Family Feud by Mark Goodson
- Presented by: Alexander Gurevich (1995–2022); Alexander Akopov (since 2022)
- No. of seasons: 31 (2026)
- No. of episodes: 1700+ (2026)

Production
- Running time: 55 min.

Original release
- Network: NTV (1995–96); MTK (1997); TV Center (1997–98); RTR\Rossiya\Rossiya 1 (1998–present)
- Release: 8 January 1995 – present

Cadets of the Lieutenant General V.M. Khalilov Moscow Military Music College and the host Alexander Gurevich (center) during the filming of the program "Hundred to One."

Hundred to One (Russian: Сто к одному, romanized: Sto k odnomu) is a team-based game show on Russian television, analogous to the American game Family Feud. It premiered on January 8, 1995 on NTV, subsequently moved to MTK, then to the channel TV Center. From October 1998 to the present time the program goes on air weekly on Sundays at 12:20 Moscow time on TV channel Russia. The general timing (including Advertising blocks) is 55 minutes. Earlier editions, from 2000 to 2008 years were transmitted daily on the channel "Questions and answers". From 1995 to 2022, its host was Alexander Gurevich. After he left the channel in the light of Russia's invasion of Ukraine, he was replaced by Alexander Akopov in October 2022.

== Differences from the original version ==
- The game usually features two competing work collectives rather than two families.
- Amount of the top answers featured in each of the first three rounds is always six, compared to the original version with inconsistent amounts.
- The first round of the game is called "The Simple Game" (Russian: Простая игра, romanized: Prostaya igra), the second round is "The Double Game" (Russian: Двойная игра, romanized: Dvoinaya igra), and the third round is "The Triple Game" (Russian: Тройная игра, romanized: Troinaya igra).
- The fourth round is called "The Opposite Game" (Russian: Игра наоборот, romanized: Igra naoborot), which debuted on April 5, 1997. After the host reads out a question, the teams are given 20 seconds to confer. The objective is to find the sixth popular answer which is valued the most in this round. Once the timer runs out, both teams — starting with the one that has fewer points — each provide only one answer. The most popular answer is always worth 15 points, regardless of how many people gave that answer during a survey. The second answer is always worth 30 points, the third answer is 60 points, the fourth is 120 points, the fifth is 180 points, and the sixth answer is worth 240 points. The seventh and subsequent answers are worth nothing. The team that has more points after this round proceeds to the final round called "The Big Game".
- In "The Big Game" (Russian: Большая игра, romanized: Bol'shaya igra), which is similar to the original "Fast Money Round", the first player is given 15 seconds to answer all five questions, and the second player is given 20 seconds. Since December 16, 2023, the timers are set to 20 seconds for the first player and 30 seconds for the second, due to the new host’s slow pace in reading out. The timers start when the host begins reading the first question, rather than after he have finished reading it.

== Notable records ==
- On December 6, 2025 the team "Theatrical bloggers" (Russian: Театральные блогеры) set a new record of 739 points (499 points from the first three rounds and 240 points from "The Opposite Game").
- Arguably the most internationally well-known incident from the show was the episode shown on September 4, 2010 where a contestant in "The Big Game", Vardan Markos, failed to answer a single question, using his entire 20 second time limit trying to think of an answer to his first question — "What does a musician value the most?". The host Gurevich, while laughing, then asked him what he would have answered for this and the other four questions, and Markos claimed that he would have said "instrument", ironically the top answer, for the first question.
