= 100 latinos dijeron =

- Genre: Game show
- Based on: Family Feud by Mark Goodson
- Presented by: Marco Antonio Regil (2013-2016); Armando Hernández (2019); Mau Nieto (2019-present)
- Country of origin: United States
- Original language: Spanish
- No. of seasons: 2

Original release
- Network: MundoFox/MundoMax
- Release: September 9, 2013 – November 30, 2016
- Network: Estrella TV
- Release: February 19, 2019 – present

Related
- ¿Qué dice la gente?

100 latinos dijeron (100 Latinos Said) is the Spanish-language adaptation of the American program Family Feud, and is also a remake of the short-lived 2006–08 Spanish-language adaptation of Feud called ¿Qué dice la gente? (What Do People Say?) which aired on TeleFutura (now UniMás). The series, hosted by Marco Antonio Regil who also previously hosted ¿Que dice la gente? from 2006 until 2008 and 100 mexicanos dijeron from 2001 until 2006 respectively was transmitted by MundoMax (formerly MundoFox), premiered on September 9, 2013. This show was cancelled in 2016 due to its network, MundoMax, being dissolved. In 2018, it was announced that Estrella TV had signed a multi-year licensing agreement with Fremantle to revive the show. It was planned to debut in the early part of 2019. On February 12, 2019, it was announced that the revival will be hosted by Armando Hernández and would premiere on Estrella TV on February 19. On August 1, 100 Latinos dijeron was renewed for a second season and started adding comedian Mau Nieto as new host replacing Armando Hernandez. On October 2, 2022, an all-star celebrity version based on the 2015 American version of Celebrity Family Feud under the name ¿Qué Dicen los Famosos? (What Do Celebrities Say?) hosted by Rodrigo Vidal airs on Telemundo.

== Gameplay ==
In each episode, two families compete among themselves for a large sum of money, trying to guess responses from a survey of one hundred people. The fourth question is worth double points and each question thereafter is worth triple points. The sixth question, if necessary, features only the top answer on the board.

The first family to reach 300 points won $500 and two members of that family then play in a bonus round entitled "Dinero Rapido" (Fast Money), where they must answer five questions and score two hundred points to win $10,000. The first player must answer within 20 seconds and the second player must answer within 25 seconds. If the second player duplicates an answer, they are prompted for another answer.

Two new families compete in the first half-hour and the winners compete against the champions in the second half-hour, similar to the 1994 U.S. version (hosted by Richard Dawson at the time). Unlike the U.S. version, however, the family does not win anything if they do not reach 200 points.

On the 2019 revival, each winning family plays for $5,000. The family will only be paid for winning the Dinero Rapido round; otherwise, they win nothing.
