= 100 mexicanos dijeron =

Mexican game show

- Also known as: 100 mexicanos dijieron
- Genre: Game show
- Based on: Family Feud by Mark Goodson
- Presented by: Marco Antonio Regil; Adrián Uribe
- Country of origin: Mexico
- Original language: Spanish

Production
- Running time: 30 minutes

Original release
- Network: Las Estrellas
- Release: 2001 – 2006
- Release: 2009 – 2019

Related
- ¿Qué dice la gente?

100 mexicanos dijeron (Spanish for One hundred Mexicans said), later rebranded to 100 mexicanos dijieron, is a Mexican version of the Goodson-Todman game show from the 1970s, Family Feud, produced in Mexico City by the Las Estrellas.

From 2001 to 2006 the show was hosted by Marco Antonio Regil and was called 100 Mexicanos Dijeron. In 2009 the program was revived this time hosted by "El Vítor" (Adrián Uribe) and titled El Vítor presenta 100 Mexicanos Dijieron. The newest season premiered on April 30, 2017 and was titled as 100 Mexicanos Dijieron.

== Game Administration ==
For main game play, see Family Feud.

The game is administered like the US version of the game, with three single value questions, a double value question, and a triple value question. MX$5,000 is awarded for winning the game.

If neither family has three hundred points after four rounds, the fifth round is administered like the 1999-2003 US version (Anderson and first year of Karn) fourth round, in that contestants will have the opportunity to pass or play, and the family loses control of the board with only one strike.

During "El Vitor's" stint as host, episodes began to feature celebrities playing the main game on behalf of civilian families chosen from the audience. However, two members of the civilian family play "Dinero Rápido" (Fast Money).

As of 2017, families of four compete in four rounds. The third question scores double points with only one "triple" question to follow. The runner-up family would receive MX$10,000 (MX$25,000 until 2018).

== Dinero Rapido (Fast Money) ==
The winning family chooses two family members to play. One family member leaves the stage and is placed in an isolation booth, while the other is given fifteen seconds to answer five survey questions. If he or she can't think up an answer to any particular question, he or she may pass and come back to the question at the end, time permitting. The number of people giving each answer is then revealed answer by answer after the player is finished answering or time has expired. The player earns one point for each person that gave the same answer; at least two people must have given that answer for it to appear on the board.

Once all the points for the first player are tallied, the second family member comes back on stage and is given twenty seconds to answer the same five questions. The host will ask for another response should an answer be duplicated.

If one or both family members accumulate a total of 200 points or more, the family wins Dinero Rápido and MX$100,000. If the family members give the top answer for each question, they win a MX$25,000 bonus, regardless of the outcome. If only one family member named all five top answers, that bonus would double to MX$50,000.

On February 3, 2004, when the show was expanded to a full-hour format, an extra element was added to the second "Dinero Rápido", "La canasta de tentación" ("the basket of temptation"), a basket full of items, attached to each of which is a flag saying one of the following:

- Buena suerte ("good luck"): Simply means "good luck" and has no other effect.
- $5,000: The family playing gains MX$5,000.
- Dinero Extra: The family earns MX$25 per point for a DR loss. Not used long.
- Puntos extra ("extra points"): The family gains anywhere from five to fifty extra points. It is only truly effective if the family's score is at least 150 points.
- El Doble ("the double"): The family plays for MX$200,000. They will still win an extra MX$25,000 if they give the top answer in each question.

In 2017, the highest scoring family spun a wheel which contained amounts from MX$60,000 to MX$125,000 and winning Preguntas Rapidas (another name for Dinero Rápido) won the amount spun. A family who lost Preguntas Rapidas would win MX$50,000. As of 2018, a member of the winning family chooses one of 12 spaces, each hiding a cash amount from MX$25,000 to MX$50,000 and a loss would guarantee said family MX$20,000.

== American nexus ==
100 mexicanos dijeron [or 100 mexicanos dijieron] ("Family Feud"), along with Trato hecho ("Let's Make a Deal"), are two classic 1970s game shows revived for Latin American audiences. Because of the close cultural connections with the US, many questions have American as well as Latino answers.

== The board game ==
Due to the high popularity of this show, a board game of the same name has been created. It is sold in Mexico. The game contains 480 question cards, a 39x26 cm board, a pencil and a notepad.

Like in the show, two teams are formed and have to guess the answers given to the questions. The first team to reach 500 points wins. Unlike the TV show, the game does not include the final phase called Dinero Rápido ("Quick Cash", aka "Fast Money") where two players attempt to get up to 200 points answering five questions each. However, it hasn't been rare that families or parties playing attempt an imitation of the Dinero Rápido round.
