= Marco Antonio Regil =

Mexican game show host

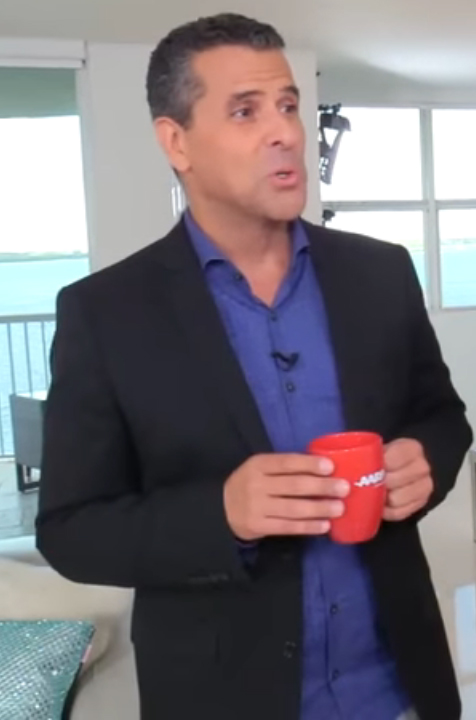
- Marco Antonio Regil
- Born: Marco Antonio Regil Sánchez; December 27, 1969 (age 56); Tijuana, Baja California, Mexico
- Occupations: TV Host, Actor, Producer, Public Speaker, Activist
- Website: http://www.marcoantonioregil.com

Marco Antonio Regil Sánchez (born December 27, 1969) is a Mexican television personality, public speaker and activist. As the host of the Spanish versions of Family Feud (100 mexicanos dijeron and 100 latinos dijeron), The Price Is Right (Atinale Al Precio), Are You Smarter than a 5th Grader? (Todo el mundo cree que sabe), and Generation Gap (Recuerda y Gana), Regil is a constant fixture in Latin households.

In 2018, Telemundo announced Marco Antonio Regil as the host of the Spanish-language version of NBC's The Wall. The game show is set to premiere in 2020.

== Career ==
Regil has been a prominent figure in Spanish-language entertainment in the United States.

He has hosted the Mexican versions of Are You Smarter Than a 5th Grader?, The Price Is Right, Family Feud, and Zodiac's Beyond Boundaries, as well as the Teletón (Mexican National Telethon) for which he has raised over half a billion dollars. He is also the voice of Metro Man (played by Brad Pitt in the U.S.) in the Mexican release of Megamind. A sought-after spokesman, he has also appeared in advertisements for such companies as McDonald's, H-E-B, Telmex and PepsiCo.

For his contributions in both Latin America and abroad, he was invited by United States President George W. Bush to host the Cinco de Mayo celebration in the White House in 2004.

== Activism ==
As a political contributor to the Huffington Post, Regil has written on major issues from the 2016 Presidential election to environmental law, and other breaking news.

In 2016, he joined forces with the Los Angeles Mayor's Office to launch their business portal website. He gave financial lectures throughout Los Angeles and was honored for his efforts by Mayor Eric Garcetti.

== Personal life ==
In 2023, he openly declared he is sapiosexual, saying that he is not interested in the physical, but that he is brought by intelligent conversations and people who work on themselves. Regil is vegan.

== Awards and honors ==
- 2016 – City of Los Angeles Certificate of Appreciation Presenter at LA Startup Business Tour Expo
- 2015 – PeTA Humanitarian of the Year
- Mexico's No. 1 TV Host – The Price Is Right, Are You Smarter than a 5th Grader?, Family Feud, Minute to Win It, and Mexican Telethon
