= List of broadcast stations owned by CBS Radio =

The following is a list of radio stations formerly owned by CBS Radio, a division of CBS Corporation, prior to its 2017 acquisition by Entercom (now Audacy, Inc.).

== Owned at time of merger with Entercom ==
=== Arizona ===
==== Phoenix ====
- KMLE (Country)
- KALV-FM (CHR)
- KOOL-FM (Classic Hits)

=== California ===
==== Los Angeles ====
- KAMP-FM 97.1 (CHR)
- KCBS-FM 93.1 (Adult Hits)
- KNX 1070 (News)
- KROQ-FM 106.7 (Alternative)
- KRTH 101.1 (Classic Hits)
- KTWV 94.7 (Urban AC)

==== Palm Springs ====
- KEZN (Adult Contemporary)

==== Temecula ====
- KXFG (Country)

==== Victor Valley ====
- KRAK (Sports)
- KVFG (Classic Hits)

==== Sacramento ====
- KHTK (sports)
- KNCI (Country)
- KSFM (CHR-Rhythmic)
- KYMX (Adult Contemporary)
- KZZO (Hot AC)

==== San Bernardino ====
- KFRG (Country)

==== San Diego ====
- KEGY (CHR)
- KYXY (AC)

==== San Francisco ====
- KCBS (News)
- KFRC-FM (News)
- KITS (Alternative)
- KLLC (Hot AC)
- KMVQ-FM (CHR)
- KZDG (South Asian Program)

=== Connecticut ===
==== Hartford ====
- WRCH (Adult Contemporary)
- WTIC (News/Talk)
- WTIC-FM (Hot AC)
- WZMX (CHR-Rhythmic)

=== District of Columbia ===
==== Washington ====
- WIAD (Hot AC)
- WJFK (Sports)
- WJFK-FM (Sports)
- WPGC-FM (Urban CHR)

=== Florida ===
==== Miami ====
- WKIS (Country)
- WPOW (CHR-Rhythmic)
- WQAM (Sports)

==== Orlando ====
- WOCL (Classic Hits)
- WOMX-FM (Hot AC)
- WQMP (CHR)

=== Georgia ===
==== Atlanta ====
- WAOK - 1380 - (Urban Talk)
- WVEE - 103.3 - (Urban Contemporary)
- WZGC - 92.9 - (Sports)

=== Illinois ===
==== Chicago ====
- WBBM - 780 - All News
- WBBM-FM - 96.3 - CHR/Top 40
- WCFS-FM - 105.9 - All News (simulcast of WBBM-AM)
- WJMK - 104.3 - Classic Hits
- WSCR - 670 - Sports talk radio
- WUSN - 99.5 - Country
- WXRT - 93.1 - AAA

=== Maryland ===
==== Annapolis ====
- WLZL - 107.9 - Tropical
- WDCH-FM - 99.1 - Business news

==== Baltimore ====
- WJZ (Sports)
- WJZ-FM (Sports)
- WLIF (Adult Contemporary)
- WWMX (Hot AC)

=== Massachusetts ===
==== Boston ====
- WBMX - 104.1 - (Hot AC)
- WBZ - 1030 - (News/Talk)
- WBZ-FM - 98.5 - (Sports)
- WODS - 103.3 - (CHR)
- WZLX - 100.7 - (Classic Rock)

=== Michigan ===
==== Detroit ====
- WDZH - 98.7 - Top 40
- WOMC - 104.3 - Classic Hits
- WYCD - 99.5 - Country
- WXYT-FM - 97.1 - Sports/Talk
- WXYT - 1270 - Sports/Talk
- WWJ - 950 - News

=== Minnesota ===
==== Minneapolis-Saint Paul ====
- KMNB - 102.9 - Country
- KZJK - 104.1 - Jack FM
- WCCO - 830 - News/Talk

=== Missouri ===
==== St. Louis ====
- KEZK-FM - 102.5 - Adult Contemporary
- KMOX - 1120 - News/Talk
- KYKY - 98.1 - HOT AC

=== Nevada ===
==== Las Vegas ====
- KLUC-FM - 98.5 - (CHR)
- KMXB- 94.1- (Hot Adult Contemporary)
- KXNT - 840 - (News/Talk)
- KXQQ-FM - 100.5 - (Rhythmic Hot AC)
- KXST - 1140 - (Sports)
- KXTE - 107.5 - (Alternative)

=== New York ===
==== New York City ====
- WHSQ - 880 - (Sports)
- WCBS-FM - 101.1 - (Classic Hits)
- WFAN - 660 - (Sports)
- WFAN-FM - 101.9 - (Sports; simulcast of WFAN-AM)
- WINS - 1010 - (News)
- WNEW-FM - 102.7 - (Hot AC)
- WBMP-FM - 92.3 - (CHR )

=== Ohio ===
==== Cleveland ====
- WDOK 102.1 (AC)
- WKRK-FM 92.3 (Sports)
- WNCX 98.5 (Classic Rock)
- WQAL 104.1 (Hot AC)

=== Pennsylvania ===
==== Philadelphia ====
- KYW - 1060 - (News)
- WIP-FM - 94.1 - (Sports)
- WOGL - 98.1 - (Classic Hits)
- WPHT - 1210 - (Talk)
- WTDY-FM - 96.5 - (Hot Adult Contemporary)
- WXTU - 92.5 - (Country)

==== Pittsburgh ====
- KDKA - 1020 - (News/Talk)
- KDKA-FM- 93.7 - (Sports)
- WBZZ - 100.7 - (Adult Top 40/CHR)
- WDSY-FM - 107.9 - (Country)

=== Texas ===
==== Dallas/Ft. Worth ====
- KJKK - 100.3 - (Adult Hits)
- KLUV - 98.7 - (Classic Hits/Commercials)
- KMVK - 107.5 - (Regional Mexican)
- KRLD - 1080 (News/Talk)
- KRLD-FM- 105.3 - (Sports)
- KVIL - 103.7 - (Alternative)

==== Houston ====
- KHMX - 96.5 - (Hot AC)
- KIKK - 650 - (Sports)
- KILT - 610 - (Sports)
- KILT-FM - 100.3 - (Country)
- KKHH - 95.7 - (Adult Hits)
- KLOL - 101.1 - (Spanish Contemporary)

=== Washington ===
==== Seattle ====
- KJAQ - 96.5 - (Adult Hits)
- KMPS-FM - 94.1 - (Country)
- KFNQ - 1090 - (Sports)
- KZOK-FM - 102.5 - (Classic Rock)

== Formerly owned stations ==
=== California ===
==== Fresno ====
- KFJK
- KFPT
- KMGV
- KMJ
- KLBN
- KSKS
- KWYE

(Note: Sold entire cluster to Peak Broadcasting)

==== Sacramento ====
- KQJK

(Note: Sold to Clear Channel, now iHeartMedia)

=== Colorado ===
==== Denver ====
- KIMN
- KWOF
- KXKL-FM

(Note: Sold entire cluster to Wilks Broadcasting)

=== Florida ===
==== Tampa ====
- WHFS
- WHFS-FM
- WLLD
- WQYK-FM
- WRBQ-FM
- WYUU

(Note: Sold entire cluster to Beasley Broadcast Group)

==== West Palm Beach ====
- WAXY-FM
- WEAT
- WMBX
- WIRK
- WUUB

(Note: WAXY-FM sold to Lincoln Financial Media and moved to the Miami market; WUUB sold to Good Karma Broadcasting; remaining stations sold to Palm Beach Broadcasting)

=== Maryland ===
==== Baltimore ====
- WQSR

(Note: Sold to Clear Channel)

=== Missouri ===
==== Kansas City ====
- KBEQ
- KCKC
- KFKF
- KMXV

(Note: Sold entire cluster to Wilks Broadcasting)

=== New York ===
==== Buffalo ====
- WBLK
- WBUF
- WECK
- WJYE
- WYRK

(Note: Sold entire cluster to Regent Communications)

==== Rochester ====
- WCMF
- WPXY
- WRMM
- WZNE

(Note: Sold entire cluster to Entercom, who in turn divested three stations to Stephens Media Group as required by the FCC)

=== North Carolina ===
==== Charlotte ====
- WBAV
- WBCN
- WFNZ
- WKQC-FM
- WNKS
- WPEG
- WSOC-FM

(Note: Sold entire cluster to Beasley Broadcast Group)

==== Graham ====
- WSML

==== Greensboro ====
- WMFR

==== Winston-Salem ====
- WSJS

(Note: Sold entire cluster to Curtis Media Group.)

=== Ohio ===
==== Cincinnati ====
- WAQZ
- WGRR
- WKRQ
- WUBE-FM

(Note: Sold entire cluster to Entercom Communications, now Audacy, who in turn sold three of those stations to Bonneville International and then Hubbard Broadcasting. WGRR was later swapped to Cumulus Media.)

=== Oregon ===
==== Portland ====
- KINK
- KLTH
- KUFO
- KUPL
- KXFD
- KXJM

(Note: KINK, KUFO, KUPL and KXFD sold to Alpha Broadcasting; KLTH and KXJM sold to Clear Channel)

=== Pennsylvania ===
==== Philadelphia ====
- WIP

(Note: Sold to Beasley Broadcast Group.)

=== Tennessee ===
==== Memphis ====
- WMC (AM)
- WMC-FM
- WMFS-FM

(Note: Sold entire cluster to Entercom)

=== Texas ===
==== Austin ====
- KAMX
- KJCE
- KKMJ-FM
- KXBT

(Note: Sold entire cluster to Entercom)

==== San Antonio ====
- KJXK
- KTSA
- KTFM

(Note: Sold to BMP Radio)

=== Washington ===
==== Tacoma ====
- KBKS-FM

(Note: Sold to Clear Channel)
