= Los Angeles Lakers radio networks =

Radio network for the Lakers basketball team

The Los Angeles Lakers radio networks consist of two separate networks for the coverage of the National Basketball Association (NBA)'s Los Angeles Lakers basketball team. One is an English language network while the other is a Spanish language network. There are 17 total stations in four states (Arizona, California, Nevada, and New Mexico) between the two networks.

== On-air personnel ==
Current announcers for the English-language network include John Ireland as the play-by-play announcer since 2011. The color commentator since 2004 is former Lakers player (with the team for their 1987 & 1988 championships) Mychal Thompson. Thompson, who originally worked with Spero Dedes stayed on as an announcer when the broadcasts moved from KLAC to KSPN at the start of the 2009–2010 season.

Former on-air personnel for the network have included legendary play-by-play announcer Chick Hearn and former NBA player Stu Lantz as a color commentator. Pat Riley served as a color commentator for the network from 1977 until late 1979 when he became an assistant coach for the team.

== English-language network ==
Map of radio affiliates

The English-language Los Angeles Lakers Radio Network is a three-state, 11-station network with KSPN ("710 ESPN") serving as the flagship. Starting with the 2009–2010 season, KSPN took over the flagship position under a five-year deal, thus ending the Lakers' three-decade relationship with KLAC. KLAC served as the Lakers' flagship station from 1977 to 2009.

=== Network affiliates ===
==== California ====
Callsign	Frequency	Location
KSPN (Flagship)	710 AM	Los Angeles
KMET & K251CC	1490 AM & 98.1 FM	Banning/Beaumont
KSZL & K228FU	1230 AM & 93.5 FM	Barstow
KFIG	1430 AM	Fresno
KFPT	790 AM	Clovis/Fresno
KKUU & K280CV	92.7 HD2 & 103.9 FM	Palm Springs
KGB & KGB-FM HD2	760 & 101.5 HD2	San Diego
KXTK & K269GY	1280 AM & 101.7 FM	San Luis Obispo

==== Hawaii ====
Callsign	Frequency	Location
KIKI	990 AM	Honolulu

==== New Mexico ====
Callsign	Frequency	Location
KYVA	1230 AM	Gallup

== Spanish-language network ==
The Spanish-language network is a two-state, four-station network with KFWB serving as its flagship.

=== Network affiliates ===
==== California ====
Callsign	Frequency	Location
KWAC	1490 AM	Bakersfield
KFWB	980 AM	Los Angeles (network flagship)
KHIT-FM	107.1 FM	Fresno, California
KFBG	100.7 FM	San Diego, California/Tijuana, Baja California

==== Nevada ====
Callsign	Frequency	Location
KENO	1460 AM	Las Vegas

== Former affiliates for either network ==
=== Arizona ===
Callsign	Frequency	Location
KTKT	990 AM	Tucson (until 2009)

=== California ===
Callsign	Frequency	Location
KLAC	570 AM	Los Angeles (network flagship from 1977 to 2009)
KERN	1410 AM	Bakersfield (2002)
KGAM	1450 AM	Palm Springs (2002)
KIXW	960 AM	Apple Valley (2002)
KKZQ	100.1 FM	Tehachapi (2002)
KMSL	1510 AM	Ontario (1998)
KSMA	1240 AM	Santa Maria (2002)
KXO	1230 AM	El Centro (until 2009)
KBKY	94.1 FM	Merced (until 2009)
KGST	1600 AM	Fresno (until 2009)

=== Nevada ===
Callsign	Frequency	Location
KENO	1460 AM	Las Vegas (2002)
KPTT	630 AM	Reno (2002)
