= Fútbol de Primera (radio network) =

American Spanish-language soccer radio network

- Genre: Soccer
- Country of origin: United States
- Language: Spanish
- Starring: Andrés Cantor, Sammy Sadovnik, Jaime Gallardo, Rosa Beatriz Sánchez, Daniel Chapela
- Original release: August 1989
- Website: Official Site

Fútbol de Primera is an American radio network covering soccer. It is the home of the most exclusive soccer radio rights in the country. It has broadcast the World Cup since 2002, including the most recent 2022 FIFA World Cup, along with other FIFA tournaments. FDP also broadcasts Mexico's national team games, the CONCACAF Gold Cup, and had broadcast the Copa América in 2015 and 2016.

Fútbol de Primera produces a daily show hosted by Andrés Cantor, which has been running since 1989. Alongside Cantor, the show's personalities are Sammy Sadovnik, Jaime Gallardo, and Rosa Beatriz Sánchez. The show covers a wide range of football highlighting daily events in Mexico, Latin America, and Europe providing in-depth analysis of the most important headlines of the day. They are the longest-running, nationally syndicated Spanish radio program in the country and can be heard on 115 affiliated stations in the U.S. and others throughout Central and South America. Additionally, the daily program, as well as game broadcasts can be heard globally on the network's official YouTube and Twitch channels.

Fútbol de Primera is based in Miami, but has offices in New York City, San Francisco, and San Antonio. Cantor is also the co-chairman of the network along with Alejandro Gutman.

== History ==
Former logo of Fútbol de Primera

Fútbol de Primera Radio Network was created in August 1989 by Alejandro Gutman taking its first steps in becoming an integral part of the nation's soccer landscape. With vast experience in the soccer world, Fútbol de Primera realized there was a need for soccer to be listened to on a substantial market list of stations that match the quality of the games themselves. In a historic move, Fútbol de Primera Radio worked with its affiliates to broaden the landscape beyond AM and talk radio to put soccer on the FM dial music formatted stations as soccer specials. The strategy worked and powerhouse matches over the years have been heard nationally without fail. Fútbol de Primera's most renowned broadcasts include the 2002, 2006, 2010 and 2014 FIFA World Cup. Other broadcasts include the Mexico national team games, CONCACAF World Cup Qualification and a record eight consecutive CONCACAF Gold Cups.

In 1991, Fútbol de Primera created the Fútbol de Primera Player of the Year which for twenty years was sponsored by the American Honda Motor Company. This award recognizes the best United States men's national soccer team player as voted by the U.S. media.

FDP also produces "Casos y Cosas de Collins" a one-hour weekly show hosted by renowned Mexican journalist and author María Antonieta Collins.

== Game Broadcasts ==
- Copa Mundial de FIFA (2002-present)
- Copa FIFA Confederaciones (2003-2017)
- CONCACAF FIFA World Cup Qualifiers
- Copa Mundial de Futsal de FIFA
- Mundial de Clubes de FIFA
- CONCACAF Copa Oro
- Copa América
- Mexico national football team
- Copa Africana de Naciones
- Copa de la Liga de Inglaterra (EFL Cup)
- Copa de Alemania (DFB-Pokal/German Cup)
- Juego de la Semana (Spanish: Game of the Week):
  - Serie A
  - Ligue 1
  - Bundesliga

== Broadcast Team ==
Fútbol de Primera has a core broadcast team that is part of the daily show.

- Sammy Sadovnik
- Rosa Beatriz Sánchez
- Jaime Gallardo
- Daniel Chapela
- Carlos Aranzamendi (Correspondent in El Salvador)
- Enrique "Kike" Lanza (Correspondent in Honduras)
- Aldo Lara (Correspondent in Guadalajara)
- René Fernández (Correspondent in Monterrey)
- Mauricio Acosta (Correspondent in Mexico City)
- David Ruiz (Correspondent in Spain)

For World Cups, Fútbol de Primera recruits former soccer players, coaches, and savants to their show. The following have been a part of Fútbol de Primera's broadcast team at World Cups.

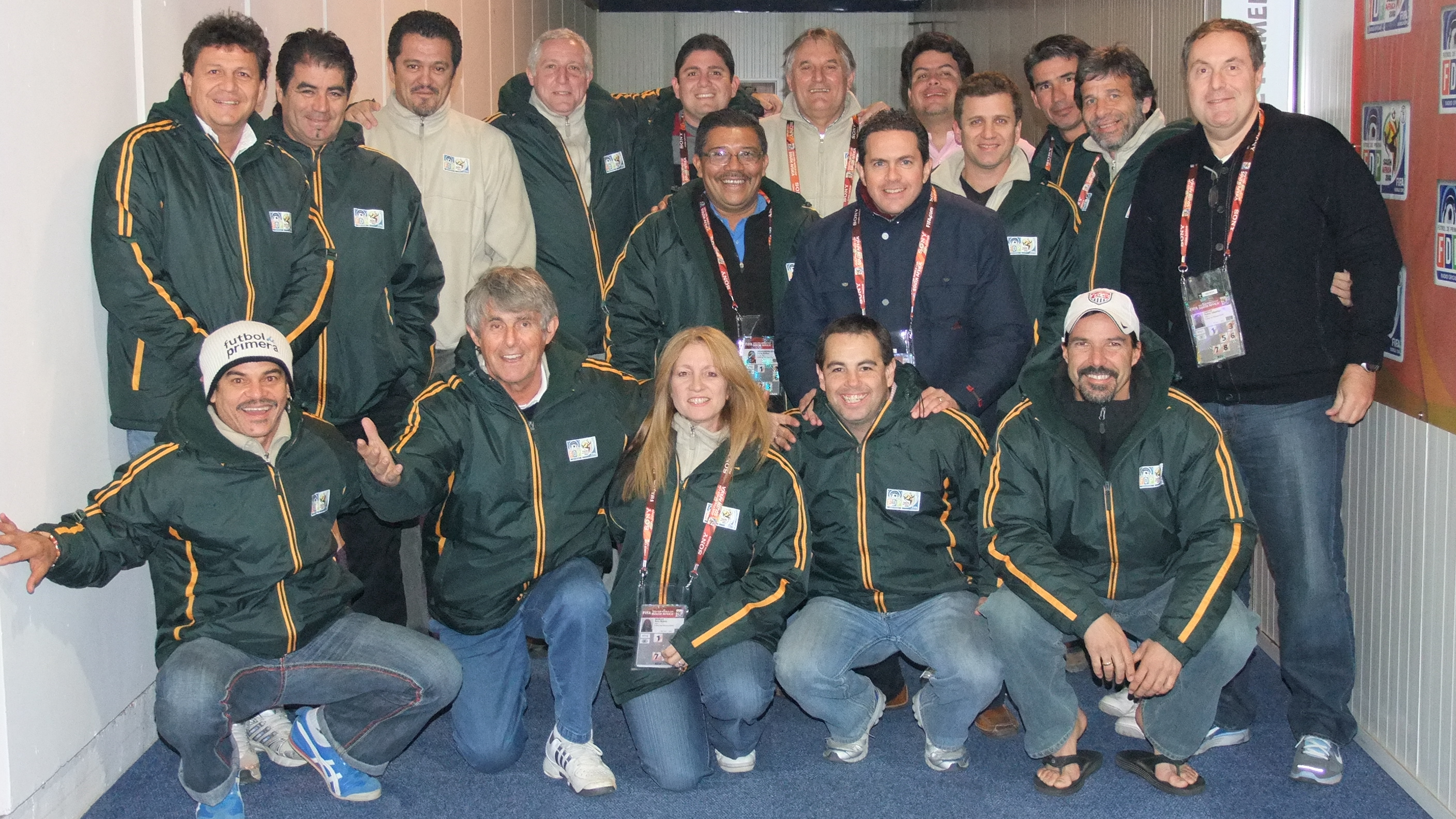
Cantor (far right), Valderrama (first row left), with other members of Fútbol de Primera's broadcast team at the 2010 FIFA World Cup in South Africa

- Carlos Valderrama
- Bora Milutinović
- Carlos Hermosillo
- Manuel Sol
- Eduardo de la Torre
- Carlos de los Cobos
- Steve Sampson
- Javier Castrilli
- Aníbal "Maño" Ruiz
- Edgardo Broner
- Eugenio Díaz
- Kevin Rodríguez
- Ernesto Barrera
- Mariano Closs

== Stations ==
The following is a list of full-power radio stations, HD Radio subchannels, and low-power translators broadcasting Fútbol de Primera programming such as the daily show and matches can be heard

Albuquerque-Santa Fe, New Mexico

- 105.9 FM Jose

Atlanta, Georgia

- 1600 AM La Mejor
- 1460 AM La Mejor
- 1130 AM La Mejor

Atlantic City, New Jersey

- 97.3 FM WENJ (World Cup and Gold Cup broadcasts only)

Amarillo, Texas

- 96.1 FM KBEX La Poderosa
- 87.7 FM KBEX-LP La Poderosa
- 105.1 FM KAMT-FM

Austin, Texas

- 97.1 KTXX-FM HD2 Fiesta FM

Bakersfield, California

- 94.9 FM KXTT La Mejor

Barstow, California

- 97.5 FM KLYY Jose
- 95.9 FM KXXZ El Portal

Baton Rouge, Louisiana

- 105.5 FM Tropical

Bend, Oregon

- 1240 AM La Bronca

Boise, Idaho

- 101.9 FM La Gran D

Chicago, Illinois

- 1590 AM WCGO 1590 AM
- 107.9 FM La Ley

Colorado Springs-Pueblo, Colorado

- 92.1 FM Jose

Dallas-Ft. Worth, Texas

- 87.7 FM La Mexicana

Denver-Boulder, Colorado

- 92.1 FM Jose
- 1150 AM Onda 1150

El Centro-Yuma, California

- 94.5 FM Jose

El Paso, Texas

- 94.7 FM KYSE El Gato
- 1650 AM KSVE Jose

Eugene, Oregon

- 880 AM La Campeona

Fayetteville, Arkansas

- 95.7 FM La Zeta

Fresno-Visalia, California

- 1600 AM KGST 1600 AM
- 101.9 FM KLBN
- 107.1 FM KHIT-FM

Greensboro, North Carolina

- 1590 AM Que Pasa Radio
- 1380 AM Que Pasa Radio
- 1040 AM Que Pasa Radio

Greenville, South Carolina

- 1260 AM WPJF 1260 AM
- 1580 AM La Poderosa

Hartford-New Haven, Connecticut

- 840 AM La Gigante

Houston-Galveston, Texas

- 850 AM KEYH La Ranchera
- 96.9 FM La Bonita

Indianapolis, Indiana

- 810 AM La Joya 810 AM
- 107.1 FM Radio Latina

Knoxville, Tennessee

- 93.5 FM La Lider 93.5

Lakeland, Florida

- 1460 AM La X

Las Vegas, Nevada

- 92.7 FM Maria

Lillington, North Carolina

- 1370 AM WLLN 1370 AM

Little Rock, Arkansas

- 106.3 FM La Zeta

Los Angeles, California

- 97.5 FM KLYY Jose
- 103.1 FM KDLD El Gato

Lubbock, Texas

- 1460 AM KBZO Jose

McAllen-Brownsville, Texas

- 101.1 FM KNVO-FM Jose

Memphis, Tennessee

- 1030 AM Radio Ambiente Caliente

Miami-Ft. Lauderdale, Florida

- 1020 AM Actualidad 1020

Minneapolis, Minnesota

- 1530 AM La Picosa

Monett, Missouri

- 97.7 FM La M Grande

Nashville, Tennessee

- 1240 AM Activa

New Orleans, Louisiana

- 1540 AM-105.7 FM Tropical

New York, New York/Paterson, New Jersey

- WKDM 1380 (New York City)
- WPAT 930 (Paterson, New Jersey)
- WPAT-FM 93.1 Amor 93 (Paterson, New Jersey)

Oklahoma City, Oklahoma

- 1460 AM La Tremenda

Orlando-Daytona Beach, Florida

- 1340 AM Onda Mexicana

Oxnard, California

- 910 AM KOXR La Mexicana

Palm Springs, California

- 97.5 FM KLYY Jose
- 94.7 FM KLOB Jose

Philadelphia, Pennsylvania

- 1590 AM

Phoenix, Arizona

- 710 AM KBMB
- 107.1 FM KVVA-FM Jose
- 106.7 FM KDVA Jose
- 1190 AM KNUV Onda 1190

Ponce, Puerto Rico

- WPAB 550 AM

Portland, Oregon

- 880 AM La Campeona

Raleigh-Durham, North Carolina

- 1310 AM La Mega

Rankin, Texas

- 93.7 FM KXFS

Reidsville, North Carolina

- 1220 AM Que Pasa Radio

Reno, Nevada

- 102.1 FM Tricolor

Richmond, Virginia

- 1480 AM La X
- 1320 AM Selecta 1320

Sacto-Stockton-Modesto, California

- 104.3 FM KXSE Jose
- 97.1 FM KTSE-FM Jose
- 1690 AM KFSG

Saint George, Utah

- 101.1 FM Stereo Unica

Salinas, Monterey, Santa Cruz, California

- 107.1 FM Jose

Salt Lake City-Ogden-Provo, Utah

- 1600 AM KTUB Juan

San Diego, California

- 1040 AM

San Francisco-San Jose, California

- 93.3 FM KRZZ La Raza
- 1370 AM KZSF La Kaliente

Sta Barbara, California

- 1250 AM KZER Radio Lazer

Santa Maria, California

- 1480 AM KSBQ La Mexicana

Santa Rosa, California

- 104.1 FM KJOR La Mejor

Seattle-Tacoma, Washington

- 1210 AM Latino

Tampa-St Petersburg, Florida

- 1550 AM La Ley

Tucson, Arizona

- 990 AM KTKT 990 AM

Twin Falls, Idaho

- 970 AM La Fantastica

Vineland, New Jersey

- 1440 AM Radio Exitos

Washington, DC

- 87.7 FM La Nueva
- 900 AM "America 900" (during World Cup 2018)

West Palm Beach, Florida

- 1040 AM Actualidad

Yakima, Washington

- 96.9 FM-97.9 FM-95.9 FM La Gran D
