= KXUA =

Radio station at the University of Arkansas Fayetteville

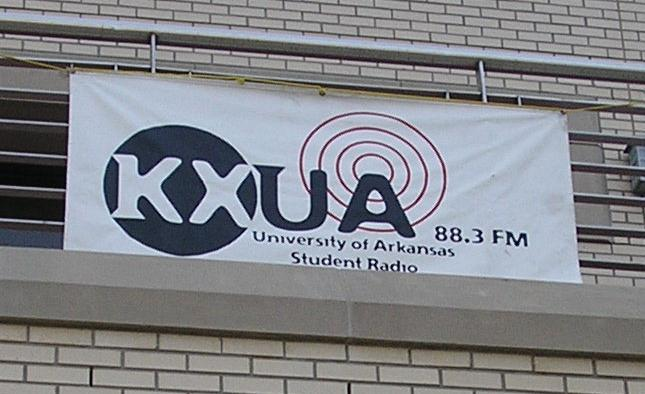
- Fayetteville, Arkansas; United States
- Broadcast area: University of Arkansas campus and surrounding community
- Frequency: 88.3 MHz

Programming
- Format: Eclectic

Ownership
- Owner: Board of Trustees of the University of Arkansas
- Sister stations: KUAF

History
- First air date: April 1, 2001
- Former call signs: KRZR
- Call sign meaning: KX University of Arkansas

Technical information
- Licensing authority: FCC
- Facility ID: 86662
- Class: A
- ERP: 470 watts
- HAAT: 80 meters (260 ft)
- Transmitter coordinates: 36°3′56″N 94°10′30″W

Links
- Public license information: Public file; LMS
- Webcast: Listen Live
- Website: Official website

KXUA (88.3 FM) is a student-run college radio station broadcasting an eclectic radio format. Licensed to Fayetteville, Arkansas, it serves the university campus and surrounding community. The university also owns the more powerful 91.3 KUAF, which broadcasts news, information and classical music as an NPR member station.

== History ==
From 1973 to 1986, the University of Arkansas had a student radio station known as KUAF, broadcasting at 91.3FM. However, in 1986, KUAF became a network affiliate of National Public Radio, gaining a wide following but at a loss of student input. Three years later, a group of students decided to form a new student radio station, named KRFA, which would be based on the college radio format. Their callsign was a reference to Radio Free Europe, the acronym meaning Radio Free Arkansas. The "broadcasting" was done via cable and carrier current, rather than FM or AM, which was available to on-campus facilities only. In the spring of 1994 KRFA disbanded.

In the fall of 1994, KRZR was formed as student organization at the University of Arkansas with the goal of creating an FM station to serve the university and surrounding communities. A consulting engineer was hired to do a frequency check and complete the technical portion for a 500 watt station at 90.1FM.

In the Spring of 1996, a communications lawyer was hired to complete the non-technical portion of the government application for 90.1 FM and it was filed with the Federal Communications Commission (FCC). The American Family Association (AFA), a Christian radio organization, also filed for 90.1 FM. Subsequently, KRZR filed for 88.3FM; so did the AFA. After several months, the AFA and the University of Arkansas came to a settlement and the student radio station was given 88.3 FM, while 90.1 FM became a religious outlet. At some point during this process, the callsign KRZR was claimed by a station simulcasting KALZ, a talk radio station. On April 28, 1999, the station ran a search for unused callsigns beginning with the letter K, and of those open callsigns, they chose KXUA.

In the spring of 1999, the University of Arkansas Media Board accepted the student radio station as a campus organization, among the ranks of the Arkansas Traveler (the student newspaper), the Razorback Yearbook, the AuxArc Review (a literary magazine), and UATV. KXUA signed on with its first broadcast on April 1, 2000. In the spirit of April Fools' Day, the first listeners were led to believe that the station wasn't allowed to play music, a stunt upheld by the DJs playing nothing but political speeches. Soon enough the prank was dismissed, and listeners got their first taste of real programming.

The original transmitter was located on top of Humphreys Hall in the elevator shaft. It was a repurposed intercom system with a very large antenna. The studio was connected to the transmitter via an open phone line, and periodically had to be reset by "calling the transmitter" and typing in a code. The transmitter was installed directly under a faucet that would very occasionally drip. This eventually took the station off air for a few months in 2008.

For the ten year anniversary, the station promoted a switch in formatting to education programming, and broadcast lectures, quantum physics texts, and audio versions of esoteric Wikipedia articles. Listeners called in and complained all day long filling up the answer machine, and then calling other offices on campus. The joke was revealed at the end of the day during a special retrospective show in the evening, during which many former DJs called in and talked about their experiences with the station.

While the station was originally located at the Student Union Building, in 2020, it moved to Kimpel Hall, in the newly renovated Candace Dixon-Horne Radio Broadcast Center, which includes an office for the DJs and staff, a live studio, and a production studio.

For the twenty-first anniversary, in 2021, the station began a new tradition of producing a zine every year, for the anniversary of the founding of the station. These can be viewed on the station's website. They also produce and distribute physical copies of a zine at the time of its publishing.

== Format ==
KXUA's format is non commercial. The station usually does not play any music that has appeared on the top 40 of the Billboard Hot 100 chart in the last 40 years. Eclectic music, mainly the newest arrivals, plays in the rotation schedule, which is what plays when no DJ-hosted shows are on air. DJs host freeform shows throughout the week, excluding most dates that the university is closed. These shows include music shows, where DJs create a track list and discuss it, as well as podcasts. The rules for what makes a show a music or podcast-form show are generally loose enough to allow the creation of shows that border on both, such as shows that discuss a smaller volume of music much more in-depth than a traditional music show. KXUA also sponsors local events, and schedules in-studio performances from local and traveling musicians. Most genre shows are recorded and made available through the KXUA website and individual DJs websites and on iTunes for free.

All DJs are directly affiliated with the university, either as students or employees, and are volunteers. The executive staff controls the station and is made up entirely of students that and are elected each year. They are the only paid members of the station. The executive staff includes a Station Manager, two music directors, a Social Media Director, a Programming Director, and a Podcasting Director.

KXUA is unique for the Northwest Arkansas region, though somewhat similar to many college stations across the nation. KXUA prides itself in not only providing an opportunity for students to learn broadcasting experience, but as a major source for music education on the campus and community.

== See also ==
- Campus radio
- List of college radio stations in the United States
