= KMJ =

KMJ may refer to:

- KMJ (AM), a radio station (580 AM) licensed to serve Fresno, California, United States
- KMJ-FM, a radio station (105.9 FM) licensed to serve Fresno, California
- KSEE, formerly KMJ-TV (1953–1981), Fresno, California
- Kumamoto Airport IATA code
