= KFRE =

KFRE may refer to:

- KFRE-TV, a television station (channel 59 analog/36 digital) licensed to serve Sanger, California, United States
- KFSN-TV, a television station (channel 30) in Fresno, California, which held the call sign KFRE-TV from 1956 to 1971.
- KYNO 940 AM, a radio station licensed to Fresno, California, United States, which held the call sign KFRE from 1937 to 2000.
- KSKS 93.7 FM, a radio station licensed to Fresno, California, United States, which held the call sign KFRE-FM from 1963 to 1971
