= Y101 =

Y101 may refer to one of the following radio stations:

- KRRY, of Quincy, Illinois
- KWYE, of Fresno, California
- WHYA, of Cape Cod, Massachusetts
- WYOY, of Jackson, Mississippi
- CKBY-FM, of Smiths Falls and Ottawa, Ontario, identified as Y101 from 2004 to 2013
- DYIO, of Cebu City, Philippines

Y101 may also refer to:

- Yttrium-101 (Y-101 or ^{101}Y), an isotope of yttrium
