= KWYE =

Radio station in Fresno, California

Coordinates: 36.930°N 119.642°W

- Fresno, California; United States
- Broadcast area: Fresno metropolitan area
- Frequency: 101.1 MHz
- Branding: Y101 FM

Programming
- Format: Hot adult contemporary

Ownership
- Owner: Cumulus Media; (Cumulus Licensing LLC)
- Sister stations: KMGV, KMJ, KMJ-FM, KSKS

History
- First air date: January 21, 1961
- Former call signs: KCIB-FM (1962–1968); KFIG (1968–1984); KFIG-FM (1984–1992); KSXY (1992–1994); KRBT (1994–1996); KVSR (1996–2003)
- Former frequencies: 94.5 MHz (1962–1973)
- Call sign meaning: WYE is sounded out as "Y"

Technical information
- Licensing authority: FCC
- Facility ID: 18406
- Class: B
- ERP: 10,000 watts
- HAAT: 328 meters (1,076 ft)

Links
- Public license information: Public file; LMS
- Webcast: Listen live
- Website: y101hits.com

KWYE (101.1 FM, "Y101") is a commercial radio station licensed to Fresno, California, United States, airing a hot adult contemporary format. Owned by Cumulus Media, its studios are at the Radio City building on Shaw Avenue in North Fresno.

KWYE's transmitter and tower are located off Auberry Road, northeast of Clovis.

== History ==
The station signed on the air on January 21, 1961. Its call sign was KCIB-FM and it broadcast on 94.5 MHz. It was owned by American Family Broadcasters, airing a Christian radio format. The tower was co-located in Clovis at a site shared with KXQR-FM and KAIL TV 53.

The Universal Broadcasting Company acquired it in 1968, switching to a middle of the road music (MOR) format. It changed the call letters to KFIG. (Figs are a popular crop in the Fresno area.)

In late 1969, KFIG changed to a progressive rock format patterned after pioneering rock station KMPX in San Francisco. KFIG moved to 101.1 in 1973, coupled with increased antenna height and a better signal. The rock format lasted until the late 1970s, when the format was changed to adult contemporary, "Mellow Music".

In 1984, the station adopted the "Yes/No Radio" format, where several times a day KFIG would play a song and invite listeners to call in and vote on whether or not KFIG should continue playing that song. After the "Yes/No Radio" format was retired, the station went back to being a regular adult contemporary station.

In September 1992, the call letters were changed to KSXY. Despite the obvious connotation of "Sexy" implied by that call sign, station management initially insisted that they were NOT meaning to imply "Sexy." For about six months, the airstaff would read the call letters as K–S (pause) X-Y. After that time, the station nickname was changed to "Sexy 101.1".

"Sexy" lasted until Headliner Broadcasting sold the station to EBE Broadcasting, who owned KNAX and KFRE. In June 1994, the new owners changed the format of KSXY to country music. They heralded the format change by playing nothing but Garth Brooks songs under the "101.1 K-Garth" name. After this stunt, the station relaunched as "Froggy Country 101.1" KRBT. The Froggy Country format was delivered by satellite, not using local DJs. It did not make much of a ratings impact in the Fresno radio ratings.

In 1996, the station was sold to Infinity Broadcasting, the owner of leading country station 93.7 KSKS. Management did not want to own two country stations competing with each other. Since KSKS had better ratings, KRBT was changed in September 1996 to modern adult contemporary with the nickname of "Star 101". The call sign was changed to KVSR at that time. Star 101 was successful until rival station KTHT changed to "Alice", which was a similar format.

Both stations competed with Hot AC sounds until Star 101 threw in the towel in 2002, becoming KWYE, with the moniker "Y-101." With these changes, the station fired most of the air staff and began a new on-air campaign. It began airing a Top 40 (CHR) format using the slogan "Y101, #1 for All the Hits". It hired a new staff of DJs and kicked off a new morning show called the "Y101 Morning Zoo."

On December 13, 2006, new owners Peak Broadcasting pulled the plug on KWYE's Top 40 format and flipped the station to adult contemporary music. It called itself the place for "Today's Hits, Yesterday Favorites." The reason for this might have to do with Fresno/Hanford/Visalia radio market already being saturated with two popular Rhythmic Top 40 stations 94.9 KBOS-FM and 97.1 KSEQ. Although KWYE maintained good ratings in the market, it wasn't enough to overtake the two Rhythmic Top 40 stations, especially in a market with a large Hispanic population. Y-101 returned to a Hot AC sound to aim at listeners in their 30s and 40s.

Around 2000, KWYE updated its format, dropping 1970s songs from the playlist. It began using the slogan "80's, 90's, Now." In mid-April 2009, KWYE moved back to a Modern AC format. It later refocused on mainstream Hot AC hits, mostly from 2000 to today.

On August 30, 2013, a deal was announced in which Townsquare Media would purchase Peak Broadcasting. It would then immediately swap Peak's Fresno stations, including KWYE, to Cumulus Media in exchange for Cumulus Media stations in Dubuque, Iowa and Poughkeepsie, New York. The deal is part of Cumulus' acquisition of Dial Global. Peak, Townsquare, and Dial Global were all controlled by Oaktree Capital Management.

The sale to Cumulus was completed on November 14, 2013. Cumulus also owns 580 KMJ, 105.9 KMJ-FM, 97.9 KMGV and 93.7 KSKS in the Fresno radio market.
