= Jonathan Schleuss =

American journalist

Jonathan Schleuss is an American journalist and the international president of the NewsGuild-CWA, a labor union representing more than 20,000 journalists and media workers in the United States and Canada. Schleuss previously worked as a graphics and data journalist at the Los Angeles Times, where in 2018 he helped lead his co-workers to organize a union with the Guild.

== Career and education ==
Schleuss started at the Los Angeles Times in 2013 as a graphics and data journalist. Prior to joining the L.A. Times, he worked as the online editor at the Northwest Arkansas Democrat-Gazette and as a weekend host for KUAF, a National Public Radio affiliate based in Fayetteville, Arkansas.

Schleuss has also served as an adjunct professor at the USC Annenberg School for Communication and Journalism. He graduated in 2013 from the University of Arkansas with a bachelor's degree in journalism.

== Election for president of The NewsGuild ==
On December 10, 2019, Schleuss won a rerun election for president of the Guild by a vote of 1,979 to 1,514. He ran against three-term incumbent Bernie Lunzer as a reform candidate with a platform focused on modernization, organizing and transparency. The original election, which Schleuss lost by 271 votes, was set aside by union officials in August 2018 after more than 1,000 members failed to receive ballots.
