= KGST =

Coordinates: 36°42′35.8″N 119°50′9.5″W

- Fresno, California; United States
- Frequency: 1600 kHz
- Branding: Multi Cultural 1600 AM

Programming
- Format: Brokered programming

Ownership
- Owner: Lotus Communications; (Lotus Fresno Corp.)
- Sister stations: KHIT-FM; KLBN; KKBZ; KSEQ

History
- First air date: 1949
- Last air date: 2026

Technical information
- Licensing authority: FCC
- Facility ID: 38453
- Class: B
- Power: 5,000 watts

Links
- Public license information: Public file; LMS
- Website: www.spiceradiousa.com

KGST (1600 AM) was a commercial radio station in Fresno, California, broadcasting a brokered programming radio format, with shows in English, Spanish, Portuguese and Armenian. It was owned by Lotus Communications with studios on East Olive Avenue in Fresno.

KGST was powered at 5,000 watts non-directional by day. At night, to avoid interfering with other stations on 1600 AM, it used directional antenna a four-tower array. The station's transmitter was off West Church Avenue in the Edison neighborhood of Fresno.

== History ==
KGST signed on the air in 1949. It started out as a mixed-format "international" station with programs available in Armenian, Italian, Japanese, Portuguese, Spanish, and Serbian. Its programs were hosted by brokers who paid for airtime.

It later became one of the earliest radio stations in California and the first in the San Joaquin Valley with full-time Spanish-language programming. At its inception, KGST was the only independent (not affiliated with the four major networks) station in Fresno's five-station market (cf. White's Radio Log, Fall 1949).

For most of the years it played regional Mexican music, it was known as "La Mexicana". Juan Mercado, who got his start as the Spanish-language programming director at a Visalia station, was one of the most popular deejays at the station. In 1959, he was able to buy the station due to his success. Mercado died just two years later and the station was bought by a couple of men who were at the time also running KLOK in San Jose.

In the mid-1950s to 1960s, KGST was an "eclectic" mix of country and western, blues, jazz, and Spanish and other language programming. "Happy Harold's House of Blues" was a program fixture for many years (cf. Fresno Bee radio logs). In that time, KGST was a daytimer, running 1,000 watts and required to sign off at sunset.(cf. White's Radio Log, various editions). KGST later got a boost in power to 5,000 watts and full time authorization.

In 1988, KGST was bought by Lotus Corporation. For a time, KGST was the Fresno network affiliate for ESPN Deportes Radio, a Spanish-language sports service. After ESPN Deportes Radio closed in September 2019, KGST returned to a regional Mexican format branded solely as "AM 1600".

The Federal Communications Commission cancelled the station's license on August 13, 2026.
