= KCBL =

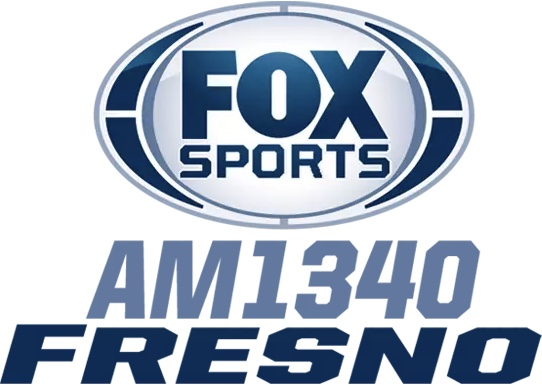
- Fresno, California; United States
- Broadcast area: Metropolitan Fresno
- Frequency: 1340 kHz
- Branding: Fox Sports AM 1340

Programming
- Format: Sports
- Network: Fox Sports Radio
- Affiliations: Los Angeles Dodgers

Ownership
- Owner: iHeartMedia, Inc.; (iHM Licenses, LLC)
- Sister stations: KALZ, KBOS-FM, KFBT, KFSO-FM, KHGE, KRDU, KRZR, KSOF

History
- First air date: July 23, 1953; 73 years ago (as KMAK)
- Former call signs: KMAK (1953–1988); KKAM (1988–1992); KBOS (1992–1993); KKTR (1993–1996)
- Call sign meaning: Former branding "The Ball"

Technical information
- Licensing authority: FCC
- Facility ID: 9749
- Class: C
- Power: 1,000 watts unlimited
- Transmitter coordinates: 36°45′51″N 119°47′12″W

Links
- Public license information: Public file; LMS
- Webcast: Listen Live
- Website: foxsportsradio1340.iheart.com

KCBL (1340 AM) is a broadcast radio station in the United States. Licensed to Fresno, California, KCBL is owned by iHeartMedia, Inc. and has a sports format. Most of its programming originates from Fox Sports Radio, and KCBL also broadcasts play-by-play coverage of the Los Angeles Dodgers.

Established in 1953 as KMAK, the station was locally owned for nearly four decades and had music formats in its early history, including top 40 for most of the 1960s and country from 1968 to 1986, before being a talk radio station from 1986 to 1996. The station has had its present call sign KCBL and sports format since December 16, 1996 and has been owned by iHeartMedia and predecessor companies since 1997.

== History ==
=== As KMAK (1953–1988) ===
The station was first licensed on July 23, 1953, licensed to the McMahan Company (later McMahan Broadcasting Company) with call sign KMAK and 250 watts of power.

In 1962, McMahan Broadcasting sold KMAK for $172,000 to Fresno Broadcasters Inc. KMAK became a top 40 station that year with personalities including Ron Jacobs and Robert W. Morgan, who would move on to Los Angeles station KHJ. By 1968, due to losing to KYNO in audience share, KMAK changed from top 40 to country music. The McCarthy Broadcasting Company bought KMAK from Fresno Broadcasters in December 1971 for $800,000.

McCarthy Broadcasting changed KMAK from country to news/talk in February 1986. Then in August 1986, McCarthy sold KMAK and KBOS-FM to Radio Fresno for a combined $6 million. In contrast to KMJ's mostly local lineup, KMAK broadcast mostly national talk shows such as The Larry King Show and The Rush Limbaugh Show.

=== As KKAM, KBOS, and KKTR (1988–1996) ===
On August 29, 1988, KMAK became KKAM, and the format changed to oldies on September 12. Although the station was profitable, station management made this change due to poor ratings. The playlist was sourced from the Satellite Music Network and covered the 1950s to 1970s. KKAM later changed to KBOS, the same letters as its FM sister station, on February 1, 1992. After being placed into receivership, the two stations were purchased for a combined $1.4 million by CenCal Broadcasting in June 1992.

KBOS changed to its previous talk format in January 1993, with a focus on national programming such as The Larry King Show; weekends had mostly ESPN Radio programs. The call signs changed to KKTR on March 1, 1993. Nearly four decades of local ownership ended in 1995 when Atlanta-based Patterson Broadcasting bought KBOS and KKTR from CenCal Broadcasting for $6.25 million total.

=== As KCBL (1996–present) ===
On December 16, 1996, after simulcasting KRZR-FM for a week, KKTR changed its call sign to the present KCBL and format to sports, with branding "The Ball" and programming mostly from the One on One Sports network (later The Sporting News Radio). Beginning in 1997, KCBL became the Fresno affiliate for the Los Angeles Dodgers Radio Network.

Capstar Broadcasting Partners bought KCBL and other Patterson Broadcasting stations in April 1997 for over $200 million. Capstar merged with Chancellor Media in July 1999 to form AMFM Inc.

In January 1999, KCBL added a simulcast in Visalia on KVBL. KCBL/KVBL had an ownership changes later in 1999 when Clear Channel Communications bought AMFM Inc. in October.

In August 2001, KCBL/KVBL signed with the USC Football Radio Network to broadcast USC Trojans football in Fresno/Visalia. KCBL/KVBL did not return to the USC network after the 2001 season.

Due to low ratings, specifically a 0.5 share in the first quarter of 2002, KCBL/KVBL switched its national network affiliation from Sporting News Radio to Fox Sports Radio in September 2002. Another program change in 2002 was the addition of Sacramento Kings basketball; KCBL/KVBL remained with the Kings until the 2006–07 season.

In 2005, KCBL/KVBL rejoined the USC Trojans Radio Network. Beginning in January 2006, KCBL's Visalia repeater changed call signs from KVBL to KEZL. KCBL/KEZL then was part of the Oakland Raiders Radio Network from 2006 to 2009. After the 2006 season, KCBL/KEZL lost the USC rights to KFPT.

KEZL became KRZR beginning October 2010. The simulcast on AM 1400 in Visalia ended on January 1, 2013, when KRZR changed to a conservative talk format.

In 2014, Clear Channel took on its current name iHeartMedia.

In June 2021, KCBL became the new flagship station for the Fresno State Bulldogs, leading a network of iHeartMedia stations throughout Central California. KCBL's affiliation with Fresno State continued through the 2025 season; the network moved back to KFIG the next year.

== Technical information ==
KCBL is a Class C AM station broadcasting with 1 kW non-directional signal. Its studios are located in northern Fresno near State Route 41 and Shaw Avenue.
