= KMGV =

- Fresno, California; United States
- Broadcast area: Fresno metropolitan area
- Frequency: 97.9 MHz
- Branding: Mega 97.9

Programming
- Format: Rhythmic oldies

Ownership
- Owner: Cumulus Media; (Cumulus Licensing LLC)
- Sister stations: KMJ, KMJ-FM, KSKS, KWYE

History
- First air date: March 15, 1948; 77 years ago
- Former call signs: KMJ-FM (1948–1981); KNAX (1981–1999)
- Call sign meaning: "Mega Variety"

Technical information
- Licensing authority: FCC
- Facility ID: 18409
- Class: B
- ERP: 2,100 watts
- HAAT: 611 meters (2,005 ft)
- Transmitter coordinates: 37°4′28.8″N 119°25′55.5″W

Links
- Public license information: Public file; LMS
- Webcast: Listen live
- Website: www.mega979.com

KMGV (97.9 FM) is a commercial radio station in Fresno, California. It is owned by Cumulus Media and it airs a rhythmic oldies radio format. The station's studios are in the Radio City building on West Shaw Avenue in North Fresno.

KMGV is a Class B station with an effective radiated power (ERP) of 2,100 watts. Its transmitter and tower are on Radio Lane in the Sierra National Forest, in Auberry, California.

== History ==
=== Classical and beautiful ===
The station signed on the air on March 15, 1948. It was originally owned by the McClatchy Company, publisher of The Fresno Bee daily newspaper. FM 97.9 was originally the sister station to KMJ (580 AM), and had the call sign KMJ-FM. Those call letters are now used on a co-owned station at 105.9 FM.

Known as "Music 98", KMJ-FM broadcast classical music for much of its early years. Its studios were at 3636 North First Street. It later switched to automated beautiful music.

=== Country music ===
In 1981, the call sign was changed to KNAX and the format was flipped to country music. KNAX's competition at that time was 1340 KMAK, an AM station that had adopted the country format around 1966. By 1985, KMAK had changed format to News/Talk. That left 97.9 KNAX as the sole country outlet for the Fresno area.

This lasted until 1992 when a station at 93.7 FM became "Kiss Country" KSKS. Both stations co-existed until KNAX was sold to Henry Broadcasting, which also owned KSKS. Management did not want to have two country stations competing with each other. The format of KNAX was altered to a mix of classic country with a few currents, while KSKS focused on contemporary country hits. KNAX adopted the nickname of "Kickin' Country 98", and the original KNAX logo was replaced.

In July 1996, KNAX and KRBT were sold from Osborn Communications to American Radio Systems, which would then sell to Infinity Broadcasting in 1998. Infinity Broadcasting was renamed CBS Radio in 2005.

=== Rhythmic oldies ===
On July 3, 1998, the owners decided to take KNAX in a different direction. The station dropped country music, switching to "Jammin' Oldies" a mix of Classic R&B, soul music and disco. The call letters became KMGV, and the moniker was changed to "Mega 97.9". In November 2006, Peak Broadcasting acquired KMGV and several other Fresno market stations from CBS Radio.

On August 30, 2013, a deal was announced in which Townsquare Media would purchase Peak Broadcasting, and then immediately swap Peak's Fresno stations, including KMGV, to Cumulus Media in exchange for Cumulus' stations in Dubuque, Iowa and Poughkeepsie, New York. The deal was part of Cumulus' acquisition of Dial Global; Peak, Townsquare, and Dial Global were all controlled by Oaktree Capital Management. The sale to Cumulus was completed on November 14, 2013.
