= KFBT =

- Hanford, California; United States
- Broadcast area: Fresno—Visalia, California
- Frequency: 103.7 MHz (HD Radio)
- Branding: 103.7 The Beat

Programming
- Format: Rhythmic adult contemporary

Ownership
- Owner: iHeartMedia; (iHM Licenses, LLC)
- Sister stations: KALZ, KBOS-FM, KCBL, KFSO-FM, KHGE, KRDU, KRZR, KSOF

History
- First air date: 1976
- Former call signs: KIOY (1976–1982); KMGX (1982–1989); KRZR (1989–2010)
- Call sign meaning: Kickin' to the Fresno's BeaT!

Technical information
- Licensing authority: FCC
- Facility ID: 48776
- Class: B
- ERP: 50,000 watts
- HAAT: 152 meters (499 ft)
- Transmitter coordinates: 36°33′12″N 119°45′10″W

Links
- Public license information: Public file; LMS
- Webcast: Listen Live
- Website: thebeat1037.iheart.com

KFBT (103.7 FM) is a commercial radio station that is licensed to Hanford, California and serves the Visalia—Tulare—Hanford and Fresno areas. The station is owned by iHeartMedia, Inc. and broadcasts a rhythmic adult contemporary format. The KFBT studios are located on Shaw Avenue in North Fresno, and the transmitter tower is south of Fresno near Caruthers.

KFBT broadcasts in HD radio.

== History ==
The station at 103.7 FM first signed on in 1976 as KIOY. In the late 1970s, the station broadcast a contemporary hit radio (CHR, also called top 40) format known as "K104 FM" from its studios in a vineyard between Fresno and Hanford.

=== KMGX (1982–1989) ===
In the early 1980s, the station changed its call sign to KMGX and its branding to "The New Magic 104 FM" while retaining the CHR format. Throughout the 1980s, KMGX remained competitive with rival KBOS, known at the time by the on-air moniker of "Rockradio K-Boss 95 FM". Playlists from 1985 show Magic 104 give heavy airplay to dance-oriented artists such as Sheena Easton, Prince, and Teena Marie, while K-Boss emphasized rock music from the likes of Billy Squier, Bruce Springsteen, and David Lee Roth.

In the late 1980s, KMGX adopted the moniker "The All New X104". X104 was one of the first radio stations in the U.S. to blend the CHR and urban format into a fully fledged "churban" format (later known as rhythmic contemporary). The station's appeal grew to dominant audience shares within Fresno's Latino community throughout the 1980s. At its peak in popularity, the station hosted the largest single Latino audience share of any general market radio station in the U.S. at 70 percent. KMGX's success is attributed to its high appeal among second- and third-generation Mexican Americans who gravitated towards morning drive host Richard Cano, as well as the popularity of evening host Kid Landon among younger listeners. The Fresno State alumnus served previously as a KYNO disc jockey and program director at KBOS, returning to Fresno in 1984 and claiming some of the highest morning ratings in the history of the market. Sales manager Chuck Lontine, who joined the station from the San Francisco radio market, created a "Spanglish" (bilingual English/Spanish) sales and marketing strategy that sustained the station throughout the 1980s. By the end of the decade, however, KMGX began to lose audience share to a growing number of Spanish-language stations in the market, leading to the discontinuation of the churban format in mid-1989.

=== KRZR (1989–2010) ===
Logo for KRZR as a rock station, used until October 2010.

In June 1989, KGMX flipped to a current-based rock format, changing its call sign to KRZR in August. This new iteration of 103.7 FM was launched by Southern California broadcasting veteran Jim Votaw, X104 exec Chuck Lontine, and programmer Brian Burns. At the time, the station was owned by Olympia Broadcasting of Seattle. KRZR introduced the "Rock 40" format — a youth-targeted hybrid of CHR and album-oriented rock that combines the formatics of the former with the music mix of the latter — to the Fresno radio market. (This concept later evolved to what is now known as active rock, and KRZR was one of the first stations to air that format.) The station was initially patterned after Olympia's successful Rock 40 station KXXR in Kansas City, Missouri and Westwood One-owned KQLZ (Pirate Radio) in Los Angeles. KRZR's first slogan was "Today's Rock 'N' Roll", and the station played glam metal artists and those representing related subgenres of hard rock who otherwise would have difficulty getting radio airplay. One prominent promotion was a weekly giveaway of $10,000 to randomly spotted owners of cars sporting the station's bumper/window stickers, who called into the studio within an allotted time.

The original KRZR airstaff included program director E. Curtis Johnson (previously with KCAQ in Oxnard), music director and afternoon drive host Brian Degus (known on-air as "McFly"), morning show host Pete Hansen, and newswoman Kelly Boom. Midday shifts were filled by Kevin Musso ("Nick NRG") and Larry "Sparky" Long ("Larry The Pocket Producer") — the latter an 18-year-old high school intern from Clovis. Rounding out the staff were Chris Daniel in evenings and Scott Stevens in overnights, and part-time/weekender, Dave Rodgers, who also worked for two years at KMGX X104. Dave was the last DJ on KMGX when it flipped. In July 1989, former KCLQ DJ Clay Steiner (using the on-air name "Matt 'The Healer' Clayton") hired on for weekends and overnights. Long was hired that same month for fill-in shifts.

KRZR had a mascot known as "The Wild Hare", created by Johnson in 1993. According to him, the hare represented the irreverent attitude of the station and its rock mix. KRZR used the Wild Hare on a variety of promotional materials, including a series of T-shirts with puns referring to rock bands, or people or events in popular culture (examples included "Haretallica", "Bat-Hare Forever", and Tig-Hare Woods"). The station was so popular that management had trouble meeting the heavy demand for promotional materials, often selling out of T-shirts.

Shortly after the debut of KRZR, both Burns and Lontine left the company. Brian Burns became a renowned program consultant and radio programmer, while Chuck Lontine joined WLS in Chicago. Kevin Musso became a television weatherman in Fresno. Pete Hansen eventually moved on to The DSC Show at KGB-FM in San Diego; he also hosts a podcast, The Pete Hansen Show. Larry "Sparky" Long now lives and works in Northern California. E. Curtis Johnson remained in the Fresno market after leaving KRZR in 2007, assuming the program director position at One Putt Broadcasting from 2008 to 2014, followed by the same role at Lotus Communications' active rock outlet KKBZ in April 2019. Dave Rodgers (Ken Richards) remained on KRZR until October 2003, continued at KJUG FM in Visalia from 2004 to 2011, and since 2014 has worked weekends at KUZZ in Bakersfield.

=== KFBT (2010–present) ===
Old logo used until the summer of 2020

On October 6, 2010, at noon, after playing Rage Against the Machine's "Freedom", KRZR changed its format from active rock to rhythmic adult contemporary. The station changed its call letters to KFBT and its branding to "103.7 The Beat". The KRZR personalities were dismissed and the rock format moved to the station's HD2 digital subchannel. The first song on The Beat was "Get Ready for This" by 2 Unlimited.

== HD Radio ==
KFBT broadcasts in HD Radio on two digital subchannels:

- KFBT-HD1 airs a digital simulcast of the analog signal.
- KFBT-HD2 broadcasts a Hispanic rhythmic format known as "Fiesta Latina", a bilingual presentation featuring urban, pop, and regional Mexican music. The station's slogan is "Mix Latin Urban, Pop & Regional Mexican".
