= KHGE =

Coordinates: 36.819°N 119.510°W

- Fresno, California; United States
- Broadcast area: Fresno, California
- Frequency: 102.7 MHz (HD Radio)
- Branding: 102.7 The Wolf

Programming
- Format: Country
- Affiliations: Premiere Networks

Ownership
- Owner: iHeartMedia; (iHM Licenses, LLC)
- Sister stations: KALZ, KBOS-FM, KCBL, KFBT, KFSO-FM, KRDU, KRZR, KSOF

History
- First air date: 1962 (as KKNU)
- Former call signs: KREN (CP, 5/27/1959-9/21/1959); KXQR (1959–1969); KKNU (1969–1988); KTHT (1988–1998); KALZ (1998–2005); KEZL (2005–2006); KCTZ (1/5/2006-1/19/2006)
- Call sign meaning: HuGE, different word for Big (format based)

Technical information
- Licensing authority: FCC
- Facility ID: 48777
- Class: B
- ERP: 50,000 watts
- HAAT: 152 meters (499 ft)

Links
- Public license information: Public file; LMS
- Webcast: Listen Live
- Website: 1027thewolf.iheart.com

KHGE (102.7 FM, "102.7 The Wolf") is a commercial country radio station in Fresno, California, owned and operated by iHeartMedia. Its studios are located on Shaw Avenue in North Fresno, and the transmitter tower is east of Clovis.

KHGE broadcasts two channels in HD. The HD-2 channel was known as "Salsa Bembé", with dance music in Spanish. The HD2 subchannel has since been turned off.

== History ==
KKNU - Easy Listening - (1962 through 1985) KKNU signed on the air in 1962 airing an easy listening music format programmed by Jim Schulke and branded as "Easy 103" until 1985.

KKNU - Soft Adult Contemporary - (1985 through March 1988) KKNU aired a soft adult contemporary music format from 1985 until March 1988 branded as "103 FM". During most of this time, KKNU was also known as "The Love Song Station" which blended romantic music with what they called "Champagne Jazz", or lite contemporary jazz.

KTHT - Contemporary Hit Radio - (April 1988 through September 1989) KTHT aired a contemporary hit radio format in April 1988 and it was branded as "K-Hit 102.7" until September 1989.

The programming change from soft adult contemporary music to contemporary hit music on April Fools' Day 1988 began as a publicity stunt staged by morning show personality Nick Ryan, who barricaded himself in the control room all day to protest the soft adult contemporary format which he characterized as "wimpy music".

KTHT re-branded to "Thunder 102.7" in September 1989.

KTHT re-branded to "The New Mix 102.7" in 1992, led by Program Director Jon Zellner, who also hosted PM Drive.

KALZ - Modern Adult Contemporary - (April 1, 1998 through January 2, 2006)

- KALZ aired a modern adult contemporary music format from April 1, 1998, until January 2, 2006, branded as "Alice 102.7 FM" The modern adult contemporary music format was moved to 96.7 FM retaining the call letters, KALZ, and "Alice" branding.

Big Country 102.7 logo

KCTZ/KHGE - Country - January 2, 2006 KHGE began airing country music programming on 102.7 FM on January 2, 2006, branded as "Cat Country" using the Federal Communications Commission (FCC) call letters, KCTZ. KHGE re-branded to "Big Country 102.7" on June 19, 2006; a change of FCC call letters followed to KHGE.

On December 26, 2010, following a stunt of country Christmas music, Big Country 102.7 was re-branded as "102.7 The Wolf". The first song under the new branding was "Turn On the Radio" by Reba McEntire, whose version of "Up On the Housetop" had been the last song in KHGE's holiday music stunt.
