= KFSO-FM =

- Visalia, California; United States
- Broadcast area: Fresno/Visalia/Tulare
- Frequency: 92.9 MHz (HD Radio)
- Branding: La Preciosa 92.9

Programming
- Language: Spanish
- Format: Spanish adult hits

Ownership
- Owner: iHeartMedia, Inc.; (iHM Licenses, LLC)
- Sister stations: KALZ, KBOS-FM, KCBL, KFBT, KHGE, KRDU, KRZR, KSOF

History
- First air date: September 1, 1961; 64 years ago
- Former call signs: KONG-FM (1961–1984); KNTN (1984–1985); KFSO (1985–1992)
- Call sign meaning: FreSnO

Technical information
- Licensing authority: FCC
- Facility ID: 2099
- Class: B
- ERP: 17,500 watts
- HAAT: 260 meters (850 ft)
- Transmitter coordinates: 36°38′10.00″N 118°56′34.00″W

Links
- Public license information: Public file; LMS
- Webcast: Listen Live
- Website: lapreciosa929.iheart.com

KFSO-FM (92.9 MHz) is a radio station broadcasting a Spanish adult hits format. Licensed to Visalia, California, United States, it serves the Fresno/Visalia/Tulare area. The station is currently owned by iHeartMedia, Inc. Its studios are located on Shaw Avenue in North Fresno, and the transmitter tower is in Visalia.

KFSO-FM broadcasts in HD.

Prior to Spanish, the station played Oldies calling itself "92.9 K-FRESNO" and later "KOOL 92.9."

== Previous logo ==
92.9 K-Fresno Kool 92.9
