= KRZR =

Repeater of KALZ, Fowler, CA
- Visalia, California; United States
- Broadcast area: Tulare County, California
- Frequency: 1400 kHz (HD Radio)
- Branding: PowerTalk 96.7

Programming
- Format: Talk radio
- Network: Fox News Radio
- Affiliations: Fresno State Bulldogs; Premiere Networks

Ownership
- Owner: iHeartMedia, Inc.; (iHM Licenses, LLC)
- Sister stations: KALZ, KBOS-FM, KCBL, KFBT, KFSO-FM, KHGE, KRDU, KSOF

History
- First air date: December 5, 1946
- Former call signs: KKIN (1948–1951); KONG (1952–1984); KNDE (1984–1985); KVIS (1985–1988); KODS (1988); KHTZ (1988–1990); KEYX (1990–1994); KTHX (1994–1999); KVBL (1999–2006); KEZL (2006–2010)

Technical information
- Licensing authority: FCC
- Facility ID: 2096
- Class: C
- Power: 1,000 watts (unlimited)
- Transmitter coordinates: 36°21′13.8″N 119°17′5.4″W

Links
- Public license information: Public file; LMS
- Webcast: Listen live (via iHeartRadio)
- Website: powertalk967.iheart.com

KRZR (1400 AM) is a commercial radio station licensed to Visalia, California, United States, serving Tulare County as a full-time simulcast of talk-formatted KALZ (96.7 FM). Owned by iHeartMedia, KRZR broadcasts conservative talk shows, Fox News Radio, and Fresno State Bulldogs sports. Studios are located in Fresno, California, and the transmitter is in Visalia.

The station was founded in 1946 as KKIN and was locally owned until 1957. For much of its early history, the station had multiple call signs and different music formats, such as MOR, country, and oldies. The station has been owned by iHeartMedia and its predecessor companies since being purchased by Chancellor Broadcasting in 1998.

Beginning in 1999, the station simulcast co-owned stations from Fresno. From 1999 to 2006, the station had call sign KVBL and simulcast sports station KCBL; KVBL changed to KEZL in 2006 and continued the KCBL simulcast, then took on its current call sign KRZR in 2010. KRZR's format changed from sports to talk as a simulcast of KALZ.

== History ==
=== As KKIN (1946–1951) ===
The first construction permit to broadcast on frequency 1400 kHz from Visalia was issued by the FCC on March 27, 1946 for radio station KKIN. KKIN was founded by KKIN Inc., whose owner was local car dealer D.O. Kinnie. On June 6, 1947, the FCC granted a broadcasting license for KKIN to broadcast with 250 watts of power. The Visalia Times-Delta reported in late November 1946 that KKIN would begin broadcasting December 3 that year, quoting station manager Stanley S. Simpson: "...KKIN is coming into the radio field with local features and will be the first music and news station in the central San Joaquin valley." But on December 4, the Times-Delta reported a further delay due to bad weather slowing air mail delivery of the FCC's approval documents to Visalia.

Eventually, KKIN first signed on at 6 p.m. on December 5, 1946; it would broadcast at 250 watts of power between 6 a.m. to midnight daily. KKIN broadcast news from the United Press. Also among KKIN's early programming was a daily hour at 6 a.m. of Spanish music and news provided by Radio Programas de México.

In February 1947, KKIN broadcast a local concert by country music artist Tex Ritter.

For Public Schools Week, students from Visalia Senior High School were guest writers and announcers on April 23, 1951; the station manager praised their performances, saying that the day went by "without a hitch".

In November 1951, KKIN Inc. sold KKIN for $37,500 to the Tulare County Broadcasting Company; the sale was finalized December 31.

=== As KONG (1952–1984) ===
Beginning January 1, 1952, KKIN changed its call sign to KONG.

In 1955, KONG was transferred to The Voice of Fresno, the company that owned KYNO in Fresno, in a five-year rental contract at $5,000 annually with an option to buy the station for $10,000 after the fifth year.

On June 1, 1957, Air Waves Inc. closed a $35,000 purchase of KONG; Air Waves Inc. was owned by Harry C. Layman of Phoenix, Arizona. Air Waves started a KONG-FM station on 92.9 MHz in 1961. By 1965, KONG increased its daytime power to 1 kW while reducing to 250 watts at night; KONG also broadcast 10 hours of Spanish programs per week (now broadcasting as KFSO).

KONG joined the ABC Information Network around 1973; the 1973 Broadcasting Yearbook also listed KONG's format as MOR.

Air Waves Inc. sold the KONG AM and FM stations to 2588 Newport Corporation for $600,000 plus a $100,000 non-compete clause in 1978.

In 1980, KONG changed its national network affiliation from ABC to CBS.

=== Various callsigns (1984–1999) ===
KONG changed its call sign to KNDE in 1984. The change occurred as a group from Seattle, Washington, sought the KONG calls for a planned television station in that market.

In April 1985, Americom II purchased KNDE and KNTN-FM for $1.3 million. The call sign changed from KNDE to KVIS in June 1985, and Americom also changed the longtime format of MOR to country music. KVIS had another format change, from country to oldies in 1987.

The callsigns continued to have multiple changes throughout the 1980s and 1990s, to KODS for one week in September 1988; KHTZ beginning September 25, 1988; KEYX from January 12, 1990; and KTHX from August 17, 1994. In 1998, Chancellor Broadcasting purchased KTHX.

=== Sports format as KVBL and KEZL (1999–2010) ===
On January 15, 1999, the station became KVBL, a simulcast of sports station KCBL in Fresno.

In August 2001, KCBL/KVBL signed with the USC Football Radio Network to broadcast USC Trojans football in Fresno/Visalia. KCBL/KVBL did not return to the USC network after the 2001 season.

Due to low ratings, specifically a 0.5 share in the first quarter of 2002, KCBL/KVBL switched its national network affiliation from Sporting News Radio to Fox Sports Radio in September 2002. Another program change in 2002 was the addition of Sacramento Kings basketball; KCBL/KVBL remained with the Kings until the 2006–07 season.

In 2005, KCBL/KVBL rejoined the USC Trojans Radio Network.

Beginning in January 2006, KVBL became KEZL. KEZL retained its simulcast of KCBL; the pair of stations was with the Oakland Raiders Radio Network from 2006 to 2009. After the 2006 season, KCBL/KEZL lost the USC rights to KFPT.

=== Talk format as KRZR (2010–present) ===
KEZL became KRZR beginning October 2010. KRZR continued to simulcast KCBL until January 1, 2013, when KRZR changed to a conservative talk format simulcast with KALZ in Fowler.

In February 2022, KALZ/KRZR signed a contract with the Bulldog Sports Network to broadcast Fresno State Bulldogs football, men's basketball, and baseball games, in addition to the network's existing contract with KCBL.

== Programming ==
The weekday schedule on KALZ/KRZR has conservative talk shows, with local shows during the 3 to 7 p.m. afternoon drive hours and nationally syndicated programs during other hours including The Glenn Beck Program, The Sean Hannity Show, and Coast to Coast AM. KALZ/KRZR also carries Fresno State Bulldogs sports live on the Bulldog Sports Network along with sister station KCBL.

== Technical information ==
KRZR's transmitter tower is located in northern Visalia. Its studios are located in northern Fresno near State Route 41 and Shaw Avenue.
