= KRDU =

- Dinuba, California; United States
- Broadcast area: Fresno-Visalia, California
- Frequency: 1130 kHz
- Branding: KRDU 1130am

Programming
- Format: Religious

Ownership
- Owner: iHeartMedia, Inc.; (iHM Licenses, LLC)
- Sister stations: KALZ, KBOS-FM, KCBL, KFBT, KFSO-FM, KHGE, KRZR, KSOF

History
- First air date: 1947
- Call sign meaning: Radio Dinuba (original owner)

Technical information
- Licensing authority: FCC
- Facility ID: 54559
- Class: B
- Power: 5,000 watts (day); 6,200 watts (night)
- Transmitter coordinates: 36°29′2.8″N 119°16′0.4″W

Links
- Public license information: Public file; LMS
- Webcast: Listen live (via iHeartRadio)
- Website: krdu1130.iheart.com

KRDU (1130 AM) is a commercial radio station licensed to Dinuba, California, United States, and serving the Fresno-Visalia market. It airs a religious format and is owned by iHeartMedia, Inc. KRDU is regarded as America's first commercial Christian radio station. The studios are located on Shaw Avenue in North Fresno.

KRDU's transmitter is sited off Road 136 in Cutler, California. As of 2019, KRDU is the radio home of the Fresno Grizzlies, a Pacific Coast League Triple A minor league baseball team connected with the Colorado Rockies.

== History ==
KRDU signed on the air on December 26, 1948, at 1130 kilocycles. It was owned by the Radio Dinuba Company with studios on L Street. The call sign represents Radio DinUba. At first it was a daytimer, required to go off the air at night and powered at only 250 watts. In 1949, it moved to 1240 kHz with 250 watts full-time.

In 1961, it moved back to 1130 kHz with full-time authorization, powered at 1,000 watts around the clock. In 1975, it added an FM station, KLTA (now KSOF, still co-owned with KRDU).

In the 1990s, the power was increased to its current 5,000 watts days and 6,200 watts nights. In 1999, KRDU was acquired by AMFM, Inc. AMFM was acquired by Clear Channel Communications, which later changed its name to iHeartMedia.
