= KXTK =

- Arroyo Grande, California; United States
- Broadcast area: San Luis Obispo County, California
- Frequency: 1280 kHz
- Branding: ESPN 1280 AM & 101.7 FM The Ticket

Programming
- Format: Sports
- Affiliations: ESPN Radio; Cal Poly Mustangs; Los Angeles Dodgers Radio Network; Los Angeles Lakers Radio Network; Las Vegas Raiders; Los Angeles Rams; Westwood One

Ownership
- Owner: Rip Curl Broadcasting LLC
- Sister stations: KKJL

History
- First air date: 1962

Technical information
- Licensing authority: FCC
- Facility ID: 36026
- Class: B
- Power: 10,000 watts (day); 2,500 watts (night)
- Transmitter coordinates: 35°8′43.9″N 120°31′18.6″W
- Translator: 101.7 K269GY (San Luis Obispo)

Links
- Public license information: Public file; LMS
- Webcast: Listen live (via TuneIn)
- Website: espnradio1280.com

KXTK (1280 AM, "ESPN Radio 1280") is a commercial radio station licensed to Arroyo Grande, California, United States, and serves the San Luis Obispo County area. The station is owned by Pacific Coast Media LLC and broadcasts sports programming from ESPN Radio.

KXTK is the Central Coast affiliate of several professional and college sports teams, including the Las Vegas Raiders, the Los Angeles Lakers, and the Cal Poly Mustangs.

== History ==
The station first signed on June 29, 1962, as KCJH. In July 1965, KCJH changed its call letters to KOAG. In November 1971, the station adopted the KFYV call sign.

The station changed its call letters to KKAL on May 7, 1979. It became KKOM on March 16, 1999, then KXTK on September 25, 2002.

== Affiliations ==
KXTK is an affiliate of several professional and collegiate sports teams, providing coverage of their games to the San Luis Obispo County area. The station airs contests involving the Las Vegas Raiders and San Francisco 49ers of the National Football League, the Los Angeles Dodgers and San Francisco Giants of Major League Baseball, and the Los Angeles Lakers and Golden State Warriors of the National Basketball Association. The station also broadcasts Cal Poly Mustangs athletic contests in the NCAA as well as NFL football games on Sunday, Monday, and Thursday from Westwood One.
