= KSOF (FM) =

Radio station in Dinuba–Fresno, California

- Dinuba, California; United States
- Broadcast area: Fresno and Visalia metropolitan areas
- Frequency: 98.9 MHz (HD Radio)
- Branding: Soft Rock 98.9

Programming
- Format: Adult contemporary
- Affiliations: Compass Media Networks; Premiere Networks

Ownership
- Owner: iHeartMedia, Inc.; (iHM Licenses, LLC)
- Sister stations: KALZ, KBOS-FM, KCBL, KFBT, KFSO-FM, KHGE, KRDU, KRZR

History
- First air date: June 5, 1975
- Former call signs: KLTA (1975–1983); KOJY (1983–1990); KJOI (1990–1997)
- Call sign meaning: Soft rock

Technical information
- Licensing authority: FCC
- Facility ID: 54560
- Class: B
- ERP: 19,000 watts
- HAAT: 250 meters (820 ft)
- Transmitter coordinates: 36°38′11.80″N 118°56′33.6″W

Links
- Public license information: Public file; LMS
- Webcast: Listen live (via iHeartRadio)
- Website: softrock989.iheart.com

KSOF (98.9 FM, "Soft Rock 98.9") is a commercial radio station licensed to Dinuba, California, United States, owned by iHeartMedia and serving the Fresno and Visalia metropolitan areas. KSOF carries an adult contemporary format. KSOF's studios and offices are on Shaw Avenue in North Fresno.

KSOF's transmitter is sited off Pierce Valley Drive atop Eshom Point, in Badger, California. KSOF also broadcasts in HD Radio and is available online via iHeartRadio.

== History ==
On June 5, 1975, the station signed on as KLTA. It was the FM counterpart of KRDU (1130 AM). They were owned by the Dinuba Radio Company with studios on North Alta Avenue.

On October 26, 1983, the station changed its call sign to KOJY, calling itself "K-Joy." On February 12, 1990, the station changed its call letters to KJOI. Then on October 17, 1997, it switched to the current KSOF.

In the mid-1970s through the early 1990s, the station had an easy listening format. In late 1990, the station switched to a soft adult contemporary format and was named "Lite FM". The station used the "Lite" name until October 1997, when it became "Soft Rock 98.9". In the early 2000s, KSOF moved into a mainstream AC direction.

In October 2008, former Portland, Oregon, radio personality Teri Ann Schlesser became the midday DJ, music director and public service director. Formerly with the Nelson & Terry Show on KRSK, Schlesser replaced Kristen Kelley who moved on to program another radio station.

On the morning of October 27, 2011, morning hosts "Brady and Rose" (Mike Brady and Rose Ortega) were replaced by "Bronson and Christine" (Bob Bronson and Christine Nagy) from New York City sister station WLTW. In 2018, Schlesser moved into the morning drive time shift, the station's only live DJ. Schlesser was later replaced with Valentine in the Morning from KBIG Los Angeles.
