= Andrés Cantor =

Argentine football commentator

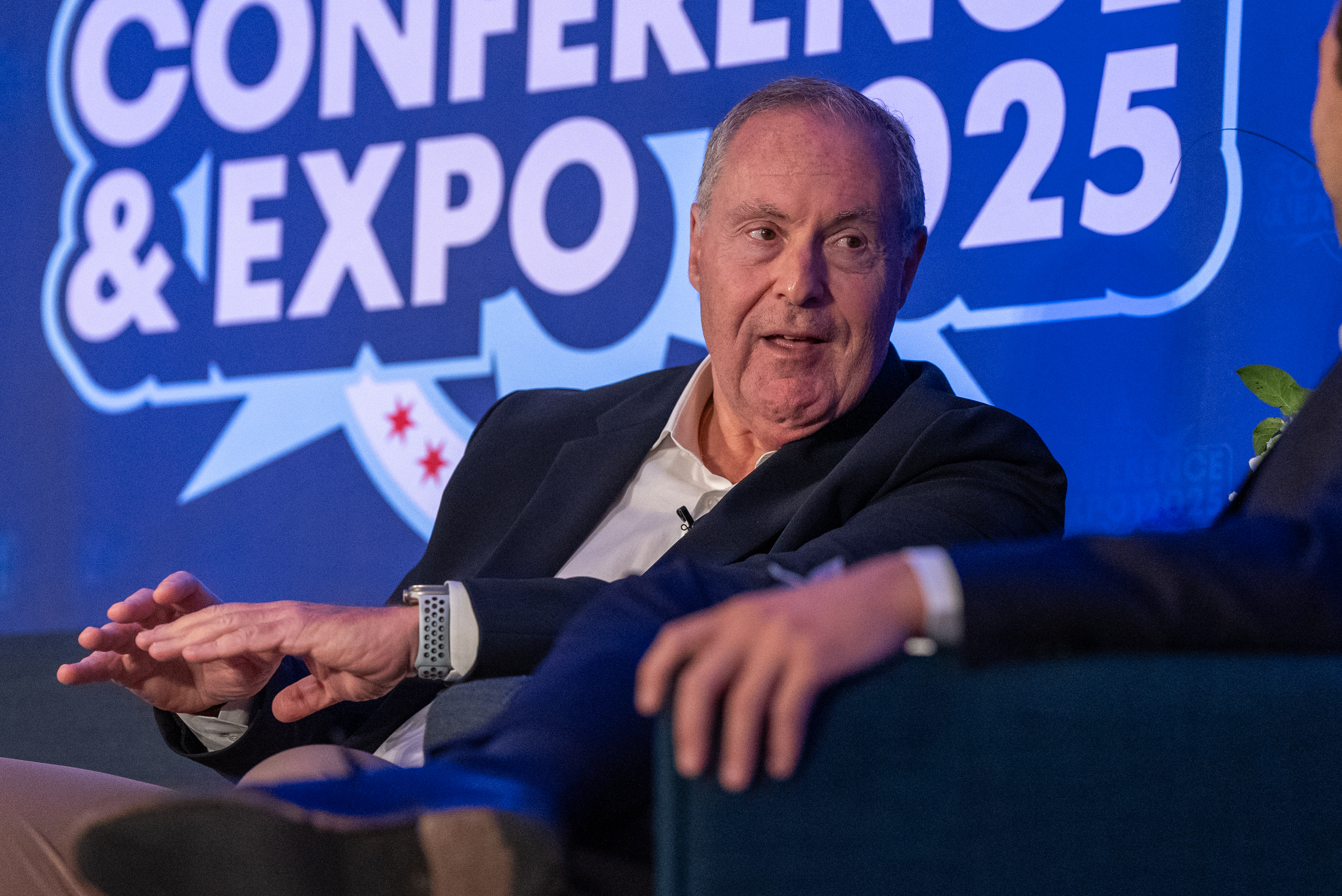
- Andres Cantor at the 2025 conference of the National Association of Hispanic Journalists
- Born: December 22, 1962 (age 63); Buenos Aires, Argentina
- Citizenship: USA, Argentina
- Occupations: Television journalist, television personality, sports anchor, author
- Years active: 1979–present
- Website: www.fdpradio.com

Andrés Cantor (born December 22, 1962) is an Argentine sportscaster and pundit who works in the United States providing Spanish-language commentary and analysis in sports. Cantor is well known among both Spanish and English speakers for his narration of association football matches, and shouting "¡Goooooool!" when a goal is scored.

== Early life ==
Cantor was born in Buenos Aires, Argentina. He moved with his family to the Southern California area when he was a teen, where he attended San Marino High School and then graduated from the University of Southern California, majoring in print journalism. Andrés is Jewish.

His mother was born in Romania, and migrated to Argentina at the age of 13, while his father was born in Argentina. His paternal grandparents were Jews from Poland, and fled during the Nazi occupation. His favorite team is Boca Juniors from Argentina.

== Professional career ==
Cantor is famous for his bellowing of "¡Goooooool!" after a score in football. José María Muñoz, a famous Argentine journalist who began narrating on radio in the 1940s, is widely considered the father of "peligro de gol" "danger of goal being scored", "gol, gol, gol, goooooool", etc. His style has been imitated by prominent football narrators throughout Latin America, Italy, MENA, Romania, the Balkans, Portugal, and Spain. The call actually originated on Brazilian radio and television.

It was largely absent from the lexicon of British play-by-play commentators prior to Cantor joining Univision in 1987. Cantor was the first to introduce this climactic scoring call to a U.S. audience while working at Univision, making him popular with English-speaking viewers. He first used it at the 1990 FIFA World Cup, but it became especially popular during the 1994 World Cup, which was held in the United States. Cantor made guest appearances on the Late Show with David Letterman during the '94 and '98 tournaments, and after those tournaments were over. He was broadcasting from Paris for the Late Show during the 1998 World Cup. The call was, at one point, even being sold as a ringtone on Telemundo's website. He says that Diego Maradona's goal at the 1986 World Cup, in which he ran from midfield past five English defenders to score, brought tears to his eyes (Cantor was working at the game). That goal became known as the "Goal of the Century", and took place after the infamous "Hand of God" goal. The yell was also used in a Volkswagen commercial that aired in the U.S. around the time of the 1998 World Cup.

Another unique line of Cantor's can be heard whenever a game reaches half-time or is over (including in extra time). He delivers the line, "El árbitro dice que no hay tiempo para más" ("The referee says there is no time for more").

=== Telemundo Deportes ===
Cantor currently works for Telemundo Deportes, NBC Sports's Spanish-language division, and does play-by-play for matches on both Telemundo and its sister cable network Universo. Omar Zerón joins him as a color commentator for most games. At the 2004 Summer Olympics, where Telemundo was the first-ever U.S. Spanish-language network to broadcast the Olympics, Cantor worked as both a studio anchor and the play-by-play announcer for baseball. He went to Telemundo after several years at Univisión. Telemundo's other anchor for the games, Jessí Losada, worked with Cantor at Univisión before also leaving. XM Satellite Radio, in partnership with Cantor, launched a Spanish-language sports network.

Cantor anchored Telemundo's coverage of the 2012 Summer Olympics in London from the network's studios in Hialeah, Florida. He was also the play-by-play announcer for football during the games. Cantor anchored as chief commentator for Telemundo's coverage of the 2022 FIFA World Cup. During that year's World Cup Final, as Gonzalo Montiel kicked the shootout-winning penalty for Argentina, Cantor broke into tears on the live broadcast as he called the team from his home country World Cup champions.

Cantor continued as Telemundo's play-by-play announcer for the 2026 World Cup, first calling Germany's 7-1 win over Curaçao, held in Houston, but, afterward, only called games featuring his native Argentina, up to, and including, what would turn out to be second consecutive World Cup final appearance.

=== Futbol de Primera Radio Network ===
Cantor is the owner and main play-by-play announcer of Futbol de Primera, a radio network which owns the Spanish-language radio rights of the FIFA World Cups since 2002. FDP also broadcasts the Mexico national team, CONCACAF Gold Cup, Copa América (CONMEBOL) among other sports properties. He hosts a daily show, Futbol de Primera, which airs nationally on more than 100 affiliates.

=== NBC Sports ===
Cantor's first English-language assignment was the 2000 Summer Olympics in Sydney, where he called both men's and women's football with Alexi Lalas and Amy Allmann respectively for NBC, complete with his signature call of "Goooooool!" At the 2008 Summer Olympics in Beijing, Cantor provided only Spanish-language commentary for sister network Telemundo.

Cantor had performed both English and Spanish-language broadcasts for the 2020 Summer Olympics in Tokyo in 2021.

=== Netflix ===
On September 18, 2026, Netflix announced that Cantor was joining its broadcast team for the 2027 FIFA Women's World Cup.

== Other notable accomplishments ==
In 2008, Cantor appeared in the American live-action film Speed Racer as one of the grand Prix announcers.

Cantor is the author of the book Goooal! a Celebration of Football. Andres Cantor's appearance booking fee can range from $5,000 to $10,000.

In 2010, Cantor was featured in the Mike McGlone series of GEICO commercials where he is introduced as an announcer who could make any sport exciting. Subsequently, the camera cuts to him animatedly announcing a chess match.

In 2011, he is uncredited for the role of the Spanish football announcer in an episode of the Disney Channel series Phineas and Ferb.

U.S. show Person of Interest used his 'Gooooool' in the episode "Cura te Ipsum." When Reese and Fusco confront the drug dealers at their apartment, there is a goal scored during a football match on television. The famous "Goooooool", seen in the U.S. on NBC's Deportes Telemundo network, can be heard in the background.

In 2014, Cantor was featured in an ad campaign for Volkswagen of America. The campaign was launched for the 2014 FIFA World Cup, and depicts him offering play-by-play announcing while his son Nicolas drives a new Volkswagen Golf GTI.

Cantor was featured as an announcer in the Walt Disney film Muppets Most Wanted in March 2014.

He voiced himself in The Simpsons episode "You Don't Have to Live Like a Referee".

== Awards ==
In 1994, Cantor was honored as "Sports Personality of the Year" by the American Sportscaster Association. He won a regional Emmy Award for his play-by-play work during the U.S. World Cup 1994. In 2004, Cantor received the Hispanic Heritage Award. Also that year he won the Broadcasting & Cable/Multichannel News Lifetime Achievement Award in Hispanic Television at the Hispanic Television Summit, produced by Schramm Marketing Group. In 2005, Cantor received an honorary Emmy from the NATPE for his contributions to Hispanic television. In 2014, Cantor received an Emmy at the 35th annual Sports Emmy Awards for best on-air personality in Spanish. FIFA Magazine named Cantor as one of the world's most legendary broadcasters.

In 2020, the National Soccer Hall of Fame announced that Cantor would be named the 2020 Colin Jose Media Award recipient for his significant long-term contributions to soccer in the United States Due to the COVID-19 pandemic, Cantor was awarded at the 2021 ceremony in Frisco, Texas.

Cantor has received a total of six Emmys.

== Personal life ==
Cantor's son, Nico, contributes to CBS Sports' UEFA Champions League and UEFA Europa League coverage and hosts The Golazo! Show, a live whip-around program on CBS Sports Network that debuted during the group stage of the 2020–21 Champions League season.

== See also ==
- List of Jews in sports (non-players)
