= KKBZ =

- Auberry, California; United States
- Broadcast area: Fresno, California
- Frequency: 105.1 MHz (HD Radio)
- Branding: Caliente 105.1

Programming
- Format: Spanish urban
- Affiliations: United Stations Radio Networks

Ownership
- Owner: Lotus Communications; (Lotus Fresno Corp.)
- Sister stations: KLBN; KSEQ; KHIT-FM; KGST

History
- First air date: July 12, 1992 (as KSLK)
- Former call signs: KXDR (1990–1992, CP); KSLK (1992–1994); KGST-FM (1994–1995); KLBN (1995–2008)
- Call sign meaning: "Blaze" (previous branding)

Technical information
- Licensing authority: FCC
- Facility ID: 38455
- Class: B1
- ERP: 4,700 watts
- HAAT: 234 meters (768 ft)
- Transmitter coordinates: 36°56′54.8″N 119°29′12.5″W

Links
- Public license information: Public file; LMS
- Website: caliente1051.com

KKBZ (105.1 FM, "Caliente 105.1") is an American radio station broadcasting a Spanish urban format. Licensed to Auberry, California, the station serves the greater Fresno/Clovis area. The station is owned by Lotus Communications. Its studios are located just north of downtown Fresno.

== History ==
The station was assigned call sign KXDR on July 12, 1990. On March 27, 1992, the station changed its call sign to KSLK, on October 7, 1994, to KGST-FM, on August 1, 1995, to KLBN, and on May 5, 2008, to KKBZ. At that time, the station picked up what would be its most prominent format, active rock as "105.1 The Blaze". The station made headlines when they fired their very popular morning show "Jen Lipp in the Morning", hosted by largely popular morning rock DJ Jennifer Lipp and co-hosted by a new-to-the business Kris DeVold. The station got major backlash from social media as well as local press. They then cycled through a syndicated morning show out of Sacramento only to eventually return to an all-music morning.

On May 3, 2023, KKBZ rebranded as "Rock 105.1".

On March 1, 2025, at midnight, after signing off the rock format with "Sad But True" by Metallica, KKBZ flipped to a hybrid Spanish/English language rhythmic contemporary format as "Caliente 105.1". The first song on "Caliente" was "Baile Inolvidable" by Bad Bunny.

== Previous programming ==
The previous weekday lineup included music in the mornings followed by a 105-minute commercial-free music block. The mid-day shift allows listeners to make requests and win concert tickets, prizes, and food. Sixx Sense with Nikki Sixx of Mötley Crüe airs overnight. Weekends included Dee Snider with a 2-hour show called House Of Hair which features hair and metal bands from the 1980s. In 2016, the station was made an affiliate for the Los Angeles Rams.
