= KYNO =

Radio station in Fresno, California

Coordinates: 36°29′19.8″N 119°19′36.4″W

- Fresno, California; United States
- Broadcast area: Central California
- Frequency: 940 kHz
- Branding: KYNO 940 AM

Programming
- Format: Oldies
- Affiliations: Compass Media Networks

Ownership
- Owner: John and Katrina Ostlund
- Sister stations: KJWL

History
- First air date: August 18, 1937 (as KFRE)
- Former call signs: KFRE (1937–2000); KWRU (2000–2010); KYNO (2010–2012); KFIG (2012–2021)
- Former frequencies: 1190 kHz (1937–1939); 890 kHz (1939–1941); 920 kHz (1941–1942)

Technical information
- Licensing authority: FCC
- Facility ID: 18407
- Class: B
- Power: 50,000 watts

Links
- Public license information: Public file; LMS
- Webcast: Listen live
- Website: www.kynofresno.com

KYNO (940 AM) is a radio station licensed to Fresno, California, and is owned by John Ostlund and Katrina Ostlund. KYNO airs an oldies format, switching to Christmas music for much of December. KYNO's radio studios and offices are on Fulton Street in Fresno and its transmitter is off Avenue 384 in Monson, California.

KYNO operates with 50,000 watts around the clock, the highest power permitted for American AM radio stations. Its daytime signal provides at least secondary coverage to all of the Central Valley and part of the Central Coast and Monterey Bay. But because AM 940 is a clear channel frequency, KYNO uses a directional antenna to avoid interfering with Class A stations XEQ in Mexico City and CFNV in Montreal. Even with these restrictions, it can be heard across much of the Western United States at night with a good radio.

== Station history ==
=== KFRE ===
KFRE was first licensed on August 18, 1937, on 1190 kHz. It moved to 890 kHz in 1939 then to 920 kHz in 1941 as a result of the North American Regional Broadcasting Agreement (NARBA). It moved to the current 940 kHz frequency in 1942.

=== KYNO ===
KYNO Fresno signed on in 1948 with 1000 watts on 1300 kHz (White's Radio Log, Fall 1948)

KYNO from 1956 and throughout the 1960s and 1970s, was a Top-40 station, and was the #1 "Hooper" rated station in Fresno under the ownership of Gene Chenault. KYNO was the testing ground for the "Boss Radio" format that would be adopted at major market stations such as KHJ, Los Angeles; KFRC, San Francisco and CKLW, Windsor-Detroit.

Program director Bill Drake and disc jockeys such as K.O. Bailey, Les Turpin, Ed Mitchell, and Gary Mack went against the cross town rival 1340 KMAK (now KCBL), its program director Ron Jacobs and DJs Robert W. Morgan (who would become legendary in Los Angeles), Jim Price, Glenn Adams, Jay Stevens, Frank Terry & Tom Maule. This radio war is now known as the "Battle Of Fresno."

Eventually, KYNO stopped playing music and for a time was an all-sports station that carried the Fresno Grizzlies of the Pacific Coast League. They also broadcast live games of the Fresno Cardinals (a St. Louis Cardinals farm team) up to 1956, and the independent Fresno SunSox (1957). The team became a farm team of the San Francisco Giants in 1958 (Fresno Bee Radio Logs - various)

From 1999 until August 30, 2008, KYNO was a Spanish language Christian music and preaching station, known as Radio Guadalupe.

KYNO changed frequencies from 1300 AM to 940 AM on April 1, 2010, and then changed frequencies from 940 AM to 1430 AM on October 6, 2012.

=== KFIG ===
In 2008, the station was purchased by John Ostlund, owner of FM station KJWL. The new ownership changed to a conservative talk format (one of five such formats in the region) on September 1, 2008, starting with a lineup featuring nationally syndicated talk show hosts, such as Bill O'Reilly, Dennis Miller, Dr. Laura, Don Imus and Larry King Live.

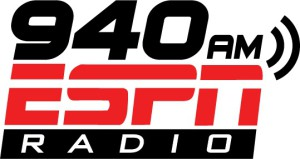
Logo as an ESPN Radio affiliate

On October 6, 2012, KYNO dropped the news talk format to become a full-time sports radio station, as an affiliate of ESPN Radio under new call letters, KFIG. It also broadcast some local sports shows in the afternoon and early evening. KFIG carried both San Francisco Giants and Oakland Athletics baseball games, as well as San Francisco 49ers and Las Vegas Raiders football games.

=== KYNO's comeback ===
On July 19, 2021, KYNO returned to the 940 dial position and began broadcasting oldies music. The KFIG call letters and sports format moved to 1430.
