= KALZ =

Coordinates: 36.6949°N 119.7332°W

- Fowler, California; United States
- Broadcast area: Fresno metropolitan area
- Frequency: 96.7 MHz (HD Radio)
- Branding: PowerTalk 96.7

Programming
- Format: Talk radio
- Affiliations: Fox News Radio; Premiere Networks; Fresno State Bulldogs

Ownership
- Owner: iHeartMedia, Inc.; (iHM Licenses, LLC)
- Sister stations: KBOS-FM, KCBL, KFBT, KFSO-FM, KHGE, KRDU, KRZR, KSOF

History
- First air date: October 6, 1980
- Former call signs: KTED (1980–1986); KEZL (1986–2005)
- Call sign meaning: "Alice" (previous format)

Technical information
- Licensing authority: FCC
- Facility ID: 2097
- Class: B1
- ERP: 25,000 watts
- HAAT: 100 meters (330 ft)
- Repeater: 1400 KRZR (Visalia)

Links
- Public license information: Public file; LMS
- Webcast: Listen live (via iHeartRadio)
- Website: powertalk967.iheart.com

KALZ (96.7 FM) is a commercial radio station licensed to Fowler, California, United States, and serving the Fresno metropolitan area. It airs a talk format and is owned by iHeartMedia, Inc., with studios located on Shaw Avenue in North Fresno near California State Route 41. Programming is simulcast on sister station KRZR (1400 AM) in Visalia.

The transmitter tower is on South Bliss Drive in the Roosevelt neighborhood of Fresno. The station also broadcasts using HD Radio technology.

== History ==
The station signed on the air on October 6, 1980, as KTED. The station was originally owned by Salem Media and aired a Christian talk and teaching format. The studios were on East Kings Canyon Road.

In 1982, the station was bought by Bilmar Communications. The Christian format ended and the station flipped to a beautiful music format. The call sign switched to KEZL in 1986, with the EZ representing Easy Listening music. The KEZL call sign and easy listening format had been heard on 98.9 FM for many years before that station changed to KSOF, airing a soft adult contemporary format. By the 1990s, KEZL made the transition to a smooth jazz format.

The station was acquired by San Antonio-based Clear Channel Communications in 2000. Clear Channel was the forerunner to today's owner, iHeartMedia.

The station was co-owned with "Alice 102.7", which aired a mix of alternative rock and hot adult contemporary music. In 2006, management decided to swap formats and call letters, moving Alice and the KALZ call letters to 96.7, while moving the Smooth Jazz format and KEZL call letters to 102.7.

In 2012, iHeart management decided to take several of its most popular talk shows off Cumulus Media-owned KMJ, including Sean Hannity and Rush Limbaugh, in order to launch their own news/talk station in the Fresno radio market. KALZ flipped to "Power Talk 96.7" on January 1, 2013.

== Programming ==
Trevor Carey and John Girardi host local shows on KALZ-KRZR during afternoon drive; the remainder of the schedule is nationally syndicated programs including The Glenn Beck Program, The Sean Hannity Show, and Coast to Coast AM. KALZ/KRZR also carries Fresno State Bulldogs sports live on the Bulldog Sports Network along with sister station KCBL.

== Previous logo ==
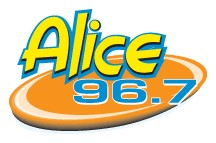
