= KMJ-FM =

News/talk radio station in Fresno, California

Simulcasts KMJ, Fresno
- Fresno, California; United States
- Broadcast area: Fresno metropolitan area; Central California
- Frequency: 105.9 MHz
- Branding: KMJ Now

Programming
- Format: Talk radio
- Affiliations: Fox News Radio; Premiere Networks; Radio America; Westwood One

Ownership
- Owner: Cumulus Media; (Cumulus Licensing LLC)
- Sister stations: KMGV; KMJ; KSKS; KWYE

History
- First air date: December 8, 1979
- Former call signs: KKDJ (1979–1997); KRNC (1997–2004); KKDG (2004–2005); KFJK (2005–2009)

Technical information
- Licensing authority: FCC
- Facility ID: 26933
- Class: B
- ERP: 2,400 watts
- HAAT: 597 meters (1,959 ft)
- Transmitter coordinates: 37°4′22.8″N 119°25′54.4″W

Links
- Public license information: Public file; LMS
- Webcast: Listen live
- Website: kmjnow.com

KMJ-FM (105.9 FM) is a commercial radio station licensed to Fresno, California, United States. Owned by Cumulus Media, it features a talk format simulcasting KMJ (580 AM). KMJ-FM's studios are located at the Radio City building on Shaw Avenue in North Fresno, while the transmitter is sited off Auberry Road in Meadow Lakes, California. The station features a mixture of local hosts and syndicated programs.

== History ==
=== KKDJ ===
The station signed on the air on December 8, 1979. It was owned by Pacific Quadracasting, Inc. It was an album-oriented rock (AOR) station known as "KKDJ 106". The KKDJ call letters were previously used by a rock station in Los Angeles. There was another KMJ-FM between 1949 and the 1980s, at 97.9 MHz. It was the original FM simulcast of 580 KMJ, then switched to classical music and later Top 40, before becoming today's KMGV.

KKDJ was the leading rock station in Fresno throughout the 1980s, largely due to the popularity of KKDJ's morning show, The Dean and Don's Breakfast Club. Dean was also known as Bobby Volare and Don as Donnie Rotten. The Dean and Don's Breakfast Club had an avid following in Fresno during the late 1970s and early 1980s. KKDJ also brought 1980s concert acts such as The Knack, Huey Lewis and the News, The Motels and The Babys to the Star Palace and Warner's Theatre.

In 1980, Dean and Don along with their co-host Jimmy Michaels recruited the KKDJ 106 Cheerleaders, eight women and one man. The applicants had to submit a written essay of why they wanted to become a KKDJ 106 Cheerleader. The hip and sexy 1980s cheer team was recruited to promote concerts and other events, hosted by the Breakfast Club. Some of the team members include; Susan "Sexy Susan " Johnson, Rebecca "Becky Baby" Perryman, Mayer "Mary Maybe" Daher, Julie "Jules" Contreras, with Susan "Sassy Sue" Riley, and Cecelia "Lusty Lolita". Other KKDJ 106 DJs at the station during this time included Jeffrey D. Reidel, Michael "Mike The Wild Kingdom" Wild, with David "Dead Air Dave" Sozinho, and Sue Delany. Dean's weekend show was called Dean Opperman's Off-Ramp to Nowhere.

KKDJ's dominance as a rocker was hurt when 103.7 KMGX changed its format from Top 40 to hard-edged rock in 1989, as KRZR (today KFBT). In 1991, KKDJ changed its format from album rock to alternative rock under the nickname "105.9 The Edge". This format lasted until January 1994.

=== Spanish ballads and hot talk ===
When Henry Broadcasting acquired KKDJ, it was relocated from its studios on Shaw Avenue to a small trailer in the KSKS/KMJ parking lot, a trailer previously used by sister station KDON-FM for live remotes. Henry Broadcasting also changed the format of KKDJ to classic rock, to compete with KJFX. In September 1996, KKDJ's format changed again, this time to Spanish soft ballads as KRNC, "Romance 106". That evolved into a more uptempo Spanish Hits format as "Viva 106".

In July 2004, the station flipped to a hot talk format known as "The Edge", with the call sign KKDG, and featured Howard Stern's syndicated show in the morning. The talk format barely made a dent in the ratings; in February 2005, "Viva 106" was temporarily revived, while still running Howard Stern in morning drive time.

=== Jack FM ===
In September 2005, the format was changed again to adult hits as an affiliate of the Jack FM format, rebranded as "105.9 Jack FM", and changing its call sign to KFJK. Jack FM was among the highest-rated stations in the Fresno market for several years, due to its large playlist, made up of rock, alternative and pop hits from the past and present, as well as its own unique system of playing these songs at random, hence the slogan, "Playing What We Want". In addition, Jack had no DJs, which was heavily promoted. One station announcement said, "You don't hear someone talk in between songs on a CD, so why would you hear someone talk in between songs on the radio?" In response to the success of KFJK, in December 2006, KWYE changed its format, which had previously been Top 40.

=== News/talk KMJ-FM ===
Jack FM's popularity declined by 2009, eventually ranking 15th (out of 38). On March 26, 2009, KFJK changed its format to news/talk, branded as "KMJ Now", in tandem with KMJ 580 AM. On March 27, 2009, KFJK changed its call letters to KMJ-FM. KMJ-FM's switch to talk created the region's fifth such station. At first KMJ-AM and FM shared only some programs, but today the two stations are fully simulcast. The ratings for both stations are combined, so it does not matter whether a listener tunes in 580 or 105.9.

On August 30, 2013, a deal was announced in which Townsquare Media would purchase Peak Broadcasting, and then immediately swap Peak's Fresno stations, including KMJ-AM-FM, to Cumulus Media in exchange for Cumulus' stations in Dubuque, Iowa, and Poughkeepsie, New York. The deal was part of Cumulus' acquisition of Dial Global; Peak, Townsquare, and Dial Global were all controlled by Oaktree Capital Management. The sale to Cumulus was completed on November 14, 2013.

== See also ==
- List of three-letter broadcast call signs in the United States
