= KBOS-FM =

Coordinates: 36.637°N 118.944°W

- Tulare, California; United States
- Broadcast area: Fresno; Visalia; Central Valley
- Frequency: 94.9 MHz (HD Radio)
- Branding: B95

Programming
- Format: Rhythmic contemporary

Ownership
- Owner: iHeartMedia, Inc.; (iHM Licenses, LLC)
- Sister stations: KALZ; KCBL; KFBT; KFSO-FM; KHGE; KRDU; KRZR; KSOF

History
- First air date: September 1, 1965
- Former call signs: KGEN-FM (1965–1967); KBOS (1967–1992)
- Call sign meaning: "Boss Radio"

Technical information
- Licensing authority: FCC
- Facility ID: 9748
- Class: B
- ERP: 16,500 watts
- HAAT: 263 meters (863 ft)

Links
- Public license information: Public file; LMS
- Webcast: Listen live (via iHeartRadio)
- Website: b95forlife.iheart.com

KBOS-FM (94.9 MHz, "B95") is a commercial radio station licensed to Tulare, California, United States, and serving Fresno, Visalia and the Central Valley of California. It airs an urban-leaning rhythmic contemporary format and is owned by iHeartMedia, Inc. Its studios are on East Shaw Avenue in North Fresno.

The transmitter is off Pierce Valley Drive atop Eshom Point in Hanford.

== History ==
=== KGEN-FM and Boss Radio ===
The station signed on the air on September 15, 1965. Its original call sign was KGEN-FM, sister station to KGEN (1370 AM). KGEN and KGEN-FM simulcast a full service format of middle of the road (MOR) and country music with local news and sports. KGEN was a daytimer station, so KGEN-FM could continue airing the stations' programming after sunset when the AM station had to go off the air.

KGEN-FM changed its call letters to KBOS on July 24, 1967. It began broadcasting a Top 40 format, known as "Boss Radio".

The station's first transmitter location was in Tulare, where it was powered at 5,300 watts on a short antenna. It could only be heard in Tulare and adjacent communities. In the 1970s, it moved to the Blue Ridge Mountains along with KJUG-FM 106.7. FM 94.9 had an effective radiated power (ERP) around 1,500 watts with a height above average terrain (HAAT) of 2,650 feet (810 m).

=== Rhythmic contemporary ===
KBOS remained a Top 40 station until the 1980s when it began adding more rhythmic hits and deleting pop-leaning titles. Since then, the station has enjoyed dominant ratings. The station’s transmitter site moved again, this time to Eshom Point. That gave it better coverage in the Fresno radio market, boosting its economic potential. It increased its ERP to its current 16,500 watts. KBOS added the "-FM" suffix, modifying its call sign to KBOS-FM, on February 1, 1992.

KBOS-FM was acquired by Capstar in 2000. (Capstar was a forerunner to current owner iHeartMedia.) KBOS-FM is one of two Rhythmic Top 40 stations covering Fresno, Kings, Madera, and Tulare Counties. The other is KSEQ, licensed to Visalia and owned by Lotus Communications.
