= KUAF =

Public radio station in Fayetteville, Arkansas

- Fayetteville, Arkansas; United States
- Broadcast area: Northwest Arkansas
- Frequency: 91.3 MHz (HD Radio)

Programming
- Format: Public radio (News, Information and Classical music)
- Subchannels: HD2: Classical 24; HD3: Jazz Works
- Affiliations: NPR; American Public Media; Public Radio Exchange; BBC World Service

Ownership
- Owner: University of Arkansas

History
- First air date: January 5, 1973 (53 years ago)
- Call sign meaning: K University of Arkansas Fayetteville

Technical information
- Licensing authority: FCC
- Facility ID: 4307
- Class: C0
- ERP: 100,000 watts
- HAAT: 326 m (1,070 ft)
- Transmitter coordinates: 35°51′12″N 94°1′32″W
- Translator: 88.9 K205AA (Fayetteville)

Links
- Public license information: Public file; LMS
- Webcast: Listen live
- Website: kuaf.com

KUAF (91.3 MHz) is a non-commercial FM radio station licensed to Fayetteville, Arkansas, serving Northwest Arkansas. The station is owned by the University of Arkansas, with studios and offices at the Lynn and Joel Carver Center for Public Radio near the school's campus on South School Avenue in Downtown Fayetteville.

It airs a public radio format, featuring news and informational programming during the day and evening, mostly from National Public Radio (NPR). Programs include Morning Edition, All Things Considered and Fresh Air with Terry Gross. It has a local weekday magazine show, Ozarks At Large, heard at noon and repeated in early evenings. Late nights, KUAF plays classical music with some jazz and blues on Friday and Saturday nights.

KUAF has an effective radiated power (ERP) of 100,000 watts, the maximum permitted for non-grandfathered FM stations. The transmitter is on Skelton Road in Wyola, Arkansas. The signal covers parts of Arkansas, Oklahoma and Missouri. KUAF also serves as the NPR member for Fort Smith, Arkansas.

== History ==
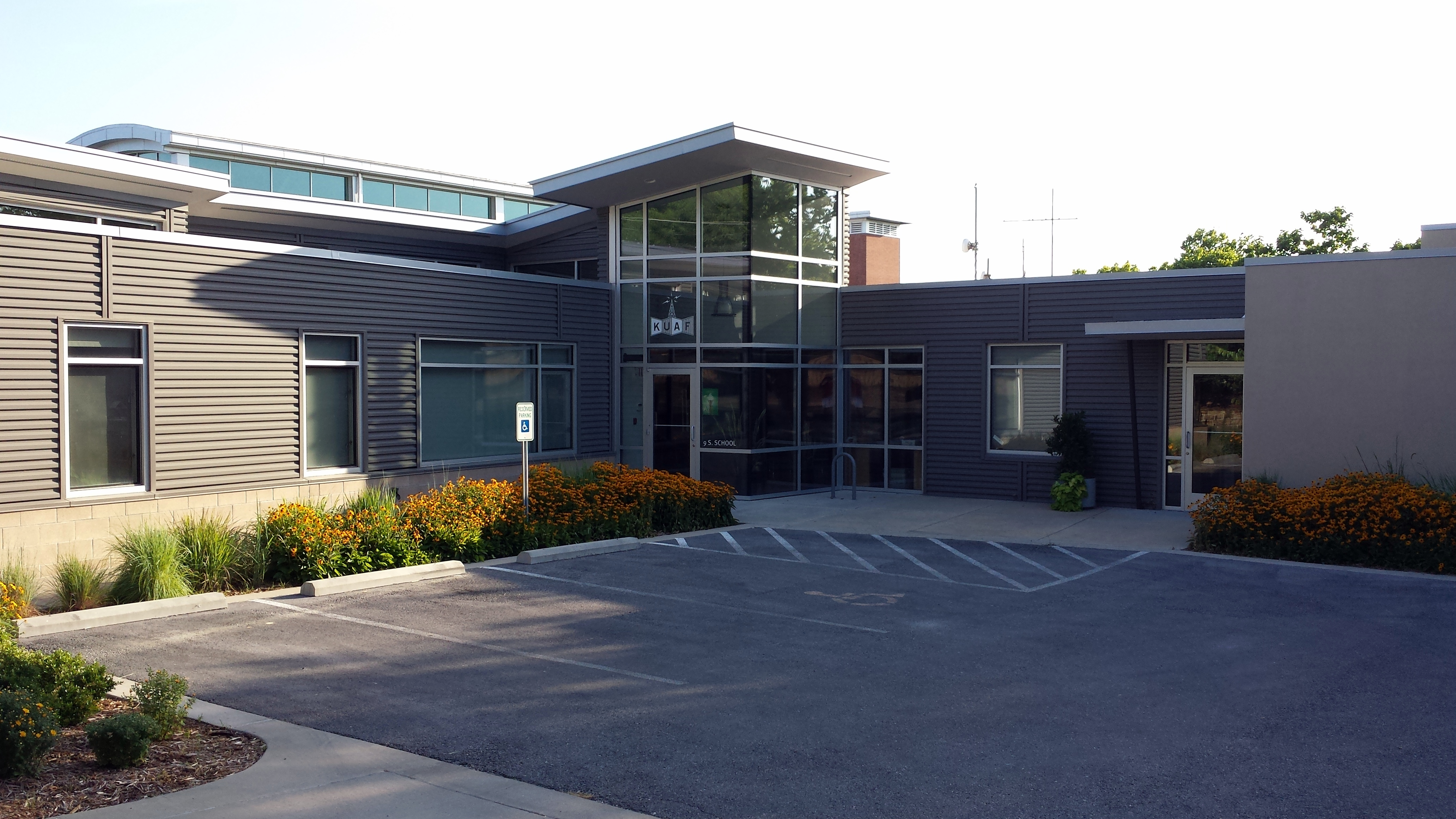
KUAF's studios in Fayetteville

On January 5, 1973, KUAF signed on the air. It was a student-run station using a low-power 10-watt transmitter, originally on 88.9 MHz. The signal could only be heard around the U of A campus and parts of surrounding Fayetteville. The station was supervised by a faculty member in the Department of Journalism. Students studying radio, television, and film were given the opportunity to volunteer for time slots available throughout the week. Aside from some public service programs, students were free to play whatever music was of interest to them. Many listeners referred to the station as "the 10-watt wonder".

In the early 1980s, the university got a construction permit from the Federal Communications Commission (FCC) to increase power to 60,000 watts, and move to 91.3 MHz. It also began transitioning to a more professional operation. KUAF signed on its new, more powerful transmitter in 1985, and became Northwest Arkansas' first NPR member station. KUAF became the first station in its market to sign-on with an HD Radio signal in 2006. That was coupled with an increase to 100,000 watts.

== HD Radio ==
KUAF broadcasts using HD Radio technology. The station has three digital subchannels. KUAF-HD1 repeats the station's regular FM signal. KUAF-HD2 broadcasts around-the-clock classical music from Classical 24. KUAF-HD3 is known as "Jazz Works". It airs continuous jazz music and specialty programs.
