= KSEQ =

Radio station in Fresno, California

Coordinates: 36.636°N 118.943°W

- Visalia, California; United States
- Broadcast area: Fresno; Visalia; Hanford; Tulare
- Frequency: 97.1 MHz
- Branding: Q97-1

Programming
- Format: Rhythmic contemporary
- Affiliations: Compass Media Networks

Ownership
- Owner: Lotus Communications; (Lotus Fresno Corp.)
- Sister stations: KHIT-FM; KKBZ; KLBN

History
- First air date: October 1984

Technical information
- Facility ID: 7717
- Class: B
- ERP: 17,000 watts
- HAAT: 237 meters (778 ft)

Links
- Website: www.q971.com

KSEQ (97.1 FM) is a commercial radio station licensed to Visalia, California, United States, and broadcasting to the Central California communities of Fresno, Hanford and Tulare. KSEQ airs a rhythmic contemporary format branded as Q97-1 (pronounced "Q-Ninety Seven One").

Its studios are on East Olive Avenue, just north of downtown Fresno in the Tower District, and the transmitter is sited on Eshom Point in Hartland.

== History ==
The station signed on the air in October 1984. For part of the 1980s and 1990s, it aired an adult contemporary music format. KSEQ dropped its adult contemporary sound in favor of a Top 40 music format in 1997, later to evolve to rhythmic top 40 in 1998.

KSEQ has been a top station in the Fresno market for much of the 2000s. KSEQ's main competitor is KBOS-FM, which has been the leading rhythmic contemporary station in the market for even longer.

Musically, KSEQ has always shifted and capitalized on the current state of the CHR format each year. In January 2009, KSEQ began separating its playlist from KBOS with pop artists like Lady Gaga, Black Eyed Peas, Beyoncé and Mariah Carey. This musical shift has helped KSEQ maintain its competitive edge.

In May 2012, KSEQ welcomed Big Boy's Neighborhood, a Los Angeles-based syndicated wake-up show, to mornings. It also added market veteran Erik "Danny" Salas to the afternoon drive time.

On September 9, 2013, KSEQ welcomed former KBOS program director Greg Hoffman and comedian Andre Covington (also formerly of KBOS) to the morning show time slot, replacing Big Boy's Neighborhood. The program wa called The Greg and Dre Morning Show.

On March 10, 2014, Buckley Broadcasting announced that it would sell KSEQ to Lotus Communications. The transaction, at a purchase price of $2.4 million, was consummated on July 11, 2014.

In December 2014, KSEQ welcomed DJ Erb, a 12-year veteran at KBOS, who now mixes the "Drive at 5 Mix" and is the current music/imaging Director.

In September 2026, the Greg and Dre show came to an end, with Covington departing the station and Hoffman moving to middays. The station began airing the syndicated Dana Cortez show in morning drive.
