= KSKS =

Coordinates: 37.077°N 119.435°W

- Fresno, California; United States
- Broadcast area: Fresno metropolitan area; Central Valley
- Frequency: 93.7 MHz
- Branding: 93.7 Kiss Country

Programming
- Format: Country
- Affiliations: Westwood One

Ownership
- Owner: Cumulus Media; (Cumulus Licensing LLC)
- Sister stations: KMGV; KMJ; KMJ-FM; KWYE

History
- First air date: 1946
- Former call signs: KRFM (1946–1964); KFRE-FM (1964–1971); KFYE (1971–1991)
- Call sign meaning: "Kiss" (2 times)

Technical information
- Licensing authority: FCC
- Facility ID: 26924
- Class: B
- ERP: 68,000 watts
- HAAT: 580 meters (1,900 ft)

Links
- Public license information: Public file; LMS
- Webcast: Listen live
- Website: www.ksks.com

KSKS (93.7 FM) is a commercial radio station licensed to Fresno, California, United States. The station is owned by Cumulus Media and it airs a country music format branded as "93.7 Kiss Country". Its studios are at the Radio City building on Shaw Avenue in North Fresno and its transmitter is off Auberry Road in Meadow Lakes, California.

As one of the oldest FM stations in the Fresno media market, the station is considered a grandfathered superpower station, as its effective radiated power is 68,000 watts at a height above average terrain of 580 meters (1,900 feet). (Stations at that height in Central California should run less than 3,000 watts, according to current Federal Communications Commission rules for Class B regions; however, KSKS went on the air in 1946, founded before the rules were put in place.)

== History ==
=== KRFM and KFRE-FM ===
The station signed on the air in 1946. KRFM were the original call letters. The first owner was Paul Bartlett, a Fresno radio station pioneer. The station's studios were originally at the transmitter site in Meadow Lakes. In the 1940s and 50s, few people owned FM receivers, so finding an audience was difficult.

The station was acquired by the owner of KFRE (940 AM, now KYNO) and KFRE-TV (now KFSN-TV), which originally operated on VHF channel 12, later UHF channel 30. As a sister station to KFRE and KFRE-TV, the FM station took the call sign KFRE-FM. All three stations were owned by Triangle Publications. Triangle was the publisher of the popular weekly magazine TV Guide. The company decided to sell off its Fresno properties in 1971.

=== KFYE and KSKS ===
Because the stations were sold to separate companies, and the owner of the AM station kept the KFRE call sign, the FM station took new call letters, KFYE. The station was a mostly-instrumental beautiful music outlet. It played quarter-hour sweeps of instrumental cover tunes of popular adult music, Broadway and Hollywood show tunes.

Through the 1980s, the station added more vocals as an easy listening station. In 1992, KFYE completed the transition to an adult contemporary format known as "Y-94." In the 1980s, disc jockey Ray Appleton hosted "Lunchtime at the Oldies" on Y-94. Appleton would go on to become a popular talk show host at KMJ.

In 1991, the station flipped to Rhythmic AC as "93-7 Kiss FM" KSKS. In 1992, it flipped to country music as "Kiss Country." KSKS and KMJ were acquired by CBS Radio in 1998.

=== Changes in ownership ===
In 2006, CBS Radio decided to leave most medium-sized media markets and concentrate on its stations in larger cities. On November 16 of that year, the company announced the sale of KSKS and its other Fresno-area stations to Peak Broadcasting.

On August 30, 2013, a deal was announced in which Townsquare Media would purchase Peak Broadcasting, and then immediately swap Peak's Fresno stations, including KSKS, to Cumulus Media in exchange for Cumulus' stations in Dubuque, Iowa, and Poughkeepsie, New York. The deal was part of Cumulus' acquisition of Dial Global. Peak, Townsquare, and Dial Global were all controlled by Oaktree Capital Management. The sale to Cumulus was completed on November 14, 2013.
