= KLBN =

Radio station in Fresno, California

Coordinates: 37.073°N 119.432°W

- Fresno, California; United States
- Broadcast area: Fresno, California
- Frequency: 101.9 MHz
- Branding: La Buena 101.9

Programming
- Format: Regional Mexican

Ownership
- Owner: Lotus Communications; (Lotus Fresno Corp.)
- Sister stations: KKBZ; KSEQ; KHIT-FM

History
- First air date: 1948
- Former call signs: KARM-FM (1948–1975); KFRY (1975–1988); KOQO-FM (1988–1990); KQPW (1990–1993); KOQO-FM (1993–2008)
- Call sign meaning: La Buena

Technical information
- Licensing authority: FCC
- Facility ID: 29296
- Class: B
- ERP: 2,250 watts
- HAAT: 597 meters (1,959 ft)

Links
- Public license information: Public file; LMS
- Website: www.1019labuena.com

KLBN is a commercial radio station located in Fresno, California, broadcasting on 101.9 FM. KLBN airs a regional Mexican music format branded as "La Buena". Its studios are located just north of downtown Fresno, and the transmitter tower is in Meadow Lakes in the Sierra National Forest.

== History ==
The 101.9 license in Fresno was awarded to KARM (1430 AM), The George Harm Station, on October 3, 1949, after having broadcast since the previous year. KARM-FM remained such and co-owned with KARM through 1975.

When the station was sold to Lake Enterprises, owner of KFRE (940 AM), in 1975, a call letter change to KFRE-FM was also applied for. It would have been the second KFRE-FM, after the previous one was sold in 1971. That station, which had become KFYE, objected to the similarity and had its petition to deny upheld. Ultimately, the station settled on KFRY.

From 1988 to 2008, except for the early 1990s, the station was KOQO (La Super Q). It became KLBN in 2008.
