= KMJ (AM) =

- Fresno, California; United States
- Broadcast area: Central California
- Frequency: 580 kHz
- Branding: KMJ Now

Programming
- Format: News/talk
- Affiliations: Fox News Radio; Premiere Networks; Radio America; Westwood One

Ownership
- Owner: Cumulus Media Inc.; (Cumulus Licensing LLC)
- Sister stations: KMGV; KMJ-FM; KSKS; KWYE

History
- First air date: 1922

Technical information
- Licensing authority: FCC
- Facility ID: 26923
- Class: B
- Power: 50,000 watts
- Transmitter coordinates: 36°39′32.8″N 119°20′50.4″W (main antenna); 36°41′36.8″N 120°3′19.6″W (auxiliary antenna)
- Repeater: 105.9 KMJ-FM (Fresno)

Links
- Public license information: Public file; LMS
- Webcast: Listen live
- Website: www.kmjnow.com

KMJ (580 kHz) is a commercial AM radio station in Fresno, California. It airs a news/talk radio format, and simulcasts with sister station KMJ-FM. Owned by Cumulus Media, the studios and offices are located at the Radio City building on Shaw Avenue in North Fresno.

The transmitter site is in Orange Cove, California, on East American Avenue at Cove Road. While AM 580 is a regional broadcast frequency, the station is powered at 50,000 watts, the highest power for an AM station permitted by the Federal Communications Commission (FCC). To protect other stations on AM 580, KMJ uses a four-tower array directional antenna. The signal covers most of Central California and reaches into the Bay Area, Sacramento and Bakersfield. KMJ is Central California's primary entry point station in the Emergency Alert System. The four towers aimed at an azimuth of 268° sends the signal nicely over Fresno despite the towers being some way away from the city. The towers are some of the tallest in USA at 256M.

== Programming ==
KMJ-AM-FM focus primarily on locally produced talk programming and news on weekdays. Mornings begin with an agricultural news hour, followed by "Fresno's Morning News", a three-hour block of news, sports, traffic and weather. Middays and afternoons feature local talk hosts. Several nationally syndicated programs are carried at night, including Mark Levin, Armstrong & Getty, Red Eye Radio and America in The Morning from Westwood One, a subsidiary of Cumulus Media, the parent company of KMJ-AM-FM.

Weekends feature shows on money, health, real estate, auto repair and dining. Some shows are paid brokered programming. Weekend hosts include Chris Plante, Chad Benson and Ric Edelman. Local newscasters are heard at the beginning of most hours, with Fox News Radio carried at night.

== History ==
=== Early years ===
KMJ is one of the oldest radio stations in the United States. On December 1, 1921, the U.S. Department of Commerce, in charge of radio at the time, adopted a regulation formally establishing a broadcasting station category, which set aside the wavelength of 360 meters (833 kHz) for entertainment broadcasts, and 485 meters (619 kHz) for market and weather reports. On March 23, 1922, the San Joaquin Light and Power Corporation was issued a license with the randomly assigned call letters KMJ, for a new Fresno station operating on the 360 meter "entertainment" wavelength. By coincidence, KMJ had previously been the call sign assigned to a US merchant marine ship, the SS Matoa, in World War I. A few months later the station was also authorized to broadcast weather reports on 485 meters. The lack of available broadcasting frequencies meant that many localities had to allocate time slots between multiple timesharing stations. However, because there were no other area stations, KMJ had unrestricted hours. (Until 1936, and the arrival of KARM, KMJ was the only radio station in Fresno.) KMJ remains one of only a few dozen stations to keep its original three-letter call sign from its founding.

In late 1923, KMJ was reassigned to 1100 kHz, which was changed to 1210 in early 1924, to 1280 kHz a year later, and to 820 kHz in mid-1927. On November 11, 1928, as part of the implementation of a major nationwide reallocation under the provisions of the Federal Radio Commission's General Order 40, KMJ was reassigned to a "local" frequency, 1200 kHz. The next year this was changed to another "local" frequency, 1210 kHz.

In 1925 ownership was changed to The Fresno Bee, which was part of the McClatchy Newspaper Company chain of newspapers.

=== Signal upgrade ===
McClatchy was intent on improving KMJ's coverage, and competed with KTAB in Oakland (now KZAC in San Francisco) for reassignment to 580 kHz, a "regional" frequency, which was being made available by the Federal Radio Commission. Eventually, KMJ was awarded the new channel, and the station moved to 580 kHz, effective July 22, 1932, with a power increase from 100 to 500 watts, with unlimited time. Later, power was boosted to 1,000 watts, using a non-directional antenna from a building rooftop in Downtown Fresno.

=== Network affiliation ===
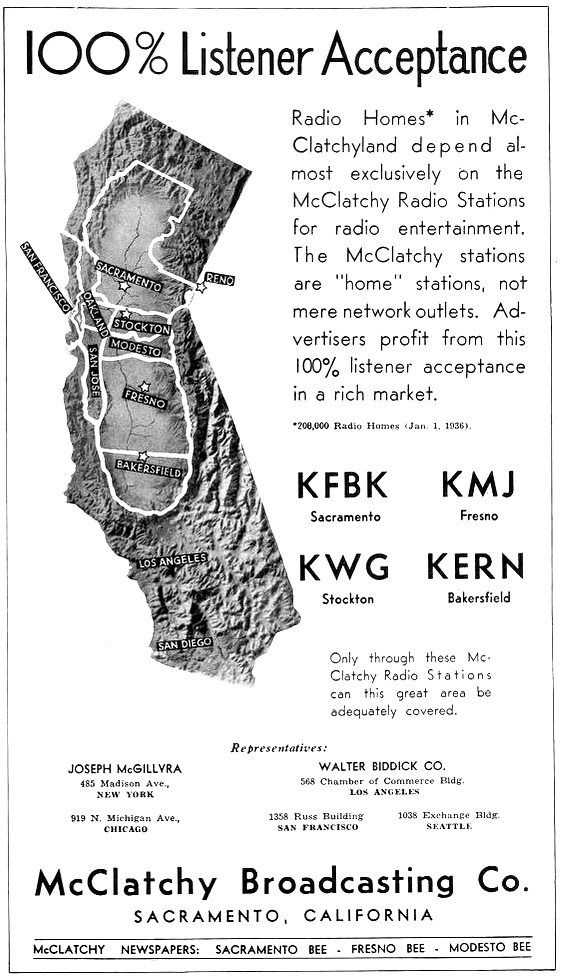
In 1936 KMJ was one of four central California radio stations owned by the McClatchy Broadcasting Company

The station was an affiliate of the Don Lee Network, and also carried CBS Radio Network broadcasts until 1936, when KMJ switched its affiliation to the NBC Red Network. It remained an NBC affiliate until NBC ceased hourly newscasts in the 1990s. KMJ then joined ABC. After CBS was acquired by the Westinghouse Electric Corporation (later renamed CBS Corporation), CBS Radio acquired KMJ from American Radio Systems in 1998. It then began carrying CBS News at the beginning of most hours.

"Modern" studios were constructed as an addition to the Fresno Bee Building on Van Ness Avenue. The studios were subsequently used by Valley Public Radio, and later, McClatchy donated the entire building to the Fresno Metropolitan Museum. The radio studio addition was demolished in 2007, as part of a renovation of the main building.

At the outset of World War II, the Department of War selected KMJ as the primary medium for alerting Central California residents. It is still used for this purpose today as a primary entry point for the Emergency Alert System.

From 1925 until 1987, KMJ was owned by McClatchy, which also owned KFBK in Sacramento, KBEE in Modesto, KERN in Bakersfield, and KOH in Reno. McClatchy Newspapers also owned three daily newspapers in Fresno, Sacramento, and Modesto.

=== FM and TV stations ===
In 1949, KMJ gained a sister station with KMJ-FM 97.9 MHz going on the air. At first, it simulcast KMJ before switching to classical music, and then flipped to an automated Top 40 format in the 1970s. (Currently, the station is KMGV.) In 1953, a television station was added, KMJ-TV on Channel 24. Because KMJ Radio was a longtime NBC affiliate, Channel 24 carried NBC Television Network programming. The TV station was sold off in 1981 to become KSEE.

In November 2006, KMJ and its sister stations KFPT, KWYE, KSKS, KFJK, KOQO and KMGV were sold by CBS Radio to Peak Broadcasting for $90 million.

=== Adding KMJ-FM ===
In March 2009, as more listeners were tuning to FM radio, Peak Broadcasting decided to put KMJ on the FM band. It replaced the Jack FM format and KFJK call letters on 105.9 FM, with talk programming as KMJ-FM. At first, only some programs were shared by both KMJ-AM and FM; currently, all programming is simulcast on both stations.

In the fall of 2012, Premiere Radio Networks, owned by Clear Channel Radio, exercised a termination clause and ended its relationship with KMJ-AM-FM. As of January 1, 2013, all Premiere syndicated shows, including Rush Limbaugh and Sean Hannity, were moved to Clear Channel-controlled stations in the greater Fresno area. KMJ-AM-FM used the opportunity to go with an all live and local line-up of shows from 5 a.m. until 6 p.m., Monday through Friday.

=== Ownership changes ===
On August 30, 2013, a deal was announced in which Townsquare Media would purchase Peak Broadcasting, and then immediately swap Peak's Fresno stations, including KMJ, to Cumulus Media in exchange for Cumulus' stations in Dubuque, Iowa, and Poughkeepsie, New York. The deal was part of Cumulus' acquisition of Dial Global; Peak, Townsquare, and Dial Global were all controlled by Oaktree Capital Management.

The sale to Cumulus was completed on November 14, 2013. Under Cumulus ownership, KMJ-AM-FM became affiliates of co-owned Westwood One News in January 2018. On January 1, 2023, KMJ, which had returned to ABC News Radio, switched to Fox News Radio.

== Transmitter ==
In 1936, the station constructed a 5,000 watt non-directional transmitter site which used a 5 /8 wave antenna located 5 miles east of Fresno at the northeast corner of the Kings Canyon Road and Fowler Avenue intersection.

In 1941, Hammer Field (which later became Fresno Air Terminal) was constructed, as a training base for the Army Air Corps. The KMJ tower was directly in line with the runway, and the Army wanted the site relocated. The transmitter was then moved some 16 miles west of Fresno, to the intersection of Madera and North Avenues in Kerman. The transmitter building was moved to the Kerman site, and the existing tower was unstacked and moved as well; however, it was only 660 feet in height. The remaining 330 feet were stored on the site, with the intention of creating a directional array, although World War II interrupted the project and it never resumed. The extra portion was eventually moved to Sacramento, and used in the construction of the KFBK transmitter site in 1945.

Later, a new directional array was built in Orange Cove, California. However the station retained the single-tower Kerman site. As of 2019 it is not registered as an auxiliary transmit location, so the station must file for an STA if it wishes to transmit from the old tower. This most recently occurred in September 2013 when a Special Temporary Authority (STA) was granted by the FCC that authorized KMJ to use the auxiliary site in Kerman at 5,000 watts, while one of its directional antennas at the 50,000 watt site in Orange Cove were being repaired.

KMJ uses a 50,000 watt transmitter into a directional antenna consisting of four mast radiators situated at 36°39′37.2″ N, 119°20′52.8″ W ; 36°39′29.2″ N, 119°20′52.8″ W ; 36°39′27.9″ N, 119°20′48.3″ W ; and 36°39′36.5″ N, 119°20′47.1″ W ; each of the towers is 840 feet (256.1 meters) tall. Due to its location near the bottom of the AM dial, KMJ's daytime signal decently covers much of the Central Valley, as far north as Sacramento and as far south as Bakersfield. Much of the San Francisco Bay Area gets a city-grade signal.

== See also ==
- List of initial AM-band station grants in the United States
- List of three-letter broadcast call signs in the United States
