= KHIT-FM =

Radio station in Madera–Fresno, California

- Madera, California; United States
- Broadcast area: Fresno, California
- Frequency: 107.1 MHz
- Branding: Exitos 107.1

Programming
- Language: Spanish
- Format: Adult contemporary
- Affiliations: Las Vegas Raiders Spanish Radio Network

Ownership
- Owner: Lotus Communications; (Lotus Fresno Corp.)
- Sister stations: KKBZ; KLBN; KSEQ

History
- First air date: January 9, 1990
- Former call signs: KJDN (1990–92); KMMM (1992–2007); KXOB (2007–09)
- Call sign meaning: "Hit", for its previous format

Technical information
- Licensing authority: FCC
- Facility ID: 51845
- Class: B1
- ERP: 11,000 watts
- HAAT: 153 meters (502 ft)
- Transmitter coordinates: 37°7′39.6″N 119°40′42.1″W

Links
- Public license information: Public file; LMS
- Webcast: Listen live
- Website: www.exitos1071.com

KHIT-FM (107.1 FM) is a radio station airing a Spanish adult contemporary format. Licensed to Madera, California, United States, the station serves the Fresno area. It first began broadcasting in 1990 under the call sign KJDN. The station is currently owned by Lotus Communications. Its studios are located just north of downtown Fresno, and the transmitter tower is near Yosemite Lakes, California.

== History ==
The station went on the air as KJDN on January 9, 1990. On September 14, 1992, the station changed its call sign to KMMM, and again on September 12, 2007, to KXOB, broadcasting a Spanish contemporary format as "107.1 Beso Tu Música Romántica".

On March 1, 2009, at 12:01 am, the station began broadcasting an automated countdown which was set to end on March 3, 2009, at noon. During the countdown, the voice (most likely that of Microsoft Sam) could also be heard repeating lyrics, movie quotes, jokes, etc.

When the countdown ended on March 3, 2009, the station began broadcasting under the callsign KHIT-FM as "107.1 K-Hits" featuring classic hits from the 1960s, 1970s, and some 1980s music.

On December 1, 2010, KHIT-FM began stunting with Spanish Christmas music, and on December 26, flipped to a Spanish adult contemporary format as "Exitos 107.1".
