= KFPT =

Radio station in Clovis, California

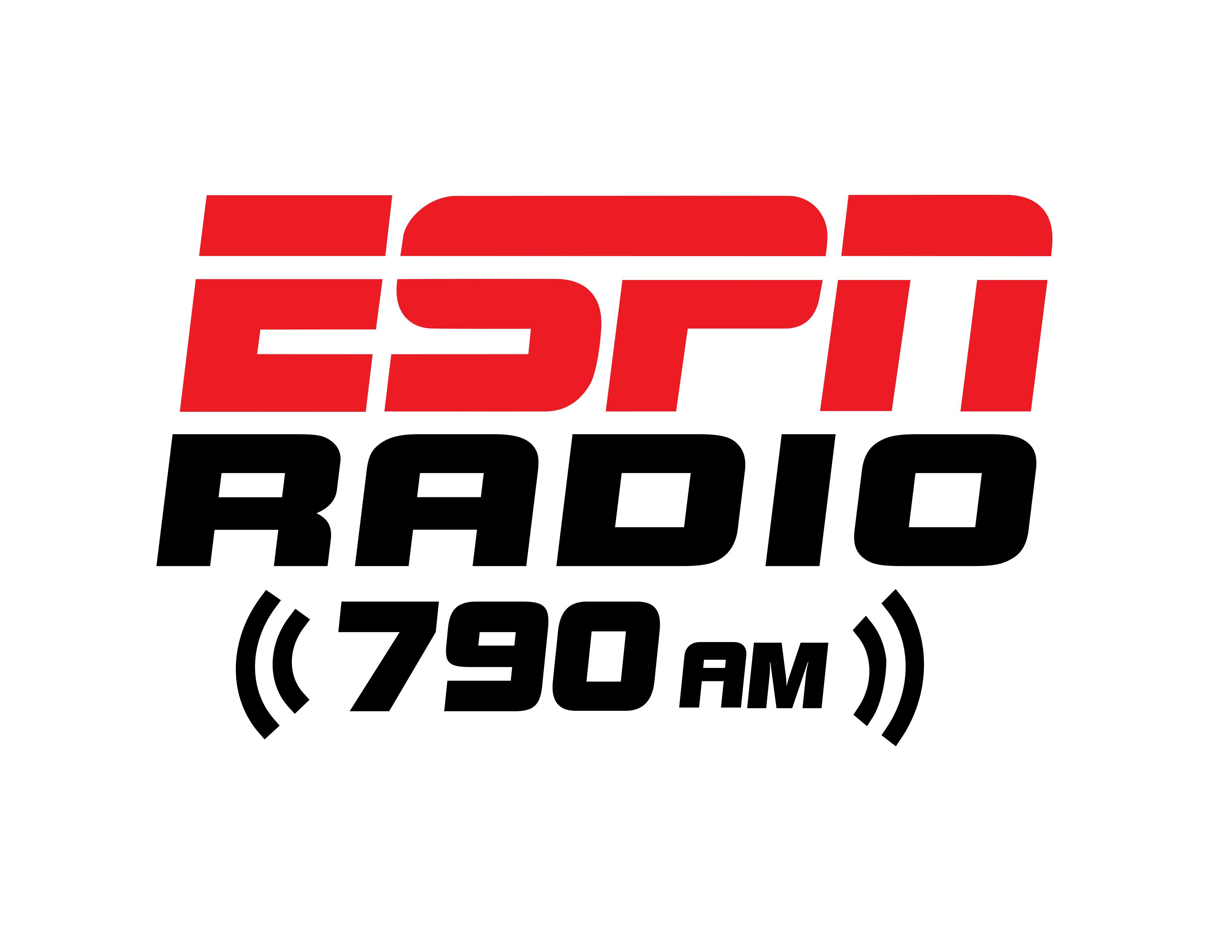
- Clovis, California; United States
- Broadcast area: Metropolitan Fresno
- Frequency: 790 kHz
- Branding: ESPN Radio 790

Programming
- Format: Sports
- Affiliations: ESPN Radio; Los Angeles Lakers; Oakland Athletics; San Francisco 49ers; San Jose Sharks

Ownership
- Owner: Fat Dawgs 7 Broadcasting, LLC
- Sister stations: KFIG

History
- First air date: 1979
- Former call signs: KGPD (1973–1976); KXQR (1976–1984); KXTC (1984–1988); KOQO (1988–1998); KOOR (1998–2005)

Technical information
- Licensing authority: FCC
- Facility ID: 29429
- Class: B
- Power: 5,000 watts (day); 2,500 watts (night)
- Transmitter coordinates: 36°50′38.8″N 119°41′16.5″W

Links
- Public license information: Public file; LMS
- Webcast: Listen live
- Website: 790espnfresno.com

KFPT (790 AM) is a commercial radio station broadcasting a sports format. Licensed to Clovis, California, United States, the station serves metropolitan Fresno. Owned by Fat Dawgs 7 Broadcasting, LLC and features programming from ESPN Radio. KFPT is the sister station to KFIG, Fresno's other ESPN Radio affiliate.

== History ==
The station went on the air as KXQR on 790 kHz in 1979, six years after receiving its construction permit, which in turn was 15 years after the group had first filed for the frequency in 1958. Several ownership changes occurred in the years between receiving the permit and signing on. Beginning in 1985, the station aired beautiful music with the call sign KXTC. The call letters were meant to imply "Ecstasy". The station changed its call sign to KOQO on September 28, 1988.

=== Expanded Band assignment ===
On March 17, 1997, the Federal Communications Commission (FCC) announced that eighty-eight stations had been given permission to move to newly available "Expanded Band" transmitting frequencies, ranging from 1610 to 1700 kHz, with KOQO authorized to move from 790 to 1630 kHz. A construction permit for the expanded band station was assigned the call letters KBEG on May 15, 1998, which were changed to KNAX on February 1, 1999, and to KOME on March 20, 2001. However the expanded band station was never built, and its construction permit was cancelled on January 15, 2004.

=== Later history ===
The station became Spanish-language KOOR in 1998. In July 2005, the call letters were changed to KFPT by Infinity Broadcasting, standing for "Fresno's Progressive Talk"; during this time, KFPT became the market's second-most listened-to AM station.

In February 2007, KFPT was purchased by Peak Broadcasting from CBS Radio as part of a deal involving other stations including KMJ. It was then sold to Fat Dawgs 7 Broadcasting. The sale included a non-compete clause to protect Peak's conservative talk station, KMJ. On April 2, 2007, KFPT changed its format from progressive talk to sports, with programming from ESPN Radio.
