= KFIG =

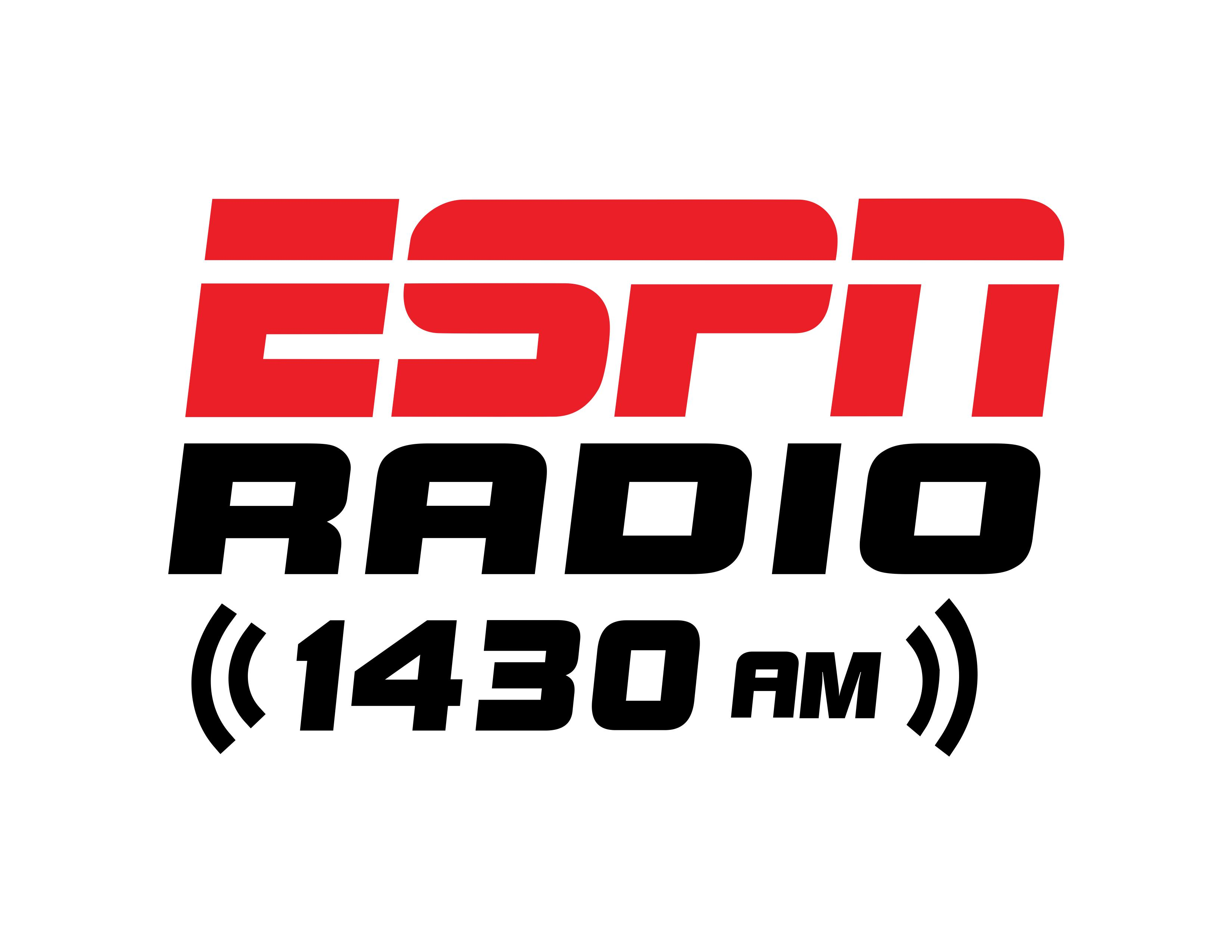
- Fresno, California; United States
- Broadcast area: Metropolitan Fresno
- Frequency: 1430 kHz
- Branding: ESPN Radio 1430

Programming
- Format: Sports
- Affiliations: ESPN Radio

Ownership
- Owner: Fat Dawgs 7 Broadcasting, LLC
- Sister stations: KFPT

History
- First air date: 1938
- Former call signs: KARM (1938–1988); KFIG (1988–1992); KWDO (1992); KFIG (1992–2012); KYNO (2012–2021)
- Call sign meaning: Figs

Technical information
- Licensing authority: FCC
- Facility ID: 26592
- Class: B
- Power: 5,000 watts
- Transmitter coordinates: 36°53′26.8″N 119°39′33.5″W

Links
- Public license information: Public file; LMS
- Webcast: Listen live
- Website: www.1430espnfresno.com

KFIG (1430 AM, "ESPN Radio 1430") is a commercial radio station licensed to Fresno, California, United States, airing a sports format. It is owned by Fat Dawgs 7 Broadcasting, with studios on North Palm Avenue at West Barstow Avenue in Fresno. KFIG's transmitter is sited on North Carson Avenue near East Copper Avenue in Clovis.

== History ==
The history of two Fresno area radio stations, KFIG and KYNO, is heavily intertwined, as follows:

KYNO began broadcasting early in 1948. It originally broadcast on 1300 kHz with 1,000 watts full-time (cf. White's Radio Log, Spring 1948).

KYNO 1300 AM increased to 5,000 watts days, and 1,000 watts nights in the early 1960s (cf. White's Radio Log). Throughout the 1960s and 1970s, it was a Top 40 station, and was #1 "Hooper" rated in the Fresno radio ratings. It was owned by Eugene Chenault. KYNO was the testing ground for the "Boss Radio" format that would be adopted at such stations as KHJ in Los Angeles; KFRC in San Francisco and CKLW in Windsor-Detroit.

In 1957, the Fresno AM dial consisted of KMJ (NBC) 580, KBIF 900, KFRE (CBS) 940, KEAP 980, KYNO (MBS) 1300, KMAK 1340, KARM (ABC) 1430, and KGST 1600 (cf. Fresno Bee Radio Log). KMAK was 1340 from 1953 to 1988 then KKAM from 1988 to 1992. KARM was 1430 and KFRE was 940. KFIG was an FM station first on 94.5 then moved to 101.1 in the early 1970s.

The first station in the area to operate on 1430 kHz was KARM, in 1938. The call letters were derived from the ownership (George and Hattie Harm). For a long span in the 50's and 60's, it was the ABC (American Broadcasting Company) affiliate in the area. Along with KMJ-FM and KRFM (KFRE) it operated KARM-FM as one of the first three FM stations in Fresno. (cf. White's Radio Log and Fresno Bee radio logs, various editions).

KARM 1430 was changed to KFIG 1430, KYNO swapped frequencies with 940 becoming 940 KYNO then swapped calls with KFIG 1430 in October 2012 when John Ostland acquired KFIG from Fat Dawgs. On July 19, 2021, KYNO and its oldies format returned to 940 and the KFIG call letters and sports format returned to 1430 under the Fat Dawgs' ownership.

== Programming ==
KFIG is an affiliate of ESPN Radio. On weekdays, programs include The Rich Eisen Show, SportsLine: The Bulldog Hour with Tony D, Behind the Bench with Phil Benotti, and The Central Valley Sports Report with Paul Meadors.

Local live play-by-play sports includes CIF Central Section high school football, basketball & baseball games. KFIG also carries San Francisco Giants baseball, San Francisco 49ers and Los Angeles Rams football as well as select games from the Fresno Grizzlies baseball team and the NBA, NHL, NCAA football and basketball from Westwood One and ESPN.
