= 94.1 FM =

FM radio frequency

The following radio stations broadcast on FM frequency 94.1 MHz:

== Argentina ==
- LRM730 Sendas de vida in Gálvez, Santa Fe
- LRS312 in San Carlos Centro, Santa Fe
- Milenium Rosario in Rosario, Santa Fe
- Radio María in Pampa del Indio, Chaco
- Radio María in Morteros, Córdoba
- Radio María in Concepción del Uruguay, Entre Ríos

== Australia ==
- 2IAM in Coffs Harbour, New South Wales
- Ninefourone FM in South Coast, New South Wales
- Today's Country 94one in Gosford, New South Wales
- Radio National in Launceston, Tasmania
- 3WBC in Melbourne, Victoria
- ABC Western Victoria in Hamilton, Victoria
- Triple J in Bunbury, Western Australia

== Belize ==
- Faith FM

== Brunei ==
- Harmoni (subsidiary of Radio Television Brunei)

== Canada (Channel 231) ==
- CBK-1-FM in Saskatoon, Saskatchewan
- CBKJ-FM in Pinehouse Lake, Saskatchewan
- CBL-FM in Toronto, Ontario
- CBNV-FM in Placentia, Newfoundland and Labrador
- CBYK-FM in Kamloops, British Columbia
- CBYR-FM in Rock Creek, British Columbia
- CFGW-FM in Yorkton, Saskatchewan
- CHOX-FM-1 in Baie St-Paul, Quebec
- CHSJ-FM in Saint John, New Brunswick
- CIAM-FM-3 in Watt Mountain, Alberta
- CICU-FM in Eskasoni, Nova Scotia
- CIMG-FM in Swift Current, Saskatchewan
- CJAQ-FM-1 in Banff, Alberta
- CJIK-FM in Sheshatshiu, Newfoundland and Labrador
- CJOC-FM in Lethbridge, Alberta
- CJUV-FM in Lacombe, Alberta
- CJVA-FM in Caraquet, New Brunswick
- CKBA-FM in Athabasca, Alberta
- CKCN-FM in Sept-Iles, Quebec
- CKCV-FM in Creston, British Columbia
- CKEC-FM in New Glasgow, Nova Scotia
- CKNR-FM in Elliot Lake, Ontario
- CKZM-FM in St. Thomas, Ontario
- VF2288 in Hagensborg, British Columbia
- VF2289 in Carol Lake Mining, Newfoundland and Labrador
- VF2399 in Masset, British Columbia
- VF2434 in Aupaluk, Quebec
- VF2435 in Quaqtaq, Quebec
- VF2436 in Kangiqsujuaq, Quebec
- VF2437 in Kangirsuk, Quebec
- VF2438 in Kuujjuarapik, Quebec
- VF2439 in Kuujjuaq, Quebec
- VF2440 in Umiujaq, Quebec
- VF2441 in Inukjuak, Quebec
- VF2442 in Puvirgnituk, Quebec
- VF2443 in Kangiqsualujjuaq, Quebec
- VF2444 in Tasiujaq, Quebec
- VF2445 in Akulivik, Quebec
- VF2446 in Salluit, Quebec
- VF2447 in Ivujivik, Quebec
- VF2475 in Fraser Lake, British Columbia
- VF2532 in Hope, British Columbia
- VF8010 in La Tuque, Quebec

== China ==
- CNR Business Radio in Guilin
- CNR China Traffic Radio in Jinan
- CNR Music Radio in Tengchong
- CNR The Voice of China in Shanwei

== Guatemala (Channel 16) ==
- "La Marca 94 FM" at Guatemala City

== Japan ==
- Tochigi Broadcasting in Tochigi

== Mexico ==
- XET-FM in Monterrey, Nuevo León
- XHCCCT-FM in Mérida, Yucatán
- XHCSAB-FM in Acapulco, Guerrero
- XHEDO-FM in Puerto Escondido, Oaxaca
- XHEMOS-FM in Los Mochis, Sinaloa
- XHFCSM-FM in Cuernavaca, Morelos
- XHGNB-FM in Guerrero Negro, Baja California Sur
- XHGT-FM in Zamora, Michoacán
- XHHES-FM in Chihuahua, Chihuahua
- XHHGR-FM in Villahermosa, Tabasco
- XHHV-FM in Boca del Río, Veracruz
- XHIND-FM in Tlanchinol, Hidalgo
- XHJE-FM in Puebla, Puebla
- XHPNAS-FM in Navolato, Sinaloa
- XHRASA-FM in San Luis Potosí, San Luis Potosí
- XHTLN-FM in Nuevo Laredo, Tamaulipas
- XHUAD-FM in Durango, Durango
- XHUAM-FM in Mexico City

== Nigeria ==
- Wazobia FM 94.1 in Port Harcourt, Rivers State

== Philippines ==
- DWMN in Tuguegarao, Cagayan
- DWVN in Vigan, Ilocos Sur
- DWSR in Daet, Carmarines Norte
- DYKA in San Jose, Antique
- DYLC in Catarman, Northern Samar
- DXLN in Pagadian, Zamboanga del Sur
- DXKW in Tulunan, North Cotabato
- DXZZ in Dipolog, Zamboanga del Norte
- DXKE in Surigao City, Surigao del Norte
- DXUR in Marawi City, Lanao del Sur
- DXNH in Bongao, Tawi-Tawi
- DYVL in Bogo City, Cebu

== United States (Channel 231) ==
- KACD-LP in Midland, Texas
- KBIH-LP in Houston, Texas
- KBJZ-LP in Juneau, Alaska
- KBKY in Merced, California
- KBXL in Caldwell, Idaho
- KCLK in Clarkston, Washington
- KCTB-LP in Lonepine, Montana
- KDJJ in Fernley, Nevada
- KDLK-FM in Del Rio, Texas
- KDNS in Downs, Kansas
- KEGR-LP in Wasilla, Alaska
- KEMB-LP in Emmetsburg, Iowa
- KEZZ in Phippsburg, Colorado
- KFKF in Kansas City, Kansas
- KFML in Little Falls, Minnesota
- KFXM-LP in Cherry Valley, California
- KGOD-LP in Tenaha, Texas
- KHRA-LP in Anchorage, Alaska
- KIDC-LP in Odessa, Texas
- KIND-LP in Oxnard, California
- KISV in Bakersfield, California
- KJAZ in Point Comfort, Texas
- KJDB-LP in Sierra Vista, Arizona
- KKLN in Atwater, Minnesota
- KKPT in Little Rock, Arkansas
- KKXK in Montrose, Colorado
- KLGE in Hydesville, California
- KLMM in Morro Bay, California
- KLNO in Fort Worth, Texas
- KLTR in Brenham, Texas
- KMXB in Henderson, Nevada
- KMXJ in Amarillo, Texas
- KMYI in San Diego, California
- KNBS in Bowling Green, Missouri
- KNCO-FM in Grass Valley, California
- KNEB-FM in Scottsbluff, Nebraska
- KOAU-LP in Round Rock, Texas
- KODJ in Salt Lake City, Utah
- KOOZ in Myrtle Point, Oregon
- KOPR in Butte, Montana
- KOYS-LP in Bellingham, Washington
- KPFA in Berkeley, California
- KQCH in Omaha, Nebraska
- KQXY in Beaumont, Texas
- KRDE in Globe, Arizona
- KRKX in Billings, Montana
- KRLQ in Hodge, Louisiana
- KRNA in Iowa City, Iowa
- KSDN in Aberdeen, South Dakota
- KSVB-LP in Big Bear City, California
- KSWD (FM) in Seattle, Washington
- KTFM in Floresville, Texas
- KTHM in Waynoka, Oklahoma
- KTRF-FM in Red Lake Falls, Minnesota
- KTRG in Hooks, Texas
- KVVO-LP in Abilene, Texas
- KXIX in Bend, Oregon
- KXLP in Eagle Lake, Minnesota
- KXOJ-FM in Glenpool, Oklahoma
- KYJJ in Boardman, Oregon
- KZCD in Lawton, Oklahoma
- KZOR in Hobbs, New Mexico
- KZRR in Albuquerque, New Mexico
- WAKU in Crawfordville, Florida
- WAXS in Oak Hill, West Virginia
- WEMX in Kentwood, Louisiana
- WFFH in Smyrna, Tennessee
- WFNU-LP in St. Paul, Minnesota
- WFTN in Franklin, New Hampshire
- WGFA-FM in Watseka, Illinois
- WGFJ in Cross Hill, South Carolina
- WHBC in Canton, Ohio
- WHJY in Providence, Rhode Island
- WHRP in Gurley, Alabama
- WHST in Piegon, Michigan
- WIAL in Elk Mound, Wisconsin
- WIHR-LP in Jamestown, New York
- WIP-FM in Philadelphia, Pennsylvania
- WJHH-LP in Rice, Virginia
- WJJO in Watertown, Wisconsin
- WLLD in Lakeland, Florida
- WLYE in Glasgow, Kentucky
- WLZK in Paris, Tennessee
- WLZT in Worthington, Indiana
- WMEZ in Pensacola, Florida
- WMIX-FM in Mount Vernon, Illinois
- WMLE in Germantown, Tennessee
- WMXK in Morristown, Tennessee
- WNBU in Oriental, North Carolina
- WNNF in Cincinnati, Ohio
- WNOD in Mayaguez, Puerto Rico
- WOTT in Calcium, New York
- WQBT in Savannah, Georgia
- WQKX in Sunbury, Pennsylvania
- WQZK in Keyser, West Virginia
- WRNP in Roanoke, Indiana
- WRZE in Kingstree, South Carolina
- WSOS in Fruit Cove, Florida
- WSTR (FM) in Smyrna, Georgia
- WTPS-LP in Napoleon, Ohio
- WTYS in Marianna, Florida
- WUPK in Marquette, Michigan
- WVSP-FM in Yorktown, Virginia
- WWDK in Jackson, Michigan
- WWKR in Hart, Michigan
- WWLV in Lexington, North Carolina
- WWOX in Milan, New Hampshire
- WXBJ-LP in Salisbury, Massachusetts
- WXLJ in Whitehall, New York
- WYAD-LP in Yazoo City, Mississippi
- WZBQ in Carrollton, Alabama
- WZNE in Brighton, New York

== Venezuela ==
- FM Center in Caracas, CD
