= 2024 Valley View tornado =

2024 EF3 tornado in Texas, U.S.

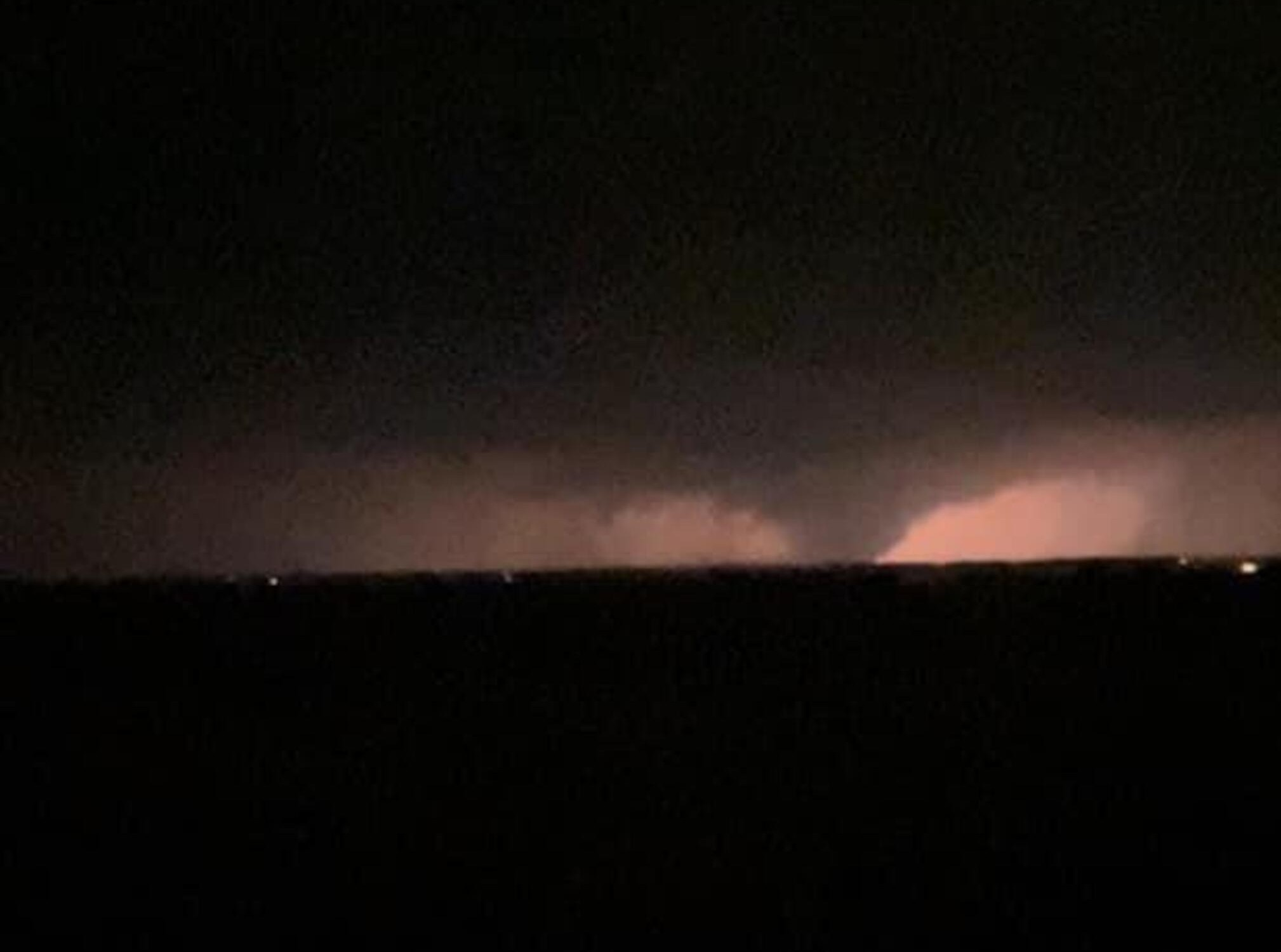
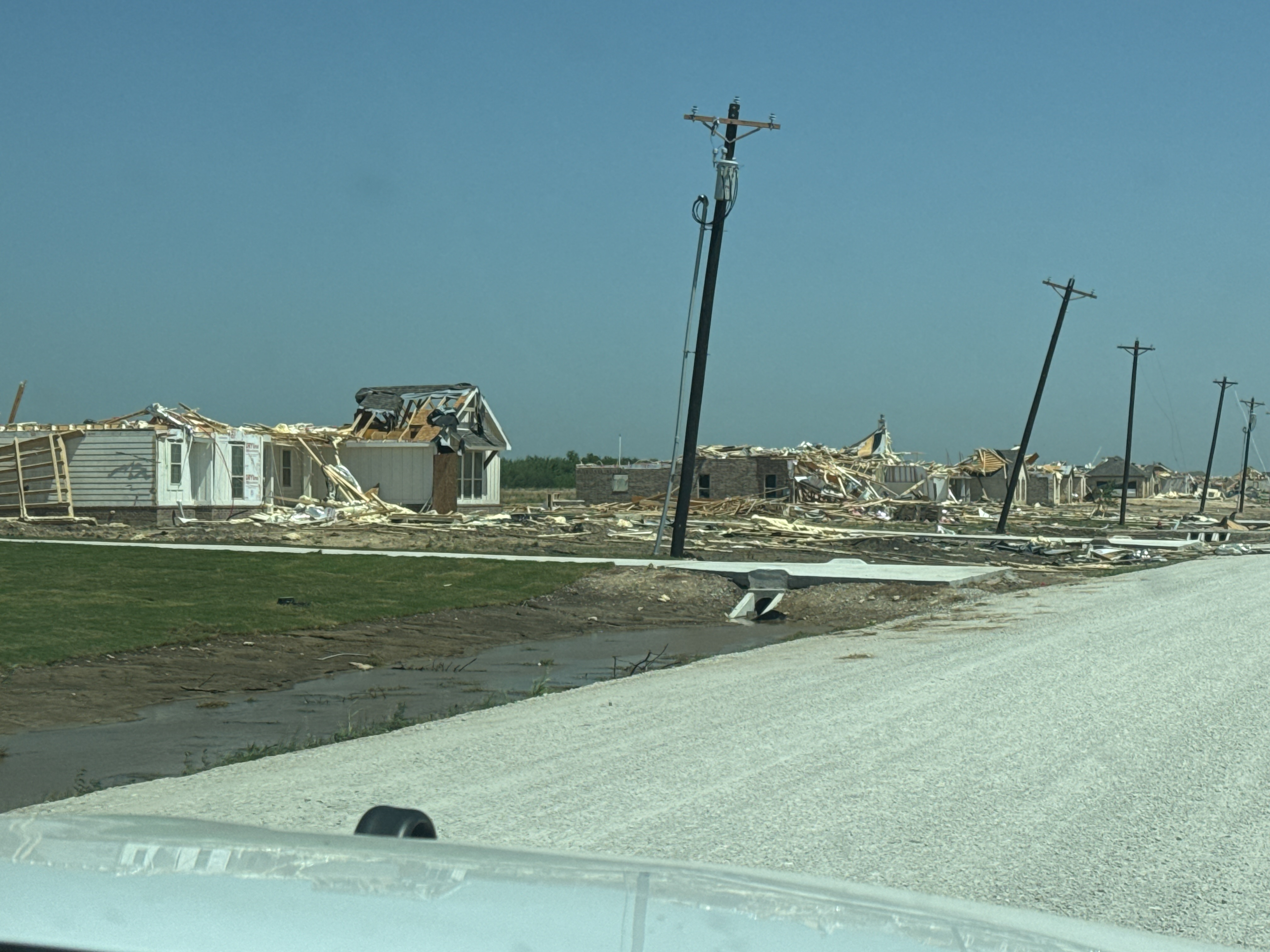
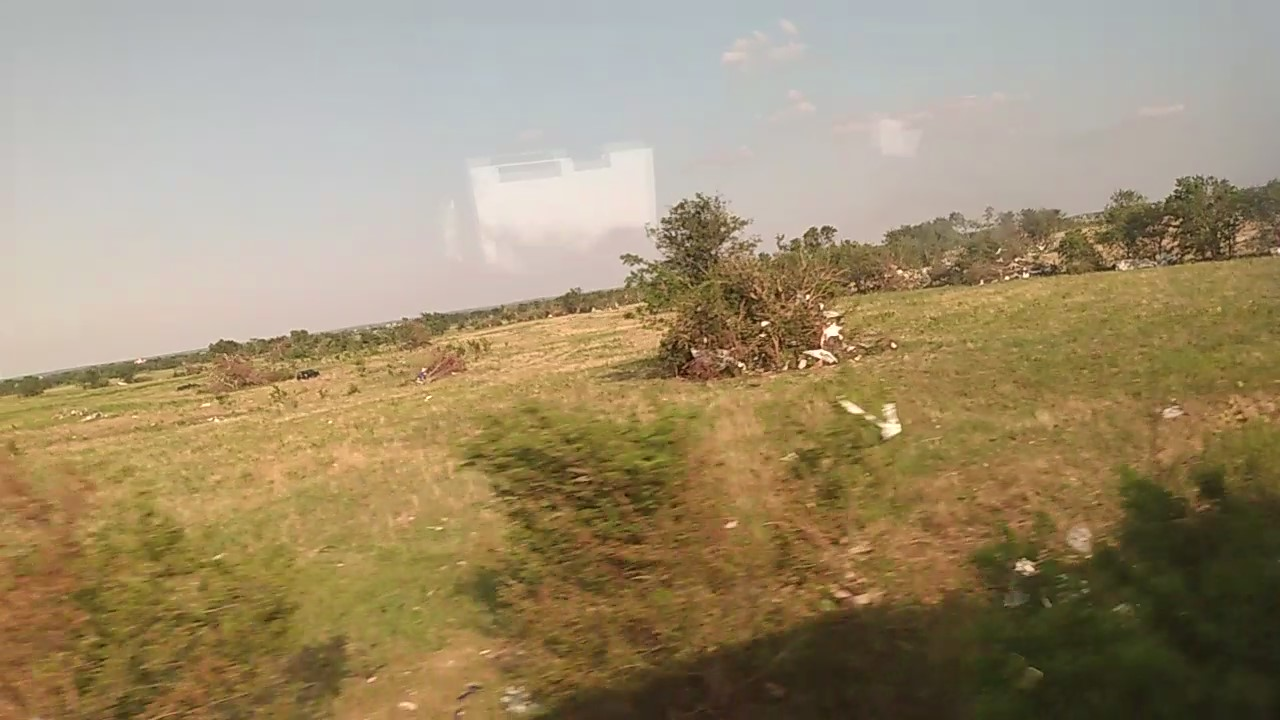
- Clockwise from top: The tornado illuminated by lightning near Sanger; debris strewn through fields south of Valley View after the tornado; low-end EF3 damage to multiple newly constructed suburban homes near Valley View.

Meteorological history
- Formed: May 25, 2024, 9:41 p.m. CDT (UTC−05:00)
- Dissipated: May 25, 2024, 11:15 p.m. CDT (UTC−05:00)
- Duration: 1 hour, 34 minutes

EF3 tornado
- on the Enhanced Fujita scale
- Max width: 3,000 yards (1.7 mi; 2.7 km)
- Path length: 48.25 miles (77.65 km)
- Highest winds: 140 mph (230 km/h)

Overall effects
- Fatalities: 7
- Injuries: 100
- Damage: $19.18 million (2024 USD)
- Areas affected: Montague, Cooke and Denton Counties; specifically around Forestburg, Prairie Point, Rosston, Era, Valley View, and Pilot Point, Texas, United States.
- Part of the Tornado outbreak of May 25–27, 2024 and Tornadoes of 2024

On the night of May 25, 2024, an extremely large, long tracked, and intense EF3 tornado moved through multiple towns across Montague, Cooke, and Denton counties in U.S. state of Texas, most notably near the city of Valley View. It was one of the ten intense tornadoes that occurred during a large tornado outbreak in late May. The tornado remained on the ground for 1 hour and 34 minutes, traveled 48.25 miles (77.65 km), and caused seven fatalities as well as 100 injuries, becoming the deadliest tornado in the state of Texas since a violent tornado occurred nearly 9 years prior. It also caused $19.18 million in damages.

The supercell thunderstorm responsible for this tornado first formed earlier in the day around 8:30 p.m. CDT (20:30 UTC) over Bowie, Texas where it would move east-southeast across Montague County and southern Cooke County intensifying further. Eventually, the tornado touched down at 9:41 p.m. CDT (21:41 UTC) just east of the Aries Caddo Oil Field, where it produced EF0-EF1 damage to nearby trees before intensifying to EF2 intensity, destroying or damaging 2 different homes near Forestburg. As the tornado approached the Montague-Cooke county line, it briefly weakened to EF1 intensity before re-intensifying south of Era. The tornado inflicted its most intense damage near Valley View, destroying several newly constructed homes at low-end EF3 intensity as well as destroying a nearby gas station at EF2 intensity. Shortly after crossing into Denton County, the tornado began to rapidly weaken producing EF0-EF1 damage northwest of Pilot Point before dissipating at 11:15 p.m. CDT (UTC 23:15).

== Meteorological synopsis ==
=== Setup & forecast ===
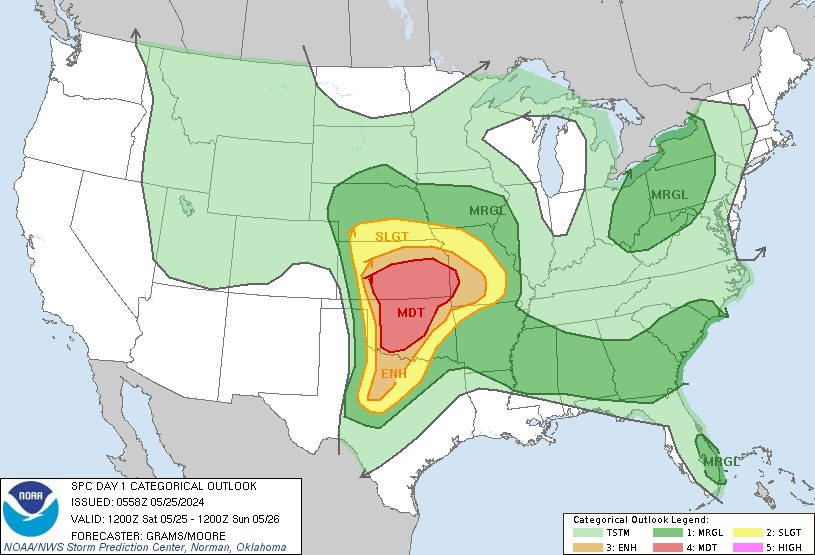
The Storm Prediction Center's Day 1 convective outlook for May 25, 2024, issued at 1200Z, indicating a moderate risk for severe weather over much of Kansas, Oklahoma, and portions southwestern Missouri as well as an enhanced risk covering much of northern Texas.

On May 25, 2024, the SPC warned of an outbreak of severe thunderstorms across a level 4/5 Moderate risk area that encompassed much of Oklahoma and Kansas, as well as southwestern Missouri. In this region, forecasters expected the development of a few discrete supercells that would be capable of producing giant hail and strong to violent tornadoes. Across the northern portion of the risk, these supercells were forecast to evolve into a mesoscale convective system with swaths of damaging winds into the overnight hours. The potential for a level 5/5 High risk was discussed by forecasters in the preceding 24 hours given "a rare combination of instability and shear" that was depicted by model guidance. However, multiple uncertainties precluded a categorical upgrade, particularly questions about the influence of storms in Texas on the risk area farther north. A broad upper-level trough existed over the Western United States, with several embedded shortwaves, one of which was expected to translate across the risk area during the afternoon. A stationary boundary lifted northward as a warm front while a dryline sharpened from western Kansas into western Texas. In the warm sector between these boundaries, dewpoints rose into the upper 60s to even mid-70s °F, aiding in the development of extreme mixed-layer instability of 4,000–5,000 J/kg. A particularly dangerous situation tornado watch was subsequently issued for portions of extreme northern Texas, much of Oklahoma, and south-central Kansas.

=== Supercell formation & storm development ===
Radar imagery of the tornadic supercell that was producing the Valley View tornado as it moved eastward after passing south of Valley View.

Later that day, additional supercells evolved across northern Oklahoma and southern Kansas, but those underwent negative interaction with left-split storms and their accompanying outflow approaching from the south. As a result, central Oklahoma was completely void of storms for the entire day. However just before midnight, an extremely unstable air mass developed across North Texas ahead of a high-amplitude upper-level trough. Atmospheric sounding data from the National Weather Service (NWS) Fort Worth recorded surface-based Convective Available Potential Energy (CAPE) exceeding 5,000 J/kg, signaling extreme instability. Concurrently, strong deep-layer wind shear of approximately 80 knots was present, characterized by significant low-level veering from southeasterly surface winds to westerly flow aloft. These parameters were highly conducive to the formation of discrete, long-lived supercells capable of producing significant tornadoes.

The Valley View tornado itself was spawned by a long-tracked supercell that initiated southwest of Bowie around 8:30 p.m. CDT (20:30 UTC). As the storm moved east-southeast across Montague County and southern Cooke County, it developed an intense mesocyclone with high-end rotational signatures, before the tornado formed at 9:41 p.m. CDT (21:42 UTC).

== Tornado summary ==
=== Formation near Forestburg ===
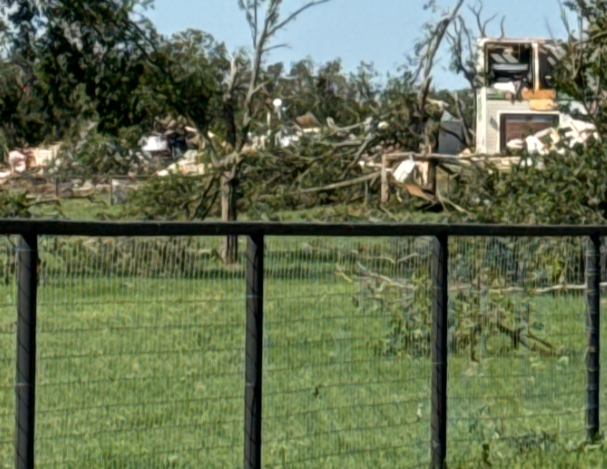
Low-end EF2 damage to a home south of Dry Valley near Forestburg.

At 9:41 p.m. CDT (21:41 UTC), the tornado touched down just west of the Aries Caddo Oil Field and almost immediately impacted a manufactured home on Body Road, severely damaging its roof at EF0 intensity. Afterwards, the tornado damaged multiple trees near Roth Road at EF0-EF1 intensity. The tornado then approached a small barn completely destroying it at high-end EF1 intensity. Afterwards, the tornado tracked south of Posey Brewer Road just south of Dry Valley damaging multiple trees at EF0-EF1 intensity before impacting a family home and an outbuilding ripping off its roof and destroying the outbuilding at EF2 intensity. The tornado would then weaken continuing to damage trees between EF0-EF1 intensity across rural Montague County south of Forestburg, before destroying another outbuilding at EF1 intensity along Greenwood Lane. The tornado also impacted another home at EF1 intensity on Stedham Road. The tornado would continue to damage multiple outbuildings and trees between EF0-EF1 intensity before crossing into Cooke County.

=== Prairie Point, Rosston, and Era ===
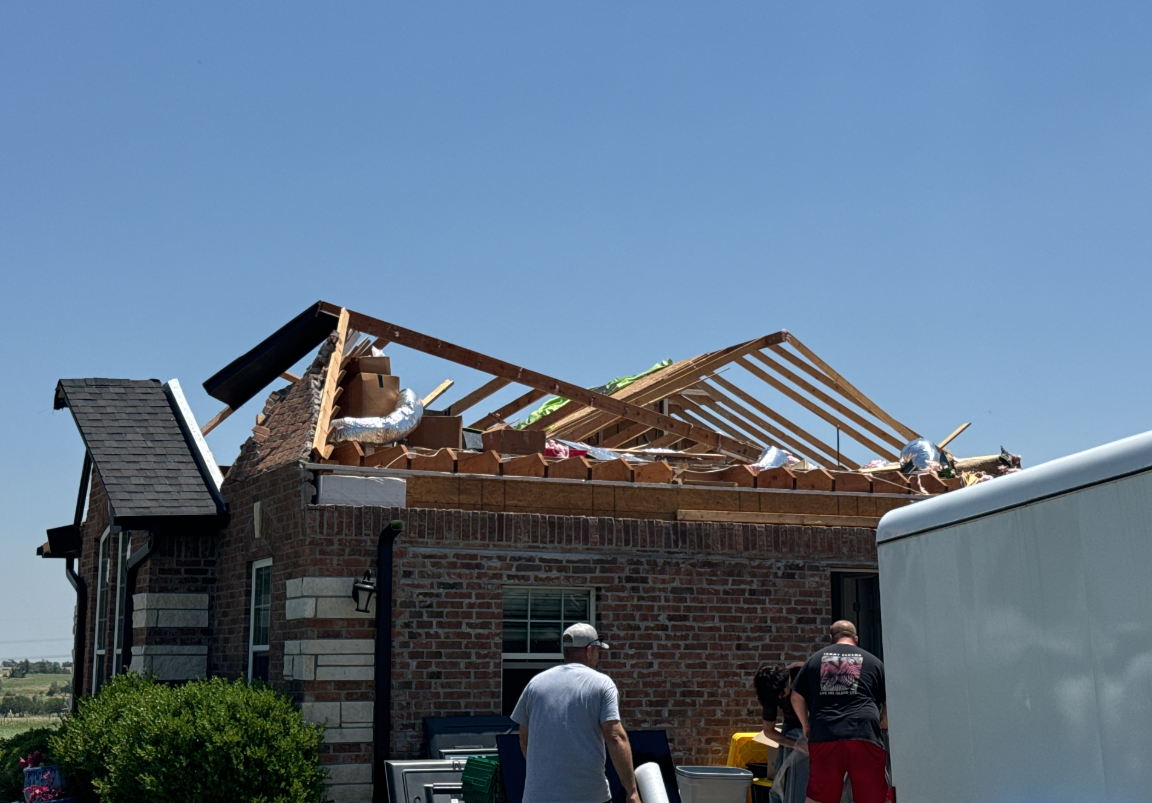
EF2 damage to a home along County Road 365 south of Era.

Immediately after crossing into Cooke County, the tornado weakened and struck Prairie Point, uprooting multiple trees at EF0-EF1 intensity before impacting two homes along County Road 362 at EF0 intensity damaging several roof shingles. Afterwards, the tornado would track into Rosston, slightly damaging trees at EF0 intensity before overturning an outbuilding on County Road 373. North of Leo, the tornado would intensify to EF1 intensity completely destroying an outbuilding. Now south of Era, the tornado continued to intensify destroying two outbuildings near County Road 151 at EF1 intensity before approaching a row of homes along County Road 365, significantly damaging two homes at EF1 intensity and another at EF2 intensity. The tornado would continue to cause severe damage along County Road 366 destroying multiple outbuildings and impacting another home at low-end EF2 intensity removing most of its roof before destroying more outbuildings nearby. Afterwards, the tornado continued to track across rural areas before impacting two manufactured homes along County Road 321 at EF1 intensity. The tornado was now directly west of Valley View.

=== Peak intensity near Valley View ===
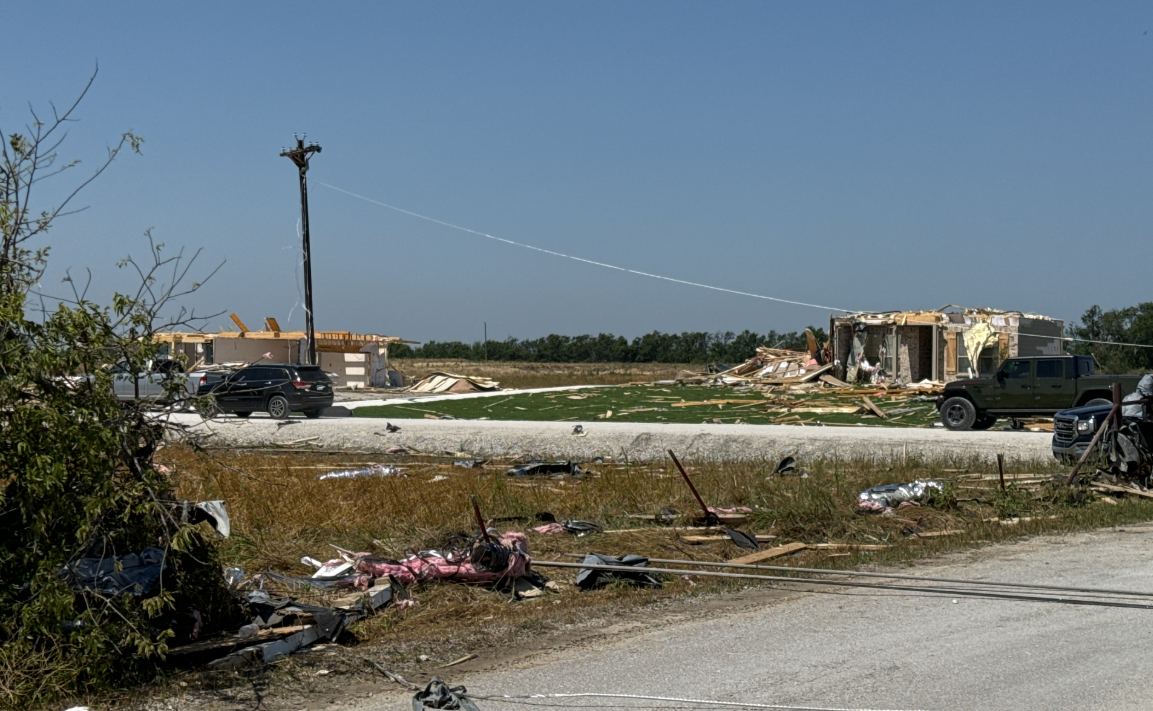
Low-end EF3 damage to a row of newly constructed homes on County Road 200 south of Valley View.

The tornado would continue to damage multiple trees across rural farmland at EF0 intensity before striking the community of Lois, damaging multiple homes at EF1 intensity along County Road 336 before continuing east. Now 3 miles south of Valley View, the tornado continued to intensify damaging two homes at low-end EF2 intensity and destroying outbuildings along County Road 247. As the tornado crossed County Road 200, four more homes would be damaged including the total destruction of a small barn at EF2 intensity. Further traveling along County Road 200, a row of homes was directly impacted, eight homes would be damaged at high-end EF2 intensity before six newly constructed homes at low-end EF3 intensity with maximum winds of 140 mph (230 km/h). All seven fatalities from the tornado would also occur here. Weakening slightly, the tornado would strike the FRF Estates, maintaining EF2 intensity. Along County Road 2133 and 2131, multiple homes would be damaged at EF1-EF2 intensity. Another home along Green Meadow Drive would completely lose its roof at EF2 intensity. Along West Oak Road, two more homes would be damaged at mid-range EF2 intensity, before the tornado left the FRF estates.

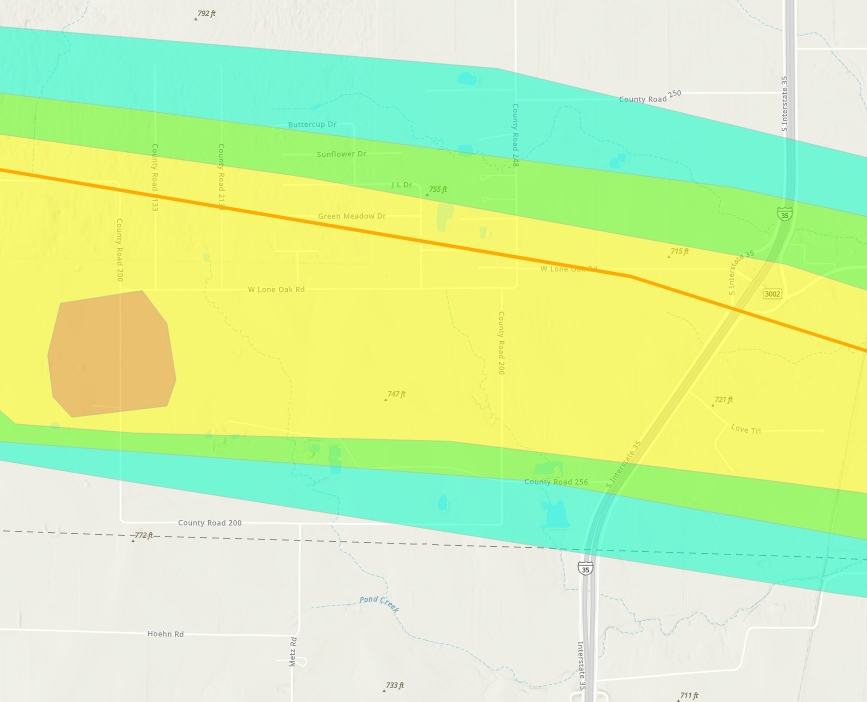
Track and intensity map of the tornado at peak intensity near Valley View. Key EF0 65–85 mph EF1 86–110 mph EF2 111–135 mph EF3 136–165 mph

After leaving the FRF estates, the tornado impacted County Road 200 again completely destroying two mobile homes and heavily damaging two other residences at EF2 intensity. The tornado weakened briefly after crossing County Road 256, damaging trees at EF1 intensity before re-intensifying. As the tornado crossed I-35, two buildings would be destroyed at EF2 intensity. The tornado also severely damaged a gas station at high-end EF2 intensity, where over 100 people were sheltering inside. Shortly after, the tornado also impacted the Love Tri subdivision just west of I-35 damaging 4 homes at EF2 intensity before continuing east.

=== Pilot Point and dissipation ===
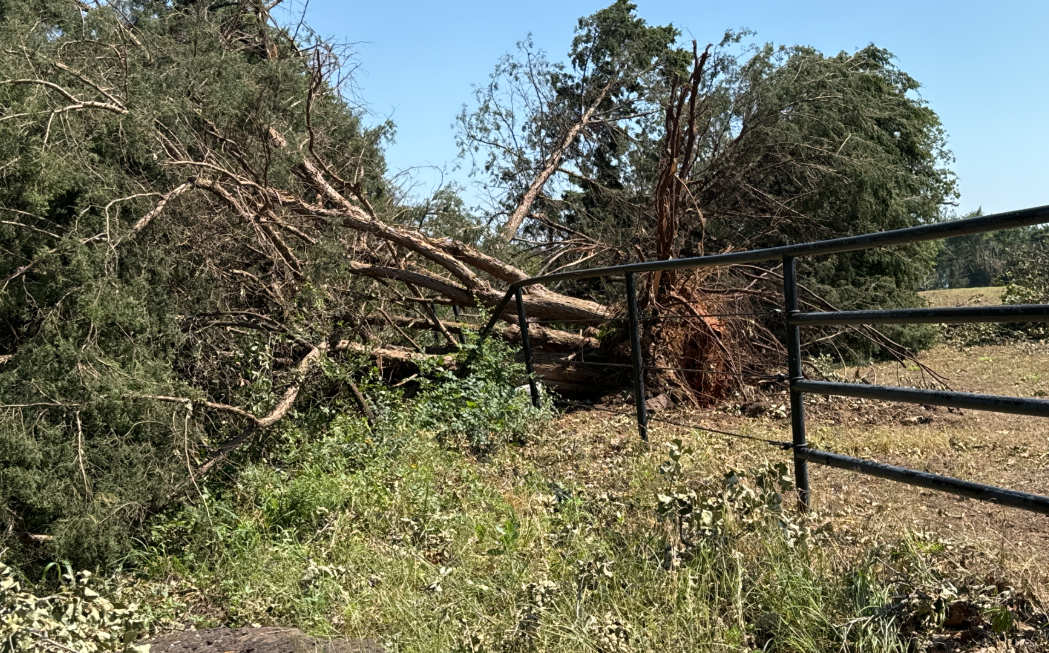
High-end EF1 damage to multiple uprooted trees on Alexander Road west of Pilot Point.

Maintaining EF2 intensity, the tornado continued to move east toward County Road 241, striking a poorly anchored home at high-end EF2 intensity causing its exterior walls to collapse and snapping trees. The tornado continued to move across the street damaging a metal building system and completely destroying a barn at EF2 intensity. Afterwards, the tornado approached Chisam road damaging multiple homes at EF1 intensity and a three separate homes at EF2 intensity. Shortly before crossing Lake Ray Roberts, the tornado also damaged one more home at EF2 intensity along Good Ol Boy Road before briefly crossing the lake. Upon making landfall, the tornado continued to uproot trees and damage homes between EF0-EF1 intensity before entering the ghost town of Hemming causing high-end EF1 damage to multiple homes in the area. The tornado then entered the Johnson Branch Unit of the Ray Roberts Lake State Park, continuing to snap trees at EF0 intensity before crossing into Denton County and crossing Lake Ray Roberts again. Once making landfall, the tornado crossed Lantana Road damaging a home at EF1 intensity before occluding to the northeast. The tornado crossed Alexander Road uprooting multiple trees and impacting one more home at EF1 intensity before the tornado finally lifted just west of Pilot Point at 11:15 p.m. CDT (23:15 UTC).

== Aftermath ==
=== Damage ===
Along its track, the tornado had damaged, severely damaged, or destroyed roughly 200 homes across its lifespan, including multiple that had either had lost portions of or all of their walls between EF2-EF3 intensity. Shortly after formation, just south of Dry Valley, the tornado impacted two structures destroying an outbuilding and removing the roof off a home at EF2 intensity. The tornado also uprooted multiple small trees near Prairie Point while crossing the county line at EF1 intensity. South of Era, the tornado severely damaged two homes at EF2 intensity along County Road 366 and County Road 365. As the tornado entered areas south of Valley View, it directly struck the FRF estates damaging or destroying roughly thirty homes at EF2 intensity along West Lone Oak Road, as well as destroying a row of six homes along County Road 200 collapsing the walls of three homes and heavily damaging three more at 140 mph (230 km/h). All seven fatalities from the tornado also occurred at this location. After leaving the FRF estates, the tornado crossed I-35 and impacted a row of homes destroying two homes and heavily damaging a gas station at EF2 intensity. The tornado also impacted another 10 homes on Chisam road at low-end EF2 intensity before crossing Lake Ray Roberts. The tornado crossed Alexander Road, directly west of Pilot Point, damaging four more homes at EF1 intensity before dissipating shortly after.

In total, the tornado inflicted severe damage across Montague, Cooke, and Denton counties inflicting $19.18 million in damages.

=== Recovery efforts ===
In the hours following the tornado, search and rescue operations began, with first responders and individuals rescuing several individuals from the FRF estates along West Lone Oak Road, where all seven fatalities from the tornado were soon confirmed, of which four were children. 100 more injuries were also confirmed over the next few days after the tornado. Up to a week after the tornado, it was reported that roughly 38,000 residents had lost power county-wide, and 23 were killed. 200 homes had been damaged or destroyed by the tornado alone.

Just days after the tornado had occurred, volunteers from the American Red Cross and locals had already began donating to the John Fortenberry Community Center in Valley View, mainly food items and medical supplies. Local farms would also apply to appeal to volunteers for assistance and debris removal along Green Medow Drive after the tornado.

The American Red Cross soon began opening multiple shelters for those affected by the tornado, most notably Balch Springs Senior Center and Rowlett Community Center. Excluding relief efforts, the American Red Cross also encouraged residents to help with the town's recovery efforts up to months after the tornado had occurred in July 2024.

Later in April 2026, the Cooke County Emergency Management and Fire Marshal's Office announced that the Texas General Land Office had introduced a refurbishment outreach for those that were impacted by the tornado and other severe storms that occurred on May 24, 2024. The office noted those who were seeking refurbishment could visit the local community center in Valley View.

=== Siren controversy ===
As the tornado struck south of Valley View, the towns single tornado siren, which had been installed in the 1950s and was manually powered failed to go off due to faulty wiring. This was due to recent renovations to the town's city hall, which the siren was connected to. It was reported by the fire station that when the siren's button was activated, it had failed to work. Despite accusations of negligence by some, the chief of the volunteer fire department in Valley View noted that the tornado had tracked 3 miles south of the town, so the sirens would not have been heard.

=== Casualties ===
In total, seven people were killed by the tornado, all of which on County Road 200 near the FRF Estates.

List of tornado victims
Name	Age	Location
Victor Ortiz	72	Valley View area
Laura Esparza	49	Valley View area
Miranda Esparza	15	Valley View area
Marco Esparza	9	Valley View area
Loyd Watson	57	Valley View area
Essence McCrary	2	Valley View area
Tyrique McCrary	5	Valley View area

== See also ==
- Tornado outbreak sequence of May 19–27, 2024
- Tornado outbreak of May 25–27, 2024
- List of F3, EF3, and IF3 tornadoes (2020–present)
- Tornadoes of 2024
- Greenfield tornado - A fatal EF4 tornado that also occurred during the same outbreak sequence.
- 2015 Garland tornado - A fatal EF4 tornado that also occurred in Texas 9 years earlier.
