= Forestburg =

Forestburg may refer to:

== Canada ==
- Forestburg, Alberta, a village
  - Forestburg Airport

== United States ==
- Forestburgh, New York, a town
- Forestburg, South Dakota, an unincorporated town and census-designated place
- Forestburg, Texas, an unincorporated community
  - Forestburg Independent School District
  - Forestburg High School
