= Rosston, Texas =

- Unincorporated community
- Location within the state of Texas Rosston (the United States)
- Coordinates: 33°29′00″N 97°26′32″W
- Country: United States
- State: Texas
- County: Cooke

Population (2000)
  - Total: 75
- Time zone: UTC-6 (Central (CST))
  - Summer (DST): UTC-5 (CDT)
- ZIP code: 76263
- Area code: 940

Rosston is a small farming and ranching community in southwestern Cooke County, Texas, United States. According to the Handbook of Texas, the community had a population of 75 in 2000. It is located within the Dallas-Fort Worth Metroplex.

== History ==
By January 5, 1865, Settlers arrived in the area. During a raid, over 100 Indians from Indian Territory killed nine people and took numerous horses. It was said to be the last Indian raid in Cooke County. The four Ross brothers—William, John, Perry, and Orr—moved from Grayson County to the area in 1870 and established a mill, mercantile store, and cotton gin. In 1872, the town's name was changed from Rosstown to Rosston, and a post office was opened in the Ross shop. While traveling between Gainesville and Jacksboro, the Butterfield Overland Mail passed close to Rosston. The Chisholm Trail was also close by. The village peaked in 1913, with seven enterprises (two blacksmith shops, three general stores, a drugstore, and a cotton gin) and a doctor. Sam Bass, an outlaw, is said to have used the Rosston area as a meeting place for gang activity; as a result, the town commemorates Sam Bass Day every year on the third Saturday in July. There were many homes, a store, a volunteer fire station, a Methodist church, a Baptist church, and 110 people living in Rosston in 1980. 110 people were living there in 1990. By 2000, the population had fallen to 75.

On April 20, 1912, an F3 tornado struck Rosston. 12 barns and homes were destroyed. On May 25, 2024, an F0 tornado struck Rosston, causing widespread damage to trees.

The late Bill Freeman of Rosston trained and showed Smart Little Lena, a quarter horse, throughout his career.

On October 12, 1921, Rosston had a branch of the Cooke County Library in its vicinity.

== Geography ==
Rosston is located on Farm to Market Road 922, 20 mi (32 km) southwest of Gainesville, 9 mi (14 km) east of Forestburg, and 9 mi (14 km) west of Era in southwestern Cooke County.

== Education ==
Today, Rosston is served by the Era Independent School District.

== Media ==
The Liberman Broadcasting Tower Era is located just east of the community. The tower is named for its proximity to the community of Era, though it is much closer to Rosston and Leo. The radio transmitters for KZZA, KTCK-FM, and KBOC are also located in the community.

== Notable people ==
- Ralph C. Dills, who served in the California State Assembly.
