= KACD =

KACD may refer to:

- KACD-LP, a low-power radio station (94.1 FM) licensed to serve Midland, Texas, United States
- KDLD, a radio station (103.1 FM) licensed to serve Santa Monica, California, United States, which held the call signs KACD from 1994 to 2000 and KACD-FM from 2000 to 2001
- KIIS (defunct), a defunct radio station (850 AM) formerly licensed to serve Thousand Oaks, California, which held the call sign KACD from 2000 to 2001 and 2001 to 2003
