= KKDL =

KKDL may refer to:

- KKDL (FM), a radio station (93.7 FM) licensed to serve Dilley, Texas, United States
- KZZA, a radio station (106.7 FM) licensed to serve Muenster, Texas, which held the call sign KKDL from 2002 to 2005
