= Era High School =

Location
- 108 Hargrove Ln; Era, Texas 76238-0098; United States; 33.4964°N 97.2918°W

Information
- School type: Public high school
- School district: Era Independent School District
- Principal: Brian Johnson
- Teaching staff: 40.24 (FTE)
- Grades: PK-12
- Enrollment: 509 (2023-2024)
- Student to teacher ratio: 12.65
- Colors: Black & Gold
- Athletics conference: UIL Class A
- Mascot: Hornet
- Yearbook: The Hornet
- Website: Era School website

Era High School or Era School is a public high school located in unincorporated Era, Texas (USA). It is part of the Era Independent School District located in southwest Cooke County and classified as a 2A school by the UIL. In 2015, the school was rated "Met Standard" by the Texas Education Agency.

== Athletics ==
The Era Hornets compete in the following sports:

- Baseball
- Basketball
- Cross Country
- Football
- Golf
- Softball
- Tennis
- Track and Field
- Cheerleading

=== State titles ===
- Boys Track
  - 1914(B)
  - 2016(2A)
