= KEGR =

KEGR may refer to:

- KEGR-LP, a low-power radio station (94.1 FM) licensed to serve Wasilla, Alaska, United States
- KLFG, a radio station (89.5 FM) licensed to serve Fort Dodge, Iowa, United States, which held the call sign KEGR from 2002 to 2013
