= KDLD =

Radio station in Santa Monica/Newport Beach, California, United States

KDLD and KDLE

KDLD: Santa Monica, California; KDLE: Newport Beach, California; United States
- Broadcast area: Los Angeles County; Orange County
- Frequencies: KDLD: 103.1 MHz (HD Radio); KDLE: 103.1 MHz (HD Radio)
- Branding: Reyna 103.1

Programming
- Language(s): Spanish / English
- Format: Latin pop; adult contemporary music

Ownership
- Owner: Entravision Communications; (Entravision Holdings, LLC)

History
- First air date: KDLD: December 22, 1960; KDLE: January 8, 1962
- Former call signs: KDLD: KSRF (1960–1992); KAJZ (1992–1994); KACD (1994–2000); KACD-FM (2000–2001); KSSC (2001–2003); KDLE: KNBB (1962–1964); KOCM (1964–1992); KBJZ (1992–1994); KBCD (1994–2001); KSSD (2001–2003)
- Call sign meaning: Artifact of "KDL: The Dance Leader" branding taken from the former KKDL in Dallas

Technical information
- Licensing authority: FCC
- Facility ID: KDLD: 33902; KDLE: 33904
- Class: KDLD: A; KDLE: A
- ERP: KDLD: 3,700 watts; KDLE: 300 watts
- HAAT: KDLD: 82 meters (269 ft); KDLE: 294 meters (965 ft)
- Transmitter coordinates: KDLD: 34.0149°N 118.3814°W

Links
- Public license information: KDLD: Public file; LMS; KDLE: Public file; LMS
- Webcast: Listen live
- Website: Reyna 103.1 Online

KDLD is a commercial FM radio station in Santa Monica, California, broadcasting to the Greater Los Angeles area on 103.1 MHz. KDLE is a commercial FM radio station in Newport Beach, California, broadcasting to the Orange County area on 103.1 MHz.

KDLD and KDLE simulcast a Spanish Adult Contemporary music format branded as "Reyna 103.1FM" on their analog and main HD Radio signals. The two stations' studios are located in Burbank. The KDLD transmitter is located in Baldwin Hills, while KDLE's transmitter is based in Newport Coast, California.

== History ==
Prior to 1991, the 103.1 frequencies in Los Angeles and Orange County operated as two separate stations, KSRF in Santa Monica and KOCM in Newport Beach.

=== KSRF in Santa Monica ===
KSRF began broadcasting on December 22, 1960, and was the area's first easy listening formatted FM station. The station was branded "K-Surf". It was located in the lobby of King Neptune's Kingdom at Pacific Ocean Park, and featured brightly hued plastic panels, illuminated by changing lights. It was almost entirely automated, utilizing advanced technology for the era. In addition to easy listening music, the station broadcast stock market and weather reports.

Originally owned by the Santa Monica Broadcasting Company, owned by J.D. and C.D. Funk, the station was sold in 1962 to Pacific Ocean Broadcasting, which was a subsidiary of Pacific Ocean Park, for $49,183. In 1965, the station was sold to the Santa Monica Broadcasting Company for $135,000, with controlling interest owned by George Baron, who had been general manager of KSRF since its founding. The station's studio was moved out of Pacific Ocean Park in 1969, and in 1971 its transmitter was moved to the Lawrence Welk Plaza building in Santa Monica. In 1985, KSRF dropped its beautiful music format, and adopted a soft adult contemporary format. Radio Broadcasters, Inc., acquired KSRF in 1986 for $5,250,000.

(The KSRF call letters are now assigned to a Contemporary Hawaiian and Reggae station in Poipu, Hawaii.)

=== KOCM in Newport Beach ===
103.1 MHz in Newport Beach was issued its construction permit in 1958, as KAJS, named for its owner, Arnold J. Stone. Stone sold the station to Western Enterprises Limited for $2,500 the following year. In 1960, KAJS was sold to Newport-Costa Mesa Broadcasting for $3,000, and its call sign was changed to KNBB the following year. The station began broadcasting on January 8, 1962.

Success Broadcasting acquired KNBB for $34,750 in 1964 and changed its call letters to KOCM (later said to stand for "Orange County Music") on January 28 of that year. KOCM aired an easy listening format. In 1979, Hutton Broadcasting purchased the station for $2 million. In 1981, the station was sold to Donrey Media Group for $2 million. In 1986, the station began to play more vocals and fewer instrumentals, and shifted to a soft AC format. When Donrey opted to focus on its newspapers and sell its six radio stations in 1986, the station was sold to Financial Capital Broadcasting Co. of Miami for $2.95 million.

(Since 2007, the KNBB calls have been assigned to a sports-formatted station in Dubach, Louisiana.)

=== Mars-FM ===
In 1991, Ken Roberts, former owner of KROQ-FM, bought KSRF and KOCM for $17.8 million and immediately expressed his desire to convert the two stations, which interfered with each other, into a simulcast. Former KROQ engineer Frank Martin installed new transmitters and the TFT "Reciter" synchronization system to accomplish the simulcast. Stan Salek at Hammett and Edison of San Francisco published a paper at the 1992 National Association of Broadcasters convention on the case study for synchronization of KSRF and KOCM.

On May 24, 1991, the two stations began simulcasting a techno-rock format as "Mars-FM". Club DJ Swedish Egil left KROQ-FM to join the new Mars-FM as music director, along with fellow KROQ alum Freddy Snakeskin, who became Mars-FM's program director. On-air personalities at "Mars-FM" included "Big" Ron O'Brien, Raechel Donahue, Don Bolles, Rob Francis, Holly Adams, Tony Largo, Christian B, Mike Fright (Mike Ivankay) and Dave Alexander. On August 19, 1992, Mars-FM's format was changed and the entire air-staff was let go.

=== Jazz FM ===
On September 7, 1992, the 103.1 simulcast became a jazz station as "Jazz FM 103.1" using the call letters KAJZ/KBJZ. Air-staff included Dave Fennoy, Brooke Jones, and China Smith. In June 1994, the stations' call signs were changed to KACD/KBCD as a promotional tie-in to a service the station offered, where one could purchase a CD of music played on the station by dialing an 800 number. In October 1994, the station began airing Egil Aalvik Music Co.'s syndicated programs "Groove Radio International", "The House Groove", and "Planet Reggae", Friday and Saturday nights.

(KBJZ is now a low-power jazz and variety station in Juneau, Alaska.)

=== CD 103.1 ===
On April 24, 1995, the station adopted a hot AC format, branded as "CD 103.1". Music from the 1970s, 1980s, and 1990s was played in 15-minute blocks.

=== Groove Radio ===
On June 21, 1996, at 6 p.m., the station adopted a dance music format, branded "Groove Radio". Swedish Egil returned as program director. Groove Radio had a morning drive time show hosted by Jim "The Poorman" Trenton, an L.A. radio veteran and one of the two original co-hosts of the radio show "Loveline" on KROQ. Other on-air personalities included Joe "The Boomer" Servantez, Holly Adams, Christian B, China Smith, and Swedish Egil.

In August 1997, Egil was forced out of the station after the owners once again decided that they wanted the station to go in a mainstream direction, and the station was rebranded as "Groove 103.1", since Egil owned rights to the "Groove Radio" name. On September 18, 1997, the owners switched it to a rhythmic contemporary format, but after the flooding of negative feedback crashed their voicemail system, they brought the Dance format back a week later, continuing with an electronica-intensive dance hits format for a year. In 1998, KACD and KBCD were sold to Jacor Communications for $35 million, and on October 12, 1998, at noon, after playing "Children" by Robert Miles, the stations began simulcasting Jacor's KIIS-FM.

=== Channel 103.1 ===
At 5 p.m. on October 19, 1998, the simulcast ended and the station adopted an adult album alternative (AAA) format, programmed by Nicole Sandler. The format was launched with a speech by Sandler. The first song played was "People Get Ready" by Ziggy Marley. The station was branded "Channel 103.1" with the slogan "World Class Rock". Program director Nicole Sandler was also afternoon DJ and Andy Chanley, previously with KLYY (Y107), handled the morning shift.

In 2000, after Clear Channel merged with AMFM, the company would own too many stations in the Los Angeles area, according to Federal Communications Commission rules. It was decided that KACD and KBCD would be sold, due to their small listenership, the fact that they counted as two stations, and the fact that they did not cover the entire Los Angeles market. Channel 103.1 would continue to be heard on the internet, on a full-time web stream at channel1031.com and worldclassrock.com, which lasted until August 2001. "Channel 103.1" also began to air on AM 850 KACD in Thousand Oaks, California, primarily for the purposes of music-licensing, and to keep the station listed in Arbitron.

=== Super Estrella ===
KACD and KBCD were sold to Entravision Communications, a company known for its Spanish language outlets, for $85 million. At 9 a.m. on August 28, 2000, the stations adopted a Spanish hits format as "Super Estrella" (Super Star), as part of a simulcast with 97.5 KSSE in Riverside, California. In 2001, the stations' call signs were changed to KSSC and KSSD.

=== KDL 103.1 ===
In January 2003, Entravision moved the "Super Estrella" format to the newly acquired 107.1 signals from Big City Radio, which today use the call letters KSSE/KSSC/KSSD. The 103.1 FM simulcast was flipped back to dance once again, this time as "KDL 103.1" using the call letters KDLD and KDLE. The format was modeled after KKDL in Dallas. In December 2003, Entravision entered into an agreement with Clear Channel, wherein Clear Channel would sell the advertising on KDLD and KDLE, and on December 22, the station began airing Christmas music, with plans on switching to an alternative rock format after December 25, eliminating the competition with Clear Channel's KIIS and directing it toward CBS Radio's KROQ.

=== Indie 103.1 ===
Indie 103.1's logo

On December 25, 2003, at 11 PM, KDL suddenly rang out in the middle of "James Brown Is Dead" by L.A. Style and "Indie 103.1" was launched, with The Ramones' "We Want The Airwaves" and The Clash's "This Is Radio Clash" being the first two songs played, which were followed by a series of new songs that had never seen commercial airplay before, setting the tone for what would become a musically adventurous and rebellious radio station. The station was launched by program director Michael Steele, music director Mark Sovel, and disc jockey TK.

For a month, the station ran with no commercials or disc jockeys and featured only the voices of listeners from phones messages left on the request line voice mail. Many of the phone messages were angry listeners yelling "You guys suck!" and "What happened to 'KDL the party station'?".

The logo for "Indie 103.1" was designed by "André the Giant Has a Posse/OBEY Giant" street artist Shepard Fairey, who would later achieve fame as the designer of Barack Obama's "Hope" poster for his 2008 presidential campaign.

On February 10, 2004, at noon, the first live DJ appeared on Indie 103.1: Steve Jones — guitarist, songwriter, and founding member of the Sex Pistols. His program, Jonesy's Jukebox, became famous for its freeform music and Jones' unorthodox delivery style, which included long pauses, belches, and the frequent whistling of songs. Jonesys' producer (Indie 103.1 music director Mark Sovel) was dubbed "Mr. Shovel" by Jones and became his on-air foil. The second DJ to appear was TK. Steele actively recruited L.A.-based music notables for the air staff. Within its first year, "Indie" (as it came to be known) was airing live original programs hosted by Rob Zombie, Henry Rollins, The Crystal Method, Christian B and Dave Navarro.

Indie 103.1 quickly grew in popularity among listeners around the Los Angeles area and around the world, although due to limited signal range it was never a ratings winner. In 2004, Rolling Stone magazine declared Indie 103.1 "America's Coolest Commercial Station", and in April 2008, the same publication voted Indie the "Best Radio Station" in the country.

In March 2006, Dicky Barrett of The Mighty Morning Show was dismissed by the station. He was replaced by Joe Escalante, who called his show "The Last Of The Famous International Morning Shows". Escalante's morning show included daily appearances by film director David Lynch, who served as weatherman, and actor Timothy Olyphant, who served as a sports commentator. The show also featured a weekly wine tasting and education hour called "Wino Wednesday", and hosted a number of celebrity guests including Crispin Glover, Christina Ricci, Pat Buchanan, Will Ferrell, Maynard James Keenan, Werner Herzog, Phil Donahue, Kristen Stewart, Harry Shearer, Dennis Hopper, and Andy Dick.

In February 2007, program director Michael Steele left and was replaced by Max "Mad Max" Tolkoff of XETRA-FM (Tijuana/San Diego, "91X") fame. On August 19, 2008, station manager Dawn Girocco announced her departure from the station. Starting in October 2008, longtime specialty shows were either dropped ("Feel My Heat", "Community Service", "Head Trip", "Big Sonic Heaven", "Camp Freddy Radio") or moved to weekends ("Harmony in My Head"). Upon the cancellation of his roots music show "Watusi Rodeo," Chris Morris accused the station of "now being styled as KROQ Jr." in an effort to increase the station's ratings.

In November 2008, Escalante stated he was giving up the morning show but would continue to host an expanded two-hour version of his legal-advice show, "Barely Legal Radio."

On January 15, 2009, Entravision made the decision to drop the "Indie" format. At 10 a.m. that day, after departing station personalities bade farewell to listeners, "Indie" signed off with versions of "My Way" by both Frank Sinatra and Sid Vicious. A 5-song loop and a pre-recorded message urging listeners to listen to the station online was then repeated on the air until midnight on January 17, 2009. The old show continued to air as indie1031.com, an Internet radio program.

References to "Indie 103.1" were seen in the Fox TV show The O.C., the movie Grandma's Boy, and the MTV show Punk'd.

=== Spanish-language formats ===
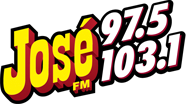
Logo as "José"

After the demise of "Indie", the simulcast flipped to regional Mexican as "103.1 El Gato". The format would later shift to Spanish adult hits as "José". On January 8, 2018, KDLD and KDLE dropped Spanish adult hits and reverted to the regional Mexican format as "La Tricolor".

Logo as "Super Estrella"

On July 26, 2018, at 10:04 a.m., "Super Estrella" returned on 103.1 featuring a Rock en español format.

Logo as "Viva"

On December 16, 2019, KDLD/KDLE changed their format to Mexican cumbia, branded as "Viva 103.1".

On June 1, 2026 Flipped their format from Mexican Cumbia "Viva 103.1" to Spanish Adult Contemporary "Reyna 103.1".

== Signal coverage ==
When the signals were synchronized, they consisted of a 3,000-watt directional signal in Santa Monica and 2,570-watt non-directional signal in Newport Beach. However, in late 2005, an attempt was made to improve signal coverage by adding an extra 700 watts to the Santa Monica transmitter and removing the gain antenna to provide a non-directional signal. The transmitter in Newport Beach was moved a few miles south to a mountain south of Newport Beach, downgrading power to 300 watts but tripling the height. The Newport Beach transmitter was made directional, sending the signal northeast and southwest. This fixed the problem of poor signal along the coastal cities and in Orange County, California. Nevertheless, the combined signals still have poor coverage in some areas of Los Angeles County, notably so in the San Fernando and San Gabriel valleys.
