= WTPS =

WTPS may refer to:

- WTPS Police, A Stand Alone First Nation Police Service situated on the Wiikwemikong Territory of Central Ontario on Manitoulin Island.
- WTPS (AM), a radio station (1240 AM) licensed to Petersburg, Virginia, United States
- WTPS-FM and WTPS (AM), a pair of radio stations operated by The Times-Picayune newspaper from 1947 to 1958 in New Orleans, Louisiana, United States
- WTPS-LP, a low-power radio station (94.1 FM) licensed to Napoleon, Ohio, United States
- WQOS (AM), a radio station (1080 AM) licensed to Coral Gables, Florida, United States, which held the call sign WTPS from January 2006 to October 2007
- What the Papers Say, long-running British television show (1956–2008)
