= KNOR =

Radio station in Krum, Texas

- Krum, Texas; United States
- Broadcast area: Denton–Dallas–Fort Worth metroplex
- Frequency: 93.7 MHz
- Branding: La Raza 93.7

Programming
- Format: Regional Mexican

Ownership
- Owner: MediaCo; (Estrella Radio License of Dallas LLC)
- Sister stations: KBOC, KZZA

History
- First air date: 1984 as KZEA in Pauls Valley, Oklahoma
- Former call signs: KZEA (1984–1986); KTYX (1986–1988); KICM-FM (1988–2003)
- Call sign meaning: NORth Texas; NORman, OK (former city of service)

Technical information
- Licensing authority: FCC
- Facility ID: 36289
- Class: C0
- ERP: 43,000 watts
- HAAT: 600.2 meters (1,969 ft)
- Transmitter coordinates: 33.484833°N 97.412528°W

Links
- Public license information: Public file; LMS
- Website: http://larazadallas.estrellatv.com

KNOR (93.7 FM), branded as "La Raza 93.7", is a radio station licensed to Krum, Texas, and serving the Dallas–Fort Worth metroplex. This station is owned and operated by MediaCo. Its translation in English means "the race 93.7."

== Station history ==
Previous logo

The station was first established as 105.7 KZEA in 1984 (then KTYX and KICM) in Pauls Valley, Oklahoma. The station plotted to move to the Dallas area on rimshot 93.7 frequency in 2002. In 2003, the KICM call letters and country format were sent to 93.7's sister station at 97.7-Ardmore, Oklahoma, whose callsign, KNOR and format, were assumed by 93.7, and the station went dark on the same day. The studios were moved to Krum, Texas on August 1, 2003 with signal testing beginning in the fall under a smooth jazz format (nothing more than the same Jazz disc continually repeated); regular programming began in March 2004 under an urban contemporary format as Party 93.7; making it the only time in the 2000s the Metroplex had two urban contemporary radio stations. In 2006, KNOR switched again to a Regional Mexican format now known as La Raza 93.7, much like its sister stations KTJM & KJOJ in Houston, Texas. The switch was kicked off with a music marathon, but the station is working on hiring local DJs. That same year, Liberman bought KNOR's former competitor, Hispanic Rhythmic KZZA from Entravision and flipped that station back to its former Rhythmic Contemporary format around the same time as KNOR's change.

Radio vet Kevin McCarthy was reported to have expressed serious interest in buying the station, but interference from a local media broker, who was trying to force its way in as a middleman on the transaction, ended up ruining the deal. McCarthy then scrapped his dream of ownership and signed on with the new KMSR-990 (now KFCD) as a talk show host.

== Signal ==
Unlike most of the area's FM stations like competitors KLNO and KMVK, which transmit their signals from Cedar Hill, KNOR transmits its signal from Texas' largest structure, the Liberman Broadcasting Tower, Era, located on a ranch in unincorporated Cooke County. Therefore, KNOR's signal is much stronger in the Northwestern parts of the Dallas/Fort Worth metroplex as well as the cities of Decatur, Bowie, Gainesville, and Sherman, to as far north as Healdton, Oklahoma, but is considerably weaker in Dallas, Fort Worth, and areas South and East of the cities themselves.
