= KLYY =

Radio station in Riverside, California

Coordinates: 34.2345°N 117.1409°W

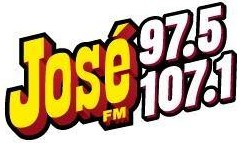
- Riverside, California; United States
- Broadcast area: Inland Empire; Orange County, California; Los Angeles, California; High Desert
- Frequency: 97.5 MHz
- Branding: José 97.5 y 107.1

Programming
- Language: Spanish
- Format: Adult hits
- Subchannels: HD2: Classic Regional Mexican

Ownership
- Owner: Entravision Communications; (Entravision Holdings, LLC)
- Sister stations: KDLD, KDLE, KSSC, KSSD, KSSE

History
- First air date: March 17, 1959
- Former call signs: KDUO (1959–1992); KHTX (1992–1994); KHTX-FM (1994); KVAR (1994–1997); KSSE (1997–2003)

Technical information
- Licensing authority: FCC
- Facility ID: 58809
- Class: B
- ERP: 72,000 watts
- HAAT: 557 meters (1,827 ft)
- Repeaters: 107.1 KSSC (Ventura); 107.1 KSSD (Fallbrook); 107.1 KSSE (Arcadia); 98.3 K252BF (Temecula)

Links
- Public license information: Public file; LMS
- Webcast: Listen Live
- Website: www.joseradio.com

KLYY (97.5 FM, "José 97.5 y 107.1") is a commercial radio station licensed to Riverside, California, and broadcasting to the Inland Empire, High Desert and Greater Los Angeles areas. It is owned by Entravision Communications and it airs a Spanish language adult hits radio format. It operates from studios on Estrella Way in Burbank. Programming is simulcast on KSSE Arcadia, KSSD Fallbrook and KSSC Ventura, all on 107.1 FM.

KLYY is considered a "superpower" FM station. It has an effective radiated power (ERP) of 72,000 watts, broadcasting from a tower 300 feet taller than the Empire State Building. Its transmitter is on Ongo Camp Road in Lake Arrowhead, California, in the San Bernardino National Forest.

== History ==
=== Christian radio and Easy Listening ===
The station signed on the air on March 17, 1959. The original call sign was KDUO, airing Christian radio programming. When it was a construction permit, its call letters were KQXM, owned by Leslie Morgan Wills, but the permit was sold before it signed on. The KDUO call letters were used as a Biblical acronym for the phrase "Do Unto Others". KDUO was initially owned by the College of Medical Evangelists, a predecessor to Loma Linda University, until being sold to the Southeastern California Broadcasting Company and then the KFXM Broadcasting Company.

On January 1, 1962, KDUO became a sister station to KFXM 590 AM (now KTIE). KDUO began airing an easy listening format, featuring quarter hour sweeps of soft instrumental music with an occasional soft vocal. The easy sound lasted for three decades. But by the late 1980s, the easy listening audience began to age and KDUO's Arbitron ratings were in decline.

=== Oldies ===
At 6 am on the morning of January 25, 1992, after playing "Up on the Roof" by the Nick Ingman Orchestra, KDUO dropped the easy listening music format and began stunting. Disc jockeys from other radio stations took over the station and each played a different music format every hour, including classic rock, pop, country, oldies, and smooth jazz. On January 31, at 5 pm, the 97-hour stunt ended with an announcement that the new format would be oldies. The station adopted the name "K-Hits 97.5".

The first song played was "Good Vibrations" by The Beach Boys. Soon after, KDUO changed its call letters to KHTX. Despite the changes, the station's ratings did not improve much; this might be attributed to KHTX's marketing strategy. Instead of a direct challenge to KOLA, which was airing a similar format via satellite, it elected to target KRTH. This move was not successful, likely because it did not cover the entire Greater Los Angeles area and competition in the market was fierce as KCBS-FM aired an oldies music format at this time.

In 1994, KHTX dropped the oldies format and flipped to country music. This put KHTX in direct competition with CBS-owned country leader 95.1 KFRG, which had a loyal listening audience evident by its high ratings. KHTX was acquired by Noggales Broadcasting.

=== Spanish language hits ===
KHTX's format was changed yet again in 1995, this time to Spanish language hits under the call letters KVAR as "Variedades 97.5". In 1997, the station was flipped to Latin pop as “Super Estrella" adopting the call letters of KSSE. On January 16, 2003, KSSE moved to 107.1 FM and a call letter swap landed the present KLYY call letters on 97.5 FM.

On January 8, 2018, Entravision flipped the KLYY/KDLD/KDLE trimulcast, carrying Spanish adult hits format "José 97.5", to Regional Mexican as "La Tricolor 97.5 y 103.1". Just four months later, on May 2, KLYY reverted to the previous Spanish hits format and "José 97.5" branding. On July 26, 2018, the station was flipped to "José 97.5".

On January 7, 2019, the KSSE/KSSD/KSSC simulcast on 107.1 began to simulcast "José 97.5", extending its coverage area to multiple cities and regions of Southern California.

=== History of the KLYY call letters ===
From 1996 to 1999, KLYY was known as alternative rock "Y107" at 107.1 MHz. Spanish hits station, "Viva" (KLYY, KVYY, KSYY) operated on the 107.1 frequency from 1999 to 2003, but was divested by Big City after filing for Chapter 11 bankruptcy. As of July 2018, the 107.1 frequency carries KSSE, a Spanish adult hits station known as "José 97.5 y 107.1".
