= Prairie Point, Texas =

- Unincorporated community
- Location within Texas Location within the United States
- Coordinates: 33°29′43″N 97°28′28″W
- Country: United States
- State: Texas
- County: Cooke
- Elevation: 879 ft (268 m)
- Time zone: UTC-6 (Central (CST))
  - Summer (DST): UTC-5 (CDT)
- Area code: 940
- GNIS feature ID: 1382568

Prairie Point is an unincorporated community in Cooke County, Texas, United States. According to the Handbook of Texas, the community had a population of 22 in 2009. It is located within the Dallas-Fort Worth Metroplex.

== History ==
Prairie Point had a factory, a business, and some scattered homes in 1936. From the 1930s to the 1960s, the population was approximately 25, which increased to an estimated 30 in 1968. In 2009, it was 22.

== Geography ==
Prairie Point is located on Farm to Market Road 922, 20 mi (32 km) southwest of Gainesville near the Montague County line in southwestern Cooke County.

== Education ==
Today, Prairie Point is served by the Era Independent School District.
