= J. Charles Kelley =

American archaeologist

John Charles Kelley (1913–1997) was an American archaeologist who specialized in northern Meso-America and west Texas.

Kelley was born in Era, Texas. After studying at Sul Ross State Teachers College (now, Sul Ross State University) he received his anthropology B.A. from the University of New Mexico in 1937. In the year of his graduation, directed the Harvard Peabody Museum-Sul Ross State Teachers College Expedition in the Big Bend area of Texas. As the Depression resurged, Kelley conducted field work in Texas under the Works Project Administration (WPA) and various academic organizations. In addition to research in Texas, Kelley's work at this time extended across the Mexican border. During the Second World War, he applied his schooling in physical anthropology to research for gas mask design. He was granted a Ph.D. from Harvard University in 1948 based on his work with the School of American Research in Mexico and west Texas: Jumano and Patarabueye, Relations at La Junta de los Ríos. the chairman of his doctoral committee was Clyde Kluckhohn.

In 1949 Kelley began a short stint as the curator of the Archaeology Museum at the University of Texas-Austin. The next year he moved to Southern Illinois University-Carbondale (SIU) to direct that university's museum, which he was charged with modernizing, and to create an anthropology department. At SIU, he continued his work on the archaeology of northwest Texas and adjacent Mexico, but expanding his areas of interest to include more of Meso-America as well as Illinois. Perhaps his most influential publication was his "Archaeology of the Northern Frontier: Zacatecas and Durango" (1971, in Archaeology of Northern Mesoamerica, Part II. Edited by Gordon F. Ekholm and Ignacio Bernal, pp. 763–801. Handbook of Middle American Indians, Vol 11. General editor Robert Wauchope, University of Texas Press, Austin) This article, based on Kelley's work at Alta Vista and the Schroeder site south of Durango, Mexico (the latter undertaken in the mid-fifties), maintained that there were three distinct sister cultures in the Chalchihuites area: Chalchihuites, Malpaso (La Quemado) and Bolaños-Juchipila cultures. After his retirement from Southern Illinois University in 1976, Kelley moved back to Texas, accepting an adjunct position back at Sul Ross State University, and continued his research.

== Selected publications ==
1947 "The Cultural Affiliations and Chronological Position of the Clear Fork Focus," American Antiquity 13: 97-109. Stable URL: https://www.jstor.org/stable/275682. Accessed 2012.12.31.197.

1952 "Factors Involved in the Abandonment of Certain Peripheral Southwestern Settlements," American Anthropologist 54: 356-387. DOI: 10.1525/aa.1952.54.3.02a00080. Accessed 2012.12.31.

1956 "The American Southwest: A Problem in Cultural Isolation," Memoirs of the Society for American Archaeology No. 11, Seminars in Archaeology: 1955: 59-127 Jesse D. Jennings, Erik K. Reed, James B. Griffin, J. Charles Kelley, Clement W. Meighan, Stanley Stubbs, Joe Ben Wheat and Dee C. Taylor. Stable URL: https://www.jstor.org/stable/25146637. Accessed 2012.12.31.197.

1959 "The Desert Cultures and the Balcones Phase: Archaic Manifestations in the Southwest and Texas," American Antiquity 24: 276-288. Stable URL: https://www.jstor.org/stable/277381. Accessed 2012.12.31.197.

1960 "A Revision of the Archaeological Sequence in Sinaloa, Mexico," American Antiquity 25: 547-561. J. Charles Kelley and Howard D. Winters. Stable URL: https://www.jstor.org/stable/276638. Accessed 2012.12.31.

1971 Man across the Sea: Problems of Pre-Columbian Contacts edited with C. L. Riley and C. W. Pennington. University of Texas Press: Austin.
