= XHTLN-FM =

Imagen Radio station in Nuevo Laredo, Tamaulipas

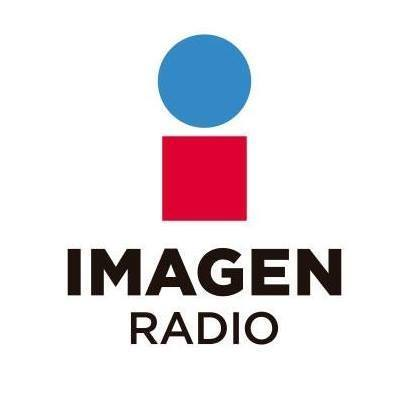
- Nuevo Laredo, Tamaulipas; Mexico
- Broadcast area: Nuevo Laredo, Tamaulipas; Laredo, Texas
- Frequency: 94.1 FM
- Branding: Imagen Radio

Programming
- Format: News/talk

Ownership
- Owner: Grupo Imagen; (GIM Televisión Nacional, S.A. de C.V.)

History
- Call sign meaning: Tamaulipas/Nuevo Laredo

Technical information
- Licensing authority: CRT
- Class: A
- ERP: 1,200 watts
- HAAT: 75.04 m (246.2 ft)
- Transmitter coordinates: 27.4867634°N 99.5024899°W

Links
- Webcast: Listen live
- Website: imagennuevolaredo.mx

XHTLN-FM (94.1 MHz) is a radio station that serves the Laredo, Texas, United States and Nuevo Laredo, Tamaulipas, Mexico border area. XHTLN is owned by Grupo Imagen and airs Imagen Radio programs.

== History ==
XHTLN received its concession on November 29, 1988. It was owned by Víctor Manuel Moreno Torres. In 1998, Torres sold XHTLN to Radio Informativa, a subsidiary of Multimedios Radio. The station was further sold to Imagen in 2006.
