= KEZZ =

- Phippsburg, Colorado; United States
- Broadcast area: Steamboat Springs, Colorado
- Frequency: 94.1 MHz
- Branding: Easy 94.1

Programming
- Format: Adult contemporary

Ownership
- Owner: Don Tlapek; (Blizzard Broadcasting II Colorado, LLC)

History
- First air date: 2009

Technical information
- Licensing authority: FCC
- Facility ID: 165959
- Class: C2
- ERP: 1,750 watts
- HAAT: 380 meters (1,250 ft)
- Transmitter coordinates: 40°22′3″N 106°41′28″W
- Translator: 100.5 K263AC (Canyon Valley)
- Repeater: 94.1 KEZZ-FM1 (Steamboat Springs)

Links
- Public license information: Public file; LMS
- Webcast: Listen live
- Website: steamboatradio.com/kezz-easy-94-1-lite-rock

KEZZ (94.1 FM) is a radio station broadcasting an adult contemporary format. Licensed to Phippsburg, Colorado, the station serves the Steamboat Springs, Colorado area, and is owned by Don Tlapek, through licensee Blizzard Broadcasting II Colorado, LLC.
