= CKLE-FM =

Radio station in Bathurst, New Brunswick

Coordinates: 47°27′45″N 65°29′1″W

- Bathurst, New Brunswick; Canada
- Frequency: 92.9 MHz
- Branding: FM 92,9/FM 94,1

Programming
- Language: French
- Format: Adult Contemporary/Oldies/Country

Ownership
- Owner: Radio de la Baie Ltée

History
- First air date: March 29, 1990
- Call sign meaning: Derived from cle, the French word for "key"

Technical information
- Class: B
- ERP: 100,000 watts
- HAAT: 137 metres (449 ft)
- Repeaters: 94.1 MHz, Caraquet

Links
- Website: ckle.fm

CKLE-FM is a French-language Canadian radio station broadcasting in Bathurst, New Brunswick at 92.9 MHz. The station broadcasts a mix of adult contemporary, oldies and country with some news/talk programming.

== History ==
On July 20, 1987, Radio de la Baie Ltée received CRTC approval to operate a new french-language FM radio station at 97.1 MHz, with a rebroadcaster in Dalhousie at 102.7 MHz. On February 29, 1988, Radio de la Baie Ltée received CRTC approval to operate a new french-language FM radio station at 104.9 MHz in Bathurst. On August 5, 1988, Dalhousie's rebroadcaster received approval to change frequencies to 100.7 MHz.

On September 1, 1989, the CRTC approved the application by Radio de la Baie Ltée to change CKLE-FM's frequency to 92.9 MHz.

On March 29, 1990, both CKLE and CKLE-FM-1 began broadcasting. It is uncertain if the CKLE-FM-1 rebroadcaster was ever implemented. In 1995, CKLE began simulcasting programs on CJVA in Caraquet.

CKLE-FM had a rebroadcaster located in Caraquet on 810 kHz with the call letters CJVA. It began broadcasting on September 15, 1977. In 2016, CJVA moved to 94.1 MHz.
