= XHEDO-FM =

Radio station in Puerto Escondido, Oaxaca, Mexico

- Puerto Escondido, Oaxaca; Mexico
- Frequency: 94.1 MHz
- Branding: La Mejor

Programming
- Format: Grupera
- Affiliations: MVS Radio

Ownership
- Owner: Nueva Esmeralda, S.A. de C.V.

History
- First air date: July 10, 1992 (concession)
- Call sign meaning: Puerto "Escondido"

Technical information
- ERP: 30 kW

Links
- Website: lamejor.com.mx

XHEDO-FM is a radio station on 94.1 FM in Puerto Escondido, Oaxaca, Mexico, carrying the La Mejor grupera format from MVS Radio.

== History ==
XHEDO received its concession on July 10, 1992.
