= KBOC =

Spanish-language adult contemporary radio station in Dallas

Coordinates: 33.437°N 97.485°W

- Bridgeport, Texas; United States
- Broadcast area: Dallas–Fort Worth metroplex
- Frequency: 98.3 MHz
- Branding: Luna 98.3

Programming
- Language: Spanish
- Format: Adult contemporary

Ownership
- Owner: MediaCo; (Estrella Radio License of Dallas LLC)
- Sister stations: KNOR; KZZA

History
- First air date: August 2, 1982; 43 years ago
- Former call signs: KWCS (1980–1993)
- Former frequencies: 96.7 MHz (1980–1993)
- Call sign meaning: Bridgeport's Country (former format)

Technical information
- Licensing authority: FCC
- Facility ID: 64694
- Class: C
- ERP: 93,000 watts
- HAAT: 620 meters (2,030 ft)

Links
- Public license information: Public file; LMS
- Website: Luna 98.3 Website

KBOC (98.3 FM Luna 98.3) is a commercial radio station licensed to Bridgeport, Texas, and serving the Dallas–Fort Worth metroplex. It is owned by MediaCo and airs a Spanish AC radio format.

The radio studios and offices are on Gateway Drive in Irving, Texas. The transmitter is off Farm to Market Road 730 N in Rosston, Texas.

== History ==
On August 2, 1982, this station signed on the air as KWCS. It originally broadcast on FM frequency 96.7 MHz with a country music format that was automated part of the day. KWCS was nicknamed "Wise County Stereo". The station was owned by the Bridgeport Broadcasting Company and was originally powered at only 3,000 watts, limiting its signal to the suburbs northwest of Fort Worth.

In 1993, the station swapped signals with KDVS (now KTCK-FM), moving to 98.3 MHz, and changing its call sign to KBOC. The station kept its country music format. For a time, it was a sister station to KNOR 93.7 FM. Owner Dick Witkovski announced the sale of KBOC to Entravision Communications in early 2005. But that deal fell through.

KBOC then began simulcasting country music from 92.1 KTFW-FM until November 11, 2005, when the station went dark, pending its renewed sale to Entravision. KBOC returned to the air with a Tejano music format on February 6, 2006. It was called "José 98.3". In August 2006, Liberman Broadcasting announced it would purchase the station. The full acquisition took place in November. Liberman changed the branding to "El Norte 98.3."

In 2011, Liberman rebranded KBOC as "La Z 98.3", airing a Regional Mexican format. That lasted about five years. In January 2016, KBOC changed its format to Spanish adult contemporary, branded as "Luna 98.3". In early 2018, Luna 98.3 flipped to Spanish CHR, targeting younger Hispanic listeners and competing with 107.9 KDXX and 107.1 KESS-FM, both owned by Univision Communications.

== Signal ==
Unlike most of the area's FM stations, which transmit their signals from Cedar Hill, KBOC transmits its signal from an unincorporated area within the county borders of Cooke, Montague, and Wise. Therefore, KBOC's signal is much stronger in the Northwestern parts of the Dallas/Fort Worth metroplex as well as the cities of Decatur, Bowie, Gainesville, and Sherman, as far north as Ardmore, Oklahoma, but is considerably weaker in Dallas and areas Southeast of the city itself.
