= KSSE =

Spanish-language adult hits radio station in Arcadia, California

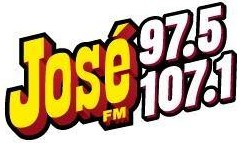
- Arcadia, California; United States
- Broadcast area: Greater Los Angeles
- Frequency: 107.1 MHz (HD Radio)
- Branding: José 97.5 y 107.1

Programming
- Language: Spanish
- Format: Adult hits

Ownership
- Owner: Entravision Communications; (Entravision Holdings, LLC)

History
- First air date: December 3, 1960
- Former call signs: KMAX (1960–1996); KLYY (1996–2003)
- Call sign meaning: Used from former "Super Estrella" format

Technical information
- Licensing authority: FCC
- Facility ID: 35113
- Class: A
- ERP: 6,000 watts
- HAAT: −13 meters (−43 ft)
- Transmitter coordinates: 34°10′51″N 118°01′38″W
- Repeater: 97.5 KLYY (Riverside) 98.3 K252BF (Temecula)

Links
- Public license information: Public file; LMS
- Webcast: Listen live
- Website: www.joseradio.com

Satellite station
- (KSSD)
- Fallbrook, California; United States
- Broadcast area: San Diego County
- Frequency: 107.1 MHz (HD Radio)

Programming
- Language: Spanish
- Format: Adult hits

Ownership
- Owner: Entravision Communications; (Entravision Holdings, LLC)

History
- First air date: November 22, 1977
- Former call signs: KAVO (1977–1986); KMLO-FM (1986); KACO (1986–1992); KBAX (1992–1996); KSYY (1996–2003)

Technical information
- Facility ID: 35139
- Class: A
- ERP: 3,000 watts
- HAAT: 91 meters (299 ft)
- Transmitter coordinates: 33°23′01″N 117°11′20″W

Links
- Public license information: Public file; LMS

Satellite station
- (KSSC)
- Ventura, California; United States
- Broadcast area: Ventura County
- Frequency: 107.1 MHz (HD Radio)

Programming
- Language: Spanish
- Format: Adult hits

Ownership
- Owner: Entravision Communications; (Entravision Holdings, LLC)

History
- First air date: November 1989
- Former call signs: KAXX (1991); KAGR (1991–1992); KAXX (1992–1996); KVYY (1996–2003)

Technical information
- Facility ID: 33567
- Class: A
- ERP: 370 watts
- HAAT: 395 meters (1,296 ft)
- Transmitter coordinates: 34°20′55″N 119°19′57″W

Links
- Public license information: Public file; LMS

KSSE, KSSC, and KSSD are commercial FM radio stations serving Southern California at the 107.1 MHz frequency. KSSE is licensed to Arcadia, California and broadcasts to the Los Angeles metropolitan area, KSSC is licensed to Ventura, California, with its signal covering Ventura County, and KSSD is licensed to Fallbrook, California, serving northern San Diego County. These three stations trimulcast with KLYY in Riverside, airing a Spanish adult hits format known as "José 97.5 y 107.1" from its studios on Estrella Way in Burbank.

KSSE, KSSC, and KSSD are all licensed by the Federal Communications Commission (FCC) to broadcast in the HD Radio format. KSSE's transmitter is located on the ridge of Santa Anita Canyon off Chantry Flat Road in Arcadia, KSSC's transmitter is located atop Red Mountain on Red Mountain Fire Road in Ventura, and KSSD's transmitter is located on Yucca Road in Fallbrook. They are simulcast on 10-watt translator K252BF (98.3 FM) in Temecula from its transmitter off Rainbow Valley Boulevard along I-15.

== History ==
=== Early years of the trimulcast ===
The oldest of the three stations broadcasting at 107.1 FM is the one licensed to Arcadia, California, which signed on in 1960 with original callsign KMAX. It was owned by Max H. Isoard and his Sierra Madre Broadcasting Company; it aired a format targeted at various ethnic groups.

In 1988, John Douglas bought KMAX with the intent to integrate it with other stations that would serve the entire Greater Los Angeles area with a rimshot signal. He accomplished this by purchasing two stations in San Diego and Ventura counties that had been operating separately, middle-of-the-road outlet KAVO in Fallbrook and adult contemporary-formatted KAGR in Ventura, for $2.1 million. Together, these three class A FM stations broadcast a city-grade signal across Los Angeles County and surrounding counties, at a lower cost than purchasing a single class B station.

Initially, the trimulcast retained its format of brokered-time programming, much of which was targeted to African-American Christians. One popular show during this time was Spiritual Vibes, a gospel music show hosted by Ollie Collins, Jr. Also in the lineup was an all-night program playing classic, traditional, and contemporary "Black gospel" music, hosted by veteran gospel music DJ "Sister Ruth" Dixon, known for her signature Caribbean accent.

In 1994, the trimulcast switched to a sports format known as "Sportsmax 107.1 FM" with the call letters KMAX, KBAX, and KAXX. Sportsmax hosts included Joe McDonnell, the SportsGods (Dave Smith and Joey Haim), and Rich Herrera. The stations broadcast games featuring the San Francisco 49ers, Oakland Raiders, and Notre Dame Fighting Irish football teams, and the Los Angeles Ice Dogs of the International Hockey League. Additionally, the triplecast aired urban talk/R&B program The Tom Joyner Morning Show weekdays for a brief time.

In November 1995, Douglas sold the three stations, along with co-owned KWIZ-FM in Santa Ana, to Odyssey Communications for $35 million. The following year, on March 27, 1996 at 4 p.m., Odyssey flipped the trimulcast to a modern rock format branded "Y107", with the stations' respective call signs changed to KLYY, KSYY, and KVYY. Y107 competed directly with Los Angeles' established alternative rock station, KROQ-FM.

=== Spanish formats and Súper Estrella era ===
On December 13, 1999, the trimulcast stations flipped to Spanish adult contemporary as "Viva 107.1". On December 24, 2002, following owner Big City Radio's Chapter 11 bankruptcy filing, Entravision Communications purchased KLYY, KSYY, and KVYY for $137 million in cash and stock. Viva 107.1 remained on air for a short time following the sale.

In 2003, the 107.1 FM trimulcast adopted a hybrid rock en español/Spanish adult contemporary format branded "Súper Estrella". The first rock en español song played was "Cordillera" by Los Enanitos Verdes and the first Spanish AC song was "Amiga Mia" by Alejandro Sanz. Súper Estrella was known to be one of the first and only radio stations to play Spanish Rock and Pop in a highly saturated Spanish Los Angeles radio market, which consisted only of Regional Mexican. The format originally launched in 1997 on KVAR (97.5 FM) in Riverside, then expanded to KACD-FM (103.1 FM) in 2000. Accompanying the flip was a set of new call signs to match: KSSE, KSSD, and KSSC—the first one of these moving from the Riverside station. On July 13, 2007, KSSE started adding three to four English-language songs per hour. The first song in English was "Move Ya Body" by Nina Sky at 9:04 p.m. On April 22, 2012 at 12:05 a.m., Súper Estrella discontinued English songs after playing "Hot Girls" by Dony and Elena Gheorghe and its bilingual version, "La La La (Hot Girls)" by Da Zoo.

On January 5, 2015, the KSSE/KSSD/KSSC trio was among the first Entravision-owned stations to launch El Show de Piolín, a nationally syndicated program hosted veteran radio personality Eddie "Piolín" Sotelo.

On December 1, 2016, after Entravision's other Súper Estrella stations had slowly disappeared across the United States, all air staff was let go and KSSE's trimulcast began stunting. The last song played on Súper Estrella was "Persiana Americana" by Soda Stereo. On December 5 at 12:02 a.m., the station flipped to Spanish variety oldies under the name "La Suavecita". Súper Estrella became an online-only service with four distinct streams.

=== José ===
On January 7, 2019, Entravision broke the 107.1 FM trimulcast briefly. KSSE and KSSD dropped La Suavecita and began simulcasting KLYY (97.5 FM) and its Spanish adult hits format; However, on December 31, 2019, KSSC in Ventura County dropped La Suavecita in favor of José, reforming the original trimulcast. This new trimulcast is branded as "José 97.5 y 107.1", and is made up of KSSE (Arcadia), KSSD (Fallbrook) and KLYY (Riverside).
