= XHGNB-FM =

Radio station in Guerrero Negro, Baja California Sur

- Guerrero Negro, Baja California Sur; Mexico
- Frequency: 94.1 FM

Ownership
- Owner: Jesús Mayoral López

History
- First air date: March 23, 1992 (concession)
- Call sign meaning: Guerrero Negro BCS

Technical information
- Licensing authority: CRT
- Class: A
- ERP: 3 kW
- HAAT: 33.5 m (110 ft)

XHGNB-FM is a radio station on 94.1 FM in Guerrero Negro, Baja California Sur.

== History ==
XHGNB received its concession on March 23, 1992.
