= Leo, Cooke County, Texas =

- Unincorporated community
- Location within Texas Location within the United States
- Coordinates: 33°27′10″N 97°23′41″W
- Country: United States
- State: Texas
- County: Cooke
- Elevation: 787 ft (240 m)
- Time zone: UTC-6 (Central (CST))
  - Summer (DST): UTC-5 (CDT)
- Area code: 940
- GNIS feature ID: 1382138

Leo is an unincorporated community in Cooke County, Texas, United States. According to the Handbook of Texas, the community had a population of 20 in 2000. It is located within the Dallas-Fort Worth Metroplex.

== History ==
The first residents of Leo arrived before the American Civil War. The population had shrunk from 1990 to 2000. The Liberman Broadcasting Tower Era is near Leo.

== Education ==
Today, Leo is served by the Era Independent School District.

== Notable person ==
- Joe Fortenberry, basketball player who competed in the 1936 Summer Olympics.
