= WAKU =

- Crawfordville, Florida; United States
- Broadcast area: Tallahassee area
- Frequency: 94.1 MHz
- Branding: Wave 94

Programming
- Format: Contemporary Christian
- Affiliations: Salem Communications

Ownership
- Owner: Altrua Investments International Corp.

Technical information
- Licensing authority: FCC
- Facility ID: 15532
- Class: A
- ERP: 3,000 watts
- HAAT: 140 meters
- Transmitter coordinates: 30°4′34.00″N 84°18′5.00″W

Links
- Public license information: Public file; LMS
- Webcast: Listen Live
- Website: wave94.com

WAKU (94.1 FM) is a radio station broadcasting a Contemporary Christian format. Licensed to Crawfordville, Florida, USA, the station serves the Tallahassee area. The station is currently owned by Altrua Investments International Corp. and features programming from Salem Communications.

Previous logo
