= KEMB-LP =

Defunct
- Emmetsburg, Iowa; United States
- Broadcast area: Palo Alto County, Iowa
- Frequency: 94.1 MHz

Programming
- Format: Community Radio

Ownership
- Owner: Emmetsburg Chamber of Commerce

History
- First air date: November 1, 2004
- Last air date: July 31, 2024
- Call sign meaning: EMmetsBurg

Technical information
- Licensing authority: FCC
- Facility ID: 134365
- Class: L1
- ERP: 56 watts
- HAAT: 40 meters (131 feet)
- Transmitter coordinates: 43°06′30″N 94°40′45″W

Links
- Public license information: LMS
- Website: KEMB-LP Online

KEMB-LP (94.1 FM) was a low-power radio station licensed to serve Emmetsburg, Iowa. The station was owned by the Emmetsburg Chamber of Commerce, airing a community radio format.

The station was assigned the KEMB-LP call letters by the Federal Communications Commission on January 5, 2004.

In November 2005, the KEMB-LP broadcast studio was dedicated to the memory of veteran broadcaster Dane Roach. He had been instrumental in creating the radio station for the Chamber of Commerce, designing the system and setting up the technical requirements.

In April 2024, the Emmetsburg Chamber of Commerce Board of Directors voted to separate from ownership of KEMB. After months of failed talks with local non-profits to potentially sell the station, KEMB-LP went off air permanently at 5pm central time on July 31, 2024 after playing "Video Killed the Radio Star" and one last Legal ID.

== See also ==
- List of community radio stations in the United States
