= Phippsburg, Colorado =

Census-designated place in Routt County, CO, USA

- Census-designated place
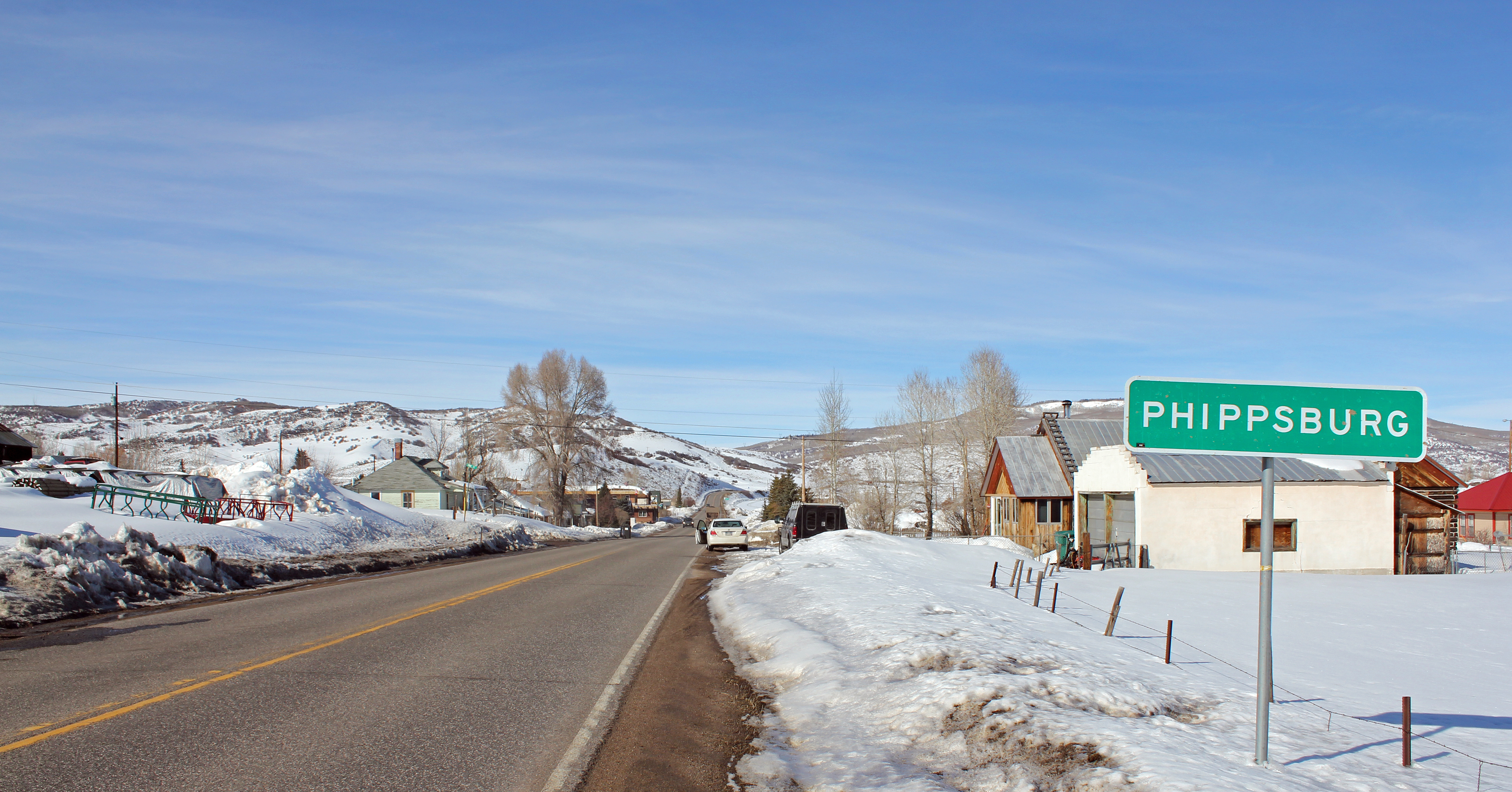
- Entering Phippsburg on State Highway 131, February 2011

- Location of the Phippsburg CDP in Routt County.

- Location of the Phippsburg CDP in the United States
- Coordinates: 40°13′49″N 106°57′03″W
- Country: United States
- State: Colorado
- County: Routt County

Government
  - Type: unincorporated town

Area
  - Total: 1.186 sq mi (3.072 km^{2})
  - Land: 1.186 sq mi (3.072 km^{2})
  - Water: 0 sq mi (0.000 km^{2})
- Elevation: 7,487 ft (2,282 m)

Population (2020)
  - Total: 234
  - Density: 197/sq mi (76.2/km^{2})
- Time zone: UTC-7 (MST)
  - Summer (DST): UTC-6 (MDT)
- ZIP Code: 80469
- Area code: 970
- GNIS feature: 2583279

Phippsburg is a census-designated place (CDP) and a post office in and governed by Routt County, Colorado, United States. The population was 234 at the 2020 census. The CDP is a part of the Steamboat Springs, CO Micropolitan Statistical Area. The Phippsburg post office has the ZIP Code 80469 (post office boxes).

== History ==
The Phippsburg post office has been in operation since 1909. The community was named after Lawrence C. Phipps, a Colorado legislator.

== Geography ==
The Phippsburg CDP has an area of 759 acres (3.072 km^{2}), all land.

== Demographics ==
Phippsburg CDP, Colorado
Year	Pop.	±%
2010	204	—
2020	234	+14.7%
Source: United States Census Bureau

The United States Census Bureau initially defined the Phippsburg CDP for the United States Census 2010.

== Education ==
The community is in the South Routt School District RE-3.

== See also ==
- List of census-designated places in Colorado
