= CJVA-FM =

Radio station in Caraquet, New Brunswick

- Caraquet, New Brunswick; Canada
- Broadcast area: Caraquet
- Frequency: 94.1 MHz

Ownership
- Owner: Radio Acadie, Limitée

History
- First air date: 1977

Technical information
- Class: B
- ERP: 17 kW average 28 kW peak
- HAAT: 65.7 metres (216 ft)
- Transmitter coordinates: 47°46′05″N 65°03′13″W

Links
- Website: CKLE-FM website

CJVA-FM is a French-language Canadian radio station broadcasting in Caraquet, New Brunswick, at 94.1 MHz (FM). CJVA-FM is owned and operated by Radio Acadie, Limitée.

== History ==
On July 18, 1973, Alphee Michaud, on behalf of a company to be incorporated, was awarded a licence for a new AM station at Caraquet. The station officially began broadcasting on its original frequency at 810 kHz in 1977.

In 1995, the station began receiving programs from CKLE-FM Bathurst, New Brunswick, part-time.

In 2014, Radio Acadie submitted an application to convert CJVA to 94.1 MHz. This application received approval by the CRTC on February 13, 2015.

CJVA shut down its old AM 810 transmitter on August 1, 2016. Programming continued on CJVA-FM 94.1.
