= Era, Texas =

Unincorporated community in Cooke County, Texas, United States

- Unincorporated community
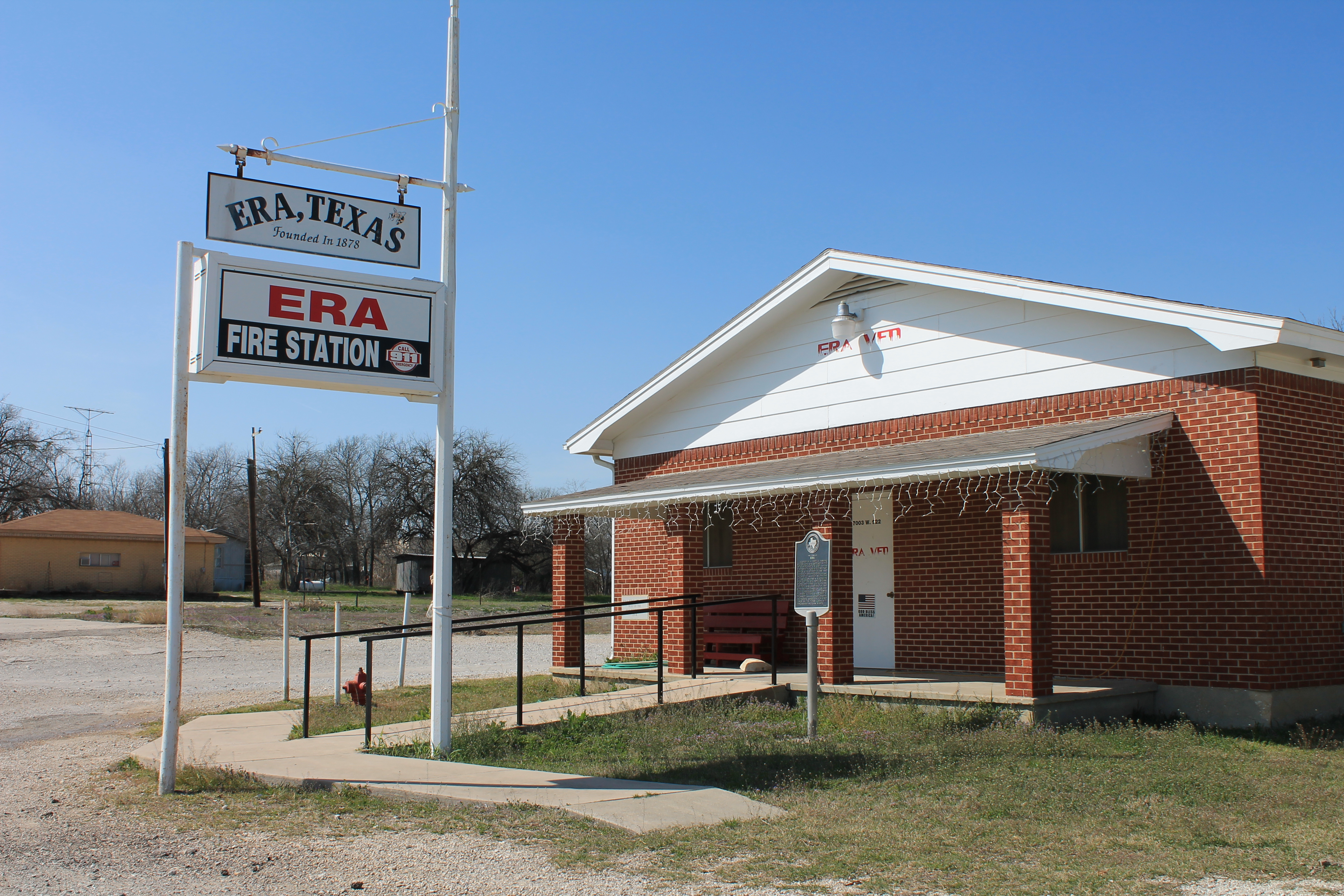

- Location within the state of Texas Era (the United States)
- Coordinates: 33°29′43″N 97°17′17″W
- Country: United States
- State: Texas
- County: Cooke
- Time zone: UTC-6 (Central (CST))
  - Summer (DST): UTC-5 (CDT)
- ZIP code: 76238
- Area code: 940

Era is an unincorporated community in Cooke County, Texas, United States. According to the Handbook of Texas, the community had a population of 200 in 2000. It is located within the Dallas-Fort Worth Metroplex.

== History ==
Approximately seven miles west of Era, there is the Liberman Broadcasting Tower Era, one of earth's tallest structures, and as of May 2007 was the tallest structure in Texas. The tower is named for its proximity to Era, though it is much closer to Rosston and Leo.

In 1860, the Butterfield Overland Mail operated Davidsen's Station, about 4 miles west of Era.

On June 21, 1921, Era had a branch of the Cooke County Library in its vicinity.

The Thomason-Scott House in the community was listed on the National Register of Historic Places.

== Geography ==
Era is located at the intersection of Farm to Market Road 922 and Farm to Market Road 51, 12 mi (19 km) southwest of Gainesville and 30 mi (48 km) northwest of Denton in southwestern Cooke County.

=== Climate ===
The climate in this area is characterized by hot, humid summers and generally mild to cool winters. According to the Köppen Climate Classification system, Era has a humid subtropical climate, abbreviated "Cfa" on climate maps.

Several tornadoes have struck Era. Another EF1 tornado occurred on March 21, 2022. Minor damage to trees and the canopy of a gas station occurred.

== Education ==
In 1878, Judge J.M. Lindsay donated 6 acres (2.4 ha) of land for a school. It had several in 1990. Today, the community is served by the Era Independent School District.

After being formed in 1897, Era Institute offered studies for primary through college levels.

== Notable people ==
- J. Charles Kelley, archaeologist.
- Robert Ewing Thomason, speaker of the Texas House of Representatives, mayor of El Paso, and a member of Congress and federal judge.

== Gallery ==
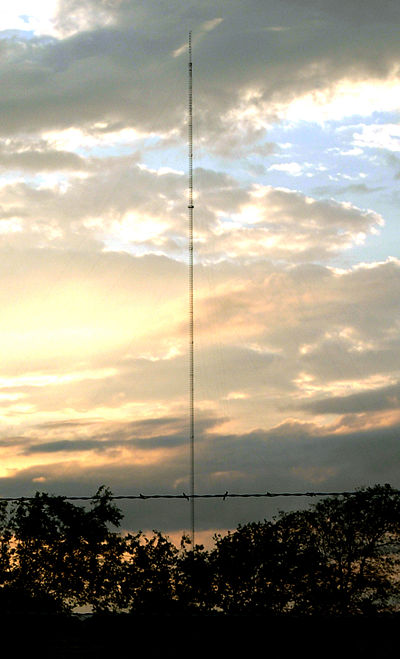
The Liberman Broadcasting Tower, Era, built in late 2006 and pictured here from behind a barbed-wire fence in Cooke County, is the tallest structure in Texas.

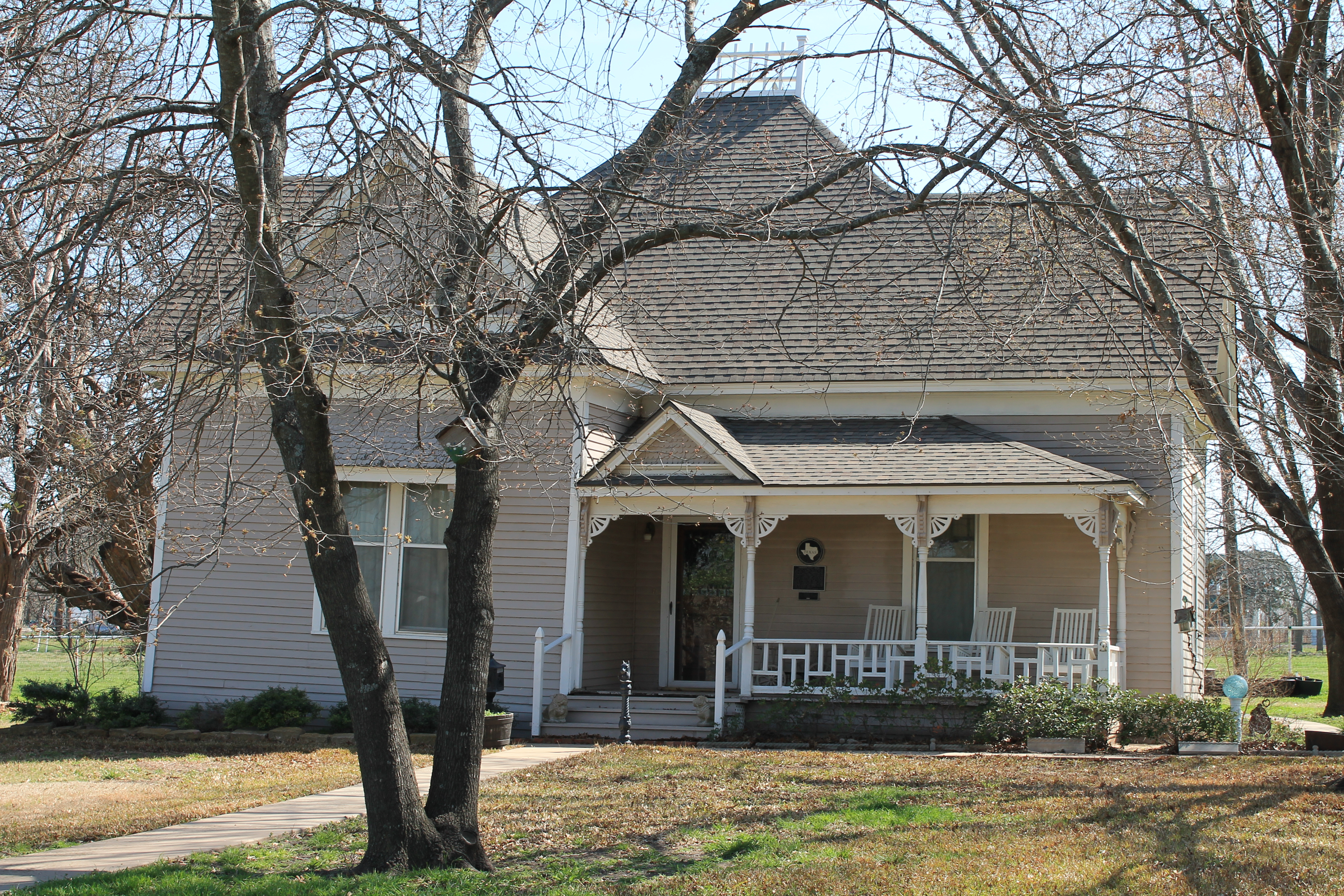
Thomason-Scott House in Era
