= KJAZ =

Radio station in Point Comfort, Texas

- Point Comfort, Texas; United States
- Frequency: 94.1 MHz

Programming
- Format: Silent

Ownership
- Owner: Roy E. Henderson; (S Content Marketing, LLC)

History
- Former call signs: KAJI (1994–2005)

Technical information
- Licensing authority: FCC
- Facility ID: 6022
- Class: C3
- ERP: 25,000 watts
- HAAT: 59.0 meters
- Transmitter coordinates: 28°46′8″N 96°42′39″W

Links
- Public license information: Public file; LMS

KJAZ (94.1 FM) is a radio station licensed to Point Comfort, Texas, United States. The license is held by Roy Henderson's S Content Marketing, LLC. As of December 2008, the station did not have an approved transmitter site and was officially "Silent".

== History ==
According to the FCC history, this station was licensed as KAJI in 1994. The station acquired the KJAZ callsign on December 14, 2005..

The station's first request to "Remain Silent" occurred in 2001, the first of 13 such requests that the FCC has approved.
