= KRDE =

Radio station in San Carlos, Arizona, United States

Coordinates: 33.294°N 110.837°W

- San Carlos, Arizona; United States
- Broadcast area: Phoenix, Arizona
- Frequency: 94.1 MHz
- Branding: 94.1 The Ride

Programming
- Format: Country

Ownership
- Owner: Linda Corso

History
- Former call signs: KRXS-FM (1990–2005)
- Call sign meaning: From "Ride"

Technical information
- Licensing authority: FCC
- Facility ID: 37577
- Class: C1
- ERP: 4,700 watts
- HAAT: 1,039.0 meters (3,408.8 ft)

Links
- Public license information: Public file; LMS
- Website: krde.com

KRDE (94.1 FM) is a radio station licensed to San Carlos, Arizona, United States. The station broadcasts a country format branded as "94.1 The Ride".

KRDE rimshots the East Valley of the Phoenix market. The station also is an affiliate of Fox News Radio and the Arizona News Network.

== History ==
In 1990, the FCC approved a construction permit to build a station at 97.3 in Claypool, Arizona, with the KRXS-FM call letters. Initially built to cover the immediate Claypool area, it relocated to Pinal Peak in 1996. This move made the station a weak rimshot into the East Valley. In 1999, KRXS was authorized to increase its power.

In 2004, KRXS-FM was granted a construction permit to change frequencies to 94.1 MHz. On March 14, 2005, KRXS-FM became KRDE "94.1 The Ride".
