= WXBJ-LP =

- Salisbury, Massachusetts; United States
- Frequency: 94.1 MHz
- Branding: Cool 94.1

Programming
- Format: Oldies

Ownership
- Owner: Salisbury Community TV & Media Center, Inc.

Technical information
- Licensing authority: FCC
- Facility ID: 195189
- Class: L1
- ERP: 63 watts
- HAAT: 36 meters (118 ft)
- Transmitter coordinates: 42°51′4″N 70°51′22″W

Links
- Public license information: LMS
- Webcast: Listen Live
- Website: Official Website

WXBJ-LP (94.1 FM) is a radio station licensed to serve the community of Salisbury, Massachusetts. The station is owned by Salisbury Community TV & Media Center, Inc. It airs an oldies format.

The station was assigned the WXBJ-LP call letters by the Federal Communications Commission on February 10, 2014.
