= Forestburg High School =

Location
- 16346 FM 455; Forestburg, Texas 76239-0415; United States; 33.532452°N 97.563293°W

Information
- Type: Public high school
- School district: Forestburg Independent School District
- Superintendent: John Metzler
- Principal: Karen Wiley
- Grades: K-12
- Enrollment: 184 (2023-2024)
- Colors: Maroon and Old Gold
- Athletics conference: UIL Class A
- Mascot: Longhorn
- Yearbook: Longhorn
- Website: www.forestburgisd.net

Forestburg High School or Forestburg School is a public high school located in unincorporated Forestburg, Texas (USA) and classified as a 1A school by the UIL. It is part of the Forestburg Independent School District located in southeastern Montague County. In 2015, the school was rated "Met Standard" by the Texas Education Agency.

== Athletics ==
The Forestburg Longhorns compete in these sports -

- Basketball
- Cross Country
- 6-Man Football
- Golf
- Tennis
- Track and Field
- Volleyball

Forestburg ISD fielded their first football team in 2007. The Longhorns made the six-man playoffs following a 7–3 regular season in 2012, which included a 38–16 victory over rival St. Jo. The Horns have compiled a 28–43 record since restarting the program.

== See also ==
- List of high schools in Texas
