= CJIK-FM =

First Nations community radio station in Sheshatshiu, Newfoundland and Labrador

Coordinates: 53°30′55″N 60°08′26″W

- Sheshatshiu, Newfoundland and Labrador; Canada
- Frequency: 94.1 MHz

Programming
- Format: First Nations community radio

Ownership
- Owner: Sheshatshiu Radio Society

CJIK-FM is a First Nations community radio station that operates at 94.1 FM in Sheshatshiu, Newfoundland and Labrador, Canada.

The station is owned by the Sheshatshiu Radio Society.
