= Forestburg Independent School District =

School district in Texas, United States

Coordinates: 33.5331°N 97.5626°W

Location
- Forestburg, Texas; United States

District information
- Type: Public
- Grades: PK–12
- Superintendent: Jason Briles

Other information
- Website: www.forestburgisd.net

Forestburg Independent School District is a public school district based in the community of Forestburg, Texas (USA).

The district has one school Forestburg High School that serves students in grades pre-kindergarten through twelve.

== Academic achievement ==
In 2009, the school district was rated "recognized" by the Texas Education Agency.

== Special programs ==
=== Athletics ===
Forestburg High School High School plays six-man football.

== See also ==
- List of school districts in Texas
