= KBKY =

Radio station in Merced, California

- Merced, California; United States
- Frequency: 94.1 MHz
- Branding: Radio Alfa y Omega

Programming
- Language: Spanish
- Format: Religious

Ownership
- Owner: Amador García; (Radio Alfa y Omega LLC)

Technical information
- Licensing authority: FCC
- Facility ID: 78433
- Class: A
- ERP: 6,000 watts
- HAAT: 100 meters (330 ft)
- Transmitter coordinates: 37°27′59″N 120°14′09″W

Links
- Public license information: Public file; LMS
- Website: radioalfayomega941fm.com

KBKY (94.1 FM) is a radio station broadcasting a Spanish religious format to the Merced, California, United States, area. The station is owned by Amador García through licensee Radio Alfa y Omega LLC.
