= KGOD-LP =

- Tenaha, Texas; United States
- Frequency: 94.1 MHz

Programming
- Format: Reading from the Bible

Ownership
- Owner: International Missionary Fellowship Inc. (IMF)

Technical information
- Licensing authority: FCC
- Facility ID: 132836
- Class: L1
- ERP: 24 watts
- HAAT: 60.2 meters (198 ft)
- Transmitter coordinates: 31°52′13″N 94°13′14″W

Links
- Public license information: LMS

KGOD-LP (94.1 FM) is a radio station licensed to Tenaha, Texas. The station is currently owned by International Missionary Fellowship Inc. (IMF).
