= Liberman Broadcasting tower (Era, Texas) =

In Cooke County, Texas, U.S.

Coordinates: 33.484867°N 97.412447°W

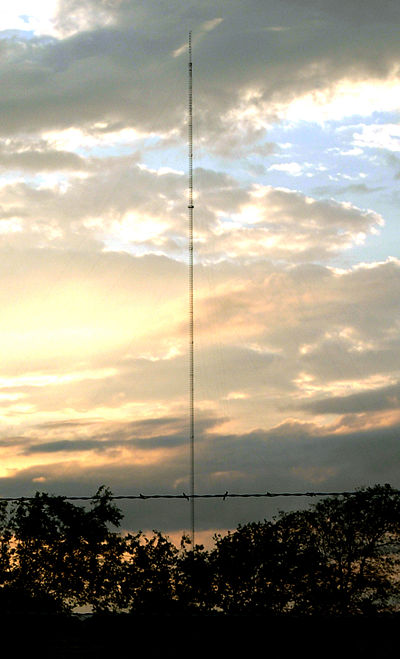
The Liberman Broadcasting Tower, Era, built in late 2006 and pictured here from behind a barbed-wire fence in Cooke County, Texas.

Liberman Broadcasting Tower, Era, is a 2,000-foot-tall (609.6 m) guyed mast located at 33°29'05.5" N and 97°24'44.8" W in Cooke County, Texas, United States. It was built in 2006 and is used for emergency communication and commercial radio broadcasting. Currently, it is used for storm tracking communications and primarily serves as the transmitter for KNOR-FM, 93.7 “La Raza,” a Spanish-language music station playing “Norteño” music (roughly comparable to Contemporary Country in English).

Situated on a private ranch about 7 miles west of Era (north of the Dallas–Fort Worth Metroplex), Liberman Broadcasting Tower, Era, is one of earth's tallest structures (tied for sixth with several other guyed masts); and as of May 2007 was the tallest structure in Texas.

The tower is named for its proximity to Era, though it is much closer to the small communities of Rosston and Leo in unincorporated Cooke County. The tower is now called Tall Towers Venture-Era after the new owners. Liberman sold the tower to Tall Towers Venture, LLC in 2013.

In 2021, the owner was listed as Estrella Radio License of Dallas LLC, 1845 Empire Avenue, Burbank, California 91504, following a change of ownership on February 27, 2020.

== See also ==
- United States tallest structures
- List of masts
