= KVVO-LP =

Coordinates: 32.450°N 99.734°W

- United States
- Broadcast area: Abilene, Texas
- Frequency: 94.1 FM
- Branding: Inspirational Country Radio

Programming
- Format: Christian country; southern gospel

Ownership
- Owner: Wildfire Global Church

Technical information
- Licensing authority: FCC
- Facility ID: 134186
- Class: L1
- ERP: 100 watts
- HAAT: 14 meters (46 ft)

Links
- Public license information: LMS
- Website: ICR Official Website/Web Stream

KVVO-LP (94.1 FM; "Inspirational Country Radio") is a radio station located in Abilene, Texas, broadcasting a Christian country music format. Inspirational Country Radio is owned by licensee Wildfire Global Church.

== Programming ==
The station broadcasts a mix of Christian country, faith-driven songs by mainstream country artists, southern gospel, and classic country. Specialty shows include The Bluegrass Gospel Hour, Country for the Good Life with Texas-based host Tommy Smith, and Sunday Side Up with Ray Sargent. The station broadcasts sermons from Bethel Assembly in Anson, Texas, on a one-week delay.

All staff at Inspirational Country Radio donate their time on-air to the ministry.
