= DYVL =

DYVL may refer to:

- DYVL-AM, an AM radio station broadcasting in Tacloban, branded as Aksyon Radyo.
- DYVL-FM, an FM radio station broadcasting in Bogo, Cebu, branded as Juander Radyo.
