= WTPS-LP =

- Napoleon, Ohio; United States
- Frequency: 94.1 MHz
- Branding: WTPS 94.1 LPFM

Programming
- Format: Contemporary Christian

Ownership
- Owner: St. Paul Lutheran Church

Technical information
- Licensing authority: FCC
- Facility ID: 131752
- Class: L1
- ERP: 100 watts
- HAAT: 14 meters (46 ft)
- Transmitter coordinates: 41°23′36.4″N 84°08′33.7″W

Links
- Public license information: LMS
- Website: stpaulnapoleon.org/radio

WTPS-LP (94.1 FM) is a radio station licensed to serve the community of Napoleon, Ohio. The station is owned by St. Paul Lutheran Church. It airs a contemporary Christian music format.

The station was assigned the WTPS-LP call letters by the Federal Communications Commission on February 4, 2002.
