= KEGR-LP =

- Wasilla, Alaska; United States
- Frequency: 94.1 MHz
- Branding: 94.1 The Kegger

Programming
- Format: Variety

Ownership
- Owner: Rage, Inc.

History
- Last air date: February 13, 2025

Technical information
- Licensing authority: FCC
- Facility ID: 195927
- Class: LP1
- ERP: 100 watts
- HAAT: 29 metres (95 ft)
- Transmitter coordinates: 61°34′22.8″N 149°23′22″W

Links
- Public license information: LMS
- Webcast: Listen live
- Website: mountainofrock.org

KEGR-LP (94.1 FM, "94.1 The Kegger") is a radio station licensed to serve the community of Wasilla, Alaska. The station is owned by Rage, Inc. and airs a variety format.

The station was assigned the KEGR-LP call letters by the Federal Communications Commission on August 31, 2014.
