= KBJZ-LP =

Juneau, Alaska; United States
- Frequency: 94.1 MHz

Programming
- Format: Jazz and variety

Ownership
- Owner: Gastineau Broadcasting Corporation

Technical information
- Licensing authority: FCC
- Facility ID: 123926
- Class: LP1
- ERP: 100 watts
- HAAT: −321 meters (−1,053 ft)
- Transmitter coordinates: 58°16′59.00″N 134°24′28.00″W

Links
- Public license information: LMS
- Webcast: KBJZ-LP Webstream
- Website: KBJZ-LP Online

KBJZ-LP (94.1 FM) is a low power FM radio station serving downtown Juneau, Alaska, and parts of the adjacent Douglas Island. The station broadcasts multiple musical genres, ranging from jazz, as its call sign implies, to classic rock and hip-hop. The station is owned by Gastineau Broadcasting Corporation.
