= KZZA =

Radio station in Muenster, Texas

- Muenster, Texas; United States
- Broadcast area: Northern sections of the Dallas–Fort Worth metroplex
- Frequency: 106.7 MHz
- Branding: La Ranchera 106.7 FM

Programming
- Language: Spanish
- Format: Regional Mexican

Ownership
- Owner: MediaCo; (Estrella Radio License of Dallas LLC)
- Sister stations: KBOC, KNOR

History
- First air date: September 9, 1990; 35 years ago
- Former call signs: KXGM (1990–2002); KKDL (2002–2005)
- Former frequencies: 106.5 MHz (1990–2002)
- Call sign meaning: Casa (previous format)

Technical information
- Licensing authority: FCC
- Facility ID: 23017
- Class: C
- ERP: 75,000 watts
- HAAT: 620 meters (2,030 ft)
- Transmitter coordinates: 32°26′13″N 97°29′6″W

Links
- Public license information: Public file; LMS
- Website: larancheradallas.estrellatv.com/radio/la-ranchera-dallas

KZZA (106.7 MHz "La Ranchera 106.7 FM") is a commercial radio station licensed to Muenster, Texas, and serving northern communities in the Dallas–Fort Worth metroplex. It is owned by MediaCo, and broadcasts a gold-based regional Mexican radio format.

KZZA has an effective radiated power (ERP) of 75,000 watts. Its transmitter is off Farm-to-Market Road 730 North in Rosston, Texas.

== History ==
=== Oldies and Dance ===
The station signed on the air on September 9, 1990, with the call sign KXGM at 106.5 MHz, airing an oldies format. In 2001, it moved to 106.7 and was sold to Entravision. However, in exchange for the move it was agreed with HBC that it would not change to a Spanish-language format for five years.

On August 14, 2002, it launched another English-language format, Dance Top 40, as KKDL (106.7 KDL).

=== "Casa" Rhythmic Contemporary ===
On February 16, 2005, it moved in a bilingual rhythmic contemporary direction as KZZA, "CASA 106.7", in an attempt to target a younger 18-34 audience, mostly third-generation Hispanics. At first, its musical direction focused more along the lines of a typical rhythmic direction. But by 2006, KZZA began leaning more towards "Hurban" product and less dependent on traditional rhythmic fare, resulting in the station going "Hurban" full-time.

On August 4, 2006, Liberman Broadcasting bought five radio stations including KZZA from Entravision Communications.

After a year of 'Urban' programming, KZZA began to shift back to a more conventional rhythmic direction. As a result of this, R&R and BDS moved KZZA back to their rhythmic panels in May 2007. With that move, Casa 106.7 was marketed under the slogan "Hip-Hop Y Mas".

On July 7, 2008, the station shifted back to Hispanic rhythmic.

=== Classic Regional Mexican ===
On April 6, 2009, the station again switched formats, this time to Spanish language Classic Regional Mexican music as "La Bonita 106.7."

On September 4, 2016, Liberman Broadcasting kept the same format but under a new name as "La Ranchera 106.7". From the time of the rebranding until 2018 and again in September 2019, KZZA was simulcast on KZMP 1540 AM until it was sold in May 2023.
