= KACD-LP =

Midland, Texas; United States
- Broadcast area: Odessa-Midland
- Frequency: 94.1 MHz

Ownership
- Owner: Helping Others Prepare for Empowerment (HOPE)

Technical information
- Licensing authority: FCC
- Facility ID: 135434
- Class: L1
- ERP: 100 watts
- Transmitter coordinates: 31°59′22.7″N 102°6′6.2″W

Links
- Public license information: LMS

KACD-LP (94.1 FM) is a low-power FM radio station licensed to Midland, Texas, United States, serving the Odessa-Midland area. The station is currently owned by Helping Others Prepare for Empowerment (HOPE). The station went silent on May 26, 2020.
