= Forestburg, Texas =

- Unincorporated community
- Location within Texas Location within the United States
- Coordinates: 33°31′59″N 97°33′24″W
- Country: United States
- State: Texas
- County: Montague
- Elevation: 1,165 ft (355 m)
- Time zone: UTC-6 (Central (CST))
  - Summer (DST): UTC-5 (CDT)
- Area code: 940
- GNIS feature ID: 1357570

Forestburg is an unincorporated community in Montague County, Texas, United States. According to the Handbook of Texas, the community had a population of 50 in 2000.

== History ==
On May 29, 1946, an F2 tornado struck Forestburg. One home was destroyed and another was unroofed. On May 7, 1995, an F3 tornado struck Forestburg, killing two.

== Geography ==
Forestburg is located at the intersection of Farm to Market Roads 455, 1655, 922, and 677, 15 mi (24 km) southeast of Montague, 23 mi (37 km) east of Bowie, and 32 mi (51 km) northwest of Denton in southeastern Montague County.

=== Climate ===
The climate in this area is characterized by hot, humid summers and generally mild to cool winters. According to the Köppen Climate Classification system, Forestburg has a humid subtropical climate, abbreviated "Cfa" on climate maps.

== Arts and culture ==
The Forestburg Rodeo is held each summer, featuring calf roping, barrel racing, and bull riding events.

== Education ==
Forestburg had the county's first school in 1858.

The community of Forestburg is served by the Forestburg Independent School District and is home to the Forestburg High School Longhorns.

On May 17, 1889, two students at Forestburg School were killed in a tornado.

== See also ==
Farm to Market Road 1749
