= Era Independent School District =

School district in Texas

Address
- 108 Hargrove St ESC Region 11 Era, Cooke County, Texas, 76238; United States

District information
- Type: Public
- Grades: Pre-K through 12
- Superintendent: Curtis Eldridge
- Governing agency: Texas Education Agency
- Schools: 1
- Budget: $4.84 million (2015-2016)
- NCES District ID: 4818600

Students and staff
- Students: 479 (2017-2018)
- Teachers: 38.06 (2017-2018)
- Staff: 61.63 (2017-2018)
- Athletic conference: UIL Class 2A
- Colors: Black and Gold

Other information
- Mascot: Hornets
- Website: www.eraisd.net

Era Independent School District is a public school district based in the community of Era, Texas (United States).

The district is located in southwestern Cooke County and extends into a small portion of northern Denton County.

Era ISD has one school that serves students in grades Kindergarten through twelve.

In 2002, the school district was rated "recognized" by the Texas Education Agency.
