= List of radio stations in California =

The following is a list of FCC-licensed radio stations in the U.S. state of California, which can be sorted by their call signs, frequencies, cities of license, licensees, and programming formats.

== List of radio stations ==
Call sign	Frequency	City of license	Licensee	Format
KAAD-LP	103.5 FM	Sonora	Tuolumne County Arts Alliance	Variety
KAAT	103.1 FM	Oakhurst	Lazer Licenses, LLC	Regional Mexican
KABC	790 AM	Los Angeles	Radio License Holdings LLC	News/Talk
KABX-FM	97.5 FM	Merced	SMG-Merced, LLC	Adult contemporary
KACR-LP	96.1 FM	Alameda	Alameda Community Radio	Variety
KADV	89.1 FM	Garberville	Growing Truth Ministries	Religious
KAEH	100.9 FM	Beaumont	Lazer Licenses, LLC	Regional Mexican
KAFY	1100 AM	Bakersfield	El Sembrador Ministries	Spanish Oldies
KAHI	950 AM	Auburn	Relevant Radio, Inc.	News/Talk
KAHZ	1600 AM	Pomona	Multicultural Radio Broadcasting Licensee, LLC	Chinese
KAIA	95.9 FM	La Mirada	New Inspiration Broadcasting Company, Inc.	Worship music (Air1)
KAIB	89.5 FM	Shafter	Educational Media Foundation	Worship music (Air1)
KAIV	92.7 FM	Thousand Oaks	Educational Media Foundation	Worship music (Air1)
KAJK	96.3 FM	Susanville	Independence Rock Media, LLCt	Adult hits
KAKX	89.3 FM	Mendocino	Mendocino Unified School District	Variety
KALF	95.7 FM	Red Bluff	SMG-Redding, LLC	Country
KALI	900 AM	West Covina	Multicultural Radio Broadcasting Licensee, LLC	Spanish Variety
KALI-FM	106.3 FM	Santa Ana	KALI-FM Licensee, LLC	Vietnamese
KALT-FM	106.5 FM	Alturas	Woodrow Michael Warren	Classic rock
KALW	91.7 FM	San Francisco	San Francisco Unified School Dist.	News/Talk
KALX	90.7 FM	Berkeley	University of California	College radio
KALZ	96.7 FM	Fowler	iHM Licenses, LLC	Talk
KAMB	101.5 FM	Merced	Central Valley Broadcasting Co. Inc.	Contemporary Christian
KAPU-LP	104.7 FM	Watsonville	Ohana De Watsonville	Ethnic/Hawaiian
KARA	99.1 FM	Williams	Educational Media Foundation	Worship music (Air1)
KARC-LP	96.3 FM	Oroville	Calvary Chapel Oroville	Religious Teaching
KARJ	92.1 FM	Escondido	Educational Media Foundation	Worship music (Air1)
KARM	89.7 FM	Visalia	Harvest Broadcasting Company, Inc.	Contemporary Christian
KARQ	88.5 FM	San Luis Obispo	Educational Media Foundation	Worship music (Air1)
KARW	97.9 FM	Salinas	Prunedale Educational Foundation for Central California, Inc.	Worship music (Air1)
KASK	91.5 FM	Fairfield	Continuous Bible Talk	Christian talk
KATA	1340 AM	Arcata	Bicoastal Media Licenses II, LLC	Sports (ESPN)
KATD	990 AM	Pittsburg	Way Broadcasting Licensee, LLC	Spanish brokered
KATJ-FM	100.7 FM	George	EDB VV License LLC	Country
KATM	103.3 FM	Modesto	Radio License Holding CBC, LLC	Country
KATY-FM	101.3 FM	Idyllwild	All Pro Broadcasting, Inc.	Adult contemporary
KAWF	88.5 FM	Selma	Educational Media Foundation	Worship music (Air1)
KAWJ	94.5 FM	Coarsegold	Educational Media Foundation	Worship music (Air1)
KAWK	88.3 FM	Coalinga	Educational Media Foundation	Contemporary Christian (K-Love)
KAXL	88.3 FM	Greenacres	Skyride Unlimited, Inc.	Contemporary Christian Praise
KAZA	1290 AM	Gilroy	Intelli, LLC	Spanish religious
KAZB	94.3 FM	Wilkerson	NYX Communications, Inc.	Classic Hits
KAZN	1300 AM	Pasadena	Multicultural Radio Broadcasting Licensee, LLC	Chinese
KAZU	90.3 FM	Pacific Grove	University Corporation at Monterey Bay	Public radio
KBAA	103.3 FM	Grass Valley	Lazer Licenses, LLC	Regional Mexican
KBAY	94.5 FM	Gilroy	Alpha Media Licensee LLC	Country
KBBF	89.1 FM	Calistoga	Bilingual Broadcasting Foundation, Inc.	Bilingual Talk
KBBL	106.3 FM	Cazadero	Redwood Empire Stereocasters	Worship music (Air1)
KBBU	93.9 FM	Modesto	Lazer Licenses, LLC	Regional Mexican
KBBY-FM	95.1 FM	Ventura	Cumulus Licensing LLC	Adult contemporary
KBCZ	89.3 FM	Boulder Creek	Boulder Creek Recreation & Park District	Variety
KBDG	90.9 FM	Turlock	Assyrian American Civic Club of Turlock, Inc.	Educational
KBDS	103.9 FM	Taft	Chavez Radio Group	Urban contemporary
KBEB	92.5 FM	Sacramento	iHM Licenses, LLC	Soft adult contemporary
KBES	89.5 FM	Ceres	Bet Nahrain, Inc.	World Ethnic
KBFE-LP	94.5 FM	Bakersfield	Palabra de Fe	Spanish religious
KBFP	800 AM	Bakersfield	iHM Licenses, LLC	Sports (FSR)
KBFP-FM	105.3 FM	Delano	iHM Licenses, LLC	Adult contemporary
KBHH	95.3 FM	Kerman	Farmworker Educational Radio Network, Inc.	Spanish/English Top 40/CHR
KBHJ	97.3 FM	Blythe	Northway Broadcasting, LLC	Country
KBHM-LP	95.5 FM	Folsom	KBHM, LLC	Variety
KBHR	93.3 FM	Big Bear City	Parallel Broadcasting, Inc.	Adult album alternative
KBIF	900 AM	Fresno	Overgaard Broadcasting LLC	World Ethnic
KBIG	104.3 FM	Los Angeles	iHM Licenses, LLC	Hot AC
KBKY	94.1 FM	Merced	Radio Alfa y Omega LLC	Spanish religious
KBLA	1580 AM	Santa Monica	Multicultural Radio Broadcasting Licensee, LLC	Progressive talk
KBLF	1490 AM	Red Bluff	Independence Rock Media, LLC	Adult standards
KBLO	102.3 FM	Corcoran	Centro Cristiano Amistad Church	Regional Mexican
KBLV	88.7 FM	Tehachapi	Educational Media Foundation	Contemporary Christian (K-Love)
KBLX-FM	102.9 FM	Berkeley	Bonneville International Corporation	Urban adult contemporary
KBOS-FM	94.9 FM	Tulare	iHM Licenses, LLC	Rhythmic contemporary
KBOV	1230 AM	Bishop	Great Country Broadcasting, Inc.	Classic hits
KBOX	104.1 FM	Lompoc	AGM California, Inc.	Adult hits
KBPT-LP	96.1 FM	Bishop	Bishop Paiute Tribe	Variety
KBQB	92.7 FM	Chico	Results Radio of Chico Licensee, LLC	Adult hits
KBQF	104.3 FM	McFarland	Jab Broadcasting, LLC	Spanish Hits
KBQS-LP	98.9 FM	Sacramento	Sacramento Bicycle Kitchen	Silent
KBRE	1660 AM	Merced	SMG-Merced, LLC	Active rock/Alternative rock
KBRG	100.3 FM	San Jose	Univision Radio Illinois, Inc.	Spanish AC
KBRT	740 AM	Costa Mesa	Kiertron, Inc.	Christian talk
KBTW	104.5 FM	Lenwood	Lazer Licenses, LLC	Regional Mexican
KBUA	94.3 FM	San Fernando	LBI Radio License LLC	Regional Mexican
KBUE	105.5 FM	Long Beach	LBI Radio License LLC	Regional Mexican
KBUU-LP	99.1 FM	Malibu	Zuma Beach FM Emergency and Community Broadcasters	Variety
KBVD	88.9 FM	Alturas	Open Sky Radio Corp	
KBYN	95.9 FM	Arnold	La Favorita Radio Network, Inc.	Regional Mexican
KBZT	94.9 FM	San Diego	Audacy License, LLC	Alternative rock
KCAA	1050 AM	Loma Linda	Broadcasting Management Services, Inc	News/Talk
KCAI	89.3 FM	Linden	Educational Media Foundation	Worship music (Air1)
KCAL	1410 AM	Redlands	Lazer Licenses, LLC	Regional Mexican
KCAL-FM	96.7 FM	Redlands	SBR Broadcasting Corp.	Classic rock
KCAN-LP	92.5 FM	Needles	Tri-State Christian Radio	Christian radio
KCAQ	95.9 FM	Camarillo	Gold Coast Broadcasting LLC	Rhythmic contemporary
KCBC	770 AM	Manteca	Kiertron, Inc.	Christian radio
KCBL	1340 AM	Fresno	iHM Licenses, LLC	Sports (FSR)
KCBP	95.5 FM	Westley	Modesto Peace/Life Center	Community radio
KCBQ	1170 AM	San Diego	New Inspiration Broadcasting Company, Inc.	News/Talk
KCBS	740 AM	San Francisco	Audacy License, LLC	News
KCBS-FM	93.1 FM	Los Angeles	Audacy License, LLC	Adult hits
KCBX	90.1 FM	San Luis Obispo	KCBX, Inc.	Public radio
KCCL	101.5 FM	Woodland	Lazer Broadcasting Corporation	Regional Mexican
KCCQ-LP	105.9 FM	Crescent City	Light of Life Radio	Religious (Radio 74 Internationale)
KCDU	101.7 FM	Carmel	SMG-Monterey, LLC	Top 40/CHR
KCDZ	107.7 FM	Twentynine Palms	Morongo Basin Broadcasting Corp.	Hot AC
KCEA	89.1 FM	Atherton	Sequoia Union High School District	Adult standards
KCEL	96.1 FM	Mojave	Coloma Mojave, LLC	Regional Mexican
KCEO	1000 AM	Vista	Relevant Radio, Inc.	Catholic
KCEZ	102.1 FM	Los Molinos	Results Radio of Chico Licensee, LLC	Top 40/CHR
KCFA	106.1 FM	Arnold	Centro Christiano Amistad Church	Regional Mexican
KCFH	89.1 FM	Two Harbors	Common Frequency	Variety
KCFJ	570 AM	Alturas	EDI Media, Inc.	Various
KCFS-LP	98.1 FM	El Dorado Hills	Camelon Foundation	Variety
KCFZ-LP	93.3 FM	Fresno	Creative Fresno	Variety
KCHJ	1010 AM	Delano	Lotus Bakersfield Corp.	Ranchera/Norteño Oldies
KCHO	91.7 FM	Chico	The Research Foundation, California State University	Public radio
KCHP-LP	97.1 FM	Arcata	Calvary Chapel of Arcata	Contemporary Christian
KCIV	99.9 FM	Mount Bullion	Bott Communications, Inc.	Christian radio (Bott Radio Network)
KCJH	89.1 FM	Livingston	Your Christian Companion Network, Inc.	Christian radio
KCJP-LP	95.7 FM	El Centro	JP2 Media, Inc.	Catholic
KCJZ	105.3 FM	Cambria	Adelman Broadcasting, Inc.	Adult hits
KCLA-LP	100.7 FM	San Pedro	Art in Motion, Inc.	Adult album alternative
KCLB-FM	93.7 FM	Coachella	Alpha Media Licensee LLC	Mainstream rock
KCLM	89.7 FM	Santa Maria	California Lutheran University	Public radio
KCLU	1340 AM	Santa Barbara	California Lutheran University	Public radio
KCLU-FM	88.3 FM	Thousand Oaks	California Lutheran University	Public radio
KCLZ	95.5 FM	Twentynine Palms	Alpha Media Licensee LLC	Mainstream rock
KCMU-LP	103.3 FM	Napa	Napa Radio Project, Inc.	Variety
KCNO	94.5 FM	Alturas	EDI Media, Inc.	Country
KCNQ	102.5 FM	Kernville	Asha Faith James Company	Country
KCNR	1460 AM	Shasta	Free Fire Media, Inc.	Talk
KCPC	88.3 FM	Camino	Nevada City Community Broadcast Group	Variety
KCPK-LP	106.9 FM	Pine Mountain Club	California Family Counseling Network, Inc.	Variety
KCPR	91.3 FM	San Luis Obispo	KCPR-FM	Educational
KCRE-FM	94.3 FM	Crescent City	Bicoastal Media Licenses II, LLC	Adult contemporary
KCRH	89.9 FM	Hayward	South County Community College District	Educational
KCRI	89.3 FM	Indio	Santa Monica Community College District	Public radio
KCRU	89.1 FM	Oxnard	Santa Monica Community College District	Public radio
KCRW	89.9 FM	Santa Monica	Santa Monica Community College District	Public radio
KCRY	88.1 FM	Mojave	Santa Monica Community College District	Public radio
KCRZ	104.9 FM	Tipton	Momentum Broadcasting LP	Top 40/CHR
KCSB-FM	91.9 FM	Santa Barbara	University of California	Educational
KCSM	91.1 FM	San Mateo	San Mateo County Community College District	Jazz
KCSN	88.5 FM	Northridge	California State University, Northridge	Adult album alternative
KCSS	91.9 FM	Turlock	California State University, Stanislaus	Educational
KCTZ	90.3 FM	San Lucas	Iglesia de Jesucristo, en King City, CA., Inc.	Spanish Christian
KCVR	1570 AM	Lodi	Punjabi American Media, LLC	Regional Mexican
KCVR-FM	98.9 FM	Columbia	Entravision Holdings, LLC	Bilingual CHR
KCVV	1240 AM	Sacramento	Radio Santisimo Sacramento, Inc.	Catholic
KCWR	107.1 FM	Bakersfield	Buck Owens Production Company, Incorporated	Classic country
KCXU-LP	92.7 FM	San Jose	Center for Careers and Training	Variety
KCYC-LP	104.7 FM	Yuba City	Sutter County Sheriff's Reserve Association	Christian radio
KCZP-LP	93.7 FM	San Diego	San Diego Catholic Radio, Inc.	Catholic
KDAN	91.5 FM	Marshall	Open Sky Radio Corp.	Variety
KDAR	98.3 FM	Oxnard	New Inspiration Broadcasting Company, Inc.	Christian radio
KDAY	93.5 FM	Redondo Beach	Meruelo Radio Holdings, LLC	Classic hip hop
KDB	93.7 FM	Santa Barbara	University of Southern California	Classical
KDEE-LP	97.5 FM	Sacramento	California Black Chamber of Commerce	Variety
KDES-FM	98.5 FM	Cathedral City	Alpha Media Licensee LLC	Country
KDEY-FM	93.5 FM	Ontario	Meruelo Radio Holdings, LLC	Classic hip hop
KDFC	90.3 FM	San Francisco	University of Southern California	Classical
KDFG	103.9 FM	Seaside	University of Southern California	Classical
KDFO	98.5 FM	Delano	iHM Licenses, LLC	Classic rock
KDGL	106.9 FM	Yucca Valley	Alpha Media Licensee LLC	Classic hits
KDIA	1640 AM	Vallejo	New Inspiration Broadcasting Company, Inc.	Christian talk
KDJK	103.9 FM	Mariposa	Radio License Holding CBC, LLC	Classic rock
KDLD	103.1 FM	Santa Monica	Entravision Holdings, LLC	Spanish AC
KDLE	103.1 FM	Newport Beach	Entravision Holdings, LLC	Spanish AC
KDON-FM	102.5 FM	Salinas	iHM Licenses, LLC	Rhythmic Top 40 (CHR)
KDOW	1220 AM	Palo Alto	Sca-Palo Alto, LLC	News/Talk
KDOX	91.3 FM	Big Pine	Western Inspirational Broadcasters, Inc.	Christian radio
KDPT-LP	102.9 FM	Dos Palos	Dos Palos Radio	Variety
KDRH	91.3 FM	King City	The Association for Community Education, Inc.	Worship music (Air1)
KDRT-LP	95.7 FM	Davis	Davis Community Television	Variety/Pacifica
KDRW	88.7 FM	Santa Barbara	Santa Monica Community College	Public radio
KDSC	91.1 FM	Thousand Oaks	University of Southern California	Classical
KDUB-LP	99.9 FM	Watsonville	Power Broadcasting	Regional Mexican
KDUC	94.3 FM	Barstow	Dos Costas Communications Corp.	Top 40/CHR
KDUP	88.1 FM	Cedarville	Surprise Valley Culture and Arts	Community radio
KDUQ	102.5 FM	Ludlow	Dos Costas Communications Corp.	Top 40/CHR
KDUV	88.9 FM	Visalia	Community Educational Broadcasting, Inc.	Contemporary Christian
KDVS	90.3 FM	Davis	Regents of the University of California	Educational
KDYA	1190 AM	Vallejo	New Inspiration Broadcasting Company, Inc.	Urban contemporary gospel
KEAL	106.5 FM	Taft	Lazer Licenses, LLC	Regional Mexican
KEAR	610 AM	San Francisco	Family Stations, Inc.	Christian radio (Family Radio)
KEBF-LP	97.3 FM	Morro Bay	Estero Bay Community Radio	Classic Rock/Variety
KEBN	94.3 FM	Garden Grove	LBI Radio License LLC	Regional Mexican
KEBR	88.1 FM	Sacramento	Family Stations, Inc.	Christian radio (Family Radio)
KEBT	96.9 FM	Lost Hills	AGM California	Regional Mexican
KECG	88.1 FM	El Cerrito	El Cerrito High School	Educational
KECR	910 AM	El Cajon	Family Stations, Inc.	Christian radio (Family Radio)
KEDR	91.1 FM	Glenhaven	One Ministries, Inc.	
KEFC-LP	100.5 FM	Turlock	Evangelical Free Church of Turlock	Contemporary Christian
KEFR	89.9 FM	Le Grand	Family Stations, Inc.	Christian radio (Family Radio)
KEGE	101.7 FM	Hamilton City	Independence Rock Media, LLC	Regional Mexican
KEGT	106.5 FM	San Miguel	Hispanic Target Media, Inc.	Regional Mexican
KEIB	1150 AM	Los Angeles	iHM Licenses, LLC	Talk
KEJB	1480 AM	Eureka	Bicoastal Media Licenses II, LLC	Oldies
KEJY	790 AM	Eureka	Eureka Broadcasting Co., Inc.	Travel info
KEKA-FM	101.5 FM	Eureka	Eureka Broadcasting Co., Inc.	Classic country
KELR-LP	104.7 FM	Stockton	Eternal Life Radio	Religious Teaching
KEPD	104.9 FM	Ridgecrest	Adelman Broadcasting, Inc.	Spanish Adult hits
KEPT-LP	96.9 FM	Hayward	Calvary Chapel of Hayward, Inc.	Religious Teaching
KERI	1410 AM	Bakersfield	Bob Wilkins Radio Network Broadcasting, Inc.	Christian talk
KERN	1180 AM	Wasco-Greenacres	AGM California	News/Talk
KERU-FM	88.5 FM	Blythe	KERU-FM	Spanish public radio
KERW	101.3 FM	Los Osos-Baywood Park	Dimes Media	Classic country
KESC	99.7 FM	Morro Bay	University of Southern California	Classical
KESP	970 AM	Modesto	Radio License Holding CBC, LLC	Sports (ISN)
KESR	107.1 FM	Shasta Lake City	Results Radio of Redding Licensee, LLC	Adult hits
KEST	1450 AM	San Francisco	Multicultural Radio Broadcasting Licensee, LLC	Multilingual
KETQ-LP	93.3 FM	Yuba City	Queens Avenue Community Church	Community radio
KEWB	94.7 FM	Anderson	Results Radio of Redding Licensee, LLC	Rhythmic contemporary
KEWG-LP	103.9 FM	Ukiah		
KEXA	93.9 FM	King City	Inspiration Media Network, LLC	Regional Mexican
KEXC	92.7 FM	Alameda	Friends of KEXP	Alternative/Indie/eclectic
KEXU-LP	96.1 FM	Oakland	Poor Magazine	Variety
KEYQ	980 AM	Fresno	The Association for Community Education, Inc.	Spanish religious
KEZR	106.5 FM	San Jose	Alpha Media Licensee LLC	Adult Top 40
KEZY	1240 AM	San Bernardino	Hi-Favor Broadcasting, LLC	Spanish Christian
KFAX	1100 AM	San Francisco	New Inspiration Broadcasting Company, Inc.	Christian talk
KFBA-LP	104.9 FM	Bakersfield	Bakersfield Hispanic Education Family Fundation	
KFBG	100.7 FM	San Diego	Local Media San Diego Acquisition, LLC	Regional Mexican
KFBK	1530 AM	Sacramento	iHM Licenses, LLC	News/Talk
KFBK-FM	93.1 FM	Pollock Pines	iHM Licenses, LLC	News/Talk
KFBT	103.7 FM	Hanford	iHM Licenses, LLC	Rhythmic AC
KFCF	88.1 FM	Fresno	Fresno Free College Foundation	Variety
KFEP-LP	99.1 FM	Los Angeles	Echo Park Film Center	
KFER	89.9 FM	Santa Cruz	Santa Cruz Educational Broadcasting Foundation	Variety
KFFW-LP	107.7 FM	Atwater	Iglesia de Cristo Ministerios Llamada Final Atwater	Spanish religious
KFGD-LP	92.5 FM	Fresno	Fig Garden Police Protection District	Jazz
KFGY	92.9 FM	Healdsburg	Amaturo Sonoma Media Group, LLC	Country
KFHL	91.7 FM	Wasco	Mary V. Harris Foundation	Christian talk
KFHM	88.7 FM	Big Bear City	Advance Ministries, Inc.	Christian
KFI	640 AM	Los Angeles	iHM Licenses, LLC	News/Talk
KFIA	710 AM	Carmichael	New Inspiration Broadcasting Company, Inc.	Christian talk
KFIG	1430 AM	Fresno	John Ostlund and Katrina Ostlund	Sports (ESPN)
KFIV	1360 AM	Modesto	iHM Licenses, LLC	News/Talk
KFJC	89.7 FM	Los Altos	Foothill-De Anza Community College District	Educational
KFLG-FM	94.7 FM	Big River	Cameron Broadcasting, Inc.	Country
KFLS-FM	96.5 FM	Tulelake	Wynne Enterprises LLC	Country
KFMI	96.3 FM	Eureka	Bicoastal Media Licenses II, LLC	Top 40/CHR
KFNO	90.3 FM	Fresno	Family Stations, Inc.	Christian radio (Family Radio)
KFOI	90.9 FM	Red Bluff	Alta California Community Media, Inc.	Variety
KFOK-LP	95.1 FM	Georgetown	American River Folk Society	Variety
KFOO	1440 AM	Riverside	iHM Licenses, LLC	News (BIN)
KFOX	1650 AM	Torrance	HK Media, Inc.	Korean
KFPR	88.9 FM	Redding	Research Foundation, California State University at Chico	Public radio
KFPT	790 AM	Clovis	Fat Dawgs 7 Broadcasting, LLC	Sports (ESPN)
KFQM-LP	101.5 FM	Los Angeles	Craft & Folk Art Museum	
KFRB	91.3 FM	Bakersfield	Family Stations, Inc.	Christian radio (Family Radio)
KFRC-FM	106.9 FM	San Francisco	Audacy License, LLC	News
KFRG	95.1 FM	San Bernardino	Audacy License, LLC	Country
KFRN	1280 AM	Long Beach	Family Stations, Inc.	Christian radio (Family Radio)
KFRR	104.1 FM	Woodlake	One Putt	Alternative rock
KFRS	89.9 FM	Soledad	Family Stations, Inc.	Christian radio (Family Radio)
KFSD	1450 AM	Escondido	IHS Media	Spanish Catholic
KFSG	1690 AM	Roseville	Way Broadcasting Licensee, LLC	Multilingual
KFSO-FM	92.9 FM	Visalia	iHM Licenses, LLC	Spanish Adult hits
KFSQ	1270 AM	Thousand Palms	KGAY PSP	Sports (FSR)
KFSR	90.7 FM	Fresno	California State University – Fresno	Variety
KFUG-LP	101.1 FM	Crescent City	KFUG Community Radio, Inc.	Variety
KFWB	980 AM	Los Angeles	Lotus Los Angeles Corp.	Regional Mexican
KFXM-LP	94.1 FM	Cherry Valley	Urban Ingenuity, Inc.	Classic country
KFYV	105.5 FM	Ojai	Gold Coast Broadcasting LLC	Top 40/CHR
KFZR-LP	93.3 FM	Frazier Park	Mountain Radio	Variety
KGAM	106.3 FM	Merced	Lazer Licenses, LLC	Spanish AC
KGAP-LP	96.7 FM	Los Angeles	Materials & Applications	
KGAR-LP	93.3 FM	Lemoore	Lemoore Union High School District	Variety
KGAY-FM	103.1 FM	Palm Desert	KGAY PSP	LGBTQ programming
KGB	760 AM	San Diego	iHM Licenses, LLC	Sports (FSR)
KGB-FM	101.5 FM	San Diego	iHM Licenses, LLC	Classic rock
KGBA	1490 AM	Calexico	The Voice of International Christian Evangelism, Inc.	Contemporary Christian
KGBA-FM	100.1 FM	Holtville	The Voice of International Christian Evangelism, Inc.	Contemporary Christian
KGBB	103.9 FM	Edwards	Adelman Broadcasting, Inc.	Adult hits
KGBN	1190 AM	Anaheim	Korean Gospel Broadcasting Network	Korean
KGCE-LP	107.9 FM	Modesto	Grace Orthodox Presbyterian Church of Modesto, CA	Religious Teaching
KGDM-LP	105.3 FM	Merced	Calvary Chapel of Merced	Contemporary Christian
KGDP-FM	90.5 FM	Santa Maria	Family Life Broadcasting, Inc.	Religious (Family Life Radio)
KGED	1680 AM	Fresno	Bendita Eucarista Radio, Inc.	Regional Mexican
KGEN	1370 AM	Tulare	JA Ventures, Inc.	Regional Mexican
KGEN-FM	94.5 FM	Hanford	JA Ventures, Inc.	Regional Mexican
KGEO	1230 AM	Bakersfield	AGM California	Sports (ESPN)
KGFI-LP	101.5 FM	Anaheim	G Final Cut Inc	Variety
KGFM	101.5 FM	Bakersfield	AGM California	Adult hits
KGGI	99.1 FM	Riverside	iHM Licenses, LLC	Rhythmic contemporary
KGGN	102.5 FM	Hemet	First Baptist Church of Hemet	Contemporary Christian
KGGV-LP	95.1 FM	Guerneville	Multi Media Educational Foundation	Community radio
KGIG-LP	106.1 FM	Salida	Fellowship Of The Earth (Fote)	Variety
KGMX	106.3 FM	Lancaster	High Desert Broadcasting LLC	Top 40/CHR
KGMZ-FM	95.7 FM	San Francisco	Audacy License, LLC	Sports (FSR)
KGPC-LP	96.9 FM	Oakland	Peralta Community College District	Variety
KGRB	94.3 FM	Jackson	Lazer Licenses, LLC	Regional Mexican
KGSV	660 AM	Oildale	XL Media (CA) Inc.	Punjabi Music
KGUA	88.3 FM	Gualala	Native Media Resource Center	Variety
KGXX	100.7 FM	Susanville	Independence Rock Media, LLC	Country
KGXY-LP	99.3 FM	Muir Beach	Galaxy Cat	Variety
KGZO	90.9 FM	Shafter	The Association for Community Education, Inc.	Spanish Christian
KHAP	89.1 FM	Chico	Family Stations, Inc.	Christian radio (Family Radio)
KHAY	100.7 FM	Ventura	Cumulus Licensing LLC	Country
KHCF	89.9 FM	Morgan Hill	Common Frequency, Inc.	Variety
KHCS	91.7 FM	Palm Desert	Educational Media Foundation	Worship music (Air1)
KHCV	104.3 FM	Mecca	Iglesia Pentecostal Vispera Del Fin	Spanish Contemporary Christian
KHDC	90.9 FM	Chualar	Radio Bilingue, Inc.	Spanish Variety
KHDR	94.9 FM	Baker	The Drive LLC	Mainstream rock
KHDZ-LP	104.5 FM	Porterville	Iglesia del Pueblo	Spanish religious
KHEC	91.1 FM	Crescent City	Southern Oregon University	Classical
KHEX	100.3 FM	Concow	Independence Rock Media, LLC	Classic country
KHGE	102.7 FM	Fresno	iHM Licenses, LLC	Country
KHHM	101.9 FM	Shingle Springs	Entravision Holdings, LLC	Bilingual CHR
KHHT	98.9 FM	Mettler	Point Five LLC	Rhythmic oldies
KHHZ	97.7 FM	Gridley	Bustos Media Holdings, LLC	Regional Mexican
KHIP	104.3 FM	Gonzales	SMG-Monterey, LLC	Classic rock
KHIT-FM	107.1 FM	Madera	Lotus Fresno Corp.	Spanish AC
KHJ	930 AM	Los Angeles	Relevant Radio, Inc.	Catholic
KHKK	104.1 FM	Modesto	Radio License Holding CBC, LLC	Classic rock
KHKL	91.9 FM	Laytonville	Educational Media Foundation	Contemporary Christian (K-Love)
KHMS	88.5 FM	Victorville	Faith Communications Corp.	Contemporary Christian
KHMU	100.9 FM	Buttonwillow	Hispanic Target Media Inc.	Regional Mexican
KHMV-LP	100.9 FM	Half Moon Bay	Community Media Foundation	Variety
KHOP	95.1 FM	Oakdale	Radio License Holding CBC, LLC	Top 40/CHR
KHOT	1250 AM	Madera	Relevant Radio, Inc.	Catholic
KHPY	1670 AM	Moreno Valley	El Sembrador Ministries	Catholic (Spanish)
KHRD	103.1 FM	Redding	Results Radio of Redding Licensee, LLC	Classic rock
KHRI	90.7 FM	Hollister	Educational Media Foundation	Worship music (Air1)
KHRQ	94.9 FM	Baker	The Drive LLC	Mainstream rock
KHSF	90.1 FM	Ferndale	Humboldt State University	Public radio
KHSG	89.9 FM	Garberville	Humboldt State University	Public radio
KHSH-LP	94.3 FM	Redlands	Calvary Chapel of Redlands d/b/a Packinghouse Christian FWP	Religious Teaching
KHSL-FM	103.5 FM	Paradise	Deer Creek Broadcasting, LLC	Country
KHSM	103.3 FM	McKinleyville	Humboldt State University	Public radio
KHSQ	107.7 FM	Trinidad	Humboldt State University	Spanish
KHSR	91.9 FM	Crescent City	Humboldt State University KHSU-FM	Public radio
KHSU	90.5 FM	Arcata	Humboldt State University	Public radio
KHTH	101.7 FM	Santa Rosa	Amaturo Sonoma Media Group, LLC	Top 40/CHR
KHTI	103.9 FM	Lake Arrowhead	All Pro Broadcasting, Inc.	Adult contemporary
KHTK	1140 AM	Sacramento	Bonneville International Corporation	Sports (ISN)
KHTN	104.7 FM	Planada	SMG-Merced, LLC	Rhythmic contemporary
KHTS	1220 AM	Canyon Country	Jeri Lyn Broadcasting, Inc.	Full service
KHTS-FM	93.3 FM	El Cajon	iHM Licenses, LLC	Top 40/CHR
KHTY	970 AM	Bakersfield	iHM Licenses, LLC	Sports (FSR)
KHUG-LP	97.5 FM	Castaic	Slaon Canyon Communications	Variety
KHUM	104.7 FM	Cutten	Lost Coast Communications, Inc.	Freeform (radio format)
KHWA	102.3 FM	Weed	Southern Oregon University	Public radio
KHWY	98.9 FM	Essex	Heftel Broadcasting Company LLC	Electronic dance music, Travelers info
KHYL	101.1 FM	Auburn	iHM Licenses, LLC	Classic hip hop
KHYZ	99.7 FM	Mountain Pass	Heftel Broadcasting Company LLC	Electronic dance music, Travelers info
KIBC	90.5 FM	Burney	Burney Educational Broadcasting Foundation	Christian radio
KIBS	100.7 FM	Bishop	Great Country Broadcasting, Inc.	Country
KIDE	91.3 FM	Hoopa	Hoopa Valley	Community radio
KIDI-FM	105.1 FM	Lompoc	Emerald Wave Media	Spanish Contemporary
KIFM	1320 AM	West Sacramento	Audacy License, LLC	Sports (ESPN)
KIGS	620 AM	Hanford	Akal Broadcasting Corporation	Punjabi Music
KIHC	890 AM	Arroyo Grande	Relevant Radio, Inc.	Catholic
KIHH	1400 AM	Eureka	Relevant Radio, Inc.	Catholic
KIHT	104.7 FM	Amboy	Point Five LLC	Travelers Information
KIID	1470 AM	Sacramento	Punjabi American Media, LLC	Punjabi Music
KIIS-FM	102.7 FM	Los Angeles	iHM Licenses, LLC	Top 40/CHR
KIIW-LP	93.3 FM	Dobbins	Gold Country Radio, Inc.	Religious (Radio 74 Internationale)
KILN-LP	99.1 FM	Alturas	The Art Center	Variety
KIMU-LP	98.1 FM	Stockton	With Our Words, Inc.	Variety
KIND-LP	94.1 FM	Oxnard	Mixteco/Indigena Community Organizing Project	Spanish, Mixteco, Zapoteco, Purepecha and other indigenous languages
KINS-FM	106.3 FM	Blue Lake	Eureka Broadcasting Co., Inc.	News/Talk
KIOI	101.3 FM	San Francisco	iHM Licenses, LLC	Hot AC
KION	1460 AM	Salinas	iHM Licenses, LLC	News/Talk
KIOO	99.7 FM	Porterville	Momentum Broadcasting LP	Classic rock
KIOZ	105.3 FM	San Diego	iHM Licenses, LLC	Mainstream rock
KIPE	89.7 FM	Pine Hills	Ink People, Inc.	Variety
KIPW-LP	103.1 FM	Salinas	Iglesia Penetecostal Nueva Vida	Spanish religious
KIQI	1010 AM	San Francisco	Multicultural Radio Broadcasting Licensee, LLC	Spanish brokered
KIQQ-FM	103.7 FM	Newberry Springs	Lazer Licenses, LLC	Regional Mexican
KIQS	1560 AM	Willows	Independence Rock Media, LLC	Regional Mexican
KIRN	670 AM	Simi Valley	Lotus Oxnard Corp.	Iranian
KIRV	1510 AM	Fresno	Centro Cristiano Viva Abundante, Inc.	Christian radio
KISL	88.7 FM	Avalon	Catalina Island Performing Arts Foundation	Public radio
KISQ	98.1 FM	San Francisco	iHM Licenses, LLC	Soft AC
KIST-FM	107.7 FM	Carpinteria	Rincon Broadcasting LS LLC	Regional Mexican
KISV	94.1 FM	Bakersfield	AGM California	Rhythmic contemporary
KITS	105.3 FM	San Francisco	Audacy License, LLC	Alternative rock
KIWI	102.9 FM	Mcfarland	Lotus Bakersfield Corp.	Regional Mexican
KIXA	106.5 FM	Lucerne Valley	EDB VV License LLC	Classic rock
KIXF	101.5 FM	Baker	Heftel Broadcasting Company LLC	Country
KIXW	960 AM	Apple Valley	EDB VV License LLC	Silent
KIXW-FM	107.3 FM	Lenwood	Heftel Broadcasting Company LLC	Country
KJAI	89.5 FM	Ojai	Southern California Public Radio	Public radio
KJAY	1430 AM	Sacramento	Teresa And Trudi Powell Co-Executors	World Ethnic
KJBU-LP	99.1 FM	Oxnard	The Community Advocacy Coalition of Ventura County	Variety
KJCN	107.5 FM	Sutter Creek	Sonora Sierra Heritage Foundation	
KJCU	89.9 FM	Fort Bragg	CSN International	Christian (CSN International)
KJDJ	1030 AM	San Luis Obispo	Centro Cristiano Vida Abundante, Inc.	Spanish Christian
KJDX	93.3 FM	Susanville	Sierra Broadcasting Corp.	Country
KJEE	92.9 FM	Montecito	Montecito FM, Inc	Alternative rock
KJFX	95.7 FM	Fresno	One Putt	Classic rock
KJJZ	95.9 FM	Indian Wells	RM Broadcasting, LLC	Oldies
KJLH	102.3 FM	Compton	Taxi License Corp.	Urban adult contemporary
KJLV	95.3 FM	Los Gatos	Educational Media Foundation	Contemporary Christian (K-Love)
KJMB-FM	100.3 FM	Blythe	James M. Morris	Adult contemporary
KJNI-LP	101.7 FM	Lake Elsinore	Jennifer Smart Foundation	Pre-Teen
KJNY	99.1 FM	Ferndale	Mad River Radio, Inc.	Top 40/CHR
KJOP	1240 AM	Lemoore	Relevant Radio, Inc.	Catholic
KJOR	104.1 FM	Windsor	Lazer Licenses, LLC	Spanish Oldies
KJOY	99.3 FM	Stockton	Radio License Holding CBC, LLC	Adult contemporary
KJPG	1050 AM	Frazier Park	Relevant Radio, Inc.	Catholic
KJPR	1330 AM	Shasta Lake City	Southern Oregon University	Public radio
KJSN	102.3 FM	Modesto	iHM Licenses, LLC	Adult contemporary
KJTZ-LP	96.1 FM	Alameda	Alameda Unified School District	Variety
KJUG-FM	106.7 FM	Tulare	Momentum Broadcasting LP	Country
KJVA-LP	94.3 FM	San Bernardino	Vida Abundante	Spanish religious
KJVV	101.9 FM	Twentynine Palms	Virtues Communications Network LLC	Christian radio
KJWL	99.3 FM	Fresno	John Edward Ostlund	Classic hits
KJZY	93.7 FM	Sebastopol	Redwood Empire Stereocasters	Smooth jazz
KKAL	92.5 FM	Paso Robles	AGM California	Adult album alternative
KKAR	1260 AM	Beverly Hills	Mount Wilson FM Broadcasters, Inc.	Oldies
KKBB	99.3 FM	Bakersfield	Alpha Media Licensee LLC	Rhythmic oldies
KKBN	93.5 FM	Twain Harte	Clarke Broadcasting Corp.	Country
KKBZ	105.1 FM	Auberry	Lotus Fresno Corp.	Bilingual CHR
KKCY	103.1 FM	Colusa	Results Radio of Chico Licensee, LLC	Country
KKDD	1290 AM	San Bernardino	Relevant Radio, Inc.	Catholic
KKDO	94.7 FM	Fair Oaks	Audacy License, LLC	Alternative rock
KKDS-LP	97.7 FM	Eureka	Dell' Arte, Inc.	Variety
KKDV	92.1 FM	Walnut Creek	Alpha Media Licensee LLC	Country
KKGO-FM	105.1 FM	Los Angeles	Mt. Wilson FM Broadcasters, Inc.	Country
KKGX	920 AM	Palm Springs	IVox Radio LLC	Talk
KKHB	105.5 FM	Eureka	Bicoastal Media Licenses II, LLC	Oldies
KKHK	95.5 FM	Carmel	SMG-Monterey, LLC	Alternative rock
KKIQ	101.7 FM	Livermore	Alpha Media Licensee LLC	Adult contemporary
KKJD	91.3 FM	Borrego Springs	Borrego Springs Christian Center	Christian radio
KKJG	98.1 FM	San Luis Obispo	AGM California	Country
KKJL	1400 AM	San Luis Obispo	Pacific Coast Media, LLC	Adult standards
KKJZ	88.1 FM	Long Beach	California State University, Long Beach Research Foundation	Jazz
KKLA-FM	99.5 FM	Los Angeles	New Inspiration Broadcasting Company, Inc.	Christian talk
KKLC	107.9 FM	Fall River Mills	Educational Media Foundation	Contemporary Christian (K-Love)
KKLJ	100.1 FM	Julian	Educational Media Foundation	Worship music (Air1)
KKLM	104.1 FM	Murrieta	Educational Media Foundation	Contemporary Christian (K-Love)
KKLP	91.1 FM	Perris	Educational Media Foundation	Contemporary Christian (K-Love)
KKLQ	100.3 FM	Los Angeles	Educational Media Foundation	Contemporary Christian (K-Love)
KKMC	880 AM	Gonzales	El Sembrador Ministries	Christian radio
KKRN	88.5 FM	Bella Vista	Acorn Community Enterprises	Variety
KKRO	102.7 FM	Red Bluff	Educational Media Foundation	Worship music (Air1)
KKSF	910 AM	Oakland	iHM Licenses, LLC	News (BIN)
KKSM	1320 AM	Oceanside	Palomar Community College District	Variety
KKTO	90.5 FM	Tahoe City	California State University, Sacramento	Public radio
KKUP	91.5 FM	Cupertino	Assurance Science Foundation, Inc.	Variety
KKUU	92.7 FM	Indio	Alpha Media Licensee LLC	Rhythmic contemporary
KKXX	930 AM	Paradise	Butte Broadcasting Company, Inc.	Christian radio
KKXX-FM	93.1 FM	Shafter	AGM California	Top 40/CHR
KKZI	1310 AM	Barstow	Jeff Chang	Travel info
KKZQ	100.1 FM	Tehachapi	High Desert Broadcasting LLC	Classic rock
KLAA	830 AM	Orange	LAA 1, LLC	Sports (ESPN)
KLAC	570 AM	Los Angeles	Los Angeles Broadcasting Partners, LLC	Sports (FSR)
KLAI	90.3 FM	Laytonville	Redwood Community Radio, Inc.	Variety
KLAX-FM	97.9 FM	East Los Angeles	KLAX Licensing, Inc.	Regional Mexican
KLBN	101.9 FM	Fresno	Lotus Fresno Corp.	Regional Mexican
KLBP-LP	99.1 FM	Long Beach	Long Beach Community Television and Media Corporation	Variety
KLBS	1330 AM	Los Banos	Ethnic Radio of Los Banos, Inc.	Portuguese
KLCA	96.5 FM	Tahoe City	Reno Media Group, L.P.	Top 40/CHR
KLDB-LP	99.1 FM	Los Angeles	Future Roots, Inc.	
KLDD	91.9 FM	McCloud	Southern Oregon University	Classical
KLDI-LP	95.5 FM	Lodi	United Women of San Joaquin County	Variety
KLFF	89.3 FM	San Luis Obispo	Family Life Broadcasting, Inc.	Religious (Family Life Radio)
KLGE	94.1 FM	Hydesville	Lost Coast Communications, Inc.	Adult standards
KLHC	1350 AM	Bakersfield	Punjabi American Media, LLC	Punjabi
KLIB	1110 AM	Roseville	Way Broadcasting Licensee, LLC	Vietnamese
KLIE-LP	90.3 FM	Fountain Valley	International Crusade of the Penny	Spanish/Variety
KLIV	1590 AM	San Jose	Pham Radio Communication LLC	Mandarin Chinese
KLJR-FM	96.7 FM	Santa Paula	Lazer Licenses, LLC	Regional Mexican
KLKE	103.7 FM	Garberville	Educational Media Foundation	Contemporary Christian (K-Love)
KLLC	97.3 FM	San Francisco	Audacy License, LLC	Hot AC
KLLE	107.9 FM	North Fork	Latino Media Network, LLC	Regional Mexican
KLLG-LP	97.9 FM	Willits	Little Lake Grange #670	Variety
KLLI	93.9 FM	Los Angeles	KXOS Radio Holdings, LLC	Bilingual AC
KLLK	1250 AM	Willits	Bicoastal Media Licenses, LLC	Silent
KLLY	95.3 FM	Oildale	Alpha Media Licensee LLC	Top 40/CHR
KLMG	97.9 FM	Esparto	Lazer Licenses, LLC	Spanish Hits
KLMM	94.1 FM	Oceano	Lazer Licenses, LLC	Regional Mexican
KLNV	106.5 FM	San Diego	Univision Radio Illinois, Inc.	Regional Mexican
KLOA	1240 AM	Ridgecrest	Adelman Broadcasting, Inc.	Sports (ISN)
KLOB	94.7 FM	Thousand Palms	Entravision Holdings, LLC	Spanish Adult hits
KLOC	1390 AM	Turlock	La Favorita Radio Network, Inc.	Spanish Christian
KLOK	1170 AM	San Jose	Punjabi American Media, LLC	World Ethnic
KLOK-FM	99.5 FM	Greenfield	Entravision Holdings, LLC	Regional Mexican
KLOQ-FM	98.7 FM	Winton	SMG-Merced, LLC	Regional Mexican
KLOS	95.5 FM	Los Angeles	KLOS Radio Holdings, LLC	Mainstream rock
KLPC-LP	94.3 FM	Lone Pine	Lone Pine Advent Believers	Religious
KLQS-LP	97.5 FM	San Fernando	Lancaster Educational Broadcast Service	Variety
KLQV	102.9 FM	San Diego	Univision Radio Illinois, Inc.	Spanish Adult hits
KLRD	90.1 FM	Yucaipa	Educational Media Foundation	Worship music (Air1)
KLRS	89.3 FM	Linden	Educational Media Foundation	Contemporary Christian (K-Love)
KLSB	97.5 FM	Goleta	Educational Media Foundation	Contemporary Christian (K-Love)
KLSD	1360 AM	San Diego	iHM Licenses, LLC	Talk
KLTX	1390 AM	Long Beach	Hi-Favor Broadcasting, LLC	Spanish Christian
KLUK	97.9 FM	Needles	Cameron Broadcasting, Inc.	Classic rock
KLUN	103.1 FM	Paso Robles	Lazer Licenses, LLC	Regional Mexican
KLVB	103.9 FM	Lincoln	New Inspiration Broadcasting Company, Inc.	Contemporary Christian (K-Love)
KLVC	88.3 FM	Magalia	Educational Media Foundation	Contemporary Christian (K-Love)
KLVE	107.5 FM	Los Angeles	Univision Radio Illinois, Inc.	Spanish AC
KLVJ	102.1 FM	Encinitas	Educational Media Foundation	Contemporary Christian (K-Love)
KLVM	88.9 FM	Santa Cruz	Educational Media Foundation	Contemporary Christian (K-Love)
KLVN	88.3 FM	Livingston	Educational Media Foundation	Contemporary Christian (K-Love)
KLVR	91.9 FM	Middletown	Educational Media Foundation	Contemporary Christian (K-Love)
KLVS	107.3 FM	Livermore	San Joaquin Broadcasting Co., Non-Profit Corporation	Contemporary Christian (K-Love)
KLVY	91.1 FM	Fairmead	Educational Media Foundation	Contemporary Christian (K-Love)
KLWG	88.1 FM	Lompoc	Calvary Chapel of Lompoc	Christian radio
KLXB	105.1 FM	Bermuda Dunes	Educational Media Foundation	Contemporary Christian (K-Love)
KLXD	89.5 FM	Victorville	Educational Media Foundation	Contemporary Christian (K-Love)
KLXF	90.5 FM	Modesto	Educational Media Foundation	Contemporary Christian (K-Love)
KLXP	89.7 FM	Randsburg	Educational Media Foundation	Contemporary Christian (K-Love)
KLXR	1230 AM	Redding	Michael R. Quinn	Catholic religious
KLXY	90.5 FM	Woodlake	Educational Media Foundation	Contemporary Christian (K-Love)
KLYY	97.5 FM	Riverside	Entravision Holdings, LLC	Spanish adult hits
KLZN	1490 AM	Susanville	Independence Rock Media, LLC	Sports (FSR)
KMAI-LP	97.9 FM	Alturas	California, State of	Traffic Info
KMAK	100.3 FM	Orange Cove	KMAK-FM, LLC	Regional Mexican
KMBX	700 AM	Soledad	Entravision Holdings, LLC	Catholic (Spanish)
KMBY	1240 AM	Monterey	Hanford Youth Services Inc	Classic hits
KMCR-LP	107.9 FM	Moorpark	Ventura County Community College District	J-pop
KMDR	95.1 FM	McKinleyville	Mad River Radio, Inc.	Rhythmic oldies
KMEC-LP	105.1 FM	Ukiah	Mendocino Environmental Center	Variety
KMEE	92.1 FM	Thermal	Copper Mountain Broadcasting Company	Oldies
KMEL	106.1 FM	San Francisco	iHM Licenses, LLC	Urban contemporary
KMEN	100.5 FM	Mendota	Lazer Licenses, LLC	Regional Mexican
KMET	1490 AM	Banning	KMET, LLC	Talk
KMGV	97.9 FM	Fresno	Cumulus Licensing LLC	Rhythmic oldies
KMIX	100.9 FM	Tracy	Entravision Holdings, LLC	Regional Mexican
KMJ	580 AM	Fresno	Cumulus Licensing LLC	News/Talk
KMJ-FM	105.9 FM	Fresno	Cumulus Licensing LLC	News/Talk
KMJC	620 AM	Mount Shasta	Southern Oregon University	Public radio
KMJV	106.3 FM	Soledad	California Ortiz & 2 Media, LLC	Regional Mexican
KMKE-LP	98.1 FM	Eureka	California, State of	Traffic Info
KMKX	93.5 FM	Willits	Radio Millennium, LLC	Classic rock
KMKY	1310 AM	Oakland	Radio Punjab AM 1310 Inc.	South Asian
KMLA	103.7 FM	El Rio	Gold Coast Radio, LLC	Regional Mexican
KMLM-FM	107.3 FM	Grover Beach	Gold Coast Radio, LLC	Regional Mexican
KMLY	95.1 FM	Gonzales	Lazer Licenses, LLC	Regional Mexican
KMMT	106.5 FM	Mammoth Lakes	Mammoth Mountain FM Associates, Inc.	Top 40/CHR
KMOB-LP	100.3 FM	Clearlake	Minds of Business, Inc.	Urban adult contemporary
KMPC	1540 AM	Los Angeles	P&Y Broadcasting Corporation	Korean
KMPG	1520 AM	Hollister	Promo Radio Corp.	Regional Mexican
KMPH	840 AM	Modesto	Relevant Radio, Inc.	Catholic
KMPO	88.7 FM	Modesto	Radio Bilingue, Inc.	Spanish Talk/Standards
KMQA	100.5 FM	East Porterville	Lazer Licenses, LLC	Regional Mexican
KMRB	1430 AM	San Gabriel	Multicultural Radio Broadcasting Licensee, LLC	Chinese
KMRJ	99.5 FM	Rancho Mirage	R M Broadcasting, LLC	Rhythmic AC
KMRO	90.3 FM	Camarillo	The Association for Community Education, Inc.	Spanish Christian
KMRQ	96.7 FM	Riverbank	iHM Licenses, LLC	Active rock
KMTG	89.3 FM	San Jose	San Jose Unified School District	Variety
KMUD	91.1 FM	Garberville	Redwood Community Radio, Inc.	Variety
KMUE	88.1 FM	Eureka	Redwood Community Radio, Inc.	Variety
KMVE	106.9 FM	California City	High Desert Broadcasting LLC	Country
KMVQ-FM	99.7 FM	San Francisco	Bonneville International Corporation	Top 40/CHR
KMVS	89.3 FM	Moss Beach	Educational Media Foundation	Contemporary Christian (K-Love)
KMWM	101.7 FM	Alturas	Matthew Warren Woodrow	Country
KMXI	95.1 FM	Chico	Deer Creek Broadcasting, LLC	Adult contemporary
KMXX	99.3 FM	Imperial	Entravision Holdings, LLC	Regional Mexican
KMYC	1410 AM	Marysville	E. E. Friesen	Talk
KMYI	94.1 FM	San Diego	iHM Licenses, LLC	Hot AC
KMYT	94.5 FM	Temecula	iHM Licenses, LLC	Adult alternative
KMYX-FM	92.5 FM	Arvin	Farmworker Educational Radio Network, Inc.	Regional Mexican
KMZR	92.5 FM	Atwater	Lazer Licenses, LLC	Regional Mexican
KNAC	96.9 FM	Lenwood	The Drive LLC	Mainstream rock
KNBR	680 AM	San Francisco	Radio License Holding SRC LLC	Sports (ISN)
KNBR-FM	104.5 FM	San Francisco	Radio License Holding SRC LLC	Sports (ISN)
KNBX	91.7 FM	San Ardo	KCBX, Inc.	Public radio
KNCA	89.7 FM	Burney	Southern Oregon University	Public radio
KNCI	105.1 FM	Sacramento	Bonneville International Corporation	Country
KNCO	830 AM	Grass Valley	Nevada County Broadcasters, Inc.	News/Talk
KNCO-FM	94.1 FM	Grass Valley	Nevada County Broadcasters, Inc.	Adult contemporary
KNCQ	97.3 FM	Redding	Results Radio of Redding Licensee, LLC	Country
KNDZ	89.3 FM	McKinleyville	Pacific Cascade Communications Corporation	Christian radio
KNEW	960 AM	Oakland	iHM Licenses, LLC	Talk
KNFS-LP	98.1 FM	Tulare	The Lorax Society	Variety
KNGS-LP	104.5 FM	Hanford	First Unitarian Universal Life Church of Hanford	Classic hits
KNHM	91.5 FM	Bayside	Southern Oregon University	Public radio
KNHT	102.5 FM	Rio Dell	Southern Oregon University	Classical
KNKJ-LP	92.5 FM	Red Bluff	Calvary Chapel Red Bluff	Christian
KNKK	107.1 FM	Needles	Cameron Broadcasting, Inc.	Top 40/CHR
KNLF	95.9 FM	Quincy	New Life Broadcasting	Religious Teaching (AFR)
KNLM	90.5 FM	Yucca Valley	Advance Ministries, Inc., d/b/a New Life Christian School	Christian radio
KNOB	96.7 FM	Healdsburg	JYH Broadcasting	Adult hits
KNRO	1400 AM	Redding	SMG-Redding, LLC	Sports (FSR)
KNSJ	89.1 FM	Descanso	Activist San Diego	Community radio
KNSN	1240 AM	San Diego	Kiertron, Inc.	Christian radio
KNSQ	88.1 FM	Mount Shasta	Southern Oregon University	Public radio
KNTI	99.5 FM	Lakeport	Bicoastal Media Licenses, LLC	Adult album alternative
KNTO	93.3 FM	Chowchilla	Centro Christiano Amistad Church	Spanish oldies
KNTY	103.5 FM	Sacramento	Entravision Holdings, LLC	Country
KNVE	91.3 FM	Redding	Educational Media Foundation	Spanish religious
KNVU-LP	98.7 FM	Victorville	Centro Internacional de Oracion	Spanish Christian
KNWH	1250 AM	Yucca Valley	Alpha Media Licensee LLC	News/Talk
KNWQ	1140 AM	Palm Springs	Alpha Media Licensee LLC	News/Talk
KNWZ	970 AM	Coachella	Alpha Media Licensee LLC	News/Talk
KNX	1070 AM	Los Angeles	Audacy License, LLC	News
KNX-FM	97.1 FM	Los Angeles	Audacy License, LLC	Sports
KNYO-LP	107.7 FM	Fort Bragg	Noyo Radio Project	Variety
KNYR	91.3 FM	Yreka	Southern Oregon University	Classical
KNZR	1560 AM	Bakersfield	Alpha Media Licensee LLC	Conservative talk
KNZR-FM	97.7 FM	Shafter	Alpha Media Licensee LLC	Conservative talk
KOBO	1450 AM	Yuba City	Punjabi American Media, LLC	Punjabi
KOCC-LP	101.5 FM	Oxnard	Calvary Chapel of Oxnard	Christian radio
KOCI-LP	101.5 FM	Newport Beach	Startree 107, Inc.	Variety
KOCL-LP	101.5 FM	Anaheim	The Church in Anaheim	Religious Teaching
KOCN	105.1 FM	Pacific Grove	iHM Licenses, LLC	Rhythmic oldies
KOCP	104.7 FM	Oxnard	Gold Coast Broadcasting, LLC	Rhythmic oldies
KODS	103.7 FM	Carnelian Bay	Americom, L.P.	Classic hits
KODV	89.1 FM	Barstow	Ondas De Vida Network, Inc.	Spanish Contemporary Christian
KOFP-LP	103.3 FM	Fresno	Idefua Foundation for African Arts and Culture	Urban
KOGI-LP	97.7 FM	Big Pine	Big Pine Paiute Tribe of the Owens Valley	Variety
KOGO	600 AM	San Diego	iHM Licenses, LLC	News/Talk
KOHL	89.3 FM	Fremont	Fremont-Newark Community College District	Top 40/CHR
KOIT	96.5 FM	San Francisco	Bonneville International Corporation	Adult contemporary
KOKO-FM	94.3 FM	Kerman	Teg Broadcasting, Inc	Regional Mexican
KOLA	99.9 FM	San Bernardino	Inland Empire Broadcasting Corp.	Classic hits
KOLS-LP	98.5 FM	Oakhurst	Radio Catholic	Catholic
KOMY	1340 AM	La Selva Beach	Zwerling Broadcasting System, Ltd	Talk
KOND	107.5 FM	Hanford	Latino Media Network, LLC	Regional Mexican
KORB	88.7 FM	Hopland	One Ministries, Inc	Christian preaching
KORM-LP	101.5 FM	Corona	Templo Nueva Vida, Inc.	Spanish Christian
KOSC	89.9 FM	Angwin	University of Southern California	Classical
KOSF	103.7 FM	San Francisco	iHM Licenses, LLC	Classic hits
KOSJ	1490 AM	Santa Barbara	Rincon Broadcasting LS LLC	Spanish Adult hits
KOSO	92.9 FM	Patterson	iHM Licenses, LLC	Country
KOSS	1380 AM	Lancaster	High Desert Broadcasting, LLC	News/Talk
KOST	103.5 FM	Los Angeles	iHM Licenses, LLC	Adult contemporary
KOWS-LP	92.5 FM	Occidental	KOWS Community Radio	Variety
KOXC-LP	107.9 FM	Oxnard	Centro Evangelico Emmanuel, Inc.	Spanish Christian
KOXR	910 AM	Oxnard	Lazer Licenses, LLC	Ranchero
KOXZ-LP	93.3 FM	Ventura	La Iglesia Cristiana de Oxnard	Spanish religious
KOYO-LP	107.1 FM	Oroville	African American & Family Cultural Center	Variety
KOYT-LP	97.1 FM	Anza	Anza Community Broadcasting	Variety
KOZT	95.3 FM	Fort Bragg	California Radio Partners, Inc.	Album-oriented rock
KPAT	95.7 FM	Orcutt	AGM California, Inc.	Rhythmic contemporary
KPAY	1290 AM	Chico	Deer Creek Broadcasting, LLC	News/Talk
KPAY-FM	93.9 FM	Chico	Deer Creek Broadcasting, LLC	News/Talk
KPBS-FM	89.5 FM	San Diego	The Board of Trustees, California State University	Public radio
KPCA-LP	103.3 FM	Petaluma	Petaluma Community Access	Variety
KPCC	89.3 FM	Pasadena	Pasadena Area Community College District	Public radio
KPCR-LP	101.9 FM	Santa Cruz	Central Coast Media Education Foundation	Variety
KPDC-LP	104.7 FM	Ukiah		Spanish
KPDO	89.3 FM	Pescadero	Pescadero Public Radio Service, Inc.	Variety
KPEA-LP	96.1 FM	San Francisco	World Peace Through Technology Organization	Silent
KPEG-LP	100.9 FM	Lompoc	City of Lompoc	Variety
KPFA	94.1 FM	Berkeley	Pacifica Foundation, Inc.	Public radio
KPFB	89.3 FM	Berkeley	Pacifica Foundation, Inc.	Public radio
KPFK	90.7 FM	Los Angeles	Pacifica Foundation, Inc.	Public radio
KPFN-LP	105.1 FM	Laytonville	Bella Opus Inc	Variety
KPFZ-FM	88.1 FM	Lakeport	Lake County Community Radio Inc	Variety
KPHD-LP	93.3 FM	Modesto	Central Valley Media Center Inc.	Variety
KPHT-LP	99.9 FM	Laytonville	Long Valley Communications, Inc.	Variety
KPIG-FM	107.5 FM	Freedom	SMG-Monterey, LLC	Freeform Rock
KPJP	89.3 FM	Greenville	Relevant Radio, Inc.	Catholic
KPKW	90.3 FM	Susanville	Relevant Radio, Inc.	Catholic
KPLM	106.1 FM	Palm Springs	R M Broadcasting L.L.C.	Country
KPMO	1300 AM	Mendocino	Southern Oregon University	Public radio
KPOD	1240 AM	Crescent City	Bicoastal Media Licenses II, LLC	News/Talk
KPOD-FM	97.9 FM	Crescent City	Bicoastal Media Licenses II, LLC	Country
KPOO	89.5 FM	San Francisco	Poor People's Radio, Inc.	Variety
KPPQ-LP	104.1 FM	Ventura	Community Access Partners of San Buenaventura	Variety
KPQS	106.7 FM	Waterford	Hispanic Target Media Inc.	Regional Mexican
KPQW	106.3 FM	Willows	Hispanic Target Media Inc.	Regional Mexican
KPRA	89.5 FM	Ukiah	Ukiah Christian Radio	Christian radio
KPRC-FM	100.7 FM	Salinas	iHM Licenses, LLC	Spanish Adult hits
KPRI	91.3 FM	Pala	Pala Band of Mission Indians	Variety
KPRL	1230 AM	Paso Robles	North County Communications, LLC	News/Talk
KPRX	89.1 FM	Bakersfield	White Ash Broadcasting, Inc.	Public radio
KPRZ	1210 AM	San Marcos-Poway	New Inspiration Broadcasting Company, Inc.	Christian radio
KPSC	88.5 FM	Palm Springs	University of Southern California	Classical
KPSH	90.9 FM	Coachella	Family Worship Center Church, Inc.	Christian radio
KPSI-FM	100.5 FM	Palm Springs	Alpha Media Licensee LLC	Hot AC
KPSL-FM	96.5 FM	Bakersfield	Lotus Bakersfield Corp.	Regional Mexican
KPST-FM	103.5 FM	Coachella	Entravision Holdings, LLC	Bilingual Rhythmic CHR
KPSV-FM	91.9 FM	Tulare	South Valley Peace Center	Variety
KPTG-LP	107.1 FM	Adelanto	Calvary Chapel Victor Valley d/b/a Calvary Chapel Adelanto	Religious Teaching
KPTL-LP	96.9 FM	Temecula	Calvary Chapel Bible Fellowship	Christian
KPWK	1350 AM	San Bernardino	iHM Licenses, LLC	Sports (FSR)
KPWR	105.9 FM	Los Angeles	KPWR Radio Holdings LLC	Rhythmic Hot AC
KPYG	94.9 FM	Cayucos	Dimes Media Corporation	Freeform Rock
KPYV	1340 AM	Oroville	Radio Santisimo Sacramento, Inc.	Spanish Catholic
KQAV	93.5 FM	Rosamond	High Desert Broadcasting LLC	Urban oldies
KQBH-LP	101.5 FM	Los Angeles	Boyle Heights Arts Conservatory	
KQBM	90.7 FM	San Andreas	Blue Mountain Coalition for Youth and Families	Variety
KQBM-LP	103.7 FM	West Point	Harry Amyotte Memorial Music Fund	Variety
KQEA-LP	96.9 FM	San Francisco Sunset	Chinese Culture and Art Heritage Foundation	Ethnic/Chinese
KQEB-LP	96.9 FM	San Francisco	Sound of Hope Radio Network, Inc.	Ethnic/Chinese
KQED-FM	88.5 FM	San Francisco	Northern California Public Broadcasting, Inc.	Public radio
KQEI-FM	89.3 FM	North Highlands	KQED, Inc.	Public radio
KQEQ	1210 AM	Fowler	Akal Broadcasting Corporation	World Ethnic
KQEV-LP	104.7 FM	Walnut	Chinese Sound of Oriental and West Heritage	Ethnic/Chinese
KQIE	104.7 FM	Redlands	LC Media LP	Rhythmic oldies
KQIP-LP	107.1 FM	Chico	Calvary Chapel of Chico	Christian radio
KQKZ	92.1 FM	Bakersfield	Lotus Bakersfield Corp.	Spanglish Gold AC
KQLB	106.9 FM	Los Banos	Golden Pegasus LLC	Regional Mexican
KQLH-LP	92.5 FM	Yucaipa	Arrowhead Alliance of the Inland Empire	Nostalgia
KQMS	1670 AM	Redding	SMG-Redding, LLC	News/Talk
KQMX	105.7 FM	Lost Hills	The De Alba Family Trust of 2000	Regional Mexican
KQNC	88.1 FM	Quincy	California State University, Sacramento	Public radio
KQNY	91.9 FM	Quincy	Plumas Community Radio	Variety
KQOD	100.1 FM	Stockton	iHM Licenses, LLC	Rhythmic oldies
KQPM	105.9 FM	Ukiah	Bicoastal Media Licenses, LLC	Country
KQRU-LP	107.9 FM	Santa Clarita	White Fox Horse Rescue	Variety
KQSG-LP	101.5 FM	El Monte	The Emperor's Circle of Shen Yun	Ethnic/Chinese
KQTE	1450 AM	Helendale	Jeff Chang	Sports (ESPN)
KQVO	97.7 FM	Calexico	State of California, San Diego State University	Public radio
KRAB	106.1 FM	Greenacres	iHM Licenses, LLC	Alternative rock
KRAC	1370 AM	Red Bluff	Independence Rock Media, LLC	News/Talk
KRAJ	98.5 FM	Johannesburg	Adelman Broadcasting, Inc.	Rhythmic adult contemporary
KRAQ-LP	100.1 FM	Rancho Mirage	Cadena Radial Mision y Vision	Spanish religious
KRAY-FM	103.5 FM	Salinas	California Ortiz & 2 Media, LLC	Regional Mexican
KRAZ	105.9 FM	Santa Ynez	Knight Broadcasting, Inc.	Country
KRBH-LP	93.1 FM	Red Bluff	Red Bluff Joint Union High School District	Variety
KRBN	94.3 FM	Manton	Jab Broadcasting, LLC	Silent
KRBQ	102.1 FM	San Francisco	Audacy License, LLC	Classic hip hop
KRCB-FM	104.9 FM	Rohnert Park	Rural California Broadcasting Corporation	Public radio
KRCD	103.9 FM	Inglewood	Univision Radio Illinois, Inc.	Spanish contemporary hit radio
KRCG-FM	91.1 FM	Santa Rosa	Rural California Broadcasting Corp.	Public radio
KRCV	98.3 FM	West Covina	Univision Radio Illinois, Inc.	Spanish contemporary hit radio
KRCX-FM	99.9 FM	Marysville	Entravision Holdings, LLC	Regional Mexican
KRDA	92.1 FM	Clovis	Latino Media Network, LLC	Spanish Adult hits
KRDG	105.3 FM	Shingletown	SMG-Redding, LLC	Classic hits
KRDU	1130 AM	Dinuba	iHM Licenses, LLC	Christian radio
KRDW-LP	107.3 FM	Smith River	Calvary Chapel of the Redwoods	Christian radio
KRED	92.3 FM	Eureka	Bicoastal Media Licenses II, LLC	Country
KRFH-LP	105.1 FM	Arcata	Humboldt State University	Adult alternative
KRGR-LP	101.3 FM	Paradise	Golden Feather Ministries, Inc.	Christian radio (LifeTalk Radio)
KRHM-LP	103.5 FM	Bakersfield	Pentecostal Church of God, I.M. Iorpca	Spanish Christian
KRHQ	102.3 FM	Indio	R M Broadcasting L.L.C.	Classic rock
KRHV	93.3 FM	Big Pine	David A. And Maryann M. Digerness	Classic rock
KRJF-LP	92.3 FM	Santa Rosa	Redwood Justice Fund	Variety
KRJK	97.3 FM	Lamont	Buck Owens Production Company, Incorporated	Country
KRKC	1490 AM	King City	Dimes Media Corporation	Country
KRKC-FM	102.1 FM	King City	Dimes Media Corporation	Hot AC
KRLA	870 AM	Glendale	New Inspiration Broadcasting Company, Inc.	News/Talk
KRLT	93.9 FM	South Lake Tahoe	D&H Broadcasting LLC	Adult Top 40
KRML	1410 AM	Carmel	KRML Radio, LLC	Adult album alternative
KROJ-LP	101.5 FM	Panorama City	Ballet Folklorico Ollin	
KROP	1300 AM	Brawley	The Voice of International Christian Evangelism, Inc.	Christian radio
KROQ-FM	106.7 FM	Pasadena	Audacy License, LLC	Alternative rock
KROV	91.1 FM	Oroville	Bird Street Media Project	Variety
KRPU	1210 AM	Rocklin	DABAJ, LLC	Punjabi Music
KRQB	96.1 FM	San Jacinto	LBI Radio License LLC	Regional Mexican
KRQK	100.3 FM	Lompoc	AGM California, Inc.	Regional Mexican
KRQL-LP	104.7 FM	Santa Ana	Centro Cultural de Mexico en el Condado de Orange	Spanish Variety
KRQR	106.7 FM	Orland	Results Radio of Chico Licensee, LLC	Active rock
KRQZ	91.5 FM	Lompoc	Spirit Communications, Inc.	Christian Hits
KRRL	92.3 FM	Los Angeles	iHM Licenses, LLC	Urban contemporary
KRRS	1460 AM	Santa Rosa	Luna Foods, Inc.	Regional Mexican
KRRX	106.1 FM	Burney	SMG-Redding, LLC	Active rock
KRSF	89.3 FM	Ridgecrest	Radio 74 Internationale	Religious (Radio 74 Internationale)
KRSH	95.9 FM	Healdsburg	B.C. Radio LLC	Adult album alternative
KRTH	101.1 FM	Los Angeles	Audacy License, LLC	Classic hits
KRTM	88.1 FM	Banning	Penfold Communications, Inc.	Christian radio
KRTO	97.1 FM	Guadalupe	Emerald Wave Media	Bilingual rhythmic contemporary
KRUZ	103.3 FM	Santa Barbara	Cumulus Licensing, LLC	Classic hits
KRVC	98.9 FM	Hornbrook	Opus Broadcasting Systems, Inc.	Top 40/CHR
KRVH	91.5 FM	Rio Vista	River Delta Unified School District	Educational
KRVQ-FM	104.5 FM	Lake Isabella	Asha Faith James Company	Classic rock
KRVR	105.5 FM	Copperopolis	Threshold Communications	Classic hits
KRWI	98.1 FM	Wofford Heights	Rubin Broadcasting, Inc.	Hot adult contemporary
KRXA	540 AM	Carmel Valley	El Sembrador Ministries	Catholic Talk
KRXQ	98.5 FM	Sacramento	Audacy License, LLC	Mainstream rock
KRXV	98.1 FM	Yermo	Heftel Broadcasting Company LLC	Electronic dance music, Travelers info
KRYC-LP	105.9 FM	Yuba City	Irshad Ali Foundation	Rhythmic contemporary / Dance Hits
KRYI-LP	99.5 FM	Yuba City	Rhythm Foundation, Inc.	Variety
KRYZ-LP	98.5 FM	Mariposa	Mariposa Community Radio	Variety
KRZR	1400 AM	Visalia	iHM Licenses, LLC	Talk
KRZZ	93.3 FM	San Francisco	KRZZ Licensing, Inc.	Regional Mexican
KSAC	890 AM	Olivehurst	Lotus Sacramento Corp.	Ranchera
KSAC-FM	105.5 FM	Dunnigan	Caron Broadcasting, Inc.	Ranchera
KSAI	99.5 FM	Citrus Heights	Educational Media Foundation	Worship music (Air1)
KSAK	90.1 FM	Walnut	Mount San Antonio Community College District	Educational
KSAN	107.7 FM	San Mateo	Radio License Holding SRC LLC	Mainstream rock
KSBL	101.7 FM	Carpinteria	Rincon Broadcasting LS2 LLC	Adult contemporary
KSBQ	1480 AM	Santa Maria	Lazer Licenses, LLC	Regional Mexican
KSBR	88.5 FM	Mission Viejo	South Orange County Community College District	Adult album alternative
KSCA	101.9 FM	Glendale	Univision Radio Illinois, Inc.	Regional Mexican
KSCO	1080 AM	Santa Cruz	Zwerling Broadcasting System, Ltd	News/Talk
KSCU	103.3 FM	Santa Clara	Santa Clara University	Educational
KSDO	1130 AM	San Diego	Hi-Favor Broadcasting, LLC	Spanish Christian
KSDS	88.3 FM	San Diego	San Diego Community College District	Jazz
KSDW	88.9 FM	Temecula	Calvary Chapel of Costa Mesa, Inc.	Christian radio
KSEA	107.9 FM	Greenfield	Farmworker Educational Radio Network, Inc	Regional Mexican
KSEG	96.9 FM	Sacramento	Audacy License, LLC	Classic rock
KSEH	94.5 FM	Brawley	Entravision Holdings, LLC	Regional Mexican Adult Contemporary
KSEQ	97.1 FM	Visalia	Lotus Fresno Corp.	Rhythmic contemporary
KSES-FM	107.1 FM	Seaside	Entravision Holdings, LLC	Spanish AC
KSFB	1260 AM	San Francisco	Relevant Radio, Inc.	Catholic
KSFM	102.5 FM	Woodland	Audacy License, LLC	Rhythmic contemporary
KSFN	1510 AM	Piedmont	Lazer Licenses, LLC	Regional Mexican
KSFO	810 AM	San Francisco	Radio License Holdings LLC	Talk
KSFP-LP	102.5 FM	San Francisco	The San Francisco Public Press	
KSGG	104.7 FM	Soledad	Dimes Media Corporation	Spanish Classic hits
KSGN	89.7 FM	Riverside	Good News Radio	Contemporary Christian
KSGZ	98.7 FM	Greenfield	Lazer Licenses, LLC	Spanish Hits
KSHA	104.3 FM	Redding	SMG-Redding, LLC	Adult contemporary
KSJO	92.3 FM	San Jose	Silicon Valley Asian Media Group LLC	Bollywood music
KSJS	90.5 FM	San Jose	San Jose State University	Educational
KSJV	91.5 FM	Fresno	Radio Bilingue, Inc.	Spanish Talk/Standards
KSJX	1500 AM	San Jose	Multicultural Radio Broadcasting Licensee, LLC	Vietnamese
KSKS	93.7 FM	Fresno	Cumulus Licensing LLC	Country
KSLG-FM	93.1 FM	Arcata	Lost Coast Communications, Inc.	Alternative rock
KSLY	96.1 FM	San Luis Obispo	Educational Media Foundation	Contemporary Christian (K-Love)
KSMA	1240 AM	Santa Maria	AGM California, Inc.	News/Talk
KSMH	1620 AM	West Sacramento	Relevant Radio, Inc.	Catholic
KSMY	106.7 FM	Lompoc	Lazer Licenses, LLC	Spanish Adult hits
KSNI-FM	102.5 FM	Santa Maria	AGM California, Inc.	Country
KSOF	98.9 FM	Dinuba	iHM Licenses, LLC	Adult contemporary
KSOL	98.9 FM	San Francisco	Univision Radio San Francisco, Inc.	Regional Mexican
KSON	103.7 FM	San Diego	Audacy License, LLC	Country
KSPA	1510 AM	Ontario	Intelli LLC	Vietnamese
KSPB	91.9 FM	Pebble Beach	Robert Louis Stevenson School	Educational
KSPC	88.7 FM	Claremont	Pomona College	Educational
KSPE	94.5 FM	Ellwood	Rincon Broadcasting LS LLC	Spanish Oldies
KSPN	710 AM	Los Angeles	Good Karma Broadcasting, L.L.C.	Sports (ESPN)
KSQD	90.7 FM	Santa Cruz	Natural Bridges Media	Community Radio
KSQL	99.1 FM	Santa Cruz	Univision Radio San Francisco, Inc.	Regional Mexican
KSQQ	96.1 FM	Morgan Hill	Coyote Communications, Inc.	Portuguese
KSQT	89.7 FM	Prunedale	Natural Bridges Media	Variety
KSRH	88.1 FM	San Rafael	San Rafael High School	Educational
KSRN	107.7 FM	Kings Beach	Lazer Licenses, LLC	Regional Mexican
KSRO	1350 AM	Santa Rosa	Amaturo Sonoma Media Group, LLC	News/Talk
KSRT	107.1 FM	Cloverdale	Lazer Licenses, LLC	Regional Mexican
KSRW	92.5 FM	Independence	Benett Kessler II Trust, Benett Kessler Trustee	Alternative rock
KSRY	103.1 FM	Tehachapi	iHM Licenses, LLC	Alternative rock
KSSB	96.3 FM	Calipatria	Lazer Licenses, LLC	Regional Mexican
KSSC	107.1 FM	Ventura	Entravision Holdings, LLC	Spanish Adult hits
KSSD	107.1 FM	Fallbrook	Entravision Holdings, LLC	Spanish Adult hits
KSSE	107.1 FM	Arcadia	Entravision Holdings, LLC	Spanish Adult hits
KSSI	102.1 FM	China Lake	Sound Enterprises	Classic rock
KSSX	95.7 FM	Carlsbad	iHM Licenses, LLC	Rhythmic contemporary
KSTE	650 AM	Rancho Cordova	iHM Licenses, LLC	News/Talk
KSTG-LP	101.5 FM	Lodi	Lodi Christian Radio	Christian radio
KSTN	1420 AM	Stockton	KSTN, LLC	Country
KSTT-FM	104.5 FM	Atascadero	AGM California, Inc.	Adult contemporary
KSUE	1240 AM	Susanville	Sierra Broadcasting Corporation	News/Talk
KSVB-LP	94.1 FM	Big Bear City	Bear Valley Seniors and Veterans Assistance, Inc.	Variety
KSVG-LP	103.5 FM	Bakersfield	Bakersfield Community Radio	
KSVY	91.3 FM	Sonoma	Sonoma Valley Community Communications, Inc.	Variety
KSXA-LP	104.7 FM	Santa Ana	Latino Center for Prevention & Action in Health & Welfare	Variety
KSXY	100.9 FM	Calistoga	B.C. Radio LLC	Spanish CHR
KSYC-FM	103.9 FM	Yreka	Southern Oregon University	Public radio
KSYV	96.7 FM	Solvang	Knight Broadcasting, Inc.	Adult contemporary
KSZL	1230 AM	Barstow	Dos Costas Communications Corporation	Talk
KTAP	1600 AM	Santa Maria	Emerald Wave Media	Spanish Hits
KTCN	88.3 FM	Acton	Common Communications Southern California	Religious Teaching
KTCT	1050 AM	San Mateo	Radio License Holding SRC LLC	Sports (ESPN)
KTDE	100.5 FM	Gualala	The Tide Community Broadcasting, Inc.	Classic rock
KTEA	103.5 FM	Cambria	Adelman Broadcasting, Inc.	Classic hits
KTEH-LP	98.9 FM	Los Molinos	Northland Baptist Ministries International	Christian
KTGE	1570 AM	Salinas	Big Radio Pro, Inc.	Regional Mexican
KTGY-LP	107.9 FM	Nipomo	Central Coast Maintenance Assoc.	Variety
KTHU	100.7 FM	Corning	Results Radio of Chico Licensee, LLC	Classic rock
KTIE	590 AM	San Bernardino	Caron Broadcasting, Inc.	News/Talk
KTIP	1450 AM	Porterville	JA Ventures, Inc.	Rhythmic oldies
KTKE	101.5 FM	Truckee	Truckee Tahoe Radio, LLC	Adult album alternative
KTKZ	1380 AM	Sacramento	New Inspiration Broadcasting Company, Inc.	News/Talk
KTLW	88.9 FM	Lancaster	Educational Media Foundation	Worship music (Air1)
KTMQ	103.3 FM	Temecula	iHM Licenses, LLC	Classic rock
KTMS	990 AM	Santa Barbara	Rincon Broadcasting LS LLC	News/Talk
KTNK	1410 AM	Lompoc	Cross and Crown Broadcasting Corporation	Country
KTNQ	1020 AM	Los Angeles	Latino Media Network, LLC	Spanish Talk
KTNS	1060 AM	Oakhurst	Lazer Licenses, LLC	Regional Mexican
KTOM-FM	92.7 FM	Marina	iHM Licenses, LLC	Country
KTOR	99.7 FM	Gerber	Independence Rock Media, LLC	Regional Mexican
KTOX	1340 AM	Needles	Rubin Broadcasting, Inc.	News/Talk
KTPC-LP	99.1 FM	Venice	Reach for the Top, Inc.	Variety
KTPI	1340 AM	Mojave	RZ Radio LLC	News/Talk
KTPI-FM	97.7 FM	Mojave	RZ Radio LLC	Country
KTQX	90.1 FM	Bakersfield	Radio Bilingue, Inc.	Spanish Talk/Standards
KTRB	860 AM	San Francisco	New Inspiration Broadcasting Company, Inc.	Conservative talk
KTSE-FM	97.1 FM	Patterson	Entravision Holdings, LLC	Spanish Contemporary
KTWV	94.7 FM	Los Angeles	Audacy License, LLC	Rhythmic AC
KTYD	99.9 FM	Santa Barbara	Rincon Broadcasting LS LLC	Classic rock
KTYM	1460 AM	Inglewood	El Sembrador Ministries	Christian radio (Catholic)/Ethnic
KUAV-LP	105.1 FM	Winterhaven	Ah-Mut Pipa Foundation	Ethnic/Quechan
KUBA	1600 AM	Yuba City	Results Radio of Chico Licensee, LLC	Classic hits
KUBB	96.3 FM	Mariposa	SMG-Merced, LLC	Country
KUBO	88.7 FM	Calexico	Radio Bilingue, Inc.	Spanish Talk/Standards
KUBU-LP	96.5 FM	Sacramento	Sacramento Community Cable Foundation	Variety
KUCI	88.9 FM	Irvine	Regents of the University of California	Educational
KUCR	88.3 FM	Riverside	Regents of the University of California	Educational
KUDL	106.5 FM	Sacramento	Audacy License, LLC	Top 40/CHR
KUFW	106.3 FM	Kingsburg	Farmworker Educational Radio Network, Inc.	Regional Mexican
KUFX	98.5 FM	San Jose	Bonneville International Corporation	Country
KUHL	1440 AM	Santa Maria	Knight Broadcasting, Inc.	News/Talk
KUIC	95.3 FM	Vacaville	Alpha Media Licensee LLC	Adult contemporary
KUKI-FM	103.3 FM	Ukiah	Bicoastal Media Licenses, LLC	Country
KULV	97.1 FM	Ukiah	Educational Media Foundation	Contemporary Christian (K-Love)
KUNA-FM	96.7 FM	La Quinta	Gulf-California Broadcast Company	Regional Mexican
KUNK	92.7 FM	Mendocino	Rubin Broadcasting, Inc.	Adult contemporary
KUNX	1400 AM	Santa Paula	Gold Coast Broadcasting LLC	Spanish Talk
KUOP	91.3 FM	Stockton	California State University, Sacramento	Public radio
KUOR-FM	89.1 FM	Redlands	University of Redlands	Public radio
KUPV-LP	100.5 FM	Santa Rosa	City of Truth	Religious
KURS	1040 AM	San Diego	El Sembrador Ministries	Catholic (Spanish)
KUSC	91.5 FM	Los Angeles	University of Southern California	Classical
KUTM	92.7 FM	Kerman	Hispanic Target Media, Inc.	Regional Mexican
KUTY	1470 AM	Palmdale	High Desert Broadcasting, LLC	Regional Mexican
KUTZ-LP	103.1 FM	Sacramento	Midtown Radio	Variety
KUZZ	550 AM	Bakersfield	Buck Owens Production Company, Incorporated	Country
KUZZ-FM	107.9 FM	Bakersfield	Buck Owens Production Company, Incorporated	Country
KVBB-LP	94.5 FM	Big Bear Lake	Big Bear Theater, Inc.	Variety
KVCB-LP	100.9 FM	Vacaville	Vacaville Christian Schools	Variety
KVCR	91.9 FM	San Bernardino	San Bernardino Community College District	Public radio
KVEC	920 AM	San Luis Obispo	AGM California, Inc.	News/Talk
KVEN	1520 AM	Port Hueneme	Gold Coast Broadcasting LLC	Spanish Talk/Sports
KVGC	1340 AM	Jackson	Mother Lode Broadcasting	Classic hits
KVHH-LP	107.3 FM	Turlock	Christian Voice Ministries, Inc.	Contemporary Christian
KVHS	90.5 FM	Concord	Mt. Diablo Unified School District	Active rock
KVIB-LP	101.1 FM	San Diego	Positive Hope Inc.	
KVIN	920 AM	Ceres	Punjabi American Media, LLC	Punjabi
KVIP	540 AM	Redding	Pacific Cascade Communications Corp.	Christian radio
KVIP-FM	98.1 FM	Redding	Pacific Cascade Communications Corp.	Christian radio
KVLA-FM	90.3 FM	Coachella	Southern California Public Radio	Public radio
KVLI	1140 AM	Lake Isabella	Hill Broadcasting	News/Talk
KVMI	1270 AM	Tulare	Momentum Broadcasting LP	Adult contemporary
KVML	1450 AM	Sonora	Clarke Broadcasting Corporation	News/Talk
KVMR	89.5 FM	Nevada City	Nevada City Community Broadcast Group	Community radio
KVMX-FM	92.1 FM	Placerville	Lotus Sacramento Corp.	Ranchera
KVNR	1480 AM	Santa Ana	LBI Radio License LLC	Vietnamese
KVON	1440 AM	Napa	Wine Down Media LLC	Spanish variety
KVPM	95.7 FM	Arvin	SHEMOGUL Media, LLC	Urban contemporary
KVPR	89.3 FM	Fresno	White Ash Broadcasting, Inc.	Public radio
KVPW	97.7 FM	Mecca	Bankruptcy Estate of Major Market Radio LLC	Christian radio (VCY America)
KVRV	97.7 FM	Monte Rio	Amaturo Sonoma Media Group, LLC	Classic rock
KVRY-LP	99.5 FM	Santa Barbara	Calvary Chapel of Santa Barbara	Religious Teaching
KVSJ-FM	89.5 FM	Tracy	Peace and Justice Network of San Joaquin County	Public radio
KVSM	1380 AM	Santa Maria	Cristian Martinez	Regional Mexican
KVTA	1590 AM	Ventura	Gold Coast Broadcasting LLC	News/Talk
KVTO	1400 AM	Berkeley	Pham Radio Communication LLC	World Ethnic
KVTR	1590 AM	Victorville	Rudex Broadcasting Limited Corp.	Ranchero
KVUH	88.5 FM	Laytonville	Radio Bilingue, Inc.	Spanish Talk/Standards
KVVC-LP	106.5 FM	Vallejo	St. Vincent Ferrer Parish	Religious
KVVF	105.7 FM	Santa Clara	Univision Radio Illinois, Inc.	Spanish contemporary hit radio
KVVN	1430 AM	Santa Clara	Pham Radio Communication LLC	Vietnamese
KVVS	105.5 FM	Rosamond	iHM Licenses, LLC	Top 40/CHR
KVVZ	100.7 FM	San Rafael	Univision Radio Illinois, Inc.	Spanish contemporary hit radio
KVYA	91.5 FM	Cedarville	Openskyradio Corp.	Public radio
KVYB	106.3 FM	Oak View	Cumulus Licensing LLC	Rhythmic Contemporary
KVYN	99.3 FM	Saint Helena	Wine Down Media LLC	Adult album alternative
KWAC	1490 AM	Bakersfield	Lotus Bakersfield Corp.	Spanish Sports
KWAI	97.7 FM	Los Altos	Educational Media Foundation	Contemporary worship (Air 1)
KWAV	96.9 FM	Monterey	SMG-Monterey, LLC	Adult contemporary
KWBB-LP	105.5 FM	Big Bear Lake	Mountain Ministries	Christian radio
KWBP	90.3 FM	Big Pine	Cedar Broadcasting, Inc.	Religious
KWCA	101.1 FM	Palo Cedro	Southern Oregon University	Classical
KWCB-LP	94.7 FM	Wasco	Rosecorp Trust	Variety
KWCS-LP	105.9 FM	Sacramento	Women's Civic Improvement Club Of Sacramento, Inc.	Variety
KWDC-LP	93.5 FM	Stockton	San Joaquin Delta Community College District	Variety
KWDJ	1360 AM	Ridgecrest	Adelman Broadcasting, Inc.	Classic country
KWDJ-FM	100.9 FM	Johannesburg	Adelman Broadcasting, Inc.	Country
KWDO	105.5 FM	San Joaquin	One Putt	Classic country
KWFN	97.3 FM	San Diego	Audacy License, LLC	Sports (ISN)
KWG	1230 AM	Stockton	Relevant Radio, Inc.	Catholic
KWIE	101.3 FM	Hinkley	Point Five LLC	Rhythmic oldies
KWIN	97.7 FM	Lodi	Radio License Holding CBC, LLC	Urban contemporary
KWIZ	96.7 FM	Santa Ana	The Universal Church, Inc.	Spanish Christian
KWKW	1330 AM	Los Angeles	Lotus Los Angeles Corp.	Spanish Sports
KWLK	88.5 FM	Westwood	Calvary Chapel of Susanville	Christian radio
KWLU	98.9 FM	Chester	Educational Media Foundation	Contemporary Christian (K-Love)
KWLZ	99.3 FM	Shasta Lake City	SMG-Redding, LLC	Rhythmic contemporary
KWMR	90.5 FM	Point Reyes Station	KWMR, Inc.	Variety
KWNE	94.5 FM	Ukiah	Broadcasting Corp. of Mendocino County	Top 40/CHR
KWNN	98.3 FM	Turlock	Radio License Holding CBC, LLC	Urban contemporary
KWOH-LP	104.3 FM	Biola	Window of Heaven Ministry Network	Adult standards/Classic hits
KWOL-LP	103.7 FM	Arroyo Grande	Arroyo Grande Sda Church	Christian radio (LifeTalk Radio)
KWPT	100.3 FM	Fortuna	KWPT, Inc	Classic hits
KWQA-LP	94.5 FM	Chico	Chico Peace and Justice Center	Variety
KWQQ	1320 AM	Hemet	Rudex Broadcasting Limited Corp.	Adult Top 40
KWRM	1370 AM	Corona	EDI Media, Inc.	Regional Mexican/Chinese
KWRN	1550 AM	Apple Valley	Lazer Licenses, LLC	Regional Mexican
KWRS-LP	107.3 FM	Redlands	The Josiah Ministry	Christian
KWRU	1300 AM	Fresno	Punjabi American Media, LLC	Punjabi
KWST	1430 AM	El Centro	El Sembrador Ministries	Spanish Adult hits
KWSV-LP	99.1 FM	Simi Valley	Strategic International Ministries	Country
KWSW	980 AM	Eureka	Eureka Broadcasting Co., Inc.	Adult contemporary
KWSX	1280 AM	Stockton	iHM Licenses, LLC	News/Talk
KWTD	91.9 FM	Ridgecrest	Westside Christian Fellowship A.V.	Christian radio
KWTF	88.1 FM	Bodega Bay	KWTF Radio	Variety
KWTH	91.3 FM	Barstow	Advance Ministries, Inc.	Christian radio
KWTW	88.5 FM	Bishop	Westside Christian Fellowship A.V.	Christian radio
KWVE	1110 AM	Pasadena	Calvary Chapel of Costa Mesa, Inc.	Christian radio
KWVE-FM	107.9 FM	San Clemente	Calvary Chapel of Costa Mesa, Inc.	Christian radio
KWVF	102.7 FM	Guerneville	Amaturo Sonoma Media Group, LLC	Classic hits
KWWV	106.1 FM	Santa Margarita	Dimes Media Corporation	Rhythmic contemporary
KWXY	1340 AM	Cathedral City	IVox Radio LLC	Variety
KWXZ-LP	95.1 FM	Coachella	Raices Cultura	Variety
KWYE	101.1 FM	Fresno	Cumulus Licensing LLC	Hot AC
KWYL	102.9 FM	South Lake Tahoe	Radio License Holding CBC, LLC	Rhythmic contemporary
KXBX	1270 AM	Lakeport	Bicoastal Media Licenses, LLC	Classic hits
KXBX-FM	98.3 FM	Lakeport	Bicoastal Media Licenses, LLC	Adult contemporary
KXCM	96.3 FM	Joshua Tree	Copper Mountain Broadcasting Company	Country
KXCP-LP	97.1 FM	Palm Desert	Xavier College Preparatory High School	Christian
KXDZ	100.5 FM	Templeton	Dimes Media Corporation	Classic hits
KXEX	1550 AM	Fresno	Bendita Eucarista Radio, Inc.	Talk
KXFB-LP	99.5 FM	Fallbrook	Three Angels Global Networking, Inc.	Christian
KXFG	92.9 FM	Sun City	Audacy License, LLC	Country
KXFM	99.1 FM	Santa Maria	Point Ten LLC	Rhythmic oldies
KXGO	99.5 FM	Willow Creek	William W. McCutchen, III	Mainstream rock
KXJS	88.7 FM	Sutter	California State University, Sacramento	Classical
KXJZ	90.9 FM	Sacramento	California State University, Sacramento	Public radio
KXLM	102.9 FM	Oxnard	Lazer Licenses, LLC	Regional Mexican
KXLU	88.9 FM	Los Angeles	Loyola Marymount University	Educational
KXO	1230 AM	El Centro	KXO, Inc.	Oldies
KXO-FM	107.5 FM	El Centro	KXO, Inc.	Adult contemporary
KXOL-FM	96.3 FM	Los Angeles	KXOL Licensing, Inc.	Spanish CHR
KXPR	88.9 FM	Sacramento	California State University, Sacramento	Classical
KXRN-LP	104.7 FM	Laguna Beach	Laguna Radio, Inc.	Variety
KXRS	105.7 FM	Hemet	Lazer Licenses, LLC	Regional Mexican
KXSB	101.7 FM	Big Bear Lake	Lazer Licenses, LLC	Regional Mexican
KXSC	104.9 FM	Sunnyvale	University of Southern California	Classical
KXSE	104.3 FM	Davis	Entravision Holdings, LLC	Spanish adult hits
KXSF-LP	102.5 FM	San Francisco	San Francisco Community Radio, Inc.	Variety
KXSM	93.1 FM	Chualar	Lazer Licenses, LLC	Regional Mexican
KXSN	98.1 FM	San Diego	Audacy License, LLC	Classic hits
KXSR	91.7 FM	Groveland	California State University, Sacramento	Classical
KXTK	1280 AM	Arroyo Grande	Pacific Coast Media LLC	Sports (ESPN)
KXTS	98.7 FM	Geyserville	B.C. Radio LLC	Regional Mexican
KXTT	94.9 FM	Maricopa	Lazer Licenses, LLC	Spanish Adult hits
KXTZ	95.3 FM	Pismo Beach	Dimes Media Corporation	Classic hits
KXVV	103.1 FM	Victorville	EDB VV License LLC	Regional Mexican
KXWB	88.9 FM	Nipomo	Iglesia de Rios, El Cuerpo de Cristo	Spanish Talk
KXWS-LP	102.1 FM	Watsonville	Iglecia de Jesucristo, Israel, Inc	Regional Mexican
KXXZ	95.9 FM	Barstow	Dos Costas Communications Corp.	Regional Mexican
KXYS-LP	94.3 FM	Marysville	Yuba Sutter Community Media, Inc.	Catholic
KXZM	93.7 FM	Felton	Lazer Licenses, LLC	Regional Mexican
KYAA	1200 AM	Soquel	Relevant Radio, Inc.	Catholic
KYAD-LP	101.9 FM	Bakersfield	Council of Messianic Jewish Ministries International	Religious
KYBU	96.9 FM	Covelo	Friends of the Round Valley Public Library	Variety
KYCC	90.1 FM	Stockton	Your Christian Companion Network, Inc.	Christian radio
KYCT	92.7 FM	Shasta Lake	Independence Rock Media, LLC	Classic country
KYDO	96.1 FM	Campo	Educational Media Foundation	Worship music (Air1)
KYDS	91.5 FM	Sacramento	San Juan Unified School District	Educational
KYFC-LP	95.3 FM	El Centro	The Youth Foundation & Center of Imperial Valley, Inc.	Variety
KYGS-LP	105.5 FM	Nipomo	Santa Maria Valley Media Ministry	Silent
KYIX	104.9 FM	South Oroville	Butte Broadcasting Company, Inc.	Worship music (Air1)
KYKL	90.7 FM	Tracy	Educational Media Foundation	Contemporary Christian (K-Love)
KYLA	92.7 FM	Fountain Valley	Educational Media Foundation	Worship music (Air1)
KYLD	94.9 FM	San Francisco	iHM Licenses, LLC	Rhythmic contemporary
KYLO-LP	93.3 FM	Woodland	Holy Rosary Parish	Catholic
KYMX	96.1 FM	Sacramento	Bonneville International Corporation	Adult contemporary
KYNO	940 AM	Fresno	Fat Dawgs 7 Broadcasting, LLC	Oldies
KYNS	1340 AM	San Luis Obispo	Dimes Media Corporation	Classic country
KYOE	102.3 FM	Point Arena	Del Mar Trust	Classic country
KYOS	1480 AM	Merced	SMG-Merced, LLC	News/Talk
KYPA	1230 AM	Los Angeles	Woori Media Group, LLC	Korean
KYRR-LP	93.3 FM	Nevada City	Steven J. Michelsen Trust	Adult album alternative
KYRV	93.7 FM	Roseville	iHM Licenses, LLC	Classic hits
KYSR	98.7 FM	Los Angeles	iHM Licenses, LLC	Alternative rock
KYTO	96.1 FM	Shingletown	Results Radio of Redding Licensee, LLC	Oldies
KYTP-LP	104.5 FM	Galt	Iglesia Rosa de Saron	Christian
KYUA	88.5 FM	Inyokern	Educational Media Foundation	Worship music (Air1)
KYWS-LP	92.9 FM	West Sacramento	West Sacramento Neighbors Fair	Variety
KYXY	96.5 FM	San Diego	Audacy License, LLC	Adult contemporary
KYXZ-LP	107.9 FM	Arroyo Grande	United Way of San Luis Obispo County	Variety
KYZA	92.7 FM	Adelanto	Educational Media Foundation	Worship music (Air1)
KZAA-LP	96.5 FM	Santa Barbara	La Casa de la Raza	Variety
KZAP	96.7 FM	Paradise	Deer Creek Broadcasting, LLC	Classic hits
KZBV	91.3 FM	Carmel Valley	Aware FM, Inc.	Contemporary Christian
KZCF	91.5 FM	Atwater	Common Frequency, Inc.	Silent
KZCT	89.5 FM	Vallejo	Ozcat Entertainment	Variety
KZDG	1550 AM	San Francisco	Factorial Broadcasting, LLC	South Asian
KZER	1250 AM	Santa Barbara	Lazer Licenses, LLC	Regional Mexican
KZFR	90.1 FM	Chico	Golden Valley Community Broadcasters	Community radio
KZFX	93.7 FM	Ridgecrest	Post Rock Communications	Classic rock
KZHP-LP	93.3 FM	Sacramento	Process Theatre, Inc.	Rock/Blues
KZIQ-FM	92.7 FM	Ridgecrest	Adelman Broadcasting, Inc.	Hot adult contemporary
KZIS	107.9 FM	Sacramento	iHM Licenses, LLC	Hot adult contemporary
KZKA-LP	101.5 FM	Los Angeles	Los Angeles Academy of Arts and Enterprise	Variety
KZLA	98.3 FM	Riverdale	Huron Broadcasting, LLC	Rhythmic Oldies
KZLQ-LP	98.9 FM	La Quinta	Cadena Radial Remanente	Spanish religious
KZNB	1490 AM	Petaluma	Luna Foods, Inc.	Regional Mexican
KZNQ-LP	101.5 FM	Santa Clarita	Santa Clarita Public Service Broadcasters Corporation	Country
KZOZ	93.3 FM	San Luis Obispo	AGM California	Classic rock
KZRO	100.1 FM	Dunsmuir	Z-Channel Radio LLC	Classic hits
KZSB	1290 AM	Santa Barbara	Santa Barbara Broadcasting, Inc.	News/Talk
KZSC	88.1 FM	Santa Cruz	The Regents of the University of California	Educational
KZSF	1370 AM	San Jose	Carlos A. Duharte	Regional Mexican
KZSJ	1120 AM	San Martin	Bustos Media Holdings, LLC	Vietnamese
KZSQ-FM	92.7 FM	Sonora	Clarke Broadcasting Corporation	Classic hits
KZSR-LP	107.9 FM	Paso Robles	Pacific Coast Conservation Alliance	Variety
KZST	100.1 FM	Santa Rosa	Amaturo Sonoma Media Group, LLC	Adult contemporary
KZSU	90.1 FM	Stanford	The Board of Trustees of the Leland Stanford Junior University	Educational
KZSX-LP	95.7 FM	Cherry Valley	R Squared Broadcasting, Inc.	
KZSZ	107.5 FM	Colusa	Bustos Media Holdings, LLC	Spanish CHR
KZTZ	92.1 FM	Cottonwood	Bustos Media Holdings, LLC	
KZUT-LP	99.1 FM	Los Angeles	Machine Project	Variety
KZWS-LP	102.9 FM	Davis	Music Only Makes Sense	Variety
KZXY-FM	102.3 FM	Apple Valley	EDB VV License, LLC	Hot adult contemporary
KZYX	90.7 FM	Philo	Mendocino County Public Broadcasting	Public radio
KZYZ	91.5 FM	Willits	Mendocino County Public Broadcasting	Public radio
KZZH-LP	96.7 FM	Eureka	Access Humboldt	Variety
KZZO	100.5 FM	Sacramento	Bonneville International Corporation	Adult Top 40
WNKI578	1610 AM	Idyllwild	Idyllwild Fire Protection District	Emergency Information

== Defunct ==
- KAJI-LP
- KAVL
- KBPK
- KCOD
- KDAC
- KDBV
- KDDF
- KDHS-FM
- KDN - San Francisco
- KDND
- KESQ
- KFI-FM
- KFRJ
- KFXM-LP - Lancaster
- KGB - San Francisco
- KGIC-LP
- KGST
- KHBG-LP
- KHMJ
- KINC/KNYO/KESR - Independence
- KJJ
- KJQ - Stockton
- KKHP-LP
- KLSN-LP
- KLYD
- KMPS
- KMSJ-LP - Mount Shasta
- KNCR
- KOAD-LP
- KOHM
- KOWL
- KPRO
- KPSF
- KQPT-LP
- KQQH
- KRLY-LP
- KSBX
- KSFH
- KSKD
- KSMC
- KSUR
- KSYC
- KTHO
- KTMZ
- KUKI
- KUMI
- KVEN
- KVLP-LP
- KVQ
- KVVC
- KWTM
- KXPS
- KYJ - Los Angeles
- KYY - San Francisco
- KZAC
- KZKC
- KZM
- KZPE
- KZPO
- KZQT
- KZY
