= KADV =

KADV may refer to:

- KADV (FM), a radio station (89.1 FM) licensed to serve Garberville, California, United States
- KLXF, a radio station (90.5 FM) licensed to serve Modesto, California, which held the call sign KADV from 1987 to 2016
