= KFXM =

KFXM may refer to:

- KFXM-LP, a low-power radio station (94.1 FM) licensed to serve Cherry Valley, California, United States
- KFXM-LP (Lancaster, California), a defunct low-power radio station (98.3 FM) formerly licensed to serve Lancaster, California
- KTIE, a radio station (590 AM) licensed to serve San Bernardino, California, which held the call sign KFXM from 1929 to the late 1980s
- KTMQ, a radio station (103.3 FM) licensed to serve Temecula, California, which held the call sign KFXM from October 2000 to August 2001
