= Kogi =

Kogi State is a state in Nigeria.

Kogi may also refer to:

- Kogi people, people who live in the Sierra Nevada de Santa Marta in Colombia
- Kogi language, a Chibchan language of the Kogi people
- Kogi Korean BBQ, a truck-based restaurant in Los Angeles.
- Kogi Kaishakunin, the name for the position of the shōgun's executioner, in feudal Japan. This position was highlighted in the comics series Lone Wolf and Cub by the character Ittō Ogami.
- Pi Kogi Enavot, the thirteenth and last month in the Coptic calendar
- KOGI-LP, a low-power radio station (97.7 FM) licensed to serve Big Pine, California, United States
