= KTCN =

KTCN may refer to:

- KTCN (FM), a radio station (88.3 FM) licensed to serve Acton, California, United States
- KTLK (AM), a radio station (1130 AM) licensed to serve Minneapolis, Minnesota, United States, which held the call sign KTCN from 2011 to 2014
