= KBPT =

KBPT may refer to:

- Jack Brooks Regional Airport (ICAO code KBPT)
- KBPT-LP, a low-power radio station (96.1 FM) licensed to serve Bishop, California, United States
