= KLSN =

KLSN may refer to:

- the ICAO code for Los Banos Municipal Airport, in Los Banos, California, United States
- KLSN, a radio station (106.5 FM) licensed to Dishman, Washington
- KLSN-LP, a defunct low-power radio station (92.9 FM) formerly licensed to Oakley, California
- KYZA, a radio station (92.7 FM) licensed to Adelanto, California, which held the call sign KLSN from 2012 to 2013
- KZXL, a radio station (96.3 FM) licensed to Hudson, Texas, United States, which used the call sign KLSN from October 2001 to July 2008
