= KZSR =

KZSR may refer to:

- KZSR-LP, a low-power radio station (107.9 FM) licensed to serve Paso Robles, California, United States
- KQNU, a radio station (102.3 FM) licensed to serve Onawa, Iowa, United States, which held the call sign KZSR from 1998 to 2009
- KLRH, a radio station (92.9 FM) licensed to serve Reno, Nevada, United States, which held the call sign KZSR from 1990 to 1997
