= KWBP =

KWBP may refer to:

- KWBP (FM), a radio station (90.3 FM) licensed to serve Big Pine, California, United States
- KRCW-TV, a television station (channel 32) licensed to serve Salem, Oregon, United States, which held the call sign KWBP from 1995 to 2006
