= KVLP =

KVLP may refer to:

- KVLP (FM), a radio station (91.7 FM) licensed to Tucumcari, New Mexico, United States
- KVLP-LP, a defunct radio station (101.5 FM) formerly licensed to Visalia, California, United States
