= KDN =

KDN may refer to:

- Kilgore Daily News
- Naval Aircraft Modification Unit KDN Gorgon
- KDN (San Francisco), an AM radio station licensed from 1921 to 1923
