= KNTO =

Radio station in Chowchilla, California

- Chowchilla, California; United States
- Frequency: 93.3 MHz
- Branding: La Exitosa 93.3

Programming
- Language: Spanish
- Format: Regional Mexican

Ownership
- Owner: Centro Cristiano Amistad Church

History
- Former call signs: KXDA (1990–1994); KLVN (1994–1998); KSKD-FM (1998–2002)

Technical information
- Licensing authority: FCC
- Facility ID: 18858
- Class: A
- ERP: 2,950 watts
- HAAT: 102 meters (335 ft)
- Transmitter coordinates: 37°13′02″N 120°11′56″W
- Translator: 103.7 K279AM (Turlock)

Links
- Public license information: Public file; LMS

KNTO (93.3 FM) is a radio station broadcasting a Regional Mexican format. Licensed to Chowchilla, California, United States, the station is currently owned by Centro Cristiano Amistad Church. KNTO simulcasts KCFA.

== History ==
The station was assigned the call letters KXDA on July 12, 1990. The station went on air in late 1992 or early 1993, and the Educational Media Foundation moved to acquire the remainder of the station under an option it held to do so within 90 days of starting broadcasting; it had owned 49 percent of the licensee, Venture Broadcasting. On October 3, 1994, the station changed its call sign to KLVN; on September 19, 1998, to KSKD-FM; and on February 14, 2002, to the current KNTO.

In 2021, Centro Cristiano Amistad Church acquired KNTO and KCFA (106.1 FM) in Arnold from La Favorita Radio Network for $1.8 million.
