= KNCR =

Radio station in Fortuna, California

- Fortuna, California; United States
- Broadcast area: Eureka, California
- Frequency: 1090 kHz

Ownership
- Owner: Del Rosario Talpa, Inc.

History
- First air date: November 1966
- Last air date: December 1, 2020
- Former call signs: KIXF (1966–1969); KNCR (1969–1992); KAJK (1992–1999)
- Former frequencies: 1280 kHz (1966–1969)
- Call sign meaning: "North Coast Radio"

Technical information
- Facility ID: 39472
- Class: D
- Power: 10,000 watts (days only)
- Transmitter coordinates: 40°33′30″N 124°7′24″W

KNCR (1090 AM) was a daytime-only radio station licensed to Fortuna, California, United States, and served the Eureka area. The station was last owned by Del Rosario Talpa, Inc. and carried a Regional Mexican format known as "La Nueva 1090, Puro México".

KNCR went silent on December 1, 2020, for financial reasons; the license was canceled on December 2, 2021, for failure to broadcast in the last 12 months and failure to file a license renewal application.

== History ==
On May 20, 1965, Dale A. Owens filed a construction permit for a new daytime-only station to broadcast with 1,000 watts on 1280 kHz at Fortuna, which the Federal Communications Commission (FCC) granted on April 20, 1966. Broadcasts of the new station, KIXF, began in November of that year.

In 1967, the station was approved to go to 5,000 watts; two years later, KIXF moved to 1090 kHz at 10,000 watts, making it the state's most powerful outlet north of San Francisco. When the frequency change became effective in June 1969, KIXF became KNCR.

Never a financial success in its early history, KNCR was sold twice in its first decade of operation, to FGK, Inc. in 1971 and C&M Enterprises in 1974. KNCR adopted an "inspirational" Christian format in 1976 after simulcasting KFMI (96.3 FM). This later rolled back to a full-service adult contemporary outlet, which lasted until the station flipped to country as KAJK "KJAK" in October 1992; this format was simulcast with a new radio station on the FM band, KAJK-FM 99.1.

KAJK-AM-FM, having since shifted to adult contemporary, was sold for $450,000 by Keith Allgood to Miller Broadcasting Company in 1998. The new owners restored the KNCR call letters the next year. Del Rosario Talpa acquired the outlet in 2004.

Under Del Rosario Talpa's ownership, the station—airing a Spanish-language format known as "La Nueva 1090"—financially struggled and faced several regulatory issues. In 2005, KNCR was evicted on short notice from its longtime tower site and moved transmission to studios at Smith Lane without filing for an authorization to do so; this resulted in a $3,200 fine being assessed in 2007. It failed to pay FCC regulatory fees for 2007, 2008, and 2012 through 2016; this led to the issuance of an order to pay in 2020, seeking more than $14,000 in debt to the commission. The station went silent on December 1, 2020, with the application for special temporary authority noting "lost tower site and financial hardship". It never returned to air and was canceled on December 2, 2021, for two concurrent reasons: failure to resume broadcasting and failure to file an application for license renewal.
