= KRAY-FM =

Radio station in Salinas, California

- Salinas, California; United States
- Broadcast area: Santa Cruz, California
- Frequency: 103.5 MHz
- Branding: La Buena 103.5 FM

Programming
- Format: Regional Mexican

Ownership
- Owner: California Ortiz & 2 Media; (California Ortiz & 2 Media, LLC)
- Sister stations: KMJV

Technical information
- Licensing authority: FCC
- Facility ID: 33754
- Class: A
- ERP: 2,500 watts
- HAAT: 156 meters (512 ft)
- Transmitter coordinates: 36°40′20″N 121°31′31.7″W
- Translator: 103.3 K277AH (Watsonville)

Links
- Public license information: Public file; LMS
- Website: labuenasalinas.com

KRAY-FM (103.5 FM) is a radio station broadcasting a Regional Mexican format. Licensed to Salinas, California, United States, it serves the Santa Cruz area. The station is currently owned by CO2 Media.
