= KTNS =

Simulcasts KMEN, Mendota, CA
- Oakhurst, California; United States
- Broadcast area: Fresno area
- Frequency: 1060 kHz
- Branding: La Mexicana 100.5 y 1060 AM

Programming
- Format: Regional Mexican

Ownership
- Owner: Lazer Media; (Lazer Licenses, LLC)
- Sister stations: KAAT

History
- First air date: November 20, 1982
- Former frequencies: 1090 kHz (1982–2002)

Technical information
- Licensing authority: FCC
- Facility ID: 8338
- Class: D
- Power: 5,000 watts (day); 23 watts (night)
- Transmitter coordinates: 37°17′45.8″N 119°36′26.5″W

Links
- Public license information: Public file; LMS
- Webcast: Listen live
- Website: lamexicanaradio.net/fresno

KTNS (1060 AM) is a radio station broadcasting Regional Mexican music. Licensed to Oakhurst, California, United States, the station serves the Fresno area. The station is owned by Lazer Media.

KTNS was a 1,000 watt daytime only station on 1090 kHz. In 2002, the owner purchased the license of a station on 1060 kHz in Chico, California, and turned it into the U.S. Federal Communications Commission. That cleared the way for KTNS to move there, operate with higher power, and stay on the air 24 hours a day.
