= KKBN =

- Twain Harte, California; United States
- Broadcast area: Sonora, California
- Frequency: 93.5 MHz
- Branding: Today's Country 93.5

Programming
- Format: Country
- Affiliations: Westwood One

Ownership
- Owner: Clarke Broadcasting Corporation
- Sister stations: KVML, KZSQ-FM

Technical information
- Licensing authority: FCC
- Facility ID: 11977
- Class: A
- ERP: 400 watts
- HAAT: 384.7 meters (1,262 ft)
- Transmitter coordinates: 38°0′30″N 120°21′44″W

Links
- Public license information: Public file; LMS
- Website: kkbn.com

KKBN (93.5 FM, "The Cabin") has been a radio station since 1986, broadcasting a country music format since March 2000. Licensed to Twain Harte, California, United States, the station serves the greater Mother Lode area comprising Tuolumne and Calaveras Counties with a combined population of approximately 110,000. The station is currently owned by Clarke Broadcasting Corporation.
