= KZSQ-FM =

- Sonora, California; United States
- Frequency: 92.7 MHz
- Branding: The New Star 92.7

Programming
- Format: Classic hits

Ownership
- Owner: Clarke Broadcasting Corporation
- Sister stations: KKBN, KVML

History
- First air date: October 3, 1973

Technical information
- Licensing authority: FCC
- Facility ID: 11708
- Class: A
- ERP: 380 watts
- HAAT: 393 meters (1,289 ft)
- Transmitter coordinates: 38°0′30″N 120°21′44″W

Links
- Public license information: Public file; LMS
- Website: kzsq.com

KZSQ-FM (92.7 FM, "The New Star 92.7 FM") is a radio station licensed to Sonora, California. KZSQ serves Mother Lode country centered in Sonora, comprising Tuolumne and Calaveras County. The station broadcasts a classic hits format and is owned by Clarke Broadcasting Corporation.

KZSQ-FM has been broadcasting in the Mother Lode since 1971. In February, 1994, KZSQ-FM and KVML updated to digital studios and relocated to downtown Sonora. In 2000, Clarke Broadcasting acquired a local Internet Service Provider, Mother Lode Internet, and created a community website, myMotherLode.com, for its three radio stations KVML/KZSQ-FM/KKBN. Mother Lode Internet was sold by Clarke Broadcasting in 2008, while retaining the myMotherLode.com with more than 2 million page views per month. myMotherLode.com continues to promote and represent Star 92.7/KZSQ which does not stream all radio content but media feature segments are available on myMotherLode.com and KZSQ.com.

Clarke Broadcasting Corporation is a Nevada corporation, President H. Randolph Holder, Jr. The General Manager of KVML / KZSQ-FM / KKBN / myMotherlode.com is Tom Nankival.

== History ==
On May 27, 2022 at 2 p.m., KZSQ-FM flipped its format from adult contemporary to classic hits, with music primarily from the top 40 music charts of the 60s to early 2000s, with a focus on the 80s, and has been branded as "The New Star 92.7".
