= KSKD =

Radio station in Livingston, California

- Livingston, California; United States
- Broadcast area: Merced, California
- Frequency: 95.9 MHz

Ownership
- Owner: KSKD, Inc.

History
- First air date: 1981
- Last air date: March 20, 2020
- Former call signs: KNTO (1981–2002)

Technical information
- Facility ID: 1009
- Class: A
- ERP: 3,000 watts
- HAAT: 93 meters (305 ft)
- Transmitter coordinates: 37°18′57″N 120°43′20″W

KSKD (95.9 FM) was a radio station broadcasting a Regional Mexican music format. Licensed to Livingston, California, United States, the station served the Merced area. The station was last owned by KSKD, Inc.

== History ==
The station was assigned the call letters KNTO on October 26, 1981. On February 14, 2002, the station changed its call sign to the KSKD. The license for the station was cancelled on March 20, 2020.
