= KAAT (FM) =

Radio station in Oakhurst, California

- Oakhurst, California; United States
- Broadcast area: Fresno, California
- Frequency: 103.1 MHz
- Branding: Radio Lazer 103.1 FM

Programming
- Format: Regional Mexican

Ownership
- Owner: Lazer Media; (Lazer Licenses, LLC)
- Sister stations: KTNS

Technical information
- Licensing authority: FCC
- Facility ID: 8341
- Class: B1
- ERP: 25,000 watts
- HAAT: −59 meters (−194 ft)
- Transmitter coordinates: 37°27′9.7″N 119°37′57.5″W
- Translators: 94.7 K234BP (Auberry); 104.3 K282AE (Oakhurst); 106.1 K291AY (North Fork)
- Repeater: 103.1 KAAT-FM1 (Merced)

Links
- Public license information: Public file; LMS
- Webcast: Listen live
- Website: radiolazer.com/fresno

KAAT (103.1 FM) is a radio station broadcasting a Regional Mexican format. The station is licensed to Oakhurst, California and serves the Fresno area. KAAT also has an FM booster in Merced, California, with the call sign KAAT-FM1. The station is currently owned by Lazer Media.
