= KOWL =

Radio station in South Lake Tahoe, California

- South Lake Tahoe, California; United States
- Broadcast area: Lake Tahoe
- Frequency: 1490 kHz
- Branding: NewsTalk 1490AM

Programming
- Format: Talk radio
- Affiliations: CBS News Radio

Ownership
- Owner: Rothschild Broadcasting LLC
- Sister stations: KRLT

History
- First air date: November 1956
- Last air date: 2026

Technical information
- Licensing authority: FCC
- Facility ID: 55493
- Class: C
- Power: 1,000 watts (unlimited)
- Transmitter coordinates: 38°56′33.7″N 119°57′28.6″W

Links
- Public license information: Public file; LMS

KOWL (1490 AM, "NewsTalk 1490AM") was a radio station licensed to South Lake Tahoe, California, United States. The station, established in 1956, was owned by Rothschild Broadcasting LLC. KOWL had broadcast a talk radio format including local news, local talk, hourly updates from CBS News Radio, and a number of nationally syndicated radio shows.

== History ==
=== The beginning ===
This station signed on in November 1956, broadcasting with 250 watts of power on a frequency of 1490 kHz, and licensed to serve the community of Bijou, California. The new station was assigned the KOWL call sign by the Federal Communications Commission. KOWL owner Robert Burdette also served as the station's first general manager and program director.

Although the station was licensed to serve Bijou, California, KOWL's later radio studios were located inside the Harrah's Stateline Club, a casino in Stateline, Nevada. The station's original transmitter, a Gates BC-250L "Hi-Watter" AM transmitter, and broadcast tower were installed roughly two miles south of the casino in South Lake Tahoe, California. The original Gates transmitter now resides at the Western Historic Radio Museum in Virginia City, Nevada.

=== New ownership ===
Barely 18 months after it launched, Burdette sold KOWL to Tahoe Broadcasters, Inc., in May 1958. Ed Frech took the reins as president with John J. Murphy as general manager.

Just five years later, Tahoe Broadcasters, Inc., sold the station to a new company called KOWL, Inc., in a transaction that was consummated on June 1, 1963. The new owners applied for and, in late 1963, received a construction permit to upgrade their daytime signal to 1,000 watts while leaving the nighttime signal at 250 watts. In 1968, the station's application for a change in city of license was granted. This placed the city of license as the same community where the transmitter shack and broadcast tower had been located all along: South Lake Tahoe, California.

KOWL broadcast a middle of the road music format through much of the 1970s with a number of hours taken each week for country & western. By 1978, the format was a blend of MOR and progressive country, thanks to the influence of the Bakersfield sound. In 1979, KOWL, Inc., sold the station to John and Kathleen Parker, Jeanette Merillat and Edward J. Pulaski who formed Pacific Communications, Inc.

=== The 1980s ===
In 1983, the station was sold to David Isenberg who formed Isenberg Media Corporation. In the following year, KOWL moved its offices and studios from Harrah's Tahoe to the Tahoe Keys Marina in South Lake Tahoe, California.

In April 1989, Isenberg Media Corporation, through owner David H. Isenberg, reached an agreement to transfer the broadcast license for KOWL to Regency Communications Limited Partnership, of which Isenberg was a member. The shift was approved by the FCC on June 12, 1989. Regency also acquired competitor KRLT (93.9 FM). Isenberg left the partnership group entirely on September 10, 1990.

=== The 1990s ===
In February 1993, the members of the Regency Communications Limited Partnership applied to the FCC to transfer the KOWL broadcast license to Park Lane Regency Radio, Inc. The transfer was approved by the FCC on June 7, 1993. In August 1998, Park Lane Regency Radio, Inc., applied to shift control of KOWL to a new holding company called Regent Licensee of South Lake Tahoe, Inc. The transfer was approved by the FCC on August 13, 1998, and the transaction was consummated on February 10, 1999.

Just a few months later, in July 1999, Regent Communications subsidiary Regent Licensee of South Lake Tahoe, Inc., reached an agreement to sell KOWL to Commonwealth License Subsidiary, LLC, a wholly owned subsidiary of Commonwealth Communications LLC (Dex Allen, principal). The deal, which also included FM sister station KRLT, was valued at a combined sale price of $1.25 million. The deal was approved by the FCC on August 27, 1999, and the transaction was consummated on November 5, 1999.

=== KOWL today ===
In October 2003, Commonwealth Communications, LLC, announced an agreement to sell the stations to Cherry Creek Radio (Joseph D. Schwartz, CEO) holding company CCR-Lake Tahoe IV, LLC, as part of a 24-station deal valued at a reported $41 million. The deal was approved by the FCC on December 19, 2003, and the transaction was consummated on February 3, 2004. At the time of the sale, the station aired a news/talk/sports radio format.

KOWL and sister station KRLT were sold by Cherry Creek Radio to D&H Broadcasting LLC effective June 30, 2015; the purchase price for the transaction was $650,000.

It was announced on 11 August 2015, that KOWL was dropping Rush Limbaugh due to his show "repelling advertisers".

In May 2024, D&H Broadcasting LLC filed for Chapter 11 bankruptcy, blaming the COVID-19 pandemic eliminating its revenue by 80% as part of the decision, as well as failing to reach a $100,000 GoFundMe fundraising goal. On September 16, Rothschild Broadcasting LLC acquired KOWL and KRLT for $275,000.

The Federal Communications Commission cancelled the station's license on September 23, 2026.

== History of call letters ==
The call letters KOWL were previously assigned to an AM station (later KDAY and KBLA) in Santa Monica, California.
