= KRLT =

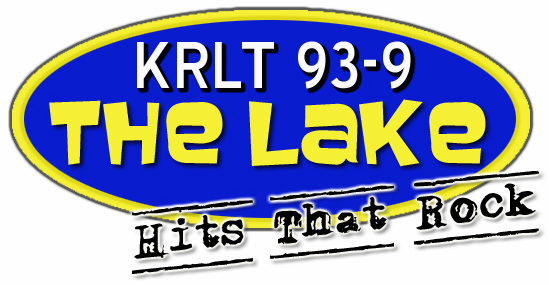
- South Lake Tahoe, California; United States
- Broadcast area: Lake Tahoe
- Frequency: 93.9 MHz
- Branding: 93-9 The Lake

Programming
- Format: Adult Top 40

Ownership
- Owner: Rothschild Broadcasting LLC

History
- First air date: March 7, 1974
- Call sign meaning: "Rock Lake Tahoe"

Technical information
- Licensing authority: FCC
- Facility ID: 55494
- Class: A
- ERP: 3,000 watts
- HAAT: −53 meters (−174 ft)
- Transmitter coordinates: 38°57′38″N 119°56′32″W

Links
- Public license information: Public file; LMS
- Website: krltradio.com

KRLT (93.9 FM) is a radio station broadcasting a hot adult contemporary format, branded as 93-9 The Lake. Licensed to South Lake Tahoe, California, United States, it serves the Lake Tahoe area. The station is owned by Rothschild Broadcasting, LLC.

In May 2024, D&H Broadcasting LLC filed for Chapter 11 bankruptcy, blaming the COVID-19 pandemic eliminating its revenue by 80% as part of the decision, as well as failing to reach a $100,000 GoFundMe fundraising goal. On September 16, 2024, Rothschild Broadcasting LLC acquired KRLT and KOWL for $275,000.
