= KCBX =

- San Luis Obispo, California; United States
- Broadcast area: San Luis Obispo, California; KNBX: Monterey County, California
- Frequency: 90.1 MHz (HD Radio)
- Branding: Central Coast Public Radio

Programming
- Format: Public radio
- Affiliations: NPR

Ownership
- Owner: KCBX Public Radio

History
- First air date: July 27, 1975; 50 years ago

Technical information
- Licensing authority: FCC
- Facility ID: 33705
- Class: B
- ERP: 5,300 watts
- HAAT: 433 meters (1,421 ft)
- Transmitter coordinates: 35.360°N 120.656°W
- Translator: See § Translators
- Repeater: See § Repeaters

Links
- Public license information: Public file; LMS
- Webcast: Listen live
- Website: www.kcbx.org

KCBX (90.1 FM) is a non-commercial radio station that is licensed to San Luis Obispo, California. The public radio station is a member station of NPR and airs a wide variety of programming, including All Things Considered, Democracy Now!, and jazz and classical music.

KCBX has a network of repeaters and translators that enable the station to be heard throughout the Central Coast of California. Full-power repeater is KNBX (91.7 FM), licensed to San Ardo, California.

KCBX itself broadcasts in HD Radio.

== History ==
KCBX first signed on July 27, 1975 and began airing a variety of NPR programming, plus jazz, classical music, and foreign-language shows.

KSBX, a full-power repeater of KCBX in Santa Barbara, began broadcasting April 1, 2003.

From the 1970s through the end of 2012, KCBX broadcast live meetings of the San Luis Obispo County Board of Supervisors. In its decision to drop coverage of meetings, the station cited a lack of interest in the radio broadcast as county residents can stream meetings online.

== Repeaters ==
KCBX operates two full-power repeater stations: KSBX on 89.5 MHz in Santa Barbara, California and KNBX on 91.7 MHz in Monterey County. The station also operates several low-power FM translators scattered throughout the Central Coast. KSBX was shut down on December 31, 2022, with KCBX citing that tropospheric ducting had brought in unacceptable interference from KPBS-FM in San Diego, an issue it had tried and failed to address through a failed relocation to 89.9 FM. The KSBX license was surrendered and cancelled on February 13, 2023.

Call sign	Frequency	City of license	Facility ID	Class	ERP (W)	Height (m (ft))	First air date
KNBX	91.7 FM (HD)	San Ardo, California	51720	B	3,000	532.9 meters (1,748 ft)	January 21, 2001

=== Translators ===
Call sign	Frequency (MHz)	City of license	Facility ID	Class	Power (W)	Rebroadcasts
K215AH	90.9	Avila Beach, California	33699	D	250	KCBX
K215AF	90.9	Cambria, California	33701	D	13	KCBX
K216AG	91.1	Cayucos, California	33700	D	38	KCBX
K236AF	95.1	Lompoc, California	83032	D	10	KCBX
K215AG	90.9	Solvang, California	33703	D	10	KCBX

== KPBS-FM interference problem in Santa Barbara ==
In parts of the Santa Barbara area, sometimes during atmospheric ducting, co-channel KPBS-FM in San Diego can override or interfere with the KSBX signal. At one time, KSBX was a 9-watt translator on 89.9 MHz; later, another station began using that translator. Eventually a deal was reached that would vacate that frequency. In 2006, KCBX applied for a Federal Communications Commission (FCC) construction permit to move back to 89.9 MHz and increase the effective radiated power from 50 watts to 350 watts. As part of the application, the station enclosed copies of numerous letters and emails from listeners complaining about the signal override or interference from KPBS. In support of the frequency change, a consulting broadcast engineer was hired to analyze the situation, make signal strength measurements during ducting, and fully explain the technical causes of the problem to the FCC. Making the interference problem worse is the fact that the KPBS signal travels completely over water.

In 2010, KPBS-FM was granted a construction permit to increase its effective radiated power from 2,700 watts to 26,000 watts. The consulting engineer explained to the FCC that if KSBX's frequency change was not granted, this would worsen the interference problem. In February 2012, the FCC dismissed the construction permit application from KCBX. KPBS started broadcasting with the new 26,000 watt signal on October 1, 2012.

KCBX announced on December 20, 2022, that it would close down KSBX by the end of the year, stating that climate change had increased the ducting and its related interference.
