= KCJZ =

- Cambria, California; United States
- Broadcast area: San Luis Obispo County, California
- Frequency: 105.3 MHz
- Branding: 105.3 Bob FM

Programming
- Format: Variety hits

Ownership
- Owner: Robert Adelman; (Adelman Broadcasting, Inc.)
- Sister stations: KTEA

History
- First air date: 2013

Technical information
- Licensing authority: FCC
- Facility ID: 183345
- Class: A
- ERP: 6,000 watts
- HAAT: 52 meters (171 ft)
- Transmitter coordinates: 35°31′28″N 121°03′39″W

Links
- Public license information: Public file; LMS
- Website: bobfm1053.com

KCJZ (105.3 FM, "Bob FM") is a commercial radio station licensed to Cambria, California, United States, and serves San Luis Obispo County. The station is owned by Robert Adelman, through licensee Adelman Broadcasting, Inc., and airs a variety hits format.

== History ==
KCJZ began broadcasting in 2013. In June 2014, Adelman Investments adopted a variety hits format for the station with the branding "Bob FM".

On November 9, 2022, Jason Adelman's Adelman Investments, LLC transferred KCJZ's license to Robert Adelman's Adelman Broadcasting, Inc.
