= KLMM =

Radio station in Oceano, California

- Oceano, California; United States
- Broadcast area: San Luis Obispo, California
- Frequency: 94.1 MHz
- Branding: Radio Lazer 94.1 FM

Programming
- Language: Spanish
- Format: Regional Mexican

Ownership
- Owner: Lazer Media; (Lazer Licenses, LLC)

History
- First air date: September 1997
- Former call signs: KAGR (1994–1997); KBZK (1997–1999)
- Call sign meaning: La Maquina Musical (former branding)

Technical information
- Licensing authority: FCC
- Facility ID: 46401
- Class: A
- ERP: 340 watts
- HAAT: 418 meters (1,371 ft)
- Transmitter coordinates: 34°53′52″N 120°35′21″W

Links
- Public license information: Public file; LMS
- Website: radiolazer.com/santa-maria-san-luis-obispo

KLMM (94.1 FM) is a commercial radio station licensed to Oceano, California, United States, and serves the San Luis Obispo area. The station is owned by Lazer Media and broadcasts a regional Mexican format.

== History ==
The station first signed on in September 1997 as KBZK and originally was licensed to Morro Bay, California. It was owned by Sarape Communications Inc., headed by Andrew James Fakas, and broadcast an adult contemporary music format. In November 1998, Sarape Communications sold KBZK and sister station KBZX (103.1 FM) in Paso Robles to Moon Broadcasting Paso Robles LLC, a Los Angeles–based ownership group led by Abel A. de Luna, for $750,000. At the time, KBZX was simulcasting KBZK's AC format. The following April, the new owner broke the simulcast and flipped each station to separate Spanish-language programming; KBZK became KLMM, a regional Mexican music outlet branded as "La Maquina Musical". In June 2000, Oxnard-based Lazer Broadcasting purchased KLMM and its Paso Robles sister station, now called KLUN, from Moon Broadcasting for $1.15 million.
