= KTEA =

- Cambria, California; United States
- Broadcast area: San Luis Obispo County, California
- Frequency: 103.5 MHz
- Branding: K-Tea 103.5

Programming
- Format: Soft classic hits
- Affiliations: SRN Radio News

Ownership
- Owner: Robert Adelman; (Adelman Broadcasting, Inc.)
- Sister stations: KCJZ

History
- First air date: November 9, 2003
- Former call signs: KTEA (2002–2012); KMGQ (2012–2012)
- Call sign meaning: Sounds like "Katy", granddaughter of original owner James Kampschroer

Technical information
- Licensing authority: FCC
- Facility ID: 77773
- Class: A
- Power: 6,000 watts
- HAAT: 98.3 meters (323 ft)
- Transmitter coordinates: 35°31′26.10″N 121°03′40.30″W

Links
- Public license information: Public file; LMS
- Website: 1035ktea.com

KTEA (103.5 FM) is a commercial radio station licensed to Cambria, California, United States, and serves San Luis Obispo County. The station is owned by Adelman Broadcasting and broadcasts a Soft classic hits format.

== History ==
KTEA first signed on November 9, 2003, with a big band/adult standards music format. The station was originally owned by James Robert Kampschroer. He chose the call sign KTEA because phonetically it resembles the name of his granddaughter Katy, who was born the same day the Federal Communications Commission (FCC) granted the station's license—July 18 of that year.

On August 27, 2012, KTEA flipped to soft adult contemporary with the branding "Magic 103.5", as Kampschroer leased the station to Post Rock Communications. The call sign changed to KMGQ. Less than two months later, Kampschroer re-assumed control of his station and restored the previous standards format. The station's call letters reverted to KTEA on November 20, 2012.

On March 31, 2014, Kampschroer sold KTEA to Robert Adelman's Adelman Broadcasting, Inc. for $200,000. On June 6, 2015, KTEA shifted its format from oldies to classic hits.
