= KLUN =

Radio station in Paso Robles, California

Coordinates: 35.646°N 120.739°W

- Paso Robles, California; United States
- Broadcast area: San Luis Obispo, California
- Frequency: 103.1 MHz
- Branding: Radio Lazer 103.1 FM

Programming
- Language: Spanish
- Format: Regional Mexican

Ownership
- Owner: Lazer Media; (Lazer Licenses, LLC)

History
- First air date: August 1995; 30 years ago
- Former call signs: KTBG (1992–1995); KNCR-FM (1995–1997); KBZX (1997–1999)

Technical information
- Licensing authority: FCC
- Facility ID: 2243
- Class: A
- ERP: 1,100 watts
- HAAT: 232 meters (761 ft)

Links
- Public license information: Public file; LMS
- Webcast: Listen Live
- Website: Radio Lazer Santa Maria-San Luis Obispo

KLUN (103.1 FM) is a commercial radio station that is licensed to Paso Robles, California, and serves the San Luis Obispo, California, area. The station is owned by Lazer Media and airs a regional Mexican music format.

== History ==
The station first signed on in August 1995 as KNCR-FM with an adult contemporary (AC) music format. It was launched by Andy J. Fakas, who purchased the station's Federal Communications Commission (FCC) construction permit from original holder Jean Yang in 1993. On August 22, 1997, Sarape Communications Inc., headed by Fakas, changed the call sign of KNCR-FM to KBZX. The station was also simulcast on sister station KZBK (94.1 FM) in Oceano, California.

In November 1998, Sarape Communications sold KBZX and KBZK to Moon Broadcasting Paso Robles LLC, a Los Angeles–based ownership group led by Abel A. de Luna, for $750,000. The following April, the new owner ended the simulcast and flipped each station to separate Spanish-language formats. KBZX changed its call sign to KLUN and adopted a Spanish AC format branded as "Radio Tequila". In June 2000, Lazer Broadcasting purchased KLUN and its sister station, now called KLMM, from Moon Broadcasting for $1.15 million.
