= KMDR =

- McKinleyville, California; United States
- Broadcast area: Humboldt County, California
- Frequency: 95.1 MHz (HD Radio)
- Branding: 95.1 The Beat

Programming
- Format: Rhythmic oldies
- Subchannels: HD2: 106.7 The Edge (Rock)

Ownership
- Owner: Mad River Radio, Inc.
- Sister stations: KJNY

History
- First air date: 2010

Technical information
- Licensing authority: FCC
- Facility ID: 170994
- Class: C3
- ERP: 2,300 watts
- HAAT: 326.1 meters (1,070 ft)
- Transmitter coordinates: 40°49′32″N 124°0′5″W
- Translator: HD2: 106.7 K294AZ (Eureka)
- Repeater: 95.1 KMDR-FM1 (Fortuna)

Links
- Public license information: Public file; LMS
- Webcast: Listen Live
- Website: 1067theedgefm.com (HD2)

KMDR (95.1 FM) is a radio station airing a rhythmic oldies format licensed to McKinleyville, California. The station is owned by Mad River Radio, Inc.

Previous logo
