= KVML =

- Sonora, California; United States
- Frequency: 1450 kHz

Programming
- Format: News-Talk
- Affiliations: ABC News Radio; Fox News Radio; Compass Media Networks; Premiere Networks; Westwood One

Ownership
- Owner: Clarke Broadcasting Corporation
- Sister stations: KKBN, KZSQ-FM

Technical information
- Licensing authority: FCC
- Facility ID: 11711
- Class: C
- Power: 940 watts unlimited
- Transmitter coordinates: 38°0′29.7″N 120°21′47.7″W
- Translator: 102.7 K274CG (Sonora)

Links
- Public license information: Public file; LMS
- Website: kvml.com

KVML (1450 AM) is a radio station licensed to Sonora, California. The station broadcasts a News-Talk format and is owned by Clarke Broadcasting Corporation.

AM 1450 KVML is the Mother Lode’s oldest radio station dating back to 1949 when it signed on with the call letters KROG, adopting the KVML call letters in 1961.

KVML uses the slogan, “The Mother Lode’s News Station”. The original transmitter location tower and studio buildings are located along Old Mono way just west of Sanguinetti road. They moved to Racetrack Road in the mid 1970s.

Through the 1970s and most of the 1980s, the station broadcast a country music format billing itself as "Continuous Country KVML" and featured such notable radio personalities as Perry Van Houten, Tom DeAtilo and Rob Kavanaugh.

After years of broadcasting from their location on Racetrack Road the station moved in February, 1994, along with sister station KZSQ to downtown Sonora and updated to digital studios.

In 2000 Clarke Broadcasting acquired a local Internet service provider, Mother Lode Internet, and created a community website, myMotherLode.com, for its three radio stations KVML/KZSQ/KKBN. Mother Lode Internet was sold by Clarke Broadcasting in 2008, while retaining the myMotherLode.com with more than 500,000 visitors a month and 2 million page views. myMotherLode.com continues to promote and represent AM 1450 KVML which does not stream all radio content but media feature segments are available on myMotherLode.com.

In 2013 when communities were evacuated due to the Rim Fire KVML and myMotherLode.com were a vital and official source for local information. KVML provided constant community updates and coverage and its sister stations broadcast vital community fire report meetings.

Clarke Broadcasting Corporation is a Nevada corporation, President H. Randolph Holder, Jr. who inherited the radio station from his father.
