= KMJV =

Radio station in Soledad, California

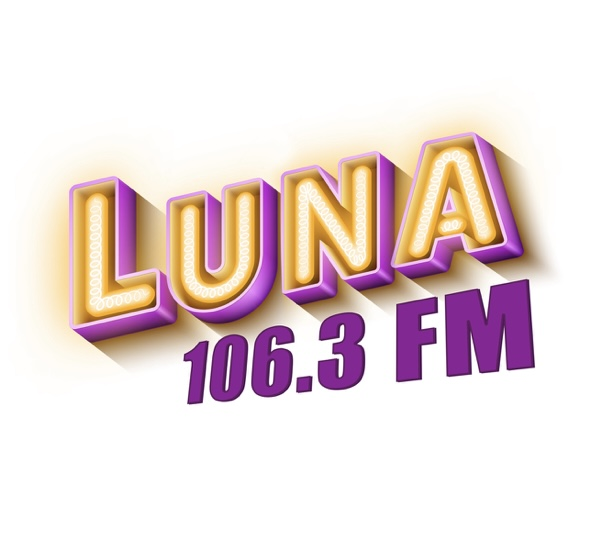
- Soledad, California; United States
- Broadcast area: Monterey Bay
- Frequency: 106.3 MHz
- Branding: Luna 106.3

Programming
- Language: Spanish
- Format: Adult contemporary

Ownership
- Owner: California Ortiz & 2 Media, LLC
- Sister stations: KRAY

Technical information
- Licensing authority: FCC
- Facility ID: 54968
- Class: A
- ERP: 4,700 watts
- HAAT: 113.0 meters (370.7 ft)
- Transmitter coordinates: 36°16′26.8″N 121°16′18.7″W

Links
- Public license information: Public file; LMS
- Website: luna1063.com

KMJV (106.3 FM, "Luna") is a radio station broadcasting a Spanish AC music format. Licensed to Soledad, California, United States, the station is currently owned by California Ortiz & 2 Media, LLC.
