= KARM =

Radio station in Visalia, California

- Visalia, California; United States
- Broadcast area: Visalia - Tulare - Hanford
- Frequency: 89.7 MHz

Programming
- Format: Contemporary inspirational

Ownership
- Owner: Harvest Broadcasting Company, Inc.

History
- First air date: 1980

Technical information
- Licensing authority: FCC
- Facility ID: 26360
- Class: B1
- ERP: 1,000 watts
- HAAT: 247 meters (810 ft)
- Transmitter coordinates: 36°38′10″N 118°56′32″W

Links
- Public license information: Public file; LMS
- Website: MyPromiseFM.com

KARM (89.7 FM "Promise FM"), is a non-commercial radio station licensed to Visalia, California, United States, and serves the Central California communities of Visalia, Tulare and Hanford. Owned by Harvest Broadcasting Company, Inc., it features a Contemporary Inspirational format. The studios are on South Woodland Drive in Visalia.

== History ==
The station signed on the air in 1980. It has always had a Christian radio format.

Until 2016, KARM's programming was simulcast in Modesto and the San Joaquin Valley via its former sister station, KADV.

The KARM call sign was once used for a station broadcasting on 1430 AM as Fresno's ABC Radio Network affiliate in the 1950s and 1960s. At that time it was the second-oldest AM station in the Fresno market, after KMJ 580 AM. The original KARM got its start on 1310 kHz with 100 watts in 1938. It is now sports radio KFIG.
