= KJNY =

Coordinates: 40.501°N 124.287°W

- Ferndale, California; United States
- Broadcast area: Eureka, California
- Frequency: 99.1 MHz
- Branding: 99-1 KISS-FM

Programming
- Format: Top 40 (CHR)
- Affiliations: Premiere Networks

Ownership
- Owner: Mad River Radio, Inc.
- Sister stations: KMDR

History
- First air date: 1989 (as KWHZ-FM)
- Former call signs: KWHZ-FM (1988–1992); KAJK (/1992-10/1992); KAJK-FM (1992–2006)
- Call sign meaning: Station branded as Jenny from 2006–2011

Technical information
- Licensing authority: FCC
- Facility ID: 39505
- Class: C1
- ERP: 6,000 watts
- HAAT: 523 meters

Links
- Public license information: Public file; LMS
- Webcast: Listen Live
- Website: 991kissfm.com

KJNY (99.1 FM) is a commercial radio station in Ferndale, California, broadcasting to the Eureka, California, area. It airs a Mainstream Top 40/CHR format billed as "99-1 KISS-FM." Prior to that, it partially aired a country music format as Jenny 99.1 until it adopted the "KISS" branding and went Top 40 full-time on April 8, 2011.
