= KBPT-LP =

- Bishop, California; United States
- Frequency: 96.1 MHz

Programming
- Format: Community
- Affiliations: Koahnic Broadcast Corporation

Ownership
- Owner: Bishop Paiute Tribe

History
- First air date: May 29, 2015

Technical information
- Licensing authority: FCC
- Facility ID: 196243
- Class: L1
- ERP: 100 watts
- HAAT: −115 meters (−377 ft)
- Transmitter coordinates: 37°22′06.00″N 118°25′10.10″W

Links
- Public license information: LMS
- Webcast: Listen live
- Website: kbptradio.com

KBPT-LP is a low-power community radio station in Bishop, California. It is owned by Bishop Paiute Tribe. The station is a member of the National Federation of Community Broadcasters.

== History ==
KBPT-LP began broadcasting on May 29, 2016.

== See also ==
- KOGI-LP: Paiute station in Big Pine, California
