= KCFA =

- Arnold, California; United States
- Broadcast area: Sacramento, California
- Frequency: 106.1 MHz
- Branding: La Exitosa

Programming
- Format: Regional Mexican

Ownership
- Owner: Centro Christiano Amistad Church

Technical information
- Licensing authority: FCC
- Facility ID: 9995
- Class: B1
- ERP: 3,800 watts
- HAAT: 257.0 meters (843.2 ft)
- Transmitter coordinates: 38°22′40″N 120°11′33″W

Links
- Public license information: Public file; LMS
- Website: lafavorita.net

KCFA (106.1 FM) is a radio station broadcasting a Regional Mexican format. Licensed to Arnold, California, United States, the station is currently owned by Centro Christiano Amistad Church.

== Current issues with the signal coverage ==
The station's signal can be heard as far westward as the cities of Fairfield and Vacaville, California which is beyond its target coverage area. It fights with and obstructs the signal of KMEL, an FM radio station based in San Francisco operating under the same frequency, throughout the cities of Fairfield and some of Vacaville.

The same is true for the Altamont Pass leaving the city of Livermore, California traveling eastward. As soon as the Altamont Pass is reached, KCFA's signal cuts off KMEL's signal.

KCFA has a powerful, unobstructed signal in both the cities of Sacramento, California, and Stockton, California. It is one of two stations (KGRB 94.3 FM is the other) that serves both the Sacramento and Stockton/Modesto radio markets at the same time.
