= KLXF =

K-Love radio station in Modesto, California, United States

- Modesto, California; United States
- Broadcast area: Central Valley
- Frequency: 90.5 MHz (HD Radio)

Programming
- Format: Contemporary Christian
- Subchannels: HD2: Air1; HD3: K-Love Eras; HD4: Radio Nueva Vida
- Network: K-Love

Ownership
- Owner: Educational Media Foundation

History
- First air date: 1989
- Former call signs: KADV (1987–2016)

Technical information
- Licensing authority: FCC
- Facility ID: 43333
- Class: A
- ERP: 1,500 watts
- HAAT: 38 meters (125 ft)
- Transmitter coordinates: 37°36′28″N 120°57′27″W
- Translators: 99.5 K258AB (Modesto); 101.9 K270BE (Modesto); HD4: 102.9 K275CE (Patterson)

Links
- Public license information: Public file; LMS
- Webcast: Listen live
- Website: klove.com

KLXF (90.5 FM) is a non-commercial radio station licensed to Modesto, California, United States. Formerly a full-time satellite of KARM in Visalia, the station is now the Modesto, CA affiliate of EMF's K-Love Christian Music network. It was previously owned by Central Valley Christian Academy, a Seventh-Day Adventist institution, but was operated by KARM owner Harvest Broadcasting under a local marketing agreement.

== History ==
This station received its original construction permit from the Federal Communications Commission on July 6, 1987. The new station was assigned the KADV call sign by the FCC on August 26, 1987. KADV received its license to cover from the FCC on June 6, 1989.

KADV aired a religious radio format. However, in 2011, due to financial concerns, Central Valley Christian Academy agreed to turn over KADV's operations to KARM, which is also owned by Adventist interests, under an LMA.

On November 18, 2016, Central Valley Christian Academy sold KADV to Educational Media Foundation for $225,000. On November 22, 2016, KADV changed their call letters to KLXF and on December 1, changed their format to EMF's K-Love contemporary Christian format.
