= KFXM-LP =

- Cherry Valley, California; United States
- Broadcast area: Cherry Valley-Beaumont-Inland Empire
- Frequency: 94.1 MHz
- Branding: KFXM – Big FM Country

Programming
- Format: Classic country

Ownership
- Owner: Urban Ingenuity, Inc.

History
- First air date: February 29, 2024; 2 years ago

Technical information
- Licensing authority: FCC
- ERP: 100 watts

Links
- Public license information: LMS
- Website: kfxm.us

KFXM-LP (94.1 FM) is a low-power FM radio station in Cherry Valley, California, broadcasting Classic Country Favorites from the 1950s, '60s, '70s, '80s, and '90s and educational programming. KFXM-LP is licensed to serve Cherry Valley, California, United States, and went on the air February 29, 2024.

KFXM-LP is the first station to be fully licensed in the United States in the 2023 FCC filing window. The station is operated by Urban Ingenuity, Inc, a federal nonprofit 501(c)(3) organization. The station was fully licensed and went on the air on February 29, 2024. Prior to April 2023, the KFXM call sign was assigned to an unrelated radio organization operated for nearly 10 years by the late Chris Compton in Lancaster, CA. The station went off the air due to the death of Compton at Compton's request in his will.

The original KFXM was in Beaumont, Texas, for nearly six years, and then KFXM (now KTIE). In San Bernardino, KFXM 590 AM was a popular, number one rated, top 40 station on the AM band from 1959 to 1985. In 1959, a sister to 590 AM, KFXM 95.1 FM, went on the air and simulcast with 590 AM, but was turned off because very few people listened to the FM band at the time. In 1974, 95.1 FM returned to the airwaves, under different ownership as KQLH.

The KFXM call sign also had a three-year home at 103.3 FM in Temecula, California.

The current KFXM-LP is the brainchild of Mark Westwood, who is also general manager of KCAA 1050 AM, Loma Linda, an NBC Radio News Affiliate, and is an employee of Broadcast Management. Mark Westwood is an LPFM and community radio advocate, and has been involved with the founding and construction of numerous broadcast stations.
