= KOGI-LP =

Radio station in Big Pine, California

- Big Pine, California; United States
- Frequency: 97.7 MHz

Ownership
- Owner: Big Pine Paiute Tribe of the Owens Valley

History
- First air date: September 16, 2014

Technical information
- Licensing authority: FCC
- Facility ID: 192753
- Class: L1
- ERP: 100 watts
- HAAT: −255.8 meters (−839 ft)
- Transmitter coordinates: 37°09′08.33″N 118°16′55.43″W

Links
- Public license information: LMS

KOGI-LP is a low power radio station broadcasting out of Big Pine, California. It is licensed to the Big Pine Paiute Tribe of the Owens Valley.

== History ==
KOGI-LP began broadcasting on September 16, 2014.

== See also ==
- KBPT-LP: Paiute station in Bishop, California
