= KLSN-LP =

- Oakley, California; United States
- Broadcast area: East Contra Costa County
- Frequency: 92.9 MHz

Ownership
- Owner: Friends of Oakley Community Foundation

History
- First air date: January 28, 2017
- Last air date: January 21, 2019

Technical information
- Facility ID: 194303
- ERP: 58 watts
- HAAT: 40 meters (130 ft)
- Transmitter coordinates: 37°58′1.88″N 121°45′0.67″W

Links
- Website: klsn.org

KLSN-LP (92.9 FM) was a low-power FM radio station licensed to Oakley, California, United States, that served East Contra Costa County. KLSN-LP went on the air officially on January 28, 2017, with a classic hits format. In addition to music, KLSN-LP broadcast local sports from area high schools.

== History ==
KLSN-LP began broadcasting on January 28, 2017; much of the equipment had been bought used from KUSP in Santa Cruz, which had been sold and converted to a K-Love transmitter, or had been donated. However, it would run into legal problems from the outset of its operation, primarily concerning the use of its tower site. After a year of operation, on January 31, 2018, KLSN-LP went off the air. This revealed that KLSN-LP had been installed at its transmitter site, on Vista Grande Drive in Antioch, even though it had not received approval from the tower owner to use the site; the general manager, Chris Ponsano, alleged he had a gentleman's verbal agreement with the mayor of Antioch for use of the facility.

The case prompted chief engineer Jeff Brown to sue the general manager and the licensee, Friends of Oakley Community Foundation; the lawsuit demanded monetary damages and the return of equipment that he had loaned to the station. In filing for special temporary authority to remain silent, Friends of Oakley told the Federal Communications Commission that it had suffered vandalism at its studio and transmitter, losing the hard drives that contained its broadcast material and other equipment.

The station claimed to broadcast again for eight days in January 2019, but it filed to go silent thereafter. After not having broadcast in 12 months, the FCC automatically canceled the license on February 5, 2020, per Section 312(g) of the Communications Act.
