= KEBF-LP =

- Morro Bay, California; United States
- Frequency: 97.3 MHz
- Branding: The Rock

Programming
- Language: English
- Format: Community radio

Ownership
- Owner: Estero Bay Community Radio

History
- First air date: April 8, 2014

Technical information
- Licensing authority: FCC
- Facility ID: 190768
- Class: L1
- ERP: 100 watts
- HAAT: −72.7 meters (−239 ft)
- Transmitter coordinates: 35°22′46″N 120°51′33″W

Links
- Public license information: LMS
- Website: esterobayradio.org

KEBF-LP (97.3 FM) is a low power radio station broadcasting a community radio format, licensed to Morro Bay, California, United States.

== History ==
KEBF-LP began broadcasting on April 8, 2014.

Estero Bay Community Radio, AKA 97.3 The Rock, is a 501(c)(3) non-profit organization started by radio veteran Hal Abrams in December 2011. KEBF became licensed in March 2014, hitting the air in April 2014. The Rock is operated and supported by listeners and residents of Morro Bay, Los Osos and Cayucos, California. An all volunteer staff of 53 air-talents delivers diverse programming 24 hours a day at 97.3 FM in Morro Bay and KZSR-LP 107.9 FM in Paso Robles, and online at EsteroBayRadio.org. The station, originally licensed to the City of Morro Bay, is now licensed to Estero Bay Community Radio. The purchase price was $1.00.

The station is an affiliate of the syndicated Pink Floyd program "Floydian Slip."
