= Mass media in Sacramento, California =

The following is a list of media outlets—including print, radio, television and the internet—located in Sacramento, California, United States.

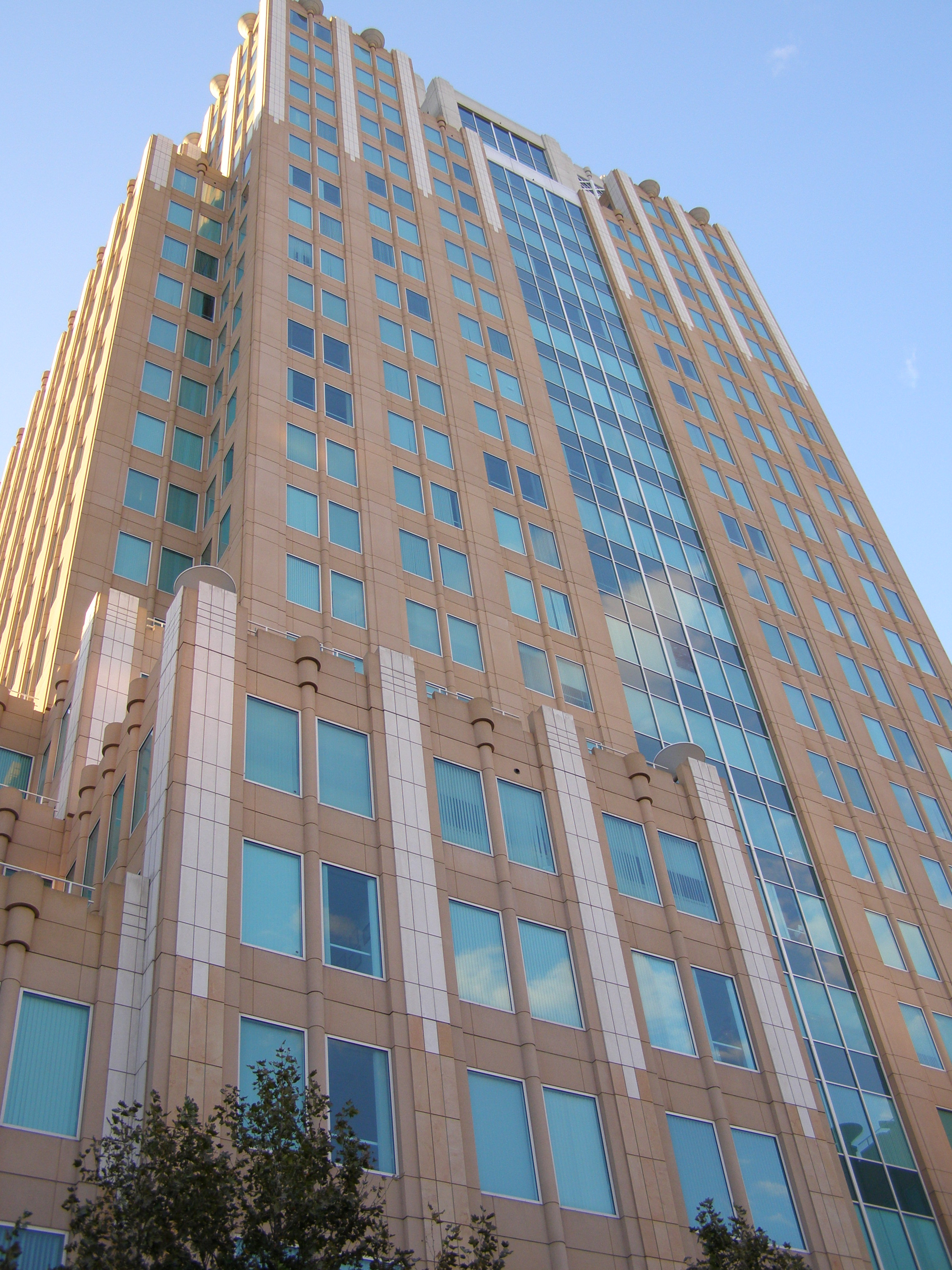
Park Tower, Downtown Sacramento

== Print ==
=== Magazines ===
- Comstock's
- Government Technology Magazine
- Sacramento Magazine (defunct)
- Sactown Magazine

=== Newspapers ===
Top two newspapers

- The Sacramento Bee, the primary newspaper, was founded in 1857 by James McClatchy. The Sacramento Bee is the flagship paper of The McClatchy Company, the second-largest newspaper publisher in the United States. The Sacramento Bee has won five Pulitzer Prizes in its history and numerous other awards, including many for its progressive public service campaigns promoting free speech (the Bee often criticized government policy, and uncovered many scandals hurting Californians), anti-racism (the Bee supported the Union during the American Civil War and later publicly denounced the Ku Klux Klan), worker's rights (the Bee has a strong history of supporting unionization), and environmental protection (leading numerous tree-planting campaigns and fighting against environmental destruction in the Sierra Nevada).
- The Sacramento Union, the Sacramento Bee's rival, started publishing six years earlier, in 1851; it closed its doors in 1994, with an attempted revival lasting from 2005 to 2009. Writer and journalist Mark Twain wrote for the Union in 1866.

Other newspapers

- Sacramento Business Journal
- Sacramento News & Review
- The Sacramento Observer

== Radio ==
Currently, radio stations that primarily serve Sacramento include:

=== AM ===
- 650 KSTE Rancho Cordova (Conservative talk)
- 710 KFIA Carmichael (Christian)
- 770 KCBC Manteca (Christian)
- 830 KNCO Grass Valley (Talk radio)
- 890 KSAC Olivehurst (Sports - FSR)
- 950 KAHI Auburn (Urban gospel)
- 990 KATD Pittsburg (Spanish talk radio)
- 1110 KLIB Roseville (Asian radio)
- 1140 KHTK Sacramento (Sports - Infinity)
- 1210 KRPU Rocklin (Asian radio)
- 1240 KCVV Sacramento (Spanish Christian)
- 1320 KIFM West Sacramento (Sports - ESPN)
- 1380 KTKZ Sacramento (Conservative talk)
- 1430 KJAY Sacramento (World music)
- 1470 KIID Sacramento (Punjabi/full-service)
- 1530 KFBK Sacramento (Talk radio) (Note: Clear-channel station)
- 1570 KCVR Lodi (Punjabi/full-service)
- 1620 KSMH West Sacramento (Catholic - Relevant Radio)**
- 1690 KFSG Roseville (Spanish Christian/ethnic)

=== FM ===
- 88.1 KEBR Sacramento (Christian - Family Radio)**
- 88.9 KXPR Sacramento (Public/classical)**
- 89.3 KCAI Stockton (Christian contemporary - Air1)**
- 89.3 KQEI North Highlands (NPR)**
- 89.7 KLRS Lodi (Christian contemporary - K-Love)**
- 90.1 KYCC Stockton (Christian music)**
- 90.3 KDVS Davis (College/University of California, Davis)**
- 90.9 KXJZ Sacramento (NPR)**
- 91.5 KYDS Sacramento (Campus/variety/El Camino Fundamental High School)**
- 92.1 KVMX-FM Placerville (Regional Mexican)
- 92.5 KBEB Sacramento (Adult contemporary)
- 93.1 KFBK-FM Pollock Pines (Talk radio)
- 93.7 KYRV Roseville (Classic rock)
- 94.3 KGRB Jackson (Regional Mexican)
- 94.7 KKDO Fair Oaks (Alternative)
- 95.3 KUIC Vacaville (Hot AC)
- 96.1 KYMX Sacramento (Adult contemporary)
- 96.9 KSEG Sacramento (Classic rock)
- 97.9 KLMG Esparto (Spanish hits)
- 98.5 KRXQ Sacramento (Mainstream rock)
- 99.5 KSAI Citrus Heights (Christian contemporary - Air1)**
- 99.9 KRCX-FM Marysville (Regional Mexican)
- 100.5 KZZO Sacramento (Hot AC)
- 101.1 KHYL Auburn (Classic hip-hop)
- 101.5 KCCL Woodland (Regional Mexican)
- 101.9 KHHM Shingle Springs (Spanish hits)
- 102.5 KSFM Woodland (Mainstream urban)
- 103.5 KNTY Sacramento (Classic country)
- 103.9 KLVB Lincoln (Christian contemporary - K-Love)**
- 104.1 KHKK Modesto (Classic rock)
- 104.3 KXSE Davis (Spanish hits)
- 105.1 KNCI Sacramento (Country)
- 105.5 KSAC-FM Dunnigan (Regional Mexican)
- 106.5 KUDL Sacramento (Contemporary hits)
- 107.9 KZIS Sacramento (Hot AC)

=== LPFM ===
- 92.9 KYWS-LP West Sacramento (Community/variety)**
- 93.3 KZHP-LP Sacramento (Adult album alternative)**
- 97.5 KDEE-LP Sacramento (Community/urban contemporary)**
- 98.9 KBQS-LP Sacramento (Community/multinational)**

(**) — indicates a non-commercial educational station.

== Television ==
The following television stations are licensed to cities in the Sacramento area:

=== Full-power ===
- 3 KCRA-TV Sacramento (NBC)
- 6 KVIE Sacramento (PBS)
- 10 KXTV Sacramento (ABC)
- 13 KOVR Stockton (CBS)*
- 16 KEDS Colusa (Religious independent)
- 19 KUVS-DT Modesto (Univision)*
- 23 KBSV Ceres (Independent)
- 29 KSPX-TV Sacramento (Ion Television)*
- 31 KMAX-TV Sacramento (Independent)
- 40 KTXL Sacramento (Fox)
- 58 KQCA Stockton (The CW and MyNetworkTV)
- 64 KTFK-DT Stockton (UniMás)*

=== Low-power ===
- 8 KBTV-CD Sacramento (Buzzr)
- 11 K11XS-D Modesto
- 15 KEFM-LD Sacramento
- 20 K20OO-D Ceres
- 27 K20JX-D Sacramento (Good News TV)
- 32 KSTV-LD Sacramento (AltaVision)
- 32 KFKK-LD Stockton
- 33 KCSO-LD Sacramento (Telemundo)*
- 34 KACA-LD Modesto (Daystar)*
- 38 K04QR-D Esparto
- 38 KBIS-LD Turlock
- 43 KAHC-LD Sacramento
- 44 KRJR-LD Sacramento (Daystar)*
- 45 KFTY-LD Middletown
- 47 KFMS-LD Sacramento
- 49 KSAO-LD Sacramento
- 49 K12XJ-D Modesto
- 51 KMSX-LD Sacramento (IBN Television)

(*) - indicates channel is a network owned-and-operated station.
