= KVIN =

- Ceres, California; United States
- Broadcast area: Modesto-Stockton
- Frequency: 920 kHz
- Branding: Punjabi Radio USA

Programming
- Language: Punjabi
- Format: Talk and music

Ownership
- Owner: Balwinder Kaur Khalsa and Dilpreet Singh Khalsa; (Punjabi American Media LLC)
- Sister stations: KLOK; KIID; KOBO; KWRU; KLHC; KCVR

History
- First air date: October 17, 1963
- Former call signs: KLOC (1963–2003)
- Call sign meaning: The Vine (previous format)

Technical information
- Licensing authority: FCC
- Facility ID: 12062
- Class: B
- Power: 500 watts (day); 2,500 watts (night)
- Transmitter coordinates: 37°35′48.7″N 121°4′18.8″W (day); 37°37′54.8″N 120°45′9.7″W (night)
- Translators: 92.3 K222BX (Modesto); 107.1 K296HL (Manteca)

Links
- Public license information: Public file; LMS
- Webcast: Listen live
- Website: punjabiradiousa.com

KVIN (920 AM, "Punjabi Radio USA 920 AM") is a commercial radio station licensed to Ceres, California, United States, and serving the Stockton and Modesto markets. Owned by Balwinder Kaur Khalsa and Kilpreet Singh Khalsa, through licensee Punjabi American Media LLC, the station carries a format of Punjabi language talk and Punjabi music.

KVIN has two separate transmitter sites: the daytime facility is sited off of Iowa Avenue in Riverdale Park and the nighttime facility is sited off Hickman Road in Hickman. KVIN also has two FM translator stations rebroadcasting its programming: 92.3 K222BX in Modesto and 107.1 K296HL in Manteca.

== History ==
The station first signed on the air on September 15, 1963, as KLOC. It was founded by country music artist Chester Smith, who served as general manager. The station was a daytimer, required to go off the air from sunset to sunrise. Reflecting its owner, KLOC played only country and western music.

The station was acquired by Threshold Communications in 2001 for $400,000. The call sign was changed to KVIN. It formerly featured programming provided from Jones Radio Network (Music of Your Life) and Dial Global/Westwood One's "America's Best Music" until December 2013.

On November 10, 2022, Threshold Communications, licensee of KVIN and translators K222BX and K296HL, filed applications with the Federal Communications Commission for consent to assign the stations to Punjabi American Media, LLC. The sale to Punjabi American Media was consummated on April 28, 2023.
