= K296GB =

Relays KYRV-HD2, Roseville
- North Highlands, California; United States
- Broadcast area: Sacramento, California
- Frequency: 107.1 MHz (HD Radio)
- Branding: 107.1 The Bull

Programming
- Format: Country
- Affiliations: Premiere Networks

Ownership
- Owner: Educational Media Foundation
- Operator: iHeartMedia
- Sister stations: KBEB; KFBK; KFBK-FM; KHYL; KSTE; KYRV; KZIS

History
- First air date: 2004
- Former call signs: K227AU (2004-2010)
- Former frequencies: 93.3 MHz (2004-2010)

Technical information
- Licensing authority: FCC
- Facility ID: 139604
- Class: D
- ERP: 250 watts
- HAAT: 86.3 meters (283 ft)

Links
- Public license information: Public file; LMS
- Webcast: Listen Live
- Website: thebullsacramento.iheart.com

K296GB (107.1 FM) is a radio station located in North Highlands, California. The station's license is held by the Educational Media Foundation; Its programming is provided by iHeartMedia. The station broadcasts a country music format branded as 107.1 The Bull. The station's programming can also be heard on KYRV's HD2 HD Radio subchannel and the iHeartRadio apps.

K296GB, which is a relay of KYRV's HD2 sub-channel, signed on in December 2014 with an alternative rock format as "Alt 107.1." On February 9, 2016, at Midnight, K296GB/KQJK-HD2 flipped to classic rock, branded as "107.1 The Brew." That following December, the stations began airing Christmas music as "The Holiday Brew." The programming was believed to be a stunt to a flip to a potential new format after the holiday season; however, the classic rock format returned after Christmas.

On April 3, 2017, KQJK flipped to classic rock themselves, branded as "93.7 The River." Because of this, the "Brew" format was modified to active rock, though this would last for just a couple of weeks before the translator/HD2 sub-channel changed to a temporary simulcast of KSTE. On May 22, 2017, K296GB/KYRV-HD2 changed their format to smooth jazz, branded as Smooth Jazz 107.1. From 1998 to 2010, the smooth jazz format was used on a station at 94.7 FM with the call letters KSSJ; it is now known as "Radio 94-7", an alternative rock station that uses the call sign KKDO.

On November 8, 2018, K296GB dropped the smooth jazz format and adopted KBEB's country format as part of a format change at the latter station. The stations simulcasted until November 12, when KBEB flipped to a soft adult contemporary format as "92.5 The Breeze".
