= KTTA =

KTTA may refer to:

- KTTA-LD, a low-power television station (channel 24, virtual 8) licensed to serve Monroe, Utah, United States
- KGRB (FM), a radio station (94.3 FM) licensed to serve Jackson, California, United States, which held the call sign KTTA from 2009 to 2010
- KLMG, a radio station (97.9 FM) licensed to serve Esparto, California, which held the call sign KTTA from 1998 to 2009
