= KXOA =

KXOA may refer to:

- 1470 AM (1945–1971 and 1978–1997), now KIID
- 107.9 FM (1945–1997), which became KDND
- 93.7 FM (1999–2004), now KYRV
