= KFBK =

KFBK may refer to:

- KFBK (AM), a radio station (1530 AM) licensed to serve Sacramento, California, United States
- KFBK-FM, a radio station (93.1) licensed to serve Pollock Pines, California, United States
