= KBAA =

California radio station

Simulcasts KRBN, Manton, CA
- Grass Valley, California; United States
- Broadcast area: Sacramento, California
- Frequency: 103.3 MHz
- Branding: Radio Lazer

Programming
- Format: Regional Mexican

Ownership
- Owner: Alfredo Plascencia; (Lazer Licenses, LLC)

Technical information
- Licensing authority: FCC
- Facility ID: 87969
- Class: A
- ERP: 1,250 watts
- HAAT: 336 meters (1,102 ft)
- Transmitter coordinates: 39°14′45″N 120°57′56″W

Links
- Public license information: Public file; LMS
- Webcast: Listen live
- Website: radiolazer.com/chico-redding

KBAA (103.3 FM) is a radio station broadcasting a Regional Mexican format to the Grass Valley, California, United States, as well as the area north of Sacramento. This station is currently owned by Alfredo Plascencia, through licensee Lazer Licenses, LLC. The station is a semi-simulcast of KRBN.

On October 21, 2014, Adelante Media Group announced that it was selling KBAA, its sister stations and its LPTV outlet in Sacramento to Lazer Broadcasting, pending FCC approval The transaction was consummated on December 31, 2014, at a price of $2.9 million. The station switched from a simulcast of KGRB 94.3 McFarland, California to a simulcast of KRBN 94.3 Manton, California in retrospect with Lazer's purchase of KCCL 101.5 in Woodland, California in 2023.
