= A's Radio Network =

Official radio network of MLB's Athletics

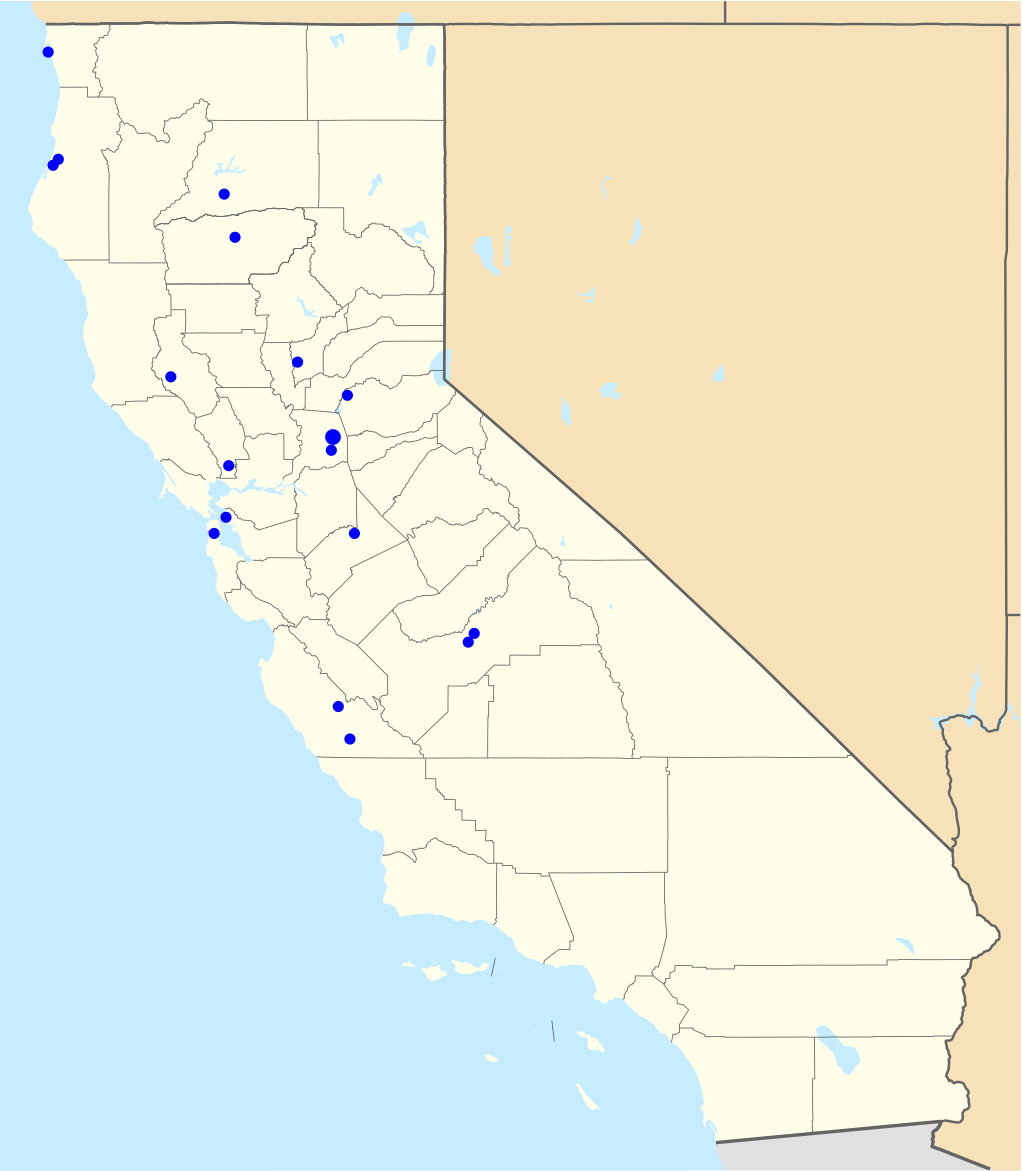
Map of radio affiliates in 2016

The A's Radio Network is an American radio network which carries English language coverage of the Athletics (A's), a professional baseball team in Major League Baseball (MLB). It consists of five AM stations and one FM translator in the state of California, including the flagship station, KSTE (650 AM), as well as one HD Radio channel in Nevada. There is also a two-station Spanish-language network (all AM). The Spanish-language network only airs night and weekend home games.

== Network stations ==
=== Flagships ===
Callsign	Frequency	Location
KSTE	650 AM	Rancho Cordova (Sacramento) (flagship)
KIQI	1010 AM	San Francisco (Spanish)

=== California ===
Callsign	Frequency	Location
KFPT	790 AM	Clovis (Fresno)
KFIG	1430 AM	Fresno
KNEW	960 AM	Oakland
KATD	990 AM	Pittsburg (Spanish)
KNRO	1400 AM	Redding (AM Stereo)
K280GP	103.9 FM	Redding

=== Nevada ===
Callsign	Frequency	Location
KWNR	95.5 FM HD2	Henderson (Las Vegas)

=== Former flagships ===
Year	Callsign	Frequency	Location
1968–1970	KNBR	680 AM	San Francisco
1971–1975	KEEN	1370 AM	San Jose
1976–1977	KNBR	680 AM	San Francisco
1978	KALX	90.7 FM	Berkeley
1978	KNEW	910 AM	Oakland
1979	KKIS	990 AM	Pittsburg
1980	KDIA	1310 AM	Oakland
1981–1992	KSFO	560 AM	San Francisco
1993	KNEW	910 AM	Oakland
1999–2001	KABL	960 AM	Oakland
2002–2005	KFRC	610 AM	San Francisco
2006	KYCY	1550 AM	San Francisco
2007–2008	KFRC / KYCY	610 AM / 1550 AM	San Francisco
2009–2010	KTRB	860 AM	San Francisco
2011–2018	KGMZ	95.7 FM	San Francisco
2019	KTRB	860 AM	San Francisco
2020–2024	KNEW	960 AM	San Francisco

=== Former affiliates ===
Callsign	Frequency	Location
KATA	1340 AM	Arcata, California
KAHI	950 AM	Auburn, California
K283CM	104.5 FM	Auburn, California
KPOD	1240 AM	Crescent City, California
K294CX	106.7 FM	Crescent City, California
KDAC	1230 AM	Fort Bragg, California
KRKC	1490 AM	King City, California
K285FW	104.9 FM	King City, California
KXBX	1270 AM	Lakeport, California
K243BT	96.5 FM	Lakeport, California
KMYC	1410 AM	Marysville, California
KESP	970 AM	Modesto, California
KVON	1440 AM	Napa, California
K275BJ	102.9 FM	Placerville, California
KBLF	1490 AM	Red Bluff, California
KHTK	1140 AM	Sacramento, California
KYMX	96.1 FM	Sacramento, California

== See also ==
- List of XM Satellite Radio channels
- List of Sirius Satellite Radio stations
- List of Oakland Athletics broadcasters
