= Armstrong & Getty =

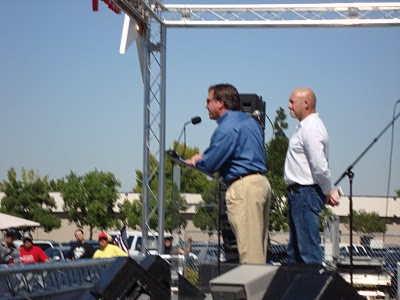
- Hosts Joe Getty and Jack Armstrong speaking at the 2010 Tax Day Tea Party Rally
- Genre: Talk show
- Running time: 4 hours
- Country of origin: United States
- Language: English
- Home station: KSTE
- Hosted by: Jack Armstrong, Joe Getty
- Executive producer: Michael Hanson
- Recording studio: California
- Original release: August 31, 1998 – present
- Opening theme: Greatest-clips compilation
- Other themes: "Monday" by Wilco
- Ending theme: Greatest-clips compilation
- Website: http://www.armstrongandgetty.com/ podcast = Free here

Armstrong & Getty are the hosts of The Armstrong & Getty Show, a nationally syndicated morning drive radio show hosted by Jack Armstrong and Joe Getty. The talk show format is a mixture of libertarian and conservative political commentary, observations on local, national, and international news as well as reflections on social issues presented with humor.

== Overview ==
The Armstrong & Getty Show airs live from the studios of 650 KSTE in Sacramento, weekdays 6 to 10 a.m., and is heard on numerous stations throughout the United States via syndication. The show won the Best of Sacramento award numerous years in a row and is available as a podcast now.

=== Doug Stephan incident ===
On July 28, 2010, Armstrong and Getty were tipped off by a listener that a fellow radio talk show host, Doug Stephan, had been stealing audio material from the Armstrong and Getty show, editing the audio, and using it in his show in an attempt to portray it as if he were speaking to their caller.

During that same broadcast, the hosts were able to speak to Douglas Stephan, himself, regarding the alleged plagiarism that appeared evident upon comparison of the duo's show content and Douglas Stephan's "callers" some days later. Stephen never admitted to the allegations, but apologized, saying that the calls were misplaced and accidentally played on his Good Day show.
