= KCVR =

KCVR may refer to:

- KCVR (AM), a radio station (1570 AM) licensed to Lodi, California, United States
- KCVR-FM, a radio station (98.9 FM) licensed to Columbia, California, United States
