= KYRV =

Radio station in Roseville, California

- Roseville, California; United States
- Broadcast area: Sacramento metropolitan area
- Frequency: 93.7 MHz (HD Radio)
- Branding: 93.7 The River

Programming
- Format: Classic hits
- Subchannels: HD2: 107.1 The Bull (Country)
- Affiliations: Premiere Networks

Ownership
- Owner: iHeartMedia, Inc.; (iHM Licenses, LLC)
- Sister stations: KBEB; KFBK; KFBK-FM; KHYL; KSTE; KZIS

History
- First air date: June 1970; 56 years ago
- Former call signs: KPOP-FM (CP, 1968–1969); KPIP (1969–1980); KPOP (1980–1986); KDJQ (1986–1987); KRXQ (1987–1998); KRAK (1998–1999); KXQA (1999); KXOA (1999–2004); KHWD (2004–2005); KQJK (2005–2017)
- Former frequencies: 93.5 MHz (1970–1988)
- Call sign meaning: "River" (also a reference to the Sacramento River)

Technical information
- Licensing authority: FCC
- Facility ID: 11273
- Class: B1
- ERP: 25,000 watts
- HAAT: 100 meters (330 ft)
- Transmitter coordinates: 38°44′21.6″N 121°12′53.8″W
- Translator: HD2: 107.1 K296GB (North Highlands)

Links
- Public license information: Public file; LMS
- Webcast: FM/HD1: Listen live (via iHeartRadio)
- Website: 937theriver.iheart.com

KYRV (93.7 FM) is a commercial radio station licensed to Roseville, California, and serving the Sacramento metropolitan area. It airs a classic hits radio format. KYRV is owned by iHeartMedia with studios and offices on River Park Drive near the Arden Fair Mall.

KYRV has an effective radiated power (ERP) of 25,000 watts. The transmitter is off Quail Lane in Granite Bay. KYRV broadcasts using HD Radio technology. Its HD2 signal carries country music as "107.1 The Bull", which feeds FM translator K296GB at 107.1 FM.

== History ==
=== Early years: 1970–1980 ===
In June 1970, the owners of KPOP (1110 AM), founded by Don Reeves, started a 3,000-watt station on 93.5 MHz in Roseville, California. The station debuted as KPIP and simulcast KPOP's middle of the road (MOR) music during the day while airing soul music at night.

In the mid-1970s, KPIP dropped the daytime MOR music and replaced it with Spanish-language programming from 5 a.m. to 5 pm. At 5 pm, the station would flip over to R&B and disco music. As time progressed, KPIP acquired the nickname of "The Disco Express."

=== Urban: 1980–1983 ===
In May 1980, the owners put the Spanish programming exclusively on 1110 AM and moved the KPIP call letters there. The FM station flipped to urban contemporary and took on the KPOP call sign. In 1982, the station attempted to promote itself as broadcasting in Dolby Stereo, although its transmitter was only equipped for standard FM stereo.

=== Alternative: 1983–1984 ===
In August 1983, KPOP changed to a modern rock format, adopting the slogan "Rock of the 80s". Radio consultant Rick Carroll, who developed the format at KROQ-FM in Los Angeles, released it for national syndication in the early 1983. KPOP became one of his clients. The format included new wave music, synthesizer-based "Europop", and some guitar-based punk rock (such as The Clash and The Ramones). Some of the disc jockeys from the urban contemporary era stayed on for the change to modern rock.

=== Top 40: 1984–1986 ===
In December 1983, Don Reeves sold KPOP to the Fuller-Jeffrey Broadcasting Company. Since the "Rock of the 80s" format was not producing high enough ratings, the new owners flipped the station to a contemporary hit radio (CHR/Top 40) format in January 1984. The owners kept the KPOP call letters and called the station "Pop Hits", aiming primarily at young women. Despite Sacramento under a mainstream CHR battle with KSFM and KWOD at the time, the 3,000-watt KPOP shifted to a rock-based CHR format in the fall of 1985. It retained the KPOP call letters but now called itself "Rock Hits". The station's overall ratings were not as strong as its competitors.

Photos of stunt by Mr. Kim Berry. Attempting to identify the DJ in blue shirt.

=== AOR: 1986–1998 ===
On January 10, 1986, morning drive time announcers Dave Skyler and Rusty Humphries staged a management-approved stunt to initiate a format change. They locked themselves in the studio and refused to leave until management allowed them to drop the KPOP call letters and switch the format to album-oriented rock (AOR). The flip occurred six hours later.

By this time, Sacramento only had one other AOR station: KZAP (98.5 FM), whose programming was beginning to skew toward 25-to-49-year-old males. KPOP changed its call letters to KDJQ and rebranded as "93 Rock". Targeting males ages 18–34, "93 Rock" featured music by mainstream hard rock artists. The KDJQ call letters were short-lived, however, as the station had a format and call sign similar to those on KDJK (95.1 FM, now KHKK) in Modesto. KDJK's owners served a cease and desist order against Fuller-Jeffrey, prompting the Sacramento station to change its call sign to KRXQ in short order. KRXQ's ratings began to increase, but the largest jumps began when the station's owners boosted the power, coupled with a shift in the station's frequency.

In July 1988, the station moved from 93.5 FM to 93.7 FM. In the process, the station increased its power from 3,000 watts to 25,000 watts, providing coverage to most of the Sacramento area. The station retained the "93 Rock" name, with billboards announcing the frequency change by stating "Now at 93.7 FM". KRXQ became quite successful with its hard-edged mainstream album rock format. By 1989, the station began overtaking rival KZAP in the ratings, often registering a share between 6 and 7. While KZAP began leaning towards older adults with mid-tempo and classic rock, KRXQ clearly skewed towards younger adults with up-tempo and current hard rock artists. By the fall of 1991, "93 Rock" was the top rock station in Sacramento. KZAP dropped AOR for country music on January 20, 1992.

In the early 1990s, disc jockey Kosar Jaff, along with other California DJs, experimented with beatmatching, which had not been done before on primetime radio. Beatmatching is a process where the starting and ending beats of two songs are merged, so that there is a clear transition between the two. The beatmatching done on the air allowed longer commentary by him, because the ending and beginning beats could be played during the commentary, rather than stopping the music to commentate for a shorter period before the next track. The 1990s also saw success for the station, including big deals made with major artists such as Sting, which led to appearances at the concert by the disc jockeys in collaboration with the artists' concert.

=== Classic country: 1998–1999 ===
On March 4, 1998, at 3 p.m., KRXQ and classic country-formatted KRAK-FM (98.5 FM) swapped frequencies. KRAK-FM, now at 93.7 FM, had poor ratings, so the country format and call letters were shifted to 1470 AM in January 1999. The KXOA call sign then moved to 93.7 FM.

=== Classic hits: 1999–2001 ===
On January 11, 1999, the station's owners flipped KXOA to classic hits, calling it "Arrow 93.7". The same format had been in use at 107.9 FM from 1994 to 1998. Basically, the format was a mix of rock songs released as singles from the 1960s through the 1980s that received airplay on top 40 stations. Few selections were exclusively album cuts. Initially, the station was fairly successful.

=== Hot talk: 2001–2002 ===
On June 18, 2001, station owners Infinity Broadcasting changed KXOA's format to hot talk. The KXOA call letters remained in place, but the station's slogan became "The Talk that Rocks". The station featured "The Howard Stern Show" during morning drive time and a mix of local and nationally syndicated talk show hosts the rest of the day.

On weekends, the station programmed classic hard rock, primarily released during the 1970s and 1980s. The music was highly familiar. KXOA struggled in the ratings, earning less than a 1.0 share in the 12+ demographic. The only national show with a substantial audience was Stern's. However, The KiddChris Show, airing locally in the evenings, was the station's highest-rated program consistently.

=== Rock: 2002–2004 ===
KXOA continued with the hot talk format until August 30, 2002. One of the nationally syndicated programs, New York-based Opie and Anthony, was cancelled from syndication (as well as on their home station of WNEW in New York City), when an on-air stunt involving sex in a Catholic church offended some listeners and station management. At that point, KXOA continued to air Howard Stern in morning drive and dropped all remaining talk shows from the schedule. The station continued to air classic hard rock the rest of the day, adopting a new slogan: "Sacramento's Hard Rock". Intending to compete with both KSEG (96.9 FM) and KRXQ, the station added more current material to its music mix in the summer of 2003, but the ratings did not improve.

=== Classic alternative: 2004–2005 ===
On February 5, 2004, the station dropped the KXOA call letters, rock format, and "Sacramento's Hard Rock" slogan. The station, now known as KHWD ("Howard 93-7"), retained Howard Stern in morning drive but flipped to a classic alternative format. Again, ratings did not improve. In early 2005, the station began adding new harder alternative rock to its mix. The move was seen by some as an attempt to pick up the audience KWOD (106.5 FM) abandoned when it shifted to an alternative/triple-A hybrid format on March 18, 2005. Radio insiders believed that KHWD would either switch to a Spanish-language or adult hits format after Howard Stern left for Sirius Satellite Radio.

=== Adult hits: 2005–2017 ===
On October 25, 2005, Infinity Broadcasting announced sweeping changes for many of its owned-and-operated stations carrying Howard Stern. Several major-market heritage rock stations (such as WXRK in New York and WYSP in Philadelphia) would have their formats overhauled completely. In Sacramento, at 10:30 am, KHWD switched to Jack FM, an adult hits format, with the new call letters KQJK. The station continued to air Stern until December 16, 2005, his last day on terrestrial radio.

On December 10, 2008, CBS Radio swapped five of its stations, including KQJK, to Clear Channel Communications (now iHeartMedia) in exchange for two stations in Houston.

=== Classic rock: 2017-2026 ===
Previous logo

On March 24, 2017, iHeartMedia announced that KQJK would flip to classic rock as "93.7 The River". The station officially made the change on April 3 at 12:01 am. The final song on Jack FM was "Purple Rain" by Prince, while the first song on "The River" was "Start Me Up" by The Rolling Stones. The station launched with a full-time DJ lineup with extensive history in the Sacramento market, including KRXQ veterans Dog & Joe in mornings, Monica Lowe from KZZO in middays, Derek Moore from KSEG in afternoons, and the syndicated Sixx Sense with Nikki Sixx in evenings. KQJK changed its call letters to KYRV the same day. Moore was laid off from iHeartMedia in late 2020. Morning show Producer Dana Thompson was officially added to the morning show line up in May 2021. Thompson was laid off from iHeartMedia in August 2023.

=== Classic hits: 2026-present ===
On May 6, 2026, the station segued to classic hits while retaining the River branding, and introduced a new on-air lineup including talent voice tracked from sister stations WRFY-FM and KJEB, and syndicated programs such as The Martha Quinn Show, and American Top 40 – The 80’s on Sunday mornings.
