= KCVR (AM) =

- Lodi, California; United States
- Broadcast area: Stockton metropolitan area
- Frequency: 1570 kHz
- Branding: Punjabi Radio USA

Programming
- Format: Punjabi Language

Ownership
- Owner: Balwinder Kaur Khalsa and Dilpreet Singh Khalsa; (Punjabi American Media, LLC)

History
- First air date: 1946
- Call sign meaning: Central Valley Radio

Technical information
- Licensing authority: FCC
- Facility ID: 60424
- Class: B
- Power: 1,000 watts (day); 500 watts (night)
- Transmitter coordinates: 38°5′9.7″N 121°13′0.8″W

Links
- Public license information: Public file; LMS
- Website: punjabiradiousa.com

KCVR (1570 AM) is a commercial radio station licensed to Lodi, California, United States. It airs Punjabi language programming and is owned by Punjabi American Media, LLC. Punjabi is a language spoken in parts of India and Pakistan. KCVR's programming is simulcast on KIID 1470 AM in Sacramento, KWRU 1300 AM in Fresno, KLHC 1350 AM in Bakersfield and KOBO 1450 AM in Yuba City.

KCVR's transmitter is sited off of Alpine Road in Lodi. The station covers the Stockton metropolitan area and the daytime signal covers parts of the Sacramento metropolitan area.

== History ==
In 1946, KCVR signed on the air. It was originally owned by Central Valley Radio, whose initials gave the station its call sign. At first, KCVR was a daytimer, powered at 500 watts and required to go off the air at sunset.

On September 16, 1948, the Federal Communications Commission authorized KCVR to increase its power to 1,000 watts but still broadcasting only in the daytime.

In the 1960s, KCVR adopted a Spanish language format, largely of Regional Mexican music. Jose Tapia was the station's principal personality from 1955 until 1963. In 1966, Spanish language personalities on KCVR included Tapia (who hosted "Asi Es Mi Tierra" five hours per week), Augie Soto (who hosted "Melodias del Valle" from 3 to 5 p.m. weekdays), Alex Vasquez (who hosted "Programa Latino America"), Carlos Montano (who hosted "La Hora del Hogar"), Tony Zuniga (who hosted "Atarceder Musical" and Tina Rodriguez (who hosted "Sobremesa Musical" on weekdays from 1 to 2 p.m. and "Rincon Norteno" from 2 to 3 p.m. weekdays).

On June 3, 2015, KCVR changed the format to Spanish contemporary hit radio, simulcasting KCVR-FM 98.9 MHz licensed to Columbia, California. Effective August 6, 2020, KCVR was acquired by Punjabi American Media, as part of a network of six Central California AM stations broadcasting Punjabi language programming.
