= KRHM-LP =

- Bakersfield, California; United States
- Broadcast area: Bakersfield area
- Frequency: 103.3 MHz
- Branding: La Redencion

Programming
- Language: Spanish
- Format: Christian

Ownership
- Owner: Pentecostal Church of God, I.M. Iorpca

History
- First air date: July 4, 2003
- Call sign meaning: RytHM fm rhythmic muzik (former branding)

Technical information
- Licensing authority: FCC
- Facility ID: 123382
- Class: L1
- ERP: 100 watts
- HAAT: 24.5 meters (80 ft)
- Transmitter coordinates: 35°16′2.00″N 119°1′49.00″W

Links
- Public license information: LMS
- Website: laredencion.net

KRHM-LP (103.3 FM) is a low-power FM radio station broadcasting a Spanish Religious format. Licensed to Bakersfield, California, United States, the station is currently owned by the Pentecostal Church of God, I.M. Iorpca.

== History ==
The station first went on the air on July 4, 2003, as a format of Reggae, Jazz, Caribbean, Hip Hop, Dancehall, Rhythm & Blues, and Blues. On December 31, 2013, the station's music format changed to Spanish Religious when La Redención acquired the station.

In November 2013, Forced Broadcasting sold KLHC. The last day of La Redención on KLHC 1350 AM was November 30, 2013. After the last day of broadcast until December 31, 2013, Redemption did not have a radio station. Before the last day of broadcast, La Redención had two meetings with pastors to continue transmitting their radio station. At 10:00 pm PT on December 31, 2013, La Redención went back on the air as an FM station broadcasting on 103.5 FM. As of January 2021, KRHM is now broadcasting on 103.3 as stated on their website.
