= KFBK-FM =

News/talk radio station in Pollock Pines–Sacramento, California

Simulcast of KFBK, Sacramento, CA
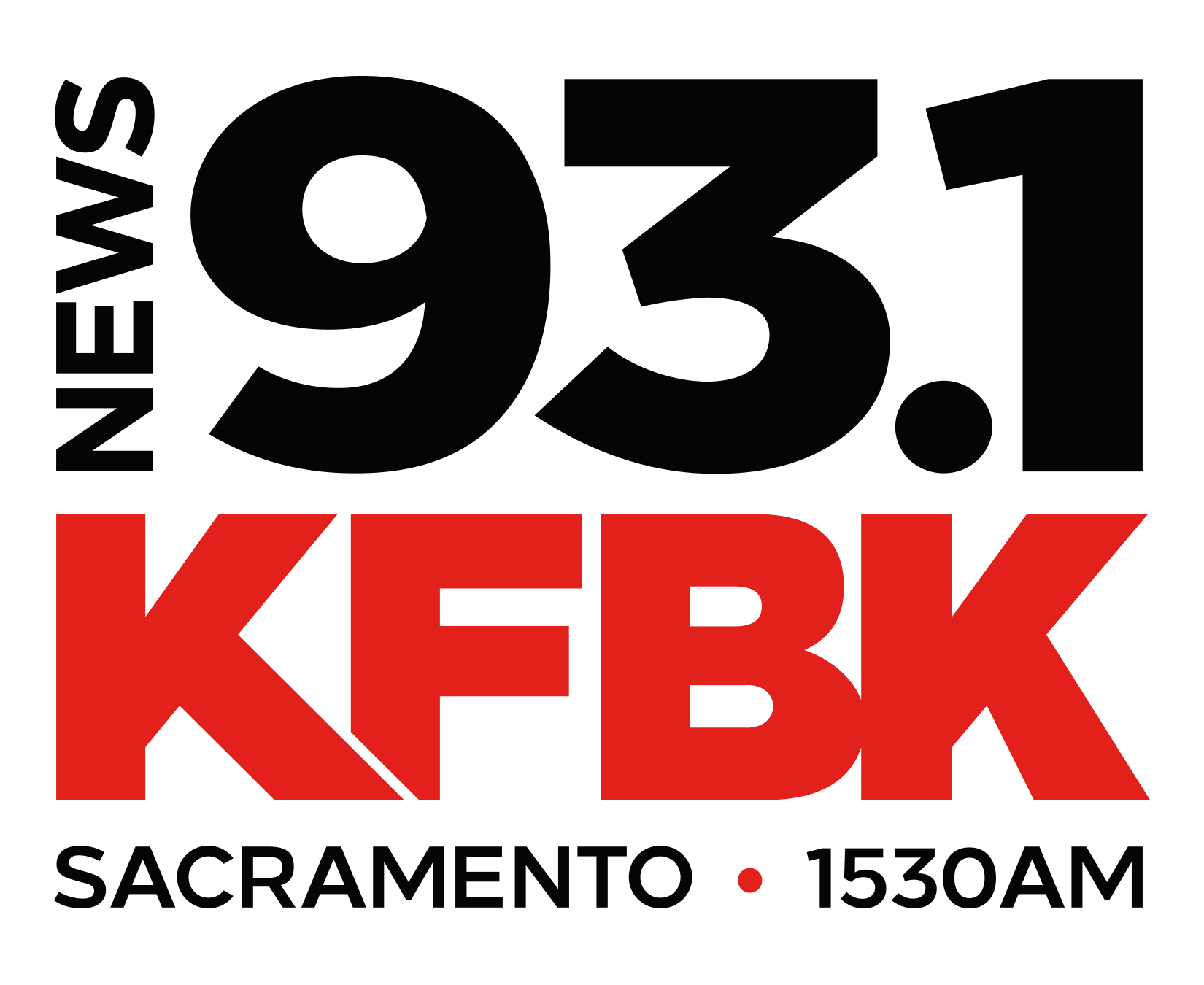
- Pollock Pines, California; United States
- Broadcast area: Sacramento metropolitan area
- Frequency: 93.1 MHz
- Branding: KFBK News Radio

Programming
- Format: Talk radio
- Affiliations: ABC News Radio; Compass Media Networks; Premiere Networks

Ownership
- Owner: iHeartMedia; (iHM Licenses, LLC)
- Sister stations: KBEB; KFBK; KHYL; KSTE; KYRV; KZIS

History
- First air date: August 19, 1976
- Former call signs: KSUE-FM (1979–1993); KJDX (1993–2008); KHJQ (2008–2009); KHLX (2009–2014)
- Former frequencies: 92.7 MHz (1976–1981); 93.3 MHz (1981–2009)
- Call sign meaning: Adapted from KFBK

Technical information
- Licensing authority: FCC
- Facility ID: 60300
- Class: B1
- ERP: 20,500 watts
- HAAT: 111 meters (364 ft)
- Transmitter coordinates: 38°38′10.5″N 120°38′14″W

Links
- Public license information: Public file; LMS
- Webcast: Listen live (via iHeartRadio)
- Website: kfbk.iheart.com

KFBK-FM (93.1 FM) is a commercial radio station licensed to Pollock Pines, California, United States, and serving the Sacramento metropolitan area. Owned by iHeartMedia, it carries a talk radio format simulcasting KFBK (1530 AM), with studios on River Park Drive in North Sacramento near the Arden Fair Mall.

KFBK-FM's transmitter is sited off on Grizzly Flat Road at Mehwald Lane in Sweeneys Crossing, an unincorporated community in El Dorado County.

== History ==
=== Early years: 1976-1993 ===
The station signed on the air on August 19, 1976. Its original city of license was Susanville as KSUE-FM, broadcasting on 92.7 MHz and with an effective radiated power of 160 watts. The station was co-owned with KSUE (1240 AM). At first it simulcast the AM station but later switched to its own beautiful music format, playing instrumental cover versions of popular songs.

In 1988, the station moved to 93.3 MHz, coupled with a giant increase in power, to 100,000 watts. That made it a potential "move-in" station. If it could be moved closer to Sacramento, it would benefit from being in the more lucrative radio market.

=== Country: 1993–2009 ===
On August 12, 1993, the call sign was changed to KJDX with a country music format.

In the summer of 2008, the station's transmitter was relocated closer to Sacramento, coupled with a change in its city of license to Pollock Pines. On November 11, 2008, Sierra Broadcasting swapped call signs and formats between KHJQ, which had moved from 92.3 FM in Susanville to the 93.3 FM frequency vacated by the station, and KJDX. This brought KJDX back to the 93.3 FM frequency in Susanville.

=== Classic hits: 2009–2013 ===
In May 2009, new owners Clear Channel Communications (now iHeartMedia) announced it was moving KHJQ's frequency from 93.3 to 93.1 so it would not interfere with the 93.3 frequency in nearby San Francisco. Because of this frequency move, KOSO in Patterson, California (targeting the Modesto area), moved from 93.1 to 92.9 FM on June 1, 2009. The format became classic hits as "Classic 93.1" under the KHLX call letters. All disc jockeys were voice tracked from other Clear Channel stations around the country.

On November 1, 2013, KHLX ended its classic hits format and began playing Christmas music for the holiday season.

=== News–talk: 2013–present ===
On December 19, 2013, Clear Channel announced it would switch its KFBK simulcast from 92.5 to 93.1. The call letters of KFBK-FM and KHLX would be flipped after the latter finished its holiday music programming on December 26, with the KFBK news/talk simulcast moving to 93.1, while KHLX took over the 92.5 frequency with a country music format. KHLX has since switched its call letters to KBEB, first airing country music and now carrying a soft adult contemporary format as "The Breeze".

== Programming ==
Cristina Mendonsa and Sam Shane host the station's morning-drive all-news block, while John McGinness and Kitty O'Neal host programs in the afternoon; the remainder of the schedule consists of nationally-syndicated conservative talk shows, including former KFBK host Tom Sullivan.

== KFBK-FM HD2 ==
On February 1, 2011, KHLX added a smooth jazz format to its HD2 digital subchannel, using programming from iHeartRadio. It filled a void left when Smooth Jazz 94.7 KSSJ ended its jazz format and became KKDO. The KFBK-FM subchannel was turned off in 2022.
