= Comstock's =

Business magazine in California

- Editor: Judy Farah
- Senior Editor: Jennifer Fergesen
- Assistant Editor: Dakota Morlan
- Special Sections Editor: Jessica Laskey
- Categories: Business
- Frequency: Monthly
- Publisher: Comstock Publishing Inc.
- Founder: Winnie Comstock-Carlson
- First issue: July 1989
- Country: United States
- Based in: Sacramento, California
- Language: English
- Website: comstocksmag.com

Comstock's is a monthly business magazine distributed in the Sacramento metropolitan area. Founded in 1989 by Winnie Comstock-Carlson, it covers the region's businesses and community leaders. The magazine employs a network of freelance writers to produce its editorial content. Its slogan is "Business insight for California's Capital Region." Since 2020, Comstock's has been a provisional member of the California News Publishers Association.

== History ==
The magazine's founder, Winnie Comstock-Carlson, was born inside a Japanese-run internment camp in the Philippines during World War II. She grew up in Nevada City and moved to Sacramento in 1962.

Comstock-Carlson's first job in the magazine industry was working as an advertisement salesperson at Sacramento Magazine for five years. She then worked for another nine years at Executive Place magazine, which later relaunched as California Executive magazine. It shuttered in 1989. Comstock-Carlson was the magazine's publisher for its final months before bankruptcy and said its last issues were profitable, but not enough to cover debts.

A few weeks after California Executive closed Comstock-Carlson got the idea to start her own magazine. She awoke at 3 a.m. to the image of a magazine cover across her entire bedroom wall with the name "Comstock’s" on it along with the number 15. Comstock-Carlson interpreted this as a message from God telling her to start her own magazine. She said the cover in her vision was the same as the one used for the Comstock's 15-year anniversary edition. She also said that the number 15 represented how many years it took before the magazine became profitable.

Comstock-Carlson showed a copy of the business magazine Regardie's to help sell advertisers on the inaugural issue. Lacking funds in 1989, she convinced vendors to wait for payment until after publishing the first edition. Comstock-Carlson used a home equity loan to fund the magazine's launch. But six months later the United States entered into a recession. She took on credit card debt to keep the business afloat until it was financially sustainable. Janice Fillip, founding editor of Architecture California magazine, was hired to edit the magazine in 1994. Alan Ewen was the founding chairman of Comstock's advisory board.

In 1995, Winnie Comstock married John P. Carlson, a marketing consultant who ran his own advertising agency. That same year he became the magazine's executive editor. He held that position until his death from cancer in 2001. In 1996, the magazine launched a northern Nevada edition published quarterly and opened a second office in Reno, Nevada. That same year the magazine considered launching a Fresno, California edition that would cover the San Joaquin Valley. This quarterly edition did launch at some point before 2003.

In 2020, the magazine's digital editor Matthew Keys abruptly quit. A few weeks later the publication's YouTube channel was deleted. A judge ruled Keys was responsible and that this action violated his parole. He was sentenced to serve another six months in prison. Keys denied the accusations and in his newsletter claimed Comstock's had violated federal advertising regulations by not properly labeling native advertisements and misled city governments by inflating readership numbers to convince them to buy ads.

== Name origin ==
Winnie Comstock-Carlson decided to use her own name as the magazine's title partly because of its local historical significance, such as the Comstock Lode in Nevada and the Comstock family who helped develop Sacramento. Businessman William Dutton Comstock served as the city's mayor in 1890. According to the City of Sacramento's archives, “Mr. Comstock and his family occupy a lead position in social circles and all who pass through the portals of their cultured home enjoy a most cordial hospitality.” The estate of his daughter Sophia P. Comstock helped fund the Pony Express Statue at Old Sacramento State Historic Park. Comstock-Carlson was also inspired by the business magazine Regardie's, which was named after its owner, and by a dream she had where she awoke to a magazine cover across her bedroom wall with her last name on it.

== Prosper magazine ==
In fall 2004, two senior editors and another staffer at Comstock's quit to start a rival business publication called Prosper magazine. The new magazine was financially backed by Warren Smith, co-owner of the Sacramento River Cats. Five months after launch, Michael Teel, owner of Raley's Supermarkets, bought a majority stake in Prosper magazine. Comstock-Carlson said the competition forced her to "write some huge checks" and take on a second mortgage to pay for a circulation audit, new computers, new software and better trained staff. "It was a blessing to us," Comstock-Carlson later said. "We needed a kick in the pants to get to the next level." Prosper shuttered after three years and published its final issue in December 2007.

== Circulation ==
Comstock's launched in 1989 with a controlled qualified circulation of 15,000. These issues were unsolicited free copies sent to local company executives and owners of businesses who employed at least 10 people and had at least $1 million in annual sales. At the time Comstock-Carlson had a goal of getting to 10,000 paid subscribers. By 1996, Comstock's had a monthly circulation of 20,000 in Sacramento and another 12,000 for its northern Nevada edition published quarterly. A Fresno edition was created before 2003. in 2022, the magazine reportedly reached about 80,000 readers each month.

== Awards and recognition ==
Comstock's has won two Maggie Awards from the Western Publishing Association and has won several California Journalism Awards over multiple years from the California News Publishers Association.

In 2014, Congresswoman Doris Matsui recognized the magazine's 25th anniversary during a session of the United States House of Representatives.

In 2017, the magazine's founder Winnie Comstock-Carlson was named "Sacramentan of the Year" by the Sacramento Metro Chamber.
