= KIQI =

Coordinates: 37°49′33.7″N 122°18′40.9″W

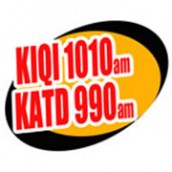
- San Francisco, California; United States
- Broadcast area: San Francisco Bay Area
- Frequency: 1010 kHz

Programming
- Language: Spanish
- Format: Talk radio (brokered programming)
- Affiliations: Oakland Athletics Spanish Radio Network

Ownership
- Owner: Multicultural Broadcasting; (Multicultural Radio Broadcasting Licensee, LLC)
- Sister stations: KATD, KEST, KSJX

History
- First air date: 1958
- Former call signs: KPOO (1950–1954); KRUZ (1954–1957); KSAY (1957–1974)
- Call sign meaning: Originally: Derived from former sister station KIOI; Currently: 1010 AM (station frequency)

Technical information
- Licensing authority: FCC
- Facility ID: 26925
- Class: B
- Power: 10,000 watts
- Repeater: 990 KATD (Pittsburg)

Links
- Public license information: Public file; LMS
- Website: kiqi1010am.com

KIQI (1010 AM) is a commercial radio station in San Francisco, California. It is owned by Multicultural Broadcasting and airs a Spanish-language talk radio format. KIQI 1010 AM is simulcast on KATD 990 AM in the Sacramento Valley. Most shows are paid brokered programming where the hosts purchase time on the station and may advertise their companies and services. KIQI and KATD carry Oakland Athletics baseball games in Spanish. The station's studios and offices are located near the Civic Center in San Francisco.

1010 AM is a Canadian clear-channel frequency, on which CFRB Toronto and CBR Calgary are the Class A dominant stations. KIQI broadcasts at 10,000 watts but must use a directional antenna at all times to protect those and other stations on 1010 AM. The transmitter is at the San Francisco–Oakland Bay Bridge toll plaza in Oakland.

== History ==
This station first received its FCC construction permit in 1950. During construction, it was assigned the call sign KPOO, and then KRUZ, before settling on KSAY on January 5, 1957. In 1958, KSAY signed on the air. Originally the station was a daytimer, required to go off the air between sunset and sunrise. It was owned by the KSAY Broadcasting Company.

In 1974, KSAY was sold to Peninsula FM, a broadcast company headed by radio entrepreneur James Gabbert, which also owned FM station KIOI at the time of acquisition. Upon its closure, the station's call sign was changed to the current KIQI, and flipped to oldies. By 1980, it switched to a Spanish language format with Regional Mexican music.

In 1993, KIQI began simulcasting on KATD (990 AM) in Pittsburg, California. Both stations were acquired by Multicultural Broadcasting in 2003. The company is based in New York City and is headed by businessman Arthur Liu.
