= KPOD (AM) =

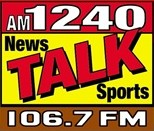
- Crescent City, California; United States
- Broadcast area: Crescent City area
- Frequency: 1240 kHz
- Branding: KPOD AM 1240

Programming
- Format: Talk and sports
- Affiliations: Fox News Radio; Fox Sports Radio; Premiere Networks; Westwood One; Oakland Athletics Radio Network

Ownership
- Owner: Bicoastal Media Licenses II, LLC

History
- First air date: 1951
- Former frequencies: 1400 kHz (1951–1958)

Technical information
- Licensing authority: FCC
- Facility ID: 72537
- Class: C
- Power: 1,000 watts
- Transmitter coordinates: 41°45′34.4″N 124°11′32.3″W
- Translator: 106.7 K294CX (Crescent City)

Links
- Public license information: Public file; LMS
- Webcast: Listen live
- Website: kpod.com

KPOD (1240 AM) is a radio station broadcasting a talk and sports format. Licensed to Crescent City, California, United States, the station serves the Crescent City area. The station is currently owned by Bicoastal Media Licenses II, LLC. Its current programming features current news stories and talk radio programming weekdays from 6 AM to 6 PM. The rest of the time slots (including weekends) are filled by Fox Sports Radio.

Prior to early 2010, it was broadcasting an oldies–standards format courtesy of Citadel Media's "Timeless" format.
