= KDEE-LP =

Coordinates: 38.606111°N 121.444722°W

- Sacramento, California; United States
- Frequency: 97.5 MHz
- Branding: 97.5 KDEE, The Soul of Sacramento

Programming
- Format: Urban adult contemporary, community radio

Ownership
- Owner: California Black Chamber of Commerce Foundation

History
- First air date: October 24, 2004
- Former frequencies: 97.7 MHz (2005–2012)
- Call sign meaning: Dedicated to Economic Empowerment

Technical information
- Licensing authority: FCC
- Class: L1
- ERP: 100 watts
- HAAT: 40 meters

Links
- Public license information: LMS
- Webcast: Listen live
- Website: www.kdeefm.org

KDEE-LP (97.5 FM) is a community radio station based in Sacramento, California.

== History ==
KDEE-LP was launched in 2004 by the California Black Chamber of Commerce. It is a community-oriented, commercial-free radio station serving the Greater Sacramento area with public affairs information, news for small business entrepreneurs, and youth programming. KDEE 97.5 FM is located at 1600 Sacramento Inn Way, Suite 232, Sacramento, CA 95815.

== Format ==
KDEE-LP provides a mix of music under the Urban Adult Contemporary format: MoTown, Soul, Neo-Soul, today's R&B, Jazz, Urban Gospel, new music from rising and established artists, and news. The station offers commercial-free programming and talk shows to provide information specific to the Sacramento community. KDEE-LP has a more expanded playlist typical of most non-commercial stations averaging 3,000 songs, and avoiding hip hop/rap music altogether. This makes it a community alternative to commercial stations KSFM, KHYL and former stations KBMB and KSSJ.

== Programming ==
Current "On Air" personalities are Tristen Mays, Jay King and Leon Guidry, along with several Sacramento community leaders and guests.

Talk shows include In Black America, Free Talk Live, Health Matters, and Mid-Day Connect.

Programming includes Gospel Soul Sunday, The Smooth Vibe, New Music Mondays, Hot Lunch Special, and Friday Night Dance Party. Note: SacTown's Smooth Vibe, hosted by Leon Guidry, blends the softer side of soul with urban and smooth Jazz. Sunday's noon till 6pm (PST)

== Coverage ==
When KDEE-LP was launched, it was originally on 97.7 FM, and could only be heard in the eastern part of Sacramento County at the most; it is not heard over the air too well in Sacramento proper, especially the African American community. However, this situation has been somewhat remedied: they have since launched a webcast. In 2011, KDEE-LP was moved to 97.5 FM and the transmitter was moved to provide better coverage. The terrestrial signal now covers the Sacramento metropolitan area and several outlying areas such as Davis, Elk Grove, Roseville, and Natomas. The 97.5 online stream (kdeefm.org) is available anywhere you get an Internet connection.

== See also ==
- List of community radio stations in the United States
