= KJDX =

- Susanville, California; United States
- Broadcast area: Sierra Nevada
- Frequency: 93.3 MHz
- Branding: JDX

Programming
- Format: Country music
- Affiliations: ABC News Radio, Westwood One

Ownership
- Owner: Sierra Broadcasting; (Sierra Broadcasting Corporation)
- Sister stations: KSUE

History
- First air date: May 23, 1983
- Former call signs: KNXN (1983–1988); KQNC (1988–1997); KHJQ (1997–2008)
- Former frequencies: 102.1 MHz, 92.3 MHz

Technical information
- Licensing authority: FCC
- Facility ID: 50306
- Class: C0
- ERP: 100,000 watts
- HAAT: 352.0 meters (1,154.9 ft)
- Transmitter coordinates: 40°27′13″N 120°34′14″W

Links
- Public license information: Public file; LMS
- Website: sierradailynews.com/kjdx.html

KJDX (93.3 FM, "JDX") is a radio station broadcasting a country music format. Licensed to Susanville, California, United States, it serves portions of the northern Sierra Nevada region.

It first began broadcasting in 1983 under the call sign KNXN. The station is currently owned by Sierra Broadcasting.

== History ==
The station was first assigned the call sign "KNXN" on May 23, 1983 on 102.1 FM. On May 27, 1988, the calls sign was changed to "KQNC". On February 20, 1997, the call sign was changed to KHJQ with a Hot AC format as "Q92". In 2003, the station moved to 92.3 FM.

In the summer of 2008, the station was moved to the recently vacated 93.3 FM frequency. On November 11, 2008, Sierra Broadcasting swapped call signs and formats between KJDX, which had vacated the 93.3 FM frequency in Susanville for the same frequency in Pollock Pines, California (in suburban Sacramento), and KHJQ.

This move brought KJDX back to the 93.3 FM frequency in Susanville. The newly moved KHJQ became KHLX, and is operated in Sacramento by Clear Channel.
