= KATD =

Simulcasts KIQI, San Francisco
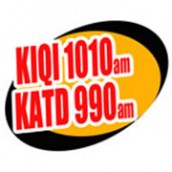
- Pittsburg, California; United States
- Broadcast area: Sacramento Valley
- Frequency: 990 kHz

Programming
- Language: Spanish
- Format: Talk radio (brokered programming)
- Affiliations: Oakland Athletics Spanish Radio Network

Ownership
- Owner: Multicultural Broadcasting; (Way Broadcasting Licensee, LLC)
- Sister stations: KIQI

History
- First air date: 1949
- Former call signs: KIXA (1990–1993)

Technical information
- Licensing authority: FCC
- Facility ID: 52256
- Class: B
- Power: 10,000 watts (day); 5,000 watts (night)
- Transmitter coordinates: 38°30′16.7″N 121°10′51.8″W

Links
- Public license information: Public file; LMS
- Website: kiqi1010am.com

KATD (990 AM) is a radio station that rebroadcasts San Francisco station KIQI. Licensed to Pittsburg, California, the station serves the Sacramento Valley. The station is currently owned by Multicultural Broadcasting. KATD is partnered with the Oakland Athletics and broadcasts night and weekend home games.

== History ==
In the late 1950s, the station's call letters were "KKIS." On January 1, 1960, Kay Kis Corporation assumed ownership of the station. The two principal owners were Len and Burrell Small (their grandfather was a former Illinois governor). The general manager was Jerry Bassett, who previously managed radio station WISC in Madison, Wisc.

The station had the call letters KIXA on August 17, 1990. On September 8, 1993, the station changed its call sign to the current KATD as a rebroadcast of KIQI.

Prior to 1990, this frequency was occupied by KKIS, which was playing Adult Top 40/Hot AC music as late as 1985.
