= KSUE =

- Susanville, California; United States
- Broadcast area: Sierra Nevada
- Frequency: 1240 kHz

Programming
- Format: Talk radio
- Affiliations: Fox News Radio; Compass Media Networks; Premiere Networks; Salem Radio Network; Westwood One

Ownership
- Owner: Sierra Broadcasting Corporation
- Sister stations: KJDX

History
- First air date: 1948
- Call sign meaning: Susanville

Technical information
- Licensing authority: FCC
- Facility ID: 60302
- Class: C
- Power: 1,000 watts
- Transmitter coordinates: 40°23′44.6″N 120°37′43.5″W

Links
- Public license information: Public file; LMS
- Webcast: Listen live
- Website: sierradailynews.com/ksue

KSUE (1240 AM) is a radio station broadcasting a talk radio format. Licensed to Susanville, California, United States, it serves the Sierra Nevada area.

The station is currently owned by Sierra Broadcasting Corporation and features programming from Fox News Radio, Compass Media Networks, Premiere Networks, Salem Radio Network, and Westwood One.

== History ==
In July 1948, the station's call letters changed from the original KSUH to KSUE. The new designation honored Susan Roop, for whom Susanville was named. She was the daughter of the town's founder.
