= Sactown Magazine =

US magazine

- Frequency: Quarterly
- Publisher: Metropolis Publishing
- Founder: Rob Turner; Elyssa Lee
- Founded: 2006
- Country: USA
- Based in: Sacramento, CA 95814
- Language: English
- Website: sactownmag.com
- ISSN: 1932-622X

Sactown Magazine is a publication reporting on the cultural offerings of Sacramento, California and the surrounding region. It began publication in December 2006.

== History ==
The magazine was founded in 2006 by husband-and-wife team Rob Turner and Elyssa Lee. Turner, then 39, graduated from UC Davis and went on to work for the Sacramento News & Review, SmartMoney and Money magazine, and was a freelance writer for The New York Times Magazine and The Wall Street Journal. Lee, then 34, had worked as a staff reporter for Money magazine before joining the editorial team at InStyle magazine. The two met while working together at Money in New York City. Steve Childs, former president of Texas Monthly, was Sactown's first publisher.

The publication competed with the older and larger Sacramento Magazine. "Our goal is for every single page to generate some type of discussion or be surprising," Turner told The Sacramento Bee. Sam McManis, a media critic for the paper offered both rants and raves on the inaugural issue.

In 2023, Sactown purchased the assets of the defunct Sacramento Magazine, which included intellectual property like subscriber and advertising lists.
