= KSMH =

- West Sacramento, California; United States
- Broadcast area: Sacramento metropolitan area
- Frequency: 1620 kHz
- Branding: Relevant Radio

Programming
- Format: Catholic radio
- Network: Relevant Radio

Ownership
- Owner: Relevant Radio, Inc.

History
- First air date: February 1999
- Call sign meaning: "Sacrament Most Holy"

Technical information
- Licensing authority: FCC
- Facility ID: 87036
- Class: B
- Power: 10,000 watts (day); 1,000 watts (night)
- Transmitter coordinates: 38°35′16.7″N 121°28′8.8″W
- Translator: 97.7 K249FJ (Rocklin)

Links
- Public license information: Public file; LMS
- Webcast: Listen live
- Website: relevantradio.com

KSMH (1620 AM) is a radio station broadcasting a Catholic radio format as part of the Relevant Radio network. Licensed to West Sacramento, California, United States, it serves the Sacramento metropolitan area. The station is owned by Relevant Radio, Inc. with transmitter sited on 28th Street in Sacramento, near the American River and The Capital Freeway.

== History ==
KSMH originated as the expanded band "twin" of an existing station on the standard AM band. On March 17, 1997 the Federal Communications Commission (FCC) announced that eighty-eight stations had been given permission to move to newly available "Expanded Band" transmitting frequencies, from 1610 to 1700 kHz, with KAHI in Auburn, California, authorized to move to 1620 kHz.

The expanded band operation on 1620 kHz signed on the air in February 1999 as KSMH. The FCC initially provided that both the original station and its expanded band counterpart could optionally operate simultaneously for up to five years, after which owners would have to turn in one of the two licenses, depending on whether they preferred the new assignment or elected to remain on the original frequency. However, this deadline has been extended numerous times, and both stations have remained authorized. One restriction is that the FCC has generally required paired original and expanded band stations to remain under common ownership.

Immaculate Heart Radio bought the station only months after KSMH went on the air. In April 1999, it paid $475,000 for KSMH and KAHI. KSMH was initially located in Auburn; it moved to West Sacramento in 2001, but FCC regulations require that it continue to be co-owned with KAHI, which remains operated by the stations' former owner under a time brokerage agreement. Immaculate Heart Radio merged with Relevant Radio in 2017.
