= KZIS =

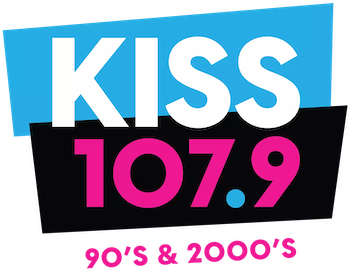
- Sacramento, California; United States
- Broadcast area: Sacramento metro area
- Frequency: 107.9 MHz (HD Radio)
- Branding: Kiss 107.9

Programming
- Format: Hot adult contemporary

Ownership
- Owner: iHeartMedia; (iHM Licenses, LLC)
- Sister stations: KBEB; KFBK; KFBK-FM; KHYL; KSTE; KYRV

History
- First air date: May 4, 2022; 4 years ago
- Former call signs: KSTE-FM (May 4, 2022-June 8, 2022)
- Call sign meaning: Use of the "Kiss FM" brand

Technical information
- Licensing authority: FCC
- Facility ID: 762478
- Class: B
- ERP: 50,000 watts
- HAAT: 123 m (404 ft)
- Transmitter coordinates: 38°42′38″N 121°28′58″W

Links
- Public license information: Public file; LMS
- Webcast: Listen live (via iHeartRadio)
- Website: kiss1079.iheart.com

KZIS (107.9 MHz) is a radio station in Sacramento, California, United States. It is owned and operated by iHeartMedia, broadcasting from the iHeartMedia studio center in North Sacramento and a tower north of the city near Elverta, also used by KXPR and KQEI-FM. The station is broadcasting a hot adult contemporary format as "Kiss 107.9".

KZIS began broadcasting on May 4, 2022, under the call sign KSTE-FM. The frequency had been vacant in Sacramento after KDND, its original user, was taken off the air by owner Entercom in February 2017, with its intellectual property moved to sister station KUDL. The license renewal of KDND had been subject to an FCC hearing over the 2007 death of a contestant in a contest held by the station.

== Prior use of 107.9 MHz in Sacramento ==
The original radio station on 107.9 MHz in Sacramento was built as KXOA-FM in 1947. After originally simulcasting KXOA (1470 AM), the station tried several formats, including country music and oldies, before finding success in the 1970s with a soft album-oriented rock format and later with soft adult contemporary as "K108". In 1998, KXOA-FM became KDND "The End" and adopted a contemporary hit radio format, which would remain for 19 years.

On January 12, 2007, KDND's morning show held a "Hold Your Wee for a Wii" contest, in which contestants were asked to drink as much water as they could without urinating to try to win a Nintendo Wii game console. One contestant, Jennifer Strange, died of water intoxication. As a result, the morning show hosts were fired alongside several other employees. A jury in 2009 found the Sacramento subsidiary of the station's owner, Entercom, to be at fault for her death in a wrongful death case brought by Strange's family.

In 2013, the Media Action Center filed a petition to deny the license renewal of KDND for a new eight-year term. The Federal Communications Commission (FCC) had designated the renewal for hearing in October 2016 as a result of the petition. However, in February 2017, Entercom announced it would merge with CBS Radio. Because any delay associated with the KDND license renewal hearing could derail the timely approval by the FCC of the larger transaction, Entercom moved its format and programming to KUDL (106.5 FM) on February 6, shuttered KDND on February 8, and surrendered the station license to the FCC for cancellation, settling with Media Action Center.

== History ==
=== FCC auction ===
The FCC returned the 107.9 frequency on which KDND was licensed to operate to the agency's inventory of unused channels, to be put up for auction to the highest bidder. The FCC stipulated that use of the frequency must retain its short-spaced protections to KSAN (107.7 FM) in San Mateo; any new station would be limited to 50 kW ERP and an average height above average terrain of 123 meters in the direction of KSAN.

The FCC included the 107.9 frequency in its Auction 106, which was scheduled to begin April 28, 2020, but the auction was indefinitely postponed on March 25, 2020, due to the onset of the COVID-19 pandemic. The allocation was again put up for auction as part of FCC Auction 109 beginning July 27, 2021, and was auctioned off to iHeartMedia for $6,146,000. iHeart opted to locate the station, now with the KSTE-FM call letters, from the same tower where KDND had operated near Elverta.

=== Startup ===
On May 4, 2022, KSTE-FM signed on, beginning a soft launch by stunting with loops of songs relevant to the specific date through May 9, followed by dead air punctuated with cryptic liners themed around listening, interspersed with audio bits pretending to be the results of "listening in" to the queries and discussions of area people using voice assistants. On May 16, the station began promoting iHeartRadio's "Talkback" feature, airing messages from listeners made using the feature (including, but not limited to, song requests, general suggestions for the station's permanent format, and comments on news stories). On May 19, KSTE-FM returned to teasing different formats and asking listeners to vote on what permanent format the station should play, starting with Christmas music; over the next two weeks, this would be followed up with Pride Radio, Top 40, contemporary Christian, classic alternative, Spanish Top 40, classic country, 1990s dance music, classic hip hop, yacht rock, 1980s hits, 1990s hits, 2000s hits, country, and pop music.

On June 3, it was announced that KSTE-FM would launch its permanent format at noon on June 8; for the remaining days of the stunting, the station played "party songs" from the previous 25 years. At the promised time, after airing a one-hour countdown, KSTE-FM debuted a hot adult contemporary format emphasizing 1990s and 2000s hits (as well as some re-currents) as "Kiss 107.9", with "Let's Get It Started" by The Black Eyed Peas being the first song played. iHeart filed for the call sign KZIS on June 22, which took effect on June 28. Following the call sign change, the station began broadcasting in HD Radio.

In June 2026, as part of a strategy of moving several stations from local to national music logs, KZIS shifted in a more mainstream hot AC direction, dropping the 90s-and-2000s focus in favor of a 90s-to-now presentation, while running the national "Today's Mix" network. The station had been rising from a 2.9 in the March Nielsen books to a 4.0 in May.
