= KHYL =

Radio station in Auburn, California

Coordinates: 38.858°N 121.029°W

- Auburn, California; United States
- Broadcast area: Sacramento metropolitan area
- Frequency: 101.1 MHz (HD Radio)
- Branding: V101.1

Programming
- Format: Classic hip hop-leaning Rhythmic AC
- Subchannels: HD2: TikTok Radio
- Affiliations: Compass Media Networks

Ownership
- Owner: iHeartMedia, Inc.; (iHM Licenses, LLC)
- Sister stations: KBEB; KFBK; KFBK-FM; KSTE; KYRV; KZIS

History
- First air date: December 21, 1961
- Former call signs: KAHI-FM (CP; 1960); KAFI (1960–1978)

Technical information
- Licensing authority: FCC
- Facility ID: 10144
- Class: B
- ERP: 36,000 watts
- HAAT: 176 meters (577 ft)

Links
- Public license information: Public file; LMS
- Webcast: Listen live (via iHeartRadio)
- Website: V1011fm.com/

KHYL (101.1 FM) is a commercial radio station, licensed to Auburn, California, and serving the Sacramento metropolitan area. It broadcasts a classic hip hop radio format and is owned by iHeartMedia, Inc. The studios and offices are on River Park Drive, off the Capital City Freeway in North Sacramento near the Arden Fair Mall.

KHYL has an effective radiated power (ERP) of 37,000 watts. The transmitter is on Catecroft Lane in Pilot Hill, California. KHYL broadcasts in the HD Radio hybrid format; the HD-2 subchannel airs iHeartRadio's "TikTok Radio" service.

== History ==
=== AM simulcast: 1961-1977 ===
On December 21, 1961, the station first signed on with the call letters KAFI. It largely simulcasted sister station KAHI (950 AM) in Auburn. KAFI and KAHI were owned by Donnelly C. Reeves. KAFI only broadcast at 3,200 watts, with a short antenna, so it could only be heard in and around Auburn.

KAFI got a signal upgrade in 1977 to target the Sacramento metropolitan area. In addition, the call letters were changed to KHYL.

=== Oldies/AC: 1977-1999 ===
As KHYL, the station switched to an oldies format, known as "K-HYL". It dabbled with adult contemporary music in the mid-1980s.

The studios were moved to 2435 Marconi in Sacramento and the branding became "Solid Gold 101" on June 6, 1988, and "Oldies 101" until 1991. John Parker owned the station until American Media purchased and re-branded the station as "COOL 101" in 1991.

COOL 101 was imaged in the style of Drake-Chenault (KYNO/KHJ/KFRC) Top 40 Radio delivery, with the use of the Johnny Mann Boss Radio Jingles, top the hour timpani and the booming voice of Charlie Van Dyke. COOL 101 also added the San Francisco 49ers football broadcasts to the station's schedule, which was not a common move for FM music stations in those days. KHYL was usually one of the top 5 stations in the 25-54 ratings demographic during this time (per Arbitron).

=== Rhythmic Oldies: 1999-2001 ===
In 1996, Chancellor Media (later AMFM) purchased American Media, and in 1997, moved to the current location at 1440 Ethan Way in Sacramento. On May 25, 1999, AMFM changed the longtime "Cool" oldies format to Rhythmic Oldies as "Magic 101". Rival station KCCL (now known as KHHM) would adopt the "Cool" oldies format after KHYL's flip.

=== Urban adult contemporary: 2001-2014 ===
In July 2001, the "Magic 101" branding was dropped in favor of "V101.1." After the switch, the station added R&B songs to the playlist, followed by more Rhythmic Pop tracks. KHYL made adjustments in its direction by becoming more current with Rhythmic hits and less focused on R&B and Old School product, possibly to entice younger listeners away from Rhythmic Top 40 rivals KSFM and KHHM.

=== Rhythmic contemporary: 2014-2014 ===
By August 2014, KHYL officially transitioned to rhythmic contemporary, giving Sacramento three different stations with the same format.

=== Classic hip hop: 2015-present ===
With KHYL seeing the lowest ratings of the three, it transitioned to classic hip hop on January 9, 2015.

== KHYL-HD2 ==
From 2008 to 2013, KHYL's HD2 subcarrier offered the Dance Top 40 "Club Phusion" format, which was programmed through iHeartMedia's "Format Lab." Club Phusion replaced an Urban Ballads & Love Songs format, which was launched in 2006.

In 2013, Club Phusion's successor "Evolution" took its place. A few years later, Evolution was replaced with "Big Classic Hits."
