= KOBO =

- Yuba City, California; United States
- Broadcast area: Yuba–Sutter area
- Frequency: 1450 kHz
- Branding: Punjabi Radio USA

Programming
- Format: Punjabi language

Ownership
- Owner: Punjabi American Media, LLC; (Punjabi American Media, LLC)
- Sister stations: KIID, KLHC, KWRU

History
- First air date: February 8, 1954
- Former call signs: KMYC (1941–1952); KAGR (1954–1966); KZIN (1966–1969)

Technical information
- Licensing authority: FCC
- Facility ID: 17408
- Class: C
- Power: 166 watts (day); 820 watts (night)
- Transmitter coordinates: 39°6′21.4″N 121°39′24.1″W

Links
- Public license information: Public file; LMS
- Website: punjabiradiousa.com

KOBO (1450 AM) is a Multicultural radio station, licensed to Yuba City, California. KOBO is simulcast with KIID 1470 AM, KLHC 1350 AM, KCVR 1570 AM and KWRU 1300 AM.
