= Thomas M. Sullivan =

American radio personality

Tom Sullivan is a business news anchor for the Fox Business Network, who also hosted a syndicated radio talk show formerly on the Fox News Radio network.

== Early career ==
A Seattle native, he moved to the San Francisco, California, area in the early 1970s and in 1975 was transferred to Sacramento, California, where he began his media career. Sullivan now lives in the New York City area. He spent four years as a Washington State Patrolman (1969-1973) before moving to California to pursue a career in the field of accounting with Price Waterhouse.

== Media work ==
Sullivan began his media career in Sacramento with where he worked as financial editor for both KFBK and for KCRA-TV from 1980 to 2007. At KFBK, Sullivan met and befriended fellow radio host Rush Limbaugh, and served as a regular fill-in for the talk show during its run. In 2007, Sullivan left Sacramento to host a show on the Fox Business Network. His radio show became nationally syndicated by Fox News Radio. In 2017, Tom left Fox altogether and continued his radio syndication with Talk Media Network.

== Retirement ==
In April 2025, Tom Sullivan announced his retirement from his daily radio show. In an interview with affiliate WPHM he announced plans to produce a new podcast.
