= KFSG =

- Roseville, California; United States
- Broadcast area: Sacramento metropolitan area
- Frequency: 1690 kHz
- Branding: Radio Poder

Programming
- Language: Multilingual
- Format: Religious broadcasting

Ownership
- Owner: Multicultural Broadcasting; (Way Broadcasting Licensee, LLC)

History
- First air date: 2001
- Former call signs: KSXX (1997–2003)

Technical information
- Licensing authority: FCC
- Facility ID: 87177
- Class: B
- Power: 10,000 watts (day); 1,000 watts (night)
- Transmitter coordinates: 38°44′51.6″N 121°29′36.8″W

Links
- Public license information: Public file; LMS

KFSG (1690 AM) is a radio station licensed to Roseville, California, United States, and serves the Sacramento metropolitan area. Owned by Way Broadcasting Licensee, LLC., part of New York City-based Multicultural Broadcasting, it broadcasts a brokered programming format featuring Spanish Religious and multilingual shows.

KFSG's signal can be picked up in parts of the western United States at night, beyond the Sacramento area. 1690 is a relatively clear frequency, with the closest station competing being KDMT in Arvada, Colorado, a suburb of Denver. Until the 1990s, the Federal Communications Commission did not assign AM stations dial positions above 1600 kHz, so there is only one other station in the West to interfere with KFSG's signal.

== History ==
KFSG originated as the expanded band "twin" of an existing station on the standard AM band. On March 17, 1997, the Federal Communications Commission (FCC) announced that eighty-eight stations had been given permission to move to newly available "Expanded Band" transmitting frequencies, ranging from 1610 to 1700 kHz, with KRCX (now KLIB) in Roseville authorized to move from 1110 to 1690 kHz.

A construction permit for the expanded band station was assigned the call letters KSXX on November 17, 1997. The FCC's initial policy was that both the original station and its expanded band counterpart could operate simultaneously for up to five years, after which owners would have to turn in one of the two licenses, depending on whether they preferred the new assignment or elected to remain on the original frequency. Conforming with this requirement, KLIB went silent in April 2006. However, on February 20, 2007, the FCC granted a temporary authority for KLIB to resume operations. This deadline has been extended multiple times, and both stations have remained authorized. One restriction is that the FCC has generally required paired original and expanded band stations to remain under common ownership.

On March 13, 2003, 1690 AM changed its call sign to KFSG.

== Programming ==
KFSG's religious programming is supplied by block-programmers, who purchase airtime on the station and its sister, co-located KLIB (1110 AM). Programs in Spanish, Russian and Hmong are augmented with periods of instrumental music (during unsold time periods). Vietnamese-language programming from the San Jose–based Tiếng Nước Tôi Radio Network airs weekdays from noon to 2 PM.
