= KXBX (AM) =

- Lakeport, California; United States
- Frequency: 1270 kHz
- Branding: AM 1270 and FM 96.5 KXBX

Programming
- Format: Classic hits
- Affiliations: Westwood One

Ownership
- Owner: Bicoastal Media Licenses, LLC

History
- First air date: 1966
- Former call signs: KBLC (1966–1984); KWTR (1984–1990)

Technical information
- Licensing authority: FCC
- Facility ID: 49201
- Class: D
- Power: 500 watts (day); 97 watts (night)
- Transmitter coordinates: 39°0′49.6″N 122°53′43″W
- Translator: 96.5 K243BT (Clearlake)

Links
- Public license information: Public file; LMS
- Website: kxbx.com

KXBX (1270 AM) is a radio station broadcasting a classic hits format. Licensed to Lakeport, California, United States, the station is currently owned by Bicoastal Media Licenses, LLC and features programming from Westwood One.

== History ==
The station went on the air in 1966 as KBLC. On 1984-07-16 the call letters were changed to KWTR. On 1990-09-21, the station again changed its call sign to the current KXBX.
