= KLHC =

- Bakersfield, California; United States
- Broadcast area: Bakersfield metropolitan area
- Frequency: 1350 kHz
- Branding: Punjabi Radio USA

Programming
- Format: Ethnic/Punjabi

Ownership
- Owner: Punjabi American Media, LLC
- Sister stations: KIID; KOBO; KWRU

History
- Former call signs: KLYD (1986–1989); KBAD (1989–1992); KBID (1992–2006)

Technical information
- Licensing authority: FCC
- Facility ID: 61420
- Class: D
- ERP: 1,000 watts (day); 33 watts (night)
- Transmitter coordinates: 35°20′58.9″N 118°58′52.4″W
- Translator: 107.5 K298DH (Bakersfield)

Links
- Public license information: Public file; LMS
- Website: punjabiradiousa.com

KLHC (1350 AM) is a multicultural radio station licensed to Bakersfield, California, United States, which broadcast a Punjabi format. KLHC simulcasts on KIID 1470 AM in Sacramento, KWRU 1300 AM in Fresno, and KOBO 1450 AM in Yuba City. Since 2005 the Punjabi/Indian community has increased significantly in Bakersfield. Punjabi-Americans are in trucking and small business in big numbers.

== History ==
Previous logo

The station was assigned the KLYD call letters on September 10, 1986. On October 17, 1989, the station changed its call sign to KBAD. On February 19, 1992, it changed to KBID and on January 6, 2006, to the current KLHC. Effective July 20, 2017, Punjabi American Media acquired KLHC from Centro Cristiano Vida Abundante at a purchase price of $300,000.

== Silent ==
In November 2013, Forced Broadcasting sold KLHC. The last day of La Redención on KLHC was November 30, 2013. After the last day of broadcast until December 31, 2013, Redemption did not have a radio station. Before the last day of Broadcast, La Redención had two meetings with pastors to continue transmitting their radio station. At 10:00 pm PT on December 31, 2013, La Redención, went back on the air as KRHM-LP, previously a rhythmic music-formatted station.
