= KAHI =

Radio station in Auburn, California

- Auburn, California; United States
- Broadcast area: Sacramento, California
- Frequency: 950 kHz
- Branding: FM 104.5 AM 950 KAHI

Programming
- Format: Talk radio
- Affiliations: Sacramento Kings

Ownership
- Owner: Relevant Radio, Inc.
- Operator: KAHI Corporation
- Sister stations: KSMH

History
- First air date: 1957

Technical information
- Licensing authority: FCC
- Facility ID: 48341
- Class: B
- Power: 5,000 watts
- Transmitter coordinates: 38°51′27.6″N 121°1′42.8″W
- Translator: 104.5 K283CM (Auburn)

Links
- Public license information: Public file; LMS
- Webcast: Listen live
- Website: kahi.com

KAHI (950 AM) is a radio station broadcasting a talk format. Licensed to Auburn, California, United States, the station serves the Auburn area. The station is owned by Relevant Radio; the KAHI Corporation programs the station under a time brokerage agreement. KAHI is paired with expanded band station KSMH (1620 AM), which serves as Relevant Radio's Sacramento station.

== History ==
KAHI began broadcasting in 1957, originally licensed to Placer Broadcasters for 500 watts on 950 kHz, daytime-only.

=== Expanded Band assignment ===
On March 17, 1997, the Federal Communications Commission (FCC) announced that 88 stations had been given permission to move to newly available "Expanded Band" transmitting frequencies, from 1610 to 1700 kHz. KAHI was authorized to move to 1620 kHz, and in 1998 the expanded band station began broadcasting as KSMH.

The FCC's initial plan provided that both the original station and its expanded band counterpart could optionally operate simultaneously for up to five years, after which owners would have to turn in one of the two licenses, depending on whether they preferred the new assignment or elected to remain on the original frequency. However, this deadline has been extended numerous times, and both KAHI and KSMH have remained authorized. One restriction is that the FCC has generally required paired original and expanded band stations to remain under common ownership.

== Programming ==
The station broadcasts locally produced programming, San Francisco Giants baseball, Sacramento Kings basketball, San Jose Sharks hockey, Sierra College and local high school football. When not carrying live broadcasts, KAHI carries nationally syndicated talk radio shows.

As of October 2015, the station produced several local programs that aired weekdays, including news blocks during drive time and in the noon hour, along with an evening talk show hosted by Mary Jane Popp. The station's moniker then was "The Voice of the Foothills".

KAHI carried Oakland Athletics baseball as an affiliate of the Oakland Athletics Radio Network for 57 years through 2024. Concurrent with the temporary move of the Athletics (A's) to West Sacramento as part of their relocation to Las Vegas, and the move of the team's Sacramento radio broadcasts from KHTK to KSTE, KAHI announced that it would no longer carry A's baseball. On March 12, 2025, KAHI reached a deal with the San Francisco Giants and flagship station KNBR/KNBR-FM to carry that team's games.
