= Sacramento Magazine =

Regional magazine based in Sacramento, California

- Editor: Krista Minard
- Frequency: Monthly
- Founder: Gary H. Brown; Martin Cracchiolo
- First issue: January 1975
- Final issue: August 2023
- Company: Hour Media
- Country: United States
- Based in: Sacramento, California
- Language: English
- Website: sacmag.com

Sacramento Magazine was a monthly regional magazine based in Sacramento, California, published from 1975 to 2023. The magazine had 25,000 monthly subscribers and 7,500 newsstand copies as of 2010. It was a member of the City and Regional Magazine Association.

== History ==
In January 1975, the first issue of Lifestyle magazine was published. It was a bimonthly publication billing itself as "a showcase for Sacramento." The first issue was 64-pages with articles on travel, sports, interior decorating, gardening, food, and entertainment along with a community events calendar. A 100,000 free copies were distributed at banks, hotels, motels, colleges and military bases. Following issues were $1, with an annual subscription for $4.98. The magazine's first publisher was Gary H. Brown, former real estate editor at The Sacramento Union.

The magazine was owned by Lifestyle Publishing Co., owned by Brown and Martin Cracchiolo, the company's executive vice president. It was funded by $125,000 in stock sales to a dozen family members and friends. After six issues the publication's name was changed to Sacramento Magazine. In March 1978, it expanded to a monthly and the press run was reduced to 50,000 copies. It was initially funded by real estate ads but the change in frequency helped attract general-retail advertisers.

In September 1978, multi-millionaire Ken Jonsson, of Santa Monica, bought Sacramento Magazine. He was the son of J. Erik Jonsson, a co-founder of Texas Instruments. At the time Jonsson recently bought two Sacramento radio stations, KROI-FM and its affiliate KROY-AM, along with Reno magazine. A year later Sacramento Magazine was no longer allowed to distribute free copies at 45 branches of Bank of America, which accounted for 40% of its circulation. Around that time Jonsson initiated a drive for more subscribers. The extra copies were distributed at shopping centers and businesses. It was rumored Jonsson was an absentee owner who bought media outlets as a tax shelter and Sacramento Magazine would soon close due to a drop in advertisements related to the B of A situation. Jonsson denied the gossip. He claimed he bought radio stations in Sacramento because he loved the city and then acquired Sacramento Magazine because it was exempt from Federal Communications Commission anti-monopoly rules.

Jonsson wanted to build a network of media outlets but his plans never materialized and Reno magazine folded. By 1984, the media company never realized a net profit for any fiscal year of operation. After a decade, Sacramento Magazine had never been profitable. It had an average press run of 30,000 copies, with 18,316 copies sold with 7,200 in newsstand sales. Under Jonsson, the publication's layout became more orderly, it printed on higher quality paper, added a bimontlhy business section and directories for entertainment and dining and had fewer local features. Each issue had a single article on a serious subjects but most stories had a light tone. Jonsson rarely interfere in editorial decisions.

In 1986, Jonsson sold a 90% interest in Sacramento Magazine to Norman B. Tomlinson Jr., owner of the Daily Record. Publisher Mike O'Brien owned the remaining 10% stake. In 1993, O'Brien bought out Micromedia Affiliates, of Morristown, New Jersey, to become the magazine's sole owner. In 2005, Joe Chiodo was promoted to co-publisher. At that time the magazine's audited circulation was 53,591. In 2009, the company's revenue was down 20% due to the Great Recession. Six employees were laid off, amounting to 16% of its workforce. In 2015, Hour Media LLC, based in Michigan, acquired the Sacramento Magazines Corporation from O'Brien. In August 2023, Sacramento Magazine ceased publication after 48 years in business. Its assets were acquired by the publishers of rival Sactown Magazine owned by Metropolis Publishing LLC.
