= KSTE =

- Rancho Cordova, California; United States
- Broadcast area: Sacramento metropolitan area
- Frequency: 650 kHz
- Branding: Talk 650 KSTE

Programming
- Format: Talk radio
- Network: 24/7 News
- Affiliations: Compass Media Networks; Premiere Networks; Radio America; Westwood One; Athletics

Ownership
- Owner: iHeartMedia; (iHM Licenses, LLC)
- Sister stations: KBEB; KFBK; KFBK-FM; KHYL; KYRV; KZIS

History
- First air date: April 1991
- Former call signs: KMCE (1987–1991); KRDX (1991–1992)

Technical information
- Licensing authority: FCC
- Facility ID: 22883
- Class: B
- Power: 21,400 watts (day); 920 watts (night)
- Transmitter coordinates: 38°28′46.7″N 121°16′41.8″W

Links
- Public license information: Public file; LMS
- Webcast: Listen live (via iHeartRadio)
- Website: kste.iheart.com

KSTE (650 AM) is a commercial radio station broadcasting a talk radio format. Licensed to Rancho Cordova, California, United States, the station serves the Sacramento metropolitan area. Owned by iHeartMedia, KSTE's studios are in North Sacramento near the Arden Fair Mall, while the transmitter is sited southeast of the city in Vineyard, California. KSTE is also the flagship station for the Athletics baseball team during the team's stint in West Sacramento.

The station went on the air in 1991. Initially a Spanish-language station simulcasting KRCX under the call signs KMCE and KRDX, the talk format and KSTE call sign launched in 1992 after Fuller-Jeffrey Broadcasting, which had already programmed the station, bought full control. A series of ownership changes in 1996 and 1997 put KSTE under the ownership of first American Radio Systems and then Chancellor Media; additional mergers in the late 1990s led to Clear Channel Communications, the predecessor to iHeartMedia, taking over the station in 2000. KSTE is programmed as a "second tier" talk station, secondary to KFBK and KFBK-FM. While most of the KFBK schedule is hosted by local personalities, KSTE features nationally syndicated talk shows.

== History ==
The station that today is KSTE was first planned on April 10, 1981, when Minority Communications of California filed an application for a music and talk station on 650 kHz in Rancho Cordova. Minority's principals—Mary Forbes, Paul Neuhoff, and Robert W. O'Leary—also owned WQIZ and WDWQ in St. George, South Carolina. The construction permit was given the call sign KMCE in 1987. The station signed on the air in April 1991 as a Spanish-language outlet, simulcasting KRCX (1110 AM). While still owned by Minority Communications of California, KMCE was programmed by Fuller-Jeffrey Broadcasting, owner of KRCX and KRXQ (93.7 FM) in Roseville, under a time brokerage agreement. The call sign was changed to KRDX that June.

The station was sold to Fuller-Jeffrey Broadcasting in December 1992 for $1 million; the deal was originally reached in 1991. The acquisition required a waiver of Federal Communications Commission (FCC) ownership rules because of the overlap of the signals of KMCE, KRCX, and KSRO in Santa Rosa, as well as plans to sell KRCX. Ahead of the sale's completion, in November 1992, the call sign was changed to KSTE and the format switched to news/talk, carrying ABC News Radio for hourly newscasts.

In April 1996, Fuller-Jeffrey agreed to sell KSTE to American Radio Systems (ARS) for $7.25 million; ARS was also in the process of acquiring KCTC and KYMX at the time. That June, ARS turned around and swapped KSTE, along with $33 million, to Chancellor Broadcasting—owner of KFBK, KGBY, and KHYL—in exchange for WEAT, WEAT-FM, and WOLL in West Palm Beach, Florida. The sale was completed in October 1997, by which time Chancellor Broadcasting had itself merged with Evergreen Media to form Chancellor Media.

Chancellor Media and Capstar Broadcasting announced in August 1998 that they would merge (Hicks, Muse, Tate & Furst was a major shareholder in both companies); upon the merger's completion in July 1999, the combined company was named AMFM Inc. AMFM was in turn acquired by Clear Channel Communications (forerunner to iHeartMedia) in a deal announced on October 4, 1999, and completed in August 2000. Through these ownership changes, KSTE's talk format remained in place, making it a rare radio station that, except for its first two years, has remained with the same format for its entire history.

== Programming ==
=== Armstrong & Getty ===
Jack Armstrong and Joe Getty joined KSTE in 1998 and now have one of the highest rated morning radio shows in Northern California. They can also be heard on radio stations in Los Angeles, San Francisco, Honolulu and other cities in the West. Armstrong & Getty is the only locally based weekday talk show on KSTE.

=== Sports ===
KSTE was the former home of the Sacramento River Cats baseball team, before it moved to KIFM.

On February 14, 2025, the Athletics (A's) baseball team announced that KSTE would be the team's flagship station, following their temporary move from Oakland to West Sacramento as part of their long-term relocation to Las Vegas. In addition to KSTE, games are aired on the "A's Cast" stream on iHeartRadio and on the A's Radio Network. KSTE replaced KHTK as the A's Sacramento radio outlet; the move also resulted in KAHI in Auburn and KESP in Modesto being dropped as network affiliates.
