= KBEB =

Soft adult contemporary radio station in Sacramento, California

- Sacramento, California; United States
- Broadcast area: Sacramento metropolitan area
- Frequency: 92.5 MHz (HD Radio)
- Branding: 92.5 The Breeze

Programming
- Format: Soft adult contemporary
- Subchannels: HD2: Bilingual adult contemporary "Magic"
- Affiliations: Premiere Networks

Ownership
- Owner: iHeartMedia, Inc.; (iHM Licenses, LLC)
- Sister stations: KFBK; KFBK-FM; KHYL; KSTE; KYRV; KZIS

History
- First air date: February 1947
- Former call signs: KFBK-FM (1947–1978); KAER (1978–1991); KGBY (1991–2011); KFBK-FM (2011–2014); KHLX (2014)
- Former frequencies: 96.9 MHz (1947–1958)

Technical information
- Licensing authority: FCC
- Facility ID: 10146
- Class: B
- ERP: 50,000 watts
- HAAT: 137 meters (449 ft)
- Transmitter coordinates: 38°42′26″N 121°28′33″W

Links
- Public license information: Public file; LMS
- Webcast: Listen live (via iHeartRadio)
- Website: 925thebreeze.iheart.com

KBEB (92.5 FM, "92.5 The Breeze") is a commercial radio station licensed to Sacramento, California, United States. Owned by iHeartMedia, it airs a soft adult contemporary format, with studios in North Sacramento near Arden Fair Mall and transmitter sited off West Delano Street in Elverta. KBEB broadcasts in HD Radio; the HD2 digital subchannel airs iHeartMedia's bilingual soft AC "Magic" format.

== History ==
=== KFBK-FM and KAER ===
In February 1947, the station signed on as KFBK-FM on 96.9 MHz. It was originally owned by McClatchy Newspapers, parent company of The Sacramento Bee. On January 9, 1958, the Federal Communications Commission (FCC) granted KFBK-FM's request to move the station to 92.5 MHz. For its first two decades, it largely simulcast co-owned KFBK. In the 1960s, it began playing classical music for some hours, and eventually went all-classical.

In October 1978, KFBK-FM changed its call sign to KAER. It switched to a beautiful music format, playing quarter hour sweeps of soft, instrumental cover versions of popular songs.

On July 24, 1987, McClatchy Newspapers sold KAER and KFBK to Westinghouse Broadcasting (Group W) for $19,001,000. The transaction closed in September. KAER began adding more vocals to the easy listening format in an effort to appeal to a younger demographic; eventually, the instrumentals would be dropped.

=== KGBY (1991–2011) ===
On February 26, 1991, the station began broadcasting an adult contemporary music format branded simply as "Y-92 FM, The Adult Choice". New call letters KGBY were assigned by the FCC the following month. The station was owned by AMFM Broadcasting from 1994 to 2000, then Clear Channel Communications after AMFM and Clear Channel merged. In 2000, the station briefly added a heavy number of country-based current hits, including songs by Billy Gilman, Lee Ann Womack, Lonestar, and Billy Joel. In 2001, the station re-branded itself as "Y-92.5, Today's Hits and Yesterday's Favorites" (resurrecting the slogan used by Group W in 1988 after dumping the KAER call letters). The station began using the "Best Mix in Denver" jingle package created for KIMN by JAM Creative Productions, including the "Y-92.5 KGBY, Sacramento" top-of-the-hour station identification.

In 2002 and 2003, the weekday lineup included Paul Robbins and Phil Cowan (KGBY's morning show host since the 1980s), Mary Ellen Murphy (voice-tracked from a Clear Channel station in Grand Rapids, Michigan), and Dana Hess. Evening programming varied, including a local love songs show in early 2003 and a brief stint using John Tesh's syndicated show later that same year. On November 14, 2003, Y92.5 surprised listeners by switching to an all-Christmas music format. For the next six weeks, KGBY featured to a catalog of over 300 Christmas songs ranging from staples such as Brenda Lee's "Rockin' Around the Christmas Tree" and John Lennon's "Happy Xmas (War Is Over)" (both songs were played once every four hours, on the hour) to unusual tracks such as "Light of the Stable" by Emmylou Harris. The station repeated the seasonal change in 2004 and 2005; in 2006, the all-Christmas format was reduced to four weeks.

In 2004, KGBY began making several major changes. In January, the voice-tracked Murphy was dismissed in favor of local voice Lori Sacco. The station experimented with a 92-minute commercial-free block of music weekdays at 8:30 a.m.; this was in response to KYMX's "96 minutes of music", but neither station's effort lasted more than a few months. The "Y-92.5 KGBY, Sacramento" station ID was replaced with a simpler version. By the middle of 2004, the station began evolving into a more "upbeat" mix of music. All but a few 1970s tracks were cut from the playlist, while more upbeat songs from the 1980s, 1990s, and 2000s were added. Later that year, the station, embracing Clear Channel's "Less is More" initiative, began cutting commercial times from one minute to 30 seconds. Jingles were also shortened to "Y-92.5 FM" from the original version, "Today's Hits and Yesterday's Favorites, Y-92.5 FM".

In 2005, KGBY experimented with "Extra Wide Variety" weekends, adding hundreds of unusual songs to its playlist from Friday at 3 p.m. to Monday at 5 a.m.; this was a response to the variety rock phenomenon exemplified by Jack FM. Also that year, Phil Cowan exited the station, with Paul & Phil in the Morning rebranded simply as Paul Robbins in the Morning. Accompanying this change was a new jingle package, ditching "Today's Hits and Yesterday's Favorites" in favor of their new slogan, "Sacramento's Best Music Mix, Y-92.5 FM". Further changes would come in early 2007, when afternoon host Dana Hess was dismissed in a cost-cutting move and the station returned to its earlier practice of voice-tracking, replacing him with an automated Lyman James. James went on to host a live midday show on KRBB (B98 FM) in Wichita, Kansas while holding the position of Operations Manager for iHeartMedia (as Clear Channel was renamed in September 2014).

Through all the changes at KGBY, the station's playlist emphasized many upbeat songs, including "Nothing Left To Lose" by Mat Kearney and "Wake Me Up When September Ends" by Green Day. Older titles were often rhythmic oldies (akin to those played on the Movin' stations) and include such songs as "September" by Earth, Wind & Fire and "I Can't Wait" by Nu Shooz. However, on December 26, 2007 at 6 a.m., after completing its annual all-Christmas music programming, KGBY flipped to an adult top 40 format, branded "My 92-5" and featuring a heavy emphasis on current-based hot adult contemporary (hot AC) product. The Y92 morning show ended after twenty years on the air.

=== KFBK-FM and KHLX (2011–2014) ===
On December 1, 2011 at midnight, after playing "Gives You Hell" by The All-American Rejects, KGBY began simulcasting news/talk-formatted KFBK (1530 AM) using the original call sign KFBK-FM. The move left CBS Radio's KZZO as the only hot AC station in Sacramento, but new competition arose when Entercom dropped rhythmic adult contemporary for hot AC on KBZC the following week.

After two years with news/talk, Clear Channel decided to switch the frequencies of KFBK-FM and KHLX (93.1 FM) on December 26, 2013. KHLX, which previously had a classic hits format, moved to 92.5 FM while the KFBK-FM call sign and format shifted to 93.1 FM. KHLX simulcast KFBK-AM-FM on a temporary basis as Clear Channel prepared to launch a new format at 92.5 FM.

=== KBEB (2014–present) ===
On January 10, 2014 at 5 p.m., KHLX split from its simulcast with KFBK-FM and changed its format to country, known as "B92.5". The first song on B92.5 was "The Only Way I Know" by Jason Aldean. Soon after, KHLX changed its callsign to KBEB to match its "B" branding.

On December 30, 2016, KBEB rebranded as "92.5 The Bull"; the station otherwise made no changes. The Bull launched with 92.5 hours of music commercial-free.

On November 8, 2018, iHeartMedia announced that KBEB would flip to soft adult contemporary as "92.5 The Breeze" on November 12. The "Bull" format moved to K296GB on the same date, and the signals were simulcast briefly as a means of transition between formats, akin to that of the KFBK simulcast five years prior. "The Breeze" launched on November 12 at 3 p.m.

== Christmas music ==
On November 1, 2024, KBEB switched to an all-Christmas music format, the first time the station has done so since 2007. KBEB has always played Christmas music on Christmas Eve and Christmas Day. However, at 8:52 am on November 1, 2024, KBEB played "It's the Most Wonderful Time of the Year" by Johnny Mathis, kicking off a playlist of 24/7 Christmas music. This Christmas Music directly competes with KYMX, which usually flips to Christmas music every year in November. However, this trend of flipping to Christmas music in November is not unusual for IHeartMedia-owned AC stations. Some notable examples of sister stations to KBEB who flip to Christmas music every year include WLIT-FM, WLTW, and KOST.

== HD Radio ==
KBEB broadcasts a digital HD Radio signal featuring two subchannels:

- KBEB-HD1 is a digital simulcast of the analog signal of KBEB.
- KBEB-HD2 broadcasts iHeartMedia's "Magic" format.

Originally, starting in 2006, KGBY-HD2 broadcast an all-1980s music format. The following year, the station began airing the LGBT-targeted Pride Radio channel, using music from iHeartMedia's Premium Choice service. Later, the subchannel switched to the Country Premium Choice service, airing that format until January 2014 when KHLX-HD2 flipped to a simulcast of news/talk-formatted KFBK-FM (93.1 FM). In 2024, KBEB-HD2 was relaunched with the "Magic" format.

== In popular culture ==
In the Three Stooges' 1945 short feature Micro-Phonies, KGBY was the call sign for the fictional radio station featured.

== Images ==
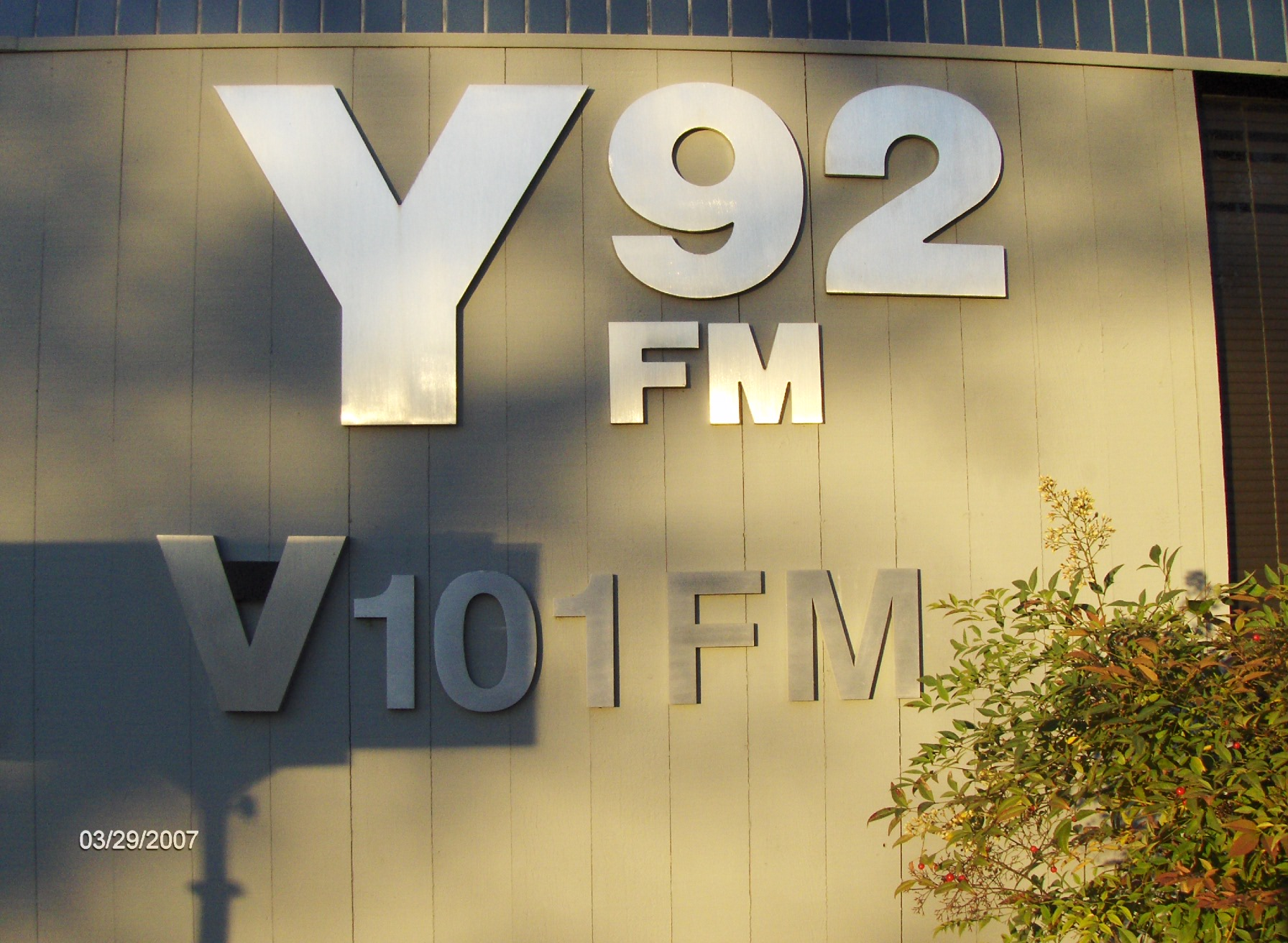
KGBY studio sign.

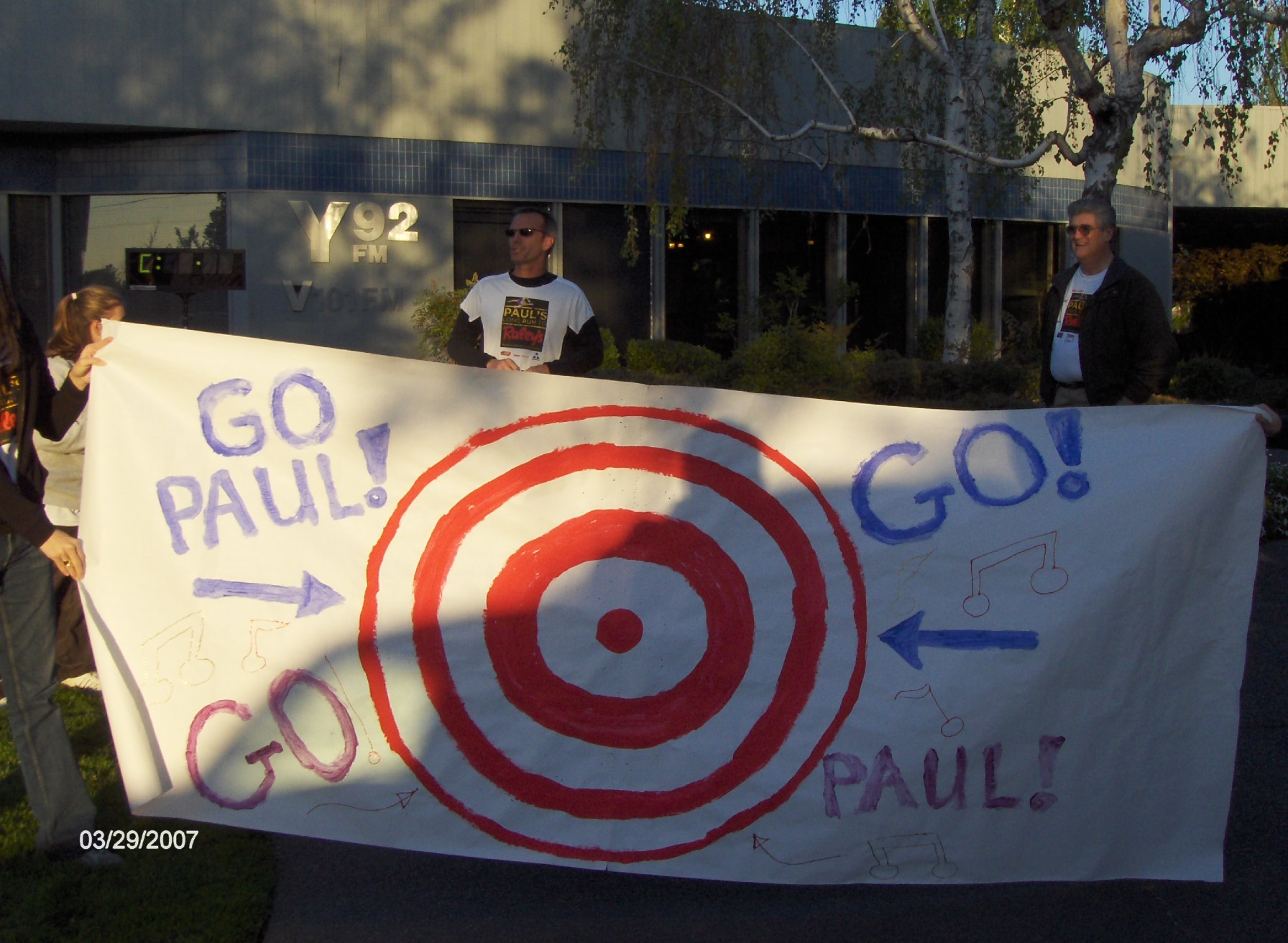
Paul Robbins prepares to break the banner at the start of his 92.5 miles charity run on March 29, 2007.
