= KCCL =

Radio station in Woodland, California

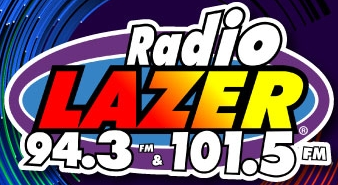
- Woodland, California; United States
- Broadcast area: Sacramento metropolitan area
- Frequency: 101.5 MHz
- Branding: Radio Lazer 94.3 & 101.5

Programming
- Format: Regional Mexican

Ownership
- Owner: Lazer Media; (Lazer Licenses, LLC)
- Sister stations: KGRB, KLMG

History
- First air date: August 30, 1996
- Former call signs: KMJE (1996–2013)
- Call sign meaning: "California's Cool"

Technical information
- Licensing authority: FCC
- Facility ID: 52516
- Class: A
- ERP: 5,700 watts
- HAAT: 100 meters (330 ft)
- Transmitter coordinates: 38°35′47.00″N 121°40′49.00″W

Links
- Public license information: Public file; LMS

KCCL (101.5 FM) is a commercial radio station licensed to Woodland, California, United States, and serving the Sacramento metropolitan area. It is owned by Lazer Media, through licensee Lazer Licenses, LLC, and broadcasts a Regional Mexican format, calling itself "Radio Lazer". Its studios and offices are in North Sacramento.

The transmitter site off Road 104 in Davis, California, near the Willow Slough.

== History ==
=== Adult contemporary: 1996–2013 ===
On August 30, 1996, the station first signed on the air. The original call sign was KMJE and it called itself "Magic 101.5." In 2003, the station branding changed to "Sunny 101.5."

On August 10, 2011, KMJE replaced KUBA on a translator at 95.5 FM. On February 11, 2013, KMJE became a simulcast of KCCL sister station. On March 14, 2013, the city of license changed from Gridley, California, to Woodland.

=== Classic hits: 2013–2023 ===
On May 30, 2013, it officially switched signals and call signs with KMJE, becoming "101.5 K-Hits," but continued to simulcast until a new format on 92.1 FM was unveiled in July 2013.

=== Regional Mexican: 2023–present ===
On February 22, 2023, Lazer Media announced the purchase of Classic Hits “101.5 K-Hits” KCCL Woodland CA from Results Radio for $1.91 million. The sale will flip to Radio Lazer as Regional Mexican format. The purchase was consummated on May 16, 2023.
