= KLMG =

Radio station in Esparto, California

- Esparto, California; United States
- Broadcast area: Sacramento, California
- Frequency: 97.9 MHz
- Branding: Latino 97.9

Programming
- Format: Spanish AC

Ownership
- Owner: Lazer Media; (Lazer Licenses, LLC)
- Sister stations: KGRB, KCCL

History
- First air date: 1996
- Former call signs: KZAC (1995–1998); KTTA (1998–2009)
- Call sign meaning: "Mega" (former branding)

Technical information
- Licensing authority: FCC
- Facility ID: 51221
- Class: A
- ERP: 6,000 watts
- HAAT: 100 meters (330 ft)
- Transmitter coordinates: 38°45′33″N 121°52′33″W

Links
- Public license information: Public file; LMS
- Webcast: Listen live
- Website: latino979.com

KLMG (97.9 FM, "La Mejor 97.9") is a radio station licensed to Esparto, California, United States. The station, which began broadcasting in 1996, was previously owned by Adelante Media Group and the broadcast license was formerly held by Bustos Media of California License, LLC. On October 21, 2014, Adelante announced that it was selling KLMG, its sister stations and its LPTV outlet in Sacramento to Lazer Broadcasting (now Lazer Media), pending FCC approval The transaction was consummated effective December 31, 2014, at a price of $2.9 million.

== Programming ==
KLMG broadcasts a Spanish AC music format to the Sacramento metropolitan area. This format is designed for the 18- to 34-year-old advertising demo and features popular Hispanic recording artists, plus "reggaetón and bachata hits". Unlike "Mega"-themed Spanish Top 40 stations in Miami, Texas and Puerto Rico, KLMG refrains from airing many English-language crossover records and instead taps into the Mexican contemporary music charts. The station targets first-generation and second-generation Hispanic adults with an upbeat presentation, even with ballads and a balance in the on-air tempo of the station.

== History ==
=== The beginning ===
This station received its original construction permit from the Federal Communications Commission on February 6, 1995. The new station was assigned the call sign KZAC by the FCC on March 17, 1995. KZAC received its license to cover from the FCC on April 23, 1996.

The station's original studios were located in the Old Sacramento State Historic Park even though its broadcast tower was located in Esparto, California, its legal city of license. When it signed on, KZAC became the fifth Spanish-language radio station to serve the greater Sacramento area.

By April 1998, the station was branded as "Radio Fiesta" and broadcast a Spanish-language adult contemporary music format aimed at the 25- to 54-year-old advertising demographic. The station's owners applied to the FCC for new call letters and received the KTTA call sign on July 6, 1998.

=== Ownership changes ===
In December 2002, original owner Pacific Spanish Network, Inc., reached an agreement to sell KTTA to Aztec Media, Inc., for a reported $7 million. KTTA had been operated by Aztec Media since July 1999 under a local marketing agreement. The deal was approved by the FCC on January 21, 2003, and the transaction was consummated on April 1, 2003.

In October 2004, Aztec Media, Inc., announced an agreement to sell this station to Bustos Media through their Bustos Media of California, LLC, subsidiary, for $15 million as part of a two-station deal valued at $21.7 million. The deal was approved by the FCC on December 15, 2004, and the transaction was consummated on January 21, 2005. Just one week later, as part of an internal corporate reorganization, Bustos Media applied to the FCC to transfer the broadcast license from Bustos Media of California, LLC, to Bustos Media of California License, LLC. The transfer was approved by the FCC on January 28, 2005, and the transaction was consummated on February 10, 2005. Founded in 2004, Bustos Media was one of the largest Spanish-language broadcasting corporations in the United States.

=== 97.9 today ===
The station's former longtime Regional Mexican music format, "La Ke Buena" branding, and KTTA calls moved to 94.3 FM in February 2009; the station is now the flagship of Adelante Media Group's "La Gran D" regional Mexican network. This station, which flipped to a Spanish-language CHR format branded as "Mega 97.9", was assigned the KLMG call sign by the FCC on February 24, 2009. In 2010, the branding shifted to "Latino 97.9" and continues today under new owner Adelante Media Group.
