= KLIB =

Coordinates: 38.7393°N 121.2149°W

- Roseville, California; United States
- Broadcast area: Sacramento, California
- Frequency: 1110 kHz

Programming
- Format: Asian radio

Ownership
- Owner: Multicultural Broadcasting; (Way Broadcasting Licensee, LLC)

History
- First air date: April 1, 1968
- Former call signs: KPOP (1967–1980); KPIP (1980–1984); KRCX (1984–1999)

Technical information
- Licensing authority: FCC
- Facility ID: 57702
- Class: B
- Power: 5,000 watts day; 500 watts night

Links
- Public license information: Public file; LMS

KLIB (1110 AM) is a radio station that broadcasts from Roseville, California, and serves Sacramento. The station broadcasts to the Asian community, and is owned by Multicultural Radio Broadcasting. The transmitter's broadcast power is 5,000 watts daytime, 500 watts nighttime.

== History ==
The station was first licensed in 1968 as KPOP, located in Roseville and using 500 watts on 1110 kHz. On June 23, 1980, the call sign was changed to KPIP, and on January 24, 1984, the call letters became KRCX.

=== Expanded band assignment ===
On March 17, 1997, the Federal Communications Commission (FCC) announced that 88 stations had been given permission to move to newly available "Expanded Band" transmitting frequencies, ranging from 1610 to 1700 kHz, with KRCX authorized to move from 1110 to 1690 kHz.

A Construction Permit for the expanded band station was assigned the call letters KSXX (now KFSG) on November 17, 1997. The FCC's initial policy was that both the original station and its expanded band counterpart could operate simultaneously for up to five years, after which owners would have to turn in one of the two licenses, depending on whether they preferred the new assignment or elected to remain on the original frequency. Conforming with this requirement, KLIB went silent in April 2006, and removed its directional phasing equipment, but also filed a request to retain both licenses. On February 20, 2007, the FCC granted a temporary authority to resume operations using a lower power non-directional antenna pending the final disposition of the expanded band license issue. This deadline has been extended multiple times, and both stations have remained authorized. One restriction is that the FCC has generally required paired original and expanded band stations to remain under common ownership.
