= KFBK (AM) =

Clear-channel news/talk radio station in Sacramento, California

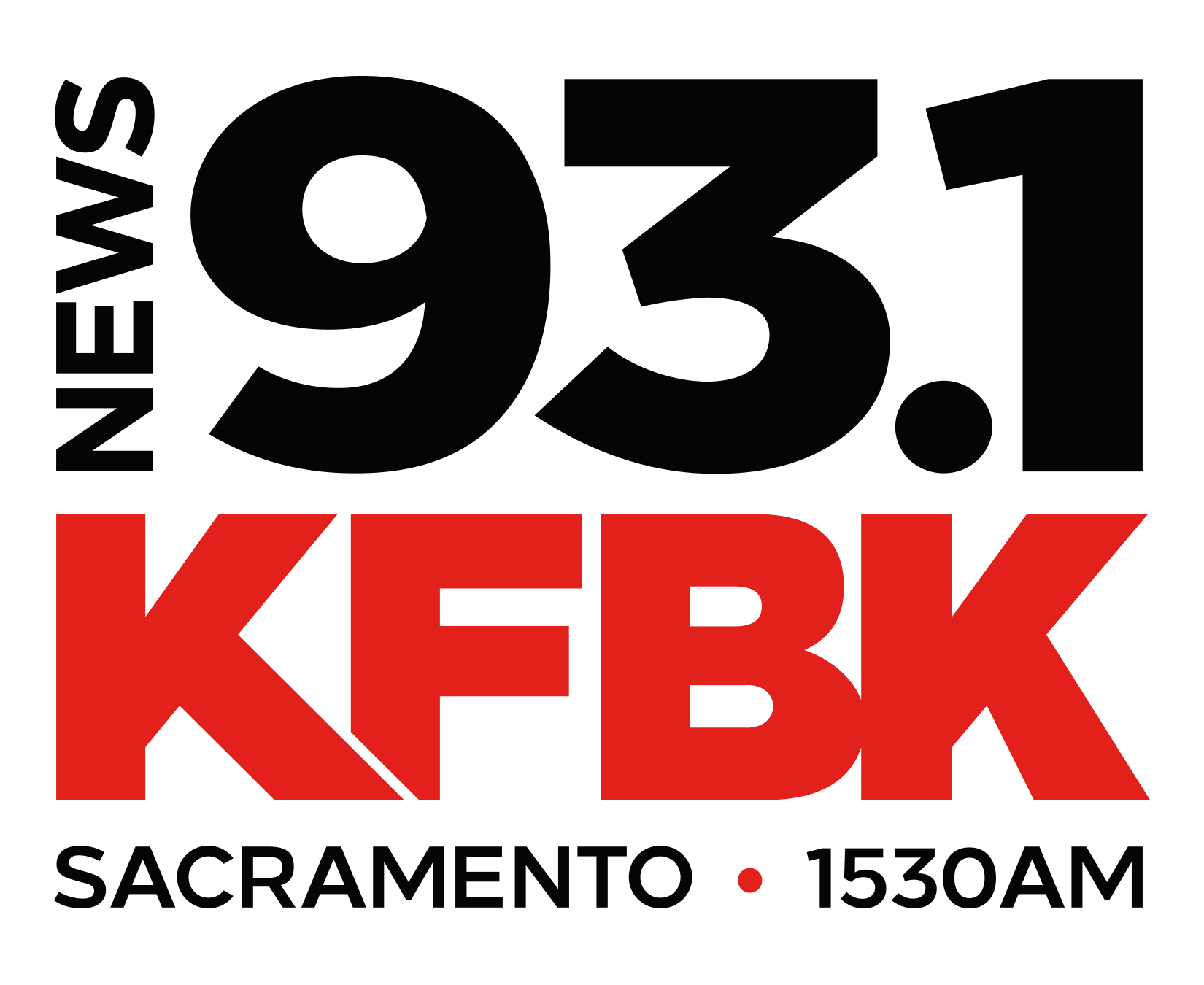
- Sacramento, California; United States
- Broadcast area: Sacramento–Stockton, California
- Frequency: 1530 kHz
- Branding: KFBK News Radio

Programming
- Format: News–talk
- Affiliations: ABC News Radio; KXTV; Compass Media Networks; Premiere Networks

Ownership
- Owner: iHeartMedia, Inc.; (iHM Licenses, LLC)
- Sister stations: KBEB; KFBK-FM; KHYL; KSTE; KYRV; KZIS

History
- First air date: September 17, 1922
- Former frequencies: 833 kHz (1922–1923); 1060 kHz (1923–1925); 1210 kHz (1925–1926); 535 kHz (1926–1927); 560 kHz (1927–1928); 1310 kHz (1928–1936); 1490 kHz (1936–1941)

Technical information
- Licensing authority: FCC
- Facility ID: 10145
- Class: A
- Power: 50,000 watts
- Transmitter coordinates: 38°50′53.63″N 121°29′1.85″W
- Repeaters: 93.1 KFBK-FM (Pollock Pines); 92.5 KBEB-HD2 (Sacramento)

Links
- Public license information: Public file; LMS
- Webcast: Listen live (via iHeartRadio)
- Website: kfbk.iheart.com

KFBK (1530 kHz) is a commercial AM radio station in Sacramento, California. It is simulcast on KFBK-FM 93.1 MHz. KFBK-AM-FM air a news-talk radio format and are owned by iHeartMedia, Inc. The studios and offices are on River Park Drive in North Sacramento, near the Arden Fair Mall.

KFBK is a Class A radio station. Its 50,000-watt transmitter is on Pleasant Grove Road at Catlett Road in Pleasant Grove. Because KFBK shares AM 1530 with another Class A station, WCKY in Cincinnati, KFBK uses a directional antenna, which operates with separate day and night parameters and has the highest field strength of any AM station in the United States. The daytime signal covers much of Northern California, from the northern Sacramento Valley to the San Francisco Bay Area and the Central Valley. At night, it reaches much of the Western United States and Western Canada.

== Programming ==
iHeart owns three talk stations in the Sacramento metropolitan area, KFBK-AM-FM, which air mostly local shows and news blocks on weekdays, and KSTE, which carries mostly syndicated conservative talk shows. Weekdays on KFBK-AM-FM begin with "The KFBK Morning News" with Cristina Mendonsa, followed by Clay Travis & Buck Sexton, Sam Shane, John McGinness and "The Afternoon News with Kitty O'Neal". At night, after the local "Pat Walsh Show", two syndicated shows are heard: Coast to Coast AM with George Noory and This Morning, America's First News with Gordon Deal.

Weekends feature shows on money, health, the outdoors, guns, car repair and travel, some of which are paid brokered programming. Some weekday shows are repeated on weekends. ABC News Radio begins most hours nights and weekends.

== History ==
=== Earlier activities ===
According to official government records, KFBK's first license was granted in August 1922. However, the station has in some cases included as part of its history an earlier Sacramento station, KVQ, which began broadcasting in February 1922.

KVQ received its initial license, as Sacramento's first broadcasting station, on December 9, 1921, issued to J. C. Hobrecht. It was operated in conjunction with the Sacramento Bee newspaper, and made its debut broadcast on February 2, 1922. A few months later, ownership was transferred from J. C. Hobrecht to the Bee's publisher, James McClatchy, followed a short time later by a transfer to "Sacramento Bee (James McClatchy Co.)". However, KVQ suspended operations on December 20, 1922, and was formally deleted on January 2, 1923. Early reviews in the Sacramento Bee treated KVQ as a separate station from the later KFBK, and government regulators at the time consistently considered the two to be separate, unrelated stations.

=== Early history ===
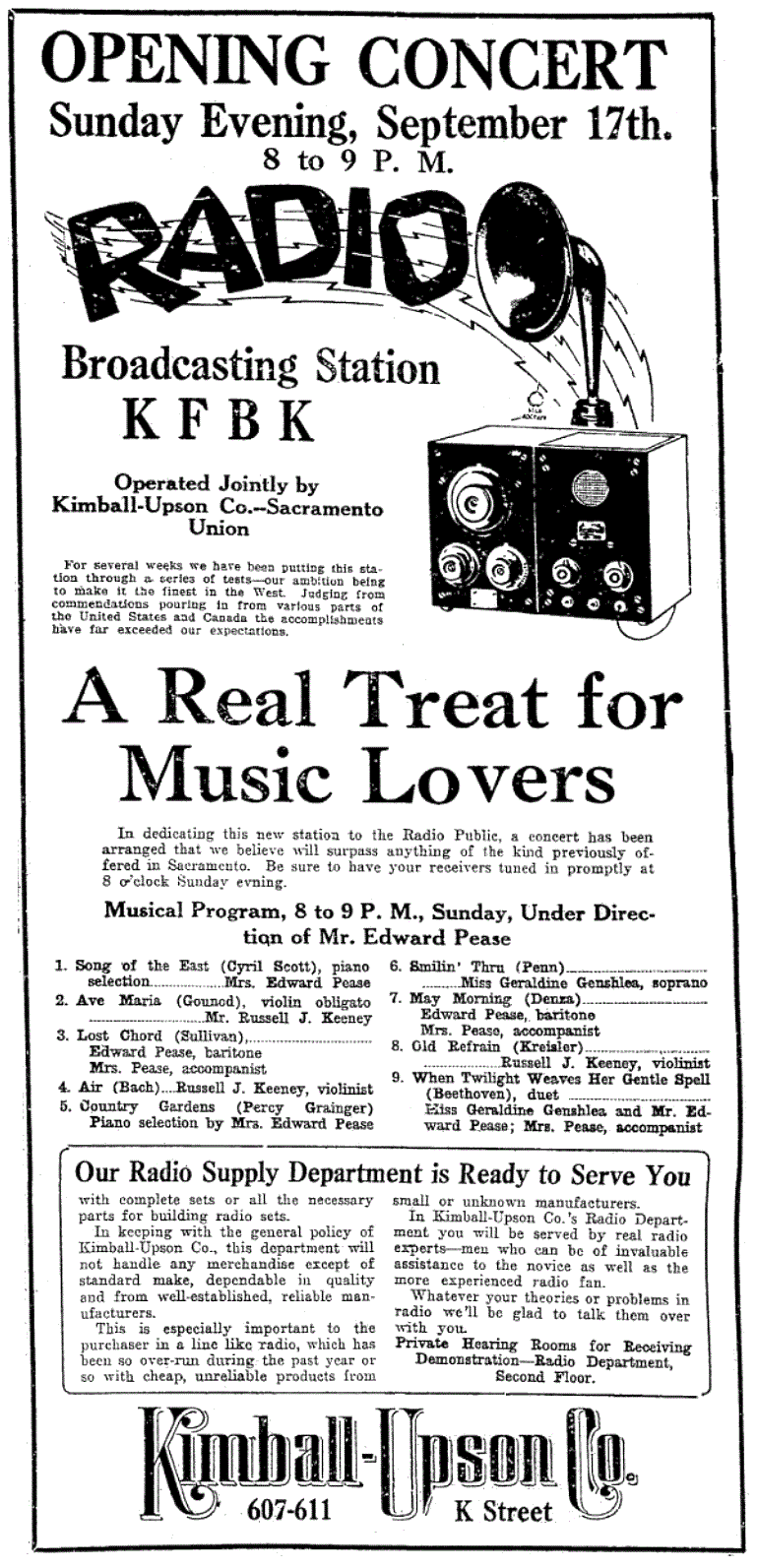
Following a series of test transmissions, KFBK held its formal debut broadcast on September 17, 1922.

KFBK was first licensed, as the city's second broadcasting station, on August 16, 1922, to the Kimball-Upson Company, and initially was operated in conjunction with the Bee's primary competitor, the Sacramento Union. The call letters were sequentially assigned from an alphabetic list maintained by the Department of Commerce, which regulated radio in the United States at this time. KFBK began test transmissions in early September, and made its formal debut broadcast on September 17, 1922.

Initially there was only a single wavelength, 360 meters (833 kHz), available for radio station "entertainment" broadcasts, which required stations in various regions to develop timesharing agreements assigning operating hours. As of November 1, 1922, there were seven "Inland Stations" sharing time on 360 meters, with KFBK allocated 6:00 to 6:30 P.M. daily except Sunday, plus 8:00 to 9:00 P.M. Thursdays and 8:00 to 10:00 P.M. Sundays.

In May 1923 the Department of Commerce greatly expanded the number of broadcasting station frequencies, and later that year KFBK was assigned unlimited use of 1060 kHz. A series of reassignments followed, until November 11, 1928, when, under the provisions of Commerce's General Order 40, the station was assigned to a low-powered "Local" frequency, 1310 kHz.

As was true with most stations in the early 1920s, KFBK was initially operated without advertising, and was primarily used for publicity purposes. The Sacramento Union eventually ended its close association with the station. In 1925 the Sacramento Bee saw this as an opportunity to re-enter the broadcasting field which it had left nearly three years earlier when it had shut down KVQ, but now on a commercial basis. Effective September 1, 1925, the James McClatchy Company, a local, family-owned company which owned the Sacramento Bee, Modesto Bee and Fresno Bee newspapers, made an agreement with station owner Kimball-Upson for a half interest in KFBK's equipment and good will. The Kimball-Upson company was granted a $3,000 credit for advertisements placed in the Bee, while the newspaper company agreed to enlarge the station's studio and pay for KFBK's operating and maintenance expenses. As part of this arrangement, McClatchy assumed control over all airtime sales at the station, with net profits up to $6,000 shared equally between the two partners, and 80% of any higher profits going to McClatchy. The station's new status was formally introduced by a special broadcast made on September 5, 1925.

In early 1929, ownership of KFBK was transferred from Kimball-Upson to the James McClatchy Company. McClatchy later acquired additional radio stations in the region, including KBEE in Modesto and KMJ in Fresno. From 1964 to 1978, KFBK was a sister station to Sacramento-Stockton-Modesto TV station KOVR. The cluster of KFBK, KBEE and KOVR was possible because Sacramento and Modesto, then as now, are separate radio markets. In the 1950's, McClatchy also owned KMJ (AM, FM, TV) Fresno, KOH Reno, and KERN Bakersfield (White's Radio log et al).

In 1936 KFBK was granted permission to make a major upgrade, going from 100 watts on 1310 kHz to 5,000 watts on the "High Powered Regional" frequency of 1490 kHz, which had previously been exclusively assigned to WCKY in Cincinnati, Ohio. In 1937 KFBK increased power again, to 10,000 watts. In March 1941, under the provisions of the North American Regional Broadcasting Agreement, KFBK and WCKY shifted to 1530 kHz, a frequency designated as a "Clear Channel" assignment, with both stations now classified as "Class I-B". On October 2, 1948, KFBK increased its power to 50,000 watts, concurrent with the installation of a directional antenna to limit its signal toward WCKY.

=== 1950s and 1960s ===
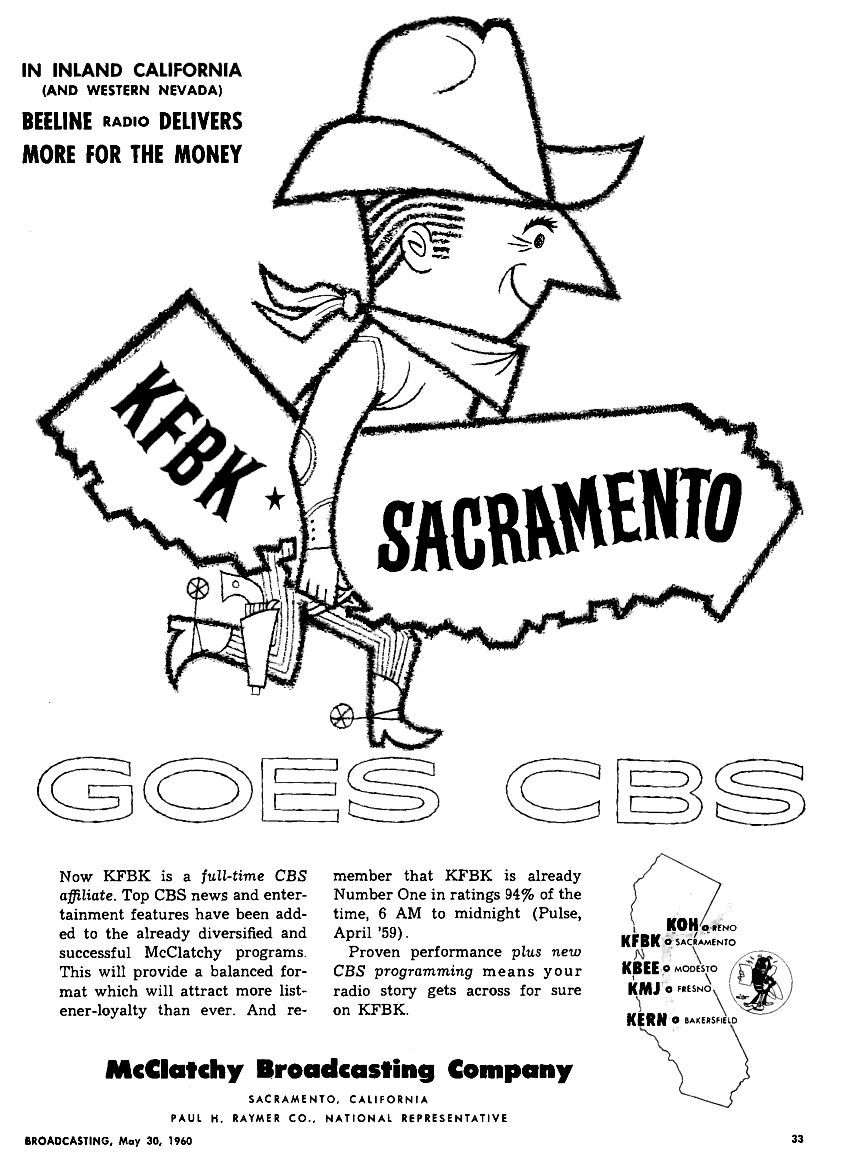
In January 1960, KFBK became a CBS radio affiliate.

As television took over network programming, KFBK reinvented itself as a news, information, sports, and entertainment station. Because of its strong signal and location in the heart of the Central Valley, the station became the chief source for farmers to obtain weather reports and price and other farming information. Beginning on January 4, 1960, KFBK carried CBS Radio Network programming, including top-of-the-hour newscasts, plus specialized reports from Edward R. Murrow and Lowell Thomas. Local news programs included the Richfield Reporter. Tony Koester was both the long-time voice of the minor league Sacramento Solons and the station's sports director. When the San Francisco Giants arrived in 1958, the station began a long partnership carrying their games. Entertainment programming included Arthur Godfrey and Doug Pledger.

=== The talk of the town ===
In the 1970s, with less network programming available, KFBK began programming talk shows as part of their broadcast day, promoting them as "The Talk of the Town". After a brief trial as an adult contemporary music station, ownership committed themselves to a format that included news blocks during morning and afternoon drive time, with the remainder of the day's programming featuring local talk shows. With the U.S. Federal Communications Commission implementing a newspaper-broadcasting cross-ownership rule, McClatchy was forced to divest itself of its radio and television stations. KFBK was sold to Westinghouse Broadcasting and later shifted network affiliation to ABC Radio.

=== KFBK begins FM simulcasting ===
KFBK-FM began simulcasting KFBK on December 1, 2011, at 92.5 FM, the former home of KGBY. This was mainly to fill in areas east of Sacramento where the AM signal is weaker at night due to the need to protect WCKY (Cincinnati, OH). Beginning December 26, 2013, KFBK briefly operated a trimulcast, adding 93.1 FM, the former home of "Classic 93.1" (KHLX); this ended a week later when KGBY adopted a country music format as KBEB.

=== Ownership changes ===
KFBK was acquired by Chancellor Media in 1997. Chancellor was acquired by Clear Channel Communications a few years later; in September 2014, Clear Channel changed its name to iHeartMedia, Inc.

== Prominent staff members ==
During the 1980s, KFBK employed Morton Downey, Jr. as a local midday host. Downey later went on to host a popular nationally syndicated weekday TV show. After Downey's departure, Rush Limbaugh replaced him at the station in 1984. Limbaugh first rose to prominence at KFBK before becoming nationally syndicated in 1988. His national program aired until his death live on KFBK in the same time slot (9:00 a.m.–noon) where he hosted locally, and transitioned to Premiere Radio Networks' official replacement, The Clay Travis and Buck Sexton Show, when it launched in June 2021.

Limbaugh's local replacement, Tom Sullivan later gained national syndication. For a time, he also worked for the Fox Business Network. Sullivan continued to be heard on KFBK weekday afternoons, until he retired in 2025.

A number of other KFBK alumni have gained national prominence. Former KFBK news reporter/anchor Laura Ingle is a featured reporter on Fox News Channel. Former KFBK reporter and weekend anchor Todd Starnes hosted a weekday show on Fox News Radio and currently owns a radio station in Memphis, Tennessee. Former KFBK evening host Spencer Hughes hosted a weekday program, Fox Across America, on Fox News Radio.
