= KGRB (FM) =

Radio station in Jackson, California

- Jackson, California; United States
- Broadcast area: Sacramento, California
- Frequency: 94.3 MHz
- Branding: Radio Lazer 94.3

Programming
- Format: Regional Mexican

Ownership
- Owner: Lazer Media; (Lazer Licenses, LLC)
- Sister stations: KLMG, KCCL

History
- First air date: 1973
- Former call signs: KNGT (1973–2003); KOSL (2003–2005); KSFS (2005); KLMG (2005–2009); KTTA (2009–2010)

Technical information
- Licensing authority: FCC
- Facility ID: 24464
- Class: B1
- ERP: 4,300 watts
- HAAT: 241 meters (791 ft)
- Transmitter coordinates: 38°24′10″N 120°39′15″W

Links
- Public license information: Public file; LMS

KGRB (94.3 FM, "Radio Lazer 94.3") is a radio station broadcasting a Regional Mexican format. It is licensed to Jackson, California, United States, and serves the Sacramento, California, area. The station used to be owned by Adelante Media Group, LLC. On October 21, 2014, Adelante announced that it was selling KGRB, its sister stations and its LPTV outlet in Sacramento to Lazer Broadcasting (now Lazer Media), pending FCC approval. The transaction was consummated effective December 31, 2014, at a price of $2.9 million.

== History ==
The station used to be called "Magia 94.3". The call letters KLMG have been moved to 97.9 FM at Esparto, California.

Previous owners include Salem Communications and Univision Communications. Salem sold the station to Bustos Media in 2006, who conveyed it to Adelante Media Group in 2010.
