= KWRU =

- Fresno, California; United States
- Broadcast area: Fresno area
- Frequency: 1300 kHz
- Branding: Punjabi Radio USA

Programming
- Language: Punjabi
- Format: Punjabi language

Ownership
- Owner: Punjabi American Media, LLC; (Punjabi American Media LLC)
- Sister stations: KIID, KOBO, KLHC

History
- First air date: October 1947
- Former call signs: KYNO (1947–2010)

Technical information
- Licensing authority: FCC
- Facility ID: 65774
- Class: B
- Power: 5,000 watts (day); 1,000 watts (night)
- Transmitter coordinates: 36°46′13.8″N 119°45′3.5″W
- Translator: 104.5 K283CY (Fresno)

Links
- Public license information: Public file; LMS
- Webcast: Listen live
- Website: punjabiradiousa.com

KWRU (1300 AM) is a commercial radio station licensed to Fresno, California, United States. The station broadcasts a Punjabi language format of music, news and talk. It is owned by Punjabi American Media LLC. Most California Sikhs /Punjabi live in the north and Central Valley, where they've had a presence for more than 100 years. "Central California is probably the most densely populated Sikh/Punjabi community.

KWRU carries the Punjabi Radio USA network, based in San Jose, California, and heard in about a dozen West Coast cities.

== History ==
The station first signed on in October 1947. Through the 1960s and 70s, it was KYNO, a popular Top 40 outlet, owned by Gene Chenault and programmed by Bill Drake, pioneers in the "Boss Radio" sound that sparked Top 40 stations in Los Angeles, San Francisco, San Diego and other cities.

In 1980 the station was sold to Spanish Catholic Radio of Fresno, offering Spanish-language religious programming.

KWRU formerly aired programming from Radio Vida Abundante, a Spanish-language Evangelical Christian network. The station was owned by Multicultural Radio Broadcasting Licensee, LLC. Multicultural Broadcasting, owned by Arthur Liu of New York City, sold the station to Punjabi American Media in September 2016.
