= KIID =

Punjabi-language radio station in Sacramento, California, United States

- Sacramento, California; United States
- Broadcast area: Sacramento metropolitan area
- Frequency: 1470 kHz
- Branding: Punjabi Radio USA

Programming
- Language: Punjabi
- Format: Punjabi

Ownership
- Owner: Punjabi American Media, LLC

History
- First air date: May 15, 1945
- Former call signs: KXOA (1945–1971); KNDE (1971–1978); KXOA (1978–1997); KQPT (1997–1998); KOME (1998–1999); KRAK (1999–2001)
- Former frequencies: 1490 kHz (1945-1948)
- Call sign meaning: Kid Radio (former format)

Technical information
- Licensing authority: FCC
- Facility ID: 65482
- Class: B
- Power: 5,000 watts (day); 1,000 watts (night)
- Transmitter coordinates: 38°35′29.7″N 121°27′49.8″W
- Translator: 105.9 K290CT (Elk Grove)
- Repeaters: 1300 KWRU (Fresno); 1350 KLHC (Bakersfield); 1450 KOBO (Yuba City)

Links
- Public license information: Public file; LMS
- Website: www.punjabiradiousa.com

KIID (1470 AM) is a radio station licensed to Sacramento, California, United States. The station is owned by Punjabi American Media LLC.

It is simulcast with 1450 AM KOBO (Yuba City), KWRU 1300 AM (Fresno) and KLHC 1350 AM (Bakersfield).

== History ==
=== KXOA ===
Lincoln Dellar put KXOA on the air on May 15, 1945, at 1490 kHz, alongside an FM outlet at 107.9 MHz. KXOA, Sacramento's fourth radio station, broadcast with 250 watts and was an affiliate of the Don Lee Network and Mutual Broadcasting System. Dellar sold the station in 1946, to Sacramento Broadcasters; the new owners were approved to relocate the station to 1470 kHz with 1,000 watts in 1948. Cal-Val Radio acquired KXOA in 1958, and increased the station's power to 5,000 watts during the day in 1960.

In the late 1950s, KXOA switched to a Top 40 format, fiercely competing with KROY (1240 AM) once that station flipped to the format in 1960. A young Don Imus was hired away from Stockton station KJOY in 1970, to do morning drive; he quickly left for Cleveland's WGAR. In May 1970, KXOA changed its format to a blend of adult contemporary and oldies, with the slogan of "Let the Sound Shine In". KXOA and KXOA-FM were sold to separate owners at the end of 1970, and while the FM station kept the call letters, the AM station, sold to Mediacast, Inc., had to change and became KNDE, changing its format to progressive rock. The Progressive Rock format lasted until the Spring of 1973, when the station evolved into a Top 40 format. 1470 AM was sold back to KXOA-FM, Inc., in 1978, and regained its KXOA call letters as a result. The station flipped formats to Album-Oriented Rock in late September 1978 but became Top 40 once again by August 1979. By 1980, KXOA had moved to oldies as "14K", and in 1982, it began broadcasting the Music of Your Life syndicated format. The station changed to business news in 1988, and then returned to oldies in 1990, as "Cruisin 1470".

=== Changes and sale to Radio Disney ===
The callsign was changed to KQPT on April 15, 1997, to KOME on July 16, 1998, to KRAK on January 15, 1999, and finally to KIID on February 19, 2001. along with the sale to The Walt Disney Company and switch to the Radio Disney format on March 2, 2001, at midnight, (after a period of simulcasting then-sister KNCI that began on October 16, 2000).

On July 15, 2009, two of the three radio towers KIID broadcasts from were destroyed due to a fire at the transmitter site. Towers 1 (center) and 2 (eastern) were destroyed. All three towers were replaced by towers of shorter height. This replacement allowed the licensee to petition for eliminating the requirement for painting and lighting the towers.

=== Sale to Punjabi American Media ===
On August 13, 2014, Disney put KIID and twenty-two other Radio Disney stations up for sale, to focus on digital distribution of the Radio Disney network. Disney originally planned to temporarily shut down the station on September 26, 2014. However, it remained on the air and continued carrying Radio Disney programming until it was sold.

On June 29, 2015, Radio Disney Sacramento filed an application to sell KIID to Punjabi American Media. It was approved by the FCC on August 26, 2015. The sale was completed on September 25, 2015, at a purchase price of $800,000.
