= KKFS =

KKFS may refer to:

- KSAI (FM), a radio station (99.5 FM) licensed to Citrus Heights, California, United States, which held the call sign KKFS from February to April 2025
- KLVB (FM), a radio station (103.9 FM) licensed to Lincoln, California, which held the call sign KKFS from 2005 to 2025
- KSAC-FM, a radio station (105.5 FM) licensed to Dunnigan, California, which held the call sign KKFS from 2001 to 2005
