= KMJE =

KMJE may refer to:

- KVMX-FM, a radio station (92.1 FM) licensed to serve Placerville, California, United States, which held the call sign KMJE or KMJE-FM from 2013 to 2019
- KSAC (AM), a radio station (890 AM) licensed to serve Olivehurst, California, which held the call sign KMJE from 2014 to 2017
- KCCL, a radio station (101.5 FM) licensed to serve Woodland, California, which held the call sign KMJE from 1996 to 2013
