= KLVB =

KLVB may refer to:

- KLVB (FM), a radio station (103.9 FM) licensed to Lincoln, California, United States
- KSAI (FM), a radio station (99.5 FM) licensed to Citrus Heights, California, which held the call sign KLVB from 2010 to 2025
- KNVE (FM), a radio station (91.3 FM) licensed to Redding, California, which held the call sign KLVB in 2010
- KKRO, a radio station (102.7 FM) licensed to Red Bluff, California, which held the call signs KLVB-FM and KLVB from 2000 to 2010
- KARQ (FM), a radio station (88.5 FM) licensed to San Luis Obispo, California, which held the call sign KLVB-FM in 1999
- KEZX, a radio station (730 AM) formerly licensed to Medford, Oregon, United States, which held the call sign KLVB from 1997 to 2003
