= KSAC =

KSAC may refer to:

- the ICAO code for Sacramento Executive Airport
- Kingston and St. Andrew Corporation, Jamaica
- KSAC (AM), a radio station (890 AM) licensed to serve Olivehurst, California, United States
- KSAC-FM, a radio station in Sacramento, California
- KCVV, a radio station (1240 AM) licensed to serve Sacrament, California, which held the call sign KSAC from 1985 to 1994 and from 2005 to 2008
- KKSU (AM), a former radio station in Manhattan, Kansas, United States that used the KSAC call from 1924 to 1984
- Potassium thioacetate (KSAc).
