= KVMX =

KVMX may refer to:

- KVMX-FM, a radio station (92.1 FM) licensed to serve Placerville, California, United States
- KSAC (AM), a radio station (890 AM) licensed to serve Olivehurst, California, which held the call sign KVMX from 2017 to 2024
- KQKZ, a radio station (92.1 FM) licensed to serve Bakersfield, California, which held the call sign KVMX from 2011 to 2016
- KPSL-FM, a radio station (96.5 FM) licensed to serve Bakersfield, California, which held the call sign KVMX from 2008 to 2011
- KXJM, a radio station (107.5 FM) licensed to serve Banks, Oregon, United States, which held the call sign KVMX from 2000 to 2008
- KABW, a radio station (95.1 FM) licensed to serve Baird, Texas, United States, which held the call sign KVMX from 1981 to 1999
