= KDPP =

KDPP may refer to:

- Kurdish Democratic Progressive Party, a Syrian Kurdish political party
- KSAC (AM), a radio station whose former callsign was "KDPP"
