= Ed Newton =

American custom car builder

Ed Newton (nicknamed "Newt") is an American custom car builder.

Newton designed the Panthermobile (with Bill "Leadslinger" Hines and Joe Baillon), as well as "Big Daddy" Roth's customs Orbitron and Surfite, among others.

== Sources ==
- Dunn, Matthew (November 14, 2016). "World's most flamboyant vehicle restored to former glory". news.com.au.
- (retrieved 06 June 2021)
