= KFIA =

KFIA may refer to:

- KFIA (AM), a radio station broadcasting in Carmichael, California
- Korea Financial Investment Association, a South Korean non-profit, self-regulatory organization
- King Fahd International Airport, abbreviated to KFIA, an airport in Dammam, Saudi Arabia
