= KSAC-FM =

Coordinates: 38.788°N 122.116°W

Simulcasting KVMX-FM, Placerville
- Dunnigan, California; United States
- Broadcast area: Sacramento, California
- Frequency: 105.5 MHz
- Branding: La Ranchera 105.5 y 92.1 SuperStation

Programming
- Format: Regional Mexican

Ownership
- Owner: Lotus Communications; (Lotus Sacramento Corp.)
- Sister stations: KSAC, KVMX-FM

History
- First air date: 1982
- Former call signs: KIQS-FM (1982–1996); KLNA (1996–2001); KKFS (2001–2005); KVMG (2005); KTKZ-FM (2005–2008); KXMX-FM (2008)
- Call sign meaning: Sacramento

Technical information
- Licensing authority: FCC
- Facility ID: 51220
- Class: B1
- ERP: 2,550 watts
- HAAT: 308 meters (1,010 ft)

Links
- Public license information: Public file; LMS
- Webcast: Listen live
- Website: www.radiolaranchera.net

KSAC-FM (105.5 MHz, "La Ranchera") is a ranchera-leaning regional Mexican radio station based in Sacramento, California, United States. The station is licensed to the community of Dunnigan, California and is owned by Lotus Communications.

== History ==
The 105.5 signal made its debut in 1982 with the call letters KIQS-FM and was assigned to Willows, California, until its move to Dunnigan in 1995 so it can target the Sacramento area. During the move, its owners sold the station to Pacific Spanish Network, who in 1996 changed the call letters to KLNA and broadcast a Spanish Contemporary format.

In 1998, the station flipped to a Top 40/dance format as "Power 105". However, this attempt to bring a dance format to Sacramento was hampered by its signal coverage from the northwestern area, a lack of advertising support and struggling ratings. It also had tough competition from KSFM, KBMB and KDND as well.

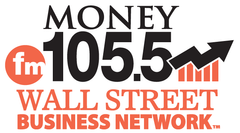
Logo as business station "Money 105.5"

On May 4, 2001, Salem bought KLNA and immediately replaced the dance format with a temporary simulcast of KFIA before putting in place Christian Contemporary as "105.5 The Fish". KKFS. But this attempt also had mixed results in its four years of existence, and in 2005 became KTKZ-FM, a simulcast of AM sister station KTKZ after Salem relocated KKFS to 103.9 FM. In 2008 Salem flipped KTKZ-FM to its Spanish Christian "Radio Luz" format and changed the call letters to KXMX-FM. On December 30, 2010, it would adopt a business news/talk format and become KSAC-FM.

On July 17, 2023, Salem announced that KSAC-FM would be sold to Lotus Communications for $1 million. On August 1, 2023, Lotus began operating KSAC-FM under a time brokerage agreement and changed the station's format from business news/talk to a simulcast of Lotus' ranchera-formatted stations KVMX 890 AM Olivehurst and KVMX-FM 92.1 Placerville. On November 13, KVMX 890 AM and its translator 104.7 Sacramento split from the Regional Mexican trimulcast with KVMX-FM 92.1 being the simulcaster for KSAC-FM. On December 21, Lotus closed in on the purchase of KSAC-FM.
