= Bill Hines =

American custom car builder (1922–2016)

William Chandler Hines (23 March 1922 – 20 May 2016), also known as "The Leadslinger", was an American custom car builder.

== Early life ==
Hines was born in Erie, Pennsylvania, to Edward and Willie (Chandler) Hines. He had a twin brother, Edward, and a sister Elizabeth.

Born with a severely deformed spine, the result of spinal kyphosis, he was unable to stand completely upright. At age two, he was sent to an Erie hospital, where he underwent surgery to remove two vertebrae. The hospital recommended he be sent to a special camp, where he was laid on a board in the sun all day for seven months, returning over the course of two and a half years; it helped relieve the unusual curvature.

Soon after Hines was initially released from hospital, his father died of tuberculosis. Hines' mother moved to Detroit, Michigan to work, while her children were sent to be raised by their grandmother in Jackson, Tennessee. In 1932, the Hines children went to Detroit.

== Career ==
In high school, Hines preferred art and shop classes to academics, and 1941, while in Grade 11, dropped out to rent a garage in Ecorse, Michigan, where he set up a custom shop. It was there he began working with lead body filler.

His first project was a 1934 Ford, fitted with a flathead V8 with milled heads. He opened a gas station in Lincoln Park, Michigan, with an attached custom shop later the same year. His first custom, built in 1941, was a 1941 Buick, with molded fenders, widened rocker panels, cut-down doors (a Hines trademark), fender skirts, Appleton spotlight, and single-bar flipper hubcaps; he repainted the original turquoise to red, claiming every custom should be red with a white interior. He would later add a tailfin in the center of the trunklid, a feature earning so much ridicule, he changed back to a stock lid.

He went on to build and race a midget powered by a 60 hp (45 kW) flathead.

In the late 1940s, Hines did bodywork and painting for Vick Sawitskas' Nash dealership in Wyandotte, Michigan.

Hines finally opened his own dedicated custom shop in Lincoln Park early in the 1950s. It was there in 1957 he built Lil' Bat, a 1950 Ford with a 6 in (150 mm) chop, frenched headlights, the grille bar from a 1951 Ford Meteor, and large fins fitted with taillights from a 1956 Ford. The car made its debut at the 1959 Detroit Autorama, and was featured on the cover of Rod & Custom Magazine in March 1959. When he visited George Barris' shop driving this car in 1958, Barris' shop manager, Gene Simmons (not to be confused with the artist), hired him immediately on the strength of the work.

Hines moved back to Detroit just before Christmas 1959,. setting up shop where he did several custom jobs and specialized in candy paint jobs. He also hired the Alexander brothers.

He served as mentor to customizers Richard Sawitskas, better known as Dick Dean, and Detroit's Alexander Brothers.

Hines returned to California in October 1960, setting up Bill Hines Kustom Auto in Lynwood, next door to Eddie Martinez's shop.

In 1962, Hines installed one of the first hydraulic lift systems on Tats Gotanda's Candy blue 1959 Chevrolet Impala; this became known as the Buddah Buggy, and was Hines' most famous custom project.

Hines also collaborated with Joe Bailon to produce the Panthermobile in 1969.

Hines worked without drawing plans, able to, for instance, construct a custom working convertible top from scratch without them. He also fabricated hydraulic systems.

While living in Garden Grove, California, in 2015, Hines suffered a heart attack. He died five months later, at age 94.
