= DeLorean time machine =

Back to the Future time travel vehicle

- Back to the Future vehicle
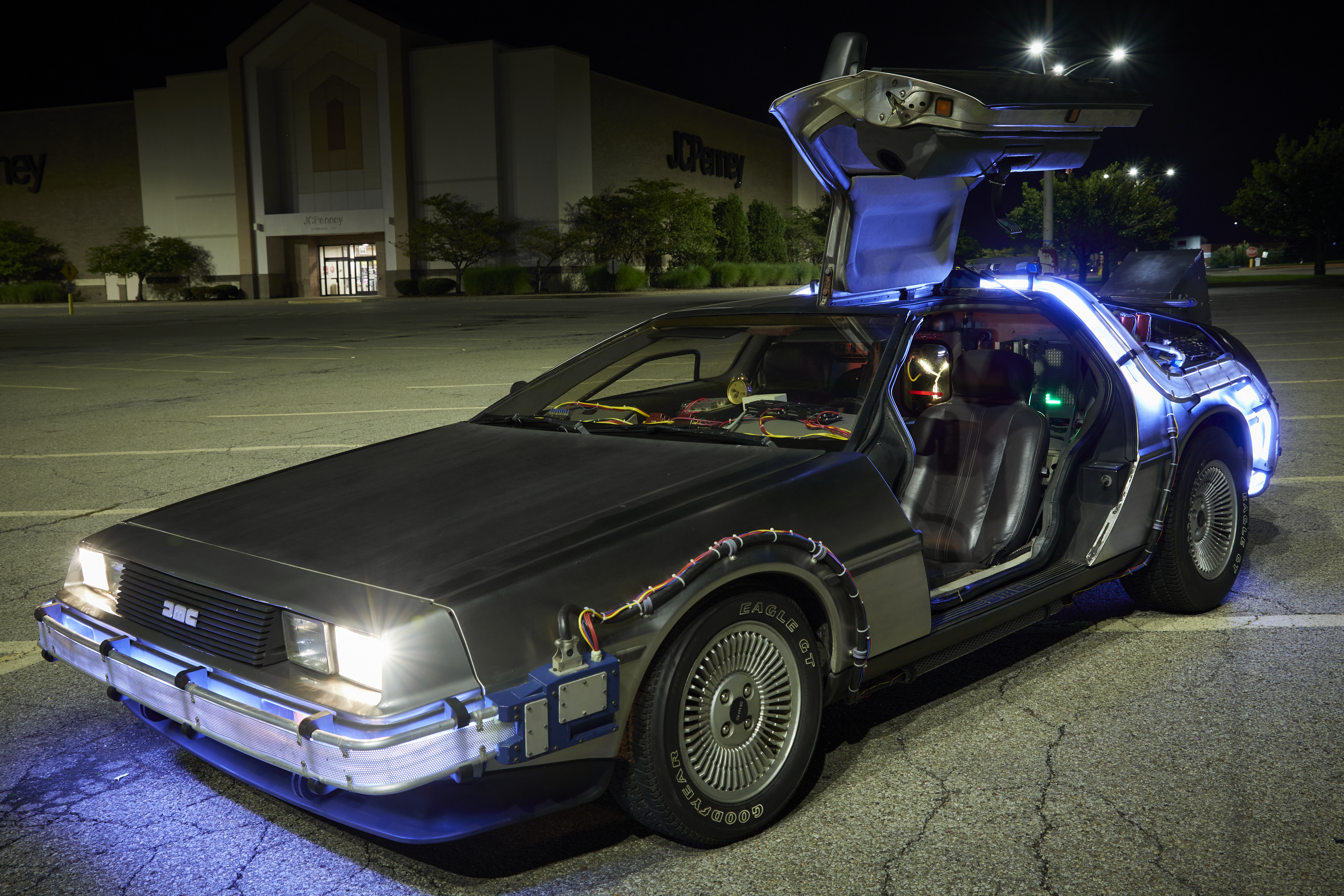
- Side view of a replica of the DeLorean time machine
- First appearance: Back to the Future (1985)
- Created by: Robert Zemeckis; Bob Gale

Information
- Affiliation: Marty McFly; Emmett Brown

General characteristics
- Class: Time travel car

In the Back to the Future franchise, the DeLorean time machine is a time travel vehicle constructed from a retrofitted DMC DeLorean. Its time travel ability is derived from the "flux capacitor", a component that allows the car to travel to the past or future. This occurs when the car accelerates to 88 miles per hour and requires 1.21 gigawatts of electricity.

In 2021, the time machine was added to the Library of Congress's National Historic Vehicle Register.

== Development ==
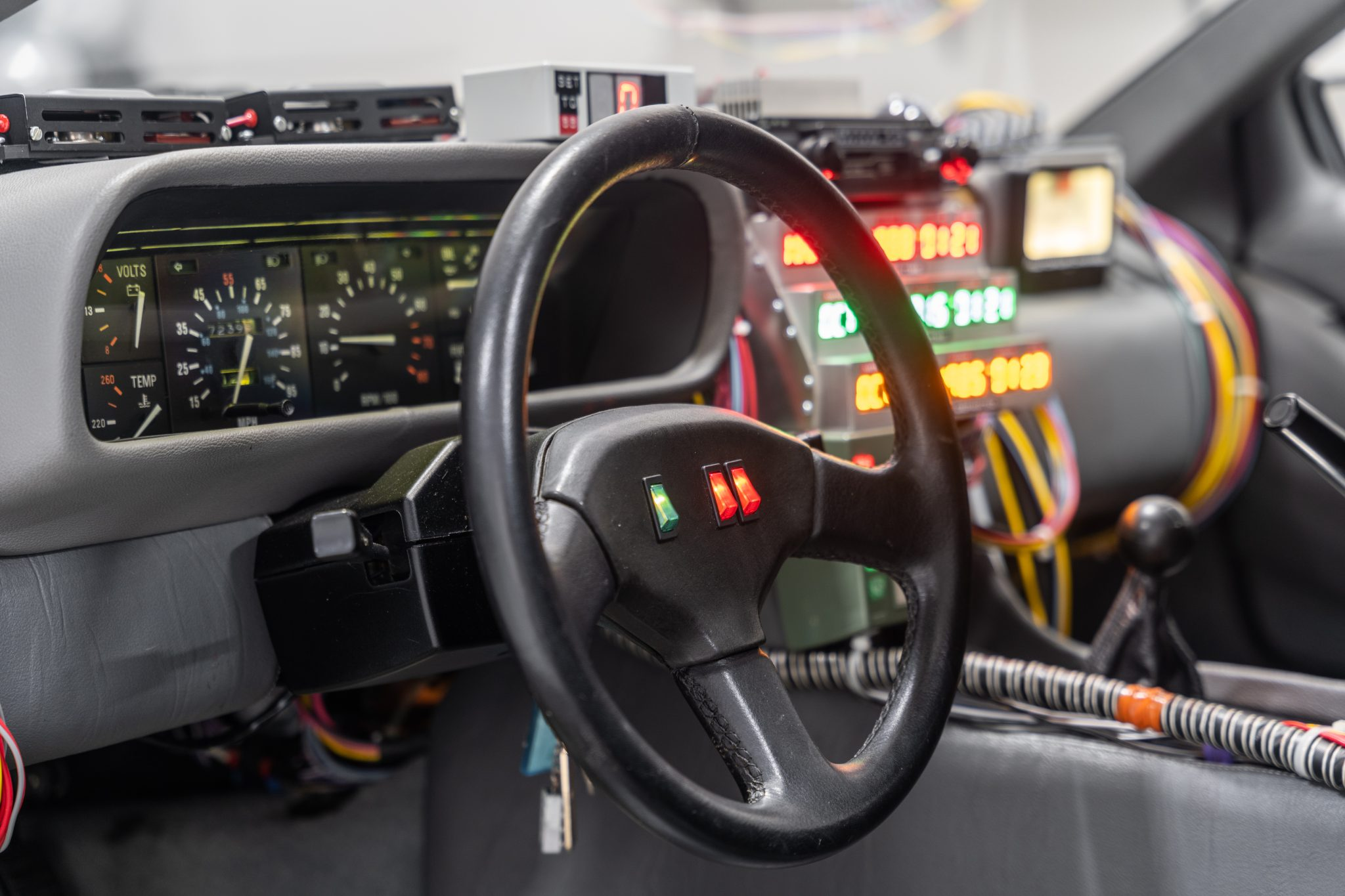
Inside the cabin facing front

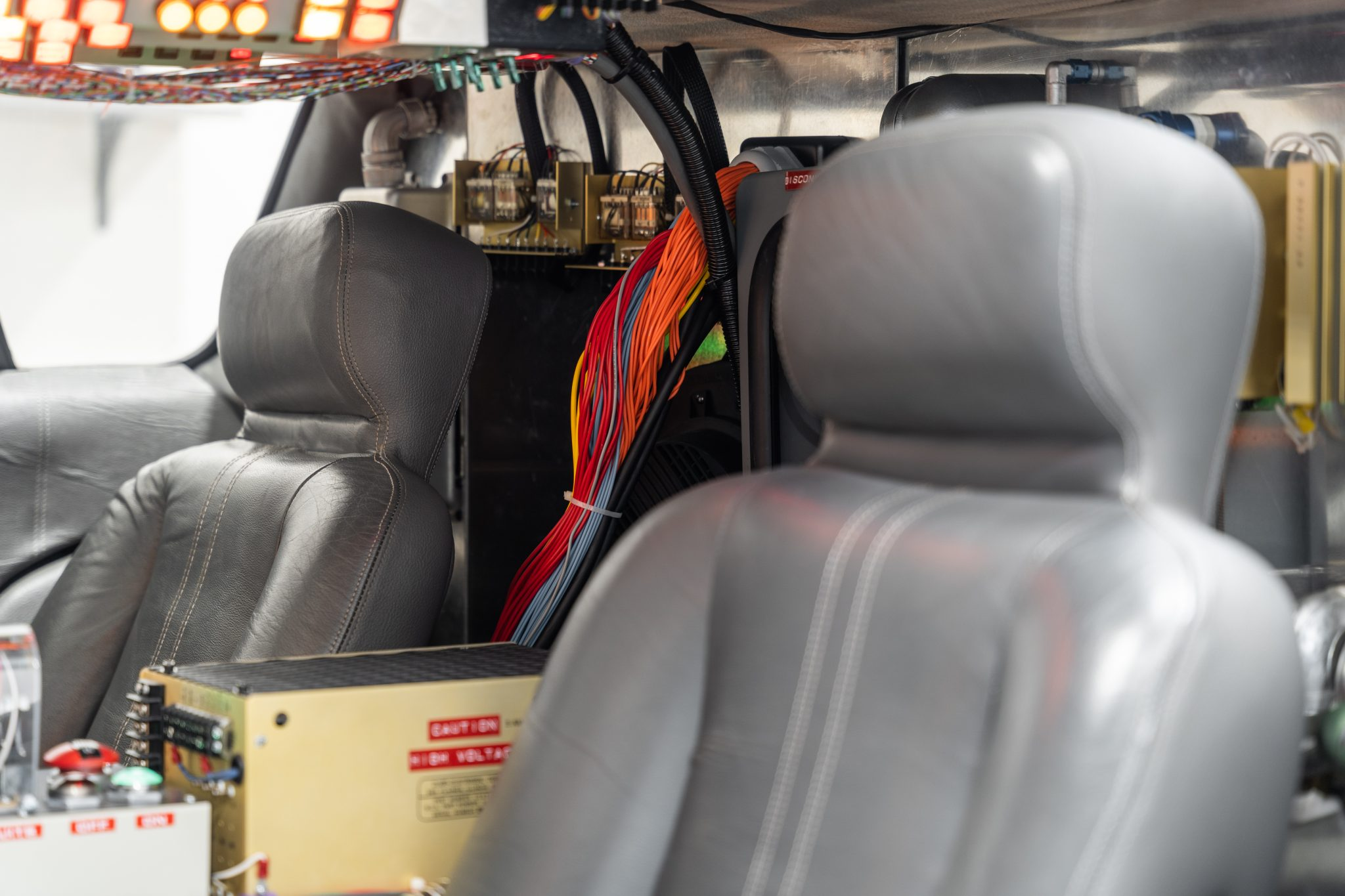
Inside the cabin facing rear

During the development of Back to the Future, the time machine was initially conceived as a laser device. At the end of the first draft of the screenplay it was attached to a refrigerator and taken to a nuclear bomb test in the Nevada desert, where it was driven into the atomic explosion to make use of the atomic energy. The scene involved the film's protagonist, Marty McFly, climbing inside the refrigerator while the truck was in motion. Spielberg vetoed the idea due to being concerned that children might attempt to do the same and get trapped inside. Zemeckis suggested a DMC DeLorean because using a vehicle solved the problem of being a stationary booth and instead offered mobility. Additionally, its unique design would appear like an alien UFO to a 1950s family due to its characteristic gullwing doors. When tackling the issue of the time machine's origins, the creative team decided that an eccentric individual named Doc Brown built it in his garage rather than a corporation, which Bob Gale said gave it a "slapdash, kind of cool look to it". During filming, the production went over budget and behind schedule, thus the power source was changed to lightning and the location moved to the clock tower in Hill Valley.

The DeLorean was developed under the supervision of Lawrence Paull, who designed it with artist Ron Cobb and illustrator Andrew Probert. They intended for the vehicle to look fixed together from common parts. The Ford Motor Company offered $75,000 to use a Ford Mustang instead; Gale responded that "Doc Brown doesn't drive a fucking Mustang". Michael Fink was hired as the art department liaison and tasked with realizing Cobb's sketches and overseeing the car's construction. Paull and Canton, who had worked with him on Blade Runner (1982) and Buckaroo Banzai (1984), respectively, recruited him. Fink had a project lined up but agreed to help in the free weeks he had remaining.

Three DeLoreans used were purchased from a collector—one for stunts, one for special effects, and one for normal shots. They were unreliable and often broke down. 88 mph (142 km/h) was chosen as the time travel speed because it was easy to remember and looked "cool" on the speedometer. A custom speedometer was built to simulate 88 mph, as a 1979 law passed by then-President Jimmy Carter had limited speedometers to 85 mph to reduce speeding. The Flux Capacitor, necessary for time travel, was called the Temporal Field Capacitor; Zemeckis said the name was not believable. From his work on the 1979 drama The China Syndrome, Fink had learned of neutron flux. He and Zemeckis simultaneously suggested renaming it the Flux Capacitor. Cobb and Probert had already placed the Flux Capacitor on the external and interior roof of the DeLorean. Fink placed it next to the driver. Fink constructed the device using a NEMA box and backlit Torr High-Voltage relays. The time display was constructed from LMB boxes. When Fink left, he picked Michael Scheffe to replace him. Scheffe finished the Flux Capacitor build and built the "Mr. Fusion" replacement power supply out of a Krups coffee grinder.

The flying DeLorean used a combination of live-action footage, animation, and a 1:5 scale (approximately 33 inches (840 mm) long) model built by Steve Gawley and the model shop crew and filmed against a blue screen. Months were spent building the model from epoxy, steel, and aluminum. Halogen lamps were fitted to the tires to simulate thrusters; the tires were made from aluminum to withstand the heat. Blue chalk was rubbed on the windscreen to conceal the lack of riders.

The act of the DeLorean traveling through time is referred to as the "time slice" effect. Zemeckis only knew that he wanted it to be a violent transition. He described it like a "Neanderthal sitting on the hood of the DeLorean and chipping away the fabric of time in front of him". He suggested a crack in time opening before the car, but animators could not determine what would be on the reverse of the opening visible to the audience. An electrical effect enveloping the car was abandoned because a similar process had been used in the science fiction film The Terminator (1984). Other ideas included a wave of energy that moved over the car before exploding and blowing open a hole in time, and a "cubist" effect where the car would break into separate segments, each individually expanding in proportion before disappearing. Takahashi developed artwork showing the segments popping out from the DeLorean and glowing. Gale liked the effect, but Zemeckis did not; Spielberg found it unrealistic.

Takahashi animated separate effects like contrails and flashing lights; Zemeckis opted to use them all. The effects were drawn in black and white and optically manipulated afterward. This resulted in the DeLorean appearing to emit various effects that strike in front of the car to create an explosion that opens the time slice. This was combined with practical effects including smoke, sparks, and flash-bulbs. Fire emitting from the tires was intended to start the sequence but the gas jet mechanism repeatedly failed; it only functioned for two of the six shots required. Peggy Regan animated flames and reflections for consistency. The trails of fire left behind the DeLorean were practical, but the actual movement was slow. The footage was sped up and smoke added where the car disappeared. Fox and Lloyd were filmed against a reflective mylar blue screen set to match the parking lot's wet surface and composited into the trails of fire. Reflections of the actors were matte paintings filmed through a ripple glass to add texture. A stuntman in a dog suit portrays Doc's dog when in the moving car. It was suggested that the DeLorean emerge from the time slice in sections that slam into each preceding section. Norwood and Charlie Mullen outlined an animation and Ellen Lichtwardt animated a glow to the vehicle. The effect is so quick as to be imperceptible. Zemeckis preferred this as he did not want the audience to think too much about how everything worked.

Different parts from three 1982 DeLoreans were used in the first film. Liquid nitrogen was poured onto the car for scenes after it had traveled through time to give the impression that it was cold. The base for the nuclear reactor was made from the hubcap from a Dodge Polara. Aircraft parts and blinking lights were added for effect. In one of the first scenes, carbon dioxide fire extinguishers were hidden inside the DeLorean to simulate the exhaust effect. Ultimately, five real DeLoreans were used in the filming of the trilogy, plus one "process" car built for interior shots. In the off-road scenes in the third film, a modified-for-off-road VW Beetle frame was fitted to the DeLorean with the whitewall tires and baby Moon hubcaps. A seventh DeLorean was also used in the filming, but this one was merely a full-sized, fiberglass model used for exterior shots where the vehicle hovers above the set as well as when the actors interact with the vehicle.

While the original PRV V6 engines were retained in the physical cars for filming, the film's sound effects artists used the sound of a Porsche 928 V8 and the Star Wars's landspeeder for the engine sounds in the movie.

== Cars used in filming ==
Universal Studios special effects department built three main DeLorean time machines for the movie Back to the Future. The film's producers characterized the DeLoreans with three names: the A car, B car, and C car.

The "A" car, also known as the Hero car, was the most detailed and utilized vehicle during production. After filming was over, the "A" car was delivered to Universal Studios Hollywood as an attraction piece. As time passed, visitors started taking parts off the vehicle and wandering off with them. Bob Gale selected a team to repair the car so it could be in a perfect condition. The vehicle is currently being displayed at the Petersen Automotive Museum in Los Angeles.

The "B" car, also known as the Stunt Car used in all three movies, was mainly used for stunts. After purposely being struck by a train during production, the car was left as a pile of rubble. Movie car customizer Jay Ohrberg used the "B" car wreckage to construct various DeLorean replicas. The "B" car's body panels were sold to Planet Hollywood Hawaii, where it was hooked up on the ceiling of the restaurant until its shutdown in 2010. The car was sold at auction to Bill and Patrick Shea after Back to the Future HQ reached out to Planet Hollywood to find the car's remains. The stunt car is currently being displayed at Hubbardston, Massachusetts.

The "C" car was used for interior footage and was torn apart so the camera could fit inside the car. The vehicle was left at Universal Studios Hollywood, many of its parts were put together on a replica remodeled by Tom Talmon Studios for Universal Japan. Universal Japan sold the car to a private company and the vehicle is currently being displayed on the company's entryway.

There were three extra DeLoreans used through the production of the sequels. The fiberglass car used on special effects was reportedly destroyed. The stunt train, better known as The Oxnard Car, was displayed in Universal Studios, Florida, from the early 1990s to 2020. The studio decided to replace the original car with a replica to be stored for restoration. The desert car with the blue cross over tube was left at Universal Studios Hollywood; Tom Talmon Studios used parts of this car on a replica displayed on Universal Japan. After Japanese workers stole some of the car props, ScreenUsed acquired the car for restoration and then settled the car for auction. Bill and Patrick Shea ended up buying it, and they placed the car on display at Hubbardston, Massachusetts.

== Operation ==
The control of the time machine is the same in all three films. The operator is seated inside the DeLorean (except the first time, when the remote control is used), and turns on the time circuits by turning a handle near the gear lever, activating a unit containing multiple fourteen- and seven-segment displays that show the destination (red), present (green), and last departed (yellow) dates and times. After entering a target date with the keypad inside the DeLorean, the operator accelerates the car to 88 mph (142 km/h), which activates the flux capacitor. As it accelerates, several coils around the body glow blue/white while a burst of light appears in front of it. Surrounded by an electric current similar to a Tesla coil, the whole car vanishes in a flash of white/blue light seconds later, leaving a pair of fiery tire tracks. A digital speedometer is attached to the dashboard so that the operator can accurately gauge the car's speed.

Various proposals have been brought forth in the past by fans of the movie franchise for why the car has to be moving at 88 mph to achieve temporal displacement, but actually the production crew chose the velocity simply because they liked how it looked on the speedometer, modified for the movie. The actual speedometer on the production DeLorean's dashboard only goes up to 85 mph, and the car itself was criticized for being underpowered.

Observers outside the vehicle see an implosion of plasma as the vehicle disappears, leaving behind a trail of fire aligned with the DeLorean's tires (which can also appear in midair), while occupants within the vehicle see a quick flash of light and instantaneously arrive at the target time in the same spatial location (relative to the Earth) as when it departed. In the destination time, immediately before the car's arrival, three large and loud flashes occur at the point from which the car emerges from its time travel. After the trip, the exterior of the DeLorean is extremely cold, and frost forms from atmospheric moisture all over the car's body. Vents on the back heat the vehicle after time travel.

The DeLorean suffers assorted malfunctions and damage over the course of the trilogy. In the first film, the car has starter problems and has a hard time restarting once stopped, much to Marty's repeated frustration. In the second film, the destination time display malfunctions and begins to show a series of random dates, causing Doc to be sent back to 1885 when the DeLorean is struck by lightning with him inside. In the third film, a note left by Doc's 1885 self reveals that the DeLorean's flying circuits (added by him in 2015) were destroyed by the strike. After Marty travels back to 1885, the fuel line and fuel injection manifold both suffer damage, leaving the car unable to move under its own power.

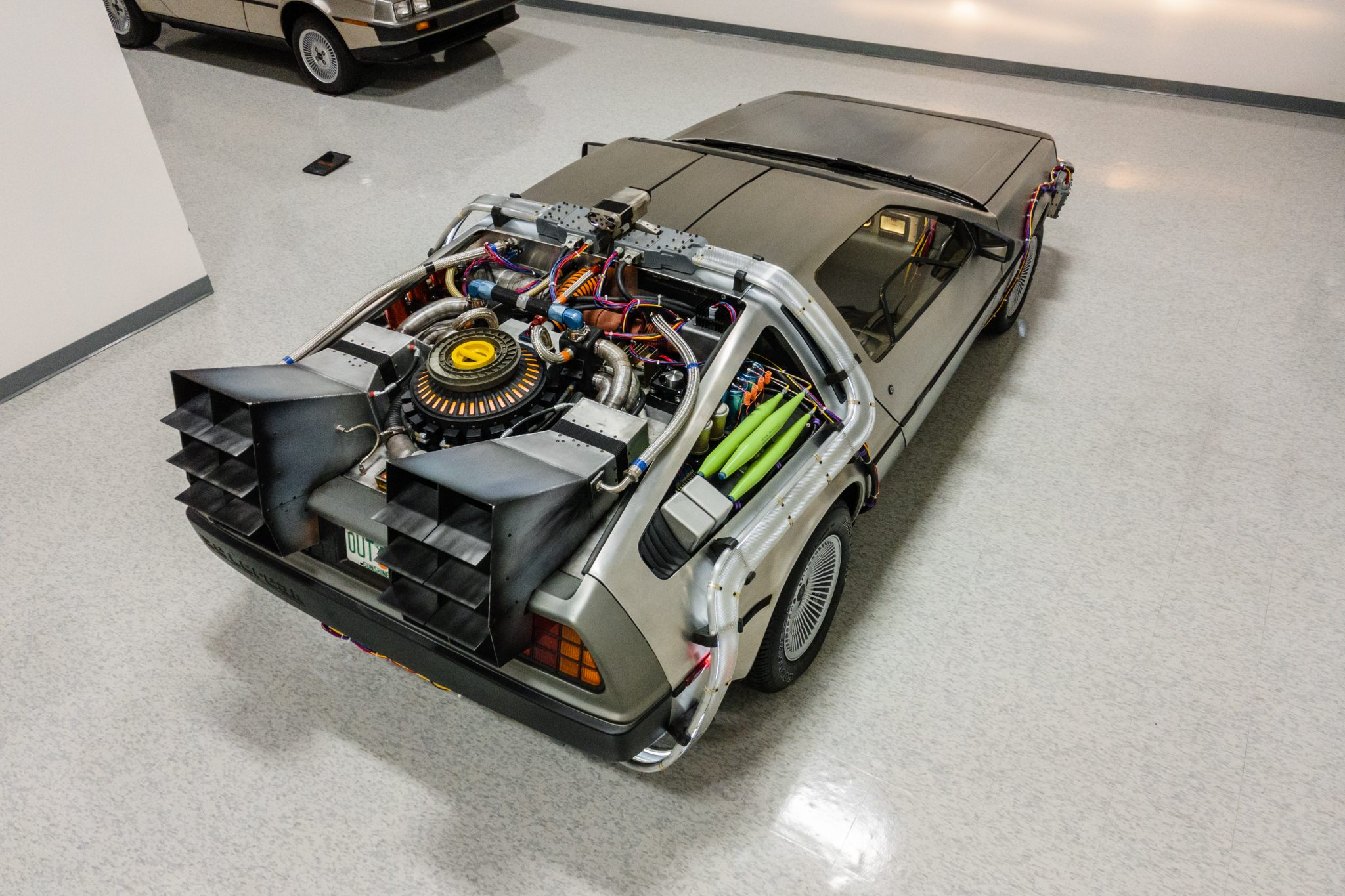
A back view of the DeLorean time machine

The time machine is electric and requires a power input of 1.21 gigawatts (1,620,000 hp) to operate, originally provided by a plutonium-fueled nuclear reactor. In the first film, following Marty's accidental trip from 1985 to 1955, Doc has no access to plutonium in 1955, so he outfits the car with a large pole and hook to channel the power of a lightning bolt into the flux capacitor and send Marty back to 1985. During Doc's first visit to 2015, he has the machine refitted to fly in addition to standard road driving, and he replaces the nuclear reactor with a Mr. Fusion generator that uses garbage as fuel.

Although the Mr. Fusion unit provides the required power for the time machine, the DeLorean is still powered by an internal combustion engine for propulsion. The fuel line is damaged during Marty's trip to 1885 in Back to the Future Part III. After he and Doc patch it, they attempt to use whiskey as a replacement fuel since commercial gasoline is not yet available. The test fails, damaging the car's fuel injection manifold and leaving it unable to travel under its own power.

Doc and Marty consider options to reach the required 88 mph (such as pulling it with horses, which fails because the car barely breaks 30 mph) and ultimately settle on pushing the car with a steam locomotive. They replace the DeLorean's standard wheels with a set designed to mate with train rails. For the extra power needed to push it up to speed, Doc adds his own version of "Presto Logs" (a chemically treated mixture of pressed wood and anthracite) to the locomotive's boiler and chooses a location with a straight section of track long enough to achieve 88 mph.

=== "Jigowatts" ===
The power required is pronounced in the film as "one point twenty-one jigowatts", with a "jigowatt" referring to "one billion watts". The spelling of "jigowatts" is used in the script and was also the spelling used in the closed-captioning in earlier home video versions of the film. However, the correct spelling is "gigawatts". Although rarely used in English, the "j" sound at the beginning of the SI prefix "giga-" is an acceptable pronunciation. Later versions of closed captioning, such as in the 2020 DVD Trilogy release have corrected the spelling to "gigawatts". In the DVD commentary for Back to the Future, Bob Gale states that he had thought it was pronounced this way because it was how a scientific adviser for the film pronounced it. The "jigowatts" spelling is used by Alan Dean Foster in the novelizations of the second and third films.

== Equipment ==
=== Flux capacitor ===
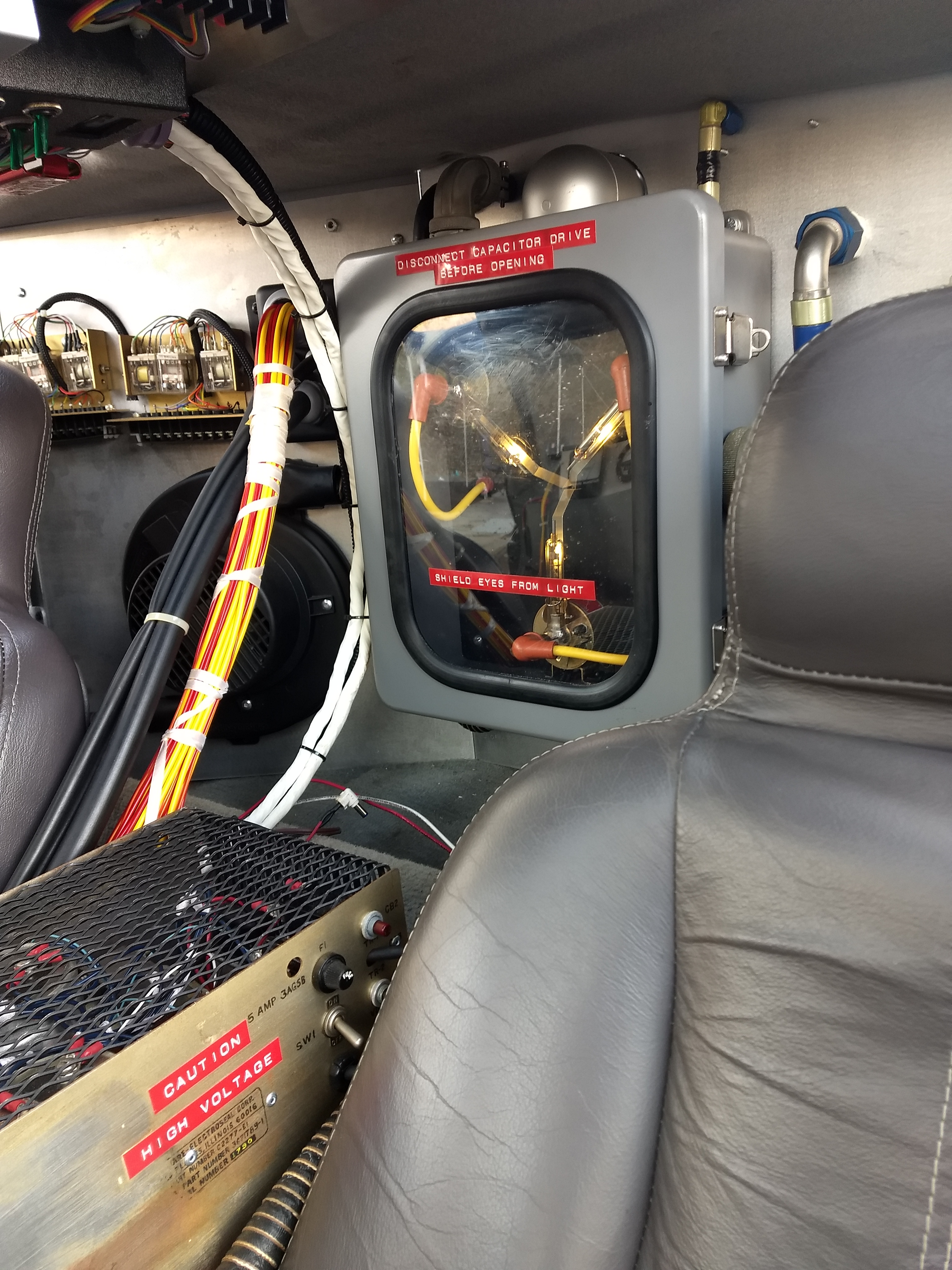
The Flux Capacitor as seen in a replica DeLorean Time Machine

The flux capacitor, which consists of a rectangular-shaped compartment with three flashing Geissler-style tubes arranged in a "Y" configuration, is described by Doc as "what makes time travel possible". The device is the core component of the time machine.

As the time machine nears 88 mph, light coming from the flux capacitor begins pulsing more rapidly until it becomes a steady stream. Doctor Emmet Brown originally conceived the idea for the flux capacitor on November 5, 1955, when he slipped on the edge of his toilet while hanging a clock in his bathroom and hit his head on the sink. In 1955, Doc had named the flux capacitor the "Flux Compresser" as shown on 1955 Doc's diagram. A similar flux capacitor is also seen in the chimney headlamp of Doc's second time machine, the Time Machine Locomotive, at the end of Back to the Future Part III.

Although the films do not describe exactly how the flux capacitor works, Doc mentions at one point that the stainless steel body of the DeLorean has a direct and influential effect on the "flux dispersal", but he is interrupted before he can finish the explanation. The explanation is finished in BTTF's "Delorean Time Machine; Doc Brown's Owners' Workshop Manual", which says "However, the stainless-steel construction of the DeLorean would serve to make the Flux Dispersal uniform across the entire surface area of the vehicle."

The instruction manual for the AMT/ERTL DeLorean model kit also states: "Because the car's stainless steel body improves the flux dispersal generated by the flux capacitor, and this in turn allows the vehicle smooth passage through the space-time continuum".

=== Time circuits ===
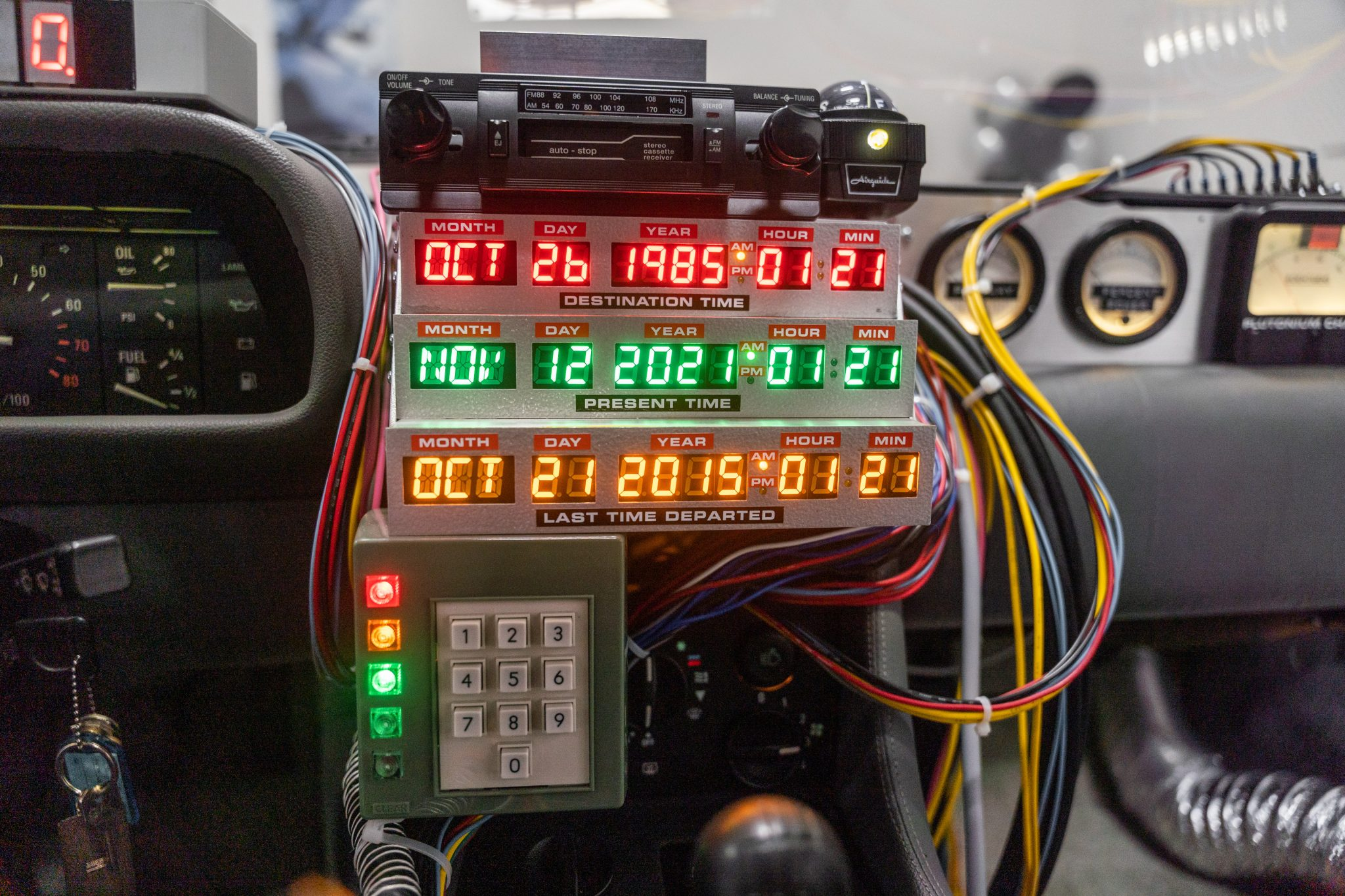
Time circuits from the DeLorean used in the first and second films

The time circuits are an integral part of the DeLorean time machine. They were built with an input device and a display. The display was divided into three sections: destination time (shown in red), present time (shown in green), and last time departed (shown in yellow), all annotated with Dymo Corporation labels. Each display includes a month, a day, a year, and the hour and minutes in that point in time. The years on the time circuits were limited to four digits and there were no possible negative years that could be reached, i.e. years before "0 A.D." (1 B.C.). This means the DeLorean could travel to any time from 12:00 am on January 1, 1 B.C. to 11:59 pm on December 31, A.D. 9999.

The destination time display shows the date that the operator wants the DeLorean to go to (when the operator types in a date using the keypad in the DeLorean, it will be shown in the destination time display), the present time display shows the DeLorean's current location in time, and the last time departed display shows what point in time the DeLorean originally was after making a journey through time. Doc demonstrated its capabilities to Marty after its first test, giving two well-known but erroneous dates as examples: the signing of the Declaration of Independence, July 4, 1776; and the birth of Christ, December 25, 0000. He also displayed the day that he first conceived of the flux capacitor, by which he marks the day he invented time travel, November 5, 1955, as he explains to Marty in the beginning of the first film.

During the second film, because of Biff Tannen's tampering following his theft of the DeLorean, the time circuits began malfunctioning, displaying January 1, 1885, in the destination time display. A bolt of lightning triggers the malfunction to send the DeLorean from 1955 to 1885. Though the vehicle was in mid-air, the spin created by the lightning bolt allowed it to reach 88 mph. Doc is trapped in 1885 and repairs were impossible because the time circuit control microchip, which governed the time circuits, was destroyed by the lightning bolt, and suitable replacement parts would not be invented until at least 1947. Doc places repair instructions and a schematic diagram in the time machine to enable his 1955 counterpart to repair it using components from that era – which included vacuum tubes — before boarding it up within a silver mine. He then writes Marty a letter explaining the situation and places it in the custody of Western Union, with instructions to deliver it to Marty in 1955.

=== Mr. Fusion ===
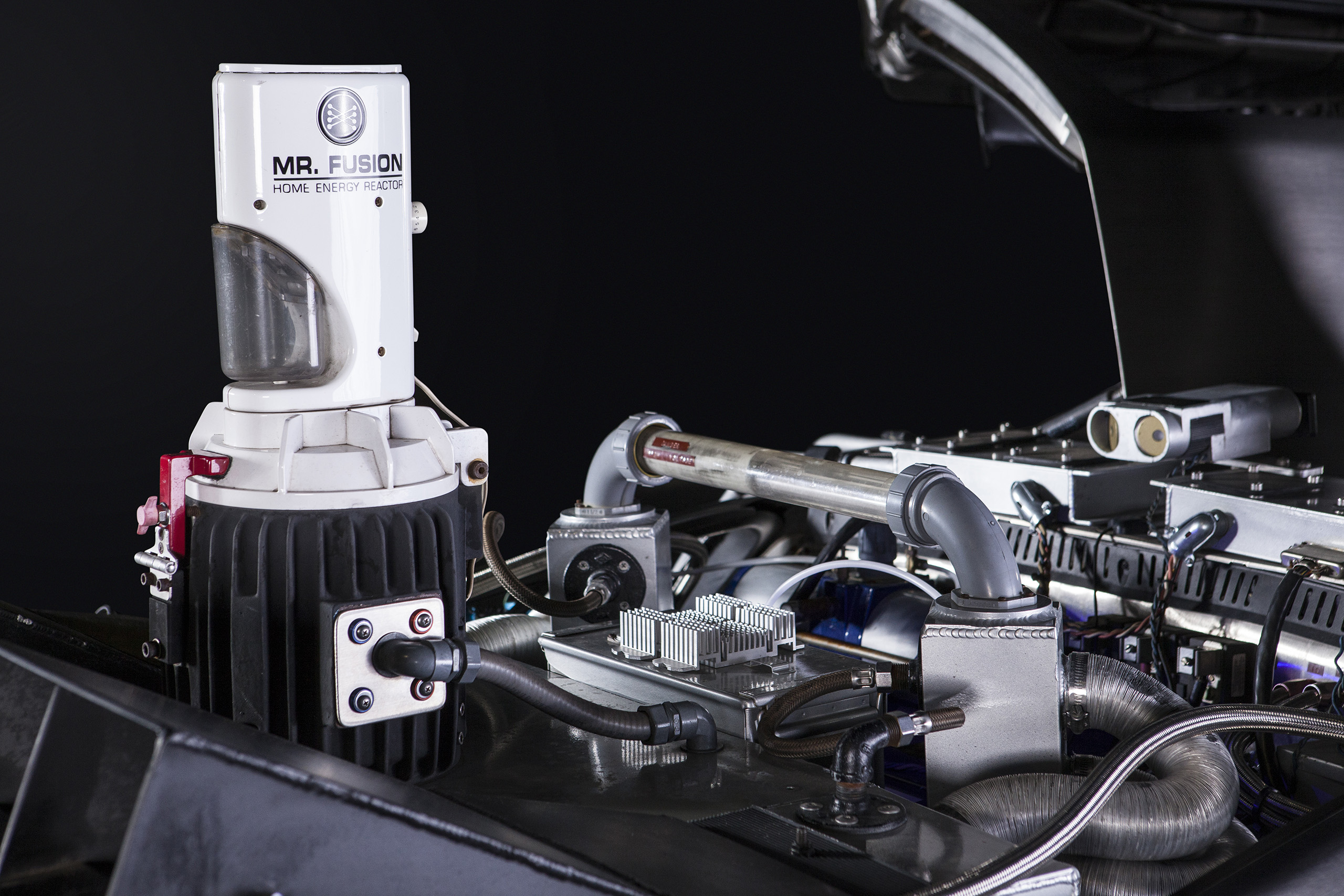
A replica of the DeLorean time machine's Mr. Fusion Home Energy Reactor

The Mr. Fusion Home Energy Reactor is the name of a power source used by the DeLorean time machine in the Back to the Future trilogy. It can be seen for the first time at the end of Back to the Future when Doc pulls into the McFly's driveway after a trip to the year 2015. It was a piece of technology he was only able to obtain due to his journey to 2015, which in the movie existed by then. It is a parody of Mr. Coffee machines, which were very popular at the time of filming. The appliance from which the prop was made was actually a Krups "Coffina" model coffee grinder.

The Mr. Fusion Home Energy Reactor converts household waste to power for the time machine's flux capacitor and time circuits using nuclear fusion, presumably cold fusion. In the film, Mr. Fusion allows the DeLorean time machine to generate the required 1.21 gigawatts needed to travel to any point in time. The energy produced by Mr. Fusion replaces plutonium as the primary power source of the DeLorean's time travel, allowing the characters to bypass the arduous power-generation requirements upon which the plot of the first film hinges. The plutonium fission reactor was most likely left installed underneath Mr. Fusion as a backup power source.

The Mr. Fusion can provide enough power to the flux capacitor and the time circuits, but is not used to power up the DeLorean itself, which makes use of an ordinary gasoline combustion engine to reach the 88 mph speed necessary for it to time travel. This limitation proved crucial in the third movie when Doc and Marty find themselves stuck in 1885 and unable to drive the DeLorean due to a punctured fuel line. The vehicle's hover system is powered by Mr. Fusion and is capable of bringing the DeLorean up to the required 88 mph. However, the flight systems are destroyed as a result of the lightning strike that occurs at the end of the second film, leaving Marty to rely on the original combustion engine, which is also disabled.

=== Other equipment ===
The DeLorean has other features that aid in its ability to time travel:

- A keypad that is used to type in a target date in the destination time display.
- Vents on the back that heat the DeLorean after traveling through time.
- A lever that turns on the time circuits.
- A wormhole emitter on the roof that creates wormholes for the car to travel through time.
- An alarm clock that 1955 Doc put in the DeLorean's dashboard, which is signaled to ring to tell Marty when to speed towards the clock tower at 88 mph in the first film.
- A pole with a hook attached to the top of the car that is used to channel a lightning strike into the flux capacitor to allow the car to return to 1985 with Marty, though the pole itself remains behind in 1955.
- A boiler gauge in the dashboard that is connected to the boiler of a stolen locomotive that pushes the DeLorean.

== Fictional timeline ==
For most of the first film, the 1.21 gigawatts are supplied by a plutonium-powered nuclear fission reactor and, with the absence of plutonium, a bolt of lightning channeled directly into the flux capacitor by a long pole and hook in the film's climactic sequence. At the end of the first film, and for the remainder of the trilogy, the plutonium nuclear reactor is replaced by a "Mr. Fusion Home Energy Reactor" generator possibly acquired in 2015. The "Mr. Fusion" device apparently converts household waste into electrical power; the name suggests nuclear fusion. Due to a "hover conversion" made in 2015, the car also becomes capable of hovering and flight, though it lost this ability at the end of the second film.

=== History ===
After acquiring the DeLorean and modifying it into a time machine, Doc brings it to the Twin Pines Mall and tests it out by using a remote control to send it one minute into the future with his dog Einstein in it. He also shows Marty the major functions of the DeLorean: the flux capacitor, the time circuits, and the plutonium chamber that powers them. After refueling the DeLorean with plutonium stolen from Libyan terrorists (who previously stole the plutonium from a power plant), Doc prepares to travel into the future, but the Libyans unexpectedly arrive and shoot Doc. Marty uses the DeLorean to flee from the Libyans and is transported to 1955 after accidentally activating the time circuits, but without the needed plutonium to return to 1985. Once there, the DeLorean exhibits problems with the starter, and with its plutonium chamber empty, Marty hides the DeLorean behind a road sign and contacts the Doc Brown living in 1955. The two bring it to Brown's workshop.

Unable to obtain plutonium, Doc and Marty realize that the only source for the power needed to return the DeLorean to 1985 is a bolt of lightning. Fortunately, a fundraising flyer given to Marty in 1985 shows that lightning will strike Hill Valley Courthouse's clock tower at 10:04 pm on the coming Saturday, November 12. Doc installs a cable leading from the top of the clock down to the street to harness the lightning, and attaches a long pole and hook to the DeLorean to channel the energy into the flux capacitor once the hook makes contact with the cable while the DeLorean is accelerating at 88 mph. Despite setbacks, such as the cable being disconnected by a fallen branch and the DeLorean having starter problems again, the plan succeeds and Marty returns home. He decides to set the destination time to eleven minutes before he left so he can warn Doc of his upcoming death, since the 1955 Doc wouldn't listen out of fear of changing history. With the DeLorean once again having issues with the starter, Marty is forced to run to the Twin Pines Mall, now called the Lone Pine Mall due to his actions in 1955. He is too late, and sees Doc gunned down while his other self escapes to 1955, leaving the Libyans to crash into a photo booth. It is then revealed that Doc wore a bulletproof vest and had listened to Marty's warning after all.

After returning Marty home, Doc travels with Einstein to October 21, 2015. He upgrades the DeLorean with 2015 technology, replacing the plutonium chamber with a Mr. Fusion Reactor, and giving it the ability to fly. In the second film, he returns to 1985 to pick up Marty and Jennifer, telling them that they have to rectify a problem caused in the future when Marty's son commits a crime. While there, the DeLorean is stolen by Biff Tannen, who discovers that it is a time machine. He uses it to travel back to November 12, 1955, the same day as the climax of the first film, to give his past self a sports almanac which the young Biff uses to accumulate wealth from gambling. Biff returns the DeLorean to 2015 without Marty or Doc discovering his use of it. When they return to 1985, they find that Biff's manipulation of history has created a post-apocalyptic alternate timeline in which Biff is a wealthy casino boss and crime lord. Once they discover that this was caused by older Biff's use of the DeLorean and the almanac, Marty and Doc return to 1955 to prevent these events and restore the original timeline. They manage to take back and destroy the almanac, but the DeLorean is struck by lightning again and disappears due to a malfunction in the time circuits, taking Doc to January 1, 1885. Both the DeLorean's time circuits and flying capability are disabled in the process, though not the internal combustion engine.

Because suitable replacement parts to repair the DeLorean will not be invented until 1947, Doc hides the DeLorean in a mine, and leaves a letter to be delivered to Marty by Western Union in 1955, in which he explains what happened to him. Doc states he is happy in his new life there as a blacksmith, and requests that Marty not attempt to retrieve him, but instead to return to 1985 and destroy the DeLorean, believing that it has brought them and the world nothing but disaster. However, Marty and 1955 Doc learn that just nine months after arriving in 1885, Doc will be murdered by Biff's great grandfather, Buford "Mad Dog" Tannen, on September 7, 1885. For this reason, the 1955 Doc and Marty agree to have Marty travel back in time to 1885 to prevent Doc's murder. After retrieving the DeLorean from the mine, repairing its time-travel ability, and replacing its since-disintegrated tires with whitewalls (although they could not restore its flight systems), Marty travels to 1885, but the DeLorean's fuel line is damaged soon after he arrives there. After encountering his ancestors, Marty decides to use the alias Clint Eastwood. After meeting up with the 1885 Doc, the fuel line is repaired, but their experiments with creating modern fuel from whiskey destroys the fuel injection manifold, leaving the car unable to travel under its own power. After trying a few ideas (such as pulling it with horses), they resolve to use a steam locomotive to push the DeLorean up to 88 mph. They learn that for the locomotive to reach 88 mph, the run would have to be on a flat, straight track with no cars coupled behind it and with the boiler's temperature risen to dangerous levels. Doc replaces the 1955-style wheels with cast iron train wheels that fit on the track rails.

Doc and Marty plan to make their run on a flat, straight section of track leading to an unfinished bridge over Shonash Ravine. While making their plans, Doc saves schoolteacher Clara Clayton from falling into Shonash Ravine. They realize in the original timeline, Clara fell to her death in the ravine, which was renamed Clayton Ravine. After her rescue, Doc and Clara begin to fall in love. Marty and Doc continue their plan, in which the Mr. Fusion unit will provide the power required to activate the flux capacitor and make the jump through time once the stolen locomotive and the DeLorean reach 88 mph. Doc also added "Presto Logs" into the locomotive's boiler to make the fire burn hotter, and used the whitewalls from earlier and a wooden support to cushion the DeLorean and locomotive. Their plan is successful, and upon reaching the end of the track, the DeLorean disappears to 1985 with Marty, though Doc decides to stay behind with Clara, since "Mad Dog" Tannen is arrested for a stagecoach robbery, and Doc's murder is prevented. The locomotive falls down the cliff and is destroyed in an explosion.

Back in 1985, the DeLorean arrives on the now-completed bridge and crosses over the ravine, now called Eastwood Ravine on account of Marty's exploits in 1885. The DeLorean becomes stuck on the tracks, and Marty barely manages to escape before the DeLorean is completely destroyed by a freight train. Later, Doc, Clara, and their children: Jules and Verne, appear in the same location where the DeLorean was destroyed, piloting a new time machine in the form of a steam-powered train: the Time Machine Locomotive. Doc explains that he came back to pick up Einstein before he and his family leave to an unknown location.

Due to the events of all three films, there were multiple versions of the DeLorean existing at the same time. 1985 had two DeLoreans, with the first used by Marty to escape from the Libyans and accidentally travel to 1955, and the second appearing with Marty eleven minutes before the first DeLorean's departure. Four DeLoreans existed at the same time in 1955: the first appearing with Marty following his unintentional trip to 1955 and later used to return to 1985, the second used by 2015 Biff to give his younger self a sports almanac so he can make a fortune, the third used by Marty and Doc to undo Biff's changes to the timeline, and the fourth found in the mines following Doc's unexpected disappearance to 1885. In 1885, there were also two DeLoreans in existence, with the first hidden in the mine after Doc ended up in 1885, and the second used by Marty to prevent Doc's death and then return to 1985.

== Other elements ==
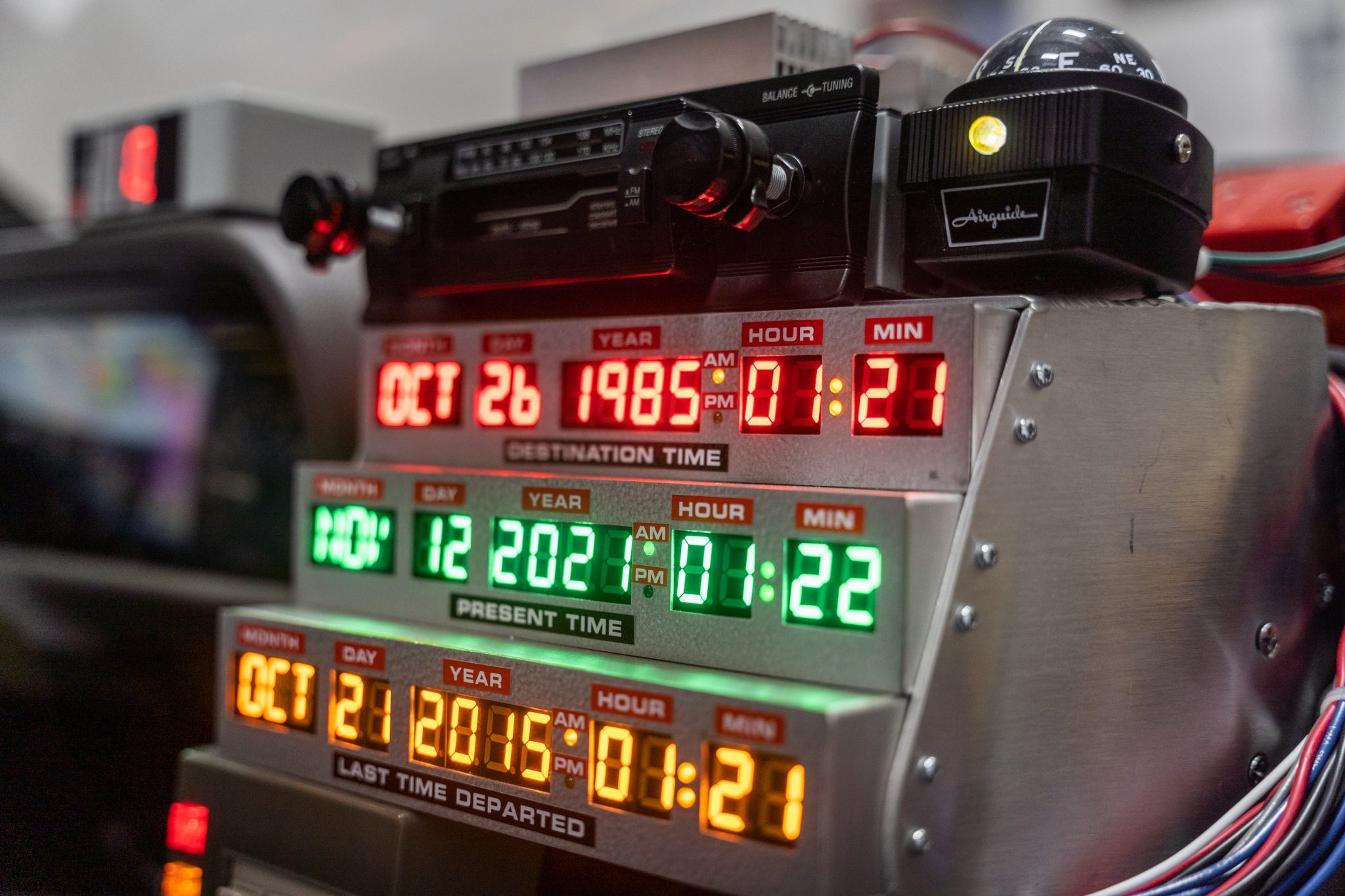
The time circuits in a replica time machine

In the films, the DeLorean time machine is a licensed, registered vehicle in the state of California, where the films take place. The vanity license plate used in the film reads "OUTATIME", a deliberate anomaly, as the maximum number of symbols on California plates is seven characters. When Doc returns from 2015, it is a barcode license plate.

=== Animated series ===
In The Animated Series, Doc builds another DeLorean into a time machine, restoring most of its features, including Mr. Fusion and the hover conversion (Doc either rebuilds the one destroyed at the end of Part III or he simply builds a new one). He also seemingly adds the capability to travel through space in addition to time (i.e., appear at a different location from the one it departed), similar to the TARDIS from Doctor Who. The cartoon DeLorean time machine has many add-ons, including a back seat in normal two-door mode, the ability to transform into a four-door, a pop-out covered wagon top, a blimp, a rear video screen, and a voice activated time input.

=== Back to the Future: The Game ===
Back to the Future: The Game features a chronal duplicate of the original DeLorean, which Doc Brown recovered from the timestream after the destruction of the original. This DeLorean is created at the end of Back to the Future Part II; when the original time machine was struck by lightning: while the DeLorean itself is sent to 1885, a fully functional duplicate appears (apparently unmanned and undamaged) in 2025, where Doc retrieves it with the Time Train before Griff Tannen could. This Clone DeLorean is effectively the same as the Part II one, including the occasional glitches in the time circuits (mostly affecting the last time departed time display), but with a new automatic retrieval feature that automatically brings the Clone DeLorean to a set time and location of Doc's choosing every time Doc doesn't return to the car in a fixed amount of time. The original DeLorean made a brief appearance in Marty Mcfly's nightmare where Doc sends it one minute into the future, which copies the events of the first film. The only difference is that it does not return from its one-minute trip.

The Clone DeLorean appears outside of Doc's house after Marty recovers Doc's notebook from Biff Tannen. Inside is Einstein, a tape recorder with a message from Doc that tells Marty about the automatic retrieval system, and a mysterious shoe. After learning that Doc is stuck somewhere in time, he activates the time circuits, but the last time departed time display is faulty, forcing Marty to use Einstein and the shoe to find out Doc's whereabouts. He eventually learns that Doc is in 1931 and will be killed by Irving "Kid" Tannen, Biff's father. Marty travels to 1931, one day before Doc's death, appearing in the middle of a police chase (the glitch in the time circuits is resolved after the police car bumps into the Clone DeLorean). After getting away from the police, he hides the Clone DeLorean behind a sign.

After rescuing Doc, they prepare to return to 1986, but Marty discovers that he is disappearing; it turns out his grandfather Artie Mcfly will be killed by Kid as a result of Marty's earlier actions. Upon being caught by Officer Danny Parker, Marty swipes the DeLorean keys and travels several hours back (with Doc staying behind) to rescue Artie from Kid to ensure his existence before he and Doc return to 1986, but find themselves in a dystopian future which was brought into existence due to Kid not being arrested. Marty and Doc return to 1931 to correct the timeline (Doc hides the DeLorean in the DeSoto Lot to ensure that no one can find it and later uses it to get Einstein down from the Courthouse), but their actions resulted in the creation of a second dystopian future, with Doc disappearing from existence.

After returning to 1986, Marty crashes the Clone DeLorean into a billboard and after he gets out (breaking the window in the process), the Clone DeLorean falls through the billboard and crashes onto the ground, becoming badly damaged. Marty uses one of its wheels and a battery to get over a nearby wall. The Clone DeLorean is later restored by an alternate version of Doc Brown (who took six months to repair it) who has never developed time travel technology, having access to limited notes about the flux capacitor. After traveling six months back in time, he picks up Marty and they return to 1931. As such, the time circuits of the alternate Clone DeLorean become even more glitchy (resulting in them arriving two months late), accumulating errors as severe as the interval of time traveled, with increasing damage with every time travel attempt: as such, Citizen Brown, the alternate version of Doc, has to install a diagnostic console made of materials available in 1931 (appearing as a plywood box with a diagnostic lightbulb and three similar bulbs placed on the coils on the outer body).

Apparently, part of the problem is chromium parts becoming unstable during time travel, according to Citizen Brown. After a falling out between the duo, Citizen Brown leaves in the alternate Clone DeLorean and picks up Edna Strickland, one of the game's main villains, having decided to have her help change his younger self's career after learning of Edna's unhappy future. Marty foils their attempts, leading Edna to steal the alternate Clone DeLorean with Officer Parker in pursuit. The original Doc arrives in the original Clone DeLorean as Citizen Brown disappears from existence due to earlier events in the game; i.e., because Marty restored the original timeline (the events of all three films), the original Doc and Clone DeLorean are brought back into existence. Officer Parker nearly arrests Marty and Doc for allegedly having the car that Edna got away in. After they explain to him that there is more than one DeLorean, Marty explains to Doc that the alternate Clone DeLorean had malfunctioning time circuits. To make matters worse, the entire town of Hill Valley disappears around them; Edna had unwillingly time traveled to 1876. They go to "Mary Pickford's" house and see that the alternate Clone DeLorean had been destroyed. After they get information from Mary, who was really Edna, they go to 1876. After they stop the fire that would've burned down Hill Valley, they chase down Edna, who is trying to get away in the alternate Clone DeLorean. Marty hoverboards to Edna's DeLorean and synchronizes the two DeLoreans by attaching signal dishes called flux synchronizers over the diagnostic lightbulbs on Edna's DeLorean and pointing them at the receiving dish on Doc's DeLorean (which was apparently attached to its front hood recently), which is flying behind the one that Edna is driving. While doing this, Edna unsuccessfully tries to shake Marty off as he moves around her DeLorean. Their actions result in Edna's DeLorean suffering minor damages: the rear mirror being damaged, one of its windshield wipers being torn off, and the Mr. Fusion Reactor being knocked open (although Marty manages to close it). Once Marty finishes this task, he returns to Doc's DeLorean as they begin their return to 1931, activating the flux capacitor on Edna's DeLorean and making it speed up to 88 mph with its time circuits set to 1931. After they all return to 1931, Edna crashes in front of the police station and is then arrested by Officer Parker for her crimes. Edna's DeLorean then vanishes because of the time ripples catching up with them, causing "chronal decay" (i.e., since Citizen Brown's timeline ceased to exist, the alternate Clone DeLorean was erased from existence). Marty and Doc return to 1986, where three DeLoreans (one normal, one blue, and one black) suddenly arrive with different versions of Marty. The duo leave the Martys arguing before departing to an unknown time in their own DeLorean.

It is implied that the Time Train stays with Clara, Jules, and Verne, passingly mentioned as enjoying the same nomadic life around the time-stream of Doc, but it is never seen in the game.

=== Back to the Future: The Ride ===
In Back to the Future: The Ride, Doc, who now lives in a lab called the Institute of Future Technology, had created an 8-passenger DeLorean that can fly just like the original DeLorean (which can be seen in the ride and in the outside display) and the Time Train (which can only be seen in display outside of the attraction). Unlike the original DeLorean, the flux capacitor is in the front of the cockpit along with a small screen, the time circuits, the keypad, and the speedometer. It is also equipped with a sub-ether time-tracking scanner that allows Doc to pinpoint the location of the original DeLorean in time. The original DeLorean is shown to have its original "OUTATIME" license plate instead of the bar code license plate, but it could just mean that this DeLorean is actually a new one being built into a time machine. Doc can be seen traveling in the original DeLorean in the ride's queue videos. In the attraction, Biff Tannen (who stowed away in one of the institute's time machines that had recently visited 1955) steals the original DeLorean, prompting Doc to send the riders to the 8-passenger DeLorean and use it to go after Biff. The ride begins with the 8-passenger DeLorean traveling to 2015 Hill Valley where it chases Biff across the town. Biff and the riders then travel to the ice age where the 8-passenger DeLorean experiences a temporally engine failure after Biff causes an avalanche that damages it. The 8-passenger DeLorean catches up to Biff in the Cretaceous Period. Biff's DeLorean gets damaged by a T-Rex and lands in a volcano while the T-Rex swallows the 8-passenger DeLorean, but spits it back out. The 8-passenger DeLorean lands in the lava and follows Biff as he goes over a cliff. The riders then bump into him, sending both DeLoreans back to 1991.

=== Doc Brown Saves the World ===
The short film Doc Brown Saves the World features a repaired DeLorean time machine that includes new replacement parts from 2015. It is seen in a video promoting the film, though it is not specified whether it houses a flux capacitor.

== In popular culture ==
The Spanish public broadcaster RTVE has an educational TV program focusing on history named El condensador de fluzo ("The Flux Capacitor") after the film prop. Fluzo is a mistranslation of "flux" that appeared in the Spanish dubbing of the first film and stuck. The correct translation is flujo.

In the 2004 film The Polar Express (also directed by Robert Zemeckis), a flux capacitor is briefly visible in the cab of the locomotive.

In the 2011 novel, Ready Player One, and its 2018 film adaptation, the main character, Wade Watts, drives a digital version of the DeLorean time machine, though it does not travel through time.

The DeLorean made a cameo appearance in the 2014 film A Million Ways to Die in the West.

In the 2018 film Welcome to Marwen (also directed by Robert Zemeckis), the main character, Mark Hogancamp, as part of his elaborate fantasy world that helps him to cope with amnesia and post-traumatic stress disorder, in which he is a World War II doll-like figure pilot named "Cap'n Hogie", builds a makeshift model of the flying DeLorean time machine (though not addressed as such in the film) with Lego bricks, screws, nails, a lava lamp, christmas lights, and a kitchen timer, to appease Dejah Thoris, the fictitious witch in Mark's fantasy world. Later, in one of Mark's fantasies, Cap'n Hogie is saved by Deja Thoris with the DeLorean, before it travels to the future, leaving behind the famous trail of fire, from the DeLorean's tires, midair.

O'Reilly Auto Parts lists a "flux capacitor" in its parts catalog. The part number is "121g" (short for "1.21 gigawatts"), line "EB" (short for "Emmett Brown"). The part is described as for a 1981–83 DeLorean; plutonium must be provided separately. The item is not actually available for purchase.

At Universal Epic Universe, the flux capacitor can be seen on the back of the rollercoaster carts on Stardust Racers.

Christian singer Matthew West's 2021 single "What if?" includes the line, "I can't go back in time; I don't have a DeLorean."

The 2021 video game Forza Horizon 5 includes a purchasable DLC pack called the Universal Icons Car Pack, which features three replicas of the DeLorean (one for each film).

== Toys ==
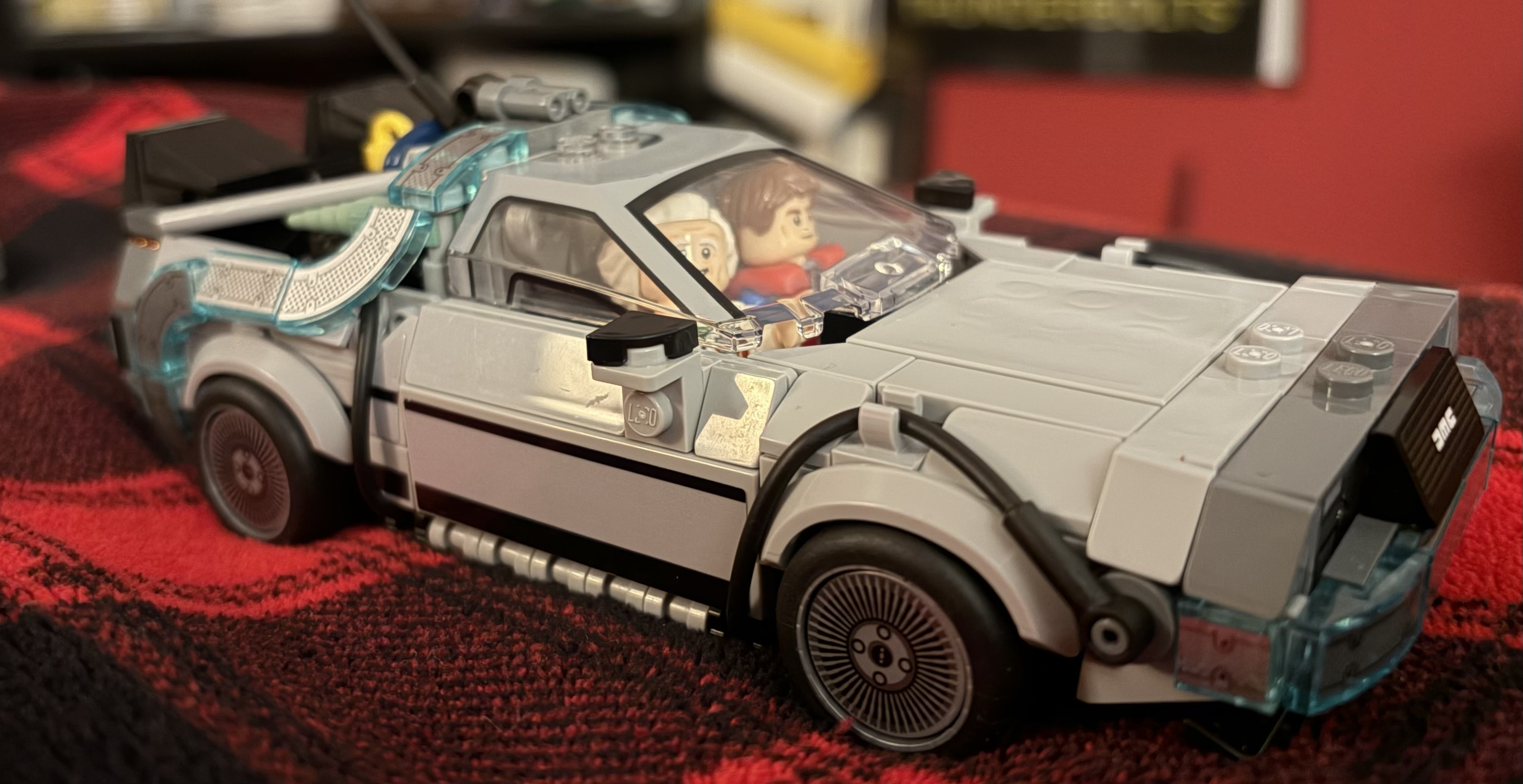
Lego's 2026 DeLorean

Playmobil's DeLorean

Several Lego versions of the DeLorean exist. The first was part of the CUUSOO line (now Lego Ideas) and released in 2013. A second model was created for the toys-to life game Lego Dimensions. A third version was released in 2022 as a Creator Expert (now Icons) set. The latest was released in 2026 as part of the Speed Champions line.

For the 35th anniversary of Back to the Future in 2020, several brands, such as Playmobil and Funko, launched products inspired by the movie.

Hot Wheels also released a small collector's version of the DeLorean for the 35th anniversary, as well as a DeLorean Elite for Back to the Future 30th anniversary in 2015.

The Kids Logic brand released a Back to the Future Part II Magnetic DeLorean in June 2020; it is able to levitate.

== Sources ==
- Boyd, Matt. "The Back to the Future DeLorean" in DieCastX Magazine, Spring 2007, p. 98.
- De Santis, Solange. "Steven Spielberg Builds a Time Machine" in Popular Mechanics, August 1985, pp. 84–87, 132.
- Gaines, Caseen (2015). We Don't Need Roads: The Making of the Back to the Future Trilogy. New York City: Plume, an imprint of Penguin Random House. ISBN 978-0-14-218153-9.
- Iaccino, James F. Jungian Reflections within the Cinema: A Psychological Analysis of Sci-Fi and Fantasy Archetypes, pp. 81–89. Greenwood Publishing Group, 1998. ISBN 0-275-95048-4
- Kaku, Michio. Physics of the Impossible: A Scientific Exploration Into the World of Phasers, Force Fields, Teleportation, and Time Travel. Random House, Inc., 2008. ISBN 0-385-52544-3
- McDermid, Val. A Suitable Job for a Woman: Inside the World of Women Private Eyes. Poisoned Pen Press, 1999. ISBN 1-890208-15-9
- Mowbray, Scott. "Let's Do the Time Warp Again" in Popular Science, March 2002, pp. 46–51.
- Nahin, Paul J. Time Machines: Time Travel in Physics, Metaphysics, and Science Fiction. Springer, 1999. ISBN 0-387-98571-9
- Ní Fhlainn, Sorcha. The Worlds of Back to the Future: Critical Essays on the Films. McFarland, 2010. ISBN 0-7864-4400-2
- Pourroy, Janine (November 1985). "Backyard Adventures - Spielberg Style". Cinefex. No. 24. United States. ISSN 0198-1056.
- Redmond, Sean. Liquid Metal: the Science Fiction Film Reader, pp. 115–122. Wallflower Press, 2004. ISBN 1-903364-87-6.
- Simpson, Philip; Utterson, Andrew; Shepherdson, Karen J. Film Theory: Critical Concepts in Media and Cultural Studies, Volume 2. Taylor & Francis, 2004. ISBN 0-415-25973-8
- Sobchack, Vivian Carol. Screening Space: the American Science Fiction Film. Rutgers University Press, 1997. ISBN 0-8135-2492-X
