= Panthermobile =

Motor vehicle built for The Pink Panther Show

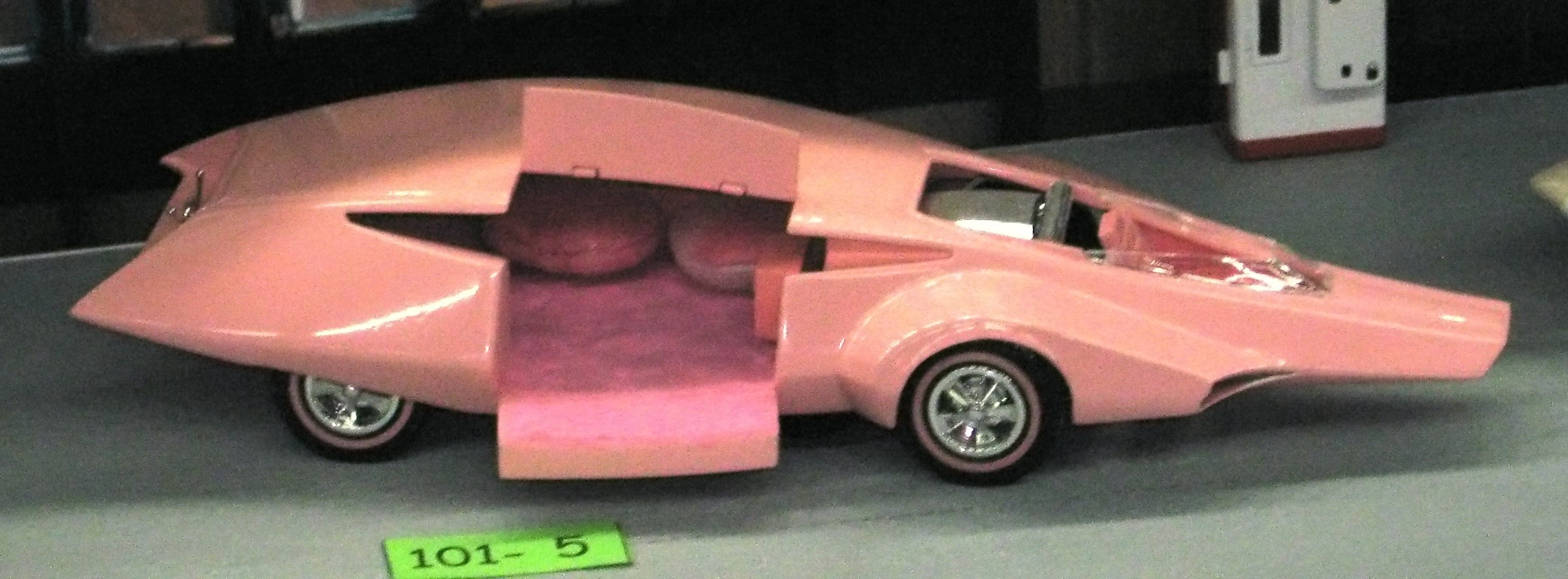
- Model kit of the Panthermobile

Overview
- Production: 1969 (One-Off)
- Designer: Ed “Newt” Newton, Dan Woods, Joe Bailon, Bill “The Leadslinger” Hines, and Bill Honda

Body and chassis
- Body style: Fictional
- Layout: Longitudinally front-engine, front-wheel drive

Powertrain
- Engine: 7.0L Oldsmobile V8
- Transmission: 3-speed TH-425 automatic (Oldsmobile front wheel drive)

The Panthermobile is a show car built for the cartoon TV series The Pink Panther Show.

== Description ==
Called “the world’s most flamboyant vehicle”, the bright pink custom car was designed by Ed Newton and built in 1969 at Bob Reisner California Show Cars by Ed "Newt" Newton, Dan Woods, and customizers Joe Bailon, Bill "The Leadslinger" Hines, and Bill Honda. It was used in the title and credit sequences of the original cartoon.

It was one of several famous television show cars of the era in the US, including the 60s TV Batmobile, the Monkeemobile, and the Munster Koach, and one of many radical contemporary custom cars, such as Red Baron.

The Panthermobile cost $100,000 to build, equivalent to $566,000 in 2025.

== Specifications ==
Built on an Oldsmobile Toronado chassis, it measured 23 ft (7.0 m) long and 6 ft (180 cm) wide, with an exposed driving compartment requiring the driver to wear a helmet. In the cartoon's title sequence, the unknown driver pulls up to Grauman's Chinese Theatre in Hollywood. After a quick edit, the driver removes his helmet presupposing the driver to be a teenage boy. Instead of rearview mirrors, the driver had a camera and black-and-white television monitor. The body is sheet metal.

Behind the open cockpit was a compartment, accessed by a large clamshell door opening to the curb side, which contained pink shag-covered reclining seats, square-tufted upholstery, half a dozen faux-fur pillows, a mobile phone, and a bar. The upholstery was done by Joe Perez.

The seven liter Oldsmobile V8 engine, longitudinally mounted right behind the driver’s head, drove the front wheels. The car was a challenge to drive due to the long snout.

== Ownership ==
For many years the car was owned by promoter Jay Ohrberg before being put up for auction in 2007. It was again put up for auction in 2011 where it was purchased and restored by Galpin Auto Sports in Los Angeles, California, under the supervision of Dave Shuten. A complete restoration of the car's drivetrain, suspension, interior, and paint was required.
