= Jay Ohrberg =

Car builder and collector

Jay Ohrberg is a car collector and car builder specializing in cars for film and television. His company Jay Ohrberg Star Cars has an extensive collection of original cars and replicas, many of them are offered for hire.

Among the vehicles Ohrberg has made are:

- General Lee;
- Ford Gran Torino from Starsky & Hutch;
- KITT for the Knight Rider 2000 film. Ohrberg also built the "super pursuit mode" version for the final season of the TV series;
- Batmobiles for the 1970s films and for the Tim Burton films Batman and Batman Returns;
- DeLorean from Back to the Future
- Flintstones car.
- Panthermobile car.

Ohrberg's car collection includes many film and television cars, including most of the cars that have been designed from his company. Most important of them are:

- From films:
  - the DeLorean (replica) from Back to the Future,
  - several cars from the live-action Flintstones film,
  - Ecto-1 (replica) from Ghostbusters,
  - the Ford Gran Torino from Starsky & Hutch,
  - Herbie (replica) from Herbie the Love Bug and other cars including a Chitty Chitty Bang Bang replica,
  - RoboCop car,
  - a Mad Max replica car and other films.
- From TV shows:
  - Several of the main vehicles from TV shows including The A-Team,
  - The Beverly Hillbillies,
  - Knight Rider,
  - Miami Vice,
  - and the Munsters. He has also replicas of other fictional cars.

Other customized cars in Ohrberg's collection include a helicopter car and a 100-foot limousine called the American Dream, recognized by Guinness World Records as the world's longest car. Ohrberg was first recognized as a car collector after buying an automobile every week for 57 weeks straight.

== See also ==
- George Barris, another auto customizer.
