= Too Fat to Stand-Up =

Live album by Arnie States
- Released: November 10, 2014
- Recorded: October 18, 2014 at the Silver Legacy Casino in Reno, NV
- Genre: Comedy
- Length: 80:12
- Label: Arnie States

Too Fat to Stand-Up is the debut comedy album released by stand-up comedian Arnie States from The Rob, Arnie, and Dawn Show.

== Background ==
The album was recorded on October 18, 2014 at his sold-out show at The Silver Legacy Casino in Reno, Nevada. The audio CD was released for sale on the show's website and the digital download of the audio CD was available on iTunes on November 10, 2014 where it has peaked at #3 on the U.S. iTunes Comedy Charts. His album also debuted at #4 on the Billboard Comedy Albums.

== CD track listing ==
1. Porno Lovers
2. The Donkey Show
3. Crank Calls
4. Erectile Dysfunction
5. Side Effects
6. Cyclists
7. Going Back to the Gym
8. Women Have All the Power
9. Foreigners at a Museum
10. My First Blow Job
11. My Bad Gift Curse
12. The Fart That Ended My Marriage
13. Weather Reporters
14. The Ocean
15. Urban Legends
16. My Grandmother
17. My Father
18. I Am Addicted to TV
19. Arnie vs the Dough Boy
20. Botched Surgeries
21. Crank Up Your Weight Loss
22. Dating Naked
23. My Trip to the Nut House
24. Taking Rob to the Emergency Room

=== Video release ===
A DVD and Blu-ray release was released in February 2015 which included hours of behind the scenes footage of "Making Arnie The Comic" as well as two full previous performances.

== Chart positions ==
Chart (2014)	Peak position
US Billboard Top Comedy Albums	4
