= The Rob, Arnie, and Dawn Show =

The Rob, Anybody, and Dawn Show
- Genre: Talk, News & Comedy
- Running time: 4 hours
- Country of origin: United States
- Language: English
- Home station: KDOT in Reno, Nevada
- Starring: Rob Williams, Dawn Rossi (former host), Arnie States (former host)
- Created by: Rob Williams

The Rob, Anybody, and Dawn Show (Formerly: The Rob, Arnie, and Dawn Show, and The Rob, Nobody, and Dawn Show) was a former morning radio show on KDOT (104.5 FM) from Lotus' building in Reno, Nevada. Rob Williams and Dawn Rossi were the show's hosts for its entire run, with the "Anybody" being represented by the Production Team and the listeners. Former host Arnie States was an original member of the show before being fired in 2016.

The show existed in various forms within various cities in the western United States such as Reno, Seattle and Sacramento. Most recently, it was a call-in show.

On June 29, 2025, the show posted on their Facebook page that they had "officially" started their summer vacation and would return on July 7. On July 7, rather than returning to live shows, listeners found a "best of" show playing with no official word from the show as to why. On July 28, rather than a "best of" show, KDOT had an extended period of dead air. A Message from Producer Kyle said that he had not been paid for a month and was not doing anymore 'best of' shows. The Morning of July 29, co-host Dawn Rossi posted on Instagram that she was ending her career in broadcasting and thanked the fans and people from the show. A screen shot of the letter was posted to Reddit. No explanation was made for the sudden end to the show.

== Show hosts ==
=== Rob Williams ===
Born September 17, 1971, in Albuquerque, New Mexico, raised in Pleasanton, California, he attended Ohlone College in Fremont, California and joined the KRLT morning show in Lake Tahoe in 1991. Williams hired Dawn Rossi, with whom he went on to work at a country music radio station.

On November 3, 2023, Rob was pulled over for multiple vehicle violations in Auburn, CA and arrested on suspicion of DUI. After posting bond he was released. He pleaded nolo contendere on February 3, 2025, and was sentenced to 3 years probation per Placer County court records.

=== Dawn Rossi ===
Born January 17, 1970, Rossi grew up in Orangevale, California. She began pursuing a career in radio at age 20, after attending broadcasting school. Rob Williams, at the time 19 years old and the program director, offered her the Friday overnight shift at his station. Williams subsequently offered her a midday slot at his station in Lake Tahoe. The company Rossi, Williams and States worked for was sold to a new company and eventually switched formats from country to rock. Williams and States later invited Rossi to join their morning show. On July 29, 2025, Dawn posted an update on her Instagram page saying goodbye to the fans.

=== Arnie States ===
Born September 17, 1971, in Garland, Texas, States met Rob Williams in a bar in Reno, Nevada, and Williams offered States an internship at his station. When the woman who did the morning show left the station, States joined Williams as a co-host.

On October 22, 2012, States attempted suicide, resulting in a three-week hiatus from the show. He returned to the show November 13, 2012.

On March 10, 2015, after a month-long personal leave of absence, the show and website removed all trace of Arnie's name. Following the show that day, Rob released the following statement "In the interest of Arnie's privacy, I can't talk about the circumstances (which is why it cannot and will not be addressed publicly beyond this), but I can confirm that Arnie is no longer on the show."

On April 13, 2015, Arnie States returned to KRXQ on a local (non-syndicated) afternoon radio show from 3pm-7pm, named The Dog Pound (an ensemble of 3 male hosts - Craig "The Dog Faced Boy", Joe Maumee, and lastly, Arnie States). As of September 1, 2016 Arnie States is no longer working for KRXQ.

In 2016 Arnie States started hosting his own show on KUUB FM ESPN RADIO 94.5 in Reno, Nevada: The Arnie States Sports Show. He was released from the station due to budget cuts as of February 7, 2017.

As of June 2, 2017, States hosts the Arnie States Show (A.S.S.) from 7-11 Monday through Friday through the streaming application Mixlr.

States has appeared on the Travel Channel show "Man vs. Food". The comedy CD from his "Too Fat To Stand-Up" comedy show peaked at #3 on the U.S. iTunes Comedy Charts and #4 on the Billboard Comedy Albums.

Chart (2014)	Peak position
US Billboard Top Comedy Albums	4

== The Rob, Arnie, and Sports Show ==
In February 2011, Rob and Arnie began The Rob, Arnie, and Sports Show. It aired in afternoon drive on ESPN 1320 in Sacramento, and was also syndicated on ESPN 94.5 in Reno, NV. The show ended in late July 2011, due to the demands of performing both morning drive and afternoon drive shows.

== Controversies ==
=== Remarks about transgender youth ===
On May 28, 2009, Rob and Arnie engaged in a 30-minute conversation in which they described transgender people as "freaks" and "idiots." Arnie said, "You know, my favorite part about hearing these stories about the kids in high school, who the entire high school caters around, lets the boy wear the dress. I look forward to when they go out into society and society beats them down. And they end up in therapy." Arnie also said, "If my son, God forbid, if my son put on a pair of high heels, I would probably hit him with one of my shoes." Subsequently, the Gay and Lesbian Alliance Against Defamation (GLAAD) and others demanded an apology. Arnie declined to apologize, on the grounds that he was joking and not actually advocating violence against children. He said, "I didn't do anything wrong."

In response to the transphobia controversy, Snapple, Sonic Drive-In, Chipotle Mexican Grill, Bank of America, Verizon, Carl's Jr., Wells Fargo, AT&T and McDonald's pulled their advertising from KRXQ. Nissan also announced that they will not renew their expired KRXQ advertising contract.

=== Remarks about the Boston Marathon bombings and suspension ===
On April 16, 2013, Rob, Arnie, and Dawn made jokes about the bombings of the Boston Marathon, which had taken place the day before. Using fake Boston accents, the trio talked about people losing their limbs, and went on to discuss how one couple's relationship might change after a man who went to see his girlfriend at the finish line lost his legs. Rival radio station host, CBS's Don Geronimo, criticized the show for its remarks. On April 17, 2013, KRXQ in Sacramento pulled the show off the air, with no word on whether it would return. In response to their suspension, Rob, Arnie, and Dawn posted an explanation in protest on their own website, blaming Geronimo for their suspension. On the following Monday, the show was put back on the air.

== States leaving the show ==
On March 10, 2015, www.robarnieanddawn.com was redirected to radradio.com. The website featured a new redesign and logo, with the name 'Arnie' crossed out and replaced with the word 'nobody', which was later changed to 'anybody'. States is not mentioned on the website at all, and features he used to do are now taken over by other members of the staff. "Personal leave of absence" is the official statement on why he left the show.
