= Newcastle, California =

Unincorporated community in Placer County, California

Newcastle
- census-designated place & unincorporated community
- Position in California. Newcastle (the United States)
- Coordinates: 38°52′20″N 121°07′50″W
- Country: United States
- State: California
- County: Placer

Area
  - Total: 2.396 sq mi (6.206 km^{2})
  - Land: 2.392 sq mi (6.195 km^{2})
  - Water: 0.0042 sq mi (0.011 km^{2}) 0.18%
- Elevation: 797 ft (243 m)

Population (2020)
  - Total: 1,321
  - Density: 552.3/sq mi (213.2/km^{2})
- Time zone: UTC-8 (Pacific (PST))
  - Summer (DST): UTC-7 (PDT)
- ZIP Code: 95658
- Area codes: 916, 279
- GNIS feature ID: 2583089

Newcastle is an unincorporated community and census-designated place (CDP) in Placer County, California. Nestled in the Sierra Nevada foothills, Newcastle is located 8 miles (12.9 km) northeast of Rocklin and 31 miles northeast of Sacramento. Newcastle generally has moderate winters and warm summers.

As of the 2020 U.S. Census, Newcastle had a population of 1,321.

== History ==
Newcastle was founded in the 19th century. According to Transcontinental Railroad Landmarks the "Regular freight and passenger trains began operating over the first 31 miles of Central Pacific's line to Newcastle June 10, 1864, when political opposition and lack of money stopped further construction during that mild winter. Construction was resumed in April, 1865." The region is also in the vicinity of what was the cradle of "gold country", where in the mid-19th century a flurry of miners and gold prospectors searched for their fortune. During this time, however, the town of Newcastle was known more for its orchards rather than abundant gold mines.

The Newcastle post office opened in 1864.

== Geography ==
According to the United States Census Bureau, the CDP covers an area of 2.4 square miles (6.2 km^{2}), 99.82% of it land, and 0.18% of it water.

== Demographics ==
Historical population
Census	Pop.	Note	%±
2010	1,224		—
2020	1,321		7.9%
U.S. Decennial Census; 2000 2010

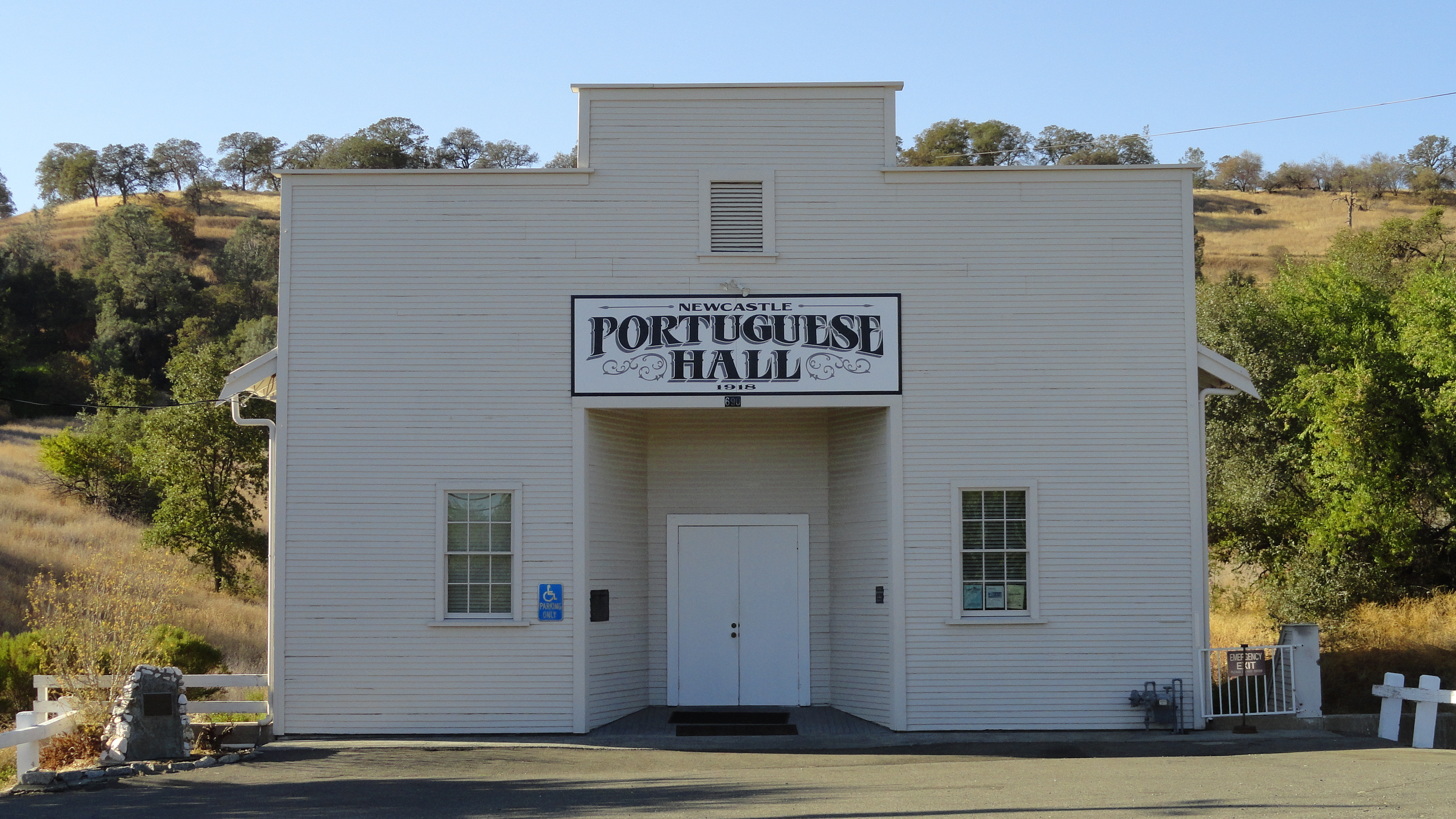
Portuguese Hall in Newcastle is listed on the National Register of Historic Places

=== 2020 census ===
As of the 2020 census, Newcastle had a population of 1,321, with a population density of 552.3 inhabitants per square mile (213.2/km^{2}).

83.3% of residents lived in urban areas, while 16.7% lived in rural areas. The census reported that 1,317 people (99.7% of the population) lived in households, 4 (0.3%) lived in non-institutionalized group quarters, and no one was institutionalized.

Racial composition as of the 2020 census
Race	Number	Percent
White	1,095	82.9%
Black or African American	8	0.6%
American Indian and Alaska Native	6	0.5%
Asian	16	1.2%
Native Hawaiian and Other Pacific Islander	0	0.0%
Some other race	42	3.2%
Two or more races	154	11.7%
Hispanic or Latino (of any race)	121	9.2%

There were 565 households, out of which 122 (21.6%) had children under the age of 18 living in them. Of all households, 47.6% were married-couple households, 18.4% were households with a male householder and no spouse or partner present, and 29.7% were households with a female householder and no spouse or partner present. About 32.2% of all households were made up of individuals, and 20.7% had someone living alone who was 65 years of age or older. The average household size was 2.33, and there were 353 families (62.5% of all households).

The age distribution was 250 people (18.9%) under the age of 18, 88 people (6.7%) aged 18 to 24, 258 people (19.5%) aged 25 to 44, 390 people (29.5%) aged 45 to 64, and 335 people (25.4%) who were 65 years of age or older. The median age was 50.3 years. For every 100 females, there were 87.1 males, and for every 100 females age 18 and over, there were 85.3 males age 18 and over.

There were 621 housing units at an average density of 259.6 units per square mile (100.2 units/km^{2}), of which 565 (91.0%) were occupied. Of these, 466 (82.5%) were owner-occupied, and 99 (17.5%) were occupied by renters. Of all housing units, 9.0% were vacant; the homeowner vacancy rate was 2.9% and the rental vacancy rate was 4.8%.

=== 2010 census ===
Newcastle first appeared as a census designated place in the 2010 U.S. census.

== Notable people ==
- Bud Anderson - World War II "triple Ace".
- Joe Bailon - automobile customizer and creator of the paint color Candy Apple Red.
- George S. Nixon - U.S. Senator from Nevada.
- Jason Rhoades - artist.
- John Rudometkin - professional basketball player.
