= KLVB (FM) =

K-Love radio station in Lincoln, California

Coordinates: 38.876°N 121.126°W

- Lincoln, California; United States
- Broadcast area: Sacramento metropolitan area
- Frequency: 103.9 MHz
- Branding: K-Love

Programming
- Format: Christian adult contemporary

Ownership
- Owner: Educational Media Foundation; (K-LOVE, Inc.)
- Sister stations: KARA; KLRS; KSAI

History
- First air date: November 8, 1974
- Former call signs: KHEX (1974–1979); KXEZ (1979–1989); KXCL (1989–2005); KVMG (2005); KKFS (2005-2025)
- Call sign meaning: "K-Love"

Technical information
- Licensing authority: FCC
- Facility ID: 56366
- Class: A
- ERP: 6,000 watts
- HAAT: 100 meters (330 ft)

Links
- Public license information: Public file; LMS
- Webcast: Listen live
- Website: klove.com

KLVB (103.9 FM) is a radio station licensed to Lincoln, California, and serving the Sacramento metropolitan area. The station carries a Christian adult contemporary format and is owned by the Educational Media Foundation (EMF). The station operates as part of EMF's K-Love network.

KLVB has an effective radiated power (ERP) of 6,000 watts. The transmitter is on Cherry Hill Road near Interstate 80 in Newcastle.

== History ==
On November 8, 1974, the station first signed on the air. Its original city of license was Yuba City and it held the call sign KHEX.

In 2003, the station was sold to First Broadcasting which relaunched the station with an all 1980's music format and using the moniker "Flash 103.9".

In 2005, the station was sold to Bustos Media which then spun the station off to Salem Communications. Salem moved the company's "Fish" contemporary Christian music format over from 105.5 to 103.9. Then 105.5 flipped to a business news and information format as KSAC-FM.

In December 2024, it was announced that Salem Media sold KKFS and six other stations to Educational Media Foundation, the company that operates both the K-Love and Air1 networks. A few weeks later, it was announced that the station will begin airing K-Love, with operation under EMF beginning February 1, 2025. KKFS and KLVB (99.5 FM) changed call signs that same day. 99.5 a couple of weeks later flipped to its sister network Air1.
