= Joe Bailon =

American industrial designer

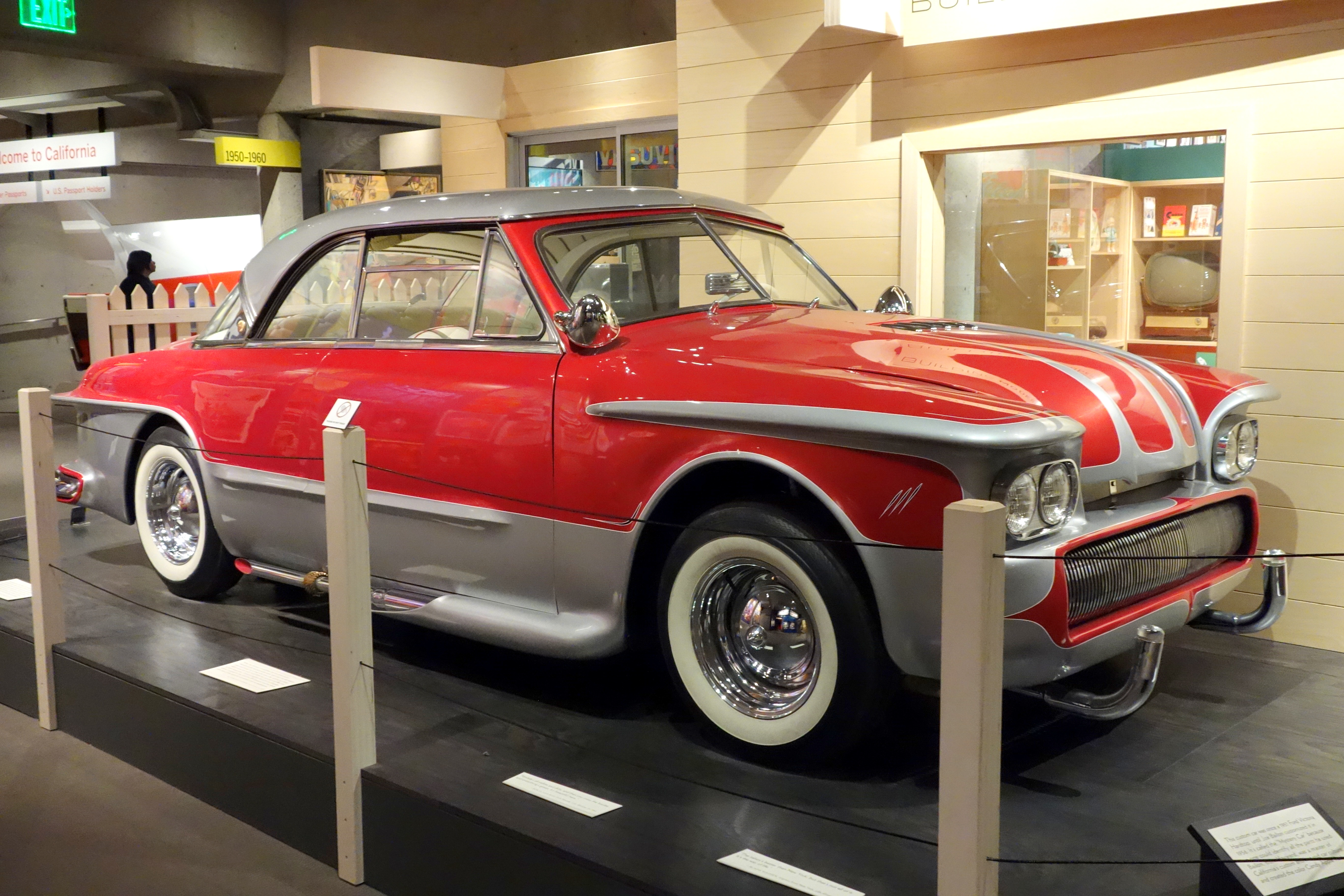
Custom car based on a 1951 Ford Victoria Hardtop, created by Joe Bailon in 1956

Joe Bailon (March 18, 1923 – September 25, 2017) was an American car customizer credited with creating the paint color Candy Apple Red, which eventually led to a full spectrum of candy paint colors, each with a metallic base-coat, a transparent color coat, and a final clear coat.

Bailon customized such cars as Zsa Zsa Gabor's Rolls-Royce, Danny Thomas' Continental, Dean Martin's Cadillac station wagon, and Sammy Davis Jr.'s, Chevrolet Vega wagon. Joe built the Oldsmobile Toronado-powered Panthermobile. He was an inductee of the National Rod & Custom Museum Hall of Fame.

The San Francisco Rod, Custom and Motorcycle Show annually gives the Joe Bailon Elegance Award for the visual appearance of the paint, interior, engine, design, and suspension. The trophy, unique for the award, features a Candy Apple Red apple, painted by Bailon.

Bailon, who grew up in Newcastle, California, as the youngest of ten children, later worked in the Richmond Shipyards prior to fighting in World War II, and thereafter turned to customizing cars. He lived in Auburn, California until his death on September 25, 2017 at the age of 94.
