= KVMX-FM =

- Placerville, California; United States
- Broadcast area: Sacramento, California
- Frequency: 92.1 MHz
- Branding: La Ranchera 92.1 Y 105.5 SuperStation

Programming
- Format: Regional Mexican
- Affiliations: Las Vegas Raiders Spanish Radio Network

Ownership
- Owner: Lotus Communications; (Lotus Sacramento Corp.)
- Sister stations: KSAC, KSAC-FM

History
- First air date: December 9, 1982
- Former call signs: KHTN (1981–1990); KWWN (1990–1992); KZSA (1992–2004); KRLL (2004); KREL (2004–2005); KBDB-FM (2005); KXCL (2005–2007); KCCL (2007–2013); KMJE (2013–2014); KMJE-FM (2014–2017); KMJE (2017–2019)

Technical information
- Licensing authority: FCC
- Facility ID: 36028
- Class: A
- ERP: 6,000 watts
- HAAT: 100 meters (330 ft)
- Transmitter coordinates: 38°38′10.5″N 120°38′14″W
- Repeater: 105.5 KSAC-FM (Dunnigan)

Links
- Public license information: Public file; LMS
- Webcast: Listen live
- Website: www.radiolaranchera.net

KVMX-FM (92.1 MHz) is a radio station licensed to Placerville, California, United States, and serving the Sacramento area with a regional Mexican format, branded as "La Ranchera". The station is currently owned by Lotus Communications, who bought the then-KMJE from Results Radio on September 3, 2013, and took over ownership on December 10, 2013. It is also broadcasting on AM at 890, known as KSAC, which signed on as KMJE in the summer of 2014.

== History ==
=== Classic country: 2004-2005 ===
From November 17, 2003 - March 15, 2005, the station was known as "Real Country 92.1" under the call letters KRLL, and later KREL.

=== Adult hits: 2005 ===
From March 15, 2005, to August 1, 2005, the station was known as "92.1 Bob FM" under the call letters KBDB-FM.

=== '80s hits: 2005-2007 ===
From August 1, 2005, to January 5, 2007, the station was known as "Flash 92.1" under the call letters KXCL.

=== Classic hits: 2007-2013 ===
From January 5, 2007, to May 29, 2013, that station was known as "K-Hits" under the call letter KCCL. The classic hits format then moved to 101.5 FM.

=== Spanish adult contemporary: 2013-2017 ===
In 2013, the station was sold to Lotus Communications. On December 10, 2013, the station became "Vive 92.1" initially with Spanish Holiday music programming. During this period, the call letters were KMJE, and later KMJE-FM.

=== Regional Mexican: 2017-present ===
In July 2017, KMJE dropped the Vive branding in favor of a Regional Mexican format under the name "La Buena." The station changed its call sign to KVMX-FM on March 1, 2019. The name was later changed to "La Ranchera".
