= KTKZ =

Radio station in Sacramento, California

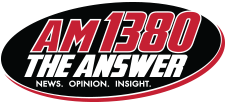
- Sacramento, California; United States
- Broadcast area: Sacramento metropolitan area
- Frequency: 1380 kHz
- Branding: AM 1380 The Answer

Programming
- Format: Conservative talk radio
- Affiliations: Salem Radio Network; Townhall News; USA Radio Network

Ownership
- Owner: Salem Media Group; (New Inspiration Broadcasting Company, Inc.)
- Sister stations: KFIA

History
- First air date: 1952
- Former call signs: KGMS (1952–1985); KSMJ (1985–1995); KIMN (1995–1995); KMJI (1995–1997)
- Call sign meaning: "Talk"

Technical information
- Licensing authority: FCC
- Facility ID: 59599
- Class: B
- Power: 5,000 watts
- Transmitter coordinates: 38°30′28.7″N 121°34′49.8″W (day); 38°33′26.7″N 121°10′54.8″W (night)

Links
- Public license information: Public file; LMS
- Webcast: Listen live
- Website: am1380theanswer.com

KTKZ (1380 AM, "The Answer") is a commercial radio station in Sacramento, California. It is one of four Sacramento-area radio stations owned by the Salem Media Group. KTKZ airs a conservative talk radio format, mostly featuring syndicated shows from the co-owned Salem Radio Network.

KTKZ operates at 5,000 watts with separate daytime and nighttime transmitter sites. A directional antenna is used at all times to avoid interfering with other stations on AM 1380.

== Programming ==
Weekdays begin with a local talk and information show hosted by Phil Cowan. Cowan's show is followed by syndicated shows with hosts Dennis Prager, Sebastian Gorka, Larry Elder, Jay Sekulow, Eric Metaxas, and Hugh Hewitt. Weekends feature programs on health, money, law, real estate and travel, some of which are paid brokered programming. Weekend hosts include Bruce DuMont and Rudy Maxa, as well as repeats of weekday shows. Most hours begin with news from Townhall News.

== History ==
In 1952, the station signed on as KGMS. It was owned by Capitol Radio Enterprises, with studios in the Hotel Senator. KGMS was originally a daytimer, powered at 1,000 watts and required to go off the air from sunset to sunrise.

In 1997, the Salem Media Group paid $1.5 million to buy the station. On May 15, 2013, KTKZ was re-branded as "AM 1380 The Answer".
