= KFIA (AM) =

- Carmichael, California; United States
- Broadcast area: Sacramento metropolitan area
- Frequency: 710 kHz
- Branding: 710 AM and 105.7 FM The Word

Programming
- Format: Christian radio
- Affiliations: SRN News

Ownership
- Owner: Salem Media Group; (New Inspiration Broadcasting Company, Inc.)
- Sister stations: KTKZ

History
- First air date: January 11, 1979
- Call sign meaning: Keeping Faith In America

Technical information
- Licensing authority: FCC
- Facility ID: 50300
- Class: B
- Power: 25,000 watts (day); 1,000 watts (night)
- Transmitter coordinates: 38°49′57.6″N 121°19′6.8″W
- Translator: 105.7 K289CT (Sacramento)

Links
- Public license information: Public file; LMS
- Webcast: Listen live
- Website: thewordsacramento.com

KFIA (710 AM) is a commercial radio station broadcasting a Christian radio format. Licensed to Carmichael, California, the station serves the Sacramento metropolitan area. The station is currently owned by New Inspiration Broadcasting Company, Inc. which is a part of Salem Media Group.

KFIA is powered at 25,000 watts by day. But because 710 AM is a clear channel frequency reserved for Class A stations KIRO Seattle and WOR New York City, KFIA must greatly reduce power at night to 1,000 watts. It uses a directional antenna at all times. The transmitter is off North Foothills Boulevard at Athens Avenue in Rocklin. KFIA programming is also heard on 250 watt FM translator K289CT 105.7 MHz in Sacramento. This is one of the coastal stations which sends the day beam away from the city so that Seattle and LA are protected.

== History ==
On January 11, 1979, the station signed on the air. It was owned by Olympic Broadcasters and was powered at only 250 watts. KFIA has maintained the same call sign and religious format for its entire time on the air.

New Inspiration Broadcasting, a subsidiary of the Salem Media Group, acquired the station in 1995.
