= KSAC (AM) =

Radio station in Olivehurst–Sacramento, California

- Olivehurst, California; United States
- Broadcast area: Sacramento Valley
- Frequency: 890 kHz
- Branding: Fox Sports Sacramento

Programming
- Language: English
- Format: Sports radio

Ownership
- Owner: Lotus Communications; (Lotus Sacramento Corp.)
- Sister stations: KSAC-FM, KVMX-FM

History
- First air date: 2014; 12 years ago
- Former call signs: KDDP (2012–2014); KMJE (2014–2017); KVMX (2017–2024)
- Call sign meaning: Sacramento

Technical information
- Licensing authority: FCC
- Facility ID: 160999
- Class: B
- Power: 10,000 watts (day); 270 watts (night)
- Transmitter coordinates: 38°30′28.67″N 121°34′49.84″W
- Repeater: 104.7 K284CM (Sacramento)

Links
- Public license information: Public file; LMS
- Website: foxsportssac.com

KSAC (890 kHz) is a Class B AM radio station in Olivehurst, California, operating with 10,000 watts of power during the day and 270 watts at night. The station is owned by Lotus Communications through licensee Lotus Sacramento Corp. and targets the Sacramento area. KSAC's programming previously was entirely devoted to The Rob, Anybody, and Dawn Show. It also broadcasts via translator K284CM on 104.7 MHz, licensed to Sacramento.

As 890 AM is a United States clear-channel frequency, KSAC must reduce nighttime power to 270 watts to prevent interference to the skywave signal of WLS in Chicago, Illinois, a Class A station.

== History ==
The station signed on in the summer of 2014 as KMJE, carrying programming from sister FM station KMJE-FM.

On June 30, 2016, KMJE was granted a construction permit to move its night transmitter site to the day transmitter site at KTKZ and decrease night power to 270 watts. The station then changed its call sign to KVMX on April 17, 2017. As of January 16, 2024, the call sign is KSAC.

On November 13, 2023, KVMX broke from its simulcast with KVMX-FM (the former KMJE-FM) and KSAC-FM and relaunched as "RAD Radio", devoting its entire lineup to The Rob, Anybody, and Dawn Show. The program is carried live in morning drive and repeated in afternoon drive and the overnight hours; other time periods feature archival segments.

On September 2, 2024, KSAC changed their format from talk to sports, branded as "Fox Sports Sacramento".

== Translator ==
Broadcast translator for KSAC
Call sign	Frequency	City of license	FID	ERP (W)	Class	Transmitter coordinates	FCC info
K284CM	104.7 FM	Sacramento, California	144146	250	D	38°35′15.7″N 121°29′25.8″W	LMS
