= Dunnigan, California =

Dunnigan
- census-designated place
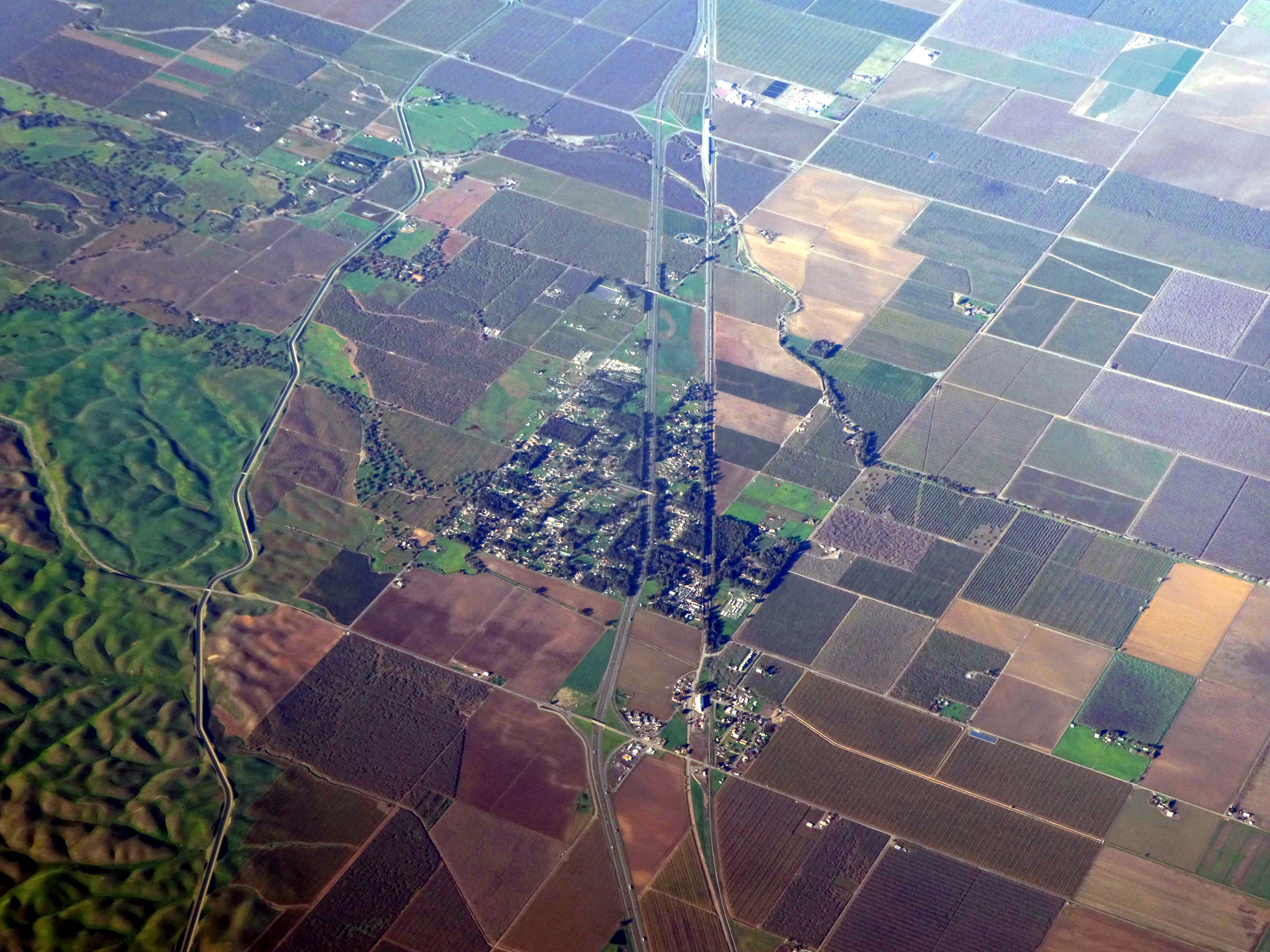
- Aerial view of Dunnigan in December 2021

- Location in California
- Coordinates: 38°53′07″N 121°58′11″W
- Country: United States
- State: California
- County: Yolo

Area
  - Total: 5.23 sq mi (13.55 km^{2})
  - Land: 5.23 sq mi (13.55 km^{2})
  - Water: 0 sq mi (0.00 km^{2}) 0%
- Elevation: 69 ft (21 m)

Population (2020)
  - Total: 1,382
  - Density: 264.1/sq mi (101.98/km^{2})
- ZIP code: 95937
- Area code: 530
- FIPS code: 06-20228
- GNIS feature IDs: 222740, 2583003

Dunnigan (formerly, Antelope) is a census-designated place in Yolo County, California, United States on Interstate 5. The population was 1,382 at the 2020 census. Dunnigan's ZIP code is 95937 and its area code 530. It lies at an elevation of 69 feet (21 m).

== History ==
The land is historically the territory of the Patwin.

The town of Dunnigan was founded as Antelope by two early settlers, J. S. Copp and Jolin Wilson. During the year 1853 they were living down nearer the Sacramento River, but the winter flood washed them on to higher ground and they settled on new claims here. Next year, A. W. Dunnigan, a Yolo County postal worker, came and gave name to the place. With him were Henry Yarick and Abial Barker, the former going into the hotel business with Dunnigan, the inn being known as "Dunnigan's." Other neighbors were Irving W. and William Brownell, Isaac Rice, D. T. Bird, Harry Porterfield and M. A. Rahm. The first store was opened in 1866 by G. B. Lewis, who sold out to William Earll. Z. J. Brown was the proprietor of a drug and notion store for several years, after which he was succeeded by G. W. Gray. In 1876 the railroad came along, and the town plat of Dunnigan was filed for record at the county seat November 1 of that year.

A post office opened in 1856, the name was changed from Antelope to Dunnigan in 1876.

== Geography ==
Dunnigan is located 11 miles (18 km) from Arbuckle and nearly 40 miles (64 km) from Vacaville and Sacramento.

According to the United States Census Bureau, the community is approximately 5.2 sq mi (13.2 km^{2}); all land.

=== Climate ===
According to the Köppen Climate Classification system, Dunnigan has a hot-summer Mediterranean climate, abbreviated "Csa" on climate maps.

Climate data for Dunnigan, California
Month	Jan	Feb	Mar	Apr	May	Jun	Jul	Aug	Sep	Oct	Nov	Dec	Year
Record high °F (°C)	80 (27)	83 (28)	85 (29)	95 (35)	107 (42)	113 (45)	115 (46)	117 (47)	110 (43)	107 (42)	90 (32)	78 (26)	117 (47)
Mean daily maximum °F (°C)	57 (14)	62 (17)	66 (19)	73 (23)	82 (28)	91 (33)	96 (36)	96 (36)	91 (33)	81 (27)	66 (19)	58 (14)	77 (25)
Mean daily minimum °F (°C)	35 (2)	38 (3)	40 (4)	43 (6)	49 (9)	55 (13)	58 (14)	58 (14)	57 (14)	47 (8)	39 (4)	34 (1)	46 (8)
Record low °F (°C)	5 (−15)	19 (−7)	21 (−6)	26 (−3)	31 (−1)	37 (3)	43 (6)	42 (6)	37 (3)	28 (−2)	16 (−9)	11 (−12)	5 (−15)
Average precipitation inches (mm)	3.82 (97)	3.56 (90)	2.63 (67)	0.93 (24)	0.35 (8.9)	0.1 (2.5)	0.03 (0.76)	0.04 (1.0)	0.2 (5.1)	0.92 (23)	2.56 (65)	2.83 (72)	17.97 (456.26)
Average snowfall inches (cm)	0.7 (1.8)	0 (0)	0 (0)	0 (0)	0 (0)	0 (0)	0 (0)	0 (0)	0 (0)	0 (0)	0 (0)	0.1 (0.25)	0.8 (2.0)

== Demographics ==
Historical population
Census	Pop.	Note	%±
2010	1,416		—
2020	1,382		−2.4%
U.S. Decennial Census; 1850–1870 1880-1890; 1900 1910 1920; 1930 1940 1950; 1960 1970 1980; 1990 2000 2010

Dunnigan first appeared as a census designated place in the 2010 U.S. census.

=== 2020 census ===
As of the 2020 census, Dunnigan had a population of 1,382. The population density was 264.1 inhabitants per square mile (102.0/km^{2}). The median age was 41.8 years. The age distribution was 311 people (22.5%) under the age of 18, 129 people (9.3%) aged 18 to 24, 292 people (21.1%) aged 25 to 44, 362 people (26.2%) aged 45 to 64, and 288 people (20.8%) who were 65 years of age or older. For every 100 females there were 100.9 males, and for every 100 females age 18 and over there were 107.2 males age 18 and over.

The Census reported that the whole population lived in households. There were 491 households, out of which 165 (33.6%) had children under the age of 18 living in them, 272 (55.4%) were married-couple households, 34 (6.9%) were cohabiting couple households, 106 (21.6%) had a female householder with no spouse or partner present, and 79 (16.1%) had a male householder with no spouse or partner present. Of all households, 106 (21.6%) were one person, and 69 (14.1%) were one person aged 65 or older. The average household size was 2.81. There were 358 families (72.9% of all households).

There were 519 housing units, of which 491 (94.6%) were occupied and 28 (5.4%) were vacant. Of the occupied units, 388 (79.0%) were owner-occupied and 103 (21.0%) were occupied by renters. The homeowner vacancy rate was 0.8% and the rental vacancy rate was 3.7%.

0.0% of residents lived in urban areas, while 100.0% lived in rural areas.

Racial composition as of the 2020 census
Race	Number	Percent
White	587	42.5%
Black or African American	72	5.2%
American Indian and Alaska Native	14	1.0%
Asian	16	1.2%
Native Hawaiian and Other Pacific Islander	7	0.5%
Some other race	505	36.5%
Two or more races	181	13.1%
Hispanic or Latino (of any race)	764	55.3%

=== 2010 census ===
The 2010 United States census reported that Dunnigan had a population of 1,416. The population density was 271.0 inhabitants per square mile (104.6/km^{2}). The racial makeup of Dunnigan was 836 (59.0%) White, 107 (7.6%) African American, 25 (1.8%) Native American, 19 (1.3%) Asian, 1 (0.1%) Pacific Islander, 339 (23.9%) from other races, and 89 (6.3%) from two or more races. Hispanic or Latino of any race were 583 persons (41.2%).

The Census reported that 1,416 people (100% of the population) lived in households, 0 (0%) lived in non-institutionalized group quarters, and 0 (0%) were institutionalized.

There were 504 households, out of which 165 (32.7%) had children under the age of 18 living in them, 284 (56.3%) were opposite-sex married couples living together, 53 (10.5%) had a female householder with no husband present, 28 (5.6%) had a male householder with no wife present. There were 28 (5.6%) unmarried opposite-sex partnerships, and 2 (0.4%) same-sex married couples or partnerships. 115 households (22.8%) were made up of individuals, and 52 (10.3%) had someone living alone who was 65 years of age or older. The average household size was 2.81. There were 365 families (72.4% of all households); the average family size was 3.33.

The population was spread out, with 362 people (25.6%) under the age of 18, 103 people (7.3%) aged 18 to 24, 298 people (21.0%) aged 25 to 44, 372 people (26.3%) aged 45 to 64, and 281 people (19.8%) who were 65 years of age or older. The median age was 41.7 years. For every 100 females, there were 91.1 males. For every 100 females age 18 and over, there were 93.8 males.

There were 558 housing units at an average density of 106.8 per square mile (41.2/km^{2}), of which 407 (80.8%) were owner-occupied, and 97 (19.2%) were occupied by renters. The homeowner vacancy rate was 1.9%; the rental vacancy rate was 16.7%. 1,076 people (76.0% of the population) lived in owner-occupied housing units and 340 people (24.0%) lived in rental housing units.

Since the housing boom of the early 2000s, several high scale homes have been built in the Dunnigan area. The area east of Interstate 5 has seen the majority of the recent housing boom. Of particular interest to buyers and current residents is the large lots that are available for reasonable prices compared to the adjacent Sacramento market.

== Education ==
Dunnigan is served by the Pierce Joint Unified School District.
