= KSAI (FM) =

Air1 radio station in Citrus Heights, California

- Citrus Heights, California; United States
- Broadcast area: Sacramento metropolitan area
- Frequency: 99.5 MHz (HD Radio)
- Branding: Air1

Programming
- Format: Contemporary worship music
- Subchannels: HD2: K-Love Eras
- Network: Air1

Ownership
- Owner: Educational Media Foundation; (K-Love, Inc.)
- Sister stations: KARA; KLRS; KLVB

History
- First air date: September 1997
- Former call signs: KJFA (1989–1997); KLVS (1997–2010); KSTN (2010); KLVB (2010–2025); KKFS (2025)
- Call sign meaning: Sacramento Air 1

Technical information
- Licensing authority: FCC
- Facility ID: 70676
- Class: A
- ERP: 3,300 watts
- HAAT: 137 meters (449 ft)
- Transmitter coordinates: 38°38′53″N 121°05′51″W
- Translators: 95.1 K236BQ (Carmichael); 98.9 K255CN (Auburn); 98.9 K255CL (Clarksville)

Links
- Public license information: Public file; LMS
- Webcast: Listen live; HD2: Listen live
- Website: www.air1.com

KSAI (99.5 MHz) is a non-commercial, listener-supported FM radio station licensed to Citrus Heights, California, and serving the Sacramento metropolitan area. It broadcasts a Christian contemporary worship music format from the national network "Air1." It is owned and operated by the Educational Media Foundation, based in Franklin, Tennessee.

KSAI has an effective radiated power (ERP) of 3,300 watts. The station's transmitter is off Iron Point Road in Folsom. KSAI broadcasts using HD Radio technology. Its HD2 subchannel carries EMF's "K-Love Eras" network.

== History ==
This station signed on the air in September 1997. Its call sign was KLVS and it was located in Grass Valley, California, broadcasting at 99.3 MHz. It was a rebroadcaster of KLVR-FM Santa Rosa, as a "K-Love" station playing its format of Christian contemporary music. The construction permit for the station was issued in the early 1990s but it had trouble getting built until the permit was acquired by the Educational Media Foundation, then based in Northern California.

EMF re-launched the station on April 15, 2008. The transmitter was relocated from Grass Valley to El Dorado Hills, but using Citrus Heights as its new city of license. The frequency changed from 99.3 to its current 99.5. EMF wanted it to cover the larger Sacramento radio market.

On May 28, it went silent after the Federal Aviation Administration (FAA) voiced concern over the new 358-foot (109 m) radio tower. Although the antenna had all the necessary approvals from the Federal Communications Commission (FCC), the FAA said those approvals should not have been given without its input. EMF later worked out the technical issues and returned the station, by then KLVB, to the air in July 2012.

On February 1, 2025, due to the sale of KKFS (103.9 FM) to EMF and the end of its "103.9 The Fish" format, KLVB and KKFS exchanged call letters. KKFS 103.9 became KLVB, airing the K-Love network. KLVB 99.5 became KKFS, an affiliate of the Air1 network. On April 22, 2025, the call sign was changed to KSAI. Those call letters represent the words Sacramento Air 1 (with a capital I replacing the number 1).
