= KHTK =

- Sacramento, California; United States
- Broadcast area: Sacramento metro area
- Frequency: 1140 kHz
- Branding: Sactown Sports 1140

Programming
- Language: English
- Format: Sports
- Network: Westwood One Sports
- Affiliations: San Francisco 49ers; Las Vegas Raiders; San Jose Sharks; Sacramento Republic FC; UC Davis Aggies

Ownership
- Owner: Bonneville International; (Bonneville International Corporation)
- Sister stations: KNCI; KYMX; KZZO

History
- First air date: November 12, 1926 (as KGDM at 1380)
- Former call signs: KGDM (1926–57); KRAK (1957–94)
- Former frequencies: 1380 kHz (1926–28); 1150 kHz (1928–29); 1100 kHz (1929–41); 1130 kHz (1941–43)
- Call sign meaning: Station formerly had a hot talk format

Technical information
- Licensing authority: FCC
- Facility ID: 20352
- Class: B
- Power: 50,000 watts
- Transmitter coordinates: 38°23′33.7″N 121°11′54.8″W
- Repeater: 96.1 KYMX-HD2 (Sacramento)

Links
- Public license information: Public file; LMS
- Webcast: Listen live; Listen live (via Audacy)
- Website: www.sactownsports.com

KHTK (1140 AM) is a commercial radio station licensed to Sacramento, California. KHTK broadcasts a sports radio format as "Sactown Sports 1140" and is an affiliate of the Infinity Sports Network. It is owned by Salt Lake City–based Bonneville International, a profit-making subsidiary of the Church of Jesus Christ of Latter-day Saints. The studios and offices are on Commerce Circle in North Sacramento, just north of the American River.

KHTK is powered at 50,000 watts, the maximum for AM radio stations in the United States. Because AM 1140 is a clear channel frequency reserved for Class A stations XEMR-AM in Monterrey, Mexico, and WRVA in Richmond, Virginia, KHTK must broadcast with a directional antenna at all times to avoid interference, using a five-tower array. The transmitter is on Rising Road in Wilton, California.

KHTK is the second Sacramento AM station, after KIID, to broadcast using the HD Radio hybrid format. The signal is audible as far north as Redding, as far south as Monterey and into the suburbs of San Francisco. It is also simulcast on the third HD subchannel of sister station KNCI.

== Programming lineup ==
Weekdays begin with "The Carmichael Dave Show with Jason Ross" in morning drive time. In middays, Allen Stiles and Chris Watkins are heard. KHTK's afternoon drive show, The Drive Guys, features Kevin Gleason and Kyle Draper. At night and weekends, when there is no live game scheduled, KHTK carries Westwood One Sports shows.

KHTK serves as flagship station for UC Davis Aggies football. Also heard are Las Vegas Raiders and San Francisco 49ers football and San Jose Sharks hockey.

== History ==
=== Early years ===
KHTK first signed on the air on November 12, 1926. It was randomly assigned the call sign KGDM from an alphabetic list of available call letters. The station was originally owned by Hercules Broadcasting, licensed to Stockton, California, and operating at 1130 kHz with 1,000 watts of power. Initially it was a daytimer, required to go off the air from sunset to sunrise.

Following the establishment of the Federal Radio Commission (FRC), stations were initially issued a series of temporary authorizations starting on May 3, 1927. In addition, they were informed that if they wanted to continue operating, they needed to file a formal license application by January 15, 1928, as the first step in determining whether they met the new "public interest, convenience, or necessity" standard. On May 25, 1928, the FRC issued General Order 32, which notified 164 stations, including KGDM, that "From an examination of your application for future license it does not find that public interest, convenience, or necessity would be served by granting it." However, the station successfully convinced the commission that it should remain licensed.

On November 11, 1928, the FRC implemented a major reallocation of station transmitting frequencies, as part of a reorganization resulting from its implementation of General Order 40. KGDM was assigned to 1150 kHz, and restricted to only daytime operation.

The 1941 North American Regional Broadcasting Agreement required the station to move its frequency. KGDM switched to 1140 kHz with 5,000 watts, now authorized to broadcast full-time. In 1957, the station changed call signs to KRAK, increased power to 50,000 watts and flipped to a Top 40 format. The station unsuccessfully competed with KSTN in Stockton, which at that time only ran 1,000 watts. KSTN would continue with Top 40 (later called contemporary hit radio) until 1999 though by the late 1980s had a rhythmic/urban slant to the format.

=== Country KRAK ===
KRAK flipped to a country music format in 1962. The station had changed its city of license to Sacramento and moved to new facilities. Some of the early personalities included "Oakie Paul" Westmoreland, Walt Shaw, and Dick Bains. With country music moving more into mainstream popularity during the 1970s, KRAK became one of the Sacramento area's most popular stations. Listeners were not only exposed to artists such as Johnny Cash, Dolly Parton, Waylon Jennings, and Willie Nelson, but enjoyed two decades of on-air personality stability. Joey Mitchell hosted the morning show, and was named "Sacramento Radio Personality of the Year" several times. Rick Stewart hosted middays, Big Jim Hall hosted afternoon drive, Hal Murray hosted nights, and Fred Hoffman hosted "Captain Fred's All-Night Truckin' Show." All had Top 40 backgrounds which led to a tighter, more upbeat format.

KRAK continued to broadcast into the 1990s, long after other music stations had switched to the FM band. KRAK-FM would eventually move ahead in the ratings, later becoming KNCI through changes after a purchase by CBS Radio and frequency switching.

=== Talk and sports ===
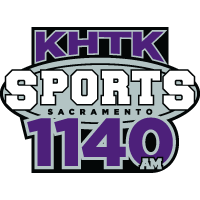
Logo as "Sports 1140"

On February 28, 1994, KRAK became KHTK, a hot talk station, as "Hot Talk 1140". After a couple of years in the talk format, it flipped to its current all-sports format. The call letters "KRAK" would make a brief return in the Sacramento media market as a classic country station at AM 1470 before that station was sold to Radio Disney and is today KIID, airing programming in Punjabi. Most recently, the KRAK call letters were assigned to a CBS-owned station in Victor Valley, California, which would later become KMPS.

KHTK was originally branded as "Sports 1140" before adopting "The Fan" branding in November 2011. On January 1, 2013, KHTK began to identify itself as "CBS Sports 1140". On July 1, 2013, six months after identifying as "CBS Sports 1140", KHTK switched its branding back to "KHTK Sports 1140", then to "Sports 1140 KHTK". One of KHTK's initial sports hosts was Pro Football Hall of Famer Jack Youngblood, who co-hosted with Mike Remy, the station's former program director.

=== Ownership changes ===
On July 31, 2008, the CBS Corporation announced that KHTK and its five sister stations in Sacramento were being put up for sale as part of the planned divestiture of radio stations outside the top-15 U.S. radio markets. KHTK would remain part of the CBS Radio family for nearly a decade.

On February 2, 2017, CBS Radio announced it would merge with Entercom, which locally owned KKDO, KUDL, KSEG, KRXQ, and KIFM. The company formerly owned KDND until it shut the station down and turned in its license to the Federal Communications Commission two days later. On October 10, CBS Radio announced that as part of the process of obtaining regulatory approval of the merger, KHTK would be one of sixteen stations that would be divested by Entercom, along with sister stations KYMX, KZZO, and KNCI; KSFM would be retained by Entercom.

On November 1, Entercom announced that Bonneville International would begin operating KHTK, KYMX, KZZO and KNCI via a local marketing agreement (LMA) when the merger of CBS and Entercom closed on November 17, while their licenses were placed into a divestiture trust pending a sale to a different owner within 180 days. On August 3, 2018, Bonneville announced it would buy the stations outright in a $141 million deal. The sale was completed on September 21, 2018.

=== Controversy ===
Former KHTK afternoon host and Kings play-by-play announcer Grant Napear was a staple of the station's programming from 1997 until 2020. In June 2020, Bonneville fired Napear for insensitive remarks towards former Kings player DeMarcus Cousins in a series of Twitter feeds regarding the Black Lives Matter movement.

=== Sactown Sports ===
On June 20, 2022, KHTK rebranded as "Sactown Sports 1140". The station acquired local broadcast rights to the San Francisco 49ers in March 2023, replacing former affiliate KIFM.

KHTK served as the Sacramento affiliate of Oakland Athletics baseball via the Oakland Athletics Radio Network from 2013 through 2024. Following the temporary move of the Athletics (A's) to West Sacramento as part of their relocation to Las Vegas, on February 14, 2025, the team announced that KSTE would replace KHTK as the team's Sacramento radio outlet.

=== Sacramento Kings Flagship ===
KHTK served as the flagship station for the Sacramento Kings for 32 years. In 2026, the team announced it was taking its broadcast rights in-house. Games would no longer be heard on local radio but will continue to be streamed and heard on SiriusXM.
