= KYMX =

Radio station in Sacramento, California

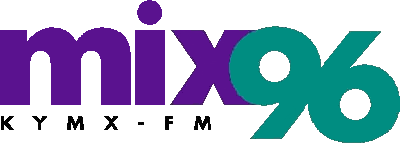
- Sacramento, California; United States
- Broadcast area: Sacramento metro area
- Frequency: 96.1 MHz (HD Radio)
- Branding: Mix 96

Programming
- Language: English
- Format: Adult contemporary
- Subchannels: HD2: Bilingual Soft AC ("Amor Sacramento"); HD3: Sports radio (KHTK "Sactown Sports")

Ownership
- Owner: Bonneville International; (Bonneville International Corporation)
- Sister stations: KHTK; KNCI; KZZO

History
- First air date: March 1947 (as KCRA-FM)
- Former call signs: KCRA-FM (1947–1968); KCTC (1968–1990)
- Call sign meaning: "Your Mix"

Technical information
- Licensing authority: FCC
- Facility ID: 72116
- Class: B
- ERP: 50,000 watts
- HAAT: 145 meters (476 ft)
- Transmitter coordinates: 38.636°N 121.554°W

Links
- Public license information: Public file; LMS
- Webcast: Listen live; Listen live (via Audacy)
- Website: www.mix96sac.com

KYMX (96.1 FM, "Mix 96") is a commercial radio station that is licensed to Sacramento, California, United States. The station is owned by Salt Lake City–based Bonneville International and broadcasts an adult contemporary format. KYMX's transmitter is located in Natomas and its studios are in North Sacramento.

KYMX broadcasts in HD Radio.

== History ==
=== Early years: 1947-1968 ===
The station first signed on in March 1947 as KCRA-FM, when its founder Central Valleys Broadcasting Co. received a Federal Communications Commission (FCC) construction permit for a new class B FM station in Sacramento at 96.1 MHz. This new station was the FM adjunct to KCRA (1320 AM), which Central Valleys Broadcasting had launched two years earlier.

=== Beautiful music: 1968-1990 ===
In September 1968, KCRA-FM changed its call sign to KCTC and adopted a beautiful music format known as "California Sound".

=== Adult contemporary: 1990-present ===
On February 1, 1990, KCTC flipped to adult contemporary as KYMX, "Mix 96". The KCTC call letters and beautiful music format, in turn, moved to 1320 AM (now KIFM), replacing adult standards on that frequency.

On February 2, 2017, CBS Radio announced it would merge with Entercom (which locally owned KIFM, KKDO, KRXQ, KSEG, and KUDL; the company formerly owned KDND until it shut the station down and turned in its license to the FCC two days later). On October 10, CBS Radio announced that as part of the process of obtaining regulatory approval of the merger, KYMX would be one of sixteen stations that would be divested by Entercom, along with sister stations KHTK, KNCI, and KZZO (KSFM would be retained by Entercom).

Upon closure of the merger on November 17, 2017, Bonneville International began operating KYMX, KHTK, KNCI, and KZZO, as well as four other stations in San Francisco, under a local marketing agreement on behalf of the Entercom Divestiture Trust. In August 2018, Bonneville announced that it would acquire all eight stations outright for $141 million. The sale was completed on September 21, 2018.

== HD Radio ==
KYMX has three HD Radio digital subchannels:

- KYMX-HD1 is a digital simulcast of the analog FM signal.
- KYMX-HD2 airs a bilingual soft adult contemporary format branded as "Amor Sacramento".
- KYMX-HD3 airs a sports radio format as a simulcast of KHTK ("Sactown Sports 1140 AM"). The simulcast was moved from the HD2 subchannel after the launch of "Amor Sacramento".
