= KZZO =

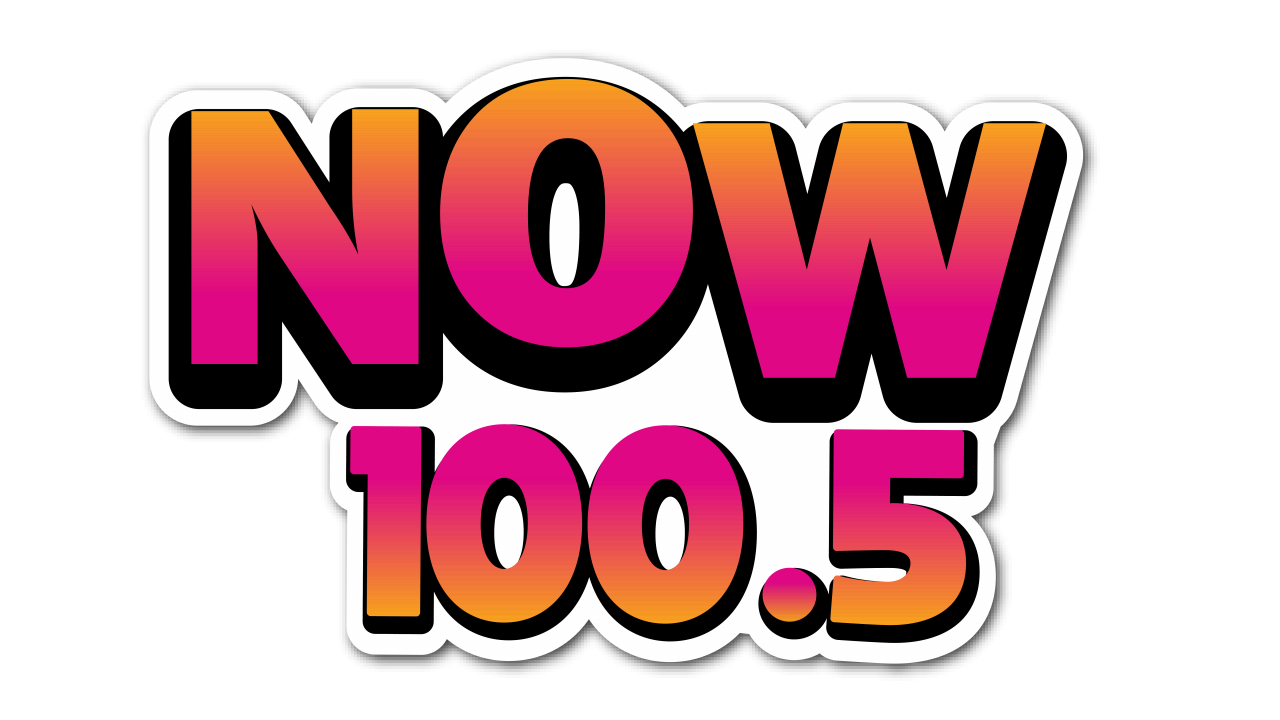
- Sacramento, California; United States
- Broadcast area: Sacramento metro area
- Frequency: 100.5 MHz (HD Radio)
- Branding: Now 100.5

Programming
- Language: English
- Format: Adult CHR
- Subchannels: HD2: Dance/EDM "Energy 100.5 HD2"
- Affiliations: Premiere Networks

Ownership
- Owner: Bonneville International; (Bonneville International Corporation)
- Sister stations: KHTK; KNCI; KYMX

History
- First air date: October 1958 (as KEBR)
- Former call signs: KEBR (1958-88); KQPT (1988-97)
- Call sign meaning: KZ ZOne (previous branding)

Technical information
- Licensing authority: FCC
- Facility ID: 65481
- Class: B
- ERP: 115,000 watts
- HAAT: 100 meters (330 ft)
- Transmitter coordinates: 38.642°N 121.091°W

Links
- Public license information: Public file; LMS
- Webcast: Listen live Listen live (via Audacy); Listen live (HD2)
- Website: now100fm.com

KZZO (100.5 MHz "Now 100.5") is a commercial FM radio station licensed to Sacramento, California. It broadcasts an Adult Top 40 radio format and is owned by Salt Lake City–based Bonneville International, a profit-making subsidiary of the Church of Jesus Christ of Latter-day Saints. KZZO's studios and offices are on Commerce Circle in Sacramento near the American River and the North Sacramento Freeway (California State Route 160). KZZO is one of four stations operated by Bonneville in the Sacramento radio market, along with FM stations KNCI and KYMX plus AM station KHTK.

KZZO has an effective radiated power (ERP) of 115,000 watts, grandfathered at an unusually high power. The transmitter is on Alder Creek Parkway in Folsom, near U.S. Route 50. KZZO broadcasts in the HD Radio hybrid format, with its HD2 digital subchannel carrying an Dance/EDM format. The station carries the Brooke & Jeffrey morning drive time show, syndicated by Premiere Networks from KQMV Seattle.

== History ==
=== Religious: 1958-1988 ===
The station signed on the air in October 1958 as KEBR, a Christian radio station owned by Family Radio, an Oakland based organization. After a three decades of broadcasting religious music and bible talks from radio evangelist Harold Camping, Family Radio sold 100.5 to commercial owners in 1988, with Family Radio eventually relocating to KEBR (1210 AM) in Rocklin, (now South Asian station KRPU), and FM 88.1, which now carries the KEBR call letters.

=== Smooth jazz: 1988-1995 ===
The new owners installed a Smooth Jazz format on April 16, 1988, re-branded it as The Point and changed its call sign to KQPT. Over a seven-year period, The Point went through a couple of ownership changes and format tweaks (mostly towards album rock).

=== Adult alternative: 1995-1996 ===
Brown Broadcasting changed the branding to "The Zone" in September 1995 and the format to a wide-ranging AAA mix it promoted as "bands you've never heard of." Brown sold KQPT, KXOA (AM) and KXOA-FM to American Radio Systems in 1996. The call letters were switched to KZZO in 1997. There was a three-way battle for rock listeners during this period between KWOD, KRXQ (93 Rock) and "The Zone."

=== Hot/modern adult contemporary: 1996-2010 ===
However, after a year as a AAA, KZZO began evolving to hot adult contemporary, later moving to modern adult contemporary (after the shift of KGBY to the former format in 2007).

=== Adult top 40: 2010-present ===
KZZO remained in that format until June 22, 2010, when it shifted to a broader Adult Top 40 direction and adopted the "Now" approach. KZZO was the first Adult Top 40 station in the CBS Radio stable to use the slogan, as "Now" is more associated with a Rhythmic pop-leaning Top 40/CHR brand; unlike other "Now" stations, KZZO, due being an Adult Top 40 and having Rhythmic Top 40 KSFM as a sister station (at the time), will not play any hip hop songs, although it does share some artists (i.e. Kesha and Lady Gaga) at both stations. In addition, KZZO has vowed not to play any gold or recurrent songs from the 80s or 90s, a message aimed directly at rival KGBY, whose playlist featured a more conventional hot AC approach. Later that year, the “Now” branding was brought onto WPBZ in West Palm Beach, Florida, a hot AC station owned by CBS Radio (this station would later flip to Sports, as WAXY-FM was sold by CBS and relocated into the Miami market).

By December 2011, KZZO became the only hot adult contemporary radio station in Sacramento due to Clear Channel changing KGBY to news-talk as KFBK-FM, simulcasting KFBK. However, the following week, KZZO no gained a competitor in KBZC, which flipped from rhythmic adult contemporary to hot AC; the competition would last until February 2017, when the station (now known as KUDL) flipped to Top 40, leaving KZZO as Sacramento's only hot AC station again.

On February 2, 2017, CBS Radio announced it would merge with Entercom (which locally owned KKDO, KUDL, KSEG, KRXQ, and KIFM; the company formerly owned KDND until it shut the station down and turned in its license to the Federal Communications Commission two days later). On October 10, CBS Radio announced that as part of the process of obtaining regulatory approval of the merger, KZZO would be one of sixteen stations that would be divested by Entercom, along with sister stations KYMX, KNCI, and KHTK (KSFM would be retained by Entercom). Bonneville International began operating KZZO, KYMX, KNCI and KHTK, as well as four other stations in San Francisco, under a local marketing agreement upon the closure of the merger on November 17, 2017, on behalf of the Entercom Divestiture Trust.

On August 3, 2018, Bonneville subsequently announced its intent to acquire all eight stations outright for $141 million. The sale was completed on September 21, 2018.

Since the ownership change, KZZO has shortened its slogan to “Today’s Best Hits” (dropping the phrase “Without The Rap”) and shifted its direction towards a Mainstream Top 40 playlist to counter Audacy-owned KUDL while still maintaining its Adult Top 40 format.

== Outlaw scandal ==
In April 2008, The Zone began a contest in which a listener would be required to correctly identify an individual as "The 100.5 The Zone $25,000 Outlaw" in order to receive a monetary prize of $25,000 cash. This was a variation of the popular radio promotion called "The $10,000 Fugitive" done on numerous stations across the country such as WBLI in Long Island.

The Zone originally posted contest rules which stated that the prize was a share certificate valued at $3,400 from the Sacramento Credit Union, that matured to the total reward value of $25,000 after 10 years. This was only temporary rules set in place while the credit union gathered the funds for the entire $25,000 cash. Only if the "Outlaw" was caught in the first few days would these rules be put into place. By the 2nd week of the promotion, the entire $25,000 cash was value of the prize, and the rules reflected that change.

On April 14, 2008, the morning show of rival radio station KDND began to advertise on their station that they were going to give away the location of the $25,000. KDND, owned by Entercom, not CBS like The Zone, used a full day worth of advertising promoting a contest on another radio station. The following morning, April 15, KDND's morning show spent the entire 7:00am hour reading the then-expired contest rules on the air. The reasons for doing this were not completely clear.

The outlaw was "caught" outside of the Nugget Market in Rocklin, California on April 29, 2008 at noon. The winner was greeted by Zone Staff with the letter from Sacramento Credit Union redeemable for $25,000. The video can be seen on YouTube.

== High Power Transmitter ==
KZZO has an effective radiated power (ERP) of 115,000 watts. It is grandfathered at a much higher power than other FM stations in Sacramento, which are limited these days to 50,000 watts. On the other hand, its height above average terrain (HAAT) is 100 meters (330 ft), using a tower not as tall as most Sacramento FM outlets. So its signal covers a larger region of Northern California than the others, but not by a dramatic margin. KZZO's signal can be easily heard as far north as Yuba City, as far south as Lodi and Stockton and as far west as Vacaville. Under tropo conditions, it is occasionally picked up in the San Francisco Bay Area.
