= KNCI =

Country music radio station in Sacramento, California

- Sacramento, California; United States
- Broadcast area: Sacramento metro area
- Frequency: 105.1 MHz (HD Radio)
- Branding: New Country 105-1

Programming
- Language: English
- Format: Country
- Subchannels: HD1: KNCI analog HD2: The Wolf (Young country); HD3: The Ranch (Classic country)

Ownership
- Owner: Bonneville International; (Bonneville International Corporation)
- Sister stations: KHTK; KYMX; KZZO

History
- First air date: February 21, 1960 (as KHIQ)
- Former call signs: KHIQ (1960–73); KEWT (1973–84); KSKK (1984–85; KRAK-FM (1985–94)
- Call sign meaning: Nationwide Communications, Inc. (former owners)

Technical information
- Licensing authority: FCC
- Facility ID: 20353
- Class: B
- ERP: 50,000 watts
- HAAT: 152 meters (499 ft)
- Transmitter coordinates: 38.642°N 121.091°W

Links
- Public license information: Public file; LMS
- Webcast: Listen live Listen live (via Audacy); HD2: Listen live HD3: Listen live
- Website: kncifm.com

KNCI (105.1 FM, "New Country 105-1") is a commercial radio station in Sacramento, California, United States. The station is owned by Salt Lake City–based Bonneville International. KNCI carries a country music format, alongside a classic country format known as The Ranch and a "Young Country" format known as "The Wolf" on HD Radio subchannels.

Its transmitter is in the hills above Folsom, and its studios are in North Sacramento (just north of the American River).

== History ==
=== Beautiful music: 1960-1984 ===
105.1 FM signed on the air on February 21, 1960 as KHIQ. In the 1970s and early 1980s, that station had a "beautiful music" format and the call letters were KEWT. It was automated using the Cart-O-Matic system, popular in the late 1970s.

=== Country: 1984-present ===
The then rival KAER 92.5 Country music station was the only FM station competing with the AM giant KRAK featuring DJs Joey Mitchell, Racin' Rick Stewart and Big Jim Hall. Management decided to give KAER a challenge and try the Country Market with KEWT, changing the call letters to KSKK. It was a huge success. After a short while, KAER dumped the country format and started playing Adult Contemporary, which turned out to be a successful venture for them. Later, KSKK became KRAK-FM. In February 1994, KRAK and rival KNCI swapped frequencies.

Previous logo until 2011.

On February 2, 2017, CBS Radio announced it would merge with Entercom (which locally owned KKDO, KUDL, KSEG, KRXQ, and KIFM; the company formerly owned KDND until it shut the station down and turned in its license to the Federal Communications Commission two days later). The merger was completed November 17, 2017. To comply with ownership limits, KNCI, KHTK, KZZO, and KYMX, as well as four stations in San Francisco, were divested to the Entercom Divestiture Trust pending their sale to a third-party, with Bonneville International assuming operations under a local marketing agreement. In August 2018, Bonneville subsequently announced its intent to acquire the eight divested stations outright for $141 million; the sale was completed on September 21, 2018.

== HD channels ==
KNCI's HD2 channel, called "The Wolf" features a "Young Country" format, playing the newest country songs from mainstream country artists as well as "up-and-coming" ones. It is commercial-free and due to the "Wolf" branding, by actively using this branding, it prevented former competitor KNTY from re-launching a new country format on any signal using "The Wolf" or "Young Country" branding. KNCI's HD3 channel, known as "The Ranch," features classic country hits. Previously, "The Ranch" was on KNCI's HD2 channel, and the HD3 channel was a simulcast of sports AM station KHTK. The simulcast of KHTK-AM is now on KYMX's HD subchannel at 96.1FM HD2.

== Awards ==
In 2020, KNCI won the Country Music Association's Award for "Large Market Station of the Year." It was runner-up for 2020 Academy of Country Music Award for the same category.
