= KSFM =

Radio station in Woodland, California, United States

- Woodland, California; United States
- Broadcast area: Sacramento metropolitan area
- Frequency: 102.5 MHz (HD Radio)
- Branding: 102-5 KSFM

Programming
- Language: English
- Format: Urban contemporary

Ownership
- Owner: Audacy, Inc.; (Audacy License, LLC)
- Sister stations: KIFM; KKDO; KRXQ; KSEG; KUDL

History
- First air date: February 4, 1961
- Former call signs: KATT (1961–68); KRBT (1970–74)
- Call sign meaning: "Sacramento's Favorite Music"

Technical information
- Licensing authority: FCC
- Facility ID: 59598
- Class: B
- ERP: 50,000 watts
- HAAT: 152 meters (499 ft)
- Transmitter coordinates: 38.589°N 121.726°W

Links
- Public license information: Public file; LMS
- Webcast: Listen live (via Audacy)
- Website: www.audacy.com/ksfm

KSFM (102.5 FM) is a commercial radio station that is licensed to Woodland, California, United States, and serves the Sacramento metropolitan area. The station is owned by Audacy, Inc. and broadcasts an urban contemporary format. KSFM's studios and offices are located on Lava Ridge Court in Roseville, and its transmitter is in Woodland.

From 2006 to 2010, KSFM's slogan was "Sacramento's New #1 Station for Hip-Hop and R&B". CBS billed KSFM as a rhythmic top 40 station due to its multicultural listenership. In 2010, the station changed its slogan to simply "102-5" with a broader mix of hip-hop, R&B, and rhythmic pop music. In August 2023, KSFM returned to a more urban-leaning rhythmic format with expanding their R&B playlist, increasing regional music from nearby Bay Area and Sacramento artists, drastically reducing pop music from their regular playlist and adding more urban throwbacks. Their current slogan is "Sacramento’s New #1 for Hip-Hop and R&B."

KSFM broadcasts in HD Radio.

== History ==
=== MOR: 1961-1968 ===
On February 4, 1961, the station at 102.5 FM signed on as KATT, branded "The Tiger Tail". The station aired a middle of the road (MOR) format and was owned by the Interstate Broadcasting Company, but by 1968, KATT went silent.

=== Top 40: 1970–1972 ===
In 1970, the station returned to the air as KRBT (Robot 10–25), a contemporary hit radio (CHR) outlet. It started out with live disc jockeys, but became automated shortly thereafter. On August 31, 1971, the station's owners, Tiger Broadcasting, sold the operation to KULA Broadcasting for $94,000.

=== Easy listening: 1972–1974 ===
KULA Broadcasting, owner of KGMS (1380 AM), took control of the station on April 1, 1972, and switched the format to easy listening. Remaining an automated operation, KRBT adopted new call letters KSFM that June. (Previously, the KSFM call letters were assigned to a station in Sacramento at 96.9 FM, but that station was sold to the owners of Pacific Southwest Airlines and renamed as KPSC.)

=== Progressive rock: 1974-1979 ===
In early 1974, KULA Broadcasting searched for a new programmer and new format for KSFM after upgrading the station's transmitter and improving its signal to cover the Sacramento radio market from suburban Woodland. The owners hired Don Wright, formerly of KZAP, KXOA/KNDE, and KRBT. His plan was to flip the station to progressive rock, a format that was slightly more structured than the freeform format of KZAP. The air talent would have a mid-tempo delivery style (neither fast and screaming nor completely laid back). The station kept the KSFM call letters but used the moniker "Earth Rock 102 KSFM".

On April 15, 1974, "Earth Rock 102" made its debut. Drake-Chenault, owners of KXOA-FM (107.9 FM), attempted to sue KSFM because KXOA-FM had recently (August 1972 through February 1973) used the "Earth Rock" name on the air. As a result, in July 1974, KSFM was rebranded as "Earth Radio 102". Within six months of its debut, "KSFM Earth Radio 102" reached number six in the Sacramento ratings. When the station management only delivered a $25 monthly pay raise, much of the air staff left to run KSJO in San Jose, where they installed the Earth Rock format. Nonetheless, KSFM continued to obtain positive ratings.

The format featured both well-established and up-and-coming rock artists. While the station would play popular rock acts, the announcers often focused on their deeper album cuts. Additionally, the music flow was diverse enough that one could hear a searing Led Zeppelin track and a folksy Joni Mitchell song in the same set, yet the music would flow naturally. The air talent programmed much of the music without the use of a set playlist. While a listener could hear an occasional country record by Jerry Jeff Walker or a reggae tune by Peter Tosh, they knew it would be followed by a rock record along with song information from the knowledgeable air talent. KSFM's format was dayparted: listeners would be treated to a softer rock sound in the daytime and hard rock at night. With Earth Radio 102's limited song repetition, listeners were often surprised by what would play next.

Earth Radio had several additional programming features that contributed to its unique sound. KSFM ran a news block each weekday morning from 9:20 a.m. to 10:00 a.m. known as "Earth News". The alternative news program included nationally syndicated interviews with rock stars of the day, as well as odd information that would interest the station's audience. Also on weekdays at 9:40 a.m., 1:40 p.m., and 6:40 p.m., the station announced upcoming concerts in both local and regional venues. Some evenings, the station would play an entire album from start to finish; starting out as a weekly feature, it was expanded to three nights a week. Between record sides, announcer Dave Whittaker would play an "Instrumental Interlude", a track from a completely different artist without vocals.

In late 1976, the station hired Dennis Newhall as an on-air staff announcer. He had previous experience with KZAP and KSJO. Subsequently, he was promoted to program director in 1977.

Earth Radio 102's success continued until mid-1979. In January 1979, KZAP's new owners installed radio consultant Lee Abrams' "Superstars" format on the formerly freeform station. KZAP's new format was rock-oriented, stressing the biggest selling artists. The change brought KZAP stellar ratings at the expense of Earth Radio. In the Spring 1979 Arbitron ratings, KSFM went from a 4.7 share to 3.1. Initially, there were rumors of KSFM either becoming more mainstream or switching to a country music format.

=== Top 40 / Disco: 1979-1998 ===
In August 1979, KSFM announced it would be switching to a more "mass appeal" music format the following month. On August 20, the Sacramento Union featured an article on the format switch. The entire air staff would be replaced. KSFM management hired radio consultant Jerry Clifton to initiate the new format. In the Union article, Clifton described the "Earth Radio" format as "esoteric ... similar to a jazz station". KSFM broadcast its last full day of progressive rock on September 9, 1979. The following day, September 10, the station began a five-day stunting period by playing music from a well-known artist each day. The first day consisted of all-Led Zeppelin music, while the second day featured the Beatles. By the fifth day, the station was playing Donna Summer and the Bee Gees as featured artists. On September 14, 1979, KSFM flipped to a hybrid top 40/disco format with the branding "FM102".

Under the leadership of incoming programming director Jeff Lucifer, and based on the recommendations of Clifton, KSFM began to gradually work its way up in the ratings with its dance-friendly "churban" (a mix of contemporary hits and urban) format. Clifton would later apply this formula to other stations like KGGI in Riverside, California, WJMH in Greensboro, North Carolina, and WPOW in Miami (the last two both sister stations to KSFM). By June 1983, KSFM evolved all the way to its current rhythmic contemporary direction under the guidance of program director Rick Gillette and music director Chris Collins, the latter who also hosted The FM102 Morning Zoo and later succeeded Gillette as operating manager and PD. The move occurred after KPOP, the Sacramento market's only urban contemporary outlet at the time, flipped formats to modern rock. Gillette and Collins realized that dance music, popular in the clubs and the streets, did not receive any airplay in the area. KSFM took advantage of this opportunity, leading the station to several number one Arbitron rankings in the market under their guidance, eventually beating the more-mainstream top 40 stations.

In July 1987, KSFM owner Duffy Broadcasting Corp. sold all but one of its stations to Genesis Broadcasting Company, a new entity owned in part by Duffy executives, for $74 million.

KSFM faced a series of legal issues in the early 1990s. In 1990, KWOD owner Ed Stolz filed a libel lawsuit against Genesis Broadcasting for $10 million. According to the suit, on June 30, 1989, Collins disparaged KWOD on-air as being anti-gay and anti-African American; this resulted in lost advertisers, threats to station staff, and a drop in ratings. Collins, in turn, claimed his remarks were in response to anti-gay comments by KWOD morning host Pat Garrett. In late 1993, Collins sued Genesis Broadcasting for wrongful termination, seeking at least the approximate $335,000 value of the remaining two years of his contract. He alleged he was fired for threatening to report drug use in the workplace and associated abusive behavior by supervisors. Genesis responded that Collins was dismissed because of declining ratings. This dispute threatened to derail the pending merger of Genesis with Secret Communications. Royce International, then-owner of KWOD, petitioned the Federal Communications Commission (FCC) to investigate the drug use allegations, as well as resolve issues related to a previous petition involving Genesis' alleged interference in Royce's business activities. The merger ultimately was approved, finally closing on August 1, 1994.

In May 1996, Secret Communications sent KSFM and sister station KMJI (1380 AM) to American Radio Systems in a four-station swap worth $48.5 million, acquiring WQRS in Detroit and WFLN-FM in Philadelphia.

KSFM continued to lead the market as the top 40 station of choice in Sacramento until the arrivals of mainstream contemporary hit radio (CHR) outlet KDND (107.9 The End) and urban-formatted KBMB (103.5 The Bomb) in 1998. KSFM offered a current-based mix of rhythmic pop, R&B, and hip hop product in its playlist. Those ingredients placed KSFM between KDND, which offered listeners a broad-based playlist, and KBMB, which heavily emphasized hip hop.

=== Rhythmic Top 40: 1998-present ===
In 1998, KSFM was bought by Infinity Broadcasting Corporation, which had already been acquired by Westinghouse Broadcasting. Westinghouse merged with CBS Radio shortly thereafter. Under CBS Radio ownership, the KSFM lineup featured programming director Tony Tecate in mornings, Bre in middays, Short-E in afternoons, Nina in evenings and The Specialist overnights. Featured programs included Club 102 with The Specialist on Friday and Saturday nights.

Former logo

In January 2010, KSFM's Arbitron 12+ ratings stood at a 3.1 share—the lowest since the Spring 1979 report, when the station aired progressive rock. However, by April 2010, KSFM rebounded, although it achieved nowhere the record-breaking numbers from 1994 to 1997 when 11 and 12 shares under PD's Rick Thomas and Bob West were common. In the June 2012 Portable People Meter (PPM) report, KSFM's ratings rose enough to bring the station to fourth place in the Sacramento market. On June 1, 2010, KSFM relocated its studios from 1750 Howe Avenue to 280 Commerce Circle in Sacramento, home to the CBS Radio cluster there.

On February 2, 2017, CBS Radio announced it would merge with Entercom. Entercom also owns KKDO, KUDL, KSEG, KRXQ, and KIFM in the Sacramento market; the company also owned KDND until it shut down that station and surrendered its license to the FCC two days later. On October 10, 2017, Entercom announced that KSFM would be the only station in the CBS Radio Sacramento cluster that the company would retain following the merger. Entercom's decision to keep KSFM while spinning off the other former CBS stations was due to its rhythmic top 40 format, which would give the company another top 40 station to pair with KUDL and serve as flankers in the market following KDND's aforementioned shutdown, much like the strategy with future rock siblings KKDO, KSEG, and KRXQ. KHTK, KNCI, KYMX, and KZZO were divested into a blind trust with Bonneville International operating them under a local marketing agreement until they could find new owners. Bonneville purchased the stations outright in September 2018.

The CBS Radio—Entercom merger was approved on November 9, 2017, and was consummated on November 17. Upon the change of ownership, KSFM relocated to Entercom's studio building on Madison Avenue in Sacramento.

In May 2018, Entercom replaced the KSFM staff. Michael Buhrman, former on-air personality from sister station KQKS in Denver, took over as the new PD and afternoon host, with Mia Amor from KRBQ in San Francisco working mornings, Nina Hajian voice-tracking middays from WBBM-FM in Chicago, and SOOSH*E (who was let go from KHHM after Entravision made major job cuts) taking evenings. In January 2019, KSFM boasted a 100% local on-air staff again when Bianca V moved to middays; she previously had been a part of the KSFM street team and hosting the Club 102 mix show. The station also brought in DJ Elements and DJ Oasis to mix their Club 102 mix shows, along with DJ Squintz who hosts the overnight time-slot.

In July 2019, KSFM once again became the only rhythmic top 40 station in Sacramento following KHHM's flip to a bilingual top 40 format. Since that move, KSFM had seen a resurgence ratings wise, eventually leading sibling KUDL in the Nielsen Audio ratings to become the most-listened to top 40 station in Sacramento.

In June 2023, KSFM fired its entire on-air staff and began gradually transitioning away from their 13-year stretch of rhythmic pop and mainstream hip hop. This transition was followed up with the hire of Damien ‘D-Lo’ Barling and Kenny ‘KC’ Caraway. In August 2023, KSFM revived their 2000s era slogan, “Sacramento’s #1 for Hip-Hop and R&B”. The station has introduced more R&B into their format, cut rhythmic pop songs, inserted local artists like E-40, Too $hort, and others, and added throwbacks into their rotation with current music. As of December 2023, KSFM is the only radio station in the Sacramento market to have a heavy current Hip Hop and R&B rotation on their playlist.

== HD radio ==
KSFM broadcasts in the HD Radio format with two digital subchannels:

- KSFM-HD1 is a digital simulcast of the analog signal.
- KSFM-HD2 broadcasts an urban adult contemporary format known as "The Love Train".

The HD2 subchannel was launched in 2008 with a commercial-free dance top 40 format. From August 2017 to January 2018, KSFM-HD2 featured hip hop music.
