= KZAP =

KZAP may refer to:

- KRXQ, a radio station (98.5 FM) licensed to Sacramento, California, United States, which used the KZAP call sign and "K-ZAP" branding from 1968 to 1992
- KZAP (FM), a radio station (96.7 FM) licensed to Paradise, California, United States
- KZHP-LP, a low-power radio station (93.3 FM), using the "K-ZAP" branding, in Sacramento, California, United States
