= KEBR =

KEBR may refer to:

- KEBR (FM), a radio station (88.1 FM) licensed to serve Sacramento, California, United States
- KRPU, a radio station (1210 AM) licensed to serve Rocklin, California, which held the call sign KEBR from 1988 to 2015
- KQEI-FM, a radio station (89.3 FM) licensed to serve North Highlands, California, which held the call sign KEBR-FM from 1990 to 2003
- KZZO, a radio station (100.5 FM) licensed to serve Sacramento, California, which held the call sign KEBR until 1988
