= KBZC =

KBZC may refer to:

- KBZC-LD, a low-power television station (channel 20, virtual 42) licensed to serve Oklahoma City, Oklahoma, United States
- KUDL, a radio station (106.5 FM) licensed to serve Sacramento, California, United States, which held the call sign KBZC from 2009 to 2014
