= Grant Napear =

American radio personality (born 1959)

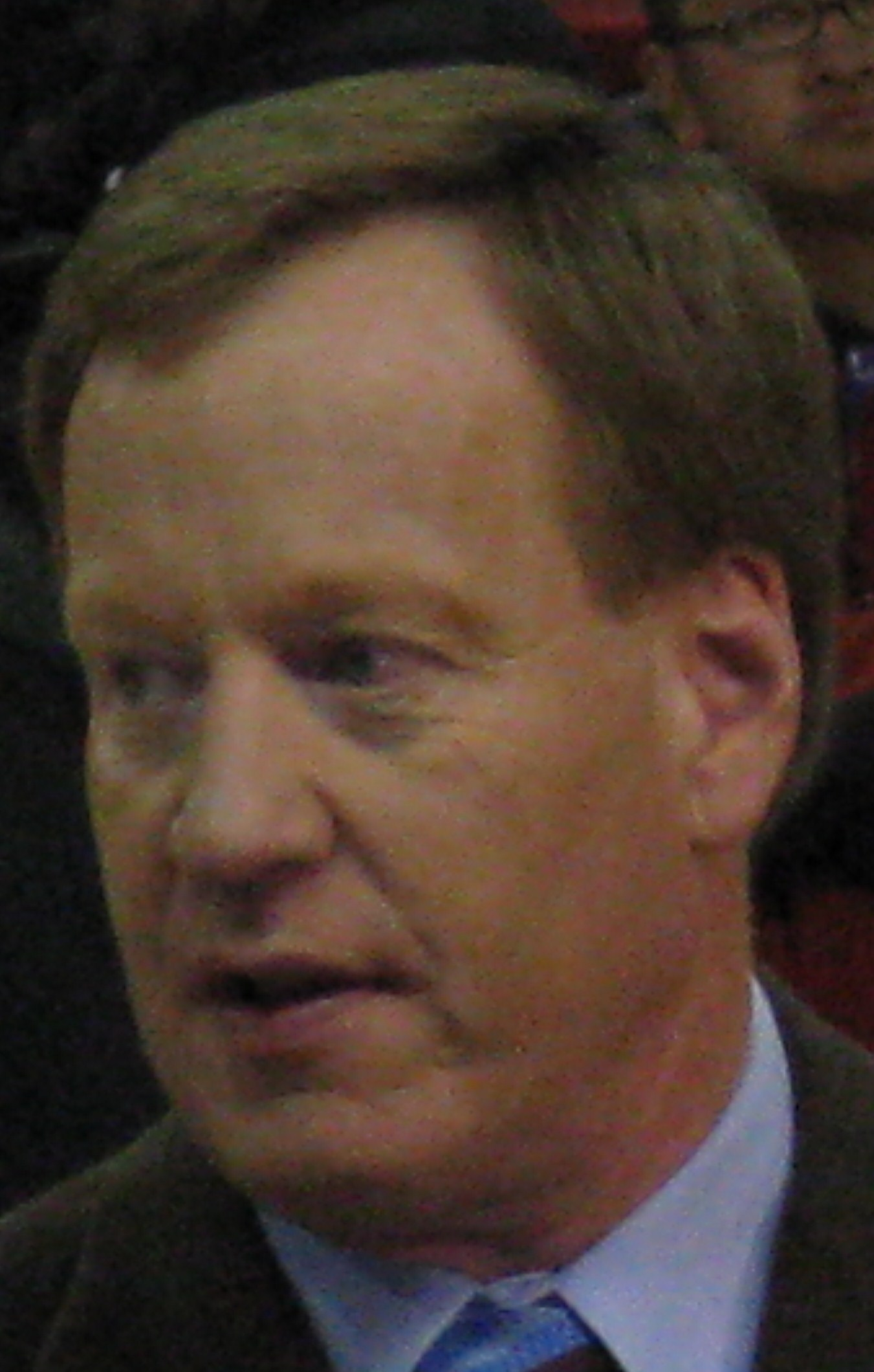
- Napear in 2010
- Born: Grant Harrington Napear
- Occupation: Sportscaster

Grant Harrington Napear is an American radio personality who currently hosts his own podcast If You Don't Like That With Grant Napear. Before this he hosted The Grant Napear Show at KHTK Sports 1140 in Sacramento, California where he was fired for tweeting "All lives matter, Every Single One" during the George Floyd protest. He was also the play-by-play announcer for the Sacramento Kings of the National Basketball Association (NBA) but resigned. He has been a guest host on The Jim Rome Show. His signature phrase is "If you don't like that, you don't like NBA basketball".

== Early life ==
Born in Syosset, New York, Napear graduated from Syosset High School in 1977 and earned his academic degree in broadcast journalism from Bowling Green University, where he also played lacrosse.

== Broadcasting history ==
- 1977–1981: Football, basketball and hockey play-by-play announcer for Bowling Green University
- 1985–1987: Weekend sports anchor, WAND, Decatur, IL
- 1987–1995: Sports director for KRBK-TV/KPWB (now KMAX-TV) Channel 31, Sacramento California
- 1988–2020: Sacramento Kings play-by-play television announcer
- 1992–1994: Play-by-play announcer for the Sacramento Gold Miners
- 1995–1998: Sacramento Kings play-by-play radio announcer (KHTK)
- 2000–2015: play-by-play announcer for the San Jose SaberCats
- 2003: Oakland Raiders preseason television announcer
- 2011–2012: Sacramento Mountain Lions play-by-play announcer
- 2020–present: If You Don't Like That With Grant Napear podcast
- 2025–present: Fox Sports 890/104.7” KSAC Afternoon Radio Host

== Views on race ==
Napear has been accused of racism by former players for the Sacramento Kings and has come under fire for defending Donald Sterling, the former owner of the Los Angeles Clippers banned from the NBA after making racist remarks.

On May 31, 2020, after the start of the George Floyd protests, Napear responded on Twitter to former Kings' player DeMarcus Cousins' question regarding Black Lives Matter with the phrase "All lives matter, Every Single One." The following day, Napear apologized, saying he was unaware that All Lives Matter "was counter to what BLM was trying to get across". He was placed on leave by KHTK. On June 2, the station announced that they had fired Napear then he announced he had resigned from his TV position with the Kings.
