= KUDL =

- Sacramento, California; United States
- Broadcast area: Sacramento metropolitan area
- Frequency: 106.5 MHz (HD Radio)
- Branding: 106.5 The End

Programming
- Language: English
- Format: Contemporary hit radio

Ownership
- Owner: Audacy, Inc.; (Audacy License, LLC)
- Sister stations: KIFM; KKDO; KRXQ; KSEG; KSFM

History
- First air date: April 1, 1957; 69 years ago
- Former call signs: KJML (1957–1977); KWOD (1977–2009); KBZC (2009–2014); KWOD (2014)
- Call sign meaning: "Parked" from the current KMBZ-FM in Kansas City

Technical information
- Licensing authority: FCC
- Facility ID: 57889
- Class: B
- ERP: 50,000 watts
- HAAT: 125 meters (410 ft)
- Transmitter coordinates: 38.642°N 121.091°W

Links
- Public license information: Public file; LMS
- Webcast: Listen live
- Website: www.audacy.com/endonline

KUDL (106.5 FM) is a radio station in Sacramento, California. Owned by Audacy, Inc., it broadcasts a Top 40 (CHR) format branded as 106-5 The End. Its studios are located in Roseville, California and its transmitter is in Folsom.

== History ==
=== Beautiful music: 1957-1967 ===
The 106.5 frequency in Sacramento signed on in 1957 with the call letters KJML, which adopted a number of format changes before settling with the beautiful music format, commonly identified as "instrumental elevator music."

=== Progressive rock: 1967-1977 ===
In 1967, KJML featured a brokered, block-programmed format. KJML featured the first "Underground/Progressive Rock" programming in Sacramento commercial radio. beginning in late 1967. Carey Nosler had a 9PM to Midnight shift each weekday evening from 9:00 PM until Midnight, where he played freeform Rock-based music on his "Fantasy Machine" program. Nosler continued with the program until he joined KZAP in November 1968, which became Sacramento's first full-time Progressive Rock station. Nosler continued at KZAP in various capacities until the mid-1970s, when he migrated to television and became a national advocate of natural foods, health and nutrition.

=== Soft rock/jazz: 1977-1979 ===
Royce International Broadcasting headed by Edward R. Stolz II acquired the station in 1977 and changed the format to a soft rock/jazz music hybrid with a change of call letters to KWOD, named after quadrophonic sound, as the station was one of the first to experiment with the technology that never caught on. The initial format was programmed by Kevin Childs, who created the method of transitioning from rock to jazz via what was called "The Crossroads of Jazz". With no advertising of promotion, KWOD succeeded in achieving a dedicated following across the Sacramento Valley.

=== Top 40: 1979-1993 ===
In the late 1970s, Royce Broadcasting decided to drop the adult contemporary/jazz hybrid music format in favor of a Top 40 music format. The station's signal was briefly downgraded by the FCC due to a transmission violation, but full power was restored in early 1984.

By 1985, KWOD was the second rated station in the 12+ age demographic under the programming of Program Director Tom Chase and Music Director "Mr. Ed" Lambert behind crosstown CHUrban powerhouse (and future sister station) KSFM. The popular morning show of this period was "The Masters and Johnson Morning Radio Clinic" featuring Doug Masters and Marty Johnson. Other jocks throughout the Tom Chase and Ed Lambert era included Dave Diamond, Dean Stevens, Dave Skyler, Greg Lane, Melanie Evans, John Edwards, Panama Jack, Ron Brooks, Ally Knight, Rick Foster, Russ Martin, Pat "The Night Hawk" Garrett and Alex Cosper. Tom left in late 1987 to program competitor KROY and Ed followed to become KROY's MD in early 1988.

In 1988, KWOD became "Power Hits KWOD 106", and its morning show became "The Tom Sterling and Terry Steele Morning Show" featuring Program Director Jeff Hunter (Terry Steele) and Charlie Simons (Tom Sterling). Following the resignation of Marty Johnson, Doug Masters moved to middays. The rest of the full-time line-up of this period included Johnny "Jammin'" Edwards in middays, Panama Jack in afternoons, Pat "The Night Hawk" Garrett in evenings, and Alex Cosper in late nights. Tom and Terry left in 1989 to do mornings in San Jose, and were replaced by a temporary irreverent show that failed called "The Renegades."

Gerry Cagle arrived in late 1989 to oversee programming as Operations Manager. Ratings fell sharply beginning in 1988 (as documented in the Sacramento Bee) as KWOD fell into third place in a three-way battle with cross-town competitors KSFM and KROY. Even after KROY changed to The Eagle as a classic rock station, the ratings remained dismal, which lead to a change of format in May 1991 to a Top 40/modern rock music hybrid, which evolved into a full-fledged modern rock music format by June 1993.

=== Alternative rock: 1993-2009 ===
In 1991 Gerry Cagle was instrumental in changing the CHR music format in favor of full-time modern rock. This is documented in multiple trade publications. Axl Marley and the late Dan Kennedy excelled in morning drive with the new Modern Rock format. Alex Cosper became program director in 1991 then head of programming following Cagle's departure in early 1993. In June the station shifted its format to a more rock-oriented presentation of alternative music. The ratings began to turn around quickly as KWOD moved from the bottom to the top five.

Part of the station's success was attributed to morning show Shawn Cash and Jeff Jensen starting in 1993. Cosper continued in mid-days, followed by Brad Adams in afternoons and Nick Monroe nights. Later in 1993, Monroe moved to afternoons and Joe Gomez moved to nights. Another key to the station's success was playing local music on Sunday nights and eventually every hour. KWOD played an important role in giving early airplay to national acts Cake, Deftones, Oleander and Papa Roach.

Shortly after the move to their new headquarters in downtown Sacramento, part-time DJ Giles Hendriksen from the U.K. became the full-time afternoon host with Joe Gomez staying in the evening slot. Jamie Gates took over the overnight slot as well as programming both the "punk" and "industrial" music shows. Ally Storm moved to nights in the summer of 1994.

Weekend time slots included various on-air talent: Andy Prescott, David Conley, Mark Roberts, Brad Adams, Peter Davis (now ring announcer and sports commentator Peter Christensen), and Paul St. Francis.

Hosts of the local music show "The Sound of Sacramento", on Sunday nights, included Morris B (later Morris Knight), Aaron Kinney, David Conley (a local musician himself) and Peter Davis. The station released 3 compilations CD featuring local bands.

Early in 1996, Ally Storm departed to work at KOME in San Jose and (later moving to Live 105 in San Francisco) and Brad Adams returned to full time, taking over the 7PM - 12AM night slot.

The station reached its ratings peak as an alternative station in the summer of 1995 with a 5.2 (12+) share, making it one of the highest rated alternative stations in America at the time (as documented in the December 9, 1995 issue of Billboard). It also beat all four other rock stations in the market. Cosper remained with the station until resigning in November 1996. The following year he became a writer for radio/music trade magazine VirtuallyAlternative and became operations manager of WLUM/Milwaukee, owned by Super Bowl champion Willie Davis of the Green Bay Packers.

Ron Bunce assumed control of KWOD's programming in 1997, and took the station to an edgier harder rock direction, but the Arbitron ratings for the alternative format had peaked in 1995. Ironically, WLUM had been the station Ron Bunce had previously programmed.

During the early 2000s, DJ David X had a weekend show called X-Beats, which was mostly Electronic Dance Music (EDM) and hosted local talent such as Dina Lammon, aka DJ Dragn'fly, and DJ Elbereth, who were both local artists.

Throughout the 2000s KWOD stayed below a 3 share 12+, and was not competitive with rock station KRXQ. Over time, there was a lot of staff turnover. Morning personalities Shawn & Jeff left for KZZO in 2001 and were succeeded by Boomer and the Dave. Comedian Kelly Pryce eventually replaced Dave after KWOD's eventual sale to Entercom and the show later featured DJ Mervin and Ian Gary. Andy Sims also came on board in 2001 for middays, replacing Derek Moore, who later went on to 96.9 The Eagle.

==== Ownership change ====
In 2003, after a protracted seven-year court battle wherein violations of the Racketeer Influenced and Corrupt Organizations Act (RICO) were alleged, Entercom acquired KWOD from Royce International Broadcasting. Entercom left KWOD's Modern Rock/Alternative format intact until two years later.

==== Format adjustment ====
In Spring 2005, the Royce-era KWOD played its final song ("Nice to Know You" by Incubus) then started a two-week-long transition to a Modern AC/Light Alternative format with an auditory progress indicator between songs. Artists such as John Mayer and Tracy Chapman were added as harder rock bands like Korn and Deftones were dropped. The station re-branded itself "KWOD 2.0", and released the entire on-air staff. The station later shifted back toward its original approach, but the heritage KWOD on-air staff (Boomer & The Dave, Andy Sims, Nick Monroe, and Capone) did not return. Under Entercom's management, KWOD's overall 12+ ratings dropped under a 3 share throughout 2005 and 2006. In the Winter of 2007, KWOD's 12+ ratings fell below a 2 share.

In early 2006, KWOD picked up the syndicated Adam Carolla Show for the morning drive, and began to feature projects and shows devised by the disc jockeys, including the returning David X and Andy Sims. KWOD also started to feature a strong program of music including a focus on modern punk and indie music complemented by a "Never More Than 2 Minutes of Commercials" campaign. Sunday mornings featured a show from 7 a.m. to 10 a.m. called "Retro Revival" with David X as the host.

In February 2009, following the cancellation of the syndicated Adam Carolla Show, the morning drive time slot transitioned into playing music.

In May 2009, Program Director Curtiss Johnson posted a notice on KWOD's homepage announcing that the station would be shutting down on May 22. Citing economic difficulties as the primary reason for the shutdown, Johnson assured that the decision was local and not made by the owner corporation Entercom. At the time of the closure, the on-air staff consisted of Andy Hawk, Andy Sims, Rubin, Mike D "Dezego", and Laith the Intern.

The format change would leave Sacramento without a modern rock/alternative format station until March 3, 2010, when sister station KSSJ flipped from smooth jazz to a gold-based Alternative rock format, branded as "Radio 94-7."

Just before 9 a.m. on May 22, 2009, after playing Green Day's "21 Guns" and "Short Skirt/Long Jacket" by Sacramento band Cake, KWOD signed off.

=== '90s hits: 2009-2011 ===
At approximately 9 a.m. on May 22, 2009, the station became "106.5 The Buzz - Totally 90s", playing music exclusively from the 1990s, and using the call letters KBZC. The first song of the new "Buzz" format was Summertime by DJ Jazzy Jeff & the Fresh Prince. It was the first terrestrial all-1990s radio station, and the third all-1990s radio station after XM's '90s on 9 (now also on Sirius 9 since November 12, 2008) and the short-lived I-90 channel on Sirius from 2002.

KBZC advertised itself as playing "'90s and More", meaning that in addition to 1990s hits, they include some classics from previous decades in their playlists. It also aired pre-recorded short sayings with phrases and product references from the 1990s. In addition, the Snapple lady responded to questions submitted on the website. It was also reported in the Orange County Register in June 2009 that Jamie White would do a morning show starting on June 11, 2009. White would leave the station on April 22, 2011.

=== Rhythmic hits: 2011 ===
On September 2, 2011, at 5 p.m., after playing "I Wish" by Skee-Lo, KBZC dropped the All-'90s format and shifted to Rhythmic Adult Contemporary, retaining the "Buzz" moniker, but added a new slogan: "Feel Good Music." The first song under the relaunch was "Don't Stop The Music" by Rihanna. The station faced competition from the market's already established Rhythmic AC, KHYL, and featured a playlist that consisted of Rhythmic Pop currents and recurrents. The sudden flip came after it saw a decline in both its listener base and ratings, as well as an ill-fated attempt to expand its library to include music from the late 1980s and early 2000s.

=== Hot adult contemporary: 2011-2017 ===
Following the abrupt flip of Hot AC station KGBY to a simulcast of KFBK, Entercom flipped the format of KBZC to Hot AC as "Star 106.5" at noon on December 9, 2011, following an hour of songs signifying a "goodbye" theme and/or with the word "star" in the title. The first song on "Star" was "For the First Time" by The Script. The flip gave the market two Hot AC's, the other being CBS Radio's KZZO.

On March 31, 2014, KBZC changed their call letters back to KWOD. However, as part of a warehousing move by Entercom, KWOD changed their call letters to KUDL on April 7. The KUDL call letters were formerly used on KWOD's long-time adult contemporary sister station in the Kansas City market. The KWOD call letters, in turn, moved to KUDL's former 1660 AM frequency in that market.

=== Top 40: 2017-present ===
On February 2, 2017, Entercom announced its intent to merge with CBS Radio, who owned the fellow Sacramento AC and Adult CHR stations KYMX and KZZO, as well as KSFM, KNCI, and KHTK. The next day, Entercom announced that it would move the branding and contemporary hit radio format of sister station KDND, 107.9 The End, to KUDL, and return KDND's license to the FCC. The FCC had declared the renewal of KDND's license to be subject to hearing, disputing whether the station had served the public interest; in 2007, a woman died from water intoxication resulting from her participation in a "Hold Your Wee for a Wii" contest held by the station's morning show. Entercom stated that this decision was intended "to facilitate the timely FCC approvals for the planned combination with CBS Radio".

On February 6, 2017, KUDL shifted back to CHR as 106-5 The End. All of CBS Radio's existing stations in the market, except for KSFM (which would serve as a rhythmic contemporary companion to KUDL until August 2023, when that station switched to urban contemporary), were divested into a trust, and then acquired by Bonneville International (which had operated the stations in the interim on behalf of the trust) in August 2018.

== Awards and honors ==
- In 1993 and 2006 KWOD was named Station of the Year by Sac News & Review. It was also named Station of the Year in 1992 by the Sacramento Bee.

== KUDL-HD2 ==
KUDL's HD2 subcarrier, called Subterranean, formerly aired a format featuring Deep Rock tracks and album cuts. As of February 22, 2017, KUDL-HD2 had been broadcasting Radio Disney until the end of May 2018, when Entercom's deal with Radio Disney expired. The channel then carried reruns of the station's morning show The Wake Up Call. Recently, they started carrying their original HD subcarrier, Subterranean.
