= KZHP-LP =

Low-power FM radio station in Sacramento, California

- Sacramento, California; United States
- Broadcast area: Sacramento, California
- Frequency: 93.3 MHz
- Branding: Sacramento's K-ZAP

Programming
- Format: Rock/blues

Ownership
- Owner: Process Theatre, Inc.

History
- First air date: July 8, 2015 (10 years ago)
- Call sign meaning: Phonetical similarity to "Zap"

Technical information
- Licensing authority: FCC
- Facility ID: 194417
- Class: L1
- Power: 42 Watts
- HAAT: 46 meters (151 ft)
- Transmitter coordinates: 38°35′44.0″N 121°29′14.0″W

Links
- Public license information: LMS
- Webcast: Listen live
- Website: k-zap.org

KZHP-LP is a rock and blues formatted broadcast radio station licensed to and serving Sacramento, California. KZHP-LP is owned and operated by Process Theatre, Inc. The station in an affiliate of the syndicated Pink Floyd program "Floydian Slip."
