= KRPU =

- Rocklin, California; United States
- Broadcast area: Sacramento, California
- Frequency: 1210 kHz
- Branding: Prime Asia Radio

Programming
- Format: South Asian (Indian and Pakistani)

Ownership
- Owner: Ranjit Singh Bajwa and Sarabjit Kaur Kahiya; (DABAJ, LLC)

History
- First air date: 1988
- Former call signs: KFRP (1986-1988, CP); KEBR (1988–2015)

Technical information
- Licensing authority: FCC
- Facility ID: 20930
- Class: D
- Power: 5,000 watts (day); 80 watts (night)
- Transmitter coordinates: 38°27′45.7″N 121°7′52.8″W (day); 38°43′43.6″N 121°19′12.8″W}(night)

Links
- Public license information: Public file; LMS

KRPU (1210 AM, "Radio Punjab") is a radio station licensed to Rocklin, California, United States, and serves the Sacramento market. It features a South Asian format focused on the local Indian and Pakistani communities. Its transmitters—separate for daytime and nighttime operation—are near Rancho Murieta and Roseville, respectively. The station went on the air in 1988.

The station began broadcasting as an owned-and-operated station of the non-commercial Christian radio network Family Radio, airing religious music and bible talks from radio evangelist Harold Camping. It was the replacement for the 100.5 facility that Family Radio sold off for commercial use, which became KQPT in April 1988. From late 1991 to May 2003, Family Radio simulcast its programming on both 1210 AM and on KEBR-FM at 89.3 MHz in North Highlands, California, but this FM station was sold to KQED and became KQEI-FM as an NPR news and talk station. Family Radio's current FM outlet in Sacramento is KEBR (88.1 FM).

An application for consent to assign KEBR's license from Family Stations, Inc. to Spice Radio, Inc. was accepted for filing by the U.S. Federal Communications Commission on April 13, 2015. The asset purchase agreement dated March 31, 2015, states that the purchase price is $600,000. The transaction was consummated on September 4, 2015.

The station changed its call sign to the current KRPU on September 18, 2015.
