= KIFM =

ESPN Radio affiliate in West Sacramento, California

West Sacramento, California; United States
- Broadcast area: Sacramento metro area; Northern California
- Frequency: 1320 kHz
- Branding: ESPN 1320

Programming
- Language: English
- Format: Sports
- Affiliations: BetMGM Network; ESPN Radio

Ownership
- Owner: Audacy, Inc.; (Audacy License, LLC)
- Sister stations: KKDO; KRXQ; KSEG; KSFM; KUDL

History
- First air date: April 23, 1945 (as KCRA)
- Former call signs: KCRA (1945–1978); KGNR (1978–1990); KCTC (1990–2016)
- Former frequencies: 1340 kHz (1945–1948)
- Call sign meaning: Previously used on KXSN in San Diego

Technical information
- Licensing authority: FCC
- Facility ID: 67848
- Class: B
- Power: 5,000 watts day; 620 watts night
- Transmitter coordinates: 38°38′10.7″N 121°33′12.8″W
- Repeater(s): 98.5 KRXQ-HD2 (Sacramento)

Links
- Public license information: Public file; LMS
- Webcast: Listen live (via Audacy)
- Website: www.audacy.com/espn1320

KIFM (1320 AM) is a radio station in West Sacramento, California, that has been affiliated with ESPN Radio since February 2007. Owned and operated by Audacy, Inc.. Its studios are located in North Highlands, with a Sacramento address. Previously, KIFM was known as KCTC, which has had a history in the Sacramento market as both an FM and AM station.

== KCTC as an FM station ==
KCTC's most successful years were in the 70s, broadcasting a variant of the "Beautiful Music" format which they called "the California Sound" with its occasional vocals in each 15-minute set. The format continued until 1989, when KCTC became KYMX, a soft rock/adult contemporary station. In turn, the KCTC call letters moved to AM 1320, where for years it was an adult standards station as part of the Music Of Your Life network.

== KCTC as an AM station ==
Competition for KCRA on the Sacramento AM dial in the mid-1950s included KROY 1240 (CBS), KGMS 1380 (MBS), KXOA 1470 (MBS), and KFBK 1530 (ABC), which was owned by McClatchy Enterprises, also owner of the Sacramento Bee..

From 1955 to 1978, KCRA was co-owned with TV Channel 3 KCRA-TV and in the '70s was known as KCRA Newsradio 132 while still under ownership of Kelly Broadcasting. Before its sale to Entercom, KCTC was owned by Tribune Broadcasting of Chicago, owners of WGN and the Chicago Tribune, from 1978 to 1996. For a time under the Tribune ownership (1978–1989), 1320 AM was known as KGNR Newsradio 132. In the early 1970s, prior to Tribune, 1320 KCRA was Sacramento's home for the syndicated American Top 40 program with Casey Kasem; a September 1971 broadcast of the show mentions KCRA as an affiliate, as does a broadcast of the syndicated program from December 1974. In 1989, KCTC moved from its former FM position to its current home at 1320 AM.

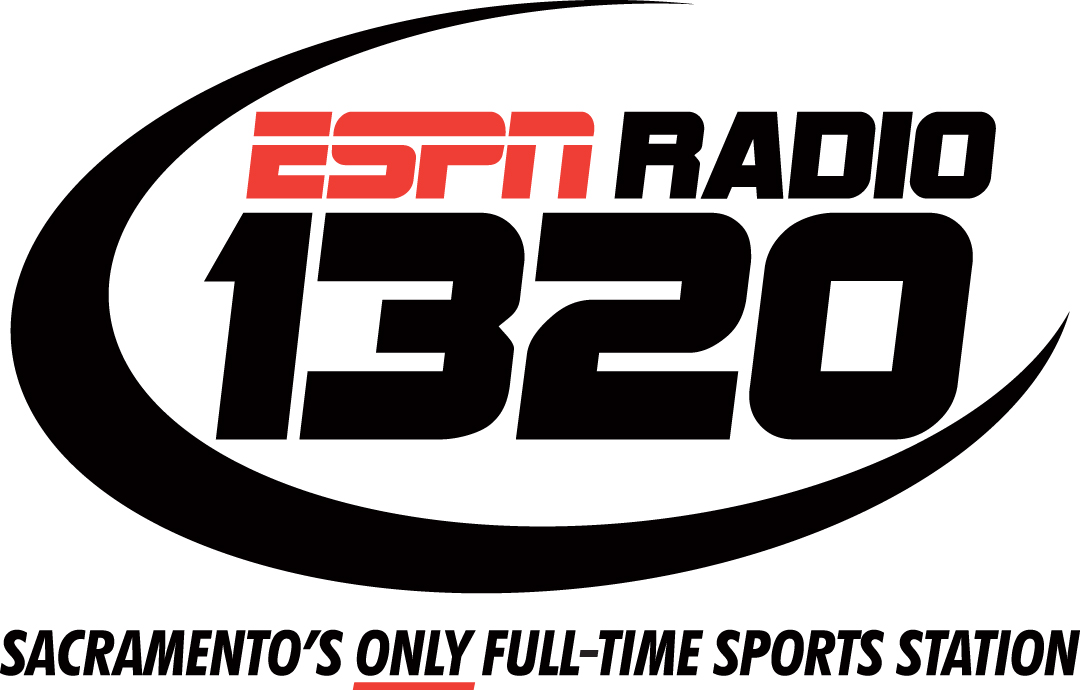
Previous logo

On November 1, 2005, KCTC changed formats, dropping the Music Of Your Life format to become an Air America affiliate after crosstown rival KSAC-1240 AM dropped its Air America affiliation. However, KCTC's website announced on February 15, 2007, that AM 1320 would no longer carry Air America programs, and also would not retain Enid Goldstein or The Morning Retort with Scott and Sims. The site announced that as of Monday, February 26, 2007, KCTC would become ESPN 1320, carrying the complete sports programming of the ESPN radio network. This move would make KCTC Sacramento's first full-time sports radio station.

== KIFM ==
On April 28, 2016, KCTC changed its call sign to KIFM, which was formerly used on 98.1 FM in San Diego, as part of a warehousing move by owner Entercom (that station concurrently changed its call sign to KXSN as part of a format change). That station uses "KIFM" as a non-call branding for its second HD Radio subchannel, using it to play an automated form of its former smooth jazz format.

The station carried San Francisco 49ers games in the Sacramento area until 2023, when the rights moved to KHTK.

The station moved its community of license from Sacramento to West Sacramento effective January 23, 2024.
