= KDND =

Radio station in Sacramento, California (1947–2017)

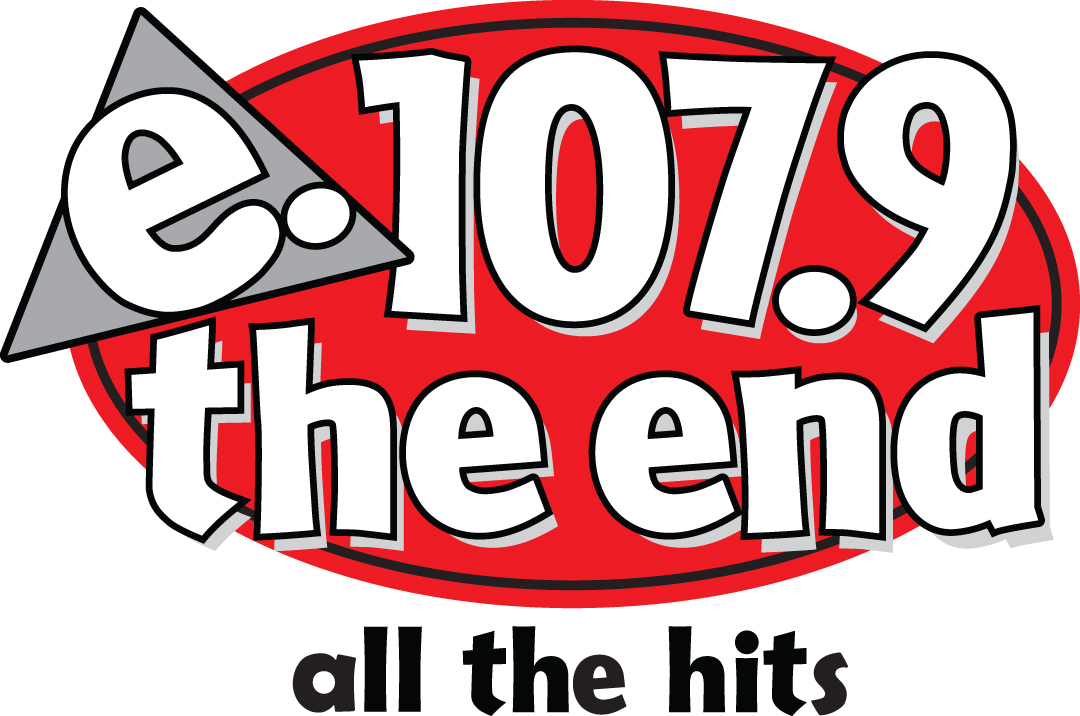
- Sacramento, California; United States
- Frequency: 107.9 MHz
- Branding: 107.9 The End

Programming
- Format: Contemporary hit radio

Ownership
- Owner: Entercom Communications; (Entercom Communications License, LLC)

History
- First air date: June 1947
- Last air date: February 8, 2017
- Former call signs: KXOA-FM (1945–1961, 1962–1971, 1978–1997); KCNW (1961–1962); KXOA (1971–1978, 1997–1998)
- Former frequencies: 102.9 MHz (1947)
- Call sign meaning: "The End" (station located at the right end of the American FM broadcast spectrum)

Technical information
- Facility ID: 65483
- Class: B
- ERP: 50,000 watts
- HAAT: 123 meters (404 ft)
- Transmitter coordinates: 38.710°N 121.483°W

KDND (107.9 MHz) was an FM radio station licensed to Sacramento, California, United States. The station first signed on in 1947 as KXOA-FM, an FM simulcast of AM station KXOA, before separating itself with distinct programming, including most prominently soft rock, adult contemporary, and classic hits formats. In July 1998, two years after the sale of the station to Entercom (now Audacy, Inc.), the station switched to its final KDND call letters and contemporary hit radio format branded as 107.9 The End. At the time of the station's closing, KDND's studios were located in North Highlands (though with a Sacramento address). In contrast, its transmitter was located just north of the Sacramento city limits near Elverta.

In January 2007, KDND's morning show controversially held an on-air contest called "Hold Your Wee for a Wii" in which contestants were challenged to drink as much water as they could without urinating, to win a Wii video game console. Twenty-eight-year-old contest participant Jennifer Strange died of water intoxication, resulting in Entercom being sued for wrongful death by Strange's family. The Federal Communications Commission (FCC) also investigated the incident; in 2016, it designated the renewal of KDND's license for a hearing, questioning whether the station had operated in the public interest.

Citing that its continued operation could affect Entercom's proposed acquisition of CBS Radio, KDND was shut down on February 8, 2017, and its format and branding were moved to KUDL two days earlier on February 6. The FCC auctioned the frequency in 2021; iHeartMedia won the bidding, and KSTE-FM (now KZIS) began broadcasting on May 4, 2022.

== As KXOA-FM ==
=== Early years ===
On September 25, 1945, Lincoln Dellar, who had signed on KXOA (1470 AM) on May 20 of that year, applied to the Federal Communications Commission (FCC) to build a new FM radio station in Sacramento, originally specifying 95.9 MHz as the frequency. The construction permit was granted on December 19, 1945, but changes in program planning and technical adjustments in the early days of the present 88–108 MHz band meant that the station debuted at 102.9 MHz in June 1947 before being moved to 107.9 MHz within months. For most of this time, KXOA simulcast the AM station, which since its launch had been an affiliate of the Mutual Broadcasting System. In July 1957, KXOA dropped Mutual to become a music and news station; later that year, the KXOA stations were sold to Cal-Val Radio.

In 1961, Cal-Val experimented with splitting the AM and FM stations, changing the FM to a country format as KCNW. The experiment was undone by the next year, and KCNW returned to being KXOA-FM. Both stations were then sold to Producers, Inc., of Milwaukee for $500,000 in 1963. Upon the 1965 enactment of the FM Non-Duplication Rule, which curtailed simulcasts of AM and FM stations in large markets, KXOA-FM separated its programming from its AM counterpart. In 1969, the station raised its effective radiated power from 12,500 watts to more than 49,000.

In 1970, the KXOA stations were split by then-owner Fuqua Industries, with the AM station leased to investors involved in the ownership of KSJO in San Jose and the FM to a group led by L. Ray Rhodes. However, the Rhodes group did not materialize, and three months later, Fuqua filed to sell the station to a consortium consisting of Drake-Chenault, a national program syndicator, and Brown Broadcasting, which owned KGB-AM-FM in San Diego. The sale became effective at the start of 1971; the FM retained the call sign, while the AM became known as KNDE. Drake-Chenault moved the station to Loma Vista Drive off Fulton Avenue. In 1971, the station flipped to oldies, and after a brief period as "Earth Rock", the oldies format returned in February 1973.

=== Rock and adult contemporary ===
In June 1974, the station dropped the automated Drake-Chenault oldies format, which had been low-rated, to become a rock station known as K-108 with live disc jockeys. Later that year, the Browns bought Drake—Chenault's half of KXOA-FM. The station's format was referred to by Radio & Records as "soft album-oriented rock" (AOR). In 1978, the Browns bought back KNDE and returned it to the fold as KXOA, to air a harder AOR mix. Art Schroeder, the KXOA-FM program director during this period, credited the "safe" approach with attracting many listeners not wishing to hear punk rock.

KXOA-FM was among several stations affected by the rapid rise of KZAP (98.5 FM) at the start of the 1980s, but KZAP's ratings fell several years later, and KXOA-FM remained successful throughout the decade and leading the market in ratings and revenue in the mid-1980s. The KXOA stations also had a regionally recognized news team led by Ken Hunt.

In the early 1990s, KXOA-FM's popularity began to wane following the launch of competitors in KYMX and KGBY, falling from third place to tenth within the Sacramento market. Brown responded by hiring a new operations manager, Don Daniels, from WOMC in Detroit. Daniels moved to drop 1960s songs from the station's repertoire, and in May 1993, the station flipped to a more uptempo adult contemporary format branded as Xtra 107.9. It also dropped its local news coverage. The format did not improve KXOA's ratings; on March 25, 1994, the station flipped to a classic hits format branded as Arrow 108, adapted from Los Angeles' KCBS-FM. The Arrow format challenged KSEG (96.9 FM) and KHYL (101.1 FM).

In July 1996, Brown Broadcasting sold KXOA-AM-FM and KQPT (100.5 FM) to American Radio Systems for $50 million, bringing it to the market limit of five FM and three AM stations. Not even two weeks later, ARS acquired EZ Communications, which owned two FM and one AM stations in the market. As a result, ARS needed to sell three Sacramento stations. KXOA was sold to Entercom, which simultaneously acquired KSEG and KRXQ (93.7 FM) from Jacor Communications; the two purchases, totaling $65 million, gave Entercom a trio of rock-oriented radio stations. The combination of rock stations proved a problem for differentiating them and even resulted in changes in airstaff at stablemate KSEG. Management ultimately decided that the format was simply too similar to that station.

== As KDND ==
At noon on July 14, 1998, Entercom made a move that general manager John Geary admitted should have occurred a year prior and flipped KXOA to Top 40/CHR as 107.9 The End with new KDND call letters. In January 1999, KXOA's original Arrow format and branding were recycled by the former KRAK-FM at 93.7 MHz, replacing an ailing classic country station.

=== "Hold Your Wee for a Wii" contest ===
On January 12, 2007, KDND's morning show, the Morning Rave, held an on-air contest entitled Hold Your Wee for a Wii, in which contestants were asked to drink as much water as they could without urinating. The contestant able to hold the most water would win a Wii video game console; having recently come out in November 2006, the Nintendo console was a very popular and sought-after item but was nearly impossible to find in stores in North America.

According to contest participants, 18 contestants took part in the competition in a room at KDND's studios. The contest began in the morning as contestants were each handed 8-US-fluid-ounce (240 ml) water bottles to drink at 15-minute intervals. Contestants also said that as the contest progressed, they were given increasingly larger quantities of water to drink. According to witness reports, 28-year-old Jennifer Strange, who placed second in the contest, may have drunk nearly 2 U.S. gallons (7.6 L).

The Sacramento Bee released audio clips from the morning show indicating that the disc jockeys were aware of the death of Matthew Carrington by water intoxication. At one point, a nurse contacted the station and informed the DJs that the contest could be dangerous and potentially fatal. The DJs responded by saying that the contestants had signed releases; according to a contestant, the waivers addressed only publicity issues and made no mention of health or safety concerns. The DJs also joked about Strange's distended belly, joking that she looked three months pregnant.

After the contest, Strange spoke to a co-worker by telephone, indicating she was on her way home and in extreme pain, suffering from what appeared to be an intense headache. The co-worker contacted Strange's mother, who then went to her home to find her dead.

==== Aftermath ====
On January 15, 2007, KDND management posted a note to the station's website including a note from John Geary, vice president and general manager, expressing sympathies announcing that the Morning Rave program would be taken off the air indefinitely pending an investigation. The next day, Geary dismissed ten station employees—including the three morning disc jockeys, Lukas Cox, Steve Maney and Patricia "Trish" Sweet—from their positions in connection with the tragedy and cancelled the Morning Rave.

The Associated Press reported that the Sacramento County Sheriff's Department spokesman said no officers were investigating the death and that, "It was a contest and people are saying there was no coercion." However, Deborah Hoffman of KXTV reported that former prosecutor Bill Portanova commented that "the radio station has some serious liability exposure", due in part to widespread news coverage of the Matthew Carrington case two years earlier. On January 18, the Los Angeles Times reported that Sacramento Sheriff John McGinness had ordered homicide detectives to investigate whether a crime had been committed. On April 2, the Sacramento County District Attorney's Office declined to press criminal charges, citing a lack of evidence of criminal misconduct.

A wrongful death lawsuit was announced on January 18 on behalf of Strange's husband and three children against Entercom and KDND's operating subsidiary, Entercom Sacramento LLC. The Strange family was represented by prominent Sacramento attorney Roger A. Dreyer of the firm of Dreyer, Babich, Buccola & Callaham, LLP. The Stranges urged the FCC to shut down the station and punish Entercom. On January 24, the FCC announced that it would investigate KDND to see if it violated the terms of its license. In August, two of the KDND DJs, Lukas Cox and Steve Maney, sued Entercom over a wrongful termination of their contract.

Shortly prior to the start of jury selection in the trial, KDND began to tease that it would be "saying goodbye" on September 8, 2009, leading to speculation that the station was planning to drop The End in favor of a different format; however, it was later revealed that the campaign was actually for a new commercial-free Tuesdays promotion. Over the next month, the jury at the wrongful death case heard testimony from over 41 witnesses as 192 exhibits were entered into evidence. On October 29, 2009, after a week of deliberations, the jury awarded the survivors of Jennifer Strange the sum of $16,577,118 in monetary damages. Entercom Sacramento LLC was found to be 100% at fault for Strange's death, while Entercom Communications was found to be 0% at fault. The jury also found that Strange was 0% at fault (that is, there was no contributory negligence) for her own death.

The former "Morning Rave" hosts went on other radio jobs in different markets; Cox hosted mornings at KRBB in Wichita, Kansas, and, as of 2021, was working at KPLD in St. George, Utah. Maney hosted mornings on WNKS in Charlotte, and Sweet hosted mornings on WPLJ in New York City under the name Jayde Donovan until the station's sale in 2019; she now hosts a show on Apple Music 1 and a show syndicated through Westwood One.

The Media Action Center, a watchdog organization founded by former producer Sue Wilson, filed a petition to deny KDND's license when it was up for renewal in 2013. In October 2016, the FCC designated Entercom's license renewal for KDND for hearing, disputing whether the station had operated in the public interest over its previous license term, spanning from 2005 to 2013.

=== Shutdown ===
On February 2, 2017, Entercom announced its intent to acquire CBS Radio. The next day, Entercom announced that KDND would cease operations effective February 8 and that its license would be terminated and returned to the FCC. Entercom stated that "it is in the company's best interests to voluntarily turn in the KDND license to facilitate the timely FCC approvals for the planned combination with CBS Radio". The then-chief of enforcement for the FCC stated to the Sacramento Bee that the motive was financial and that Entercom would likely have fought had a merger not been planned.

KDND's format and The End branding were re-located to sister station KUDL at 9:00 a.m. on February 6 (the last song before the move was "Scars to Your Beautiful" by Alessia Cara). 107.9 then began stunting with a jockless playlist of pop music occasionally interrupted by static-backed liners redirecting listeners to KUDL and advising remaining listeners of the impending shutoff of the signal; this would later transition to a loop of "Bye Bye Bye" by N'Sync and "End" staffers redirecting listeners to KUDL. As the station's final program, a farewell special aired at 11:30 p.m. on the 7th, hosted by former afternoon DJ Chris K, playing music from the End's 18-year history. This special also culminated with "Bye Bye Bye" by N'Sync. Before the song was finished, KDND's transmitter was shut down on February 8 at 12:01 a.m., bringing a close to the nearly 70-year history of the station.

Entercom also paid the Media Action Center $35,000 for attorney fees involved in their petition to deny renewal; in return, the Media Action Center would not challenge other Entercom licenses or the CBS Radio acquisition.

On September 7, 2017, the FCC deleted the license for KDND after denying a Petition for Reconsideration and Application for Review filed by Ed Stolz, the former owner of the station at 106.5 MHz when it was KWOD; Stolz had sought to have his 1996 sale of the station rescinded so he could resume control. The FCC ruled that Stolz's arguments had no merit and that he was not a party of interest in the dispute between Media Action Center and Entercom that led to the license revocation hearing.

== Reuse of the frequency in Sacramento ==
The FCC added KDND's vacated 107.9 frequency to the agency's inventory of unused channels, to be put up for auction to the highest bidder. The FCC stipulated that use of the frequency must retain its short-spaced protections to KSAN (107.7 FM) in San Mateo, California; any new station would be limited to 50 kW ERP and an average height above average terrain of 123 meters (404 ft) in the direction of KSAN. The FCC included the 107.9 frequency in its auction scheduled to begin April 28, 2020, but the auction was indefinitely postponed on March 25, 2020, during the onset of the COVID-19 pandemic. The allocation was again put up for auction as part of FCC Auction 109 beginning July 27, 2021, and was auctioned off to iHeartMedia for $6,146,000.

KSTE-FM began broadcasts on May 4, 2022, using the former KDND transmission facility at Elverta; following a month of stunting, the new station launched a hot adult contemporary format on June 8, 2022, and subsequently changed its call sign to KZIS.
