= KRXQ =

Radio station in Sacramento, California

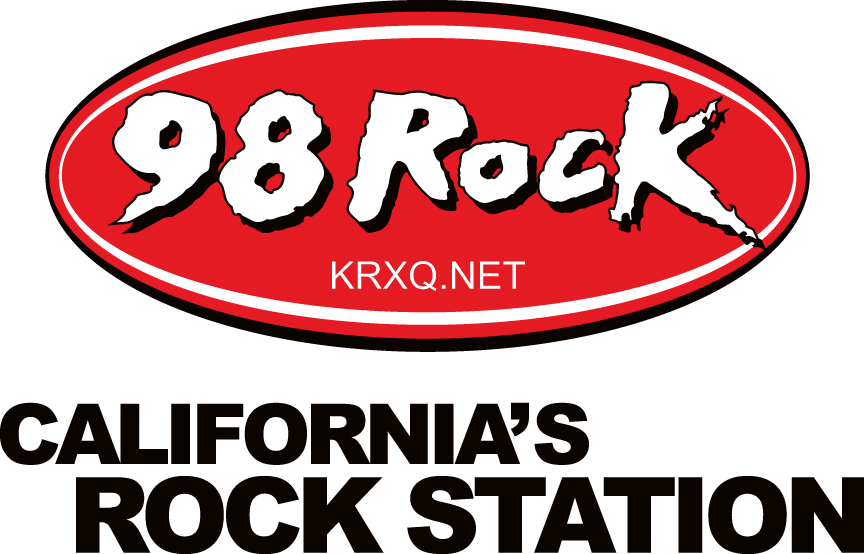
- Sacramento, California; United States
- Broadcast area: Sacramento metropolitan area
- Frequency: 98.5 MHz (HD Radio)
- Branding: 98 Rock

Programming
- Language: English
- Format: Mainstream rock
- Subchannels: HD2: ESPN 1320 (KIFM)

Ownership
- Owner: Audacy, Inc.; (Audacy License, LLC)
- Sister stations: KIFM; KKDO; KSEG; KSFM; KUDL

History
- First air date: November 1, 1959
- Former call signs: KXRQ (1959–68); KZAP (1968–92); KNCI (1992–94); KRAK (1994–98); KRAK-FM (1998)
- Call sign meaning: "California Rocks"

Technical information
- Licensing authority: FCC
- Facility ID: 20354
- Class: B
- ERP: 50,000 watts
- HAAT: 151 meters (495 ft)
- Transmitter coordinates: 38.648°N 121.099°W

Links
- Public license information: Public file; LMS
- Webcast: Listen live (via Audacy)
- Website: www.audacy.com/krxq

KRXQ (98.5 FM, "98 Rock") is a commercial radio station in Sacramento, California. The station is owned by Audacy, Inc. and broadcasts a mainstream rock format. KRXQ's studios are located in Roseville and its transmitter is in Folsom.

== History ==
=== Variety/jazz: 1959-1968 ===
The station at 98.5 FM first signed on November 1, 1959, as KXRQ. Owned and operated by Dale Flewelling, it was dedicated by then-California Governor Pat Brown. From its original studios and transmitter located on the 13th floor of the Elks building in downtown Sacramento, KXRQ operated daily from 7:00 a.m. to 2:00 a.m. with an effective radiated power of 35,000 watts. From its elevated location, KXRQ enjoyed broad coverage throughout the Sacramento Valley. Bruce Jensen was the program director during the station's first year and programmed a varied mix of popular music during the day and jazz late at night and weekend afternoons. From 1960 until mid-1966, Paul Thompson served in the same capacity; he adjusted the format to present a more sophisticated and swinging mix with an easy jazz touch during the daytime with more straightforward jazz heard later at night. At one point KXRQ became an all-jazz station for about two years; however, commercial support for the station waned and it restored the swinging sound format. Following the departure of Thompson, the station continued in the same direction for a while, but by early 1968 the station was having financial difficulties, and was only broadcasting from 3:00 p.m. to 8:00 p.m.

=== Rock: 1968-1992 ===
==== Freeform launch and early AOR years ====
In mid-1968, KXRQ was purchased by Lee Gahagan, doing business as the California Talking Machine and Wireless Company, for $60,000. Gahagan also owned a classical music station, KPGM, in the South Bay area, and he intended to place a classical format on his new Sacramento frequency. In the process of the sale, Flewelling was required to pay a $5,000 fine to the Federal Communications Commission (FCC) for a series of rule violations. Gahagan was approached by students from California State University, Sacramento who worked at campus radio station KERS (90.7 FM), who suggested that the new station run a "freeform" format similar to KMPX and KSAN in San Francisco. Gahagan agreed, and, on November 8, 1968, 98.5 FM emerged from months of silence as KZAP. The call letters had become available months earlier when a station in Houston changed its own. KZAP made an immediate impression on the youth audience in Sacramento; in 1970, a year and a half after debuting, Sacramento Bee publisher C. K. McClatchy noted in an editorial that it "has a particular following among young people". KZAP was the first station in the United States to air a commercial for condoms (in 1972), and it was instrumental in securing the end of a hostage situation when KZAP reassured the gunman that he would not be harmed if he emerged without a weapon.

On May 3, 1972, Lee Gahagan unexpectedly died at the age of 27; his death was considered a suicide. His estate sold the station for $200,100 to the New Day Broadcasting Company, led by Ed Beimfohr, the next year. Under New Day, KZAP settled into a format that was becoming known in the industry as album-oriented rock. It also began broadcasting in Stereo Quadraphonic sound in 1974; previous owner Gahagan had been a pioneer in quadraphonic.

==== Sale to Western Cities and ratings success ====
It was a 1978 sale that would be even more impactful for KZAP: a $1.4 million sale to Western Cities Broadcasting, owners of stations in Las Vegas and Tucson. While the new owners stated no plans for major changes, January 1979 brought with it a major personnel shuffle and the dismissal of a series of DJs and the program director. Consulted by Burkhart/Abrams with its "Superstars" format, KZAP reversed a two-year ratings slide and claimed the market lead in the spring 1979 Arbitron survey, going from a 2.7 share to an 8.5 and putting a dent in the ratings of format competitor KSFM (102.5 FM). The next year, KZAP would peak in the ratings at a 13.4.

Through the 1980s, KZAP remained competitive in the radio ratings. It also aged with its audience; by 1985, it aired a mix of current and classic rock. However, in November 1990, KROY (96.9 FM) flipped to classic rock as KSEG, "The Eagle". As KSEG and KRXQ (93.7 FM) fought for its listeners, KZAP's ratings fell from a 4.9 in 1990 to a 2.9 in 1991–the lowest figures since Western Cities, now Nationwide Communications, bought the station.

=== Country: 1992-1998 ===
The Zap that I knew died a long time ago. What it ended up was just a ghost of itself.

— Kevin "Boom Boom" Anderson, former KZAP personality and 1990 morning host at KRXQ 93.7

On January 20, 1992 at midnight, after playing the song "Cristo Redentor" by Harvey Mandel, KZAP flipped to a country music format known as "Fresh Country 98.5". Shortly thereafter, the station changed its call letters to KNCI, for Nationwide Communications, Incorporated. As part of the format flip, all of the air staff except for the news director were dismissed, with shifts being filled by personalities from two other Nationwide-owned country outlets. The move gave KRAK-FM (Country 105) its first market competitor. A low-power FM station in Sacramento, KZHP-LP, brands itself as "KZAP" in a nod to the legacy of the original station; some of the original KZAP DJs are part of KZHP-LP.

A year later, EZ Communications, which owned KRAK-FM, acquired KNCI-FM for $13 million. In February 1994, KNCI and KRAK-FM swapped frequencies, bringing the KRAK call sign to 98.5 FM. On January 17, 1997, the station shifted its focus to classic country as "Gold Country", differentiating itself from KNCI. The station's ratings were short of stellar.

=== Rock: 1998-present ===
A $120 million deal between EXCL Communications and American Radio Systems, which had bought EZ Communications in 1996, led to a series of shuffles in the Bay Area and Sacramento that were required in order to meet antitrust conditions. Among them was a frequency swap between KRAK and Entercom-owned active rock station KRXQ, then at 93.7 FM. The swap occurred on March 4, 1998 at 3 p.m., sending the KRAK call letters to 93.7 FM and KRXQ to 98.5 FM, now called "98 Rock". Now on a better signal as a result of the swap, KRXQ continued its active rock format, focusing on the top 25–30 rock singles while mixing in recurrent and classic tracks. Generally, the station had a running library of roughly 300 songs. In the spring of 1999, Entercom fired KRXQ morning drive time hosts the Rise Guys (The Phantom, Whitey Gleason & Justin Case) from their shift and hired the Rob, Arnie and Dawn Show from KDOT in Reno. In this new format on 93.7 FM, the station garnered a 12+ share (ratings) in the lower to mid 4s to lower 5s, and dominated in the target demographic of adults 18–34, and male listeners.

Jim Fox was appointed station manager in late 2003, and he recruited Joe Maumee—a charismatic, gruff-voiced "fun lover"—for the evening time slot. The daily lineup consisted of Rob, Arnie and Dawn in morning drive; long-time staff member Pat Martin (formerly of KGB-FM in San Diego and KMET in Los Angeles) in middays; and Craig the Dogface Boy (Dog) joining in 2004 in afternoons.

In 2004, the FCC fined KRXQ $55,000 for broadcasting indecent material.

Dog and Joe teamed up in 2008 to form the Dog and Joe Show, and Mikey (Mike Muscatello) assuming nights. Mikey left the night show for other opportunities with Cristi briefly taking over the evening timeslot; he later returned to the show. Dog and Joe left KRXQ in March 2017 to host mornings on 93.7 The River, Mikey assuming afternoons and Leeanne nights.

By the late 2000s, the station completed the shift to active rock from mainstream rock with Nielsen BDS going first and Mediabase following suit later. More recently, KRXQ moved back to mainstream rock, featuring a mix of alternative and classic rock along with hip hop tracks that crossed over to the rock chart, such as those from Beastie Boys, Eminem, and House of Pain.

On the weekend of April 29–30, 2006, KRXQ stunted as "The Flannel Channel", playing mostly rock hits from the 1990s with no recent or older songs. The station returned to its regular mainstream rock format on May 1. No on-air explanation was given for the temporary name change. However, according to station manager Jim Fox, the switch was an unannounced publicity stunt to celebrate the release of Pearl Jam's new self-titled album on May 2 and to "scare the listeners". Fox explained off-air:

This weekend 98 Rock celebrated the release of Pearl Jam's new CD by spotlighting 1990s Grunge bands. Over the weekend 98 Rock became "The Flannel Channel" and we played 1990s bands exclusively. Based upon the feedback we've received, flannel is OUT! ...and so is the Flannel Channel.

— Jim Fox, KRXQ station manager

On May 28, 2009, hosts Rob Williams and Arnie States from the Rob, Arnie, and Dawn Show drew media attention in reference to two news stories regarding transgender children. States said, "God forbid if my son put on a pair of high heels, I would probably hit him with one of my shoes". Williams and States took turns referring to gender dysphoric children as "idiots" and "freaks", who were just out "for attention" and had "a mental disorder that just needs to somehow be gotten out of them", either by verbal abuse on the part of the parents, or even shock therapy. In response, several advertisers (including Snapple, Sonic Drive-In, Carl's Jr, Bank of America, Wells Fargo, Verizon, Chipotle Mexican Grill, AT&T, and McDonald's) temporarily pulled their advertising from KRXQ. Nissan similarly declined to renew an advertising contract with the station.

In 2015, States left the station and the show's name was changed to the Rob, Anybody, and Dawn (RAD) show.

In June 2023, the RAD show exited the station after 24 years. The next month, afternoon program The Bailey Show moved to the morning slot. That show would last until mid-2024, when Paul Marshall would return to the station to host mornings. Marshall would exit in early 2026, replaced in mornings by afternoon host Abe Kanan.

== HD Radio ==
KRXQ broadcasts in HD Radio with two digital subchannels:

- KRXQ-HD1 is a digital simulcast of the analog signal.
- KRXQ-HD2 is a digital simulcast of sister station ESPN 1320 (KIFM).
