= KKDO =

Radio station in Fair Oaks–Sacramento, California

- Fair Oaks, California; United States
- Broadcast area: Sacramento metropolitan area
- Frequency: 94.7 MHz (HD Radio)
- Branding: ALT 94.7

Programming
- Language: English
- Format: Alternative rock
- Subchannels: HD2: Channel Q

Ownership
- Owner: Audacy, Inc.; (Audacy License, LLC)
- Sister stations: KIFM; KRXQ; KSEG; KSFM; KUDL

History
- First air date: November 25, 1970; 55 years ago
- Former call signs: KNIS (1970–1990); KRWR (1990–1992); KIZS (1992–1994); KTHX (1994–1997); KBYA (1997); KSSJ (1997–2010)
- Call sign meaning: "Radio"

Technical information
- Licensing authority: FCC
- Facility ID: 6810
- Class: B1
- ERP: 25,000 watts
- HAAT: 99 meters (325 ft)
- Transmitter coordinates: 38.673°N 121.332°W

Links
- Public license information: Public file; LMS
- Webcast: Listen live (via Audacy)
- Website: www.audacy.com/alt947

KKDO (94.7 FM) is a commercial radio station licensed to Fair Oaks, California, and serving the Sacramento metropolitan area radio market. The station is branded "Alt 94-7" and it programs an alternative rock radio format. The Audacy, Inc. outlet has its transmitter off Rosebud Lane in Citrus Heights. Its studios are located in Roseville, California.

KKDO broadcasts in the HD Radio format. Its HD2 subchannel carries "Channel Q", an Audacy format of LGBTQ talk and EDM dance music.

== History ==
=== As a Carson City station: 1970-1998 ===
Western Inspirational Broadcasters was incorporated in 1962 to construct a new religious radio station. In 1969, land was acquired on McClelland Peak near Virginia City, Nevada, for the construction of a tower; the Federal Communications Commission (FCC) granted the necessary construction permit on December 30, 1969. KNIS—"Nevada's Inspirational Station"—made its first broadcast on 94.7 MHz on November 25, 1970. The original studios were in a trailer. Programming included Christian music, talk, and public affairs.

In 1988, Western Inspirational obtained a construction permit for the non-commercial 91.3 MHz frequency in Carson City. It sold the existing 94.7 facility, which could be converted to commercial authorization, to Sapphire Broadcasting of Washington, D.C., The KNIS call letters and programming moved to 91.3 when the frequency change occurred in October 1989.

The 94.7 frequency returned as a commercial station under the call sign KRWR in June 1990, using a Satellite Music Network–programmed adult contemporary format. The owner of Sapphire, Tom Gammon, immediately applied to the FCC proposing to move KRWR to Fair Oaks, California, in the Sacramento market. The FCC accepted the proposal for hearing opposite applications from other regional radio stations.

While the station remained in the Carson City–Reno area, it changed call signs twice. In April 1992, it became KIZS "Kiss Country", which was managed by Americom Inc. under a local marketing agreement (LMA) alongside KODS (103.7 FM). The station flipped to a hybrid of classic rock and talk on September 27, 1993, branding as "Jaws FM".

The second change of call sign and format was precipitated by the 1994 acquisition of KTHX-FM 101.7 by Sunbelt Communications Company. Sunbelt, owner of KRNV television, planned to replace the alternative rock programming of "The X" with an all-news radio format. The changeover to a new format was originally slated for May 1, but delays in hiring a team to run the news station gave the outgoing KTHX a temporary reprieve until July 11, when the new KRNV-FM debuted.

A month after The X disappeared at 101.7 MHz, the manager of KIZS announced his station was negotiating to take on its format and airstaff, leading to 800 phone calls in support of the idea. On August 25, 1994, KTHX and the alternative format debuted at 94.7. In April 1996, Scott Seidenstricker of Fresno, California, acquired the intellectual property of The X from Americom and took over the LMA with Sapphire.

=== Move-in to Sacramento and smooth jazz format ===
The station's former logo under previous format

In December 1996, Sapphire Broadcasting sold KTHX to the Susquehanna Radio Corporation in a $14.95 million purchase, with the company intending to make the Fair Oaks move to place the frequency in the Sacramento market. Seidenstricker was left needing in the medium term a new frequency to air The X. On January 7, 1997, The X found its new frequency: 100.1 MHz, which was owned by Americom.

Meanwhile, Susquehanna was immediately speculated to be seeking to sell or trade KTHX for a station elsewhere. This transpired in July 1997, when Entercom purchased KTHX from Susquehanna.

The move-in of 94.7 was completed on January 1, 1998, with the relaunch of the station as KSSJ. It assumed the smooth jazz format and call sign previously on 101.9 MHz, which was sold to Spanish-language radio company EXCL Communications.

=== Alternative rock: 2010-present ===
On March 3, 2010, the KSSJ website, as well as e-mails sent to station listeners, indicated that the format would change at noon that day. Management stated "the audience for the station can no longer sustain the business of the station".

At 12:01 p.m. on March 3, KSSJ switched to a gold-based alternative rock format, branded as "Radio 94-7". The call letters were also changed to KKDO. The first song on "Radio" was Smashing Pumpkins' "Today". This is a return to the alternative rock format for Sacramento after longtime alternative station and sister station KWOD flipped to all-90s music in 2009.

On April 6, 2018, KKDO rebranded as "Alt 94-7", this time adopting a more current-based Alternative presentation in line with Entercom's "Alt" branding. In September 2020, the station added DJs syndicated from other alternative stations across the country as part of a nationalization of the format by Entercom.

== KKDO-HD2 ==
On October 11, 2018, KKDO launched a dance/EDM format on its HD2 subchannel, branded as "Out Now". On November 1, 2018, the station rebranded as "Channel Q".

== Previous Logo ==
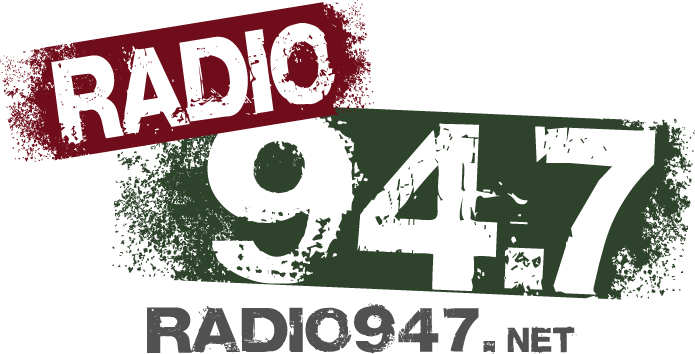
