= KSEG (FM) =

Classic rock radio station in Sacramento, California, United States

- Sacramento, California; United States
- Broadcast area: Sacramento metro area
- Frequency: 96.9 MHz (HD Radio)
- Branding: 96-9 The Eagle

Programming
- Language: English
- Format: Classic rock

Ownership
- Owner: Audacy, Inc.; (Audacy License, LLC)
- Sister stations: KIFM; KKDO; KRXQ; KSFM; KUDL

History
- First air date: October 2, 1959
- Former call signs: KSFM (1959–71); KPSC (1971–73); KEZS (1973–75); KROI (1975–79); KROY-FM (1979–84); KSAC (1984–85); KROY (1985–90)
- Call sign meaning: "Sacramento's Eagle"

Technical information
- Licensing authority: FCC
- Facility ID: 11281
- Class: B
- ERP: 50,000 watts
- HAAT: 152 meters (499 ft)
- Transmitter coordinates: 38.6480°N 121.4783°W

Links
- Public license information: Public file; LMS
- Webcast: Listen live (via Audacy)
- Website: www.audacy.com/eagle969

KSEG (96.9 MHz "The Eagle") is a commercial FM radio station in Sacramento, California. It airs a classic rock radio format and is owned by Audacy, Inc. The studios and offices are located on Lava Ridge Court in Roseville, California. KSEG is co-owned with five other Sacramento Audacy radio stations.

KSEG has an effective radiated power (ERP) of 50,000 watts. The transmitter is off North Market Boulevard in Sacramento, near Steelhead Creek. KSEG broadcasts in the HD Radio hybrid format.

== History ==
=== Classical: 1959-1971 ===
On October 2, 1959, after beginning testing the previous month, the station signed on. Its call sign was KSFM. It was owned by local radio personality Fred White and KXTV engineer Bob Stofan, doing business as the Audiolab Company. KSFM played classical music from studios and a transmitter site in Arden Town. In 1961, the station moved its studios and transmitter to a site on Rosebud Lane, increasing power from 6,400 to 64,000 watts.

KSFM went silent for 90 days on October 11, 1963, to permit a financial reorganization of the station. That December, a judge ordered the station to return $16,000 worth of equipment to the Collins Radio Company after not making monthly payments on its purchase. It was announced in August that the Belltone Music Company would assume operations of the silent station, with an affiliated background music service broadcast on its subcarrier.

This prompted a lawsuit from Dale Flewelling, founder of KXRQ (98.5 FM). Flewelling, who had bought KSFM's existing background music business in December 1962, charged that KSFM's reentry into that market violated a non-compete clause and sought an injunction to prevent such activity at KSFM until December 1965. The Flewelling lawsuit was dismissed in January 1965.

=== Beautiful music: 1971-1975 ===
In 1971, KSFM was acquired by PSA Broadcasting, a division of Pacific Southwest Airlines. While there were no changes in personnel as a result of the purchase, PSA changed the station to a beautiful music format, as its other stations had, and the call letters changed to KPSC. (The KSFM call letters were adopted by 102.5 FM in June 1972.) PSA chose call signs for its four stations in California with designations including the letters "EZ." KPSC thus became KEZS in 1973.

=== Rock: 1975-1984 ===
In 1975, Atlantic States Industries, owners of popular Top 40 station KROY 1240 AM, acquired KEZS. To echo its new sister station, the call letters were changed to KROI. KROY-KROI was acquired in 1978 by Jonsson Broadcasting Corporation, with the two stations fetching $1.65 million and $1.1 million, respectively. While separately programmed from the AM station as an album-oriented rock station, KROI became KROY-FM on April 23, 1979. Management believed the separate KROI designation confused advertisers used to the more familiar KROY call letters.

The rapid rise of KZAP after its 1978 sale to Western Cities Broadcasting gave KROY-FM a powerful rock competitor.

=== Adult contemporary: 1984-1985 ===
In 1984, KROY-FM became adult contemporary outlet KSAC, doing what a number of Sacramento radio stations had attempted to do but fail—secure the call letters that had belonged to the radio station of Kansas State University since the early days of radio. That station had been KSAC, since the university was known as Kansas State Agricultural College when it was founded. 1984 was its 60th anniversary, and the station's longtime desire to obtain call letters containing KSU, plus a $25,000 offer from the Sacramento station and FCC deregulation, helped secure the change.

Dick Tracy, radio columnist for the Sacramento Bee, questioned Jonsson's management of its Sacramento stations, noting that "long-range ineptitude" had caused listenership to its local stations to decline considerably. Jonsson moved its stations to new quarters in the American River Commons office park.

=== Hot adult contemporary: 1985-1990 ===
In 1985, Jonsson sold its two Sacramento radio stations to Commonwealth Broadcasting for $12 million. Commonwealth relaunched 96.9 FM as hot adult contemporary/contemporary hit radio KROY-FM (branded as "97 KROY"), restoring the call letters that Jonsson had moved to a station in Reno, and moved KSAC to 1240 AM. Ratings surged from a 2.2 to a 5.9 in 1987, coming close to beating KSFM (102.5 FM), which had led the market overall prior to the creation of 97 KROY.

In 1988, Great American Broadcasting acquired KROY for $11.8 million.

=== Classic rock: 1990-present ===
On November 12, 1990, KROY became KSEG, flipping from CHR to classic rock; the first song under the new format was "Fly Like an Eagle" by the Steve Miller Band. The move came as the CHR format was in a decline, and Sacramento had three stations in the format. The flip to classic rock put KZAP on notice and surpassed it in the ratings; ultimately, that station bowed out of the competition and flipped to country in January 1992.

KSEG attracted local attention in its early years for giving away condoms in an AIDS education campaign, while in 1993, Governor Pete Wilson took an air shift on its "Classic Nine at 9" program for his 60th birthday, taking KSEG up on a long-standing offer.

In 1993, Great American Broadcasting acquired rock outlet KRXQ (93.7 FM), which targeted a younger audience. After Jacor Communications acquired Great American, it sold both Sacramento stations to Entercom, which at the same time purchased KXOA-FM 107.9; the two Jacor pickups sold for $45 million. In the wake of the sale, KSEG dismissed its morning show team of Jeff McMurray and Mark Davis, ultimately replacing them with The Mark & Brian Show from Los Angeles. After the Mark & Brian show ended in 2012, KSEG has had multiple local DJs in the morning slot - including Charlie Thomas, Pat Martin, and Justin Case. Martin retired in 2021, after 33 years with KSEG. Outside of morning drive, all DJs on the station are pre-recorded from other markets.

KSEG was the Sacramento market affiliate for San Francisco 49ers game broadcasts, directly contracting with San Francisco station KGO for the rights. When the Niners changed flagships to KNBR ahead of the 2005 season, however, KSEG lost the rights alongside KGO and opted not to even pursue a new deal, citing KNBR's strong signal into Sacramento.
