= Audacy, Inc. =

American radio broadcasting company

- Formerly: Entercom Communications Corporation (1968–2021)
- Type: Private
- Traded as: OTC Pink: AUDAQ (2023–2024); NYSE: AUD (2021–2023); NYSE: ETM (1999–2021); Russell 2000 component (until 2023)
- Industry: Broadcasting
- Predecessors: Infinity Broadcasting Corporation; radio arm of Westinghouse Broadcasting; Jefferson-Pilot Communications; Lincoln Financial Media; CBS Radio; American Radio Systems
- Founded: October 21, 1968; 58 years ago
- Headquarters: New York City, U.S.
- Area served: United States
- Key people: Kelli Turner (President and CEO); Chris Oliviero (CBO); Bob Philips (CRO); Rick Rosenthal (CFO)
- Services: Radio broadcasting; Podcasting
- Revenue: ▲$1.463 billion (2018)
- Operating income: ▲$250 million (2018)
- Net income: ▼ -$361 million (2018)
- Subsidiaries: Cadence13; Eventful; Pineapple Street Media; Audacy
- Website: audacyinc.com

Audacy, Inc. is an American broadcasting company based in New York City. Founded in 1968 as Entercom Communications Corp., it is the second largest radio company in the United States, owning over 220 radio stations across 47 media markets.

In November 2017, the company merged with CBS Radio. The transaction was structured as an exchange offer whereby owners of CBS Corporation common shares (i.e., not the multiple-voting shares held by CBS Corp parent company National Amusements) at the time of the merger could elect to exchange their shares for Entercom shares corresponding to a 72% stake in the combined company. The company changed its name from Entercom to Audacy on March 30, 2021. On April 9, the ticker symbol on the New York Stock Exchange changed from "ETM" to "AUD".

Audacy, Inc. emerged from bankruptcy on September 30, 2024, and is now a privately owned company. The new ownership group includes Soros Fund Management (which has controlling interest) as part of their other audio investments.

== History ==
Final logo used under the Entercom brand

Joseph M. Field founded the company as Entertainment Communications (which would later be shortened to Entercom) on October 21, 1968, on the conviction that FM broadcasting, then in its infancy, would eventually surpass AM broadcasting as the leading radio broadcast band.

=== Acquisitions ===
During the 1990s, the Federal Communications Commission's regulations on the ownership of multiple radio stations were eased, beginning with the introduction of duopoly rules, which allowed a company to own two stations in each radio market. Entercom took advantage of the change to expand its presence in the markets where it already operated. In April 1995, the company paid $24.5 million for three stations in Portland, Oregon, acquiring KGON, a classic rock station; KFXX, an all-sports station; and KMUZ-FM, a modern rock station.

In January 1999, Entercom went public in an IPO in which it raised around $236 million. In July 1999, the company purchased 43 radio stations from Sinclair Broadcast Group for $821.5 million in cash. It was Entercom's largest deal under that name. The deal included stations in eight markets, Kansas City, Missouri; Milwaukee; New Orleans; Memphis, Tennessee; Buffalo, New York; Norfolk, Virginia; and Scranton/Wilkes-Barre, Pennsylvania. The deal more than doubled both the number of stations under the company's control, and the number of markets in which it had stations. The acquisition made Entercom the fifth-largest radio broadcaster in the United States, with 88 stations in 17 markets. That year, Entercom announced that it would direct its radio stations not to play songs that promoted violence.

On August 21, 2006, Entercom agreed to buy 15 mid-market stations from CBS Radio. Locations included Austin, Texas; Cincinnati; Memphis, Tennessee; and Rochester, New York. Due to ownership limitations set by the FCC, Entercom had to sell three of its stations in the Rochester market; these were acquired by Stephens Media Group. Shortly after the transaction, the company exited the Cincinnati market by trading all four of its stations in Cincinnati and three of its stations in Seattle in exchange for three stations in San Francisco in a deal with Bonneville International.

On December 8, 2014, Entercom announced its acquisition of Lincoln Financial Media for $105 million; the deal gave the company 14 additional stations in Atlanta; Denver; Miami; and San Diego. To comply with FCC ownership limits in the Denver market and DOJ antitrust concerns, Entercom entered into an exchange agreement with Bonneville under which Entercom exchanged four stations in Denver for classic rock station KSWD in Los Angeles and $5 million in additional consideration. The stations Entercom exchanged with Bonneville were KOSI-FM, KYGO-FM, KKFN-FM and KEPN-AM. Entercom previously owned KOSI-FM, while the remaining stations were acquired through the acquisition of LFM.

Entercom and Bonneville began operating the exchanged stations under time brokerage agreement (TBAs) once the LFM transaction was completed. In November 2015, the swap deal was closed successfully.

In October 2016, Entercom announced that it would acquire four radio stations in Charlotte, North Carolina, from Beasley Broadcast Group for $24 million in cash. The deal closed in January 2017 and WBT AM/FM, WLNK-FM and WFNZ-AM joined Entercom.

On August 3, 2017, Entercom announced the purchase of a 45% stake in Cadence13 (formerly DGital Media), a startup that handled ad sales and distribution for podcasts, including Pod Save America, Recode Decode and The Tony Kornheiser Show.

On February 13, 2019, Entercom announced that it would trade its Indianapolis cluster (WNTR, WXNT, and WZPL) to Cumulus Media for WNSH (now WXBK) in New York City, WMAS-FM in Enfield, Connecticut, and WHLL in Springfield, Massachusetts. Both companies began operating their newly acquired stations via LMA on March 1; the swap was completed on May 13, 2019.

In March 2021, Entercom acquired podcast ad network Podcorn in a deal valued at $22.5 million. The company also reached a long-term licensing agreement with Global Music Rights (GMR), allowing the company to perform all of the songs from songwriters and publishers represented by the performance rights organization.

=== Legal issues ===
In 2006, Entercom was investigated for payola and fined $4.45 million by the FCC. Then New York State Attorney General Eliot Spitzer also brought suit in the New York Supreme Court, before judge Ira Gammerman, which settled.

In 2007, Entercom station KDND was sued after a participant in a "Hold Your Wee For a Wii" contest held by the station's morning show died of water intoxication.

=== Merger with CBS Radio ===
On February 2, 2017, Entercom announced that it had agreed to merge with CBS Radio. The purchase will give Entercom operations in 23 of the top 25 markets, and make it the second-largest owner of radio stations in the US, behind iHeartMedia. Under the terms of the Reverse Morris Trust, the company would retain the Entercom name, board of directors and base of operations, but CBS shareholders would hold 72% of its stock. The company also shut down KDND in Sacramento and returned its license to the FCC, with its programming moved to sister station KUDL. The FCC had designated that the renewal of KDND's license would be subject to a hearing over allegations it had failed to operate in the public interest.

On September 26, 2017, KSOQ-FM, WGGI and KSWD were sold to the Educational Media Foundation. KSWD and WGGI affiliated with the EMF's K-Love Christian music network, and KSOQ with its Air1 network.

To comply with federal ownership caps, Entercom stated that it would divest at least 15 stations. On November 1, 2017, Entercom announced a settlement with the Department of Justice, which allowed the merger with CBS Radio. The company also announced a series of asset exchange agreements with iHeartMedia and Beasley Broadcast Group in Boston, Seattle, Richmond and Chattanooga; and local marketing agreements with Bonneville International Corporation in San Francisco and Sacramento.

Stations divested to iHeartMedia
Location	Owner	Station	Format
Boston	CBS Radio	WBZ (AM)	News
Boston	CBS Radio	WZLX	Classic Rock
Boston	Entercom	WKAF	Urban Adult Contemporary
Boston	Entercom	WRKO	News/Talk
Seattle	CBS Radio	KFNQ	Sports
Seattle	CBS Radio	KJAQ	Adult Hits
Seattle	CBS Radio	KZOK-FM	Classic Rock

iHeartMedia stations acquired by Entercom
Location	Station	Format
Chattanooga	WLND	Adult Hits
Chattanooga	WKXJ	Top 40
Chattanooga	WRXR-FM	Active Rock
Chattanooga	WUSY	Country
Richmond	WBTJ	Urban
Richmond	WRNL	Sports
Richmond	WRVA	News/Talk
Richmond	WRVQ	Top 40
Richmond	WRXL	Alternative Rock
Richmond	WTVR-FM	Adult Contemporary

Stations divested to Beasley
Location	Owner	Station	Format
Boston	CBS Radio	WBZ-FM	Sports

Beasley stations acquired by Entercom
Location	Station	Format
Boston	WMJX	Adult Contemporary

Stations operated by, and later sold to, Bonneville
Location	Owner	Station	Format
San Francisco	CBS Radio	KMVQ-FM	Top 40
San Francisco	Entercom	KBLX-FM	Urban Adult Contemporary
San Francisco	Entercom	KOIT	Adult Contemporary
San Francisco	Entercom	KUFX	Classic Rock
Sacramento	CBS Radio	KHTK	Sports
Sacramento	CBS Radio	KNCI	Country
Sacramento	CBS Radio	KYMX	Adult Contemporary
Sacramento	CBS Radio	KZZO	Hot Adult Contemporary

On November 9, 2017, the FCC gave the final approval needed for the Entercom merger by granting two 6-month waivers for market station limits in Miami and San Francisco. The merger occurred at midnight on November 17, 2017. Later that day, Entercom would switch WBMP in New York to alternative. This would then be followed up by WJMK in Chicago's switch to classic hip-hop and KVIL in Dallas-Ft. Worth's flip to alternative. The company also introduced a new corporate logo as well as other corporate strategy changes. The Entercom Divestiture Trust then entered into agreements with Bonneville International to operate its stations on their behalf.

Shortly afterward, the company announced renewed radio broadcasting partnerships with the Minnesota Twins and Philadelphia Eagles. The company also has partnerships with additional professional teams including the New York Yankees, Boston Red Sox, Dallas Cowboys and Detroit Red Wings.

On July 19, 2018, Entercom announced that it would acquire Philadelphia market-leader WBEB from Jerry Lee Radio for $57.5 million. WXTU was divested back to its previous owner, Beasley Broadcast Group, to comply with ownership limits.

On August 3, 2018, Entercom announced that Bonneville would buy all eight stations for $141 million, which the company had been operating under LMA since after the merger with CBS Radio. The deal was completed on September 21, 2018.

=== Radio.com ===
On June 25, 2018, Entercom announced that Radio.com would become the exclusive streaming portal for all of its stations, beginning with its legacy stations on July 6, and former CBS Radio stations beginning August 1, ending its relationship with the third-party service TuneIn. All Entercom properties were also branded on-air as "Proud to be a Radio.com station".

Following the termination of its deal with United States Traffic Network, Entercom launched an internal Traffic Weather and Information Network (TWIN) in August 2018.

In February 2019 Radio.com Sports was created, featuring appearances from experts on Entercom sports stations across the country. Mercedes-Benz was the first sponsor to sign on as a brand partner.

On August 19, 2019, Entercom launched the Radio.com Sports Digital Network, a collection of daily live audio and video programming from the company's sports stations. Later that month, Paul Suchman became the company's Chief Marketing Officer.

In September 2019, Entercom partnered with Apple to integrate access to Radio.com stations via Siri (on the iOS 13 update) and Apple Music. In November, it also released a capsule for Samsung Bixby.

Radio.com was relaunched as the Audacy app and website as part of the company's 2021 rebrand.

=== Developments ===
In May 2014, Entercom announced its launch of SmartReach Digital product line focused on creating digital marketing options for small and medium businesses.

Early in 2020, Entercom opened a HD Radio Sound Space in Los Angeles as an event space and home for future live events. The space was opened with a live performance from Coldplay.

In response to the COVID-19 pandemic, Entercom developed the Stay Connected programming that included "Heroes & Difference Makers," and "Love Local," and "I'm Listening: Stay Connected," a daily digital series on mental health hosted by "LOVELINE"'s Dr. Chris Donaghue.

In 2022, Audacy announced plans to open a new studio on Broadway in Nashville, as part of the company's partnership with Hard Rock International. The studio opened in September 2024.

In February 2023, Audacy released a ground-breaking study alongside research and analytics platform Veritonic that highlights how to make audio ads most effective.

In March 2024, Audacy introduced dynamic AI and machine learning into its Ad Tech stack to help brands more precisely target podcast consumers. This capability will allow advertising partners to target messages that are aligned with podcast content.

Audacy reorganized its programming operations around a "Content-First" model in January 2026, replacing market-based programming oversight with centralized format leadership. Brand managers began reporting directly to format vice presidents rather than local market leaders. Chief business officer Chris Oliviero was appointed to lead a consolidated Content Organization encompassing programming, podcasting, and product functions.

In April 2026, Audacy introduced a regionalized sales structure that eliminated the Market Manager position across its station clusters. Ten Regional Vice Presidents were appointed to oversee groups of markets, reporting to five Regional Presidents. The company also introduced Senior Vice President of Sales positions at the local-market level, with some existing market leaders assuming the roles.

=== Rebranding ===
On March 30, 2021, after more than 50 years as Entercom, the company rebranded as Audacy to clarify its position as a scaled multi-platform audio content and entertainment company. The Radio.com name was also rebranded as the Audacy app. On the same day, Audacy and BetMGM agreed to a multi-year deal designating the sports betting and gaming platform as the preferred sports betting partner with Audacy.

=== Emergence from bankruptcy ===
On May 16, 2023, Audacy was delisted from the New York Stock Exchange due to the company's common stock trading at an abnormally low share price. Audacy announced their intention to appeal the exchange's decision while seeking a reverse stock split from their shareholders to remedy the situation. However, in October 2023, Audacy's appeal was denied, and the NYSE continued to proceed in the process of delisting Audacy's stock, which became effective on November 10, 2023.

In early January 2024, it was announced that Audacy would be preparing to file for bankruptcy within the upcoming weeks. On January 7, 2024, Audacy filed for prepackaged Chapter 11 bankruptcy protection. As part of the bankruptcy reorganization, Audacy has made a deal with its creditors to transfer control to them while cutting approximately $1.6 billion of its debt.

On September 30, 2024, Audacy completed its financial restructuring, implementing a consensual, deleveraging transaction that equitized approximately $1.6 billion of funded debt, a reduction of 80% from approximately $1.9 billion to $350 million. The company emerged from bankruptcy with a total net leverage of approximately 2.7x, differentiated by its premium audio content.

David J. Field stepped down as president and chief executive officer on January 29, 2025, and the board appointed Kelli Turner, a member of the company's board, as interim president and CEO. On March 17, Turner was appointed to the position permanently. The company also appointed Chris Oliviero as chief business officer and Bob Philips as chief revenue officer.

=== TuneIn restoration ===
On June 21, 2023, Audacy and TuneIn reached a new agreement and restored access of its stations to TuneIn users after a near five-year absence.

== Partnerships ==
In April 2019, Entercom reached a distribution agreement with Waze, giving drivers the ability to access Radio.com's podcasts and on-demand audio content through Waze.

In September 2020 Clark Atlanta University partnered with Entercom, to give Mass Media Arts Students at the university access to company representatives in programming, sales, digital, and on-air talent.

On October 21, 2020, Entercom announced a partnership with the National Urban League to advance racial justice and equity in the communities they serve.

In 2020, Radio.com established partnerships with SoundHound Inc and Beasley Media Group.

Also in 2020, streaming platform Twitch added the video feeds from a number of Radio.com's sports stations with branded channels and GM added Radio.com to its in-dash application in Chevrolet, GMC, Buick, and Cadillac vehicles.

We Can Do Hard Things, a twice-weekly podcast hosted by #1 New York Times bestselling author Glennon Doyle, her wife Abby Wambach, and her sister Amanda Doyle joined Audacy in May 2021. In its first year, it was the #1 top new show on Apple Podcasts.

In August 2021, Audacy announced a content distribution partnership with Urban One to bring premium live and on-demand audio content to the Audacy digital platform. The company announced a similar deal with Cumulus that same year.

Audacy acquired an exclusive, perpetual license to WideOrbit's digital audio streaming technology, related assets and operations of WO Streaming in October 2021. Audacy now operates WO Streaming under the name AmperWave.

In December 2021, Audacy announced a multi-faceted partnership with Hard Rock International. As part of the deal, Audacy and HRI partner on live events at a new performance space in New York City, as well as music festivals and Hard Rock Cafe events around the country.

In January 2022, Audacy announced a content distribution partnership with Samsung that made Audacy's entire podcast library available on Samsung platforms. That same month, Audacy partnered with Dana Carvey and David Spade for Fly on the Wall, a weekly Saturday Night Live-focused podcast. In February 2024, Audacy launched a weekly extension of the show called Superfly.

In August 2022, Audacy and CBS Sports Digital announced a partnership where Audacy will be the exclusive, multi-year ad sales and distribution partner for CBS Sports' leading network of award-winning sports podcasts.

In May 2023, Audacy announced a content distribution partnership with Allen Media Group. Through this new partnership, Audacy launched three new audio streams dedicated to three Allen Media Group weather and climate news networks: The Weather Channel television network, Pattrn and The Weather Channel en Español.

In September 2023, Audacy announced a content distribution partnership with Spanish Broadcasting System (SBS) that will bring SBS' complete portfolio of 13 stations to the Audacy app.

In September 2023, Audacy partnered with Amy Poehler's Paper Kite Productions for a three-season improvised comedy podcast franchise parodying and paying homage to popular themes in the podcast space including Say More with Dr? Sheila starring Poehler as a fictional therapist with questionable methods and credentials counseling a new couple every week.

In November 2023, HBO's Succession Podcast, created by Audacy's Pineapple Street Studios, won Adweek's Podcast of the Year award.

In December 2023, Audacy and CBS stations announced a content distribution partnership that made audio simulcasts of the television news streams from 14 CBS-owned stations available on the Audacy app.

In February 2024, Audacy announced a content distribution partnership with internet radio network Live365. As part of the partnership, content from hundreds of Live365 stations spanning multiple genres became available on the Audacy platform.

In March 2024, Audacy partnered with Super Hi-Fi, the leader in AI-powered radio services for broadcast and digital media companies. Super Hi-Fi would equip Audacy's portfolio of more than 700 exclusive stations with HLS+ technology, which merges live, linear radio broadcasting with elements of interactivity and personalization within a single audio stream. The two companies later announced an expanded partnership to streamline Audacy's digital content production and broadcasting processes while creating stickier listener environments and more opportunities for advertisers to engage with them.

In April 2024, Audacy announced a partnership with voice AI company ElevenLabs.

In July 2024, Audacy Podcasts partnered with Jenna Fischer and Angela Kinsey to handle sales, distribution, and production for their series, "Office Ladies".

In October 2024, Audacy partnered with Experian to track audience data and gain a more comprehensive view of listeners' digital identifiers. By better understanding its consumers and their preferences, the company can provide more relevant content and offer more precise advertising solutions.

In June 2025, Audacy partnered with IHeartMedia, sharing its Audacy's radio stations & podcasts with IHeartRadio.

In January 2026, Audacy partnered with Podscribe to enable attribution across most of Audacy's digital portfolio, including streaming audio, podcasting, CTV, and display, with client-facing dashboards and API access that support automated reporting and portfolio-level insights. The deeper integration is expected to not only streamline operational workflows but empower advertisers to make more informed decisions. The end goal is to drive greater investment in audio advertising.

In February 2026, Audacy partnered with Sonos to create alliances with "high-performing brands that deepen listener engagement and expand advertiser opportunities. This will allow access to advanced ad-decisioning, programmatic connectivity, and a proven framework for maximizing sell-through rates and premium CPMs. The partnership will be powered by Audacy Digital Audience Network (ADAN) and Audacy's AmperWave platform.

== Businesses ==
=== Radio ===
On March 30, 2021, Entercom rebranded as Audacy. With this rebranding, all Audacy stations are identified at the top of each hour as "An Audacy station." Or "Always Live On the Free Audacy App".

In July 2023, Audacy announced Launch, a music discovery program designed to spotlight emerging artists. Through broadcast and digital airplay, on-air artist vignettes, digital editorial and social content, Audacy introduces new artists to its millions of listeners and followers. The program commenced with three Launch Artists: Jelly Roll, Warren Zeiders and Doechii.

In May 2024, Audacy announced "On The Record," a new album release initiative for the biggest stars in music.

=== Digital ===
==== Audacy app (formerly Radio.com) ====
As part of the company's merger with CBS Radio, Entercom acquired Radio.com, Eventful, and play.it.

The Audacy app, formerly known as Radio.com, is an integrated digital platform offering over 230 locally programmed radio stations and their websites. Audacy currently has over 1,000 stations from more than 100 markets

On April 23, 2020, Radio.com streams were added to Sonos Radio, available in over 10 million homes globally. A week later, Radio.com was added to Comcast televisions.

The entire lineup of Locked On podcasts was added to Radio.com on February 10, 2021, following a content distribution partnership.

The Radio.com app became the Audacy app when the company rebranded on March 30, 2021.

In March 2022, The Audacy Digital Audience Network (ADAN) launched. This addressable aggregate of over 60 million listeners that other audio platforms and streaming platforms do not reach targets precise audiences at scale and delivers digital audio media strategies for Audacy's advertising partners.

In June 2023, Audacy extended digital distribution of its 250+ stations and entire podcast library to TuneIn. The deal expanded content availability to over 200 additional platforms and connected vehicles and devices, including Tesla, Rivian, Lucid, Bose, Samsung and Xbox, as well as on the TuneIn mobile app and TuneIn.com.

=== Podcast ===
Audacy's podcast portfolio includes more than 300 shows. In August 2025, the company's Head of Podcasts, Leah Reis-Dennis, described its operating model as a "network of networks," incorporating partnerships with outside media organizations including CBS, Tenderfoot TV, and PAVE Studios.

In 2019, Entercom announced its acquisition of Pineapple Street Media, a podcast producer, and the remaining portion of Cadence13. In 2021, Entercom acquired podcast ad network Podcorn, a deal valued at $22.5 million.

In March 2024, Audacy began to consolidate its podcast business under the new name Audacy Podcasts. The company sunsetted Cadence13 and 2400Sports as standalone, branded studios. Pineapple Street Studios remained as Audacy's premium production studio for third-party partners: HBO, Netflix, Nike, Amazon Music/Wondery, and Spotify.

==== Cadence13 ====
Cadence13, a division of Audacy, is a former podcast studio based out of New York City. David Landau, Spencer Brown and Chris Corcoran founded Cadence13 as DGital Media alongside Michael Rolnick, a venture capitalist, in 2015. In 2017, Entercom purchased a 45 percent stake in DGital Media for $9.7 million and the company changed its name to Cadence13. The company produced podcasts for Pulitzer Prize-winning historian and author Jon Meacham and NBA star Kevin Durant. The brand was sunset as a standalone studio brand as part of consolidation efforts in March 2024.

==== Pineapple Street Studios ====
Pineapple Street Studios is a podcast studio based in Brooklyn, New York. Originally named Pineapple Street Media, the company was founded in 2016 by former BuzzFeed head of audio Jenna Weiss-Berman and Longform co-founder Max Linsky. In August 2019, Pineapple Street was acquired by Entercom and renamed Pineapple Street Studios.

On June 26, 2025, Audacy announced the shutdown of Pineapple Street Studios. Approximately 30 employees were affected by the closure. Audacy continued producing selected Pineapple Street series through its Audacy Podcasts division, including The Severance Podcast, which Audacy Podcasts took over in collaboration with Red Hour and Great Scott.

==== Podcorn ====
Podcorn facilitates podcast ad campaigns and enables direct podcasters and advertisers to have direct relationships. Using algorithms, it matches podcasters to the most relevant brands.

The platform was founded by Agnes Kozera and David Kierzkowski following the acquisition by Google of their previous company FameBit, the leading marketplace for video influencers where brands and YouTube stars collaborated for branded content.

=== Sports ===
In April 2024, Audacy unveiled Audacy Sports, a new vertical representing the Company's portfolio of 40 owned-and-operated all-sports stations and affiliates, 160 sports streaming channels on the Audacy app, and the No 1. sports podcast network featuring over 600 titles and live events. Audacy Sports also serves as the home to 150 professional and collegiate teams including play-by-play broadcasts, and produces two national multiplatform sports networks, both distributed in partnership with Westwood One: Infinity Sports Network (formerly known as CBS Sports Radio) with over 300 U.S. affiliates and BetQL Network. Audacy Sports serves as the official audio and podcast partner of Major League Baseball, granting exclusive access to inventory for streaming audio play-by-play in both English and Spanish and official podcasts for the league.

=== Sports betting ===
On September 3, 2019, Entercom's RADIO.COM Sports signed a content distribution partnership with sports betting content platform The Action Network that will include updates on Entercom Sports format stations and podcasts on RADIO.COM.

In late 2020, Entercom expanded into sports betting with a six-year partnership to make FanDuel its official sportsbook. As part of the deal, FanDuel promotions and betting odds would be aired on Entercom stations. The gaming brand would also have access to Entercom talent in markets where both companies operate.

Just weeks after announcing a partnership with FanDuel, Entercom acquired sports data and iGaming affiliate platform QL Gaming Group in an all-cash deal for approximately $32 million. Following the acquisition of QL Gaming Group, Entercom launched "BetQL Network" on RADIO.COM on January 25, 2021. The network serves as home for the company's sports betting content from its sports stations nationwide and is currently available over-the-air in several markets nationwide and digitally via the Audacy app.

In March 2021, Entercom and Rush Street Interactive (RSI) reached a multi-year partnership surrounding several sports betting audio initiatives. As part of this agreement, BetRivers, RSI's flagship brand and online sportsbook, will be the official title sponsor of Radio.com's You Better You Bet podcast.

In June 2022, BetMGM became the exclusive sportsbook of BetQL Network.

=== Corporate social responsibility ===
On Suicide Prevention Day in 2017 Entercom launched "I'm Listening," a program dedicated to ending the stigma of talking about Mental Health.

In September 2018, Entercom's social responsibility platform Entercom Serves began in order to focus on important issues in the communities the company serves including children's health, diversity, civic education, the environment, mental health and the military community. Later that year, Entercom launched CHANNEL Q, an LGBTQ+ Talk Radio Network providing LGBTQ+ news and information, pop culture and new music.

Each year, Audacy conducts volunteer events nationwide as part of its 1Day1Thing initiative. The series of events engage employees across the company and aim to make a positive impact on the communities in which the company serves and the planet.

=== Live experiences ===
Each year, Audacy operates many live events, including We Can Survive, Leading Ladies, Almost Acoustic Christmas, Riptide and Stars & Strings in various cities throughout the country.
