= List of FM radio stations in the United States by call sign (initial letters KG–KJ) =

This is a list of FM radio stations in the United States having call signs beginning with the letters KG through KJ. Low-power FM radio stations, those with designations such as KGAP-LP, have not been included in this list.

== KG-- ==
Callsign	Frequency	City of license
KGAC	91.5 FM	Saint Peter, Minnesota
KGAM	106.3 FM	Merced, California
KGAS-FM	104.3 FM	Carthage, Texas
KGAY-FM	103.1 FM	Palm Desert, California
KGB-FM	101.5 FM	San Diego, California
KGBA-FM	100.1 FM	Holtville, California
KGBB	103.9 FM	Edwards, California
KGBI-FM	100.7 FM	Omaha, Nebraska
KGBK	98.9 FM	Larned, Kansas
KGBL	100.9 FM	Lakin, Kansas
KGBR	92.7 FM	Gold Beach, Oregon
KGBT-FM	98.5 FM	McAllen, Texas
KGBV	90.7 FM	Hardin, Texas
KGBX-FM	105.9 FM	Nixa, Missouri
KGCC	99.9 FM	Gillette, Wyoming
KGCD	90.3 FM	Wray, Colorado
KGCL	90.9 FM	Jordan Valley, Oregon
KGCM	90.9 FM	Three Forks, Montana
KGCN	91.7 FM	Roswell, New Mexico
KGCR	107.7 FM	Goodland, Kansas
KGCX	93.1 FM	Sidney, Montana
KGCY	89.1 FM	Cheyenne Wells, Colorado
KGDL	92.1 FM	Trent, Texas
KGDN	93.9 FM	Ephrata, Washington
KGDP-FM	90.5 FM	Santa Maria, California
KGEN-FM	94.5 FM	Hanford, California
KGFA	90.7 FM	Great Falls, Montana
KGFC	88.9 FM	Great Falls, Montana
KGFJ	88.1 FM	Belt, Montana
KGFM	101.5 FM	Bakersfield, California
KGFN	89.1 FM	Goldfield, Nevada
KGFT	100.7 FM	Pueblo, Colorado
KGFX-FM	92.7 FM	Pierre, South Dakota
KGFY	105.5 FM	Stillwater, Oklahoma
KGFZ	97.7 FM	Burke, Texas
KGGA	88.1 FM	Gallup, New Mexico
KGGB	96.3 FM	Yorktown, Texas
KGGF-FM	104.1 FM	Fredonia, Kansas
KGGI	99.1 FM	Riverside, California
KGGL	93.3 FM	Missoula, Montana
KGGM	93.9 FM	Delhi, Louisiana
KGGN	102.5 FM	Hemet, California
KGGO	94.9 FM	Des Moines, Iowa
KGHE	89.1 FM	Montesano, Washington
KGHF	99.7 FM	Belle Plaine, Kansas
KGHI	91.5 FM	Westport, Washington
KGHP	89.9 FM	Gig Harbor, Washington
KGHR	91.3 FM	Tuba City, Arizona
KGHT	100.5 FM	El Jebel, Colorado
KGHW	90.7 FM	Onida, South Dakota
KGHY	88.5 FM	Beaumont, Texas
KGID	96.3 FM	Giddings, Texas
KGIF	88.1 FM	Tafuna, American Samoa
KGIM-FM	103.7 FM	Redfield, South Dakota
KGJX	101.5 FM	Fruita, Colorado
KGKD	90.5 FM	Columbus, Nebraska
KGKL-FM	97.5 FM	San Angelo, Texas
KGKS	93.9 FM	Scott City, Missouri
KGKV	88.1 FM	Doss, Texas
KGLC	100.9 FM	Miami, Oklahoma
KGLI	95.5 FM	Sioux City, Iowa
KGLK	107.5 FM	Lake Jackson, Texas
KGLL	88.1 FM	Gillette, Wyoming
KGLM-FM	97.7 FM	Anaconda, Montana
KGLP	91.7 FM	Gallup, New Mexico
KGLT	91.9 FM	Bozeman, Montana
KGLV	88.9 FM	Manhattan, Kansas
KGLX	99.1 FM	Gallup, New Mexico
KGLY	91.3 FM	Tyler, Texas
KGLZ	89.1 FM	East Helena, Montana
KGMN	100.1 FM	Kingman, Arizona
KGMO	100.7 FM	Cape Girardeau, Missouri
KGMX	106.3 FM	Lancaster, California
KGMZ-FM	95.7 FM	San Francisco, California
KGNA-FM	89.9 FM	Arnold, Missouri
KGNC-FM	97.9 FM	Amarillo, Texas
KGNI	88.7 FM	Gunnison, Colorado
KGNN	97.5 FM	Dewey-Humboldt, Arizona
KGNR	91.9 FM	John Day, Oregon
KGNT	103.9 FM	Smithfield, Utah
KGNU-FM	88.5 FM	Boulder, Colorado
KGNV	89.9 FM	Washington, Missouri
KGNX	89.7 FM	Ballwin, Missouri
KGNZ	88.1 FM	Abilene, Texas
KGOH	89.1 FM	Colby, Kansas
KGON	92.3 FM	Portland, Oregon
KGOR	99.9 FM	Omaha, Nebraska
KGOT	101.3 FM	Anchorage, Alaska
KGOU	106.3 FM	Norman, Oklahoma
KGOZ	101.7 FM	Gallatin, Missouri
KGPF	91.1 FM	Sulphur Springs, Texas
KGPQ	99.9 FM	Monticello, Arkansas
KGPR	89.9 FM	Great Falls, Montana
KGRA	98.9 FM	Jefferson, Iowa
KGRB	94.3 FM	Jackson, California
KGRC	92.9 FM	Hannibal, Missouri
KGRD	105.3 FM	Orchard, Nebraska
KGRE-FM	102.1 FM	Estes Park, Colorado
KGRG-FM	89.9 FM	Auburn, Washington
KGRH	88.1 FM	Loomis, South Dakota
KGRI	88.1 FM	Lebanon, Oregon
KGRJ	89.9 FM	Chamberlain, South Dakota
KGRK	98.5 FM	Glenrock, Wyoming
KGRM	91.5 FM	Grambling, Louisiana
KGRP	89.7 FM	Grand Rapids, Minnesota
KGRR	97.3 FM	Epworth, Iowa
KGRS	107.3 FM	Burlington, Iowa
KGRT-FM	103.9 FM	Las Cruces, New Mexico
KGRU	89.5 FM	Burwell, Nebraska
KGRW	94.7 FM	Friona, Texas
KGSF	88.7 FM	Huntsville, Arkansas
KGSL	95.3 FM	Winona, Minnesota
KGSP	90.3 FM	Parkville, Missouri
KGSR	93.3 FM	Cedar Park, Texas
KGSY	88.3 FM	McCall, Idaho
KGTM	98.1 FM	Shelley, Idaho
KGTS	91.3 FM	College Place, Washington
KGTW	106.7 FM	Ketchikan, Alaska
KGU-FM	99.5 FM	Honolulu, Hawaii
KGUA	88.3 FM	Gualala, California
KGUD	90.7 FM	Longmont, Colorado
KGUM-FM	105.1 FM	Dededo, Guam
KGUY	91.3 FM	Guymon, Oklahoma
KGVA	88.1 FM	Fort Belknap Agency, Montana
KGVE	99.3 FM	Grove, Oklahoma
KGVI-FM	89.5 FM	Grangeville, Idaho
KGVM	95.9 FM	Bozeman, Montana
KGVV	90.5 FM	Goltry, Oklahoma
KGWB	91.1 FM	Snyder, Texas
KGWD	94.5 FM	Sioux Falls, South Dakota
KGWO	89.5 FM	Ogallala, Nebraska
KGWP	91.1 FM	Pittsburg, Texas
KGWT	93.5 FM	George West, Texas
KGWY	100.7 FM	Gillette, Wyoming
KGXL	103.5 FM	Taylor, Arizona
KGXX	100.7 FM	Susanville, California
KGYA	90.5 FM	Grayling, Alaska
KGZO	90.9 FM	Shafter, California

== KH-- ==
Callsign	Frequency	City of license
KHAK	98.1 FM	Cedar Rapids, Iowa
KHAM	103.1 FM	Britt, Iowa
KHAP	89.1 FM	Chico, California
KHAQ	98.5 FM	Maxwell, Nebraska
KHAV	107.1 FM	Sabinal, Texas
KHAY	100.7 FM	Ventura, California
KHAZ	99.5 FM	Hays, Kansas
KHBC	92.7 FM	Hilo, Hawaii
KHBE	102.1 FM	Big Wells, Texas
KHBM-FM	93.7 FM	Monticello, Arkansas
KHBT	97.7 FM	Humboldt, Iowa
KHBW	91.7 FM	Brownwood, Texas
KHBZ	102.9 FM	Harrison, Arkansas
KHCA	95.3 FM	Wamego, Kansas
KHCB-FM	105.7 FM	Houston, Texas
KHCC-FM	90.1 FM	Hutchinson, Kansas
KHCD	89.5 FM	Salina, Kansas
KHCF	89.9 FM	Morgan Hill, California
KHCJ	91.9 FM	Jefferson, Texas
KHCK	91.3 FM	Houck, Arizona
KHCL	92.5 FM	Arcadia, Louisiana
KHCM-FM	97.5 FM	Honolulu, Hawaii
KHCO	90.1 FM	Hayden, Colorado
KHCP	89.3 FM	Paris, Texas
KHCR	99.5 FM	Bismarck, Missouri
KHCS	91.7 FM	Palm Desert, California
KHCT	90.9 FM	Great Bend, Kansas
KHCU	93.1 FM	Concan, Texas
KHCV	104.3 FM	Mecca, California
KHCX	90.9 FM	Homer, Alaska
KHDC	90.9 FM	Chualar, California
KHDK	97.3 FM	New London, Iowa
KHDL	99.5 FM	Americus, Kansas
KHDR	96.9 FM	Lenwood, California
KHDV	107.9 FM	Darby, Montana
KHDX	93.1 FM	Conway, Arkansas
KHDY-FM	98.5 FM	Clarksville, Texas
KHEC	91.1 FM	Crescent City, California
KHEI-FM	107.5 FM	Kihei, Hawaii
KHEM	89.3 FM	Zapata, Texas
KHER	94.3 FM	Crystal City, Texas
KHEV	90.3 FM	Fairview, Oklahoma
KHEW	88.5 FM	Rocky Boy's Reservation, Montana
KHEX	100.3 FM	Concow, California
KHEY-FM	96.3 FM	El Paso, Texas
KHFI-FM	96.7 FM	Georgetown, Texas
KHFM	95.5 FM	Santa Fe, New Mexico
KHFZ	103.1 FM	Pittsburg, Texas
KHGC	98.5 FM	Montana City, Montana
KHGE	102.7 FM	Fresno, California
KHGG-FM	103.5 FM	Mansfield, Arkansas
KHGN	106.7 FM	Hugoton, Kansas
KHGQ	101.7 FM	Shungnak, Alaska
KHHK	99.7 FM	Yakima, Washington
KHHM	101.9 FM	Shingle Springs, California
KHHS	104.5 FM	Pearcy, Arkansas
KHHT	98.9 FM	Mettler, California
KHHZ	97.7 FM	Gridley, California
KHIB	88.5 FM	Bastrop, Texas
KHIC	98.5 FM	Keno, Oregon
KHID	88.1 FM	McAllen, Texas
KHIH	99.9 FM	Liberty, Texas
KHII	88.9 FM	Cloudcroft, New Mexico
KHIM	97.7 FM	Mangum, Oklahoma
KHIP	104.3 FM	Gonzales, California
KHIS	89.9 FM	Jackson, Missouri
KHIT-FM	107.1 FM	Madera, California
KHIX	96.7 FM	Carlin, Nevada
KHJC	88.9 FM	Lihue, Hawaii
KHJK	103.7 FM	La Porte, Texas
KHJM	89.1 FM	Dexter, Missouri
KHJR	88.1 FM	St. Thomas, Missouri
KHKC-FM	102.1 FM	Atoka, Oklahoma
KHKE	89.5 FM	Cedar Falls, Iowa
KHKF	92.9 FM	Island City, Oregon
KHKI	97.3 FM	Des Moines, Iowa
KHKK	104.1 FM	Modesto, California
KHKL	91.9 FM	Laytonville, California
KHKM	98.7 FM	Hamilton, Montana
KHKN	94.9 FM	Maumelle, Arkansas
KHKO	102.9 FM	Prairie City, Oregon
KHKS	106.1 FM	Denton, Texas
KHKU	94.3 FM	Hanapepe, Hawaii
KHKV	91.1 FM	Kerrville, Texas
KHKX	99.1 FM	Odessa, Texas
KHKY	92.7 FM	Akiachak, Alaska
KHKZ	106.3 FM	San Benito, Texas
KHLA	92.9 FM	Jennings, Louisiana
KHLB	102.5 FM	Mason, Texas
KHLK	104.3 FM	Brownfield, Texas
KHLL	100.9 FM	Richwood, Louisiana
KHLR	91.9 FM	Harrison, Arkansas
KHLS	96.3 FM	Blytheville, Arkansas
KHLV	90.1 FM	Helena, Montana
KHLW	89.3 FM	Tabor, Iowa
KHMB	99.5 FM	Hamburg, Arkansas
KHMC	95.9 FM	Goliad, Texas
KHMD	104.7 FM	Mansfield, Louisiana
KHMG	88.1 FM	Barrigada, Guam
KHMJ	95.1 FM	Trona, California
KHML	91.5 FM	Madisonville, Texas
KHMR	104.3 FM	Lovelady, Texas
KHMS	88.5 FM	Victorville, California
KHMU	100.9 FM	Buttonwillow, California
KHMX	96.5 FM	Houston, Texas
KHMY	93.1 FM	Pratt, Kansas
KHMZ	94.9 FM	Snyder, Texas
KHNE-FM	89.1 FM	Hastings, Nebraska
KHNS	102.3 FM	Haines, Alaska
KHNW	88.3 FM	Manson, Washington
KHNZ	101.3 FM	Lefors, Texas
KHOC	102.5 FM	Casper, Wyoming
KHOE	90.5 FM	Fairfield, Iowa
KHOI	89.1 FM	Story City, Iowa
KHOK	100.7 FM	Hoisington, Kansas
KHOL	89.1 FM	Jackson, Wyoming
KHOM	100.9 FM	Salem, Arkansas
KHOO	90.7 FM	Hoonah, Alaska
KHOP	95.1 FM	Oakdale, California
KHOS-FM	92.1 FM	Sonora, Texas
KHOT-FM	105.9 FM	Paradise Valley, Arizona
KHOV-FM	105.1 FM	Wickenburg, Arizona
KHOY	88.1 FM	Laredo, Texas
KHPA	104.9 FM	Hope, Arkansas
KHPE	107.9 FM	Albany, Oregon
KHPH	88.7 FM	Kailua, Hawaii
KHPO	91.9 FM	Port O'Connor, Texas
KHPQ	92.1 FM	Clinton, Arkansas
KHPR	88.1 FM	Honolulu, Hawaii
KHPS	88.9 FM	Uvalde, Texas
KHPT	106.9 FM	Conroe, Texas
KHQT	103.1 FM	Las Cruces, New Mexico
KHRD	103.1 FM	Weaverville, California
KHRI	90.7 FM	Hollister, California
KHRK	97.7 FM	Hennessey, Oklahoma
KHRM	90.3 FM	Round Mountain, Nevada
KHRQ	94.9 FM	Baker, California
KHRT-FM	106.9 FM	Minot, North Dakota
KHRV	90.1 FM	Hood River, Oregon
KHRW	92.7 FM	Ranchester, Wyoming
KHSB-FM	104.7 FM	Kingsland, Texas
KHSF	90.1 FM	Ferndale, California
KHSG	89.9 FM	Garberville, California
KHSK	93.3 FM	Emmonak, Alaska
KHSL-FM	103.5 FM	Paradise, California
KHSM	103.3 FM	McKinleyville, California
KHSQ	107.7 FM	Trinidad, California
KHSR	91.9 FM	Crescent City, California
KHSS	100.7 FM	Walla Walla, Washington
KHST	101.7 FM	Lamar, Missouri
KHSU	90.5 FM	Arcata, California
KHTA	92.5 FM	Wake Village, Texas
KHTB	101.9 FM	Ogden, Utah
KHTE-FM	96.5 FM	England, Arkansas
KHTH	101.7 FM	Santa Rosa, California
KHTI	103.9 FM	Lake Arrowhead, California
KHTN	104.7 FM	Planada, California
KHTP	103.7 FM	Tacoma, Washington
KHTQ	94.5 FM	Hayden, Idaho
KHTR	104.3 FM	Pullman, Washington
KHTS-FM	93.3 FM	El Cajon, California
KHTT	106.9 FM	Muskogee, Oklahoma
KHTU	88.1 FM	Wray, Colorado
KHUD	92.9 FM	Tucson, Arizona
KHUI	89.1 FM	Alamosa, Colorado
KHUK	106.5 FM	Granite Shoals, Texas
KHUM	104.7 FM	Cutten, California
KHUS	98.1 FM	Huslia, Alaska
KHUT	102.9 FM	Hutchinson, Kansas
KHUU	97.1 FM	Hughes, Alaska
KHVT	91.5 FM	Bloomington, Texas
KHVU	91.7 FM	Houston, Texas
KHWA	102.3 FM	Weed, California
KHWG-FM	100.1 FM	Crystal, Nevada
KHWI	92.7 FM	Holualoa, Hawaii
KHWL	98.7 FM	Lone Wolf, Oklahoma
KHWY	98.9 FM	Essex, California
KHXS	102.7 FM	Merkel, Texas
KHXT	107.9 FM	Erath, Louisiana
KHYC	91.5 FM	Scott City, Kansas
KHYG-FM	91.1 FM	Hydaburg, Alaska
KHYI	95.3 FM	Howe, Texas
KHYL	101.1 FM	Auburn, California
KHYM	103.9 FM	Copeland, Kansas
KHYS	89.7 FM	Hays, Kansas
KHYT	107.5 FM	Tucson, Arizona
KHYX	102.7 FM	Winnemucca, Nevada
KHYY	107.3 FM	Minatare, Nebraska
KHYZ	99.7 FM	Mountain Pass, California
KHZY	99.3 FM	Overton, Nebraska

== KI-- ==
Callsign	Frequency	City of license
KIAD	88.5 FM	Dubuque, Iowa
KIAI	93.9 FM	Mason City, Iowa
KIAK-FM	102.5 FM	Fairbanks, Alaska
KIAM-FM	91.9 FM	North Nenana, Alaska
KIAN	91.9 FM	Kiana, Alaska
KIAO	90.3 FM	Delta Junction, Alaska
KIAQ	96.9 FM	Clarion, Iowa
KIBC	90.5 FM	Burney, California
KIBE	104.9 FM	Broken Bow, Oklahoma
KIBG	100.7 FM	Wallace, Idaho
KIBH-FM	91.7 FM	Seward, Alaska
KIBQ	105.9 FM	Austwell, Texas
KIBR	102.5 FM	Sandpoint, Idaho
KIBS	100.7 FM	Bishop, California
KIBT	96.1 FM	Fountain, Colorado
KIBX	92.1 FM	Bonners Ferry, Idaho
KIBZ	104.1 FM	Crete, Nebraska
KICB	88.1 FM	Fort Dodge, Iowa
KICD-FM	107.7 FM	Spencer, Iowa
KICG	91.7 FM	Perry, Iowa
KICK-FM	97.9 FM	Palmyra, Missouri
KICL	96.3 FM	Pleasantville, Iowa
KICM	97.7 FM	Healdton, Oklahoma
KICO	89.5 FM	Rico, Colorado
KICP	105.9 FM	Patterson, Iowa
KICR	102.3 FM	Coeur D'alene, Idaho
KICT-FM	95.1 FM	Wichita, Kansas
KICW	91.1 FM	Ottumwa, Iowa
KICX-FM	96.1 FM	McCook, Nebraska
KICY-FM	100.3 FM	Nome, Alaska
KIDD	103.9 FM	Fort Mohave, Arizona
KIDE	91.3 FM	Hoopa, California
KIDG	92.1 FM	Pocatello, Idaho
KIDI-FM	105.1 FM	Lompoc, California
KIDJ	106.3 FM	Sugar City, Idaho
KIDN-FM	95.9 FM	Hayden, Colorado
KIDS	88.1 FM	Grants, New Mexico
KIDX	101.5 FM	Ruidoso, New Mexico
KIEA	91.9 FM	Selawik, Alaska
KIEE	88.3 FM	St. Martinville, Louisiana
KIEL	89.3 FM	Loyal, Oklahoma
KIFG-FM	95.3 FM	Iowa Falls, Iowa
KIFS	107.5 FM	Ashland, Oregon
KIFT	106.3 FM	Kremmling, Colorado
KIFX	98.5 FM	Naples, Utah
KIGG	103.3 FM	Igiugig, Alaska
KIGI	106.9 FM	Igiugig, Alaska
KIGL	93.3 FM	Seligman, Missouri
KIGN	101.9 FM	Burns, Wyoming
KIHC-FM	105.3 FM	Chariton, Iowa
KIHK	106.9 FM	Rock Valley, Iowa
KIHT	104.7 FM	Amboy, California
KIIC	96.7 FM	Albia, Iowa
KIIK-FM	104.9 FM	De Witt, Iowa
KIIM-FM	99.5 FM	Tucson, Arizona
KIIS-FM	102.7 FM	Los Angeles
KIIZ-FM	92.3 FM	Killeen, Texas
KIJI	104.3 FM	Tumon, Guam
KIJN-FM	92.3 FM	Farwell, Texas
KIKC-FM	101.3 FM	Forsyth, Montana
KIKD	106.7 FM	Lake City, Iowa
KIKF	104.9 FM	Cascade, Montana
KIKL	90.9 FM	Lafayette, Louisiana
KIKN-FM	100.5 FM	Salem, South Dakota
KIKO-FM	96.5 FM	Claypool, Arizona
KIKS-FM	101.5 FM	Iola, Kansas
KIKT	93.5 FM	Cooper, Texas
KIKV-FM	100.7 FM	Sauk Centre, Minnesota
KIKX	104.7 FM	Ketchum, Idaho
KILI	90.1 FM	Porcupine, South Dakota
KILJ-FM	105.5 FM	Mount Pleasant, Iowa
KILO	94.3 FM	Colorado Springs, Colorado
KILR-FM	95.9 FM	Estherville, Iowa
KILT-FM	100.3 FM	Houston, Texas
KILV	107.5 FM	Castana, Iowa
KILX	102.1 FM	De Queen, Arkansas
KIMB	104.3 FM	Dix, Nebraska
KIMI	107.7 FM	Malvern, Iowa
KIMN	100.3 FM	Denver, Colorado
KIMO	107.3 FM	Townsend, Montana
KIMW	105.5 FM	Heflin, Louisiana
KIMX	96.7 FM	Laramie, Wyoming
KIMY	93.9 FM	Watonga, Oklahoma
KINB	105.3 FM	Kingfisher, Oklahoma
KIND-FM	94.9 FM	Elk City, Kansas
KINE-FM	105.1 FM	Honolulu, Hawaii
KING-FM	98.1 FM	Seattle, Washington
KINI	96.1 FM	Crookston, Nebraska
KINK	101.9 FM	Portland, Oregon
KINL	92.7 FM	Eagle Pass, Texas
KINS-FM	106.3 FM	Blue Lake, California
KINT-FM	93.9 FM	El Paso, Texas
KINU	89.9 FM	Kotzebue, Alaska
KINX	102.7 FM	Fairfield, Montana
KINZ	95.3 FM	Humboldt, Kansas
KIOA	93.3 FM	Des Moines, Iowa
KIOC	106.1 FM	Orange, Texas
KIOD	105.3 FM	McCook, Nebraska
KIOE	91.3 FM	Utulei Village, American Samoa
KIOI	101.3 FM	San Francisco, California
KIOK	94.9 FM	Richland, Washington
KIOO	99.7 FM	Porterville, California
KIOS-FM	91.5 FM	Omaha, Nebraska
KIOT	102.5 FM	Los Lunas, New Mexico
KIOW	107.3 FM	Forest City, Iowa
KIOX-FM	96.1 FM	Edna, Texas
KIOZ	105.3 FM	San Diego, California
KIPE	89.7 FM	Pine Hills, California
KIPH	88.3 FM	Hana, Hawaii
KIPI	93.5 FM	Eagle Butte, South Dakota
KIPL	89.9 FM	Lihue, Hawaii
KIPM	89.7 FM	Waikapu, Hawaii
KIPO	89.3 FM	Honolulu, Hawaii
KIPR	92.3 FM	Pine Bluff, Arkansas
KIQK	104.1 FM	Rapid City, South Dakota
KIQN	103.3 FM	Colorado City, Colorado
KIQQ-FM	103.7 FM	Newberry Springs, California
KIQX	101.3 FM	Durango, Colorado
KIQZ	92.7 FM	Rawlins, Wyoming
KIRC	105.9 FM	Seminole, Oklahoma
KIRK	99.9 FM	Macon, Missouri
KIRO-FM	97.3 FM	Tacoma, Washington
KIRQ	106.7 FM	Hailey, Idaho
KIRS	107.7 FM	Stockton, Missouri
KISC	98.1 FM	Spokane, Washington
KISD	98.7 FM	Pipestone, Minnesota
KISF	103.5 FM	Las Vegas, Nevada
KISH	102.9 FM	Agana, Guam
KISK	104.9 FM	Cal-Nev-Ari, Nevada
KISL	88.7 FM	Avalon, California
KISM	92.9 FM	Bellingham, Washington
KISN	96.7 FM	Belgrade, Montana
KISO	96.1 FM	Omaha, Nebraska
KISQ	98.1 FM	San Francisco, California
KISR	93.7 FM	Fort Smith, Arkansas
KISS-FM	99.5 FM	San Antonio, Texas
KIST-FM	107.7 FM	Carpinteria, California
KISU-FM	91.1 FM	Pocatello, Idaho
KISV	94.1 FM	Bakersfield, California
KISW	99.9 FM	Seattle, Washington
KISX	107.3 FM	Whitehouse, Texas
KISY	92.7 FM	Blossom, Texas
KISZ-FM	97.9 FM	Cortez, Colorado
KITA	89.5 FM	Iota, Louisiana
KITF	88.3 FM	International Falls, Minnesota
KITH	98.9 FM	Kapaa, Hawaii
KITI-FM	95.1 FM	Winlock, Washington
KITN	93.5 FM	Worthington, Minnesota
KITO-FM	96.1 FM	Vinita, Oklahoma
KITS	105.3 FM	San Francisco, California
KITT	106.5 FM	Meridian, Texas
KITX	95.5 FM	Hugo, Oklahoma
KITY	102.9 FM	Llano, Texas
KIVM	91.1 FM	Fredericksburg, Texas
KIVY-FM	92.7 FM	Crockett, Texas
KIWA-FM	105.3 FM	Sheldon, Iowa
KIWI	102.9 FM	McFarland, California
KIWR	89.7 FM	Council Bluffs, Iowa
KIXA	106.5 FM	Lucerne Valley, California
KIXB	103.3 FM	El Dorado, Arkansas
KIXF	101.5 FM	Baker, California
KIXM	92.3 FM	Victor, Idaho
KIXN	102.9 FM	Hobbs, New Mexico
KIXO	106.1 FM	Sulphur, Oklahoma
KIXQ	102.5 FM	Joplin, Missouri
KIXS	107.9 FM	Victoria, Texas
KIXT	106.7 FM	Hewitt, Texas
KIXV	91.5 FM	Muleshoe, Texas
KIXW-FM	107.3 FM	Lenwood, California
KIXX	96.1 FM	Watertown, South Dakota
KIXY	94.7 FM	San Angelo, Texas
KIYE	88.7 FM	Kamiah, Idaho
KIYK	107.3 FM	Saint George, Utah
KIYS	101.7 FM	Walnut Ridge, Arkansas
KIYU-FM	88.1 FM	Galena, Alaska
KIYX	106.1 FM	Sageville, Iowa
KIZN	92.3 FM	Boise, Idaho
KIZS	101.5 FM	Collinsville, Oklahoma
KIZZ	93.7 FM	Minot, North Dakota

== KJ-- ==
Callsign	Frequency	City of license
KJAB-FM	88.3 FM	Mexico, Missouri
KJAC	105.5 FM	Timnath, Colorado
KJAE	93.5 FM	Leesville, Louisiana
KJAG	107.7 FM	Guthrie, Texas
KJAI	89.5 FM	Ojai, California
KJAQ	96.5 FM	Seattle, Washington
KJAS	107.3 FM	Jasper, Texas
KJAV	104.9 FM	Alamo, Texas
KJAX	93.5 FM	Jackson, Wyoming
KJAZ	94.1 FM	Point Comfort, Texas
KJBA	96.7 FM	Craig, Alaska
KJBI	100.1 FM	Fort Pierre, South Dakota
KJBL	96.5 FM	Julesburg, Colorado
KJBR	93.7 FM	Marked Tree, Arkansas
KJBX	106.3 FM	Trumann, Arkansas
KJBZ	92.7 FM	Laredo, Texas
KJCB	88.9 FM	Lockwood, Montana
KJCC	89.5 FM	Carnegie, Oklahoma
KJCF	89.3 FM	Asotin, Washington
KJCG	88.3 FM	Missoula, Montana
KJCH	90.9 FM	Coos Bay, Oregon
KJCK-FM	97.5 FM	Junction City, Kansas
KJCM	100.3 FM	Snyder, Oklahoma
KJCN	107.5 FM	Sutter Creek, California
KJCS	103.3 FM	Nacogdoches, Texas
KJCU	89.9 FM	Fort Bragg, California
KJCV-FM	89.7 FM	Country Club, Missouri
KJCY	95.5 FM	Saint Ansgar, Iowa
KJDE	100.1 FM	Carbon, Texas
KJDL-FM	105.3 FM	Levelland, Texas
KJDM	101.7 FM	Lindsborg, Kansas
KJDS	101.9 FM	Mountain Pine, Arkansas
KJDR	88.1 FM	Guymon, Oklahoma
KJDX	93.3 FM	Susanville, California
KJDY-FM	94.5 FM	Canyon City, Oregon
KJEB	95.7 FM	Seattle, Washington
KJEE	92.9 FM	Montecito, California
KJEL	103.7 FM	Lebanon, Missouri
KJEM	89.9 FM	Pullman, Washington
KJET	105.7 FM	Union, Washington
KJEZ	95.5 FM	Poplar Bluff, Missouri
KJFA-FM	102.9 FM	Pecos, New Mexico
KJFK-FM	96.3 FM	Llano, Texas
KJFM	102.1 FM	Louisiana, Missouri
KJFT	90.3 FM	Arlee, Montana
KJFX	95.7 FM	Fresno, California
KJGC	88.9 FM	Garden City, Kansas
KJGM	88.3 FM	Bastrop, Louisiana
KJGS	91.9 FM	Aurora, Nebraska
KJGT	88.3 FM	Waconia, Minnesota
KJHA	88.7 FM	Houston, Alaska
KJHF	103.1 FM	Kualapuu, Hawaii
KJHI	88.7 FM	Haviland, Kansas
KJHK	90.7 FM	Lawrence, Kansas
KJHL	90.9 FM	Boise City, Oklahoma
KJHM	101.5 FM	Watkins, Colorado
KJIA	88.9 FM	Spirit Lake, Iowa
KJIC	90.5 FM	Santa Fe, Texas
KJIH	89.9 FM	Manhattan, Kansas
KJIK	100.7 FM	Duncan, Arizona
KJIL	99.1 FM	Copeland, Kansas
KJIR	91.7 FM	Hannibal, Missouri
KJIV	96.5 FM	Madras, Oregon
KJIW-FM	94.5 FM	Helena, Arkansas
KJJB	95.3 FM	Eagle Lake, Texas
KJJF	88.9 FM	Harlingen, Texas
KJJJ	102.3 FM	Laughlin, Nevada
KJJK-FM	96.5 FM	Fergus Falls, Minnesota
KJJM	100.5 FM	Baker, Montana
KJJP	105.7 FM	Amarillo, Texas
KJJS	103.9 FM	Zapata, Texas
KJJY	92.5 FM	West Des Moines–Ankeny, Iowa
KJJZ	95.9 FM	Indian Wells, California
KJKB	106.7 FM	Early, Texas
KJKE	93.3 FM	Newcastle, Oklahoma
KJKF	88.9 FM	Klamath Falls, Oregon
KJKJ	107.5 FM	Grand Forks, North Dakota
KJKK	100.3 FM	Dallas, Texas
KJKL	89.1 FM	Jamestown, North Dakota
KJKQ	99.5 FM	Sisseton, South Dakota
KJKR	88.1 FM	Jamestown, North Dakota
KJKS	99.9 FM	Kahului, Hawaii
KJKT	90.7 FM	Spearfish, South Dakota
KJLB	89.7 FM	Lamar, Colorado
KJLF	90.5 FM	Butte, Montana
KJLG	91.9 FM	Emporia, Kansas
KJLH	102.3 FM	Compton, California
KJLJ	88.5 FM	Scott City, Kansas
KJLO-FM	104.1 FM	Monroe, Louisiana
KJLP	88.9 FM	Palmer, Alaska
KJLS	103.3 FM	Hays, Kansas
KJLT-FM	94.9 FM	North Platte, Nebraska
KJLU	88.9 FM	Jefferson City, Missouri
KJLV	95.3 FM	Los Gatos, California
KJLY	104.5 FM	Blue Earth, Minnesota
KJMA	89.7 FM	Floresville, Texas
KJMB-FM	100.3 FM	Blythe, California
KJMC	89.3 FM	Des Moines, Iowa
KJMD	98.3 FM	Pukalani, Hawaii
KJMG	97.3 FM	Bastrop, Louisiana
KJMH	107.5 FM	Lake Arthur, Louisiana
KJMK	93.9 FM	Webb City, Missouri
KJML	107.1 FM	Columbus, Kansas
KJMM	105.3 FM	Bixby, Oklahoma
KJMN	92.1 FM	Castle Rock, Colorado
KJMO	97.5 FM	Linn, Missouri
KJMQ	98.1 FM	Lihue, Hawaii
KJMS	101.1 FM	Olive Branch, Mississippi
KJMT	97.1 FM	Calico Rock, Arkansas
KJMX	99.5 FM	Reedsport, Oregon
KJMY	99.5 FM	Bountiful, Utah
KJMZ	97.9 FM	Cache, Oklahoma
KJNA-FM	102.7 FM	Jena, Louisiana
KJND-FM	90.7 FM	Williston, North Dakota
KJNP-FM	100.3 FM	North Pole, Alaska
KJNR	91.9 FM	Bethel, Alaska
KJNW	88.5 FM	Kansas City, Missouri
KJNY	99.1 FM	Ferndale, California
KJOC	93.5 FM	Bettendorf, Iowa
KJOE	106.1 FM	Slayton, Minnesota
KJOK	102.7 FM	Hollis, Oklahoma
KJOL-FM	91.9 FM	Montrose, Colorado
KJOR	104.1 FM	Windsor, California
KJOT	105.1 FM	Boise, Idaho
KJOV	90.7 FM	Woodward, Oklahoma
KJOY	99.3 FM	Stockton, California
KJPN	89.3 FM	Payson, Arizona
KJPZ	104.1 FM	East Helena, Montana
KJR-FM	93.3 FM	Seattle, Washington
KJRC	89.9 FM	Rapid City, South Dakota
KJRF	91.1 FM	Lawton, Oklahoma
KJRL	105.7 FM	Herington, Kansas
KJRN	88.3 FM	Keene, Texas
KJRT	88.3 FM	Amarillo, Texas
KJRV	93.3 FM	Wessington Springs, South Dakota
KJSA	89.7 FM	Jonesboro, Arkansas
KJSB	88.3 FM	Jonesboro, Arkansas
KJSD	90.3 FM	Watertown, South Dakota
KJSM-FM	97.7 FM	Augusta, Arkansas
KJSN	102.3 FM	Modesto, California
KJSR	103.3 FM	Tulsa, Oklahoma
KJTA	89.9 FM	Flagstaff, Arizona
KJTF	89.3 FM	North Platte, Nebraska
KJTH	89.7 FM	Ponca City, Oklahoma
KJTS	88.3 FM	New Ulm, Minnesota
KJTT	88.3 FM	Story City, Iowa
KJTW	89.9 FM	Jamestown, North Dakota
KJTX	104.5 FM	Jefferson, Texas
KJTY	88.1 FM	Topeka, Kansas
KJUG-FM	106.7 FM	Tulare, California
KJUL	104.7 FM	Moapa Valley, Nevada
KJVC	92.7 FM	Mansfield, Louisiana
KJVH	89.5 FM	Longview, Washington
KJVI	105.7 FM	Robert Lee, Texas
KJVL	88.1 FM	Hutchinson, Kansas
KJVV	101.9 FM	Twentynine Palms, California
KJWA	89.7 FM	Trinidad, Colorado
KJWC	90.5 FM	Hampton, Iowa
KJWL	99.3 FM	Fresno, California
KJWM	91.5 FM	Grand Island, Nebraska
KJWR	90.9 FM	Windom, Minnesota
KJXK	102.7 FM	San Antonio, Texas
KJXN	105.1 FM	South Park, Wyoming
KJYL	100.7 FM	Eagle Grove, Iowa
KJYO	102.7 FM	Oklahoma City, Oklahoma
KJYR	104.5 FM	Newport, Washington
KJYS	88.1 FM	McCook, Nebraska
KJZA	89.5 FM	Drake, Arizona
KJZC	90.5 FM	Chadron, Nebraska
KJZK	90.7 FM	Kingman, Arizona
KJZP	90.1 FM	Prescott, Arizona
KJZY	93.7 FM	Sebastopol, California
KJZZ	91.5 FM	Phoenix, Arizona

== See also ==
- North American call sign
