= 94.5 FM =

FM radio frequency

The following radio stations broadcast on FM frequency 94.5 MHz:

== Argentina ==
- CNN Radio Santiago del Estero, in Santiago del Estero
- Radio María in Chascomús, Buenos Aires
- Radio María in Caleta Olivia, Santa Cruz
- Radio María in Río Gallegos, Santa Cruz

== Australia ==
- 2FBI in Sydney, New South Wales
- SBS Radio in Lightning Ridge, New South Wales
- ZFM in Newcastle, New South Wales
- 8KNB in Darwin, Northern Territory
- 3RPH Warrnambool in Warrnambool, Victoria
- Triple J in Shepparton, Victoria
- ABC Classic in Albany, Western Australia
- 6MIX in Perth, Western Australia

== Canada (Channel 233) ==
- CBGA-13-FM in Gros Morne, Quebec
- CBUQ-FM in Radium Hot Springs, British Columbia
- CBWJ-FM in The Pas, Manitoba
- CBWP-FM in Leaf Rapids, Manitoba
- CFBT-FM in Vancouver, British Columbia
- CFWE-FM-5 in Fort McMurray, Alberta
- CFWH-FM in Whitehorse, Yukon
- CHAT-FM in Medicine Hat, Alberta
- CHBW-FM in Rocky Mountain House, Alberta
- CHET-FM in Chetwynd, British Columbia
- CHTR-FM in Drumheller, Alberta
- CIBU-FM in Wingham, Ontario
- CIIB-FM in Brockville, Ontario
- CITE-FM-2 in Sherbrooke, Quebec
- CJAB-FM in Chicoutimi, Quebec
- CJFO-FM in Ottawa, Ontario
- CJRG-FM in Gaspe, Quebec
- CKBW-1-FM in Liverpool, Nova Scotia
- CKCK-FM in Regina, Saskatchewan
- CKCW-FM in Moncton, New Brunswick
- CKHT-FM in Hearst, Ontario

== China ==
- Beijing News Radio in Beijing

== Israel ==
- Kan Bet in Beersheba, Eilat, Haifa and the Jordan Rift Valley

== Malaysia ==
- Mix in Klang Valley

== Mexico ==
- XHA-FM in Tijuana, Baja California
- XHBJ-FM in Ciudad Victoria, Tamaulipas
- XHCAB-FM in Caborca, Sonora
- XHCDS-FM in Ciudad Delicias, Chihuahua
- XHEEM-FM in Ríoverde, San Luis Potosí
- XHGES-FM in Culiacán, Sinaloa
- XHGVE-FM in Guasave, Sinaloa
- XHIMER-FM in Mexico City
- XHMIN-FM in Tizimín, Yucatán
- XHNU-FM in Acapulco, Guerrero
- XHPTAC-FM in Tacámbaro, Michoacán
- XHSTH-FM in Santa María Tlahuitoltepec, Oaxaca
- XHTA-FM in Piedras Negras, Coahuila
- XHTPO-FM in Tampico, Tamaulipas
- XHUAA-FM in Aguascalientes, Aguascalientes
- XHVG-FM in Mérida, Yucatán
- XHYV-FM in Fortín, Veracruz

== Panama ==
- W Radio Panama in Panama City

== Philippines ==
- DWIP in Santiago, Isabela
- DZRP-FM in Goa, Camarines Sur
- DYTJ in Kalibo, Aklan

== Sierra Leone ==
- BBC World Service in Bo

== South Africa ==
- KFM (Cape Town) in Cape Town

== United Kingdom ==
- BBC Radio Ulster in Northern Ireland

== United States (Channel 233) ==
- KATS in Yakima, Washington
- KAWJ in Coarsegold, California
- KBAY in Gilroy, California
- KBFE-LP in Bakersfield, California
- KCGC in Merino, Colorado
- KCNO in Alturas, California
- KDLB in Frazee, Minnesota
- KEEI in Oakwood, Texas
- KEMA (FM) in Three Rivers, Texas
- KEMX in Locust Grove, Oklahoma
- KFMX in Lubbock, Texas
- KFPW in Barling, Arkansas
- KFRQ in Harlingen, Texas
- KFSS-LP in Joplin, Missouri
- KFZN in Gainesville, Texas
- KGEN in Hanford, California
- KGWD in Sioux Falls, South Dakota
- KHTQ in Hayden, Idaho
- KJDY-FM in Canyon City, Oregon
- KJIW-FM in Helena, Arkansas
- KKAS-LP in Tafuna, American Samoa
- KKEZ in Fort Dodge, Iowa
- KKLR in Poplar Bluff, Missouri
- KLGL in Salina, Utah
- KLIQ in Hastings, Nebraska
- KLYK in Kelso, Washington
- KMGE in Eugene, Oregon
- KMLD in Casper, Wyoming
- KMON in Great Falls, Montana
- KMYT (FM) in Temecula, California
- KOOL in Phoenix, Arizona
- KPLO in Reliance, South Dakota
- KPMI-FM in Baudette, Minnesota
- KQDY in Bismarck, North Dakota
- KRGQ in Yuma, Colorado
- KRUF in Shreveport, Louisiana
- KRXL in Kirksville, Missouri
- KRXY in Shelton, Washington
- KSEH in Brawley, California
- KSKI-FM in Sun Valley, Idaho
- KSKL in Scott City, Kansas
- KSMB (FM) in Lafayette, Louisiana
- KSOC in Tipton, Oklahoma
- KSPE in Ellwood, California
- KSTP in Saint Paul, Minnesota
- KTBZ in Houston, Texas
- KTHX-FM in Sun Valley, Nevada
- KTUN in New Castle, Colorado
- KULT-LP in Cedar Falls, Iowa
- KUOL in Elko, Nevada
- KVBB-LP in Big Bear Lake, California
- KVFX in Logan, Utah
- KWBT in Waco, Texas
- KWNE in Ukiah, California
- KWQA-LP in Chico, California
- KWTY in Cartago, California
- KXLI in Moapa, Nevada
- KYAT in Gallup, New Mexico
- WAOO-LP in Suwanee, Georgia
- WAQA-LP in Morganton, Georgia
- WARO in Naples, Florida
- WBFW in Smith Mills, Kentucky
- WBYZ in Baxley, Georgia
- WCCR-LP in Williamsburg, Kentucky
- WCEN in Hemlock, Michigan
- WCFB in Daytona Beach, Florida
- WCMS in Hatteras, North Carolina
- WDAC in Lancaster, Pennsylvania
- WDVT in Rutland, Vermont
- WELY in Ely, Minnesota
- WERB in Berlin, Connecticut
- WFDR in Woodbury, Georgia
- WFLF in Parker, Florida
- WHOD in Jackson, Alabama
- WHPY-FM in Bellevue, Tennessee
- WIBW in Topeka, Kansas
- WIPK in Calhoun, Georgia
- WJJZ in Irasburg, Vermont
- WJMN (FM) in Boston, Massachusetts
- WJOX-FM in Birmingham, Alabama
- WJZD in Long Beach, Mississippi
- WKLQ in Holland, Michigan
- WKSQ in Ellsworth, Maine
- WKTI in Milwaukee, Wisconsin
- WKVG in Greenville, South Carolina
- WKXS in Leland, North Carolina
- WLRW in Champaign, Illinois
- WMCZ-LP in Camilla, Georgia
- WMRW-LP in Warren, Vermont
- WMXL in Lexington, Kentucky
- WNED in Buffalo, New York
- WNLI in State College, Pennsylvania
- WNRA-LP in Hawk Pride, Alabama
- WOXY in Englewood, Ohio
- WPST in Trenton, New Jersey
- WPTI in Eden, North Carolina
- WRGW-LP in Shawano, Wisconsin
- WRJO in Eagle River, Wisconsin
- WRMV-LP in Madison Heights, Virginia
- WRVQ in Richmond, Virginia
- WRWO-LP in Ottawa, Illinois
- WRZR in Loogootee, Indiana
- WSBX in Mackinaw City, Michigan
- WSPX in Bowman, South Carolina
- WSQF-LP in Key Biscayne, Florida
- WTKN in Murrells Inlet, South Carolina
- WTMB in Tomah, Wisconsin
- WUMO-LP in Montgomery, Alabama
- WVGK-LP in Miami, Florida
- WVHO-LP in Nanticoke, Pennsylvania
- WWSW in Pittsburgh, Pennsylvania
- WXKR in Port Clinton, Ohio
- WYKV in Ravena, New York
- WYNL in Dunbar, West Virginia
- WYYY in Syracuse, New York
