= KGEN =

KGEN may refer to:

- KGEN (AM), a radio station (1370 AM) licensed to Tulare, California, United States
- KGEN-FM, a radio station (94.5 FM) licensed to Hanford, California, United States
