= KJUG =

KJUG may refer to:

- KJUG-FM, a radio station (106.7 FM) licensed to serve Tulare, California, United States
- KVMI, a radio station (1270 AM) licensed to serve Tulare, California, which held the call sign KJUG from 1989 to 2015
