= KZYM =

Radio station in Joplin, Missouri

Coordinates: 37°04′34″N 94°32′32″W

- Joplin, Missouri; United States
- Frequency: 1230 kHz
- Branding: AM 1230 The Talker

Programming
- Format: News/talk
- Affiliations: Compass Media Networks; Premiere Networks; Radio America; Salem Radio Network; Townhall; Westwood One

Ownership
- Owner: Zimmer Radio, Inc.
- Sister stations: KIXQ, KJMK, KSYN, KXDG, KZRG

History
- First air date: 1946
- Former call signs: KSWM (1946–1956); KODE (1956–1984); KLES (1984–1987); KSSC (1987–1990); KWAS (1990–2005)

Technical information
- Licensing authority: FCC
- Facility ID: 407
- Class: C
- Power: 560 watts day 600 watts night

Links
- Public license information: Public file; LMS
- Webcast: Listen Live
- Website: 1230thetalker.com

KZYM (1230 AM) is an American radio station broadcasting from Joplin, Missouri.

== Programming ==
AM 1230 The Talker features: Glenn Beck, Markley Van Camp and Robbins, Dave Ramsey, Jesse Kelly, and At Home with Gary Sullivan.

KZYM also features news from SRN (Salem Radio Network) at the top and bottom of the hour. Salem provides national news with a Christian view.

KZYM broadcasts St. Louis Cardinals and Missouri Southern State University football, men's and women's basketball games. KZYM also airs Joplin High football and basketball.
