= KGRU =

KGRU may refer to:

- KGRU (FM), a radio station (89.5 FM) licensed to serve Burwell, Nebraska, United States
- KGRU-LP, a defunct radio station (96.1 FM) formerly licensed to serve Ellensburg, Washington, United States
