= KRXV =

Radio station in Yermo, California, United States

KRXV and KHWY
KRXV: Yermo, California; KHWY: Essex, California; United States
- Broadcast area: Mojave Desert
- Frequencies: KRXV: 98.1 MHz; KHWY: 98.9 MHz
- Branding: Revolution Hits 98.1

Programming
- Format: Hot adult contemporary; travelers' information

Ownership
- Owner: Marco Mazzoli; (ANCO Media Group, LLC)
- Sister stations: KIXW-FM; KIXF; KHYZ

History
- First air date: KRXV: February 5, 1980; KHWY: March 1991
- Call sign meaning: KRXV: "Route 15" (XV); KHWY: Highway

Technical information
- Licensing authority: FCC
- Facility ID: KRXV: 34554; KHWY: 34556
- Class: KRXV: B; KHWY: B
- ERP: KRXV: 1,550 watts; KHWY: 9,000 watts
- HAAT: KRXV: 695 meters (2,280 ft); KHWY: 348 meters (1,142 ft)
- Transmitter coordinates: KRXV: 34°59′43″N 116°50′18″W; KHWY: 34°52′49.9″N 115°4′8.9″W

Links
- Public license information: KRXV: Public file; LMS; KHWY: Public file; LMS
- Website: www.revolutionhits.com

KRXV (98.1 FM) and KHWY (98.9 FM) are radio stations, licensed to Yermo, California and Essex, California. They collectively broadcast a hot adult contemporary format branded as Revolution Hits 98.1. The stations are owned by Marco Mazzoli's ANCO Media Group, with studios at Barstow Station on East Main Street in Barstow, California.

The simulcast targets travelers to Las Vegas and Laughlin, Nevada, on Interstate 15 and Interstate 40; alongside its music programming, the stations carry traffic and weather information, information and advertising for events, casinos, nightclubs, and other businesses around Southern Nevada, and businesses in the Barstow area.

== History ==
The concept for the stations was developed by Howard Anderson. At the time, Anderson was the vice president of marketing of the Desert Inn. He recognized that residents of Southern California represented a large portion of Las Vegas tourism, that travelers heading to Vegas on I-15 were a captive audience for advertising local casinos and hotels (as an alternative to prohibitively expensive ad time in Los Angeles itself), and that there were little to no radio stations along the corridor. While his plans were briefly stalled by the death of Desert Inn owner Howard Hughes, Anderson began to actively pursue the establishment of his highway radio stations in 1978. He scouted two transmitter sites; Calico Peaks near Yermo, California, and Clark Mountain near Mountain Pass, California, which he believed would provide sufficient coverage of the route.

The two stations launched as KRXV and KXVR in 1980; their formats featured songs by performers associated with Las Vegas (such as Frank Sinatra, and advertising for events and attractions in the city. The music content later shifted to a straightforward adult contemporary format. During the morning hours, the stations carried local programming and advertising for Barstow, California, as Anderson believed that casino advertisers were not interested in the timeslot.

Prior to the advent of satellite radio and internet radio over mobile broadband, the stations enjoyed a captive market in a region where few other broadcast stations operated.

In December 1984, KXVR 99.5 FM increased its power from 2,200 to 10,000 watts. In April 1988, translator K252CQ 98.3 FM was added to provide supplementary coverage to the Victor Valley area. In March 1991, KHWY 98.9 FM in Essex was added to provide coverage to Laughlin and along I-40. In June 1992, KXVR changed its call letters to KHYZ. In June 2002, KHYZ moved from 99.5 FM to 99.7 FM, and decreased in power to 8,400 watts. In June 2009, KHYZ added a booster signal in Las Vegas to improve its coverage in the city itself. KHYZ later relocated its main transmitter and increased the power to 50,000 Watts.

In August 2009, The Highway Stations laid off 10 employees, including the four on air personalities in favor of a fully automated format, due to budget cuts. The station was then rebranded as The Highway. In September 2010, Highway Radio merged with What's On, a company which produces What's On Magazine. Highway Radio's vice president/general manager was let go along with another employee from the Los Angeles office. The Los Angeles office was then closed down.

=== The Highway Vibe ===
Logo as The Highway Vibe, 2011-2023

On July 2, 2011, after KVBE in Moapa, Nevada was taken over by Jelli under a local marketing agreement and relaunched with an interactive CHR format, KHWY and KHYZ-FM2 began to air dance radio programming produced by its former operators under the Vibe branding from 12 a.m. to 5 a.m. nightly. On September 12, 2011, The Highway flipped to dance music full-time as Highway Vibe. The format was short-lived, however; the stations would segue to a hot adult contemporary format by November 2011, maintaining the Highway Vibe branding.

In early-2017, parent company KHWY, Inc. filed for chapter 11 bankruptcy, and the Highway Vibe network was put up for auction. Heftel Broadcasting Company won the auction with a $620,000 bid, with the Educational Media Foundation having offered $525,000 for just KRXV and KHYZ.

On October 5, 2023, KHYZ returned to dance music as Vibe 99.7, programmed by the staff of Las Vegas station KGHD-LD Acid 87.7. KRXV and KHWY continued under the hot AC format as Vibe 98.1.

In December 2025, it was announced that Marco Mazzoli (via ANCO Media Group)—owner of WZFL in Miami—would acquire most of the Heftel Broadcasting Company stations. The sale excluded KHDR/KNAC, which is partially owned by Point Broadcasting.

== Coverage ==
Programming is distributed across three main transmitters covering the Mojave Desert:

- KRXV 98.1 in Yermo, near Barstow.
- KHWY 98.9, added in 1991 to cover Interstate 40 between Essex and Laughlin.
- KHYZ-HD2 99.7-2 in Mountain Pass, California (near the California-Nevada state line), serving Primm and Las Vegas. Originally at 99.5, the frequency switch was made in 2002 to improve reception between Baker and the state line. The signal was boosted further sometime in 2008 or 2009 to be heard better in Las Vegas. The station has a construction permit to move its signal into Las Vegas, along with an increase in power.

Broadcasts can normally be heard beginning as far south as Rosamond, California, on State Route 14 to the State Route 58 turn off in Mojave, California. The broadcast is audible on State Route 58 from Mojave through Barstow, California, where State Route 58 ends into Interstate 15. From Barstow north on the 15 broadcast can be heard normally past the Nevada state line and in the Las Vegas Valley itself. Audible broadcast can normally be picked up on the majority of State Route 138 to its junction with Interstate 15 and also Interstate 40 from Barstow to around Kingman, Arizona.

=== Boosters ===
Call sign	Frequency	City of license	FID	ERP (W)	HAAT	Class	FCC info	Notes
KRXV-FM1	98.1 FM	Victorville, California	203576	70	282 m (925 ft)	D	LMS	KRXV booster

== See also ==
- Highway Country
- The Highway Drive
- Vibe 99.7
