= KHCT =

KHCT may refer to:

- Kingston upon Hull City Transport, former municipal bus operator in Kingston upon Hull, England
- KHCT (FM), a radio station (90.9 FM) licensed to Great Bend, Kansas, United States
