= KPNO =

KPNO may refer to:

- Kitt Peak National Observatory, astronomical observatory in Arizona
- KPNO (FM), a Christian radio station in Norfolk, Nebraska, repeating the signal from KGRD in Orchard, Nebraska
- K-Pop Night Out at SXSW, original name of Korea Spotlight, an annual concert of South Korean artists held in the United States
