= KHCC =

KHCC may refer to:

- KHCC-FM, a radio station (90.1 FM) licensed to serve Hutchinson, Kansas, United States
- KHCC-LP, a defunct low-power television station (channel 35) formerly licensed to serve Corpus Christi, Texas, United States
- King Hussein Cancer Center, a hospital located in Amman, Jordan specialized in treating adult and pediatric cancers.
