= KTIP =

- Porterville, California; United States
- Broadcast area: Visalia-Tulare area
- Frequency: 1450 kHz
- Branding: Jam'n 101.3

Programming
- Format: Rhythmic oldies

Ownership
- Owner: Jose Arredondo; (JA Ventures, Inc.)
- Sister stations: KGEN, KGEN-FM

History
- First air date: c. January 1947

Technical information
- Licensing authority: FCC
- Facility ID: 17388
- Class: C
- Power: 1,000 watts (unlimited)
- Transmitter coordinates: 36°5′43″N 119°3′8″W
- Translator: 101.3 K267CG (Porterville)

Links
- Public license information: Public file; LMS
- Webcast: Listen live
- Website: jamn1013.com

KTIP (1450 AM) is a commercial radio station licensed to Porterville, California, United States, and serving the Visalia--Tulare area of Central California. Owned by Jose Arredondo, through licensee JA Ventures, Inc., it features a rhythmic oldies format. KTIP calls itself "Jam'n 101.3", the dial position of its companion FM translator, K267CG at 101.3 MHz in Porterville.

== History ==
KTIP became one of the first radio stations in the West to sign on after World War II. Its construction permit was granted by the Federal Communications Commission (FCC) in August 1946, to Porterville businessman Jack Tighe (pronounced "tie"). He owned Tighe Chevrolet Company and an appliance store in Porterville, so he wanted to have a radio station for his customers to tune to when they bought radios and cars equipped with radios.

Construction of the station was completed by Christmas of 1946. Its exact sign-on date is not known, but the station was notified by the FCC's San Francisco office in January 1947 for failure to issue a proper station identification during one hour of programming that month. So it has been concluded that KTIP was "on the air" in January 1947. KTIP, in its early years, had a full-time power of 250 watts.

KTIP was featured in a Life magazine article in its March 24, 1947 issue. The subhead declared, "Local news and interviews help KTIP compete with big networks in a small California town." The ten photos accompanying the article helped profile a town of 6,827 people with a smog-free view of the Sierra Nevada mountains.

Tighe's ownership of the station ended in 1954, when he sold the station to a Miller Broadcasting, based in the Midwest. According to subsequent owner Larry Cotta, Miller Broadcasting owned the station for a very short time. Cotta recalls Miller turned the station's revenues into the black and used the profits to pay off debts he had incurred from station ownership in other locations. That done, Miller quickly sold KTIP to Gary Garland and Larry Cotta.

In 1978, Garland and Cotta sold the station to Monte Moore and his friend Frank Haas. It was during the Moore ownership that KTIP took on the persona of its owner like few other radio stations. Moore was a play-by-play broadcaster for the Oakland A's baseball team, beginning when the A's were a Kansas City franchise in 1962. He also did play-by-play for the NBC television game of the week in the 1970s.

Former logo

In 2018, the station was sold to Jose Arredondo, the owner of 1370 KGEN and 94.5 KGEN-FM in Tulare County. Arredondo put a rhythmic oldies format on KTIP, calling it "Jam'n 101.3."
