= WPAK =

WPAK may refer to:

- WPAK (AM), a radio station (1490 AM) licensed to Farmville, Virginia, United States
- WPAK-FM, a radio station (106.9 FM) licensed to Tigerton, Wisconsin, United States
