= KIXW =

KIXW may refer to:

- KIXW-FM, a radio station (107.3 FM) licensed to Lenwood, California, United States
- KIXW (AM), a radio station (960 AM) licensed to Apple Valley, California, United States
