= KXDG =

Coordinates: 37.243°N 94.506°W

- Everything That Rocks!
- Webb City, Missouri; United States
- Broadcast area: Joplin, Missouri
- Frequency: 97.9 MHz (HD Radio)
- Branding: Big Dog 97.9

Programming
- Format: Mainstream rock
- Affiliations: United Stations Radio Networks

Ownership
- Owner: Zimmer Radio, Inc.
- Sister stations: KIXQ, KJMK, KSYN, KZRG, KZYM

History
- First air date: 1997
- Call sign meaning: DG for "dog"

Technical information
- Licensing authority: FCC
- Facility ID: 17125
- Class: C3
- ERP: 15,500 watts
- HAAT: 127 meters

Links
- Public license information: Public file; LMS
- Webcast: Listen Live
- Website: bigdog979.com

KXDG (97.9 FM) is a mainstream rock radio station licensed to Webb City, Missouri, owned by Zimmer Radio Group. KXDG began broadcasting in HD Radio in 2006 and ceased HD Radio broadcast in 2014. It was the first radio station in the four-state area to begin multicasting. Its slogan is "Big Dog 97.9 Joplin's Rock Station and The 4 States Rocker Big Dog 97.9"
