= XHUAA-FM =

Radio station in Aguascalientes, Aguascalientes

- Aguascalientes City, Aguascalientes; Mexico
- Frequency: 94.5 FM
- Branding: Radio Universidad

Programming
- Format: University radio

Ownership
- Owner: Autonomous University of Aguascalientes; (Universidad Autónoma de Aguascalientes)

History
- First air date: January 13, 1978; June 19, 2006 (FM)
- Former call signs: XEUAA-AM
- Call sign meaning: Universidad Autónoma de Aguascalientes

Technical information
- Licensing authority: CRT
- Class: B1
- ERP: 25 kW
- HAAT: −64.07 meters (−210.2 ft)

Links
- Webcast: Listen live
- Website: radio.uaa.mx

XHUAA-FM is a university radio station on 94.5 FM in Aguascalientes City, Aguascalientes, Mexico, owned by the Autonomous University of Aguascalientes.

== History ==
The UAA's radio station started out on AM as XEUAA-AM 1520, debuting on January 13, 1978. In 2006, the station moved to FM on 94.5 MHz.
