= KTIJ =

- Elk City, Oklahoma; United States
- Broadcast area: Southwest Oklahoma
- Frequency: 106.9 MHz
- Branding: The Zone

Programming
- Format: Contemporary hit radio

Ownership
- Owner: Fuchs Radio, LLC
- Sister stations: KTJS, KHIM, KJCM, KHWL

Technical information
- Licensing authority: FCC
- Facility ID: 70631
- Class: C1
- ERP: 100,000 watts
- HAAT: 299 meters (981 ft)
- Transmitter coordinates: 34.97750°N 99.40972°W
- Translator: 100.3 K262BW (Duncan)

Links
- Public license information: Public file; LMS
- Webcast: Listen live
- Website: foxradiook.com

KTIJ (106.9 FM) is a radio station licensed to Elk City, Oklahoma. The station broadcasts a contemporary hit radio format and is owned by Fuchs Radio, LLC.

== Translator ==
Call sign	Frequency	City of license	FID	ERP (W)	HAAT	Class	FCC info
K262BW	100.3 FM	Duncan, Oklahoma	141886	250	87 m (285 ft)	D	LMS
