= XHPTAC-FM =

Radio station in Tacámbaro, Michoacán, Mexico

- Tacámbaro, Michoacán; Mexico
- Frequency: 94.5 MHz
- Branding: Ke Buena

Programming
- Format: Regional Mexican
- Affiliations: Radiópolis

Ownership
- Owner: Radiodifusora de Tierra Caliente, S.A. de C.V.

History
- First air date: February 12, 2018
- Call sign meaning: Tacámbaro

Technical information
- Class: A
- ERP: 3 kW

XHPTAC-FM is a radio station on 94.5 FM in Tacámbaro, Michoacán. It is owned by Radiodifusora de Tierra Caliente and carries the Ke Buena national Regional Mexican format from Radiópolis.

== History ==
XHPTAC was awarded in the IFT-4 radio auction of 2017 and came to air at 6:44 pm on February 12, 2018. XHPTAC, together with station XHPQGA in Quiroga, were, of the now extinct, Grupo Vox first commercially licensed radio stations.

In 2025, the concession of XHPTAC-FM was transferred to Radiodifusora de Tierra Caliente, S.A. de C.V.
