= KVIS =

- Miami, Oklahoma; United States
- Broadcast area: Joplin, Missouri
- Frequency: 910 kHz

Programming
- Format: Southern Gospel
- Affiliations: Salem Communications

Ownership
- Owner: Mark Linn; (Taylor Made Broadcasting Network, LLC)
- Sister stations: KGVE, KGLC

Technical information
- Licensing authority: FCC
- Facility ID: 18056
- Class: B
- Power: 1,000 watts unlimited
- Transmitter coordinates: 36°53′27″N 94°47′0″W

Links
- Public license information: Public file; LMS
- Webcast: www.mainstreamnetwork.com/listen/player.asp?station=kvis-am

KVIS (910 AM) is a radio station broadcasting a Southern Gospel format. Licensed to Miami, Oklahoma, United States, the station serves the Joplin, Missouri, area. The station is currently owned by Mark Linn, through licensee Taylor Made Broadcasting Network, LLC, and features programming from Salem Communications.

== History ==
KVIS was previously a Pop music station, formerly airing the American Top 40 radio broadcast with Casey Kasem during the 1970s.
