= XHCDS-FM =

Radio station in Ciudad Delicias, Chihuahua, Mexico

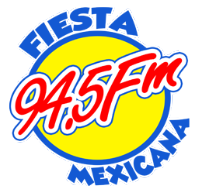
- Delicias, Chihuahua; Mexico
- Frequency: 94.5 FM
- Branding: Fiesta

Programming
- Format: Regional Mexican

Ownership
- Owner: Promosat Chihuahua; (José Pérez Ramírez)

History
- First air date: October 28, 1994 (concession)
- Call sign meaning: "Ciudad Delicias"

Technical information
- Licensing authority: CRT
- Class: B
- ERP: 50 kW
- HAAT: 51.4 m (169 ft)

Links
- Webcast: Listen live
- Website: fiestamexicana945.mx

XHCDS-FM is a radio station on 94.5 FM in Delicias, Chihuahua, Mexico. The station is owned by Promosat Chihuahua and known as Fiesta with a regional Mexican format.

== History ==
XHCDS received its concession on October 28, 1994.
