= KSYN =

Coordinates: 37.097°N 94.574°W

- Joplin, Missouri; United States
- Broadcast area: Joplin, MO-Pittsburg, KS-Miami, OK
- Frequency: 92.5 MHz (HD Radio)
- Branding: Kissin' 92.5

Programming
- Format: Contemporary hit radio
- Subchannels: HD2: Classic hits "Kissin Again"
- Affiliations: Compass Media Networks; Premiere Networks; Westwood One

Ownership
- Owner: Zimmer Radio, Inc.
- Sister stations: KIXQ, KJMK, KXDG, KZRG, KZYM

History
- Call sign meaning: "Kissin"

Technical information
- Licensing authority: FCC
- Facility ID: 73244
- Class: C0
- ERP: 100,000 watts
- HAAT: 300 meters

Links
- Public license information: Public file; LMS
- Webcast: Listen Live
- Website: kissin925.com

KSYN (92.5 FM), known as "Kissin' 92.5", is a contemporary hit radio radio station licensed to Joplin, Missouri. It serves the "Four-State Region". Cities in KSYN's primary coverage area include Joplin, Neosho, Monett, and Nevada, Missouri; Pittsburg, Parsons, Fort Scott, and Chanute, Kansas; Miami and Vinta, Oklahoma; and Bella Vista, Rogers, and Bentonville, Arkansas.

== Founder ==
KSYN was founded in 1960 by William B. "Bill" Neal. Following an injury that occurred during the Battle of the Bulge, Neal was transferred to Paris, France where he began his career in broadcasting with the Armed Forces Radio Service. In addition to KSYN, Neal owned WMBH and founded Joplin AM station KQYX. In 2000, Neal was awarded the Pioneer in Broadcasting Award from Missouri Southern State University in recognition of his work in the development of FM radio and for his role in popularizing the modern AM talk radio format. He is also one of only six individuals to be honored with the Lifetime Member award from the Missouri Broadcasters Association.

== History ==
=== The 1960s & 1970s ===
On December 19, 1960, KSYN became the first FM radio station to operate in the Four State Region. It was the tenth FM station established in Missouri and the state's most powerful, with a 100,000-watt tower that stood more than 90 stories tall. In these early days, KSYN could be heard clearly as far away as Kansas City, Missouri, and Tulsa, Oklahoma. It began carrying the American Top 40 program with Casey Kasem during the early 1970s.

While the increasing popularity of Rock 'n' Roll helped propel KSYN's rapid ascent to number one in listener ratings, Neal still had to overcome a fundamental problem: few people in those days owned FM receivers. To meet this challenge, KSYN provided free radios to area businesses and organizations so that they could hear for themselves the differences in sound quality between AM and FM. A small black and silver sign was provided with each radio for display reading, "The Wonderful Sound of F.M. - KSYN". To reach mobile listeners, the station gave away hundreds of FM car radios at live remotes and on the air to callers who answered trivia questions correctly. To those unable to obtain free FM radios, the station offered receivers for sale at wholesale prices.

During this period, KSYN was known for large-scale, innovative promotions. In a 2000 interview with Missouri Southern State University, Bill Neal remarked that "Radio is about promotion." Translating this philosophy into action, the station regularly underwrote the costs of bringing popular artists to Joplin. It also developed an annual "KSYN Olympics," which was held at Wildcat Park and Shadow Lake. Events included bikini contests, boat races, and numerous other competitions designed to entertain large and often raucous crowds. One particularly memorable promotion involved a helicopter that showered $40,000 in cash and prizes over downtown Joplin. This promotion effectively closed downtown for a day, leading the city to inform the station owner that any future permit applications would not be viewed favorably.

In the late 1960s and throughout most of the 1970s, broadcasting Hall of Fame announcer Bob James hosted a popular news talk show on Sunday mornings that featured local and state public officials, high school and college coaches, and other newsmakers. James is perhaps best known for his coverage of the Connor Hotel collapse, which occurred on November 11, 1978. During the days following the incident, KSYN provided in-depth coverage of the events from its mobile news unit, which was parked downtown near what remained of the hotel. James' reporting focused on the search and rescue efforts for three men who were trapped beneath the rubble. When, after 77 hours, rescue workers found one of the men alive in a corner of the hotel's basement, James was there to report the news that so many had been waiting to hear. With Bob James as News Director, KSYN was an important source for both news and entertainment. At the time, KSYN was known as "K-92".

=== The 1980s ===
KSYN may have reached its apex in terms of popularity and influence in the early and middle 1980s. In 1985, for example, KSYN had 17.5 percent of the total listenership, winning the top spot for every segment of the day. Radio was still largely free of competition from other music delivery platforms; MTV was just catching on and the internet, MP3 players, and satellite radio had yet to be created.

Rather than sitting back and allowing the popularity of the format to carry the station, Bill Neal sought to cement KSYN as an indelible part of local popular culture. He accomplished this by further accelerating promotional activities. During these years, KSYN tee shirts and bumper stickers were ubiquitous throughout the Four State Area. The station regularly gave away thousands of dollars in cash, not to mention countless tee shirts, hats, cases of soft drinks, and tickets to the now legendary and iconic Worlds Of Fun and their then new waterpark Oceans Of Fun. And KSYN didn't just broadcast the music; it brought the artists who made the music to Joplin, sponsoring top-shelf acts such as Joan Jett and The Blackhearts, Jefferson Starship, Air Supply, Stevie Ray Vaughan, John Waite, Survivor, Night Ranger, and Cheap Trick. In addition, KSYN's current moniker draws its heritage from this period when, in the early 1980s, it was known as "92 FM KSYN Joplin's Number One Hit Music Leader."

=== The 1990s ===
Led by Tulsa, Oklahoma's Garth Brooks, the early 1990s saw a powerful resurgence in country music. Seemingly overnight, country overtook rock as the most popular radio format. Put simply, country was in and rock was out. This phenomenon knocked KSYN from atop the listener ratings for consecutive years for the first time in its history. And while country music's popularity has receded from this high-water mark, it remains to this day the most popular format in the Four State Region.

Although the early 1990s and country music brought an end to KSYN's 40-year reign at the pinnacle of listener ratings, this period is not without its high points. Chief among these is that the broadcasting station was refurbished. Compact disk players replaced tapes and records, improving sound quality. Computers took the place of several refrigerator-sized mechanical processors, enhancing programming reliability. And remote satellite programs replaced overnight announcers, saving costs while adding an element of national entertainment to the lineup. In short, the station took a giant leap toward the 21st Century.

By 1995 rock had begun to recover and so had KSYN's listener ratings. Given the overall favorable dynamics, it was in this year that William B. Neal chose to conclude his career in broadcasting—a career that spanned more than a half-century by selling KSYN to Big Mack Broadcasting, Inc. Big Mack was owned by Chuck Dunaway who was, like his predecessor, an influential figure within the radio business, having been inducted into both the Texas and Ohio Broadcasting Halls of Fame.

Chuck Dunaway's career in radio began in 1952 as an announcer for KBST in Big Spring, Texas. Quickly rising through the ranks, in the late 1950s he assumed the afternoon drivetime slot for New York's top-rated station, WABC-AM. Dunaway eventually parlayed his success as an announcer into station proprietorship, purchasing his first radio station in 1982 and eventually owning six in the Joplin market alone. Under Dunaway's relatively brief period of ownership, KSYN continued much as it had under Neal. Chuck Dunaway's legacy at KSYN could be described as that of a steady and experienced hand who bridged the gap between long-term owners.

=== The 2000s And Now ===
If one were looking to quickly categorize KSYN's history, it could be logically divided into two parts: the William B. Neal era, which spans from 1960 to 1995; and the James L. Zimmer era, which began in 1998 and continues into the present.

Since 1998, KSYN has been owned by James L. "Jimmy" Zimmer under the Zimmer family's Zimmer Radio Group (1998–2006) and Zimmer Radio, Inc (2007–present). During the Zimmer era, the station has been brought fully into the modern, computer age and KSYN's position near the top of listener surveys has been reestablished and KSYN was reborn under their now legendary moniker name; "Kissin' 92.5 FM".

Under Jimmy Zimmer's leadership, KSYN became only the second station in the Four-State Region to begin broadcasting in HD Radio and was one of the first to embrace the internet platform for content distribution. The station's HD2 channel, "Kissin' HD2", offers improved sound quality and a slightly different format than the primary KSYN in the form of more urban oriented music.
