= XHEEM-FM =

Radio station in Ríoverde, San Luis Potosí

- Ríoverde, San Luis Potosí; Mexico
- Frequency: 94.5 FM
- Branding: La M Mexicana

Programming
- Format: Regional Mexican

Ownership
- Owner: Grupo Radiofónico MASS; (Informas Zona Media, S.A. de C.V.)

History
- First air date: February 18, 1958

Technical information
- Licensing authority: CRT
- Class: B1
- ERP: 25 kW
- HAAT: −40.1 m (−132 ft)
- Transmitter coordinates: 21°55′52.85″N 100°00′40.69″W

Links
- Website: radiomasem.com

XHEEM-FM is a radio station on 94.5 FM in Ríoverde, San Luis Potosí. It carries a Regional Mexican format known as La M Mexicana.

== History ==
XEEM-AM 880 received its concession on February 3, 1958 and was formally inaugurated 15 days later. It was owned by Carlos Martínez Guillén and broadcast as a daytimer with 1,000 watts. Later, power increased to 5,000 watts with 1,000 at night.

In 2011, XEEM was approved to migrate to FM as XHEEM-FM 94.5.
