= KZRG =

- Joplin, Missouri; United States
- Broadcast area: Joplin, MO; Pittsburg, KS; and Miami, OK
- Frequency: 1310 kHz
- Branding: NewsTalk KZRG

Programming
- Format: News/talk
- Affiliations: Fox News Radio; Compass Media Networks; Premiere Networks; Westwood One

Ownership
- Owner: Zimmer Radio
- Sister stations: KIXQ, KJMK, KSYN, KXDG, KZYM

History
- First air date: November 22, 1947
- Call sign meaning: Zimmer Radio Group

Technical information
- Licensing authority: FCC
- Facility ID: 71605
- Class: B
- Power: 5,000 watts day; 1,000 watts night
- Transmitter coordinates: 37°7′3″N 94°32′41″W
- Translators: 102.9 K275BD (Joplin, relays KIXQ-HD2); 105.9 K290CO (Neosho)
- Repeater: 102.5 KIXQ-HD2 (Joplin)

Links
- Public license information: Public file; LMS
- Webcast: Listen Live
- Website: newstalkkzrg.com

KZRG (1310 AM) is a commercial radio station broadcasting from Joplin, Missouri. It airs a news/talk radio format and is owned by Zimmer Radio The studios and offices are on East 32nd Street in Joplin.

KZRG is powered at 5,000 watts by day. At night, to protect other stations on 1310 AM, it reduces power to 1,000 watts. A directional antenna is used at all times. The transmitter is on North Peace Church Avenue in Joplin. KZRG can also be heard on two FM translators, 102.9 MHz K275BD in Joplin and 105.9 K290CO in Neosho, Missouri. Programming is also simulcast on the HD Radio digital subchannel of sister station KIXQ.

== Programming ==
Weekdays feature a three-hour news morning news block, The KZRG Morning Newswatch. That's followed by nationally syndicated conservative talk radio hosts the rest of the day, including Chris Plante, Rush Limbaugh, Sean Hannity, Mark Levin, Joe Pags, Clyde Lewis, Coast to Coast AM with George Noory and This Morning, America's First News with Gordon Deal.

Weekends feature shows on home repair, guns, gardening, technology and real estate, as well as repeats of the weekday shows. Syndicated weekend hosts include Ron Wilson, Kim Komando, Bill Handel, Ben Ferguson, Bill Cunningham and "Route 66 with Terry Hester." Four full-time journalists provide frequent local news updates.

== History ==
=== Early years ===
On November 22, 1947, the station first signed on as KFSB. The call sign stood for the original owner, Four States Broadcasting, Inc. The studios were at 1025 Main Street, with Harry Easley serving as president. From the 1950s through the 90s, the station aired a full-service format of adult contemporary music, news and sports.

In 1997, the station was acquired by Ozark Christian College and featured a Christian radio format of inspirational music and religious teaching programs. The current news/talk format was launched in December 2005, when the station was acquired by Zimmer Radio.

=== May 22, 2011 Tornado ===
KZRG was the station on the air with live storm coverage before, during, and after the Joplin tornado on May 22, 2011, which killed 161 people. The stations of Zimmer Radio, led by KZRG, were on the air around the clock for nine consecutive days with storm recovery information.
