= KIOO =

- Porterville, California; United States
- Broadcast area: Visalia; Tulare; Hanford
- Frequency: 99.7 MHz
- Branding: 99.7 Classic Rock

Programming
- Format: Classic rock
- Affiliations: Westwood One

Ownership
- Owner: Momentum Broadcasting LP
- Sister stations: KCRZ, KJUG-FM, KVMI

History
- First air date: August 1, 1972
- Call sign meaning: K-100 (former branding)

Technical information
- Licensing authority: FCC
- Facility ID: 7708
- Class: B
- ERP: 25,000 watts
- HAAT: 214 meters (702 ft)
- Transmitter coordinates: 36°6′26.00″N 119°1′45.00″W

Links
- Public license information: Public file; LMS
- Webcast: Listen live
- Website: 997classicrock.com

KIOO (99.7 FM) is a commercial radio station licensed to Porterville, California, United States, and serving the Visalia-Tulare-Hanford area of Central California. It airs a classic rock format and is owned by Momentum Broadcasting LP. The studios are on East Mineral King Avenue.

== History ==
KIOO signed on the air on August 1, 1972. It was the sister station of KTIP 1450 AM. In its early years, KIOO aired an automated beautiful music format, featuring instrumental cover versions of popular adult songs.
