= KTJS =

- Hobart, Oklahoma; United States
- Broadcast area: Southwest Oklahoma
- Frequency: 1420 kHz
- Branding: Great Plains Country

Programming
- Format: Country music

Ownership
- Owner: Fuchs Radio, LLC
- Sister stations: KTIJ, KHIM, KJCM, KHWL

Technical information
- Licensing authority: FCC
- Facility ID: 22821
- Class: B
- Power: 1,000 watts day; 360 watts night
- Transmitter coordinates: 35.04917°N 99.09667°W
- Translator: 102.1 K271CZ (Hobart)

Links
- Public license information: Public file; LMS
- Website: foxradiook.com

KTJS 1420 AM is a radio station licensed to Hobart, Oklahoma. The station broadcasts a country music format and is owned by Fuchs Radio, LLC.
