= KHYZ =

Radio station in Mountain Pass, California, United States

- Mountain Pass, California; United States
- Broadcast area: Las Vegas Valley
- Frequency: 99.7 MHz (HD Radio)
- Branding: Revolution 99.7

Programming
- Format: Dance radio
- Subchannels: HD2: "Detox"; HD3: Active rock "Pure Rock KNAC" (KNAC)

Ownership
- Owner: Marco Mazzoli; (ANCO Media Group LLC)
- Sister stations: KIXW-FM; KIXF; KRXV; KHWY

History
- First air date: February 5, 1980
- Former call signs: KXVR (1979–1992)
- Call sign meaning: "Highways" (former branding)

Technical information
- Licensing authority: FCC
- Facility ID: 34555
- Class: B
- ERP: 8,400 watts
- HAAT: 695 meters (2,280 ft)
- Transmitter coordinates: 35°29′27″N 115°33′27″W
- Repeaters: 99.7 KHYZ-FM2 (Las Vegas); 98.9 KHWY (Essex)

Links
- Public license information: Public file; LMS
- Website: www.revolution997.com; HD2: www.revolutiondancenetwork.com/detoxradio

KHYZ (99.7 FM) is a radio station, licensed to Mountain Pass, California, and serving the Las Vegas, Nevada area. It broadcasts a dance radio format branded as "Revolution 99.7". The station is owned by Marco Mazzoli's ANCO Media Group, with studios at Pawn Plaza on South Las Vegas Boulevard in Las Vegas.

== History ==
The station originally launched in 1980 as KXVR, as part of a simulcast with KRXV in Yermo that sought to provide coverage along the Mojave Desert corridor of Interstate 15. The stations' format would primarily target drivers traveling to Las Vegas and Laughlin, Nevada from California, with a mix of music and travelers' information, and advertising for resorts, events, and attractions. Morning programming would target Barstow instead.

In June 1992, KXVR changed its call letters to KHYZ. In June 2002, KHYZ moved from 99.5 FM to 99.7 FM, and decreased in power to 8,400 watts.

In June 2009, KHYZ added a booster signal in Las Vegas to improve its coverage in the city itself. KHYZ later relocated its main transmitter and increased the power to 50,000 Watts.

On October 5, 2023, KHYZ broke away from the Highway Vibe trimulcast (which by then was carrying an hot adult contemporary format), and flipped to dance radio as Vibe 99.7. The new format is programmed by the former staff of KGHD-LD Acid 87.7 (which concurrently relaunched its own dance format with new management). KRXV and KHWY continue to air on 99.7 via an HD Radio subchannel.

On February 12, 2025, KHYZ's HD3 subchannel changed their format from financial news to a simulcast of KHDR's active rock Highway Rock programming.

In January 2026, the HD2 subchannel flipped to a promotional stunt format programmed by local Internet service provider ISP.net, which carried AI-generated parody songs with networking-related themes (such as "Smells Like Low Latency" and "Don't Fear The Outage") meant to promote the company's services. The ISP had operated the microwave links for the Highway Stations and provided an Internet backbone for KHYZ's current programming, and was offered the ability to program one of the channels. ISP.net explained the stunt by proclaiming KHYZ-HD2 to be a station that "cut the clutter, the DJ banter, and the art, leaving only what you crave: unadulterated, non-stop promotion of our service offerings."

In December 2025, it was announced that Marco Mazzoli (via ANCO Media Group)—owner of WZFL in Miami—would acquire most of the Heftel Broadcasting Company stations, including KHYZ. The sale excludes KHDR/KNAC, which is partially owned by Point Broadcasting.

The acquisition was completed in May 2026. On May 11, 2026, KHYZ rebranded as "Revolution 99.7" with no change in format, matching the branding used by its sister stations. KHYZ-HD2 also flipped to "Detox", a deep house-centric spin-off of the main Revolution format.

In August 2026, KHYZ began simulcasting on KHWY, which had been a KRXV simulcast until then.
