= KCRZ =

- Tipton, California; United States
- Broadcast area: Visalia; Fresno; Tulare; Porterville
- Frequency: 104.9 MHz
- Branding: Hitz 104.9

Programming
- Format: Contemporary hits

Ownership
- Owner: Momentum Broadcasting
- Sister stations: KIOO, KJUG-FM, KVMI

History
- First air date: 1997
- Former call signs: KQIQ-FM (1995, CP); KZZC (1995–1997, CP)
- Call sign meaning: Cruizin' (previous branding)

Technical information
- Licensing authority: FCC
- Facility ID: 37015
- Class: A
- ERP: 3,100 watts
- HAAT: 141 meters (463 ft)
- Transmitter coordinates: 36.169°N 119.252°W

Links
- Public license information: Public file; LMS
- Webcast: Listen live
- Website: hitz1049.com

KCRZ (104.9 FM) is commercial radio station licensed to Tipton, California, United States, and serving the Central California cities of Visalia, Fresno, Tulare and Porterville. It airs a contemporary hit radio format and is owned by Momentum Broadcasting. The studios are on East Mineral King Avenue in Visalia.

== History ==
The station signed on the air in 1997.

As of May 2013, the station rebranded from "Z104.9" to "Hitz 104.9" and added syndicated programs to its lineup, including Elvis Duran and the Morning Show which aired until August 2024 when it was replaced with a local morning show.

== Previous logo ==
(KCRZ's logo under previous "Z104.9" branding)
