= WPAK (AM) =

- Farmville, Virginia; United States
- Broadcast area: Farmville, Virginia; Northern Prince Edward County, Virginia; Southern Cumberland County, Virginia
- Frequency: 1490 kHz
- Branding: Cross Country 94.5 FM

Programming
- Format: Positive Country

Ownership
- Owner: Emory F. Bearden; (White Pine Enterprises, Inc.)

History
- First air date: 1978

Technical information
- Licensing authority: FCC
- Facility ID: 24456
- Class: C
- Power: 1,000 watts day and night
- Transmitter coordinates: 37°18′47.0″N 78°23′41.0″W
- Translator: (99.9 MHz) W260DJ (Farmville)

Links
- Public license information: Public file; LMS
- Webcast: WPAK Webstream
- Website: WPAK Online

WPAK (1490 AM) is an American Positive Country formatted broadcast radio station licensed to Farmville, Virginia, serving Farmville, Northern Prince Edward County, Virginia, and Southern Cumberland County, Virginia. WPAK is owned by Emory F. Bearden, through licensee White Pine Enterprises, Inc.

== Programming ==
WPAK simulcasts WRMV-LP located in Madison Heights, Virginia.
