= KJTH =

Christian radio station in Ponca City, Oklahoma

- Ponca City, Oklahoma; United States
- Broadcast area: Oklahoma City
- Frequency: 89.7 MHz (HD Radio)
- Branding: The House FM

Programming
- Format: Christian contemporary hit radio
- Subchannels: HD2: KLVV (Contemporary Christian music)

Ownership
- Owner: The Love Station, Inc.
- Sister stations: KLVV, KIXO

History
- First air date: October 12, 2004
- Call sign meaning: Contains The House (FM)

Technical information
- Licensing authority: FCC
- Facility ID: 81146
- Class: C0
- ERP: 100,000 watts
- HAAT: 307 meters (1,007 ft)
- Transmitter coordinates: 36°35′42″N 97°34′38″W

Links
- Public license information: Public file; LMS
- Webcast: thehousefm.com
- Website: thehousefm.com

KJTH (89.7 FM) is a non-commercial, educational radio station licensed to serve the community of Ponca City, Oklahoma, United States. It currently airs a Christian contemporary format.

== History ==
KZTH was on April 11, 2018. KTHF was on July 30, 2010. KXTH was on October 23, 2003. KTHL was on December 11, 2010. KIXO was on October 5, 2018. KTHM was on October 23, 2018. K261DR was on August 9, 2010. K289AU was in May 2005. K290DP was on November 9, 2009. K233CR was on April 15, 2014. K232ET was on September 24, 2014. K269GL was on September 7, 2016.

== Repeaters and translators ==
The House FM is also heard in the Oklahoma City metropolitan area on 88.5 KZTH, in the Elk City, Oklahoma area on 89.9 KTHF, in the Seminole, Oklahoma area on 89.1 KXTH, the Altus, Oklahoma area on 89.3 KTHL, Sulphur, Oklahoma area on 106.1 KIXO, and Waynoka, Oklahoma area on 94.1 KTHM, as well as eight low powered translators. As part of an effort to increase signal in and around Oklahoma City, KTST-HD2 switched their signal from sister station KLVV in 2021.

Call sign	Frequency	City of license	State	Facility ID	Class	ERP (W)	Height (m (ft))
KTHL	89.3 FM	Altus	Oklahoma	177048	A	1,500	77 m (253 ft)
KTHF	89.9 FM	Hammon	Oklahoma	177198	C2	26,500	90 m (300 ft)
KTST-HD2	101.9-2 FM	Oklahoma City	Oklahoma	58390	C0	100,000	372 m (1,220 ft)
KZTH	88.5 FM	Piedmont	Oklahoma	83880	C1	50,000	182 m (597 ft)
KXTH	89.1 FM	Seminole	Oklahoma	85076	A	2,600	115 m (377 ft)
KIXO	106.1 FM	Sulphur	Oklahoma	9942	A	2,650	152 m (499 ft)
KTHM	94.1 FM	Waynoka	Oklahoma	191543	C3	9,800	122 m (400 ft)

Broadcast translators of KJTH
Call sign	Frequency (MHz)	City of license	State	Facility ID	Class	ERP (W)	Height (m (ft))
K261DR	100.1	Wichita	Kansas	14455	D	250	89.4 m (293 ft)
K289AU	105.7	Bartlesville	Oklahoma	153233	D	250	39.6 m (130 ft)
K269GL	101.7	Lawton	Oklahoma	141962	D	62	157 m (515 ft)
K233CR	94.5	Pawhuska	Oklahoma	142084	D	250	87.7 m (288 ft)
K232ET	94.3	Shawnee	Oklahoma	142074	D	99	117 m (384 ft)
K232GC	94.3	Moore	Oklahoma	141592	D	250	166 m (545 ft)
K290BP	105.9	Stillwater	Oklahoma	51938	D	250	83 m (272 ft)
K261DP	100.1	Edmond	Oklahoma	83195	D	99	133.7 m (439 ft)
