= KTUN =

- New Castle, Colorado; United States
- Broadcast area: Grand Junction metropolitan area
- Frequency: 94.5 MHz

Programming
- Language: Spanish
- Format: Hits

Ownership
- Owner: Patricia MacDonald Garber and Peter Benedetti; (Alwaysmountaintime, LLC)

History
- First air date: 2005
- Former call signs: KCUV-FM (2005); KJEB (2005–2009)

Technical information
- Licensing authority: FCC
- Facility ID: 164290
- Class: C3
- ERP: 25,000 watts
- HAAT: −121 meters (−397 ft)
- Transmitter coordinates: 39.566°N 107.534°W

Links
- Public license information: Public file; LMS

KTUN (94.5 FM) is a radio station broadcasting a Spanish hits format. Licensed to New Castle, Colorado, United States, the station serves the Grand Junction Metropolitan Statistical Area. The station is currently owned by Patricia MacDonald Garber and Peter Benedetti, through licensee Alwaysmountaintime, LLC.
