= KHDR =

Radio station in Lenwood, California

KNAC and KHDR

KNAC: Lenwood, California; KHDR: Baker, California; United States
- Broadcast area: High Desert
- Frequencies: KNAC: 96.9 MHz; KHDR: 94.9 MHz
- Branding: Pure Rock KNAC

Programming
- Format: Active rock
- Affiliations: Premiere Networks; Las Vegas Raiders; Vegas Golden Knights

Ownership
- Owner: Richard Heftel (67.7%); Point Broadcasting (32.3%); (The Drive LLC)

History
- First air date: KNAC: 2002; KHDR: 2002
- Former call signs: KNAC: KKLK (2000–2002); KHDR (2002–2025); KHDR: KKBK (2000–2002); KHRQ (2002–2025); KNAC (2025)
- Call sign meaning: KNAC: Tribute to the former KNAC in Los Angeles; KHDR: "Highway Drive" (former branding)

Technical information
- Licensing authority: FCC
- Facility ID: KNAC: 89344; KHDR: 89128
- Class: KNAC: A; KHDR: B1
- ERP: KNAC: 1,000 watts; KHDR: 1,450 watts
- HAAT: KNAC: 244 meters (801 ft); KHDR: 404 meters (1,325 ft)
- Transmitter coordinates: KNAC: 34°58′15″N 117°2′23″W; KHDR: 35°26′10″N 115°55′25″W

Links
- Public license information: KNAC: Public file; LMS; KHDR: Public file; LMS
- Webcast: Listen live
- Website: www.knacfm.com

KNAC (96.9 FM) and KHDR (94.9 FM) are radio stations licensed to Lenwood and Baker, California. Owned by The Drive, LLC, a joint venture between Heftel Broadcasting Company and Point Broadcasting, they broadcast an active rock format branded as Pure Rock KNAC. Similarly to sister station KRXV, the stations serve the Interstate 15 and Interstate 40 corridors, targeting travelers from California to Las Vegas and Laughlin, Nevada.

== History ==
Both stations signed on in 2002 as "The Drive", with the call signs KHDR on 96.9 and KHRQ on 94.9. In 2004, KHWZ (100.1 FM) in Ludlow, California, which had previously carried Highway Country, switched to "The Drive". KHWZ went silent on February 25, 2011.

In early 2017, parent company KHWY, Inc. filed for chapter 11 bankruptcy, and the Highway Stations — KHDR and KHRQ, plus The Highway Vibe (KRXV, KHWY, KHYZ) and Highway Country (KIXW-FM, KIXF) — were put up for auction. Heftel Broadcasting won the auction with a $620,000 bid, with Educational Media Foundation having offered $525,000 for just KRXV and KHYZ. Point Broadcasting would maintain a 32.3% minority stake in the stations.

In 2018, the Drive stations switched formats from mainstream rock to adult hits. On December 26, 2020, the stations returned to rock.

Previous logo

Syndicated programming on KHDR and KHRQ included, by February 8, 2021, The Woody Show weekday mornings. The Drive stations are affiliates of the Vegas Golden Knights radio network. One of KHDR's syndicated shows (by March 2024) was Highway Rock, hosted by former KNAC DJ Gonzo Greg. Similar to KNAC, it broadcast musical genres ranging from classic rock to hard rock and heavy metal music.

On February 12, 2025, KHDR and KHRQ rebranded as "Highway Rock" and began simulcasting on KHYZ's HD3 subchannel. Branding during this period emphasized the subchannel, which serves the Las Vegas area.

Logo of KNAC.COM (a precursor to KNAC.FM) on display in Westchester, Los Angeles, California (2026)

On August 6, 2025, KHRQ changed its call letters to KNAC in tribute to the original KNAC in Los Angeles, and the stations held a "Pure Rock Rewind" weekend of classic 1980s and 1990s rock over the Labor Day holiday to promote the change. The KNAC and KHDR call signs were swapped a month later. In October 2025, the stations announced that they would rebrand as "Pure Rock KNAC" (also known as KNAC.FM) on October 31, 2025.

== See also ==
- Highway Country
- The Highway Vibe
- Vibe 99.7
