= KWTY =

Coordinates: 36°19′16″N 118°01′22″W

- Cartago, California; United States
- Broadcast area: Olancha, California
- Frequency: 94.5 MHz

Programming
- Format: Defunct

History
- First air date: 1996

Technical information
- Licensing authority: FCC
- Facility ID: 41590
- Class: B1
- ERP: 2,000 watts
- HAAT: −545 meters (−1,788 ft)

Links
- Public license information: Public file; LMS

KWTY was an FM radio station that was licensed to Cartago, California and broadcast on the 94.5 MHz frequency. At the time the station's license expired, KWTY was owned by Robert Adelman, through licensee Adelman Broadcasting Inc.

== History ==
KWTY first signed on in November 1989 with a talk radio format.

In July 2011, Mark A. Miller sold the then-silent KWTY to Sunset Media for $110,000. In August 2013, Sunset Media transferred control of the station to Desert Valley Federal Credit Union for one dollar to stall foreclosure on a note; the transaction closed the following February. Adelman Broadcasting purchased KWTY from the credit union for $20,000 in March 2014. The station remained silent under each owner.

On October 27, 2015, the license of KWTY expired and was cancelled by the Federal Communications Commission (FCC) pursuant to Section 312(g) of the agency's rules and regulations. The licensee, Adelman Broadcasting, failed to resume operations and the KWTY call letters were deleted from the FCC database.
