= KBFE-LP =

- Bakersfield, California; United States
- Frequency: 94.5 MHz

History
- First air date: May 26, 2015

Technical information
- Licensing authority: FCC
- Facility ID: 192328
- Class: L1
- ERP: 91 watts
- HAAT: 31.7 meters (104 ft)
- Transmitter coordinates: 35°22′37.60″N 119°03′2.10″W

Links
- Public license information: LMS

KBFE-LP is a low power radio station in Bakersfield, California.

== History ==
KBFE-LP began broadcasting on May 26, 2015.
