= KHIM =

- Mangum, Oklahoma; United States
- Broadcast area: Southwest Oklahoma
- Frequency: 97.7 MHz
- Branding: Classic Hits 97.7

Programming
- Format: Classic hits

Ownership
- Owner: Fuchs Radio L.L.C.
- Sister stations: KTIJ, KTJS, KJCM, KHWL

History
- First air date: 1998

Technical information
- Licensing authority: FCC
- Facility ID: 85874
- Class: C3
- ERP: 2,250 watts
- HAAT: 329 meters (1,079 ft)
- Transmitter coordinates: 34°58′39″N 99°24′35″W

Links
- Public license information: Public file; LMS
- Webcast: Listen live
- Website: foxradiook.com

KHIM (97.7 FM) is a radio station licensed to Mangum, Oklahoma. The station broadcasts a classic hits format and is owned by Fuchs Radio L.L.C.
