= KWNE =

- Ukiah, California; United States
- Frequency: 94.5 MHz
- Branding: K-Wine 94.5

Programming
- Format: Contemporary hit radio

Ownership
- Owner: Broadcasting Corporation of Mendocino County

History
- First air date: July 30, 1968
- Former call signs: KLIL (1968–1979)
- Call sign meaning: Wine

Technical information
- Licensing authority: FCC
- Facility ID: 7087
- Class: B
- ERP: 2,200 watts
- HAAT: 599 meters (1,965 ft)
- Transmitter coordinates: 39°7′50″N 123°4′32″W
- Translators: 94.1 K231AI (Willits); 94.1 K231AK (Fort Bragg)

Links
- Public license information: Public file; LMS
- Webcast: Listen live
- Website: kwine.com

KWNE (94.5 FM, "K-Wine 94.5") is a radio station licensed to Ukiah, California, United States. The station, launched in 1968 as KLIL, is currently owned by the Broadcasting Corporation of Mendocino County.

KWNE broadcasts a contemporary hit radio format.

The station was assigned the call sign KWNE by the Federal Communications Commission on July 2, 1979.
