= KJMK =

Radio station in Webb City–Joplin, Missouri

Coordinates: 37.243°N 94.506°W

- Webb City, Missouri; United States
- Broadcast area: Joplin, Missouri
- Frequency: 93.9 MHz
- Branding: Classic Hits 93.9

Programming
- Format: Classic hits

Ownership
- Owner: Zimmer Radio, Inc.
- Sister stations: KIXQ, KSYN, KXDG, KZRG, KZYM

History
- First air date: 1984 (as KPBT)
- Former call signs: KPBT (1984–1985); KIXQ (1985–1996)

Technical information
- Licensing authority: FCC
- Facility ID: 71606
- Class: C2
- ERP: 48,000 watts
- HAAT: 154 meters

Links
- Public license information: Public file; LMS
- Webcast: Listen Live
- Website: 939classichits.com

KJMK (93.9 FM) is a classic hits radio station licensed to Webb City, Missouri and broadcasting from Joplin, Missouri, with an effective radiated power of 48,000 watts.

KJMK used to be a part of the family-owned Zimmer Radio Group. The stations were sold in July 2007 to James Zimmer and he created a new company called Zimmer Radio, Inc.

== History ==
This station started out as "KIX 94 FM", a country station. Later, KIX (KIXQ) was moved down the dial to 102.5 FM, replacing another country station, Country KAT (KJKT), at that frequency. The station was relaunched as an AC station, "Magic 93.9". Later, the station transitioned to "Lite Rock 93.9".

On March 2, 2012, KJMK changed their format to classic hits, branded as "Classic Hits 93.9".
