= KVMI =

Radio station in Tulare, California

- Tulare, California; United States
- Broadcast area: Fresno-Visalia-Tulare
- Frequency: 1270 kHz (C-QUAM AM stereo)
- Branding: My 97.5

Programming
- Format: Soft adult contemporary

Ownership
- Owner: Momentum Broadcasting, LP.
- Sister stations: KCRZ, KIOO, KJUG-FM

History
- First air date: January 7, 1946
- Former call signs: KCOK (1946-1987); KFIY (1987–1989) KJUG (1989–2015)
- Former frequencies: 1240 kHz (1946–1949)

Technical information
- Licensing authority: FCC
- Facility ID: 71716
- Class: B
- Power: 5,000 watts (day); 1,000 watts ((night)
- Transmitter coordinates: 36°10′5.8″N 119°15′15.4″W
- Translators: 97.5 K248BX (Visalia); 98.5 K253CI (Exeter)

Links
- Public license information: Public file; LMS
- Webcast: Listen Live
- Website: my975fm.com

KVMI (1270 AM) is a commercial radio station licensed to Tulare, California, United States, and serving the Fresno-Tulare-Visalia area of Central California. Owned by Momentum Broadcasting, LP, the station broadcasts a soft adult contemporary format.

Programming is also heard on FM translators 97.5 K248BX in Visalia and 98.5 K253CI in Exeter.

== History ==
On January 7, 1946, the station signed on as KCOK. It initially transmitted with 250 watts on 1240 kHz. It moved to 1270 kHz in 1949, and increased power to 1,000 watts. In 1963, the station's daytime power was increased to 5,000 watts.
