= KHYM =

Christian radio station in Copeland, Kansas

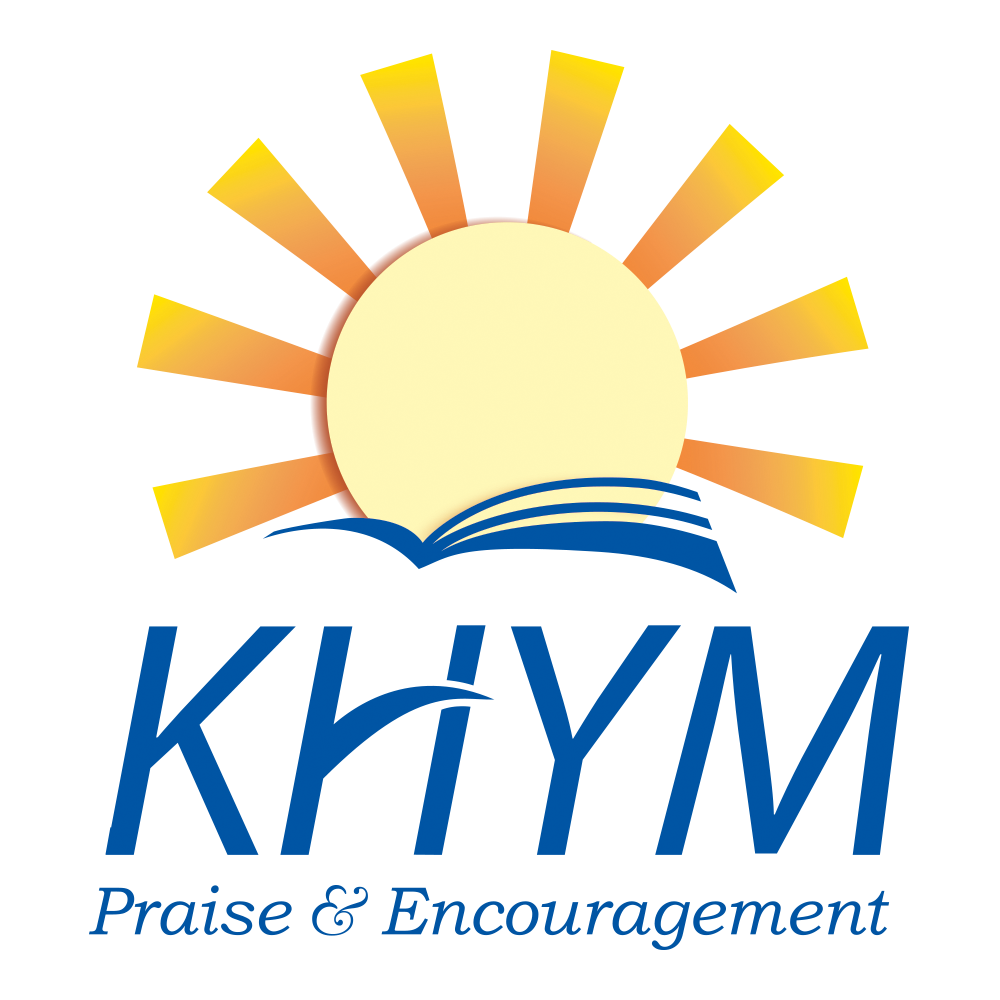
- Copeland, Kansas; United States
- Broadcast area: Dodge City, Kansas; Garden City, Kansas; Liberal, Kansas
- Frequency: 103.9 MHz

Programming
- Format: Christian Music / Christian Talk and Teaching

Ownership
- Owner: Great Plains Christian Radio, Inc.
- Sister stations: KJIL

History
- First air date: December 23, 1997

Technical information
- Licensing authority: FCC
- Facility ID: 81144
- Class: C1
- ERP: 100,000 Watts
- HAAT: 229 meters (751 ft)
- Transmitter coordinates: 37°28′34″N 100°36′01″W

Links
- Public license information: Public file; LMS
- Webcast: Listen Now
- Website: khymfm.org

KHYM is a Christian radio station broadcasting on 103.9 FM, licensed to Copeland, Kansas and serving the areas of Dodge City, Kansas, Garden City, Kansas, and Liberal, Kansas. The station is owned by Great Plains Christian Radio. KHYM began broadcasting December 23, 1997.

The station's format consists primarily of Christian music with midday and evening blocks of Christian talk and teaching. Christian talk and teaching programs heard on KHYM include; In Touch with Dr. Charles Stanley, Back to the Bible, Leading The Way with Michael Youssef, Turning Point with David Jeremiah, Insight For Living with Chuck Swindoll, Focus on the Family.

== Translators ==
KHYM is also heard on translators throughout Kansas, Oklahoma, and Colorado, as well as on full power stations KHYC 91.5 in Scott City, Kansas and KHEV 90.3 in Fairview, Oklahoma.

=== Kansas ===
Call sign	Frequency	City of license	FID	ERP (W)	HAAT	FCC info
KHYC	91.5 FM	Scott City, Kansas	764003	200	56 m (184 ft)	LMS
K297AL	107.3 FM	Dighton, Kansas	142307	170	52.6 m (173 ft)	LMS
K236AM	95.1 FM	Elkhart, Kansas	140879	170	92.2 m (302 ft)	LMS
K219MB	91.7 FM	Hugoton, Kansas	85821	224	20 m (66 ft)	LMS
K223BS	92.5 FM	Ness City, Kansas	33380	150	76.2 m (250 ft)	LMS
K232DH	94.3 FM	Ulysses, Kansas	142279	170	43.6 m (143 ft)	LMS

=== Oklahoma ===
Call sign	Frequency	City of license	FID	ERP (W)	HAAT	FCC info
KHEV	90.3 FM	Fairview, Oklahoma	174874	490	185 m (607 ft)	LMS
K208FI	89.5 FM	Felt, Oklahoma	77526	217	58.1 m (191 ft)	LMS
K203FO	88.5 FM	Guymon, Oklahoma	25695	170	62 m (203 ft)	LMS
K211FI	90.1 FM	Keyes, Oklahoma	34368	240	56.8 m (186 ft)	LMS
K218FM	91.5 FM	Shattuck, Oklahoma	93438	230	32 m (105 ft)	LMS
K210BQ	89.9 FM	Woodward, Oklahoma	24993	75	105 m (344 ft)	LMS

=== Colorado ===
Call sign	Frequency	City of license	FID	ERP (W)	HAAT	Class	FCC info
K220GA	91.9 FM	Lamar, Colorado	83645	182	70 m (230 ft)	D	LMS
