= KJZA =

Public radio station in Drake, Arizona, United States

Coordinates: 35.200°N 112.206°W

- Drake, Arizona; United States
- Frequency: 89.5 (MHz)
- Branding: K-Jazz Radio Network

Programming
- Format: Public radio
- Affiliations: Public Radio International

Ownership
- Owner: En Familia, Inc.

History
- First air date: 2000
- Former call signs: KRTE (2000–2001)

Technical information
- Licensing authority: FCC
- Facility ID: 92985
- Class: C3
- ERP: 250 watts
- HAAT: 770 meters (2,530 ft)
- Translator: 91.3 K217EP (Flagstaff)

Links
- Public license information: Public file; LMS
- Website: KJZA website

KJZA (89.5 MHz) is a public FM radio station in Drake, Arizona, and the originating station in the K-Jazz Radio Network. It primarily features Public Radio International news and information programming with some local talk shows and jazz music nights and weekends. It is simulcast on multiple towers along Interstate 40 through Northern Arizona, from the California border to Flagstaff, Arizona. The K-Jazz Radio Network holds periodic fundraisers and seeks listener donations to support its non-commercial programming.

== History ==
The station signed on in 2000 as KRTE. It broadcasts from Bill Williams Mountain to serve the area around Williams, Arizona. Transmitters in Kingman and Prescott were added in 2009. KJZA simulcasts KOFA 1320 AM in Yuma on weekdays, extending its coverage to Southwest Arizona.

Effective April 12, 2021, St. Paul Bible College sold KJZA, translator K217EP, and two sister stations to En Familia, Inc. for $325,000.

== Transmitters ==
The K-Jazz Network is heard on these additional stations:

Call sign	Frequency	City of license	FID	ERP (W)	Class	FCC info
KJZK	90.7 FM	Kingman, Arizona	173030	30	A	LMS
KJZP	90.1 FM	Prescott, Arizona	173032	27	A	LMS
K217EP	91.3 FM	Flagstaff, Arizona	122167	10	D	LMS
