= KGLC =

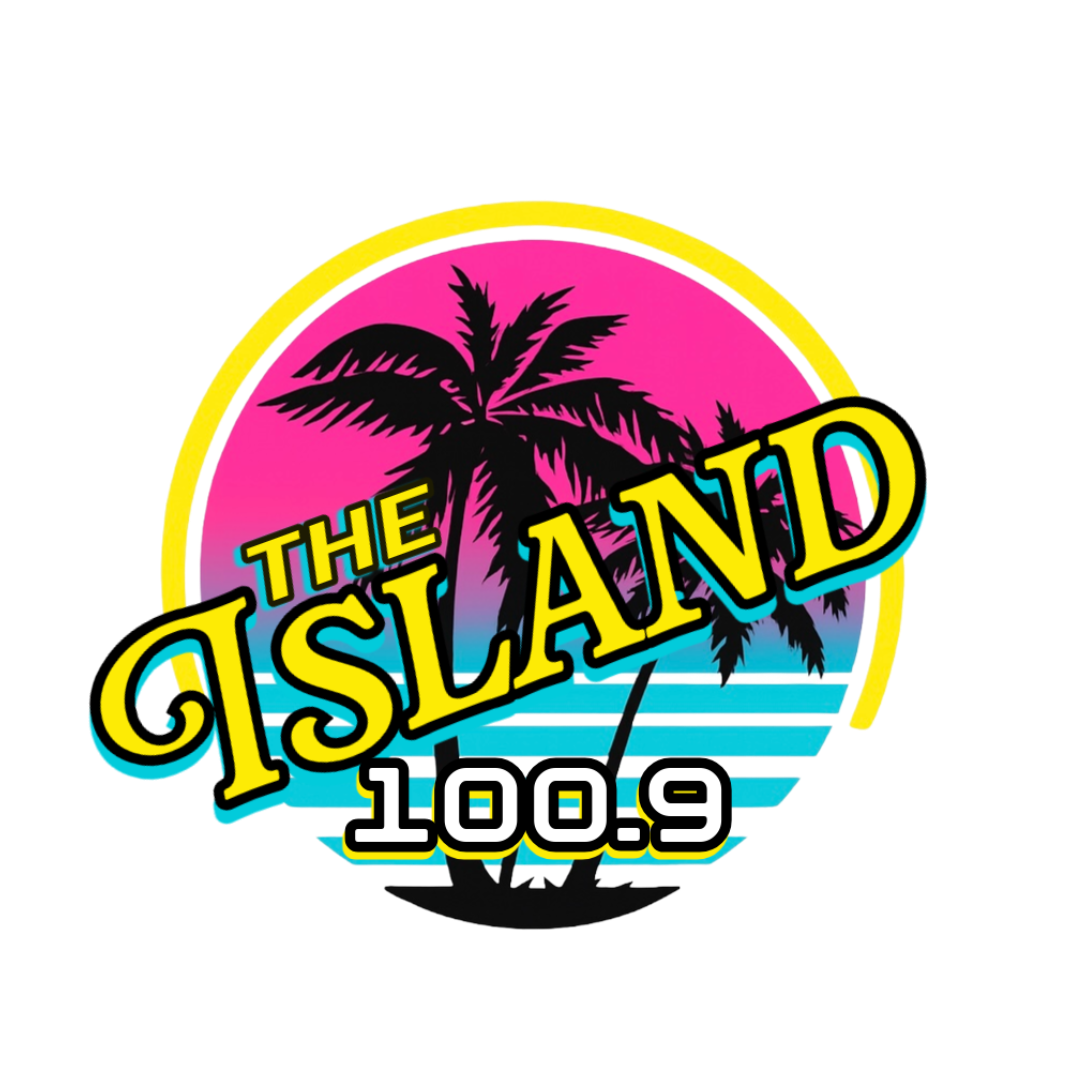
- Miami, Oklahoma; United States
- Frequency: 100.9 MHz
- Branding: The Island 100.9

Programming
- Format: Soft adult contemporary

Ownership
- Owner: (Hooked Broadcasting)
- Sister stations: KVIS, KGVE

History
- First air date: December 1975 (as KORS)
- Former call signs: KORS (1975–1981); KSSM (1981–1991)

Technical information
- Licensing authority: FCC
- Facility ID: 17691
- Class: A
- ERP: 6,000 watts
- HAAT: 84 meters (276 ft)
- Transmitter coordinates: 36°53′24″N 94°47′8″W

Links
- Public license information: Public file; LMS
- Webcast: Listen Live
- Website: 1009theisland.com

KGLC (100.9 FM) is a radio station licensed to Miami, Oklahoma, United States. The station is currently owned by Howard Nunnelly, Hooked Broadcasting, LLC. The station airs an adult contemporary format.

== History ==
This station was assigned call sign KGLC on March 7, 1991. KORS on January 1, 1979 and KSSM on November 25, 1981. Their slogan was "Radio on the Route".
