= KJCM =

- Snyder, Oklahoma; United States
- Frequency: 100.3 MHz
- Branding: The Sports Animal

Programming
- Format: Sports
- Affiliations: ESPN Radio

Ownership
- Owner: Fuchs Radio L.L.C.
- Sister stations: KTIJ; KTJS; KHIM; KHWL

History
- First air date: 1999
- Former call signs: KBKF (1998–1999, CP)

Technical information
- Licensing authority: FCC
- Facility ID: 76352
- Class: C3
- ERP: 18,000 watts
- HAAT: 117 meters (384 ft)
- Transmitter coordinates: 34°38′42″N 99°5′3″W
- Translator: 94.7 K234BD (Lawton)

Links
- Public license information: Public file; LMS
- Website: foxradiook.com

KJCM (100.3 FM) is a radio station licensed to Snyder, Oklahoma, United States. The station broadcasts a sports format and is owned by Fuchs Radio L.L.C.

== Translators ==
Broadcast translator for KJCM
| Call sign | Frequency | City of license | FID | ERP (W) | HAAT | Class | FCC info |
|---|---|---|---|---|---|---|---|
| K234BD | 94.7 FM | Lawton, Oklahoma | 157028 | 240 | 46.5 m (153 ft) | D | LMS |

== Previous logo ==
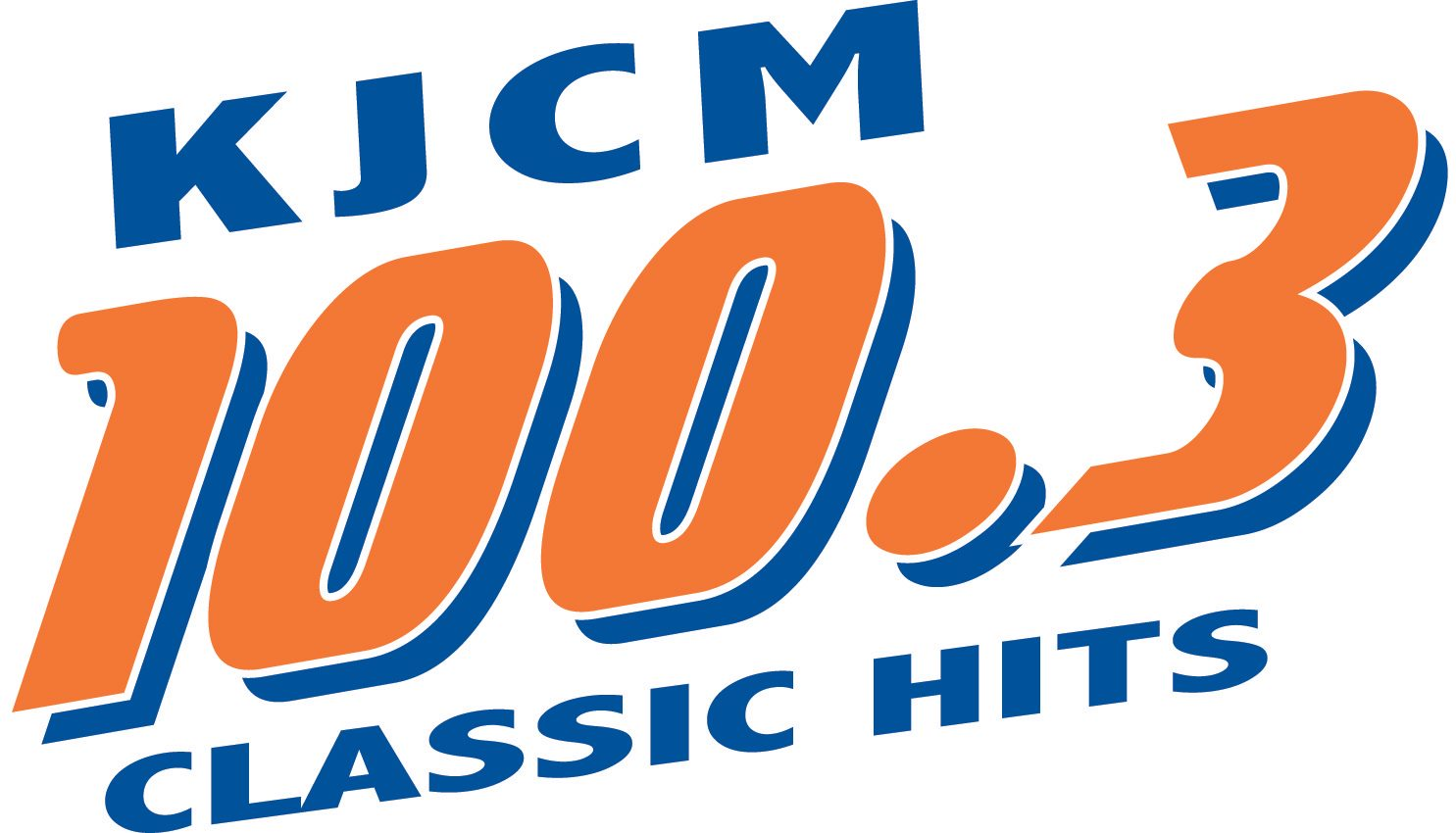
