= WJZD-FM =

Coordinates: 30.434°N 89.036°W

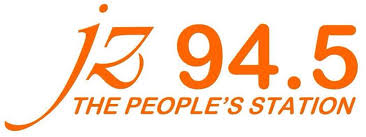
- Long Beach, Mississippi; United States
- Broadcast area: Biloxi-Gulfport-Pascagoula
- Frequency: 94.5 MHz
- Branding: jz 94.5

Programming
- Language: English
- Format: Urban contemporary
- Affiliations: Premiere Networks

Ownership
- Owner: WJZD, Incorporated

History
- Former call signs: WWUB (1992–1993)

Technical information
- Licensing authority: FCC
- Facility ID: 4342
- Class: A
- ERP: 6,000 watts
- HAAT: 98 meters (322 ft)

Links
- Public license information: Public file; LMS
- Webcast: Listen Live
- Website: wjzd.com

WJZD-FM (94.5 MHz), known as "JZ 94.5", is a commercial radio station licensed to Long Beach, Mississippi, and serving the Biloxi-Gulfport-Pascagoula radio market. It broadcasts an urban contemporary radio format and is owned by WJZD, Incorporated. It is the only black-owned FM station on the Mississippi Gulf Coast.

WJZD-FM is a Class A FM station. It has an effective radiated power (ERP) of 6,000 watts. The studios and transmitter are on Southpark Drive in Gulfport.

== Programming ==
Weekdays begin with the syndicated Rickey Smiley Show. On weekday afternoons, the station carries the D.L. Hughley Show. In late mornings, a local talk, news and music program is heard, It's A New Day, with Rip Daniels & Rowe Evans.
