= KHWL =

- Lone Wolf, Oklahoma; United States
- Broadcast area: Altus, Oklahoma
- Frequency: 98.7 MHz
- Branding: 98.7 Red Dirt Rebel

Programming
- Format: Red Dirt

Ownership
- Owner: Chad and Shelley Fox; (Fuchs Radio LLC)
- Sister stations: KHIM, KTJS, KTIJ, KJCM

History
- First air date: 2012
- Call sign meaning: K-Howl (Previous branding)

Technical information
- Licensing authority: FCC
- Facility ID: 189529
- Class: A
- ERP: 750 watts
- HAAT: 284 meters (932 ft)
- Transmitter coordinates: 34.87083°N 99.29333°W

Links
- Public license information: Public file; LMS
- Webcast: Listen live
- Website: foxradiook.com

KHWL is a radio station airing a red dirt music format licensed to Lone Wolf, Oklahoma, broadcasting on 98.7 FM. The station serves the Altus, Oklahoma area, and is owned by Chad and Shelley Fox, through licensee Fuchs Radio LLC.

== History ==
KHWL was first licensed in 2012 and was owned by Wolfpack Media LLC. It originally aired an active rock format, and was branded "K-HOWL 98.7". The station played hard rock, death metal and an eclectic mix of music enjoyed by very loyal listeners. Effective December 1, 2018, the station was sold to Fuchs Radio for $60,000. Its new owners changed its format to news/talk, as "News Radio 98.7". On June 4, 2020, KHWL switched to a red dirt music format, branded as "98.7 Red Dirt Rebel."

Logo as K-HOWL
