= KLVV =

- Ponca City, Oklahoma; United States
- Frequency: 88.7 MHz (HD Radio via KJTH-HD2)
- Branding: The House Of Praise

Programming
- Format: Contemporary Christian

Ownership
- Owner: The Love Station, Inc.
- Sister stations: KJTH, KIXO

History
- First air date: December 21, 1992
- Call sign meaning: "Love"

Technical information
- Licensing authority: FCC
- Facility ID: 65922
- Class: C3
- ERP: 11,500 watts
- HAAT: 146 meters (479 ft)
- Transmitter coordinates: 36°41′25″N 97°10′20″W
- Repeaters: KGVV 90.5 Goltry, OK; K297AZ 107.3 Stillwater, OK; K253BC 98.5 Enid, OK

Links
- Public license information: Public file; LMS
- Webcast: Listen live
- Website: mypraisefm.com

KLVV (88.7 FM, "The House Of Praise") is a radio station broadcasting a contemporary Christian music format. Licensed to Ponca City, Oklahoma, United States, the station is currently owned by The Love Station, Inc.

== History ==
KGVV was on air on April 27, 2012. K297AZ was on air on November 9, 2009. KTST was on air on September 7, 2016, until 2021.

== Translators ==
KLVV is also heard on KGVV 90.5 in Goltry, Oklahoma, as well as a translator on 107.3 in Stillwater, Oklahoma and 98.5 in Enid, Oklahoma. KLVV was also heard on KTST-HD2 in Oklahoma City, Oklahoma until 2021 when it switched to sister station KJTH.

Call sign	Frequency	City of license	FID	ERP (W)	Class	FCC info
KGVV	90.5 FM	Goltry, Oklahoma	177142	14,000	C3	LMS
K297AZ	107.3 FM	Stillwater, Oklahoma	10075	200	D	LMS
K253BC	98.5 FM	Enid, Oklahoma	51936	250	D	LMS

Station's former logo
