= KIXO =

- Sulphur, Oklahoma; United States
- Broadcast area: Pauls Valley, Oklahoma
- Frequency: 106.1 MHz

Programming
- Format: Christian Contemporary

Ownership
- Owner: The Love Station, Inc.
- Sister stations: KJTH, KLVV

Technical information
- Licensing authority: FCC
- Facility ID: 9942
- Class: A
- ERP: 2,650 watts
- HAAT: 152 meters (499 ft)
- Transmitter coordinates: 34.65083°N 96.99000°W
- Translator: 94.3 K232GC (Ada)

Links
- Public license information: Public file; LMS
- Webcast: Listen live
- Website: thehousefm.com

KIXO (106.1 FM) is a radio station licensed to Sulphur, Oklahoma. The station broadcasts a Christian Contemporary format, through licensee The Love Station, Inc. Started playing The House on October 5, 2018.

Station's former logo
