= KGVE =

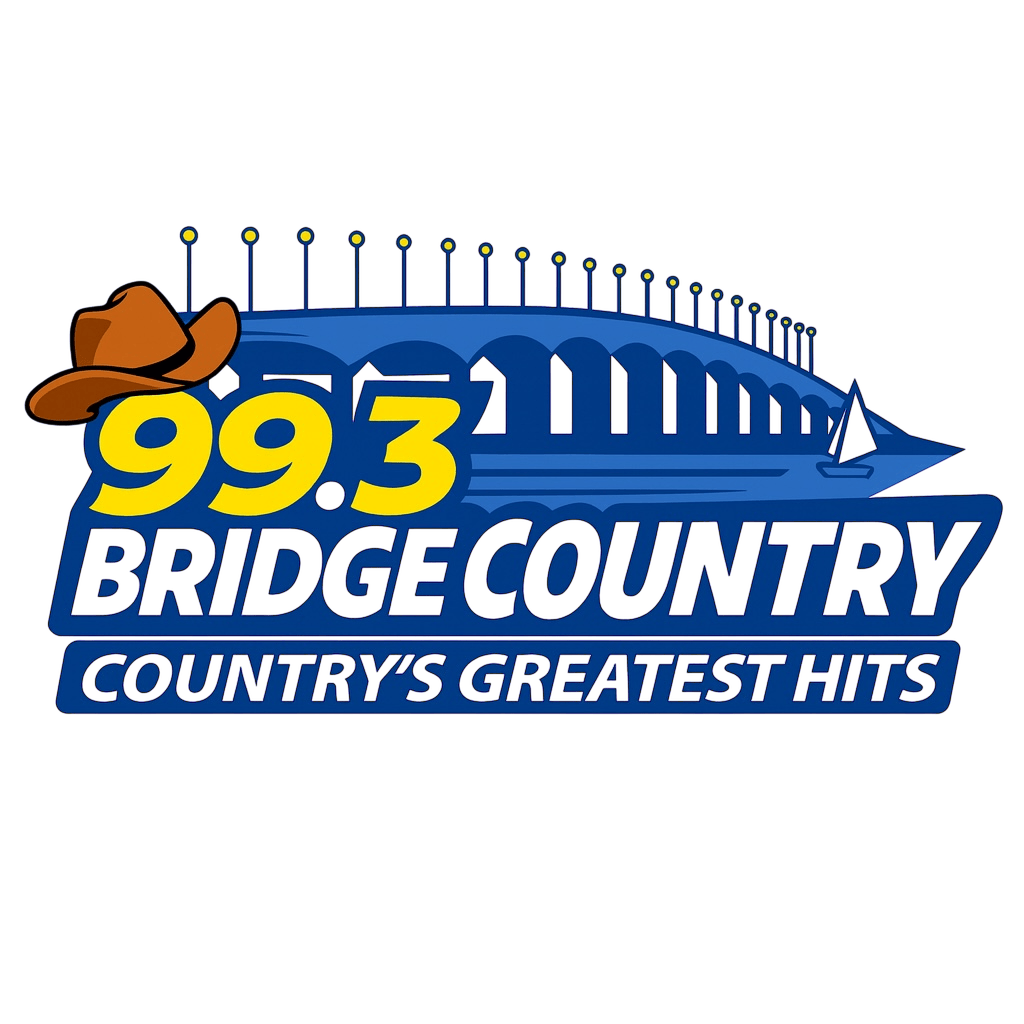
- Grove, Oklahoma; United States
- Broadcast area: Grove, Oklahoma; Miami, Oklahoma; Vinita, Oklahoma
- Frequency: 99.3 MHz
- Branding: 99.3 The Bridge Country's Greatest Hits

Programming
- Format: Country music

Ownership
- Owner: (Hooked Broadcasting)
- Sister stations: KVIS, KGLC

Technical information
- Licensing authority: FCC
- Facility ID: 8184
- Class: C3
- ERP: 14,500 watts
- HAAT: 131 meters (430 ft)
- Transmitter coordinates: 36°41′3.30″N 94°53′11.80″W

Links
- Public license information: Public file; LMS
- Webcast: Listen live
- Website: okradiostation.com

KGVE (99.3 FM) is a radio station licensed to Grove, Oklahoma. The station broadcasts a country music format. The station is currently owned by Howard Nunnelly, Hooked Broadcasting, LLC.
