= KGRD =

- Orchard, Nebraska; United States
- Frequency: 105.3 MHz
- Branding: Good News Radio

Programming
- Format: Christian and CCM
- Affiliations: SRN News

Ownership
- Owner: The Praise Network, Inc.

History
- First air date: June 14, 1987

Technical information
- Licensing authority: FCC
- Facility ID: 66274
- Class: C1
- ERP: 100,000 watts
- HAAT: 153 meters (502 ft)
- Transmitter coordinates: 42°20′45″N 98°25′5″W

Links
- Public license information: Public file; LMS
- Webcast: Listen live
- Website: goodnewsgreatmusic.org

KGRD (105.3 FM) is a Christian radio station licensed to Orchard, Nebraska. It is owned by The Praise Network, Inc.

KGRD airs Christian Contemporary music, as well as a variety of Christian Talk and Teaching programs including; Insight for Living with Chuck Swindoll, Turning Point with David Jeremiah, Focus on the Family, Break Point with Chuck Colson, and Unshackled!.

== Translators ==
KGRD is also heard on five full powered stations, KPNO 90.9 in Norfolk, Nebraska, KGKD 90.5 in Columbus, Nebraska, KGRJ 89.9 in Chamberlain, South Dakota, KGRH 88.1 in the Mitchell, South Dakota area, and KGRU 89.5 in Burwell, Nebraska, as well as three translators in Northern Nebraska and Southern South Dakota.

Call sign	Frequency	City of license	FID	ERP (W)	HAAT	Class	FCC info
KPNO	90.9 FM	Norfolk, Nebraska	66272	100,000	103 m (338 ft)	C1	LMS
KGKD	90.5 FM	Columbus, Nebraska	172512	10,000	170 m (558 ft)	C2	LMS
KGRJ	89.9 FM	Chamberlain, South Dakota	172515	21,500	78 m (256 ft)	C3	LMS
KGRH	88.1 FM	Loomis, South Dakota	177168	350	67 m (220 ft)	A	LMS
KGRU	89.5 FM	Burwell, Nebraska	767458	1,000	61 m (200 ft)	A	LMS
K217CT	91.3 FM	Ainsworth, Nebraska	86504	222	78 m (256 ft)	D	LMS
K220FV	91.9 FM	Yankton, South Dakota	81221	140	86 m (282 ft)	D	LMS
K222AL	92.3 FM	Platte, South Dakota	86756	75	129 m (423 ft)	D	LMS
