= WRMV-LP =

- Madison Heights, Virginia; United States
- Broadcast area: Lynchburg, Virginia
- Frequency: 94.5 MHz
- Branding: Cross Country 94.5 FM

Programming
- Format: Positive Country

Ownership
- Owner: Fellowship Community Church and Christian Schools

History
- First air date: May 23, 2003
- Call sign meaning: W Radio Madison (Heights) Virginia

Technical information
- Licensing authority: FCC
- Facility ID: 126573
- Class: L1
- Power: 96 Watts
- HAAT: 24.8 Meters
- Transmitter coordinates: 37°25′11.0″N 79°7′56.0″W

Links
- Public license information: LMS
- Webcast: WRMV Webstream
- Website: WRMV Online

WRMV-LP (94.5 FM) is a Positive Country formatted broadcast radio station licensed to Madison Heights, Virginia and serving Lynchburg, Virginia. WRMV-LP is owned and operated by Fellowship Community Church and Christian Schools.
