= KJIW-FM =

- Helena, Arkansas; United States
- Broadcast area: Clarksdale, Mississippi; Memphis, Tennessee
- Frequency: 94.5 MHz

Programming
- Format: Gospel music

Ownership
- Owner: Elijah Mondy, Jr.

History
- First air date: 1991
- Call sign meaning: "King Jesus Is Worthy"

Technical information
- Licensing authority: FCC
- Facility ID: 19237
- Class: C2
- ERP: 50,000 watts
- HAAT: 150.0 meters (492.1 ft)
- Transmitter coordinates: 34°43′56″N 90°26′32″W

Links
- Public license information: Public file; LMS
- Webcast: Listen live
- Website: http://www.kjiwfm.com

KJIW-FM (94.5 FM) is a radio station licensed to Helena, Arkansas, United States. The station airs a Gospel music format and is owned by Elijah Mondy, Jr.
