= KIXW-FM =

KIXW-FM and KIXF
KIXW-FM: Lenwood, California; KIXF: Baker, California; United States
- Broadcast area: Barstow, California
- Frequencies: KIXW-FM: 107.3 MHz; KIXF: 101.5 MHz
- Branding: Highway Country 107.3 & 101.5

Programming
- Format: Country

Ownership
- Owner: Marco Mazzoli; (ANCO Media Group, LLC)
- Sister stations: KHWY; KHYZ; KRXV

History
- First air date: KIXW-FM: 1993; KIXF: 1994
- Former call signs: KIXW-FM: KQEH (1992); KIXW (1992–1995); KIXF: KIXA (1992); KBXY (1992)

Technical information
- Licensing authority: FCC
- Facility ID: KIXW-FM: 68413; KIXF: 68412
- Class: KIXW-FM: A; KIXF: B
- ERP: KIXW-FM: 2,250 watts; KIXF: 4,300 watts
- HAAT: KIXW-FM: 165 meters (541 ft); KIXF: 403 meters (1,322 ft)
- Transmitter coordinates: KIXW-FM: 34°51′21.9″N 117°3′2.1″W; KIXF: 35°26′9.9″N 115°55′28″W

Links
- Public license information: KIXW-FM: Public file; LMS; KIXF: Public file; LMS

KIXW-FM (107.3 MHz) is a commercial radio station in Lenwood, California, broadcasting to the eastern section of the High Desert area (including Barstow). It is simulcast on KIXF 101.5 FM in Baker, California. The stations share a country format.

The stations are branded as "Highway Country 107.3 & 101.5" and its target audience consists of travelers on Interstate 15 between Los Angeles and Las Vegas.

KIXW-FM and KIXF were once unified with KIXA in Apple Valley to broadcast "Rock 106.5" across Lenwood, Baker and Barstow in 1998. After "Rock 106.5" was shut down in 2002, Clear Channel Communications sold off KIXW-FM and KIXA to Heftel Broadcasting, and relaunched KIXA as classic rock station "The Fox 106".

== See also ==
- The Drive
- The Highway Vibe
- Vibe 99.7
