= KGEN (AM) =

Radio station in Tulare, California

- Tulare, California; United States
- Frequency: 1370 kHz
- Branding: La Ley 1370 AM

Programming
- Format: Regional Mexican

Ownership
- Owner: Momentum Broadcasting LP

History
- First air date: 1957

Technical information
- Licensing authority: FCC
- Facility ID: 57446
- Class: D
- Power: 710 watts (day); 72 watts (night)
- Transmitter coordinates: 36°12′15.8″N 119°33′56.4″W

Links
- Public license information: Public file; LMS
- Webcast: Listen Live
- Website: www.laley945.com

KGEN (1370 AM) is a radio station broadcasting a Regional Mexican format. Licensed to Tulare, California, United States, the station is owned by Momentum Broadcasting LP.

== History ==
The station had fallen into bankruptcy in the mid-1960s before being acquired by Harry J. Pappas and his brothers Pete and Mike.
