= KJUG-FM =

- Tulare, California; United States
- Broadcast area: Visalia - Tulare - Porterville - Hanford
- Frequency: 106.7 MHz
- Branding: 106.7 K-Jug Country

Programming
- Format: Country

Ownership
- Owner: Momentum Broadcasting, LP
- Sister stations: KCRZ, KIOO, KVMI

History
- First air date: May 6, 1965

Technical information
- Licensing authority: FCC
- Facility ID: 71714
- Class: B
- ERP: 27,100 watts
- HAAT: 146.7 meters (481 ft)
- Transmitter coordinates: 36°14′31.9″N 118°52′23.2″W

Links
- Public license information: Public file; LMS
- Webcast: Listen live
- Website: kjug.com

KJUG-FM (106.7 FM) is a radio station broadcasting a country music format. Licensed to Tulare, California, it also serves the cities of Visalia, Porterville and Hanford. The station is currently owned by Momentum Broadcasting, LP. The studios are on East Mineral King Avenue in Visalia.
