= Loomis, South Dakota =

- CDP
- Location in Davison County and the state of South Dakota
- Coordinates: 43°47′35″N 98°06′17″W
- Country: United States
- State: South Dakota
- County: Davison

Area
  - Total: 0.20 sq mi (0.51 km^{2})
  - Land: 0.20 sq mi (0.51 km^{2})
  - Water: 0 sq mi (0.00 km^{2})
- Elevation: 1,303 ft (397 m)

Population (2020)
  - Total: 33
  - Density: 166.7/sq mi (64.36/km^{2})
- Time zone: UTC-6 (Central (CST))
  - Summer (DST): UTC-5 (CDT)
- ZIP code: 57301
- Area code: 605
- FIPS code: 46-39020
- GNIS feature ID: 2393108

Loomis is a census-designated place (CDP) in Davison County, South Dakota, United States. The population was 33 at the 2020 census. It is part of the Mitchell, South Dakota Micropolitan Statistical Area.

Loomis was laid out in 1902.

== Geography ==
According to the United States Census Bureau, the CDP has a total area of 0.2 square miles (0.52 km^{2}), all land.

== Demographics ==
Historical population
Census	Pop.	Note	%±
2020	33		—
U.S. Decennial Census

As of the census of 2000, there were 47 people, 18 households, and 14 families residing in the CDP. The population density was 242.8 inhabitants per square mile (93.7/km^{2}). There were 19 housing units at an average density of 98.1 per square mile (37.9/km^{2}). The racial makeup of the CDP was 97.87% White and 2.13% Native American.

There were 18 households, out of which 44.4% had children under the age of 18 living with them, 66.7% were married couples living together, 5.6% had a female householder with no husband present, and 22.2% were non-families. 16.7% of all households were made up of individuals, and 5.6% had someone living alone who was 65 years of age or older. The average household size was 2.61 and the average family size was 2.86.

In the CDP, the population was spread out, with 27.7% under the age of 18, 4.3% from 18 to 24, 31.9% from 25 to 44, 29.8% from 45 to 64, and 6.4% who were 65 years of age or older. The median age was 36 years. For every 100 females, there were 123.8 males. For every 100 females age 18 and over, there were 142.9 males.

The median income for a household in the CDP was $28,750, and the median income for a family was $28,750. Males had a median income of $28,750 versus $0 for females. The per capita income for the CDP was $13,123. None of the population or families were below the poverty line.
