= Mountain Pass, California =

Unincorporated community in California, United States

Mountain Pass
- Unincorporated community
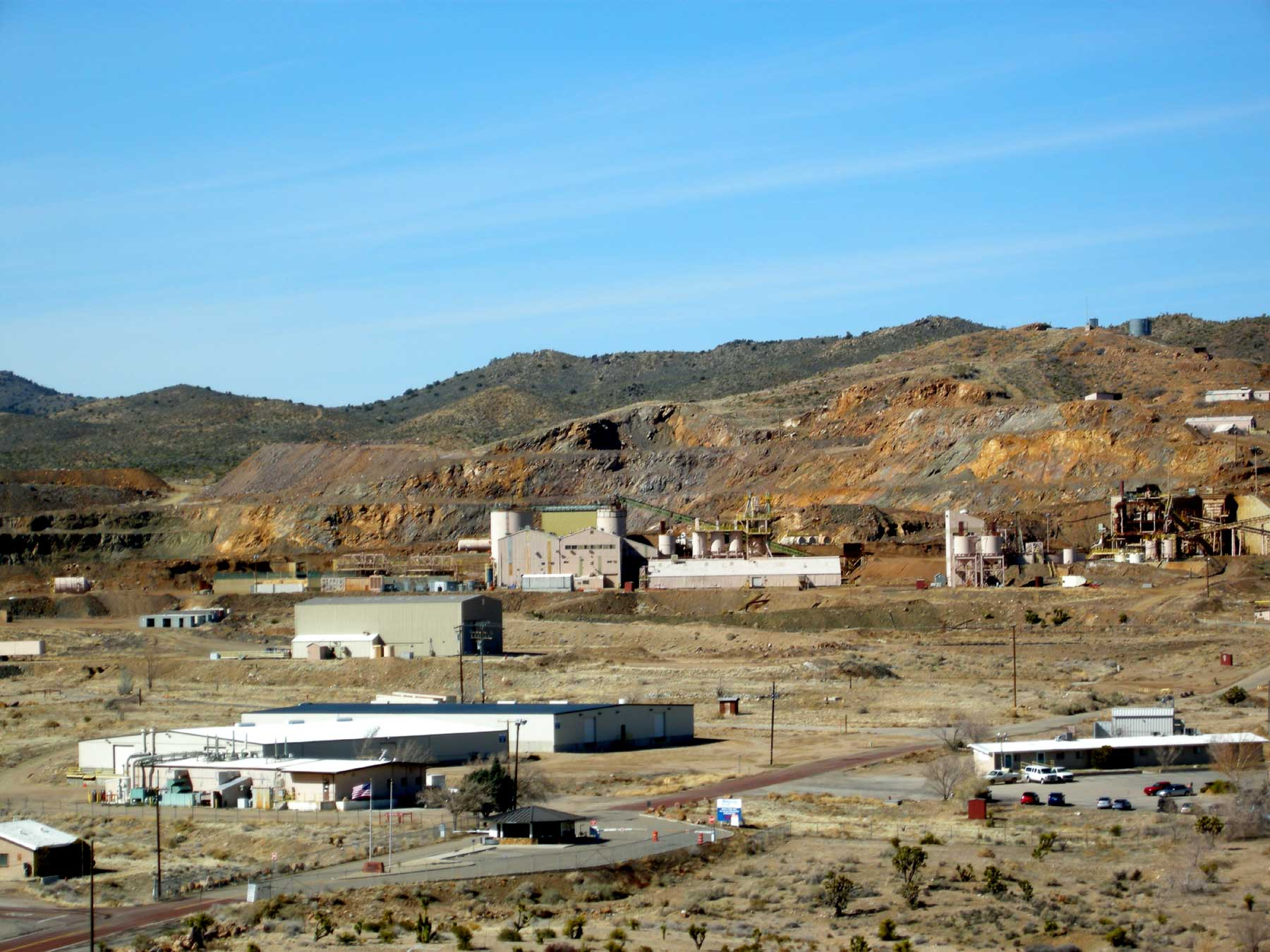
- View of the settlement of Mountain Pass

- Location within the state of California
- Coordinates: 35°28′13″N 115°32′42″W
- Country: United States
- State: California
- County: San Bernardino
- Elevation: 4,728 ft (1,441 m)
- Time zone: UTC-8 (Pacific (PST))
  - Summer (DST): UTC-7 (PDT)
- ZIP Codes: 92366
- Area code: 760

Mountain Pass is an unincorporated community in San Bernardino County, California, United States. It is situated on Interstate 15 in the southeast mountainous desert region of the state approximately 15 miles (24 km) from the Nevada border at an elevation of 4,730 feet (1,440 m)—the highest point along I-15 between California and Nevada. It has a population of 30.

The most prominent feature of the town, and its reason for existence, is the Mountain Pass Mine, an open-pit mine for rare-earth elements. The mine and its associated processing facilities are owned by MP Materials, which purchased the assets out of bankruptcy on July 10, 2017. It produces approximately 15% of the world's supply of rare-earth elements.

== Climate ==
Typical of the High Desert, Mountain Pass has a cold semi-arid climate (Köppen climate classification BSk), Winters are chilly but also sunny, with daytime highs around 50 and nighttime lows just below freezing. Summers are hot and somewhat wetter, with July, the hottest month, having a normal high in the low 90s. Although dry weather usually prevails in most months, the wettest months are July and August when thunderstorms commonly form over the nearby mountain ranges, which can cause flash flooding. Snow is uncommon but not rare, usually falling 2–3 times a year. Most of the snow does not stick to the ground very long, usually melting by mid afternoon.

Climate data for Mountain Pass, California. (Elevation 4,740 ft)
Month	Jan	Feb	Mar	Apr	May	Jun	Jul	Aug	Sep	Oct	Nov	Dec	Year
Record high °F (°C)	71 (22)	76 (24)	81 (27)	90 (32)	104 (40)	109 (43)	110 (43)	109 (43)	102 (39)	96 (36)	89 (32)	70 (21)	110 (43)
Mean daily maximum °F (°C)	50.4 (10.2)	53.7 (12.1)	59.0 (15.0)	66.4 (19.1)	76.3 (24.6)	87.0 (30.6)	92.8 (33.8)	89.9 (32.2)	83.9 (28.8)	72.4 (22.4)	58.9 (14.9)	51.1 (10.6)	70.2 (21.2)
Mean daily minimum °F (°C)	29.5 (−1.4)	32.4 (0.2)	35.8 (2.1)	41.0 (5.0)	49.8 (9.9)	59.2 (15.1)	66.5 (19.2)	64.5 (18.1)	56.6 (13.7)	46.3 (7.9)	36.2 (2.3)	30.2 (−1.0)	45.7 (7.6)
Record low °F (°C)	3 (−16)	6 (−14)	12 (−11)	19 (−7)	28 (−2)	36 (2)	42 (6)	44 (7)	33 (1)	21 (−6)	10 (−12)	−2 (−19)	−2 (−19)
Average precipitation inches (mm)	0.92 (23)	0.89 (23)	0.89 (23)	0.48 (12)	0.27 (6.9)	0.20 (5.1)	1.04 (26)	1.23 (31)	0.59 (15)	0.54 (14)	0.68 (17)	0.63 (16)	8.36 (212)
Average snowfall inches (cm)	2.7 (6.9)	1.8 (4.6)	1.4 (3.6)	0.5 (1.3)	0.2 (0.51)	0 (0)	0 (0)	0 (0)	0 (0)	0.1 (0.25)	1.1 (2.8)	1.5 (3.8)	9.3 (24)
Source: The Western Regional Climate Center
