= Radio Kansas =

Public radio network in central Kansas, United States

- Kansas; United States
- Frequency: 90.1, 89.5, 90.9 MHz

Programming
- Subchannels: FM/HD1: Public radio, Classical music; HD2: Folk/bluegrass "New Grass Valley"; HD3: Instrumental music "The Breeze"; HD4: Jazz "Radio Kansas Jazz"
- Affiliations: American Public Media, Public Radio Exchange

Ownership
- Owner: Hutchinson Community College

History
- First air date: September 11, 1972

Links
- Webcast: Listen Live (FM/HD1); Listen Live (HD2); Listen Live (HD3); Listen Live (HD4)
- Website: https://radiokansas.com

Radio Kansas is a network of public radio stations serving central Kansas. Owned by and headquartered inside Suite 300 on the ground floor of Davis Hall on the campus of Hutchinson Community College on Walnut Street in Hutchinson, it provides service from three transmitters: KHCC-FM (90.1 MHz) for Wichita and Hutchinson; KHCD (89.5 FM) in Salina, also serving Manhattan; and KHCT (90.9 FM) in Great Bend, also serving Hays. The three stations air a mix of classical music and American Public Media programming, including BBC news.

== History ==
The flagship station, KHCC, first signed on air September 11, 1972, as an 80-watt student station operated by what was then Hutchinson Junior Community College; the call letters were derived from the name of the college. Studios were in the basement of Kennedy Library. In 1978, HJCC hired its first professional station manager, David Horning, as part of an effort to upgrade the station to an NPR member. On July 1, 1979, KHCC increased power to a full 100,000 watts from the former KTVH tower at Hutchinson, adding Wichita to its coverage area, and joined NPR. becoming Kansas' third full NPR member. This also made Wichita one of the smallest markets with two competing NPR member stations. KHCC brought NPR programming to several Wichita suburbs who, at the time, got only a marginal signal from the market's other NPR member, KMUW; that station would not upgrade to full power until 1987. In 2022, changes in NPR's pricing scheme led Radio Kansas to leave NPR, substituting BBC and APM news shows in the same dayparts. As of 2025, this schedule remains.

KHCD was added on January 28, 1988, followed by KHCT on August 3, 1992—delayed by the collapse of its first tower during construction. In advance of KHCT signing on, KHCC rebranded itself as "Radio Kansas". Radio Kansas now serves a broadcast area with over one million, with a combined footprint covering most of the densely populated area of central Kansas.

Radio Kansas began broadcasting in the HD Radio format in 2006 and was one of the first NPR members to do so. In 2012, it signed on three additional HD streams on all three stations. HD2 ("New Grass Valley") is a full-time folk and bluegrass station, HD3 airs contemporary instrumental music ("The Breeze") and HD4 airs jazz ("Radio Kansas Jazz").

== Transmitters ==
Radio Kansas transmitters
Call sign	Frequency	City of license	Facility ID	ERP (W)	HAAT	Class	Transmitter coordinates	Founded
KHCC-FM	90.1 FM	Hutchinson	28158	100,000	395 m (1,296 ft)	C0	38°3′22.00″N 97°44′43.00″W	September 11, 1972
KHCD	89.5 FM	Salina	28156	100,000	275 m (902 ft)	C1	39°6′16.00″N 97°23′15.00″W	January 28, 1988
KHCT	90.9 FM	Great Bend	28157	50,000	238 m (781 ft)	C1	38°37′4.00″N 98°56′32.00″W	August 3, 1992
