= KIXQ =

Radio station in Joplin, Missouri

Coordinates: 37.097°N 94.574°W

- Joplin, Missouri; United States
- Broadcast area: Joplin, MO; Pittsburg, KS; and Miami, OK
- Frequency: 102.5 MHz (HD Radio)
- Branding: Kix 102.5

Programming
- Format: Country

Ownership
- Owner: Zimmer Radio

History
- First air date: November 21, 1974
- Former call signs: KPCG (1974–1981); KKUZ (1981-1993); WMBH-FM (1993–1994); KJKT (1994–1996)

Technical information
- Licensing authority: FCC
- Facility ID: 5269
- Class: C1
- ERP: 100,000 watts
- HAAT: 278 meters (912 feet)

Links
- Public license information: Public file; LMS
- Webcast: Listen Live
- Website: kix1025.com

KIXQ (102.5 FM, "KIX 102.5") is a country music formatted radio station licensed in Joplin, Missouri, and is owned by the Zimmer Radio It is the third radio station in the four-state area to multicast in HD Radio.

KIXQ is simulcast on HD-1. KZRG is simulcasted on HD-2.

== History ==
The Pentecostal Church of God in America obtained a construction permit to build a new FM radio station in Joplin on June 13, 1974, beating out an application from Joplin AM station KFSB. Program testing began on November 21, 1974, for KPCG, which aired religious and classical music from studios in the church's building at 6th and Main streets.

In 1981, KPCG was sold to Command Communications, presided by Pat Demaree. the spring of 1981 under the ownership of Pat Demaree, 102.5 was a Top 40 (CHR) format under the moniker Z-103 and was rebranded "The Z 102.5" around 1990 under the helm of Al Zar and Gary Bandy that lasted a year. Following that time, the station went through a number of format changes including adult contemporary and satellite-fed country. Chuck Dunaway of Big Mac Broadcasting purchased the station, changed its call letters to KJKT, and rebranded it as Country Kat 102.5. Mr. Dunaway then purchased KSYN (92.5 FM) and rebranded the station, "Kissin' 92.5."

During this time, KIXQ was on air at 93.9 FM (known as KIX 94) playing more traditional country in the era when Garth Brooks had exploded on the scene. The owners of KIX 94 purchased the 97.9 FM frequency which, at the time, was a Christian station and Ralph Cherry changed 97.9's format to Big Dog New Country to compete against Country Kat.

Mr. Dunaway then bought 93.9 and 97.9. This left them with two competing country music format stations. The decision was made to combine the two stations into one with the KIXQ call letters and "KIX" slogan at the 102.5 FM frequency. For a brief period, the same programming was simulcast on both stations and they were referred to as "KAT, and KIX 102.5." Once the transition was complete, 102.5 FM officially became KIX 102.5, 93.9 FM flipped to an Adult Contemporary station known as Magic 93.9 with the call letters KJMK and 97.9 flipped to Classic Rock Big Dog 97.9.

Mr. Dunaway sold the stations to the Zimmer Radio Group. The Joplin stations were sold in July 2007 to James Zimmer, and he created a new company called Zimmer Radio, Inc.

== See also ==
- List of radio stations in Missouri
