= KGEN-FM =

Radio station in Hanford, California

- Hanford, California; United States
- Broadcast area: Visalia-Tulare
- Frequency: 94.5 MHz
- Branding: La Ley 94.5

Programming
- Format: Regional Mexican

Ownership
- Owner: Jose Arredondo; (JA Ventures, Inc.)

History
- First air date: 1999

Technical information
- Licensing authority: FCC
- Facility ID: 25970
- Class: A
- ERP: 3,300 watts
- HAAT: 136 meters (446 ft)
- Transmitter coordinates: 36°12′15.8″N 119°33′56.4″W

Links
- Public license information: Public file; LMS

KGEN-FM (94.5 FM) is a radio station broadcasting a Regional Mexican format. It is licensed to Hanford, California, United States, and serves the Visalia-Tulare area. The station is owned by Jose Arredondo, through licensee JA Ventures, Inc.
