= KWTH =

Coordinates: 34.644°N 116.628°W

Satellite of KWVE-FM, San Clemente
- Barstow, California; United States
- Frequency: 91.3 MHz
- Branding: K-Wave

Programming
- Format: Christian radio

Ownership
- Owner: New Life Christian School; (Advance Ministries, Inc.)

History
- First air date: 2006
- Call sign meaning: Winning The Highway

Technical information
- Licensing authority: FCC
- Facility ID: 87122
- Class: B
- ERP: 1,550 watts
- HAAT: 699.9 meters (2,296 ft)
- Translator: 96.5 K243BQ (Big Bear City)

Links
- Public license information: Public file; LMS
- Website: www.kwve.com

KWTH (91.3 FM) is a non-commercial radio station licensed to Barstow, California, United States, broadcasting a Christian format. Owned by the New Life Christian School, with the license held by Advance Ministries, Inc, KWTH mostly simulcasts the programming of KWVE-FM in San Clemente, with studios on West MacArthur Boulevard in Santa Ana.

KWTH's transmitter is sited in the Rodman Mountains, 35 miles southeast of Bartow. It serves the Victor Valley area and eastward into the High Desert along I-15 from the Cajon Pass to Baker and I-40 to Essex.

== History ==
KWTH signed on the air in 2006. It was a part of a quadrocast with KWTW in Bishop, California, KWTM in June Lake, California, and KWTD in Ridgecrest, California, as well as five translators, known as the Living Proof Radio Network, as a ministry of Calvary Chapel in Bishop.

On August 26, 2007, translator K284AU at 104.7 FM licensed to Clark Mountain was added to extend the coverage along the I-15 into Primm, Nevada.

On October 5, 2010, KWTH changed ownership to Penfold Communications. It was announced in Living Proof's quarterly newsletter that KWTH would be changing hands in late October or early November and that Living Proof would truly miss being able to serve the Barstow and Victor Valley communities, and encouraged people to listen on KWTD 91.9 FM as they traveled across to the western portion of the High Desert. KWTH continued to simulcast the feed of the Living Proof Radio Network until October 27, 2010, when KWTH began simulcasting KRTM in Yucca Valley, California. Later, KRTM also began simulcasting on KKRS in Davenport, Washington, KTWD in Wallace, Idaho, and WKJA in Brunswick, Ohio as well as several translators.

On November 8, 2010, translator K295AJ at 98.1 FM in North Las Vegas, Nevada was added to extend coverage into the Las Vegas Valley.

On August 11, 2011, KWTH changed ownership to Calvary Chapel Costa Mesa, and continued to simulcast the feed of the KRTM Radio Network until August 16, 2011, when it began simulcasting the HD2 channel of K-Wave 107.9 in San Clemente, California, which airs a commercial-free and jockless parallel of all exactly the same programs as the analog signal. As of December 2012, KWVE-HD2 station has ceased broadcasting and KWVE-FM only operates on HD1.

Effective June 18, 2021, Calvary Chapel of Costa Mesa sold KWTH to New Life Christian School's Advance Ministries, Inc. for $30,000.
