= Lancaster, California =

City in California, United States

- City
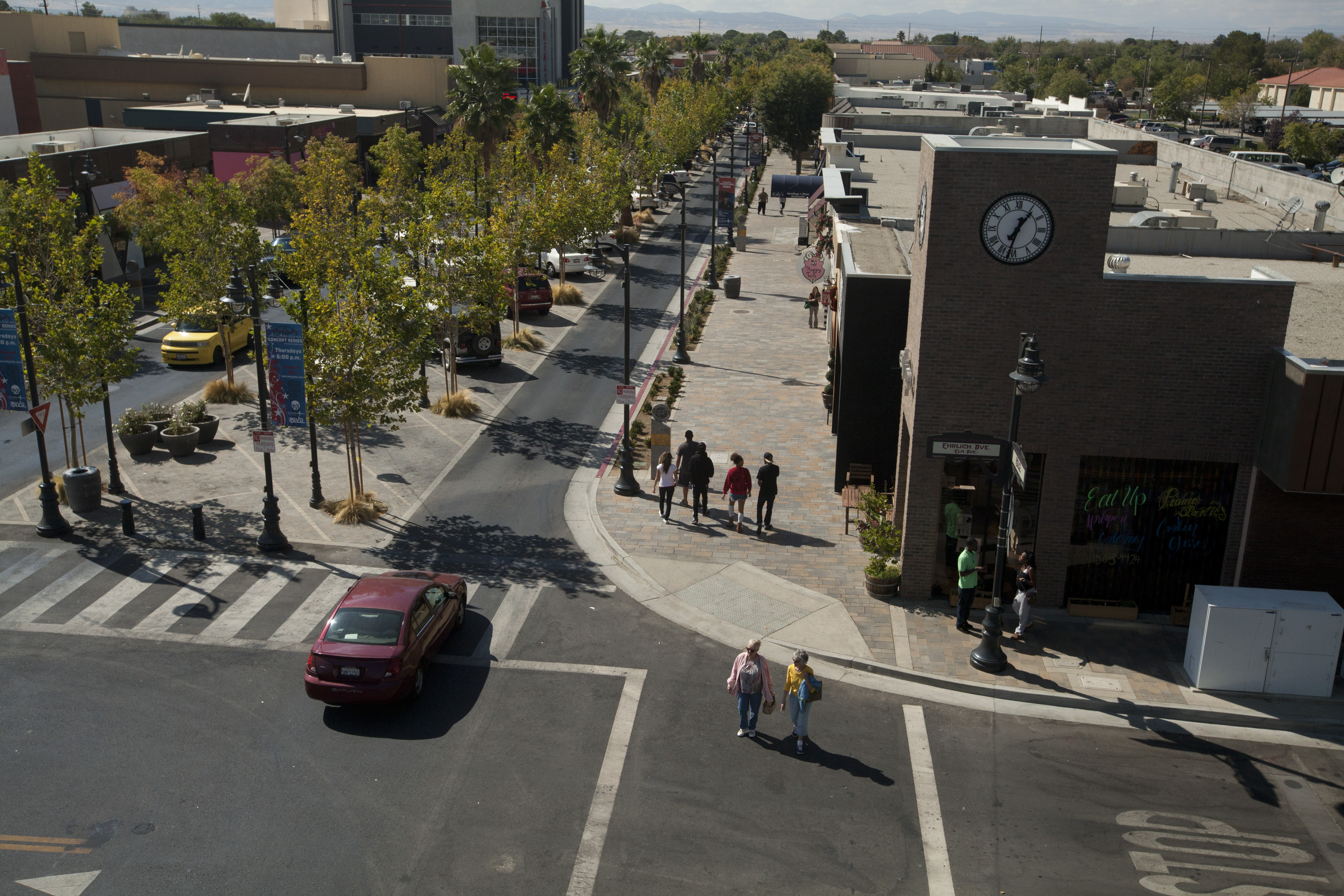
- Downtown Lancaster

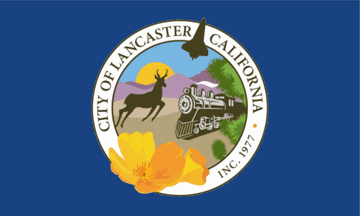
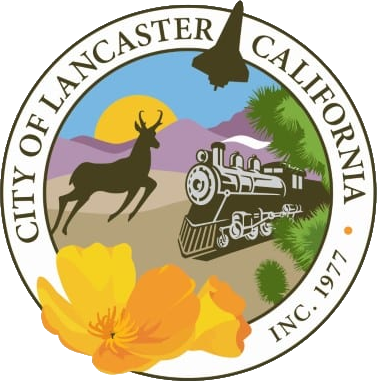
- Flag Seal
- Motto: Creating a better tomorrow. Together.
- Interactive map of Lancaster, California
- Coordinates: 34°41′N 118°9′W
- Country: United States
- State: California
- County: Los Angeles
- Incorporated: November 22, 1977

Government
  - Type: Council-manager
  - Mayor: R. Rex Parris
  - City Manager: Trolis Niebla

Area
  - Total: 94.52 sq mi (244.81 km^{2})
  - Land: 94.27 sq mi (244.16 km^{2})
  - Water: 0.25 sq mi (0.65 km^{2}) 0.27%
- Elevation: 2,359 ft (719 m)

Population (2020)
  - Total: 173,516
  - Density: 1,671.6/sq mi (645.41/km^{2})
- Time zone: UTC−8 (Pacific)
  - Summer (DST): UTC−7 (PDT)
- ZIP Codes: 93534–93536, 93539, 93584
- Area code: 661
- FIPS code: 06-40130
- GNIS feature IDs: 1652741, 2411620
- Website: www.cityoflancasterca.org

Lancaster /ˈlæŋ.kæstər/ is a charter city in northern Los Angeles County, in the Antelope Valley of the western Mojave Desert in Southern California, United States. As of the 2020 census, the population was 173,516, making Lancaster the 158th-most populous city in the United States and the 31st most populous in California. Lancaster is a twin city with its southern neighbor Palmdale; together, they are the principal cities within the Antelope Valley region.

Lancaster is located approximately 70 miles (110 km) north (via I-5 and SR 14) of downtown Los Angeles, nine miles south of the Kern County line. It is separated from the Los Angeles Basin by the San Gabriel Mountains to the south and from Bakersfield and the San Joaquin Valley by the Tehachapi Mountains to its northwest. The population of Lancaster has grown from 37,000 at the time of its incorporation in 1977 to over 173,000 as of 2020.

== History ==
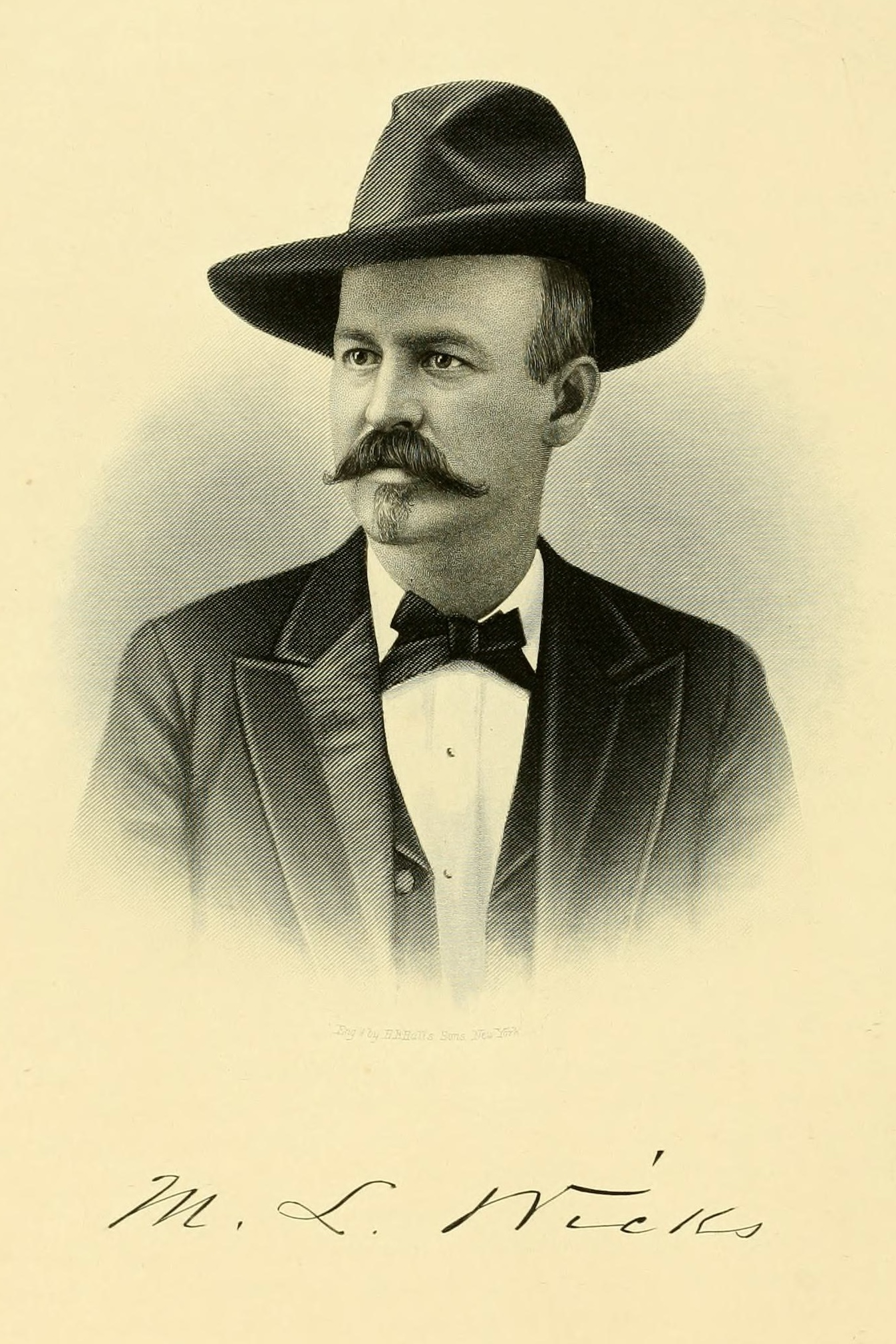
Moses Langley Wicks, pioneer developer of Lancaster

Antelope Valley, the area where Lancaster is now located, was home to the Paiute tribe at the time of first contact with Europeans. The Antelope Valley's central geography then served as the hub of a trade route for tribes trading between the California coast, the Central Valley, the Great Basin, and the pueblos of Arizona.

After statehood, the Antelope Valley again served as a geographic shortcut but for the Stockton-Los Angeles Road and the Butterfield Overland Mail, which had two nearby stops in Mud Spring and Neenach in the 1850s. However, Lancaster's origins as a settlement start with the Southern Pacific Railroad, which replaced the stage coach routes. The railroad built a station house, locomotive watering facility, section gang housing, and railroad track in the location of the town's current center. In 1876 the Southern Pacific completed the line through the Antelope Valley, linking San Francisco and Los Angeles.

Lancaster began as a Scottish settlement. The origin of Lancaster's name is unclear, attributed variously to the surname of a railroad station clerk, the moniker given by railroad officials, or the former Pennsylvania home (Lancaster, Pennsylvania) of unknown settlers. Train service brought passengers through the water-stop-turned-community, which, with the help of promotional literature, attracted new settlers. The person credited with formally developing the town is Moses Langley Wicks, who in 1884 bought property from the railroad for $2.50 per acre, mapped out a town with streets and lots, and by September was advertising 160-acre tracts of land for $6 an acre. The following year, the Lancaster News started publication, making it the first weekly newspaper in the Antelope Valley. By 1890, Lancaster was bustling and booming, and thanks to adequate rainfall, farmers planted and sold thousands of acres of wheat and barley.

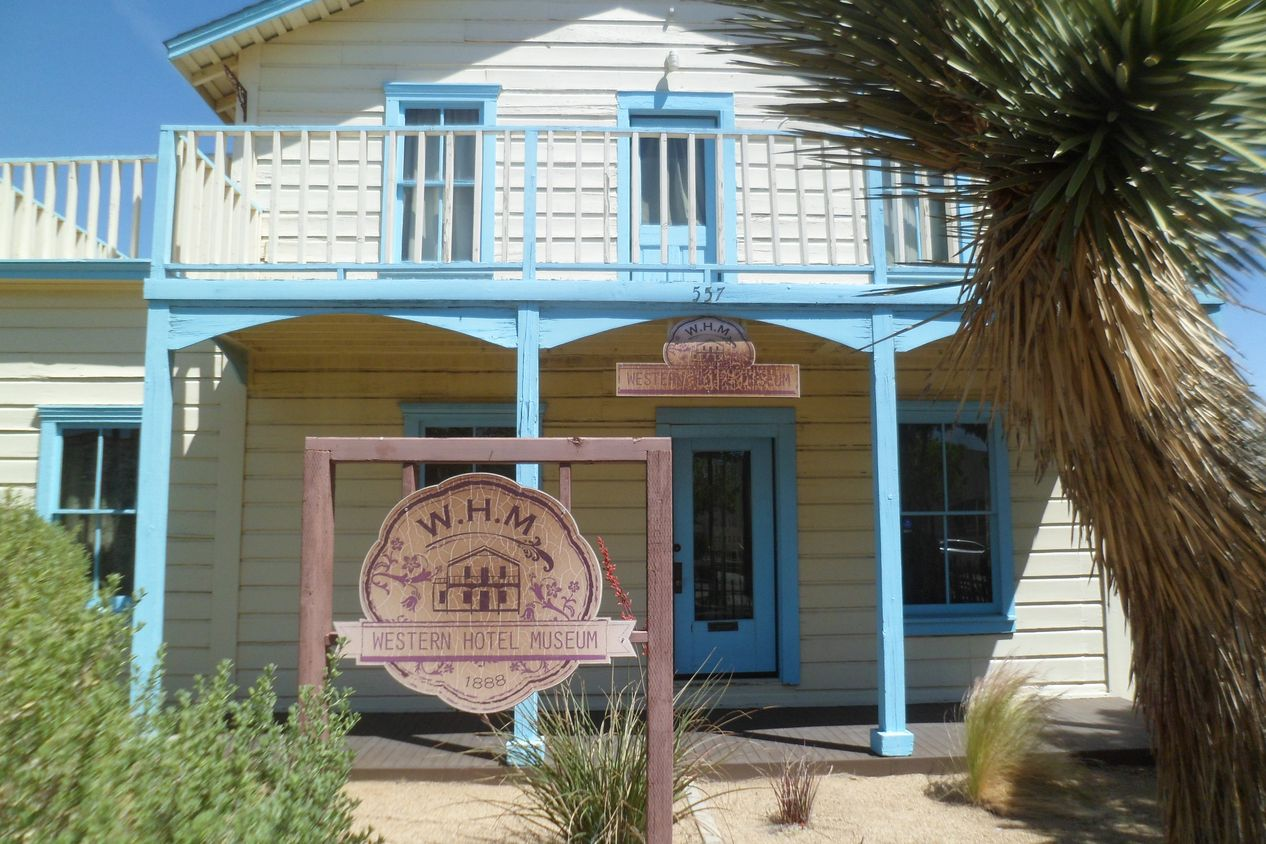
Western Hotel Museum, Lancaster: The oldest standing structure in Lancaster

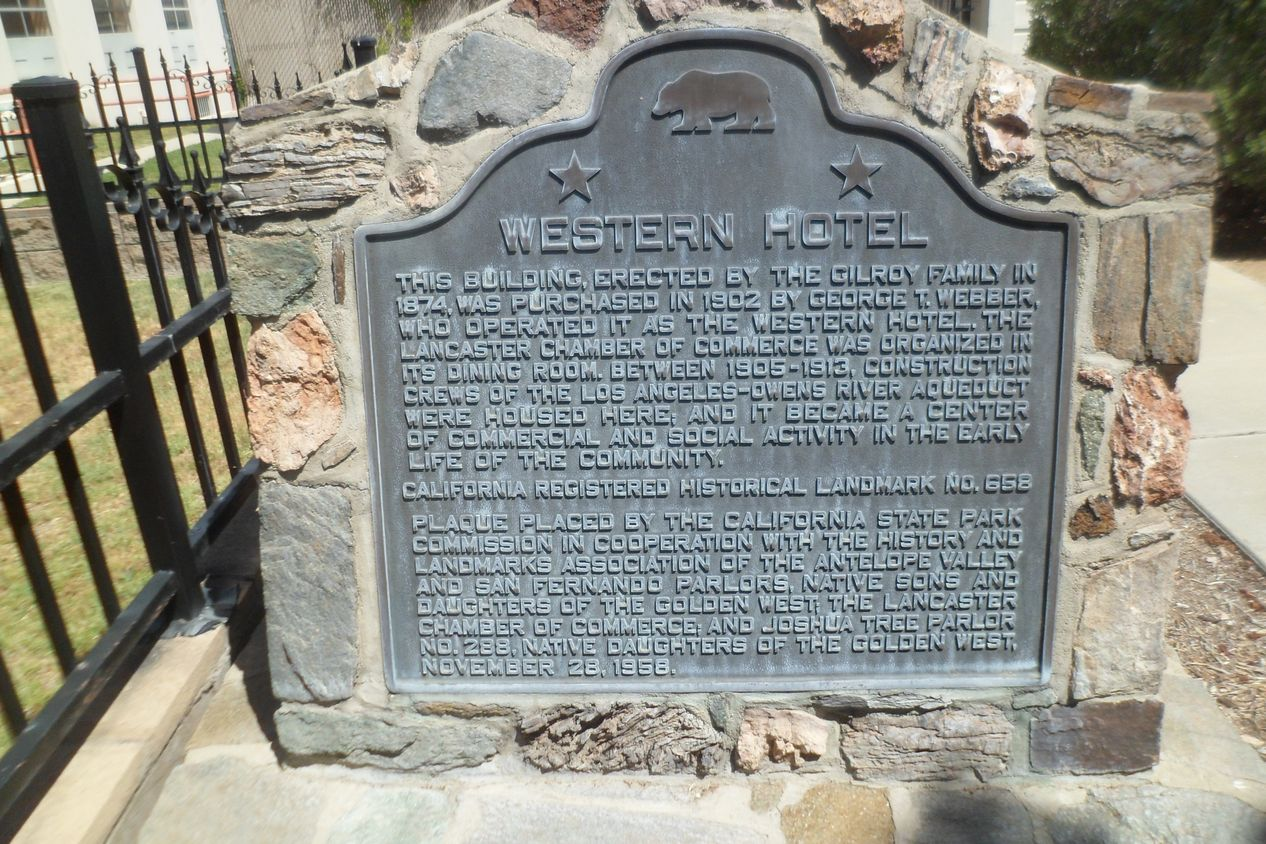
Historical plaque in front of the Western Hotel Museum

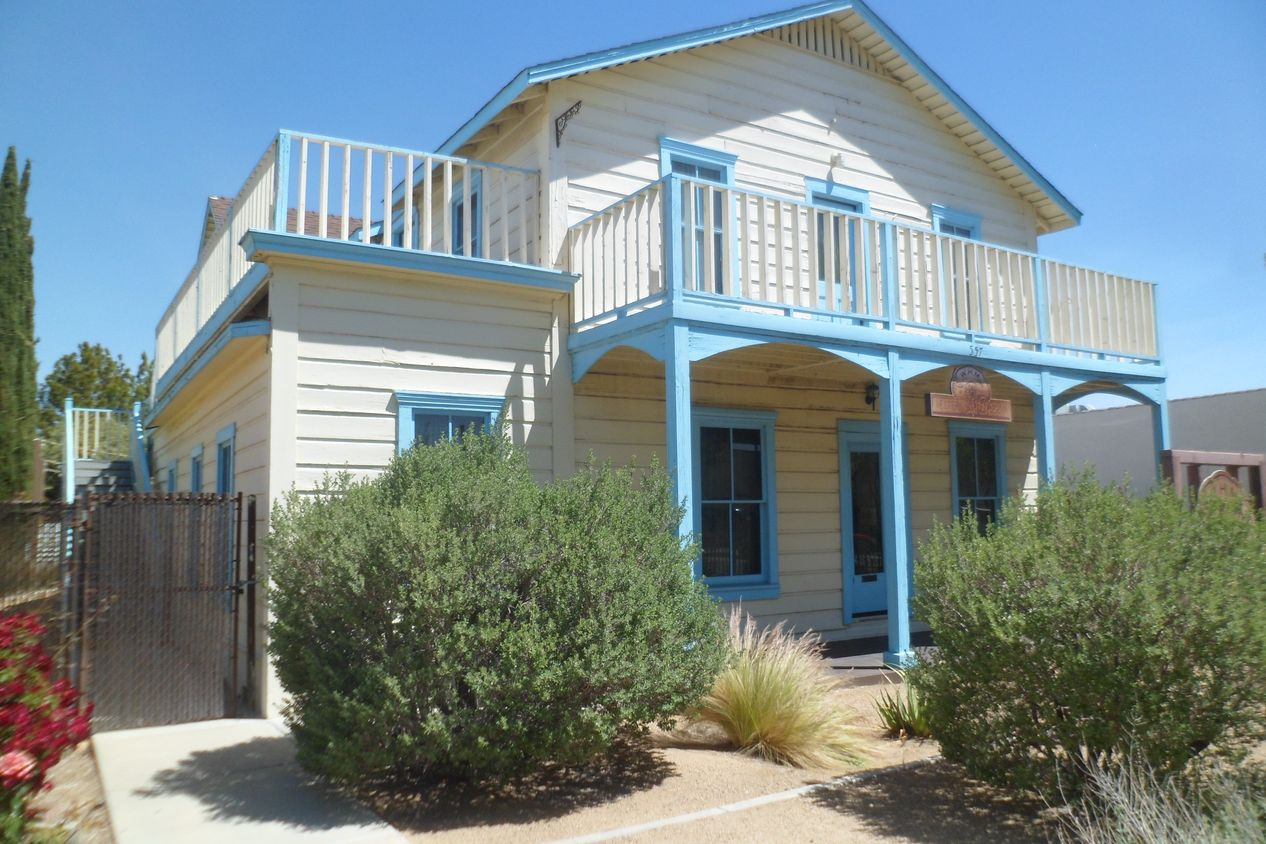
Western Hotel Museum, Lancaster, viewed at an angle to show side of building

The town was devastated by the decade-long drought that began in 1894, killing businesses and driving cattle north, though fortunes improved somewhat in the late-1890s following the nearby discoveries of gold and borax. The Tropico Gold Mine in Rosamond was briefly the largest goldmine in Southern California before its 1956 closure. The Pacific Coast Borax Company mine would later become the world's largest borax mine, producing nearly half of the world's supply of borates. The 1912 completion of Antelope Valley High School allowed students from the growing region to study locally instead of moving to distant cities, hosting the state's first high school dormitory system.

Lancaster State Prison opened in 1993 and before that Los Angeles County hosted no prisons but accounted for forty percent of California's state-prison inmates. "Most of Lancaster's civic leaders and residents" opposed the building of the prison, and four inmates escaped from LAC in its first year of operation. Nevertheless, by 2000 a proposal to increase the proportion of maximum-security inmates received little criticism.

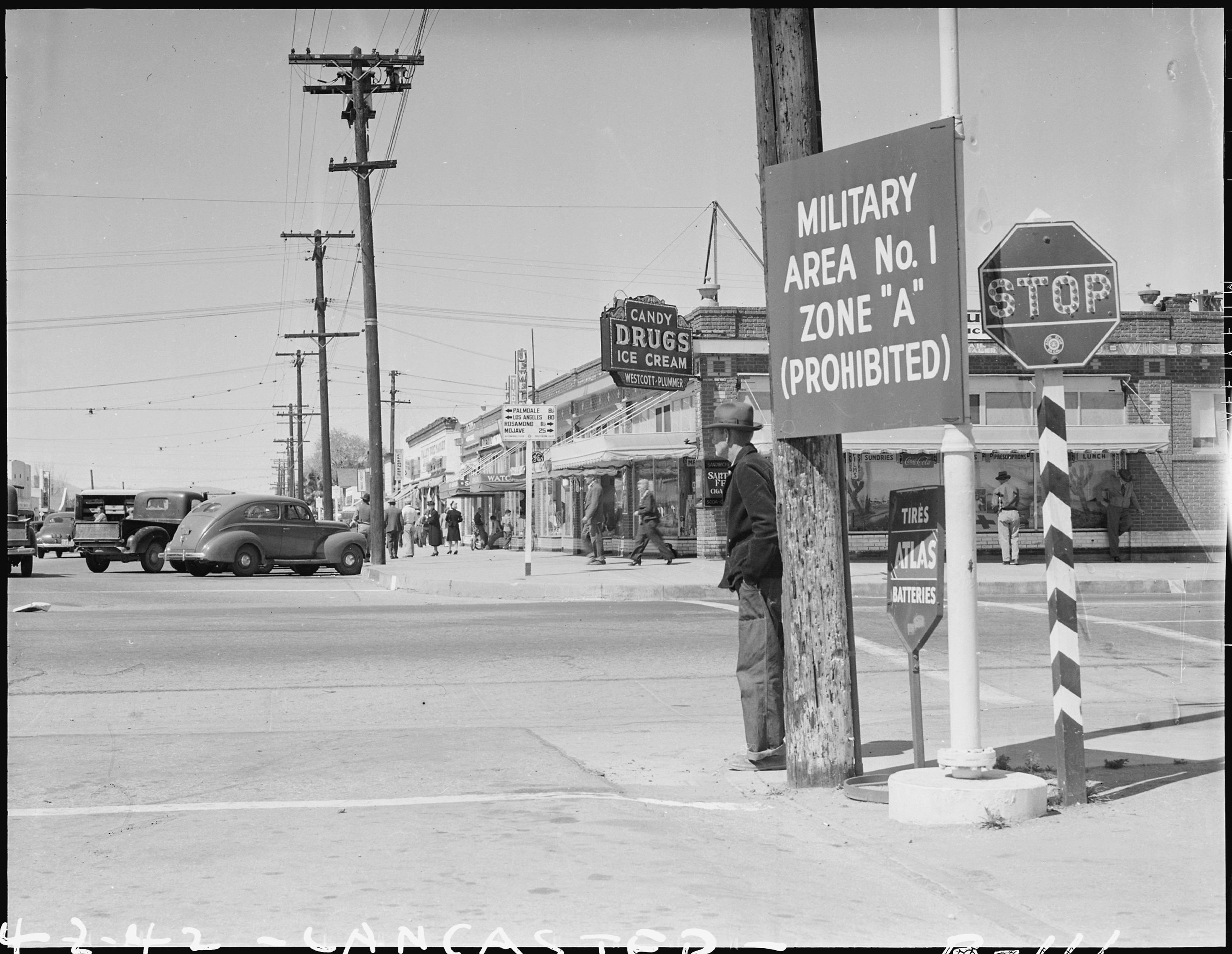
A sign designating the military zone of Lancaster, 1942

In 2005, Hyundai Motor Co. announced the grand opening of a 4,300-acre, $60 million "Proving Ground", a state-of-the-art testing facility for cars and sports utility vehicles in nearby California City.

In 2010, the city opened The BLVD, a one-mile revitalized stretch of Lancaster Boulevard between 10th Street West and Sierra Highway, with additional construction on Elm Avenue and Fig Avenue continuing for the next few months.

City leaders set the goal of becoming the nation's first Net-Zero municipality, wherein the city would produce more clean energy than it consumes. Much of the city's infrastructure including City Hall, local schools, and the minor league baseball stadium are solar-powered. In March 2013, Lancaster became the first city in the USA to require solar panels on all new homes in an effort to make the community more carbon neutral. The rule took effect in January 2014.

=== War Eagle Field / Mira Loma ===
War Eagle Field is a former airfield located in the Mojave Desert, about 5 mi (8.0 km) west of central Lancaster.

In 1944, the flight school changed its name to Mira Loma Flight Academy. The airfield inactivated on October 1, 1945, and was declared surplus in 1946. Responsibility for it was given to the War Assets Administration. The land was then bought by Los Angeles County. The airfield was converted to the Mira Loma Detention Center. In 2012, Los Angeles County closed the detention center. Los Angeles County is currently collaborating with the City of Lancaster, the faith-based community, and the non-profit community to convert the facility into a winter shelter.

== Geography ==
=== Climate ===
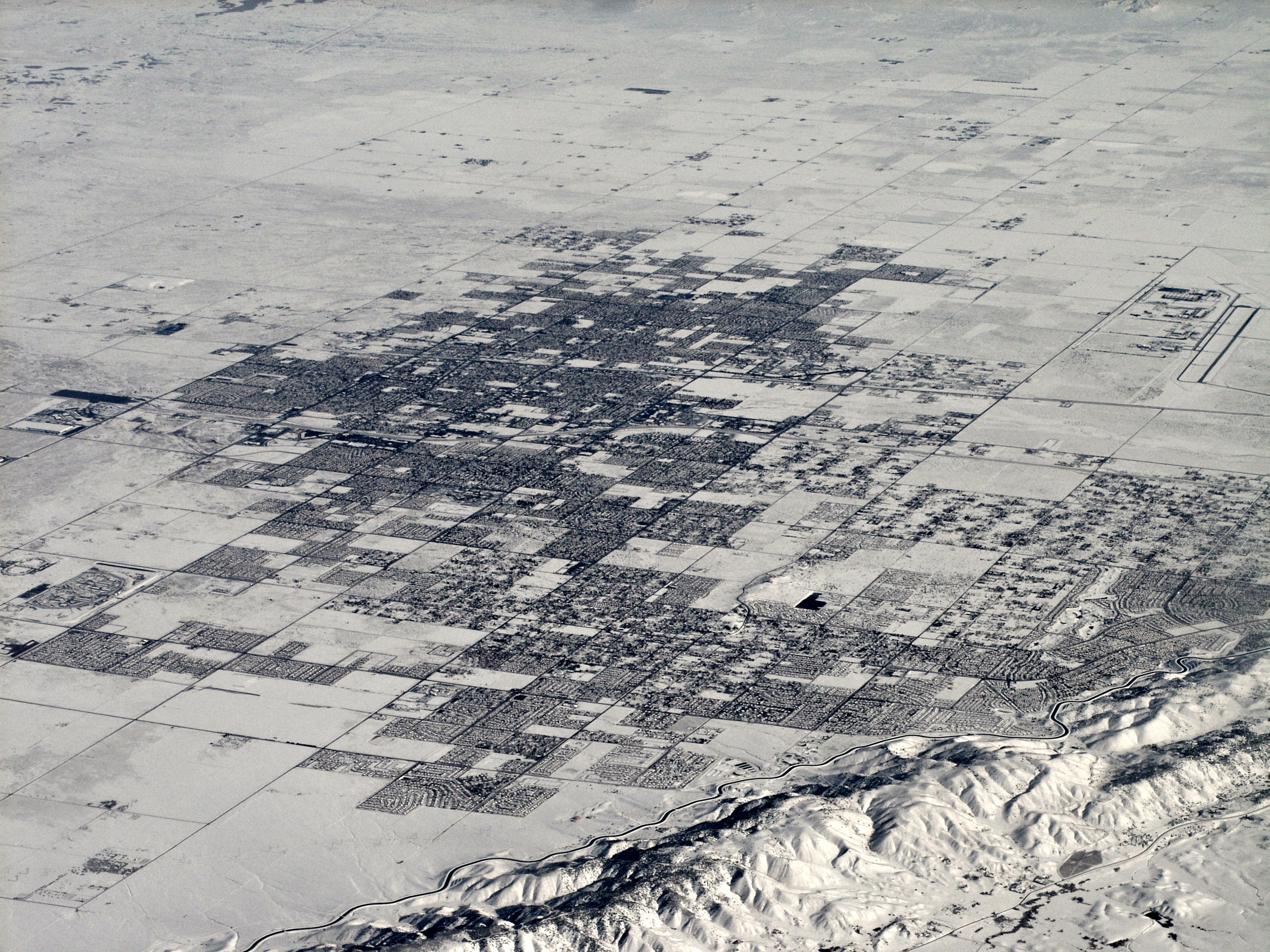
Lancaster covered in several inches of snow after a winter snowstorm in December 2008

Lancaster has a semi-arid climate, bordering on an arid climate. The area within Lancaster is covered by shrublands (80%), forests (8%), grasslands (7%), lakes and rivers (2%), and croplands (2%). Lancaster and its immediate surroundings are part of USDA Plant Hardiness Zone 8b. Winters are cool to mild, with daily normal minimum temperatures at or just below freezing from late November until late January; summers are hot and nearly rainless. On average, annually there are 68 mornings with a minimum at or below freezing, and 35.7 °F (2.1 °C) afternoons with a maximum at or above 100 °F (37.8 °C). With a normal annual precipitation of 6.81 inches (173 millimeters), clear days are the norm even in winter, when surrounding mountain ranges are blanketed with snow. Thunderstorms are infrequent but do occur in July through September. Spring wildflowers are abundant, including Lupines, the California Poppy, Fiddlenecks, purple owl's clover, California Goldfields, Creamcups, and Coreopsis. Summer nights are cool and the Pacific tree frog or barn owl can be heard. Average annual snowfall is around 2 inches (5.1 cm).

The record high temperature in Lancaster was 115 °F (46.1 °C) on June 30, 2013. The record low temperature was 2 °F (−16.7 °C) on December 24, 1984. The wettest "rain year" was from July 1992 to June 1993 with 19.57 inches (497.1 mm) and the driest from July 2012 to June 2013 with 1.26 inches (32.0 mm). The most precipitation in one month was 7.46 inches (189.5 mm) in January 1993. The most precipitation in one twenty-four-hour period was 2.93 inches (74.4 mm) on March 1, 1983. In January 1979, 23.9 inches (0.61 m) of snow fell in Lancaster.

Climate data for Lancaster, California (General William J. Fox Airfield), 1991–2020 normals, extremes 1945–present
Month	Jan	Feb	Mar	Apr	May	Jun	Jul	Aug	Sep	Oct	Nov	Dec	Year
Record high °F (°C)	80 (27)	84 (29)	91 (33)	98 (37)	106 (41)	115 (46)	115 (46)	113 (45)	113 (45)	106 (41)	90 (32)	85 (29)	115 (46)
Mean maximum °F (°C)	70.7 (21.5)	74.3 (23.5)	81.4 (27.4)	89.8 (32.1)	96.4 (35.8)	104.0 (40.0)	107.7 (42.1)	106.4 (41.3)	102.3 (39.1)	93.1 (33.9)	81.0 (27.2)	71.0 (21.7)	109.1 (42.8)
Mean daily maximum °F (°C)	58.7 (14.8)	61.5 (16.4)	67.2 (19.6)	72.9 (22.7)	81.6 (27.6)	91.3 (32.9)	97.6 (36.4)	97.8 (36.6)	91.4 (33.0)	80.0 (26.7)	67.0 (19.4)	57.7 (14.3)	77.1 (25.0)
Daily mean °F (°C)	45.0 (7.2)	48.0 (8.9)	53.5 (11.9)	58.9 (14.9)	67.5 (19.7)	76.4 (24.7)	82.4 (28.0)	81.3 (27.4)	74.2 (23.4)	62.9 (17.2)	51.0 (10.6)	43.7 (6.5)	62.1 (16.7)
Mean daily minimum °F (°C)	31.3 (−0.4)	34.5 (1.4)	39.8 (4.3)	44.9 (7.2)	53.4 (11.9)	61.5 (16.4)	67.2 (19.6)	64.7 (18.2)	56.9 (13.8)	45.8 (7.7)	35.0 (1.7)	29.7 (−1.3)	47.1 (8.4)
Mean minimum °F (°C)	19.3 (−7.1)	22.0 (−5.6)	27.0 (−2.8)	32.0 (0.0)	40.9 (4.9)	48.8 (9.3)	56.2 (13.4)	53.8 (12.1)	44.6 (7.0)	32.1 (0.1)	21.3 (−5.9)	16.4 (−8.7)	14.8 (−9.6)
Record low °F (°C)	3 (−16)	11 (−12)	17 (−8)	23 (−5)	32 (0)	38 (3)	45 (7)	43 (6)	27 (−3)	18 (−8)	12 (−11)	2 (−17)	2 (−17)
Average precipitation inches (mm)	1.46 (37)	1.76 (45)	0.96 (24)	0.39 (9.9)	0.10 (2.5)	0.05 (1.3)	0.14 (3.6)	0.01 (0.25)	0.12 (3.0)	0.34 (8.6)	0.37 (9.4)	1.11 (28)	6.81 (172.55)
Average precipitation days (≥ 0.01 in)	5.0	5.3	4.3	2.2	1.0	0.3	0.7	0.3	0.5	1.6	2.2	4.4	27.8
Source 1: NOAA
Source 2: National Weather Service

=== Flora and fauna ===
California poppy is a blossom that originates from the Lancaster area. The wildlife in Lancaster comprises creatures like coyotes, kit foxes, desert tortoises, jackrabbits, cottontail rabbits, ground squirrels, kangaroo rats, various species of snakes and lizards, along with the occasional sightings of badgers or skunks. In Lancaster, Sidewinder and Mojave green rattlesnakes emerge during the warm seasons. The bird population in Lancaster features both migratory birds and those that reside permanently, such as golden eagles, hawks, ravens, and owls. Smaller avian species found in the Butte comprise rock and cactus wrens, thrashers, blackbirds, horned larks, ladder-backed woodpeckers, sparrows, finches, and loggerhead shrikes that inhabit the region.

== Demographics ==
Historical population
Census	Pop.	Note	%±
1960	26,012		—
1970	30,948		19.0%
1980	48,027		55.2%
1990	97,291		102.6%
2000	118,718		22.0%
2010	156,633		31.9%
2020	173,516		10.8%
U.S. Decennial Census

Lancaster city, California – Racial and ethnic composition Note: the US Census treats Hispanic/Latino as an ethnic category. This table excludes Latinos from the racial categories and assigns them to a separate category. Hispanics/Latinos may be of any race.
Race / Ethnicity (NH = Non-Hispanic)	Pop 1980	Pop 1990	Pop 2000	Pop 2010	Pop 2020	% 1980	% 1990	% 2000	% 2010	% 2020
White alone (NH)	41,550	71,215	62,256	53,576	42,321	86.51%	73.20%	52.44%	34.20%	24.39%
Black or African American alone (NH)	1,567	6,990	18,548	30,859	35,497	3.26%	7.18%	15.62%	19.70%	20.46%
Native American or Alaska Native alone (NH)	504	756	706	663	704	1.05%	0.78%	0.59%	0.42%	0.41%
Asian alone (NH)	936	3,359	4,348	6,474	7,699	1.95%	3.45%	3.66%	4.13%	4.44%
Pacific Islander alone (NH)	936	3,359	231	295	250	1.95%	3.45%	0.19%	0.19%	0.14%
Other Race alone (NH)	19	155	426	621	1,299	0.04%	0.16%	0.36%	0.40%	0.75%
Mixed race or Multiracial (NH)	x	x	3,559	4,549	7,408	x	x	3.00%	2.90%	4.27%
Hispanic or Latino (any race)	3,451	14,816	28,644	59,596	78,338	7.19%	15.23%	24.13%	38.05%	45.15%
Total	48,027	97,291	118,718	156,633	173,516	100.00%	100.00%	100.00%	100.00%	100.00%

=== 2020 ===
The 2020 United States census reported that Lancaster had a population of 173,516. The population density was 1,840.6 inhabitants per square mile (710.7/km^{2}). The racial makeup of Lancaster was 32.6% White, 21.3% African American, 1.7% Native American, 4.7% Asian, 0.2% Pacific Islander, 23.8% from other races, and 15.7% from two or more races. Hispanic or Latino residents of any race were 45.1% of the population.

The census reported that 97.1% of the population lived in households, 0.8% lived in non-institutionalized group quarters, and 2.2% were institutionalized.

There were 53,280 households, out of which 41.4% included children under the age of 18, 43.1% were married-couple households, 7.4% were cohabiting couple households, 31.1% had a female householder with no partner present, and 18.4% had a male householder with no partner present. 20.7% of households were one person, and 7.5% were one person aged 65 or older. The average household size was 3.16. There were 39,310 families (73.8% of all households).

The age distribution was 27.1% under the age of 18, 10.3% aged 18 to 24, 27.9% aged 25 to 44, 23.5% aged 45 to 64, and 11.2% who were 65 years of age or older. The median age was 33.2 years. For every 100 females, there were 97.2 males.

There were 55,137 housing units at an average density of 584.9 units per square mile (225.8 units/km^{2}), of which 53,280 (96.6%) were occupied. Of these, 58.8% were owner-occupied, and 41.2% were occupied by renters.

In 2023, the US Census Bureau estimated that the median household income was $76,083, and the per capita income was $29,766. About 12.3% of families and 15.5% of the population were below the poverty line.

=== 2010 ===
The 2010 United States census reported that Lancaster had a population of 156,633. The population density was 1,656.7 inhabitants per square mile (639.7/km^{2}). The racial makeup of Lancaster was 77,734 (49.6%) White (34.2% Non-Hispanic White), 32,083 (20.5%) African American, 1,519 (1.0%) Native American, 6,810 (4.3%) Asian (2.2% Filipino, 0.4% Chinese, 0.4% Indian, 0.3% Vietnamese, 0.3% Korean, 0.2% Japanese), 362 (0.2%) Pacific Islander, 29,728 (19.0%) from other races, and 8,397 (5.4%) from two or more races. There were 59,556 people of Hispanic or Latino ancestry, of any race (38.0%).

The Census reported that 148,374 people (94.7% of the population) lived in households, 1,484 (0.9%) lived in non-institutionalized group quarters, and 6,775 (4.3%) were institution

There were 46,992 households, out of which 22,021 (46.9%) had children under the age of 18 living in them, 22,108 (47.0%) were opposite-sex married couples living together, 9,481 (20.2%) had a female householder with no husband present, 3,389 (7.2%) had a male householder with no wife present. There were 3,374 (7.2%) unmarried opposite-sex partnerships, and 376 (0.8%) same-sex married couples or partnerships. 9,239 households (19.7%) were made up of individuals, and 3,060 (6.5%) had someone living alone who was 65 years of age or older. The average household size was 3.16. There were 34,978 families (74.4% of all households); the average family size was 3.62.

There were 47,160 residents(30.1%) under the age of 18, 18,607 (11.9%) aged 18 to 24, 42,575 (27.2%) aged 25 to 44, 35,632 (22.7%) aged 45 to 64, and 12,659 residents (8.1%) who were 65 years of age or older. The median age was 30.4 years. For every 100 females, there were 100.6 males. For every 100 females age 18 and over, there were 99.5 males.

There were 51,835 housing units at an average density of 548.2 per square mile (211.7/km^{2}), of which 28,366 (60.4%) were owner-occupied, and 18,626 (39.6%) were occupied by renters. The homeowner vacancy rate was 3.8%; the rental vacancy rate was 9.4%. 90,064 people (57.5% of the population) lived in owner-occupied housing units and 58,310 people (37.2%) lived in rental housing units.

According to the 2010 United States Census, Lancaster had a median household income of $50,193, with 21.5% of the population living below the federal poverty line.

As of 2000, Mexican (16.9%) and German (10.3%) are the most common ancestries in the city. Mexico (44.3%) and the Philippines (8.4%) are the most common foreign places of birth in Lancaster.

German, English, Irish, Italian and French are the top ancestries. Spanish and Tagalog are the most common spoken non-English languages.

=== Homelessness ===
In 2022, there were 636 homeless individuals in Lancaster.

== Economy ==
The Greater Antelope Valley Economic Alliance describes five areas as business and industrial parks in the city of Lancaster: Fox Field Industrial Corridor (adjacent to the General William J. Fox Airfield) along Avenue G, North Valley Industrial Center, Lancaster Business Park, Enterprise Business Park, Centerpoint Business Park, and the Southern Amargosa Industrial Area. The former Lancaster Redevelopment Agency is credited with attracting major business operations to the area such as SYGMA, Rite Aide, Micheals, Bank of America, and many more. In 2012 the state of California abolished all local redevelopment agencies. The city's economic development department is now responsible for recruiting large employers and is involved in attracting retail and dining to Lancaster Town Center, Front Row Center, and other retail centers throughout the city.

Another focus of the Agency and the city was the revitalization of Downtown Lancaster. With historic buildings interspersed with modern amenities such as a library and performing arts center, downtown businesses formed the Lancaster Old Town Site (LOTS). LOTS has resulted in the renovation of business facades and attraction of new businesses, including boutiques and restaurants in the Old Town Area.

In 2009, Lancaster had 17% unemployment. Given the strength of China's economy in the face of the global recession, Mayor R. Rex Parris identified recruitment of Chinese manufacturing firms as a high priority in 2009. In early 2010, Mayor Parris led a delegation to explore trade opportunities with China. An essential component of this trade mission was a stop in Shenzhen, China to meet with representatives of the battery, alternative energy, solar panel, and vehicle manufacturing firm BYD. BYD was looking to break into the United States vehicle manufacturing market, and was introduced to the City of Lancaster by Los Angeles County Supervisor Michael Antonovich and his wife, Christine.

Lancaster's partnership with BYD began with the "Home of the Future", in which KB Home utilized BYD's energy efficiency and storage technology to construct some of the first affordable near net-zero homes in the U.S. Through the success of this project, a working relationship was born, which BYD and Lancaster continued to cultivate as BYD Auto prepared to enter the U.S. market. Once the firm was ready to establish its manufacturing facility, Lancaster was its first stop. In May 2013, BYD Auto announced two manufacturing facilities to be located in Lancaster. These include a 120,000-square-foot BYD electric bus manufacturing facility, as well as a separate 44,000-square-foot energy storage system (large scale battery) manufacturing facility. By April 2019, BYD Lancaster had produced over 300 electric buses for US and Canada. Lancaster has the highest solar production per capita in California.

As of 2017 unemployment is around 6%.

=== Shopping centers ===
- Valley Central Way
- Lancaster Boulevard (The BLVD)
- Lancaster Commerce Center Shopping Center
- West Lancaster Plaza Shopping Center

== Arts and culture ==
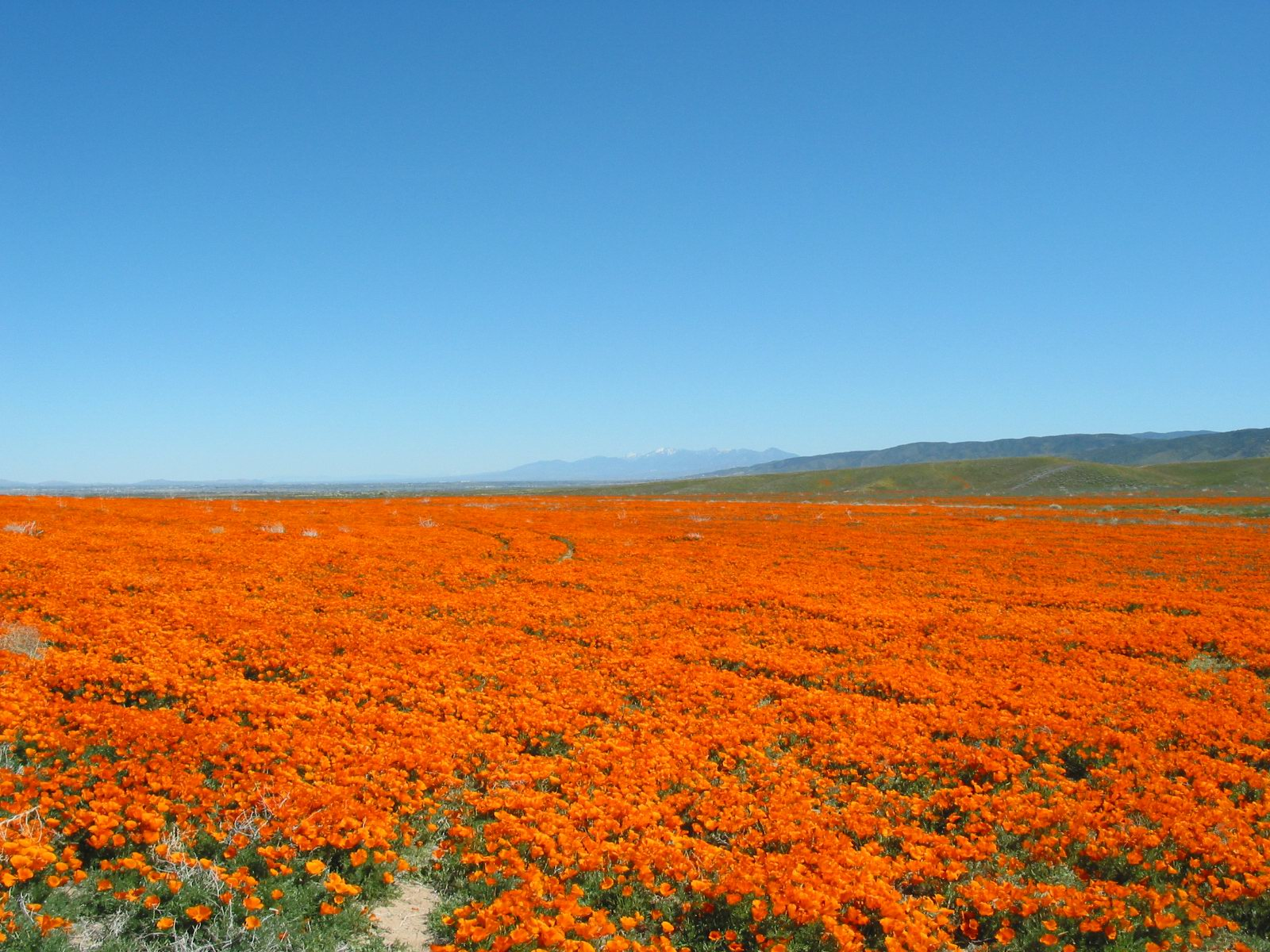
Antelope Valley California Poppy Reserve

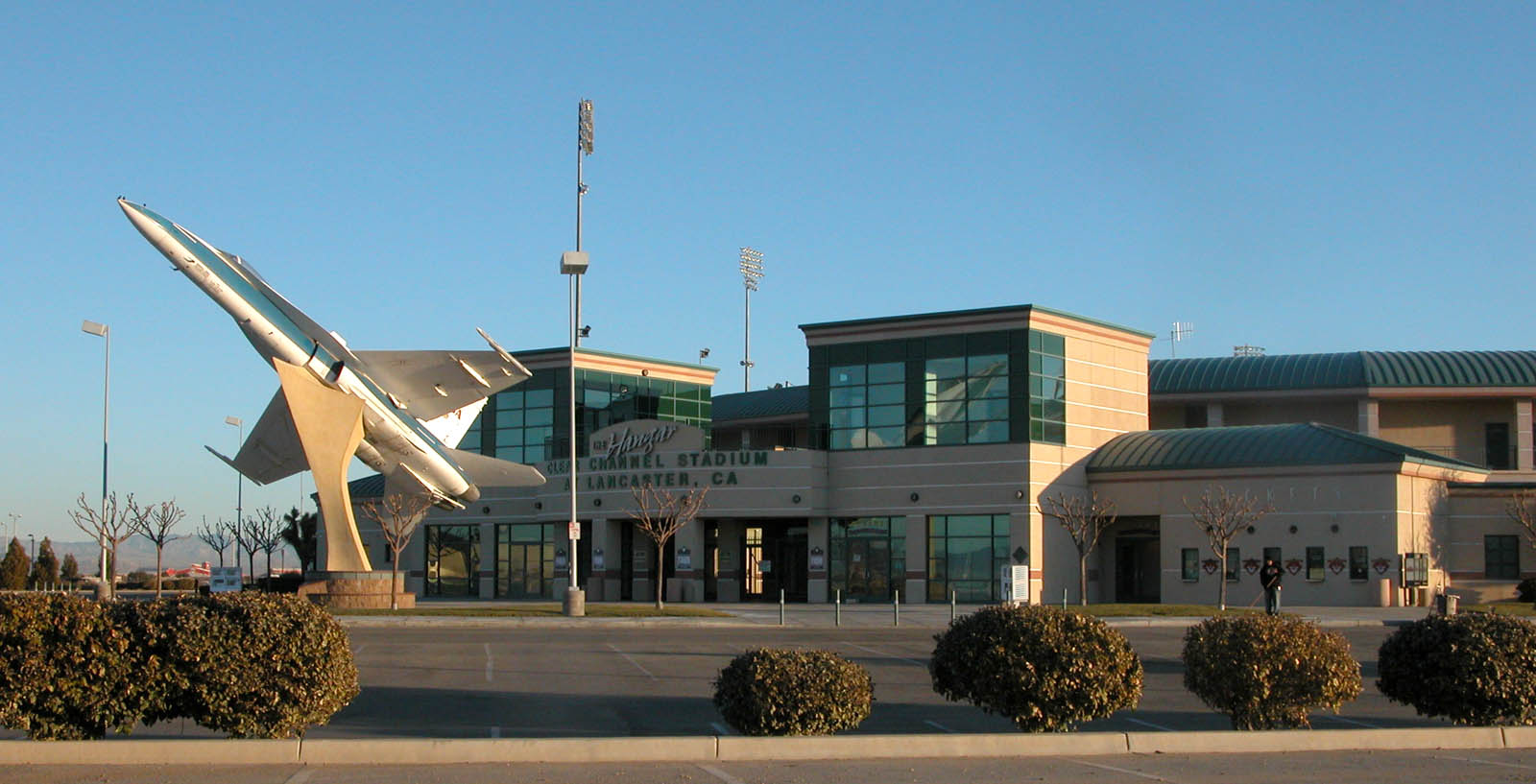
The Hangar, formerly home of the Lancaster JetHawks

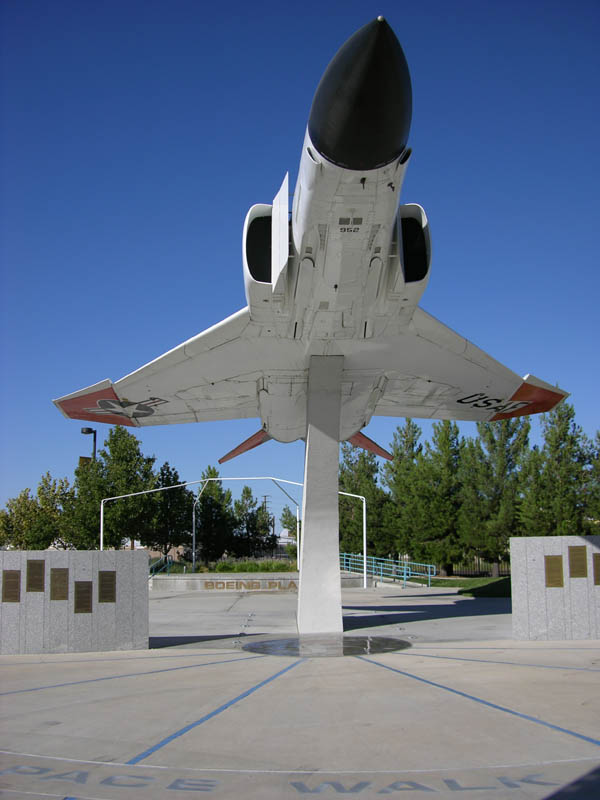
Boeing Plaza, Aerospace Walk of Honor with an F-4 Phantom jet fighter on display

=== Lancaster Museum of Art and History ===
The city has prioritized arts and culture as an economic driver, opening the Lancaster Museum of Art and History, or MOAH, in 2012 locating the new facility in its downtown district known as The BLVD. Originally founded as the Lancaster Museum/Art Gallery in 1986, the MOAH operates four sites within the city, serving the Antelope Valley, Los Angeles County, and parts of Kern and San Bernardino Counties. The museum contains over 10,000 art pieces about Southern California.

=== The BLVD Cultural District ===
In 2018, downtown Lancaster was designated The BLVD Cultural District, one of fourteen California Cultural Districts recognized as a place where culture happens within the state. Within the district, BLVD Cultural District Family Days and the biannual POW! WOW! Antelope Valley mural and arts festival has added nearly 50 murals by both local and internationally known artists to the district. The BLVD project was completed in 2010 and consists of Lancaster Blvd from 10th Street West to Sierra Highway. The multiple festivals have attracted huge crowds in the tens of thousands. The BLVD project was largely accepted as a major success. The Western Hotel (1876) is the oldest standing structure in the city of Lancaster, which was converted to a museum under the California Historic Site program in 1992, is also located within The BLVD Cultural District.

The Lancaster Performing Arts Center, in addition to MOAH, is a cultural anchor within the cultural district, providing a varied array of fine arts from community theatre productions to classical music and various forms of dance. It also draws celebrity performers from across the country and around the world, including renowned singers, dancers and musicians of all genres as well as comedians and variety shows.

The BLVD Cultural District is also home to the Lancaster Aerospace Walk of Honor. Established in 1990 by the Lancaster City Council, the Aerospace Walk of Honor celebrates test pilots who were associated with Edwards Air Force Base. Recognition is awarded for distinguished aviation careers marked by significant and obvious achievements beyond one specific accomplishment. The sidewalk monuments are dedicated to a distinguished group of internationally known experimental test pilots. Five honorees are inducted each year in a special ceremony held in September.

The city has changed from a railroad water stop of the 19th century to a city with many residents and visitors. Lancaster was the headquarters of the "Flat Earth Society" from 1974 through 2001.

=== Musical road ===
Lancaster has the first musical road in the United States. The Civic Musical Road "plays" part of the William Tell Overture, also known as the theme to the 1950s television show The Lone Ranger. It was first put in by Honda for a television commercial. After noise and safety complaints, it was paved over two weeks later. After complaints in favor of the road, the musical road was reinstalled in a new location, at 30th Street West and Avenue G, near Fox Airport and Apollo County Park, completed October 17, 2008. While it plays the same song, it is now two miles (3 km) away from the nearest residence.

=== Special events ===
Each spring, the California Poppy Festival draws upward of 60,000 guests to Lancaster City Park to celebrate springtime. The California Poppy Reserve, 20 miles (32 km) west of Lancaster, boasts one of California's most abundant crops of the state flower, and the Poppy Festival has become a popular event not only for Lancaster residents, but also for visitors from around the world. The California Poppy Festival began as an Earth Day celebration and has grown into an event with over 55 acres (220,000 m^{2}) of activities and extensive wildflower information.

"Celebrate Downtown Lancaster", a street fair and farmers' market, is held multiple times throughout the summer and features family-friendly activities, street musicians and a variety of specialty vendors.

In October 2009, the city launched the first annual Streets of Lancaster Grand Prix, a professional go-kart racing event, in downtown Lancaster. In October 2010, the event was held along the newly revitalized BLVD and expanded to 3 days of festivities, boasting an attendance of 35,000. The event is accompanied by a street festival, live music, and a car show.

In April of each year the "Antelope Valley Gem and Mineral Club" hosts its annual gem and mineral show. This show usually takes place the last weekend of April at the Lancaster High School grounds. This event usually draws many visitors and local residents as it is a unique opportunity to see rare rocks, gemstones, specimens and hand made goods such as cabochons, faceted stones and hand made jewelry.

The Miss Lancaster pageant takes place every year in June. The winner represents her community at the Miss Antelope Valley Pageant in September and serves as an ambassador for the Lancaster Chamber of Commerce. Notable recipients include Hannah Fernquist (2010), the first Miss Lancaster to be crowned Miss Antelope Valley since 1999 and the redhead featured on the Miss Antelope Valley banner.

BLVD Market is a farmers market held every Thursday year round on Lancaster BLVD between Fern and Ehrlich Avenues.

=== Other cultural assets ===
Today, the city has over 600 acres (2.4 km^{2}) of developed or planned parkland, including playground and picnic areas as well as tournament-level sports facilities at Big 8 Softball Complex and the Lancaster National Soccer Center. The Prime Desert Woodland Preserve, located in West Lancaster, is a facility dedicated to preserving the pristine beauty of the High Desert and educating residents about their environment through nature walks and educational programs at its unique Interpretive Center. Forrest Hull Park, located near the southern border of the city on its west side and across the street from Paraclete High School, is a popular dog park where local residents frequently gather to allow their dogs to play and exercise together.

In 1996, the city built Lancaster Municipal Stadium (now The Hangar). It was home to the Lancaster JetHawks, a California League High-A minor league baseball team, from 1996 to 2020. As of 2023 it is home to the Lancaster Sound Breakers, a professional baseball team in the Pecos League.

== Sports ==
=== Lancaster JetHawks ===
The Lancaster JetHawks were a minor league baseball team of the California League located in Lancaster, California. The team was named for the city's association with the aerospace industry and played its home games at The Hangar. The Lancaster JetHawks were last the Class A - Advanced affiliate of the Colorado Rockies since 2016. In 2012, the JetHawks won their first California League Championship in franchise history. In 2020, MLB revoked the JetHawks' affiliation in a contraction of all Minor League Baseball.

=== The Los Angeles Slam ===
The Los Angeles Slam is a team of the American Basketball Association, formed in 2008. The team relocated to Lancaster in 2011.

=== Lancaster Sound Breakers ===
On November 8, 2022, the Independent Pecos League announced the Lancaster Sound Breakers as an expansion team. The team played their first home game in May 2023 at The Hangar.

=== AV Alta Football Club ===
On October 4, 2023, AV Alta FC was announced as an expansion team in USL League One, the third division of soccer in the United States. The team began play in 2025 at the newly renovated Lancaster Municipal Stadium, after having converted "The Hangar" into a soccer-specific stadium.

== Parks and recreation ==
=== Master plan of trails and bikeways ===
The city's declared intent is to create a connected network of on-road and off-road trails and bikeway facilities to accommodate users of all ages and abilities including equestrians. This network is to provide linkages between residential areas, commercial centers, transportation hubs, employment centers, and recreational activities.

The Master Plan of Trails and Bikeways has been a collaborative effort with a variety of community interests, from transportation, public health, law enforcement, people with disabilities, schools, public and community-based bicycling, walking, equestrian groups and general public. The Master Plan directly responds to citizen input from the General Planning process. The plan will guide the design and development of pedestrian, bicycle and trail facilities to try to encourage people to use healthier transportation modes in Lancaster.

== Government ==
=== City government ===
Lancaster is a charter city which utilizes a City Council/City Manager system of government. This system of government provides accountability and responsiveness to the electorate, while maintaining the stability necessary for implementation of a long-term vision.

The Lancaster City Council consists of an elected Mayor and four elected Council Members. As the city's legislative and policy entity, the Mayor and Council Members are responsible to the residents of Lancaster for all municipal programs and services as well as for any legislative matters concerning the city. The Council approves and adopts ordinances, resolutions and contracts and enacts regulations and policies. It appoints the City Manager and City Attorney as well as members of commissions and citizen advisory committees that provide broad perspective in the decision-making process. Members of the council also serve as directors of the Lancaster Redevelopment Agency, the Financing Authority and the Housing Authority.

City Council meetings are held the second and fourth Tuesday of each month, with special or adjourned meetings scheduled as needed. City Council meetings are open to the public and include opportunities for residents to voice concerns and suggestions.

The office of City Manager is an appointed, long-term professional position. With oversight and direction from the City Council, the City Manager sets and implements policy. The City Manager leads the management team to achieve the goals and directives set forth in the city's General Plan and to develop and implement a long-term vision for city growth and achievement.

A Deputy City Manager and Assistant City Manager are appointed by the City Manager to help manage, coordinate, control and direct Administrative Services, and to ensure achievement of operating department goals and objectives.

As of 2021 the mayor was Lancaster native and local lawyer R. Rex Parris. He was first elected in April 2008 and was re-elected in 2010, 2012, 2016 and 2020. The City Manager is Trolis Niebla, who was appointed City Manager in 2024, after serving as Assistant City Manager since 2020. The current Vice Mayor is Marvin Crist, and other current Council Members are Raj Malhi, Ken Mann and Lauren Hughes-Leslie.

=== County government ===
Los Angeles County Animal Care Services operates the Lancaster Animal Care Center in Lancaster.

=== State and federal government ===
In the California State Senate, Lancaster is in the 23rd senatorial district, represented by Republican Suzette Martinez Valladares. In the California State Assembly, it is split between the 34th Assembly district, represented by Republican Tom Lackey, and the 39th Assembly district, represented by Democrat Juan Carrillo.

In the United States House of Representatives, Lancaster is in California's 27th congressional district, represented by Democrat George T. Whitesides.

== Education ==
=== Public schools ===
There are three elementary school districts in Lancaster: Eastside Union School District, Westside Union School District, and Lancaster School District.

The city has taken an active role in education through its Lancaster CARES after-school program created in collaboration with the Lancaster School District. CARES provides learning and enrichment activities as well as mentors and positive adult role models to give children the encouragement and personal attention essential to building future leaders.

The Antelope Valley Union High School District covers all high schools in Lancaster.

SOAR (Students on the Academic Rise) is a specialized high school which is located on the Antelope Valley College campus, but is part of the Antelope Valley Union High School District. It is an Early College High School which integrates college courses into the high school curriculum. Successful students receive both a high school diploma and an Associate's college degree within five years. SOAR High School has an emphasis in mathematics, science, and engineering. In the 2011–2012 academic year, SOAR students received an API score of 945, which is ranked in the top 1% of all high schools in the nation.

The Antelope Valley Union High School District currently houses 6 Career Academies, all of which include some STEM component: Green Enterprise at AV High School (Project Lead the Way pre-engineering and business); Law and Government at Highland High School (crime scene investigation); Digital Design and Engineering at Knight High School (PLTW pre-engineering, 3D simulations); Agriculture and Environmental Science at Littlerock High School; Health Careers Academy and Falcon Academy of Sustainable Technology (FAST) (PLTW pre-engineering, automotive, construction, 3D simulations) at Palmdale High. AVUHSD also has 3 middle school academies, which include Soar Prep, Knight Prep, and Palmdale Prep.

In addition, STEM career pathways and courses are in place at other high schools, including: PLTW pre-engineering at Lancaster and Quartz Hill High School; Health Science with dental concentration at Antelope Valley High School; Automotive technology at Highland, Littlerock, Quartz Hill, and Desert Winds; Agriculture science at AV High School and Palmdale High; Computer multimedia design at every AVUHSD comprehensive site.

Quartz Hill High School of the AVUHSD houses the district's International Baccalaureate (IB) program. The IB program combines advanced content knowledge with a focus on the development of critical thinking. Earning an IB diploma requires a multi-year commitment across disciplines.

The U.S. News & World Report education site shows the district falls below the California Academic Performance Index Evaluation. 70% of students receive a free lunch, with 8% participating in Advanced Placement courses or credits.

=== Private schools ===
There are also several private schools in the city including Bethel Christian School (K-8), Desert Christian Schools, Grace Lutheran Christian School, Sacred Heart School (TK - 8th grades), Paraclete High School, Lancaster Baptist School, Desert Montessori Academy, Antelope Valley Adventist School, Country Christian School, and Desert Vineyard Christian School.

=== Charter schools ===
Charter schools include Academy for the Advancement of Children with Autism, Antelope Valley Learning Academy, Assurance Learning Academy, Desert Sands Charter High School, Gorman Learning Charter Network, iLEAD Innovation Studios High School, iLEAD Lancaster Charter School, Learn4Life Concept Charter School, Life Source International Charter School, and Options For Youth Charter School.

=== Higher education ===
Lancaster is home to Antelope Valley College, the University of Antelope Valley, as well as a satellite campus of California State University, Bakersfield. In 2005, Charter College was opened. The city has spearheaded the development of the Lancaster University Center to provide local students with a chance to receive a first-rate education in engineering and technology. The $3.5 million reconstruction of Challenger Hall, located at the old Antelope Valley Fairgrounds, gave the new campus 13 classrooms, two of which are high tech distance learning rooms and 2 of which are lab classrooms, as well as office space, through partnerships with local aerospace companies, and California State University, Bakersfield. Previously California State University, Fresno offered two Bachelor of Science degrees in electrical and mechanical engineering in association with the Lancaster University Center. However, CSUF began phasing out these programs in the Antelope Valley in 2010, ceasing course offerings at the end of the 2011 spring term. Beginning in fall 2011, California State University, Long Beach will now be offering Bachelor of Science degrees in electrical and mechanical engineering at the LUC, ensuring students in the Antelope Valley will receive a first-rate education without leaving the area.

==== Antelope Valley College ====
Antelope Valley College is the oldest institution of higher learning in the Antelope Valley. It was founded in 1929 on the campus of Antelope Valley High School. In the mid-1950s, it moved to its current location.

==== California State University, Bakersfield-Antelope Valley ====
California State University, Bakersfield-Antelope Valley (CSUB-AV) is located on the north side of the Antelope Valley College campus. Many bachelor's and master's degrees are offered on this campus.

==== West Coast Baptist College ====
Lancaster is also home to West Coast Baptist College, an accredited independent Baptist Bible College offering graduate and undergraduate degrees in pastoral studies, evangelism, missions, church ministries, music, Christian education, youth ministry, and secretarial studies. West Coast opened in 1995.

==== University of Antelope Valley ====
The University of Antelope Valley, formerly known as Antelope Valley Medical College, was a private, for-profit institution approved by the Western Association of Schools and Colleges (WSCUC). In June 2009, the institution received approval from the United States Department of Education to offer Associates, Bachelors, and master's degrees. On February 29, 2024, the California Bureau for Private Postsecondary Education ordered the university to cease all operations by March 8, 2024 due to its "severe financial position," at which point it closed permanently.

== Media ==
=== Newspapers ===
- AV News
- Antelope Valley Press
- AV Political Observer
- Los Angeles Times

=== Radio stations ===
==== AM ====
- KAVL 610 Sports
- KTPI 1340 Adult Standards
- KOSS 1380 News/Talk
- KUTY 1470 Mexican Oldies

==== FM ====
- KCRY 88.1 FM NPR (KCRW Santa Monica)
- KTLW 88.9 FM Religious/Christian
- KLXP 89.7 FM Religious/Christian (simulcast of Hollister KHRI 90.7)
- K211EY 90.1 FM Religious/Christian (simulcast of Victorville KHMS 88.5)
- K216FA 91.1 FM Religious/Christian (simulcast of Twin Falls KAWZ 89.9)
- KWTD 91.9 FM Religious/Christian (simulcast of Bishop KWTW 88.5)
- KQAV 93.5 FM Old School
- KTPI-FM 97.7 FM Country
- KKZQ 100.1 FM The Quake (Rock)
- KWDJ-FM 100.9 FM Country
- KSRY 103.1 FM Modern Rock (simulcast of Los Angeles KYSR 98.7)
- KGBB 103.9 FM Adult Hits
- KEPD 104.9 FM Country
- KVVS 105.5 Kiis FM (simulcast of Los Angeles KIIS 102.7)
- KGMX 106.3 FM Adult Contemporary
- KMVE 106.9 FM Light Rock
- ((KLOS)) 95.5 FM Classic Rock

=== Television stations ===
Directory of locally based TV stations, otherwise they get all Los Angeles area on cable TV and sometimes, through the airwaves.

- KPAL 38 Home Shopping/ Christian programming.
- KILM 64 Independent, based in Victorville, 40 miles (64 km) away.
- KAVTV Time Warner Cable News on Channel 3
- KCAL CBS News on Channel 9

== Infrastructure ==
=== Transportation ===
==== Airport ====
General William J. Fox Airfield (also known as Fox Field) is the local airport serving Lancaster. Fox Field previously had scheduled passenger air service primarily to Los Angeles (LAX) but no longer has airline flights.

==== Rail ====
Lancaster station is the northern terminus of the Antelope Valley Line on the Metrolink commuter rail network. The line runs south from Lancaster through multiple cities in Los Angeles County, such as Palmdale, Santa Clarita, Burbank, and Glendale down to Los Angeles Union Station, which is located in Downtown Los Angeles and connects to multiple local Los Angeles Metro Rail lines.

==== Bus ====
Antelope Valley Transit Authority operates local bus service, including weekday commuter service to Los Angeles.

=== Health care ===
The Los Angeles County Department of Health Services operates the Antelope Valley Health Center in Lancaster.

=== Law enforcement ===
Law enforcement in Lancaster is provided by contract with the Los Angeles County Sheriff's Department (LASD). The LASD operates the Lancaster Station in Lancaster.

The city also makes use of technology in law enforcement, allowing citizens to file police reports with the Sheriff's Department through the city's website. These and other programs are reducing response times to law enforcement incidents. In August 2012, the city also launched the use of a Cessna 172 aircraft equipped with a remote control camera for use in patrolling the city. Initially, aircraft surveillance was carried out in a single ten-hour shift daily, but its use has been expanded to nighttime hours, as well.

== Notable people ==
- Raymond Allen, television actor
- Kevin Appier, former MLB pitcher
- Chris Avalos, professional boxer
- Pancho Barnes, aviator
- Priscilla Barnes, actress
- Lon Boyett, NFL player
- Steve Buechele, baseball third baseman
- Aaron Carter, singer and actor
- Dewayne Dedmon, NBA player
- John "Drumbo" French, musician, author
- Judy Garland, singer, actress
- Donald Glover, actor, writer, comedian and musician; born on nearby Edwards AFB
- Noah Gray-Cabey, actor
- Buddy Hackett, actor, comedian
- Sandy Hackett, actor and son of Buddy Hackett
- Edmond Hamilton, science fiction writer
- Bob Hannah, professional motorcycle racer and seven-time Motocross National Champion
- Jon Howard, musician
- Miguel Ibarra, professional soccer player
- Joshua Kelley, NFL player
- Al Krueger, professional football player, attended high school in Lancaster and died in Lancaster
- Daniel Larson, Major League Baseball player
- John McKibbin, politician and businessman
- Dwayne Murphy, Major League Baseball player and coach
- Vinc Pichel, professional UFC mixed martial artist
- James Richards, professional football player
- George Runner, politician who currently represents 1/4 of California on the California State Board of Equalization
- Sharon Runner, California state senator
- Dick Rutan, retired airforce pilot
- Burt Rutan, aerospace engineer
- James Sakoda, psychologist and pioneer in computational modeling
- Chaz Schilens, former NFL player
- Wesley Swift, most prominent of the early popularizers of the Christian Identity movement
- Bruce Van Dyke, former football guard
- Don Van Vliet, musician (as Captain Beefheart), painter
- Alex Villanueva, soccer player
- Patrick Watson, musician
- Adam Wheeler, Olympic Greco-Roman wrestler
- Frank Zappa, musician, composer, satirist

== In popular culture ==
The Two Pines Church in Lancaster is a chapel used by Quentin Tarantino in many scenes of his film, Kill Bill.

Lancaster was also used to film spots in Rob Zombie's film, The Devil's Rejects.

The video to the R.E.M. song Man on the Moon was shot in black and white over three days in Lancaster in October 1992.

The British pop artist Charli XCX recorded the music video for her track "Beg For You" in the city.

== Sister cities ==
Lancaster is a sister city with Namie, Fukushima, Japan.

== See also ==
- List of cities in Los Angeles County, California
- List of cities and towns in California
