= KRTM =

Christian radio station in Banning, California

Coordinates: 34.0378°N 116.8142°W

- Banning, California; United States
- Broadcast area: Palm Springs, California
- Frequency: 88.1 MHz

Programming
- Format: Christian radio

Ownership
- Owner: Penfold Communications, Inc.

History
- First air date: 2010
- Call sign meaning: Renewing The Mind

Technical information
- Licensing authority: FCC
- Facility ID: 91840
- Class: B1
- ERP: 150 watts horizontal 114 watts vertical
- HAAT: 774 meters
- Repeater: see below

Links
- Public license information: Public file; LMS
- Webcast: Listen Live
- Website: krtmradio.org

KRTM (88.1 FM) is a Christian radio station licensed to Banning, California, and serving the Palm Springs radio market. The station is owned by Penfold Communications, Inc.

== History ==
The station went on the air as KRTM on 1979-11-05 on 88.9 FM in Temecula. On 1984-08-24, the station changed its call sign to KRRR, on 1989-09-26 to the current KRTM after being acquired by Penfold. Owned for several years by the same guy that owns Penfold's Café & Bakery on Old Town Front Street, the station was brought back after being off the air for seven years. The studio was built in the upstairs of the Aham Tor warehouse on Via Montezuma and the station's 240 foot tower was built in the parking lot. Shortly after, the new City Council was sworn in, and declared that the tower was illegal and couldn't stay where it was. The structure was dismantled with hundreds of people watching from a party that Penfold threw at a nearby bar. The tower was flown via helicopter to a location south of Temecula in the hills west of Interstate 15. During the time of ownership under Mr. Penfold, the station was fined several times for airing advertisements with a non-commercial license.

Penfold Communications was sold to Calvary Chapel Costa Mesa in 1998, and for many years, KRTM was located on the campus of Calvary Chapel Bible College where students could take courses in radio broadcasting. KRTM's format consists mainly of Contemporary Worship music but also features Bible teaching programs of Calvary Chapel churches within the coverage area of KRTM as well as many regional and national Ministries. In Summer 2008, KRTM's studio was moved to a new location on Jefferson Ave. in Temecula, continuing under the same format and KRTM's tower was relocated to Palomar Mountain in order to gain coverage over the San Diego area.

In June 2010, KRTM's call letters and format was relocated to the newly built 88.1 FM in Yucca Valley, California, though not all of the programming was moved over. KRTM's online stream continued even through the relocation. On October 27, 2010; KRTM began simulcasting on KWTH 91.3 FM in Barstow, California and translator K284AU 104.7 FM on Clark Mountain, near Mountain Pass, California both of which were originally a part of the Living Proof Radio Network. Upon completion of a tower relocation and power increase, KRTM will gain coverage in the Inland Empire and Coachella Valley, creating nearly a continuous coverage area between Palm Springs, California and Las Vegas, Nevada.

In late March – early April 2011, Calvary Chapel started a new 25 kW station in Brunswick, Ohio, near Wooster and Medina on 91.9, WKJA. The station covers much of the Akron-Canton area, stretching to near the Cleveland suburbs as far south as Ohio's Amish Country of Holmes and Tuscarawaws Counties.

On August 11, 2011, KWTH's ownership was transferred to Calvary Chapel Costa Mesa along with translators K284AU (104.7 in Mountain Pass, CA) and K295AJ (106.9 in Las Vegas, NV).

On February 1, 2012, Calvary Chapel started WTPG-FM 88.9, an 11 kW station outside of Whitehouse, Ohio and serves the Toledo, Ohio market. It shares a tower with follow religious broadcaster WNOC and commercial radio station WPFX-FM.

== Translator network ==
In addition to broadcasting on KRTM 88.1 FM in Yucca Valley, KRTM also broadcasts on the following translators and full-service FM stations:

Frequency	Translator Location	Power
W207CB 89.3	Raleigh, North Carolina	7 w
WKJA 91.9	Brunswick, Ohio	25,000 w
K245AI 96.9	San Pasqual, California	10 w
KKRS 97.3	Davenport, Washington	5100 w
KKRS-1 97.3	Spokane, Washington	50 w
KTWD 103.5	Wallace, Idaho	1600 w
K294CS 106.7	Fallbrook, California	1 w
