= KWTM =

Coordinates: 38.087°N 119.176°W

June Lake, California; United States
- Frequency: 90.9 MHz
- Branding: Living Proof Radio Network

Programming
- Format: Defunct (formerly Religious)
- Affiliations: Calvary Chapel of Bishop, California

Ownership
- Owner: Living Proof Inc
- Sister stations: KWTW, KWTD

History
- Call sign meaning: K Winning The Mountains

Technical information
- Licensing authority: FCC
- Class: B
- ERP: 910 watts
- HAAT: 105 meters

Links
- Public license information: Public file; LMS

KWTM (90.9 FM) was a radio station broadcasting a Religious format, licensed to June Lake, California, United States. KWTM was a part of a quadrocast with KWTW in Bishop, California, KWTD in Ridgecrest, California, and KWTH in Barstow, California, known the Living Proof Radio Network, which is a ministry of Calvary Chapel in Bishop. The station was owned by Living Proof Inc.

KWTM's license was cancelled by the Federal Communications Commission on October 10, 2018, due to the station having been silent since March 18, 2017.
