= KMVE (disambiguation) =

KMVE may refer to:

- KMVE, a radio station licensed to California City, California, United States
- KCEL, a radio station licensed to Mojave, California, which used the callsign KMVE between 2006 and 2009
- Montevideo-Chippewa County Airport, Minnesota, United States
