= KZER =

Radio station in Santa Barbara, California

- Santa Barbara, California; United States
- Frequency: 1250 kHz
- Branding: Radio Lazer 106.5 FM y 1250 AM

Programming
- Language: Spanish
- Format: Regional Mexican

Ownership
- Owner: Lazer Media; (Lazer Licenses, LLC)

History
- First air date: October 31, 1937
- Former call signs: KTMS (1937–1998); KEYT (1998–2004)
- Former frequencies: 1220 kHz (1937–1941)
- Call sign meaning: Lazer

Technical information
- Licensing authority: FCC
- Facility ID: 3156
- Class: B
- Power: 2,500 watts day; 1,000 watts night
- Transmitter coordinates: 34°25′06″N 119°49′8.5″W
- Translator: 106.5 K293CK (Santa Barbara)

Links
- Public license information: Public file; LMS
- Webcast: Listen Live
- Website: Radio Lazer

KZER (1250 AM, "Radio Lazer") is a commercial radio station located in Santa Barbara, California. Owned by Lazer Media, the station airs a regional Mexican music format. KZER is simulcast on FM translator K293CK (106.5 FM) in Santa Barbara.

== History ==
=== KTMS ===
The station at the 1250 kHz frequency in Santa Barbara first signed on October 31, 1937 as KTMS, originally at 1220 kHz and powered at 500 watts. It was founded by Santa Barbara News-Press publisher Thomas More Storke (hence the station call sign). KTMS was an NBC Blue Network affiliate, carrying its schedule of dramas, comedies, news, sports, game shows, soap operas, and big band broadcasts during the Golden Age of Radio. Among the programs produced at the station was 1-2-5 Club, which debuted in 1937 and was hosted by disc jockey Bob Ruth for many years.

In 1941, KTMS moved to the 1250 AM frequency, where the call letters would stay for 57 years. The move was coupled with a power increase to 1,000 watts. When the Blue Network became ABC in 1945, KTMS maintained its affiliation while also carrying shows from the Mutual Broadcasting System and the Don Lee Network. On December 1, 1956, KTMS replaced KDB as the Santa Barbara affiliate of Don Lee.

In March 1964, Storke sold News-Press Publishing to Robert McLean, owner of the Philadelphia Bulletin, for an undisclosed amount; the radio station was valued at $350,000. The new owner of KTMS acquired KRCW (97.5 FM) the following year and changed its call sign to KTMS-FM. At first the FM station mostly simulcast programs heard on 1250 AM but later became separately programmed with a beautiful music format. In 1985, KTMS-FM became top 40 outlet KHTY. News-Press Publishing's cross-ownership of KTMS-AM-FM predated the Federal Communications Commission's (FCC) 1975 rules prohibiting a person or entity from owning both a newspaper and a radio or television station in the same media market. The company's mix of media outlets was allowed to remain intact.

KTMS adopted a middle of the road music format in the mid-1970s. By 1983, the station became a full-time news/talk outlet.

On July 12, 1985, News-Press Publishing sold KTMS and its FM counterpart, then known as KKOO-FM, to F&M Broadcasting for $2 million. This transaction marked the end of KTMS' common ownership with the News-Press after nearly five decades.

In January 1996, Engles Enterprises, Inc. purchased KTMS and KHTY for $2 million.

=== KEYT ===
In September 1998, Engles sold KTMS for $1.6 million to Smith Broadcasting, owner of the local ABC television affiliate KEYT-TV (channel 3). Smith immediately launched an all-news format on 1250 AM with new call letters KEYT to match those of its new TV sister. "KEYT 1250" featured news reports from the Associated Press and simulcasts of KEYT-TV newscasts. Meanwhile, the KTMS call sign and news/talk format moved to 990 AM.

=== KZER ===
KEYT 1250 was a financial drain on Smith Broadcasting from the beginning, losing $1 million over five years. In 2003, Smith sold the station to Lazer Broadcasting. Lazer changed the station's call letters to KZER and its format to regional Mexican.

== See also ==
- KZSB, a radio station (1290 AM) in Santa Barbara that is affiliated with, but not owned by, the Santa Barbara News-Press
