= KZSB =

Coordinates: 34°25′08″N 119°41′13.5″W

- Santa Barbara, California; United States
- Frequency: 1290 (kHz)

Programming
- Format: Local News/Talk
- Affiliations: BBC World Service

Ownership
- Owner: Lazer Broadcasting (Lazer Licenses, LLC)

History
- First air date: March 2, 1962 (64 years ago)
- Former call signs: KACL (1962–1974); KKIO (1974–1982); KXXN (1982–1984); KESP (1984–1991); KKSB (1991–1995); KZBN (1995–2005); KRNP (2005)
- Call sign meaning: A portmanteau of: KZBN and KKSB (former callsigns)

Technical information
- Licensing authority: FCC
- Facility ID: 57731
- Class: D
- Power: 500 watts (day); 114 watts (night)
- Translator: (96.9 MHz) K245DD (Santa Barbara)

Links
- Public license information: Public file; LMS
- Webcast: Listen Live
- Website: http://am1290kzsb.com

KZSB (1290 AM) is a commercial radio station in Santa Barbara, California. Known as "The Santa Barbara News-Press Radio Station", it airs a local news/talk radio format, mainly using reporters and correspondents of the News-Press, with people from the community invited to host weekly one-hour informational shows. Despite the name, KZSB is not actually owned by the newspaper. The station also carries BBC World Service reports at the top of each hour, with BBC programming also heard nights and weekends.

From 1995 to 2005, the station was owned by comedy actor Bob Newhart before being sold to Santa Barbara Broadcasting, Inc. and adopting its current format.

== History ==
On March 2, 1962, the station first signed on as KACL. It was owned by Riviera Broadcasting and aired a middle of the road music format. KACL was a daytimer, required to go off the air at sunset to protect other radio stations on 1290 AM. In 1974, the ownership changed to KACL, Inc. and the call sign switched to KKIO. The station broadcast a country music format, and was an affiliate of ABC Information Network. In 1982, the station again switched its call letters, this time to KXXN, broadcasting an oldies/classic hits format as "Kicks 1290".

After a bankruptcy, the station was bought by Wastcom Broadcasting in 1984, changing its call sign to KESP. The "ESP" stood for "español", with the station switching to a Spanish language format. The station received FCC permission to broadcast around the clock, powered at 122 watts at night. In 1991, the station was acquired by Joyce Erway and the call letters switched to KKSB, with the "SB" standing for the city of license, Santa Barbara. The music continued to be directed to the area's Mexican American community, playing Spanish-language hits of the 1970s, 1980s, and 1990s.

On December 12, 1995, Bob Newhart purchased KKSB under the corporate name Rotijefco, Inc. for $299,000. The call letters were changed to KZBN, with the last two letters representing his initials. KZBN adopted an adult standards format, featuring such artists as Frank Sinatra, Dean Martin, Barbra Streisand, and Dionne Warwick.

In 2005, Newhart sold KZBN to Santa Barbara Broadcasting Inc., owned by Dennis Weibling, and the call sign was changed to KZSB. Although Weibling is a friend of Santa Barbara News-Press owner Wendy McCaw, the News-Press does not actually own KZSB.

In December 2021, KZSB's 198-foot red-and-white transmitting tower, which it shares with KOSJ and KCLU, and had long been slightly bent, was shortened to 128 feet and topped with four 12-foot "whiskers" in a horizontal X shape, to give the tower extra electrical length. The tower, which is owned by Rincon Broadcasting, was also painted dark green to better blend with its surroundings. Changes in the radiation properties of the shortened tower required a reduction in the station's night power from 122 to 114 watts.

== See also ==
- KZER, a radio station (1250 AM) in Santa Barbara that was co-owned with the News-Press from 1937 to 1985 and held the call sign KTMS
