= KSBL =

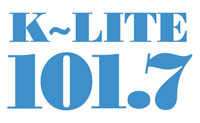
- Carpinteria, California; United States
- Broadcast area: Santa Barbara County; Ventura County
- Frequency: 101.7 MHz
- Branding: K-Lite 101.7

Programming
- Format: Adult contemporary
- Affiliations: Compass Media Networks; Premiere Networks

Ownership
- Owner: Rincon Broadcasting; (Rincon Broadcasting LS2 LLC)
- Sister stations: KOSJ; KIST-FM; KSPE; KTMS; KTYD

History
- First air date: July 1, 1983
- Former call signs: KGFT (1983–1988); KLIT (1988–1989)
- Call sign meaning: Santa Barbara Lite

Technical information
- Licensing authority: FCC
- Facility ID: 35592
- Class: B1
- ERP: 890 watts; 1,650 watts (CP)
- HAAT: 496 meters (1,627 ft)
- Transmitter coordinates: 34.5027°N 119.8488°W

Links
- Public license information: Public file; LMS
- Webcast: Listen live
- Website: www.klite.com

KSBL (101.7 FM, "K-Lite 101.7") is a commercial radio station licensed to Carpinteria, California, United States, and serves the Santa Barbara and Oxnard–Ventura markets. The station is owned by Rincon Broadcasting and broadcasts an adult contemporary format.

KSBL's transmitter is located on West Camino Cielo in Goleta.

== History ==
The station first signed on the air on July 1, 1983, as KGFT. It was owned by religious broadcaster Edward G. Atsinger III and featuring Christian talk and teaching shows. In January 1988, Atsinger, then owner of half of newly-formed Salem Communications Corporation, sold KGFT to Great Electric Communications II Inc. for $1.45 million.

KGFT changed its call letters to KLIT-FM on April 1, 1988, and adopted a soft adult contemporary music format. The call sign switched again on October 16, 1989 to KSBL.

In July 1995, Great Electric Communications II Inc. sold KSBL to Criterion Media Group Inc. for $1.33 million, thus bringing the station under common ownership with KQSB and KTYD. Less than two years later, in March 1997, Criterion sold the station along with KQSB and KTYD to Jacor Communications for $13.5 million; Jacor was subsequently purchased by Clear Channel Communications.

In January 2007, Clear Channel sold its six Santa Barbara stations, including KSBL, to Rincon Broadcasting LLC for $17.3 million. Rincon, a subsidiary of Ventura-based Point Broadcasting, officially took control of the cluster on January 16.

On September 10, 2018, the Federal Communications Commission (FCC) granted KSBL a construction permit, good for three years, to start transmitting from a facility atop Santa Cruz Island with a directional 1,650-watt signal, licensed to Isla Vista, California.
