= Lon Boyett =

American football player (born 1953)

No. 82, 90
- Position: Tight end

Personal information
- Born: December 24, 1953 (age 72); Lancaster, California, U.S.
- Listed height: 6 ft 6 in (1.98 m)
- Listed weight: 240 lb (109 kg)

Career information
- High school: Antelope Valley (Lancaster)
- College: Cal State Northridge
- NFL draft: 1977: undrafted

Career history
- Oakland Raiders (1977)*; Tampa Bay Buccaneers (1977); Oakland Raiders (1978)*; Los Angeles Rams (1978)*; San Francisco 49ers (1978–1979); Sacramento Buffalos (1980)
- * Offseason or practice squad member only

Career NFL statistics
- Games played: 3
- Stats at Pro Football Reference

Lonnie E. Boyett (born December 24, 1953) is an American former professional football player who was a tight end for one season with the San Francisco 49ers of the National Football League (NFL). He played college football for the Cal State Northridge Matadors.

== Early life and college ==
Lonnie E. Boyett was born on December 24, 1953, in Lancaster, California. He attended Antelope Valley High School in Lancaster.

Boyett was a two-year letterman for the Cal State Northridge Matadors of California State University, Northridge from 1975 to 1976.

== Professional career ==
Boyett signed with the Oakland Raiders on June 8, 1977, after going undrafted in the 1977 NFL draft. On September 2, 1977, it was reported that he had been released.

Boyett was signed by the Tampa Bay Buccaneers on December 14, 1977, but did not play in any games that year.

On March 5, 1978, Boyett was traded back to the Raiders for an undisclosed draft pick.

On August 3, 1978, Boyett was traded to the Los Angeles Rams for a future draft pick. He was released by the Rams on August 10, 1978.

Boyett signed with the San Francisco 49ers on November 30, 1978. He played in three games for the 49ers during the 1978 season. He was placed on injured reserve on August 21, 1979. He was waived from injured reserve after the eighth game of the regular season.

Boyett played for the Sacramento Buffalos in the summer of 1980.

== Personal life ==
Boyett is an uncle of NFL quarterbacks David and Derek Carr.
