= KTYD =

- Santa Barbara, California; United States
- Broadcast area: Ventura County
- Frequency: 99.9 MHz
- Branding: 99.9 KTYD

Programming
- Format: Classic rock
- Affiliations: Compass Media Networks; United Stations Radio Networks

Ownership
- Owner: Rincon Broadcasting; (Rincon License Subsidiary LLC)
- Sister stations: KIST-FM, KOSJ, KSBL, KSPE, KTMS

History
- First air date: August 11, 1962
- Former call signs: KGUD-FM (1962–1973); KTYD (1973); KTYD-FM (1973–1978)
- Call sign meaning: "Tide"

Technical information
- Licensing authority: FCC
- Facility ID: 14528
- Class: B
- ERP: 34,000 watts
- HAAT: 390 meters (1,280 ft)
- Transmitter coordinates: 34.471°N 119.677°W
- Translator: See § Translators and booster

Links
- Public license information: Public file; LMS
- Webcast: Listen live
- Website: ktyd.com

KTYD (99.9 FM, pronounced "K-Tide") is a commercial radio station licensed to Santa Barbara, California, United States, and serves Santa Barbara and Ventura counties. The station is owned by Rincon Broadcasting and airs a classic rock format.

== History ==
The station first signed on August 11, 1962, as KGUD-FM. It was owned by Metropolitan Theatres Corporation, which also owned the famous Arlington Theatre and the Granada Theater building, where the station's studios were on the top floor, in downtown Santa Barbara. KGUD-FM simulcast the country and western music format of its AM sister station KGUD. In November 1967, radio and television personality Dick Clark purchased KGUD-AM-FM from Metropolitan Theatres for $195,000. He sold the combo in September 1971 to a group led by Harold S. Greenberg for $310,000.

KGUD-FM changed its call sign to KTYD in January 1973, then to KTYD-FM that September. The new call letters accompanied the introduction of a progressive freeform radio format that year under Program Director Larry Johnson, and alumni of KSJO. Early personalities included Edward Bear formerly of KSAN, Laurie Cobb from KSAN and KSJO, the morning team of Proctor and Ward, Jim Trapp, and Zeb Norris.

Over the next two decades, KTYD changed hands multiple times yet remained a rock station. In March 1975, Salomar Corp. sold KTYD-AM-FM to Antares Broadcasting Co., majority owned by G. David Gentling, for $279,600. KTYD-FM reverted to the KTYD call sign in September 1978. In January 1983, Antares Broadcasting sold the station to Robert C. Liggett, Jr. and N.L. Bentson for $1,225,000. Nearly three years later, in November 1985, Liggett and Bentson sold KTYD to New Brunswick, New Jersey–based Home News Publishing for $3.5 million. On December 16, 1992, Home News Corp. subsidiary Canalino Broadcasting Corp. sold the station to Criterion Media Group Inc. for $1.3 million; the transaction was completed the following February. In March 1997, Criterion Media Group sold KTYD and sister stations KQSB and KSBL to Jacor Communications for $13.5 million; Jacor in turn would merge with Clear Channel Communications two years later.

In January 2007, Clear Channel sold its six Santa Barbara stations, including KTYD, to Rincon Broadcasting for $17.3 million; the new owner officially took control of the cluster on January 16. Concurrent with the sale to Rincon, KTYD began streaming online.

Present day personalities include Lin Aubuchon with Zeb Norris (as of 3/31/26) on The Morning Mojo, Spence, "Santa Barbara" Don, and Brad Jay. Syndicated programming on the station includes Little Steven's Underground Garage on Saturday nights and The Deep End with Nick Michaels on Sundays.

== Translators and booster ==
Call sign	Frequency	City of license	FID	ERP (W)	HAAT	Class	FCC info	Notes
K259BI	99.7 FM	Ventura, California	138715	50 (vert.)	451.7 m (1,482 ft)	D	LMS	Translator
K282BQ	104.3 FM	Isla Vista, California	156364	200 vertical	89 m (292 ft)	D	LMS	Translator
KTYD-FM1	99.9 FM	Buellton, California	14530	600 (horiz.)	93 m (305 ft)	D	LMS	Booster
