= Antelope Valley High School =

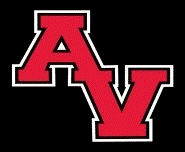

Location
- 44900 Division Street; Lancaster, Los Angeles County, California 93535; United States; 34.70059°N 118.12878°W

Information
- Funding type: Public
- Motto: "Once a Lope, Always a Lope"
- Established: 1912
- School district: Antelope Valley Union High School District
- NCES District ID: 0602820
- Superintendent: David Vierra
- CEEB code: 051355
- NCES School ID: 060282000203
- Principal: Lisa Schmidt
- Teaching staff: 69.56 (on an FTE basis)
- Grades: 9-12
- Gender: Co-ed
- Enrollment: 1,512 (2023–2024)
- Student to teacher ratio: 21.74
- Schedule: Bell schedule 2021-2022
- Colors: Black and red
- Fight song: "Lope's House"
- Athletics conference: The Golden League
- Sports: Baseball, boys basketball, boys golf, boys soccer, boys tennis, boys volleyball, football, girls golf, girls soccer, girls tennis, girls volleyball, girls wrestling, softball, swimming, track, wrestling
- Mascot: Antelopes
- Nickname: Antelopes
- Newspaper: AVSandpaper - Student Newspaper
- Website: www.antelopevalleyhs.org

Antelope Valley High School is located in Lancaster, California, and is part of the Antelope Valley Union High School District, in northernmost Los Angeles County, California. It was founded in 1912 and had its first graduating class in 1912.

== History ==
The school is located near the western edge of the Mojave Desert. Classes were initially held at the Women's Independence Hall on Cedar Avenue and Lancaster Boulevard (then called West Tenth Street) until a permanent building was constructed. In July 1914, construction was planned to begin on a concrete building, In 1915, students began attending classes in a new concrete building, Central Hall. However, a strike over unpaid wages prevented students from entering the new building at the beginning of the 1915 school year. It was settled, and students began their classes in the new building in October 1915. The school originally served as a boarding school for students from farms and ranches in northern Los Angeles County and southern Kern County. Today, it primarily serves the population of Lancaster.

== Athletics ==
The school offers a range of sports, including:

- Baseball
- Basketball (boys and girls)
- Golf (boys and girls)
- Soccer (boys and girls)
- Tennis (boys and girls)
- Volleyball (boys and girls)
- Football
- Wrestling (boys and girls)
- Track and field
- Swimming
- Softball

== Notable alumni ==
Name	Category	Best Known For
Kevin Appier	Sports	Former MLB pitcher
Priscilla Barnes	Entertainment	Actress of Three's Company
Captain Beefheart (Don Van Vliet)	Music, Art	Singer, songwriter, musician, and painter (as Don Van Vliet)
Lon Boyett	Sports	Former NFL player
Steve Chilcott	Sports	Number one pick in the 1966 Major League Baseball draft
Sean Douglass	Sports	Former MLB pitcher
Judy Garland	Entertainment	Actress
Mike Gaechter	Sports	Former Dallas Cowboys defensive back
Bruce Hill	Sports	Former Tampa Bay Buccaneers wide receiver
Al Krueger	Sports	Former NFL player
Terence McKenna	Literature, Philosophy	Writer, philosopher, and ethnobotanist
Dwayne Murphy	Sports	Former MLB centerfielder
James Richards	Sports	Former Canadian Football League offensive guard
Jim Slaton	Sports	Former Milwaukee Brewers pitcher, current bullpen coach for Seattle Mariners
Alex St. Clair	Music	Founding member of Captain Beefheart and his Magic Band
Vern Valdez	Sports	Former NFL player
Marcy Walker	Entertainment	Soap opera star on All My Children
Frank Zappa	Music, Film	Musician, composer, activist, and filmmaker
