= KOSS =

Radio station in Lancaster, California

- Lancaster, California; United States
- Broadcast area: Antelope Valley
- Frequency: 1380 kHz
- Branding: NewsTalk 1380

Programming
- Format: Talk radio
- Affiliations: ABC News Radio; Radio America

Ownership
- Owner: High Desert Broadcasting; (High Desert Broadcasting LLC)
- Sister stations: KCEL, KGMX, KQAV, KKZQ, KMVE, KUTY

History
- First air date: April 1, 1962
- Former call signs: KBVM (1956–1973); KKZZ (1973–1983); KOTE (1983–1987); KHJJ (1987–2000); KWJL (2000–2007)

Technical information
- Licensing authority: FCC
- Facility ID: 19702
- Class: D
- Power: 1,000 watts (day); 20 watts (night)
- Transmitter coordinates: 34°42′42″N 118°10′33″W

Links
- Public license information: Public file; LMS
- Website: newstalk1380.com

KOSS (1380 AM, "NewsTalk 1380") is a commercial radio station licensed to Lancaster, California, United States, and serves the Antelope Valley area. The station is owned by High Desert Broadcasting and broadcasts a talk format. On the FCC website, this station is listed as "Licensed and Silent".

== History ==
The station signed on as KBVM in August 1956. KBVM changed its call sign to KKZZ in September 1973, then to KOTE in 1983. On January 1, 1987, KOTE changed its call letters to KHJJ, adopting the branding "KHJ 1380" and a talk format.

In 2000, the station became KWJL (K-Jewel 1380) and featured an adult standards format. In 2004, KWJL flipped to Spanish oldies as "Joyas 1380" (joya is the Spanish word for "jewel").

In September 2007, KWJL and KUTY swapped formats, and KWJL became "NewsTalk 1380". The call sign was changed to KOSS in January 2008. The KOSS call letters had previously belonged to another local station, KVVS (105.5 FM), under a previous format.

KOSS was previously the radio home of Lancaster JetHawks minor league baseball, airing play-of-play coverage beginning in the team's 2010 season.
