= KIST-FM =

Radio station in California, United States

Coordinates: 34.503°N 119.850°W

- Carpinteria, California; United States
- Broadcast area: Santa Barbara, California
- Frequency: 107.7 MHz
- Branding: Radio Bronco 107.7

Programming
- Format: Regional Mexican

Ownership
- Owner: Rincon Broadcasting; (Rincon License Subsidiary LLC)
- Sister stations: KOSJ, KSBL, KSPE, KTMS, KTYD

History
- First air date: February 1998
- Former call signs: KLDZ (1997–1998); KLDZ-FM (1998); KIST (1998–2000); KIST-FM (2000–2009); KQIE (2009–2010); KIST-FM (2010); KFYZ (2010)
- Call sign meaning: Derived from former AM counterpart KIST; later used for KISS-FM branding

Technical information
- Licensing authority: FCC
- Facility ID: 31434
- Class: B1
- ERP: 930 watts
- HAAT: 496 meters (1,627 ft)
- Translator: 102.7 K274CJ (Santa Barbara)

Links
- Public license information: Public file; LMS
- Webcast: Listen live
- Website: radiobronco.com

KIST-FM (107.7 MHz) is a commercial radio station that is licensed to Carpinteria, California and broadcasts to the Santa Barbara radio market. The station is owned by Rincon Broadcasting and airs a regional Mexican music format. The KIST-FM studios and offices are on East Cota Street in Santa Barbara. The transmitter is off West Camino Cielo, near other FM and TV towers, in the hills north of Santa Barbara. KIST-FM also uses a 70-watt translator station, K274CJ (102.7 FM) in Santa Barbara.

== History ==
KIST-FM first signed on in February 1998 as KLDZ-FM with an oldies format branded "Cool Oldies 107.7". It launched as a simulcast of AM sister station KLDZ (1340 AM) before the latter flipped formats to sports.

In May 1998, Citicasters, Inc., part of Jacor Communications, purchased KIST and KLDZ-FM for $1.5 million. The AM station changed its call sign to KXXT and the FM outlet assumed the KIST call letters. In May 1999, Jacor merged with Clear Channel Communications, which would own KIST-FM until 2007.

In March 2000, Cumulus Media-owned KKSB (106.3 FM) in Santa Barbara adopted a contemporary hit radio (CHR) format. In response, Clear Channel flipped KIST-FM to top 40 with the branding "KISS 107 FM"; the station featured on-air personality Rick Dees from sister station KIIS-FM in Los Angeles during morning drive. Clear Channel won the head-to-head CHR battle with Cumulus as KKSB flipped to oldies within two years. However, on September 8, 2004, KIST-FM changed to a modern rock format known as "FM 107.7".

On January 11, 2007, Clear Channel Communications sold all of its radio stations in Santa Barbara, including KIST-FM, to Rincon Broadcasting for $17.3 million. Five days later, KIST-FM's format was changed to regional Mexican under the branding of "Radio Bronco".

On December 15, 2009, KIST-FM changed its call letters to KQIE. Two months later, on February 10, 2010, the station reverted to KIST-FM. On July 20, KIST-FM again changed its call letters to KFYZ. That switch was also temporary, as KFYZ restored the KIST-FM call sign on September 10. The KFYZ call letters were transferred to its sister station at 94.5 FM on December 23, 2010 when that station flipped to a top 40 format.
