= Point Broadcasting =

American radio broadcasting company

Point Broadcasting LLC is an American radio broadcasting company based in Ventura, California. The company is the owner of several radio groups in Southern California, doing business as Gold Coast Broadcasting LLC in the Oxnard—Ventura radio market, Rincon Broadcasting LLC in Santa Barbara, and High Desert Broadcasting LLC in the Antelope Valley. As of February 2019, Point owns and operates 21 full-power radio stations, including seven AM stations and 14 on the FM dial.

Point Broadcasting and its subsidiaries are owned by John Hearne and Roy Laughlin.

== History ==
Point Broadcasting acquired its first stations in Ventura County, California in 1994. Doing business as Gold Coast Broadcasting Company, the partnership purchased KELF and KKZZ, both licensed to Camarillo, from Golden Bear Broadcasting for $1.2 million. Two years later, in 1996, Gold Coast purchased KCAQ and KTRO from Greater Pacific Radio Exchange Inc. for $3.65 million. Upon closing on each sale, Point immediately implemented changes in format and staffing at each station. In the case of KCAQ, the company installed KOCP's Dan Garite as program director. Garite positioned KCAQ to compete effectively in its local market by fine-tuning the rhythmic contemporary outlet's musical selection and hiring a multicultural staff.

Point entered the Lancaster—Palmdale, California market in December 1996 with its purchase of KHJJ and KGMX from Eric-Chandler Communications of Antelope Valley Inc. for $1.437 million. This was immediately followed by a $1.375 million acquisition of KUTY and KLKX. The new Antelope Valley cluster took on the name High Desert Broadcasting LLC.

In January 2007, Point expanded into Santa Barbara when Clear Channel Communications sold all of its stations there for $17.3 million. The new cluster began conducting business under the name Rincon Broadcasting LLC.

In 2012, Point Broadcasting unified its individual groups' sales and marketing functions under a single division. Dave Severino was selected as the company's first executive vice president of sales and marketing.

Point Broadcasting owns and operates a network of rhythmic oldies-formatted stations throughout Southern California under the branding "Old School". The first such station was KOCP in Oxnard—Ventura, which flipped to the new format on August 29, 2014. KOCP later moved from the 95.9 FM frequency to 104.7 FM, the same frequency occupied by fellow Old School station KQIE in Riverside—San Bernardino. As of September 2017, "Old School" is carried on five Point stations, with KOCP serving as the originating station.

== Stations ==
Media market	State	Station	Year acquired	Licensee	Ref(s)
Lancaster—Palmdale	California	KCEL	2011	High Desert Broadcasting LLC	
Lancaster—Palmdale	California	KGMX	1996	High Desert Broadcasting LLC	
Lancaster—Palmdale	California	KKZQ	1999	High Desert Broadcasting LLC	
Lancaster—Palmdale	California	KMVE	2003	High Desert Broadcasting LLC	
Lancaster—Palmdale	California	KOSS	1996	High Desert Broadcasting LLC	
Lancaster—Palmdale	California	KQAV	1997	High Desert Broadcasting LLC	
Lancaster—Palmdale	California	KUTY	1997	High Desert Broadcasting LLC	
Oxnard—Ventura	California	KCAQ	1994	Gold Coast Broadcasting LLC	
Oxnard—Ventura	California	KFYV	1996	Gold Coast Broadcasting LLC	
Oxnard—Ventura	California	KOCP	1996	Gold Coast Broadcasting LLC	
Oxnard—Ventura	California	KUNX	1994	Gold Coast Broadcasting LLC	
Oxnard—Ventura	California	KVEN	1996	Gold Coast Broadcasting LLC	
Oxnard—Ventura	California	KVTA	1996	Gold Coast Broadcasting LLC	
Riverside—San Bernardino	California	KQIE	2010	LC Media LP	
Santa Barbara	California	KIST-FM	2007	Rincon Broadcasting LLC	
Santa Barbara	California	KOSJ	2007	Rincon Broadcasting LLC	
Santa Barbara	California	KSBL	2007	Rincon Broadcasting LLC	
Santa Barbara	California	KSPE	2007	Rincon Broadcasting LLC	
Santa Barbara	California	KTMS	2007	Rincon Broadcasting LLC	
Santa Barbara	California	KTYD	2007	Rincon Broadcasting LLC	
Santa Maria—Lompoc	California	KXFM	2016	Point Ten LLC	
