= KSPE =

Radio station in Ellwood, California

- Ellwood, California; United States
- Broadcast area: Santa Barbara County, California
- Frequency: 94.5 MHz
- Branding: "La Musical 94.5 FM"

Programming
- Format: Classic regional Mexican

Ownership
- Owner: Rincon Broadcasting; (Rincon License Subsidiary LLC)
- Sister stations: KIST-FM, KOSJ, KSBL, KTMS, KTYD

History
- First air date: February 6, 1989 (as KCQR)
- Former call signs: KCQR (1989–1995); KSPE-FM (1995–2010); KIST-FM (2010); KFYZ (2010–2017)

Technical information
- Licensing authority: FCC
- Facility ID: 61058
- Class: B
- ERP: 810 watts 880 watts with beam tilt
- HAAT: 899 meters (2,949 ft)
- Transmitter coordinates: 34.526°N 119.959°W

Links
- Public license information: Public file; LMS
- Webcast: Listen Live

KSPE (94.5 FM, "La Musical 94.5 FM") is a commercial radio station that is licensed to Ellwood, California, a district of Goleta in Santa Barbara County. It is owned by Rincon Broadcasting and broadcasts a classic regional Mexican music format. The KSPE studios and offices are on East Cota Street in Santa Barbara and the transmitter is located on West Camino Cielo in the Los Padres National Forest. While the station's effective radiated power is only 810 watts, the tower is 2,949 feet (899 m) in height above average terrain, making KSPE a Class B FM station covering the Santa Barbara radio market and parts of Oxnard—Ventura.

== History ==
The station first signed on on April 6, 1989 as KCQR, an album-oriented rock station calling itself "94 Rock". It was owned by South West Broadcasting, Inc. In 1994, the station was sold to Spectacular Broadcasting, Inc. for $1.2 million. The following year, KCQR changed its call sign to KSPE-FM to match that of co-owned station KSPE (1490 AM) in Santa Barbara and began simulcasting the AM's regional Mexican music format, with both stations branded "La Musical".

In October 1998, Spectacular sold KSPE-FM and its AM counterpart to Jacor Communications (later Clear Channel Communications) for $4.6 million. The AM station switched its call letters to KBKO, while KSPE-FM was separately programmed as "La Preciosa", playing regional Mexican oldies.

On January 11, 2007, Clear Channel sold all of its radio stations in Santa Barbara, including KSPE-FM, to Rincon Broadcasting for $17.3 million.

KSPE-FM changed call letters in 2010, first to KIST-FM on July 19, then to KFYZ on September 10. The Spanish oldies format remained until December 21, 2010, when the station flipped to top 40 with the branding "Z94.5".

In September 2017, the station reverted to its previous classic regional Mexican format, this time with the call letters KSPE and branded as "La Musical".
