= KTMS =

News/talk radio station in Santa Barbara, California

Coordinates: 34°28′15″N 119°40′36.5″W

- Santa Barbara, California; United States
- Frequency: 990 kHz
- Branding: Fox Sports 990/97.9

Programming
- Format: Sports
- Network: Fox Sports Radio

Ownership
- Owner: Rincon Broadcasting; (Rincon License Subsidiary LLC)
- Sister stations: KIST-FM, KOSJ, KSBL, KSPE, KTYD

History
- First air date: October 31, 1937; 89 years ago (on 1220 AM)
- Former call signs: 990 kHz; KFMC (CP); KGUD (1963–1973); KTYD (1973–1978); KBLS (1978–1992); KKSM (February 24–September 2, 1992); KKJZ (September 2–November 27, 1992); KQSB (November 27, 1992–1998)
- Former frequencies: 1220 kHz (1937–1941); 1250 kHz (1941–1998)
- Call sign meaning: Thomas More Storke (founder)

Technical information
- Licensing authority: FCC
- Facility ID: 14529
- Class: B
- Power: 5,000 watts day 500 watts night
- Translator: 97.9 K250BS (Solimar Beach); 97.3 K247CN (Mojave)

Links
- Public license information: Public file; LMS
- Website: ktms.com

KTMS (990 AM, "Fox Sports 990/97.9") is a commercial radio station in Santa Barbara, California. It is owned by Rincon Broadcasting and airs a sports radio format. The studios are on East Cota Street in Santa Barbara.

By day, KTMS is powered at 5,000 watts. But to protect other stations on 990 AM, a clear channel frequency, KTMS reduces power at night to 500 watts. The AM transmitter site overlooks Santa Barbara from near Rattlesnake Canyon Park, along Gibraltar Road, and above Gibraltar Peak, home of most Santa Barbara FM stations. The site is unusual, since AM stations are usually sited in low-lying areas, ideally with the highest possible high ground conductivity. This site is sufficiently close to the population center for even the low night power to serve the whole city. KTMS is simulcast on FM translator station K250BS at 97.9 MHz, licensed to Solimar Beach, and K247CN at 97.3 MHz in Mojave.

== Previous Talk Programming ==
KTMS previously carried nationally syndicated conservative talk shows. Weekdays begin with Brian Kilmeade and Friends. That's followed by The Clay Travis and Buck Sexton Show, The Sean Hannity Show, The Chad Benson Show, The Charlie Kirk Show, Our American Stories with Lee Habeeb, Coast to Coast AM with George Noory and America in the Morning with John Trout.

Weekends featured shows on health, money, home repair, pets, technology, food and beer, including some paid programming. Syndicated weekend programs include Rich DeMuro on Tech, The Kim Komando Show, At Home with Gary Sullivan and Sunday Nights with Bill Cunningham. Most hours begin with an update from Fox News Radio.

== History of KTMS ==
On October 31, 1937, KTMS first signed on the air on 1220 AM, with 500 watts. It was founded by Santa Barbara News-Press publisher Thomas More Storke (hence the station call sign). KTMS was an NBC Blue Network affiliate, carrying its schedule of dramas, comedies, news, sports, game shows, soap operas, and big band broadcasts during the "Golden Age of Radio". Among the programs produced at the station was 1-2-5 Club, which debuted in 1937 and was hosted by disc jockey Bob Ruth for many years.

In 1941, KTMS moved to the 1250 AM frequency, where it would stay for 57 years. The move was coupled with a power increase to 1,000 watts. When the Blue Network became ABC in 1945, KTMS maintained its affiliation, while also carrying shows from the Mutual Broadcasting System and the Don Lee Network.

In 1965, KTMS acquired an FM radio station, KRCW (97.5), and renamed it KTMS-FM. At first, it mostly simulcast programs heard on 1250 AM but later became separately programmed with a beautiful music format. In 1985, it switched its call letters to KHTY and flipped to top 40.

In January 1996, Engles Enterprises, Inc. purchased KTMS and KHTY for $2 million. Nearly three years later, in September 1998, the 1250 AM frequency on which KTMS aired was sold for $1.6 million to Smith Broadcasting Group, Inc., owner of the local ABC television affiliate KEYT-TV (channel 3). Smith immediately launched a competing news-only format on 1250 with new call letters KEYT to match its TV sister station. Meanwhile, the KTMS call sign and news/talk format moved to 990 AM.

In 1997, KTMS was purchased by Clear Channel Communications. In January 2007, Clear Channel sold its six Santa Barbara stations, including KTMS, to Rincon Broadcasting LLC for $17.3 million. Rincon, a subsidiary of Ventura-based Point Broadcasting, officially took control of the cluster on January 16.

On April 10, 2025, KTMS changed their format from news/talk to sports, branded as "Fox Sports 990/97.9".

== History of the 990 AM frequency in Santa Barbara ==
The original station on 990 AM signed on August 6, 1963 as KGUD (K-Good Radio) and sported a country music format. In 1967, radio and television personality Dick Clark purchased the station and its FM counterpart (now KTYD). In September 1971, Clark sold KGUD-AM-FM to a group led by Harold S. Greenberg for $310,000.

KGUD adopted the KTYD call letters in 1973. It began simulcasting the album-oriented rock format of its FM counterpart, then known as KTYD-FM. But it briefly returned to country the following decade. Before becoming KTMS in 1998, KGUD attempted a number of formats, including religious programming, Broadway show tunes, and jazz, but none was successful.

== Previous logo ==
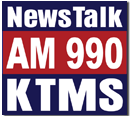

== General references ==
- Sies, Luther F. Encyclopedia of American Radio 1920-1960. Jefferson, NC: McFarland, 2000. ISBN 0-7864-0452-3
