= KUTY =

- Palmdale, California; United States
- Broadcast area: Antelope Valley
- Frequency: 1470 kHz
- Branding: Hermosa 1470

Programming
- Format: Regional Mexican

Ownership
- Owner: High Desert Broadcasting; (High Desert Broadcasting LLC)
- Sister stations: KCEL, KGMX, KKZQ, KMVE, KOSS, KQAV

History
- First air date: 1957

Technical information
- Licensing authority: FCC
- Facility ID: 22011
- Class: B
- Power: 5,000 watts
- Transmitter coordinates: 34°39′55″N 118°00′40″W
- Translators: 96.9 K245CL (Lancaster); 99.7 K259BD (Rosamond)

Links
- Public license information: Public file; LMS
- Website: highdesertbroadcasting.com

KUTY (1470 AM, "Hermosa 1470") is a commercial radio station licensed to Palmdale, California, United States and serves the Antelope Valley area. The station is owned by High Desert Broadcasting LLC and broadcasts a regional Mexican format.

== History ==
KUTY signed on in 1957 as a top 40 station with the branding "Radio 147" — the only top 40 station audible in the Antelope Valley. In the 1970s, KUTY flipped to a country music format known as "Cutie Country".

With the advent of competing country outlet KTPI on the FM dial in the mid-1980s, the station began to lose market share. However, station management saw a new opportunity with the area's growing Latino population. On April 7, 1993, KUTY became the Antelope Valley's first Spanish-language station when it flipped to regional Mexican music with the branding "Fiesta Latina".

High Desert Broadcasting purchased KUTY in the 1990s. In 1997, the station flipped to Spanish talk as part of the Radio Unica network, later changing to the Radio Lazer network. In 2004, Radio Lazer was moved to High Desert Broadcasting's newly acquired station KCEL; KUTY switched to an English talk format as "NewsTalk 1470" under guidance by Ray Cuneff.

In September 2007, KUTY and KWJL swapped formats. Local programming on NewsTalk 1470 was discontinued with the move to 1380 AM. Meanwhile, the regional Mexican format on Joyas 1380 relocated to KUTY as "La Mera Mera 1470".

During the 2010s, KUTY adjusted its format to a Mexican adult contemporary emphasis; the station was rebranded "Hermosa 1470".

== Notable personalities ==
Several prominent disc jockeys began their careers at KUTY, particularly during the station's top 40 era. These personalities include:

- Pat Garrett
- Bob Kingsley
- Don Imus
- Rog Martin
- Gary Marshall
- Albert "Stone-Cold Al" Nelson
- Billy Pearl
- Bob Shannon
