= James Richards (Canadian football) =

American gridiron football player (born 1969)

Profile
- Position: Guard

Personal information
- Born: November 7, 1969 (age 56); Lancaster, California, U.S.
- Listed height: 6 ft 5 in (1.96 m)
- Listed weight: 290 lb (132 kg)

Career information
- High school: Antelope Valley (CA)
- College: California
- NFL draft: 1991: 3rd round, 64th overall pick

Career history
- Dallas Cowboys (1991)*; Los Angeles Rams (1991)*; Dallas Cowboys (1991)*; Phoenix Cardinals (1992)*; Dallas Cowboys (1993)*; Las Vegas Posse (1994)
- * Offseason or practice squad member only

Awards and highlights
- Second-team All-Pac-10 (1990)

James G. Richards (born November 7, 1969) is an American former professional football offensive guard in the National Football League (NFL) for the Dallas Cowboys, Los Angeles Rams and Phoenix Cardinals. He also was a member of the Las Vegas Posse in the Canadian Football League (CFL). He was selected by the Dallas Cowboys in the third round of the 1991 NFL draft. He played college football at the University of California, Berkeley.

== Early life ==
Richards attended Antelope Valley High School, where he was an All-state offensive tackle as a senior. In 1987, he accepted a football scholarship from Cal State Northridge, where he played as an offensive tackle. In 1988, he transferred to Antelope Valley College.

As a junior in 1989, he transferred to the University of California. He was named the starter at left guard, protecting quarterback Troy Taylor, who set a Cal record for total offense and passed for the second most yards in a single-season in school history.

As a senior in 1990, he started all 12 games at left guard and was also the long snapper for punts in the first four contests. He contributed to Russell White and Anthony Wallace becoming the first pair of running backs in school history to gain 1,000 rushing yards in the same year. They also became the fourth and fifth players in Cal history to rush for 1,000 yards in a single-season. Richards only missed 10 offensive snaps in his last two seasons.

== Professional career ==
=== Dallas Cowboys (first stint) ===
Richards was selected by the Dallas Cowboys in the third round (64th overall) of the 1991 NFL draft. He struggled with his blocking during training camp and was waived on August 26. In September, he was signed to the practice squad, until being released on October 9.

=== Los Angeles Rams ===
On October 16, 1991, he was signed to the Los Angeles Rams practice squad. He was released on November 6.

=== Phoenix Cardinals ===
On February 4, 1992, he signed as a free agent with the Phoenix Cardinals. He was released on September 1. On November 2, he was signed to the practice squad. He was waived on November 10.

=== Dallas Cowboys (second stint) ===
On April 13, 1993, he signed with the Dallas Cowboys. He was released before the season started.

=== Las Vegas Posse ===
In July 1994, Richards was signed by the expansion team Las Vegas Posse of the Canadian Football League. He was injured and appeared in only 3 games. He played as an offensive tackle, before the team folded at the end of the season.
