= KGMX =

Radio station in Lancaster, California

- Lancaster, California; United States
- Broadcast area: Antelope Valley
- Frequency: 106.3 MHz
- Branding: K-Mix 106.3

Programming
- Format: Contemporary hit radio

Ownership
- Owner: High Desert Broadcasting; (High Desert Broadcasting LLC)
- Sister stations: KCEL, KKZQ, KMVE, KOSS, KQAV, KUTY

History
- First air date: October 28, 1970
- Former call signs: KOTE (1970–1983); KKZZ-FM (1983–1990); KGMX (1990–2010); KQAV (2010)

Technical information
- Licensing authority: FCC
- Facility ID: 19703
- Class: A
- ERP: 3,000 watts
- HAAT: 41 meters (135 ft)
- Transmitter coordinates: 34°44′41″N 118°7′30″W
- Repeater: 106.9 KMVE (California City)

Links
- Public license information: Public file; LMS
- Webcast: Listen live
- Website: kmix1063.com

KGMX (106.3 FM, "K-Mix 106.3") is a commercial radio station licensed to Lancaster, California, United States, and serves the Antelope Valley area. The station is owned by High Desert Broadcasting and broadcasts a contemporary hit radio format, simulcast on KMVE (106.9 FM) in California City, California.

== History ==
The station first signed on October 28, 1970 as KOTE. Originally owned by Albert Medlinsky, it broadcast a middle of the road music format. On May 24, 1983, KOTE changed its call sign to KKZZ-FM. The station changed its call letters to KGMX on February 14, 1990 to accompany its new adult contemporary format, branded "K-Mix".

In December 1996, Eric-Chandler Communications of Antelope Valley Inc. sold KGMX and sister station KHJJ (1380 AM) to High Desert Broadcasting for $1,437,500. By 2007, KGMX was broadcasting a hot adult contemporary format.

On July 19, 2010, the station adopted the KQAV call letters. Ten days later, on July 29, the station swapped call signs with its sister station on 93.5 FM, reverting to KGMX.

== Awards and nominations ==
KGMX was nominated for a Crystal Radio Award in 1994 for its community service efforts.

Year	Awards	Category	Recipient	Result	Source
1994	NAB Crystal Radio Awards			Nominated	
