= KCEL =

- Mojave, California; United States
- Broadcast area: Antelope Valley
- Frequency: 96.1 MHz
- Branding: Que Buena 96.1

Programming
- Format: Regional Mexican

Ownership
- Owner: High Desert Broadcasting; (Coloma Mojave LLC)
- Sister stations: KGMX, KQAV, KKZQ, KMVE, KOSS, KUTY

History
- Former call signs: KMVE (2006–2009)

Technical information
- Licensing authority: FCC
- Facility ID: 164156
- Class: A
- ERP: 630 watts
- HAAT: 251 meters (823 feet)
- Transmitter coordinates: 35°05′38″N 118°16′00″W

Links
- Public license information: Public file; LMS
- Webcast: Listen Live
- Website: laquebuena961.com

KCEL (96.1 FM, "Que Buena 96.1") is a commercial radio station that is licensed to Mojave, California, United States and serves the Antelope Valley area. The station is owned by High Desert Broadcasting LLC and broadcasts a regional Mexican format.

== History ==
The station on 96.1 FM first signed on as KMVE.

In June 2008, High Desert Broadcasting began programming KMVE under a local marketing agreement with Coloma Mojave.

On January 1, 2009, High Desert Broadcasting swapped the frequencies of KMVE and sister station KCEL (106.9 FM). With the move, 96.1 FM assumed the KCEL call letters and began airing a regional Mexican format branded as "Radio Lazer 96.1". Later, the station rebranded as "Que Buena 96.1 FM".

In June 2011, Ventura, California-based Point Broadcasting, owner of High Desert Broadcasting, purchased Coloma Mojave LLC, licensee of KCEL.
