= KQAV =

- Rosamond, California; United States
- Broadcast area: Antelope Valley, California
- Frequency: 93.5 MHz
- Branding: Old School 93.5

Programming
- Format: Rhythmic oldies

Ownership
- Owner: High Desert Broadcasting; (High Desert Broadcasting LLC)
- Sister stations: KCEL, KGMX, KKZQ, KMVE, KOCP, KOSJ, KOSS, KQIE, KUTY, KWIE, KXFM, KZLA

History
- First air date: September 1, 1993
- Former call signs: KPXD (1992–1993, CP); KLKX (1993–2010); KGMX (2010)
- Call sign meaning: Quake Valley (former classic rock format)

Technical information
- Licensing authority: FCC
- Facility ID: 70879
- Class: A
- ERP: 3,000 watts
- HAAT: 63 meters (207 ft)
- Transmitter coordinates: 34°52′27″N 118°16′24″W

Links
- Public license information: Public file; LMS
- Webcast: Listen live
- Website: oldschool935.com

KQAV (93.5 FM, "Old School 93.5") is a radio station licensed to Rosamond, California, United States, and serves the Antelope Valley area. The station is owned by High Desert Broadcasting and broadcasts a rhythmic oldies format.

== History ==
The station originated in a Federal Communications Commission (FCC) construction permit granted in 1992 to KPXD at 93.5 FM, owned by Waremar Communications Inc. and licensed to Rosamond, California. When KPXD finally signed on September 1, 1993, it adopted the KLKX call letters and a classic rock format. In January 1997, Paul Dale Ware sold KLKX and AM sister station KUTY to Point Broadcasting for $1.375 million.

On February 1, 2006, former WLUP-FM (Chicago) on-air personality Mark Zander joined KLKX, branded "93.5 The Quake", as programming director. Zander also produced and hosted The Rockin' '80s, a nationally syndicated rock retrospective program that was distributed by Envision Radio Networks. In August 2007, he assumed the same role for sister modern rock station KKZQ (100.1 The Edge). Zander resigned from High Desert Broadcasting on June 13, 2008, to manage his own radio content production company.

On July 19, 2010, KLKX picked up the KGMX call letters from its sister station on 106.3 FM. Ten days later, on July 29, the two stations swapped call signs, with 93.5 FM becoming KQAV.

On March 9, 2015, High Desert merged the classic rock format of KQAV with the active rock programming of KKZQ into a new mainstream rock station, branded "100.1 The Quake". KQAV simulcast KKZQ for five days, then stunted that weekend with a looped message directing listeners to the latter station at 100.1 FM. KQAV morning show host Gary Crewes moved to middays on the new KKZQ, while The Edge's Mitchell retained his morning drive timeslot. On March 16 at 10:00 a.m., KQAV ended stunting and flipped to rhythmic oldies as "Old School 93.5". The Antelope Valley station is Point Broadcasting's third "Old School" outlet, following KOCP in Oxnard and KQIE in Redlands; KQAV is a partial simulcast of KOCP.
