= KOSJ =

- Santa Barbara, California; United States
- Broadcast area: Santa Barbara, California
- Frequency: 1490 kHz
- Branding: Old School 94.1 & 1490 AM

Programming
- Language: English
- Format: Rhythmic oldies

Ownership
- Owner: Rincon Broadcasting; (Rincon Broadcasting License Subsidiary, LLC)
- Sister stations: KIST-FM, KOCP, KQAV, KQIE, KSBL, KSPE, KTMS, KTYD, KWIE, KXFM, KZLA

History
- First air date: April 1926
- Former call signs: KFCR (1926–1929); KDB (1929–1990); KSPE (1990–1997, 2010–2017); KBKO (1997–2008); KIST (2008–2010)
- Former frequencies: 720 kHz (1926–1927); 1420 kHz (1927–1929); 1500 kHz (1929–1941)
- Call sign meaning: "Old School Jammin'"

Technical information
- Licensing authority: FCC
- Facility ID: 61712
- Class: C
- Power: 1,000 watts (day); 940 watts (night)
- Transmitter coordinates: 34°25′8″N 119°41′13.5″W
- Translator: 94.1 K231CR (Santa Barbara)

Links
- Public license information: Public file; LMS
- Webcast: Listen live
- Website: oldschool1490.com

KOSJ (1490 AM) is a commercial radio station licensed to Santa Barbara, California, United States, and serves the Santa Barbara area. The station is owned by Rincon Broadcasting and broadcasts a rhythmic oldies format branded "Old School 94.1 and 1490 AM". KOSJ is rebroadcast on FM translator K231CR in Santa Barbara on 94.1 MHz.

== History ==
=== Early years ===
The station launched on the 720 kHz frequency as KFCR in April 1926; it moved to 1420 kHz the following year.

KFCR was purchased in 1929 by George Barnes, owner of KGB in San Diego. Barnes changed the call letters to KDB in tribute to his wife, Dorothy Barnes, and moved the station to 1500 kHz. In October of that year, KDB's license was canceled for failure to comply with regulations from the Federal Radio Commission (forerunner to the Federal Communications Commission or FCC). At issue were broadcasts featuring The Crusaders, an organization that promoted the repeal of Prohibition. The station's management fought vigorously to get the license back, and KDB returned to the air by the end of the year.

Over the next couple of decades, KDB was bought and sold several times. In 1931, it became part of the Don Lee Network by virtue of being sold to Lee under the corporate name Santa Barbara Broadcasters. KDB relocated to the 1490 kHz frequency in 1941.

In 1969, Len Menard, doing business as KDB Broadcasting Company, attempted to sell KDB and its FM counterpart to music publisher Hugh Heller in two separate transactions. The AM outlet was slated to sell for $500,000 on April 30, while KDB-FM was to yield $100,000 in a deal reached August 5. However, the FCC did not approve the transfer of either license to Heller. On November 27, 1970, Menard sold KDB-AM-FM to Pacific Broadcasting Company, owned by Richard E. Marsh, for $400,000; this deal was approved by the FCC.

On September 1, 1990, KDB changed its call letters to KSPE. Two months later, in a reorganization effort, Pacific Broadcasting sold KSPE to Spectacular Broadcasting for $302,000. Around the same time, the station began airing a regional Mexican music format. The station's call sign changed once again on January 20, 1997 to KBKO to reflect its new branding, "Radio Bronco"; the format remained the same.

In October 1998, Spectacular sold KBKO and its sister station, then known as KSPE-FM, to Jacor Communications for $4.6 million; Jacor merged with Clear Channel Communications the following year.

=== Rincon era (2007–present) ===
On January 11, 2007, Clear Channel Communications sold all of its radio stations in Santa Barbara, including KBKO, to Rincon Broadcasting for $17.3 million. Rincon switched KBKO's format from regional Mexican to progressive talk. On October 28, 2008, KBKO changed its call sign to KIST.

On July 19, 2010, KIST adopted the call letters KSPE, a change that preceded a flip on September 15 to a Spanish-language adult hits format with the branding "La Preciosa". In July 2017, KSPE adjusted its format to Spanish adult contemporary and adopted the branding "La Musical".

On September 14, 2017, La Musical moved to KFYZ (94.5 FM); KSPE stunted with a looped announcement in Spanish notifying listeners to tune in at the new frequency. The next day, the stunt ended and KSPE introduced a rhythmic oldies format with new callsign KOSJ.

In December 2021, KOSJ's 198-foot red-and-white transmitting tower, which it shares with KCLU and KZSB, and had long been slightly bent, was shortened to 128 feet and topped with four 12-foot "whiskers" in a horizontal X shape, to give the tower extra electrical length. The tower, which is owned by Rincon Broadcasting, was also painted dark green to better blend with its surroundings. Changes in the radiation properties of the shortened tower required a reduction in night power from 1000 to 940 watts.

As of August 2025, KOSJ brands itself as Old School 99.1 Santa Maria & 94.1 Santa Barbara.
