= KTWD =

- Wallace, Idaho; United States
- Frequency: 103.5 MHz

Programming
- Format: Christian radio (KRTM simulcast)

Ownership
- Owner: Penfold Communications

History
- First air date: 2001 (at 97.5)
- Former call signs: KQWK (1997–2001, CP)
- Former frequencies: 97.5 MHz (2001–2015)

Technical information
- Licensing authority: FCC
- Facility ID: 82985
- Class: C2
- ERP: 1,600 watts
- HAAT: 675 meters
- Transmitter coordinates: 47°33′49″N 115°50′1″W

Links
- Public license information: Public file; LMS
- Webcast: Listen Live
- Website: krtmradio.org

KTWD (103.5 FM) is a radio station licensed to Wallace, Idaho, United States. The station is currently owned by Penfold Communications.

== History ==
The station was assigned the call sign KQWK on 1997-03-31. On 2001-02-05, the station changed its call sign to the current KTWD.

On July 7, 2015, KTWD moved from 97.5 FM to 103.5 FM and returned to the air on July 8 with a simulcast of KRTM's Christian radio format. The station was licensed by the Federal Communications Commission to operate on 103.5 FM on August 3, 2015.
