= Solimar Beach =

Beach in California, United States

Coordinates: 34°18′13″N 119°20′54″W

Solimar Beach is within western Ventura city, in Ventura County, California. It is a small Southern California beach and one of the few that still allows dogs on a leash.

== Location ==
Solimar Beach is located approximately one mile north of Emma Wood State Beach.

Solimar beach is the stretch of sand and ocean that lines the ocean front housing and extends southeast towards the city of Ventura. The southern portion of the beach is considered the "public beach" because the sand is accessible and there are no houses. To the north are two separate private gated residential communities. Solimar Beach Colony, the first of the two communities, is the first beach community north of the city of Ventura along the Pacific Coast Highway. Most of the time the tide is too high to completely walk the full stretch of the beach. Professional surfer and winner of MTV's Surf Girls, Mary Osbourne, is from Solimar.

"Soli" breaks well with a 3'+ southerly swell — conditions varying on the shape of the sandbar.
