= KKRS =

- Davenport, Washington; United States
- Broadcast area: Spokane metropolitan area
- Frequency: 97.3 MHz
- Branding: KRTM Radio

Programming
- Format: Christian radio

Ownership
- Owner: Penfold Communications

History
- First air date: October 16, 1998

Technical information
- Licensing authority: FCC
- Facility ID: 78008
- Class: C3
- ERP: 5,100 watts
- HAAT: 220 meters (720 ft)
- Transmitter coordinates: 47°35′14″N 117°53′26″W
- Translator: 93.3 K227CD (Spokane)

Links
- Public license information: Public file; LMS
- Webcast: Listen live
- Website: KRTMradio.com

KKRS (97.3 FM) is a non-commercial radio station licensed to Davenport, Washington, United States, and serving the Spokane metropolitan area. Owned by Penfold Communications, it features a Christian radio format. Most programming is simulcast with co-owned KRTM in Banning, California.

KKRS has an effective radiated power (ERP) of 5,100 watts as a Class C3 station. The transmitter is off Washington State Route 231 near Fry Road in Edwall. Programming is also heard on 99-watt FM translator K227CD at 93.3 MHz in Spokane.

== History ==
The station signed on the air on October 16, 1998. KKRS has always been a Christian station. It was originally owned by CSN International. Its studios were on Sunset Road in Airway Heights.
