= KKZQ =

- Tehachapi, California; United States
- Broadcast area: Antelope Valley
- Frequency: 100.1 MHz
- Branding: 100.1 The Quake

Programming
- Format: Classic rock

Ownership
- Owner: High Desert Broadcasting; (High Desert Broadcasting LLC)
- Sister stations: KCEL, KGMX, KQAV, KMVE, KOSS, KUTY

History
- First air date: 2001; 25 years ago

Technical information
- Licensing authority: FCC
- Facility ID: 85024
- Class: A
- ERP: 340 watts
- HAAT: 189 meters (620 ft)
- Transmitter coordinates: 35.075°N 118.370°W

Links
- Public license information: Public file; LMS
- Webcast: Listen live
- Website: KKZQ Online

KKZQ (100.1 FM, "100.1 The Quake") is a commercial radio station that is licensed to Tehachapi, California, United States and serves the Antelope Valley area. The station is owned by High Desert Broadcasting and broadcasts a classic rock format. KKZQ leases space on KSRY's transmission tower.

== History ==
KKZQ signed on in 2001 with a rhythmic oldies format branded "Mojo 100.1 FM". In 2002, the station flipped to soft adult contemporary as "The Breeze 100.1", formatted very similarly to KOST (103.5 FM), a Los Angeles-based station that could be received in the Antelope Valley. In 2003, KKZQ flipped to modern rock with the branding "The Edge 100.1". That format succeeded because there were no other modern rock-formatted stations audible in the Antelope Valley.

In August 2007, former WLUP-FM (Chicago) on-air personality Mark Zander joined KKZQ as programming director, adding to his existing duties in the same role with sister station KLKZ. Zander resigned from High Desert Broadcasting on June 13, 2008 to manage his own radio content production company.

Other notable talent included former KNX personality Jeff Duran, who took over as programming director in addition to his daily airshift. Duran's interviews with Donald Trump, Lady Gaga and Shuggie Otis went viral and briefly increased KKZQ presence beyond its limited frequency.

Previous logo

On March 9, 2015, High Desert Broadcasting merged the active rock programming of KKZQ with the classic rock format of KQAV into a new mainstream rock station, branded "100.1 The Quake". KQAV simulcast KKZQ for five days, then stunted that weekend with a looped message directing listeners to the latter station at 100.1 FM; on March 16, the 93.5 FM frequency flipped to rhythmic oldies. KQAV morning show host Gary Crewes moved to middays on the new KKZQ, while The Edge's Mitchell retained his morning drive timeslot. In October 2017, KKZQ adjusted its format to classic rock, dropping the newer music that it was playing but keeping the Quake branding.
