= KMVE =

- California City, California; United States
- Broadcast area: Antelope Valley
- Frequency: 106.9 MHz
- Branding: Country 106.9, The AV's Best Country

Programming
- Format: Country

Ownership
- Owner: High Desert Broadcasting; (High Desert Broadcasting LLC)
- Sister stations: KCEL, KGMX, KKZQ, KOSS, KQAV, KUTY

History
- First air date: May 22, 1999; 27 years ago (as KCEL)
- Former call signs: KCEL (1997–2009)

Technical information
- Licensing authority: FCC
- Facility ID: 33526
- Class: A
- ERP: 2,350 watts
- HAAT: 159 meters (522 ft)
- Transmitter coordinates: 35°12′44″N 117°45′11″W

Links
- Public license information: Public file; LMS
- Webcast: Listen Live
- Website: country1069.com

KMVE (106.9 FM) is a commercial radio station that is licensed to California City, California, United States and serves the Antelope Valley area. The station is owned by High Desert Broadcasting and broadcasts a country music format.

== History ==
The station first signed on May 22, 1999 as KCEL (106.9 K-Cell). Owned by Kathryn J. Efford, it aired a variety format focusing on jazz, country music, and oldies. KCEL hosted many local specialty shows from its studios in California City, including one on Wednesday evenings that showcased rock music.

In September 2003, KCEL switched to a full-time oldies format. This lasted until the following month, when Efford sold the station to High Desert Broadcasting for $500,000. The new owner then flipped KCEL to a regional Mexican format.

On January 1, 2009, KCEL swapped frequencies with sister station KMVE on 96.1 FM. With the move, 106.9 FM assumed the KMVE call letters and began airing a classic hits format now branded as "Classic Top 40 106.9".

In 2011, High Desert Broadcasting assigned KMVE to Mojave Radio LLC, owned by Keith Yokomoto, for $100. The station retained the classic hits format.

In June 2019, KMVE dropped classic hits and began simulcasting sister station KGMX (106.3 FM) and its top 40 format.
