= WKJA =

Christian radio station in Brunswick, Ohio

- Brunswick, Ohio; United States
- Broadcast area: Akron metropolitan area
- Frequency: 91.9 MHz
- Branding: Heartfelt Radio

Programming
- Format: Christian Radio

Ownership
- Owner: Christian Healthcare Ministries, Inc.

History
- First air date: April 4, 2008

Technical information
- Licensing authority: FCC
- Facility ID: 122205
- Class: B1
- ERP: 24,000 watts
- HAAT: 97 meters (318 ft)
- Transmitter coordinates: 40°54′56″N 81°55′56″W

Links
- Public license information: Public file; LMS
- Website: heartfeltradio.org

WKJA is a Christian radio station licensed to Brunswick, Ohio, broadcasting on 91.9 FM. WKJA is owned by Christian Healthcare Ministries, Inc.
