= KWTD =

Satellite of KWTW, Bishop
- Ridgecrest, California; United States
- Broadcast area: Antelope Valley
- Frequency: 91.9 MHz
- Branding: Living Proof Radio Network

Programming
- Format: Christian radio

Ownership
- Owner: Westside Christian Fellowship A.V.
- Sister stations: KWTW

History
- First air date: May 2005
- Call sign meaning: K Winning The Desert

Technical information
- Licensing authority: FCC
- Facility ID: 86917
- Class: B
- ERP: 7,000 watts
- HAAT: 390.3 meters (1,281 ft)
- Transmitter coordinates: 35°28′38″N 117°41′58″W
- Translator: 105.9 K290AO (Tonopah, Nevada)

Links
- Public license information: Public file; LMS

KWTD (91.9 FM) is a non-commercial radio station that is licensed to Ridgecrest, California, United States and serves Ridgecrest, California City, and the Antelope Valley. The station is owned by Westside Christian Fellowship A.V. and broadcasts a Christian radio format consisting of Christian talk and teaching and contemporary Christian music, simulcasting KWTW in Bishop, California. KWTD transmits from El Paso Peak, south of Ridgecrest.

KWTD first signed on in May 2005.
