= KWTW =

- Bishop, California; United States
- Frequency: 88.5 MHz
- Branding: Living Proof Radio Network

Programming
- Format: Christian Contemporary & Christian Talk
- Affiliations: Calvary Chapel of Bishop, California

Ownership
- Owner: Westside Christian Fellowship A.V.
- Sister stations: KWTD

History
- First air date: 2002-02-11
- Call sign meaning: K Winning The West

Technical information
- Licensing authority: FCC
- Facility ID: 86741
- Class: B
- ERP: 900 watts
- HAAT: 889 meters (2,917 ft)
- Transmitter coordinates: 37.413°N 118.186°W
- Repeater: See § Transmitter network

Links
- Public license information: Public file; LMS

KWTW (88.5 FM) is a radio station broadcasting a Christian Contemporary & Talk format, licensed to Bishop, California, United States. KWTW is known as The Living Proof Radio Network, which is a ministry of Calvary Chapel in Bishop. The station is currently owned by Westside Christian Fellowship A.V. The Living Proof Radio Network, in addition to KWTW 88.5 Bishop, is also broadcast on KWTD 91.9 FM in Ridgecrest, California.
