= Thom Beck =

American radio personality

"The 'Pop Chronicles' Team at KRLA, c.1970". From left to right are John Gilliland, unidentified, Sie Holliday, Chester Coleman, and Thom Beck. Courtesy of The John Gilliland Collection.

Thom Beck (died October 15, 1986) was a founding member of The Credibility Gap while at KRLA 1110 radio, where he also narrated part of the Pop Chronicles. He was kept on as a journalist at KRLA 1110 when Lew Irwin was brought in create the new news program that became the Credibility Gap. He worked as a reporter at KCBS in San Francisco and as a disc jockey at KIIS, 1970-1972 in between stints at KRLA, which he left in 1976. He is deceased.

== Discography ==
- 1968 - An Album Of Political Pornography, with Lew Irwin and the Credibility Gap (Blue Thumb)
