= KWVE =

KWVE may refer to:

- KWVE (AM), a radio station (1110 AM) licensed to Pasadena, California, United States
- KWVE-FM, a radio station (107.9 FM) licensed to San Clemente, California, United States
- KGSV, a radio station (660 AM) licensed to Oildale, California, United States, which held the call sign KWVE from 2009 to 2016
