= KSFO (560 AM) =

Radio station in San Francisco

- San Francisco, California; United States
- Broadcast area: San Francisco Bay Area
- Frequency: 560 kHz

Ownership
- Owner: Cumulus Media; (Radio License Holdings LLC)
- Sister stations: KNBR; KNBR-FM; KSAN; KSFO; KTCT

History
- First air date: August 1, 1925
- Last air date: March 3, 2025
- Former call signs: KTAB (1925–1935); KSFO (1935–2025); KZAC (2025–2026)
- Former frequencies: 1390 kHz (1925); 1250 kHz (1925–1926); 990 kHz (1926–1927); 1070 kHz (1927–1928); 1280 kHz (1928); 550 kHz (1928–1929)
- Call sign meaning: San Francisco (also the ICAO airport code for San Francisco International Airport)

Technical information
- Licensing authority: FCC
- Facility ID: 34472
- Class: B
- Power: 5,000 watts
- Transmitter coordinates: 37°44′43.7″N 122°22′43.9″W

Links
- Public license information: Public file; LMS

KSFO (560 AM), known as KZAC from 2025 to 2026, was a commercial radio station in San Francisco, California, United States. The station operated from 1925 until 2025, and its license was surrendered by its final owner, Cumulus Media, and cancelled by the Federal Communications Commission (FCC) in August 2026. Its transmitter facility was located near the Islais Creek Channel.

The station began broadcasting in 1925 as KTAB, licensed to Oakland on 1390 kHz and owned by the Tenth Avenue Baptist Church. After becoming a commercial station and undergoing several frequency changes, it moved to 560 kHz in 1929. The station was renamed KSFO and relicensed to San Francisco in 1935, and became the city's CBS Radio Network affiliate in 1937.

Under owner Wesley I. Dumm, the Islais Creek transmitter site was expanded during World War II to accommodate the international shortwave stations KWID and KWIX. Built following a request from the administration of President Franklin D. Roosevelt, the high-powered stations transmitted programming overseas and were part of the development of U.S. international wartime broadcasting.

In 1956, KSFO was purchased by Golden West Broadcasters, a company co-owned by Gene Autry and Bob Reynolds. Golden West programmed a full-service format featuring popular music, news and sports, promoted by the jingle "The Sound of the City". Golden West sold KSFO to King Broadcasting Company in 1983, after which the station adopted a pop standards format. In 1986, KSFO shifted to an oldies format emphasizing music from the 1950s through the 1970s and began simulcasting KYA-FM in 1987. First Broadcasting Company acquired the station in 1992 and introduced a mixture of oldies and sports talk before KSFO became a full-time talk station in 1993.

Capital Cities/ABC Inc. acquired KSFO in 1995 and developed it as a conservative talk station. Michael Savage originated The Savage Nation at KSFO before the program became nationally syndicated; other longtime local hosts included Geoff Metcalf, Melanie Morgan and Brian Sussman. During its history, the station also broadcast games of the Stanford Cardinal, San Francisco 49ers, San Francisco Giants, Oakland Athletics, Oakland Raiders and California Golden Bears.

In November 2024, Cumulus transferred the KSFO programming, branding and staff from 560 AM to the more powerful 810 AM facility formerly known as KGO. The KSFO call sign followed in January 2025 and 560 AM became KZAC. KZAC ceased broadcasting on March 3, 2025. Cumulus subsequently considered selling the station but surrendered its license to the FCC in August 2026, ending the 560 AM facility's approximately century-long broadcasting history.

== History ==
=== KTAB ===
The origins of KTAB can be traced to The Hour of Prayer, a daily morning religious program presented on KGO beginning in 1924 by the Reverend George W. Phillips, pastor of the Tenth Avenue Baptist Church in Oakland. The program generated a substantial response from listeners, convincing Phillips that radio could benefit the church. After KGO discontinued the program, Phillips proposed that Tenth Avenue Baptist establish its own radio station. The congregation approved the proposal and raised approximately $35,000 toward construction of the station.

Until 1927, radio in the United States was regulated by the Bureau of Navigation within the Department of Commerce. On August 1, 1925, the bureau sent a telegram authorizing a new radio station for the Tenth Avenue Baptist Church in Oakland, California, operating on 1390 kHz. The station's call letters, KTAB, reflected its owner's name.

KTAB's debut broadcast, at 8 p.m. on August 1, 1925, featured a doxology from the church choir, a classical music performance from trumpeter Grace Adams East and a speech by the Reverend George W. Phillips, the church's pastor. KTAB was issued a formal broadcast license on August 10, 1925, and began broadcasting daily at 1250 kHz eight days later. In its early months, KTAB had a noncommercial format emphasizing church services and other religious programming. The Hour of Prayer resumed on KTAB after the station began broadcasting and remained associated with the station after its operation was leased to commercial interests.

On March 25, 1926, The Associated Broadcasters, a company founded by Tenth Avenue Baptist Church attendees, entered a 20-year lease agreement with the church to operate KTAB. The lease required the station to continue carrying certain Tenth Avenue Baptist Church programs, including The Hour of Prayer. The Associated Broadcasters converted KTAB into a commercial station, and owing to a temporary lack of U.S. Department of Commerce regulation of radio station wavelengths or power levels under the Radio Act of 1912, KTAB moved to a better frequency of 990 kHz in June 1926.

Following the passage of the Radio Act of 1927 in April of that year, the newly formed Federal Radio Commission (FRC) relicensed KTAB to broadcast on 1070 kHz with a power of 500 watts, effective June 1, 1927. Following an appeal, the FRC allowed KTAB to broadcast with 1,000 watts on Sundays in July and August 1927.

After the Pickwick Broadcasting Corporation purchased The Associated Broadcasters on August 1, 1928, KTAB's studios moved from Oakland to the Pickwick Hotel at Fifth and Mission Streets in San Francisco on September 29, 1928. Around that time, KTAB moved from 1070 to 1280 kHz, before sharing airtime with KLX at 550 kHz on November 11, 1928. By early 1929, KTAB broadcast full time on 550 kHz after KLX moved to 880 kHz, and KTAB had an on-air backronym slogan, "Knowledge, Truth, And Beauty." KTAB moved to the station's present frequency of 560 kHz in November 1929.

Having operated the station since 1926, Associated Broadcasters outright bought KTAB from Tenth Avenue Baptist Church in early 1930, and KTAB began broadcasting at 1,000 watts day and night beginning in October 1930. On March 14, 1933, the KTAB studios returned to Oakland, this time at Sweet's Ballroom, then at 1424 Franklin Street. Pickwick sold The Associated Broadcasters to mortgage banker Wesley I. Dumm and business partner Philip G. Lasky in the fall of 1933. As part of the arrangement, Dumm agreed to continue providing the church with a daily half-hour of airtime for The Hour of Prayer, as well as five hours on Sundays.

The Dumm–Lasky group moved KTAB's studios from Oakland to the Russ Building in San Francisco. KTAB moved from a penthouse apartment to the entire 31st floor of the Russ Building on April 11, 1935.

=== Early history as KSFO (1935–1955) ===
KTAB changed its call signs to KSFO and city of license to San Francisco on May 2, 1935. Some early programming on KSFO was rebroadcast from KNX in Los Angeles. National programs on KSFO included Alka-Seltzer Newspaper of the Air, Cowboy Church with Stuart Hamblen, and Father Coughlin. As early as 1936, KSFO broadcast Stanford University football games.

On January 1, 1937, KSFO replaced KFRC as San Francisco's CBS Radio affiliate. Nearly seven months after the Federal Communications Commission (FCC) granted a construction permit, KSFO began broadcasting at its current power of 5,000 watts from a new 389-foot steel transmitter at Pier 92 and Islais Creek. KSFO's studios moved from the Russ Building to the Palace Hotel on August 12, 1938.

After purchasing a stake in KROW, Lasky resigned from KSFO in 1940 to manage KROW. Effective December 31, 1941, KSFO was no longer affiliated with CBS Radio, after the network moved to KQW in San Jose. Going forward, KSFO had an independent music and news format.

KSFO again moved its studios in August 1943, this time to the Mark Hopkins Hotel, with which The Associated Broadcasters signed a long-term lease in 1942. In 1948, KSFO sought a construction permit to exchange frequencies with KQW, which then had a 50,000 watt signal at 740 kHz. The construction permit was withdrawn in 1950 after KSFO's new co-owned television station KPIX became a CBS affiliate. After nine years at the Hopkins Hotel, in February 1952, KSFO moved to a shared office space with KPIX at 2655 Van Ness.

On March 6, 1953, Don Sherwood debuted on KSFO as host of the morning show. KSFO's licensee was renamed San Francisco Broadcasters on May 25, 1954, in advance of the Dumm–Lasky ownership group selling KPIX to Westinghouse Broadcasting.

On February 15, 1955, KSFO moved studio quarters to the Fairmont Hotel, on California Street (1955-1983).

==== World War II shortwave broadcasting ====
Following the United States' entry into World War II, KSFO owner Wesley I. Dumm became involved in the development of American international broadcasting. At the request of the administration of President Franklin D. Roosevelt, Dumm established two international shortwave stations at KSFO's Islais Creek transmitter site, KWID and KWIX.

The shortwave facilities were constructed rapidly following the December 1941 attack on Pearl Harbor. KWID operated with 100,000 watts and KWIX with 50,000 watts; the two stations were broadcasting within weeks of the attack. Accommodating the transmitters required an expansion of KSFO's 1937 transmitter building, while additional antenna arrays were erected on land surrounding the Islais Creek site.

The stations were used to transmit programming overseas during the war and became part of the expansion of U.S. government international broadcasting that produced the Voice of America. Dumm was also involved in organizing the emerging international broadcasting service. The wartime operations made the Islais Creek property a combined domestic and international broadcasting facility housing KSFO and the high-powered shortwave transmitters.

The shortwave operation also affected KSFO's studio facilities. The combined activities of KSFO, KWID and KWIX required expanded production facilities, and Associated Broadcasters developed a new studio complex at the Mark Hopkins Hotel on Nob Hill.

The U.S. government continued leasing KWID and KWIX after World War II. The shortwave stations ceased operation on June 30, 1953, when the government terminated its lease of the facilities. Associated Broadcasters elected not to continue the international service, and the shortwave transmitting equipment was subsequently sold.

=== "The Sound of the City" (1956–1983) ===
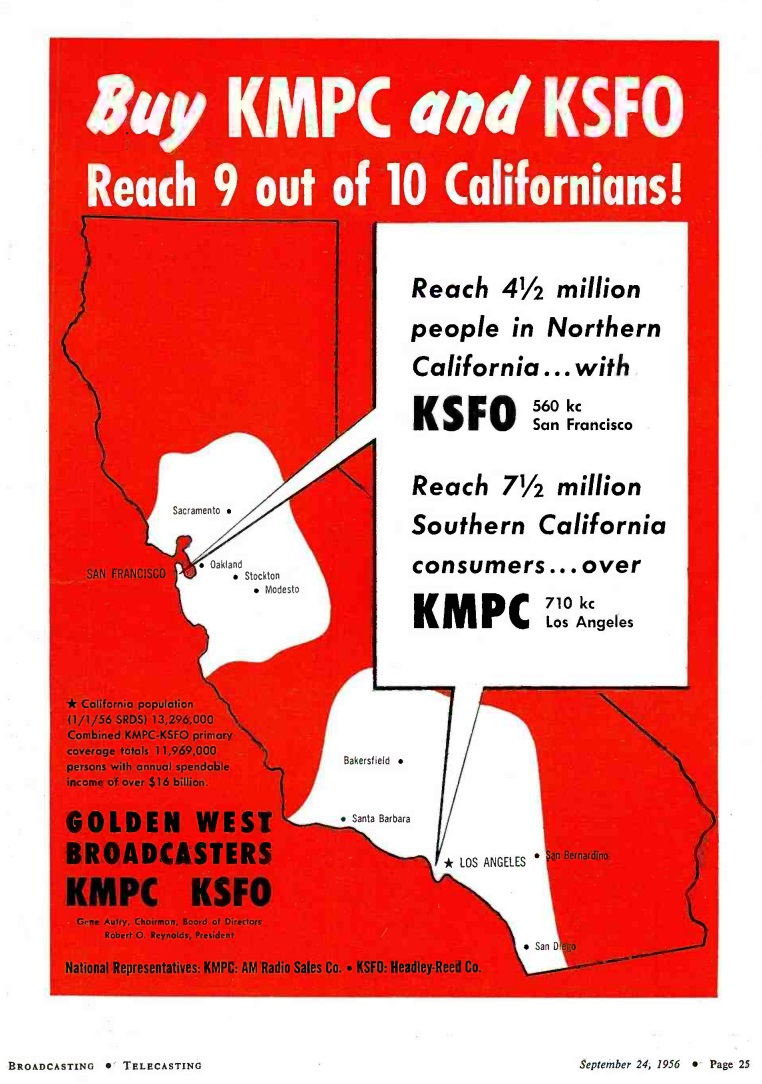
1956 Golden West advertisement

In June 1956, San Francisco Broadcasters sold KSFO for nearly $1 million to Golden West Broadcasters, a company co-owned by Western movie actor Gene Autry and former football player Bob Reynolds. On the morning of December 19, 1956, AFTRA union members went on strike at KSFO after being unable to reach an agreement for a new contract. As a result, KSFO joined three other Bay Area radio stations, KLX, KROW, and KYA, in a collective bargaining agreement.

Golden West launched a full service format that featured personality-driven middle of the road (MOR) music programs, local news, and local sports. Additionally, KSFO's slogan was "The World's Greatest Radio Station." Its signature jingle, "The Sound of the City" with words and music composed by Johnny Mann, was sung a cappella by eight studio singers at the United Western Recorders studio in Hollywood. According to San Diego State University communications professors Joseph S. Johnson and Kenneth K. Jones, the jingle "has such a lovely melody and lyrics that station listeners request it, and records of the jingle have sold in music stores. Outside of San Francisco, similarly formatted stations adapted "The Sound of the City" for their markets.

Johnson and Jones observed that KSFO "always played from a wide spectrum of popular music" in a "free-form, but controlled" way, with "current hits, oldies, [and] a lot of pieces from albums (and not always the same cut from the same album)." Golden West turned KSFO into the most popular radio station in the San Francisco Bay Area. In the March 1964 Billboard radio response survey for San Francisco, KSFO was the top station among listeners for pop LPs, non-rock singles, folk music, and comedy; for jazz, KSFO ranked second behind KJAZ. By January 1967, RKO General's KFRC knocked KSFO out of the no. 1 spot in Bay Area ratings. Additionally, KSFO faced additional competition for its target 25-to-49 age group from FM progressive rock stations KMPX and KSAN.

From 1957 to 1980, KSFO was the radio home of the San Francisco 49ers football team. Initially, Bob Fouts was on play-by-play and Lon Simmons on color commentary. Beginning in 1961, Simmons was elevated to play-by-play. Both of the Bay Area's Major League Baseball teams had games on KSFO. From its first season moving from New York in 1958 to 1978, the San Francisco Giants broadcast their games on KSFO, with notable announcers including Russ Hodges, Lon Simmons, Al Michaels, and Joe Angel. Then starting in 1981, KSFO was the radio home of the Oakland A's, with a broadcast team of Bill King, Lon Simmons, and Wayne Hagin.

Jim Lange joined KSFO as afternoon host in January 1960. In November 1960, KSFO hired Al "Jazzbo" Collins, former host of NBC's Tonight. When Lange began hosting TV shows in Los Angeles such as The Dating Game in 1965, Lange moved to mornings on KSFO in order to accommodate his TV taping schedule. In 1968, KSFO hired Terry McGovern away from KDKA in Pittsburgh.

Beginning in the 1969–70 sports season, KSFO began 16 seasons of broadcasting Stanford University football and basketball games.

In response to market research showing that most of its daytime audience preferred watching television at night, KSFO hired John Gilliland in 1971 to host a five-hour variety block of music and entertainment evenings from 7 p.m. to midnight; Gilliland would continue as host until 1978. In addition to music, Gilliland's program featured the CBS Radio Mystery Theater, dramas and other serials from the Golden Age of Radio, comedy shows, and Gilliland's Pop Chronicles music documentaries. KSFO broadcast Mystery Theater so that local CBS Radio affiliate KCBS did not have to interrupt its all-news programming.

After a decline in ratings in the mid-1970s, KSFO began diversifying its music playlist. KSFO continued playing Frank Sinatra, Tony Bennett, and Peggy Lee, whose music had been phased out of many MOR stations. The station added tracks from Ernestine Anderson and contemporary artists like The Carpenters and Bette Midler. In the October/November 1976 Arbitron survey, KSFO was the most popular station among women aged 25 to 49 and averaged 10,800 listeners aged 18 to 49 per hour, between KCBS and KFRC. KSFO was the station that broke Elmo and Patsy's "Grandma Got Run Over by a Reindeer" to national fame.

The station's news department earned national and international journalism awards for coverage of the 1978 Peoples Temple mass suicides in Jonestown, Guyana and the assassinations of San Francisco Mayor George Moscone and Supervisor Harvey Milk by former Supervisor Dan White.

=== Sale to King Broadcasting, simulcast of KYA-FM (1983–1991) ===
By 1983, KSFO's nighttime power increased from 1,000 to 5,000 watts, the same as its daytime power. In June 1983, Golden West reached an agreement to sell KSFO to Seattle-based King Broadcasting Company, which also owned KYA and KLHT (later KYA-FM) in San Francisco, for a reported $8 million.

At 12:01 a.m. on December 13, 1983, King Broadcasting officially owned KSFO and flipped the station to pop standards, a tribute to KSFO's popular format from those decades, aimed at listeners aged 35 to 54. King Broadcasting brought back former KSFO personality Al "Jazzbo" Collins from WNEW in New York City to host a late night jazz show. KSFO's studios were now at 300 Broadway along with King Broadcasting's renamed KYA-FM.

In July 1986, seeking to attract Baby Boomer listeners, King Broadcasting changed KSFO's music format to be similar to KYA-FM. KSFO played oldies from 1956 to 1973, while KYA-FM had a broader playlist with hits extending as late as 1980. By March 1987, KSFO began simulcasting KYA-FM, with breakaways for Oakland A's games.

=== First Broadcasting ownership, sale to Capital Cities/ABC (1992–1994) ===
On January 27, 1992, the First Broadcasting Company bought KSFO and 93.3 KYA-FM for $13 million. KSFO signed a three-year contract in May 1992 to broadcast University of California, Berkeley (Cal) men's basketball games.

On September 28, 1992, KSFO dropped its simulcast with KYA-FM and began a new format with oldies during the day and sports talk at night. Among its new programs were the syndicated Talk Sports with Pete Rose and Sports Byline USA. However, sports programming was short lived. In November, KSFO lost the rights to Oakland A's games after 12 seasons to KNEW (then on 910). The following month, KSFO began phasing out all sports talk programming and added Wolfman Jack in evenings.

KSFO dropped the oldies format on September 20, 1993, for a talk format, with Gene Nelson and Peter B. Collins hosting drive time shows and nationally syndicated hosts in other times including G. Gordon Liddy, Larry King, and Bruce Williams. Around the end of 1993, KSFO disabled its C-QUAM stereo sound system.

Entering a local marketing agreement with Capital Cities/ABC Inc., which also owned KGO-AM and -TV at the time, First Broadcasting hired new president and general manager Mickey Luckoff for KSFO on September 1, 1994, and moved the station from 300 Broadway to the ABC Broadcast Center at 900 Front Street with the KGO stations. Rebranding as "Radio with Attitude," KSFO completely revamped its programming, hiring former NPR reporter Emil Guillermo as a host and picking up national shows The Dr. Laura Schlessinger Show, The Tom Leykis Show and The Fabulous Sports Babe. On February 14, 1995, the FCC waived its rule allowing companies to own only one radio station per market to allow Capital Cities/ABC, parent company of the KGO AM and TV stations that was already operating KSFO, to purchase KSFO from First Broadcasting. The FCC ruled that the transfer was "consistent with the public interest and would have no effect on diversity and competition in the San Francisco market." Subsequently, Capital Cities/ABC bought KSFO for nearly $10 million.

=== Launch of conservative talk format (1995) ===
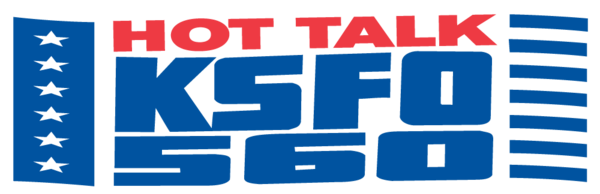
Variants of this logo have been used since circa 1995 to 2016.

KSFO launched its new conservative talk format on January 1, 1995. With the brand "Hot Talk 560" and slogan "The Station for Right-Thinking People," the station introduced a lineup that had J. Paul Emerson hosting morning drive, The Savage Nation with Michael Savage in afternoon drive, and syndicated shows hosted by Ken Hamblin, Michael Reagan, and Pat Buchanan. "In going conservative, KSFO follows a proven national trend, in which conservatives have come to dominate the radio talk show industry," observed Edward Epstein of the San Francisco Chronicle.

In addition, the new KSFO carried news updates from ABC Direction, and Stanford football broadcasts returned for the first time since 1984. Although KSFO initially won broadcast rights to the then-Los Angeles Raiders in late 1994, after the Raiders returned to Oakland in the 1995 offseason, other Bay Area stations began bidding for Raiders broadcasting rights. FM station KSAN (then on 94.9) and AM station KNEW (then on 910) won the Raiders broadcasting rights in 1995. KSFO also dropped Cal basketball after the 1994–95 season, with game broadcasts moving to Concord station KATD.

San Jose Mercury News radio critic Brad Kava responded negatively to the KSFO format change, complaining that station management took "a progressive station that really spoke to the diversity of the Bay Area -- the only station to feature women and minorities in decent time slots -- and replaced it with a bunch of reactionary ranters no different from all the other ranters piling up radio ratings across the country."

Only a month into the job, Emerson resigned from KSFO after his February 14 show, following controversy over allegedly homophobic remarks he made on The Phil Donahue Show calling on people with AIDS to be "quarantined." The new KSFO format's first Arbitron ratings in spring 1995 had a 1.2 share near the bottom of all San Francisco stations, while sister station KGO led the market with a 6.9. Lee Rodgers, formerly of KIRO in Seattle, became morning drive host in the May 1995, with Melanie Morgan as co-host. In October 1995, Geoff Metcalf joined KSFO.

=== Sale to Disney, growth of talk format (1996–1998) ===
After the Telecommunications Act of 1996 loosened media ownership regulations to allow companies to own up to eight radio stations in one media market, KSFO and KGO parent company Capital Cities/ABC merged with The Walt Disney Company and became ABC Inc. effective October 1, 1996.

After a stint at KGO, Jim Eason returned to KSFO starting on July 15, 1996. After the 1997 season, KSFO stopped broadcasting Stanford football, which moved to upstart sports station KTCT, formerly KOFY-AM. A month later, a bipartisan group of state legislators, including State Senators Mike Thompson (Democrat of St. Helena), Quentin Kopp (independent of San Francisco), and Larry Bowler (Republican of Sacramento) challenged KGO and KSFO hosts including Morgan and Metcalf to provide evidence that the state's new Smog Check II program would harm drivers in California, with allegations including that 60 percent of cars would fail the new smog test.

KSFO's Arbitron ratings rose from 2.2 in spring to 2.8 and 11th in the San Francisco market in summer 1996. Even with 1996 being an election year, KSFO's ratings declined to 2.4 in fall 1996 and 2.2 in the winter. However, KSFO broke into the top 10 of the San Francisco Arbitron ratings by summer 1997 with a 3.2.

Talkers Magazine named KSFO's Savage among the 100 most important talk radio hosts in the U.S. in its March 1998 issue. In a time period with the Clinton–Lewinsky scandal and a California gubernatorial election dominating the news, KSFO was a top-10 station in San Francisco's Arbitron ratings throughout 1998.

=== Savage goes national and leaves, Brian Sussman joins (1999–2003) ===
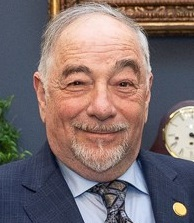
KSFO's The Savage Nation, hosted by Michael Savage (pictured in 2018), became a full nationally syndicated show in 2000.

KSFO continued to be in the top 10 in the spring of 1999 as the impeachment of President Bill Clinton took place. Also beginning in 1999, Savage divided The Savage Nation into local and national versions. KSFO added syndicated shows to its lineup in 2000.The Rush Limbaugh Show debuted July 3, 2000, on KSFO after KNBR dropped Limbaugh in order to create a full-time sports talk schedule. Talk Radio Network began complete national syndication of The Savage Nation on September 21, 2000. In February 2000, SF Weekly published an essay by former KSFO producer Samantha Spivack in which she recounted her experience interacting with whom she called "anti-fans" of KSFO in the Bay Area: "To be conservative, nowadays, particularly in San Francisco, is to be considered hateful. ... KSFO Radio has been described in tones of hysteria as a cauldron of racism and homophobia, a wacko gun-nut unit, a nest of conspiracy theorists spouting political paranoia."

Former KPIX meteorologist Brian Sussman began hosting evenings on KSFO in 2003. Also in 2003, KSFO dropped The Savage Nation on June 2 after being unable to renegotiate a contract with Savage and replaced it with The Sean Hannity Show. The Savage Nation moved to rival station KNEW a month later.

KSFO was also influential in the 2003 California gubernatorial recall election against Governor Gray Davis, with Morgan helping launch a fundraiser for a recall petition and interviewing recall advocates on the morning show.

=== Addition of Oakland Raiders and Mark Levin, sale to Citadel (2004–2006) ===
Beginning in the 2004 season, KSFO was the flagship station for the Oakland Raiders. Following a one-year contract in 2004, KSFO signed a contract extension in 2005.

In February 2006, KSFO added The Mark Levin Show to its schedule. In the same month, Disney announced a $2.7 billion sale of ABC Radio Networks and 22 stations, including KSFO and KGO, to Citadel Broadcasting. The ABC Radio-Citadel merger completed on June 12, 2007.

=== Dispute with blogger (2006–2007) ===
Melanie Morgan attracted media attention in June 2006 after suggesting anyone convicted of treason be sent to the gas chamber, including New York Times editor Bill Keller.

In late 2006 KSFO entered a dispute with "Spocko", a liberal blogger who recorded KSFO talk shows and posted excerpts as examples of hate speech and eliminationist rhetoric, such as Rodgers advocating that a protester be "stomped to death" and Sussman challenging a caller to refer to Allah as a "whore". Spocko began a letter-writing campaign to advertisers on KSFO, alerting them to these examples and urging them to withdraw their support of the station. Some advertisers, including Netflix, MasterCard, Bank of America, and Visa, stopped running commercials on KSFO. On December 22, 2006, ABC lawyers sent a cease and desist letter to Spocko, demanding that he remove the KSFO audio clips due to copyright violations. Spocko's Internet hosting provider 1&1 Internet complied with the cease-and-desist letter and took down Spocko's Web site.

On January 12, 2007, KSFO preempted the Laura Schlessinger show for a special three-hour program where Morgan, Rodgers, and Sussman responded to Spocko and other critics. Sussman apologized for remarks highlighted by Spocko while calling Spocko's Web site "a complete abuse of the First Amendment."

=== Changes to morning show, end of Raiders affiliation (2008–2010) ===
KSFO made several sports and talk programming changes starting in 2008. Due to budget constraints that resulted from parent company Citadel Broadcasting losing over $800 million in the fourth quarter of 2007, KSFO declined to renew Morgan's contract after it expired on March 31, 2008.

Several more programming changes followed. In 2009, KSFO began carrying the Hannity and Levin shows live in afternoons. Following the 2009 season, KSFO lost the Raiders broadcasting rights to CBS Radio stations KITS-FM and KFRC-AM (then on 1550). Meanwhile, declining advertising revenue and $2.5 billion in debt led Citadel Broadcasting to file for Chapter 11 bankruptcy in December 2009.

Sussman became full time morning drive host on February 19, 2010, after Rodgers retired. KSFO also began broadcasting The John Batchelor Show in Sussman's former 6 p.m. slot. After nearly 16 years managing KSFO and over 35 years with KGO, Luckoff resigned from both stations on October 4, 2010. Luckoff told the San Francisco Chronicle that he had been considering leaving the stations since November 2009 and cited the bankruptcy and management decisions by Citadel as reasons for leaving.

=== Sale to Cumulus, loss of Limbaugh, return of Savage (2011–2012) ===
KSFO changed ownership in 2011 after Cumulus Media bought Citadel for $2.5 billion. The deal was made on March 10, with the purchase closing on September 16.

On January 3, 2012, KSFO replaced The Rush Limbaugh Show with a local show hosted by J. D. Hayworth, a former U.S. Representative from Arizona. This move followed programming changes throughout local radio at the end of 2011, starting with sister station KGO laying off many of its talk show hosts. Limbaugh and some former KGO hosts moved to the newly branded "News/Talk 910" at KKSF, formerly KNEW. Morgan also returned to co-host the morning show with Sussman in 2012.

After Savage won a lawsuit against Talk Radio Network, Savage signed with Cumulus Media, and The Savage Nation returned to KSFO on October 23, 2012.

=== Return of Limbaugh and Cal basketball (2013–2017) ===
Final "560 KSFO" logo, 2016 to 2025.

In July 2013, Morgan left KSFO for the second time, and Katie Green replaced Morgan as morning show co-host.

From the 2013–14 to 2016–17 seasons, Cal men's basketball returned to KSFO for select games. In July 2017, KGO became the exclusive home of Cal sports.

Beginning September 29, 2014, the Limbaugh and Hannity shows returned to KSFO after their former Bay Area station, KNEW (960 AM), changed to Bloomberg Radio.

On March 31, 2016, Cumulus Media announced that longtime KGO radio host Ronn Owens would move to KSFO as afternoon drive host, with KGO planning to replace Owens with all-news programming. However, four days later, Cumulus kept Owens on KGO due to language in his contract forbidding Cumulus from relocating his show from KGO.

=== Later history (2018–2026) ===
Airing the show in early evenings, KSFO became the 600th affiliate of The Dave Ramsey Show, a financial advice show, on January 8, 2018. Beginning in January 2019, The Savage Nation cut back from three hours to a one-hour radio show and separate hourlong podcast; Westwood One introduced The Ben Shapiro Show in place of the last two hours of the Savage radio show, and KSFO began carrying Shapiro following The Savage Nation radio show and podcast beginning February 11. Sussman went on medical leave in October 2019 before officially retiring on January 15, 2020.

On March 2, 2020, KSFO replaced its local morning show with Armstrong & Getty, a syndicated show based at KSTE in Sacramento that had previously been heard on KGO. The Savage Nation radio show ended on December 31, 2020, for reasons that Savage claimed were "constrained for legal reasons", but the show continued as an online-only podcast.

As part of a larger realignment of its San Francisco stations, Cumulus Media moved KSFO's programming, branding and staff to 810 AM on November 18, 2024, displacing KGO's existing sports betting format. The move placed KSFO on one of the Bay Area's two 50,000-watt clear-channel AM facilities, along with sister station KNBR, and substantially increased the conservative talk format's coverage of Silicon Valley and the South Bay.

Programming was initially carried on both frequencies. On January 1, 2025, the KSFO call sign was transferred from 560 to 810 AM, ending nearly 90 years of its use on the 560 kHz facility. The former KSFO became KZAC.

KZAC ceased broadcasting on March 3, 2025. Cumulus subsequently considered selling the station rather than returning it to regular operation. The company filed with the FCC to keep KZAC silent while the station's future was being considered.

By 2026, Cumulus was also seeking to eliminate the cost of the station's longtime transmitter property. The Islais Creek/Pier 94 site was among the leases the company sought to reject as unnecessary as part of its financial restructuring. The transmitter site had served the station since 1937 and had also housed the wartime KWID and KWIX shortwave facilities.

No sale was completed, and on August 5, 2026, Cumulus surrendered KZAC's broadcast license to the Federal Communications Commission. The FCC cancelled the license the following day, permanently ending the 560 kHz facility's broadcasting history.
