= 1998 in radio =

The year 1998 in radio involved some significant events.

== Events ==
- January – KCHZ/Kansas City evolves from Modern AC to Top 40/CHR
- January 2 – A gunman shoots Antario Teodoro Filho, Brazilian politician and radio presenter, during a broadcast.
- January 21 – WBIX/New York relaunches as "Big 105", WBIX. The station evolves to Hot AC by the late spring.
- February
  - After switching formats from "Pure Rock" to Spanish music format on 105.5FM in Long Beach three years earlier, KNAC is resurrected as the internet-based radio station knac.com.
  - WNEW-FM/New York City evolves from classic rock to mainstream rock.
- February 6 – WLAC-FM/Nashville flips from adult contemporary to classic rock.
- March – Davenport, Iowa stations WLLR-FM (101.3 FM, a country station) and KUUL (103.7 FM, an oldies station) swap dial positions.
- March 9 – Washington, D.C. stations WTEM 570-AM and WWRC 980-AM swap dial positions. Two weeks prior, WWRC, a former NBC Radio owned-and-operated station, switched to a business news format, and the 980-AM facility was upgraded to a 50,000 watt day/5,000 watt night signal.
- March 28 – "American Top 40" returns to the airwaves, once again with Casey Kasem as the host. The show is actually the renamed "Casey's Top 40", which Kasem had hosted since its premiere in 1989. Kasem will remain with the program until December 2003.
- May 15 – AC-formatted WISP/Tampa flips to Rhythmic CHR as "WiLD 98.7", WLLD.
- May 27 – American Radio Systems' merger with Infinity Broadcasting officially closes.
- May 29 – SFX's merger with Capstar officially closes.
- May 31 – Nick Digilio broadcast his first program as part of The Nick D. & Garry Lee Show on WGN Radio. He had been reviewing movies with WGN Radio host Roy Leonard since 1985.
- June – Dance-formatted WXXP/Long Island signs on
- June 25 – Modern AC-formatted WALC/St. Louis flips to active rock as "Extreme Radio 104.1" WXTM.
- July – Clear Channel announces the acquisition of Triathlon Broadcasting, getting 32 stations and $190 million in the deal
- August – WYST/Detroit flips from All-70's Hits to active rock as "97.1 K-Rock."
- August 13 – Jacor Communications completes a $620 million merger with the 17-station Nationwide Communications chain, all of which are spun off from the insurance company of the same name. The TV stations are sold to Young Broadcasting.
- August 27 – Chancellor Media announces it would merge with Capstar for $4.1 billion, making Chancellor the owner of 463 stations in 105 markets.
- September 4 – KGLQ/Phoenix drops its classic hits format and begins stunting with a ticking clock. At 3PM this day, "Mix 96.9" debuts with a Hot AC format.
- September 24 – Smooth jazz-formatted KMJZ/Minneapolis-St. Paul flips to Modern AC as "104.1 The Point."
- October
  - KHTQ/Spokane flips from Top 40/CHR to classic rock.
  - WMMS in Cleveland engages in "The Death of the Buzzard", a month-long event celebrating the station's legendary past, with a plethora of vintage airchecks, interviews and sounders. Rumors had the station retiring the WMMS call letters, rock format and Buzzard mascot in favor of the KISS-FM Top 40 format. This turns out in the end to be merely a stunt; only the airstaff is replaced, but the call letters, format and mascot remain.
- October 8 – Clear Channel Communications announces a $4.4 billion merger with Jacor Communications; the deal is approved the following May, giving Clear Channel about 450 radio stations in 101 markets.
- October 12 – Groove 103.1 KBCD and KACD sign off and become a simulcast of KIIS-FM in Los Angeles.
- November 2 – After a goodbye weekend, WRCX/Chicago drops its 7-year old rock format for urban oldies, branded as "The Beat." New call letters WUBT were implemented on December 21.
- December 4
  - After nearly 11 months with Hot AC, WBIX/New York flips to Rhythmic Oldies as "Jammin' 105", WTJM.
    - 1560 WQEW New York City announces it will drop its Adult Standards format of just over 6 years and also shut down the intellectual unit of WQEW to carry Radio Disney full-time.

== Debuts ==
- January 10 — "Retro Country USA", a two-hour weekly program featuring country music hits of the past. The core group of songs comes from the 1980s, with 1970s and early 1990s songs also included. The show was conceived and created by radio programmer Dale O'Brian, who at the time was programming WWZZ-FM in Washington, DC. The show was originally hosted by radio personality Ken Cooper. In 2012, Cooper retired and was replaced by "Big" Steve Kelly. The show is syndicated both nationally and internationally by Superadio in Boston, Ma.
- February 17 — WMIB-Marco Island, Florida begins broadcasting on the expanded band frequency of 1660 kHz.

== Closings ==
- August 31 — Westwood One's news facility in Arlington closed, which housed staffers for NBC Radio and Mutual. CBS Radio staff were now directly responsible for the production of "Mutual" and "NBC"-branded newscasts from CBS' New York facilities.

== Deaths ==
- January 6 – Alice Frost, 92, American co-star of Mr. and Mrs. North.
- February 18 – Harry Caray, 84, American television and radio baseball broadcaster
- July 27 – John Gilliland, 62, American broadcaster, creator of The Pop Chronicles and member of The Credibility Gap
- August 29 – Richard Beebe, 68, American comedian, member of The Credibility Gap
- August 24 – Jerry Clower, 71, American country comedian best known for his stories of the rural South, appeared on WSM in Nashville, Tennessee
- October 10 – Tony Marvin, 86, American radio and television announcer best known for his work with Arthur Godfrey
- Rita Zucca (born 1912), Italian propaganda broadcaster

== See also ==
- Radio broadcasting
