= KFWB =

AM radio station in Los Angeles, California

- Los Angeles, California; United States
- Broadcast area: Greater Los Angeles
- Frequency: 980 kHz
- Branding: 980 AM La Mera Mera

Programming
- Language: Spanish
- Format: Regional Mexican
- Affiliations: Las Vegas Raiders Spanish Radio Network; Los Angeles FC; Los Angeles Lakers Spanish Radio Network

Ownership
- Owner: Lotus Communications; (Lotus Los Angeles Corp.)
- Sister stations: KIRN; KWKW

History
- First air date: March 3, 1925
- Former frequencies: 1190 kHz (1925–1927); 810 kHz (1927); 830 kHz (1927–1928); 850 kHz (1928); 830 kHz (1928); 950 kHz (1928–1941)

Technical information
- Licensing authority: FCC
- Facility ID: 25457
- Class: B
- Power: 5,000 watts (unlimited)
- Transmitter coordinates: 34°4′11″N 118°11′38.3″W

Links
- Public license information: Public file; LMS
- Website: 980lameramera.com

KFWB (980 AM) is a commercial radio station licensed to Los Angeles, California, United States. Owned by Lotus Communications, it airs a classic regional Mexican music format, with studios on Barham Boulevard, near the Universal City complex, and a transmitter co-sited with KLAC near Lincoln Park in Eastside Los Angeles.

The station was founded by the Warner Bros. Pictures studios in the early days of broadcasting and has kept the same call sign throughout its 100-year history. KFWB adopted a popular top 40 format in the early 1960s under Crowell-Collier ownership. Purchased by Group W in 1966, it carried an all-news radio format initially competing with, and then as a sister station to, CBS Radio-owned KNX. Placed in a divestment trust years nearly a decade after CBS purchased KCAL-TV, the station gradually phased out their all-news format with talk radio shows and later switched to sports as "980 The Beast". The trust spun off KFWB in 2016 and was purchased by Lotus later in that year. In addition to their current ranchera format, KFWB carries Spanish-language play-by-play of area professional sports teams and in 2025 became the Spanish-language flagship of the Los Angeles Lakers radio network.

== History ==
=== The Warner Bros. years ===
KFWB first signed on the air March 3, 1925, initially on the frequency of 950 kHz. The station was started by Sam Warner, a co-founder of Warner Bros. KFWB launched the careers of such stars as Ronald Reagan, Alan Ladd and Bing Crosby during the "Golden Age of Radio". The station was the first to broadcast the annual Rose Parade in Pasadena.

Although theorists believed the call letters stood for its original owner (examples such as "Keep Filming Warner Brothers" and "Four Warner Brothers"), the call sign was sequentially issued by the Department of Commerce, predecessor to the FCC. The station received its call sign just after KFWA in Ogden, Utah, and before KFWC in San Bernardino, both granted in February 1925. Nevertheless, Warner Bros. Cartoons regularly used KFWB as a running gag in its productions.

On February 8, 1937, KFWB opened a new facility on the south end of the Warner Bros. lot. It included six large studios, one of which was a 500-seat theater, and a "multi-manual pipe organ, built especially for broadcasting".

In 1932, a KFWB personality, Al Jarvis, began playing recorded music, a rarity on radio at the time, where music was usually performed live. He called his show "The World's Largest Make Believe Ballroom". In 1946, KFWB brought in two disc jockeys from New York City: Maurice Hart of WNEW, whose morning drive time show Start the Day Right was described as "Words and Music Straight from the Hart", and Martin Block, who shortened Jarvis's title to "The Make-Believe Ballroom". In those days, the DJs selected their own music, from either KFWB's extensive record library or new songs brought to them by "song pluggers". Old and new, vocal and instrumental, were mixed together to the disc jockey's choice.

==== In Warner Brothers cartoons ====
The 1933 Merrie Melodies cartoon I've Got To Sing A Torch Song, released in conjunction with Gold Diggers of 1933, has KFWB written on the microphones in the scenes with the torch song singers. The 1934 Looney Tunes short Buddy's Bearcats directed by Jack King has an announcer broadcasting with KFWB written on a wooden sign.

Bedtime for Sniffles, a 1940 Merrie Melodies cartoon directed by Chuck Jones, has Sniffles the mouse trying to stay awake for Santa Claus, and a radio announcer signs off for the night identifying the station as KFWB. Another cartoon of the same year, The Timid Toreador, directed by Bob Clampett and Norman McCabe, shows an announcer broadcasting over this station, although the action takes place in Mexico.

KFWB was also written on one of the microphones at the end of 1953's Catty Cornered.

== Warner Bros. sells the station ==
In 1950, KFWB was sold to its longtime general manager Harry Maizlish. It soon moved its studios off the Warner Bros. lot to join Maizlish's FM station, KFMV (now KTWV), on Hollywood Boulevard.

== The rock'n'roll era ==
In 1958, the original "Seven Swingin' Gentlemen" (a nickname for the DJ staff) turned KFWB into a rock & roll powerhouse in Los Angeles. Under new owners Crowell-Collier Broadcasting, program director Chuck Blore pioneered the Top 40 format on AM 980, calling it Channel 98 Color Radio. KFWB became one of the most listened-to stations in the Southland and a leader in the Top 40 format around the country. The air staff during the glory days included Bill Ballance, B. Mitchel Reed, Bruce Hayes, Al Jarvis, Joe Yocam, Elliot Field, Ted Quillin, Gene Weed, Gary Owens, Roger Christian and Bobby Dale. Hourly updates were delivered by a staff of respected newscasters, including Cleve Herrmann, Charles Arlington, John Babcock, Beach Rogers, Mike Henry, Hal Goodwin, Al Wiman, Bill Angel, J. Paul Huddleston and Jackson King.

In the mid-1960s, KFWB was overtaken by rival KRLA. Then KRLA was put in second place by the launch of "Boss Radio" at KHJ, and this relegated KFWB to the position of the third-place Top 40 music station in the L.A. market.

== Westinghouse/CBS ==
=== All-news format ===
In 1966, KFWB was purchased by Westinghouse Broadcasting. The previous year, Westinghouse had successfully launched an all-news radio format on WINS in New York City, after that station had been playing Top 40 music. On March 11, 1968, KFWB ended its Top 40 era, and was relaunched as an all-news radio station. The station promoted itself with the slogans "All news, all the time" and "You give us 22 minutes, we'll give you the world", as first used by WINS, although KFWB's format used a 30-minute news cycle. The 22 minutes referenced the then-average length of a Los Angeles commute. Like WINS and co-owned KYW in Philadelphia, KFWB had a running Teletype sound effect in the background during regular newscasts.

Also in spring 1968, another Los Angeles radio station jumped into the all-news format, KNX, owned by CBS Radio. For the next 27 years, the two stations would be competitors, airing television commercials and sponsoring billboards, in an effort to be L.A.'s top radio news outlet.

In 1995, Westinghouse bought CBS Inc., merging the broadcast operations of the two companies, with KFWB coming under the ownership of CBS Radio. For the first several years after their parent companies merged, KFWB and KNX continued to operate separately, as friendly rivals.

In addition to being an all-news station, KFWB also had sports play-by-play contracts. It previously aired Los Angeles Dodgers baseball games and many National Football League games from Westwood One. The NFL broadcasts stopped after the 2007 Pro Bowl, later switching to KABC. With that, the slogan "all news, all the time" returned. However, in 2008, the NFL broadcasts returned for a brief period.

Beginning in 2008, KNX and KFWB were jointly branded as "CBSNewsRadioLA". The CBSNewsRadioLA brand was used for simulcasting special programs and for marketing to advertisers. In addition, there were no longer separate field reporters for KNX and KFWB. CBSNewsRadioLA reporters filed stories for both stations.

Also in the 2009 season, KFWB began broadcasting some weekday baseball games of the Los Angeles Angels of Anaheim, although the flagship station remained the Angels-owned KLAA. On August 13, 2009, CBS announced the NBA's Los Angeles Clippers had signed a multi-year broadcast rights pact, with KFWB carrying every Clippers contest.

Over time, KFWB's ratings gradually dropped. A number of factors may have been involved. KFWB is licensed to transmit with 5,000 watts, while KNX is licensed for 50,000 watts. In its final months as an all-news station, KFWB added more news about the movie and television industries, since many people in the Los Angeles market are employed in those fields. But the ratings continued to fall. The station's last all-news broadcast concluded at 1:00 a.m. on September 8, 2009. Anchors Jan Stevens and Andi Marshall bid listeners farewell and thanked them for 41 years of support.

=== Moving to news/talk ===
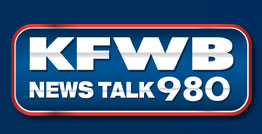
Logo as "News/Talk 980"

On September 8, 2009, the station adopted a news-talk format, limiting the all-news blocks to AM and PM drive times. The station added nationally syndicated shows, including Dave Ramsey, Laura Ingraham, Michael Smerconish and Dr. Laura Schlessinger (who moved from longtime flagship KFI). In 2011, Dr. Laura's show was dropped when she moved from broadcast radio to SiriusXM Satellite Radio. Dave Ramsey shifted to 11a.m.-2p.m. and the station added motivational speaker Les Brown to its afternoon lineup. Brown left the station in 2012. Ramsey's show was discontinued in 2014. By the summer of 2014, KFWB's weekday line-up included: LA's Morning News with Penny Griego and Phil Hulett; Money 101 with Bob McCormick; "As We See It" with Phil Hulett and friends; LA's Afternoon News with Maggie McKay and Michael Shappee; and The Amani & Eytan Show from NBC Sports Radio.

In the early 2010s, the station was authorized by the FCC to boost its power to 50,000 watts, using a directional antenna involving multiple towers. But the power increase was short-lived. A few years later, new owners returned to KFWB's original 5,000-watt output, so the station could broadcast from a single non-directional antenna and take up less acreage of valuable Los Angeles real estate.

On November 2, 2011, CBS Radio placed KFWB into a trust headed by Diane Sutter, under the name "The KFWB Asset Trust". This was due to CBS Corp.'s ownership limitations after the network bought KCAL-TV in 2002.

=== Switch to sports ===
On September 22, 2014, KFWB became a sports radio station affiliated with CBS Sports Radio, cancelling all news blocks and general interest talk programs. The station began calling itself "The Beast 980".

The Beast 980 featured a live and local morning show, The Home Team, hosted by Bill Plaschke and Jeanne Zelasko. The Beast 980's weekday lineup also featured Jim Rome and Fred Roggin. Sports updates were provided during the day mostly by Sam Farber, Amy Bender and Ted Sobel, with Hall-of-Fame USC Trojans broadcaster Pete Arbogast providing sports updates and as a fill-in host from time to time. The Beast 980 was the flagship radio station of the NBA's Los Angeles Clippers and the LA Galaxy soccer team of the MLS. The Beast 980 also carried NFL games, NCAA college football games and NCAA basketball games.

== South Asian programming ==
On January 5, 2016, it was reported that KFWB was in the process of being sold to an operator of foreign-language radio stations. A filing with the Securities and Exchange Commission stated that the station would be acquired by Principle Broadcasting, a company backed by Mercury Capital Partners, for $15 million. The final price in the contract filed with the FCC was $8 million.

As a result of the sale, the station's sports format was discontinued on March 1, 2016. After one day of continuous airings of a five-minute retrospective of KFWB, the station began carrying the full service South Asian Bollywood music format which also was airing on KKDZ in Seattle and KLOK in San Jose. KFWB called itself "Desi 980". On March 16, 2016, the Los Angeles Clippers entered into a multi-year deal making KLAC the team's new flagship station, removing the games from KFWB.

== Classic regional Mexican ==
On October 4, 2016, Lotus Communications agreed to purchase KFWB from Universal Media Access for $11.2 million. The sale was finalized on March 7, 2017. Lotus owns 34 stations in California, Nevada and Arizona, including three in Southern California: Farsi-language KIRN in Simi Valley, ESPN Deportes affiliate KWKW in Los Angeles, and its simulcast partner, KTMZ in Pomona. On October 31, 2016, KFWB switched to a regional Mexican music format as "La Mera Mera 980" (a colloquial expression in Mexican Spanish, meaning, "The Best of the Best"). In 2018, the station was named the official radio station for calling MLS's Los Angeles FC matches.

== Notable former staff ==
- Irving Aaronson and his Commanders (circa 1929), Gary Franklin, Clayton Sandell, Zoey Tur, Ted Sobel and Philip McKeon.

== Studios and transmitter ==
The original KFWB studios and transmitter location were at the Warner Bros. Studios, which is now KTLA, at 5800 Sunset Boulevard. One of the two original towers still stands prominently out front. Due to RF interference getting into the movie studio's "talkies" sound equipment, the transmitter was moved in 1928 to the roof of the Warner Theater, now the Hollywood Pacific Theatre, at 6423 Hollywood Boulevard. Eventually the studios were also moved to the Warner Theater.

Years later, when KFWB was sold to KFWB Broadcasting Co. (Harry Maizlish), the studios moved to 6419 Hollywood Boulevard (now demolished), and the transmitter moved to a site near La Cienega Boulevard and Rodeo Drive, about three blocks south of the KECA/KABC studio/transmitter site. To make way for the construction of a FEDCO membership department store, in July 1958 the transmitter moved to its present location, diplexed with 570 KLAC in East Los Angeles. The studios moved in 1977 to 6230 Yucca Street, also in Hollywood.

In June 2005, KFWB moved into new studios on Wilshire Boulevard in the Miracle Mile district, sharing facilities with Entercom's other L.A. stations, KNX, KTWV and KRTH. Today, the studios and offices are on Barham Boulevard, near the Universal City complex.
