= Don Sherwood =

Don Sherwood may refer to:

- Don Sherwood (politician) (born 1941), American politician
- Don Sherwood (DJ) (1925–1983), American radio personality
- Don Sherwood (cartoonist) (1930–2010), American cartoonist and illustrator
