= Ted Sobel =

American sportscaster and author (born 1953)

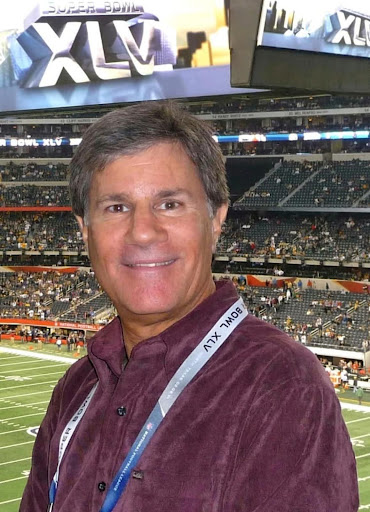
- Sobel in 2011
- Born: July 14, 1953 (age 73); Los Angeles, California, U.S.
- Education: Los Angeles City College
- Occupations: sportscaster and author

Ted Sobel (born July 14, 1953) is an American sportscaster and author who is the longest current tenured Los Angeles-based radio sports reporter. He has worked mostly with CBS Radio since 1985. For two decades Sobel was the network's in-studio host and producer of Sports USA Radio's NFL pre, halftime, and postgame shows and NHL pre and postgame shows in addition to providing in-game scoreboard updates during Sunday NFL doubleheader broadcasts and NHL games including the Stanley Cup Finals. Since 2004, Ted has been a sideline reporter for Sports USA Radio's NFL and NCAA games of the week while also hosting podcasts for the network along with field reporting covering all major sports, most notably the Masters Tournament. Sobel completed his first book Touching Greatness in 2021.

== Education ==
Sobel was raised in Culver City, California, and is a Fairfax High School grad who later enrolled at Los Angeles City College in their Radio and TV Broadcast Department. He is listed as a Los Angeles City College distinguished alum.

== Early career ==
Sobel has been credentialed by the Los Angeles Dodgers, Los Angeles Lakers, and Los Angeles Kings since 1973 and the Los Angeles Rams and Anaheim Angels a year later when he was mostly stringing as a reporter for many of the major news/sports outlets. These included: the Associated Press Radio (AP), United Press International Radio (UPI), ESPN Radio, Mutual Broadcasting System, Westwood One, WFAN Radio in New York, Sports Fan Radio Network, Radio-Canada Montreal (French speaking network), and others. In 1977, Ted became the Public Address Announcer for the Pacific Hockey League's Long Beach Sharks. He also got his first professional play-by-play opportunities that season with the Sharks on local cable TV and on radio with the league’s Phoenix Roadrunners. He has completed 10 seasons of hockey play-by-play including five with the IHL Los Angeles/Long Beach Ice Dogs (until the league folded in 2000) on KPLS and KMAX-FM in Southern California while also being the voice of the first pro sports franchise to ever broadcast a full season schedule on the Internet at Broadcast Dot Com. He also did hockey play-by-play at the University of Wisconsin (including two games vs. the 'Miracle on Ice' Olympic Gold Medal winning team in 1980) on WIBA Radio. He did play-by-play for the New Hampshire/Cape Cod Freedoms of the North Eastern Hockey League and was the club's public relations and media director. He called the playoffs and championship series for the NEHL's Hampton Aces, and was a radio color analyst for the San Diego Mariners of the Pacific Hockey League. Sobel was also the game reporter and in-studio host on the NHL's Mighty Ducks of Anaheim inaugural 1993 telecast on KHJ-Channel 9 in Los Angeles.

== Work in Los Angeles ==
Sobel returned to Los Angeles after his time in Madison, Wisconsin to do radio play-by-play for Long Beach State basketball and football (their last PCAA Conference championship team) on KNAC-FM and U.C. Irvine basketball on KWVE-FM in 1980-82.

In 1985 Sobel began working as a sports anchor and field reporter for the CBS-owned and operated KNX Radio where he continued until joining KMPC Radio when they became the first all-sports station in Los Angeles in 1992. He was an update anchor, field reporter, and talk show host for the Gene Autry-owned station while also producing Los Angeles Rams and UCLA football postgame shows. Sobel continued to work on assignment for KNX most recently covering the 2016 Masters Tournament for Los Angeles' only all-news station. In 1994, Sobel moved over to radio station KFWB where he was also a sports anchor/reporter and talk show host and the lone survivor of four different format changes (the last being all-sports "The Beast 980") until the station was sold in 2016. He also hosted Los Angeles Dodgers pre and postgame shows from 2003-2007 on the Dodgers flagship station and some NBA Los Angeles Clippers pre and post game shows as part of their flagship station. He has reported from numerous Super Bowls, World Series, NBA Finals, Stanley Cup Finals, Rose Bowl games, NCAA Football and Basketball National Championships, Summer Olympics, The Masters, U.S. Open Golf, The Open Championship, PGA Championship, The Championships, Wimbledon, US Open (tennis), World Cup of Soccer, Breeders Cup and Triple Crown horse races, etc. He broke several big stories including the Wayne Gretzky trade from Los Angeles to St. Louis and the NFL's Seattle Seahawks brief move to Los Angeles in 1996.

== Awards ==
Sobel was a three time Golden Mike winner for best sports news reporting in Southern California radio while at KFWB where he also enjoyed being an integral part of a record 10-year run of winning the prestigious Best Radio Anchor Staff awards presented by the Southern California Sports Broadcasters Association. He was honored as a distinguished Communications alum by Los Angeles City College in October 2018. Most recently named to the 2024 class of the Southern California Jewish Sports Hall of Fame.

== Other sports assignments ==
Sobel spent seven years as the 18th green announcer at the LPGA's first major of the year: the ANA Inspiration (formerly known as the Kraft Nabisco Championship) in Rancho Mirage, California. He was the on-court stadium announcer for over 15 years at the now defunct Los Angeles Open ATP World Tour 250 tennis tournament at UCLA (through 2012), most recently known as the Farmers Classic under the direction of Bob and Jack Kramer where he also did tennis play by play for their in-house radio setup to the attending fans. Sobel's extensive voice over work includes many local commercials while also being the hockey arena public address announcer's voice for the 1986 movie Touch and Go for Tri-Star Pictures starring Michael Keaton.

== Personal life ==
A Los Angeles native, Sobel is one of four children born to parents Sherry (née Foreman) and Bernard Sobel. His father was the founder/owner of Bernie Sobel of California, a popular women's apparel label of the 1960s. Sobel's C&S Jobbers women's apparel store at the corner of Olympic and Santee streets in the mid 1960's was most instrumental in starting the clothing outlet store growth in the Garment District in downtown Los Angeles. Ted's mother was a big band and USO singer (including with the Frankie Ortega Orchestra) who used the stage name Shari Fare. She was the sister of seven-time Academy Award nominee Carl Foreman, who won the Oscar for his best written adapted screenplay of the 1958 Oscar winning best picture The Bridge on the River Kwai. Sobel is also a first cousin to author Dr. Amanda Foreman and her journalist brother Jonathan Foreman.
