= Run for Your Wife (2012 film) =

2012 British film by Ray Cooney

- Film poster
- Directed by: Ray Cooney; John Luton
- Screenplay by: Ray Cooney
- Based on: Run for Your Wife by Ray Cooney
- Produced by: Graham Fowler; James Simpson
- Starring: Danny Dyer; Neil Morrissey; Denise van Outen; Sarah Harding; Kellie Shirley; Christopher Biggins; Lionel Blair; Nicholas Le Prevost
- Cinematography: Graham Fowler
- Edited by: John Pegg
- Music by: Walter Mair
- Production company: Run for Your Wife Film
- Distributed by: Ballpark Film Distributors
- Release dates: 19 May 2012 (Cannes Film Festival); 14 February 2013 (United Kingdom)
- Running time: 94 minutes
- Country: United Kingdom
- Language: English
- Budget: £900,000
- Box office: £602

Run for Your Wife is a 2012 British independent comedy film written by Ray Cooney, who co-directed it with John Luton. It is based on Cooney's 1983 play of the same name. The film premiered at the Cannes Film Festival on 19 May 2012 and was released theatrically in the United Kingdom on 14 February 2013. It was critically panned, and is often cited as one of the worst films ever made, grossing just £602 at the box office on a £900,000 budget.

== Synopsis ==
London cab driver John Smith is a bigamist who, soon after getting married, met and later married another woman. He spends his time juggling his two lives, keeping a schedule in his pocket to ensure that his wife Michelle in Stockwell never knows about his wife Stephanie in Finsbury. One day, John intervenes to help a woman who is being mugged, and is hit in the head in the process. Arriving at the hospital with a concussion, the overnight stay messes up his schedule, and things get complicated when both of his wives report him missing to the police. His friend Gary tries to help him, but usually just makes everything worse. A subplot follows two of John's flamboyantly gay neighbours as they try to fix a major leak in their bathroom.

== Cast ==
- Danny Dyer – John Smith
- Neil Morrissey – Gary Gardner
- Denise van Outen – Michelle Smith
- Sarah Harding – Stephanie Smith
- Kellie Shirley – Susie Browning
- Christopher Biggins – Bobby Franklin
- Lionel Blair – Cyril
- Nicholas Le Prevost – D.S. Porterhouse
- Ben Cartwright – D.S. Troughton
- Derek Griffiths – Stockwell police officer
- Nick Wilton – Taxi driver
- Jeffrey Holland – Dick Holland
- Louise Michelle – Frances
- Mike Smithies – Grumpy Oldman
- Paul Curran – The Liar
- Mark Foxwell – The Ghost

=== Cameo roles ===
Note: The DVD of the film was different from the cinematic release. This means that some of the cameo roles did not appear on some versions of the film.

- Russ Abbot – Hospital patient
- Robin Askwith – Bus driver
- Lynda Baron – Nurse
- Richard Briers – Newspaper seller
- Tony Britton – Man on bus
- Judy Buxton – Exercising woman
- Michael Cochrane – Man on bus
- Jess Conrad – Piano player
- Tom Conti – Actor
- Wendy Craig – Nanny
- Bernard Cribbins – Hospital patient
- Barry Cryer – Busker
- Ian Cullen – Wrinkled man
- Pamela Cundell – War widow
- Geoffrey Davies – Man in theatre queue
- Judi Dench – Bag lady
- Les Dennis – Man on street
- Noel Edmonds – Man in shop
- Jean Fergusson – Exercising woman
- Derek Fowlds – Man in hat
- William Gaunt – Man on bus
- Liza Goddard – Exercising woman
- Rolf Harris – Busker
- Nicky Henson – Hospital patient
- Louise Jameson – Doctor's receptionist
- Vernon Kay – Plate-spinning man
- Jeff Leach – Thief in shop
- Maureen Lipman – Exercising woman
- Katy Manning – Exercising woman
- Vicki Michelle – Tourist
- Brian Murphy – Allotment man
- Derren Nesbitt – Man on bus
- Geoffrey Palmer – Man on toilet
- Bill Pertwee – Man on bus
- Jacki Piper – Nurse
- Su Pollard – Shopkeeper
- Linda Regan – Allotment woman
- Cliff Richard – Busker
- Andrew Sachs – Clumsy waiter
- Prunella Scales – Woman at pub
- Jenny Seagrove – Taxi passenger
- Pat Sharp – Man in flat
- Donald Sinden – Man on bus
- Sylvia Syms – Hip operation woman
- Frank Thornton – Man getting off bus
- Wanda Ventham – Lady on Bus
- Marcia Warren – Woman on seat
- Dennis Waterman – Minding person
- Giles Watling – Man in pub
- Moray Watson – Man on bus
- Timothy West – Man in pub
- June Whitfield – Exercising woman
- Finty Williams – Woman on bus
- Simon Williams – Café customer
- Mark Wingett – Man outside café

== Production ==
Attempts at adapting the play to film date back to February 1998, when Fox 2000 Pictures outbid Universal Pictures and DreamWorks Pictures for the rights to the play as a possible project for director Harold Ramis. Over 80 celebrities have cameos in the film, with all of them pledging to donate their salaries to a theatrical charity. Vicki Michelle served as the film's executive producer. During filming, Danny Dyer was mistaken by onlookers for an actual taxi driver. According to the end credits, there was a sequel planned, based on Cooney's later play Caught in the Net. However, the project did not materialise, perhaps due to the film's disastrous box office returns.

== Reception ==
Run for Your Wife had so many overwhelmingly negative reviews upon release that the reviews themselves were widely reported in the UK media. The film was variously described as "a catastrophe", "as funny as leprosy", and "30 years past its sell-by date". The Guardian reviewer Peter Bradshaw said it "makes The Dick Emery Show look edgy and contemporary". The Independent's Anthony Quinn wrote, "The stage play ran for nine years – [the film] will be lucky to run for nine days. Perhaps never in the field of light entertainment have so many actors sacrificed so much dignity in the cause of so few jokes... from the look of it, Cooney hasn't been in a cinema for about 30 years." The cameo-heavy cast was commented upon by several reviewers, with the Metro commenting that "no one emerges unscathed among the cameo-packed cast that reads largely like a roll-call for Brit TV legends you'd previously suspected deceased".

The Daily Record described the film as "an exasperating farce containing not one single, solitary laugh" and said, "Comprised of people losing their trousers and falling over, the film looks like a pilot for a (mercifully) never-commissioned 70s sitcom." An article in the Independent described the film, along with the similarly-received Movie 43, as contenders for the title of the "worst film in history".

The Berkhamsted & Tring Gazette reported that "critics have being queuing up to batter recent release Run for Your Wife, with general agreement that it ranks among the worst British comedies of all time". The South African newspaper Daily News stated that it "could be the worst film in history", and the Studio Briefing website reported that "some writers are making the case that the British comedy Run for Your Wife, written by and starring [sic] comedian Ray Cooney, may be the worst film ever". The Daily Mirror reported a few months after its release that it "was branded the worst British film ever".

Run for Your Wife currently has a 0% rating on Rotten Tomatoes.

== See also ==
- List of 21st century films considered the worst
