= Ichikawa FM =

Ichikawa-FM (JOZZ3AZ-FM)
- Japan
- Broadcast area: Ichikawa, Chiba
- Frequency: 83.0 MHz

Programming
- Format: Defunct(was News/Talk/Music)

History
- First air date: September 20, 1998
- Last air date: June 2017

Technical information
- ERP: 29 watts

Ichikawa-FM was a Japanese local FM radio station (Community FM) in Ichikawa, Japan.
