= KGDP-FM =

- Santa Maria, California; United States
- Broadcast area: Santa Maria—Lompoc, California
- Frequency: 90.5 MHz
- Branding: Family Life Radio

Programming
- Format: Contemporary Christian music
- Network: Family Life Radio

Ownership
- Owner: Family Life Broadcasting, Inc.

History
- First air date: 2003
- Former call signs: KGDP-FM (2003–2006); KRVC (2006)

Technical information
- Licensing authority: FCC
- Facility ID: 79035
- Class: B
- ERP: 17,500 watts
- HAAT: 252 meters (827 ft)
- Transmitter coordinates: 34°44′30″N 120°26′45″W

Links
- Public license information: Public file; LMS
- Website: myflr.org

KGDP-FM (90.5 FM) is a non-commercial radio station licensed to Santa Maria, California, United States, and broadcasts to the Santa Maria—Lompoc area. The station is owned by Family Life Broadcasting and airs a contemporary Christian music format as an affiliate of Family Life Radio.

== History ==
KGDP-FM first signed on in 2003. Originally, KGDP-FM and its sister station, KGDP (660 AM) in Oildale, California, were owned and operated by the group People of Action, through licensee Radio Representatives, Inc. The FM station operated under the moniker "Bread of Life 90.5 FM".

The station changed its call letters to KRVC on February 17, 2006; however, it switched back to the KGDP-FM calls on September 25.

In August 2008, People of Action declared bankruptcy, which led to KGDP-AM-FM ceasing operations on August 31, 2008. The University of Southern California attempted to acquire KGDP-FM through Public Radio Capital for integration into its KUSC classical music network, but the deal faced legal complications and fell through. On September 14, 2009, People of Action sold KGDP-FM to Family Life Broadcasting, Inc. for $130,000. The new owners began operating the station immediately via a local marketing agreement, flipping it to the Family Life Radio network. (In a separate transaction, the AM station was sold to Calvary Chapel Costa Mesa for $120,000 and simulcast KWVE-FM in San Clemente, California until it was sold again in 2016.)
