= A Great Gift Idea =

Studio album by the Credibility Gap
- Released: January 7, 1974
- Genre: Comedy
- Label: Reprise
- Producer: The Credibility Gap, Russ Titelman, Donn Landee

The Credibility Gap chronology
Woodshtick and More (1971)	A Great Gift Idea (1974)	The Bronze Age of Radio (1975)

A Great Gift Idea is an album by the American comedy team the Credibility Gap, released in 1974. It was intended for the Christmas 1973 season, but was delayed by Warner Bros. Records Inc. until January 7, 1974. The team supported the album with a North American tour. It was reissued in 1979, after two of its principals, Michael McKean and David L. Lander, found success on the sitcom Laverne & Shirley, and again 1994.

== Production ==
The album was performed primarily by Richard Beebe, McKean, Harry Shearer, and Lander. Lowell George played guitar on some of the tracks. "In Someone's Sneakers" is a parody of Rod McKuen's poetry. "Where's Johnny?" imagines Johnny Carson's fumbling interviews with a prostitute and a member of a gay rights group. "You Can't Judge a Book by Its Hair" parodies the sound of the Jackson Five. "An Evening with Sly Stone" posits Sly Stone as the host of a television talk show (on which he debates William F. Buckley Jr.); in a joke about Stone's notorious lateness and no-shows, Stone ends his show early to ensure that he can get enough sleep for his upcoming concert. "Kingpin", in the musical style of Curtis Mayfield's Super Fly, conceptualizes Martin Luther King Jr. as the lead in a blaxploitation film. "A Date with Danger" parodies a high school scholastic film about venereal disease.

== Reception ==
Professional ratings
Review scores
Source	Rating
AllMusic	3.5/5 stars
Robert Christgau	A−

The Chicago Tribune opined that "in most of the cases, the group's target are in themselves so ridiculous that the parodies come off second best to the absurdities of the real thing." The Detroit Free Press called the album "an incredibly hilarious set of routines that are masterpieces of subtlety and dry wit." Robert Christgau, writing for Newsday, considered it "the funniest and deepest ... comedy LP in several years." The Los Angeles Free Press said, "In most cases, the Credibility Gap stays dangerously close to its subject, mocking by slight exaggeration, and the overall result is a comedy album that retains its spirit and freshness through more than a few listens."

In 2001, "Weird Al" Yankovic included A Great Gift Idea on his list of the top ten albums he "can't live without". AllMusic concluded, "A fair percentage of A Great Gift Idea is more clever than laugh-out-loud funny, but the best moments are both smart and acidly witty, and the Credibility Gap's no-quarter take on the world around them has dated very little in the decades since its release, and few studio-bound comedy albums of this era are as accomplished as this."

== Track listing ==
Side 1

1. "Kingpin"
2. "A Date with Danger"
3. "You Can't Judge a Book by Its Hair"
4. "Public Service Announcement"
5. "Lance Learns to Box"

Side 2

1. "16 Golden Bits"
2. "An Evening with Sly Stone"
3. "In Someone's Sneakers"
4. "Where's Johnny?"
