= The Credibility Gap =

American satirical comedy team (1968-1979)

- Lew Irwin and The Credibility Gap with (left to right) John Gilliland, Thom Beck, Len Chandler, Richard Beebe, and Lew Irwin from An Album of Political Pornography

Comedy career
- Years active: 1968–1979
- Medium: Radio
- Genre: Satire
- Former members: Lew Irwin, John Gilliland, Thom Beck, Richard Beebe, Len Chandler, Harry Shearer, David L. Lander, Michael McKean

The Credibility Gap was an American satirical comedy team active from 1968 through 1979. They emerged in the late 1960s delivering comedic commentary on the news for the Los Angeles AM rock radio station KRLA 1110, and proceeded to develop more elaborate and ambitious satirical routines on the "underground" station KPPC-FM in Pasadena, California.

Founded as a loose collective centered on KRLA staff members Lew Irwin, John Gilliland, Thom Beck, Richard Beebe, and folk singer Len Chandler, the group is chiefly remembered today for its 1971–79 lineup, comprising Beebe (though early 1975), Harry Shearer, David L. Lander and Michael McKean.

== History ==
=== Lew Irwin and The Credibility Gap ===
The Credibility Gap grew out of a company formed by Lew Irwin and Cliff Vaughs. KRLA 1110 hired news director Irwin to form The Credibility Gap in 1968 with his radio colleagues John Gilliland, Thom Beck, Richard Beebe, and folk singer Len Chandler. They took their name from the Vietnam-era term "credibility gap" (a euphemism for political dishonesty), and broadcast their comedy along with the news on KRLA. They first aired on the date of the 1968 California Primary. In 1968 (billed as "Lew Irwin and The Credibility Gap") they released An Album Of Political Pornography for Blue Thumb, consisting of highlights from their radio sketches. Thom Beck left in late 1968, and was replaced by Harry Shearer in 1969. Lew Irwin left a few months later, replaced by David L. Lander in February, 1969.

=== The Credibility Gap ===
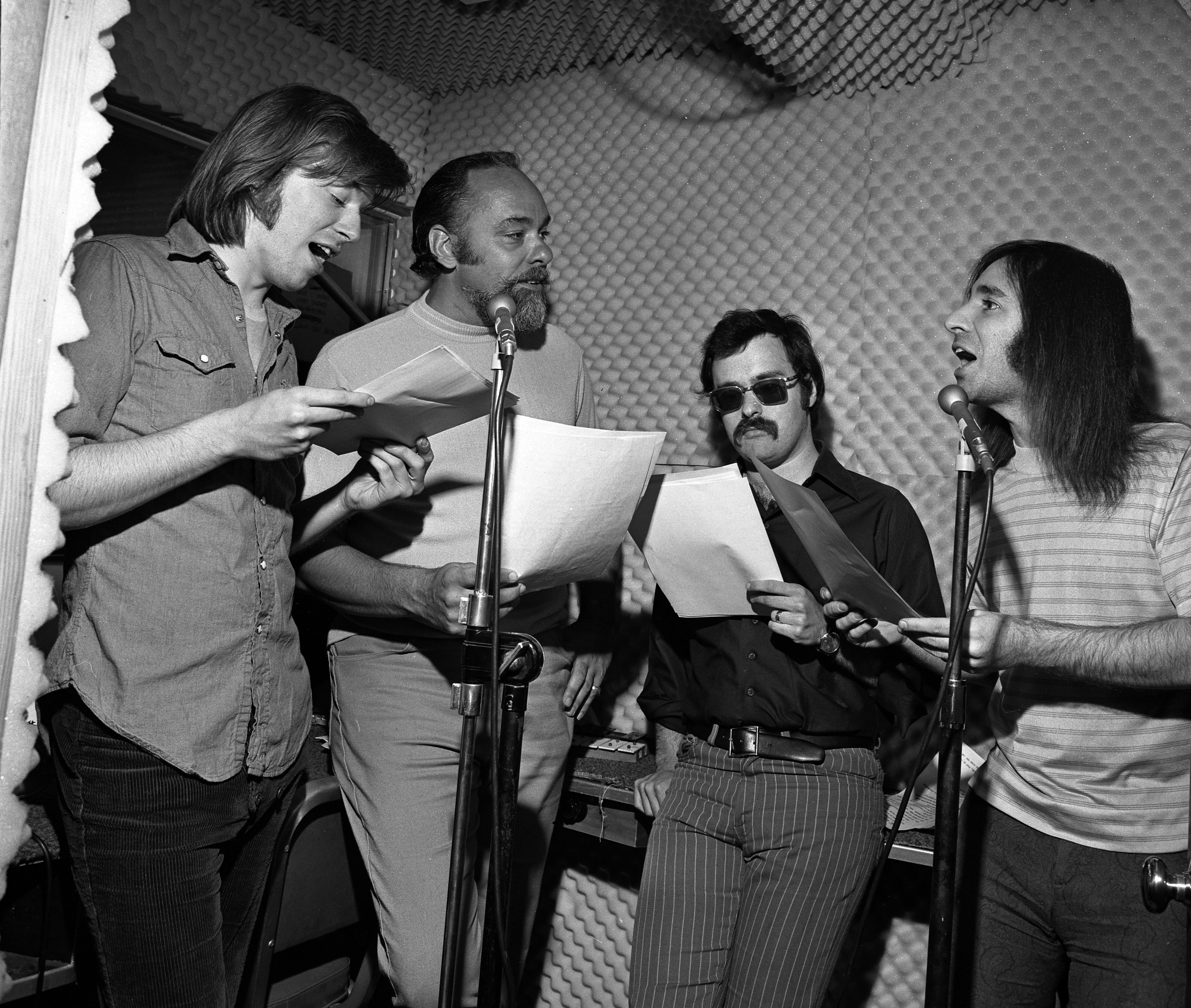
The Credibility Gap with (left to right) Michael McKean, Richard Beebe, David L. Lander, and Harry Shearer

In 1969, The Credibility Gap performed on KRLA's Pop Chronicles music documentary series. By this point, Gilliland and Chandler had left, to be replaced by Bob Goodwin. This left Beebe the only original professional news member remaining. A Pasadena Playhouse Theatre alumnus, Beebe's booming radio voice and quick improv helped The Credibility Gap make some of the most original comedy of their time. Goodwin stayed with the group for about a year.

By late 1970, the Credibility Gap was officially a trio consisting of Beebe, Harry Shearer (who was hired after sending a tape to the radio station) and David L. Lander, who joined three months after Shearer, after being recommended for making funny messages on their answering service, and due to staff outages resulting from the Hong Kong flu. Micheal McKean was a frequent contributor in 1970/71, but not officially a member of the group until the end of 1971.

KRLA dropped The Credibility Gap's show in 1970, but Shearer found work as a disc jockey on freeform station KPPC and The Credibility Gap continued their on-air performances there. In 1971, the trio released the album Woodschtick, consisting of two long pieces: an a-side ("Woodschtick") that reimagines Woodstock as a Catskills comic festival, and a b-side ("Earwitness News")that ridicules popular early 1970s mainstream media points of view, that were somewhat in the style of The Firesign Theatre. Also writing and performing on the album was Michael McKean, who would be promoted to full membership after the album's release. Guest performers Christopher Ross, Morgan Upton and Albert Brooks would also work with the group during this era. Lander appeared in Brooks' first short film, The Famous Comedians School, that was aired in 1972 on the PBS show The Great American Dream Machine. Mark Deming writes of this transition:

[I]n late 1968, Thom Beck left the group, and Lew Irwin followed in early 1969 .... Joining the Credibility Gap in their absence were Harry Shearer ... and David L. Lander.... By 1970, Len Chandler and John Gilliland had drifted away from the Credibility Gap, and ... Michael McKean, had joined the team, though the troupe's relationship with KRLA had soured and their show had been shrunk from 15 minutes to a mere 180 seconds. However, after Shearer landed a side gig as a disc jockey on an FM "free form" outlet, KPPC, the Credibility Gap found a new home on the station, and the group's satire gained both sharpness and depth.

KPPC-FM fired all of its airstaff, including the members of The Credibility Gap, as part of a mass format change in 1971. No longer radio regulars, the group started performing in various clubs and concert venues. They also returned to the studio in 1972 to record a promo-only single for Warner Brothers, a four-and-a-half minute mini mock-rock opera called Something for Mary (1973, PRO 517).

The Credibility Gap followed up this recording with the 1974 album A Great Gift Idea, which mixed satirical sketches with musical parodies. McKean and Shearer played guitar and keyboards, respectively, on the album, augmented by members of the band Little Feat.

Beebe left the Gap in 1975 to join Los Angeles FM rock station KMET, remaining in radio news for over 40 years with 2 Golden Mic awards (Golden Mike Award). The Credibility Gap continued as a trio (Lander, McKean and Shearer) through 1979, but after 1976 individual members tended to focus on other projects and the group itself made only sporadic, widely spaced appearances. McKean and Lander "moonlighted" by performing at the Pitschel Players Cabaret, but soon landed roles on the television series Laverne & Shirley that lasted from 1976 through 1983, bringing them widespread exposure. Shearer worked as a consultant for the TV series Fernwood 2-Night, as well as co-writing comedy albums and the 1979 feature film Real Life with Albert Brooks.

Functioning now more as an occasional side-project to three busy performing/writing careers, The Credibility Gap issued a single ("The Day the Lights Stayed on in Pittsburgh") in 1977, appeared as sketch performers (performing their own material) in the low-budget 1977 film Cracking Up, and continued their New Year's Day Rose Parade broadcasts (which started in the mid-1970s) annually through January 1, 1979. Highlights of the parade broadcasts were collected on the 1979 album Floats. As well, selections from their earlier radio material were compiled on 1977's The Bronze Age of Radio.

Shearer became a writer/performer on Saturday Night Live in September, 1979. This necessitated Shearer's move to New York and essentially brought The Credibility Gap's activities to a close.

=== After The Credibility Gap ===
The group disbanded in 1979, but the members have occasionally worked together since, most notably the pairings of McKean and Lander as Lenny and Squiggy on the situation comedy Laverne & Shirley (recording an album in character as "Lenny and the Squigtones") and Shearer and McKean as members of the mock-rock band Spinal Tap. In 1998, Richard Beebe passed. In 1999, the remaining Gap members held a reunion at the Museum of Television and Radio in honor of Beebe. Beebe's family, in Richard's absence, donated all original Credibility Gap recordings from 1968-1972 to the Paley Center.

== Discography ==
=== Lew Irwin and The Credibility Gap ===
- An Album of Political Pornography (Blue Thumb, 1968)

=== The Credibility Gap ===
- Woodshtick and More (1971) Capitol Records (ST-681)
- A Great Gift Idea (Reprise, 1974)
- The Bronze Age of Radio (Waterhouse, 1977)
- A Great Gift Idea & Floats(Double LP) (Sierra, 1979)
