= Gary Franklin =

German-American film critic (1928-2007)

- Born: September 22, 1928
- Died: October 2, 2007 (aged 79); Chatsworth, California, U.S.
- Education: City College of New York
- Occupation: Film critics

Gary Franklin (September 22, 1928 – October 2, 2007) was a German American broadcast film critic based in Los Angeles, California.

== Early life ==
He was born to a Jewish family in Leipzig, Germany. His father was a doctor for the German Army during the First World War. His family moved to the United States in 1938 to escape persecution by the Nazis and changed the family name from "Zlotnitzki" to "Franklin". Franklin earned a bachelor's degree in film at the City College of New York. He worked as a cameraman for the United States Army during the Korean War. He began creating documentaries in New York City and Canada following his return for the war.

== Career ==
Franklin began his broadcasting career in 1954 in Virginia. He worked for several radio and television stations throughout the United States before his career led him to Los Angeles in 1972 where he became a roving night-side news reporter for all-news radio station KFWB. While at KFWB, Franklin occasionally contributed film reviews and in 1981 he was hired by KNXT (now KCBS-TV) as a full-time film critic. Franklin's career as a film critic was most associated with KABC-TV where he was employed from 1986 to 1991. While at KABC-TV, he used a 1-to-10 ratings scale (10 being the best) calling it "The Franklin Scale" for his movie reviews. Franklin was an established photographer documenting major events in the 20th century and Hollywood industry personalities.

== Death ==
Franklin suffered four separate strokes in the final years of his life. He died on October 2, 2007, at his home in Chatsworth, California at the age of 79. He is survived by his wife, two daughters, and four grandchildren.
