= Brian Sussman =

American meteorologist and conservative radio host

Brian Jay Sussman (born April 3, 1956) is an American conservative talk radio host and former meteorologist in the San Francisco Bay Area who was most recently at San Francisco radio station KSFO.

After graduating from the University of Missouri, Sussman began his professional career as both the News Director and evening anchor for KCBJ in Columbia, Missouri in 1978 (now KMIZ-TV). Sussman became a weather and feature reporter for KOLO-TV in Reno, Nevada in 1980. After stints at KNTV in San Jose, California and KDKA-TV in Pittsburgh, Sussman was the chief meteorologist for KPIX in San Francisco from 1989 to 2000. Sussman won numerous awards while with KDKA and KPIX.

After leaving KPIX, Sussman switched to conservative talk radio. From 2003 to 2010, Sussman hosted an evening talk show on KSFO before moving to the station's morning drive show, where he would host from 2010 to 2019. In addition, Sussman has written three books critical of the scientific consensus on climate change.

== Personal background ==
Sussman was born in 1956 in East Los Angeles, California. Raised in Golden, Colorado and Northbrook, Illinois, he graduated from Glenbrook High School in 1974. Sussman graduated from the University of Missouri in 1978 with a B.S. in radio, television, and film. Sussman grew up in a Jewish family and converted to Christianity while in college. He married Sue Rittenhouse in 1978. They have four children, three of whom were adopted. Quite active in his faith, Sussman is a popular Christian speaker and leads a weekly international Bible study privately attended by men from all over the world.

== Television career ==
Sussman began his television career in 1977 as an anchor for Columbia, Missouri television station KCBJ. In 1980, Sussman joined KOLO-TV of Reno, Nevada as a weather and feature reporter. Sussman had an exclusive interview with the Reverend Billy Graham when Graham visited Reno for his 270th crusade in 1980. In 1983, Sussman became weather reporter with KNTV of San Jose, California. While working for KNTV, Sussman attended graduate meteorology courses at San Jose State University. Sussman was part of an evening newscast at KNTV that won a local Emmy Award for best newscast in 1985.

In 1987, Sussman moved to Pittsburgh to join KDKA-TV, then a Group W station, as a meteorologist. While at KDKA, Sussman volunteered at local schools to teach children meteorological concepts, on behalf of nonprofit organisation For Spacious Skies. Sussman also won the Radio-Television News Directors Association (RTNDA) award for best local weathercast in 1987.

From 1988 to 1993, Sussman was under contract to be substitute weather anchor for CBS This Morning. Sussman was the evening news meteorologist with Group W's San Francisco TV station KPIX from 1989 to 2000, where he won RTNDA best local weathercast awards from 1990 to 1995 and 1997 to 1999. At KPIX, Sussman also hosted a weekly five-minute segment called "Brian's Kids" that profiled foster children. "Brian's Kids" led to the adoption of nearly 400 children, including one by Sussman. Expressing a desire to spend more time with his family, Sussman left KPIX on December 22, 2000, shortly after the retirement of longtime anchor and local personality Dave McElhatton; Sussman joined Heidrick & Struggles as a recruiter in January 2001.

== Radio and podcasting career ==
While attending the University of Missouri, Sussman hosted a jazz music show on the university's student radio station KCOU. During his senior year at Missouri in 1977–78, Sussman hosted an overnight Sunday talk show on local radio station KFRU.

Sussman began his radio career as a guest host on San Francisco Christian radio station KFAX on September 11, 2001, after the regular host was unable to work due to a delayed flight. After working as a guest host on San Francisco conservative talk station KSFO in 2002, Sussman began hosting an early evening talk show on KSFO in 2003.

Following the retirement of Lee Rodgers, Sussman moved from evenings to morning drive full-time on KSFO on February 19, 2010; Sussman previously hosted the morning show on Mondays. SF Weekly criticized Sussman in April 2011 for promoting Barack Obama citizenship conspiracy theories despite the release of Obama's long-form birth certificate, which Sussman called "doctored."

From 2012 to 2013, Melanie Morgan was Sussman's co-host. In 2018, Sussman won the Don Sherwood Award from the Bay Area Radio Hall of Fame for being the Bay Area's most popular radio personality of the year.

From 2012 to 2019, Sussman was a regular fill-in host on The Savage Nation and The Mark Levin Show.

Beginning in 2018, Sussman launched two podcasts on his website: Hidden Headlines, which discusses news and culture with a promotion of "faith, family and freedom," and Another Chance, where Sussman interviews people who "have personally experienced a divine reboot." His current podcast, The Brian Sussman Show, is heard on a multitude of podcasting platforms.

Sussman retired from radio on January 15, 2020.

== Writing career ==
Sussman maintains a blog on his website. He has also written opinion articles for WorldNetDaily and The American Thinker.

Climategate: A Veteran Meteorologist Exposes the Global Warming Scam, which was published on Earth Day, April 22, 2010 by WND Books. The book's title draws on Climategate, a nickname for the Climatic Research Unit email controversy in which scientists were accused of manipulating data about climate science. In the book, Sussman argues that climate change is independent of human activities, contrary to the scientific consensus. Additionally, Sussman ties climate science to a Marxist redistribution of wealth to Third World countries.

In 2012 he wrote, Eco-Tyranny: How the Left's Green Agenda will Dismantle America, also published by WND Books. Among claims in this book was that the Bureau of Land Management (BLM) under Obama planned on seizing land from private citizens, based on an internal BLM memo that sought ways to merge federal lands.

Sussman's third book, Climate Cult: Exposing and Defeating Their War on Life, Liberty, and Property was published by Post Hill Press in 2024. Dr. Neil Frank, Former Director of the National Hurricane Center presents the book's cover endorsement saying, "Of over thirty books I have read on this topic, Brian Sussman has the best understanding of what the climate movement is all about…Climate Cult is a must-read.”

=== Bibliography ===
- Sussman, Brian (2010). Climategate: A Veteran Meteorologist Exposes The Global Warming Scam. Washington: WND Books. ISBN 978-1-935071-83-9. OCLC 705470311.
- Sussman, Brian (2012). Eco-Tyranny: How the Left's Green Agenda will Dismantle America. Washington: WND Books. ISBN 978-1-936488-50-6. OCLC 767564053.
- Sussman, Brian (2024). Climate Cult: Exposing and Defeating Their War on Life, Liberty, and Property: Post Hill Press. ISBN 979-8888455449
