= KGSV =

- Oildale, California; United States
- Broadcast area: Bakersfield metropolitan area
- Frequency: 660 kHz
- Branding: Radio Punjab

Programming
- Format: South Asian

Ownership
- Owner: XL Media (CA) Inc.

History
- First air date: July 4, 1987; 38 years ago
- Former call signs: KGDP (1983–1989); KSMI (1989–1990); KGDP (1990–2009); KWVE (2009–2016)

Technical information
- Licensing authority: FCC
- Facility ID: 54760
- Class: B
- Power: 8,000 watts (day); 6,000 watts (night)
- ERP: 250 watts (translator)
- Transmitter coordinates: 35°27′9.8″N 118°56′43.3″W
- Translator: 102.5 K273CB (Bakersfield)

Links
- Public license information: Public file; LMS
- Website: radiopunjab.com

KGSV (660 kHz) is a commercial AM radio station licensed to Oildale, California, and serving the Bakersfield metropolitan area. The station is owned by XL Media (CA) Inc., and airs a South Asian radio format known as "Radio Punjab." Affiliated stations carry the same programming in San Francisco, Sacramento and other West Coast cities.

KGSV's transmitter is located off Round Mountain Road in Bakersfield. The station's programming is also heard on FM translator K273CB, on 102.5 MHz.

== History ==
The station went on the air as KGDP on Independence Day 1987, licensed to Orcutt, Calif. serving the Santa Maria/Central Coast market at AM 660 kHz. On October 15, 1989, the station changed its call sign to KSMI and on January 22, 1990, back to KGDP.

KGDP and its sister station, 90.5 KGDP-FM in Santa Maria, California, were originally owned by a local Christian group, People of Action, through licensee Radio Representatives, Inc. In August 2008, People of Action declared bankruptcy, leading KGDP and KGDP-FM to cease all operations on August 31, 2008.

In November 2009, Calvary Chapel Costa Mesa acquired the station, switching it to a simulcast of its San Clemente station, 107.9 KWVE-FM. KGDP-AM 660 changed its call sign to KWVE, relicensed and relocated to Oildale/Bakersfield. Its sister station, KGDP-FM, remained on the Central Coast and was sold that same year to Family Life Radio.

In 2016, the AM station was sold to XL Media. On September 30, 2016, its call sign was switched to KGSV and it began airing programming from "Radio Punjab." Effective August 10, 2017, KGSV's license was assigned to commonly-owned Akal Broadcasting Corporation, and then assigned back to XL Media on August 30, 2019.
