= Richard Beebe =

American radio personality

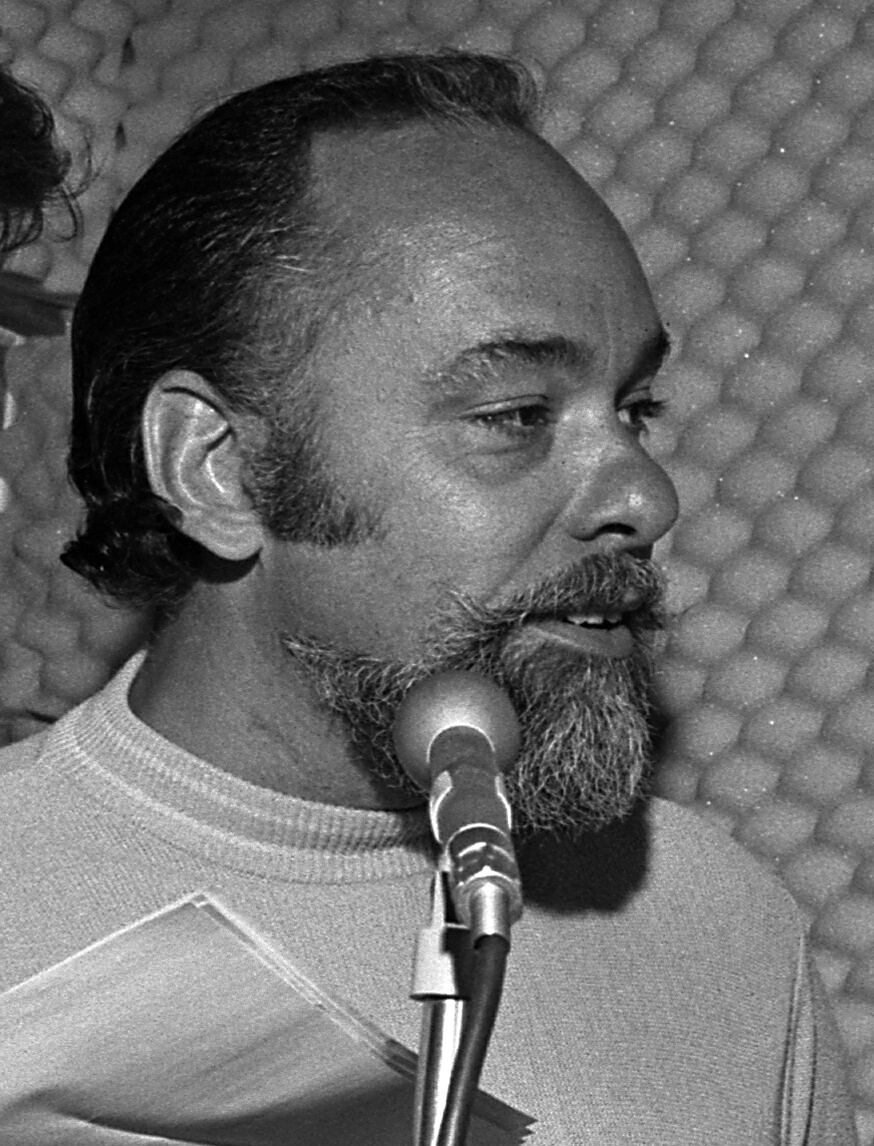
Richard Beebe in 1970

Richard Paul Beebe (December 5, 1929 – August 29, 1998) was an American radio personality who was on the air for five decades in Los Angeles and won two Golden Mike Awards. A journalist at KRLA 1110, he became a founding member of The Credibility Gap. His experience and wit were key to most versions of the group. He became the link between the original and more famous later lineups when he was joined by Harry Shearer, David L. Lander, and Michael McKean, all much younger than he. He left the Gap in 1975. Some of their early work can be heard at The Paley Center for Media in Los Angeles and New York City.

Beebe performed the voice of Dewey Phillips on the Pop Chronicles documentary. He returned to KRLA 1110 in 1991.

An Air Force veteran, he died of lung cancer in 1998.

== Discography ==
- An Album Of Political Pornography, with Lew Irwin and the Credibility Gap (Blue Thumb, 1968)
- Woodshtick and More (1971)
- A Great Gift Idea (Reprise, 1974)
- The Bronze Age of Radio (Waterhouse, 1977)
