= Grace Adams East =

American trumpeter (1900–1968)

Grace Helen Adams East (February 12, 1900 – 1968) was an American trumpeter and performer. During a forty year career that peaked in the 1930s, she performed live shows in local, national and international venues in the United States, Australia, New Zealand, Ceylon, India, England, France and Belgium, and also performed on radio programs in the United States, Australia, and New Zealand. In promotional material and newspaper articles she was described as "America's foremost woman trumpeter". She was also known for promoting the trumpet as a concert and classical instrument. Her repertoire usually included classical music but she often ended her performances with a special trumpet arrangement of George Gershwin's Rhapsody in Blue.

== Early years ==
Born Grace Helen Adams in Los Angeles, California, on February 12, 1900, to Charles Milton and Harriet H. Adams, Grace showed an early aptitude for music. Enrolled in various music programs, she first started performing in music school recitals and school programs playing the piano and singing. One of her first recitals took place in 1909 when she was nine at the Los Angeles Temple auditorium. She took up the trumpet at 11, in part, it was said, to improve her weak lungs.

== Musical career ==
By 1914 Grace Helen Adams was performing often throughout the Los Angeles area. She was described as a "youthful musical prodigy" at her debut at 14 as the cornet solo player with a 40 person brass band in Long Beach, California. Her first major public performance was with the official band of the Panama–California Exposition in San Diego in January 1915. According to a newspaper article, "when she motored down to San Diego ten days ago, the youthful artist went simply to visit the exposition. On the grounds she met one of the musicians with the official band, who upon learning that the talented visitor had her cornet with her, requested that she remain over for a week's engagement as soloist."

Throughout the 1910s she played in many venues, usually churches. At 17 she was on tour in the eastern United States and at its end was offered a vaudeville contract. She declined the contract to return to Los Angeles and finish high school. During World War I she was frequently mentioned in local newspapers as participating in performances at local Army and Navy camps. For example, on January 5, 1918, the San Diego Union noted she performed at Fort Rosecrans and for "all the men of the camps in and around San Diego during the last week". Later that year she started her association with Hollywood when she performed at the Los Angeles Majestic Theater with film stars and members of her high school, Polytechnic, to raise money to buy an ambulance for the troops. At the war's end a San Francisco Bay area newspaper article in 1919 described her as a "well-known Los Angeles cornetist".

By 1920 she married Thomas East and established her stage name as Grace Adams East. She and her husband moved to the San Francisco Bay area. Throughout the 1920s East performed in many Bay Area venues, especially churches and social and civic clubs. She often performed on radio, including on radio stations KTAB, KPO and KGO. In April 1927, a Pacific Coast Musical Review article mentioned she played with other Etude Club of Berkeley members.

Her most active and documented performance period was the 1930s. During that time, she continued to perform in the Bay Area but later began tours in other parts of the United States. She regularly performed on the syndicated NBC radio program. She often performed at churches, schools, and social and musical clubs including the Business and Professional Women's Club Coast Musicians, San Francisco Musical Club, and Kiwanis Club. She was the President of the Etude Club of Berkeley in 1930-1931. She also taught music during the period. One of her students was Richard "Dick" Collins who later went on to be a recognized jazz performer.

In the mid to late 1930s her musical career flourished. This period included a tour through the eastern United States. She played with the US Navy Band and was said to be the first woman soloist to perform with them. She performed in Chicago, New York, Washington, DC and other venues. While in Washington, DC reports said she played at the Daughters of the American Revolution conference at which Eleanor Roosevelt was in attendance. On the same trip, she performed at Easter services near the Washington Monument. In what may be an apocryphal story, she was said to have met President Roosevelt while sitting in his chair in the Oval Office during a private White House tour.

She began to obtain additional recognition and was mentioned in national media. Time magazine reviewed a 1936 concert of hers in Washington DC and described her as "a sure mistress of the trumpet". It also noted her performance on the rim of the Grand Canyon where she played "The Last Roundup" at a memorial service in honor of Will Rogers. She had played at Rogers' last public performance. Talent, a trade publication, identified her as "Acclaimed America's foremost woman trumpeter". Her 1937 promotional brochure highlighted several glowing reviews, including one from the Hollywood Citizen-News, Hollywood, California stating:

The trumpet recital last evening at Wesley Hall by Grace Adams East was a distinct novelty in the routine concert season. Not only is the trumpet seldom used in recital but it is also rare to hear it played superbly by a woman ... Under Miss East's skillful handling it becomes a medium of interpretation in which color and expression are the outstanding characteristics.

Other endorsements included the US Navy Band's concert master and the New York Women's Symphony Orchestra conductor.

By 1937, she arranged a concert tour in Australia and New Zealand. Her husband's untimely death by suicide in January 1938 occurred just before her starting the tour in Hawaii. She played on the radio and at various venues in Australia and New Zealand until September. On her voyage to Europe she played at venues aboard ship and in Ceylon and India. In Europe she played in England, France and Belgium. Her tour was cancelled when war broke out in Europe in September 1939. She returned with many other American refugees to New York. She continued with her career by playing at churches and hotels in New York and at the World's Fair. In 1940 she continued performing and finished the year with performances in Honolulu, an engagement and later marriage to US Navy flight surgeon, Lt. Commander John M. Bachulus.

Her career continued to have some success during World War II. Initially, she performed in the San Francisco Bay area after her husband was deployed overseas. Later, she received attention as she helped organize a Women's Marine Corps Reserve Band, the first ever woman's band in the US Marines. At the end of the war she again toured but this time as a captain with the USO. She performed in Europe in 1945 and was said to perform with the Paul Lukas troop.

== Later career ==
While she continued to give some musical performances in the early 1950s, her interests began to change. After visiting South America, she started giving travel presentations to small audiences in and around San Francisco. Her lectures highlighted South American music and culture. For a short period in the mid-1950s she was the social director at the Desert Inn, Palm Springs, California. Throughout the later 1950s and throughout the 1960s she was mentioned in social events in the San Francisco Bay area. In 1962 she married again and became Grace Adams East Santos. She died in 1968. She had no children.
