= Sie Holliday =

"The 'Pop Chronicles' Team at KRLA, c.1970," with Sie Holliday in the center. Courtesy of The John Gilliland Collection.

Sie Holliday (pronounced "sigh holiday") was the radio name of Shirley Schneider (November 10, 1930 – June 23, 2006). She was a Los Angeles radio personality at KRLA 1962–76 (where she was one of the narrators of the Pop Chronicles) and KMPC 1976–78. She did student radio at the University of Texas. She had been reading promos for KRLA 1110, when in 1962 they put her on the air from 6-10 p.m. Sundays, making her the first female disk jockey in Los Angeles.
