= John Gilliland =

American radio broadcaster and documentarian

- "John Gilliland at KSFO, c. 1971" Courtesy of The John Gilliland Collection.
- Born: John Sanford Gilliland Jr. October 18, 1935; Quanah, Texas
- Died: July 27, 1998 (aged 62); Quanah, Texas
- Career
- Show: The Pop Chronicles
- Station: KRLA 1110
- Show: The Credibility Gap
- Station: KSFO
- Website: John Gilliland's Pop Chronicles

John Sanford Gilliland Jr. (October 18, 1935 – July 27, 1998) was an American radio broadcaster and documentarian best known for the Pop Chronicles music documentaries and as one of the original members of The Credibility Gap. He was born and died in his hometown of Quanah, Texas. He worked for a number of radio stations in Texas and California including KOGO in San Diego (1961–1965), KRLA 1110 in Los Angeles (1965–1970), and KSFO in San Francisco (1971–1978).

== Career ==
=== Texas radio ===
His radio career began in 1952 with KOLJ in his native Quanah, Texas. While attending Texas Christian University, he worked as a disc jockey at KCUL in Fort Worth. His shows were The House of Wax and The Man on the Beat. From 1959-1961 he worked for KLIF in Dallas. He also worked at KILT in Houston.

=== California radio ===
At the news department of KOGO in San Diego, Gilliland used the pseudonyms of John Land and Johnny Land.

In 1965, Gilliland came to the news department of KRLA radio in Los Angeles County, where he became one of the original members of The Credibility Gap which mixed topical humor along with their news broadcasts. Fellow founding member Richard Beebe said of him that

Even though John was an integral part of the "Gap," working on the Pop Chronicles was always number one for him. It seemed like he was always working on it. John was a very talented guy and a lot of fun.

Gilliland researched this radio documentary, The Pop Chronicles, for over two years prior to its broadcast. He interviewed many famous musicians for this show. It covered popular music of the 1950s and 1960s, was originally broadcast on KRLA 1110, later broadcast on many other stations, and now can be heard online.

Starting in 1971, at KSFO in San Francisco, he hosted weeknights 7 p.m.-midnight. In response to market research showing that most of its daytime audience preferred watching television at night, KSFO hired Gilliland in 1971 to host a five-hour variety block of music and entertainment evenings from 7 p.m. to midnight; Gilliland would continue as host until 1978. His shows included rebroadcasts of his Pop Chronicles, an old-time radio hour (called "The Golden Age of Radio" or "The Great American Broadcast"), Mystery Theater, The Comedy Hour, and The Great LPs. While working there he also produced and broadcast, beginning in 1972, The Pop Chronicles 40s, about the popular music of the 1940s. He was succeeded in his on-air time slot at KSFO by Jerry Gordon.

=== Retirement ===
Gilland left KSFO in 1978 and returned to his native Texas. He edited and in 1994 published Pop Chronicles: the 40s as a four-cassette audiobook, which was rereleased later as The Big Band Chronicles. During his retirement he hosted a late night show on KREB in Houston and did some work for KIXC in Quanah. He died in 1998. In 2003, Gilliland's sister donated the Pop Chronicles tapes to the University of North Texas Music Library where they form The John Gilliland Collection. Later his 700 reel-to-reel tapes of various old radio shows was added.

== Discography ==
- 1968: An Album of Political Pornography, with Lew Irwin and The Credibility Gap (Blue Thumb)
- 1994: Pop Chronicles the 40s: The Lively Story of Pop Music in the 40s (Mind's Eye) ISBN 978-1-55935-147-8. OCLC 31611854.
