= KSDW =

Satellite of KWVE-FM, San Clemente
- Temecula, California; United States
- Broadcast area: Temecula, California / San Diego County
- Frequency: 88.9 MHz

Programming
- Format: Christian radio

Ownership
- Owner: Calvary Chapel Costa Mesa; (Calvary Chapel of Costa Mesa, Inc.)
- Sister stations: KWVE-FM

History
- First air date: November 5, 1979 as KRTM
- Former call signs: KRTM (1979–1984); KRRR (1984–1989); KRTM (1989–2010)
- Call sign meaning: San Diego's Wave of Living Water (reference to sister station KWVE-FM)

Technical information
- Licensing authority: FCC
- Facility ID: 52141
- Class: B
- ERP: 270 watts
- HAAT: 924 meters (3,031 ft)
- Transmitter coordinates: 33°22′10″N 116°56′11″W
- Translators: 96.1 K241CH (San Diego); 96.9 K245AI (San Pasqual)

Links
- Public license information: Public file; LMS
- Webcast: Listen Live
- Website: ksdwradio.com

KSDW (88.9 FM) is a Christian radio station licensed to Temecula, California, and serving the Temecula Valley and San Diego County. The station is owned and operated by Calvary Chapel Costa Mesa, and studios are co-located in Santa Ana with sister station KWVE-FM.

KSDW's format consists mainly of contemporary worship music but also features Bible teaching programs of churches in the Temecula Valley, greater San Diego, and throughout the nation.
