= Studio Briefing =

Entertainment industry newsletter

Studio Briefing is an entertainment industry newsletter edited and published by Lew Irwin. Studio Briefing began "as a fax-only subscription service in 1992, [and] went online the following year". It had previously been syndicated through the Newshare corp. Studio Briefing also runs a blog at StudioBriefing.net.
