= Ted Quillin =

American radio personality for KFWB

- Born: Theodore Quillin; February 17, 1930; Oklahoma City
- Died: April 20, 2011 (aged 81); Las Vegas
- Presenting career
- Stations: KFWB and KRLA in Hollywood
- Country: United States

Theodore Quillin (born February 17, 1930, in Oklahoma City – April 20, 2011) was an American radio personality who worked at pioneering Top 40 station KFWB.

He was one of the original "Seven Swingin' Gentlemen" who brought rock and roll into its first major market in 1958 at KFWB in Hollywood. He was in radio for over 60 years and was honored by the Nevada Broadcasters in 2005, when he was inducted into their Hall of Fame.

== Early life and radio career ==
Born in Oklahoma City, Quillin moved to El Paso, Texas where he finished high school and attended the Texas College of Mines and Metallurgy (now the University of Texas at El Paso). During this time, while still in high school Ted started his broadcast career at KEPO, an ABC station in El Paso. He started as a ‘gofer’ on a morning show from 6 to 7 AM, before he went to school. He graduated to staff announcer. After that he took a job in Corpus Christi, Texas, at KSIX. The program director from KXYZ in Houston heard him and hired him as a staff announcer. From there he went to WACO in Waco, Texas. Ted moved to KELP-El Paso, which was a Gordon McLendon station, doing top 40. This is where he met Chuck Blore and when Chuck got the call to Hollywood, he took Ted with him and Ted became one of the original "Seven Swingin’ Gentlemen", who took Rock and Roll into its first major market, at KFWB. His listeners became known as the "Quiverin' Quillin Clan."

== Later radio career ==
Quillin's years in radio include: KFWB–Hollywood, 1958–61; KRLA–Pasadena, 1962–64; KORK–Las Vegas, 1964–66, KFI–Los Angeles, 1969; KFOX–Long Beach 1969–71; XPRS-1972, and, finally, back to KORK in 1972, when he became a permanent resident of Las Vegas. Ted was at KORK for several years and later opened an advertising agency in the city. During the days at his agency, he did months and sometime years of DJ work on several local radio stations, including KLAV. People in broadcasting in Vegas knew Ted and would call him when they got in a ‘pinch’ to fill in for them, and sometimes this ‘fill-in’ would last for a year or more. During this period, he taught a class on communications at Las Vegas City College.

Ted did a show for Armed Forces Radio & Television Network for many years and was heard on 530 radio stations worldwide. This show was broadcast while he was in Hollywood as well as after he moved permanently to Las Vegas. Years later the Armed Forces Network was re-broadcasting Quillin's shows on their radio stations.

In his later years Quillin still kept his hand in broadcasting with a Classic Country show which he did for KDSS in Ely, Nevada, and a show on the Internet on Rock-it Radio. Ted always signed off any of his radio programs with his trademark slogan “Blue Skies and Green Lights.” Quillin died April 20, 2011, in Las Vegas.

== Awards ==
Ted was rated #1 Personality Disc Jockey nationally, by the C. E. Hooper Audience Corp. while at KFWB. In 2005 Ted was inducted into the Broadcasters' Hall of Fame in Nevada. He received a standing ovation when he was called to accept his trophy. He was revered and respected by his peers. Don Imus spoke of him with admiration on his show.

== Fictional portrayals ==
Quillin was portrayed in the film La Bamba by Rick Dees. During the late 1950s he became something of a mentor and advisor to the young Ritchie Valens.
