= Pop Chronicles =

Radio documentaries on 1940s–60s popular music

The Pop Chronicles
- "The 'Pop Chronicles' Team" c. 1970. From left to right are John Gilliland, Mike Dorrough, Sie Holliday, Chester Coleman, and Thom Beck.
- Home station: KRLA
- Syndicates: Hot Air, Armed Forces Radio
- Created by: John Gilliland
- Produced by: Chester Coleman
- Narrated by: John Gilliland, Sie Holliday, Thom Beck
- Original release: 1969 – c. 1970
- No. of episodes: 55
- Other themes: The Chronicles of Pop by Len Chandler
- Website: digital.library.unt.edu/collections/JGPC

The Pop Chronicles are two radio documentary series which together "may constitute the most complete audio history of 1940s–60s popular music." They originally aired starting in 1969 and concluded about 1974. Both were produced by John Gilliland.

== The Pop Chronicles of the 1950s and 1960s ==
Inspired by the Monterey Pop Festival, the Pop Chronicles of the 1950s and 1960s originally was produced at KRLA 1110 and first aired on February 9, 1969. John Gilliland narrated the series along with Sie Holliday and Thom Beck (pictured). Also performing interviews were Dick LaPalm, Lew Irwin, Harry Shearer, Mike Masterson, and Richard Perry. The show's brief recurring theme song "The Chronicles of Pop" was written and performed by Len Chandler. The engineer and associate producer of the series was Chester Coleman.

KRLA 1110 originally broadcast an hour a week of the Pop Chronicles, which were later syndicated by "Hot Air" and broadcast on Armed Forces Radio. The photo above indicates that it was broadcast on KABC-FM sometime before that station became KLOS.

The University of North Texas Music Library made the Pop Chronicles available online since June 2010.

== The Pop Chronicles of the 1940s ==
Pop Chronicles the 40s
- Cover of the audiobook version
- Home station: KSFO
- Syndicates: AFRTS
- Created by: John Gilliland
- Narrated by: John Gilliland
- Original release: 1972 – c. 1974
- No. of episodes: 24
- Website: The Pop Chronicles Of The 1940s

The Pop Chronicles of the 1940s was produced by John Gilliland and broadcast on KSFO while he worked there beginning in 1972 for a total of 24 episodes. To promote the show, KSFO "had a 40's month celebration with a dance remote and a jitterbug contest at Union Square." Allan M. Newman of KSFO said of the show that Gilliland, "interviewed damn near everybody involved during those years. such as Bing Crosby, Jimmy Van Heusen, Johnny Mercer, Patty Andrews, Tex Beneke, etc. ... I think John has put together a true collector's item."

In 1972, Gilliland had produced and syndicated 12 episodes which covered the first half of the 1940s. He then asked his listeners to write to their stations if they wanted to hear the rest of the series. He would produce another 12 episodes to cover the rest of the 1940s.

This series was syndicated by Doug Andrews and broadcast on AFRTS. In 1973 MCA Records used the show to sell a nine-album set of music from the show, so the show could be offered for free to radio stations. But in 1974, RCA negotiated for the rights to the show.

In 1994, Gilliland released an edited version as the four cassette audiobook Pop Chronicles the 40's: The Lively Story of Pop Music in the 40's. This was later rereleased as The Big Band Chronicles.

After his death, Gilliand's sister donated the Pop Chronicles tapes to the University of North Texas Music Library where they form the John Gilliland Collection.

== See also ==
- The History of Rock and Roll, 21 February 1969 American radio documentary about rock and roll music
