= Lew Irwin =

Los Angeles-based journalist

Lew Irwin has been a Los Angeles–based journalist for more than 50 years. He was the original anchor/reporter at KABC-TV from 1957 to 1962 and the news director of Los Angeles radio stations KPOL, KRLA, KDAY, and KNX-FM. While at KRLA in the late 1960s, he created The Credibility Gap, a 15-minute news program, broadcast every three hours, that integrated topical satire and music with the news. He also has interviewed Presidents Harry Truman, John Kennedy, Lyndon Johnson, Dwight Eisenhower, and Ronald Reagan, as well as such show business personalities as The Beatles, the Rolling Stones, Frank Sinatra, David Bowie, Peter Sellers, Jack Nicholson, Dick Clark and Elvis Presley. He is the author of Sinatra, a Life Remembered, a coffee table book about Frank Sinatra and since 1992 has been the publisher/editor of the daily entertainment industry digest Studio Briefing.

== Career ==
Irwin owned a news production company that produced segments for several southern California radio stations. Then in 1968, KRLA 1110 hired him as their news director to form the Credibility Gap.

Irwin's autobiographical website wrote:

While ... an undergraduate at USC, he ... host[ed] News Today, a nationally syndicated radio program. ... For the next fifteen years, Irwin ... anchored television news programs or directed the news operations of leading radio stations. ... In 1968, he produced and hosted The Credibility Gap on Los Angeles radio station KRLA, which integrated topical satire and music with the news. ... Following that, Irwin produced and hosted more than a half dozen syndicated radio series, including, from 1972-1985, Earth News Radio. ... He currently is the publisher/editor of Studio Briefing.

== Discography ==
- 1968 – An Album of Political Pornography, with Lew Irwin and the Credibility Gap (Blue Thumb) OCLC 28851426

== Bibliography ==
- Sinatra: A Life Remembered, Courage Books, 1997. ISBN 978-0-7624-0397-4. OCLC 299191131
- Sinatra: The Pictorial Biography, Courage Books, 1995. ISBN 978-1-56138-453-2.
- Sinatra: A Life in Music, Castle Communications, 1995. ISBN 978-1-56799-221-2.
- Deadly Times: The 1910 Bombing of the Los Angeles Times And America's Forgotten Decade of Terror. ISBN 9781493006496. OCLC 1041584530.
