= KWVE (AM) =

Simulcasting KWVE-FM San Clemente
- Pasadena, California; United States
- Broadcast area: Greater Los Angeles
- Frequency: 1110 kHz
- Branding: K-Wave 107.9 FM & 1110 AM

Programming
- Language: English
- Format: Christian talk and teaching

Ownership
- Owner: Calvary Chapel Costa Mesa; (Calvary Chapel of Costa Mesa, Inc.)
- Sister stations: KWVE-FM; KSDW

History
- First air date: 1942; 84 years ago
- Former call signs: KPAS (1942–1945); KXLA (1945–1959); KRLA (1959–2000); KSPN (2000–2003); KDIS (2003–2017); KRDC (2017–2023)
- Call sign meaning: K-Wave

Technical information
- Licensing authority: FCC
- Facility ID: 25076
- Class: B
- Power: 50,000 watts (day); 20,000 watts (night)
- Transmitter coordinates: 34°6′50″N 117°59′54.2″W
- Translator: 99.1 K256CX (Pasadena)

Links
- Public license information: Public file; LMS
- Webcast: Listen Live
- Website: www.kwave.com

KWVE (1110 kHz) is a commercial AM radio station licensed to Pasadena, California, serving Greater Los Angeles as a simulcast of Christian talk and teaching station KWVE-FM. The station is operated by Calvary Chapel Costa Mesa, who acquired the station on September 8, 2023.

KWVE transmits with 50,000 watts daytime and 20,000 watts nighttime, and uses a directional antenna at all times. It broadcast in the HD Radio (hybrid) format until late 2014 when all Radio Disney affiliates were sold except for the Los Angeles station which returned to analog transmissions. KWVE is still licensed for digital (HD) operation.

For 18 years, under the ownership of The Walt Disney Company, AM 1110 was the flagship station for Radio Disney, carrying the main service from 2003 to 2017, as KDIS, then Radio Disney Country from 2017 to its late 2020 shutdown as KRDC. Until September 8, 2023, KRDC had simulcast former sister station KSPN, the Los Angeles market's primary ESPN Radio affiliate, as the last station to be operated by Disney.

== History ==
The station initially signed on as KPAS in 1942, a station featuring popular music. J. Frank Burke (Publisher-Editor) had owned the Santa Ana Register, buying in 1927, selling in 1935, and was the original KPAS licensee. Loyal Kletzein King (Business Manager) was J. Frank Burke's accountant and married to his daughter, Mary Burke King (Associate Editor). J. Frank Burke sold to William Dumm in 1945, who sold to Loyal King two years later. J. Frank Burke owned both KFVD and KPAS, and the FCC later gave notice to dispose of one of the stations.

The Lamplighter Jazz Sessions were KPAS half-hour broadcasts from late in 1944 to early 1947, sponsored by the Coast Guard and was hosted by jazz writer Ted Yerxa, Lamplighter columnist for The Los Angeles Daily News.

In 1945, it took the call sign KXLA, becoming one of the earliest full-time country music stations. On-air personalities included Jim Hawthorne, Bob Wills, Tennessee Ernie Ford, and Stan Freberg. The station originally broadcast from its El Monte transmitter site, near Santa Anita Avenue and the Pomona Freeway, in the vicinity of the Peck Road exit.

=== KRLA (1959–2000) ===
The station became KRLA, "The Big 11-10", on September 1, 1959, and quickly became one of the top radio stations in the Los Angeles area. The on-air personalities included Dave Hull (The Hullabalooer), Emperor Bob Hudson, Ted Quillin, Rebel Foster, Jimmy Rabbitt, Casey Kasem, Bob Eubanks, Dick Biondi, Sam Riddle, Dick Moreland, Jimmy O'Neill, Wink Martindale, Johnny Hayes and Sie Holliday. In 1968, Lew Irwin became news director in order to create The Credibility Gap, which broadcast topical comedy along with the news. In 1969, John Gilliland debuted the Pop Chronicles music documentary. KHJ countered with "The History of Rock and Roll", a 48-hour “rockumentary” that chronicled the evolution of Rock and Roll, on Friday February 21, 1969, at noon, the beginning of a Washington’s Birthday holiday weekend. The 1969 film Model Shop featured a radio newscast by KRLA newsman Ralph Thompson. During the 1960s, the KRLA studio was in an old carriage house just off the parking lot of the old Huntington Sheraton Hotel on Oak Knoll Drive in Pasadena, making it possible to drop by and watch the on-air DJ do his show, those who did were called "porch people" by the staff. When Dave Hull was fired, "Porch people" and other listeners staged a sit-in. When the station switched to oldies, KRLA was noted for its prominence in Southern California Chicano culture. One of the highlights of this station was the Big 11 Countdown Show hosted by Johnny Hayes, with stories and facts about the songs and the artists, as well as the historical events that were going on at that time. The show also included a trivia question that Hayes asked for people to call in with their answer in order to win a prize. Each day's show counted down the top 11 songs from that date in a previous year as well as a few extras.

In 1962, the Federal Communications Commission suspended KRLA's license for airing fraudulent contests. It only remained on the air because the FCC transferred the license to Oak Knoll Broadcasting, with the profits used to fund local non-commercial television station [KCET]. This arrangement was intended to be temporary until a new permanent licensee could be found; however, the number of applications received forced comparative hearings that lasted until 1979.

Monterey International Pop Festival was broadcast live on KRLA from the Monterey Fairgrounds.

Art Laboe was brought in to program KRLA in at the beginning of 1977 by Oak Knoll and the format changed from an automated "middle of the road" to oldies.

Under its new owners (KRLA, Incorporated, which sold it to group owner Greater Media not long after acquiring the license) the station evolved to an adult contemporary format, and returned to a focus on oldies by 1983, and the station began broadcasting in AM stereo using the Kahn-Hazeltine system. It dropped current music in 1984, electing to play the oldies of the late 1950s, 1960s, and 1970s.

By 1994, KRLA leaned towards an urban oldies format.

On February 25, 1997, CBS Radio announced that it would trade WMMR in Philadelphia, and WOAZ and WBOS in Boston to Greater Media in exchange for KRLA and sister station KLSX, as part of its acquisition of Infinity Broadcasting Corporation. The swap was completed on August 22.

At noon on November 30, 1998, KRLA abandoned music entirely and went all talk. As a talk radio station, KRLA featured many cast-offs from KABC, such as Michael Jackson and Ken Minyard, as well as Don Imus, Dr. Toni Grant, G. Gordon Liddy, Ron Barr's Sports Byline USA, and Ed Tyll. The station also aired play-by-play of the Kings and Angels.

=== KSPN (2000–2002) ===
In 2000, Infinity sold KRLA (alongside KRAK in Sacramento) to the Burbank-based Walt Disney Company due to ownership limits. On December 1, the station became the ESPN Radio outlet for the Los Angeles market (as KSPN). Disney completed the acquisition on March 1, 2001.

=== KDIS (2003–2017) ===
AM 710 and 1110 swapped formats on January 1, 2003, with the sports format moving to 710, and Radio Disney affiliation moving to 1110 (a change made reportedly because the 1110 signal could not be heard in Orange County at night, when most Anaheim Angels games are played). In 2006, KDIS stopped broadcasting in AM stereo

In May 2014, Mediabase moved KDIS to the contemporary hit radio panel, although Radio Disney was still considered a children's radio station.

On August 13, it was revealed that all of Radio Disney's remaining stations, excluding KDIS, were to be sold in an effort to focus on digital distribution of the Radio Disney network. KDIS was retained to serve as the originator of Radio Disney's programming, and its operations were assumed by the network's national staff.

=== KRDC (2017–2023) ===
Former KRDC logo for Radio Disney Country.

On June 9, 2017, KDIS changed its call sign to KRDC and flipped to a country format as "Radio Disney Country", becoming the first terrestrial radio station carrying the formerly online-only platform. KRDC also added a translator, 99.1 K256CX, which broadcasts from KRDC's transmitter in Irwindale. The first song on "Radio Disney Country" on 1110 AM was "Legends" by Kelsea Ballerini. The children's radio/contemporary hit radio hybrid continued in the market on KRTH's HD2 subchannel until Entercom's deal with Radio Disney expired at the end of May 2018.

On December 3, 2020, Disney announced that Radio Disney and Radio Disney Country would be shut down in the first quarter of 2021. As part of the process, KRDC was put up for sale.

Radio Disney Country ceased operations at noon on December 31, 2020, with the station switching back to the main Radio Disney feed until its shutdown, while the network was slated to shut down in the first quarter of 2021, the station's AM feed continued to play an automated playlist of songs from throughout Radio Disney’s history until April 14, 2021. The final song broadcast was Natasha Bedingfield's "Unwritten". The station’s feed was previously available on iHeartRadio until it was removed sometime in March 2021.

Following the end of the Radio Disney feed, KRDC simulcasted KSPN, the ESPN Radio affiliate for Los Angeles, pending a station sale. KRDC also served as an overflow station for several sports teams in the Los Angeles area. The station aired Los Angeles Lakers broadcasts in the event that KSPN aired a Los Angeles Rams game and Los Angeles FC matches when KSPN aired the Lakers, Rams, or Angels. The station formerly aired Anaheim Ducks games in the event that KLAA broadcast a Los Angeles Angels game until the end of the 2021–22 NHL season; the following season, Ducks radio broadcasts moved to Ducks Stream, an online station available via TuneIn.

On June 12, 2023, Disney filed to sell KRDC to Calvary Chapel Costa Mesa, owner of KWVE-FM and KSDW, for $5 million. The sale, which included KRDC's low-power FM translator in Pasadena, would complete Disney's exit from radio station ownership.

=== KWVE (2023–present) ===
In preparation for the impending closure of the sale to Calvary Chapel, The Walt Disney Company filed to change KRDC's callsign to KWVE on August 31, 2023. On September 8, the sale had closed, completing ABC/Disney's departure from broadcast radio after 96 years, dating back to the founding of NBC's Blue Network. KRDC switched from the KSPN simulcast to another simulcast, this time of San Clemente-licensed Christian talk and teaching-formatted KWVE-FM (107.9). The switch gives the KWVE-FM signal enhanced coverage in the northern and western sections of the Los Angeles metro area, as far north as Ventura County. The main FM signal only operates at 530 watts, transmits from Santiago Peak near Rancho Santa Margarita and is directed away from the northwest, making it hard to hear in Los Angeles proper. The addition of the AM signal creates a strong combined signal with approximately 70 percent overlap. The change to the KWVE call sign took place on September 12.

== Transmitter ==
In 1987, KRLA moved its transmitter site from South El Monte to Irwindale, where a similar antenna array was installed. During the 1990s, KRLA was authorized to increase nighttime power from 10,000 to 20,000 watts. When the power increase went into effect, KRLA started broadcasting from the new transmitter site in Irwindale. This is a few miles north of the old El Monte site.

The El Monte transmitter building still stands as a shell. The entire inside is burned out; however, there are still clues to its historic past, namely the first incarnation of its directional antenna arrays (four in-line 135-degree towers, one days, four nights), the second incarnation (four 135-degree towers in a parallelogram, days and a 90-, two 135-, and a 180-degree towers, nights), and the last incarnation, with seven total towers, four days and four nights, with one tower in common, days and nights). There are numerous ducts to keep the equipment cool and an underground channel to divert the cooling water for the transmitters. A well nearby supplied the water. Still visible is the wooden archway where the transmission cables gently bent toward underground conduits running to the transmission towers in the nearby field. All that remains of these towers are the concrete pylons, all aligned as described.

The present Irwindale site includes five 135-degree towers, two days and four nights, with one in common. The significantly northern location, relative to the old El Monte site, allows the large "Inland Empire" to be served with 50,000 watts and only two towers, not four, days, and the greater Los Angeles metro to be served with 20,000 watts and four towers, nights.

== K256CX ==
Call sign	Frequency	City of license	FID	ERP (W)	HAAT	Class	Transmitter coordinates	FCC info
K256CX	99.1 FM	Pasadena, California	141730	250 horizontal	−99 m (−325 ft)	D	34°06′50.0″N 117°59′53.2″W	LMS

K256CX is a broadcast translator licensed to Pasadena. The transmitter is located in Irwindale. The station went on the air June 9, 2017, and rebroadcasts KWVE on 99.1 MHz.

=== History ===
The Federal Communications Commission (FCC) granted an original construction permit on December 6, 2013, to build an FM translator (K293BZ, now K256CX) licensed in Beaumont, California, and located in the 106.5 MHz frequency, which would rebroadcast KWVE-FM in San Clemente.

On October 18, 2016, KDIS' licensee ABC Radio Los Angeles Assets agreed to acquire from the Calvary Chapel Costa Mesa the permit with the intention to rebroadcast the AM station for $45,000. On November 8, the FCC, as part of the AM revitalization program, granted a modification to move the transmitter location to Irwindale (although the translator will maintain Beaumont as its license city) and change the frequency to 99.1. The transaction was closed on February 7, 2017.

Following the launch of K256CX and KDIS' switch to Radio Disney Country as KRDC on June 9, 2017, Mount Wilson FM Broadcasters, owner of existing country music station KKGO, said in a statement welcoming the station that the translator would mainly cover the San Gabriel Valley and that the FCC had also authorized another station on 99.1 MHz in Long Beach.
