= Don Sherwood (DJ) =

American DJ

Don Sherwood (September 7, 1925 – November 6, 1983) was an American radio personality. He was a San Francisco, California, disc jockey during the 1950s and 1960s. Billed as "The World's Greatest Disc Jockey," Sherwood spent most of his career hosting a 6-9 a.m. weekday program on KSFO in San Francisco (560 kHz, 5000 watts), which was then owned by the singing cowboy actor Gene Autry.

== Biography ==
Born Daniel Sherwood Cohelan in San Francisco, Sherwood served briefly in the Canadian Armoured Corps (lying about his real age — 16), then enrolled in a radio class at Samuel Gompers School. He then joined the Merchant Marine. When he returned to San Francisco in 1944, his deep, resonant voice led to a job as announcer at KFRC, when Sherwood was only 19 years old. The job ended; and Sherwood was unemployed until he was hired by KQW, which was renamed KCBS in 1949, serving as an announcer and playing recordings. After being fired by KCBS on May 29, 1949, Sherwood worked at KROW in Oakland, California. Then, in 1953, he was hired by KSFO and remained there for three years. In 1956, he worked at KYA, then returned to KSFO the following year. He remained primarily at KSFO until 1969.

At KSFO, Sherwood did more than play recordings on his broadcasts; he made fun of the commercials, used sound effects (with the help of a talented engineer named Charlie Smith), occasionally imitated popular singers, and presented a number of regular comic features including "Just Plain Rosita," in which he pretended to translate the story of a Spanish language radio soap opera (actually dialog from a Spanish-language instructional record). He also was the star of a long-running spoof on super heroes called "Super Frog," which relied on music and sound effects. He had a number of sidekicks over the years, including newsman Aaron Edwards (who later was a television news reporter) and fellow disc jockey Carter B. Smith (later heard on KNBR).

During Sherwood's KSFO programs, Hap Harper provided some of the Bay Area's first traffic reports (from a fixed wing airplane). On one memorable 1960 broadcast (preserved on tape by http://bayarearadio.org), comedian Bill Dana surprised Sherwood by trying to do the reports from Harper's plane. Whenever Sherwood did play recordings, he deliberately avoided rock music, which he detested; instead, he played his favorite "easy listening" singers such as Wayne Newton, Johnny Mathis, Vic Damone, and Carmen McRae. Sherwood would sign off with, "Out of the mud grows the lotus."

For some reason, Sherwood often tampered with the Berkeley Farms dairy products commercials. The prerecorded announcement included a final line "Farms in Berkeley?" followed by the mooing of a cow. Berkeley Farms had hired cartoon voice expert Mel Blanc to do the cow voice. However, Sherwood would insert a pause after the question, then add something else (often totally unrelated to the commercial), before playing the cow sound effect, which was often distorted. He also would tamper with a familiar cigarette commercial, known for the line "outstanding...and they are mild," by interrupting the words with his own comments or a recording that had nothing to do with the product. Reportedly, advertisers didn't mind Sherwood's actions because it actually called greater attention to their products.

Beginning January 15, 1955, Sherwood also hosted a late night local show, titled "San Francisco Tonight," on KGO-TV (Channel 7) in San Francisco. He even had his own orchestra. The station, owned and operated by ABC (since its debut in May 1949), wanted Sherwood simply to interview visiting entertainers and other celebrities and to avoid politics or other controversial subjects. However, Sherwood became concerned about the federal government's treatment of the Navajo tribe. Also beginning on January 15, 1955, Don hosted a one half hour television show called "The Belfast Pop Club" with Bill Anderson until June 13, 1955.

In 1957, management warned Sherwood not to discuss his concerns on the program and, when he went ahead anyway, they cut off his program and promptly fired him.

Later, when KTVU (Channel 2) in Oakland, California began broadcasting from studios in Jack London Square (in 1958), they invited Sherwood to host a similar program on their station. Although Sherwood was given considerably more freedom, he soon grew tired of the demands of hosting a late night telecast and still getting up early the next morning to do his morning broadcast on KSFO. Sherwood was often late for his KSFO broadcasts or did not show up at all, forcing KSFO to use Aaron Edwards, Carter Smith, or whoever else was available on short notice.

Sherwood had left the San Francisco Bay Area in 1957 to be considered as a possible NBC television host in Chicago, only to become homesick and return to San Francisco. He also moved to Honolulu and worked as an announcer there, before again deciding to return to the Bay Area. His final stint at KSFO was in 1975. Listeners generally thought he had lost much of his humor and creative imagination in his later broadcasts.

Worsening health led him to spend much of his later years traveling or on a house boat in Sausalito, California. He did appear on KGO Radio with talk show host Owen Spann late in his life and, despite poor health, still displayed considerable wit and wisdom.

Emphysema, probably caused by his chain smoking, shortened his career and life.

His life has been chronicled in The Life and Times of the World's Greatest Disc Jockey by Laurie Harper, the wife of former Sherwood colleague Hap Harper (who did KSFO's traffic reports), published in 1989 by Prima Publishing & Communications, Rocklin, California.

== Sherwood's Stations ==
KFRC, where Sherwood began his broadcasting career (as an announcer), later became a rock music FM outlet. It was discontinued in 2008 and its last location on the dial, 106.9, began broadcasting KCBS's programming. KCBS, where Sherwood continued his career, is a news and information station, still owned by CBS. KROW in Oakland was purchased by Gordon McLendon in 1959, who changed it to an "easy listening" station known as KABL; in 2004 it became a rock station known as KQKE. KSFO, where Sherwood spent much of his career, is now an all-talk station with a primarily conservative agenda. KYA, where he broadcast for a year, was renamed KOIT. KGO-TV is still owned by ABC, a Disney subsidiary, while KTVU is now a Fox owned-and-operated station.
