= KWVE-FM =

Radio station in San Clemente, California, United States

- San Clemente, California; United States
- Broadcast area: Orange County; Inland Empire; Northern San Diego County
- Frequency: 107.9 MHz (HD Radio)
- Branding: K-Wave 107.9 FM & 1110 AM

Programming
- Format: Christian radio
- Subchannels: HD2: Spanish Christian; HD3: Mandarin Christian; HD4: Vietnamese Christian

Ownership
- Owner: Calvary Chapel Costa Mesa; (Calvary Chapel of Costa Mesa, Inc.)
- Sister stations: KWVE, KSDW, KWTH

History
- First air date: November 16, 1971
- Former call signs: KAPX (1971–1977)
- Call sign meaning: "K-Wave"

Technical information
- Licensing authority: FCC
- Facility ID: 8410
- Class: B
- ERP: 530 watts
- HAAT: 1,156 meters (3,793 ft)
- Transmitter coordinates: 33°42′40.00″N 117°31′55.00″W
- Repeater: 1110 KWVE (Pasadena)

Links
- Public license information: Public file; LMS
- Webcast: Listen live
- Website: kwave.com

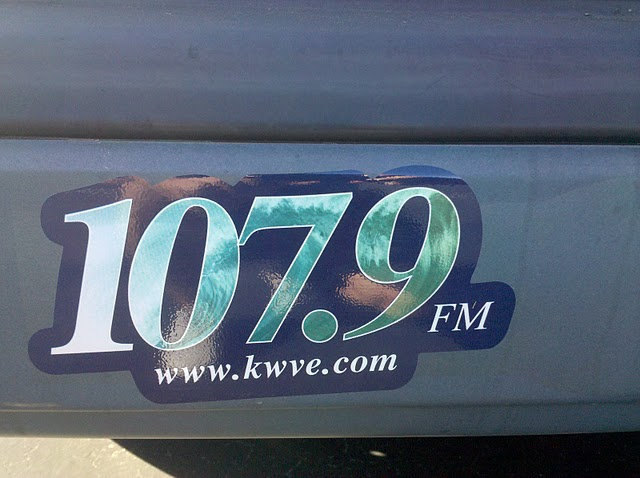
A previous branding of the station as seen on a bumper sticker.

KWVE-FM (107.9 FM, "K-Wave") is a commercial radio station licensed to San Clemente, California, United States, and serving Orange County, the Inland Empire and Northern San Diego County. Owned by Calvary Chapel Costa Mesa, it airs a Christian format with studios in the church-owned KWAVE Building on West MacArthur Boulevard in Santa Ana.

KWVE-FM's transmitter is sited atop Santiago Peak in Rancho Santa Margarita. KWVE is simulcast on KWVE (1110 AM) within the Greater Los Angeles area; most KWVE programming is also heard on KSDW (88.9 FM) in Temecula.

== History ==
=== MOR and beautiful music ===
The El Camino Broadcasting Corporation received a construction permit to build a new FM station at 107.9 MHz. The station signed on the air on November 16, 1971, as KAPX, airing a middle of the road format.

Radio Apex bought KAPX in November 1977 and changed its call sign to KWVE, becoming a beautiful music station known as K-Wave. It played quarter-hour sweeps of mostly instrumental music with some soft vocals. By the early 1980s, KWVE was a commercial adult contemporary music station. It was getting poor ratings, except in the evening drive slot when it played cutting-edge punk rock and new wave music which pulled high Arbitron numbers.

=== Christian radio ===
In 1982, KWVE sold the 7 p.m. to midnight timeslot to Calvary Chapel Costa Mesa. The church also bought time on KWVE on Sundays from 5 a.m. to noon. In 1984, the station fired most of its disc jockeys and went to automated music programming. In 1985, Calvary Chapel bought the station. The Calvary offer beat two competing bidders because it was an all-cash offer.

The church took over on April 15, 1985. Calvary Chapel expanded the Christian programming to its current 24-hour format while retaining the KWVE call sign and K-Wave brand. KWVE-FM advertises itself as "The Wave of Living Water", in reference to its wave-themed moniker and to the New Testament phrase "living water", a term for salvation through Jesus Christ.

=== KWVE call letters ===
For most of its existence, the station's call sign was simply KWVE, without the FM suffix. That changed in 2009 when Calvary Chapel purchased a defunct Christian AM radio station, KGDP in Oildale, California, and renamed it KWVE (now KGSV), simulcasting the FM signal into the Bakersfield radio market. As a result, the original KWVE was legally renamed KWVE-FM.

KWVE-FM is sometimes confused with a similarly named secular smooth adult contemporary radio station in Los Angeles, KTWV 94.7 FM. That station is known as "94.7 The Wave" and owned by Audacy. Then-owner Metromedia converted rock-formatted KMET to KTWV and "The Wave" on February 14, 1987, nearly two years after the launch of KWVE-FM's current Christian format. Both stations emphasize their FM frequencies to distinguish themselves from each other. KWVE-FM keeps on hand in its broadcast booth KTWV's request line and business numbers as a courtesy to listeners mistakenly calling into the wrong station.

=== 25th anniversary ===
On April 15 and 16, 2010, Calvary Chapel Costa Mesa celebrated the 25th anniversary of its purchase of KWVE-FM and the station's Christian talk and music format with two evening concerts in the church sanctuary. The concerts featured Love Song, a Christian rock band founded at Calvary Chapel and popular during the Jesus Movement of the early 1970s, and messages from senior pastor Chuck Smith.

=== Website attacked by hackers ===
Beginning on October 17, 2010, visitors to KWVE-FM's website began complaining on the station's Facebook fan page that they could not access either the home page or the Flash Player live stream. The station replied that the web server experienced a hacker attack and the entire site had to be taken down while they cleared the hardware of malignant code and rebuilt the site "from the ground up". As of November 1 the site and live stream were back in operation.

=== Calvary Chapel Music Channel ===
On August 7, 2011, KWVE-FM announced on its website and Facebook page the creation of the Calvary Chapel Music Channel, a commercial-free iTunes channel streaming the station's music 24 hours a day.

=== Emergency Alert System ===
KWVE-FM was the Local Primary station of the Emergency Alert System (EAS) for Orange County until 2023. All radio stations and cable systems in the area must relay emergency information and required monthly tests from KWVE-FM, when activated.

On September 15, 2009, the Federal Communications Commission fined Calvary Chapel $5,000 for a botched EAS test on October 19, 2008. On that date, the station conducted a Required Monthly Test (RMT) by mistake, instead of the scheduled Required Weekly Test. The operator aborted the test midway through, leading the station to fail to broadcast a code to indicate the end of the test, causing all stations and cable systems in the area to broadcast KWVE-FM's programming until those stations took their equipment offline or their EAS equipment had timed out (after two minutes).

After the fine was levied, many state broadcast associations in the United States submitted a joint letter to the FCC, protesting against the fine, saying that the FCC could have handled the matter better. On November 13, 2009, the FCC rescinded its fine against KWVE-FM, but had still admonished the station for broadcasting an unauthorized RMT, as well as omitting the code to end the test.

On September 21, 2017, a glitch during a test conducted by KWVE caused the station to accidentally omit the end-of-message tone, which caused portions of Chuck Swindoll's Insight for Living program to accidentally be relayed to local cable providers. In the audio relayed, Swindoll was heard quoting a Biblical verse, 2 Timothy 3:1, and stating that "extremely violent times" would come, which led viewers hearing the audio out of context to believe that it had been hacked to inform of an impending apocalypse.

In 2023, KWVE-FM ceased its role as the LP-1 for Orange County.

== Programming ==
KWVE-FM airs talk and teaching programs, some hosted by Calvary Chapel pastors, some from national religious leaders. Two hours of Christian-oriented children's programming airs on Saturday mornings.

=== The K-Wave Radio Network ===
K-Wave operates several other feeds in the Southwestern United States.

- KWVE (1110 AM) in Pasadena (Greater Los Angeles)
- KSDW (88.9 FM) in Temecula (Northern San Diego County)
- K245AI (96.9 FM) in San Pasqual, California (Central San Diego County)

Together they create at least secondary coverage to almost all of Southern California, from San Diego to Riverside and San Bernardino counties.

The church acquired several of these stations on August 11, 2011. They were previously owned and programmed by other ministries affiliated with the Calvary Chapel fellowship of churches.

Calvary Chapel entered an agreement with The Walt Disney Company to acquire KRDC in June 2023. The sale closed on September 8 of that year, and the AM signal switched to a simulcast of KWVE-FM. The AM signal gives KWVE enhanced coverage in the northern and western areas of the Los Angeles area, including Los Angeles proper, and as far north as Ventura County, where the main signal on 107.9 FM is weak. An application to change the call sign of the AM station to KWVE was granted on September 12.
