= KZTR =

KZTR may refer to:

- KZTR-LP, a low-power radio station (103.5 FM) licensed to serve Yakima, Washington, United States
- KBXT, a radio station (101.9 FM) licensed to serve Wixon Valley, Texas, United States, which held the call sign KZTR from 1996 to 2007
- KUNX, a radio station (1400 AM) licensed to serve Santa Paula, California, United States, which held the call sign KZTR from 1989 to 1991
- KCAQ, a radio station (95.9 FM) licensed to serve Camarillo, California, which held the call sign KZTR or KZTR-FM until 1991
