= KPSI =

KPSI may refer to:

- KPSI-FM, a radio station (100.5 FM) licensed to Palm Springs, California, United States
- KKGX, a radio station (920 AM) licensed to Palm Springs, California, United States, which held the call sign KPSI from 1997 to 2017
- KCOD, a defunct radio station (1450 AM) formerly licensed to Palm Springs, California, United States, which held the call sign KPSI from 1971 to 1997
- Knot density: knots per square inch
