= KMLA =

- El Rio, California; United States
- Broadcast area: Oxnard-Ventura, California
- Frequency: 103.7 MHz
- Branding: La M 103.7 FM

Programming
- Language: Spanish
- Format: Regional Mexican

Ownership
- Owner: Gold Coast Radio, LLC
- Sister stations: KMLM-FM

History
- First air date: October 1996

Technical information
- Licensing authority: FCC
- Facility ID: 55273
- Class: A
- ERP: 1,000 watts
- HAAT: 245 meters (804 ft)
- Transmitter coordinates: 34°18′10″N 119°13′41″W

Links
- Public license information: Public file; LMS
- Webcast: Listen live
- Website: lam1037.com

KMLA (103.7 FM, "La M 103.7") is a commercial radio station licensed to El Rio, California, United States, and serves the Oxnard-Ventura, California area. The station broadcasts a regional Mexican music format. KMLA is owned by Gold Coast Radio, LLC.

== History ==
KMLA first signed on in October 1996. Owner Clayton Corp. sold the station to Gold Coast Radio LLC for $600,000 the following month; the transaction was consummated December 6.

On October 30, 2008, KMLA owner Gold Coast Radio faced rival radio company Lazer Broadcasting in Ventura County Superior Court, suing for unspecified damages. Gold Coast accused the defendant of interfering with its advertisers and customers to harm its business, beginning with the near-cancellation of a 2007 concert hosted by KMLA. Lazer filed a countercomplaint requesting an injunction to stop Gold Coast from claiming that KMLA is the number-one rated station in Ventura County, citing Arbitron ratings reports to the contrary. On November 6, a jury awarded $553,000 in damages to Gold Coast Radio and promoter Universo Musical. However, on November 20, Superior Court judge Henry Walsh agreed with Lazer's counterclaim, granting the injunction prohibiting Gold Coast from making false and misleading claims of having the top-rated station. On January 7, 2009, Walsh set aside the jury award and ordered a retrial, citing insufficient evidence presented by the plaintiffs; the second jury granted Gold Coast and Universo Musical a smaller award of $99,800 on August 28.

On July 1, 2016 at midnight, Gold Coast Radio began operating KURQ in Grover Beach, California under a local marketing agreement with El Dorado Broadcasters, dropping the pre-existing modern rock format and simulcasting KMLA. In October, Gold Coast purchased KURQ from El Dorado for $600,000; that station is now known by the call letters KMLM-FM.

KMLA owner Gold Coast Radio LLC is not to be confused with, nor is affiliated with, Gold Coast Broadcasting LLC, a competing radio broadcasting company based in Ventura, California. Both companies own and operate stations in the Oxnard-Ventura market, including at least one each broadcasting in Spanish (Gold Coast Broadcasting's KVEN and KUNX).

== Programming ==
KMLA's morning show, El Nuevo Show De La M, is hosted by DON SOLOVINO & EVELYN CORREA "LA MUNEQUITA" Y GABRIEL REYES . The show features top-40 regional Mexican music, news, humorous commentary on current events, and call-in contests. As an hour-long extension of the morning show, Las Movidas de La M consists of upbeat, danceable selections from tropical, cumbia, and merengue artists. Middays, Las Viejas del Recuerdo ("The Oldies from the Past") host Chava Vaca plays popular Mexican music from the 1970s, 1980s, and 1990s. Other programs include Las Canciones Más Solicitadas del Día, consisting of each day's most requested songs, and the love-song show Sentimiento de Amor.

== On-air personalities ==
- Evelyn Correa "La Munequita De La M"
- Gabriel reyes
- Aluche "Don Solovino" Ballesteros
- Salvador "Chava" Vaca
- Gerardo Ceja
- el chicharron
- Sammy Garcia
