= KWIE (FM) =

Radio station in Barstow, California

Semi-satellite of KOCP, Oxnard, CA
- Barstow, California; United States
- Broadcast area: High Desert
- Frequency: 101.3 MHz
- Branding: Old School 101.3

Programming
- Format: Rhythmic oldies

Ownership
- Owner: LC Media; (Point Five LLC)
- Sister stations: KCAQ, KFYV, KHHT, KOCP, KOSJ, KQAV, KQIE, KXFM, KZLA

History
- First air date: June 16, 2016
- Former call signs: KCEQ (2015–2016)

Technical information
- Licensing authority: FCC
- Facility ID: 191522
- Class: A
- ERP: 2,250 watts
- HAAT: 165 meters (541 ft)
- Transmitter coordinates: 34.8561°N 117.0509°W

Links
- Public license information: Public file; LMS
- Website: oldschool1013.com

KWIE (101.3 FM; "Old School 101.3") is a commercial rhythmic oldies radio station in Barstow, California, broadcasting to the High Desert area. It is one of six other stations partially simulcasting KOCP (104.7) from Oxnard, with some diversions for local programming and requests.
