= KQIE =

Coordinates: 34.037°N 116.969°W

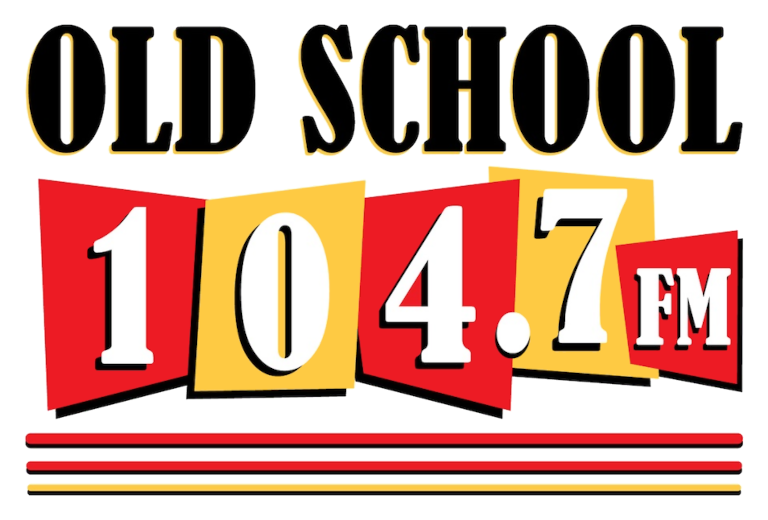
- Redlands, California; United States
- Broadcast area: Inland Empire
- Frequency: 104.7 MHz
- Branding: Old School 104.7 (pronounced "Old School One-Oh-Four-Seven")

Programming
- Format: Rhythmic oldies

Ownership
- Owner: Point Broadcasting; (LC Media LP)
- Sister stations: KCAQ, KFYV, KOCP, KOSJ, KQAV, KWIE, KXFM, KZLA

History
- First air date: February 10, 1963 (as KDES-FM)
- Former call signs: KDES-FM (1963–2010); KKIE (2010)
- Call sign meaning: Q104.7 Inland Empire (former branding)

Technical information
- Licensing authority: FCC
- Facility ID: 67354
- Class: A
- ERP: 1,350 watts, 4,100 watts (CP)
- HAAT: 213 meters (699 ft)

Links
- Public license information: Public file; LMS
- Webcast: Listen Live
- Website: oldschool1047ie.com

KQIE (104.7 FM, "Old School 104.7") is a commercial radio station that is licensed to Redlands, California and serves the Inland Empire area. The station is owned by LC Media and airs a rhythmic oldies music format. KQIE's studios are located in San Bernardino and the transmitter tower is in Yucaipa. The station is partially simulcast on sister station KOCP in Oxnard, California, also at 104.7 FM.

== History ==
=== KDES-FM (1963–2010) ===
The station began broadcasting as KDES-FM on February 10, 1963. Owned by George E. Cameron, it was originally licensed to Palm Springs, California and was the sister station of KDES (920 AM).

=== Q104.7 (2010–2015) ===
In January 2010, R&R Radio sold KDES-FM to LC Media, a subsidiary of Ventura-based Point Broadcasting, for $7.5 million. The new owner then changed the station's city of license to Redlands, California in the Riverside—San Bernardino radio market, thereby vacating the 104.7 FM frequency in Palm Springs. Upon relocating KDES-FM, LC Media changed its call letters to KKIE, then to KQIE, and took the station silent.

In September 2010, over Labor Day weekend, KQIE returned to the air with a rhythmic contemporary format based on that of sister station KCAQ in Oxnard. The new call sign reflected both its on-air moniker (Q104.7) and its new service area (the Inland Empire). The KDES-FM call sign remained in Palm Springs but was reassigned to the former KWXY-FM on 98.5 FM as part of a complex rearranging of stations in the market. During its five years as Q104.7, the station simulcast KCAQ but inserted localized advertising and promotions.

=== Old School 104.7 (2015–present) ===
On February 12, 2015, KQIE flipped to rhythmic oldies as "Old School 104.7", filling the format void in the Inland Empire left by the departure of KHHT in Los Angeles six days earlier when that station flipped to urban contemporary as KRRL (Real 92.3). On July 1, 2016, a signal swap in Ventura County enabled rhythmic oldies sister station KOCP, previously at 95.9 FM, to be heard at 104.7 FM as well. This in effect increased the reach of the "Old School" brand across the Greater Los Angeles area on a single frequency. On October 6, 2017, KOCP began streaming online.

== Transmission notes ==
In the San Gabriel Valley, low-power FM station KQEV-LP in Walnut broadcasts on 104.7 FM. Its signal contour is squeezed in between those of KOCP and KQIE, causing a small gap in transmission between both stations.
