= KDAI =

KDAI may refer to:

- KDAI (FM), a radio station (89.1 FM) licensed to Scottsbluff, Nebraska, United States
- KWIE (FM), a radio station (93.5 FM) licensed to Ontario, California, United States, which held the call sign KDAI from November 2004 to August 2007
