= KMLM-FM =

Coordinates: 35.360°N 120.656°W

- Grover Beach, California; United States
- Broadcast area: San Luis Obispo, California
- Frequency: 107.3 MHz
- Branding: La M 107.3

Programming
- Format: Regional Mexican (KMLA simulcast)

Ownership
- Owner: Gold Coast Radio, LLC
- Sister stations: KMLA

History
- First air date: July 4, 1984 (as KLOI)
- Former call signs: KLOI (1984–1987); KOSZ (1987–1989); KWCD (1989–1992); KIXT (1992); KIXT-FM (1992–1998); KQJZ (1998–2000); KURQ (2000–2016)
- Former frequencies: 107.1 MHz (1984–1987)

Technical information
- Licensing authority: FCC
- Facility ID: 54364
- Class: B
- ERP: 3,500 watts
- HAAT: 503 meters (1,650 ft)

Links
- Public license information: Public file; LMS
- Webcast: Listen Live
- Website: lam1037.com

KMLM-FM (107.3 FM) is a commercial radio station licensed to Grover Beach, California and broadcasting to the San Luis Obispo, California area. The station is owned by Gold Coast Radio LLC and airs a regional Mexican format.

== History ==
=== Early years (1984–2000) ===
The station first signed on July 4, 1984 on the 107.1 MHz frequency as KLOI. In 1987, the station changed its call sign to KOSZ and moved to 107.3 MHz. In November 1988, R&L Broadcasters sold KOSZ to P-B Broadcasting for $1.225 million. At the time of the sale, the station aired an adult contemporary music format. The new owner changed the call letters to KWCD the following year. KWCD went silent in November 1991. In April 1992, Westcom Communications, headed by Kathleen Phalen who originally purchased the station in 1988, sold KWCD back to R&L Broadcasters for $378,000. R&L installed a country music format and changed the call sign to KIXT (later adjusted to KIXT-FM). In June 1997, R&L sold KIXT-FM to Photosphere Broadcasting LLC for $900,000; this transaction brought the station under common ownership with KSLY-FM, KSTT-FM, and KXFM. After going silent in December 1997, the station re-emerged in early 1998 as smooth jazz-formatted KQJZ.

=== KURQ (2000–2016) ===
After two years with smooth jazz, KQJZ flipped to active rock in March 2000 with the branding "The Rock" and matching call letters KURQ. In September, Mondosphere Broadcasting Inc. sold 11 stations throughout Central California, including KURQ, plus a construction permit for a twelfth station, to Clear Channel Communications for $45 million.

Logo for KURQ as "New Rock 107.3" until June 2016.

Later in the 2000s, KURQ segued to modern rock as "New Rock 107.3". The station aired a variety of syndicated programming, including The Bob & Tom Show, Loveline, and Full Metal Jackie. In July 2007, KURQ was one of 16 stations in California and Arizona which Clear Channel sold to El Dorado Broadcasters for $40 million.

KURQ continuously promoted local rock and modeling talent. The station's playlist included such local rock artists from the San Luis Obispo area as Still Time, Entoven, Malo Culo, New Tomorrow, 3's & 9's, and Siko. The Punk Ass Bitches Show was a program featuring local punk rock acts. Each spring, the station released a CD titled SLO & Dysfunctional featuring local rock acts. Each fall, KURQ released a calendar, "The Ladies of The Central Coast"; the 2008 edition featured a variation, the "Hottest Bartenders on the Central Coast". KURQ's website featured "The Babe of The Day Page", which included assorted pictures of women wrestling in such substances as Jell-O, mashed potatoes, and K-Y Jelly.

=== KMLM-FM (2016–present) ===
On July 1, 2016 at midnight, KURQ dropped the modern rock format without warning and flipped to regional Mexican music branded as "La M 107.3", simulcasting sister station KMLA in Oxnard, California. This move resulted from a new local management agreement between El Dorado Broadcasting, which was in the process of divesting its Central Coast stations, and KMLA owner Gold Coast Radio LLC. The New Rock website was replaced with a black screen, with the New Rock logo and the words "New Rock... out. It's been a great ride. Thanks for everything." In October, Gold Coast Radio purchased KURQ from El Dorado for $600,000. The station changed its call sign to KMLM-FM on December 1.
