= KHHT =

KHHT may refer to:

- KHHT (FM), a radio station (98.9 FM) licensed to serve Mettler, California, United States
- KRRL, a radio station (92.3 FM) licensed to serve Los Angeles, California, which held the call sign KHHT from 2001 to 2015
- KQKS, a radio station (107.5 FM) licensed to serve Lakewood, Colorado, United States, which held the call sign KHHT from 1996 to 1997
- KYYX, a radio station (97.1 FM) licensed to serve Minot, North Dakota, United States, which held the call sign KHHT from 1984 to 1992
