= KVEN (Ventura, California) =

Radio station

Coordinates: 34°15′39″N 119°14′28″W

- Ventura, California; United States
- Broadcast area: Oxnard-Ventura, California
- Frequency: 1450 kHz
- Branding: SportsRadio 1450

Programming
- Format: Sports
- Affiliations: CBS Sports Radio; Los Angeles Dodgers Radio Network

Ownership
- Owner: Cumulus Media; (Cumulus Licensing LLC)
- Sister stations: KBBY-FM, KHAY, KRUZ, KVYB

History
- First air date: March 1948; 78 years ago
- Last air date: July 23, 2021; 4 years ago
- Call sign meaning: Ventura

Technical information
- Facility ID: 35847
- Class: C
- Power: 1,000 watts

KVEN (1450 AM, "SportsRadio 1450") was a radio station licensed to Ventura, California. Operating from 1948 to 2021, KVEN last carried sports radio programming from the national CBS Sports Radio network, with no locally-originated programming. It was owned by Cumulus Media and broadcast with a power of 1,000 watts.

== History ==
KVEN first signed on in March 1948 and aired a variety of programming during its first four decades. In 1965, Carroll R. Houser sold KVEN and sister station KVEN-FM to a group consisting of Ira Laufer, Robert L. Fox, and Greater California Capital Corporation — collectively doing business as KVEN Broadcasting Corporation — for $500,000. The new owners instituted new programming, consisting primarily of a middle of the road music format but also including regular editorials and more time devoted to public affairs. Within one year, the station saw a significant increase in advertising revenues.

In 1980, KVEN adopted a news/talk format. A prominent on-air personality from this era was Phil Hendrie, who left KFI in August 1990 to begin hosting a weekday afternoon program. The Phil Hendrie Show presented current topics in a satirical fashion using a cast of fictional characters. One such persona was "Raj Fahneen", introduced in September 1990 to "defend" the positions of Saddam Hussein just as tensions were rising in the Middle East in the lead-up to the Gulf War. A notable, more serious episode was broadcast November 4, 1991, the opening day of the Reagan Library, featuring a five-way on-air roundtable chat with US Presidents Jimmy Carter, Gerald Ford, Ronald Reagan, Richard Nixon, and George H. W. Bush. Hendrie left KVEN in 1992 to take his show to several major-market stations across the country. Overall, the station was one of Southern California's top 20 rated radio stations during the 1990s.

In August 1996, Fox sold KVEN and its FM counterpart, now called KHAY, to McDonald Media Group for $12.7 million. In December 1999, McDonald Media Group sold its eight stations, including KVEN, to Cumulus Media for $41 million; this marked Cumulus' debut on the Pacific coast.

KVEN adopted the branding "1450 The Boomer" in 2000 as an oldies radio station. Originally formatted by radio veteran Lee Marshall, it also aired the syndicated Wolfman Jack and Dr. Demento programs. Both were cancelled upon the switchover to ABC Radio's True Oldies Channel on June 23, 2008.

On February 1, 2011, KVEN flipped to a sports format with programming from ESPN Radio. The station became one of the first to carry the CBS Sports Radio network when it was launched January 3, 2013. KVEN added Armstrong & Getty to its lineup in August 2016.

KVEN broadcast major sporting events, most featuring Los Angeles-area teams. KVEN served as the Ventura County home of the Los Angeles Dodgers of Major League Baseball, while during the NCAA football season the station broadcast University of Southern California Trojans football games.

Cumulus shut down KVEN in July 2021, and surrendered its license to the Federal Communications Commission. Dodgers broadcasts were moved to sister station KVYB on July 23.

The Federal Communications Commission cancelled the station’s license on July 23, 2021.

As of May 20, 2022, the KVEN call letters reside on 1520 AM in nearby Port Hueneme.
