= KWXY =

Radio station in Cathedral City, California

Coordinates: 33°48′7.1″N 116°27′47″W

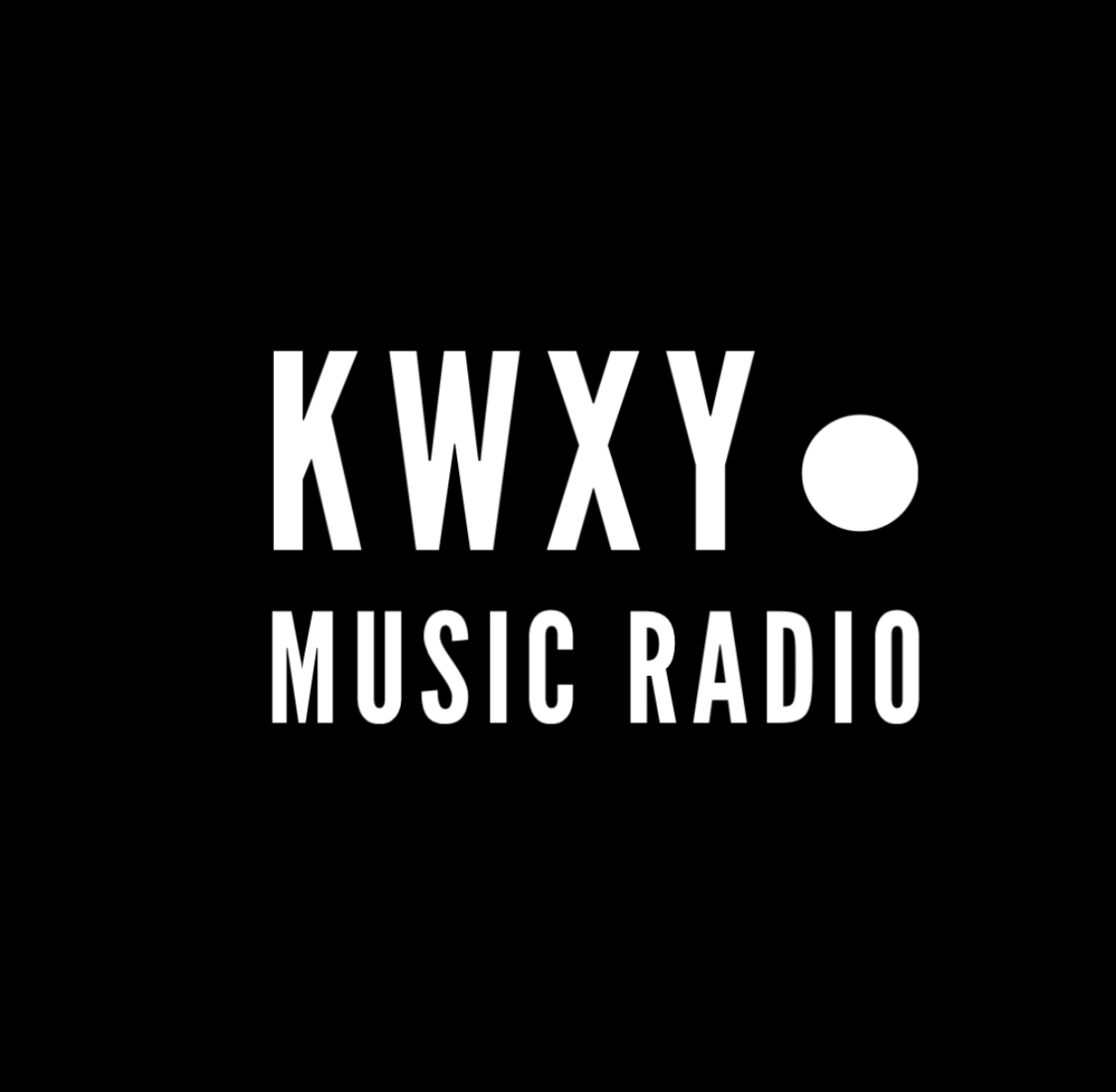
- Cathedral City, California; United States
- Broadcast area: Coachella Valley
- Frequency: 1340 kHz
- Branding: KWXY Music Radio

Programming
- Format: Variety

Ownership
- Owner: Louie Comella; (IVOX Radio LLC)
- Sister stations: KKGX

History
- First air date: October 4, 1964
- Former call signs: KWXY (1964–2006); KPTR (2006–2010)

Technical information
- Licensing authority: FCC
- Facility ID: 24252
- Class: C
- Power: 1,000 watts
- Translator: 92.3 K222DA (Cathedral City)

Links
- Public license information: Public file; LMS
- Website: kwxy.com

KWXY (1340 AM) is a radio station in Cathedral City, California, United States, serving the Palm Springs area. It is owned by IVOX Radio and broadcasts a variety music format of songs from the 1940s through the 1970s. The studios, offices, and transmitter are located on Dinah Shore Drive. Programming is simulcast on the FM band by translator station K222DA on 92.3 MHz.

KWXY began broadcasting on October 4, 1964, and for nearly 42 years had one owner and one format. The station was built by Glen Barnett and broadcast beautiful music. A sister FM station, KWXY-FM, operated alongside it beginning in 1969. The AM frequency was sold in 2006 to R&R Radio Corporation and became a progressive talk station under the call sign KPTR. Barnett sold R&R the FM facility in 2010, leading to a multi-station shuffle that brought easy listening back to the AM band, later paired with a translator. Under the ownership of Desert Broadcasters from 2017 to 2021, KWXY aired a version of the beautiful music format. IVOX acquired it in 2021 and instituted the current name and format.

== History ==
=== Glen Barnett ownership ===
On April 6, 1962, Glen Barnett applied to the Federal Communications Commission (FCC) for a construction permit to build a new AM radio station in Cathedral City, California, with 250 watts of power. The commission approved the application on July 31, 1963, and KWXY began broadcasting on October 4, 1964, from studios at 34th Avenue (Note: Renamed Dinah Shore Drive in 1986) and Via Altamira. Broadcasting to the upper half of the Coachella Valley, It aired a beautiful music format and was the first station in the Palm Springs area to have a specific format at all. Power was doubled to 500 watts in October 1968.

An FM station, KWXY-FM 103.1, was approved in 1968 and began broadcasting in January 1969. It operated on that frequency until March 1976, when it moved to 98.5 MHz and increased power.

KWXY was known for regular features such as interviews by Alyce Walker, who conducted 5,000 interviews on her 15-minute show from 1968 until she retired in 1988. In the late 1980s, it catered to snowbirds by carrying daily newscasts from the Pacific Northwest and Canada. Despite an aging audience and a limited introduction of more modern musical selections, the KWXY stations, which formed a simulcast, were the top-rated radio stations in Palm Springs for years.

=== R&R ownership ===
In 2006, Barnett sold KWXY AM to R&R Radio Corporation, owned by Ric and Rozene Supple and a cluster of four Palm Springs–market stations. KWXY continued broadcasting its beautiful music on FM, but the $2.3 million sale led the AM to change call signs and formats. On August 7, 2006, the frequency relaunched as KPTR, a progressive talk station with programming from Air America Radio. In 2010, Barnett sold KWXY-FM to R&R at the same time that it sold the original KDES-FM for $10 million to be relocated to Redlands. The closure of that deal sparked a domino effect. The oldies format of KDES-FM moved to 98.5. KWXY's beautiful music moved back to 1340. KPTR's progressive talk moved to 1450 kHz.

KWXY received an FM signal again in 2014 when it began simulcasting on Palm Springs translator K297BO (107.3 MHz), fed by the HD2 subchannel of KDES-FM. The translator split from KWXY in 2015 after Alpha Media purchased KDES and KPSI-FM from R&R, and KWXY AM began airing a talk format while the FM retained an instrumental-free version of the existing format.

On August 12, 2016, KWXY and sister station KPSI (now KKGX) were taken silent by the Supples, both in their 90s, who wanted to cut back on their businesses and sought a buyer. Desert Broadcasters, led by Garry Wing, agreed to acquire both stations from R&R Radio Corporation in October 2016. Desert relaunched both stations in March 2017 and returned the 1340 frequency to a version of the prior format, billed as "Relaxing Music". However, the stations lost money. Wing and the Supples disagreed over use of the property, which was restricted by easements related to the tower on site and zoning. Wing had also promised no changes in format and could not use much of the business data left behind by the Supples.

=== IVOX ownership ===
Effective June 9, 2021, Desert Broadcasters sold KWXY, KKGX and two translators to Louie Comella's IVOX RADIO LLC for $105,000. The sale included the KKGX tower site in Palm Springs for $220,000 and the original KWXY "Broadcast Center" Dinah Shore building for $550,000. IVOX planned to expand the KKGX tower site, building on its 28.4-acre (11.5 ha) desert site for use by its streaming platform and as future independent motion picture studio lot and theater venue. Comella told The Desert Sun that the equipment for the station was "so jacked up", prompting a lengthy off-air period. On December 12, 2021, KWXY and KKGX returned to the air, with KWXY airing a new "Music Radio" format focusing on music from the 1940s to the 1970s. Among the hosts on both stations at launch was Wink Martindale, a resident of Palm Desert. In 2024, several affiliated entities holding interests in real estate associated with broadcasting facilities became involved in Chapter 11 proceedings amid ongoing litigation with Newtek Small Business Finance. IVOX Radio LLC was not a debtor in those proceedings. Separately, Louie Comella filed federal litigation “Louie Comella vs NewtekOne”
