= KZLA (disambiguation) =

KZLA may refer to:

- KZLA, a radio station (98.3 FM) licensed to Huron, California
- KLLI (FM), a radio station (93.9 FM) licensed to Los Angeles, California, which used the call signs KZLA or KZLA-FM from August 1978 to August 2006
- Los Angeles Air Route Traffic Control Center in Palmdale, California
