= David Cruz (journalist) =

American broadcast journalist and radio host

- Education: University of Texas at Austin, Lyndon B. Johnson School of Public Affairs
- Occupations: Broadcast journalist, radio host, civil rights advocate
- Years active: 1976–present
- Employer(s): League of United Latin American Citizens(National Communications Director), Salem Media Group, KNBC, Univision, CBS, CNN, ABC, Fox News
- Known for: News anchor at KNBC, National Communications Director for LULAC, host of La Voz de Texas
- Awards: Golden Mike Award (2003), Emmy Award, LULAC National Media Awards (2), Golden Eagle Award (2002)

David Cruz is an American broadcast journalist, radio host, and civil rights advocate. He serves as the National Communications Director for the League of United Latin American Citizens (LULAC), acting as a spokesperson on immigration, Latino rights, and social justice issues. He previously worked as a reporter and news anchor at KNBC (NBC4), in Los Angeles, California, where he co-anchored newscasts and contributed to national broadcasts. He has also held positions with Salem Media Group, Univision, CBS, CNN, ABC, and Fox News. His recognitions include a Golden Eagle Award from Nosotros in 2002, a 2003 Golden Mike Award, an Emmy Award, and two National Media Awards from LULAC.

== Early life and education ==
David Cruz was raised in San Antonio, Texas, by Mary and Apolonio Cruz. His interest in storytelling grew from hearing his father tell stories to customers at his San Antonio barbershop. His interest in journalism was developed by a local television news anchor's visit to Harlandale High School during his freshman year. After graduating from high school, he sold women's shoes and painted houses while attending the University of Texas at Austin, Lyndon B. Johnson School of Public Affairs.

== Career ==
=== Television ===
Cruz began his broadcasting career at KWEX-DT when Univision was known as Spanish International Network (SIN). In 1976, he became a television anchor at an NBC affiliate KMOL-TV, now WOAI-TV, in San Antonio. He was considered the lead anchorman and he was regularly mentioned in the San Antonio Express-News. He faced opposition including threats, egg-throwing, and broken windows after replacing two Caucasian anchors: Gene Lively and Martha Buchanan. He faced rumors that he was going to be replaced. His employer stated there was no substance to the rumor.

In 1979, he went on to work for CBS News based in San Francisco, KPIX-TV. He was a correspondent for the Pacific Rim and Latin America. He covered politics and foreign affairs. In 1986, he co-founded Gold Coast Productions and worked as a freelance journalist in Dallas, Texas, producing content on transnational topics, primarily Mexico and the United States, for ABC News, among others. From 1991 to 1996, Cruz held various news assignments with CBS’s KTVT-11 in Dallas. In 1993, CNN selected him to host La Voz de Texas, the nation’s first nationally syndicated bilingual talk radio program, which he anchored for three years.

In 1996, he joined KNBC in Los Angeles, California as a reporter and anchor of various newscasts, including a news anchor of Today in L.A. In 2000, he was the named to the Mid-Day Report. In 2001, Cruz and Kelly Mack took over Today in L.A. He reported on gang violence, law enforcement corruption, consumer fraud, and child predators, among other stories. In 2008, he left KNBC and launched BrightFlash Media, producing Spanish and English news content and public affairs projects like Tu Salud, Tu y La Ley, and Hispanics in Crisis, which highlighted issues of immigration.

=== Radio ===
From 2010, Cruz hosted the bilingual morning show La Voz Poderosa on KOXR-AM 910 in Oxnard from 6 to 9 a.m. at Radio Lazer. In January 2012, he premiered The David Cruz Show on KTLK-AM 1150 in Los Angeles from 3 to 6 p.m., offering an alternative to conservative talk radio. Some commentators believed that Cruz's hiring brought balance to radio programming on KFI and KTLK after KFI’s John Kobylt and Ken Chiampou were the target of protests from Latino groups for their campaign against the California Dream Act. He covered local and national issues.

In 2012, he joined iHeartRadio's Los Angeles station group as Director of Corporate and Community Partnerships in emerging markets, a role he held until May 2015. From 2015 to 2020, he was a partner in BrightFlash Media, a multilingual digital media content company. In 2020, he became Vice President of Salem Sí at Salem Media Group, where he oversaw the launch of an online streaming platform.

== Advocacy work ==
In 2002, he was Chapter President of the National Hispanic Media Coalition. He criticized the media for shutting out Latinos, citing the conversion of Spanish radio stations to music-only formats and layoffs, such as 50 workers at a Los Angeles station. He urged viewers to demand coverage and noting KNBC's lack of a Ventura County bureau despite a significant Latino audience.

=== LULAC role ===
From 1994 to 1996, Cruz served as League of United Latin American Citizens's state and national spokesman. He has served as LULAC's national spokesman for many years. On July 11, 2019, Cruz helped moderate the LULAC Presidential Candidates Forum, featuring Julian Castro, Bernie Sanders, Elizabeth Warren, and Beto O'Rourke, in Milwaukee, Wisconsin, during the organization's national convention. He provided commentary in the wake of the 2020 Democratic National Convention's moment featuring an 11-year-old discussing her mother's deportation. After the Uvalde school shooting in 2022, he indicated that LULAC would intensify its advocacy for gun control measures. In 2023, he condemned the death of a man on I-30 in Benton, Arkansas, as an "egregious" violation of civil rights, which involved a Latino individual chased and tased after fleeing a traffic stop. In 2024, he joined LULAC President Roman Palomares on a visit to Nebraska to plan a pilot program supporting immigrant workers. After the 2025 Donald Trump speech to a joint session of Congress, Cruz condemned the speech as divisive and fostering fear. In May 2025, Cruz criticized the vote harvesting indictments in Frio County. After the 2025 Dallas ICE facility shooting, he issued a statement on behalf of the families impacted and confirmed a death. In October, he rebuked Douglas County Sheriff Aaron Hanson for invoking the organization's name without authorization in proposed ICE partnership discussions. He called for the release of children at immigration detention centers.
