= KVYB =

Californian radio station

- Oak View, California; United States
- Broadcast area: Oxnard—Ventura, California
- Frequency: 106.3 MHz
- Branding: Groovy 106.3

Programming
- Format: Oldies
- Affiliations: Los Angeles Dodgers Radio Network, The True Oldies Channel

Ownership
- Owner: Cumulus Media; (Cumulus Licensing Ltd.)
- Sister stations: KBBY-FM, KHAY, KRUZ

History
- First air date: January 30, 1982
- Former call signs: KGMQ (1981); KMGQ (1981–1998, 2005–2010); KKSB (1998–2005); KRRF (2010–2017); KRUZ (2017–2019)
- Call sign meaning: "Vibe"

Technical information
- Licensing authority: FCC
- Facility ID: 10329
- Class: A
- ERP: 960 watts
- HAAT: 252.0 meters (826.8 ft)
- Transmitter coordinates: 34°17′47″N 119°16′24″W

Links
- Public license information: Public file; LMS
- Webcast: Listen Live
- Website: groovy1063.com

KVYB (106.3 FM, "Groovy 106.3") is a commercial radio station that is licensed to Oak View, California, United States, and serves the Oxnard—Ventura, California area. Owned by Cumulus Media, the station airs an oldies format.

== History ==
=== Early years (1982–1999) ===
The station was launched on January 30, 1982 as KMGQ licensed to Goleta with a soft rock format. In March 1993, RSB Communications sold KMGQ and sister station KIST to Channel Islands Broadcasting for $850,000. The soft rock format remained until 1996 when it evolved to a broader adult contemporary playlist.

KMGQ and KIST would change hands again in September 1996 as Channel Islands Broadcasting sold the combo to Engles Enterprises for $3.5 million. The station flipped to country music in October 1998, rebranding as "Country 106.3" and changing its call sign to KKSB.

=== Cumulus era (1999–present) ===
==== 2000s: CHR, smooth jazz ====
In December 1999, Cumulus Media purchased McDonald Media Group's eight stations, including KKSB, for $41 million. This transaction marked Cumulus' entry into the Pacific states.

In March 2000, KKSB switched to a contemporary hit radio (CHR) format with the branding "Kiss". This prompted Clear Channel Communications, which also owned stations in the Santa Barbara market, to send Cumulus a cease and desist letter claiming infringement upon its "KISS-FM" trademark. Clear Channel also flipped its oldies-formatted KIST-FM to CHR using the Kiss name, battling with Cumulus head-to-head for ratings. Meanwhile, KKSB rebranded to "Hits 106.3". Ultimately, this move failed, and KKSB went on to air an oldies format.

Logo for KMGQ from March 2005 to September 2010

In March 2005, Cumulus moved its smooth jazz programming from KRUZ on the 97.5 FM frequency back to 106.3 FM, which reverted to the KMGQ call letters. On August 26, 2010, KMGQ began broadcasting in the HD Radio digital radio format. However, as of May 2018, the station does not broadcast in HD.

==== 2010s: Classic formats, move to Ventura County ====
On September 24, 2010, KMGQ changed its format from smooth jazz to classic rock, branded as "106.3 The Surf", and adopted the KRRF call sign.

In 2011, KRRF was granted a construction permit from the Federal Communications Commission to change its city of license to Oak View, California and move to a new transmitter site in Ventura County. The effective radiated power at the new site is 960 watts with the height above average terrain the same as at the former facility on Gibraltar Peak above Santa Barbara. KRRF filed for a license for the new Oak View facilities on March 13, 2013, indicating that it had begun operations from the new site. The station's format remained classic rock.

Logo for KRRF from April 2013 to August 2014

On March 31, 2013, KRRF began stunting with a wide range of music. On-air announcements stated "the time has come for something new" and advised listeners to tune in the following day at 6:33 p.m. At that time, KRRF switched its format to classic hits, branded as "Classic Hits 106.3", launching by playing 10,006 songs in a row. The first song on "Classic Hits" was "Two Tickets to Paradise" by Eddie Money.

On August 15, 2014, KRRF began stunting with liners honoring the famous landmarks of Ventura County, teasing that "a new icon is coming to Ventura County — stay tuned". At 5:00 p.m. that day, KRRF switched to country, becoming one of the stations to launch Cumulus' new Nash Icon network as "106-3 Nash Icon". The last song on Classic Hits 106.3 was "Yesterday" by The Beatles, while the first song on Nash Icon was "Don't Rock The Jukebox" by Alan Jackson.

Logo for KRUZ from May 2016 to June 2019

Nash Icon programming ended on May 27, 2016 at noon when KRRF flipped to classic hip hop as "106-3 Spin-FM". The first song on Spin-FM was "Hypnotize" by The Notorious B.I.G. The station changed its call sign to KRUZ on February 17, 2017.

Logo under previous slogan

On June 28, 2019, KRUZ changed its call sign to KVYB in preparation for a format change. The following day, KVYB flipped to CHR, branded as "106-3 The Vibe". At the same time, the KRUZ call letters moved to KVYB's previous home at 103.3 FM, which was stunting with clips of 1980s events, movies, video games, and songs that hinted at the launch of a new format. KRUZ flipped to classic hits on July 1. KVYB became the Ventura County radio affiliate for the Los Angeles Dodgers Radio Network on July 23, 2021; Dodgers games had previously been carried by KVEN, which Cumulus concurrently closed down.

On April 21, 2025, KVYB dropped its top 40 format and joined Scott Shannon's True Oldies Channel network as "Groovy 106.3".
