= KVTA =

- Ventura, California; United States
- Broadcast area: Ventura County; Santa Barbara County
- Frequency: 1590 kHz
- Branding: Fox Sports 1590/97.9

Programming
- Format: Sports
- Network: Fox Sports Radio
- Affiliations: Los Angeles Lakers; Los Angeles Rams

Ownership
- Owner: Gold Coast Broadcasting; (Gold Coast Broadcasting LLC)
- Sister stations: KCAQ, KFYV, KOCP, KUNX, KVEN

History
- First air date: January 9, 1948 (78 years ago)
- Former call signs: KVVC (1947-1954); KUDU (1954–1973); KBBQ (1973–1985); KOGO (1985–1993); KBBY (1993–1994); KAHS (1994–1995); KXSP (1995–1998); KXFS (1998); KUNX (1998–2004); KKOM (2004); KKZZ (2004–2008); KUNX (2008–2013)
- Call sign meaning: Ventura

Technical information
- Licensing authority: FCC
- Facility ID: 7746
- Class: B
- Power: 5,000 watts
- Transmitter coordinates: 34°14′13″N 119°12′12.4″W
- Translator: 97.9 K250BV (Ventura)

Links
- Public license information: Public file; LMS
- Webcast: Listen live
- Website: kvta.com

KVTA (1590 AM) is a commercial radio station licensed to Ventura, California, featuring a sports radio format known as "Fox Sports 1590/97.9". Owned by Gold Coast Broadcasting, KVTA serves Ventura County and southern Santa Barbara County. The station's transmitter is located near the Santa Clara River off of the Ventura Freeway. In addition to a standard analog transmission, KVTA is relayed over low-power Ventura translator K250BV (97.9 FM), and is available online.

== History ==
KVVC took to the air on January 9, 1948, licensed jointly to the cities of Ventura and Oxnard, California. The station became KBBQ by January 1973, featuring a country format, along with NBC Radio programming.

On February 1, 1985, the call sign switched to KOGO and the format flipped to adult contemporary music. As KOGO, the station changed hands twice. In July 1986, Forrest Radio sold KOGO and sister station KBBY-FM to New York City-based ownership group Ventura Broadcasting Associates for $3 million.

That same group sold the combo three years later to Buena Ventura Inc., headed by George Duncan, for $6.7 million. KOGO renamed itself KBBY after its FM counterpart on September 17, 1993; the heritage KOGO call letters returned to the San Diego station then known as KKLQ the following year.

In December 1996, Buena Ventura Inc. sold the station, then using the KXSP calls and broadcasting in Spanish, along with KTND, to Gold Coast Broadcasting for $2 million. The transaction split the station from its longtime combo partner KBBY-FM which later would be owned by Cumulus Media.

From 1998 to 2004, the station held the KUNX call letters and aired a Spanish-language talk format under the "Radio Unica" branding. For a brief period in early 2004, it was known as KKOM and broadcast content from The American Comedy Network. The former KUNX and KKZZ then exchanged frequencies, with the KKZZ call letters landing on 1590 AM on March 5 and KUNX's Spanish programming resurfacing on 1400 AM.

During the 1590 AM frequency's second stint as KUNX starting in April 2008, it aired programming from Mexico-based news/talk network Radio Fórmula.

In February 2013, the Radio Fórmula programs moved to Gold Coast Broadcasting sister station KKZZ on 1400 AM. That same month, KUNX began simulcasting English-language news/talk outlet KVTA, which at the time was on 1520 AM. On March 6, 2013, KUNX and KVTA swapped frequencies, sending the KUNX call letters to 1520 AM and KVTA to 1590 AM.

On April 10, 2025, KVTA changed their format from news/talk to sports, branded as "Fox Sports 1590/97.9".
