= Wrightwood Mountain Music Festival =

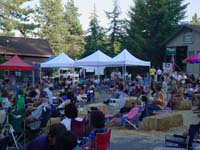
- Genre: Various
- Dates: Labor Day Weekend
- Locations: Wrightwood, California, US
- Years active: 2006–2019, 2021–
- Founders: Dan Campbell
- Website: Official website

The Wrightwood Music Festival is an annual music festival with performances held over the Labor Day Weekend in Wrightwood, CA at Vivian Null Park.

== History ==
The festival was founded in 2005 with the intention of giving the people of Wrightwood a summer music event in the evenings and to provide free quality entertainment in a unique and beautiful mountain setting. It also provides an opportunity to showcase new styles of music not usually seen in the regular venues around town. The festival features local, regional, and national acts performing on its Main Stage and Singer-Songwriter stages. In addition to two days of non-stop music, the festival has local crafts and food vendors on site.

== 2008 Performers ==
Headliners for each date are listed in bold

=== Saturday, August 30 ===
Main Stage

- 12:00pm Happy Havoc - High Energy Family Rock
- 1:30pm Gail and Company - Folk-Rock-Classics
- 3:00pm Fretlanders - Celtic Bluegrass
- 4:30pm Bucksworth - Alternative Country Rock
- 6:30pm Hobo Jazz - Vaudeville, Ragtime and Comedy
- **8:15pm Still Time - Reggae Funk Rock**

Singer-Songwriter Stage

- 1:00pm Sunland String Band - Bluegrass-Folk
- 2:30pm Greg Jones Band - Rhythm and Blues
- 4:00pm Special Guest - TBA
- **5:30pm Cypress Bottom Boys - Straight-up Cajun**

=== Sunday, August 31 ===
Main Stage

- 12:00pm Rolling Reunion - Jam Rock Electronica
- 1:30pm Lorena and the Burcher Band - the Soul Lady!
- 3:00pm Teddy Lee Hooker - Blues Guitarist-Singer
- 4:30pm Tracks Like Trains - Uniquely Original with Harp
- 6:30pm Cypress Bottom Boys - Straight-up Cajun
- **7:45pm Chickenbone - Gulf Coast Southern Rock**

Singer-Songwriter Stage

- 1:00pm Matt Coleman and Chad - the Dynamic Duo
- 2:30pm Po Dunk Nowhere - Singer-Guitar
- 4:00pm Dan and Justin - Homegrown Roots Rock
- **5:30pm Tyrone Merriner and the US Band featuring Big T**

== Affiliated Venues ==
- Yodeler
