= KOXR =

Radio station in Oxnard, California

Coordinates: 34°16′58″N 119°07′39.4″W

- Oxnard, California; United States
- Broadcast area: Ventura County
- Frequency: 910 kHz
- Branding: La Mexicana 102.1 y 910 AM

Programming
- Format: Ranchera/mariachi

Ownership
- Owner: Lazer Media; (Lazer Licenses, LLC)

History
- First air date: June 11, 1955; 70 years ago
- Call sign meaning: K OXnaRd

Technical information
- Licensing authority: FCC
- Facility ID: 866
- Class: B
- Power: 5,000 watts day 1,000 watts night
- Translator: 102.1 K271CY (Oxnard)

Links
- Public license information: Public file; LMS
- Webcast: Listen Live
- Website: KOXR Online

KOXR (910 AM) is a commercial radio station licensed to Oxnard, California. It broadcasts a traditional ranchera music format featuring mariachi groups from Mexico. It is owned by Lazer Media and calls itself "La Mexicana 102.1 y 910 AM."

By day, KOXR broadcasts at 5,000 watts. But to avoid interference to other stations on 910 AM, it reduces power at night to 1,000 watts. It uses a directional antenna at all times. The transmitter is off Southern Pacific Milling Road in Santa Paula, near the Santa Clara River. KOXR is also heard on 250 watt FM translator K271CY at 102.1 MHz in Oxnard.

== History ==
On June 11, 1955, the station first signed on. It was owned by the Oxnard Broadcasting Corporation. For several decades the station aired a variety format, which always included at least a few hours of Spanish-language programming each week. By 1964, 90 hours of the weekly schedule was in Spanish (approximately 70% of the then-standard 18-hour broadcast day).

Logo for KOXR prior to the sign-on of the 102.1 FM simulcast.

By the fall of 1966, KOXR's entire 18-hour broadcast day was in Spanish.

In 1970, Oxnard Broadcasting sold KOXR to Howard A. Kalmenson for $598,000. Kalmenson subsequently formed Lotus Communications with KOXR and co-owned KWKW in Pasadena, CA and KENO in Las Vegas, Nevada. Lotus kept the station until 1994, when they sold it to Albert and Jacquelyn Vera for $350,000. Albert Vera had been a deejay at KSPA (now KUNX) in Santa Paula, California when it was a Spanish-language station in the 1960s. He sold the station to Radio Lazer three years later. From 2010, David Cruz (journalist) hosted a radio show for a number of years.
