= KFYV =

Radio station in Ojai–Ventura, California

- Ojai, California; United States
- Broadcast area: Oxnard—Ventura, California
- Frequency: 105.5 MHz
- Branding: Live 105-5

Programming
- Format: Contemporary hit radio
- Affiliations: Premiere Networks

Ownership
- Owner: Gold Coast Broadcasting; (Gold Coast Broadcasting LLC)
- Sister stations: KCAQ, KOCP, KUNX, KVEN, KVTA

History
- First air date: January 4, 1972
- Former call signs: KOVA (1972–1984); KMYX (1984–1989); KKUR (1989–1994); KTND (1994–1997); KKBE (1997–2003)

Technical information
- Licensing authority: FCC
- Facility ID: 7744
- Class: A
- ERP: 310 watts
- HAAT: 438 meters (1,437 ft)
- Transmitter coordinates: 34.348611°N 119.336944°W
- Repeaters: 105.5 KFYV-FM1 (Oak View); 105.5 KFYV-FM2 (Ventura)

Links
- Public license information: Public file; LMS
- Webcast: Listen live
- Website: live1055.fm

KFYV (105.5 FM, "Live 105-5") is a commercial radio station licensed to Ojai, California, United States, and serves the Oxnard–Ventura market. Owned by Gold Coast Broadcasting, it airs a contemporary hit radio format with studios in Ventura and transmitter sited off Red Mountain Fire Road in Ventura. KFYV uses two booster stations to strengthen its signal: KFYV-FM1 in Oak View and KFYV-FM2 in Ventura, both on the 105.5 FM frequency.

== History ==
=== KOVA ===
The station first signed on January 4, 1972, as KOVA. It was owned by Fred Hall and played a variety of big band, adult standards, and classical music, together forming a radio format described as "Good Music". The station also aired reruns of old radio shows such as Jack Benny, The Lone Ranger, and The Shadow. In March 1979, Hall sold KOVA to Frank Spencer for $375,000.

=== KMYX – "K-Mix 106" ===
New station general manager and longtime Ventura County broadcaster Michael R. Thomas enacted sweeping changes. Initially, Thomas switched KOVA to an easy listening format after KACY-FM (104.7 FM) dropped it in favor of top 40 as KCAQ (Q105). That format was short-lived, however, as he flipped the station to an urban contemporary format branded "K-Mix 106" on January 24, 1984, adopting new call letters KMYX. K-Mix was programmed by Howard Thomas (known on-air as "H.T."), son of the station's GM. The elder Thomas purchased the station from Spencer in 1986. In the Arbitron Spring 1987 ratings report, KMYX landed in a three-way tie for first place in the Oxnard-Ventura market with KCAQ and regional Mexican outlet KOXR overall, beating Q105 among adults 18–34.

As the 1980s drew to a close, so did the K-Mix 106 era. Howard Thomas died in an automobile accident in Los Angeles in August 1988. Michael Thomas changed KMYX's format to country music in March 1989 with local radio veteran Bob Stevens as program director and additional veterans K.M. "The Rebel" Richards and Steve Carr as the drive-time hour air talent. The country format only lasted several months.

=== KKUR/KTND/KKBE ===
On November 8, 1989, Thomas sold KMYX to Los Angeles–based ownership group Eric/Chandler Communications of Ventura, Inc., who changed the call letters to KKUR and the format to hot adult contemporary. Taking over as GM was Pat Finn, who would also host the 1990 revival of The Joker's Wild. That group sold the station in September 1992 to Buena Ventura Inc., headed by George Duncan and Ronald Greenberg, for $725,000—less than half the 1989 purchase price of $1.8 million. In March 1994, KKUR flipped to country as KTND, "Thunder 105.5".

In December 1996, Gold Coast Broadcasting purchased KTND and AM sister station KXSP for $2 million. The new owner adopted a soft adult contemporary format branded "The Breeze" with new call letters KKBE.

=== KFYV – "Live 105-5" ===
In 2003, KKBE was relaunched as KFYV, a contemporary hit radio (CHR) station branded "Live 105-5", under the guidance of program director and morning personality Mark Elliott. Elliott, a veteran of the Oxnard-Ventura radio market, joined Gold Coast Broadcasting as the Director of Programming and Broadcast Operations after leaving Cumulus Media-owned station KBBY-FM.

Syndicated programming on KFYV includes On Air with Ryan Seacrest weekday middays and American Top 40, also hosted by Ryan Seacrest, on weekends.
