= KBBY-FM =

Coordinates: 34.113°N 119.060°W

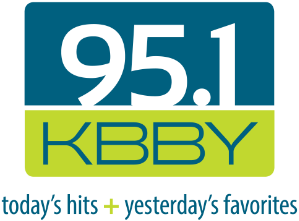
- Ventura, California; United States
- Broadcast area: Oxnard-Ventura, California
- Frequency: 95.1 MHz
- Branding: 95.1 KBBY

Programming
- Format: Adult contemporary
- Affiliations: Compass Media Networks; Westwood One

Ownership
- Owner: Cumulus Media; (Cumulus Licensing LLC)
- Sister stations: KHAY, KRUZ, KVYB

History
- First air date: December 27, 1962
- Former call signs: KUDU-FM (1962–1973); KBBY (1973–1993)
- Call sign meaning: "K-Baby" (former progressive rock format)

Technical information
- Licensing authority: FCC
- Facility ID: 7745
- Class: B
- ERP: 12,500 watts
- HAAT: 267 meters (876 ft)

Links
- Public license information: Public file; LMS
- Webcast: Listen Live; Listen live (via iHeartRadio)
- Website: 951kbby.com

KBBY-FM (95.1 MHz, "95-1 KBBY") is a commercial radio station that is licensed to Ventura, California and serves the Oxnard–Ventura, California area. The station is owned by Cumulus Media and broadcasts an adult contemporary music format.

== History ==
=== Early years ===
The station first signed on December 27, 1962, as KUDU-FM, simulcasting AM sister station KUDU. Owned by Tri-Counties Public Service Inc., it was the first automated top 40 station in Southern California.

In 1969, KUDU-FM switched its call letters to KBBY and flipped to a progressive rock format with the branding "K-Baby". Launched by John Hendrix and KACY-FM veteran Ron Herron, KBBY had the largest share among rock stations in the Ventura–Santa Barbara–Oxnard radio market within one year. K-Baby lasted only four years as the station reverted to top 40 programming in 1973.

Over the next two decades, KBBY underwent several format and ownership changes. In late 1978, Tri-Counties Public Service sold KBBY and KBBQ to Forrest Broadcasting Co. for $1.2 million; the new owner flipped KBBY to a country music format. In July 1986, Forrest Radio sold KBBY and its AM sister station, then known as KOGO, to New York–based ownership group Ventura Broadcasting Associates for $3 million. The station then adopted an adult contemporary format. That group would in turn sell the combo in 1989 to Buena Ventura Inc., headed by George Duncan, for $6.7 million.

The station's call sign became KBBY-FM on September 17, 1993, to accommodate its AM counterpart adopting the KBBY calls. In December 1996, Buena Ventura Inc. sold KBBY-FM to McDonald Media Group for $6.6 million, bringing it under common ownership with fellow Ventura-based stations KVEN and KHAY.

=== Cumulus era (since 1999) ===
KBBY-FM once again changed hands in December 1999 as part of Cumulus Media's purchase of McDonald Media Group. The $41 million, eight-station transaction marked Cumulus' entry into the Pacific states. Upon completion of the sale, Cumulus immediately flipped KBBY-FM's format to hot adult contemporary, rebranding the station "B95.1".

In April 2015, KBBY-FM reverted to its previous adult contemporary format and adopted the branding "95-1 KBBY".

As of July 2019, Dave Randall hosts the weekday midday timeslot. He has previously worked with other Southern California radio stations, including Ventura County's KCAQ in the early 1990s and KNX and KRTH in Los Angeles. Bill Michaels is the weekday afternoon drivetime host. Syndicated programming on KBBY-FM includes The Bob and Sheri Show in morning drive, The John Tesh Radio Show weeknights, and both the 1980s and 1990s editions of Backtrax USA on Saturday evenings.

KBBY-FM plays Christmas music from late November through Christmas Day. In the mid-2010s, the station employed a round-the-clock holiday format. As of 2016, this 24/7 format was discontinued in favor of adding Christmas songs to the station's regular playlist for the season, as well playing all-Christmas music on Christmas Eve and Christmas Day.
