= KHAY =

Coordinates: 34.349°N 119.333°W

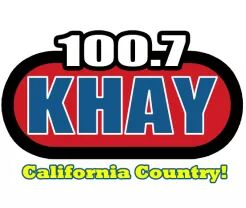
- Ventura, California; United States
- Broadcast area: Oxnard–Ventura–; Thousand Oaks, California
- Frequency: 100.7 MHz
- Branding: 100.7 KHAY

Programming
- Language: English
- Format: Country music
- Affiliations: Nash FM; Westwood One

Ownership
- Owner: Cumulus Media; (Cumulus Licensing LLC)
- Sister stations: KBBY-FM, KRUZ, KVYB

History
- First air date: 1962; 64 years ago
- Former call signs: KVEN-FM (1962–1973)
- Call sign meaning: Hay

Technical information
- Licensing authority: FCC
- Facility ID: 35848
- Class: B
- ERP: 39,000 watts
- HAAT: 369 meters (1,211 ft)

Links
- Public license information: Public file; LMS
- Webcast: Listen live
- Website: www.khay.com

KHAY (100.7 FM, "100.7 KHAY") is a commercial radio station licensed to Ventura, California and broadcasts to the Oxnard–Ventura–Thousand Oaks, California area. The station is owned by Cumulus Media and airs a country music format featuring programming from Nash FM.

== History ==
The station signed on January 1, 1962, as KVEN-FM and simulcast the middle of the road music format of its AM counterpart KVEN. In 1965, Carroll R. Houser sold KVEN-AM-FM to a group consisting of Ira Laufer, Robert L. Fox, and Greater California Capital Corporation – collectively doing business as KVEN Broadcasting Corporation – for $500,000.

In October 1973, KVEN-FM changed its call sign to KHAY and adopted a country music format. It was the first FM country station in California to broadcast in stereo.

In August 1996, McDonald Media Group purchased KHAY and KVEN for $12.7 million. In December 1999, Cumulus Media purchased McDonald Media Group's eight stations, including KHAY, for $41 million.

In the mid-2010s, KHAY carried programming from the Nash FM country music network, which is also owned by Cumulus. Such syndicated shows included Nights with Elaina (which still airs on KHAY as of 2023) and The Blair Garner Show. Cumulus' country stations were typically required to adopt the Nash FM name and other brand elements; however, KHAY was exempt due to its heritage status.

== Awards and nominations ==
On February 7, 2018, KHAY received its first-ever nominations for the Academy of Country Music's annual Radio Awards, honoring excellence in country radio. The award ceremony was held April 14 in conjunction with, and the day before, the 53rd ACM Awards in Las Vegas but was not televised. KHAY won one award that year.

Year	Awards	Category	Recipient	Result	Source
2018	Academy of Country Music Awards — Radio Awards	Radio Station of the Year – Small Market		Nominated	
2018	Academy of Country Music Awards — Radio Awards	On-Air Personality of the Year – Small Market	Dave Daniels	Won	
2019	Academy of Country Music Awards — Radio Awards	Radio Station of the Year – Small Market		Won	
