= Still Time (band) =

American rock band

- Origin: San Luis Obispo, California, USA
- Genres: Alternative rock, College rock, reggae rock, jam rock, funk rock, folk rock
- Years active: 2004–2012 (on hiatus)
- Label: When It Hits Records
- Members: Chris Arntzen; Dan Curcio; John Vucinich; Nick Bilich; Paul Smith-Stewart; T-Bone
- Website: www.stilltimemusic.com

Still Time is an American rock band from San Luis Obispo, California.

== History ==
Still Time formed over a number of years while at the California Polytechnic State University. Dan Curcio and Chris “Haircut” Arntzen began their musical collaboration after meeting in the Sierra Madre dorms in the Fall of 2002. In 2003, Nick Bilich was introduced to Curcio through his girlfriend and Haircut discovered John Vucinich drumming on his knee in the hallway of the math building. The band was completed a year later in 2004 when Vucinich met bassist Paul “Slapmaster” Smith-Stewart playing in the university jazz band. With Smith-Stewart playing the bass, Bilich switched from bass to guitar.

They began playing a number of shows around the San Luis Obispo under the name Longview. This was soon changed to The New Longview as a tribute to Spinal Tap when they realized another band was already known as Longview. In 2005, they recorded an LP called Still Time and continued to play local gigs until their song "High Tide" began getting heavy rotation on local station KURQ and was featured in the compilation album SLO & Dysfunctional Vol. 3. As their popularity grew, they began opening for acts such as Pepper, Robert Randolph and the Family Band, and Ziggy Marley.

Deciding that simply adding “The New” to their name did not distinguish themselves enough from Longview, the band changed their name to Still Time in 2007. This coincided with the release of their first major LP, Stream of Consciousness, in November.

2008 was one of Still Time's most dynamic years, performing at a number of instantly recognizable festivals such as Ranchita Rocks, the first annual Pozo Green Music Festival, and Cal Poly's Welcome Week Block Party. In addition to their spotlight live performance profile, Still Time has earned rotation spots on a number of terrestrial FM and internet radio stations, including features on Insomnia Radio, and live performances on a number of stations including KPIG's "Please Stand By".

In addition to playing shows along the West Coast, Still Time released the album "See America," in Spring 2009 and "Call It What You Want", an EP, in 2011.

Much to the dismay of their large fanbase, in 2011 the economic realities and rigors of maintaining a six-member band forced the members to disband and pursue other life endeavors while continuing to explore music interests individually. They went on indefinite hiatus after two final shows at the SLO Brew in San Luis Obispo, California in which they played "See America" in its entirety one night and "Stream of Consciousness" in its entirety the final night along with other classics and covers. And the end of the second show on May 19, 2012, the band played fan favorite "Come Alive" as their encore, the last song they would play live before going on hiatus.

Lead singer and lyricist Dan Curcio has launched a successful solo career with the release of his first CD titled "Bonfire". By mid-2012, Curcio met and started collaborating with guitarist, keyboard and percussionist Nathan Towne to record and perform as Moonshiner. Bass player Paul Smith-Stewart moved back to the San Francisco Bay Area, earned his Bachelor's in Interdisciplinary Music Studies from Berklee College of Music, and is now the Director of Performing Arts at his alma mater, Marin Catholic College Preparatory. In addition to his teaching role, Paul is a professional composer having released two EPs (Transitions and Renewal) with his jazz collective and a single (Autumn Has Come) featuring vocalist/composer Rebecca Mimiaga. Paul received his Master's in Music Composition in February 2020 having composed pieces for percussion trio, string quartet, jazz fusion quintet and vocal jazz trio. He also continues to tour and record as a professional bass player with notable SF Bay Area artists such as Jacob Aranda and The Good Bad.

== Members ==
Dan Curcio - acoustic guitar, vocals
Chris Arntzen - Guitar
Nick Bilich - Guitar
Paul Smith-Stewart - Bass
John Vucinich - drums
T Bone - Harmonica

== Sound ==
Still Time draws from many different genres such as funk, reggae, folk, and others. In an interview December 28, 2007, Curcio stated that “(People) stress so much that you need to have your own unified sound. To me, it just gets boring by the end of the CD, to hear a bunch of songs that sound the same, sound like one 60-minute song." The eclectic musical background of each member of the band lends itself to the different stylistic and technical approaches from song to song. In a March 25, 2008 interview, Bilich was quoted as saying “What we kind of found was we all come at music from different angles and we take all these different ideas and mold and create with them.”

Still Time's music is reflective of where they live on the Central Coast. They say, "It’s a very laid back atmosphere where we live, here in San Luis Obispo. We have a growing music community in this easy-going, small town which has helped us to write music we feel is distinctly Californian, but unique at the same time... It's one of our most important goals as a band, to stay true to ourselves and what inspires us as we write music. We feel that we have our own distinct sound, but it is constantly evolving."

In addition to the core members, Still Time plays with a wide variety of guest artists during live performances and in the studio. At times their songs have featured additional vocalists, harmonica, keyboards, guest rappers, multiple drummers, violin, didgeridoo, and a 7-piece horn section.

== Discography ==
=== Albums ===
- Call It What You Want - 2011 When It Hits Records
- The Longview LP The Doublewide Years - 2011 When It Hits Records
- See America - 2009 When It Hits Records
- Stream of Consciousness - 2007 When It Hits Records
- Still Time - 2005 (released as The New Longview)

=== Demos ===
- Four-song demo - 2007 When It Hits Records

=== Compilations ===
- SLO & Dysfunctional Vol. 3 - 2006 New Rock 107.3 / 1 Track (High Tide)
- SLO & Dysfunctional Vol. 4 - 2007 New Rock 107.3 / 1 Track (9 To 5)
- SLO & Dysfunctional Vol. 5 - 2008 New Rock 107.3 / 1 Track (American Dream)

== Notable Concerts ==
=== Tours / Festivals / Major Television & Radio Shows ===
- California Festival of Beers (Avila Beach, CA) - 2006, 2007, 2008
- Palo Alto Promenade Film and Music Festival (Palo Alto, CA) - 2008
- Oktoberfest (San Luis Obispo, CA) - 2008
- Grover Beach Dunes Festival (Grover Beach, CA) - 2008
- Santa Barbara Funk and Ska Festival (Santa Barbara, CA) - 2008
- KZOZ 93.3 FM (San Luis Obispo, CA) - 2008
- KSBY Morning Show (San Luis Obispo, CA) - 2008
- KURQ New Rock 107.3 FM (Grover Beach, CA) - 2008
- KPIG 107.5 FM "Please Stand By" 7/13/08 (Freedom, CA) - 2008
- Wrightwood Mountain Music Festival (Wrightwood, CA) - 2008
- Ranchita Rocks Music Festival (San Diego, CA) - 2008
- West Beach Music Festival (Santa Barbara, CA) - 2008
- Pozo Green Music Festival (Pozo, CA) - 2008
- Morro Bay Harbor Fest (Morro Bay, CA) - 2008
