= KXFM =

- Santa Maria, California; United States
- Broadcast area: Santa Maria-Lompoc, California
- Frequency: 99.1 MHz
- Branding: Old School 99.1 Santa Maria & 94.1 Santa Barbara

Programming
- Format: Rhythmic oldies

Ownership
- Owner: Point Broadcasting; (Point Ten LLC)
- Sister stations: KHHT, KOCP, KOSJ, KQAV, KQIE, KWIE, KZLA

History
- First air date: December 1, 1964; 61 years ago

Technical information
- Licensing authority: FCC
- Facility ID: 5470
- Class: B
- ERP: 2,300 watts
- HAAT: 581 meters (1,906 ft)
- Transmitter coordinates: 34.910°N 120.187°W

Links
- Public license information: Public file; LMS
- Website: oldschool991.com

KXFM (99.1 FM, "Old School 99.1") is a commercial radio station that is licensed to Santa Maria, California and serves the Santa Maria-Lompoc area. Owned by Point Broadcasting (through licensee Point Ten), the station broadcasts a rhythmic oldies music format and is a part of Point's Old School network of oldies stations.

== History ==
KXFM first signed on December 1, 1964.

On February 3, 2014, KXFM adjusted its previous classic rock format to mainstream rock, adding more recent songs and positioning itself as "Real Rock for the Central Coast".

In May 2016, El Dorado Broadcasters sold KXFM to Point Broadcasting for $1.175 million. Following the closing of the sale on August 31, KXFM flipped to rhythmic oldies, airing the "Old School" format found on Point sister stations KOCP in Oxnard and KQIE in Redlands.
