= Ranchita Rocks Music Festival =

- Genre: Rock
- Dates: Second weekend of September
- Locations: Ranchita, California, United States
- Years active: 2007–2008

The Ranchita Rocks Music Festival was a three-day music festival held at the Golightly Farms Ranch in Ranchita, California in 2007 and 2008.

== History ==
The three-day music festival debuted in 2007 as a fundraising concert for local environmental groups who were opposed to San Diego Gas & Electric's proposed Sunrise Powerlink electrical transmission line. The festival returned in 2008 with an emphasis on using solar, biodiesel and wind energy to power the event.

In 2008, the event was intended to support the Protect Our Communities Fund (POC), which was working with Ranchita Rocks Festival to host an eco-friendly music festival in the San Diego backcountry. Their mission was to fight the proposed high-voltage power line route scheduled to run from the Imperial Valley to San Diego County through Anza Borrego State Park, and educate on alternative energy choices.

“We strongly believe that energy does not have to be imported over dangerous high voltage transmission lines and that renewable energy should be produced locally, for local consumption,” stated festival organizer Carolyn Morrow, who hosted the event on her 160-acre (0.65 km^{2}) ranch.

The 2008 iteration was planned to host six stages, featuring classic and contemporary rock performances as well as comedy acts, craft vendors, healing arts, drum circles, aerial performers, and a campground. However, the festival received harsh criticism following allegations that a number of performers had not been paid, and hence refused to perform. Headliners such as Mountain, Particle, and the Yonder Mountain String Band were among the artists who were billed but did not appear, which forced the festival to shut down a number of stages due to a shortage of performers.

It was later reported that no funds from the festival were given to the non-profit organizations opposing the renewable energy transmission project. The festival did not achieve its goal, and in 2011 construction began on the power line between Lake Henshaw & Santa Ysabel.

== Lineup of musical performers by year ==
Headliners for each date listed in bold text.

=== 2008 ===
The 2008 line-up is available on the official Ranchita Rocks website.

==== September 12 ====
Mountain featuring Leslie West and Corky Laing, Pangea Collective, Mojow & VA, Beth Preston, Piano Extravaganza, Interstate Blues, Dopegirl, Wooden Leg, Castner's Duo, Izabella, Cubensis, Shark Attack, Delta Nove, Dull Science, Off Track, OB3, Grand Canyon, Still Time, Funky A, Chris Rollers, LA 5, Mike Delux, Red Rox, 4 Min til Midnight, The Naked Sun, Chi Club, Obscure Relevance, Linda Sublett, DJ Smitty, Zicron & Wish, DJ Atom Matter, Techno Hillbillies

==== September 13 ====
Particle, Bassnectar, Gram Rabbit, Al Howard, K-23, Still Time, Outpost, Stolen Rose, Teflon, 4 Min Til Midnight, Pangea Collective, Chi Club, Radius, Izabella, Vegitation, Melvin Seals, PUJA, Obscure, Chris Rollers, Glenn Smith, Haywire, Compass Rose, Blackbirdz, Linda Sublett, Nikki O'Neill, Dull Science, Mind World, O.T.I., Beth Preson with guitarist Dale Hauskins, Jay Constable (Jay and The Constables), ON THE ONE, Mike Delux, OB3, LA 5, MoJow & VA, Zicron & Wish, Dopegirl

==== September 14 ====
Yonder Mountain String Band, Tom Rreund, Nate LaPointe Band, Left Hand Monkey, Compass Rose, MoJow & VA, Beth Preston with guitarist Dale Hauskins, Outpost, The Frequency, Techno Hillbillies, The Troubleweeds, Wooden Leg, Haywire, The Naked Sun, Blackbirdz, Cheap Thrills, Delta Nove, Off Track, O.T.I., Destructo Bunny, Linda Sublett

== See also ==
- List of electronic music festivals
