= KHHT (FM) =

- Mettler, California; United States
- Broadcast area: Bakersfield metropolitan area
- Frequency: 98.9 MHz
- Branding: Old School 98.9

Programming
- Format: Rhythmic oldies

Ownership
- Owner: Point Five LLC

History
- First air date: March 5, 2015
- Call sign meaning: Hit

Technical information
- Licensing authority: FCC
- Facility ID: 191523
- Class: A
- ERP: 1,400 watts
- HAAT: 502 meters (1,647 ft)
- Transmitter coordinates: 34°54′11″N 118°54′14″W

Links
- Public license information: Public file; LMS
- Website: oldschool989.com

KHHT (98.9 FM) is a commercial radio station licensed to Mettler, California, United States, and serving the Bakersfield metropolitan area. It airs a rhythmic oldies format and is owned by Point Five LLC. KHHT carries Point Five's "Old School Network" which is also heard on KOCP in Oxnard, California, and on KQIE in Redlands, California.

The transmitter tower is located off of B Road in Mettler.

== History ==
KHHT began broadcasting on March 5, 2015.
