= KKGX =

- Palm Springs, California; United States
- Broadcast area: Coachella Valley
- Frequency: 920 kHz
- Branding: Alternative Talk Radio

Programming
- Format: Public radio and talk
- Affiliations: American Public Media; BBC World Service; Public Radio Exchange

Ownership
- Owner: Louie Comella; (IVOX MEDIA, LLC)
- Sister stations: KWXY

History
- First air date: October 29, 1956
- Former call signs: KDES (1956–1984, 1987–1994, 1995–1997); KKAM (1984–1987); KESQ (1994–1995); KPSI (1997–2017)

Technical information
- Licensing authority: FCC
- Facility ID: 67355
- Class: B
- Power: 5,000 watts (day); 1,000 watts (night)
- Transmitter coordinates: 33°51′29.1″N 116°29′42″W
- Translator: 99.1 K256CU (Palm Springs)

Links
- Public license information: Public file; LMS
- Webcast: Listen Live
- Website: kkgx.org

KKGX (920 AM) is a commercial radio station licensed to Palm Springs, California, United States, and serving the Coachella Valley. The station is owned by Louie Comella through licensee IVOX RADIO, LLC, and it broadcasts a talk format. Both KKGX and sister station KWXY have their studios in the original KWXY Broadcast Center building in Cathedral City.

Programming is also heard on 54-watt FM translator K256CU at 99.1 MHz in Palm Springs.

== History ==
=== Early years ===
Logo for the station as KPSI

The station was originally issued the call sign KGEC when it was a construction permit. But as it was being built, it took the call sign KDES on September 6, 1956. KDES signed on the air on October 29, 1956.

The station was assigned the callsign KKAM on October 15, 1984; on August 17, 1987, the station changed its call sign back to KDES. The station became KESQ on June 1, 1994, but returned to the KDES call sign on November 1, 1995. On September 1, 1997, the call letters were changed to KPSI. The callsign KPSI, which stood for "Keeping Palm Springs Informed", was previously used on 1450 AM (later KCOD).

=== Talk programming ===
As a talk station, KPSI's lineup included Rush Limbaugh, Glenn Beck, Dennis Prager, Mark Levin, Dennis Miller, Michael Savage and local host Rich Gilgallon. KPSI was also a member of the Los Angeles Dodgers and Los Angeles Lakers radio networks.

On August 12, 2016, KPSI and sister station KWXY went silent. The stations were put up for sale. In October 2016, Desert Broadcasters agreed to acquire KPSI and KWXY from Ric and Rozene Supple's R&R Radio Corporation.

=== KKGX ===
The call letters were changed to KKGX on February 2, 2017. On March 14, 2017, both KKGX and KWXY returned to the air stunting. The on-air moniker of ‘KGX’ (a truncation of the legal ‘KKGX’ call sign) was a mash-up and homage to legendary three call-letter California radio stations KGO, KNX and KGB. KGX debuted a conservative talk format branded "Real Talk" on March 16. The purchase by Desert Broadcasters was consummated on March 31, 2017.

Effective June 9, 2021, Desert Broadcasters sold KKGX, KWXY and two translators to Louie Comella's Ivox Radio LLC for $105,000 as part of an $8MM dollar media deal with Louie Comella’s Ivox MediaA. The sale included the old KDES (AM) tower site in Palm Springs for $220,000 and the original KWXY "Broadcast Center" building for $550,000. The 920 AM tower site on its 28.4 acres (11.36 ha) was to be expanded to become the new home of the Ivox+ streaming platform as well as a future independent motion picture studio lot and theater venue, although the property lacks public road access. The expansion never took place.

On November 25, 2025, iVox Media filed an application to transfer ownership of KKGX and its translator K256CU to RadioForSale LLC, and an application to modify the coverage area of the translator. The application for ownership change included a Time Brokerage Agreement that took effect on November 1, allowing the new owners to begin programming the station prior to FCC approval of the application.

=== Return to Programming ===
Both stations were off the air for four months beginning in August 2021. At noon on December 12, 2021, they returned to the air with a four-hour special, "Frank Sinatra: Remembering An American Legend," hosted by Wink Martindale. Following the special, both stations began playing Christmas music. On December 27, 2021, KKGX relaunched as "Alternative Talk Radio", abandoning the unique 'KGX' branding, and using only the legal callsign 'KKGX' on-air.

KKGX alternative talk programming hosted the nationally syndicated Clay Travis & Buck Sexton Show, The Glenn Beck Program, Bill O’Rielly, Jesse Jackson, FOX Sports News, ABC News updates, and select Bloomberg News programs.

KKGX’s sports programming lineup included the San Diego Padres, NFL Sundays, and select MLS and Premier League games. KKGX was also part of the FOX Sports overnight radio network.

Music programming included the History of Rock and Roll narrated by Wink Martindale, rebroadcasts of Casey Kasem’s American Top 40, and Wolfman Jack. Local programs included the Joey English Show, Patrick Evans, and The Wink Martindale Show.

=== Current programming ===
Effective May 1, 2024, KKGX commenced a transition from nationally syndicated networks and commercial programming to independent media. Louie Comella entered into agreements to broadcast BBC World Service along with other independent, public, and community radio programming.

KKGX airs programs from American Public Media, the BBC, PRX – Public Radio Exchange, and a range of music programs and live in-studio performances, with independently produced news and culture programs. KKGX is slated to air programming created through IVOX MUSIC, a 24/7 music video channel project created by Louie Comella to support "the music of independent artists," premiering Fall 2025, which includes programs like REEL HUMANS, IVOX RADIO Presents, and the IVOX MUSIC Video Countdown.

KKGX is Palm Springs’ alternative talk radio station, airing BBC news, independent programs, cultural exploration and informed public affairs. From Palm Springs to around the world, KKGX.org.

== Previous logo ==
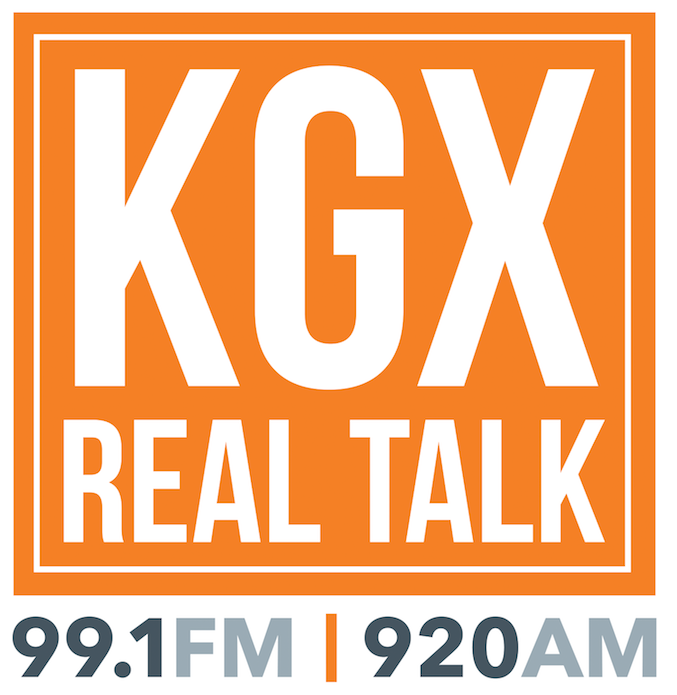
