= KOCP =

Radio station in Oxnard, California

Coordinates: 34.4222°N 119.0354°W

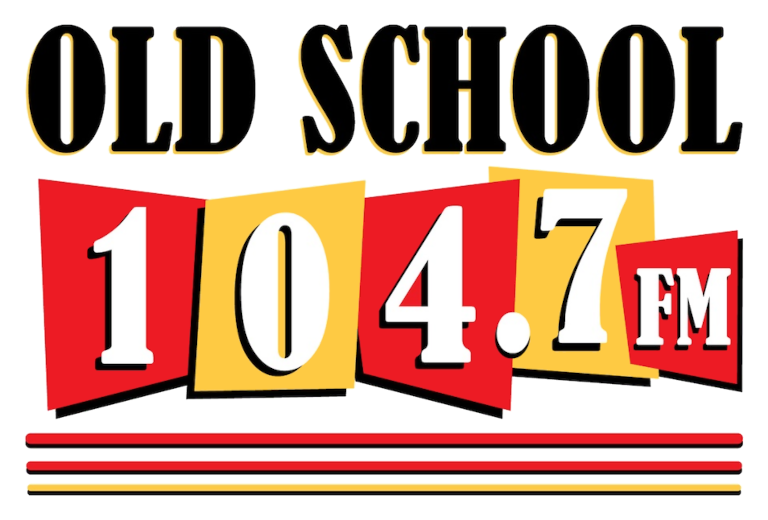
- Oxnard, California; United States
- Broadcast area: Oxnard–Ventura, California; Santa Barbara, California; Los Angeles, California
- Frequency: 104.7 MHz
- Branding: Old School 104.7

Programming
- Format: Rhythmic oldies
- Affiliations: Compass Media Networks

Ownership
- Owner: Gold Coast Broadcasting; (Point Four LLC)
- Sister stations: KCAQ, KFYV, KHHT, KOSJ, KQAV, KQIE, KVEN, KVTA, KWIE, KXFM, KZLA

History
- First air date: September 27, 1958
- Former call signs: KAAR (1958–1964); KPMJ (1964–1978); KACY-FM (1978–1983); KCAQ (1983–2016)
- Call sign meaning: "Octopus" (former classic rock format on 95.9 FM)

Technical information
- Licensing authority: FCC
- Facility ID: 25092
- Class: B
- ERP: 18,000 watts; 4,000 watts (CP)
- HAAT: 252 meters (827 ft)

Links
- Public license information: Public file; LMS
- Webcast: Listen live
- Website: oldschool1047.com

KOCP (104.7 FM, "Old School 104.7") is a commercial radio station that is licensed to Oxnard, California and broadcasts to the Oxnard–Ventura, Los Angeles, and Santa Barbara areas. The station is owned by Gold Coast Broadcasting and airs a rhythmic oldies music format. KOCP is partially simulcast on sister station KQIE in Redlands, California, also at 104.7 FM.

== History ==
=== Early years ===
KOCP was one of the first FM stations to sign on in the Oxnard—Ventura, California radio market, having debuted on September 27, 1958 as KAAR. In 1964, the station changed its call letters to KPMJ and began airing soft rock with the branding "K-105". In 1977, Channel Islands Broadcasting Corporation purchased KPMJ; the following year, the station adopted the call sign KACY-FM to match that of its sister station (now KVEN) and instituted an easy listening format.

=== Q105 (1983–1996) ===
In November 1982, Channel Islands Broadcasting sold KACY-AM-FM to Sunbeam Radio Partnership for $2.59 million. Sunbeam was a joint venture between Sunbeam Television president Edmund Ansin, who owned Miami's NBC affiliate WCKT, and Harold A. Frank, vice president and general manager of WINZ-AM-FM, also based in Miami. Upon the purchase, Frank became the new general manager for the Oxnard stations.

KACY-FM changed its call letters to KCAQ on February 21, 1983. The new station adopted the branding "Q105" and aired a mainstream top 40 format. The original Q105 on-air staff included E. Curtis Johnson in mornings, Johnny Dolan in middays, and Brian Thomas in afternoons. Weeknights were hosted by Gwen Johnson and later Famous Amos who was popular with the teenage demographic; Jay Porter hosted late nights. Dolan was selected as KCAQ's first program director; Thomas would replace him only months later.

KCAQ was an immediate ratings success, climbing to number one with double-digit ratings in both the Arbitron and Birch ratings reports. In the station's first full year as Q105, as measured by Arbitron, the station garnered a share of 11.0 and captured most key demographic groups including teens, adults 18–34, and women 18–49.

In October 1987, Sunbeam Radio Partnership sold KCAQ and its AM sister, then known as KTRO, to Greater Pacific Radio Exchange Ltd., a company owned by Frank, for $4.5 million. As Frank was also the minority partner in Sunbeam Radio at the time, the transaction gave him complete ownership of the station pair. By 1988, KCAQ began evolving towards a "crossover" format (later known as rhythmic contemporary), a top-40 presentation emphasizing upbeat dance music, filling the void left by competitor KMYX when that station flipped formats to country music the following year.

=== Q104.7 (1996–2016) ===
In mid-1996, Greater Pacific Radio Exchange sold KCAQ and KTRO to Gold Coast Broadcasting for $3.65 million. Under the direction of program director Dan Garite, brought over from KOCP (then at 95.9 FM), KCAQ changed its branding to "Q104.7" and began tightening its rhythmic contemporary format. Garite programmed Q104.7 to compete directly with Los Angeles market stations including KPWR (Power 106), dropping mainstream pop in favor of more R&B, hip hop, dance, and rhythmic pop selections. Garite's successful campaign to boost KCAQ's ratings in its home market also included hiring local on-air talent, particularly of Latino heritage, and stressing the station's "805" roots.

Two prominent on-air personalities brought on in 1996 as part of Garite's overhaul of KCAQ are Jaime "Rico" Rangel and Daniel "Mambo" Herrejon. Initially, the two Latino men from Fillmore and Santa Paula, California, respectively, hosted The Rico and Mambo Show weeknights; the station's Arbitron ratings share for that time slot nearly tripled within a year. Soon, Rico and Mambo began hosting Q104.7's morning show, where they led the station to number one in the Oxnard—Ventura radio market. In 2005, the duo left KCAQ to join rival rhythmic contemporary station KVYB (103.3 The Vibe) where they hosted morning drive until June 13, 2008. After being dismissed from KVYB in 2008, Rangel and Herrejon returned to KCAQ on October 5, 2009.

From September 2010 to February 2015, KCAQ was simulcast on sister station KQIE in the Riverside–San Bernardino, California area. That station, like KCAQ, is on the 104.7 FM frequency and was branded as "Q104.7" but aired advertising and promotions targeted to the Inland Empire audience. KQIE later flipped to rhythmic oldies.

=== Old School 104.7 (2016–present) ===
On July 1, 2016 at 7 a.m., KCAQ swapped frequencies with sister station KOCP, moving from 104.7 FM to 95.9 FM. This move brought the KOCP call letters and rhythmic oldies format to 104.7 FM, now rebranded "Old School 104.7". It also marked the return of the format to the Los Angeles market for the first time since KHHT's flip to urban contemporary in February 2015 as KRRL.

KOCP is partially simulcast in the Inland Empire on sister station KQIE, also at 104.7 FM. On October 6, 2017, KOCP began streaming online.

== Transmission notes ==
In the San Gabriel Valley, low-power FM station KQEV-LP in Walnut broadcasts on 104.7 FM. Its signal contour is squeezed in between those of KOCP and KQIE, causing a small gap in transmission between both stations.
