= KVEN =

- Port Hueneme, California; United States
- Broadcast area: Ventura County, California
- Frequency: 1520 kHz
- Branding: La Voz 1520 & 96.3

Programming
- Language: Spanish
- Format: Talk and sports
- Affiliations: TUDN Radio

Ownership
- Owner: Gold Coast Broadcasting; (Gold Coast Broadcasting LLC)
- Sister stations: KCAQ, KFYV, KOCP, KUNX, KVTA

History
- First air date: July 1958
- Former call signs: KYNE (1957–1958, CP); KACY (1958–1984); KTRO (1984–1999); KVTA (1999–2013); KUNX (2013–2015); KKZZ (2015–2022)
- Call sign meaning: "Ventura"

Technical information
- Licensing authority: FCC
- Facility ID: 25091
- Class: B
- Power: 10,000 watts (day); 1,000 watts (night)
- Transmitter coordinates: 34°10′2″N 119°8′5.4″W
- Translator: 96.3 K242CW (Oxnard)

Links
- Public license information: Public file; LMS
- Webcast: Listen live
- Website: lavoz1520.com

KVEN (1520 AM, "La Voz 1520 AM & 96.3 FM") is a commercial radio station licensed to Port Hueneme, California, United States, and serves the Ventura County area. The station is owned by Gold Coast Broadcasting and broadcasts a Spanish-language talk and sports format.

KVEN's signal is audible throughout the daytime up and down the Pacific Coast of California, from San Diego to Santa Barbara. The station's transmitter is sited off East Pleasant Valley Road at Dodge Road in Oxnard. KVEN is also heard on low-power FM translator K242CW at 96.3 MHz in Oxnard.

== History ==
=== KACY ===
The station was first licensed on October 23, 1958, as KYNE. When it finally signed on the following year, the station adopted the call letters KACY. Branded "KACY 152" (pronounced "Kay-cee one-fifty-two"), it broadcast a top 40 format and used the slogan "Boss of the Beach". KACY was one of the first stations to broadcast the weekly countdown show American Top 40 when it debuted in 1970. In 1971, program director Bill Tanner adjusted the station's format from a simple top 40 playlist to a mix of current hits, older songs, and album tracks.

Several KACY disc jockeys went on to greater prominence in their subsequent careers. During KACY's first few years on the air, Robert W. Morgan (at the time known on-air as Bob Morgan) hosted a live nightly program at the now-defunct Wagon Wheel Bowl in Oxnard before becoming a famed "Boss Jock" at KHJ in Los Angeles. "Shotgun" Tom Kelly was also heard on KACY in the early 1970s (as Bobby "Shotgun" McCallister); later, he moved on to major markets such as San Diego (appearing on KGB-FM and KCBQ) and Los Angeles (heard on KRTH as recently as 2016). TV host Bob Eubanks is another notable former KACY 152 DJ.

In June 1976, Dellar Broadcasting sold KACY to CTW Communications — a subsidiary of New York City-based Children's Television Workshop, producer of Sesame Street — for $866,000. Three years later, on May 3, 1979, CTW Communications sold KACY and its FM sister station (now KOCP) to Channel Islands Radio Co. for $1.69 million.

In November 1982, Channel Islands Broadcasting sold KACY/KACY-FM to Sunbeam Radio Partnership for $2.59 million. Sunbeam Radio was a joint venture of two Miami-based businessmen: Edmund Ansin, president of WCKT parent Sunbeam Television, and Harold A. Frank, vice president and general manager of WINZ-AM-FM; Frank became the new general manager of the Oxnard stations.

During its KACY era, the station increased daytime power to 50,000 watts. Later, the daytime power was rolled back to the previous 10,000 watts. The nighttime power remains unchanged at 1,000 watts.

=== KTRO ===
On September 10, 1984, KACY changed its call letters to KTRO and flipped to a Spanish-language format known as "Radio Tiro". During that period, instead of jingles, the sound effect of a pistol firing was used out of commercial breaks into music (tiro being the Spanish word for "bullet").

In October 1987, Sunbeam Radio Partnership sold KTRO and its FM sister station, then called KCAQ, to Greater Pacific Radio Exchange Inc., a company owned by Harold Frank, for $5 million. As Hal was also the minority partner in Sunbeam Radio, the transaction gave him complete ownership of the station pair.

=== KVTA ===
In mid-1996, Greater Pacific Radio Exchange sold KTRO and KCAQ to Gold Coast Broadcasting for $3.65 million. The new owner immediately dropped the Spanish programming and switched to a news/talk format in English. Three years later, on February 15, 1999, KTRO changed its call letters to KVTA and became the new home of competitor KVEN (1450 AM)'s news team, led by the latter's longtime morning hosts Dave Ciniero and Bob Adams.

KVTA had been operating at reduced power under special temporary authority (STA) from the Federal Communications Commission (FCC) starting in 2011 due to engineering problems. On April 15 of that year, the station discovered that one of the monitoring points for its antenna system had gone over the limit prescribed in its license; nighttime power was reduced to 648 watts while they cause was investigated. However, before the problem could be corrected, a farmer plowing on land adjacent to the KVTA transmitter site mistakenly crossed a boundary and tore up at least half of the ground wiring for one of the three towers used for KVTA's daytime antenna pattern. This incident required the station to reduce daytime power to 4,600 watts and nighttime power further, to 136 watts. As of January 8, 2013, KVTA had not completed repairs and requested an extension of the STA.

On July 31, 2012, two hosts of brokered-time real estate shows that were broadcast on KVTA, Kenneth A. Powell and Kathryn "Katie" Rose, were sentenced to lengthy prison terms for perpetrating a Ponzi scheme type of fraud. Radio stations that air programming of this sort are usually held harmless if the broadcasters who buy time on their facilities are not directly tied to ownership.

=== KUNX/KKZZ ===
Gold Coast Broadcasting orchestrated a three-way format shuffle among its AM stations in early 2013. In February, KUNX (1590 AM) began simulcasting KVTA, announcing that all programs would be moving to 1590 AM because of its stronger signal and that listeners should reprogram presets accordingly. On March 6, 2013, KVTA and KUNX swapped frequencies, sending the KVTA calls and news/talk format to 1590 AM while KUNX moved to 1520 AM.

On January 21, 2015, KUNX went silent. While silent, KUNX changed its call letters to KKZZ. On January 21, 2016, KKZZ returned to the air with a regional Mexican format as "La Super K 1520 AM". In June, the station adopted a variety format consisting of adult standards. In November 2018, KKZZ dropped standards and began airing a rhythmic contemporary format as a simulcast of KCAQ.

In August 2019, KKZZ broke away from the KCAQ simulcast and adopted a Spanish-language news/talk format with the branding "La Voz". On September 9, 2019, the station added programming from TUDN Radio as an affiliate of the Spanish-language sports radio network.

The station changed call signs to KVEN on May 20, 2022. A previous station known as KVEN operated at 1450 AM in Ventura from 1948 to 2021.
