= KZLA =

- Riverdale, California; United States
- Broadcast area: Fresno-Visalia, California
- Frequency: 98.3 MHz

Programming
- Format: Rhythmic oldies

Ownership
- Owner: Riverdale Broadcasting, LLC
- Sister stations: KOCP, KOSJ, KQAV, KQIE, KWIE (FM), KXFM

History
- First air date: 2003
- Former call signs: KHRN (2000–2006)

Technical information
- Licensing authority: FCC
- Facility ID: 86866
- Class: B1
- ERP: 25,000 watts
- HAAT: 76 meters (249 ft)
- Transmitter coordinates: 36°36′28″N 119°59′49″W
- Translator: 101.7 K269FA (Huron)

Links
- Public license information: Public file; LMS
- Website: oldschool983.com

KZLA (98.3 FM, "Old School 98.3") is a radio station licensed to Riverdale, California, United States, broadcasting a Rhythmic oldies format. The station is owned by Riverdale Broadcasting, LLC. Programming is also heard over low-power FM translator K269FA (101.7 FM) in Huron, California.

== History ==
The station was assigned the KHRN call letters by the Federal Communications Commission on June 15, 2000. On September 5, 2006, the station changed its call sign to the current KZLA.

The KZLA call sign had previously belonged to Emmis Communications for a country music station in Los Angeles; on August 17, 2006, the country format was replaced and in September the call sign was changed. More details of that station's history are at KLLI (FM) "Cali 93.9".

KZLA would go silent in August 2025.
