= KRUZ (FM) =

Radio station in Santa Barbara, California

Coordinates: 34.525°N 119.960°W

- Santa Barbara, California; United States
- Broadcast area: Santa Barbara-Oxnard-Ventura; Santa Maria-Lompoc-San Luis Obispo
- Frequency: 103.3 MHz
- Branding: KRUZ 103.3

Programming
- Format: Classic hits

Ownership
- Owner: Cumulus Media; (Cumulus Licensing LLC)
- Sister stations: KBBY-FM, KHAY, KVYB

History
- First air date: April 18, 1961
- Former call signs: KMUZ (1961–1972); KRUZ (1972–2005); KMGQ (2005); KKSB (2005); KVYB (2005–2019)
- Call sign meaning: A play on the term "cruise"

Technical information
- Licensing authority: FCC
- Facility ID: 8853
- Class: B
- ERP: 105,000 watts
- HAAT: 905 meters (2,969 ft)

Links
- Public license information: Public file; LMS
- Webcast: Listen live; Listen live; Listen live (via iHeartRadio)
- Website: kruz1033.com

KRUZ (103.3 FM, "KRUZ 103.3") is a commercial radio station licensed to Santa Barbara, California, United States, and serving Santa Barbara, Ventura, and San Luis Obispo counties. Owned by Cumulus Media, it features a classic hits format. The station's studios are located on Walter Street, off U.S. Route 101 in Ventura.

Its transmitter is atop Broadcast Peak north of Santa Barbara in the Santa Ynez Mountains at a height above average terrain (HAAT) of 905 meters (2,969 ft). These factors give KRUZ one of the largest coverage areas of any FM station in the United States. KRUZ broadcasts in analog only, not airing an HD Radio digital signal. However, on February 16, 2021, the station began to carry RDS information.

== History ==
=== KMUZ (1961–1971) ===
The station signed on the air on April 18, 1961. Its original call sign was KMUZ. It had been owned by William H. Buckley, doing business as Tri-Counties Communications Inc.

The station had a beautiful music format, playing soft instrumental cover versions of popular adult songs. The studios were on State Street in Santa Barbara.

=== KRUZ First Generation (1972–2005) ===
On June 18, 1970, Tri-Counties Communications sold KMUZ to The Schuele Organization Inc. for $106,500. Company president Carl Schuele was previously an owner and president of Broadcast Time Sales, a radio station consulting firm. The new owner continued the easy listening format but changed the call letters to KRUZ two years later. The Schuele Organization owned KRUZ for nearly a quarter century, selling it in October 1995 to Pacific Coast Communications Inc. for $3 million. The easy listening format added more vocals and gradually transitioned to adult contemporary (AC). The tempo picked up over the 1990s and KRUZ adopted a hot AC format full-time in 1996.

In December 1999, Pacific Coast Communications sold KRUZ to Cumulus Media for $10 million. This transaction, combined with a concurrent purchase of McDonald Media Group's eight stations, marked Cumulus' debut on the West Coast.

=== KVYB (2005–2019) ===
In March 2005, Cumulus Media shuffled the formats of the stations within its Santa Barbara cluster. KRUZ's hot AC format moved to 97.5 FM, a frequency then occupied by smooth jazz station KMGQ, with the KRUZ call letters soon to follow. This paved the way for the launch of KVYB (103.3 The Vibe), the Santa Barbara market's first Hispanic-targeted rhythmic contemporary outlet. KVYB also marked the return of top 40 radio to the area after KIST-FM flipped to modern rock in 2003.

Initially, KVYB's musical direction had featured Hispanic rhythmic artists as well as bilingual on-air personalities. The Vibe's first slogan "Hip Hop Y Mas" reflected the station's multicultural flavor. Among the DJs hired to launch KVYB are Jaime "Rico" Rangel and Daniel "Mambo" Herrejon, two Latino men who hosted the morning show at rhythmic contemporary competitor KCAQ (Q104.7) in Ventura. While at KCAQ, the duo took the station to number one in the Arbitron ratings in the Oxnard—Ventura market. They left in 2005 and brought The Rico and Mambo Show to KYVB, with Herrejon doubling as the new station's first programming director.

In 2008, 103.3 The Vibe adjusted its format to a conventional rhythmic top 40 presentation. Rangel and Herrejon were dismissed June 13; they returned to KCAQ the following year.

=== KRUZ (2019–present) ===
On June 28, 2019, KVYB changed its call letters back to KRUZ in preparation for a format flip. The following day, KRUZ began stunting with clips of 1980s events, movies, video games, and songs. Teasing the return of the KRUZ call letters, the montage announced that a new format would surface July 1 at 8 a.m., using snippets of such songs as "Cruisin'" by Smokey Robinson, "1985" by Bowling for Soup, and "California Love" by 2Pac. The Vibe moved to 106.3 FM, replacing the classic hip hop format on that frequency and adjusting its own presentation from rhythmic contemporary to mainstream top 40.

On July 1, 2019 at 8 a.m., KRUZ ended stunting and launched a classic hits format as "KRUZ 103.3." The first song played was "Footloose" by Kenny Loggins.

== Signal coverage ==
KRUZ's signal blankets the Coastal California counties of Santa Barbara, Ventura, and San Luis Obispo. It can also be heard in parts of Los Angeles and Kern counties, as far north as San Lucas, and occasionally as far south as San Diego County.

This is due to the station's 105,000-watt signal and 905-meter (2,969 ft) antenna (HAAT). This configuration was grandfathered in when the Federal Communications Commission established limits on effective radiated power in 1962. Those limits were enacted a year after the station's debut.
