= KUNX =

Coordinates: 34°19′48″N 119°05′34.4″W

- Santa Paula, California; United States
- Broadcast area: Ventura County, California
- Frequency: 1400 kHz
- Branding: Radio Bronco 1400 AM & 102.5 FM

Programming
- Language: Spanish
- Format: Regional Mexican

Ownership
- Owner: Gold Coast Broadcasting; (Gold Coast Broadcasting LLC)
- Sister stations: KCAQ, KFYV, KOCP, KVEN, KVTA

History
- First air date: 1948
- Former call signs: KSPA (1948–1966); KQIQ (1966–1971); KAAP (1971–1980, 1983–1987); KKBZ (1980–1983); KCZN (1987–1989); KZTR (1989–1991) KKZZ (1991–2004, 2008–2015); KUNX (2004–2008)

Technical information
- Licensing authority: FCC
- Facility ID: 70562
- Class: C
- Power: 1,000 watts
- Translator: 102.5 MHz K273CT (Oxnard, California)

Links
- Public license information: Public file; LMS
- Website: goldcoastbroadcasting.com

KUNX (1400 AM) is a commercial radio station licensed to Santa Paula, California, United States, and serving Ventura County. The station broadcasts in the Spanish language, carrying a regional Mexican music format branded as "Radio Bronco 1400 AM & 102.5 FM". KUNX is owned by Gold Coast Broadcasting LLC. The station is rebroadcast on FM translator station K273CT (102.5 MHz) in Oxnard, California.

== History ==
The station first signed on in 1948 as KSPA. In August 1966, station owner Franklin James sold KSPA to Rancho Broadcasting, owned by television engineer William F. Wallace, for $120,000. The following year, the station changed its call sign to KQIQ and adopted a country music format, later switching to top 40. In January 1974, the station changed its call letters to KAAP, flipping to an all-news format by the end of 1975. Rancho Broadcasting signed on an FM sister station, KAAP-FM (96.7 FM), in 1976. The company sold KAAP-AM-FM for $1.2 million in late 1980.

During the 1990s, the station was known as KKZZ and broadcast an adult standards format.

In February 2013, KKZZ began airing Radio Fórmula, a Mexican talk network. In March 2017, it added an FM translator station at the 102.5 FM frequency. In May 2017, KUNX flipped to a regional Mexican music format with the moniker and the brand name "La Super X". On September 1, 2017, the station adopted the "Radio Bronco" branding.
