= Rhythmic oldies =

Radio format

Rhythmic oldies is a radio format that concentrates on the rhythmic, R&B, disco, or dance genres of music. The playlists spans from the 1960s through the 2000s. They depend on market conditions and may be designed for African-American or Hispanic audiences. It is also referred to as "Jammin' Oldies" or "Music From Back in the Day" by various radio stations. Since the late 2000s, much of the library in the "rhythmic oldies" format has been adopted by the classic hits format. A variation on the format is "urban oldies".

== History ==
On November 19, 1997, the Los Angeles radio station formerly known as KIBB began a new concept in radio. KCMG, which named itself Mega 100.3 after a listener contest, was "oldies with attitude". Chancellor Media, later to be called AMFM, developed the format with the intention of using it on other stations. Just as radio in the 80s had the "urban versus churban" competition, R & B oldies radio was dividing into two camps—the straight urban oldies stations targeting African Americans, and the "Jammin' Oldies" stations with a wider audience that included both blacks and whites. On Jammin' Oldies radio, DJs were often mostly white or a variety of racial groups. Many of the songs played had crossed over to top 40 radio, while R&B stations continued to play more hits, including ballads, not familiar to top 40 fans, especially if those songs were not singles. Some of the rhythmic stations played songs completely unrelated to R & B; "Mony Mony" by Tommy James on the now defunct WFJO in Tampa was one example, though this station dropped such songs eventually.

Another version of the format was "Groovin' Oldies", as in the case of WGRV in Detroit. This station switched from modern rock in April 1999, calling itself "The Groove". This format lasted until a switch to adult contemporary in June 2001. The last song was "End of the Road" by Boyz II Men.

In April 1999, WGAY in Washington, D.C., switched to "Jammin' Oldies", which had been successful in every market where it was tried. One reason was that the format was tailored to each specific market. In Los Angeles, the format leaned toward Latin music. Other markets included Fresno, Chicago, and New York City. Listeners changed from urban contemporary and other types of oldies stations. Most of the music came from the 70s, but there were also 60s and 80s hits. Unlike most radio formats, Jammin' Oldies did not target one specific ethnic or gender group. Black and white artists were included, and a slight majority of listeners were female. WJMO "Jammin' Oldies 99.5" succeeded at first, but two years later fell victim to a declining economy. Another problem for "Jammin' Oldies" was that it was the "hot new format" in 1998, but there were other "hot new formats" in 2000.

In Chicago, it was rocker WRCX that changed—to WUBT "103-5 The Beat". The result was a significant ratings improvement that resulted from adding pop artists such as Madonna, the Bee Gees and Tina Turner to what had been old school urban oldies. But the deregulation of radio in 1996 made consolidation a priority. This meant companies were looking at operating groups of stations rather than at individual stations they owned. Clear Channel bought AMFM, and in 2001 WUBT became top 40 WKSC-FM.

In New York City, Chancellor Media decided to convert a station it had been having trouble formatting for some time. As 1998 began, the company had just bought WNSR-FM, with initially a modern adult contemporary format that evolved to a cross between its sister station WLTW and the Hot AC format which was being used by WPLJ at the time. In January 1998, Chancellor changed the call letters to WBIX, rebranded the station as "Big 105", and steered it more toward the Hot AC format of WPLJ. Eleven months later, with zero improvement in the ratings, WBIX was flipped to the Jammin' Oldies format and became WTJM. The difference from competitor WRKS was described this way by Airplay Monitor editor Sean Ross:

TV spots feature former New York mayor Ed Koch, not exactly someone you expect to emerge from the P-Funk mother ship.

Music director Wayne Mayo had held the same job at WRKS in New York City and at KISQ in San Francisco. By 2002, the station flipped to Urban Contemporary.

Early success stories included KMEZ in Louisiana, WRBO in Memphis, XHRM-FM in San Diego and KTXQ in Dallas, as well as KFMK in Austin, KISQ in San Francisco, and KNRX in Kansas City. Contrary to what one might expect, competition from oldies and urban adult contemporary had little effect on ratings.

The format proved to be little more than a "passing fad", one that stations got excited about but listeners did not—or when they did, not for very long.

In November 2000, WOCL in Orlando, KHZZ in Sacramento, and WBBT-FM in Richmond changed several weeks after WGFX in Nashville left the format. But the format was still successful in some markets—KCMG in Los Angeles, WJJJ in Pittsburgh, KDJM in Denver, WMOJ in Cincinnati and KMGV in Fresno all went up in the Summer 2000 ratings (in fact, KMGV was no. 1 with listeners in the 25–54 group). Joining the format in October 2000 was KMBX in Seattle.

Some in radio believed that Jammin' Oldies tried to target too many types of listeners. R & B oldies stations specifically targeting African American listeners were doing better than Jammin' Oldies--WWSO in Norfolk, KMEZ, and WRBO. Other stations of this type included WNPL in Nashville and WPLZ in Richmond. Former KCMG program director Don Parker said a mass-appeal format would not do as well as one that targeted a specific ethnic group (his station went after Hispanics despite requests to add more disco). Consultant Barry Mayo also said targeting blacks was a good strategy.

By 2000, Jammin' Oldies stations had different approaches, with some playing only 60s and 70s music, and others focusing more on the 80s, with still others such as WMOJ playing early rap. KMBX played no 60s music, while WJJJ (which was co-owned with oldies WWSW) added songs from the 80s and 90s and de-emphasized Motown. WUBT program director Jay Beau Jones said stations that ventured into the 90s probably should not be considered oldies.

WEJM in Philadelphia was one of the stations with older music dominant. Still, some radio program directors did not like using the term "oldies" even for these stations.

Other stations emphasizing older music were WJMO and WZJM in Cleveland. By contrast, WFJO played nothing from the 1960s, and WZMX in Hartford played few songs from before 1970.

In some markets, Jammin' Oldies should never have been tried, in the opinion of Infinity Broadcasting senior vice president John Gehron. Former AMFM Chief Programming Officer Steve Rivers said the format was tried when conventional oldies was not succeeding, but this turned out to be a mistake. Rivers also said that with the format's phenomenal success, expectations might have been too high, but some stations experienced success like they had not in the past.

Smaller-market stations such as KHZZ found it hard to achieve the numbers found in the big cities. KHZZ experienced competition from former oldies station KHYL, but both stations ended up giving up the format, with KHZZ turning to oldies and in 2000, KHYL shifted towards Urban AC, branded at "V101.1".

By 2002, numerous stations were changing to R&B and dance music. In addition to WTJM, which switched its call letters to WWPR and became an urban contemporary station, format pioneer KCMG (which became KHHT) was playing newer hits, along with WJMR in Milwaukee and KMJK in Kansas City, Missouri. Greg Love, the program director in charge of switching KMJK to Jammin' Oldies, said the format began to lose its appeal because people got excited to hear the songs, and then they were no longer special. Wayne Mayo said hits were chosen from too narrow a time period. WJMR program director Lauri Jones said people listened to several stations, and that when she worked in Minneapolis, she observed that her station was no longer the primary choice of many listeners.

KHHT program director Michelle Santosousso said many R&B stations were focusing on rap, and the more adult hits were hard to find. This led to a change not only in musical style but also target audience. Jones said Jammin' Oldies stations went from 70% white and 30% black, to 70% black and 30% white. Love and Mayo both said there were black listeners, and now the stations had to focus on that audience. Santosousso, on the other hand, said the number of ethnic groups in Los Angeles required a different approach. Jones said the term "old school" replaced "classic soul", while Love said "old school" had to go. Love also said The Isley Brothers, Barry White and The Temptations were recording new music, and an oldies station could not play those. But listeners wanted to hear them.

In late 2012, Clear Channel Radio announced a new Rhythmic Oldies format for KOGO-FM in San Diego, which had been stunting with Christmas music. It features a broad mix of mainstream dance and pop hits (with musicians such as Donna Summer and Mariah Carey), with soft rock musicians like George Michael, Hall and Oates, and Elton John mixed in. However, due to low ratings, the station shifted to Rhythmic Adult Contemporary with its playlist shifting towards 1990's, 2000's and current material.

On February 6, 2015, KHHT—Los Angeles, the successor to the first rhythmic oldies station, KCMG, flipped to urban contemporary, returning that format to the 92.3 FM dial position for the first time since 2000. Legendary Los Angeles radio personality Art Laboe, whose show was carried at nights on KHHT, later moved to KDAY. Since the demise of KHHT, a few stations in the suburban areas in and around Los Angeles have flipped to the format, including KQIE in the Inland Empire, KOCP in Ventura, and KQAV in the Antelope Valley.

== List of radio stations airing the rhythmic/urban oldies format ==
- KQIE - Redlands, California
- KOCP - Oxnard, California
- KQAV - Rosamond, California
- KMGV - Fresno, California
- KZLA - Riverdale, California
- KOKO-FM - Kerman, California
- KKBB - Bakersfield, California
- KMRJ - Palm Springs, California
- KXFM - Santa Maria, California
- KOSJ - Santa Barbara, California
- KWIE - Barstow, California
- KAJM - Phoenix, Arizona (leans "Rhythmic AC")
- KJHM-FM - Denver, Colorado (leans "Rhythmic AC")
- KWRP - Pueblo, Colorado
- KUMU-FM - Honolulu, Hawaii (leans "Rhythmic AC")
- WKXB - Wilmington, North Carolina
- W275BK - Atlanta, Georgia
- WPPZ-FM - Philadelphia, Pennsylvania
- WNBU - New Bern, North Carolina
- WOKS - Columbus, Georgia
- KOCN - Salinas, California (leans "Rhythmic AC")
- WMMJ - Washington, DC (Leans Urban AC)
- WDCJ - Prince Frederick, MD (Leans Urban AC)
- WOSL - Cincinnati, Ohio (Leans Urban AC)
- WVOL - Berry Hill, Tennessee
- KTIP - Porterville, California

== List of radio stations formerly airing the format ==
- KISQ - San Francisco
- KCMG/KHHT - Los Angeles
- KRLA - Los Angeles, California
- WTJM - New York, New York
- WUBT - Chicago, Illinois
- WWYW - Dundee, Illinois
- KTXQ - Fort Worth - Dallas
- KSOC - Dallas, Texas
- KTJM - Houston, Texas
- KYOK - Houston, Texas
- WJMO - Washington, D.C.
- WALR-FM - Atlanta, Georgia
- WTZA - Atlanta, Georgia
- XHRM - Tijuana, Baja California (shifted to Rhythmic AC in 2013)
- WEJM - Philadelphia, Pennsylvania
- WDAS (AM) - Philadelphia, Pennsylvania
- WRNB - Philadelphia, Pennsylvania
- KYOT-FM - Phoenix, Arizona
- KHOT - Phoenix, Arizona
- KDJM - Broomfield, Colorado
- KBTB - Seattle
- WFJO - Tampa, Florida
- WMGE - Miami, Florida
- KSSX - Carlsbad, California
- WGRV - Detroit, Michigan
- WGVX - Minneapolis, Minnesota
- KSGS - Minneapolis, Minnesota
- KFVR - Salt Lake City, Utah
- WZTI - Milwaukee, Wisconsin
- WJMR - Milwaukee, Wisconsin
- WJJJ - Pittsburgh, Pennsylvania
- WZUM - Pittsburgh, Pennsylvania
- WZJM - Cleveland Heights, Ohio
- WOSL - Cincinnati, Ohio
- WMOJ - Cincinnati, Ohio
- WDBZ - Cincinnati, Ohio
- KNRX - Kansas City, Missouri
- WFNZ-FM - Charlotte, North Carolina
- KFMK - Austin, Texas
- WBKS - Indianapolis, Indiana
- WGLD - Indianapolis, Indiana
- WZMX - Hartford, Connecticut
- WSCQ - Columbia, South Carolina
- KMMG - Albuquerque, New Mexico
- KQBT - Albuquerque, New Mexico
- WOCL - Orlando, Florida
- KHYL - Sacramento, California
- KHZZ - Sacramento, California
- WYSR - Fort Wayne, Indiana
- WFUN-FM - St. Louis, Missouri
- WENN - Birmingham, Alabama
- WBBT-FM - Richmond, Virginia
- WPLZ - Richmond, Virginia
- WWSO - Suffolk, Virginia
- WNPL - Nashville, Tennessee
- WGFX - Nashville, Tennessee
- WGVN - Lexington, Kentucky
- KTFM - San Antonio, Texas
- KCJZ - San Antonio, Texas
- WTKN - Murrells Inlet, South Carolina
- KOCN - Pacific Grove, California
- KHLR - Benton, Arkansas
- WBUF - Buffalo, New York
- WLCL - Rochester, New York
- CKDX-FM - Toronto, Ontario
- KOQL - Ashland, Missouri
- KMOQ - Joplin, Missouri
- KGGN - Reno, Nevada
- WDJO - Dayton, Ohio
- WLOR - Huntsville, Alabama
- WVVE - Panama City, Florida
- KQOD - Stockton, California (shifted to classic hip hop)
- KMGW - Yakima, Washington
- KRTO - Guadalupe, California
- KOAS - Las Vegas, Nevada
- WATV - Birmingham, Alabama
- WRBO - Memphis, Tennessee
- KMEZ - New Orleans, Louisiana
- KTYL-FM - Tyler, Texas
- WIIN - Jackson, Mississippi
- "Solid Gold Soul" - syndicated by ABC Radio
- "Groovin' Oldies" - syndicated by Westwood One
