= KQEV-LP =

Coordinates: 34.0650°N 117.8462°W

- Walnut, California; United States
- Broadcast area: San Gabriel Valley
- Frequency: 104.7 MHz
- Branding: KQEV-LP 104.7

Programming
- Format: Chinese ethnic

Ownership
- Owner: Chinese Sound of Oriental and West Heritage

History
- First air date: 2015
- Call sign meaning: Keeping the Quality of Economy Valuables

Technical information
- Licensing authority: FCC
- Facility ID: 196455
- Class: L1
- ERP: 29 watts
- HAAT: 43.6 meters (143 ft)

Links
- Public license information: LMS
- Webcast: Listen Live
- Website: KQEV-LP

KQEV-LP (104.7 MHz) is a low-power FM radio station licensed to Walnut, California. The station is owned by Chinese Sound of Oriental and West Heritage in Carson, California and airs a Chinese-language ethnic format.
