= KCOD =

- Palm Springs, California; United States
- Broadcast area: Coachella Valley
- Frequency: 1450 kHz

Ownership
- Owner: College of the Desert; (Desert Community College District d/b/a College of the Desert)

History
- First air date: 1954
- Last air date: August 6, 2020
- Former call signs: KPAL (1954–1971); KPSI (1971–1997); KGAM (1997–2010); KPTR (2010–2017)
- Call sign meaning: College of the Desert

Technical information
- Facility ID: 35496
- Class: C
- Power: 960 watts
- Transmitter coordinates: 33°48′7″N 116°27′44″W
- Translator: 99.9 K260DE (Palm Desert)

KCOD (1450 AM) was a radio station licensed to Palm Springs, California, United States. It served the Coachella Valley area. The station was last owned by College of the Desert. Programming was also simulcast on translator station K260DE (99.9 FM) in Palm Desert.

The transmitter and broadcast tower were located between Palm Springs and Cathedral City on Dinah Shore Drive. According to the Antenna Structure Registration database, the tower was 52 m (171 ft) tall.

== History ==
The station began broadcasting in 1954, and held the call sign KPAL. On February 9, 1971, its call sign was changed to KPSI. KPSI aired a middle of the road (MOR) format in the 1970s. By 1983, the station had adopted a talk format.

On September 1, 1997, its call sign was changed to KGAM and on September 15, it adopted an adult standards format. In 1998, talk programming was added during the day and it eventually returned to a full-time news-talk format, airing syndicated talk shows, with hosts such as Michael Savage, G. Gordon Liddy, and Dave Ramsey. It also aired CNN Headline News and Thru the Bible with J. Vernon McGee mornings and broadcast Los Angeles Lakers, Angels, and Oakland Raiders games.

On February 2, 2010, the station's call sign was changed to KPTR, and it became a progressive talk station, a format and call sign transferred from 1340 AM (which became KWXY). R & R donated KPTR to College of the Desert on November 1, 2016. The college elected to operate the station as a noncommercial station; in preparation for the change, R & R took KPTR silent on July 10, 2016. The progressive talk format was relocated to KWXY; that station would go silent as well one month later.

KPTR changed its call letters to KCOD on January 8, 2017; in a December 2016 filing with the Federal Communications Commission (FCC), College of the Desert said that it would return the station to the air by April. The station resumed broadcasting May 27, 2017. College of the Desert had already operated KCOD since 2011 as an Internet radio station from studios on the college's campus in Palm Desert; in 2018, KCOD moved to the adjacent former KEZN studios.

After having been silent since August 6, 2020, KCOD and K260DE's licenses were surrendered on August 2, 2021, and were cancelled the following day.

== Translator ==
Broadcast translator for KCOD
Call sign	Frequency	City of license	FID	ERP (W)	Class	Transmitter coordinates	FCC info
DK260DE	99.9 FM	Palm Desert, California	200930	50	D	33°44′0.3″N 116°23′5.7″W	LMS
