= KCAQ =

Radio station in Camarillo–Ventura, California

- Camarillo, California; United States
- Broadcast area: Ventura County; Santa Barbara
- Frequency: 95.9 MHz
- Branding: Q95.9

Programming
- Format: Rhythmic contemporary
- Affiliations: United Stations Radio Networks

Ownership
- Owner: Gold Coast Broadcasting; (Gold Coast Broadcasting LLC)
- Sister stations: KFYV, KOCP, KUNX, KVEN, KVTA

History
- First air date: August 15, 1972
- Former call signs: KEWE (1972–1977); KGAB (1977–1982); KZTR (1982–1991); KELF (1991–1995); KOCP (1995–2016)
- Call sign meaning: California Q

Technical information
- Licensing authority: FCC
- Facility ID: 70563
- Class: B1
- ERP: 1,200 watts
- HAAT: 444 meters (1,457 ft)
- Transmitter coordinates: 34.3486°N 119.3379°W

Links
- Public license information: Public file; LMS
- Webcast: Listen Live
- Website: q959.fm

KCAQ (95.9 FM, "Q95.9") is a commercial radio station that is licensed to Camarillo, California and serves the Ventura County area. The station is owned by Gold Coast Broadcasting and airs a rhythmic contemporary format. KCAQ was simulcast on sister station KKZZ (1520 AM) in Port Hueneme until August 2019.

== History ==
=== Early years ===
The station at 95.9 FM began broadcasting on August 15, 1972 as KEWE with an automated soft rock format. Five years later, the station changed its call sign to KGAB and flipped to an album-oriented rock format known as "B96". In 1982, KGAB adopted the call letters KZTR and an adult contemporary format known as "K-Star". The station flipped to classic rock in 1987 with the branding "96ZTR".

In September 1988, Gold Coast Communications Corp. sold KZTR and AM sister station KCZN to Golden Bear Broadcasting Inc. for $1,967,500. This amount is comparable to the sum of the two stations' previous individual purchase prices in 1985 and 1986, respectively. Three years later, on July 10, 1991, the station changed its call letters to KELF to reflect its new regional Mexican music format branded "El Elefante".

=== KOCP (1995–2016) ===
On October 21, 1994, Gold Coast Broadcasting (not to be confused with the aforementioned Gold Coast Communications) purchased KELF and KKZZ from Golden Bear Broadcasting for $1.2 million. The following February, the station adopted the KOCP call letters and launched a classic rock format known as "95.9 The Octopus". Notable talent included Jeff Duran, who hosted the Duran Show in 2010.

On August 25, 2010, KOCP flipped to classic hits, identifying as "Rewind 95.9". The first song on Rewind was "Wanna Be Startin' Somethin'" by Michael Jackson. On August 29, 2014, KOCP adopted a rhythmic oldies format with the branding "Old School 95.9".

=== KCAQ (2016–present) ===
On July 1, 2016, KOCP swapped frequencies with sister station KCAQ, moving from 95.9 FM to 104.7 FM. This move brought the KCAQ call letters and rhythmic contemporary format to the 95.9 FM frequency, now rebranded "Q95.9".

On September 11, 2017, KCAQ began airing the nationally syndicated Tino Cochino Radio program originating from KKFR in Phoenix. From November 2018 to August 2019, KCAQ was simulcast on KKZZ (1520 AM), which dropped its adult standards format.

== Transmission issues ==
KCAQ operates on the same frequency as KAIA, a Class A station in La Mirada, California. The two stations are short spaced to each other as the cities they are licensed to serve are 63 miles (101 km) apart. Under Federal Communications Commission (FCC) rules, the minimum distance between Class A and Class B1 stations operating on the same channel is 89 miles (143 km). As such, the station competes for signal strength along the outer edge of its broadcast area, particularly in the San Fernando Valley. This interference makes both signals generally unable to be received clearly in much of northwestern Los Angeles County.
