= KTPI =

KTPI may refer to:

- Party for National Unity and Solidarity (Kerukanan Tulodo Pranatan Ingit, KTPI), Suriname
- KTPI-FM, a radio station (97.7 FM) licensed to Mojave, California, US
- KTPI (AM), a radio station (1340 AM) licensed to Mojave, California, US

== See also ==
- KPTI (disambiguation)
