= KAVC =

KAVC may refer to:

- Mecklenburg-Brunswick Regional Airport in South Hill, Virginia (ICAO code KAVC)
- KAVC-LD, a low-power television station (channel 27, virtual 48) licensed to serve Denver, Colorado, United States
- KAVC, former call sign for KTPI (AM) in Mojave, California
- KAVC, a former call sign for KVVS in Rosamond, California
