= KBET =

KBET may refer to:

- KBET (AM), a radio station (790 AM) licensed to Winchester, Nevada, United States
- KIIS (defunct), a defunct radio station (850 AM) formerly licensed to serve Thousand Oaks, California, United States, which held the call sign KBET from 1999 to 2000
- KHTS (AM), a radio station (1220 AM) licensed to Canyon Country, California, United States, which used the call sign KBET from September 1988 to August 1999
- KXTV, a television station (Channel 10) licensed to Sacramento, California, which formerly used the call sign KBET-TV
