= KAVS =

KAVS may refer to:

- KAVS-LP, a low-power radio station (93.9 FM) licensed to Fallon, Nevada, United States
- KTPI-FM, a radio station (97.7 FM) licensed to Mojave, California, United States, which held the call sign KAVS from August 1985 to August 2000
- The King's Award for Voluntary Service, awarded to voluntary organisations in the United Kingdom

== See also ==
- Cavs, a nickname for the Cleveland Cavaliers of the National Basketball Association
