= KHTS =

KHTS may refer to:

- KHTS (AM), a radio station (1220 AM) licensed to Canyon Country, California, United States
- KHTS-FM, a radio station (93.3 FM) licensed to El Cajon, California, United States
- the ICAO code for Tri-State Airport
