= KAVL =

- Lancaster, California; United States
- Broadcast area: Lancaster—Palmdale, California
- Frequency: 610 kHz
- Branding: Fox Sports 610

Programming
- Format: Sports
- Affiliations: Fox Sports Radio; Premiere Networks; Los Angeles Dodgers Radio Network; Westwood One

Ownership
- Owner: Rubin Broadcasting, Inc.
- Sister stations: KTPI; KTPI-FM

History
- First air date: October 13, 1950
- Last air date: June 2025
- Former frequencies: 1340 kHz (1950–1957)
- Call sign meaning: Antelope Valley Lancaster

Technical information
- Licensing authority: FCC
- Facility ID: 2318
- Class: B
- Power: 4,900 watts (day); 4,000 watts (night)
- Transmitter coordinates: 34°42′21.9″N 118°10′39.3″W
- Translator: 106.7 K294DA (Rosamond)

Links
- Public license information: Public file; LMS
- Webcast: Listen live
- Website: 610foxsports.com

KAVL (610 AM, "Fox Sports 610”) was a commercial radio station licensed to Lancaster, California, United States, and serving the Antelope Valley. Owned by Rubin Broadcasting, Inc. it carried a sports format as a Fox Sports Radio affiliate. KAVL had a directional-east 4,900 watt signal during the day and a directional-south 4,000 watt signal at night.

== History ==
KAVL first signed on September 8, 1950, on 1340 kHz. It moved to 610 kHz in 1957. For many years, KAVL broadcast a sports radio format with the branding "Sports Radio 610".

In September 1998, Antelope Broadcasting sold KAVL, KAVS and KYHT to Jacor Communications for $4 million. Jacor would be purchased by Clear Channel Communications the following year. KAVL then began simulcasting KXTA (XTRA Sports 1150) in Los Angeles. For a brief period, KAVL itself was simulcast on KBET (1220 AM) in Santa Clarita.

In 2007, publicly traded Clear Channel announced it was becoming a privately held corporation. As a condition of its approval of the plan, the Federal Communications Commission (FCC) required the company to divest 194 stations in markets where it exceeded ownership limits by placing them into a trust until they are sold. In January 2008, Clear Channel transferred KAVL and country music station KTPI-FM to the Aloha Station Trust. In December 2011, RZ Media LLC, owned by Saul Rosenzweig, purchased KAVL and KTPI-FM from the trust, and KTPI from Clear Channel directly, for a total of $800,000.

KAVL went silent in June 2025 following a transformer fire. The Federal Communications Commission cancelled the station's license on September 28, 2026.

== Programming ==
Since the Jacor/Clear Channel merger, KAVL's lineup had consisted almost entirely of Fox Sports Radio programming. The station also featured radio broadcasts of the Los Angeles Dodgers, the Los Angeles Lakers, and the National Football League (through Westwood One). KAVL was the longest-running Dodgers affiliate in Southern California, having broadcast the Dodgers since 1958.
