= KVGH =

KVGH may refer to:

- KGAY (AM), a radio station (1270 AM) licensed to serve Thousand Palms, California, United States, which held the call sign KVGH from 2016 to 2018
- KLXB, a radio station (105.1 FM) licensed to serve Bermuda Dunes, California, which held the call sign KVGH or KVGH-FM from 2015 to 2017
