= KIIS (Thousand Oaks, California) =

- Thousand Oaks, California; United States
- Broadcast area: Ventura County
- Frequency: 850 kHz

Ownership
- Owner: Salem Communications; (New Inspiration Broadcasting Company)

History
- First air date: September 20, 1971
- Last air date: February 17, 2004
- Former call signs: KKID (1970); KGOE (1970–1984); KMDY (1984–1992); KCTQ (1992–1995); KAHS (1995–1998); KLYF (1998–1999); KBET (1999–2000); KACD (2000–2001); KSSC (2001); KACD (2001–2003)
- Call sign meaning: Simulcast of KIIS-FM

Technical information
- Facility ID: 7749
- Class: B
- Power: 500 watts (daytime); 250 watts (nighttime)
- Transmitter coordinates: 34°12′7″N 118°49′50.3″W

KIIS (850 AM) was a commercial radio station licensed to Thousand Oaks, California, United States. It operated from 1971 to 2004. At the time of its sign-off, KIIS was owned by Salem Media Group and broadcast a top 40 music format as a simulcast of KIIS-FM in Los Angeles.

This was the third AM station to hold the KIIS call sign, following the stations at 1150 AM in Los Angeles (1975–1980 and 1984–1997, now KEIB) and 1220 AM in Santa Clarita (1999–2003, now KHTS). Each outlet simulcast KIIS-FM during its stint as KIIS.

== History ==
The station first signed on September 20, 1971, as KGOE. Originally owned by Conejo Broadcasters Inc., the 500-watt daytimer broadcast a middle of the road music format. In addition, it carried University of Oklahoma football games as a distant affiliate of the Sooner Radio Network. In December 1973, Conejo Broadcasters sold KGOE to General Broadcasting Co. for $85,466; nighttime operation began the following May. In June 1978, the station was sold to Affiliated Broadcasters for $155,000.

In 1984, Affiliated sold KGOE to Comedy Broadcasting Company, owned by Ira Barmak, for $750,000. The new owner changed the station's call sign to KMDY and adopted a format consisting of comedy and comedic albums. In 1992, KMDY adopted the KCTQ call letters, later becoming KAHS as an affiliate of the Radio AAHS children's radio network, simulcasting KPLS in Orange.

In April 1997, Buena Ventura Communications sold KAHS to Jacor Communications for $400,000. (Jacor in turn would be acquired by Clear Channel Communications two years later.) When Radio AAHS went off the air in 1998, the station briefly switched to adult standards. Several months later, KAHS changed its call sign to KLYF and began simulcasting the all-sports format of KXTA (Xtra Sports 1150) in Los Angeles.

Under Clear Channel ownership, the station underwent several format changes. KLYF became general talk station KBET in 1999. The following year, the station changed call letters to KACD and picked up the adult album alternative format abandoned by KACD-FM 103.1. In 2003, KACD adopted the KIIS calls and started simulcasting top 40 station KIIS-FM. For a brief period, KIIS simulcast classic country station KTDD in San Bernardino. The Thousand Oaks station returned to simulcasting KIIS-FM in 2004.

KIIS signed off February 17, 2004, after the lease on the land of the transmission towers' location expired and could not be renewed. The towers were then demolished and a housing tract was built on the former tower location. New Inspiration Broadcasting Company, a subsidiary of Salem Communications, bought the license on November 2, 2004, with the intent to surrender it to allow KRLA (870 AM) to increase its power; the KIIS license was canceled on March 4, 2005. As there is no present Federal Communications Commission process available to apply for a new AM station, the frequency cannot be reactivated.
