= KBIG =

Hot adult contemporary radio station in Los Angeles

- Los Angeles, California; United States
- Broadcast area: Greater Los Angeles
- Frequency: 104.3 MHz (HD Radio)
- Branding: 104.3 MYfm

Programming
- Language: English
- Format: Hot adult contemporary
- Subchannels: HD2: KLAC simulcast (Sports radio) "AM 570 LA Sports"
- Affiliations: Premiere Networks

Ownership
- Owner: iHeartMedia, Inc.; (iHM Licenses, LLC)
- Sister stations: KEIB; KFI; KIIS-FM; KLAC; KOST; KRRL; KSRY; KVVS; KYSR

History
- First air date: February 15, 1959
- Former call signs: KSRT (CP, 1950); KPLA (CP, 1950-1954); KBIQ (1954–1963); KBIG (1963–1965); KBIG-FM (1965–1971); KXTZ (1971–1974); KBIG-FM (1974–2013)
- Call sign meaning: Carl "Mr. Big" Bailey

Technical information
- Licensing authority: FCC
- Facility ID: 6360
- Class: B
- ERP: 65,000 watts
- HAAT: 928 meters (3,045 ft)
- Transmitter coordinates: 34.227°N 118.067°W

Links
- Public license information: Public file; LMS
- Webcast: Listen live (via iHeartRadio)
- Website: 1043myfm.iheart.com

KBIG (104.3 FM, "104.3 MYfm") is a commercial radio station licensed to Los Angeles, California, and serving the Greater Los Angeles area. The station is owned by iHeartMedia and broadcasts a hot adult contemporary radio format focusing on music from the 1990s to the present. Weekdays begin with the nationally syndicated Valentine in the Morning wake-up show, based at KBIG and hosted by Sean Valentine. Evenings feature On with Mario hosted by Mario Lopez.

KBIG's studios are on West Olive Avenue in Burbank. The station's primary transmitter is atop Mount Wilson. KBIG broadcasts using HD Radio technology. Its HD2 subchannel carries a simulcast of sister station KLAC.

== History ==
=== Beautiful music ===
The original KBIG 740 AM was founded by John H. Poole in 1952, originating from Catalina Island off the coast of California. Known as "The Catalina Island Station", Poole knew KBIG would have wide coverage of Southern California by broadcasting the station's directional signal across ocean water. KBIG was heard from Santa Barbara to San Diego, including the large audience in Los Angeles. The station became popular as it presented an island theme and scheduled music, news, and commercials on a different sequence from his competitors. "We knew if you changed stations during a commercial, you would always find music on K-BIG," Poole claimed. The KBIG call letters were selected in honor of the station's original disc jockey, Carl "Mr. Big" Bailey. The AM station was sold to religious broadcasters in 1980 and now operates as KBRT.

KBIG decided to add an FM station. KBIQ signed on the air on February 15, 1959. At first KBIG and KBIQ would simulcast their programming. At the time of its launch, the stations aired a beautiful music format, playing lush instrumental versions of Hollywood, Broadway, and pop songs with an occasional vocal. KBIG-FM also had its staff of "KBIG Singers", who would perform the station's jingles and record station albums to offer to listeners.

In 1968, KBIG-AM-FM was bought by Bonneville International for $2 million. Bonneville, owned by the Church of Jesus Christ of Latter Day Saints, specialized in beautiful music stations.

=== Switch to adult contemporary ===
Over time, the beautiful music format began to age. In 1987, the station dropped instrumentals and became a soft adult contemporary station, placing it in direct competition with KOST (103.5 FM), which had made a similar transition a few years earlier. Both stations enjoyed high ratings and were heard in many Los Angeles offices and workplaces.

By 1990, KBIG-FM dropped the 1960s songs and began playing more current hits. In 1992, KBIG-FM shifted to hot adult contemporary (hot AC). This lasted until 1995, when the station moved back to mainstream AC to again compete with KOST. In the 1990s, KBIG-FM aired Disco Saturday Night, a weekly show featuring disco music. In late 1996, KBIG-FM once again moved to a hot AC format.

=== Controversy ===
On February 8, 1994, KBIG-FM was sued by singer Barry Manilow, who sought $13 million in damages and $15 million in punitive damages. Manilow claimed that one of KBIG's advertisements was causing irreparable damage to his professional reputation. The ad, a 30-second spot which began airing on January 31, suggested that people listen to KBIG because it did not play Manilow's music. The lawsuit was filed in Orange County Superior Court by Los Angeles attorney C. Tucker Cheadle. Two days later, KBIG agreed to drop the commercial poking fun at the singer, but a lawyer representing his business interests stopped short of agreeing to withdraw the $28 million lawsuit.

In 1997, KBIG-FM owner Bonneville International conducted a nationwide six-station swap with Chancellor Communications valued at $740 million; in exchange for KBIG-FM, Bonneville obtained Los Angeles country music-formatted KZLA (93.9 FM). In 1998, Chancellor relaunched its new station as "The New K-BIG 104". It replaced most of its airstaff, and switched back to a mainstream AC format. During this time, KBIG-FM briefly became the Los Angeles area affiliate to the nationally syndicated love-song and dedication show Delilah.

=== Upbeat evolution ===
In 1999, Chancellor acquired KOST and KFI from Cox Radio. The same year, Chancellor and Capstar merged, forming AMFM, Inc. With AMFM now owning KOST, management moved KBIG to a hot AC format with a lean on 1980s hits, uptempo AC currents, and rhythmic pop. In 2000, AMFM was purchased by Clear Channel Communications (now iHeartMedia).

David "Chachi" Denes, age 28, became KBIG-FM's program director in 2003. On July 18, 2005, KBIG-FM made sweeping changes to its presentation by reducing commercial time and airing 30-minute music blocks. The station dropped jingles and the long-time top of the hour station identification (i.e., "... It's four o'clock in the West ..." would no longer be heard), and tweaked the playlist. It dropped current hits in favor of recurrents from the 1980s and 1990s, with most of the music leaning towards a rhythmic approach.

DJs also began to read out the individual letters of the station's ID, "K-B-I-G", instead of "K-Big" (although briefly in mid-2007, the "K-Big 104" slogan would sometimes be used). In addition to the station's Boogie Nights program weeknights, in July 2006, KBIG added the dance mix show Thump Radio on weekend late nights. Despite speculation that the station would shift to a dance format, management insisted that there were no changes in the works at the time.

On August 17, 2006, KBIG-FM picked up new competition when Emmis Communications changed longtime country station KZLA to rhythmic adult contemporary as "Movin' 93.9 KMVN". The move gave Los Angeles two stations with a rhythmic-sounding direction aimed at adults, even though KBIG-FM technically aired a hot AC format. In 2007, Emmis launched a $5 million marketing campaign which had little effect on KBIG-FM; that company's chief financial officer Pat Walsh said it was the "single largest marketing program in Emmis history". Emmis CEO Jeff Smulyan seemed unsure of KMVN, saying rhythmic AC Movin' "may or may not be right". But after a shaky start in its first two Arbitron ratings books, KMVN did move up in the Spring 2007 period, while KBIG-FM saw a dip.

=== Casey Kasem and Delilah ===
Despite having been a rhythmic-based radio station, KBIG-FM was a loyal affiliate of Casey Kasem's weekly countdown show for hot AC stations, American Top 20, which aired Sunday mornings. Former KBIG morning drive personality Charlie Tuna was Kasem's regular substitute host. KBIG had been the flagship station for Casey's adult contemporary countdown since it launched in 1992 until the station flipped back to hot AC in 2007.

In February 2007, KBIG-FM added Delilah back to its lineup. The news of having the program air on the station generated much talk because her show is geared toward a mainstream AC audience and seemed out of place on the rhythmic-oriented station. However, after adding Delilah, KBIG-FM began adding more mainstream AC content to its playlist.

=== "104.3 MYfm" ===
During the first week of September 2007, there was talk about KBIG-FM flipping formats as several domain names had been registered that hinted at such a change. On September 17, Charlie Tuna confirmed a change was coming when he announced on his website that he was leaving as morning host after seven years on KBIG. Tuna said he'd continue to work within Clear Channel's Los Angeles cluster. On September 17, 2007, at 10 am, immediately after Tuna's show ended, the station dropped rhythmic adult contemporary and began identifying itself as "104.3 MYfm", adopting the adult top 40 format that was airing on sister station KYSR (98.7 FM). (KYSR would switch to alternative rock a few days later on September 20.)

The first two songs on "MYfm" were "Hey There Delilah" by the Plain White T's and "Livin' On A Prayer" by Bon Jovi. (KBIG-FM's former rhythmic AC format moved to the station's HD2 subchannel and sister station KHHT (now urban contemporary-formatted KRRL); the HD2 would later air an LGBTQ-centric dance music format branded as "Pride Radio" until it was replaced with a simulcast of KLAC in 2026.)

Denes described KBIG-FM's new approach as "Contemporary Adult Hits". In an interview with R&R magazine, Clear Channel Los Angeles vice president of programming Michael Martin said, "With today's consumer wanting to custom tailor everything to their liking, the name MY is a perfect brand for radio. This is a station designed by the listeners to play music they tell us they want to hear. How do we know what they want to hear? Extensive, market research and continual-weekly music information to keep the station familiar, fun and family friendly." Martin continued, "MY is designed to sit right in the middle of STAR 98.7 KYSR (which has evolved to Alternative) and Mainstream AC rival KOST 103.5, playing a great mix of music styles and eras. The MY playlist is deep, filled with contemporary music from all genres. It's a mix that is not currently heard in L.A. radio." Denes added, "104.3 MYfm will play adult hits like Kelly Clarkson, Beyoncé, Christina Aguilera, Fergie, Justin Timberlake, John Mayer, Shakira, Madonna, Santana and much more. Every song we play is or was at the top of the charts."

With the move, Delilah was once again dropped, leaving Los Angeles without a Delilah affiliate. She returned to the market in 2012, when her show was picked up by KFSH-FM where it aired until 2020. In 2025, sister station KOST would pick up Delilah following the end of its local Love Songs program.

=== Valentine in the Morning ===
In 2007, Sean Valentine became the new morning host. He had been at sister station KIIS-FM. A week after the launch of "MYfm" on September 24, Valentine in the Morning began.

His co-hosts are Jill Escoto and Jon Comouche. The show is also heard on iHeartMedia stations in Fort Myers, Bakersfield, Fresno and other cities. He also worked the afternoon drive shift temporarily in 2009.

KBIG-FM re-introduced American Top 20 with Casey Kasem on February 24, 2008. The show aired in the same Sunday morning time slot as prior to the "MY" flip, until Casey retired from the program on July 5, 2009. Disco Saturday Night was carried by KBIG-FM for nearly a year after the format change, but after Labor Day in 2008, the show was replaced by 8 Hours Of 80s, which ran until the spring of 2009.

In April 2009, Sean Hamilton, long-time afternoon host at WKTU-FM in New York City, joined KBIG-FM as host of its afternoon show. Hamilton remained in New York and voicetracked his show for My FM. Later, Dave Styles took over Hamilton's slot.

Dawson McAllister Live was added on Sunday evenings in July 2009. KBIG-FM is one of the few hot AC stations to carry the show as it is usually found on Top 40/CHR stations and geared toward a teenage and young adult audience.

On March 18, 2013, the station dropped the -FM suffix from its call sign, becoming simply "KBIG".

== HD Radio ==
On January 23, 2006, KBIG launched HD Radio subchannel KBIG-HD2, branded as "Studio 104", and focused on disco hits. The station was programmed by Blake Florence.

On June 4, 2008, at noon, KBIG-HD2 dropped the all-disco format to introduce an LGBTQ-oriented HD radio station called Pride Radio from iHeartMedia. It plays dance and rhythmic hits.
