= Big Boy (radio host) =

American radio host and actor

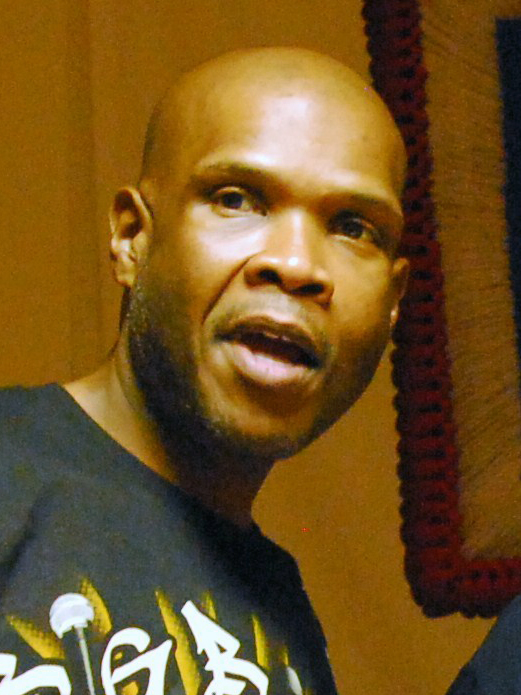
- Big Boy in 2010
- Born: Kurt Alexander; September 8, 1969 (age 56); Chicago, Illinois, U.S.
- Other name: MC Scratch
- Occupations: Radio host; actor; former bodyguard
- Years active: 1997–present
- Spouse: Veronica Alexander
- Website: radiobigboy.com real923la.com BigBoyOnDemand.com

Kurt Alexander (born September 8, 1969), known professionally as Big Boy, is an American radio host and actor. From 1997, he has hosted the morning show at Los Angeles rhythmic contemporary station KPWR (Power 106) until his move to KRRL (Real 92.3) in February 2015. His stage name derives from his formerly large build, which he modified through duodenal switch surgery in 2003, leading to a nearly fatal weight loss of over 250 pounds. Big Boy is culturally recognized as a prominent figure in urban radio.

== Life and career ==
Big Boy's image became well known throughout the Greater Los Angeles area in the late 1990s. However, his first big break onto the national spotlight was when he was hired as the announcer on the Vibe TV talk show, named after the popular magazine, in 1998 which was hosted by comedian Sinbad. When the program ended, Big Boy apparently had media fans at the executive level because he was offered a host position in the early 2000s with Power 106 and was promoted by placing his 500-plus pound image onto billboards throughout the area.

Big Boy has been named Personality of the Year four times by the Radio Music Awards and three times by Radio and Records magazine. The National Association of Broadcasters awarded him the Marconi Award in 2002 and 2004. In September 2015, he was voted as an inductee to the 2015 National Radio Hall of Fame.

On July 27, 2010, his sidekick Tattoo left the show.

On February 3, 2015, Emmis Communications filed a breach of contract suit against Big Boy after he accepted a $3.5 million contract with iHeartMedia and quit the KPWR morning show. iHeart owns crosstown urban contemporary station Real 92.3 KRRL. At KPWR, nighttime host J. Cruz was the morning show host until he left the station in 2019 prior to his move to KRRL as its afternoon host with Nick Cannon taking his place as the new host in early June.

In March 2016, a year after he joined KRRL and iHeartMedia, his nationally syndicated program was transferred to iHeart's syndication division Premiere Networks from Westwood One. Beginning July 30, 2018, the show is also carried in a two-hour edited video form on the American cable network FM (Fuse Music).
