= Jamie, Frosty and Frank Show =

- Comedy album of the show released in 1999 by Star
- Genre: Talk, humor
- Country of origin: United States
- Language: English
- Original release: 1994

The Jamie, Frosty, and Frank Show was an American radio show which ran from 1994 to 1999 on Denver's Alice 105.9 and from 1998 to 1999 on Los Angeles's Star 98.7.
