= KLXB =

- Bermuda Dunes, California; United States
- Broadcast area: Palm Springs, California
- Frequency: 105.1 MHz (HD Radio)

Programming
- Format: Contemporary Christian
- Subchannels: HD2: KHCS simulcast; HD3: Radio Nueva Vida; HD4: CSN International
- Network: K-Love

Ownership
- Owner: Educational Media Foundation
- Sister stations: KHCS

History
- First air date: December 1996
- Former call signs: KNKG (1992); KYHT (1992–2002); KJAT (2002–2003); KRSX-FM (2003–2014); KQCM (2014–2015); KVGH (2015–2016); KVGH-FM (2016–2017)
- Former frequencies: 105.3 MHz (1992–2014)

Technical information
- Licensing authority: FCC
- Facility ID: 2316
- Class: A
- ERP: 2,050 watts
- HAAT: 175 meters (574 ft)
- Transmitter coordinates: 33°51′55.3″N 116°26′12.8″W
- Translators: HD3: 91.3 K217EZ (Coachella); HD3: 96.3 K242BR (Indio); HD4: 97.3 K247CL (Indio); HD4: 105.7 K289CW (Palm Springs)

Links
- Public license information: Public file; LMS
- Website: www.klove.com

KLXB (105.1 FM), is a non-commercial radio station licensed to Bermuda Dunes, California, and serving the Palm Springs radio market. The station is owned by Educational Media Foundation and airs that company's contemporary Christian radio format known as "K-Love". KLXB is also heard on a translator station, K247CL (97.3 MHz) in Indio, California.

== History ==
=== Early years/Clear Channel era (1996–2007) ===
The station first signed on in December 1996 as KYHT, originally broadcasting on 105.3 MHz and licensed to Yermo, California. Owned by Antelope Broadcasting, it simulcast KAVS in Mojave and its top 40 music format, branded as "Hot 97". When KAVS dropped top 40 in favor of a modern rock format, KYHT and KAVS rebranded as "High Desert Modern Rock 97.7 & 105.3".

In September 1998, Antelope sold its three stations – KYHT, KAVS, and KAVL — to Jacor Communications for $4 million. Jacor would be purchased by Clear Channel Communications the following year. KAVS and KYHT dropped their modern rock programming and began simulcasting the top 40 format of sister station KIIS-FM (102.7 FM) in Los Angeles part-time as "97.7 & 105.3 KIIS-FM". In the early days of Jacor/Clear Channel ownership, KYHT/KAVS featured local programming hosted by Chester The Arrester and held many on-air events in the Antelope Valley and Barstow areas. In early 1999, KYHT went off the air due to a windstorm that caused the transmitter building to buckle and become airborne; the station returned to the air after three days.

The grouping of KIIS-FM (102.7 FM) in Los Angeles, KIIS (1220 AM) in Santa Clarita, KAVS (97.7 FM) in the Antelope Valley, KYHT (105.3 FM) in Barstow/Victor Valley, and KFMS (101.9 FM) in Las Vegas created nearly continuous coverage of KIIS-FM between Los Angeles and Las Vegas. However, KFMS in Las Vegas was branded as "KISS" instead of "KIIS".

Following the Jacor/Clear Channel merger of 1999, KYHT moved its operations to 300 E. Grace Street in Barstow. The station began identifying as "105.3 KIIS-FM" and dropped KAVS's local programming, instead airing a local modern rock-intensive top 40 music format on weekends.

In 2001, KYHT became a part of Clear Channel's Victor Valley cluster and began simulcasting KZXY-FM (102.3 FM), airing a hot adult contemporary music format full-time as "Y 102 & 105". This flip prompted KWID in Las Vegas to drop its simulcast of KIIS-FM and switch to all-local programming. The building where 105.3 KIIS-FM's local studio in Barstow resided became a factory for Hydropedes Glycerin-filled insoles, and later a church.

In 2002, KYHT changed its call letters to KJAT and began simulcasting KATJ-FM (100.7), broadcasting a country music format branded as "Cat Country 100.7 & 105.3". In 2004, KJAT adopted the KRSX-FM call sign, airing an oldies music format syndicated by Jones Radio Network with the branding "Cruisin' Oldies 105.3".

=== El Dorado/S and H era (2007–2016) ===
In July 2007, KRSX-FM was one of 16 stations in California and Arizona which Clear Channel sold to El Dorado Broadcasters for $40 million.

On December 7, 2009, El Dorado took KRSX-FM silent in anticipation of a relocation to Twentynine Palms, California, citing a lack of listenership and revenue in the Barstow area. In June 2010, the company sold the station to S & H Broadcasting for $100,000. KRSX-FM returned to the air November 14, 2011, broadcasting to the Twentynine Palms area with a hybrid talk/sports format as "Talk 105.3".

On January 1, 2014, KRSX-FM adopted the KQCM call letters and contemporary hit radio format of a station on 95.5 FM in Twentynine Palms (now KCLZ). With the move, the station rebranded as "KQ 105.3".

KQCM went silent once again on July 1, 2014. On June 5, 2015, KQCM changed its community of license to North Shore, California to serve the Palm Springs market. Its frequency also changed from 105.3 FM to 105.1 FM. Two weeks later, on June 19, KQCM changed its call sign to KVGH. After briefly stunting with Christmas music, on July 1, the station finally returned to the air with a classic hits format and the branding "Valley 105.1". The call letters changed again to KVGH-FM on February 23, 2016.

=== Educational Media Foundation era (2016–present) ===
On November 3, 2016, S & H Broadcasting sold KVGH-FM to Educational Media Foundation (EMF) for $1.125 million. EMF intended to flip the station to K-Love, its nationally syndicated Christian adult contemporary radio network, as a simulcast of KLVR in Middletown, California. The classic hits format remained on the station in the meantime and was simulcast on KVGH (AM) (1270 AM), for which S & H held a construction permit for new translator K293CL (106.5 FM) in Thousand Palms. On December 15, KVGH-FM's city of license changed to Bermuda Dunes, California.

The sale closed on January 31, 2017, at which point it changed call letters to KLXB, dropped its classic hits format, and began stunting. This lasted until February 27, when KLXB began broadcasting contemporary Christian music as K-Love.

== HD Radio ==
KLXB broadcasts in HD Radio with four digital subchannels:

- KLXB-HD1 simulcasts the analog signal of K-Love.
- KLXB-HD2 airs Air1, EMF's contemporary worship network.
- KLXB-HD3 airs Radio Nueva Vida.
- KLXB-HD4 airs CSN International.
