= Los Angeles Dodgers Radio Network =

American baseball radio network

The Los Angeles Dodgers Radio Network is a network that consists of 27 radio stations that air Major League Baseball games of the Los Angeles Dodgers in parts of seven states and one U.S. territory and in three languages. As of June 2012, 20 stations broadcast games in English, while another six broadcast them in Spanish. In 2013, Korean broadcasts were added, making it the only tri-lingual network in Major League Baseball.

== English ==
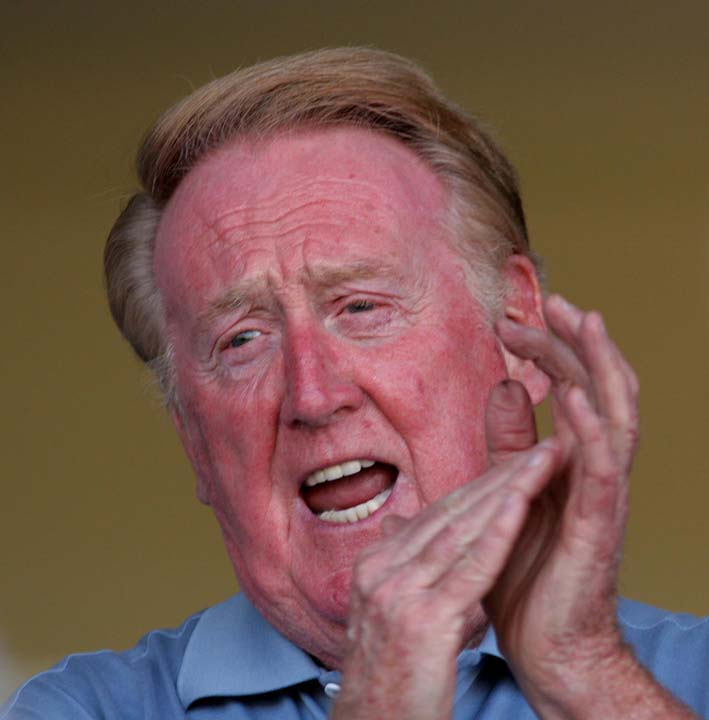
Longtime Dodgers broadcaster Vin Scully

The primary English-language radio broadcasts are handled by Charley Steiner, Stephen Nelson, and Tim Neverett on play-by-play and Rick Monday on color commentary. Until his 2016 retirement, Vin Scully's television play-by-play for SportsNet LA (previously Prime Ticket) was simulcast during the first three innings of games that he called (primarily home games, and away games in California and Arizona). Steiner and Monday called the entire game on radio during games that were nationally televised. For locally televised road games that Scully did not call, Steiner handled the TV commentary with Orel Hershiser and Nomar Garciaparra on color commentary, while Monday called play-by-play on radio with Kevin Kennedy doing color. During the post-season, Scully called the first and last three innings solo, with Steiner and Monday calling the middle innings.

Scully retired on October 2, 2016; his commentary was simulcast on radio for the entire game. Scully died on August 2, 2022.

Los Angeles Dodgers radio network affiliates
City/market	State	Station	Frequency	Network status
Bakersfield	California	KHTY	970 AM	Affiliate
Bishop	California	KBOV	1230 AM	Affiliate
Fresno	California	KCBL	1340 AM	Affiliate
Fresno	California	KLLE	107.9 FM	Affiliate
Lancaster	California	KAVL	610 AM	Affiliate
Lancaster	California	K294DA	106.7 FM	KAVL relay
Los Angeles	California	KLAC	570 AM	Flagship
Palm Springs	California	KKUU-HD2	103.9-2 FM	Affiliate
Riverside	California	KPWK	1350 AM	Affiliate
San Luis Obispo–Santa Maria	California	KXTK	1280 AM	Affiliate
San Luis Obispo–Santa Maria	California	K269GY	101.7 FM	KXTK relay
Santa Clarita	California	KHTS	1220 AM	Affiliate
Santa Clarita	California	K251CF	98.1 FM	KHTS relay
Ventura–Oxnard	California	KVYB	106.3 FM	Affiliate
Honolulu	Hawaii	KIKI	990 AM	Affiliate
Las Vegas	Nevada	KXQQ-HD2	100.5-2 FM	Affiliate
Las Vegas	Nevada	K268CS	101.5 FM	KXQQ-HD2 relay
Albuquerque	New Mexico	KQTM	101.7 FM	Affiliate
Gallup	New Mexico	KYVA	1230 AM	Affiliate
Gallup	New Mexico	K252FM	98.3 FM	KYVA relay
Saint Thomas	U.S. Virgin Islands	WSTA	1340 AM	Affiliate (part-time)

== Spanish ==
A separate network airs games in Spanish. Jaime Jarrín has been the Spanish play-by-play voice of the Dodgers since 1959 until his retirement in 2022. His oldest son, Jorge Jarrín, is also the play-by-play announcer replacing Pepe Yniguez and Fernando Valenzuela who are now on Spectrum SportsNet LA's Spanish-language channel. Jose Mota joined the Dodgers Spanish-language radio broadcasts in 2022 for road games and from 2023 for most games. Starting with the 2025 season, former infielder Luis Cruz, joins the Dodgers as the team's new Spanish-language color commentator, succeeding Fernando Valenzuela, who died on October 22, 2024 before the Dodgers World Series opener.

City/market	State	Station	Frequency	Network status
Fresno	California	KLLE	107.9 FM	Affiliate
Los Angeles	California	KTNQ	1020 AM	Flagship
Oxnard–Ventura	California	KOXR	910 AM	Affiliate
Oxnard–Ventura	California	K271CY	102.1 FM	KOXR relay
Riverside–San Bernardino	California	KCAL	1410 AM	Affiliate
Santa Maria	California	KSBQ	1480 AM	Affiliate
Santa Maria	California	K275CJ	102.9 FM	KSBQ relay
Las Vegas	Nevada	KISF-HD2	103.5-2 FM	Affiliate

== Korean ==
In 2013, the Dodgers announced that 60 games would be aired in Korean on KMPC AM 1540. Richard Choi does play-by-play while Chong Ho Yim does color commentary. As of 2014, selected Dodger games are broadcast on AM 1540, while all games are broadcast in Korean on the Second Audio Program of Spectrum SportsNet LA.

== See also ==
- List of XM Satellite Radio channels
- List of Sirius Satellite Radio stations
