= KPTI (disambiguation) =

KPTI is the kernel page-table isolation hardening feature in the Linux kernel to mitigate the Meltdown security vulnerability in Intel and other CPUs.

KPTI may also refer to:

- KPTI (FM), the 2004–2009 callsign of the radio station KXXF, licensed to the city of Winnie, Texas, US
- KREV (FM), a radio station with the callsign KPTI (2002–2004), serving the greater San Francisco Bay Area, California, US
- Karyopharm Therapeutics (NASDAQ: KPTI), in the NASDAQ Biotechnology Index

== See also ==
- KTPI (disambiguation)
