= KHCS =

Air 1 radio station in Palm Desert, California

- Palm Desert, California; United States
- Broadcast area: Palm Springs, California
- Frequency: 91.7 MHz
- Branding: Air1

Programming
- Format: Contemporary worship music
- Network: Air1

Ownership
- Owner: Educational Media Foundation
- Sister stations: KLXB

History
- First air date: January 1993
- Former call signs: KYRH (1990, CP)

Technical information
- Licensing authority: FCC
- Facility ID: 77680
- Class: A
- ERP: 960 watts
- HAAT: 151.4 meters (497 ft)
- Transmitter coordinates: 33°52′0.1″N 116°26′3″W

Links
- Public license information: Public file; LMS
- Website: air1.com

KHCS (91.7 FM) is a non-commercial educational radio station broadcasting a contemporary worship music format. Licensed to Palm Desert, California, United States, the station serves the Palm Springs area and can be heard from Banning to North Shore, over most of the Coachella Valley. KHCS airs the nationally syndicated Air1 worship music network around the clock.

Prior to the station's sale to Educational Media Foundation in April 2018, KHCS was a contemporary inspirational-formatted station known as "Joy92". It was owned by Prairie Avenue Gospel Center and carried a variety of locally produced Christian programming as well as inspirational music.

== History ==
The station initially was assigned the call letters KYRH on February 7, 1990, by the U.S. Federal Communications Commission; on April 1, the station changed its call sign to KHCS. However, the station would not make its on-air debut until January 1993, three years later.

From its inception, KHCS was owned by Prairie Avenue Gospel Center, a church based in Long Beach, California, and carried a contemporary inspirational format. Branded "Joy92" and positioning itself as "the Desert's Christian Radio", the station aired a variety of music, talk and teaching programming, much of it produced locally in Southern California.

On April 5, 2018, KHCS entered into an affiliation agreement with Educational Media Foundation to carry the latter's Christian contemporary hit radio network Air1; the Joy92 programming was dropped. On April 20, EMF purchased KHCS from Prairie Avenue Gospel Center for $450,000; the purchase was consummated on June 27, 2018.
