= KRRL =

Urban contemporary radio station in Los Angeles

- Los Angeles; United States
- Broadcast area: Greater Los Angeles; Southern California
- Frequency: 92.3 MHz (HD Radio)
- Branding: Real 92.3

Programming
- Language: English
- Format: Urban contemporary
- Subchannels: HD2: Black Information Network
- Affiliations: iHeartRadio; Premiere Networks; United Stations Radio Networks

Ownership
- Owner: iHeartMedia; (iHM Licenses, LLC)
- Sister stations: KBIG; KEIB; KFI; KIIS-FM; KLAC; KOST; KSRY; KVVS; KYSR

History
- First air date: December 29, 1948
- Former call signs: KFAC-FM (1948–1989); KKBT (1989–2000); KCMG (2000–2001); KHHT (2001–2015)
- Former frequencies: 104.3 MHz (1948–1954)
- Call sign meaning: "Real"

Technical information
- Licensing authority: FCC
- Facility ID: 35022
- Class: B
- ERP: 42,000 watts
- HAAT: 887 meters (2,910 ft)
- Transmitter coordinates: 34°13′36″N 118°3′57″W

Links
- Public license information: Public file; LMS
- Webcast: Listen live (via iHeartRadio)
- Website: real923la.iheart.com

KRRL (92.3 FM) – branded Real 92.3 – is a commercial urban contemporary radio station licensed to Los Angeles, serving much of the Greater Los Angeles area. Owned by iHeartMedia, KRRL serves as the flagship for Big Boy's Neighborhood. The KRRL studios are located in the Los Angeles suburb of Burbank, while the station transmitter resides on Mount Wilson. Besides a standard analog transmission, KRRL broadcasts over two HD Radio channels, and is available online via iHeartRadio.

== History ==
=== KFAC-FM ===
The station first signed on the air on December 29, 1948, as KFAC-FM, the FM adjunct to KFAC. First owned by Errett Lobban Cord, a luxury vehicle manufacturer who purchased KFAC in 1931 from the Bible Institute of Los Angeles, KFAC became one of the first commercially operated radio stations in the United States to adopt a full-time fine arts/classical music format, having gradually added long-form programming devoted to the genre between 1938 and 1945. The station's longest-running program, the six-night-a-week Gas Company Evening Concert, would enjoy a run on both KFAC—and later it and KFAC-FM—between October 1940 and September 1989. KFAC also slowly assembled an airstaff with unprecedented continuity and tenure, including, but not limited to: Thomas Cassidy, Fred Crane, Tom Dixon, Dick Crawford, Bill Carlson and Carl Princi, all six of which would be continuously employed by the station between 1953 and 1983.

At the time KFAC-FM was established, it generally simulcast KFAC's programming, but began to deviate from this to participate in a series of pseudo-stereo concert broadcasts with KFAC from the Hollywood Bowl Amphitheatre, starting in 1953. KFAC was fed the audio from a microphone pointed at one end of the Bowl, and KFAC-FM the audio from a microphone at the other end of the Bowl. Originally based at the transmitter site for KFAC in Los Angeles' Crenshaw district and operated at 104.3 MHz, the station moved to 92.3 MHz and the transmitter was moved to the top of Mount Wilson, both in July 1954, and was officially dedicated during a pseudo-stereo concert broadcast from the Bowl. Because KFAC-FM made this move to Mount Wilson prior to the FCC enacting limits for power output by FM stations in 1962, it is formally classified as a "Superpower" FM by operating at a maximum power level, but with the antenna being placed well above the height limit. These pseudo-stereo broadcasts were offered over both stations for 12 hours each week over the next decade, ending after KFAC-FM converted to a multiplexed signal in 1964.

E.L. Cord sold KFAC and KFAC-FM to Cleveland Broadcasting Incorporated, founded by Ray T. Miller (a former mayor of Cleveland, Ohio) for a combined $2 million. Miller founded WERE and WERE-FM in Cleveland, and also owned WLEC and WLEC-FM in Sandusky, Ohio, and pledged to maintain KFAC's classical format. After Miller's 1966 death, the company was sold two years later to Atlantic States Industries, a McGarven-Guild Radio subsidiary, for a combined $9 million. A waiver was requested to keep both KFAC and KFAC-FM under common ownership due to an interim policy proposed by the FCC which would have prohibited it; after a public on-air solicitation of support from listeners yielded 15,000 letters, the waiver was granted, and the deal was approved in October 1969.

KFAC and KFAC-FM ended their full-time simulcast on January 17, 1972; while both kept the same format and same airstaffs, KFAC-FM utilized a deeper playlist and broader spectrum of selections, while KFAC focused on more familiar selections and melodies, aiming to attract younger listeners. Both stations still simulcast core programming like Evening Concert, Luncheon at the Lincoln Center, and Continental Classics. The KFAC Listeners' Guild was established in 1970 supported by an annual $3 membership fee, providing listeners a chance to provide direct feedback to the station and its operations, it boasted over 11,000 members after the first year.

An ownership transfer in 1986 attracted controversy after most of the tenured airstaff was dismissed on December 31, 1986. When KFAC was sold to Lotus Communications as the new home of KWKW (1300 AM) for $8.7 million on July 15, 1988, only five percent of KFAC and KFAC-FM's total audience listened to the AM frequency; the only deviation between both stations was the Brian Clewer-hosted Cynic's Choice that aired solely on KFAC. Days before that deal closed, on January 15, 1989, KFAC-FM was sold to Evergreen Media for $55 million, setting a record for the most expensive sale of a classical music outlet in the United States.

Despite Evergreen head Scott Ginsberg telling Radio & Records that KFAC-FM's format would remain in place, industry analysis warned a format change would occur because of the debt incurred in purchasing the station. Speculation began to accelerate when KFAC-FM dropped format in early July—for only a few minutes—to carry part of a Rolling Stones press conference, then Evergreen took responsibility for a cryptic billboard taken on Sunset Boulevard reading, "Pirate Radio, KLSX, KLOS: Get Ready to Move Over and Let the Big Dogs Eat!" Jim de Castro, who was appointed as KFAC's general manager from Evergreen's WLUP in Chicago, later admitted he won free use of that billboard for a month as the result of a golf bet. Finally, Evergreen announced the donation of KFAC and KFAC-FM's music library, with roots dating back to the early 1940s and appraised at $1.8 million, to KUSC; Stanford University and the Los Angeles Public Library acquired KFAC's compact disc library, the majority of titles KUSC already held. KUSC was also presented with a $35,000 check and the rights to the KFAC calls, those would later be placed on a KUSC repeater in Santa Barbara.

KFAC's demise attracted local and national attention, in part due to the longevity of the format and its presence in the nation's second largest radio market. A New York Times profile printed on the day of its format change labeled KFAC "a staple of Los Angeles's cultural life for 58 years" and that its switch was "a sign of the times and perhaps of things to come as American cultural tastes evolve." Competing radio stations KPFK and KCRW both aired tribute programming to KFAC, and Mount Wilson FM Broadcasters' KKGO-FM announced that it would switch formats to classical in January 1990, with KKGO-FM's existing jazz format moving to KKGO (540 AM). KFAC's John Santana was hired by KKGO as a host, and revived the Gas Company Evening Concert the following March, with former KFAC announcer Tom Dixon as host. Meanwhile, Evergreen tried to capitalize on the attention the week of KFAC's switch by running television ads locally on L.A. Law, the 1989 MTV Movie Awards, and The Arsenio Hall Show teasing the "new" format.

An outdoor event was staged outside of KFAC's studios (at the former Villa Capri restaurant on Hollywood's Yucca Street) at noon on September 20, 1989, to commemorate the end of the classical format; this was simulcast on KUSC, which—along with KFSD in San Diego—had placed advertising promoting themselves on KFAC. The hour began with Jim de Castro ceremoniously "passing a baton" to KUSC general manager Wallace Smith, then after a partially improvised farewell message from Rich Capparela, the hour concluded with KFAC-FM's final classical selection: Haydn's "Farewell" Symphony. After a moment of silence led by de Castro, the air signal switched to a heartbeat sound effect, while television monitors outside the studios started playing the television ad proclaiming the new format, accompanied by a skywriter scripting in the skies above "It's Alive. FM-92", but all reporters in attendance wound up focusing on KFAC instead.

=== KKBT ===
The on-air heartbeat sound stunting would continue for the next 23 hours, interspersed with brief snippets of rock songs, ahead of the debut of KKBT the next day (September 21, 1989). Branded "The New FM 92 The Beat", the station offered a blend of adult rock, dance music, and adult contemporary. The first song under the new format was "Walk on the Wild Side" by Lou Reed. However, the format failed in the ratings; in the Winter 1990 ratings report for the market, KKBT was ranked 8th 12+, 10th in the 25-54 year-old age demographic, and 15th in overall cume. After less than five months, on February 3, 1990, the station switched to rhythmic adult contemporary, while maintaining the "FM 92 The Beat" branding. With the change, KKBT entered into direct format competition with KDAY, KJLH, KACE, and KGFJ, although KKBT focused more on soul music/rhythm and blues selections. While the station attracted criticism for its aggressive on-air tactics, KKBT's ratings rose significantly after the switch; by the summer of that year, it evolved to a strictly urban AC format. By 1991, rap and hip-hop were being mixed in, and the station evolved to an urban contemporary format as "92.3 The Beat".

As an urban contemporary station, KKBT hit #1 a few times in the ratings, and competed aggressively with a hip-hop station on the 105.9 frequency, KPWR. During its tenure as "The Beat", the station featured many popular and legendary DJs who came from stations like KPWR, KMEL, WQHT, KIIS-FM, and KDAY, like John London and The House Party (a popular morning show which competed with other top local shows such as Mark and Brian on KLOS and Rick Dees on KIIS), Diana Steele, Theodore "Theo" Mizuhara, Eric Cubiche, Nautica De La Cruz, P.J. Butta, N.W.A's founder Eazy-E, Ronnie "Big Ron" O'Brien, Johnny "Big John" Monds, Kevin "Slow Jammin'" James, and Kevin Nash. Other shows included Westside Radio, a weekly radio program dedicated to West Coast Hip-Hop (now airing on KDAY), and Street Soldiers, a weekly program dedicated to community issues and politics. The station went by the slogan "No Color Lines" based on the words to Janet Jackson's iconic 1989 smash hit and anthem entitled "Rhythm Nation", that slogan does proudly championing the diversity of the region. But it is also believed that KKBT was inspired by KMEL, KPWR, and KDAY. During the 1990s, the station held a summer concert known as "FM 92 The Beat's Summer Jam", which featured major Hip-hop and R&B stars who performed at the Irvine Meadows Amphitheatre. In February 1996, sister station WYNY in New York City simulcasted KKBT for a day as part of a week-long stunt of simulcasting sister stations nationwide before changing formats to rhythmic adult contemporary as WKTU.

In a group deal in 1997, Evergreen merged with Chancellor. Chancellor acquired stations from other groups that exited the market. In 1999, Chancellor merged with Capstar and the company became AMFM, Incorporated.

=== KCMG ===
In the fall of 1999, Clear Channel Communications and AMFM, Inc. merged. This gave Clear Channel five FM stations in Los Angeles and KIIS, which Clear Channel already owned. However, in order to get under the government-mandated market ownership limits, some stations were required to be spun off; in Los Angeles, one of the full-powered FMs had to go. KKBT's was the station chosen; it was sold to Radio One. However, Clear Channel wanted to keep the best possible signal, and gave Radio One 100.3 FM. Leading up to the frequency swap, rumors swirled about whether 100.3's format would survive the move to 92.3 FM. Being that 100.3 was going to an African-American owned company known for urban formats, it seemed that "The Beat" would likely move to 100.3 intact. Much speculation led to 92.3 going active rock, possibly with the KMET calls. When the switch was made at 5 p.m. on June 30, 2000, the formats and call letters did come along for the ride, with 92.3 becoming KCMG, "Mega 92.3", and 100.3 becoming KKBT, "100.3 The Beat".

=== KHHT ===
The station, now called "Mega 92.3", continued playing rhythmic oldies. On August 9, 2001, KCMG changed its call letters to KHHT, re-branded as "Hot 92.3", and shifted to more of an urban AC format. However, KHHT was not a typical urban AC station; this station was one of the first urban AC's to play more old school/classic soul, the more mainstream-level R&B (barely-to-not playing neo-soul at all) and some rhythmic and Latino pop/R&B songs to cater to the Hispanic and Asian audiences that listen to R&B music in particular. In this way, KHHT's playlist structure was the inspiration for other urban AC markets in the western half of the U.S. such as sister stations KISQ in San Francisco, KSYU in Albuquerque, and KHYL in Sacramento.

KHHT was one of three urban ACs serving the Los Angeles market; the others were KRBV (formerly KKBT, which changed from R&B/hip-hop in May 2006, but was sold by Radio One to Bonneville International in April 2008), and KJLH, whose signal is not full-power and barely penetrates the San Fernando Valley. In July 2006, it was announced that Art Laboe, a legendary oldies DJ in Los Angeles, would expand his syndicated show from weekend to weekdays, with KHHT as the flagship station. Laboe's move was interpreted as an attempt to expand the station's Hispanic audience as it competed with KRBV and KJLH, both of which were African-American owned, operated and targeting stations (only KJLH remains Black-owned).

However, by 2008, it became apparent that the over-saturation of Adult R&B stations in Los Angeles had made it difficult for three outlets to compete for the same audience. As a result of this, KHHT began to shift directions from an urban AC direction to rhythmic hot AC, allowing it to focus more on the Hispanic and Asian audience, and opened up its playlist to include current rhythmic hits. This move also opened up a new battle in the Los Angeles radio war, which found KHHT taking on another rhythmic AC, KMVN, whose direction was more focused on recurrents from the 1970s and 1980s, which also explained KHHT's decision to add currents to its playlist. KHHT's sister station KBIG-FM once had a rhythmic AC direction before shifting back to Hot AC in September 2007. The April 2008 sale/format change of KRBV would have resulted in further tweakings at KHHT, but due to Arbitron's implementation of the Portable People Meter in the Los Angeles radio market and a move by its sister stations to adjust their formats to attract certain demos, KHHT decided to continue concentrating on attracting their Hispanic demos, where they feel more comfortable.

As of April 2009, KHHT once again became the only rhythmic adult contemporary in the market, as KMVN made a format change to Spanish. This move prompted KHHT to further adjust its musical direction by adding more Disco and Freestyle tracks to its current format as a way to attract the displaced KMVN listeners, and by June 2009, it showed an increase in the PPM ratings after it began to further tweak its selection more to slightly favor currents and less favor old school tracks. These latest changes at KHHT led to hints that it was moving towards adopting a current upbeat (and dance-leaning) formula patterned after sister stations WKTU in New York City, WMIA-FM in Miami, and WISX in Philadelphia. All three stations saw good ratings numbers with this formula.

In November 2010, KHHT tweaked its direction again, shifting to a Gold-based rhythmic AC approach and reducing the number of currents. Although it may have had elements of the former KCMG, KHHT had not tilted all the way back to rhythmic oldies or urban AC as most of the music was in line with other soft-leaning rhythmic adult contemporary outlets in nature.

In April 2011, KHHT fired morning host Victor Zaragoza (now at KRBQ in San Francisco). On April 20, the station announced that it would hire Rick Dees, who had hosted morning shows at sister station KIIS-FM and KMVN. At that time, the station dropped the "and R&B" from its slogan (to distance itself from playing current R&B or adult R&B product), effectively making KHHT a full-blown Gold-based rhythmic AC, with emphasis on rhythmic, disco, freestyle, and R&B hits from the 1970s, 80s, 90s, and 2000s. This same approach was also being used at sister stations KHJZ in Honolulu, KFBT in Fresno and WMOV-FM in Norfolk, Virginia, which are targeting Gen-Xers and concentrate on the latter two decades and play some currents in their presentation. Shortly after Dees arrived, KHHT shifted its format to a hybrid of rhythmic oldies and urban oldies, focusing mostly on urban rhythmic hits from 1970 to the late 1990s, with some soul hits from the 1960s sprinkled into the mix. However, on July 3, 2012, a year after making a return to morning drive, Dees parted ways with KHHT due to a desire by station management to make some adjustments in its direction.

As of March 5, 2015, the KHHT call letters are assigned to a rhythmic oldies-formatted station serving Bakersfield, California.

=== KRRL ===
On February 5, 2015, iHeartMedia announced it was changing KHHT back to urban contemporary the following morning. The announcement came just a day after KHHT's HD3 sub-channel launched with Air 1 and just a few hours after KPWR's morning host Big Boy announced he would leave KPWR for KHHT. (Since then, he was served a lawsuit by KPWR's parent company Emmis Communications for breach of contract, thus preventing him from joining the station until his contract or his injunction was lifted; he would join the station on March 9.) Another reason for the change was the station's poor ratings performance; KHHT was ranked 14th in the market with a 2.5 share in the January 2015 PPM Nielsen radio ratings. The entire "Hot" airstaff was released (including Art Laboe, who would later end up on KDAY) on the same day as the announcement, as KHHT began promoting a "major announcement" at 9:23 a.m. the following morning, and running a "300 Greatest Hot Songs of All Time" countdown set to conclude at that time.

At the promised time, after playing "My Girl" by The Temptations (the number 1 song in the aforementioned countdown) and "End of the Road" by Boyz II Men, KHHT changed back to urban, branded as "Real 92.3", launching with "10,000 joints in a row", beginning with "Only" and "Truffle Butter", both by Nicki Minaj. The change put 92.3 back in direct competition with KPWR, as well as sister station KGGI, and returned the urban format to the 92.3 FM frequency for the first time since the 2000 format swap with 100.3 FM. The change also returns the urban format to the market for the first time since 2006, when KKBT changed to urban AC as KRBV. On February 20, 2015, KHHT changed its call letters to KRRL to match the "Real" moniker.

As of August 2018, the American cable channel FM now carries an edited video simulcast of the station's morning show, Big Boy's Neighborhood, weeknights and mornings.

== HD Radio ==
The HD2 subchannel carries an all-news radio format, utilizing programming from the Black Information Network. The HD3 subchannel relayed KTLW in Lancaster, which carried Educational Media Foundation (EMF)'s Air1 format; the subchannel acted as a programming source to a network of analog translators throughout the southern portion of Los Angeles and Orange counties. With the purchase of KSWD by EMF, the feeder source has since moved to what is now KKLQ's HD2 subchannel.

== Awards ==
The station was one of 10 stations awarded the 2007 Crystal Radio Award for public service awarded by the National Association of Broadcasters. Winners were honored at the Radio Luncheon on April 17, 2007, during the NAB Show in Las Vegas, Nevada.

== In popular culture ==
=== Music ===
- In Tupac Shakur's song "To Live & Die in L.A." (released under the stage name Makaveli and featuring Val Young), he says, "...This go out for 92.3 and 106. All the radio stations that be bumping my shit. Making my shit sells katruple quitraple platinum..." The station is mentioned alongside KPWR and KDAY.
- Eminem did freestyles at KRRL during its time as KKBT in 1998 that caught the attention of Dr. Dre.
