= KIIS-FM =

Contemporary hit radio station in Los Angeles

- Los Angeles, California; United States
- Broadcast area: Greater Los Angeles; Southern California
- Frequency: 102.7 MHz (HD Radio)
- RDS: KIIS-FM LA
- Branding: 102.7 KIIS FM

Programming
- Language: English
- Format: Contemporary hit radio
- Affiliations: Premiere Networks

Ownership
- Owner: iHeartMedia; (iHM Licenses, LLC)
- Sister stations: KBIG; KEIB; KFI; KLAC; KOST; KRRL; KSRY; KVVS; KYSR

History
- First air date: March 7, 1961
- Former call signs: KLAC-FM (1961–1965); KRHM (1965–1971); KKDJ (1971–1975); KIIS (1981–1984)
- Call sign meaning: Carried over from KIIS (1150 AM), now KEIB; "IIS" is visibly similar to the abbreviated "115(0)" frequency position and phonetically similar to "KISS"

Technical information
- Licensing authority: FCC
- Facility ID: 19218
- Class: B
- ERP: 8,000 watts
- HAAT: 902 meters (2,959 ft)
- Transmitter coordinates: 34°13′36″N 118°4′0.2″W
- Repeaters: 102.7 KIIS-FM1 (Santa Clarita); 105.5 KVVS (Rosamond)

Links
- Public license information: Public file; LMS
- Webcast: Listen live (via iHeartRadio); HD2: Listen live (via iHeartRadio)
- Website: kiisfm.iheart.com; HD2: evolution.iheart.com

KIIS-FM (102.7 FM, "102.7 KIIS FM") is a commercial radio station licensed to Los Angeles, California, United States, and broadcasts to the Greater Los Angeles area. The station airs a contemporary hit radio format. Owned by iHeartMedia, KIIS-FM is the origin of the conglomerate's KISS-FM brand (with the call sign pronounced as "kiss"), and serves as the flagship station for the radio program On Air with Ryan Seacrest (although the KIIS version includes features not heard in the syndicated version, such as local traffic and weather as well as other locally relevant topics). KIIS-FM's studios are located in Burbank, while the station transmitter resides on Mount Wilson, north of Los Angeles.

KIIS-FM extends its on-air signal by using a single full-power repeater, KVVS (105.5 FM) in Rosamond, California. KIIS-FM has consistently been rated the number-one radio station in the Los Angeles/Orange County and Ventura County markets, averaging nearly one million listeners.

As of December 2021, KIIS-FM is the only Top 40 station in the Los Angeles area, after Audacy's KNOU flipped to a simulcast of KNX and changed its callsign to KNX-FM.

== History ==
=== KLAC/KRHM ===
The station on 102.7 MHz first signed on the air in 1961, as KLAC-FM, a sister station to KLAC (570 AM). It swapped frequencies with KRHM (which had gone on the air on 94.7 FM in 1948, as KFMV) in 1965.

=== KKDJ/K-Double-I-S ===
KRHM changed its call sign to KKDJ and flipped to contemporary hit radio (CHR, also known as Top 40) on April 15, 1971. The format lasted until 1975, when Combined Communications purchased KKDJ. The station's format was changed to adult contemporary on October 22, 1975, at 6:00 am, during Charlie Tuna's morning show when KKDJ began simulcasting with KIIS (1150 AM) with an on-air mock wedding, with KKDJ "marrying" KIIS. Meanwhile, KKDJ's callsign was changed to KIIS-FM. The spelling of "K-I-I-S" instead of KISS was because it resembled the AM frequency: "1150" = "IIS". The new merged station was referred to as "AM and FM, K-double-I-S".

Making the transition from KKDJ to KIIS-FM were popular disc jockeys including Humble Harve, Jay Stevens, John Peters, Danny Martinez, and Charlie Tuna. Tuna, an iconic voice of Los Angeles radio, served as both program director and morning show host for KKDJ and KIIS-FM at the transition; he died in February 2016. In 1977, KIIS-FM hired Gary McKenzie as its news director; later, he went on to anchor at RKO Radio Networks and CBS. The AM and FM stations did simulcasts during the day while returning to two separate stations in the evening hours.

=== 102.7 KIIS-FM ===
Unable to draw high ratings with adult contemporary, KIIS-FM began to evolve, first to Top 40 in 1976, then dance and disco music in 1978, and back to Top 40 in 1980. KIIS (AM) would keep its soft rock/AC format until late 1979. Just prior to this, Gannett Company purchased both the KIIS-AM-FM station pair and Combined Communications. In 1981, the format of KIIS (AM) was changed to Christian talk and teaching and the new call sign KPRZ was adopted.

Rick Dees joined the station for mornings in July 1981, after KHJ switched formats to country music. Fill-in personality Dave Sebastian (Williams), working both the AM and FM stations at the time, hosted the vacated FM morning show until the arrival of Dees due to a non-compete clause in his contract. With Dees in mornings, KIIS became a CHR powerhouse in Los Angeles.

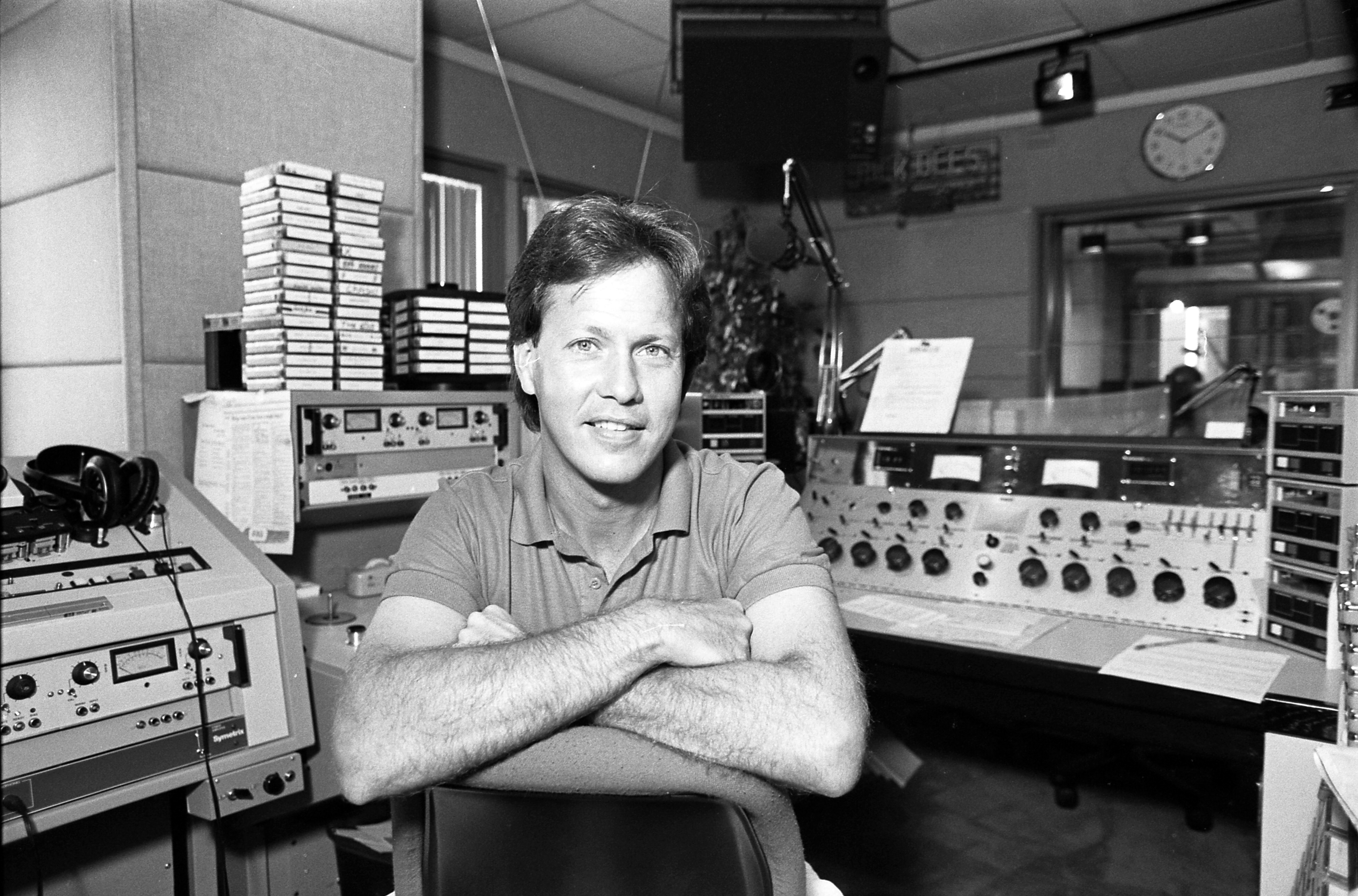
Rick Dees in the KIIS studio, 1986

In 1985, KIIS (AM) returned to a Top 40 format and simulcast KIIS-FM's morning and afternoon shows, while all other dayparts had different disc jockeys. This would last until around 1988, when it transitioned to a full-time simulcast when the Federal Communications Commission (FCC) relaxed the rules on major-market stations simulcasting each other. The simulcast continued until 1997, when the AM station flipped to sports radio as KXTA, simulcasting with XETRA-AM in Tijuana/San Diego until 2005.

In a 1996 deal, Gannett traded KIIS-AM-FM to Jacor/Citicasters in exchange for that company’s television station in Tampa, WTSP. Jacor/Citicasters merged into Clear Channel Communications, which would change its name to the present-day iHeartMedia. After Clear Channel's acquisition of KAVS and KYHT, the two High Desert stations abandoned their previous modern rock format and together began serving as repeaters for KIIS-FM. Another simulcast, KIIS (1220 AM) in Santa Clarita, was added in 1999, as well as KFMS (101.9 FM) in Las Vegas.

The grouping of KIIS-FM in Los Angeles, KIIS in Santa Clarita, KAVS (97.7 FM) in the Antelope Valley, KYHT (105.3 FM) in Barstow—Victor Valley, and KFMS in Las Vegas created nearly continuous coverage of KIIS-FM between Los Angeles and Las Vegas. (KFMS was branded as "KISS" instead of "KIIS"). However, this regional network was short-lived as KYHT broke its simulcast off in 2001, to become a repeater for KZXY-FM. Resulting from KYHT's flip from the KIIS-FM moniker, KFMS switched to all-local programming. KAVS was relocated from 97.7 to 105.5 FM in December 2007, and adopted the call sign KVVS. KIIS (AM) became KHTS in 2003. KIIS-FM was also simulcast on 850 AM in Thousand Oaks, California in the last year before that station's towers were demolished.

In February 2004, the decade-long general manager of KIIS-FM, Roy Laughlin, elected not to renew Rick Dees' contract, replacing him with Ryan Seacrest from sister station KYSR and retaining co-host Ellen K to team with Seacrest. Together, they created the nationally syndicated On Air with Ryan Seacrest, which airs on many of iHeartMedia's Top 40/CHR stations. The KIIS-FM version is more localized when compared to other stations carrying the show.

Trade publication Radio & Records named KIIS-FM its 2007 "Station of the Year" in the contemporary hit radio/Top 40 category for market size 1–25 at its national convention.

In December 2007, KIIS-FM's Antelope Valley simulcast on KOSS (97.7 FM) was moved to 105.5 FM, replacing the previous format as "105.5 The Oasis". The country music format at 103.1 FM in Tehachapi, California was moved to 97.7 FM (now operating under 103.1's former call letters KTPI-FM) and is now branded as 97.7 KTPI. KSRY (103.1 FM) in Tehachapi became a simulcast of KYSR (98.7 FM, "Alt 98-7").

The station was, according to Radio & Records in 2008, the second-highest revenue billing radio station in the United States (behind WTOP-FM in Washington, D.C.), with $66.3 million. In 2010, the station was honored by the National Association of Broadcasters with the Marconi Award for CHR Station of the Year.

On June 8, 2011, KIIS-FM began rebroadcasting on SiriusXM channel 11. At the end of 2003, Clear Channel replaced the KIIS simulcast with an exclusive KISS XM channel. In 2004, all XM music channels went commercial-free, and KIIS-FM was replaced with a unique-to-XM "KISS-XM" channel, retaining the same format. Since then, Clear Channel/iHeartMedia has regained the right to air commercials on their XM music channels. On June 1, 2022, the KIIS-FM simulcast left SiriusXM, with the launch and establishment of the free iHeartRadio platform making the arrangement less important.

In May 2017, Seacrest became co-host of the New York City-based syndicated talk show Live with Kelly. To accommodate the new role, it was announced that Seacrest would begin to host On Air from a studio constructed at the facilities of WABC-TV (where the TV show is produced). The KIIS-FM show continued to air live, although the first hour was either pre-recorded or handled mostly by co-host Sisanie.

In October 2023, the station launched a new weekly K-pop show, K-Pop With Jojo, hosted by KIIS-FM afternoon host JoJo Wright. In January 2024, iHeartMedia began to syndicate the show to most iHeartMedia CHR stations.

== HD Radio ==
=== KIIS-HD2 ===
KIIS-FM's HD2 subchannel originally broadcast IHeartRadio's all-dance "Evolution" network. In June 2019, KIIS-FM's HD2 subchannel stopped broadcasting the "Evolution" network and flipped to a simulcast of the analog audio with a 10-second delay.

== See also ==
- Kevin Poulsen
