= KSRY =

Simulcast of KYSR, Los Angeles
- Tehachapi, California; United States
- Broadcast area: Lancaster-Palmdale, California
- Frequency: 103.1 MHz
- Branding: Alt 98.7 (simulcast)

Programming
- Format: Alternative rock
- Affiliations: Compass Media Networks; iHeartRadio; Premiere Networks; National Football League; Los Angeles Chargers Radio Network

Ownership
- Owner: iHeartMedia, Inc.; (iHM Licenses, LLC)
- Sister stations: KBIG; KEIB; KFI; KIIS-FM; KLAC; KOST; KRRL; KVVS; KYSR

History
- First air date: 1981
- Former call signs: KTPI (1981–2002); KTPI-FM (2002–2008); KOSS (2008)
- Call sign meaning: Derived from KYSR

Technical information
- Licensing authority: FCC
- Facility ID: 66228
- Class: A
- ERP: 1,900 watts
- HAAT: 176 meters (577 ft)
- Transmitter coordinates: 35°4′30″N 118°22′8″W

Links
- Public license information: Public file; LMS
- Webcast: Listen live (via iHeartRadio)
- Website: alt987fm.iheart.com

KSRY (103.1 FM) is a radio station broadcasting an alternative rock format as a simulcast of KYSR (Alt 98.7) in Los Angeles, California. KSRY serves the Antelope Valley from its tower in Tehachapi, California. The station is owned by iHeartMedia, Inc.

== History ==
The station was started by George Chambers in 1981 as KTPI, and was the first radio station licensed to Tehachapi, California. In 1983, Robert Adelman joined Chambers and created the first country music FM radio station (KTPI-FM) to serve the Antelope Valley with a signal covering the entire area. Mark Pompey was the first program director and later Larry Marino (who later moved to KRLA) served as operations manager of this station and another in Mojave, KDOL (1340 AM). Studios were located in Mojave until they were moved to Palmdale. Chambers and Adelman sold KTPI and KDOL to HPW in 1986. In December 2007, KTPI-FM's format moved to 97.7 in Mojave while 103.1 became a simulcast of KYSR, Los Angeles "Star 98.7". On January 2, 2008, the KTPI call letters were moved to 97.7, and the KOSS call letters came to 103.1 FM. On January 10, 2008, the KOSS call sign was changed to KSRY. The only mentions of KSRY are in legal ID sweepers that are only heard on the 103.1 signal.

The tower is shared with KKZQ (100.1 FM, "The Quake"), owned by High Desert Broadcasting.

== Programming ==
KSRY carries all programming originating from KYSR; this includes KYSR personalities and syndicated The Woody Show in mornings;.
