= KYSR =

Alternative rock radio station in Los Angeles

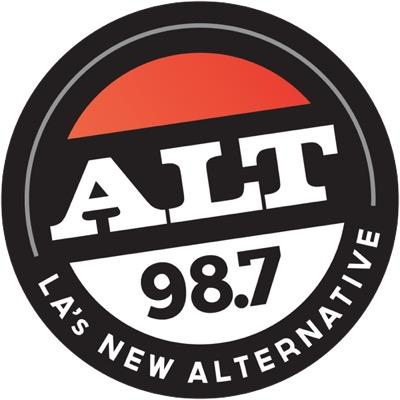
- Los Angeles, California; United States
- Broadcast area: Greater Los Angeles
- Frequency: 98.7 MHz (HD Radio)
- Branding: ALT 98-7

Programming
- Format: Alternative rock
- Subchannels: HD2: TikTok radio
- Affiliations: Compass Media Networks; iHeartRadio; Premiere Networks; Los Angeles Chargers Radio Network

Ownership
- Owner: iHeartMedia; (iHM Licenses, LLC)
- Sister stations: KBIG; KEIB; KFI; KIIS-FM; KLAC; KOST; KRRL; KSRY; KVVS

History
- First air date: May 27, 1948
- Former call signs: KMGM (1948–1954); KCBH (1954–1970); KJOI (1970–1990); KXEZ (1990–1992)
- Call sign meaning: "Your Star" (former branding)

Technical information
- Licensing authority: FCC
- Facility ID: 36019
- Class: B
- ERP: 75,000 watts
- HAAT: 360 meters (1,180 ft)
- Transmitter coordinates: 34°07′8″N 118°23′30″W
- Repeater: 103.1 KSRY (Tehachapi)

Links
- Public license information: Public file; LMS
- Webcast: Listen live (via iHeartRadio)
- Website: alt987fm.iheart.com

KYSR (98.7 FM) is a commercial radio station licensed to Los Angeles, California, and owned by iHeartMedia. KYSR broadcasts an alternative rock format and is the flagship station of The Woody Show. KYSR's studios are located in Burbank, while the transmitter is in the Santa Monica Mountains on Briarcrest Peak in Beverly Hills. KYSR broadcasts using HD Radio technology; its HD-2 digital subchannel is currently broadcasting TikTok Radio. KYSR is also heard in the Antelope Valley on KSRY (103.1 FM) in Tehachapi.

== History ==
=== KMGM and KCBH (1948–1970) ===
This station was built by movie studio Metro-Goldwyn-Mayer and originally had the call sign KMGM. It signed on the air on May 27, 1948. In that era, few people owned radios equipped to receive FM signals. KMGM suspended operations in 1953.

The film studio sold KMGM's studio and transmitter to Art and Jean Crawford. They relaunched 98.7 FM on June 30, 1954, using the call letters KCBH. The couple owned Crawford's of Beverly Hills Record & Hi-Fi Store, and used their store's inventory as a record library for the station.

=== KJOI and KXEZ (1970–1992) ===
In October 1970, the station became "K-Joy" KJOI. It played beautiful music for nearly two decades. The sound was largely instrumental with quarter hour sweeps of soft music including an occasional vocal. In 1976, KJOI was acquired by Command Communications.

By 1989, KJOI began playing fewer instrumental cover versions of popular songs and added more vocalists to the playlist, eschewing middle of the road songs in favor of soft adult contemporary. Instrumentals were dropped altogether in November 1989, when the station became known as "Touch 98.7", positioned between smooth jazz-formatted KTWV and soft AC-formatted KOST.

On February 12, 1990, the call sign was changed to KXEZ. The format was altered to "Easy Oldies".

=== KYSR Star 98.7 (1992–1995) ===
On August 21, 1992, KXEZ became "Star 98.7", KYSR. In the beginning, KYSR aired an adult contemporary music format. By 1993, the tempo was picked up and Star 98.7 evolved into hot adult contemporary. Also in 1993, Viacom acquired the station for $40 million.

MTV VJ Mark Goodman was heard on KYSR from 1996 to 1997; no official reason for his departure was given, but his father died shortly before his departure. Ryan Seacrest co-hosted KYSR's afternoon drive program with Lisa Foxx from 1995 to 2003; both hosts were among the top rated afternoon drive shows in Los Angeles for seven years.

=== Modern AC (1995–2007) ===
By mid-1995, KYSR adjusted its format by dropping most of the rhythmic and soft rock tunes, shifting to a pop-leaning modern rock direction, minus the harder approach embraced by the more mainstream alternative KROQ. This version of Hot AC was called "modern adult contemporary", and became one of the first stations in the U.S. with the format. Viacom sold their radio assets to Chancellor Media in 1997. The company was renamed AMFM Inc., after Chancellor merged with Capstar in 1999.

In 2000, AMFM Inc. merged with its current owner, Clear Channel Communications, now known as iHeartMedia, Inc. Coincidentally, around this time, Viacom became the owners of KROQ when that station's parent company, CBS, merged with Viacom.

Jamie, Frosty & Frank were hired as hosts for KYSR's morning drive program in 1998; Frosty Stilwell and Frank Kramer were fired on September 15, 1999, and Jamie White was paired with Danny Bonaduce. Bonaduce departed on July 1, 2005; his vacancy was filled by board-op Jack Heine and producer Mike "Stench" Roberts.

Starting in 2002, KYSR began to experience a drop in its ratings due to a combination of factors, including the decline of hit music product in the modern adult contemporary genre. The ratings loss was compounded later by KCBS-FM's switch to an adult hits format known as "JACK-FM". In September 2005, KYSR adjusted its playlist to focus on 1980s and 1990s hot adult contemporary music, supervised by sister station KHHT program director Mike Marino.

By April 2006, KYSR moved back to a modern adult contemporary music format with the tag line of "Today's Music Alternative". In addition, all on air personalities, including the morning show Jamie, Jack, and Stench, were temporarily pulled off the station. Fans of the morning show were upset by this move, which included a public protest outside the station. Shortly afterwards, a poll was offered on the KYSR website asking if the listeners wanted Jamie, Jack and Stench to return. Ninety-seven percent said yes, and a week later, they returned to the air. However, Jamie, Jack and Stench were replaced a year later by the morning team of Sean Valentine and Lisa Foxx in 2007.

=== 98-7 FM (2007–2013) ===
On September 20, 2007, KYSR re-positioned itself as "98-7 FM", officially dropping the "Star" branding after 15 years. The station moved to a mainstream Alternative Rock format, aimed more at young men, rather than Modern AC, aimed more at young women. While KYSR still reported to broadcasting trade publications as Modern AC, its musical lean favored Modern Rock/Alternative hits with an updated library of alternative titles from the 1980s, 90s and early 2000s, including Nirvana, Green Day, Red Hot Chili Peppers, Pearl Jam, Third Eye Blind and R.E.M. In addition, KYSR played more new modern rock hits from bands such as The Killers, Foo Fighters, Incubus and Linkin Park. This repositioning came three days after sister station KBIG dropped many dance and disco hits, and rebranded as "104.3 MYfm". Effective September 24, 2007, Sean Valentine moved over to the KBIG morning show, replacing Charlie Tuna, whose last show was September 17.

KYSR officially changed positioning from Modern AC to Alternative in 2008 to compete with 106.7 KROQ. While the core artists largely remained the same and leaned more in a pop direction than most alternative rock stations, the station's imaging was changed, along with a new logo holding the numbers 98 and 7 in Gothic typeface with a metallic star between the numerals. Both R&R/Nielsen BDS and Mediabase concurrently added KYSR as an alternative/modern rock reporter.

=== Alt 98-7 (2013–present) ===
On August 9, 2013, the station rebranded as "ALT 98-7", with no other change to the format.

The Woody Show began airing in mornings on April 21, 2014. The cast includes the host "Woody" Fife, Greg Gory, Morgan Cook (associate Producer), Sammi Marino (executive producer), Renae Ravey (former), Sebastian "Sebas", Bort, Randy and Jason "Menace" McMurry, who had all last worked together at KITS, an alternative rock station in San Francisco. The show proved so popular that the show began national syndication through Premiere Networks in 2016.

On March 9, 2020, iHeart announced that KYSR will air Los Angeles Chargers football games as the team's new flagship station beginning with the 2020 season. In addition to carrying the games, KYSR also runs Chargers contests and sweepstakes, with prizes including game tickets and official merchandise. The Chargers broadcasts will only be heard on FM radio, while listeners on the iHeartRadio app (including Los Angeles) will get normal music programming.

They also host an annual Alter Ego radio festival in January:

Year	Date	Venue	Lineup (Reverse Performance Order)
2026	Jan 17	Kia Forum	Green Day, Twenty One Pilots, Sublime, Mt. Joy, Good Charlotte, Gigi Perez, almost monday, Cage the Elephant (Cancelled: Myles Smith)
2025	Jan 11	Kia Forum	Canceled due to Los Angeles wildfires. Scheduled: The Offspring, The Lumineers, The Head and the Heart, Incubus, St. Vincent, Glass Animals, Fontaines D.C., Cage the Elephant
2024	Jan 13	Honda Center	Fall Out Boy, Thirty Seconds to Mars, The Last Dinner Party, Bush, The 1975, Sum 41, lovelytheband, Yellowcard, The Black Keys (Cancelled: Paramore)
2023	Jan 14	Kia Forum	Red Hot Chili Peppers, Jack White, Chvrches, Muse, Beach Weather, Phoenix, Rosa Linn, Fall Out Boy
2022	Jan 15	Kia Forum	Twenty One Pilots, All Time Low, Kings of Leon, Willow, Coldplay, Måneskin, Imagine Dragons
2021	Jan 28	Virtual	Foo Fighters, Billie Eilish (Featured archival: Muse, The Killers, Coldplay, Cage the Elephant, Twenty One Pilots)
2020	Jan 18	Kia Forum	The Black Keys, The Lumineers, SHAED, Coldplay, Rex Orange County, Blink-182, Billie Eilish
2019	Jan 19	Kia Forum	Muse, The Killers, Weezer, Bishop Briggs, Rise Against, The Revivalists, Twenty One Pilots
2018	Jan 19	Kia Forum	Cage the Elephant, Beck, The National, Dashboard Confessional, Walk the Moon, Spoon, Mumford & Sons, AJR

== HD Radio ==
KYSR-HD2 formerly broadcast an adult album alternative format known as "eRockster". It was a national online music and social networking portal, syndicated FM radio show and HD subchannel radio station that offered listeners the opportunity to participate in building and programming the radio station.

The HD-2 subchannel later aired an active rock iHeartRadio channel known as "Rock Nation". KYSR-HD2 later began simulcasting co-owned sports radio KLAC until March 12, 2026, when 28 iHeartMedia-owned HD subchannels, including KYSR-HD2, began stunting with a ticking clock. The subchannel flipped to contemporary hit radio as "TikTok Radio" the next day at 7:00 PM. KLAC's HD radio signal moved to 104.3 KBIG-HD2.

== Past Personalities ==
- Nighttime personality Skip Kelly was heard from 2002 until May 2004.
- Richard Blade, previously on KROQ-FM, was hired by KYSR in 2003 but was later fired and replaced by Summer James.
- Josh Venable, formerly late-nights/music director at KDGE in Dallas, took over afternoon drive January 2008.
- Justin Kade, formerly nights and middays, left in April 2016 to join morning's on Sirius XM's Alt Nation.
- On June 1, 2008, Marco Collins, formerly afternoon drive at XETRA-FM San Diego 91X, became the new midday DJ for Alternative KYSR.
- On October 16, 2008, rock band Ozomatli exited as the morning show because of low ratings and conflicts with their concert tour.
- Kennedy hosted "Music in the Mornings" from 2009 to March 2014.
- Rog Martin hosted a show on KCBH-FM (now KYSR) in Los Angeles from 1967 to 1969.
- Ryan Seacrest hosted afternoons on the station from 1995 to 2003, when he mornings at sister-station KIIS-FM.
- Jamie White hosted mornings with various co-hosts from 1998-2007.
- Former child actor Danny Bonaduce was part of the morning show from 1999-2005.
