= Charlie Tuna =

American radio personality and television host (1944–2016)

- Born: Arthur W. Ferguson; April 18, 1944; Kearney, Nebraska, U.S.
- Died: February 19, 2016 (aged 71); Tarzana, California, U.S.
- Resting place: Forest Lawn Memorial Park (Glendale)
- Occupation: Radio personality
- Children: 4
- Presenting career
- Stations: KRTH, KLAC-AM, KROQ, KIK-FM, Ten-Q, KMPC-AM, KKDJ-AM, KHJ, KCBS-FM, KIIS, KHTZ
- Time slot: 6:00 a.m. – 11:00 a.m. Saturday; 10:00 a.m. – 2:00 p.m. Sunday
- Country: United States

Arthur W. Ferguson (April 18, 1944 – February 19, 2016), known professionally as Charlie Tuna, was an American radio personality and television host based in Los Angeles, California.

== Career ==
=== Radio ===
At age 16, Tuna began working at his hometown's radio station, KGFW. Then, he went to work at KLEO in Wichita, Kansas, for a year with the air name "Billy O'Day". He then worked for KOMA Radio in Oklahoma City in 1966, where he took over the "Charlie Tuna" pseudonym from Chuck Riley, who had used it for one show the week before Tuna's arrival. Tuna then moved on to WMEX in Boston for the first 9 months of 1967.

In late 1967, KHJ in Los Angeles offered Tuna the 9 to noon slot, where he debuted on Thanksgiving Day 1967. On February 9, 1971, he had just begun his morning show at 6:00 a.m. when the San Fernando earthquake occurred. In early 1972 he did mornings at KCBQ in San Diego (during the original presentation of "The Last Contest") and later that year became one of the original DJs at KROQ AM, a new Top 40 station (formerly Country KBBQ). In 1973 he moved to KKDJ as program director and morning personality. He presided over its 1975 call-letter change to KIIS, and broadcast the first show at KIIS-FM as it began its AM/FM simulcast. He also worked at KTNQ, KHTZ (later KBZT), KRLA, KIQQ, (K100), KODJ (later KCBS-FM), KMPC, KIKF, and KLAC.

He worked at KBIG 104.3, where he hosted a long-running morning show Charlie Tuna in the Morning which aired from 5 to 10 am. His last full-time morning show aired on September 17, 2007, when the station flipped to a non-rhythmic-based adult contemporary format, as 104.3 My FM. He returned to radio February 9, 2008, when he became the weekend personality on Los Angeles oldies station K-Earth 101. CBS on August 27, 2015, began downsizing their stations in Los Angeles, at which point Charlie moved on to expand his syndicated radio business with CharlieTunaSyndication.com.

Tuna served as announcer for Casey Kasem on his 1980s television program America's Top 10, and occasionally filled in for Kasem on his radio programs American Top 20 and American Top 10. He co-hosted Your Good Time Oldies Magazine from 1992 to 1995, and he produced and hosted 52 weekly episodes of Back to the 70s, which were rerun at radio stations across the country until 2008. (Tuna was replaced as host of Back to the 70s by M. G. Kelly, who served as the show's syndicator.) Beginning in 1986, Tuna began hosting the National Music Survey, an adult contemporary formatted program by Westwood One, first led by Dick Clark, and serves a total of 300 AC stations in the United States. This lasted until the show's cancellation in 1990.

Tuna had a year-long run in 2009 of a 5-hour classic hits daily and weekend show, syndicated through United Stations Radio Network in New York. He joined Black Card Radio in Los Angeles in 2010 as host of a 5-hour weekend show Charlie Tuna – The 70's, which is distributed nationally and internationally, and later added a 5-hour daily and weekend show for all radio formats. He moved his radio station voice imaging business to Black Card Radio later that year. In 2011 he introduced the syndicated "Charlie Tuna's Hollywood Minute", 4 to 5 top entertainment stories each day. Tuna reunited with United Stations Radio Network in New York in 2013 to do the ad sales for his Black Card Radio shows.

Tuna broadcast approximately 6,000 radio shows from 1971 through 1996 on the American Forces Radio Network.

=== Television ===
Tuna hosted Cinema, Cinema, Cinema for 30 years, an internationally syndicated TV show, featuring the top movies in the US each week with clips from the films, and another international TV show Inside Hollywood for three years. He has been the announcer on a number of television game shows, including Time Machine, Scrabble, Scattergories, The $25,000 Pyramid, The Quiz Kids Challenge, and The New Battlestars. He was also the announcer for the last two years of television's syndicated Mike Douglas Show and Alan Thicke's late night TV show Thicke of the Night. From 2012 to 2014, he became the voice of Los Angeles (Anaheim) independent station KDOC-TV.

=== Film ===
Tuna appeared in the 1977 Universal movie Rollercoaster as emcee at the grand opening celebration of the amusement park ride "The Revolution" at the Magic Mountain Amusement Park near Valencia, California. He played a TV announcer in the 1979 independent film Racquet starring Bert Convy, Lynda Day George, Edie Adams, Tanya Roberts, and Björn Borg.

=== Event host ===
Tuna raised nearly US$2.5 million for Children's Hospital Los Angeles with his annual Tunathon (2004–2007), hosted the red carpet, and emceed the Revlon Run/Walk for five years (2003–2007). He emceed the annual Warner Park 4th of July celebration in Woodland Hills, which attracts crowds of over 50,000 annually.

== Personal life and death ==
Born in Kearney, Nebraska, Tuna was a high school athlete and sports editor of his school newspaper.

Tuna spent the last years of his life in the Los Angeles neighborhood of Tarzana, where he served as the community's Honorary Mayor from 1977. He died in his sleep on February 19, 2016, at his home, aged 71.

He is interred in the Forest Lawn Memorial Park (Glendale).

== Recognition and awards ==
Tuna received a star on the Hollywood Walk of Fame (as "Charlie Tuna") in January 1990, and was inducted into the Nebraska Broadcasters Association Hall of Fame in 1999. On July 18, 2008, he was voted into the National Radio Hall of Fame (NRHOF). He was inducted in Chicago by his longtime friend Larry Lujack on November 8, 2008. On September 18, 2010, Tuna was presented a Lifetime Achievement Award and inducted into the Route 66 Cruisin' Hall of Fame in San Bernardino, California. In 1997, Los Angeles Radio People readers voted him one of the Top 10 L.A. Radio Personalities of All Time, and he was elected by his LARadio.com broadcast peers as one of 2007 & 2013's Top 10 Los Angeles Radio Personalities.
