= Josh Venable =

Radio DJ

Josh Venable (born March 31) is a radio personality best known for hosting The Adventure Club on 102.1 The Edge in Dallas. He is currently heard on Z104.5 in Tulsa.

He is known for bashing bands on-air and for discussing his personal life.

== Career ==
=== Education and early work ===
Venable attended Grapevine High School and the University of North Texas. Given a high school internship by George Gimarc, he worked his way up to helping out with shows like The Adventure Club and The Retro Show"

=== The Adventure Club ===
The Adventure Club aired intermittently on KYSR and KDGE, playing a mix of American and British indie rock, local, punk and classic alternative music. The show was responsible for breaking Texas bands such as Old 97's and The Polyphonic Spree, as well as internationally recognized bands such as Weezer, Coldplay, and Oasis.

When the original host of The Adventure Club (Alex Luke) left for another job in St. Louis, Venable—though still inexperienced—was offered the hosting job in 1994. He asked fellow KDGE employee Keven McAlester to co-host.

McAlester left the show in 1997 for the film industry in LA; he went on to direct the feature You're Gonna Miss Me as well as music videos for Spoon and Old 97's.

Venable, who worked late nights, overnights, and weekends, was promoted to music director at 102.1 The Edge in 2006. He was laid off in 2007 due to budget constraints at Clear Channel. He found a job at 98.7FM KYSR in Los Angeles doing "afternoon drive" from 2 pm–7 pm. In February 2008, KDGE rehired Venable to do nights remotely from Los Angeles. The Adventure Club was brought back in July 2008. He later switched to the 10am–2 pm shift in Dallas.

=== Later work ===
Venable became music director of KYSR in 2009 and moved back to DFW to become program director of KDGE in 2011.

After being laid off again in December 2012, he started a music blog called A Wide Open Space.

In 2013, he was hired by Tulsa alternative rock station KMYZ as program director and afternoon personality. In 2015, he moved to the morning show at KMYZ.

In the fall of 2021, Artifacts: Live at the Adventure Club was released. This double vinyl collection was of DFW bands Venable had recorded in the radio studio. The proceeds went to charity and included The Rocket Summer, Eisley, and Old 97's.

== Personal life ==
Venable's favorite bands include The Smiths, The Cure, R.E.M. and Bruce Springsteen. He sang in tribute/cover bands dedicated to Bruce Springsteen and The Smiths, and he has stated many times on-air that he wished he were a rock star. The Springsteen tribute band, which made annual performances, was called "Nightmare On E Street." It included members of the bands [DARYL], The Crash That Took Me, Long Sword Spectacular, Macavity and Here, In Arms. Panic (Smiths tribute) has been active since 2012. They were once named best cover band in DFW by the Dallas Observer magazine. Over the years, they have opened for Blue October, New Politics and Andrew McMahon.

== On-air schedule ==
- 104.5 KMYZ, Tulsa, 6A-10A

== Awards and nominations ==
Year	Award	Category
1995	Dallas Observer Music Awards	Best Radio Program That Plays Local Music
1997	Fort Worth Weekly	Best Local Radio Show Staff Choice
1997	Dallas Observer Music Awards	Radio Program That Features Local Music: The Adventure Club, KDGE 94.5 FM
1998	Dallas Observer Music Awards	Best DJ In Dallas Critic's Choice
1998	Dallas Observer Music Awards	Radio Program/Local Music: The Adventure Club, KDGE-FM (94.5)
1999	Fort Worth Weekly	Best Local Radio Show Staff Choice
2001	Dallas Observer Music Awards	Best Radio Program That Plays Local Music
2002	Dallas Observer Music Awards	Radio Program That Plays Local Music: The Adventure Club, KDGE 94.5FM
2003	Dallas Observer Music Awards	Radio Program That Plays Local Music: The Adventure Club, KDGE 94.5FM
2004	Dallas Observer Music Awards	Radio Program That Plays Local Music: The Adventure Club, KDGE 94.5FM
2005	Dallas Observer Music Awards	Radio Program That Plays Local Music: The Adventure Club, KDGE 94.5FM
2005	FW Weekly 2005 Best of the West Issue	Best Radio DJ Staff Choice: Josh Venable, KDGE/102.1-FM The Edge
2005	FW Weekly 2005 Best Of The West Issue	Best Radio Show Staff Choice: The Adventure Club, KDGE/102.1-FM The Edge
2006	Dallas Observer Music Awards	Best Radio Show That Plays Local Music: The Adventure Club, 102.1 The Edge
2007	Dallas Observer Awards	Best Radio Show That Plays Local Music: The Adventure Club, 102.1 The Edge
