= Martini In The Morning =

American internet radio station

Martini In The Morning is an internet radio station based in Los Angeles. Martini in the Morning, often shortened to "MITM" to resemble traditional radio station call letters, was created when Los Angeles radio station Fabulous 690 XETRA (originally Fabulous 570 KLAC) was sold in February 2006, to become a Spanish language station.

Brad 'Martini' Chambers who created the new, more contemporary "adult standards" format for his then employers, Clear Channel Radio is the Program Director and principal host along with 'Mother' Miriam Garfield. The station broadcasts 24 hours a day and is based in Studio City, Ca. Their broadcast format is similar to what is commonly referred to as adult standards, featuring jazz standards, primarily songs from what is often referred to as "The Great American Songbook". The station is active in promoting the genre that the "Great American Songbook" represents and ensuring this musical genre does not disappear from the air. There were once hundreds of American radio stations programming similar music. There are now fewer than 200, and many of those are a mix of "Great American Songbook" tunes with a larger percentage of more current "Adult Contemporary" music.

Martini in the Morning features music written by the likes of Hoagy Carmichael, Cole Porter, Irving Berlin, Rodgers and Hart, Rodgers and Hammerstein, Johnny Mercer, Henry Mancini, Jimmy McHugh, Dorothy Fields, Fats Waller, Jerome Kern, Sammy Cahn, Jimmy Van Heusen, and many others, performed by the historical greats like Ella Fitzgerald, Frank Sinatra, Dean Martin, Sammy Davis Jr., Billie Holiday, Bobby Darin, Dinah Washington as well as the more modern "crooners" like Steve Tyrell, Tony Bennett, Diana Krall, Michael Bublé, Michael Feinstein, and established pop/rock and R&B artists crossing over into the genre, such as Sting, Paul McCartney, Rod Stewart, Queen Latifah, Lady Gaga and others.

The station is available on-line through various means, using iTunes (Golden Oldies), mobile apps including TuneIn Radio, StreamS HiFi, Reciva, vTuner, Radio Loyalty and others available through the App Store or Marketplace, or you can connect directly via internet address: https://web.archive.org/web/20180709092649/http://martinimorning.radio.net/ or watch live in studio on-line during the station's "Morning Show" 6:00 a.m. – 10:00 a.m. Pacific time at https://web.archive.org/web/20140826115804/http://www.martiniinthemorning.com/martinivision.html or via Ustream.tv - http://ustream.tv/mitm .
