= KLAC =

Radio station in Los Angeles

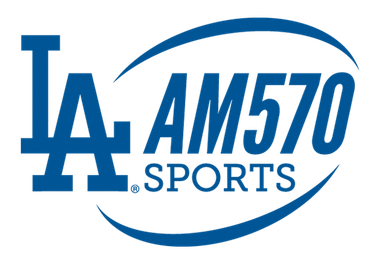
- Los Angeles, California; United States
- Broadcast area: Southern California
- Frequency: 570 kHz
- Branding: AM 570 LA Sports

Programming
- Language: English
- Format: Sports radio
- Affiliations: Fox Sports Radio; Los Angeles Dodgers Audio Network; Los Angeles Clippers Audio Network; Los Angeles Chargers Radio Network

Ownership
- Owner: iHeartMedia, Inc.; Los Angeles Dodgers; (Los Angeles Broadcasting Partners, LLC)
- Sister stations: KBIG; KEIB; KFI; KIIS-FM; KOST; KRRL; KSRY; KVVS; KYSR

History
- First air date: March 1924
- Former call signs: KFPG (1924–1925); KMTR (1925–1946)
- Call sign meaning: Los Angeles, California

Technical information
- Licensing authority: FCC
- Facility ID: 59958
- Class: B
- Power: 5,000 watts
- Transmitter coordinates: 34°4′11″N 118°11′39.3″W
- Repeater: 104.3 KBIG-HD2 (Los Angeles)

Links
- Public license information: Public file; LMS
- Webcast: Listen live (via iHeartRadio)
- Website: am570lasports.iheart.com

KLAC (570 AM) is a commercial sports radio station licensed to Los Angeles, California, serving Greater Los Angeles. Owned by a joint venture between iHeartMedia, Inc. and the Los Angeles Dodgers baseball club, KLAC serves as the Los Angeles affiliate for Fox Sports Radio; the flagship station for the Los Angeles Dodgers Audio Network and the Los Angeles Clippers; and the home of radio personalities Fred Roggin, Rodney Peete, Petros Papadakis and Matt "Money" Smith.

The KLAC studios are located in the Los Angeles suburb of Burbank, while the station transmitter resides in Los Angeles' Lincoln Heights neighborhood. Besides its main analog transmission, KLAC simulcasts over a HD digital subchannel of KBIG and streams online via iHeartRadio.

== History ==
=== Early years ===
KLAC first signed on in 1924 as KFPG. In 1925, it became KMTR, with the call sign chosen for the new owner, K. M. Turner, a radio dealer. In the 1930s, it transmitted with 1,000 watts and had its studios at 915 North Formosa Street.

In 1946, Dorothy Schiff, publisher of the New York Post, bought the station and renamed it KLAC, for Los Angeles, California. During the 1940s, Douglas Adamson worked as a disc jockey on KLAC and was voted one of Billboard magazine's top ten DJs in America. Al Jarvis created his West Coast version of the Make Believe Ballroom; in a KLAC advertisement in the 1947 edition of Broadcasting Yearbook, Jarvis is described as "the dean of the nation's disc jockeys" and the show promised to give away "a new Mercury, diamond rings, etc."

KLAC added a TV station, KLAC-TV at channel 13, on September 17, 1948. Both the radio and TV operations were housed in studios at 1000 North Cahuenga Boulevard in Hollywood. Al Jarvis notably hosted a TV edition of the Make Believe Ballroom, and a young Betty White was part of his staff, Regis Philbin and Leonard Nimoy also worked behind the scenes at the station. KLAC-TV was sold to the Copley Press in 1953, and was renamed KCOP-TV.

Also in 1948, KLAC-FM began experimenting with FM broadcasts. The station official signed on the air on March 7, 1961, as KLAC-FM. It mostly simulcast the AM station. In the late 1960s, it began airing its own programming, a vocal easy listening/MOR sound. In 1975, the station was sold to Combined Communications, later becoming KIIS-FM.

=== Metromedia ownership ===
KLAC and KLAC-FM were purchased by Metromedia in 1963. Metromedia programmed a full service middle of the road (MOR) format of popular music, news and sports, similar to other Metromedia stations such as WNEW in New York City and WHK in Cleveland. KLAC and KLAC-FM at different times featured the talents of Les Crane, Louis Nye, and Lohman and Barkley. Metromedia also owned KTTV (channel 11), and all three stations were housed in studios at Metromedia Square on Sunset Boulevard.

In the mid-1960s, KLAC switched to a talk radio format known as "Two-Way Radio". Hosts included Joe Pyne. In the 1970s, KLAC switched to an adult standards format, playing music from the 1940s and early 1950s, along with soft adult contemporary hits of the 1950s and 1960s. By early 1970, KLAC evolved to more of a full-service mainstream adult contemporary format focusing on popular adult hits from 1964 up to that time.

=== Country music ===
As the 1970s began, Los Angeles had two country music stations, KFOX and KIEV. However, neither station had a signal as powerful as that of KLAC. With this, on September 28, 1970, KLAC, due to the leadership of Ron Martin, decided to drop adult contemporary for country music. The number one on the station's first "Big 57 Survey" was "For The Good Times" by Ray Price.

The original DJs included Deano Day, Gene Price, Harry Newman, Sammy Jackson and Jay Lawrence, joined the following year by Dick Haynes, Charlie O'Donnell and Larry Scott. L.A. veteran DJ Nancy Plum (KTNQ, KMPC) was heard in the last days of the country format.

In the fall of 1980, KLAC got some serious competition in the country music field, including a station on FM; KZLA-FM (93.9) and KZLA (1540 AM) switched to country, followed in December 1980 by KHJ. (KHJ would return to oldies on April 1, 1983.) KZLA-AM-FM and KLAC competed through the 1980s. During this time, KLAC DJ Harry Newman could also be heard as the image voice for KCOP-TV, its former TV sister station. (KCOP later became a sister station to KTTV.)

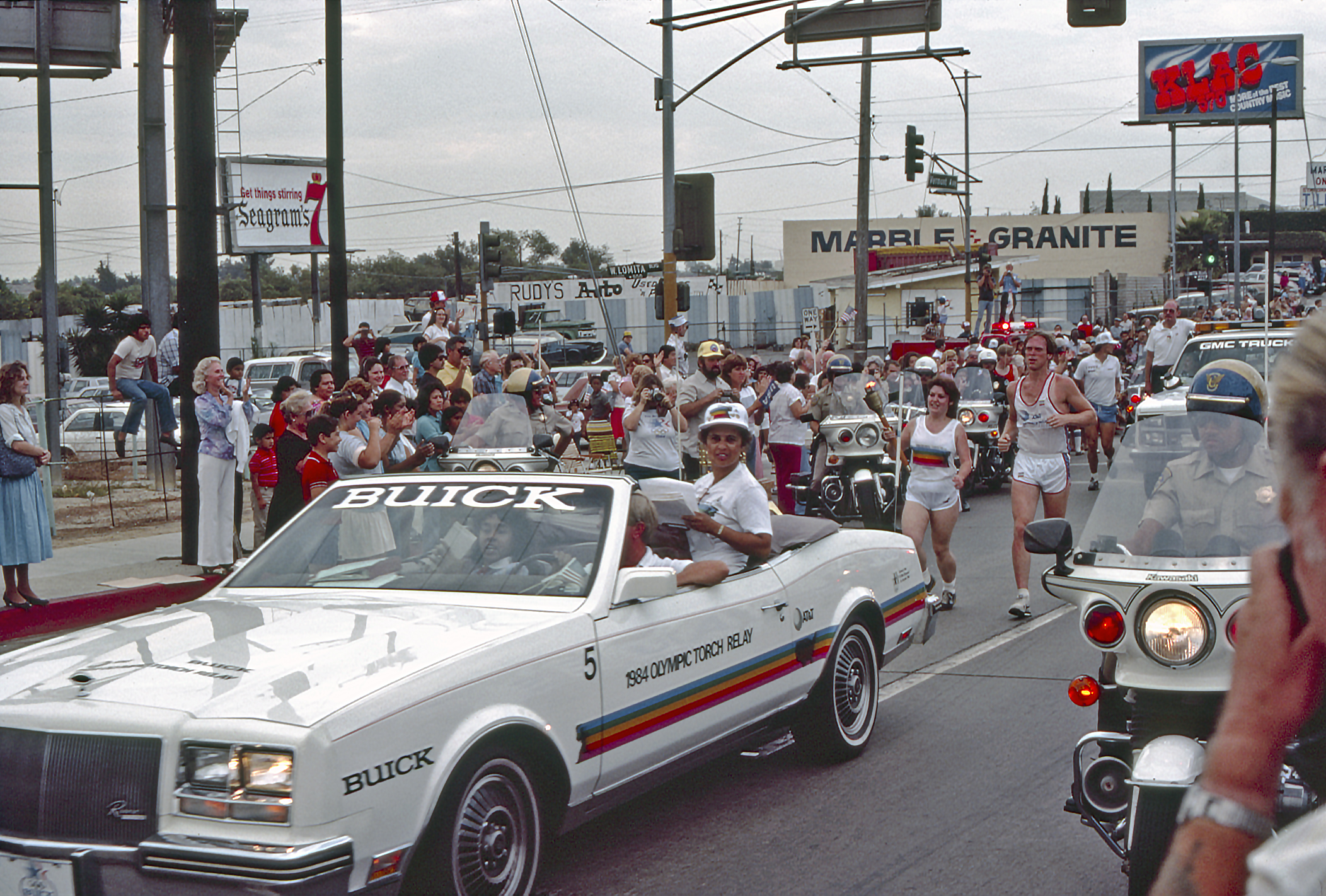
In this July 1984 photo, an advertisement poster of KLAC can be seen in the background during the 1984 Summer Olympics torch relay.

=== Capital Cities and Malrite ===
In 1984, Metromedia sold KLAC to Capital Cities Communications, which subsequently sold its previous Los Angeles AM station, KZLA (1540 AM) to Spanish Broadcasting System. One year later, Capital Cities announced its acquisition of ABC; the newly-merged company opted to retain KABC and KLOS, with both KLAC and KZLA-FM being sold to Malrite Communications. KLAC moved to classic country, playing country and western hits from the 1950s to the 1970s. One exception to the music format was a "combat talk" show hosted by Orange County conservative icon Wally George, on Monday nights during the late 1980s and early 1990s.

In late 1993, KLAC fired all its DJs and newscasters, including 31-year veteran Dean Sander, and dropped country for Westwood One's satellite-fed adult standards service, known as "AM Only". It played Frank Sinatra, Barbra Streisand, Nat King Cole, Neil Diamond, Peggy Lee, Petula Clark, Dean Martin, Johnny Mathis, The Carpenters, Elvis Presley, the Ames Brothers, Tony Bennett, Perry Como, Dionne Warwick and Barry Manilow. The station concentrated on vocalists from the 1960s and 1970s, with big band music no longer played. KLAC stayed with this format in some form until 2001.

=== Clear Channel ownership ===
KLAC was owned by Malrite until 1993, when the station was sold to Shamrock Communications in a group deal along with KZLA. In 1995, Shamrock's stations were absorbed by Chancellor Media and KZLA was swapped to Bonneville International in the late 1990s. Chancellor Media became AMFM Inc. when it merged with Capstar in 1999. In 2000, AMFM Inc. merged with Clear Channel Communications. In 2014, Clear Channel changed its name to iHeartMedia, KLAC's current co-owner. In 2001, KLAC became a talk radio station, airing syndicated programs from Don Imus, Clark Howard, Dr. Dean Edell, The Truckin' Bozo show, and local host Michael Jackson.

On September 12, 2002, KLAC returned to an adult standards format, becoming the "Fabulous 570". In addition to many of the station's previous standards artists, the playlist also included Norah Jones, Diana Krall, Harry Connick Jr., Rod Stewart and Michael Bublé, contemporary artists whose music is influenced by the Big Band Era. During the standards/lounge music period, Brad "Martini" Chambers, Jim "Swingin' Jimmy D" Duncan, Daisy Torme (Mel Torme's daughter) and LA radio and TV veteran Gary Owens were among the air talent.

=== XTRA Sports 570 ===
On February 4, 2005, Clear Channel Communications conducted a format swap on three of their radio stations in Southern California, including KLAC. KLAC switched formats to sports radio as "XTRA Sports 570"; with programming drawn from both XETRA (690 AM) and KXTA (1150 AM). Concurrently, XETRA changed format from sports radio to adult standards, re-branded as "The Fabulous 690"; and KXTA changed formats from sports radio to progressive talk as KTLK (1150 AM). All on- and off-air personnel were reassigned between the three stations; with KLAC retaining Steve Hartman, Lee Hamilton and Vic "The Brick" Jacobs from both XETRA and KXTA, along with the local rights to The Jim Rome Show. KLAC also initially marketed itself as serving both the Los Angeles and San Diego markets with the switch.

In February 2006, KLAC phased out the use of the XTRA Sports nickname as part of a re-orientation to the Los Angeles market, and was simply referred to on air as "AM 570". The XTRA Sports name was later re-launched in San Diego on KLSD on November 12, 2007, with Lee Hamilton starting local programming. For a brief time, "AM 570" placed less emphasis on sports and more emphasis on male-oriented talk to compete with KLSX, then the local home of Adam Carolla and Tom Leykis, and previously Howard Stern's L.A. station. Local hosts on KLAC were instructed to not limit themselves to sports, but also include celebrities, relationships, politics and current events. In addition, non-sports hosts Erich "Mancow" Muller and Phil Hendrie were added to the lineup.

The switch also meant that former afternoon host and one-time San Diego Chargers radio voice Lee "Hacksaw" Hamilton was moved to weekend duty. He also hosted a daily 5 p.m. sports update on KLAC for several months until landing a weekday show on San Diego–based KLSD. The KLAC call letters were initially only announced during station identification at the beginning of each hour, but would soon be used more often under the "AM 570 KLAC" brand, starting when the station celebrated its 30th anniversary as the Laker radio flagship. Some promotions spelled out the meaning of the call letters as "K-Los-Angeles-California".

Starting in late 2006, KLAC shifted its focus again to more sports content. Phil Hendrie voluntarily retired from his syndicated show to pursue an acting career (but would later revive the program on KTLK). Hendrie's time slot was filled by Joe McDonnell, who would last for two years at KLAC. Into The Night with Tony Bruno, which KLAC co-produced with The Content Factory, replaced McDonnell in September 2008.

Mancow was replaced with Roggin and Simers^{2}(Squared), hosted by KNBC sportscaster Fred Roggin, T.J. Simers of the Los Angeles Times, and Simers' daughter, Tracy Simers. Roggin and Simers^{2} lasted 11 months before being replaced in September 2007 by Dan Patrick's syndicated morning show, also produced by The Content Factory. Former USC Trojans football running back and former KMPC afternoon host Petros Papadakis joined KLAC in January 2007, teaming up with sportscaster Matt "Money" Smith (then the host of the Lakers Radio Network's pregame, halftime, and postgame coverage) to host an afternoon drive program dubbed the Petros and Money Show.

On December 11, 2008, the Los Angeles Lakers announced that KLAC would no longer be the team's flagship station following the 2008–2009 season, with Laker games moving to KSPN, ESPN Radio's Los Angeles station. On September 23, 2011, the Los Angeles Dodgers announced that KLAC would become the flagship for the team's radio network beginning in the 2012 season.

=== Fox Sports Radio ===
On January 20, 2009, the station announced a "merger" between KLAC and Fox Sports Radio. Many of the network shows would be based at KLAC, with the end of most local programming. General manager Don Martin was named KLAC's program director, and also became the network's program director, replacing Andrew Ashwood, who died a few months earlier. Some programs would be based at the Clear Channel studios in Burbank and some would be based at the Fox Sports Radio network offices in Sherman Oaks, which also housed the Premiere Networks' studios for Jim Rome. According to a report by Los Angeles Daily News media columnist Tom Hoffarth, Fox Sports Radio hosts Ben Maller, Andrew Siciliano, Krystal Fernandez, Craig Shemon and James Washington were released from their duties.

Shemon and Washington's morning slot was replaced by Dan Patrick, while Chris Myers' FSR show and Hartman's KLAC show were combined into Myers and Hartman; Myers effectively replaced Mychal Thompson (who was expected to leave the station at the end of the Laker season), and Vic "The Brick" Jacobs was reassigned to delivering brief sports updates. Siciliano and Fernandez's early evening show was replaced by Petros and Money, who would be carried on Fox Sports Radio between 2009 and 2014. KLAC initially dropped Into The Night with Tony Bruno to clear JT The Brick's existing FSR show, while Ben Maller's overnight show, The Third Shift, was canceled and replaced by a clip show entitled Fox Sports Soup. JT The Brick's show replaced Fox Sports Soup later in the year as the network assumed production of Into The Night and rehired Maller for weekend duty.

Myers left "Myers and Hartman" in March 2010 to focus on his other duties with Fox Sports, replaced by Pat O'Brien as co-host of the resurrected Loose Cannons, alongside Hartman and Jacobs.

=== Dodgers co-ownership ===
In September 2014, the Dodgers announced the team would buy an equity stake in KLAC, co-owning the station with iHeartMedia. The Dodgers wanted to be the principal sports franchise carried on the station, with advertising imaged around the team. Dodgers President Stan Kasten said, "We will be teaming up with the fantastic creative team at iHeartMedia on a number of projects and initiatives, to enhance our fans engagement."

On March 15, 2015, KLAC announced that it would drop its branding connected with Fox Sports Radio, changing to "AM 570 LA Sports", with a greater emphasis on Dodgers coverage, including a weeknight "Dodgers Talk" show all year round. The "LA" in KLAC's logo is derived from the Dodgers' cap insignia. Nevertheless, KLAC continued to carry some of the Fox Sports lineup such as Dan Patrick's morning show and Colin Cowherd's midmorning show. The change in ownership was consummated on August 5, 2016.

KLAC took over as the flagship station of the Los Angeles Clippers on March 16, 2016, following previous flagship KFWB's sale and conversion to foreign-language programming mid-season. In case of a scheduling conflict with the Dodgers, the Clippers would be heard on KEIB.

In 2017, KLAC and its sister station KFI acquired the rights to the Los Angeles Chargers. The play by play would air on KFI, with team shows and special programming on KLAC. In 2020, Chargers play-by-play would move to KYSR, also a KLAC sister station; KLAC would simulcast select games and continue to feature the Chargers during its programming.

During the baseball playoffs in October, if the Dodgers are in the playoffs, Patrick's show is preempted locally to air Sax and Cates in the Morning, hosted by Tim Cates and former Dodger Steve Sax until the Dodgers are eliminated from the playoffs or win the World Series.

== Sports play by play ==
- Current:
  - Los Angeles Dodgers (Since 2012)
  - Los Angeles Clippers (1984–1987; Since 2015)
  - Los Angeles Chargers (talk shows and special programming, with the games heard on KFI
  - NFL on Westwood One
- Former:
  - Los Angeles Lakers (1977–2009; last game was an NBA Finals win over the Orlando Magic)
  - Anaheim Angels (1999–2002, last game was a win over the San Francisco Giants to capture the World Series)
  - Los Angeles Raiders (1982–1994)
  - Los Angeles Avengers (2005–2008)
  - Los Angeles Sparks (2002–2005)
  - Los Angeles Express (1983–1984)
  - UCLA Bruins football (2004–2024)
  - UCLA Bruins men's basketball (2005–2025)
