= KTPI-FM =

Coordinates: 34.979°N 118.168°W

- Mojave, California; United States
- Broadcast area: Lancaster—Palmdale, California
- Frequency: 97.7 MHz
- Branding: 97-7 KTPI

Programming
- Format: Country
- Affiliations: Premiere Networks

Ownership
- Owner: RZ Radio LLC
- Sister stations: KTPI

History
- First air date: August 1, 1967
- Former call signs: KDOL-FM (1967–1985); KAVS (1985–1990); KHXT (1990); KAVS (1990–2000); KVVS (2000–2007); KOSS (2007–2008)
- Call sign meaning: Tehachapi

Technical information
- Licensing authority: FCC
- Facility ID: 2320
- Class: A
- ERP: 3,000 watts
- HAAT: 91 meters (299 ft)

Links
- Public license information: Public file; LMS
- Website: www.ktpifm.com

KTPI-FM (97.7 FM, "97-7 KTPI") is a commercial radio station licensed to Mojave, California, United States, and serving the Antelope Valley region of Southern California. It is owned by RZ Radio LLC and broadcasts a country music format.

The transmitter is off Prospect Road at 20th Street in Mojave. The studios are on East Avenue K-4 at 6th Street East in Lancaster.

== History ==
=== Early years (1967–1998) ===
The station signed on the air on August 1, 1967. The original call sign was KDOL-FM and the studios were in Mojave. It aired a country music format as a simulcast of AM sister station KDOL. In 1984, the simulcast ended and 97.7 FM began operating an automated Top 40 format branded "Hot 97".

In July 1985, Chambers Broadcasting purchased KDOL-AM-FM for $475,000. Chambers also owned KTPI (103.1 FM); the Federal Communications Commission (FCC) at the time limited radio station ownership to one AM and one FM station per market, so KDOL-FM was spun off to Antelope Broadcasting, which owned KAVL. Antelope retained the top 40 format but changed the call letters to KAVS.

KAVS flipped to modern rock in September 1995. In February 1997, KAVS began simulcasting with KYHT (105.3 FM) in Yermo and both stations broadcast as "High Desert Modern Rock 97.7 & 105.3".

=== Jacor/Clear Channel era (1998–2011) ===
In September 1998, Antelope Broadcasting sold its three stations — KAVS, KTPI, and KYHT — to Jacor Communications for $4 million. Jacor would be purchased by Clear Channel Communications the following year. KAVS and KYHT dropped their modern rock programming and began simulcasting the top 40 format of Clear Channel sister station KIIS-FM in Los Angeles. In the early days of Jacor/Clear Channel ownership, KAVS hosted many on-air events in the Antelope Valley and Barstow/Victor Valley areas.

Following the Jacor-Clear Channel merger, the new owners made drastic changes that produced a ripple effect across Southern California radio. The KAVS/KYHT simulcast was discontinued, and the latter's operations were transferred to Clear Channel's Victorville office. KYHT continued with the KIIS-FM format for two years, after which it began simulcasting KZXY-FM (Y102) in Victorville. KFMS in Las Vegas dropped its KIIS-FM simulcast and "KISS-FM" branding, introducing all-local programming and eventually changing formats altogether. Meanwhile, KAVS changed its call sign to KVVS in August 2000. Under Clear Channel ownership, the station gradually reduced its local airstaff and community activity. Eventually, the station dropped all local content except advertisements and simulcast KIIS-FM full-time.

On December 21, 2007, the KVVS call letters and the simulcast of KIIS-FM were moved to 105.5 FM; that station was previously known as KOSS, "105.5 The Oasis". The KOSS call letters relocated to 97.7 FM, as did the country format from KTPI-FM 103.1; that frequency then began simulcasting KYSR (Star 98.7) in Los Angeles. While the format of 97.7 FM was branded as "97-7 KTPI", the KTPI-FM call sign remained at 103.1 FM in Tehachapi temporarily. On January 2, 2008, KOSS and KTPI-FM swapped call signs, with 97.7 FM now becoming KTPI-FM. The station at 103.1 FM took on the KOSS call letters briefly, changing to KSRY on January 10, 2008.

=== RZ Radio era (2011–present) ===
As a condition of approving a plan by Clear Channel to become a privately held corporation, the FCC required the company to divest 194 stations in markets where it exceeded ownership limits by placing them into a trust until they were sold. In January 2008, Clear Channel transferred KTPI-FM and sports radio outlet KAVL to the Aloha Station Trust. In December 2011, RZ Media LLC, owned by Saul Rosenzweig, purchased KTPI-FM and KAVL from the trust, and KTPI (AM) from Clear Channel directly, for a total of $800,000.

Weekday programming on KTPI-FM includes Big D and Bubba (syndicated from Nashville) in mornings. Justin Michael is in the weekday midday timeslot, which features "The 90s At Noon", a full hour of 1990s country. Program Director Shannon Smith is on-air during afternoon drive time, followed by the syndicated shows Big Time with Whitney Allen Monday—Saturday evenings and CMT After Midnite with Granger Smith overnight. Weekends feature The Crook and Chase Countdown and Ramblin' Ray.
