= KTPI (AM) =

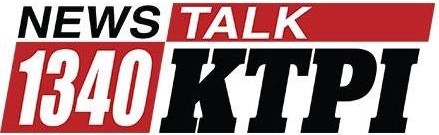
- Mojave, California; United States
- Broadcast area: Lancaster-Palmdale
- Frequency: 1340 kHz
- Branding: News Talk 1340 AM KTPI

Programming
- Format: Talk radio
- Affiliations: Lancaster JetHawks

Ownership
- Owner: High Desert Broadcasting LLC; (RZ Radio LLC)
- Sister stations: KTPI-FM

History
- First air date: May 1, 1961
- Former call signs: KDOL (1961–1987); KVOY (1987–1998); KAVC (1998–2002)
- Call sign meaning: Tehachapi

Technical information
- Licensing authority: FCC
- Facility ID: 66229
- Class: C
- Power: 1,000 watts
- Transmitter coordinates: 35°02′22.9″N 118°9′0.3″W
- Translator: 97.3 K247CN (Mojave)

Links
- Public license information: Public file; LMS
- Website: www.ktpi1340.com

KTPI (1340 AM, "News Talk 1340 KTPI") is a commercial radio station licensed to Mojave, California, United States, and serves the Antelope Valley area. The station is owned by RZ Radio LLC and airs a talk format. KTPI is the radio home of the Lancaster JetHawks, a Minor League Baseball team in the California League.

== History ==
=== KDOL ===
The station first signed on May 1, 1961, as KDOL with a country music format. In the late 1970s, KDOL enjoyed its greatest success led by zany morning disc jockey "Country" Tom Fielding and afternoon DJ Gene "The King Of Mobile Disco" Pro. The station played top 40 and oldies with its own version of automatic formatting in the early 1980s.

In July 1985, Chambers Broadcasting purchased KDOL and its FM sister station KDOL-FM for $475,000. As Chambers also owned KTPI (then on 103.1 FM), and the Federal Communications Commission (FCC) at the time limited radio station ownership to one AM and one FM station per market, KDOL-FM was spun off to Antelope Broadcasting, which owned KAVL. The following year, KDOL adopted a gold-based adult contemporary music format.

=== KVOY/KAVC ===
In February 1987, Chambers sold KDOL and KTPI to HPW Communications Inc. for $2.5 million. On July 15, the station changed its call sign to KVOY and restored the previous country format.

In December 1991, HPW sold KVOY and KTPI to Park Lane Group Inc. for $1.7 million.

On December 11, 1998, KVOY adopted the KAVC call letters and the Christian talk format that previously were on 105.5 FM; that station became KOSS (now KVVS).

In April 2000, Clear Channel Communications proposed a complex station swap with Regent Communications which would have involved 20 stations nationwide, including KAVC, and a payment of over $67 million by Regent to Clear Channel. This deal was one of many divestitures required of Clear Channel and AMFM, Inc. by the FCC as a condition of their merger, in order to satisfy ownership caps in each affected media market. However, this exchange did not take place. Instead, in November, Regent sold KAVC, KOSS, and KTPI to Odessa, Florida-based Concord Media Group for $13.5 million.

=== KTPI ===
On December 1, 2002, the station changed its call sign to KTPI and flipped to an automated classic country format as "1340 KTPI AM" to complement the contemporary country content of sister station KTPI-FM. In early 2003, the station rebranded as "Community Radio 1340" as it added a morning program that discussed local politics and events while retaining classic country the rest of the time.

In October 2003, Clear Channel Communications purchased KTPI-AM-FM and KOSS from Concord Media Group for $13.6 million. In mid-2004, sister station KWJL (1380 AM) in Lancaster, California dropped its adult standards format in favor of Mexican oldies, after which KTPI took on the old name and format and became "K-Jewel 1340" for a brief time. A few months later, the station rebranded as "Magic 1340" but kept adult standards. On May 21, 2004, at midnight, KTPI flipped to a news/talk format.

In 2007, publicly traded Clear Channel announced it was becoming a privately held corporation. As a condition of its approval of the plan, the FCC required the company to divest 194 stations in markets where it exceeded ownership limits by placing them into a trust until they are sold. In January 2008, Clear Channel transferred two stations in its Antelope Valley cluster, KAVL and KTPI-FM, to the Aloha Station Trust; the company retained KTPI (AM). In December 2011, RZ Media LLC, owned by Saul Rosenzweig, purchased KTPI-FM and KAVL from the trust, and KTPI from Clear Channel directly, for a total of $800,000.
