= KEIB =

Radio station in Los Angeles

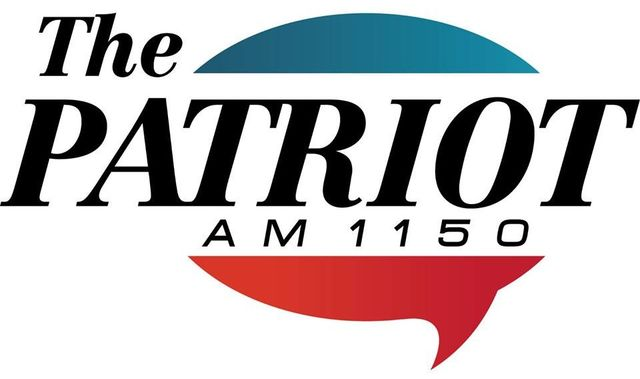
- Los Angeles, California; United States
- Broadcast area: Greater Los Angeles
- Frequency: 1150 kHz
- Branding: The Patriot AM 1150

Programming
- Format: Conservative talk
- Affiliations: Fox News Radio; Premiere Networks

Ownership
- Owner: iHeartMedia, Inc.; (iHM Licenses, LLC)
- Sister stations: KBIG; KFI; KIIS-FM; KLAC; KOST; KRRL; KSRY; KVVS; KYSR

History
- First air date: January 1927
- Former call signs: KMIC (1927–1930); KMCS (1930–1932); KRKD (1932–1970); KIIS (1970–1980); KPRZ (1980–1984); KUSA (1984); KPRZ (1984); KIIS (1984–1997); KXTA (1997–2005); KTLK (2005–2014)
- Call sign meaning: "Excellence in Broadcasting" (slogan of The Rush Limbaugh Show)

Technical information
- Licensing authority: FCC
- Facility ID: 19219
- Class: B (regional)
- Power: 50,000 watts (day); 44,000 watts (night)
- Transmitter coordinates: 34°2′0″N 117°59′3.2″W

Links
- Public license information: Public file; LMS
- Webcast: Listen live (via iHeartRadio)
- Website: patriotla.iheart.com

KEIB (1150 AM) is a commercial radio station in Los Angeles, California. Owned by iHeartMedia, the station brands itself as The Patriot, and broadcasts a conservative talk radio format. The station's studios are on West Olive Avenue in Burbank.

By day, KEIB is powered at 50,000 watts, the maximum for commercial AM stations in the U.S. At night, to minimize interference to other stations on 1150 AM, it reduces power to 44,000 watts. The station's transmitter uses a directional antenna with a four-tower array, located in the City of Industry.

== Programming ==
The weekday schedule on "The Patriot" features all nationally syndicated talk programs: The Sean Hannity Show, The Glenn Beck Program, The Ramsey Show with Dave Ramsey, The Clay Travis and Buck Sexton Show, Our American Stories with Lee Habeeb, The Jesse Kelly Show and The Michael Berry Show.

The station carries Los Angeles Clippers and Anaheim Ducks games in case of conflicts with their regular radio stations. Weekends feature repeats of weekday shows and two local hosts: Mark Moss and Joe Escalante, along with syndicated programs The Weekend with Michael Brown and The Jesus Christ Show with Neil Saavedra. On weekends, some hours are paid brokered programming. Most hours begin with an update from Fox News Radio.

== History ==
=== Early years ===
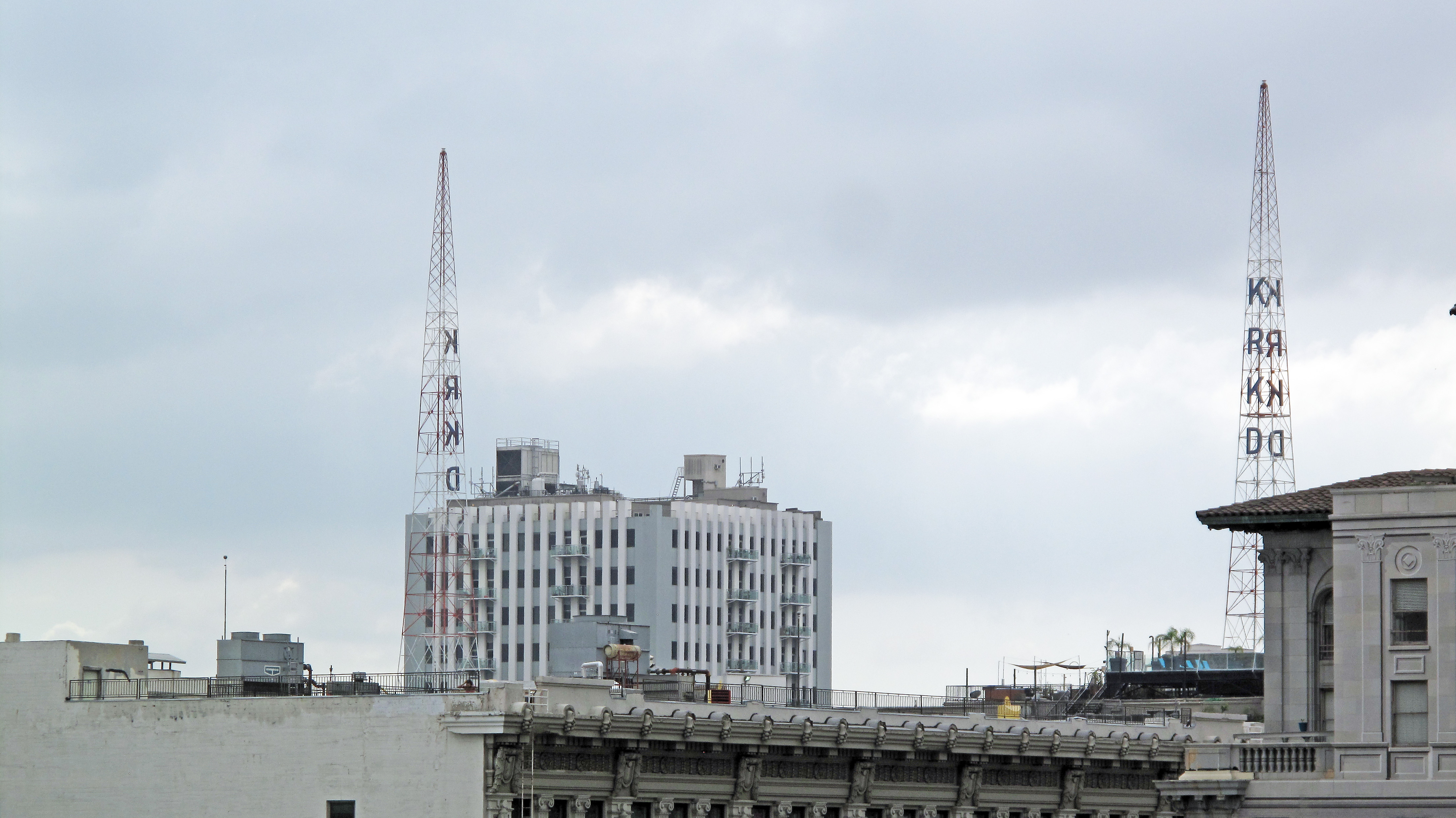
KRKD radio towers, downtown Los Angeles

KEIB is one of the oldest stations in Southern California. It originally signed on as KMIC, licensed to Inglewood, in January 1927. The call sign changed to KMCS in 1930. In 1932, new owners moved the station to the Spring Arcade Building at 541 S. Spring Street in Los Angeles, and adopted what would be its longest-lived callsign, KRKD, a reference to the word "arcade". Two broadcast towers on the roof, with "a long-wire flattop transmitting antenna", had the KRKD letters on the side.

From 1928 until its deletion in 1961, KFSG 1150 (1120 before 1941) shared the KRKD frequency and transmitter. The International Church of the Foursquare Gospel bought KRKD to keep from having to share time, airing mostly secular programming. From 6 p.m. to midnight, KRKD aired services from Angelus Temple.

KRKD-FM aired the same programming as the AM station before 1966. After that, the two stations aired the same adult standards programming after 2 in the afternoon and were known as "Your Album Stations of Southern California". On its own KRKD-FM aired theatrical performances, light classical music and opera. At one point, the AM aired college football while the FM kept the album format, and when the games ended, the AM continued the album format and the FM aired theater and opera.

=== KIIS ===
The Foursquare Church sold KRKD AM in 1970 (and changed KRKD-FM to KFSG). In 1970, the KRKD call letters were then changed to KIIS to identify it with its AM frequency (1150=IIS). The new owners changed the format to soft rock with jingles created by PAMS of Dallas, some of which were in the style of Richard and Karen Carpenter. It was known as "the Kiss of California". In 1975, its owners, Combined Communications, "married" KIIS 1150 AM to their FM station, KKDJ 102.7 FM, in an on-air wedding on Charlie Tuna's KKDJ morning show. KKDJ then became known as KIIS-FM. The AM and FM stations ("AM and FM, K-Double I S") did simulcasts during the day and reverted to two stations in the evening hours (with this, the AM aired their own version of the jingle package which had been produced for its sister FM station). The combined stations had many popular jocks including Humble Harve, Jay Stevens, Charlie Tuna from KKDJ.

=== KPRZ ===
In late 1979, as KIIS-FM went to an all-disco format, KIIS AM briefly changed its format to religious talk and the station became Christian radio KPRZ ("K-Praise"). KPRZ implemented C-QUAM AM stereo during this time. And then switched to the Motorola system.

But soon thereafter, KMPC unexpectedly dropped its adult standards format and fired its DJs. Dick Whittinghill, Gary Owens, Johnny Magnus and Pete Smith all moved over to KPRZ, which took over the KMPC music and called it "The Music of Your Life". Whttinghill would complain about "all that noise down the hall at sister station KIIS-FM". If the door to the KPRZ studios was open, the Top 40 music on KIIS-FM could even be heard in the background on the AM station.

=== KIIS ===
KMPC returned to standards a few years later, which hurt KPRZ. The station ended its standards format on New Year's Eve 1984, and became KIIS AM again. KIIS carried a virtual simulcast of KIIS-FM's programming, although with different DJs during middays and afternoons and programming being delayed by up to 3 minutes, to avoid FCC restrictions on simulcasting. Around 1988, this would transition to a full-time simulcast when the FCC relaxed the rules on major market stations simulcasting each other.

=== KXTA ===
On March 10, 1997, KIIS became sports radio KXTA, the flagship station of the Los Angeles Dodgers.The KIIS call letters would later resurface in Santa Clarita in 1998, with another simulcast of KIIS-FM (that station is now known as KHTS, having changed its call letters in 2003).

XTRA Sports 1150 flipped to Fox Sports 1150 for a time.

In 2003, KXTA, by this time a Clear Channel Communications station, was falling off in the ratings and had lost the Dodgers to KFWB. KXTA flipped back to XTRA Sports, this time on both 1150 AM and 690 AM, the successful XTRA in San Diego.

=== KTLK ===
On February 4, 2005, Clear Channel conducted a far-reaching format swap of three radio stations in the area. The XTRA Sports format moved to AM 570, where it retains its call letters of KLAC. It had the slogan XTRA Sports 570, but later rebranded to AM 570. AM 690 took on KLAC's previous format, an adult standards station called The Fabulous 570 and redubbed The Fabulous 690. AM 1150, meanwhile, would adopt a progressive talk format as KTLK.

On February 4, 2008, KTLK altered several of its time slots. Marc Germain, also known as "Mr. K", was removed from the lineup and replaced by Rachel Maddow from 3 to 6 p.m. Mike Malloy's show was returned to the station. Finally, Phil Hendrie's show was returned to the lineup, from 10 p.m. to 1 a.m. Ed Schultz was dropped. The station removed its award-winning and popular weeknight show "Harrison on the Edge", hosted by Cary Harrison and produced by Linda Blake on February 27, 2007, after an 18-month run.

KTLK's previous logo used until early 2014.

During this time nationally syndicated hosts were Stephanie Miller who was also simulcast on Current TV from 2012 to 2013 from the KTLK studios, Randi Rhodes, Norman Goldman, Clark Howard, Mike Malloy, Phil Hendrie, and Bill Press. Miller is distributed by Dial Global, Rhodes, Howard, and Hendrie by Premiere Radio Networks (which had the same parent company as the station), Goldman by Compass Media Networks, and Malloy is self-syndicated.

Two local shows were in the weekday lineup: Diverse L.A., which promotes itself on the station's webpage as follows: "We as Angelenos don't look, think or even vote alike...so why should we sound alike?", and an afternoon drivetime show hosted by David Cruz.

Former programs include those of Ron Reagan, Sam Seder and Janeane Garofalo's "Majority Report", and Lionel, who all left the schedule when Air America Media folded. Other past offerings were local Cary Harrison and national show Thom Hartmann, who was picked up after comedian Al Franken ended his early 9 a.m.-noon show over Air America to prepare for his eventual successful run for the U.S. Senate from Minnesota. In turn, Hartmann was taken off the schedule when Dial Global moved his show to the exact noon-3 p.m. time slot as Rhodes' show.

On weekends, the station featured local hosts including Johnny Wendell (a.k.a. Johnny Angel), the comedy duo Frangela of Angela V. Shelton and Frances Callier, and Mario Solis-Marich. The syndicated StarTalk Radio Show hosted by Dr. Neil deGrasse Tyson aired on Sunday afternoons.

In these years of Air America affiliation and, later, as an independent station, KTLK used in turn the promo slogans "L.A.'s Progressive Talk," "The Voice of Reason" and finally "Your Voice". Another line heard often in station IDs that referenced the station hosts' political take was "From Minority to Majority".

On January 8, 2014, KTLK changed call letters to KEIB and became "The Patriot", converting from progressive-leaning format to one that emphasizes a conservative viewpoint.

Randi Rhodes had already planned a transition to an online-only show and encouraged her fans to continue listening by downloading the iHeartRadio application for their smart phones and tablet computers. However, only months after the launch of her online model, Rhodes announced that she was ending her show, citing her frustration with the media in general.

=== KEIB ===
On January 2, 2014, KEIB began airing a conservative talk format, branded as "The Patriot", featuring Rush Limbaugh, Glenn Beck, and Sean Hannity, all three of whom are nationally distributed through iHeartMedia's syndication arm, Premiere Networks. Aside from the change in the station's programming viewpoint (from progressive to conservative), the programming move ensured continued clearance in Los Angeles of 3 of Premiere's most popular programs — The Glenn Beck Program, The Rush Limbaugh Show, and The Sean Hannity Show. In particular, Hannity was picked up from KABC after that station's owner, Cumulus Media, purged Hannity from its talk-formatted stations on or before the end of 2013. The move also allowed for a split in programming nature among iHeartMedia's LA talk stations, as KFI (Limbaugh's former home) began adopting an emphasis on local hosts and subjects. The station aired The Rush Limbaugh Show at the time of Limbaugh's death in 2021, and it currently airs The Clay Travis and Buck Sexton Show, Premiere's designated replacement for Limbaugh's program.

With the launch of "The Patriot" on AM 1150, a new call sign was assigned to the station, with KTLK becoming KEIB, a play on Limbaugh's "Excellence in Broadcasting" slogan. iHeartMedia applied for the KEIB call letters to ease the move of his show in the LA market from its longtime home at higher-rated KFI to become a magnet for the new 1150. The KTLK call letters in turn moved to iHeartMedia-owned KTCN (AM 1130) in the Minneapolis/St. Paul market; KTCN's programming (which includes Limbaugh and Hannity) had been previously heard on KTLK-FM (100.3 FM), which became the sports oriented KFXN-FM in August 2011 when the stations swapped programming. (The KTLK calls, until 2002, were assigned to what is now KDFD in Denver, an iHeartMedia-owned progressive talk station. Before that, the calls were applied to another Denver station, which was one of the first full-time talk stations in the nation; that station is currently the Regional Mexican music station KBNO.) On October 15, 2015, Armstrong & Getty announced on-air that their 'Voice of the West' morning drive time show would be joining the KEIB line-up on November 2, 2015; the duo replaced The Glenn Beck Program. Armstrong & Getty moved their show to KABC in 2019.

On March 16, 2016, it was announced that sister station KLAC would be the new flagship for the Los Angeles Clippers. In case of a scheduling conflict with the Los Angeles Dodgers (also on KLAC), the Clippers would be heard on KEIB.

=== Sports ===
The station was the flagship outlet of the Los Angeles Kings of the National Hockey League and the Los Angeles Galaxy of Major League Soccer until 2014. Currently, the station airs games of the UCLA Bruins, and Anaheim Ducks, in case of conflicts with their regular radio stations. It has also aired National Football League games from Westwood One. During the KTLK era the station was the former radio home of the Los Angeles Clippers (traded to KSPN in exchange for Kings' rights, now on KLAC), the Los Angeles Sparks (contract not renewed after 2008), and the Los Angeles Avengers (team folded in 2009). The Kings returned to KEIB for one season, and since 2019, the team has no terrestrial radio flagship station, as its games are now exclusively streamed on the iHeartRadio network.

On April 2, 2012, the station broadcast the NCAA men's basketball championship game in which Kentucky defeated Kansas. The tourney had been carried locally on KLAC, but that station had a programming conflict due to also being the flagship radio station of the Los Angeles Dodgers that season. As a result, KLAC's coverage of the Dodgers' spring training game against the Los Angeles Angels of Anaheim preempted their broadcast of the Wildcats-Jayhawks game which was then accommodated on KTLK.
