= KVVS =

Radio station in Rosamond, California

Simulcast of KIIS-FM, Los Angeles
- Rosamond, California; United States
- Broadcast area: Lancaster-Palmdale, California
- Frequency: 105.5 MHz
- Branding: 102.7 KIIS FM

Programming
- Format: Contemporary hit radio
- Affiliations: Premiere Networks

Ownership
- Owner: iHeartMedia, Inc.; (iHM Licenses, LLC)
- Sister stations: KBIG; KEIB; KFI; KIIS-FM; KLAC; KOST; KRRL; KSRY; KYSR

History
- First air date: 1988
- Former call signs: KCRP (1983–1985); KAVC (1985–1998); KOSS (1998–2007)
- Call sign meaning: Derived from KIIS

Technical information
- Licensing authority: FCC
- Facility ID: 49950
- Class: A
- ERP: 6,000 watts
- HAAT: 94 meters (308 ft)
- Transmitter coordinates: 34°51′3″N 118°9′22″W

Links
- Public license information: Public file; LMS
- Webcast: Listen live (via iHeartRadio)
- Website: kiisfm.iheart.com

KVVS (105.5 MHz) is a commercial FM radio station licensed to Rosamond, California, United States, and owned by iHeartMedia, Inc. It simulcasts the Top 40 (CHR) format of KIIS-FM from Los Angeles for listeners in northern Los Angeles County and southeastern Kern County, California, collectively known as the Antelope Valley region. Educational Media Foundation-owned KTLW, which serves the same role as KVVS as an Antelope Valley re-broadcaster of KKLQ-HD2, also transmits from the KVVS tower.

KVVS originates no local programming of its own, and simulcasts KIIS-FM full-time. Outside of an automated station identification played hourly only on the 105.5 signal, there is no other acknowledgement of KVVS itself on KIIS-FM, or on any of its web and social media presences.

== History ==
The station signed on in 1988 as a Christian talk and teaching station known as KAVC. The format lasted until 1998, when its format and intellectual property shifted to 1340 AM in Mojave after 105.5 was purchased by Clear Channel Communications. The station became KOSS with an adult contemporary format as 105.5 The Oasis. It leaned towards hot adult contemporary in later years.

In December 2007, the station's air staff was dismissed. The KIIS-FM simulcast in the Antelope Valley originated in the early 2000s on 97.7 FM, also in Mohave and then called KVVS-FM. It was shifted to the higher-power signal of 105.5 at that time, with the call letters soon following over. Several other call letter changes among Clear Channel's Antelope Valley cluster of stations also occurred at the same time.
