= KHTS (AM) =

Coordinates: 34.4653°N 118.4029°W

- Santa Clarita, California; United States
- Frequency: 1220 kHz
- Branding: KHTS FM 98.1 & AM 1220

Programming
- Format: Full service
- Affiliations: Fox News Radio; Radio America; Salem Radio Network; Westwood One; Los Angeles Dodgers Radio Network

Ownership
- Owner: Jeri Lyn Broadcasting, Inc.

History
- First air date: June 1989
- Former call signs: KBET (1988–1999); KIIS (1999–2003)
- Call sign meaning: Your HomeTown Station

Technical information
- Licensing authority: FCC
- Facility ID: 58521
- Class: B
- Power: 1,000 watts day 500 watts night
- Translator: 98.1 K251CF (Santa Clarita)

Links
- Public license information: Public file; LMS
- Webcast: Listen Live
- Website: hometownstation.com

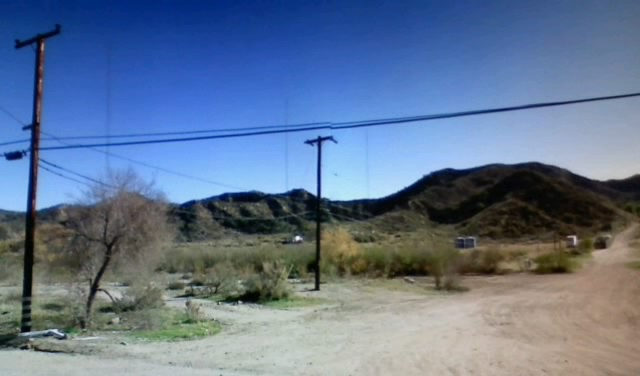
KHTS from Sierra Highway

KHTS (1220 kHz) is a commercial AM radio station that is licensed to the Canyon Country neighborhood of Santa Clarita, California, about 30 miles (48 km) north of Los Angeles. The station is owned by Jeri Lyn Broadcasting (formerly Saddleback Broadcasting). KHTS broadcasts with 1,000 watts during the daytime and 500 watts at night. The station is nicknamed "Your Hometown Station". KHTS is rebroadcast on FM translator K251CF (98.1 FM) in Santa Clarita.

KHTS is a full-service radio station, meaning it broadcasts a variety of locally oriented programming. A typical broadcast day consists of a combination of local talk shows and time-brokered programs. Local sports programs include play-by-play coverage of several high school football and basketball teams and the football program at the College of the Canyons. Coverage of professional sports includes the Los Angeles Dodgers, Los Angeles Kings, and NASCAR auto racing.

The station has won numerous awards over the years, including the Santa Clarita Valley Chamber of Commerce award for Small Business of the Year in 1995.

== History ==
=== Early years ===
The station at 1220 AM debuted in June 1989 with the call letters KBET and was branded as "The Beat of Santa Clarita". It was founded by a local television engineer, Larry Bloomfield. Bloomfield, along with his certified public accountant Howard "Scott" Howard and other investors, formed Canyon Broadcasters. The station's first chief engineer, Andrew Castiglione, signed on "KBET 1220 AM Stereo" on the air. Castiglione received the "Radio World Annual Magazine Award" in February 1990 for making KBET the world's first digital, tapeless, and paperless radio station.

After having difficulty turning KBET into a profitable enterprise, Canyon Broadcasters filed for bankruptcy in July 1990. Carl Goldman and Jeri Seratti Goldman took over operation of the station in November 1991; the sale closed the following month. They, along with several other investors, formed Saddleback Broadcasting, the parent company of KBET through 1998.

KBET was one of four stations to form the "Greater Los Angeles Bedroom Radio Network", a consortium of suburban Los Angeles radio stations with target audiences consisting of affluent older adults. Through the alliance, advertisers could purchase airtime on all four stations at discounted rates.

In January 1994, KBET became a vital emergency outlet for the Santa Clarita Valley in the aftermath of the Northridge earthquake. After the Newhall Pass interchange (junction Interstate 5 and State Route 14) collapsed, the Santa Clarita Valley was sealed off from Los Angeles. KBET provided around-the-clock news, traffic and emergency information for the many months of recovery. The station also provided psychological comfort to local residents; they could call in and express their feelings and concerns on the air and realise their fears were not unique or isolated. Needs for essential items such as diapers, portable heaters, and water were met instantly as appeals were broadcast over the KBET airwaves and listeners would respond with assistance. As a sense of normalcy returned to the Santa Clarita Valley and the Newhall Pass interchange reopened, KBET evolved from a news/talk format into a full-service radio station, blending in adult contemporary music with news, traffic, weather, and sports.

=== Jacor/Clear Channel era (1998–2003) ===
In September 1998, Saddleback Broadcasting sold KBET to Jacor Communications. Jacor was purchased by Clear Channel Communications before the sale was finalized. KBET flipped to full-time sports programming as "XTRA Sports 1220", simulcasting KAVL (610 AM) in Lancaster, California. Sharon Bronson, the station's sales manager under the Goldmans, became its general manager. Barry McKeever remained on board to continue to head up the station's local programming and sports.

In June 1999, XTRA Sports 1220 became "1220 KIIS", weaving in a mixture of local programming and simulcasts of KAVS (97.7 KIIS-FM) and KAVL (XTRA Sports 610). The call letters were changed to KIIS in August 1999; previously, they had belonged to a Los Angeles AM station which also simulcast the KIIS-FM (102.7 FM) signal in the mid-1980s.

In early 2001, Clear Channel closed the KIIS offices located at Sierra Highway and Soledad Canyon Road in Santa Clarita, moving the operation to the Antelope Valley as part of Clear Channel's Lancaster—Palmdale cluster of stations. The station had difficulty maintaining a local identity, despite opening a small studio on Bouquet Canyon Road in Saugus. Most of the station's programming was eliminated; most of its lineup consisted of the live sports coverage from KAVL, Rick Dees' morning show, and Rush Limbaugh's syndicated program. The rest of the time, the station was automated with an adult contemporary format playlist. Rick Dees Weekly Top 40 and Leeza Gibbons' Hollywood Confidential aired Sunday mornings. Despite the move, local programming did continue on KIIS, including the Santa Clarita Real Estate Show, Santa Clarita Golf Talk, God is God and We're Not hosted by local representatives of the Church of Jesus Christ of Latter-day Saints, and Music & Message with Ron Fisher.

KIIS briefly identified as "News/Talk 1220" starting in November 2001. It aired Rick Dees weekday mornings; the rest of the time, it featured shows hosted by Limbaugh, Glenn Beck, and Michael Reagan, as well as CNN Headline News coverage. During this time, they still carried sports game coverage from XTRA Sports 610.

In March 2002, KIIS decreased its power to 500 watts full-time and reverted to "1220 KIIS", this time as a full-time simulcast of KIIS-FM.

=== Jeri Lyn era (2003–present) ===
During the years Clear Channel operated 1220 AM, the Goldmans remained residents of Santa Clarita and committed to the SCV community. Sensing a need for a local radio station, the Goldmans approached Clear Channel to repurchase KIIS, obtaining it in October 2003 under their corporate name of Jeri Lyn Broadcasting for $900,000. The station went back to its original power (1,000 watts day, 500 watts night). Jeri Lyn wanted to use the original KBET call letters, but they were already being used at a station in Nevada. Eventually they chose a new call sign, KHTS, and opened new studios at Soledad Canyon Road and Camp Plenty in Canyon Country. The transmitter site and towers still remain at their original location on Sierra Highway, north of Vasquez Canyon in Canyon Country.

In June 2015, KHTS relocated to a new studio on Main Street in Newhall, occupying the former site of Newhall Hardware.

In February 2018, KHTS began rebroadcasting on FM translator K251CF at 98.1 MHz. The translator allows the station to reach a broader audience with a high-quality signal covering the entire Santa Clarita Valley.

As of 2018, KHTS is a full-service station combining news, traffic, sports, and adult contemporary music.

== In other media ==
In 2010, KHTS was featured on an episode of the Animal Planet reality show Pit Boss, where Shorty Rossi discusses with KHTS morning show host Brandon Gibson about pit bulls and to better educate the public about the breed.
