= Al Rantel =

American radio personality

- Born: Alfred Anthony Quarantello Jr. October 14, 1955 (age 70); United States
- Occupation: Radio show host

Alfred Anthony Quarantello Jr. (born October 14, 1955), better known by his professional name Al Rantel, is an American conservative talk show host. Rantel's most recent contract was with KABC radio, Los Angeles, California. He retired for medical reasons in June, 2009. He worked in Florida for many years prior to moving to KABC, and has appeared as a pundit on television news and discussion programs. Rantel received the opportunity to work in Los Angeles at radio station KABC due to the encouragement of another East Coast transplanted talk host, Tom Leykis. Rantel previously worked for Los Angeles station KNX and Florida stations WINZ, WNWS, and WFTL.

== Guests ==
Rantel frequently features guests on his program, coordinating a weekly simulcast with British Talksport host Mike Mendoza (despite the fact that Mendoza has compared homosexuality to pedophilia) and often conversing with conservative author Ann Coulter. When Coulter appears, she usually does so in the first segment of the evening program. Democratic strategist Bob Mulholland, Republican strategist Michael Wissot, public-relations guru Michael Levine, and columnists John Leboutillier, Gustavo Arellano and Bruce Bialosky often appear on the program; former California governors Jerry Brown, Gray Davis, and Pete Wilson have made occasional appearances. Despite the numerous appearances of conservatives such as Ann Coulter, the program often features guests with very different opinions than the host. In addition, many guests are authors or leaders of a particular organization.

On the morning program, Newsmax Media writers often appear to discuss various issues with Rantel. Prior to February 27, 2006, his evening show usually ended with a brief conversation with Mr. KABC; this tradition ended with the expanded syndication of Mark Levin on KABC and WABC.

During the 2003 California gubernatorial recall election, Rantel referred to then-Governor Gray Davis as "Governor Lowbeam." He has since not described Davis by that name; Rantel has also remarked that he respects Davis as a former statesman and values his commentary.

When Rantel was absent, Carol Platt Liebau, Rob Nelson or a KABC colleague hosted the program. Rantel, for his part, occasionally hosted The Larry Elder Show when Elder was absent.

== Health issues ==
On Jan 23, 2008, Larry Elder read a statement from Al Rantel on the air at 6:30 PM announcing to his listeners that he has been diagnosed with lymphoma and undergoing chemotherapy for it. Al's fill-in host Tammy Bruce also made the same announcement in her segment of the show. On May 27, 2008, Rantel returned to the air on KABC.

Rantel suffered another health emergency in August 2008 when he slipped and fell in the parking structure of his apartment building, necessitating hip and shoulder replacement. After yet another extended hiatus from the airways, on Wednesday, June 24, 2009, it was announced, Rantel would be retiring from KABC at his doctor's request. On Doug McIntyre's morning show, Al shared that he would be moving temporarily to Vancouver, Canada, to rest and recuperate.

== Other information ==
Rantel had supported College Republican groups by coordinating live broadcasts on college campuses in Southern California. He was formerly an Advisory Board member of the Bruin Alumni Association, resigning after expressing displeasure with the direction of the group.

On the night of the 2008 presidential election, Rantel announced that he had voted for Democrat Barack Obama, citing his anger with the Republican party and its nominee John McCain as the reason for doing so. Shortly after the announcement, fellow KABC talk show host Larry Elder has referred to Rantel as one half of the Marx Brothers, stating that he believed Rantel didn't believe in the conservative principles he professed and that by voting for Obama, he demonstrated more Marxist leanings.

== Controversy ==
During a discussion on US airport security on September 10, 2007, Rantel allegedly said that if his mother had to take her shoes off during a security screening, "... then why shouldn't a Sikh be required to take off the hat that looks like a diaper ...?" The alleged remark angered the Sikh community, which reportedly planned some public protests.
