= Terri-Rae Elmer =

- Born: 1956 (age 69–70); Brooklyn, Wisconsin, U.S.
- Occupation: Radio broadcaster.

Terri-Rae Elmer (born 1956) is an American radio personality. Elmer was a radio news announcer for KFI AM 640 from 1983 to 2011. Following KFI Terri-rae became the co-host of the morning show on KABC 790 with Doug McIntyre. Cumulus Media did not renew her contract for 2017 and she is no longer on KABC-790AM. She was born in Brooklyn, Wisconsin.

== Early career ==
Prior to joining KFI, Elmer served at KFBK in Sacramento, where her work was recognized by the California Farm Bureau Federation, which selected her as Agricultural Reporter of the Year in 1983, and by the Associated Press for Best Agricultural News Story in 1986.

== KFI (1983-2011) ==
From 1990 to 1993, Elmer and Tracey Miller co-hosted KFI's TNT in the Morning, the first morning-drive show in a major market to feature two women in the lead roles.

From 1993 until her departure from KFI in December 2011, Elmer handled news during KFI's afternoon "drive time" and participated with the hosts of The John and Ken Show to the extent that she was a virtual sidekick on that program, often breaking from her newsreader role and expressing points of view. During the 6pm hour of The John and Ken Show on December 7, 2011, John Kobylt announced Elmer was leaving KFI to pursue another opportunity.

== KABC (2012-2016) ==
On January 3, 2012, Elmer joined a new morning show on Los Angeles-based KABC 790AM with co-host Doug McIntyre. In late 2016, Elmer's contract was not renewed for 2017, ending her association with KABC.

== Awards ==
In 2006 Elmer shared the Associated Press's Bill Stout Award for Station Spot News with other members of the KFI news team for their coverage September 2005 Topanga fire.

In 2010 Elmer shared a nomination for the Associated Press's Best News Broadcast (less than 15 minutes). No winner was declared in this category.

== Philanthropy ==
Elmer is an avid bicyclist, riding for fun and fitness and taking part in numerous races, including century (100 mile) races, as she reports on the air. Since 2008 she has participated in the Bike MS ride to raise money for the National Multiple Sclerosis Society. While she was the afternoon news anchor on KFI, her participation was mentioned on The John and Ken Show, and listeners were exhorted, often loudly, by John Kobylt, to make donations. The KFI team, which Elmer co-chaired with the station's News Director, Chris Little, raised close to $100,000 in this way.

== Family ==
Elmer was born on a dairy farm in Brooklyn, Wisconsin, the eldest child of father Paul Elmer Jr. and mother Nancy Elmer. She has two younger sisters, Jill Farnsworth and Lori Weaver. She is married to Gerry Wallace.
