= Laura Schlessinger =

American author and radio personality (born 1947)

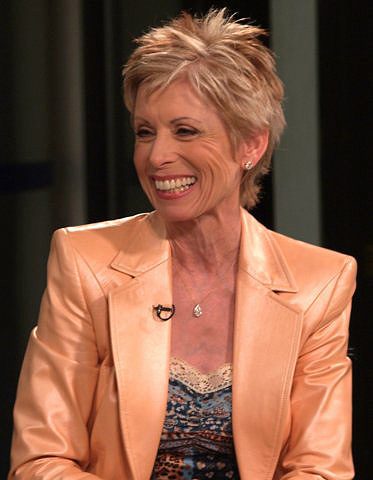
- Schlessinger in 2007
- Born: Laura Catherine Schlessinger; January 16, 1947 (age 79); New York, New York, U.S.
- Other name: Dr. Laura
- Education: Stony Brook University (B.S.); Columbia University (PhD)
- Occupations: Physiologist, marriage and family therapist, radio talk show host
- Years active: 1975–present
- Known for: Advice on relationships, moral and ethical issues, counsellor, political commentator, talk radio host, columnist, author
- Spouses: Michael F. Rudolph (m. 1972; div. 1977) Lewis G. Bishop (m. 1985; died 2015)
- Children: 1
- Awards: NAB Marconi Radio Award, Genii, National Heritage, National Religious Broadcasters, Office of the Secretary of Defense for Exceptional Public Service
- Website: www.drlaura.com

Laura Catherine Schlessinger (born January 16, 1947), commonly known as Dr. Laura, is an American talk radio host and author. The Dr. Laura Program, heard weekdays for three hours on Sirius XM Radio, consists mainly of her responses to callers' requests for personal advice and often features her short monologues on social and political topics. Her website says that her show "preaches, teaches, and nags about morals, values, and ethics." She is an inductee to the National Radio Hall of Fame in Chicago.

Schlessinger used to combine her local radio career in Los Angeles with a private practice as a marriage and family counselor. However, after going into national radio syndication, she concentrated her efforts on The Dr. Laura Program heard each weekday, and on writing self-help books. The books Ten Stupid Things Women Do to Mess Up Their Lives and The Proper Care and Feeding of Husbands are among her bestselling works. A short-lived television talk show hosted by Schlessinger was launched in 2000. In August 2010, she announced that she would end her syndicated radio show in December 2010. Her show moved to the Sirius XM Stars satellite radio channel on January 3, 2011. Schlessinger announced a "multiyear" deal to be on satellite radio. On November 5, 2018, her radio program moved to the Sirius XM Triumph Channel 111.

== Early life ==
Schlessinger was born in the New York City borough of Brooklyn. She was raised in Brooklyn and later on Long Island. Her parents were Monroe "Monty" Schlessinger, a Jewish American civil engineer, and Yolanda (née Ceccovini) Schlessinger, a Roman Catholic war bride from Italy. Schlessinger has said her father was charming and her mother beautiful as a young woman. She has a sister, Cindy, who is 11 years her junior. Schlessinger has described her childhood environment as unloving and unpleasant, and her family as dysfunctional. She has ascribed some of the difficulty to extended family rejection of her parents' mixed-faith Jewish-Catholic marriage. Schlessinger said her father was "petty, insensitive, mean, thoughtless, demeaning, and downright unloving". She described her mother as a person with "pathological pride", who "was never grateful", who "would always find something to criticize," and who "constantly expressed disdain for men, sex, and love". She credited her father with giving her the drive to succeed.

Schlessinger attended Westbury High School and Jericho High School, where she showed an interest in science. She received a bachelor's degree from Stony Brook University. Moving to Columbia University for graduate studies, she earned a master's and PhD in physiology in 1974. Her doctoral thesis was on insulin's effects on laboratory rats. After she began dispensing personal advice on the radio, she obtained training and certification in marriage and family counseling from the University of Southern California, where she worked in the biology department, and a therapist's license from the State of California. In addition, she opened up a part-time practice as a marriage and family therapist.

== Radio career ==
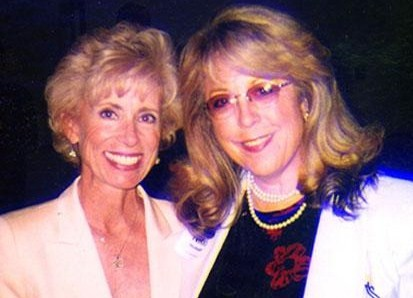
Schlessinger with Nikki Hornsby in 2009. Schlessinger used Hornsby's song "Hot Talkin' Big Shot" for several years as theme music

Hot Talkin' Big Shot

Schlessinger's first appearance on the radio was in 1975 when she called in to a KABC show hosted by Bill Ballance. Impressed by her quick wit and sense of humor, Ballance began featuring her in a weekly segment. Schlessinger's stint on Ballance's show led to her own shows on a series of small radio stations. By 1979, she was on the air Sunday evenings from 9:00 to midnight on KWIZ in Santa Ana, California. That year, the Los Angeles Times described her show as dealing with all types of emotional problems, "though sex therapy is the show's major focus".

In the late 1980s, Schlessinger was filling in for Barbara De Angelis' noon-time, relationship-oriented talk show in Los Angeles on KFI, while working weekends at KGIL in San Fernando. Her big break came when Sally Jessy Raphael began working at ABC Radio, and Maurice Tunick, former vice president of talk programming for the ABC Radio Networks, needed a regular substitute for Raphael's evening personal-advice show. Tunick chose Schlessinger to fill in for Raphael.

Schlessinger began broadcasting a daily show on KFI, which was nationally syndicated in 1994 by Synergy, a company owned by Schlessinger and her husband. In 1997, Synergy sold its rights to the show to Jacor Communications, Inc., for $71.5 million. Later, Jacor merged with Clear Channel Communications and a company co-owned by Schlessinger, Take on the Day, LLC, acquired the production rights. The show became a joint effort between Take on the Day, which produced it, Talk Radio Network, which syndicated and marketed it to radio stations, and Premiere Radio Networks, (a subsidiary of Clear Channel), which provided satellite facilities and handled advertising sales. As of September 2009, Schlessinger broadcast from her home in Santa Barbara, California, with KFWB as her flagship station. Podcasts and live streams of the show have been available on her website for a monthly fee, and the show was also on XM Satellite Radio.

At its peak, The Dr. Laura Program was the second-highest-rated radio show after The Rush Limbaugh Show, and was heard on more than 450 radio stations. Writing in 1998, Leslie Bennett described the popularity of the show:

In an age of moral relativity, Dr. Laura's certitude compels ... Schlessinger's fervor is indisputably evangelical, and her listeners believe her to be a paragon, a beacon of hope and rectitude in a dissolute, degraded world.

In 2010—her last year on terrestrial radio—she was still No. 5.

In May 2002, the show still had an audience of more than 10 million, but had lost several million listeners in the previous two years as it was dropped by WABC and other affiliates, and was moved from day to night in cities such as Seattle and Boston. These losses were attributed in part to Schlessinger's shift from giving relationship advice to lecturing on morality and conservative politics. Pressure from gay rights groups caused dozens of sponsors to drop the radio show, as well. In 2006, Schlessinger's show was being aired on about 200 stations. As of 2009, it was tied for third place along with The Glenn Beck Program and The Savage Nation.

On August 17, 2010, during an appearance on Larry King Live, Schlessinger announced the end of her radio show, saying that her motivation was to "regain her First Amendment rights", and that she wanted to be able to say what is on her mind without "some special interest group deciding this is a time to silence a voice of dissent." Several of her affiliates and major sponsors had dropped her show after her on-air use of a racial epithet on August 10 (see § Use of racial slur below). Specifically, she said, "[n-word n-word n-word] is what you hear [in rap]."

On January 3, 2011, Schlessinger's show moved exclusively to Sirius XM Radio.

She currently offers a short podcast of the "Call of the Day" from her SiriusXM daily show, and it is ranked in the top 25 "Kids and Family" podcasts on iTunes

== Television show ==
In 1999, Schlessinger signed a deal with Paramount Domestic Television to produce a syndicated talk show titled Dr. Laura, which was carried in major markets by CBS's owned and operated stations and in 96% of the nation's markets overall for fall 2000. This was viewed as something of a coup by Paramount, as they felt that a popular personality such as Schlessinger could be the spark they needed to sell themselves as a daytime syndication powerhouse rivaling King World and Warner Bros. Television, which distributed the popular topical talk show The Oprah Winfrey Show and the variety talk show The Rosie O'Donnell Show.

Leading up to the September 11, 2000, premiere of Dr. Laura, Schlessinger created a significant amount of controversy. In the months before the premiere of her TV show, Schlessinger called homosexuality a "biological error", said that homosexuality was acceptable as long as it was not public, and said that homosexuals should adopt older children. She also expressed her view that "a huge portion of the male homosexual populace is predatory on young boys." Schlessinger was frequently criticized in LGBT media for these views. Gay & Lesbian Alliance Against Defamation, an LGBT media watchdog group, began monitoring Schlessinger's on-air comments about LGBT people, posting transcripts of relevant shows on its website.

In March 2000, a group of gay activists launched StopDrLaura.com, an online campaign with the goal of convincing Paramount to cancel Dr. Laura prior to its premiere. The group protested at Paramount studios, stating her views were offensively bigoted. StopDrLaura.com organized protests in 34 cities in the U.S. and Canada, and picked up on an advertiser boycott of the radio and the TV shows started by another grass-roots organization which called itself "Silence Of The Slams" operating its boycott through AOL Hometown.

On Yom Kippur in 2000, Dr. Laura said she "deeply [regretted] the hurt this situation has caused the gay and lesbian community" and asked for forgiveness, while abstaining from offering a retraction of her words.

Dr. Laura premiered to low ratings and unkind reviews. Critics and viewers complained that the format had been dumbed down and did not stand out from any other daytime talk show. The biting rhetoric that worked well on radio seemed overly harsh for face-to-face discourse, owing to the normal sympathetic nature of most other daytime hosts; the radical change in Schlessinger's demeanor from her radio persona left viewers cold. The television show failed to generate the energy and interest of Schlessinger's radio show.

The credibility of Schlessinger's television program also suffered during its first month, when the New York Post reported that Schlessinger had used show staff to falsely pose as guests on the show. A September 25, 2000, episode named "Readin', Writin', and Cheatin'" featured a so-called college student who specialized in professional note-taking. On the next day's show, "Getting to the Altar," the same guest appeared in different hair and makeup and said she was a woman living with her boyfriend. In fact, the woman was San-D Duchas, a researcher for the show whose name appeared in the closing credits of the shows on which she posed as a guest.

By November 2000, advertisers that had committed to Schlessinger's show had pulled their support due to plummeting ratings. CBS' station group was directed by the network to move Schlessinger off of their daytime lineups due to the low ratings, with nearly all of them moving the show to the overnight hours by November 13, 2000; in Philadelphia, the show was moved from KYW-TV to its recently-acquired sister station, UPN-affiliated WPSG, which followed CBS' directive and placed Dr. Laura on its overnight schedule. Other stations outside of CBS did the same thing, while others moved it to weaker sister stations. Dr. Laura aired its last first-run episode on March 30, 2001, on the stations that continued to air it, with reruns continuing until September 2001.

In 2004, Schlessinger said that although the money and celebrity in television is greater, it is not as meaningful or intimate as radio, and for her, television was a "terrible experience".

== Publications ==
=== Columns ===
For several years, Schlessinger wrote a weekly column syndicated by Universal Press Syndicate that was carried in many newspapers, and in Jewish World Review. She discontinued the column in July 2000, citing lack of time due to her upcoming television show. She wrote a monthly column for WorldNetDaily between 2002 and 2004, with one entry in 2006. In 2006, Schlessinger joined the Santa Barbara News-Press, writing biweekly columns dealing with Santa Barbara news, as well as general news and cultural issues discussed on her radio show. She suspended the column in mid-2007, resumed writing it later, then discontinued it in December 2008. She currently writes columns on her blog, on a variety of topics.

=== Books ===
Schlessinger has written 14 books for adults and four for children. Several follow the mold of her successful Ten Stupid Things Women Do to Mess Up Their Lives, with similarly named books giving advice for men, couples, and parents, while others are more moral in orientation.

=== Magazine ===
For several years, Schlessinger published a monthly magazine, Dr. Laura Perspective. She was the editor, her husband a contributing photographer, and her son the creative consultant. The magazine has ceased publication.

Schlessinger was invited to the editorial board of Skeptic magazine in 1994 after taking a stand against recovered memory therapy, but resigned abruptly in 1998 after it published an issue on The God Question, insisting to its publisher Michael Shermer that there can be no question about God's existence.

=== Website ===
Schlessinger has a website that contains hints for stay-at-home parents, her blog, a reading list, and streaming audio of her shows (by subscription only). When it was started, 310,000 people tried to access it simultaneously and it crashed. Certain aspects of feminism are often discussed on her website; she was a self-proclaimed feminist in the 1970s, but is now opposed to feminism.

== Charitable work ==
Schlessinger created the Laura Schlessinger Foundation to help abused and neglected children in 1998. Schlessinger regularly asked her on-air audience to donate items for My Stuff bags, which go to children in need. All other donations came from other people or groups, usually in the form of donated items for the bags. Per the foundation's reports, money not used for operations was directed toward pro-life organizations, such as crisis pregnancy centers. In September 2004, Schlessinger announced that she was closing down the foundation because it had become too difficult and costly for her husband and her to underwrite, and they wished to devote their "energies and resources to other pressing needs".

In 2007, Schlessinger began fundraising for Operation Family Fund, an organization that aids the families of fallen or seriously injured veterans of the wars in Afghanistan and Iraq. In 2008, she helped raise more than $1 million for the organization.

In 2017, Dr. Laura began donating proceeds from the sale of jewelry and glass art she designs and hand makes to Children of Fallen Patriots Foundation, a charitable organization that provides college scholarships to military children who lost a parent in the line of duty.

== Awards ==
She was the first woman to win the Marconi Award for Network/Syndicated Personality of the Year (1997). In 1998 she received the American Women in Radio & Television's Genii Award. She was on the Forbes top 100 list of celebrities in 2000 with estimated earnings of $13 million. In September 2002, the industry magazine Talkers named Schlessinger as the seventh-greatest radio talk-show host of all time. In 2005 and 2008,

Schlessinger received a National Heritage award from the National Council of Young Israel in March 2001. She also received the National Religious Broadcasters Chairman's Award, and has lectured on the national conservative circuit. She was the commencement speaker at Hillsdale College in June 2002, and was awarded an honorary degree as a doctor of tradition and culture.

In 2007, Schlessinger was given an Exceptional Public Service award by the Office of the Secretary of Defense. In 2008, Talkers presented her with an award for outstanding community service by a radio talk-show host.

Schlessinger most recently was named to the National Radio Hall of Fame, Class of 2018. Schlessinger and Nanci Donnelan (the Fabulous Sports Babe) are the first two women with their own national radio shows to be inducted into the National Radio Hall of Fame.

== Personal life ==
=== Marriage and family life ===
Schlessinger met and married Michael F. Rudolph, a dentist, in 1972 while she was attending Columbia University. The couple had a Unitarian ceremony. Separating from Rudolph, Schlessinger moved to Encino, California in 1975, when she obtained a job in the science department at the University of Southern California. Their divorce was finalized in 1977.

In 1975, while working in the labs at USC, she met Lewis G. Bishop, a professor of neurophysiology, who was married and the father of three children. Bishop separated from his wife and began living with Schlessinger the same year. Schlessinger has vociferously proclaimed her disapproval of unmarried couples "shacking up". According to her friend Shelly Herman, "Laura lived with Lew for about nine years before she was married to him." His divorce was final in 1979. Bishop and Schlessinger married in 1985. Herman recounted to Vanity Fair that Schlessinger told her she was pregnant at the wedding; Herman said the news made the wedding "particularly joyful". Schlessinger's only child, a son named Deryk, was born in November 1985. Schlessinger's husband died November 2, 2015, after being ill for 1.5 years.

In the late 1980s, when her son was almost 4, Schlessinger began training in Hapkido under Sayed Qubadi, and had earned a black belt in that art by 1993.

Schlessinger was estranged from her sister for years, and many thought she was an only child. She had not spoken to her mother for 18 to 20 years before her mother's death in 2002 from heart disease. Her mother's remains were found in her Beverly Hills condo about two months after she died. Concerning the day that she heard about her mother's death, she said: "Apparently she had no friends and none of her neighbors were close, so nobody even noticed! How sad." In 2006, Schlessinger wrote that she had been attacked in a "vulgar, inhumane manner by media types" because of the circumstances surrounding her mother's death, and that false allegations had been made that she was unfit to dispense advice based on family values. She said that she had not mourned the deaths of either of her parents because she had no emotional bond to them.

=== Religious beliefs ===
Born to a Jewish father and an Italian Catholic mother, Schlessinger was raised in Brooklyn in a home that was without religion. Schlessinger was not religious until she started to practice Conservative Judaism in 1996. In 1998, Schlessinger, Bishop, and their son converted to Orthodox Judaism. and began instruction under Rabbi Reuven P. Bulka of Ottawa, Ontario, Canada. During this time, Schlessinger sometimes used Jewish law and examples to advise her callers about their moral dilemmas. She occasionally clarified ethical and moral issues with her local Orthodox Rabbi Moshe D. Bryski, before mentioning them on the air. She was embraced by many in the politically conservative segment of Orthodox Judaism for bringing more awareness of Orthodoxy to her radio show. Some of her expressed views were explicitly religious and are referenced her 1999 book The Ten Commandments: The Significance of God's Laws in Everyday Life.

In July 2003, Schlessinger announced on her show that she was no longer an Orthodox Jew, but that she was still Jewish.

Over the years, Schlessinger expressed opposition to homosexuality based on biblical scripture, at one point referring to homosexual behavior as "products of a biological disorder". Her rhetoric eventually prompted an open letter penned in the year 2000 responding to her position that used text of Bible decrees.

=== Libel lawsuit ===
In 1998, Schlessinger was in a Costa Mesa surf shop with her son when she began perusing the skateboarding magazine Big Brother. On her radio program, Schlessinger declared the magazine to be "stealth pornography". When the owner of the store publicly denied that she found pornography in his store, Schlessinger sued him for lying, claiming that his denial had hurt her reputation. When the case went to court, the judge dismissed her suit, but the shop owner's $4 million defamation countersuit lodged for hurting the reputation of his store was allowed to stand. The suit has since been settled, but the terms of the settlement have not been revealed.

=== Internet publication of nude photos ===
In 1998, Schlessinger's early radio mentor, Bill Ballance, sold nude photos of Schlessinger to a company specializing in internet porn. The photos were taken in the mid-1970s, while Schlessinger was involved in a brief affair with the then-married Ballance. Schlessinger sued after the photos were posted on the internet, claiming invasion of privacy and copyright violation. The court ruled that Schlessinger did not own the rights to the photos. She did not appeal the ruling. She told her radio audience that she was embarrassed, but that the photos were taken when she was going through a divorce and had "no moral authority."

=== Use of racial slur ===
On August 10, 2010, Nita Hanson, a black woman married to a white man, called Schlessinger's show to ask for advice on how to deal with a husband who did not care when she was the subject of racist comments by acquaintances. Schlessinger first replied that "some people are hypersensitive" and asked for some examples from the caller. Hanson informed Schlessinger that her acquaintances had stated, "How you black people do this? You black people like doing that." Schlessinger responded that her examples were not racist and that "a lot of blacks only voted for Obama simply because he was half black. Didn't matter what he was going to do in office; it was a black thing. You gotta know that. That's not a surprise." Schlessinger continued by telling the caller that she had a "chip on [her] shoulder," was "sensitive," and also, "Don't NAACP me," and, "a lot of what I hear from black-think ... it's really distressing and disturbing."

When the caller noted that she was referred to as the "n-word" by the individuals in question, Schlessinger complained that blacks are fine with cordially using the slur among themselves, but that it was wrong when whites used it to slur them. In doing so, she uttered "nigger" 11 times, albeit not directed at the caller. She discussed the word and its use by blacks and in black media. When Hanson asked, "Is it ever OK to say that word?" Schlessinger responded, "It depends how it's said. Black guys talking to each other seem to think it's OK." After the call Schlessinger said, "If you're that hypersensitive about color and don't have a sense of humor, don't marry out of your race." Early that evening, she wrote an apology to Los Angeles Radio People online journalist Don Barrett. A day later, as soon as she was back on the air, Schlessinger apologized. Hanson questioned the motivation and sincerity of Schlessinger's apology, believing it to be result of being "caught." Hanson also said that Schlessinger did not apologize for her comments on interracial marriage.

Schlessinger announced in August 2010 that, while not retiring from radio, she would end her radio show at the end of 2010:

I have made the decision not to do radio anymore. I want to regain my First Amendment rights. I want to be able to say what is on my mind.

In 2011, she began broadcasting on satellite radio with Sirius XM. Her program is also available as a podcast at iTunes and from her own website.

== Bibliography ==
Advice books:

- Ten Stupid Things Women Do to Mess Up Their Lives. Villard. 1994. p. 232. ISBN 978-0-679-41641-8.
- Ten Stupid Things Men Do to Mess Up Their Lives. HarperCollins. 1997. p. 320. ISBN 978-0-06-017308-1.
- Damsels, Dragons and Regular Guys (repackaged portions from Ten Stupid Things Men Do ...). Andrews McMeel Publishing. 2000. p. 80. ISBN 978-0-7407-0743-8.
- Parenthood by Proxy: Don't Have Them if You Won't Raise Them. HarperCollins. 2000. p. 288. ISBN 978-0-06-019125-2.
- Stupid Things Parents Do to Mess Up Their Kids (Parenthood by Proxy trade paperback ed.). Harper. 2001. p. 288. ISBN 978-0-06-093379-1.
- Ten Stupid Things Couples Do to Mess Up Their Relationships. Cliff Street Books. 2002. p. 288. ISBN 978-0-06-051260-6.
- The Proper Care and Feeding of Husbands. HarperCollins. 2004. p. 208. ISBN 978-0-06-052061-8.
- Woman Power: Transform Your Man, Your Marriage, Your Life (The Companion to the Proper Care and Feeding of Husbands). HarperCollins. 2004. p. 256. ISBN 978-0-06-075323-8.
- Bad Childhood Good Life: How to Blossom and Thrive in Spite of an Unhappy Childhood. HarperCollins. 2006. p. 257. ISBN 978-0-06-057786-5.
- The Proper Care and Feeding of Marriage. HarperCollins. 2007. p. 240. ISBN 978-0-06-114284-0.
- Stop Whining, Start Living. Harper. 2008. p. 208. ISBN 978-0-06-083833-1.
- In Praise of Stay-at-Home Moms. Harper. 2009. p. 224. ISBN 978-0-06-169029-7.
- Surviving a Shark Attack (On Land): Overcoming Betrayal and Dealing with Revenge. Harper. 2011. p. 208. ISBN 978-0-06-199212-4.
- Love & Life. Humanix Books. 2020. p. 223. ISBN 978-1-63-006125-8.

Religious books:

- How Could You Do That?! The Abdication of Character, Courage, and Conscience. HarperCollins. 1996. p. 269. ISBN 978-0-06-017307-4.
- Good People and Where You Fit In (repackaged portions from How Could You Do That ...). Andrews McMeel Publishing. 2000. p. 80. ISBN 978-0-7407-0741-4.
- With Rabbi Stuart Vogel (1998). The Ten Commandments: The Significance of God's Laws in Everyday Life. HarperCollins. p. 352. ISBN 978-0-06-019138-2.

Children's books

- Why Do You Love Me?. With Martha Lambers, illustrated by Daniel McFeeley. HarperCollins. 1999. pp. 40. ISBN 978-0-06-443654-0.
- But I Waaannt It!. Illustrated by Daniel McFeeley. HarperCollins. 2000. pp 40. ISBN 978-0-06-443643-4.
- Growing Up Is Hard. Illustrated by Daniel McFeeley. HarperCollins. 2001. pp. 40. ISBN 978-0-06-029200-3.
- Where's God? Illustrated by Daniel McFeeley. HarperCollins. 2003. pp. 40. ISBN 978-0-06-051909-4.

== Fictional portrayals ==
In January 1992, Schlessinger played herself in the Quantum Leap season four episode "Roberto!".

In 1999, Schlessinger was parodied as Dr. Nora on the sitcom Frasier. The character was portrayed as having dogmatic and fundamentalist social views that promoted social conservatism. The character was also shown to have a degree that belies her therapeutic advice and was estranged from her mother.

A fictional, non-speaking depiction of Schlessinger is briefly seen in The Simpsons eleventh season episode "Treehouse of Horror X", as one of the useless people put on a rocketship headed for the Sun.

In 2000, in the episode "The Midterms" on The West Wing, the fictional "Dr. Jenna Jacobs" is scolded by President Bartlet, who criticizes her views on homosexuality, and points out she is not a doctor in any field related to morality, ethics, medicine or theology. He quotes from the Bible to point out the inconsistency of condemning certain sins but not others. Show creator Aaron Sorkin admitted to modeling Bartlet's diatribe on an anonymous "Letter to Dr. Laura," which was a popular viral email at the time.

A fictionalised version of Schlessinger is featured as an antagonist in the 2000 animated series Queer Duck.

In 2001, Schlessinger was portrayed on the claymation show Celebrity Deathmatch on the episode, "A Night of Vomit". She was in a fight with Ellen DeGeneres; she lost.

== See also ==
- Culture war
- Talk radio in the United States
- Joy Browne – radio psychologist
- Toni Grant – radio psychologist
- Santa Barbara News-Press controversy
