= Marc Germain =

American radio talk show host (born 1967)

- Born: May 28, 1967 (age 59); Los Angeles, California, United States
- Education: California Polytechnic State University (attended); University of California, Santa Barbara (B.A. 1989)
- Spouse: Ann Germain
- Children: 2
- Presenting career
- Show: The Marc Germain Show
- Style: Talk radio
- Country: United States
- Previous shows: Ask Mr. KFI (1992–1996); Ask Mr. KABC (1997–2007)
- Website: marcgermain.com

Marc Germain (born May 28, 1967) is an American radio talk show host. He was previously known as Mr. KFI and Mr. KABC on his radio shows on their respective stations. He currently hosts his own internet radio show, The Marc Germain Show.

== Early life and education ==
Germain was born and raised in Los Angeles, California and was raised mainly in Woodland Hills and Tarzana. From ages 2 through 8, he lived in San Diego near San Diego State University. He graduated from El Camino Real High School.

He attended California Polytechnic State University in San Luis Obispo, California after being rejected from the University of California, Santa Barbara twice. He was able to transfer to UCSB for his junior year, where he graduated with a degree in Political Science in 1989.

== Radio career ==
=== Start in radio ===
Germain’s first venture into radio came at twelve years old in 1979. His father, wanting a hobby for each of his sons bought Germain a ham radio. Taking the amateur radio test twice, he was unable to pass the algebra content of the test due to his age (although he did pass the Morse code portion "which was very easy"). He was only able to use the radio to receive and not to transmit. However this was also the time of the citizens' band radio boom, so he obtained a citizens' band radio, and was able to acquire a then-necessary license for that. As stated by Germain, he was mostly active on channel 19 and went by the handle of “King Cobra”.

While completing his degree at UCSB, Germain felt drawn to the business of talk radio. Germain called the local radio station KTMS and offered his services to get a break in the radio industry. He was initially rejected, but through UCSB's campus job placement center, he secured an internship. Within a year and a half, Germain was the assistant program director.

=== Move to KFI ===
Germain returned to Los Angeles and landed a job at radio station KFI. After assignments screening phone calls for the station, Germain was given his own weeknight show, Ask Mr. KFI.

When KFI moved Phil Hendrie's show into Germain's time slot in 1996, the station offered him a different time slot, which Germain refused and led to him departing KFI.

=== Mr. KABC ===
In January 1997 after a 3-month contractually mandated non-competition period, Germain brought his show to KABC as Ask Mr. KABC. As part of promoting his show on the new station, newspaper ads ran in Los Angeles area papers claiming that Mr. KABC had been switched at birth and that explained his time as Mr. KFI. Later he would sometimes be known simply as "Mr. K". Initially, the show received poor ratings due to inconsistent time slots. The show was frequently preempted by Los Angeles Dodgers games while Germain also spent time filling in as a morning talk show co-host with Brian Whitman.

Germain's show began to blossom in March 2000 when KABC management dropped Stephanie Miller's syndicated show and increased the run-time of Ask Mr. KABC from one hour to three hours, occupying the two hours that Miller's show previously held. Germain stated, "Her [Miller's] show was cancelled because the station believes that I am a better fit and that my ratings are on the rise."

Midway through 2006, KABC pushed the start of his show back an hour to make room for a syndicated show from New York hosted by Mark Levin. In early 2007, KABC wanted to push Germain's show later in the evening for another hour of Levin's show. KABC and Germain couldn't come to an agreement, with Germain citing family considerations, and the two agreed to part ways.

=== KTLK ===
It was announced in March 2007 that Germain had joined a revamped KTLK lineup, which had just dropped its Air America affiliation. However, Germain's stint with KTLK was short lived with his show being cancelled in December 2007.

=== Talk Radio One ===
In July 2008, Germain launched Talk Radio One, an internet-only "radio" show. At first the shows were "Skype-cast" and he mainly talked to others around the world via Skype. When Skype ended that aspect of service on September 1, 2008, Germain transitioned to a mixture of live shows and podcasts.

=== Other projects ===
In November 2008, Germain filled in at KGO.

In February 2010, Germain joined Doug McIntyre and Red Eye Radio. The production, a part of Cumulus Media Networks, was heard nationally. The show ended in December 2011 when Cumulus handed the show over to two different hosts.

== Personal life ==
His wife, Ann, is from Long Island, New York. The two met after she hired him to work at KFI. They have been married since July 1992, and have a daughter and a son. Germain and his family left the Los Angeles area and relocated to Las Vegas, Nevada.

Germain is the youngest of four sons. His brother, Paul Germain, is an animation screenwriter and producer best known for Rugrats, Recess, and Lloyd in Space.
