= The John and Ken Show =

American talk radio show

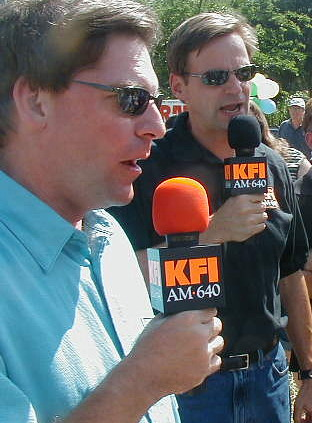
John Kobylt (left) and Ken Chiampou

The John and Ken Show was an American talk radio show, hosted by John Chester Kobylt and Kenneth Robertson Chiampou. The show aired Monday thru Friday, from 1 p.m. to 4 p.m. Pacific Time on KFI AM 640, a local Southern California talk radio station. The program was one of the most listened to local talk radio programs in the United States and drew an estimated weekly audience of approximately 1.2 million listeners.

== History ==
=== Origins in New Jersey ===
John Kobylt was born to a working class Catholic family in Paterson, New Jersey. His father, Chester, was born in Poland and, like many Europeans of his time, was greatly affected by the German aggression. He was taken from his family and held in a Nazi labor camp for five years. He then joined the British military and eventually immigrated to the U.S., where he married a Polish-American woman, Helen. Chester and Helen had two sons, John and Richard, and lived a fairly typical working-class life in northern New Jersey. John entered the radio business as a sportswriter after dropping out of Seton Hall University.

Ken Chiampou, a native of Brentwood, New York, was a certified public accountant and had graduated from the University at Buffalo, working in corporate audits for a Big Eight firm. Both worked in the Elmira-Corning market in New York state in the late 1980s, Kobylt as a disc jockey at WENY and Chiampou at the station's cross-town rival WELM.

Kobylt and Chiampou first worked together in 1988 for a radio station in Atlantic City, New Jersey. According to Kobylt, the show was named "The Odd Couple" by a producer who was the "stupidest man on two legs". Kobylt became program director of WOND. One of their earliest pranks was while they hosted mornings at 103.7 WMGM. They started a food drive for rival 95.1 WAYV's morning DJ Russ Monroe after he was fired a week before Christmas. The pair, as part of the prank, called WAYV live on the air to solicit a donation, which led to a hang up.

In 1990, the pair was offered the afternoon drive slot on the then brand new station New Jersey 101.5 (WKXW-FM) in the state capitol of Trenton, New Jersey. They gained national notoriety for heavily criticizing New Jersey governor Jim Florio for passing the largest state tax hike in United States history immediately after taking office. During this period, their ratings quadrupled to 600,000 listeners. Kobylt criticized Florio for reneging on his promise not to raise taxes. A caller, postal worker John Budzash, then suggested the idea of Hands Across New Jersey, a protest that would symbolically cut the state in half. When other callers noted that blocking traffic was illegal, the movement turned into a rally in front of the State House in Trenton.

A State Police officer told Budzash, who reported to the crowd from onstage, that approximately 65,000 people attended the event while another 100,000 people were turned away for lack of parking and because of crowded conditions. It was the largest rally ever held in New Jersey. Kobylt and Chiampou both attended the rally and spoke passionately about Hands Across New Jersey, better government, and lower taxes and they encouraged people to stand up and fight back for a better New Jersey. Florio lost reelection and John and Ken's listenership quadrupled during this period.

Kobylt and Chiampou also campaigned feverishly for the abolition of tolls on the New Jersey Turnpike claiming that cutting government excess expenditures could itself fund highway maintenance. They also lobbied for the opening of HOV lanes to regular traffic.

=== Move to California ===
The pair left WKXW in late 1992 to move to KFI to do their afternoon drive time spot, replacing former Los Angeles Police Department chief Daryl Gates. The hosts began national syndication in 1997, which displeased management at Cox Communications, then the owners of the station. At its peak, 125 stations carried the program. On March 19, 1999, The John and Ken Show was taken off the air at KFI, allegedly by a vice president in Atlanta over the syndication issue, although the spat was referred to as a "contract dispute". In addition, the hosts themselves were more comfortable with dealing with state and local issues.

Kobylt and Chiampou were replaced by syndicated consumer advocate Clark Howard from 3 pm to 4 pm followed by Karel and Andrew, the first openly gay couple in weekday talk radio in the country. Kobylt and Chiampou publicly referred to them as "Siegfried and Roy", and constantly berated the show for its low quality and lower ratings compared with their own show. On July 1, 1999, The John and Ken Show was reborn as a morning drive talk show on crosstown competitor KABC. The morning show was short-lived as they kept their afternoon show style and brought it to the mornings. Kobylt and Chiampou also had various stunts, one of which got them in trouble and forced them into attending diversity training, which they later said they resented taking, and disliked the Disney management toning down their banter. Due to low ratings and mutual dissatisfaction between the station and the hosts, KABC dropped the show on October 20, 2000.

The John and Ken Show returned to KFI on May 2, 2001, and the hosts regaled listeners with the behind-the-scene problems at KABC before returning to their normal topics. Since then they remained a live program; however, some interviews were pre-recorded and replayed between hours, and at times Kobylt or Chiampou would broadcast from their home studios.

=== Attempted expansions ===
John and Ken: Saturdays existed from 2006 to 2009. The show covered new material that was otherwise omitted during the week. The hosts did not actually show up to the studio live on Saturday but taped the Saturday edition during the week as time permitted. J&K Saturdays was syndicated to other stations. The Saturday show was cancelled in September 2009 due to an expansion in their weekday time slot from the cancellation of Dr. Laura Schlessinger's program. With the hiring of Bill Carroll.

From September 2009 until July 2010, The John and Ken Show simulcast the 3 p.m. to 7 p.m. portion of the show on San Francisco, California's KNEW (AM)-910. It was replaced with John Gibson.

From January until December 2013, John and Ken hosted on KFI sister station, WOR in New York City, from 9 p.m. to 11 p.m. The first hour, from 9 p.m. to 10 p.m. was simulcast from the KFI show, while the 10 p.m. to 11 p.m. hour was live and local for New York City. The show moved from its traditional 3 p.m. to 7 p.m. time slot to 2 p.m. to 6 p.m. as part of a station revamp.

Starting in January 2023, the show was reduced to three hours and moved to the 1 p.m. to 4 p.m. time slot as part of a reshuffle of the entire KFI daily lineup.

During the broadcast of November 13, 2023, Ken Chaimpou announced he would be retiring and broadcast for the last time on December 6, and that John Kobylt will take over as a solo show on December 12.

== Awards ==
On March 4, 2006, Kobylt and Chiampou won the Radio & Records News/Talk Local Personality of the Year award, sharing the honor with KGO radio host Ronn Owens. Chiampou, accepting the award on behalf of the pair, mischievously thanked Antonio Villaraigosa, Stanley Tookie Williams, David Dreier, L.A. Archbishop Cardinal Roger Mahony, Robert Blake, Michael D. Brown, and Armando Garcia for providing the material that made the program possible. They were also nominated for the 2006 National Association of Broadcasters Marconi Award.

The duo was named one of the 100 most influential people in Southern California by the Los Angeles Times in 2006.

== Political and social activism ==
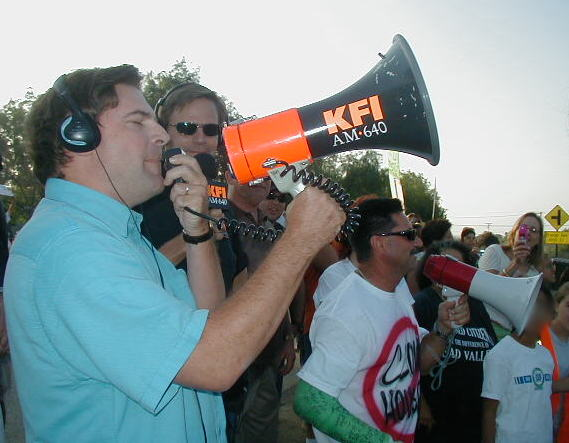
John Kobylt and his bullhorn – 2005 David Allyn Dokich protest

=== 2003 recall ===
In 2003, Kobylt and Chiampou were instrumental in the recall of California Governor Gray Davis. Davis, who was derisively called Gumby on the show for his shifting positions on issues, was criticized on a daily basis for the state's budget deficit, signing a bill that would give drivers' licenses to illegal immigrants, increasing the state's car licensing fee, offering large concessions to state employee labor unions, and for his alleged role in creating the California electricity crisis. The hosts regularly had recall petition gatherers on the air and almost immediately threw their support to Arnold Schwarzenegger when he announced he would run for governor. On October 6, 2003, as part of the fallout from Schwarzenegger's scandals, the hosts read information from the Los Angeles Superior Court, purporting that one of the key accusers against Schwarzenegger had a long criminal record. In fact, the information retrieved was about an individual who had nothing to do with the scandal, and the pointers to the information were provided by a Schwarzenegger assistant. The hosts apologized on October 8, after the election.

Increasingly, after Schwarzenegger's 2006 re-election, Kobylt and Chiampou criticized several of his policies, as Schwarzenegger moved to the center following the election. The tirades culminated with an image of Schwarzenegger's head on a sword after the governor signed the largest state tax increase in United States history (eclipsing the New Jersey increase).

=== Illegal immigration ===
In the run-up to the 2004 elections, their main issue was fighting what they saw as misguided policies of the federal and California state governments to encourage illegal immigration. They devised a "competition" that they dubbed Political Human Sacrifice, in which five Republican Representatives from California were grilled regarding their stance on illegal immigration. The "winner" would be the Representative whom the show's listeners saw as the worst on illegal immigration restriction; Kobylt and Chiampou would endorse his or her opponent in the general election and urge listeners to vote for the opponent. Political Human Sacrifice was conducted in a fashion similar to reality television series such as Survivor.

U.S. Representative David Dreier won the nomination as the "victim" of the "sacrifice". Kobylt and Chiampou also designated a Democratic Congressman, Joe Baca, to be "sacrificed" in the general election. The comments about Dreier resulted in a complaint to the Federal Election Commission being filed by the National Republican Congressional Committee, which was rejected by the FEC on March 17, 2006. Both Dreier and Baca won reelection. On the other hand, Baca appeared to have been unaffected as he garnered 66.4% of the vote in 2004, exactly the same percentage as his 2002 vote.

On May 2, 2005, KTLA entertainment reporter Sam Rubin made comments alleging that Kobylt employed an illegal immigrant. Kobylt demanded that Rubin apologize on his program for making this allegation without any basis in fact, and later Kobylt's wife called in to berate Rubin for making the statements. Rubin later apologized and retracted the statements on the KTLA 5 Morning News, as well as on The John & Ken Show.

Kobylt and Chiampou often do various stunts in regards to their topics. When Los Angeles Mayor Antonio Villaraigosa said to a group of illegal alien supporters "We clean your toilets", the duo urged their listeners to send toilet brushes to the mayor's office, of which thousands were received. Other jokes include taking Cardinal Roger Mahony's words of, "So Disappointed," whenever the duo are talking about illegal immigration.

In September 2011, Kobylt and Chiampou expressed opposition to the California Dream Act, a bill that would extend financial aid to immigrants regardless of their legal status. As part of their opposition, they broadcast the cellular number of a spokesperson for the Coalition for Humane Immigrant Rights of Los Angeles (CHIRLA). The spokesperson received several hundred phone calls from irate listeners, some of which expressed threats towards the spokesperson. CHIRLA said that the phone number was a private number, although the number was listed on the press release for the event. Subsequent to this, CHIRLA has called for the cancellation of The John and Ken Show, which KFI has resisted. Observers such as Gustavo Arellano have said that the show targets Mexicans specifically, in contrast to other KFI hosts such as Bill Handel that make light of all races, a charge the hosts deny. Kobylt apologized on KMEX-TV for the behavior of their listeners.

=== Sex offenders ===
When Long Beach, California residents protested the presence of several paroled registered sex offenders living in one apartment complex, Kobylt and Chiampou hosted a remote broadcast near the complex on February 19, 2008. Fueled by this story, on March 11, 2008, and approved with a required second vote on March 18, 2008, Long Beach City Council members voted 7–0 to enact 18 ordinances heavily restricting the residency and recreational activity of all registered sex offenders.

=== Whitney Houston ===
In February 2012, John and Ken were suspended for making disparaging comments in reference to Whitney Houston. While speculating on Clive Davis's reaction to Houston's death, Kobylt imagined Davis calling her a 'crack ho' and making other derogatory comments on Houston's alleged drug use and mental state. This caused a stir in media circles and in the African-American community as racially insensitive reference to the recently dead singer. They were suspended for seven days "for making insensitive and inappropriate comments about the late Whitney Houston." John Kobylt later said, "We made a mistake, and we accept the station's decision. We used language that was inappropriate, and we sincerely apologize to our listeners and to the family of Ms. Houston." Many in the Los Angeles radio market came to John and Ken's defense including KROQ's Kevin and Bean who used an entire segment of their February 17, 2012, show to discuss the duo's suspension and the current overall state of political correctness within talk radio.

== Format ==
The show is generally broadcast directly from the studios of KFI, with guests usually appearing on the show via telephone. There are occasional remote broadcasts to the site of news or to various political rallies. Also, KFI news reporters come on the show and expand on stories aired in the newscasts. The 5 p.m. hour is the most listened to hour of the show and is sometimes themed.

Recurring features of the show include Chiampou's Friday movie review, where he grades one movie released that week on a 1-10 scale, with 10 being highest; the "Moist Line", which plays edited listener comments on a voice mail line; and Hack in a Dumpster which is a homage to 2014 Ukraine revolution in metaphorically disposing of a public figure which the hosts disagree with. Other features include The John & Ken Health and Science Desk, covering medical news; Execution Desk, covering news on the death penalty; and Naked Desk, with news stories involving people who are nude.

One regular segment that does accept significant caller participation is The Hour of Rage, where callers rant either about a topic selected by the host or do freeform rants. However, it is common for an entire show to pass without a call being taken from a listener.

Kobylt and Chiampou were active during David Westerfield's trial for the Murder of Danielle van Dam. Kobylt shouted, "Hey, Westerfield, are you in there? Did you kill Danielle?". Kobylt also tossed broccoli at "vegetable head" jurors, who were not convicting Westerfield swiftly enough in his opinion.

== Political views ==
The hosts eschew any party labels or loyalties, and were not politically involved prior to their experience in New Jersey. Kobylt has indicated that his role is "to identify who the bad guy is and what the bad act is so that people feel it viscerally... pointing out how they were screwed in some way."

Mostly fiscally conservative on issues like taxes and spending, they also frequently lean conservative with regard to crime and immigration.

== Personal lives ==
Kobylt's wife, Deborah Zara, is a journalist and podcast host, and former TV news correspondent. Chiampou is unmarried, with no children.
