= Tracey Miller =

Tracey Miller (July 21, 1954 – October 7, 2005) was a radio personality, editorial writer, and newspaper editor, who worked for much of her radio career on stations in the Los Angeles area. From 1990 to 1993, Miller and Terri-Rae Elmer co-hosted KFI's TNT in the Morning, the first morning-drive show in a major market to feature two women in the lead roles.

== Life ==
Miller was born in Santa Maria, California. A four-time winner of the Los Angeles Press Club Golden Mike Award, she became founding editor of the La Crescenta Valley Sun in April, 2002, and wrote a weekly column for the Glendale News-Press in 2005. In July 2005, the American Women in Radio and Television established a merit award in her honor, to recognize chapter members who have shown commitment to the organization and chapter, and made positive contributions to the broadcasting profession.

Tracey Miller died on October 7, 2005, aged 51, from complications due to brain cancer. She is survived by her two children, Kelsey Leanne Showalter and Taylor Lee Brittenham.

== Station affiliations ==
Station	City	Years
KOB	Albuquerque	1976-1981
KOMO	Seattle	1981-1982
KFI	Los Angeles	1982-93
KABC	Los Angeles	1994-95
KMPC/KTZN	Los Angeles	1995-97
KLSX	Los Angeles	1997-2000
KABC	Los Angeles	2001-03
