= KFI =

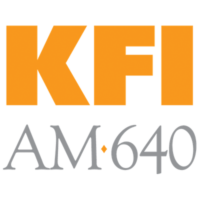
- Los Angeles, California; United States
- Broadcast area: Southern California
- Frequency: 640 kHz
- Branding: KFI AM 640

Programming
- Format: Talk radio
- Affiliations: iHeartRadio; ABC News Radio; KTTV; Premiere Networks; Los Angeles Dodgers (alternate)

Ownership
- Owner: iHeartMedia, Inc.; (iHM Licenses, LLC)
- Sister stations: KBIG; KEIB; KIIS-FM; KLAC; KOST; KRRL; KSRY; KVVS; KYSR

History
- First air date: April 16, 1922
- Call sign meaning: None, randomly assigned

Technical information
- Licensing authority: FCC
- Facility ID: 34425
- Class: A (Clear channel)
- Power: 50,000 watts
- Transmitter coordinates: 33°52′47″N 118°0′50.2″W (main antenna); 33°52′47″N 118°0′55″W (auxiliary antenna)
- Repeater: 103.5-2 KOST-HD2

Links
- Public license information: Public file; LMS
- Webcast: Listen live (via iHeartRadio)
- Website: kfiam640.iheart.com

KFI (640 AM) is a talk radio station in Los Angeles owned and operated by iHeartMedia, Inc. It began operations in 1922 and became one of the first high-powered, clear-channel Class A stations. It was the first U.S. station west of Chicago to broadcast at 50,000 watts.

Studios and offices are in Burbank, between the Warner Bros. Studios and The Burbank Studios. The transmitter site is in La Mirada near the Artesia Boulevard exit of Interstate 5, the Santa Ana Freeway. By day, its signal can be heard throughout Southern California, with city-grade coverage in San Diego, Santa Barbara and Tijuana, Mexico and secondary coverage as far as Bakersfield and northwestern Mexico, and at times can be heard some distance into Nevada and Arizona. At night, it can be heard across much of the western half of North America.

KFI and KNX (AM 1070 and 97.1 FM) serve as the primary entry points for the Southern California Emergency Alert System, which are responsible for activation of the EAS when hazardous weather alerts, disaster area declarations, and child abductions are issued.

KFI is licensed by the U.S. Federal Communications Commission to broadcast in the HD (hybrid) format; however, it was reported that KFI turned off its HD signal as of August 12, 2015. Like other stations owned by iHeartMedia, KFI uses iHeartRadio to stream its webcast.

== Programming ==
KFI is one of two iHeartMedia stations in Los Angeles which carry a talk radio format. KFI features mostly local hosts while KEIB (1150 AM) has a schedule of nationally syndicated talk shows. Morning drive time on KFI has been hosted by Bill Handel since 1993. He is followed by Gary Hoffmann and Shannon Farren in middays, John and Ken in early afternoons, Tim Conway, Jr. (the son of comedian Tim Conway) in late afternoons and Mo' Kelly in the evening. One syndicated show is heard overnight, Coast to Coast AM with George Noory. Two Los Angeles TV stations do live segments with cameras in KFI's studios: KTTV (Bill Handel) and KTLA (John and Ken).

Weekends feature specialty shows, some of which are nationally syndicated from KFI: Handel on the Law with Bill Handel, Rich DeMuro on Tech and The Jesus Christ Show with Neil Saavedra. Other weekend shows focus on money, psychology, food, home repair and unsolved crimes. KFI has news and traffic updates every 15 minutes and is an affiliate of ABC News Radio.

== History ==
=== Earle C. Anthony ===
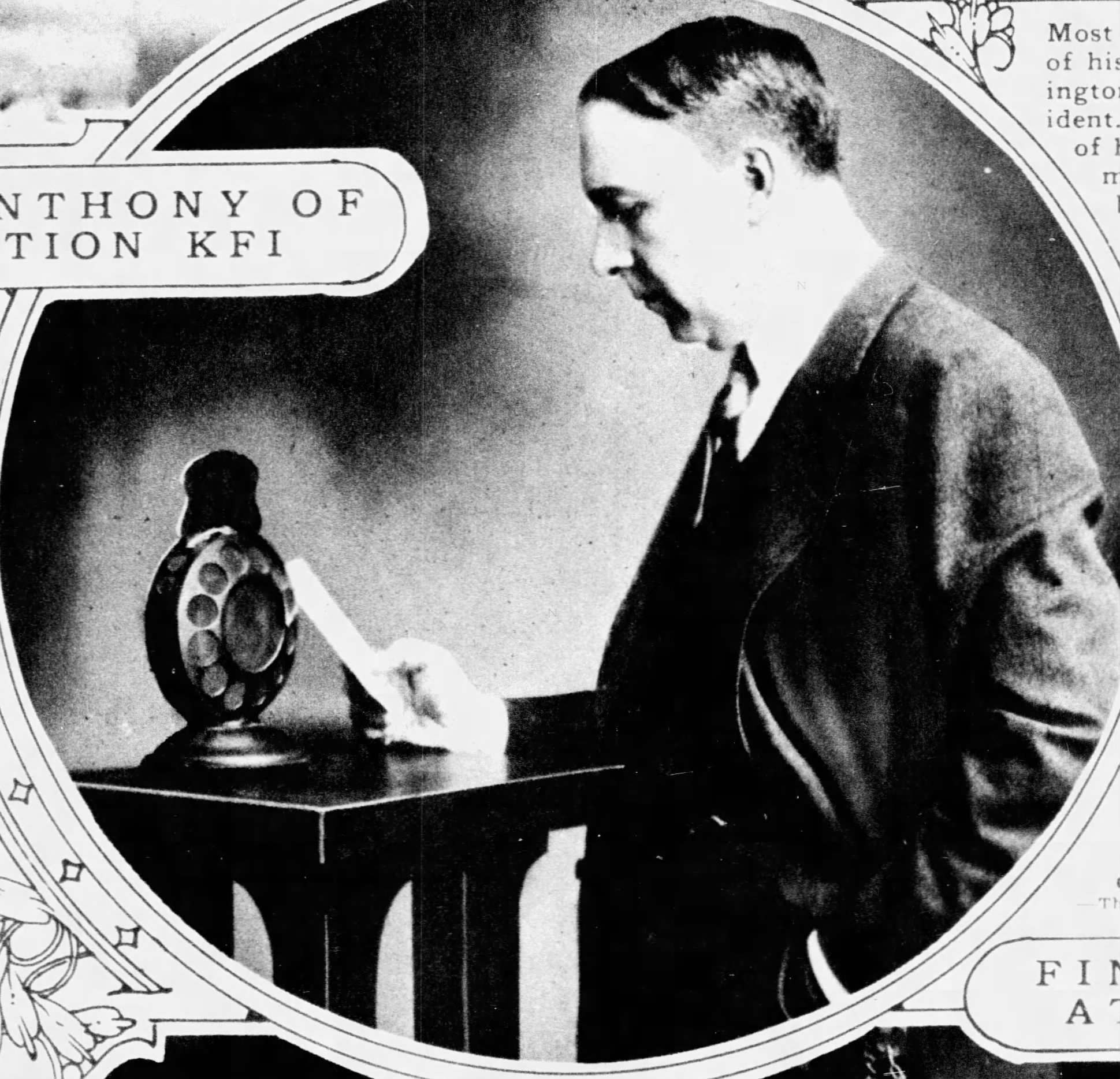
Anthony at KFI in 1925

Effective December 1, 1921, the U.S. government adopted regulations formally defining "broadcasting stations". The wavelength of 360 meters (833 kHz) was designated for entertainment broadcasts, while 485 meters (619 kHz) was reserved for broadcasting official weather and other government reports.

KFI was first licensed on March 31, 1922. It was owned by Earle C. Anthony, Inc. It operated on the 360-meter entertainment wavelength. The KFI call letters were randomly assigned from a roster of available call signs. The station made its debut broadcast on April 16, 1922. It featured vaudeville performers Eugene and Willie Howard. Earle Anthony had trained as an electrical engineer and in 1903, founded the California Pelican, UC Berkeley's first humor magazine. He was best known as the owner of a Packard automobile dealership.

KFI was originally located at Anthony's home, using a 50-watt transmitter Anthony had personally constructed on a kitchen table.

=== Shared time ===
In 1922, there was a rapid expansion in the number of broadcasting stations, most sharing the single entertainment wavelength of 360 meters, which required progressively more complicated time sharing schedules among stations in the same region. In mid-May 1922, KFI was assigned 1:45 to 2:30 and 4:30 to 5:00 p.m. weekdays. An August 1922 schedule reported that KFI was conducting broadcasts, in conjunction with the Los Angeles Examiner, on both the 360-meter "entertainment" wavelength (daily from 1:45 to 2:15 p.m, with additional hours of Tuesday, 9 to 10 p.m; Wednesday, 6 to 7 p.m; Friday 9 to 10 pm; Saturday, 6 to 7 pm, and Sunday 10:45 to 11:30 a.m. plus 4 to 5 pm), and on 510 meters (588 kHz) on Sunday from 7 to 9 pm. A regional schedule adopted November 1, 1922, listed KFI's slots as 1:00 to 1:30 pm. Monday through Saturday, 2:00 to 3:00 p.m Tuesday and Saturday, 10:30 to 11:30 a.m. and 4:00 to 5:00 pm. Sunday, and 9:20 to 10:00 p.m daily.

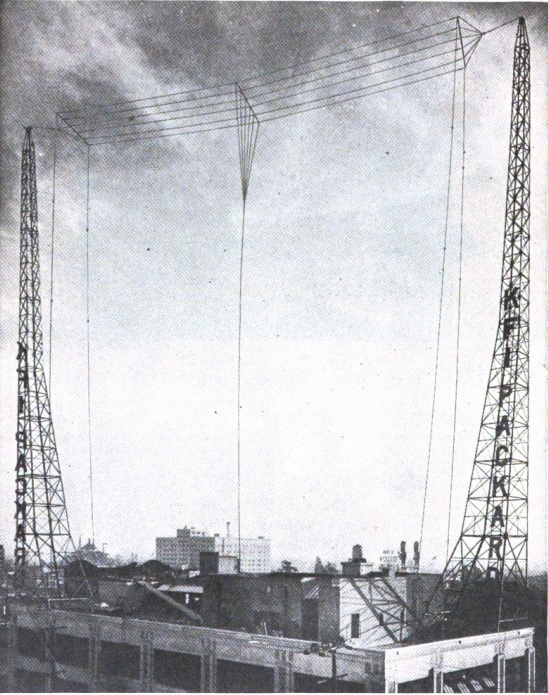
1925 photograph of KFI's rooftop "T" antenna.

Earle C. Anthony moved quickly to expand operations. The station's studios and transmitter were moved to the top of the Packard dealership building, formerly located at Tenth and Hope Streets in Los Angeles, with a rooftop "T" antenna mounted between two short towers. The installation reportedly cost $30,000, and included a 500-watt Western Electric transmitter, the most powerful commercially available transmitter at the time. This new facility went into operation on January 27, 1923. In September 1922 the Department of Commerce set aside a second entertainment wavelength, 400 meters (750 kHz) for "Class B" stations that had quality equipment and programming, and KFI was assigned to this more exclusive wavelength, joining KHJ on a timesharing basis. In May 1923 additional "Class B" frequencies were made available, with Los Angeles allocated 640 and 760 kHz, and KFI was reassigned to 640 kHz, with KHJ moving to 760 kHz.

From 1922 to 1926, early programming consisted of such things as reading news from a newspaper and local gossip. Broadcasting hours were very short, since Anthony was involved in many other activities, and programming sources were limited. However, Anthony stressed the need for quality programming that would be in keeping with his status as the seller of luxury automobiles.

=== Expanded programming and higher power ===
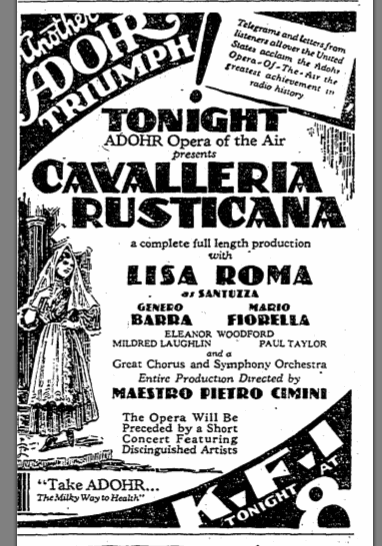
Advertisement for a live radio broadcast featuring soprano Lisa Roma, published in the Los Angeles Times on May 6, 1930

In November 1926, the National Broadcasting Company (NBC) was incorporated. When NBC's network facilities were extended to the west coast of the United States, KFI immediately became one of its affiliates. In joining this network, KFI had the advantage of NBC's vast entertainment and news resources. One of the first NBC programs to originate on the West Coast, and KFI, was the broadcast of the 1927 Rose Bowl Game from Pasadena, California, with announcer Graham McNamee.

On November 11, 1928, the Federal Radio Commission's (FRC) General Order 40 divided transmitting frequencies into "clear", "regional" and "local" classifications. 640 kHz was now classified as a "clear channel", and KFI remained on this frequency, now designated as its dominant station. KFI was allowed to operate with a non-directional antenna at the highest allowable power of 50,000 watts, while other stations on the frequency were required to protect KFI's signal from interference.

NBC operated two radio networks, the Red Network and the Blue Network. The Red Network carried sponsored commercial programs, while the Blue Network carried the sustaining ones where the network sold individual commercials within the shows. In 1931, NBC reorganized its West Coast operations, creating regional Orange and Blue networks that replaced its previous Pacific Coast network. KFI was part of the Orange group, along with KGO in Oakland, KGW in Portland, KOMO in Seattle, and KHQ in Spokane.

=== 50,000 watts ===
In July 1931, KFI increased its transmitter power from 5,000 to 50,000 watts, becoming the first U.S. station west of Chicago to broadcast with that power. A special 4-hour program was aired, featuring congratulatory speeches by NBC West Coast vice president and others, joined by entertainers from New York and Chicago on a coast-to-coast live hookup. Variety reported that Los Angeles mayor John Clinton Porter was comically effusive in his praise.

NBC's, and KFI's, programming expanded in 1930s and 1940s. The NBC radio network was owned by the Radio Corporation of America (RCA), which also owned the Keith–Albee–Orpheum vaudeville circuit, later renamed Radio–Keith–Orpheum (RKO). RKO handled many vaudeville comedians and singers, including Jack Benny, Burns and Allen, Fred Allen, Eddie Cantor, and Rudy Vallee, whose programs were highly rated. During the Great Depression of the 1930s, many people could not afford movie tickets, but they could purchase a radio where they could listen to commercially sponsored entertainment for free. During its early days, KFI carried such sporting events as the World Series and the Rose Bowl. Although KFI's call letters were randomly assigned, many people assumed that the "FI" stood for "Farmers Information". Every winter evening from 1924 to 1956, KFI delivered a frost report at 8 p.m. telling citrus farmers whether to turn on wind machines or light "smudge pots" to keep their orange and lemon groves from freezing. The frost warnings moved to 7 p.m. until the late 1970s when they were removed from the schedule.

From 1929 to 1944, Earle Anthony also owned KECA, now KABC. KFI was an affiliate of the NBC Red Network, while KECA carried programming from the Blue Network. However, in August 1941 the Federal Communications Commission (FCC) adopted a "duopoly" rule, which restricted licensees from operating more than one radio station in a given market. Therefore, Anthony sold KECA in 1944 to the Blue Network for $800,000. (In 1942, under the provisions of the Sherman Anti-Trust Act, NBC had been required to divest itself of its Blue Network, which later became the Blue Network Incorporated, and subsequently the American Broadcasting Company.)

=== World War II ===
During World War II, KFI was a prime source for war news in the Los Angeles area. It was feared that an attack on the west coast of the United States was possible, and people were warned to turn off lights and drape black cloths over windows, so that enemy bombers would not see identifying landmarks. Periodically, KFI and the other Los Angeles radio stations signed off so that any hostile aircraft could not use their signals as a guide for bombing attacks, which had been the case in the December 1941 attack on Pearl Harbor.

On November 29, 1944, KFI officials broke ground on Mount Wilson for construction of a new FM and TV facility. The ceremony was broadcast from noon to 12:15 p.m. over KFI. KFI-FM began broadcasting with its first test program on 105.9 MHz in July 1946, although other sources say the station went on the air in 1947. KFI-FM only lasted until 1951, when Earle C. Anthony decided to end operations and returned the station license to the FCC for cancellation. Also in 1951, KFI-TV was sold to the General Tire and Rubber Company. The station is now KCAL-TV.

=== Full service radio format ===
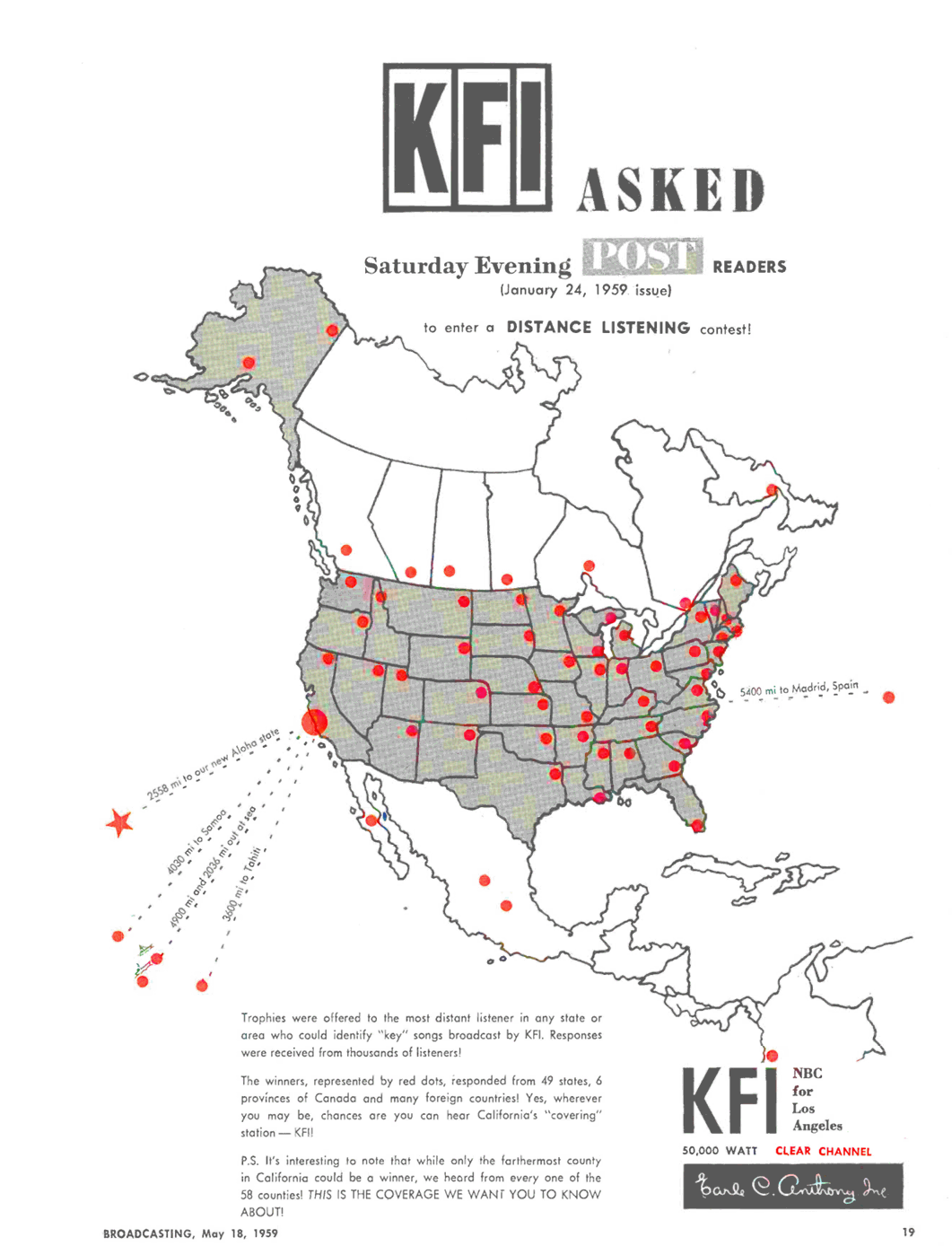
1959 station advertisement, displaying its extensive nighttime coverage.

In the 1950s, sponsors began a gradual migration from radio to television, reducing radio advertising revenue, and less money became available for quality radio network entertainment programming. NBC and the other radio networks began dropping large-budget entertainment shows in favor of news and information programming. "NBC News on the Hour" and "Emphasis" became the network staples as entertainment programs were slowly phased out.

NBC radio affiliates like KFI had to decide whether to reduce or eliminate their network connections to maintain profits. KFI began using disc jockeys playing phonograph records. KFI programming transitioned during this period from block programming, often featuring 15-minute shows, to a full service middle of the road format. Popular disk jockeys played records and chatted about local events, interspersed with aggressive local news and sports coverage. The station also carried Monitor, the NBC network's weekend radio service.

In the 1980s, as FM replaced AM radio as the primary source for contemporary music, KFI became a news and information outlet. KFI was the flagship station for the Los Angeles Chargers professional football team during its inaugural year in the American Football League in 1960, when the team was based in Los Angeles, before spending the next five decades in San Diego. From 1960 to 1973, the station was the radio flagship station of the Los Angeles Dodgers baseball team. KFI aired all the games as well as feeding the play-by-play broadcasts to other stations in the Southwest.

KFI's founder, Earle C. Anthony, died on August 6, 1961. In April 1972, KFI celebrated its 50th birthday. Festivities included a 12-hour special, featuring interviews and commentaries from many former NBC Radio personalities.

=== Cox Broadcasting ownership ===
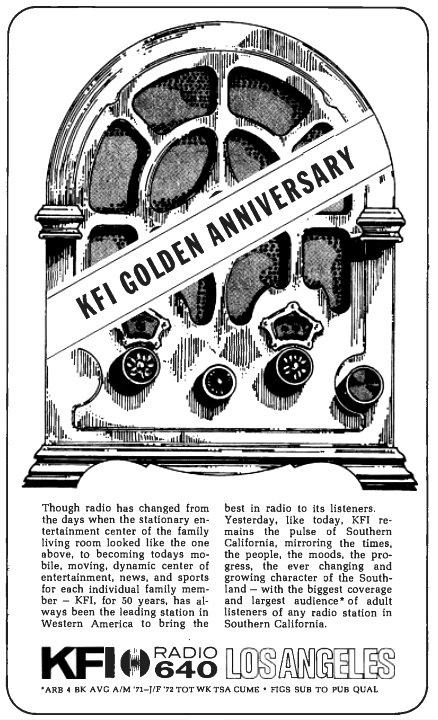
In 1972, KFI celebrated its 50th anniversary.

In 1973, Cox Broadcasting headquartered in Atlanta, purchased KFI for $15 million, which at the time was the highest amount paid for a radio station. James Wesley, Cox's general manager at WIOD in Miami, and that station's operations manager, Elliott "Biggie" Nevins, were dispatched to Los Angeles to manage KFI.

Cox instructed Wesley to find an FM station in the Los Angeles market to buy, and a deal was reached with Dallas broadcaster Gordon McLendon to purchase KOST (103.5 FM) for $2.2 million. Wesley also decided against renewing the long term agreement for carrying Dodger baseball, allowing KABC to become the new Dodger radio station in Los Angeles.

=== Top 40 format ===
Starting in the mid-1970s, KFI switched to top 40 music. Cox Broadcasting hired John Rook as the program director. Rook is considered to be the force behind the success of WLS in Chicago. One of his first hires was Dave Sebastian (Williams), formerly of KHJ, as music director and air personality. Rook's first air staff included "The Lohman and Barkley Show" with Al Lohman and Roger Barkley (top-rated in the morning), Mark Taylor (midday), Bob Shannon (afternoon drive time) and music director Dave Sebastian (evenings). Within the first year Dave left abruptly for crosstown Top 40 competitor KTNQ (1020 AM; Ten-Q). John Rook then moved in Eric Chase (midday), Charlie Fox (early evening) and Dave Diamond (late night). KFI shot to No. 1 in the ratings, at some points being the most listened-to Top 40 station in the nation at 50,000 watts.

By the late 1970s the staff was revised to Lohman & Barkley mornings, Tim & Ev Kelly in middays, Jack Armstrong afternoons, Big Ron O'Brien evenings, and Charlie Fox at night.

=== Personality radio format ===
KFI logo from 1981 to 1988

Rook and several of the on air personalities left in the early 1980s. At that point, KFI began softening its playlist to adult top 40 (in between top 40 and adult contemporary). By the mid-1980s the station was more news and personality driven than music intensive with a full service format.

In the 1970s and 1980s, the station featured a hybrid format combining adult contemporary music with comedian hosts. In addition to Lohman and Barkley, other hosts included Hudson & Landry, Charlie and Mitzi (Charlie Brill and Mitzi McCall of Rowan & Martin's Laugh-In), and Gary Owens. In winter 1984, KFI began broadcasting in AM stereo, with the Motorola C-QUAM system. The stereo broadcasts ended in January 2000.

=== Transition to talk format ===
By the mid-1980s ratings began to slip, as music listening switched to the FM band. In the spring of 1984, KFI was ranked 28th in the Los Angeles Arbitron ratings, ahead of only KHJ among the market's AM music stations. KFI moved the music to more of a soft gold-based AC and began to play less of it. The talk shows moved from a blend of entertainment, comedy, and lifestyle to more political issues.

Writer/producer John Thomas was assigned to Lohman & Barkley in 1984 and helped raise their ratings for the morning show to a tie for No. 1 in the 25–54 demographic in Fall 1985. Shortly after Thomas left KFI for WLS in Chicago the morning show fell apart. Barkley split off from the morning show to go to KABC.

The music was dropped in 1988 as KFI evolved to an issues-oriented talk format. The first hosts were psychologist Dr. Toni Grant, TV game show host Geoff Edwards and Tom Leykis hosted a politically oriented "combat radio" program. Competitor KABC, which had been doing talk radio for some time, sued KFI in U.S. District Court to have KFI cease and desist using the term "Talk Radio" with the call letters. Therefore, the slogan More Stimulating Talk Radio was created. Rush Limbaugh's nationally syndicated conservative talk show replaced Edwards in 1988 after Edwards refused to play promotional spots for the controversial Leykis show.

=== iHeartMedia ownership ===
In 1999, Chancellor Media traded 13 stations to Cox to acquire KFI and KOST. Cox opted to exit the Los Angeles market and focus on medium radio markets and its TV stations. Chancellor merged with Capstar in 1999 and became known as AMFM Inc. In 2000, AMFM merged with Clear Channel Communications making KFI Clear Channel's top AM radio station in Los Angeles. In 2014, Clear Channel changed its corporate name to iHeartMedia to identify its radio stations with its iHeartRadio internet streaming platform. The station license continued to be held by a subsidiary of Capstar.

On the day of the 9/11 attacks, Bill Handel was on the air for seven consecutive hours. Handel hosted his morning show from 5-9 am, then continued hosting from 9-noon as an emergency fill-in on the syndicated Rush Limbaugh show. Limbaugh was scheduled to be off that day, but his planned fill-in host could not broadcast from New York due to communication problems in the city. Handel's broadcast was also carried on the other Clear Channel stations in Los Angeles. In summer 2004, KFI became the most listened to talk radio station in the United States, beating New York City's WABC in cumulative audience during the rating period. That year KFI was named the Radio & Records "News & Talk Radio Station of the Year".

The syndicated Rush Limbaugh Show was heard on KFI from July 4, 1988, to January 20, 2014, when it moved to sister station KEIB. On August 10, 2015, KFI began a simulcast on KOST's HD 2 signal. KFI served as the flagship station of the Los Angeles Chargers, carrying all of the team's game day broadcasts from the team's return to the Los Angeles market in 2017 until 2020, when games were moved to co-owned 98.7 KYSR.

=== Federal Election Commission complaint ===
In recent years, especially since the 2003 recall of the Governor of California, afternoon drive hosts John and Ken have become actively involved in several political causes, most notably that of illegal immigration. In the months leading up to the 2004 election, the hosts instigated several political rallies advocating the defeat of Congressmen David Dreier (a Republican) and Joe Baca (a Democrat), both of whom they felt were wrongly supportive of illegal immigration.

As a result, the John and Ken Show was the subject of a Federal Election Commission complaint filed by the Republican National Committee, alleging that John and Ken engaged in an illegal campaign against Congressman Dreier. The "Political Human Sacrifice" campaign, as they dubbed it, was not successful, since both Dreier and Baca were re-elected, albeit Dreier by a substantially smaller percentage than in past terms. On March 16, 2006, the complaint was dismissed.

== Transmitter site ==
The main transmitter was eventually relocated from Anthony's Packard dealership to its present location in La Mirada, California, where a "T" antenna was erected between two medium height towers, and the studios of the KFI and its sister station, KECA, were moved to 610 South Ardmore Avenue. The 610 South Ardmore Avenue building is now home to the non-profit, Public Counsel.

In 1948, the "T" antenna was replaced by a 722-foot (220 m) vertical tower and a 200-foot (61 m) emergency vertical tower, as long before vertical antennas had been determined to be superior to "T" antennas for high-powered stations, although 195 degrees (which would be 828 feet (252 m) on 640 kHz) would have been optimum. Competitor KNX employs just such a 195-degree tower, as do many other U.S. Class A non-directional stations, and even some Class B non-directional stations. KFI was relatively late to convert from a horizontal to a vertical antenna: same-market Class A KNX converted to a vertical in 1938, and same-state Class As KGO and KPO (now KNBR) converted to verticals in 1941 and 1949, respectively.

There is an unpatched bullet hole in the ceiling of the transmitter building, where a National Guardsman accidentally discharged a rifle during World War II on December 10, 1941. The bullet hole has been preserved as a monument to KFI's wartime service.

=== 2004 tower collapse ===
On Sunday, December 19, 2004, at 9:45 am, Jim and Mary Ghosoph were killed when their rented Cessna 182P single engine airplane, traveling from the El Monte Airport to Fullerton Municipal Airport, struck KFI's transmission tower. The solid steel truss, originally built in 1948, collapsed upon itself, mostly landing in a parking lot to the north of the site. KFI's signal was knocked off the air for approximately one hour.

The Ghosophs had taken off from the El Monte Airport with a planned stop at the Fullerton Airport to pick up two passengers. From there, the plan was to fly to the island of Catalina to spend the day, after which they would make the return route to Fullerton and then to El Monte. Pilots had complained for years to KFI management that it needed to put strobe lights on the tower and highly reflective balls on the guy-wires. KFI and Clear Channel Communications management responded by saying the tower was in compliance with FCC and Federal Aviation Administration regulations and that it did not need to make any changes.

Until a replacement was erected, the station transmitted from the 200-foot (61 m) auxiliary tower at a power of 25,000 watts, but provisions had been made to transmit from the disused KRKD (KIIS) 1150 AM site just north of downtown Los Angeles, whenever the RF field towards the tower erection crew would exceed safety limits. Work was conducted at the site on November 19, 2006, temporarily interrupting a broadcast of Leo Laporte's talk show KFI Tech Guy at 11:55 am.

=== 2008 replacement tower collapse ===
At 2:30 p.m. on March 18, 2008, the replacement tower collapsed while under construction. The tower was about 300 feet (91 meters) tall (the final height was to be 684 feet (208 m) when a guy wire support failed, causing the tower to tip over in the opposite direction. There were no major injuries, and only limited collateral damage.

The reason for the failure is assumed to be a combination of factors, including the much higher per unit weight of the new 84-inch (210 cm) cross-section tower, compared to the 1948 tower which had a 42-inch (110 cm) cross-section, and the inadequacy of the 1948 pier and guy wire terminations, one of which had previously been modified to a cantilever design to facilitate the passage of vehicles under that termination (and, it was the cantilever termination which catastrophically failed during this erection attempt). All of these structural components were replaced or strengthened in preparation for erection of the third tower, which is identical in design to the (failed) replacement tower.

=== Third tower construction ===
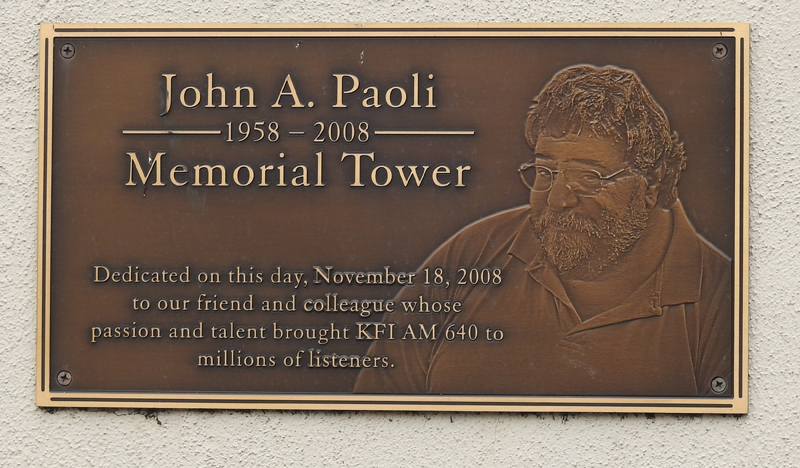
Plaque for LA Radio engineer John Paoli on the wall of the tower compound at KFI

Construction began on a new tower at the end of July 2008 and was completed on August 14, 2008, by Eli the Construction Guy (structural engineer). It has a 50-foot-wide (15 m) top-loading "capacitance hat", which electrically extends the tower's height another 75 feet (23 m), effectively, without actually needing more tower sections. The tower was equipped with high intensity strobe lights due to its proximity to the Fullerton Municipal Airport, and additional safety upgrades because of the previous plane crash. It has torque arms which limit the twisting of the tower in high winds. (Local regulation authorities in apparent defiance of electrical engineering principles, and communications law, demanded "a 10 percent reduction in overall height", otherwise the necessary permits would be refused, not withstanding the federal government's primary authority over radio communications, and KFI's strategic role as an Emergency Alert System station for the western U.S. region).

The station returned to full 50,000 watt power on September 25, 2008, at 5:00 pm. The tower has been dedicated to the memory of John Paoli, KFI Chief Engineer from 2000 to 2008, who died suddenly from a previously unknown genetic heart condition soon after overseeing the construction of the new tower. A plaque bearing the words "John A. Paoli, 1958-2008, Memorial Tower. Dedicated on this day, November 18, 2008 to our friend and colleague whose passion and talent brought KFI AM 640 to millions of listeners." and his likeness now graces the wall around the tower's base.

== Former hosts and on-air alumni ==
- Jack Angel is the former KMPC overnight host and cartoon voiceover, heard primarily on afternoon shows 1970-76.
- Jerry Bishop was the announcer for Judge Judy and worked for the Disney Channel. He had an afternoon drive show in 1973.
- Tammy Bruce hosted weekend talk show from 1993 to 1998. She was fired for making unflattering comments about Bill Cosby and his wife Camille, who had recently lost their son Ennis in a murder. Bruce was later syndicated on 153 stations including KABC in Los Angeles.
- Bill Carroll was on Monday–Friday from 10 am–1pm and hosted an edition of his show from Los Angeles for Toronto radio station CFMJ
- Michael Castner was a news reporter and later hosted The Daily Wrap from the Wall Street Journal. The syndicated show was heard in Los Angeles on KEIB.
- Chuck Cecil hosted "The Swingin' Years", focusing on big band music, from 1956 until the early 1970s. The program was nationally syndicated for more than 25 years and moved to KKJZ Long Beach last airing on February 8, 2014.
- Joe Crummey hosted evening talk show from 1988 to 1994.
- Mark Denis worked at the KFI Traffic Center from 1986 until his death in April 2000. He was the imaging voice of "KFI, More Stimulating Talk Radio"
- Dave Diamond hosted overnights on KFI's top-40 format in the late 1970s. Diamond died on May 5, 2014.
- Matt Drudge is a syndicated internet news personality who was heard on KFI Sunday nights until September 2007.
- Dale Dye - During the Iraq War, Dye was hired as a military commentator by KFI and given a two-hour radio show.
- Scott Ellsworth is the creator and on-air host of the popular radio program, "Scott's Place" that aired on KFI from 1969 through 1972. It was on from midnight until 4 am and featured jazz and big band music, interspersed with live interviews with musicians.
- Terri-Rae Elmer was a news anchor from 1983 to 2011. She hosted TNT in the Morning with Tracey Miller from 1990 to 1993. For the last 18 years she was with the station, she was the in studio news anchor during the John and Ken Show. The program was later heard on morning drive at KABC with Doug McIntyre.
- Charlie Fox hosted late nights on KFI's Top 40 format in the late 1970s.
- Ken Gallacher is a former news anchor for the Bill Handel Show.
- Daryl Gates, the former Los Angeles Police Department chief replaced Tom Leykis as part of the station's shift toward conservative politics. Gates died on April 16, 2010.
- Phil Hendrie hosted an evening talk show from 1989 to 1990 (sometimes alternating with Joe Crummey). Hendrie also hosted a syndicated comedy show The Phil Hendrie Show from 1996 to 2006.
- Mikel Hunter Herrington worked as a disc jockey at KFI in 1969.
- Dave Hull broadcast in the 1960s and 1970s. The "Hullaballooer" was heard primarily 9 pm-12 am weekday evenings. He spent more than 15 years at KWXY(FM) Cathedral City-Palm Springs. Hull began a syndicated weekend talk show in 2013.
- Geoff Edwards was first heard as a KFI music host in 1966. He hosted the early drive show from 1987(?) to 1989. Resigned as a protest to Leykis crushing listener donated Cat Stevens/Yusuf Islam records after Stevens called for a fatwa on Salman Rushdie. Edwards was also known as a TV game show host.
- Tim Kelly hosted middays with his wife Evelyn during the 1977-78 Top 40 format. He later moved to KIIS-FM and was a founder of Premiere Radio, the nation's largest radio syndication company.
- Tom Leykis hosted a KFI talk show from 1988 until 1992, which was politically oriented. He later hosted a syndicated show which leaned more toward comedy and pop culture.
- Hudson & Landry - the radio comedy team hosted afternoon drive 1974-75
- Rabbi Mentz hosted a show from 1997 to 2002 from 10 to midnight, and sometimes filled in for Bill Handel on morning drive. From politics to family life, sports to matchmaking, the show provided an entertaining perspective. Guests including Governor Gray Davis, First Lady Laura Bush, Paula Abdul, and Bill O'Reilly dropped by the show.
- Tracey Miller co-hosted TNT in the Morning with KFI newscaster Terri-Rae Elmer from 1990 to 1993. It was the first morning drive show in a major market to feature two women in the lead roles. Miller died in 2005.
- Kevin Mitnick is an infamous computer hacker who co-hosted a two-hour early Sunday morning show known as DarkSide of the Internet with Alex Kasper) from 2000 to 2002.
- Karel & Andrew - Karel Bouley and Andrew Howard were the first openly gay radio talk show hosts on a U.S. major-market radio station in 1998 and they also dated. Bouley was hired for the afternoon drive slot at KFI, the duo replaced KFI mainstays John Kobylt and Ken Chiampou (the John and Ken Show). "I'm sure there are a million gay [radio] hosts, but not many of them are open, and no one had ever appeared on the air as a gay couple," said Ron Rodrigues, the editor-in-chief of Radio & Records magazine." The backbone of their on-air banter was their contrasting world views. Bouley, who dominated the conversation, could be stopped in his tracks with a well-placed word from Howard". Al Peterson, a Radio & Records editor said, "They didn't feel like it was their job to be the poster boys for the gay community or to effect social change, just because they were the first openly gay hosts who were partners off the air.
- Mr. KFI - Marc Germain hosted a question-and-answer talk show from 1993 to 1996. He was fired from KFI in 1996 and then hired by competitor KABC. Germain hosted a similar show to Mr. KABC for ten years before leaving KABC for KTLK (AM 1150). He later created, hosted and produced shows for talkradioone.com, an online network.
- Scott and Casey - Scott Hasick and Casey Bartholomew hosted a show from 1994 to 1997, and again from 1998 to 1999. Hasick was involved in The Stephanie Miller Show while Miller was on KFI, performing many of the character voices heard on the broadcasts, as well as serving as production director and board operator. Bartholomew was involved in the John and Ken Show as the board operator, as well as writing and performing many popular "updates", and imaging for KFI. The pair exited KFI in 1999, for weekday afternoons on WKXW "New Jersey 101.5". After leaving New Jersey, Hasick and Bartholomew were on the air for stints in Detroit, St. Louis, and San Francisco. Hasick spent time on the airwaves in Charleston, South Carolina before the duo re-united in St. Louis. Hasick was later heard at Bonneville's WMVN and WARH in St. Louis, where he was fired after only a few months. He moved on to working in management for Nordstrom. Hasick currently works for Cobblestone Carwash as a regional training manager.

Bartholomew recently returned to New Jersey 101.5 as the afternoon replacement for Craig Carton.

- The Tim & Neil Show - Tim Kelly and Neil Saavedra hosted a weekend show, then replaced Tammy Bruce on weeknights. From 1997 to 2001, Kelly and Saavedra hosted various shifts and often filled in for Bill Handel. Kelly was a longtime contributor to the Bill Handel Program, penning and recording the bits and parodies which the show featured under the moniker "Dick Cabeza". Neil Saavedra is with KFI as the marketing director and on air with The Fork Report on Saturdays and The Jesus Christ Show on Sundays.
- Mike Nolan was known as "KFI in the Sky" and also employed by sister station KOST 103.5 for airborne traffic reports in the morning and evening drive times. He was let go after 20 years with the station due to a restructuring on November 30, 2007. As of January 14, 2008, he was back on air with KFI and KOST as a ground-based traffic reporter with an occasional KFI in the Sky from his own plane. He serves as an expert for aviation related topics and news stories.
- Big Ron O'Brien hosted nights on KFI during Top 40 format period of the late 1970s. He later hosted afternoon programs at KIIS-FM and WOGL in Philadelphia. O'Brien died April 27, 2008, at age 56 of complications of pneumonia.
- Ted Rall broadcast on Saturday evenings on KFI, briefly. He can still be heard filling in on the Bill Handel Show occasionally.
- Deborah Rich hosted a weekend, topic-driven show on Saturday evenings.
- Hilly Rose was on from 1972 to 1979. He hosted an overnight show on KFI known as The Hilly Rose Night Owl Show. He and his listeners conversed on the air about various subjects. As a child actor, Rose appeared on radio programs including Ma Perkins, and The First Nighter Program. Hilly Rose broadcast in Los Angeles on KABC from 1970 to 1972; KFI, 1972–79; KMPC, 1979–82; and on KABC from 1982-84. Rose also hosted a program on the Sirius Satellite Radio SciFi Channel.
- Turi Ryder hosted a weekend show for KFI in the late 1990s.
- Laura Schlessinger hosted the syndicated Dr. Laura Show from 1988 to 2009, giving listeners advice on romance and life. She moved to KFWB on September 8, 2009, and later hosted a weekday show on SiriusXM radio.
- Bob Shannon - afternoon drive MOR personality who survived the format change to Top 40 in 1977 and later went on to having a successful film/television acting career and acting coach in Los Angeles
- Paul T Wall was a former board operator for the Bill Handel show and on-air contributor to Handel on the News. Wall left KFI in February 2008.
- April Winchell - hosted a variety talk show from 2000 until 2002
- Bruce Wayne (Bruce F. Talford) was a "KFI in the Sky" traffic reporter. He was killed on June 4, 1986, in a crash just after take-off from Fullerton Airport in a KFI airplane.
- John Ziegler - hosted a political talk show from 10 p.m to 1 a.m. from 2004 until 2005. He was heard in the 7 to 10 p.m. time slot from 2005 until November 13, 2007. Each show ended with a remembrance of the September 11 attacks.

== See also ==
- List of initial AM-band station grants in the United States
- List of three-letter broadcast call signs in the United States
