= Ray Briem =

Radio personality who worked in Los Angeles (1930–2012)

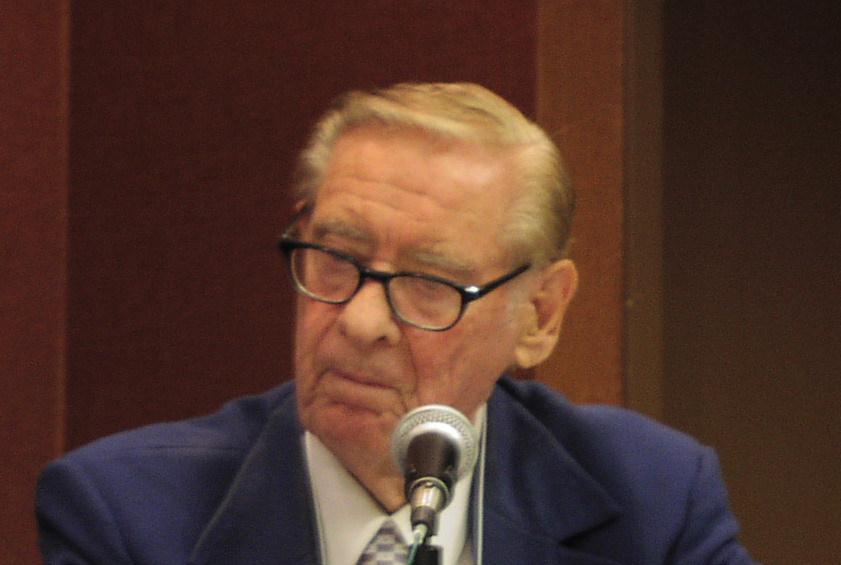
Briem in 2009

Ray Briem (January 19, 1930 - December 12, 2012) was a radio personality who worked in Los Angeles most of his career, most notably at KABC. He was noted for his conservative viewpoints, historical knowledge, polished delivery and love of Big Band music. He was especially capable of debating liberal callers and guests, but his shows were not limited to politics. He interviewed a wide range of celebrities primarily from the golden age of radio, music, movies and television. He worked the overnight shift and received good ratings. Briem consistently drew the highest ratings of any overnight talk show in Southern California, routinely attracting about 15% of the available audience. He worked as a nationally syndicated host for a number of years, a time which he has recalled fondly for the variety and quality of callers.

On his overnight program he was able to persuade many news and opinion makers to stay up late, or, if on the east coast, get up early, to make appearances. A frequent guest was Howard Jarvis, the attorney and political activist, who used the show as a platform to promote California's property tax limitation initiative, Proposition 13, in 1978.

Briem received a number of honors, including a star on the Hollywood Walk of Fame.
