= Toni Grant =

American psychologist (1942–2016)

- Born: April 3, 1942; New York City, New York, United States
- Died: March 27, 2016 (aged 73); Beverly Hills, California, United States
- Occupation(s): Psychologist, talk radio host

Toni Grant (April 3, 1942 – March 27, 2016) was an American psychologist and talk radio host.

== Personal life ==
Born Toni Gale Glickman in New York City in 1942, Grant received her A.B. degree from Vassar College and her M.A. and Ph.D. degrees in clinical psychology from Syracuse University. While in college, she married Dr. Neil Holland, an internist, and they had two daughters, Kimberly and Courtney, before divorcing after 14 years of marriage. Grant's radio success occurred mainly in Southern California, where she had moved with her family in 1970.

== Radio career ==
Prior to getting into broadcasting, Grant maintained a private practice, counseling former Vietnam veterans and later working with autistic children and people with schizophrenia. She first got started in radio as a guest expert on psychology on controversial Los Angeles talk show host Bill Ballance's Feminine Forum, in 1972 on station KGBS, and then on KABC. Grant was so well-received that in 1975, she got her own call-in advice show on KABC radio. Almost immediately, she gained a sizeable following and received critical acclaim for her ability to handle the advice-giving genre, while being both informative and entertaining. Said Los Angeles Times media critic James Brown, "Grant... is a soothing, reinforcing sounding board for people with problems." In fact, in a world of increasingly angry and confrontational talk hosts, Grant came to be known as "the Doctor who tells it like it is, but in a nice way."

Beginning in 1982, Grant and several other KABC personalities, were syndicated nationally via satellite, on the ABC Radio Network. This brought her show to a much wider audience on talk stations around the country. That year, it was reported that she was earning more than $100,000 a year, more than other radio psychologists. She was also considered more credible than some radio advice-givers because not only was she a licensed clinical psychologist but she was also a member of the American Psychological Association. From 1986 to 1988 her program was heard on the Mutual Broadcasting System, another national radio network.

== Later years ==
In 1988 she remarried, to business executive John McCulloch Bell, CEO and chairman of the board of Bell Packaging Corporation. She also wrote a best-selling book called Being A Woman, in which she advised women to return to more traditional roles and embrace the idea of home and family. In 1989 she took a "sabbatical" from her radio program, which by then was originating at Los Angeles radio station KFI. During the following years she and her husband traveled extensively, and she also assisted him in his business ventures. In 1991, she and her husband relocated to Dallas, Texas, where she continued to write and do speaking engagements. In 1997, she returned to the air with another syndicated radio call-in program.

Grant died on March 27, 2016, in Beverly Hills, California, from complications from dementia.
