= Fitness Beach =

American television series

Fitness Beach was a TV fitness and exercise show that aired on ESPN2 in the 1990s.

The cast of the program included Kathy Derry, Deborah Khazei, Denise Paglia and Leeann Tweeden. Jennifer Goodwin, the fitness model (not to be confused with the actress Ginnifer Goodwin) was also featured in the last season.

The program was produced by High Bar Productions, which also produced other ESPN2 exercise programs such as BodyShaping and Co-ed Training.
