= Leeann Tweeden =

American journalist

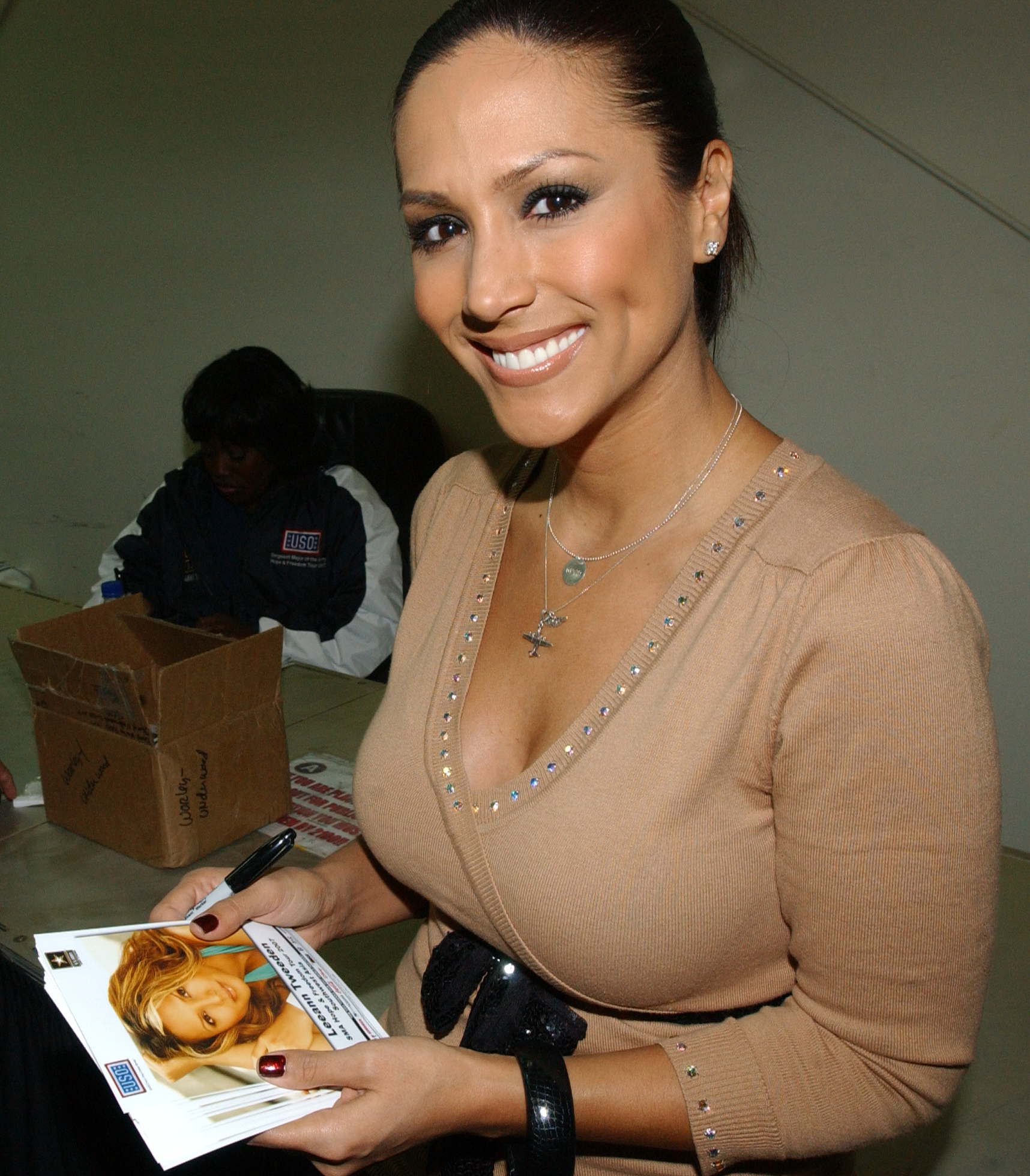
- Tweeden at Camp Arifjan in December 2007
- Born: Manassas, Virginia, U.S.
- Occupations: Model, announcer, television personality
- Spouse: Chris Dougherty (m. 2010)
- Children: 2
- Modeling information
- Height: 5 ft 5 in (165 cm)
- Hair color: brunette
- Eye color: brown
- Website: leeanntweeden.com

Leeann Tweeden is an American radio broadcaster, model and sports commentator. She is co-host of Dr. Drew Midday Live on Radio 790 KABC in Los Angeles.

== Early life ==
Tweeden was born in Manassas, Virginia, to Bill Tweeden, a retired Air Force Chief Mechanic, and his wife Catherine. She is of Filipino descent on her mother's side. After graduating from Osbourn Park High School in 1991, Tweeden moved to Los Angeles, California to pursue a career in modeling.

== Career ==
In 1992, while working as a hostess at a Hooters restaurant in Colorado Springs, Colorado, she won first place in the Venus International Model Search. This break led to national exposure, including a regular role as a fitness model on the TV show Fitness Beach. Tweeden modeled for promotional work for Hooters (which included an appearance in the restaurant's 1994 calendar), Venus International, and Frederick's of Hollywood. In the early 2000s, Tweeden hosted many segments of the Fox Sports Net show, Bluetorch TV. Tweeden was a correspondent for Fox Sports Networks' The Best Damn Sports Show Period from 2001 to 2007. In 2008, Tweeden became the third hostess of the NBC late night television series Poker After Dark. She has also appeared on the political discussion series Hannity in 2011 and 2012. She was a member of the "Great American Panel" and also occasionally appeared on the panel of Red Eye w/ Greg Gutfeld. Tweeden was seen in pre- and post-game coverage of the Los Angeles Angels of Anaheim on Fox Sports West and on Fox Sports 1's UFC Tonight, with Kenny Florian and Ariel Helwani.

On February 7, 2017, Tweeden joined the cast of the Los Angeles morning radio show McIntyre in the Morning on KABC, 790 AM as the news anchor.

On January 7, 2019, Tweeden became the co-host of Dr. Drew Midday on KABC, 790 AM.

=== Appearances ===
In August 1996, Tweeden appeared on the cover of Playboy magazine and as part of a fitness model pictorial for that issue. She did not appear nude. In December 2011, at 38 years old, she again appeared on the cover of Playboy, and in that issue was featured in a nude pictorial.

In 2002, she was a guest character in the motocross video game Freekstyle as a motocross rider. The March 2007 issue of FHM (the final U.S. issue ever printed) featured Tweeden as the cover girl. As part of Hooters' 25th anniversary in 2008, she was named among "The Top Hooters Girls of all time".

Since 2002, Tweeden has participated in 16 tours with the USO including 12 to Afghanistan and Iraq.

In 2012, Tweeden made an appearance on the season 10 finale of That Metal Show.

== Allegations against Al Franken ==
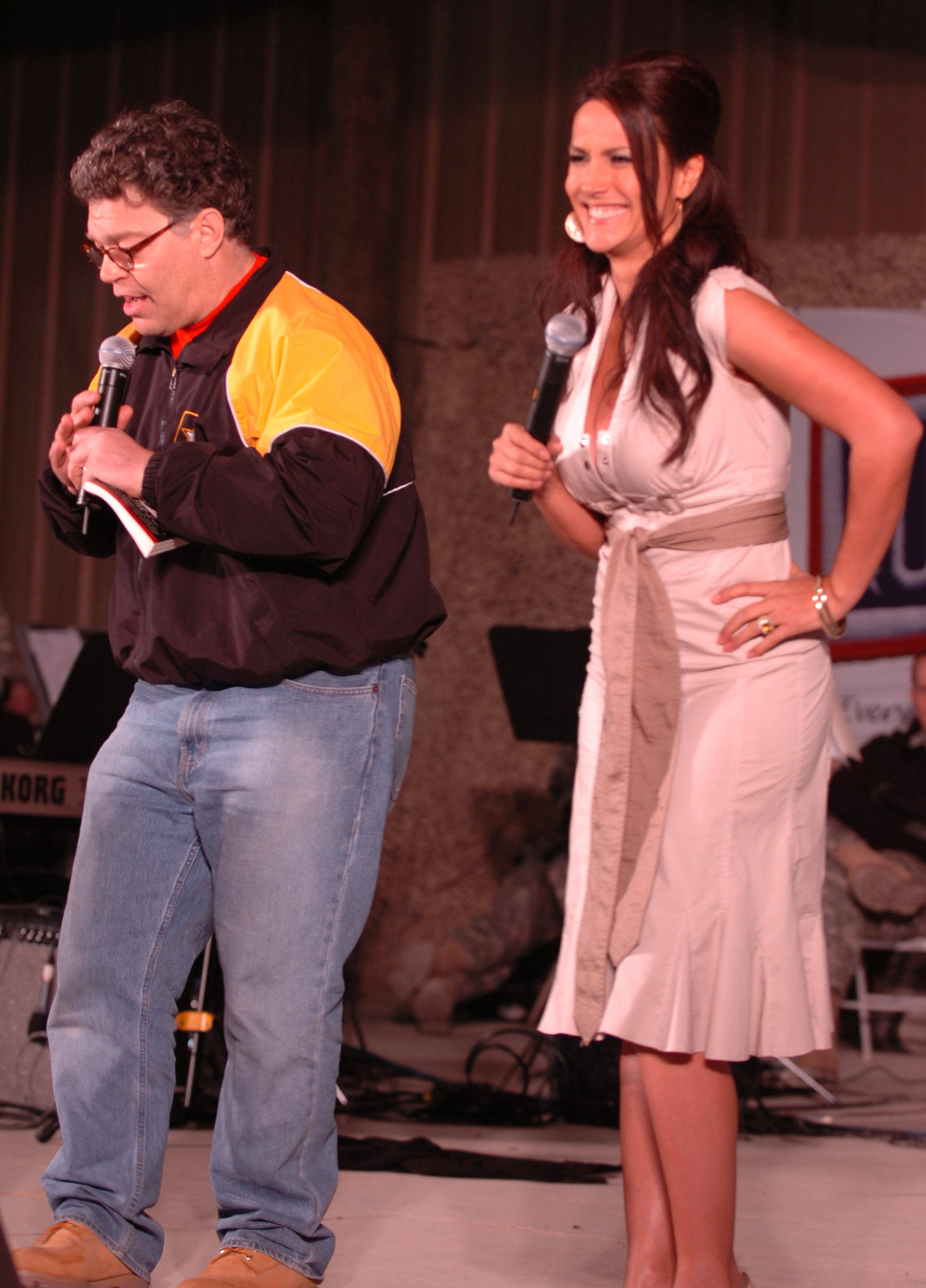
Franken and Tweeden in Kuwait on their 2006 USO tour

On October 30, 2017, California Congresswoman Jackie Speier was interviewed by the McIntyre show about a sexual assault that occurred when she was in her 20s and was a congressional staffer for Representative Leo Ryan. She alleged that Ryan's chief of staff "kissed me and stuck his tongue in my mouth". According to the show's host Doug McIntyre, that led to a conversation with Tweeden about an alleged incident of sexual harassment between her and Minnesota U.S. Senator Al Franken. With McIntyre's assistance, Tweeden prepared to make a public statement about her allegations.

Ahead of Tweeden's public statements, a Fox News executive tipped off conservative political consultant Roger Stone. Stone circulated news of the allegations to right-wing media and made Twitter posts referring to the allegations, including a statement that "It’s Al Franken's 'time in the barrel.'". Following the posting of Tweeden's story, far-right radio show host and prominent (Note: New York magazine has described Jones as "America's leading conspiracy theorist", and the Southern Poverty Law Center describes him as "the most prolific conspiracy theorist in contemporary America".) conspiracy theorist Alex Jones broadcast that Stone had told him, in advance, "Get ready. Franken’s next".

On November 16, 2017, Tweeden went public with the allegations in a blog post and radio interview. According to Tweeden, Franken kissed her on a 2006 USO tour during a rehearsal for a comedy skit in which they kissed. She wrote that he "came at me, put his hand on the back of my head, mashed his lips against mine and aggressively stuck his tongue in my mouth." She said she pushed him away, feeling "disgusted and violated". Tweeden's post alleged that Franken "wrote that sketch just to kiss me". Tweeden wrote that Franken also posed for a photograph with her while she was asleep on the C-17 cargo plane flying home. According to The Washington Post, the photograph "shows Franken looking into a camera, his hands either over or on Tweeden’s chest as she slept".

Franken disputed Tweeden's version. In a long-form article covering the allegations for The New Yorker, Jane Mayer wrote that, according to Franken, Tweeden's "accusations appropriated jokes from comic routines that they’d performed together". The routines were intended to be references to the "frankly lascivious" Bob Hope/Raquel Welch USO skits of the Vietnam era. Franken denied writing the skit with the kissing scene solely for Tweeden; actors Karri Turner and Traylor Portman confirmed that they had performed the skit in 2003 and 2005, respectively, and that the scene "looked like kissing but wasn't". The photograph may have been taken as a parody of a skit that had been used in the USO show's comedy routine. In the skit, Franken appears as a doctor who informs Tweeden's character that "a woman your age should have a complete breast examination every year"; Franken then approaches her with his arms outstretched and his hands aimed at her chest.

CNBC's John Harwood defended Franken by pointing out that Tweeden had been filmed on a 2004 USO tour "humping" comedian Robin Williams: "[T]hat pic was obviously a joke, not groping, just like Leeann Tweeden wrapping her leg around Robin Williams and smacking his butt; entertainment for soldiers deployed overseas is raunchy like that."

Franken responded, saying: "I certainly don't remember the rehearsal for the skit in the same way, but I send my sincerest apologies to Leeann. [...] As to the photo, it was clearly intended to be funny but wasn't. I shouldn't have done it." He issued a longer apology later, which Tweeden accepted. Other accusations of sexual misconduct—including grabbing a woman's bottom while posing for a photo—followed Tweeden's. Franken resigned from the Senate on January 2, 2018.

== Personal life ==
Tweeden met her husband, Chris Dougherty, a pilot for the California Air National Guard, during a USO tour. They married in 2010. They have two children, son Kane and daughter Kaia.

She considers herself fiscally conservative and said that she voted twice for President George W. Bush.

== See also ==
- Deanna Merryman, a fellow model who attended high school with Tweeden.
