= Ron O'Brien (DJ) =

American disc jockey (1951–2008)

"Big" Ron O'Brien (real name: Richard Walls; October 24, 1951 – April 27, 2008) was a disc jockey who worked at many top radio stations during his lifetime.

O'Brien grew up in Des Moines, IA, and worked at KBAB in Indianola and KYNA in Des Moines. He started in 1969 at KUDL (now KMBZ-FM) in Kansas City. During the ensuing years, he worked for many stations, including KTLK in Denver, WCAR in Detroit, WQXI in Atlanta, WCFL (now WMVP) in Chicago, WOKY in Milwaukee, WFIL in Philadelphia, KFI and KIIS in Los Angeles, KWK (now WARH) in St. Louis (where he stayed for nine years), KZDG in Denver, WYXR (which became WLCE during his tenure and is now WRFF) in Philadelphia, WNBC (now WFAN) and WXLO (now WEPN-FM) in New York, WPGC in Washington, D.C., and WRKO in Boston. WOGL, also in Philadelphia, was his employer for the final six years of his life, and he had recently signed a two-year contract extension.

Big Ron had been the host of the syndicated radio program "On the Radio" from 1985 until 1992.

O'Brien also enjoyed singing. He recorded cover versions of "Everybody Knows Matilda" (Duke Baxter) and "Take Some Time Out" (Thomas Kemp and Robert Gordy), both of which were released on 45.

In addition to music and radio, Big Ron loved trolley cars and baseball.

O'Brien died of complications from pneumonia after a two-month illness.
