= Charles Karel Bouley =

American talk show host

Charles Karel Bouley, known on-the-air as Karel, is an American talk radio host, singer, TV personality, and author.

He began his career as a comedian and singer. Karel released one album and multiple singles in the 1990s, including the album Dance... Or Else. While promoting a record, he was signed to do a radio show on KYPA Los Angeles called "Different After Dark." After that show Karel and his now co-host and domestic partner Andrew Howard became morning drive at Triangle Broadcasting in Palm Springs, heard in the Seattle area . Then they went on to become the first openly gay radio talk show hosts on KFI in Los Angeles.

Andrew Howard died unexpectedly in 2001 and Karel stayed on KFI for two years solo. After a shift in management at KFI, Karel was let go; he subsequently hosted a show on San Francisco-based KGO. He was fired from KGO in November 2008 when his profane off-air comments about Joe the Plumber were inadvertently broadcast live. He would then regain his job in 2010 and stay at KGO until 2015. After being let go he began The Karel Cast as well as performing his stage show Karel Stands Up nationally.

Bouley subsequently has hosted a show on Free Speech TV, in 2014. He is also a writer.

== Early life ==
Karel was born Charles Raymond Bouley II in Miami Beach, Florida, in 1962. His family moved to California in 1975 where he stayed until 2015 before moving to Las Vegas. He has had one domestic partner, Andrew Lee Howard, who died in 2001. He began performing in college, did drag in the early 1980s as The Divine Miss Mess (impersonating Bette Midler) and began singing in LGBTQ clubs. He entered radio in the late 90s along with recording singles and an album. He has written for the media since 1978. His early life is chronicled in his semi-autobiographical 2004 release "You Can't Say That".

== Career ==
=== Musical career ===
In 1993 Karel recorded "Everybody Get On Up". Billboard reviewed the single April 3, 1993. In 1994 he released "Turn It Up" produced by Sabby Reyes and Thea Austin Karel did a cover of the Madonna hit "Live to Tell" in August 1995. In 1995 he released the album "Dance...Or Else"; Larry Flick named the it one of the Top 10 Dance Albums of 1995. In 1996 he was nominated for a Gay And Lesbian American Music Award (GLAMA). In 1996 he recorded a remake of the late Sylvester hit "Don't Stop" produced by Steve Bronski of Bronski Beat and remixed by the Factory Team. In 1997, Karel signed with Jellybean Recordings and recorded "I Am" and "Take Your Heartache Away" both produced by Jellybean.

In 2018, he released "Stronger Together" co-written by himself and Morgan Mallory and featuring himself, Mallory, Thea Austin (from Snap!) and Daniel Charleston on vocals. In 2020 and 2021, Karel co-wrote "Toast" performed by the Black Donnelys, "Flickering Life" and "Look In To the Light" for the Dorian Awards 2020 and 2021, the latter two performed by Morgan Mallory on the show.

=== Hosting ===
Bouley, along with his domestic partner, Andrew Lee Howard, started in radio at KYPA Los Angeles doing the weekend show "Different After Dark". They then did a morning program, "Good Morning Gay America". Professionally known as "Karel and Andrew", Bouley and Howard became the first openly gay radio talk-show hosts on a US major-market radio station with their move to KFI AM 640 in 1998.

In March 2000, "Karel & Andrew" was moved from the afternoon-drive slot into the evening-drive slot to accommodate the nationally syndicated Phil Hendrie Show. The show followed Hendrie's until April 2001 when the station again went through changes. Andrew Howard, who had AIDS, died unexpectedly of a pulmonary embolism on May 21, 2001.

Following his partner's death, Bouley returned to KFI and hosted a talk show there until station management changed and he and others were dismissed in April 2002. Seven months later, Karel was hired as an on-air host by San Francisco radio station KGO for the weekend evening time slot.

Bouley hosted a Free Speech TV series called Life in Segments, described as a "reality talk show", in 2014. In 2020 and 2021, Karel hosted the Dorian Awards both film and television awards.

=== Books ===
In 2004, Bouley authored a book of essays titled, You Can't Say That. The book was published by the LGBT publishing house, Alyson Press. Karel also contributed to "When I Knew" by Robert Trachtenberg, stories of "coming out" directed at Gay and Lesbian youth. Bouley's second book, Shouting at Windmills, BS From Bush to Obama was released in June 2011

== Appellate court battle ==
Following the sudden death of his domestic partner, Andrew Howard, in 2001, Bouley went on to file and win a lawsuit in the Court of Appeal of the State of California in Los Angeles County to establish the rights of domestic partners to be recognized as such and giving them the right to sue for wrongful death. This decision, handed down in 2005, meant that domestic partnerships were retroactively recognized in the State of California.

== Controversy ==
In November 2008, while Bouley was hosting on KGO, a sound engineer failed to mute Bouley's microphone during the national news break. When a reference to Joe the Plumber came up during the news, Bouley was heard on-air ranting: "Fuck goddamn Joe the goddamn mother-fucking Plumber. I want mother-fucking Joe the Plumber dead." KGO issued a news release on November 11, 2008, stating that he had been terminated. He was then rehired by KGO in 2010 and remained until 2015.
