= Bill Ballance =

American radio host (1918–2004)

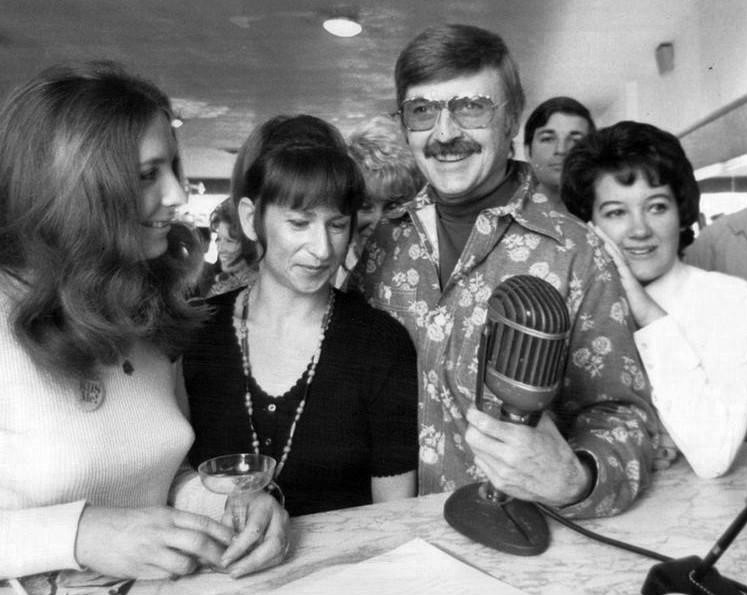
- Ballance broadcasting his Feminine Forum radio show, 1972.
- Born: Willis Bennett Ballance; October 27, 1918; Peoria, Illinois
- Died: September 23, 2004 (aged 85)
- Occupation: Radio talk show host

Willis Bennett Ballance (October 27, 1918 – September 23, 2004) was an American radio talk show host.

Ballance was born in Peoria, Illinois, and studied journalism at the University of Illinois before serving in the United States Marines. He had radio station stints in Denver, Los Angeles, San Francisco, Honolulu and San Diego. In the early 1950s his "Ballance of the Night" hosted celebrities on KNX in Los Angeles. Ballance was the evening Top 40 personality in the late 1950s to early '60s on #1-rated KFWB in Los Angeles.

In 1971, Ballance’s “Feminine Forum” radio show was launched on KGBS in L.A. The provocative show became one of the top rated shows in L.A. He is known as the forerunner to "shock jocks" like Tom Leykis and Howard Stern, having been accused of exploiting women's rights activists who called in to his show.

The Feminine Forum was dropped in 1973, and he began the Bill Ballance Show. He left Los Angeles in 1978 and went to KFMB in San Diego, where he remained for fifteen years. While his early years in San Diego were successful from a ratings standpoint, his core audience was much smaller than what he had in Los Angeles. Ballance continued his practice of mixing open-topic callers with various in-studio guests (psychologists like Vince and Sally Huntington, counselors, physicians, etc.), as well as his own hand-written monologues. By the late 1980s, however, his popularity began to wane. As other talk show hosts copied and changed the "shock jock" format, and as the format itself began to evolve into racier topics and discussions, the "Bill Ballance Show" began to seem tame by comparison. He retired from radio in 1993, after more than 50 years in the industry.

Ballance caused another stir in 1998, when a judge ruled that nude images of Dr. Laura Schlessinger could continue to be posted on a website. Ballance had sold the pictures to Internet Entertainment Group for $50,000.00 because he had been snubbed by Schlessinger at a Beverly Hills luncheon honoring her. He claimed that they were the product of a 1970s affair between himself and Schlessinger, while Schlessinger was married. Schlessinger admitted the affair but claimed she was legally separated and had filed for divorce from her first husband at the time of their affair. Ballance was 28 years older than Schlessinger.

Ballance appeared on television in the episode "Lover's Quarrel" of the 1973 ABC situation comedy A Touch of Grace, playing himself. Ballance also appeared in the 1975 Barnaby Jones episode "Fatal Witness" as fictional talk show host Bill Edwards.

After undergoing quadruple bypass surgery and suffering a stroke in June 2002, Ballance died on September 23, 2004.

== See also ==
- KKSF§California Girls, a 1971 provocative radio show
