= Doug McIntyre =

American radio host (born 1957)

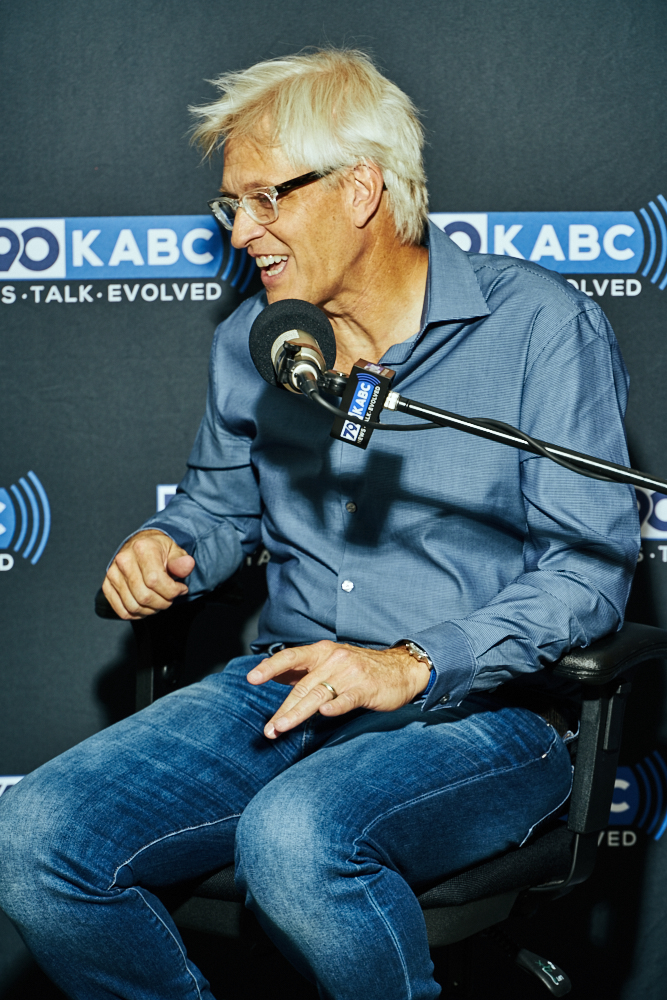
- McIntyre at the KABC radio studios in Los Angeles, 2017.
- Born: Douglas John McIntyre; November 11, 1957 (age 68); Great Neck, New York, U.S.
- Occupations: Novelist, radio Show Host, television producer, writer, columnist
- Spouse: Penny Peyser (m. 2002)
- Website: dougmcintyre.com

Douglas John McIntyre (born November 11, 1957) is the former host of McIntyre In The Morning, a talk show on KABC 790 Los Angeles. He retired after 22 years in broadcasting on December 14, 2018. McIntyre is a long-time columnist for the Southern California News Group which includes the Los Angeles Daily News. He is the author of Frank's Shadow, his debut novel, published in July, 2023.

Known for his active involvement in local politics and his passion for jazz and the Great American Songbook, McIntyre's background includes work as television writer-producer with credits including Married... with Children, The New WKRP in Cincinnati, Full House, Mike Hammer, and the critically acclaimed PBS series, Liberty's Kids, which earned McIntyre a Humanitas Prize nomination. With his wife, actress Penny Peyser, McIntyre wrote, produced, and directed the feature-length documentary film, Trying to Get Good: The Jazz Odyssey of Jack Sheldon, released in 2008. Doug is executive producer of Penny Peyser's 2016 feature documentary, Stillpoint. In 2023, McIntyre began doing occasional guest hosting on KFI radio in Los Angeles.

McIntyre is a frequent master of ceremonies, having performed on stage with Trevor Noah, Goldie Hawn, Jane Fonda, Lily Tomlin, Misty Copeland, Robert Redford, Jay Leno, Betty White, Ron Howard, John Cleese, and Steve Martin as part of the California Distinguished Speakers Series. He also hosted Tony Bennett in conversation at the Landmark Theater in West Los Angeles and was master of ceremonies for the 50th and 51st Cinema Audio Society Awards at the Biltmore Hotel, as well as a three-time host of the annual Los Angeles Political Roast.

== Career ==
=== Radio ===
After four years hosting KABC's overnight show Red Eye Radio, McIntyre inherited the morning drive position when veteran host Ken Minyard retired in October 2004. On September 24, 2009, McIntyre announced that he was leaving effective the end of the day's broadcast.

Beginning May 8, 2011, he hosted Doug McIntyre's Red Eye Radio which was broadcast on flagship station 770 WABC in New York, as well as 100 other stations across the country. On December 9, 2011, it was announced that he would be returning to KABC, Los Angeles, to host a new morning drive show, McIntyre In The Morning, effective January 3, 2012. McIntyre was teamed with former KFI afternoon news anchor Terri-Rae Elmer. Elmer exited the program in December 2016. McIntyre was joined by Leeann Tweeden in February 2017. In November of that year, McIntyre and Tweeden broke the Senator Al Franken story that resulted, ultimately, in Franken's resignation from the United States Senate. In December 2018, McIntyre announced that he would be leaving KABC. His final program was December 14.

=== Television ===
McIntyre is a frequent television guest. He has appeared on Lou Dobbs Tonight, Bill Maher's Politically Incorrect, Planet Green's Supper Club with Tom Bergeron, and HBO's Real Time with Bill Maher. McIntyre appeared on The History Channel, as well as Fox News Channel's The O'Reilly Factor and Hannity & Colmes. He hosted his own segment on CNBC's The Dennis Miller Show. McIntyre also wrote episodes of Married... with Children, Full House, The New WKRP in Cincinnati. and was co-executive producer of the mid-80s Mickey Spillane's Mike Hammer series.

=== Newspaper ===
McIntyre writes a weekly column for the Los Angeles Daily News, which appears every Sunday. He has also written for the Los Angeles Times, as well as The Daily Beast, American History Illustrated, and LA Jazz Scene. An amateur historian, McIntyre is an expert on the Wright brothers.

=== Film ===
McIntyre and his wife, actress Penny Peyser, wrote, produced, and directed Trying to Get Good: The Jazz Odyssey of Jack Sheldon (2008), a feature-length documentary film of Jack Sheldon. It won Jury Prizes at the Newport Beach Film Festival and at the Kansas City Film Makers Jubilee, and won Audience Prizes at Newport Beach and the Indianapolis International Film Festival. It also won an audience prize at the prestigious Nashville International Film Festival.

== Frank's Shadow ==
McIntyre's debut novel, Frank's Shadow was published by the Greenleaf Book Group of Austin, Texas, in July, 2023. The novel, set in 1998, is the story of Danny McKenna, a troubled 40-year-old history professor who must confront an uncomfortable reality. When his Irish immigrant Greatest Generation father dies on the same day as Danny's hero, Frank Sinatra, Danny is tasked with his dad's eulogy. While Danny knows everything about the famous singer, he knows almost nothing about his own withdrawn father. McKenna sets out to discover who his father really was, battling his own demons along the way, before uncovering his father's deepest, darkest secret from World War II. BookLife by Publishers Weekly called Frank's Shadow, "A triumph of dramatic literature." Indies Today review said, "A brilliant character study and an example of thunderous storytelling." The book won first place in the literary fiction category at the Spring 2024 BookFest Awards. A paperback edition was published in June, 2025 by River Grove Books.

== Personal life ==
McIntyre grew up in Great Neck, New York, and is a graduate of Stonehill College. He is the stepfather of two sons, by wife Peyser, one of whom was a helicopter pilot in the U.S. Army.

== Awards and recognition ==
Doug McIntyre won the Best Columnist award in 2011 from the California Association of Newspaper Publishers for his work in the Los Angeles Daily News. He was also awarded Outstanding Alumnus by his alma mater, Stonehill College, in 2010. For the PBS series Liberty's Kids, Doug earned a Humanitas Prize nomination for excellence in television writing. McIntyre has also been ranked one of the Top 40 radio hosts in the nation by the radio industry journal, Talkers Magazine. Year after year, McIntyre has been selected by his peers as one of the "most popular" and "most admired hosts" in the annual LARadio.com poll.
