= KABC (AM) =

- Los Angeles, California; United States
- Broadcast area: Greater Los Angeles Area
- Frequency: 790 kHz
- Branding: 790 KABC

Programming
- Format: Talk radio
- Affiliations: Premiere Networks; Westwood One Sports; San Francisco 49ers; UCLA Bruins; KABC-TV

Ownership
- Owner: Cumulus Media; (Radio License Holdings LLC)

History
- First air date: August 1925
- Former call signs: KFXB (1925–1927); KPLA (1927–1929); KECA (1929–1954)
- Former frequencies: 1430 kHz (1927–1939); 780 kHz (1939–1941)
- Call sign meaning: Formerly owned by the American Broadcasting Company

Technical information
- Licensing authority: FCC
- Facility ID: 33254
- Class: B
- Power: 6,600 watts (day); 7,900 watts (night)
- Transmitter coordinates: 34°1′10″N 118°20′47.3″W

Links
- Public license information: Public file; LMS
- Webcast: Listen live; Listen live; Listen live (via iHeartRadio)
- Website: kabc.com

KABC (790 AM) is a commercial radio station licensed to Los Angeles, California, United States, and serving the Greater Los Angeles area. The station is owned by Cumulus Media and broadcasts a conservative talk radio format. The studios are located in the Los Angeles suburb of Culver City. The transmitter is off West Martin Luther King Boulevard in the Crenshaw District, shared with KWKW (1330 AM) and KFOX (1650 AM).

Prior to 2007, KABC served as the West Coast flagship for the ABC Radio Network, and was one of the first stations in the United States to feature a talk format on a full-time basis. Sold to Citadel Broadcasting in 2007, it has been under Cumulus ownership since 2011 and currently carries a mostly syndicated lineup of talk shows. UCLA Bruins sports air on some weekends.

== History ==
=== Early years ===
The station first signed on in August 1925. The original call sign was KFXB, licensed to Big Bear Lake, California, and broadcasting at 1430 kHz. KFXB moved to Los Angeles in 1927, changing its call letters to KPLA in the process.

On November 15, 1929, KPLA was sold to Earle C. Anthony, a Packard automobile dealer and owner of rival radio station KFI. Anthony changed KPLA's call letters to KECA, representing Anthony's initials. KECA and KFI were located in studios at 1000 Hope Street. KFI, then and now, transmitted with 50,000 watts, while KECA broadcast at 1,000 watts.

In August 1939, Anthony purchased KEHE (780 kHz, formerly KTM) and took that station off the air so he could relocate KECA to that station's frequency. In 1941, KECA moved one step up the dial to 790 kHz as part of the North American Regional Broadcasting Agreement (NARBA), which shifted the frequencies of many radio stations. The power was increased to 5,000 watts, with a directional antenna used at night.

=== ABC buys 790 ===
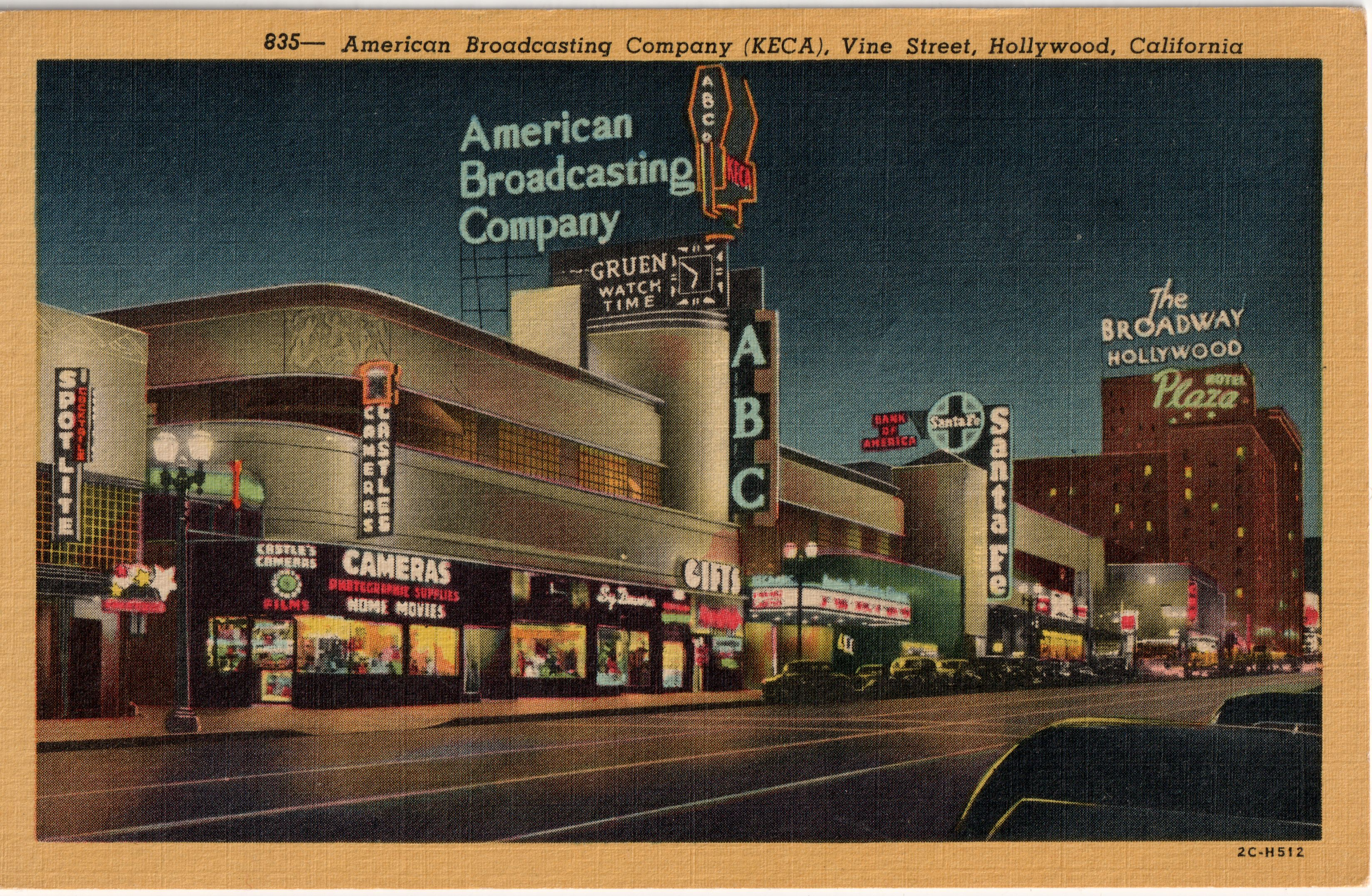
ABC radio and television KECA in about the 1950s

In 1944, new Federal Communications Commission (FCC) rules went into effect prohibiting any person or company from owning more than one radio station in the same media market. Anthony decided to keep KFI, and divested KECA to the Blue Network for $800,000 in July 1944; the FCC approved the transfer on July 18. The studios and offices were then moved to 1440 North Highland Avenue in Hollywood. (A Chick-fil-A restaurant now stands on the site.)

KECA became the West Coast flagship station of the American Broadcasting Company (ABC) network. Some of the programs broadcast nationally by ABC originated in the KABC studios. In 1947, an FM station was added at 95.5 MHz. At first, KECA-FM transmitted with 4,500 watts and it largely simulcast the AM station; in 1971, it became album rock station KLOS.

In 1949, ABC put KECA-TV (channel 7) on the air. It was the last of Los Angeles' six original VHF television stations to sign on and the last of ABC's five original owned-and-operated stations to go on the air. To reflect their corporate ownership, in 1954, the call letters for the three ABC stations were changed to KABC, KABC-FM, and KABC-TV, after that call sign was released by a station in San Antonio. The studios for KABC-AM-FM-TV were at 1539 North Vine Street in Hollywood. The radio stations later moved to 3321 La Cienega Boulevard, where the AM station transmitter and towers had been located since 1938.

=== Pioneering talk radio ===
KABC became a pioneer of the talk radio format, going "all-talk" around the clock, in September 1960. It was the second radio station to make a 24-hour commitment to the format, a few months after CBS-owned KMOX in St. Louis. Through the 1970s, on into the early 1980s, KABC was frequently Los Angeles' top radio station, and among the most listened-to radio stations in America. In the 1961–1962 edition of Broadcasting Yearbook, an advertisement shows a KABC microphone, the headline reading "Here's Los Angeles' Conversation Piece" and stating KABC's talk programming is "newsworthy, stimulating and provocative".

Along with co-owned KGO in San Francisco, ABC built a nationally syndicated radio network around the personalities of the two top-rated West Coast talk outlets. The ABC TalkRadio Network featured KABC personalities Michael Jackson who hosted middays, psychologist Dr. Toni Grant in afternoons, and Ira Fistel and Ray Briem at night. The network was heard on scores of radio stations around the country, including co-owned WABC in New York City. The station has also served as the home of psychiatrist David Viscott and early talk radio pioneers Joe Pyne and Louis Lomax. In 1992, KABC hired its first African American woman news anchor, Yolanda L. Gaskins. Two former KABC hosts, Dennis Prager and Larry Elder, were later syndicated on the Salem Radio Network; Prager is still heard on its Los Angeles station KRLA.

The talk radio duo John and Ken (John Chester Kobylt and Kenneth Robertson Chiampou) came over to KABC to host mornings after they were released from the afternoon show on KFI. Their KABC stint lasted from July 1, 1999, to October 20, 2000. They later returned to afternoons on KFI.

=== Changes in ownership ===
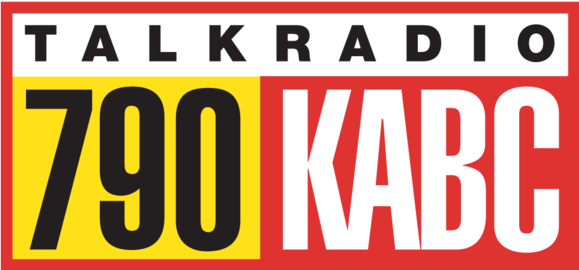
Logo for KABC until 2016.

Capital Cities/ABC was acquired by The Walt Disney Company in 1996. Disney sold off its radio division to Citadel Broadcasting in 2006. Citadel later merged with Cumulus Media on September 16, 2011. After Cumulus Broadcasting took over, airborne traffic reporter Jorge Jarrín, son of Los Angeles Dodgers Spanish-language broadcaster Jaime Jarrín, was let go after 26 years. Also fired were imaging voice Howard Hoffman and news director/morning newscaster Mark Austin Thomas, who joined KNX.

A lawsuit alleged that school employees of Academia Semillas del Pueblo (ASDP) received death threats, and that the school was the target of a bomb threat, because of Doug McIntyre's extensive on-air criticism of the school, in which he accused ASDP of espousing a racist and separatist anti-American philosophy. The suit was dismissed in January 2008.

On March 31, 2016, KABC was granted an FCC construction permit to move to the same transmitter site as the one used by KWKW; the daytime power would increase to 6,600 watts and nighttime power would be raised to 6,800 watts. An application to modify this construction permit the following February increased the night power to 7,900 watts.

As of August 2018, KABC was the 40th-ranked station in the market in a 50-station survey, tied with Persian language station KIRN; in intervening years Cumulus stopped reporting KABC's ratings for services that made their rankings public. Jillian Barberie, Drew Pinsky, Leeann Tweeden, and Peter Tilden were all dismissed at the end of 2019 as KABC changed to an all-syndicated talk lineup; John Phillips, Randy Wang, and Larry O'Connor (from WMAL-FM in Washington, D.C.) were the lone local hosts retained.

=== Sports ===
From 1974 to 1997, KABC was the flagship station of the Los Angeles Dodgers and their hall-of-fame broadcaster Vin Scully. After some years on KFWB, the team returned to KABC in 2008. On September 28, 2011, the final Dodgers baseball game was broadcast on KABC from Chase Field in Phoenix. The games moved to KLAC for the 2012 season. In August 2014, KABC became the flagship radio station of the Los Angeles Kings hockey team; that arrangement ended in 2018, with the games switching to KEIB. The LA Galaxy soccer team also had its games on KABC, later moving to ESPN Radio-owned KSPN. Los Angeles Lakers games were also previously broadcast.

KABC aired USC Trojans football and men's basketball games during the 1970s. On May 2, 2019, the University of Southern California (USC) announced play-by-play coverage of its football and men's basketball teams would return to KABC. In August 2025, the University of California, Los Angeles (UCLA) announced that UCLA Bruins sports would move to KABC from KLAC; the station primarily airs UCLA Bruins football and men's basketball, along with select women's basketball games.
