= List of California State University, Long Beach people =

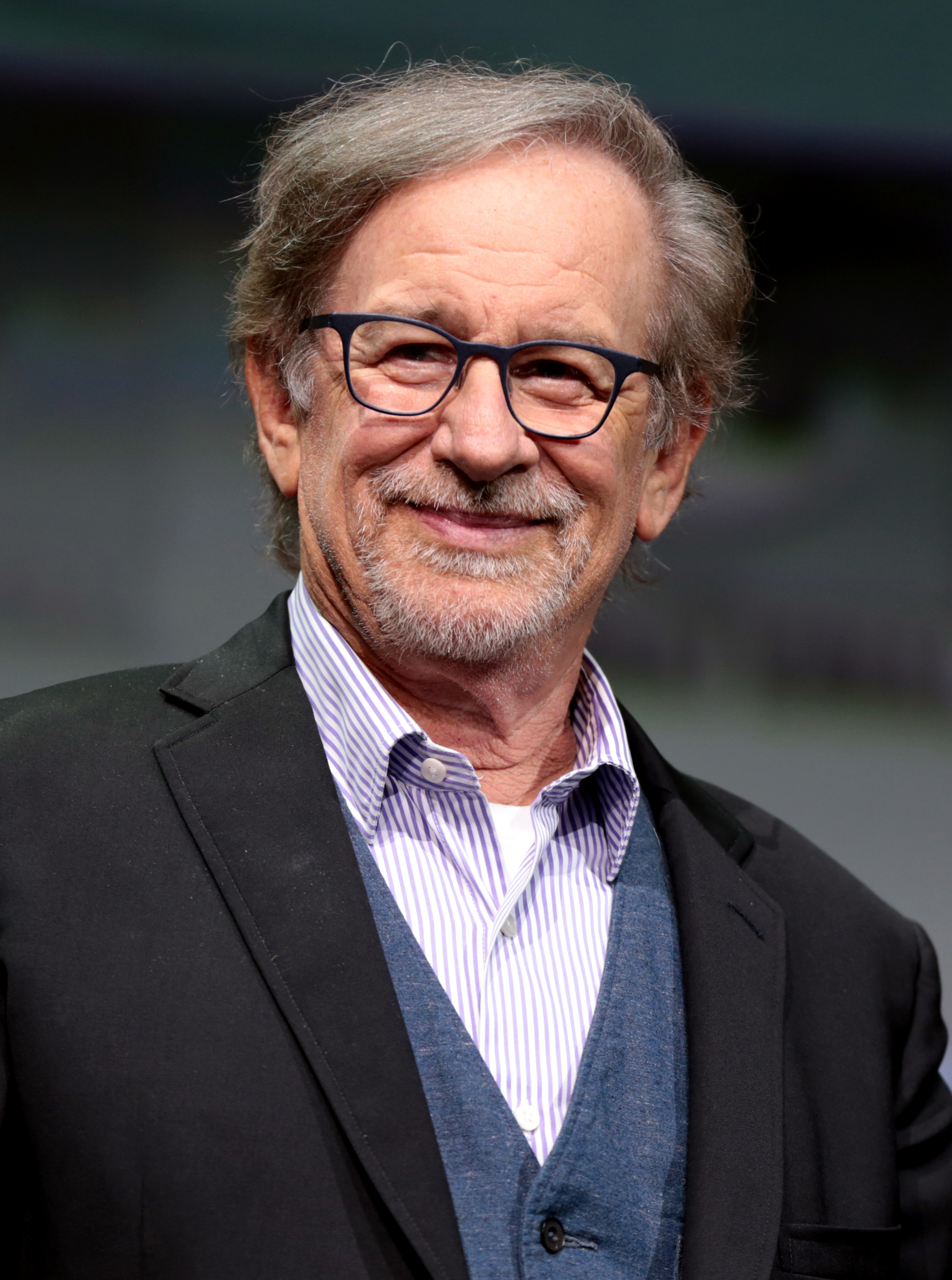
Steven Spielberg

The following is a list of notable people associated with California State University, Long Beach. CSULB has more than 320,000 alumni as of 2018.

== Alumni ==
=== Entertainment ===
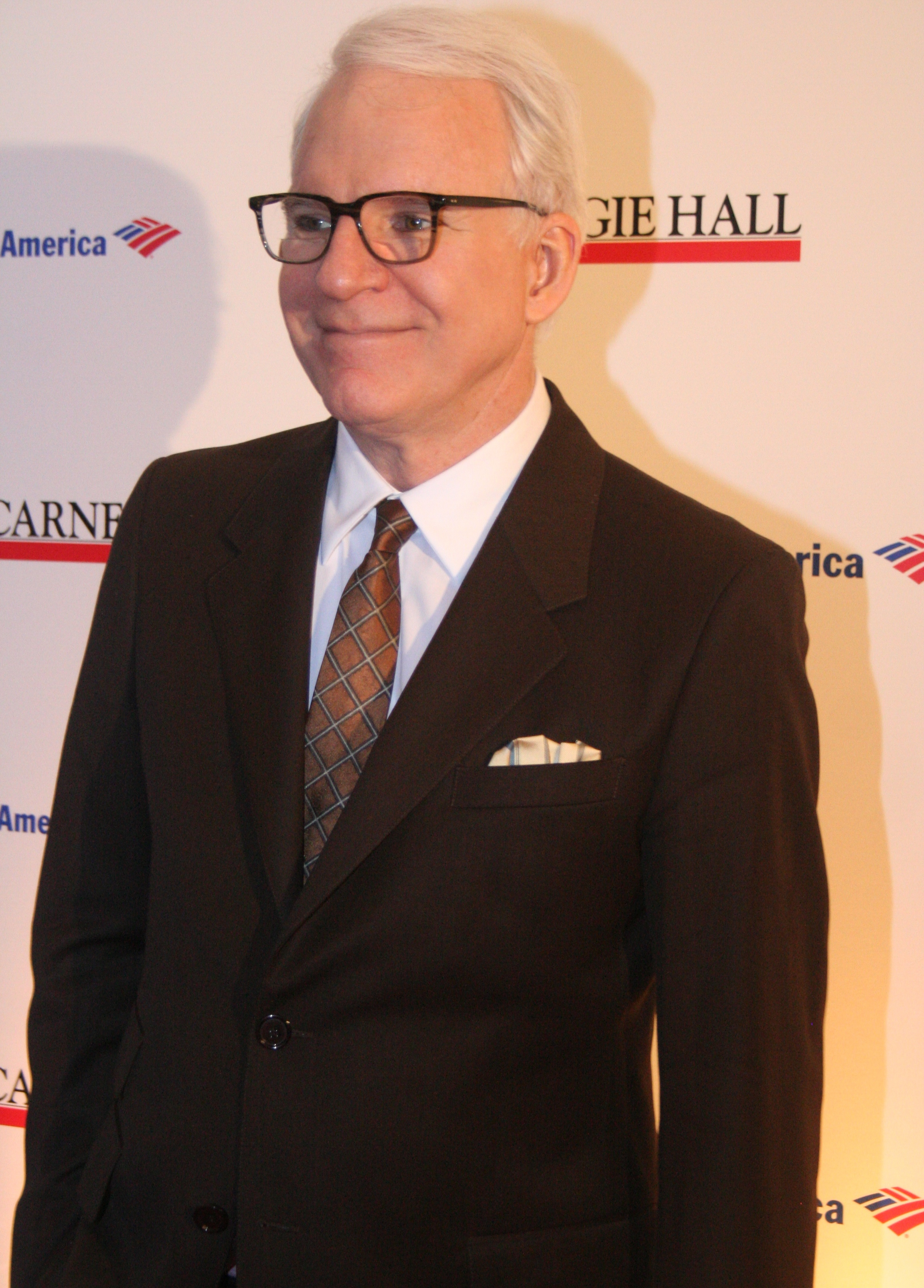
Steve Martin

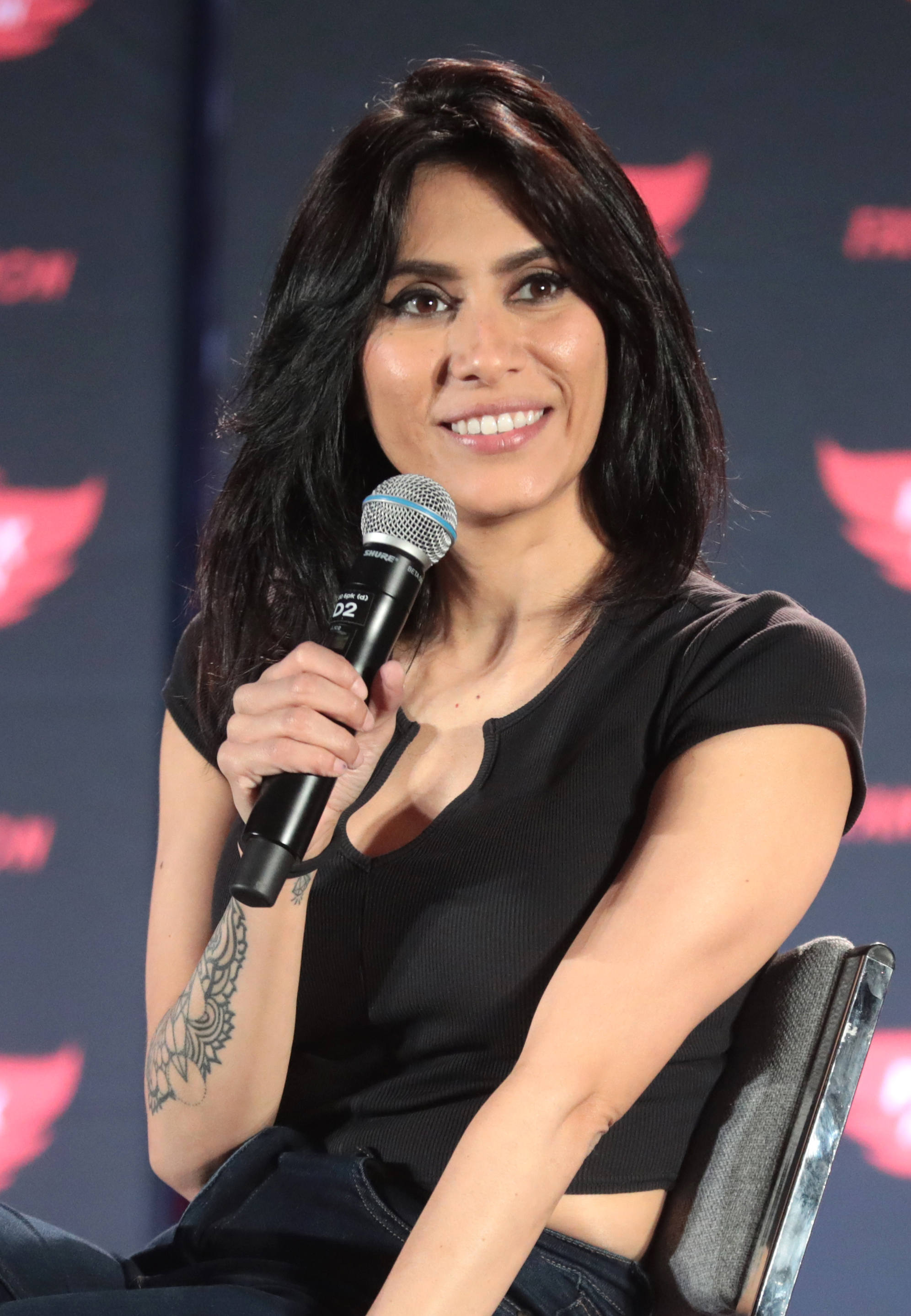
Cristina Vee

- Millicent Borges Accardi: poet and writer, NEA winner
- Paul "Coy" Allen: television director, Sam & Cat; television producer, R&B Divas: Atlanta, R&B Divas: Los Angeles; music video director
- Richard Bach: fiction and nonfiction author, Jonathan Livingston Seagull
- Tony Baxter: Disney Imagineering executive
- Guy Bee: director of ER
- Daniele Bolelli: author
- Jan Burke: mystery author, 2000 Edgar Award for Best Novel
- Bobby Burgess: actor and dancer on the TV shows Mickey Mouse Club (the original series), The Lawrence Welk Show, and The Donna Reed Show
- Chris Carter: creator and producer of the X-Files
- Agnes de Mille: award-winning choreographer, niece of Cecil B. DeMille
- John Dykstra: winner of two Academy Awards for special effects
- Jonathan Fahn: voice, TV, and film actor; film and stage director, producer, and writer
- Matt Gourley: actor and comedian; co-creator of Superego
- Donna Hilbert: poet and writer
- Mark Steven Johnson: director of Hollywood thriller Daredevil; writer of Grumpy Old Men and sequel Grumpier Old Men
- Joe Johnston: director of Jurassic Park III and Jumanji
- Bob Kevoian: radio host
- J. F. Lawton: author of Pretty Woman
- Raymond Lee: actor
- Steve Martin: actor and comedian
- Tim Minear: television writer and producer, X-Files, Angel, Firefly, Wonderfalls
- Manny Montana: actor, Good Girls
- Joon Park: singer and entertainer, member of South Korean group g.o.d
- John Roland: longtime reporter and anchor for WNYW in New York City 1969–2004
- Stu Rosen: winner of 10 Emmy awards
- Steve Ryan: author, game creator, syndicated puzzle columnist, TV game show historian and creator, Blockbusters
- Penelope Spheeris: film director, producer and screenwriter best known for Wayne's World and The Decline of Western Civilization trilogy
- Steven Spielberg: filmmaker, student 1965–1969 and 2001–2002
- David Twohy: author of Terminal Velocity and The Fugitive
- Cristina Vee: animation and video game voice actress
- Maitland Ward: actress, Boy Meets World
- Bill Wasserzieher (B.A. and M.A.): music and film critic, fiction writer
- Jessica Williams: comedian and correspondent on The Daily Show
- Stan Winston: special effects designer
- Bob Woods: actor, One Life to Live
- Linda Woolverton: screenwriter, Beauty and the Beast and The Lion King
- Jennifer Yuh Nelson: animation film director and storyboard artist

=== Music ===
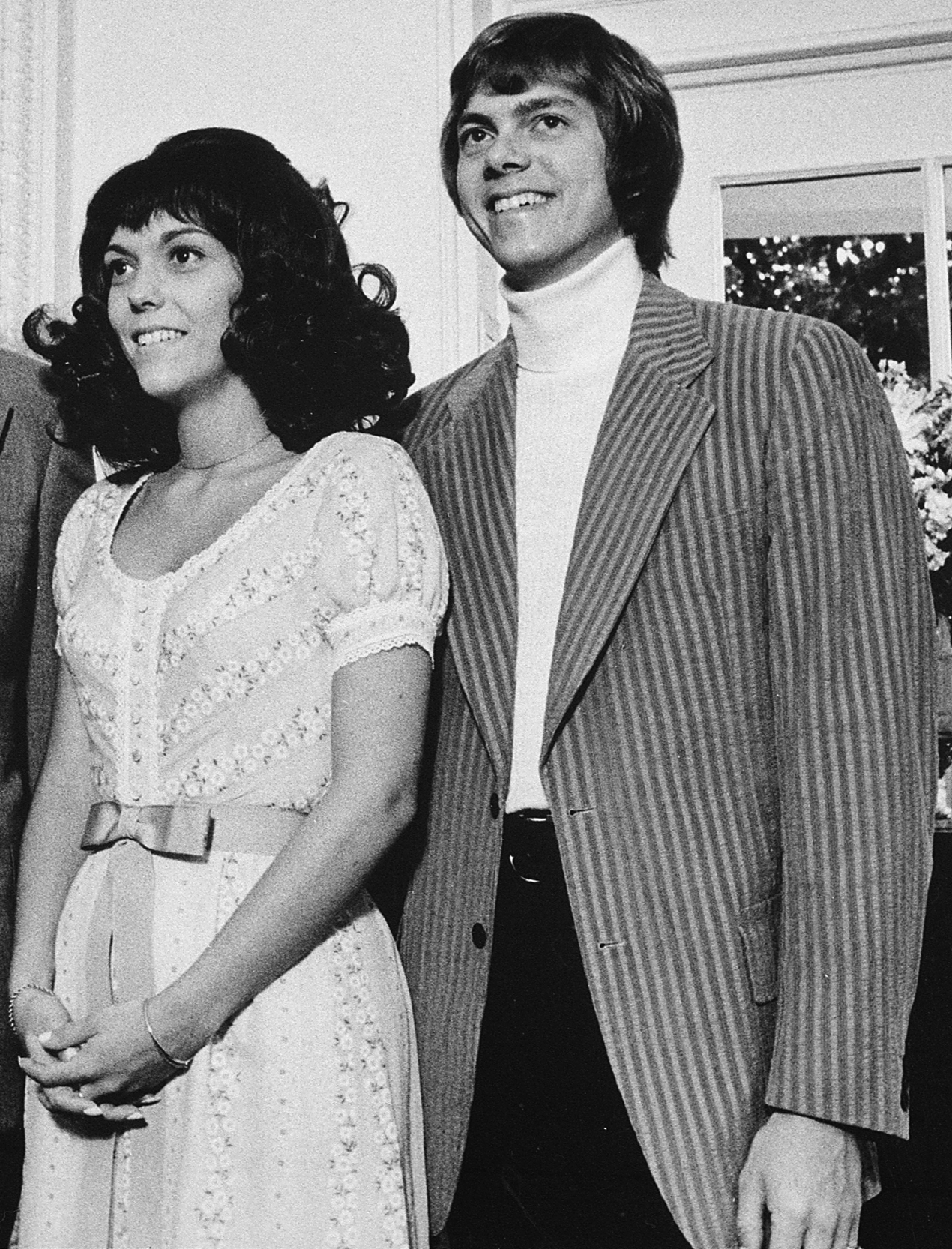
The Carpenters

- Dave Alvin: singer-songwriter: founder of The Blasters, former member of X
- Arleen Auger: opera singer
- John Bettis: songwriter, has 26 gold and 10 platinum records
- Larry Carlton: jazz fusion guitarist
- Richard and Karen Carpenter: The Carpenters, pop duo
- Melissa Hasin: cellist
- Bobby Hatfield: half of The Righteous Brothers and Rock 'n Roll Hall of Fame inductee
- Greg Kriesel: bass player for The Offspring
- Bill Medley: half of The Righteous Brothers
- Bradley Nowell: lead singer and guitarist of rock band Sublime
- Jae Park: member of the South Korean boy band Day6
- Joon Park: member of the South Korean boy band g.o.d
- John Patitucci: Grammy Award-winning jazz bassist
- Basil Poledouris: film composer
- Jenni Rivera: singer-songwriter
- Mark Turner: jazz saxophonist
- Heather Youmans: singer-songwriter
- Tóc Tiên: Vietnamese singer

=== Government and politics ===
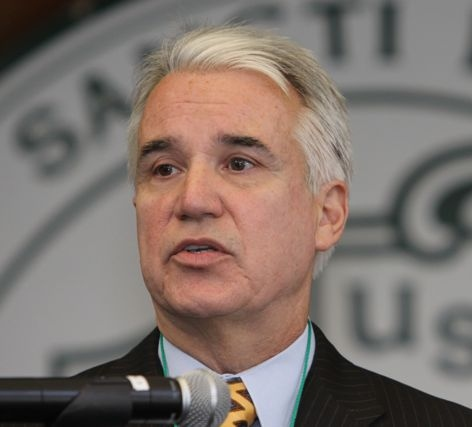
George Gascón

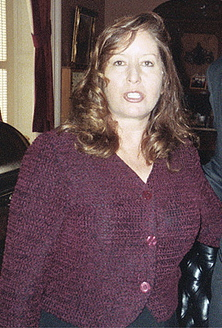
Gloria J. Romero

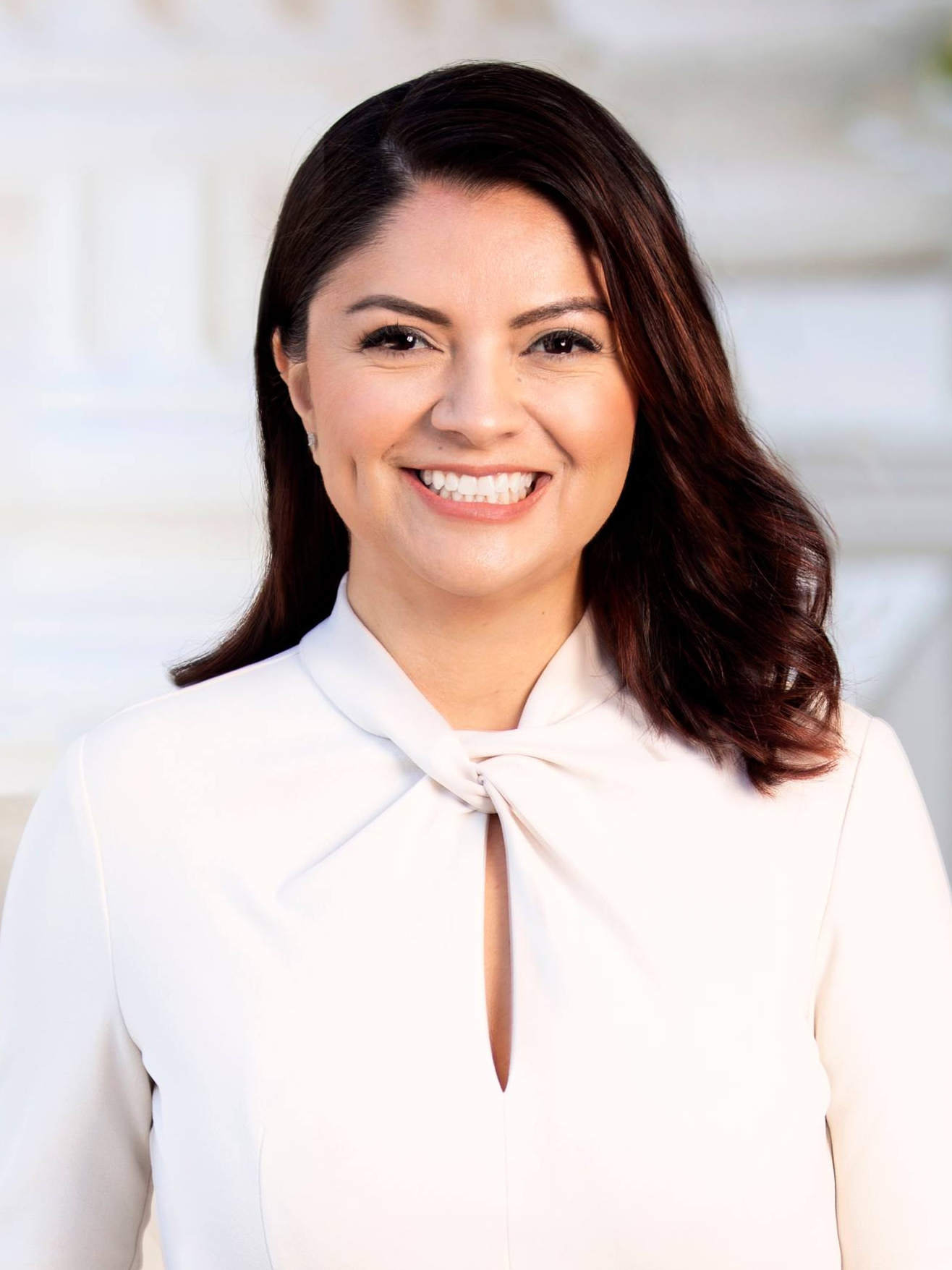
Lena Gonzalez

- Kathy Augustine (M.P.A.): Nevada State Controller (1999–2006)
- Patricia Bates (B.S.): serving in the California State Senate
- Ian Calderon (B.A. 2008): member of the California State Assembly
- Debbie Cook (B.S.): mayor of Huntington Beach
- Kevin Drum (B.A. 1981): political blogger and columnist
- Robert Garcia (B.A. 2002): U.S. congressman and former mayor of Long Beach
- George Gascón (B.A. 1977): Los Angeles County district attorney, former district attorney of San Francisco, former police chief
- Brad Gates (B.S., M.S.): 11th sheriff of Orange County, California
- Lena Gonzalez (B.A.): serving in the California State Senate
- Eklil Ahmad Hakimi (M.S. 1998): former Deputy Minister of Foreign Affairs of Afghanistan
- Tim Leslie (M.P.A.): California state senator
- Kevin McCarty (B.A.): mayor of Sacramento
- John Moorlach (B.A. 1977): California state senator
- Patrick O'Donnell (B.A., M.P.A.): member of the California State Assembly
- Jenny Oropeza (B.S.): California state senator
- Curt Pringle (B.A., M.P.A.): speaker of the California State Assembly and mayor of Anaheim
- Dana Rohrabacher (B.A. 1969): United States congressman
- Gloria Romero (B.A., M.A.): California state senate majority leader
- Wade Sanders: deputy assistant United States Secretary of the Navy for Reserve Affairs and convicted sex offender
- John G. Schmitz (M.A. 1960): United States congressman and 1972 American Independent Party candidate for president of the United States
- Kelly Seyarto (M.P.A.): member of the California State Assembly
- Edward Ulloa (B.A.): attorney and former criminal prosecutor

=== Sports ===
- Guy Baker: head coach of the USA Women's water polo team; led the team to three consecutive Olympic medal ceremonies (silver 2000; bronze 2004; silver 2008)
- Gil Castillo: amateur wrestler; retired MMA fighter
- Amber Corwin: figure skater and costume designer
- Paul Goydos: PGA golfer
- John Mallinger: PGA golfer
- Pat McCormick: four-time Olympic gold medalist, won both the platform and springboard events, in both (1952 and 1956)
- Mark O'Meara: champion golfer
- Tim Shaw: Olympic silver medalist 1976 and 1984 (water polo), Sullivan Award Winner
- Dwight Stones: two-time Olympic high jump bronze medalist (1972 and 1976); sports commentator

==== Baseball ====
- Abe Alvarez: pitcher, Palfinger Reggio Emilia (Italy)
- John Bowker: first baseman, San Francisco Giants
- Brent Cookson: retired outfielder, Kansas City Royals and Los Angeles Dodgers
- Mark Cresse: bullpen coach for the Los Angeles Dodgers
- Bobby Crosby: shortstop, Pittsburgh Pirates
- Matt Duffy: infielder, Tampa Bay Rays
- Jarren Duran: outfielder, Boston Red Sox
- Danny Espinosa: second baseman, Washington Nationals
- Marco Estrada: pitcher, Toronto Blue Jays
- Mike Gallo: pitcher, MLB free agent
- Jason Giambi: retired first baseman, Colorado Rockies
- Chris Gomez: shortstop, MLB free agent
- Jared Hughes: retired pitcher, Pittsburgh Pirates
- Evan Longoria: third baseman, Tampa Bay Rays
- Paul McAnulty: outfielder, Los Angeles Angels of Anaheim
- Cesar Ramos: pitcher, Los Angeles Angels of Anaheim
- Jeremy Reed: outfielder, Toronto Blue Jays
- Termel Sledge: outfielder, played for Montreal Expos, Washington Nationals and San Diego Padres
- Steve Trachsel: pitcher, MLB free agent
- Troy Tulowitzki: shortstop, Toronto Blue Jays
- Jason Vargas: pitcher, Philadelphia Phillies
- Nick Vincent (born 1986): pitcher in the Philadelphia Phillies organization
- Jered Weaver: pitcher, Los Angeles Angels of Anaheim
- Vance Worley: pitcher, Baltimore Orioles

==== Basketball ====
- Andrew Betts: Charlotte Hornets 1998 draftee
- Deishuan Booker (born 1996): basketball player in the Israeli Basketball Premier League
- Cindy Brown: Olympic gold medalist (1988), ABL (Seattle Reign), and WNBA (Detroit Shock)
- James Ennis: Miami Heat
- George Gervin: leading scorer four times in a row with the San Antonio Spurs
- Lucious Harris: Dallas Mavericks, Philadelphia 76ers, New Jersey Nets, Cleveland Cavaliers
- Juaquin Hawkins: Houston Rockets
- Craig Hodges: Los Angeles Clippers, Los Angeles Lakers, Milwaukee Bucks, Phoenix Suns, Chicago Bulls 1991 and 92 NBA champion
- Gabe Levin (born 1994): American-Israeli basketball player in the Israeli Basketball Premier League
- Mike Montgomery: head coach, University of California, Berkeley
- Ed Ratleff: Houston Rockets, Olympic silver medalist (1972)
- Bryon Russell: Washington Wizards, Utah Jazz, Los Angeles Lakers, Denver Nuggets
- Jerry Tarkanian: coached Long Beach State 1968–1973, later at UNLV and Fresno State
- Chuck Terry: Milwaukee Bucks, San Antonio Spurs, New York Nets
- Penny Toler: first player to score a basket in the WNBA, head coach and general manager of the Los Angeles Sparks
- Michael Wiley: San Antonio Spurs
- Morlon Wiley: assistant coach, Orlando Magic; younger brother of Michael Wiley

==== American football ====
- George Allen: head coach, coach of the Washington Redskins, coached the Los Angeles Rams
- Russ Bolinger: NFL offensive lineman
- Willie Brown: NFL, NFL Hall of Fame Oakland Raiders' defensive back
- Dan Bunz: NFL, San Francisco 49ers' linebacker
- Terrell Davis: NFL, Denver Broncos' football running back
- Jim Fassel: former offensive coordinator of the NFL's Baltimore Ravens and former head coach of the New York Giants
- Steve Folsom: NFL tight end
- Jeff Graham: NFL quarterback
- Mike Horan: NFL, Denver Broncos' punter
- David Howard: NFL linebacker
- Lynn Hoyem: NFL offensive lineman
- Ron Johnson: football player
- Charles Lockett: NFL wide receiver
- Mike McCoy: Coach, San Diego Chargers
- Terry Metcalf: NFL, Arizona Cardinals' running back
- Dean Miraldi: NFL, offensive lineman
- Billy Parks: NFL, wide receiver
- Ben Rudolph: NFL, defensive lineman
- Mark Seay: NFL, San Diego Chargers' wide receiver
- Jeff Severson: NFL, safety

==== Rowing ====
- Joan Lind Van Blom: Olympic rower; silver medal in single sculls, 1976 Montreal; silver medal in coxed quad sculls, 1984 Los Angeles; first woman to receive Olympic medal in the sport for the US

==== Volleyball ====
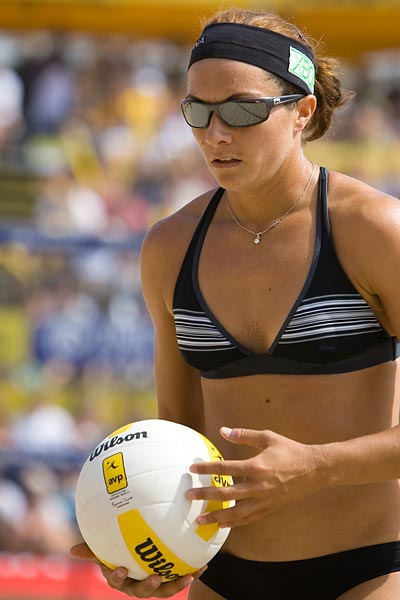
Misty May-Treanor

- Tara Cross-Battle: Olympic volleyball player
- Bob Ctvrtlik: Olympic gold medalist (1988), volleyball, IOC member
- Tayyiba Haneef-Park: Olympic silver medalist (2008), volleyball
- Brent Hilliard: head coach, University of San Diego, Olympic bronze medal (1992), Volleyball National Championship and NCAA Player of the Year (1992)
- Tom Hoff: Olympic gold medalist (2008), volleyball
- David Lee: Olympic gold medalist (2008), volleyball
- Misty May-Treanor: Olympic gold medalist (2004, 2008 and 2012), women's beach volleyball
- Danielle Scott-Arruda: Olympic silver medalist (2008), volleyball
- Scott Touzinsky: Olympic gold medalist (2008), volleyball

=== Visual arts ===
- Chris Bachalo: illustrator, DC and Marvel Comics (X-Men)
- John Cederquist (born 1946): sculptor, BA in 1969, MA in 1971
- Cathy Cooper: stylist, painter, model
- Helen Feyler-Switz: sculptor, painter, art instructor
- Alex Gardner (born 1987): figurative painter
- Roberta Gregory (born 1953): comic book writer
- Seonna Hong (born 1973; B.A. in art): painter
- Gerhardt Knodel (born 1940; M.F.A 1970): textile artist, installation artist, educator
- Gilbert "Magú" Luján (1940–2011; B.A. in art 1969): Chicano sculptor, muralist and painter
- Betye Saar (born 1926): assemblage artist
- Shag (Josh Agle; born 1962): painter and designer
- Greg Simkins (born 1979; B.A. in studio art): painter
- Mia Tavonatti (MFA in illustration): mosaic artist and writer
- Linda Vallejo (born 1951): artist known for painting, sculpture and ceramics

=== Journalism ===
- Scott Stantis: editorial cartoonist for The Chicago Tribune, creator of the comic strips The Buckets and Prickly City

=== Academics ===
- Erin Gruwell: inspiring teacher from Freedom Writers, the book and movie
- Robert W. Hillman: Distinguished Professor of Law Emeritus, University of California, Davis
- Robin Kelley: Distinguished Professor and Gary B. Nash Chair in U.S. History, University of California, Los Angeles
- Lee Mallory: poet, author and retired English professor at Santa Ana College
- Dennis J. Murray: president of Marist College
- John Sailhamer: academic and theologian

=== Other ===
- Andrew Berardini: writer, art critic, curator
- J. Jon Bruno: Episcopal bishop of Los Angeles
- Linda Burhansstipanov MSPH, DrPH: Cherokee Nation of Oklahoma member, public health educator and researcher focused on Native American cancer care and support
- Neil Campbell: biologist, author
- Ronald Chagoury: co-founder and CEO of the Chagoury Group
- Donna L. Crisp: U.S. Navy rear admiral
- Libby Gill: leadership speaker, executive coach and author
- Ken Hoang: professional Super Smash Bros. player, with the nickname "King of Smash"
- Palmer Luckey: creator of the Oculus Rift, ranked #26 on Forbes' 2015 list of America's richest entrepreneurs under 40
- Alex Meruelo: billionaire owner of the Meruelo Group, the Arizona Coyotes of the NHL, Fuji Food, multiple radio stations, casinos and Colom Island
- John Platt: Microsoft researcher, astronomer
- J. Warner Wallace: homicide detective and Christian apologist
- Laura Yeager: U.S. Army general

=== Fictional ===
- The character Alan Harper (Jon Cryer) on the sitcom Two and a Half Men graduated from CSULB. This was stated in the episode "The Salmon Under My Sweater".

== Faculty ==
- Phil Alvin: taught mathematics at CSULB; member of The Blasters band
- Xiaolan Bao: professor of history
- Vera Barstow: violinist and teacher
- Verne Carlson: taught cinematography, author and cinematographer
- August Coppola: professor of Comparative Literature
- Karla Diaz: school of art
- Fitzhugh Dodson: taught in the Psychology department from 1962
- Robert Eisenman: professor of Middle East Religions and Archaeology and director of the Institute for the Study of Judeo-Christian Origins at California State University, Long Beach; visiting senior member of Linacre College, Oxford University; expert on the Dead Sea Scrolls
- Karen L. Gould (born 1948): president of Brooklyn College
- Jack Green: professor of the Geological Sciences; a volcanologist and lunar planetary scientist
- Steve Horn: professor emeritus, former president of the university; 5-term former U.S. congressman
- Maulana Karenga: former head of Black Studies Dept., author and activist best known as the founder of the African-American holiday of Kwanzaa
- Alan Lowenthal: professor of community psychology, state senator
- Kevin MacDonald: evolutionary psychologist professor, anti-semitic conspiracy theorist, white supremacist
- Ilan Mitchell-Smith: English professor, former child actor
- Clifton Snider: poet, novelist, literary critic specializing in Jungian and queer criticism
- Shira Tarrant: author and cultural critic; Women's, Gender, and Sexuality Studies Department
