= K-Day =

K-Day or KDAY may refer to:

== Radio stations ==
- KDAY, in Greater Los Angeles, U.S.
  - KDEY-FM, a simulcast
- KSRW (FM), in Independence, California, U.S., formerly KDAY-FM 1991–2004
- KBLA, in Santa Monica, California, U.S., formerly KDAY 1956–1991

== Other uses ==
- K-Day, a military designation of days and hours
- K-Day, an annual event at Michigan Technological University
- K-Days, an annual exhibition in Edmonton, Alberta, Canada
- Dayton International Airport, ICAO code KDAY
