= KPWR =

Rhythmic hot adult contemporary radio station in Los Angeles

Coordinates: 34.227°N 118.068°W

- Los Angeles, California; United States
- Broadcast area: Greater Los Angeles
- Frequency: 105.9 MHz (HD Radio)
- Branding: Power 106 (pronounced "Power One-Oh-Six")

Programming
- Language: English
- Format: Rhythmic hot AC

Ownership
- Owner: Alex Meruelo; (KPWR Radio Holdings LLC)
- Sister stations: Radio: KDAY; KDEY-FM; KLLI; KLOS; TV: KWHY

History
- Former call signs: KBMS (1955–1969); KWST (1969–1982); KMGG (1982–1986)
- Call sign meaning: Power

Technical information
- Licensing authority: FCC
- Facility ID: 35498
- Class: B
- ERP: 25,000 watts
- HAAT: 925 meters (3,035 ft)

Links
- Public license information: Public file; LMS
- Webcast: Listen live; Listen live (via iHeartRadio)
- Website: power106.com

KPWR (105.9 FM) – branded as Power 106 – is a commercial radio station in Los Angeles, California, broadcasting to the Greater Los Angeles area. KPWR is owned and operated by Alex Meruelo's Meruelo Group, through licensee KPWR Radio Holdings LLC, and airs a rhythmic hot AC format. KPWR's studios are based in the Los Angeles suburb of Burbank, and the transmitter is on Mount Wilson. Meruelo acquired KPWR from Emmis Communications for $82.75 million in May 2017, officially bringing the station under common ownership with KDAY, KDEY-FM and KBEH on August 1, 2017.

== History ==
=== Early years (1955–1986) ===
From 1946 until its deletion in 1951, 105.9 MHz in Los Angeles was occupied by KFI-FM. In 1955, Planned Music, Inc. applied for a construction permit for a new station on the vacated frequency, which was assigned the call letters KBMS (Better Music Station), before adopting the KWST call sign and "K-West 106" moniker in 1969. During its years as KBMS and KWST, its format had been beautiful music prior to its flip to a progressive rock format on January 1, 1975. K-West emulated the then-popular sound of KMET and KLOS. By 1981, though, the ratings had slipped and KWST had changed to a top 40 format, and fired all of their disc jockeys. KWST eventually evolved into KMGG, "Magic 106", playing upbeat adult contemporary music beginning in mid-1982.

In May 1984, Century Broadcasting sold KMGG and St. Louis' KSHE to the Indianapolis-based Emmis Communications.

=== KPWR — Power 106 (1986–present) ===
Not too long after Emmis bought KMGG, it immediately saw a niche to counter top 40 stations KIIS and KKHR and urban outlet KDAY, KJLH, and KACE (the latter three all signal challenged). On January 11, 1986 at 6 p.m., KMGG dropped its adult contemporary format and became the first-ever rhythmic contemporary-formatted radio station with new call sign KPWR and branding "Power 106". The first song on the newly christened "Power 106" was "Say I'm Your Number One" by Princess. Jay Thomas was hired as the host of "The Power 106 Morning Zoo". Power 106's first slogans in 1986 were "Turn on the Fresh New Music Mix", and "I've Made the Power Switch". These were then followed in 1987 with "Pure Energy...Dance Now", in 1991 with "L.A.'s Hottest Music", in 1997 as "L.A.'s Party Station", in 2005 with "Where Hip-Hop Lives", and most recently, "L.A.'s #1 for Hip-Hop" in 2017.

At the time of KPWR's launch, it broadcast what it announced as "72,000 Watts of Music Power...Less Talk" (mentioned in on-air station identifications by Chuck Riley and Deborah Rath), a reference to its then-actual effective radiated power (ERP) of 72 kW, allowing its signal to be heard in San Diego, Kern, and Santa Barbara counties). KPWR's ERP was reduced to 25 kW in 1993.

KPWR picked up additional competition in May 2005 when KXOL-FM dropped its Spanish adult contemporary format for a Hispanic rhythmic, or hurban, format known as "Latino 96.3". The format is a crossover mix of reggaeton, dancehall, R&B, and hip hop targeting a bilingual audience. However, the abrupt switch violated a transmitter lease agreement that KXOL's parent company, Spanish Broadcasting System (SBS), had with Emmis; the agreement required formal notification to Emmis of any change in format and expressly prohibited KXOL from programming to directly compete with KPWR. SBS switched formats anyway, and Emmis filed a lawsuit to force SBS to either drop the format switch or find a new transmitter. SBS announced that KXOL would move to another transmitter site a month later, and both parties settled the dispute sometime after. KXOL would eventually exit the format on May 16, 2014 to return to Spanish AC as "Mega 96.3" after nine years and moderate to underperformed ratings.

Shortly after the debut of Latino 96.3, KPWR replaced the majority of their non-Latino DJs with personalities of Latino descent who often pepper their broadcasts with Spanish words, in an effort to regain some of the audience lost to Latino 96.3. The staff at the time represented the multi-cultural population of Los Angeles: Krystal Bee (Latino), DJ E Man (Filipino), and Todd the Hater (Armenian) of #TheCruzShow.

On August 17, 2006, KPWR's country music sister station KZLA flipped directions to rhythmic adult contemporary as "Movin' 93.9". Most of the songs played on Movin' 93.9 consisted of rhythmic pop and dance hits from the 1980s and 1990s to the present day, along with classic disco and freestyle music tracks thrown in for balance. However, after almost a year in the format, KMVN shifted directions to Rhythmic Oldies. With the unique combination of both KPWR and KZLA, the move gave Emmis and Los Angeles its first rhythmic duopoly, as well as the second duopoly in California with this arrangement, the other being Clear Channel Communications siblings KMEL and KYLD in San Francisco. That arrangement ended on April 15, 2009, when KMVN flipped to a Spanish format under a LMA with Grupo Radio Centro of Mexico City. In May 2019, Meruelo bought KXOS from GRC, reuniting the station with KPWR after 10 years.

In June 2012, KPWR was added to the iHeartRadio and TuneIn streaming platforms.

During an on-air interview on KPWR on November 3, 2015, singer/actress Ariana Grande criticized DJs Eric D-lux and Justin Credible over questions that she claimed were sexist, telling them, "You need a little brushing up on equality."

After 32 years of ownership, Emmis announced on May 9, 2017 that it sold KPWR to The Meruelo Group for $82.75 million. The announcement comes after Emmis, who exits the nation's second-largest radio market, made a deal in April with its lenders to seek $80 million worth of divestments by January 2018 to amend its credit agreement. On August 1, 2017, Meruelo took ownership of KPWR, bringing it under common ownership with classic hip hop station KDAY and Riverside/San Bernardino-targeted urban contemporary KDEY-FM, both of which would relocate to KPWR's Burbank studios; KPWR would retain its rhythmic format, air staff, and management. The station continues to report to Mediabase and BDS as rhythmic contemporary, though the station has begun to lean more urban to take on KRRL. Since the sale, it has recovered in terms of ratings and audiences.

On October 28, 2022, KPWR shifted its playlist to a much more gold-based rhythmic playlist, positioned as "Today's Hits and Throwbacks", by adding more music from the 1990s and the early 2000s.

Leading up to June 19, 2024, in celebration of Juneteenth and The Pop Out: Ken & Friends, Power 106 temporarily rebranded itself as "Kendrick 106", and exclusively played Kendrick Lamar's discography from 6 a.m. to midnight in commemoration of the concert.

== Musical programming ==
In its first seven years, KPWR's music selection focused on a mix of dance, house, freestyle, hip hop, and urban pop, while avoiding hard rock. This mix of music became known as crossover (later called rhythmic top 40), due to the way in which dance and urban music were presented to an audience that liked pop, and vice versa. This would become a major issue in the music trades after the station ascended to the top spot in the Los Angeles Arbitron ratings, where both Billboard and Radio & Records had debated as to what reporting panel it would place KPWR (as well as other stations that were using the same formula), which in turn resulted in Billboard launching a Crossover chart and Radio & Records creating a CHR P1A subcategory in 1987. By 1992-93, KPWR began to focus on a mix of hip hop and R&B music, given that it gained competition from the former urban outlet KKBT and that the original KDAY signed off around that time. In 1996, It even embraced house in addition, although the station would no longer focus on the genre by 1997. By January 2005, the station had woven in non-R&B/hip-hop artists such as Natalie, Baby Bash, the Pussycat Dolls, NB Ridaz and Gwen Stefani to the mix, resulting in a return to rhythmic Top 40. KPWR was on the Billboard R&B/Hip Hop airplay panel from 1997-2005 but reported to mediabase as Rhythmic.

As of 2012, approximately 60% of KPWR's listenership is Hispanic. and contributes to both Mediabase and BDS Rhythmic reporting panels. In addition to playing hip hop and rhythmic pop, KPWR continued to embrace dance music tracks and even incorporated them into their daily and weekend mix shows, including the program Power Tools, produced by Gerry Meraz and hosted by Richard Vission. Power Tools is the station's longest-running program, debuting in 1992.

However, by early 2016, KPWR has drastically reduced the amount of rhythmic pop and EDM tracks in its playlist to focus primarily on hip hop and R&B again. This was due to competition received from urban contemporary rival "Real 92.3", which reignited the market's hip-hop radio war from the 1990s when the station was in competition with 92.3 The Beat. Up until 2017, KPWR had also slightly increased the number of throwbacks/recurrents in its playlist, but has since refocused towards current product to reduce overlap with classic hip hop outlet KDAY. Also, as of July 2019, KPWR is the official sister station to KLLI ("Cali 93.9"), with both stations airing a rhythmic contemporary format—the latter as a Hispanic rhythmic. The sale reunited KPWR with the 93.9 frequency under common ownership for the first time since 2012. As of July 2025, KPWR re-added 90’s and Early 2000’s hip hop and R&B tracks with the addition of throwback mixes on Holidays.

== Morning shows ==
In the earlier months of Power 106's launch, Tommy Jaxson and Deborah Rath were the original morning jocks and hosts of "The Power 106 Morning Zoo". That changed when actor, comedian, and radio veteran Jay Thomas took the helm of the show, giving the program its highest-rated numbers during his tenure. Thomas left in 1992 when The Baka Boyz took over the morning slot. During fall 1997, KPWR hired a former security guard named Big Boy to replace the duo. "Big Boy's Neighborhood" featured Big Boy with Rikki Martinez, Krystal Bee, and Louie G. serving as co-hosts/sidekicks, serving up an eclectic mix of music, pop culture, celebrity interviews, and comedy segments. The program served as a launching pad for both co-host/sidekicks Tattoo, who left the station in 2010, and Luscious Liz known as Liz Hernandez, who departed on August 22, 2011 to pursue a television career with E! News.

The program became a nationally syndicated morning show on August 20, 2007, after Big Boy signed a multi-year deal with ABC Radio Networks (later Citadel Media, now Westwood One) to syndicate the show, along with his weekend countdown show, which was formerly called "Big Boy's Hip Hop Spot". In the fall of 2008, the show began to air on KPWR's sister station WQHT but would drop the show in July 2009 due to low ratings. In 2010, after Citadel announced that they would no longer syndicate the program, Dial Global picked up the show.

On February 3, 2015, Big Boy, whose contract was to expire on February 28 of that year, exited KPWR after negotiations between the two parties broke down, leading KPWR owner Emmis Communications to file a lawsuit (and injunction) to keep him off the air and from taking a $3.5 million offer from iHeartMedia, who three days earlier registered a domain and social media accounts for rhythmic AC rival KHHT, who immediately flipped back to R&B/hip hop as "Real 92.3" on February 6, 2015. This move brought the R&B/hip hop format back to that frequency for the first time since iHeartMedia's predecessor Clear Channel sold "The Beat" R&B/hip hop format and intellectual property to Radio One, who then moved it to the 100.3 FM signal in 2000. (The Beat would later flip to urban AC in 2006.) Afternoon host J. Cruz would be moved to mornings after Big Boy's departure until his move to the station in April 2019.

On April 15, 2019, J. Cruz, co-host DJ Lechero and Jeff "The Sports Dude" Garcia exited KPWR, with J. Cruz joining KRRL as their new afternoon host. Cece Valencia took over the interim "LA's Hip Hop Morning Show" until a permanent host was found. June 17 saw the launch of the station's new permanent morning show, previously led by actor Nick Cannon as "Nick Cannon Mornings", with Melissa Rios, Teddy Mora, and DJ Carisma joining him as contributors and co-hosts. On July 16, 2020, Cannon took an indefinite leave from radio over fallout from antisemitic statements he made on his podcast, ending his one-year tenure at KPWR. He returned to the station on February 25, 2021.

== KPWR-HD subchannels ==
KPWR broadcasts in HD Radio.

- KPWR-HD1 is a digital simulcast of the analog signal.

KPWR launched a Spanish-language HD2 sub-channel called "Power Dos" in August 2006. A press release from Emmis describes the new channel as a "bilingual and musically extended version" of KPWR. Power Dos left the air in 2008 due to a lack of interest.

On August 29, 2008, Emmis announced a programming partnership with WorldBand Media, using KPWR's HD3 signal to produce programming for the South Asian communities in three major cities including Los Angeles. This content began airing in mid-October 2008, and by mid-2009 moved to HD2, replacing Power Dos.

== Awards ==
In September 2011, Power 106 was named Large Market CHR Radio station of the year and awarded the Marconi Award at the National Association of Broadcasters convention in Chicago, and was nominated in 2012 for Major Market Station of the Year by the NAB.

== Logos ==
KPWR logo from 1986 to 1993 (1992−93 edition)

KPWR logo from 1993 to 2005

KPWR logo from 2013 to 2017
