= KFI (disambiguation) =

KFI is a radio station (640 AM) in Los Angeles, California, United States.

KFI may also refer to:

- KFI-FM, a radio station (105.9 FM) in Los Angeles which used that call sign from 1946 to 1951
- KFI-TV, a television station (channel 9) in Los Angeles during 1948–1951; later KHJ-TV, and KCAL-TV since 1989
- KFÍ, a basketball team in Ísafjörður, Iceland
- Kwetu Film Institute, a Rwandan film school
