= KLLI (FM) =

Hispanic rhythmic radio station in Los Angeles

- Los Angeles, California; United States
- Broadcast area: Greater Los Angeles
- Frequency: 93.9 MHz (HD Radio)
- Branding: Cali 93.9 (pronounced "Cali Ninety-Three Nine")

Programming
- Language: Spanglish
- Format: Latin pop; adult contemporary music

Ownership
- Owner: Meruelo Group; (Meruelo Radio Holdings, LLC)
- Sister stations: Radio: KDAY; KDEY-FM; KLOS; KPWR; TV: KWHY

History
- First air date: 1957
- Former call signs: KPOL-FM (1957–1978); KZLA (1978–1979); KZLA-FM (1979–1984); KZLA (1984–2006); KMVN (2006–2009); KXOS (2009–2019)
- Call sign meaning: California (two Ls)

Technical information
- Licensing authority: FCC
- Facility ID: 59987
- Class: B
- ERP: 18,500 watts horizontal; 35,000 watts vertical
- HAAT: 917 meters (3,009 ft)
- Transmitter coordinates: 34°13′36″N 118°03′59″W
- Translator: HD2: 106.3 K292HC (Los Angeles)

Links
- Public license information: Public file; LMS
- Webcast: Listen live; Listen live (via iHeartRadio)
- Website: www.cali939.com

KLLI (93.9 FM, Cali 93.9) is a radio station in Los Angeles, California. Owned by the Meruelo Group, it broadcasts a bilingual adult contemporary format. The station has studios located in Burbank, while its transmitter is based on Mount Wilson, and broadcasts in the HD Radio format.

== History ==
=== Early years ===
93.9 FM signed on the air in 1957, as KPOL-FM, a simulcast of KPOL (1540 AM) with an easy listening format. In 1977, under the ownership of Capital Cities Communications, KPOL-FM broke away from the simulcast and adopted a soft rock format similar to crosstown KNX-FM using the on-air identity "94 FM". They changed call signs to KZLA in 1978 (one year later, KPOL rejoined the simulcast and also adopted the callsign KZLA, with the FM becoming KZLA-FM).

=== Country era ===
Metromedia's KLAC (570 AM) had adopted a country format in 1970, initially competing with two stations with much weaker signals. In 1980, KHJ, owned by RKO General, changed formats to country. Around the same time, KZLA AM and FM dropped their soft rock format for country.

The three country music outlets struggled, including KZLA. In 1983, KHJ dropped country and returned to an adult contemporary format, while KLAC held its own. At this point, KZLA began to grow in the ratings as Los Angeles' only FM country station. On its website, it claimed to be the United States' most-listened-to country radio station by virtue of the market's size, though the station was never among the top fifteen stations in the Los Angeles Arbitron ratings during its 26-year run.

In 1984, Capital Cities sold KZLA (AM) to Spanish Broadcasting System (which rechristened it KSKQ) and KZLA-FM to Malrite Communications Group. Metromedia sold KLAC in 1987, to Malrite, which moved it to a classic country format. By 1994, Malrite had changed KLAC to an adult standards format from Westwood One, leaving KZLA as the established country music station in the market.

In 1994, Shamrock Broadcasting acquired KZLA and KLAC in a merger with Malrite; in 1996, Chancellor Media acquired all of Shamrock's stations, including KZLA and KLAC. The following year, Chancellor merged with Evergreen Media. Evergreen already had KKBT (then at 92.3 FM) and KOST; Chancellor subsequently acquired Viacom's KYSR and KXEZ, giving Chancellor six FM stations. In 1998, Bonneville Broadcasting made a corporate deal to swap several stations with Chancellor, giving the latter six stations, including KBIG, KYSR, KKBT, and KXEZ (which would change formats and call letters), as well as KLAC and KZLA. Bonneville, in return, would acquire KZLA.

=== Emmis ownership ===
KZLA modified the country format over the years, at times mixing in a few non-country pop songs and also playing more classic country. Bonneville exited Los Angeles in 2000, by selling KZLA to Emmis Communications. Under Emmis' ownership, most of the country songs they played during its tenure in the format were from 1987 to the present day, with some classic cuts mixed in.

In 2006, KZLA began to carry NASCAR NEXTEL Cup Series races as the local affiliate of the Motor Racing Network. The first broadcast was the Lenox Industrial Tools 300 at New Hampshire International Speedway.

KZLA is now a rhythmic oldies-formatted station in Riverdale, California.

==== MOViN 93.9 ====
"Movin' 93.9" logo (2006–2009)

On August 17, at 10:18 am, after playing "Tonight I Wanna Cry" by Keith Urban, KZLA flipped to rhythmic adult contemporary, branded as "MOViN' 93.9". The first song on "MOViN" was "Let's Get It Started" by Los Angeles group The Black Eyed Peas. The first DJ to be "let go" was the very popular Brian Douglas, who did evenings for four years. Soon after that, the station's demise was well under way with others losing their positions as well.

They were also the second station in the United States to adopt the "Movin'" concept, the first being KQMV Seattle. KQMV was not owned by Emmis; however, they did acquire the rights to use the moniker from consultant Alan Burns, who helped launch KQMV's format. Burns also teamed up with fellow consultant Guy Zapoleon (whose partnership with Burns dates back to the launch of KHMX Houston in 1990) on the new upstart.

Jimmy Steal, Emmis' vice president of programming, cited declining ratings of the country format as well as an opportunity to increase overall station and corporate revenue.

For a time, KZLA continued online, but the stream was later dropped. The FM station changed its callsign to KMVN on September 1. Host Peter Tilden moved to KABC, where he worked until being laid off in cost-cutting moves in 2008. Other personalities moved to KKGO. Garner's show, which was flagshipped at KZLA, moved to Clear Channel Communications but did not have a Los Angeles affiliate.

On the heels of launching KMVN, Emmis also signed legendary entertainment personality Rick Dees to host the morning show. Dees was host at another area station, KIIS-FM, from 1981 to 2004. Dees returned to the airwaves on September 25; in addition, KMVN picked up his "Rick Dees' Weekly Top 40" program on Sunday mornings, which started October 1. KMVN aired Weekly Top 40 with most of the non-rhythmic hits (mostly rock/pop) edited from the show because of KMVN's format. The morning show, Rick Dees in the Morning, aired from 5-10am and featured Patti "Long Legs" Lopez and Mark Wong. Over the course of a few months, the station began adding more staffers to its lineup, with Tera Bonilla doing middays, Mario Fuentes hired for afternoons, and Nena handling nights and weekends. In addition, DJ Enrie and DJ Rawn (both from KPWR) and DJ Icy Ice (a veteran of KKBT and KDAY) became the station's mixers, as KMVN started adding mixshows to its lineup, which aired weekdays at noon and 5 pm, and on Fridays ("Fiesta Mix") and Saturdays ("Movin' Party Mix", hosted by Clarence Barnes) from 7 p.m. to midnight.

The station had failed to bring in more than half of the audience it did as a country music station according to Radio and Records. After being stuck below a 1.0% share in the first two rating periods, KMVN finally recovered in the Spring 2007 Arbitron ratings, when it started to show its first increase to a 1.2% share. With KBIG's decision to shift to a mainstream adult Top 40 direction in September 2007, KMVN was hoping to inherit its rival's displaced listeners, who had grown accustomed to hearing the rhythmic fare that KBIG used to play.

By October 2007, KMVN began to phase out most of its currents and '90s songs, along with the mix shows, in an effort to improve the ratings, which had not been spectacular. They also changed their slogan to "The '70s and '80s Mix That Makes You Move", to identify with its gold-based direction. The changes had yet to translate into ratings. In the May 2008 Arbitron ratings, KMVN was in 34th place with a 0.8% audience share. By Summer 2008, KMVN began adding classic and dance-friendly modern/new wave hits from the 1980s to its musical mix, but continued to stay within the rhythmic gold realm.

KMVN had been in competition with KHHT, "Hot 92.3", which began shifting from urban AC to a rhythmic AC approach in early 2008, in an effort to counter KMVN, whose format targeted the same Black/Hispanic audience as KHHT.

(Today, the callsign KMVN is attached to a rhythmic hot AC-formatted station in Anchorage, Alaska, also using the "MOViN'" branding.)

=== Operation by Grupo Radio Centro ===
==== Exitos 93.9 ====
Exitos 93.9 from 2009 to 2014

On April 3, 2009, Emmis announced that they had entered into a seven-year local marketing agreement with Grupo Radio Centro of Mexico City. Beginning April 15, GRC started to provide Spanish-language programming and sell advertising time. GRC also entered into a seven-year call and put option agreement with Emmis which would allow them to purchase the assets of KMVN, although that portion of the deal was contingent on the FCC allowing a foreign broadcaster to own an American station, which is currently disallowed. At midnight on April 15, after airing a farewell message from Rick Dees (in which he explained the sale and impending flip before redirecting listeners of his show to his website, RICK.com, then playing "Last Dance" by Donna Summer as MOViN's final song), the station flipped to Spanish AC as "Éxitos 93.9", with the first song of the format being "El Viajero" by Luis Miguel.

On June 4, KMVN changed its call letters to KXOS, to go with the "Éxitos" branding. As of 2012, the KMVN calls are now used by a rhythmic adult contemporary station in Anchorage, Alaska.

Effective August 23, 93.9 License, LLC exercised a call option to purchase KXOS from Emmis for $85.5 million. 93.9 License, LLC is owned by 93.9 Holdings, Inc., in which GRC indirectly holds a 25% ownership interest. GRC later used a similar facility to acquire the radio stations of Univision Radio in El Paso, Texas, in 2016.

On November 9, the entire KXOS airstaff was let go, and the station switched to a teen-oriented CHR/rhythmic Top 40 format, similar to that of sister stations XHTO-FM in El Paso and XHFAJ-FM in Mexico City. It also used some of XHFAJ's DJs to voicetrack in key dayparts on KXOS, but the station also was required to utilize local talent because of the FCC's ownership rules.

==== Radio Centro 93.9 ====
On January 19, 2014, KXOS changed its format to regional Mexican, branded as "Radio Centro 93.9" while keeping the same logo scheme. The move came after KXOS hired former KLAX morning host Ricardo ‘El Mandril’ Sánchez for the same duties. Sanchez had been the subject of controversy during his tenure at KLAX involving claims of ratings fraud and tampering which were never proven. His show at KLAX was taken off the air in November 2013, due to contract negotiations that were not successful.

In August 2015, former station general manager Sean O'Neill, office manager Rosa Ambriz, and 50 unnamed employees, sued Grupo Radio Centro, its L.A. subsidiary, as well as Sánchez. O'Neill and Ambriz alleged that they were fired after reporting ratings fraud and uncovering the station's hiring of undocumented immigrants.

=== Meruelo Group ownership ===
On May 22, 2019, Meruelo Group (owners of KPWR (which they acquired from Emmis in 2017), KLOS (which they acquired from Cumulus Media a month earlier), simulcasters KDAY/KDEY, and Spanish-language television stations KWHY and KBEH) announced that it would acquire KXOS for $35 million. On July 17, KXOS disc jockeys said their farewells in advance of a potential format change.

==== Cali 93.9 ====
First Cali 93.9 logo from 2019-2026

Upon the closure of the acquisition on July 17, the station's callsign was changed to KLLI. On July 18, Meruelo flipped the station to Spanish hot AC branded as Cali 93.9 at (appropriately) 9:39 a.m. that day. The first song played on "Cali 93.9" was "Con Calma" by Daddy Yankee featuring Snow. Meruelo would also partner with Grupo Radio Centro to launch a Spanish All-News format on the HD2 subchannel of KXOS, while also developing content for KWHY. With the acquisition, the station was reunited with KPWR after seven years.

On July 2, 2026 at 10:00 AM, after playing "Por un Segundo" by Aventura, KLLI shifted to a bilingual adult contemporary format, dropping most songs from after 2020, adding English pop and 1980s music, and laying off all on-air staff. Launching with "Bye Bye Bye" by NSYNC, the previous Spanish hot AC format proved unsuccessful, only registering a 1.5 in the May 2026 Nielsen books.

== HD Radio ==
On June 2, 2025, as part of a sponsorship with the recently relaunched Slice soda brand, KLLI-HD2, being fed by low-wattage translator 106.3 K292HC (previously used to simulcast KFOX), launched a microformat for the month of June branded as "106.3 The Fizz", with the entirety of the format generated by artificial intelligence utilized by advertising company BarkleyOKRP, including AI-generated music meant to mimic styles used in the 1980s and 1990s (the previous decades the soda brand, then owned by PepsiCo, had existed), branded as "Yesterday's pop hits, that didn't exist until now", formatted around an AI generated countdown show hosted by female AI-generated personality "Bev".

Following the conclusion of the stunt, KLLi-HD2 flipped to an K-pop format in July 2025 branded as R.A.I.N. (Radio AI Network), in partnership with KFOX. The new format continues to leverage AI, with the station featuring the automated host Nahbee and "real-time music curation".
