= Earle C. Anthony =

American businessman and philanthropist

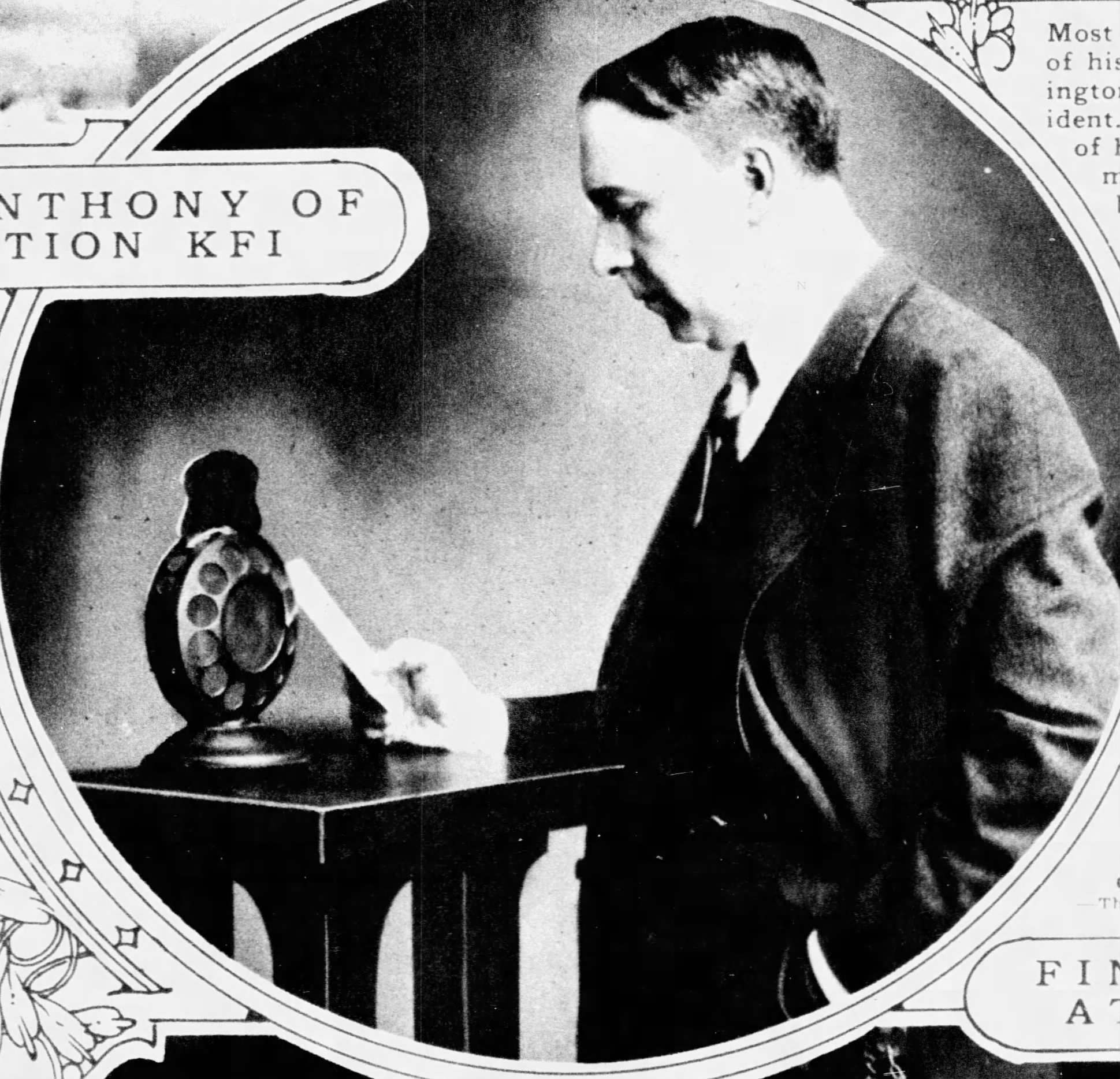
- Anthony at KFI in 1925
- Born: December 18, 1880
- Died: August 6, 1961 (aged 80)
- Occupation: Businessman

Earle C. Anthony (December 18, 1880—August 6, 1961) was an American businessman and philanthropist based in Los Angeles, California. He worked in broadcasting and automobiles and was also a songwriter, journalist and playwright.

== Early life ==
Earle C. Anthony was born on December 18, 1880.

In 1903, Earle C. Anthony founded the California Pelican, UC Berkeley's first humor magazine, during his student years.

== Career ==
In 1897, Anthony built an electric automobile of his own design, the first to run in Los Angeles, at the age of 17. A replica of this car, made in the 1920s with parts of the original automobile, is exhibited in the Petersen Automotive Museum in Los Angeles.

On 22 February 1904, Anthony and his father opened the Western Motor Car Company in Los Angeles, as a dealer for National, Northern and Thomas automobile brands, and the following year he acquired a Packard distributorship.

In the 1930s, Anthony acquired a Hudson automobile brand distributorship. He became a distributor for eighteen brands. Anthony refined his interest until he represented only Packard.

Anthony constructed a 50 watt transmitter, on a breadboard, on his kitchen table, received a license from the Department of Commerce, and began broadcasting as KFI on April 16, 1922.

In 1923, Anthony was the founder and owner of what eventually became 50,000-watt KFI AM (640) radio, a station he controlled until his death in 1961. From 1929 to 1944, he also owned KECA/1430, which evolved into KABC. He was an early president of the National Association of Broadcasters and during his term oversaw the establishment of the organization's first paid staff. He also was a founder of one of the earliest television stations in Los Angeles, KFI-TV (channel 9, now KCAL-TV), and KFI-FM (105.9 MHz, now defunct), both of which were disposed of in 1951.

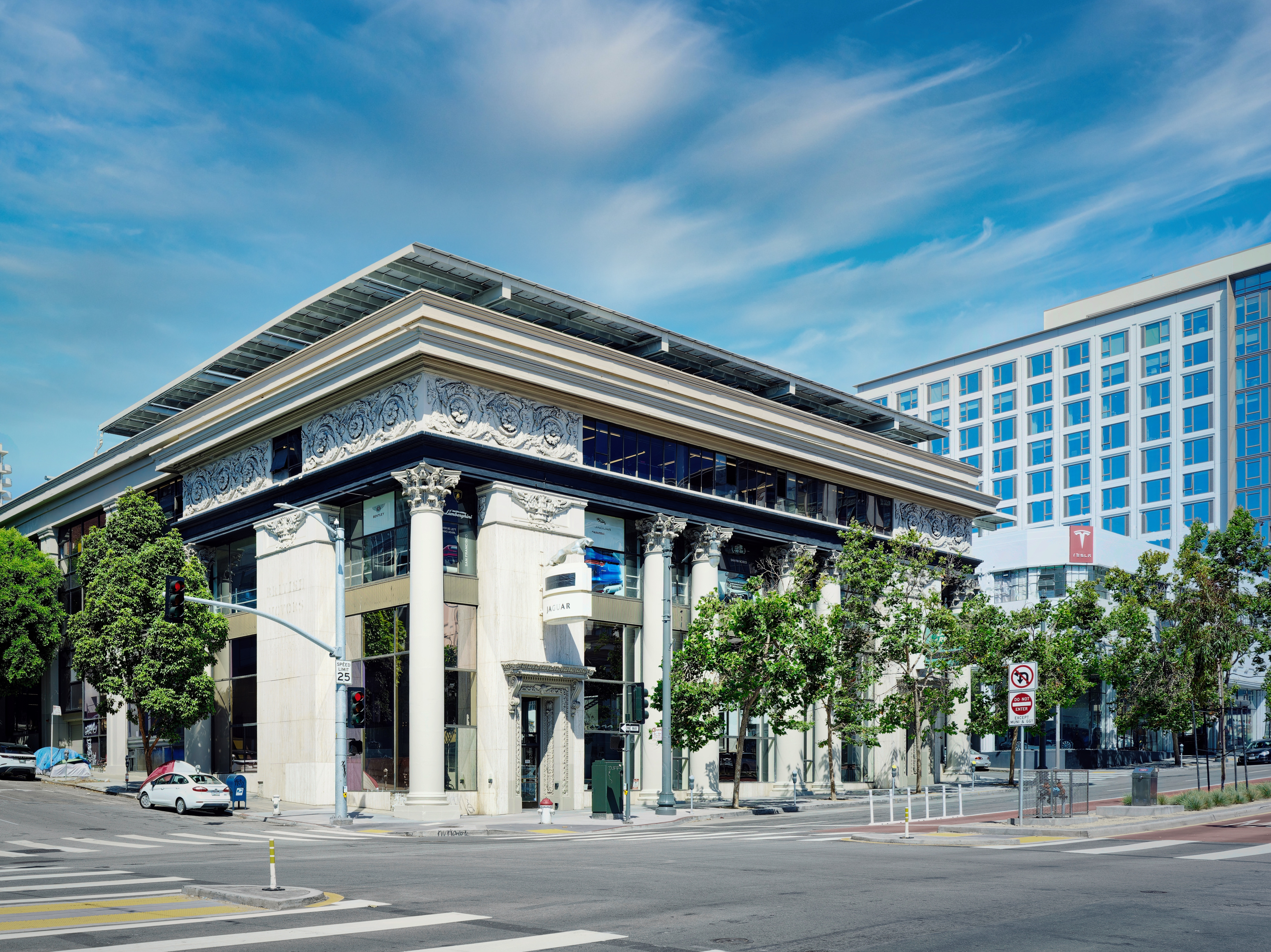
Earle C. Anthony Packard Showroom at 901 Van Ness Ave in San Francisco

From 1915 to 1957, Anthony was the Packard distributor for all of California, "the world's most prominent Packard car dealer", selling one out of every seven Packards. When Packard was merged with Studebaker Corporation, Anthony saw the handwriting on the wall and relinquished his 40 plus year relationship with Packard. In the Summer of 1957, Anthony acquired two franchises for the ill-fated Edsel, a new, medium-priced car from Ford Motor Company, one in San Francisco and one in Los Angeles. In the fall of 1957, Anthony also got the Lincoln Franchise for Los Angeles and later added Mercury in the Summer of 1958. He would remain a Lincoln-Mercury dealer until his death.

He was also instrumental in developing the concept of the gasoline service station, opening the first two in California (the Chevron was the trademark of the National Supply Co., a service station chain Anthony headed with several other auto dealers and sold, a few years later, to the Standard Oil Company of California in 1913.) He was also a pioneer in inter-urban bus transportation, founding a company later incorporated into Pacific Greyhound lines and had a role in the development of car radios. He influenced the building of the Golden Gate Bridge.

=== Former Earle C. Anthony-owned stations ===
Stations are arranged in alphabetical order by state and city of license.

- (**) Indicates a station that was built and signed-on by Earle C. Anthony.

City of license / Market	Station	Channel TV (RF)	Years owned	Current ownership status
Los Angeles, California	KFI-TV	9 (9)	1948–1951	Independent KCAL-TV, owned by CBS News and Stations

=== Radio stations ===
AM Station	FM Station

City of license / Market	Station	Years owned	Current ownership status
Los Angeles	KFI 640 **	1922–1961	owned by IHeartMedia
Los Angeles	KECA 790	1929–1944	KABC owned by Cumulus Media
Los Angeles	KFI-FM 105.9 **	1947–1951	Defunct, ceased operations in 1951

== Philanthropy ==
Anthony was active in many civic activities. He helped save the Hollywood Bowl by assuming leadership of the Symphony Under Stars Foundation in the early 1930s. He donated resources for a wind-resistant cross to replace others that had previously been blown over in the Coachella Valley (Palm Springs).

Anthony helped to bring major league baseball to Los Angeles. This resulted in the Los Angeles Dodger games being carried on KFI and Dodger owner Walter O'Malley becoming a board member of Earle C. Anthony, Inc., according to his biographer, Arthur Landing.

Anthony also founded the Los Angeles Auto Show, introduced neon signs to Southern California from France, and personally built the first automobile ever constructed in Los Angeles (later rebuilt and now in the possession of the Petersen Automotive Museum in Los Angeles).

== Personal life, death and legacy ==
Anthony was a lifelong Episcopalian.

Anthony died on August 6, 1961.

Anthony's only son, Kelly Anthony, was disabled in a WWII mishap and died a few months after his father. Anthony's fortune was left to a trust that was established mainly for endowing fellowships at the California Institute of Technology and UC Berkeley which was Anthony’s alma mater.

Some of Anthony's employees and friends also received pensions from the trust for the rest of their lives.

His home in the Los Feliz area of Los Angeles was designed by Bernard Maybeck. Over the property's history, many internationally distinguished visitors were entertained in the mansion and its eight and one half acre environs. The core building was designed by Maybeck in the style of a medieval renaissance castle. The basic Norman-French and Spanish structure also exhibits Greco-Roman and Moorish influences. After the death of Anthony's wife the home was purchased in the early fifties by Sir Daniel J. and Countess Bernardine Murphy Donohue. The mansion was donated to the Immaculate Heart Sisters in 1971 upon the death of the Countess. The interior of the Nordic entrance tower was furnished by Donohue as a replica of the Pope's prayer room at the Vatican in Rome.

As noted, Donohue bequeathed the property to the Sisters of the Immaculate Heart of Mary. It is currently now known as the Cardinal Timothy Manning House of Prayer for Priests and the Immaculate Heart Retreat House. It is an urban sanctuary available to individuals or groups for a few hours or a day for reflection and prayer. A chapel, dining room and conference rooms are available.

2014-2019, Anthony's, Bernard Maybeck designed, 8-acre estate with 30,000 square feet of living space, a pool, tower and prayer house was to be sold for $14.5 million by the Archdiocese of Los Angeles to Katy Perry, but disputed by Canfield-Moreno Estate owner Dana Hollister, restaurateur, and the Sisters of the Immaculate Heart of Mary. By 2021, it had not sold.
