= Fuji Food =

American food manufacturer

Fuji Food Products, Inc.
- Company type: Family business
- Industry: Food Products & Manufacturer
- Founded: 1990
- Headquarters: Santa Fe Springs, California, United States
- Key people: Kenny Sung & Christine Sung
- Products: Pre-packed sushi
- Owner: Meruelo Group
- Number of employees: More than 500 nationwide
- Website: www.fujifood.com

Fuji Food Products is a food manufacturer based in Santa Fe Springs, California, United States, that specializes in ready-to-eat sushi products for supermarkets in the United States. The company is owned by Meruelo Group which purchased it in 2009.

== History ==
In 1990, Fuji Food Products was established as a family business in San Diego, California and supplied sushi products for regional supermarkets. In 1998, Fuji Food Products provided their products to major supermarket chains. In 2017, their products are available in most states in the US.

With over 500 employees, Fuji Food Products is now the largest provider and distributor of pre-packaged Sushi in the United States.

In April, 2011, Fuji Food Products acquired Okami, Inc., a manufacturer of ethnic meals.

In 2019, after a recall from Trader Joe's and other major markets Fuji Food Products closed their facility located in Brockton, MA.

== See also ==
- ABL Corporation
- Firehouse Subs
