= Andrew Barroway =

American hedge fund manager

- Education: Cherry Hill High School East, Rutgers University

Andrew Barroway is an American hedge fund manager. He was the majority owner of Greek football club Athens Kallithea FC until 2025, and was formerly the owner of the Arizona Coyotes hockey team in the National Hockey League.

== Early life and education ==
Raised in Cherry Hill, New Jersey, Barroway attended Cherry Hill High School East and Rutgers University, before earning a Juris Doctor degree at the University of Pennsylvania Law School.

== Career ==
In October 2014, he agreed to purchase the 51% majority share of the Coyotes for $152.5 million, a franchise that was reportedly valued by Coyotes' president Anthony LeBlanc at $305 million. On December 31, 2014, the NHL Board of Governors approved the sale. The team had been previously purchased out of bankruptcy by LeBlanc's group for $170 million in 2013 with substantial concessions by the City of Glendale. The City of Glendale paid subsidies to the NHL when revenue and value failed to meet the required minimums during bankruptcy proceedings. The NHL Board of Governors prevented the city from acquiring an ownership share in the franchise.

In 2015, it was reported that Barroway had missed payments and would be removed from the majority shareholder position. However, in 2016, Barroway reportedly obtained a greater share of the franchise with up to 54% of the shares. In 2017, Barroway then bought out the rest of his IceArizona partners to become the sole shareholder. In 2019, Barroway sold majority interest in the team to Alex Meruelo.

In August 2021, Barroway purchased the 90% majority share of the Greek football (soccer) club Athens Kallithea FC for €300.000.

On March 23, 2023, Barroway was arrested in Aspen, Colorado on charges of assault and domestic violence. On March 27, 2023, NHL commissioner Gary Bettman announced that Barroway was suspended indefinitely from the league pending further information. On August 30, 2023, prosecutors filed a motion to dismiss the charges. Despite that, the NHL announced they banned Barroway from ownership of the Coyotes, leaving Alex Meruelo as the sole owner of the franchise.
