= KJLH =

Radio station in Compton–Los Angeles, California

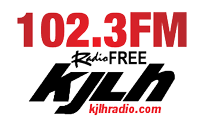
- Compton, California; United States
- Broadcast area: Los Angeles
- Frequency: 102.3 MHz (HD Radio)
- Branding: Radio Free 102.3 KJLH

Programming
- Format: Urban adult contemporary
- Affiliations: Premiere Networks

Ownership
- Owner: Taxi Productions; (Taxi License Corporation)

History
- First air date: 1951
- Former call signs: KFOX-FM (1951–1965); KILB (1965)
- Call sign meaning: John Lamar Hill III, owner of Angelus Funeral Home (former owner)

Technical information
- Licensing authority: FCC
- Facility ID: 64639
- Class: A
- ERP: 5,600 watts
- HAAT: 103 meters (338 ft)
- Transmitter coordinates: 33°59′52″N 118°21′32″W

Links
- Public license information: Public file; LMS
- Webcast: MP3 stream (64 Kb); AAC stream (64 Kb); Web player
- Website: kjlhradio.com

KJLH (102.3 FM) is an urban adult contemporary radio station licensed to Compton, California, and serving the Los Angeles area. KJLH is owned by Taxi Productions, which in turn is owned by musician Stevie Wonder and operates from studios located on North La Brea Avenue in Inglewood, with its transmitter situated in a portion of unincorporated Los Angeles County in View Park-Windsor Hills.

== History ==
The 102.3 signal was originally licensed to Long Beach, California, with the callsign KFOX-FM consisting of a country music format; upon a 1961 sale to the Illinois-California Broadcasting Co., the callsign was changed to KILB.

In 1965, African American businessman John Lamar Hill, then-owner of the Angelus Funeral Home based in South Los Angeles, bought KILB from the previous owners. It was relaunched as KJLH with a Black radio format consisting of smooth R&B, soul, jazz and MOR music. Not long after Hill took ownership, KJLH's transmitter was moved from Long Beach to its current location to give better signal coverage to the growing African American community in Los Angeles (as well as Compton and Inglewood), and the city of license was relocated to Compton. For years, the station's original studios were based in the Crenshaw district, just north of present-day Baldwin Hills Crenshaw Plaza shopping mall, and next door to the Angelus Funeral Home on Crenshaw Boulevard, near 39th Street.

In 1979, after 14 years of ownership, Hill sold KJLH to R&B/pop/soul musician Stevie Wonder for more than $2 million; he created a separate corporation, Taxi Productions, for the purposes of purchasing and managing the station away from his other business affairs. Under this change of ownership, Wonder gave KJLH its on-air slogan to match the call letters: "Kindness, Joy, Love & Happiness". It also transitioned its format to urban contemporary at the time. To date, even in spite of two different ownership phases, KJLH is the oldest African American-owned radio station on the West Coast.

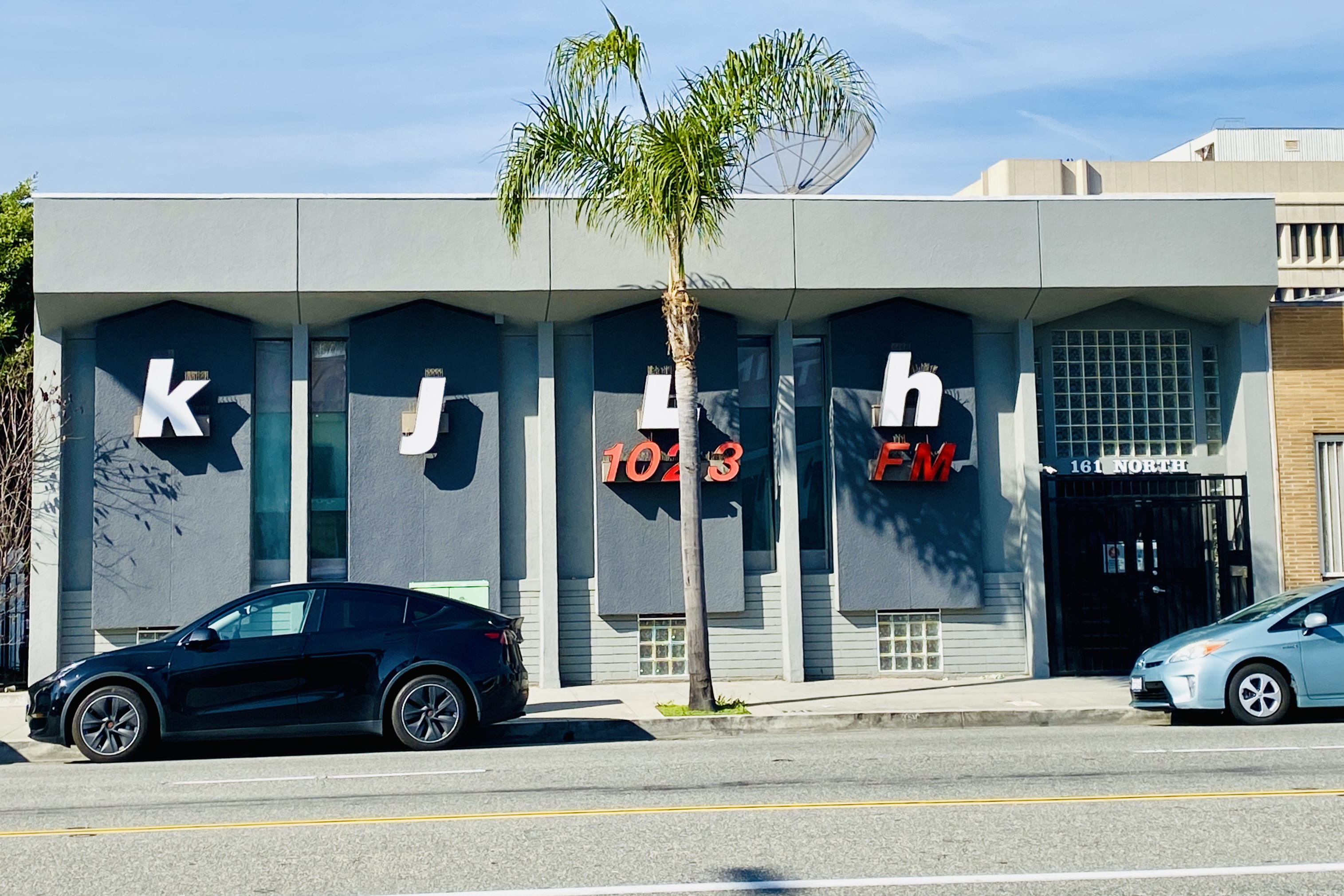
KJLH building in Inglewood on La Brea

During its first eight years, KJLH enjoyed modest success as a R&B/Urban station, and a had great familiarity with the African-American community. However, it was hampered by the fact that the station was on a Class-A FM signal; it only broadcast at 2,250 watts, limiting the signal to the central and southern portions of Los Angeles County (including Downtown and South Central Los Angeles), while in other areas like the San Fernando Valley, the signal would be weak or non-existent, depending on where the station can be picked up with a strong antenna. (KJLH received a signal upgrade to 5,600 watts in 2000.)

From the late 1970s up to the late 1980s, they were one of five R&B/Urban stations in the market that targeted the African-American community, along with AMs KGFJ and KDAY, and FMs KACE and KUTE. Of the four that have since flipped formats, only the KDAY calls have since been revived, but on the FM dial, and like KJLH, they also have limited signal coverage.

In 1986, KJLH would pick up an unlikely competitor that would deal them their first major blow: KPWR. When that station debuted, Wonder retaliated by cutting new imaging and liners in the hopes of retaining their listener base, but that tactic backfired as they began to see its audience going over to the full-powered "Power 106", and would never recover.

Its second setback would be the 1990 debut of KKBT, whose evolution to an R&B/soul/hip hop direction would result in KJLH going into a more Mainstream Urban direction in 1992 under the programming of Frankie Ross and the direction of the owner renamed the station KJLH Rhythm 102.3, but that tactic backfired. Before resigning Frankie dropped “The Rhythm” moniker and changed the format to what became known today as Urban AC and the station's numbers improved. Cliff Winston was appointed to PD and increased its playlist with urban smooth jazz crossovers, R&B oldies, current R&B and gospel crossovers. In addition, KJLH would embrace the growing neo-soul music genre at the time.

KJLH would get more competition in 2001, when KCMG dropped rhythmic oldies to become KHHT (it is now urban contemporary formatted hip hop rival KRRL). That move would lead to rumors that KJLH would flip to an all-gospel music format, but the station decided not to make a format change. In 2006, the rumors came back once again, as KKBT dropped their R&B/hip-hop direction to go adult R&B (and six months later, change their calls to KRBV and adopt new branding), giving the market three stations with the same format (KRBV is now Contemporary Christian-formatted KKLQ).

Despite the setbacks, KJLH has maintained serving the community in addition to its longtime audience. It has an extensive lineup of religious programming, including gospel music weekday mornings and all day Sundays. KJLH is also the only adult R&B station with a continuous live and local air staff. In addition, most of KJLH's on air staff has been with KJLH longer than former rivals KHHT and especially KRBV, which have seen multiple turnovers. Both KHHT and KRBV abandoned the format in the late 2000s.

KJLH became the third overall urban radio station in Los Angeles to carry The Steve Harvey Morning Show on August 10, 2009; this comes after KDAY dropped the show. The former KKBT was the original home of the Steve Harvey Morning Show when it started out as a local show.

As of 2009, when KDAY flipped to classic hip-hop, KJLH added more hip-hop in the playlist, still classifying the station as urban adult contemporary. In August 2009, KJLH tweaked towards a rhythmic-leaning urban AC direction for a brief period, and dropped a majority of the urban jazz content that they used to focus on for much of the 1990s and early 2000s, to satisfy the younger end of its listener base. KJLH also briefly added hip hop artists such as J. Cole, Drake, Lil' Wayne, Jay-Z, and Nicki Minaj to its playlist to fill a void for urban hip hop audiences, as KPWR has long since refocused its audience target to Latinos with its rhythmic format; it later on scaled back on most hip hop titles with KRRL's debut in 2015. As of November 2013, KJLH faces new competition with KTWV, which has evolved from smooth jazz to a pop-driven urban AC direction.

KJLH celebrated its 50th anniversary in 2015.
