= Verne Carlson =

American film teacher and author

- Born: April 8, 1926
- Died: February 5, 2003 (aged 76); Oxnard, California, U.S.
- Occupations: film teacher and author

Verne Carlson (April 8, 1926 – February 5, 2003) was an American film cinematographer, director and writer, and a cinematography film teacher and author.

== Teacher ==
Carlson was an associate professor at California State University, Long Beach and also taught at the American Film Institute in cinematography.

== Author ==
Carlson wrote or co-wrote 22 books which had 102 publications in 4 languages. His works comprise more than 1,500 library holdings in the genre of handbooks and dictionaries. His work "Cowboy Cookbook" was designated by the Library of Congress and the U.S. State Department as "a historical document of Western Americana". Several of his handbooks are used as course textbooks at university film schools. His works include:

- The Professional Cameraman's Handbook by Sylvia E. Carlson and Verne Carlson, (1970) a.k.a. "Professional 16/35mm Cameraman's Handbook" ISBN 0-240-80080-X
- Professional Lighting Handbook by Verne and Sylvia Carlson, (1984) ISBN 0-240-51721-0
- Translation of Film & Video Terms into French by Verne Carlson, (1984) ISBN 0-943288-00-2
- Translation of Film & Video Terms into German by Verne Carlson, (1984) ISBN 0-943288-01-0
- Translation of Film & Video Terms into Italian by Verne Carlson, (1984) ISBN 0-943288-02-9
- Translation of Film & Video Terms into Spanish by Verne Carlson, (1984) ISBN 0-943288-02-9
- Translation of Film & Video Terms into Japanese by Verne Carlson, (1984) ISBN 0-943288-03-7
- The Cowboy Cookbook by Verne Carlson, (June 15, 1999) ISBN 978-0-937844-00-7

== Final years ==
Carlson moved to Oxnard, California with his partner and died of heart failure on February 5, 2003.
