= KDAY =

- Redondo Beach, California; United States
- Broadcast area: Los Angeles County and Orange County
- Frequency: 93.5 MHz (HD Radio)
- Branding: 93.5 KDAY (pronounced "Ninety-Three Five, K-Day")

Programming
- Format: Classic hip-hop
- Affiliations: Compass Media Networks

Ownership
- Owner: Meruelo Group; (Meruelo Radio Holdings, LLC)
- Sister stations: KDEY-FM; KLLI; KLOS; KPWR

History
- First air date: 1961
- Former call signs: KAPP-FM (1961–1965); KKOP (1965–1978); KFOX (1978–2000); KMJR (2000–2001); KFSG (2001–2003); KZAB (2003–2004)
- Call sign meaning: Original KDAY (AM) was a Daytimer (i.e., shut down at night)

Technical information
- Licensing authority: FCC
- Facility ID: 10100
- Class: A
- ERP: 4,200 watts
- HAAT: 117 meters (384 ft)
- Transmitter coordinates: 34°0′19″N 118°21′44″W
- Repeater: 93.5 KDEY-FM (Ontario)

Links
- Public license information: Public file; LMS
- Webcast: Listen Live
- Website: 935kday.com

KDAY (93.5 FM, "93.5 KDAY") is a radio station that is licensed to Redondo Beach, California and serves the Greater Los Angeles area. The station is owned by Meruelo Media and airs a classic hip hop format. The station's studios are located in Burbank and its transmitter is in Baldwin Hills. KDAY also extends its signal coverage into the Inland Empire by adding a full power simulcast, KDEY-FM in Ontario, California to fill in all of the overlapping and gaping issues and problems in its eastern coverage area.

KDAY's HD Radio format is R&B.

== History of KDAY ==
=== The original KDAY on 1580 AM ===
KDAY first signed on in 1948 as a 10,000-watt soul/R&B outlet at 1580 AM. Its call sign represented the fact that it was a "daytimer"; i.e., it broadcast only during daytime hours and signed off every evening. It flipped to a top 40 format a short time later.

After his firing from WABC in November 1959, famed disc jockey Alan Freed arrived at KDAY and worked there for about one year. By that time the station had a 50,000-watt transmitter but was on-air only during the daytime.

In 1960, George Carlin, with his comedy partner Jack Burns, arrived in Los Angeles and were hired at KDAY for their comedic stylings. They performed in area coffee houses when the radio station went off the air at sunset and were subsequently discovered and performed on Tonight Starring Jack Paar. Carlin and Burns worked at the station for less than six months. In 1972, KDAY switched to album-oriented rock only to revert to soul/R&B in January 1974. KDAY moved its transmitter to Los Angeles in 1968, and concurrently upgraded to 50,000 watts day and night. FM stations such as KJLH grew in popularity in the early 1980s, cutting into KDAY's audience. KDAY fought back by hiring Greg Mack from KMJQ in Houston as music director in 1983. Mack eventually added hip hop music to the station's playlist to appeal to mostly young Black and Latino listeners. Dr. Dre and DJ Yella Boy became the first mixer DJs at the station.

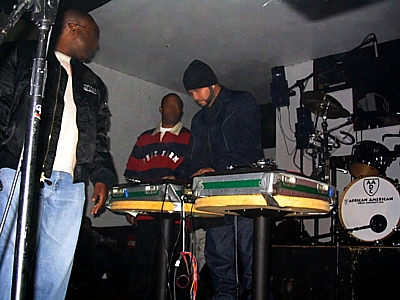
Former KDAY radio personality Greg Mack (far left) and "mixmaster" DJ Julio G (center) at the KDAY AM 1580 20th anniversary in 2003.

In the first ratings period under Mack's leadership, KDAY's ratings beat another Los Angeles Black AM station, KGFJ, and "began to enjoy a second life as the only rap-friendly station in town and, frankly, in the entire country." By September 1983, KDAY also upgraded its sound to AM stereo. Dan Charnas described KDAY's audio upgrade as "laughable" and "sounding like two tinny AM radios playing side by side."

After violence in the stands forced the cancellation of a Run-DMC concert at the Long Beach Arena for the group's Raising Hell tour, KDAY organized a "Day of Peace" on October 9, 1986. In a two-hour special, KDAY featured Run-DMC, singer Barry White, and boxer Paul Gonzales appealing to rival gangs to stop feuding and opened phone lines for callers to describe gangs' impact in their communities. There were no murders or incidents of gang violence that day. Within two weeks, the Bloods and Crips, the two largest gangs in Los Angeles, signed a peace treaty.

In 1990, Mack left KDAY that year to work for rival KJLH. Real estate investor Fred Sands, who also owned heavy metal station KNAC, bought KDAY the next year. On March 28, 1991, at 1 p.m., KDAY switched to a business format with call letters KBLA.

=== KDAY at 93.5 FM ===
KDAY was resurrected on 93.5 FM on September 20, 2004, offering a rhythmic contemporary format that emphasized old school hip hop, a nod to its AM heritage. Although, 93.5 was branding itself as KDAY, its call letters were still KZAB. As KDAY was being used by a Radio station in Independence and a TV Station in Bishop, California. The station manager of KDAY 92.5 and TV 33 noticed 93.5's branding during a visit to LA. He would tell the stations owner Benett Kessler. After a couple of weeks, Styles Media would approach Benett about purchasing the KDAY call letter from her stations, the deal went through and on December 10, 2004 93.5 had the KDAY call letters while Bennett's stations were renamed KSRW.

In April 2006, KDAY began moving away from rhythmic contemporary and toward an urban contemporary approach as the station refocused its target audience toward African Americans. This was in response to competitor KPWR (Power 106) de-emphasizing urban in favor of rhythmic contemporary in order to target Hispanic listeners. Due to sinking ratings, a month later, long-time hip-hop/R&B station KKBT eliminated hip hop from the format, and flipped to a mixture of urban adult contemporary (urban AC) and urban talk programs, similar in format to KHHT and KJLH. (Only afterwards did KKBT change its call letters and name to KRBV and "V100".) In addition, KDAY brought Steve Harvey on board on Memorial Day weekend in 2006; he had been released by KKBT the previous year. Weeks later, rival KKBT signed on Tom Joyner to carry his syndicated morning show there; however, in December 2006, KKBT would dismiss Joyner due to low ratings, partly attributed to Harvey's success.

On July 23, 2007, KDAY and sister station KDAI in Ontario, California temporarily switched from an urban contemporary format to rhythmic contemporary under the consultancy of Harry Lyles and newly installed program director Theo. In a statement to online trade publication All Access, Lyles commented on the changes: "I am very excited and thrilled to be working with Don McCoy, Roy Laughlin and Theo. All we're doing is playing to the taste of Los Angeles and if we play what they want, they will listen. With PPM coming, this will make things a lot more interesting in Los Angeles." The format turnback might have been spurred by Magic Broadcasting's July 19 sale of KWIE (96.1 FM, "Wild 96.1") in San Jacinto. Originally, the KDAY call letters were intended to be dropped in favor of the station picking up the KWIE calls as "Wild 93.5". For a time, the station only referenced itself as simply "93.5" on air until it could come up with a name and a call sign to fit the rhythmic format. This happened in July 2007, when the sale of KWIE to Liberman Broadcasting was completed and that station became KRQB. The KWIE call letters moved to the Ontario station, which at the time held the call sign KDAI. After the sale was completed, the format tweak ended up being only temporary; the intent was for KWIE listeners in the Inland Empire to migrate to the 93.5 FM signal as KDAY reverted to urban contemporary the following August.

On April 8, 2008, Radio One inked a deal with KDAY which saw the station pick up the former "Beat" branding, logo and several syndicated shows from Radio One. The move came after Radio One sold KRBV to Bonneville International, who in turn dropped KRBV's urban AC format the previous day; that station is now KKLQ. From that point, the station used the slogan "The Beat of LA", a nod to the popular hip hop station during the 1990s and early 2000s. One such personality who returned to Los Angeles radio following KRBV's flip was Michael Baisden, host of the syndicated afternoon show Love Lust and Lies which debuted on KDAY August 18.

On August 14, 2008, the station's signal was upgraded from 3.4 kW to 4.2 kW thanks to a new transmitter that improved coverage throughout the Los Angeles metropolitan area. The new tower replaced one that had been in use for fifty years. Also around this time, KDAY tweaked its mainstream urban format to a hybrid urban AC/urban talk approach — a direction similar to urban AC, but featuring current adult-friendly R&B music with on-air talk personalities and some hip-hop product — targeting an 18–49 audience. Most of KDAY's programming was being filled by syndicated shows during the day, except for DJ Theo's slow jam show Theo After Hours, which aired live weeknights. The same day, KWIE dropped its simulcast of KDAY and flipped to a rhythmic adult contemporary format branded "FLO 93.5". According to station management, the decision to tweak KDAY's format was due to Arbitron's plans to implement the Portable People Meter (PPM) in the Los Angeles radio market and where they believe they can tap into certain areas where they can attract the African American audience. The new changes resulted in R&R and Nielsen BDS removing the station from the Urban reporting radio panel in its August 29, 2008 issue.

These changes were not popular with KDAY's listeners. Criticism arose over dropping live airstaff in favor of increased syndicated content and replacing hip hop music with the urban AC/talk format; listeners claimed the owners had ruined the legacies of both KDAY and The Beat. Those upset with the new approach predicted its demise as it was already tried unsuccessfully at KKBT; they also felt that Los Angeles could not support two adult R&B outlets (the other being KJLH, as KHHT was a rhythmic AC outlet aimed at Hispanics).

=== Return to classic hip hop ===
There had been hints of possible changes at KDAY coming throughout mid-2008, which became evident in the station's decision to replace Mo'Nique's syndicated show in October 2008 for more music-driven local content. Another move would come with programming director Theo's exit several weeks later, with Adrian "AD" Scott becoming interim PD in addition to his Operations Manager duties. As a result, KDAY made a shift back to an urban format and was reinstated to the R&R/BDS Urban panel in January 2009. The following March, KDAY re-added local air personalities to its lineup, with DJ Dense taking middays and Tha Goodfellas, who had been handling afternoons and weekends, taking the evening slot. The Steve Harvey Morning Show was dropped on May 29, 2009, but later resurfaced on KJLH. In addition, Michael Baisden's nationally syndicated show, which aired in afternoon drive, was dropped on July 31, 2009. This was followed by Keith Sweat's nationally syndicated show, The Keith Sweat Hotel.

At the "Fresh Fest" concert at Nokia Theatre in downtown Los Angeles, hints were made on stage (including a new logo that was shown on all stage banners and screen graphics) that a full-blown format flip to resemble the original KDAY's classic hip hop sound would occur on August 17, 2009, at 7:30 a.m. At that time, after playing Boyz II Men's "End of the Road", the station dropped the "Beat" branding and reverted to KDAY, with Snoop Dogg's "Gin & Juice" ushering in the new format. Station spots between songs indicated that the previous syndicated fare was a programming mistake on the part of KDAY that did not reflect what Los Angeles fans wanted and that the station would "never do that again". The flip officially left Los Angeles as the largest market without an urban contemporary station until KHHT flipped back to that format as KRRL in 2015, replacing Houston in that distinction. (Houston would regain an urban contemporary outlet in KHHT's sister station KKRW, which flipped to that format over a year before KHHT.) A month later, in September 2009, KWIE would return to simulcasting KDAY under new call letters KDEY-FM.

In November 2009, KDAY management hired veteran programming consultants Bill Tanner and Steve Smith to help in the evolution of the station alongside program director Adrian Scott, new operations manager Brian Bridgman, and new general manager Zeke Chaidez. Tanner explained what was in store for KDAY's future: "Brian, Steve and I have offered some refinements based on our many years of experience in Los Angeles ... We're just getting started with the music. We will be adding jocks and more surprises in the weeks ahead." On-air music mixing returned to the station with the additions of Mr. AD, Eddy Xpress, Class1c, and DJ Dense.

On December 27, 2010, Magic Broadcasting announced it would sell KDAY and KDEY-FM to SoCal935, LLC for $35 million. At the time, SoCal935's principal investors Warren Chang and John Hearne also had a financial stake in Riverside rhythmic contemporary station KQIE. The Federal Communications Commission (FCC) approved the sale on December 8, 2011; however, even after three extensions of time to consummate the sale, the transfer of ownership never took place.

Another proposed sale of KDAY and KDEY-FM was announced April 10, 2013, this time to RBC Communications, a group led by Chinese/Hong Kong broadcaster Phoenix Television and its editor-in-chief and current affairs anchor Anthony Yuen. By October, however, RBC had pulled out of the deal, marking the second failed attempt by Magic to divest the two stations.

On June 7, 2015, KDAY began airing Art Laboe's syndicated six-hour Sunday night urban oldies program The Art Laboe Connection. Previously, the show was broadcast on KHHT until the aforementioned flip of that station in February 2015.

KDEY-FM dropped its simulcast of KDAY a second time in February 2017, as the former flipped to an urban contemporary format targeting its local Inland Empire market as "Wild 93.5". Before the switch, owner Meruelo Media filed a special temporary authority with the FCC for KDEY-FM by reducing power to determine any possible co-channel interference issues. However, after just seven months, KDEY-FM would return to simulcasting with KDAY for a third time on October 30, 2017.

On May 9, 2017, Emmis Broadcasting sold KDAY competitor KPWR (Power 106) to Meruelo Group for $82.75 million; Meruelo began operating KPWR that July. As a result of the acquisition and the company's decision to retain KPWR's rhythmic contemporary format, airstaff and management, Meruelo announced that it would relocate the KDAY studios to Burbank alongside KPWR. Under Meruelo ownership, KDAY and KDEY-FM refocused their programming on classic hip hop and rhythmic throwbacks to avoid overlap.

== History of the 93.5 FM frequency in Los Angeles ==
The station at 93.5 FM, licensed to Redondo Beach, California, signed on in 1961 as KAPP-FM and was owned by South Bay Broadcasting Company. The license was granted after the applications for KPOL-FM and KNX-FM were denied. Chuck Johnson and Lonnie Cook came to KAPP-FM from KTYM-FM (103.9 FM) in Inglewood. The frequency was shared as the signal's programming came from Redondo Beach in the daytime, and the pop, blues, doo wop, and jazz format being aired by Johnson and Cook (from Johnson's home) at night. It has been determined that their FM top 40 chart is the oldest one known to exist.

The station changed its callsign to KKOP with its sale to Southern California Associated Newspapers in 1965 and began playing mellow pop music. The transmitter moved to Torrance in the 1970s. In 1978, KKOP became KFOX-FM upon its sale to the former operators of KFOX at 1280 AM. Like its predecessor, KFOX-FM played country music. The format in the early 1980s was an adult contemporary hit music station. In 1981–1982, KFOX-FM employed Los Angeles' youngest disc jockey at the time, a 16-year-old student from Torrance High School, Brett Nordhoff, who later changed his on-air name to Kidd Kelly.

By 1983, KFOX-FM had evolved into a multi-ethnic, multilingual format such as Radio Rangarang (Persian), Radio Omid (Persian), and Radio Naeeri (Armenian). In the mid-1990s, this became "Radio Korea USA" with an all-Korean format. This continued until 1999, when the International Church of the Foursquare Gospel (ICFG) moved the KFSG call letters and Christian radio format to 93.5 FM. This switch was a condition of selling KXOL-FM (96.3 FM), acquired by Spanish Broadcasting System specifically for the purpose of relocating KFSG. In 2002, the lease arrangement with the ICFG ended and SBS switched KFSG to a Spanish-language outlet, first as KMJR ("La Mejor") and later KZAB as La Sabrosa.
