= ABL Corporation =

International conglomerate

- Type: Privately held company
- Industry: Conglomerate
- Founded: 2014
- Headquarters: Dublin, Ireland
- Area served: Worldwide
- Key people: Ali Ben Lmadani (Founder and Chief Executive Officer); Donal O Shea (Chief Technical Officer); Stephen Orr (Senior Vice President Africa); Joey Zhao (Head of Asia-Pacific, ex-Japan); Umid Sharipov (Managing Director, Relationship Management)
- Website: ablcorporation.com

ABL Corporation is an independent, family-owned global conglomerate with interests in real asset industries, including aviation, maritime, hospitality, agriculture, and real estate. Founded and led by Ali Ben Lmadani, the group has deployed over $8 billion in capital across its subsidiaries. ABL Corporation has offices in New York, Dublin, Casablanca, Dubai, Hong Kong, Tokyo, and Manila.

== Overview ==
ABL Corporation was founded by Ali Ben Lmadani, a Moroccan-American-Irish entrepreneur and investment banker. The group operates as a private, independent platform across multiple real asset sectors, with a focus on long-term value creation, disciplined capital deployment, and institutional-grade investment management. Its primary subsidiaries are ABL Aviation, ABL Industries, ABL Maritime, ABL Hospitality, ABL Agri, ABL Botanicals, and ABL Real Estate.

== Subsidiary companies ==
=== ABL Aviation ===
ABL Aviation is a subsidiary and independent global full-service aircraft asset management firm that provides tailored leasing and servicing solutions to aircraft investors and lessees, focusing on commercial aircraft. The company was founded in December 2014 by Ali Ben Lmadani in New York City, with the vision of creating the independent global asset manager of choice for investors seeking exposure to aviation assets.

The firm's headquarters are located in Dublin, Ireland, with additional offices in Casablanca, Morocco, Tokyo, Japan, Hong Kong, China, Dubai, UAE, and Manila, Philippines. ABL Aviation manages multi-billion-dollar assets on behalf of institutional investors, pension funds, and financial partners across Asia, Europe, the Middle East, and the Americas. The firm has completed 116 aircraft transactions and deployed over $7.3 billion in capital, with airline partners including Lufthansa, Air France, Turkish Airlines, Delta Air Lines, American Airlines, Wizz Air, and Emirates.

In 2018, ABL Aviation secured an exclusive 10-year partnership with a Tokyo Stock Exchange and Osaka Securities Exchange-listed financial institution, providing $1 billion in permanent capital dedicated to aircraft acquisitions. In 2025, this partnership was extended into a 25-year long-term joint venture.

During the COVID-19 pandemic, in April 2020, ABL Aviation completed what was reported as the industry's first 100 percent electronic aircraft delivery — an Airbus A321neo to Pegasus Airlines — and the industry's first AFS debt-backed JOLCO structure. Throughout the pandemic, the company maintained a track record of no investor losses and closed over 30 aircraft transactions.

Notable recent mandates include a 15-aircraft Airbus A220-300 mandate with Air France (concluded 2025), a six-aircraft Airbus A350-900 mandate with Emirates (2025), and a six-aircraft Boeing 737-8 MAX mandate with Copa Airlines (initiated 2025, ongoing into 2026). In October 2024, ABL Aviation arranged a €170 million ground support equipment financing facility for Swissport International AG, described as the first-ever global secured financing for a ground support equipment operator.

ABL Aviation serves as a Strategic Partner of the International Air Transport Association (IATA) and is a sponsor of the IATA Annual General Meeting (AGM) and World Air Transport Summit (WATS). The company is also a key sponsor of ISTAT Americas, ISTAT EMEA, and ISTAT Asia, as well as the Airline Economics Growth Frontiers conference series worldwide.

=== ABL Industries ===
ABL Industries was the first venture founded by Ali Ben Lmadani, initially focused on sourcing and exporting airport ground support equipment (GSE) from the United States to operators in Europe and Africa. What began as a trading activity evolved into a structured aviation services platform built on technical understanding and cross-border execution.

In 2025, ABL Industries launched aircraft Maintenance, Repair, and Overhaul (MRO) operations at Midparc Casablanca. The facility provides FAA and EASA-aligned MRO services specialising in 5B and 7B thrust reverser systems, radome overhaul and repair, flight control component maintenance, rotable pool solutions, and mid-life and end-of-lease technical support. The facility is designed to serve airlines, lessors, and investors across Africa, the Middle East, and Europe, reinforcing Morocco's position as an emerging aerospace hub.

=== ABL Maritime ===
ABL Maritime is a subsidiary that provides asset management services in the shipping sector, including sourcing, structuring, and restructuring transactions focusing on Japanese maritime investment markets. ABL Maritime applies the same disciplined investment framework developed in aviation to maritime assets, focusing on risk-adjusted returns, structured leasing solutions, and cross-border capital deployment. In August 2023, the company partnered with AMA Capital Partners, a New York-based investment bank.

=== ABL Agri and ABL Botanicals ===
ABL Agri is a subsidiary focused on agricultural investment for the future, supporting farmers and horticulturalists in producing safe, high-quality products. In 2024, Ali Ben Lmadani co-founded ABL Agri and ABL Botanicals alongside his wife, Carina Ben Lmadani.

ABL Botanicals supplies premium Moroccan botanicals and essential oils to partners in the cosmetics, fragrance, and wellness industries across Europe, the Middle East, and Asia. The company cultivates more than 25 aromatic and medicinal plants across 300 hectares of certified organic farmland near Marrakech, operating under chemical-free agricultural practices. ABL Botanicals integrates traceability, sustainability, and export-grade processing standards into its operations, positioning Morocco as a high-quality source market for global brands.

=== ABL Hospitality and Morocco Welcome ===
ABL Hospitality (previously operating as EasyGuests) is a subsidiary that operates in the hospitality industry and manages investments in hospitality assets, including hotel management, operations, and tourism. EasyGuests was originally founded in 2015 as a short-term rental property management company operating across five cities in the United States and Europe, before being sold to a strategic competitor in 2021.

In 2025, ABL Hospitality launched Morocco Welcome, a boutique destination management company based in Marrakech focused on curated, high-end travel experiences. Rather than standard tourism packages, the company designs tailored journeys combining private residences, luxury transport, cultural immersion, and architectural heritage, with the aim of elevating Morocco's positioning as a refined global travel destination.

=== ABL Real Estate ===
ABL Real Estate is a subsidiary that operates in the real estate sector across commercial and residential properties. The firm focuses on disciplined acquisitions in prime residential and mixed-use assets across Paris, London, Dubai, and Miami, with an emphasis on long-term value creation. Its portfolio includes repositioning strategies, yield optimization, and structured co-investment vehicles for private investors.

== Recognition ==
ABL Aviation, ABL Corporation's flagship subsidiary, has received numerous industry awards including:

- Aviation 100 Supported Finance Deal of the Year 2019 — Airline Economics
- Editor's Deal of the Year 2022 — AFJ Awards
- Aviation 100 New Fund of the Year 2022 — Airline Economics
- Americas JOL Deal of the Year 2022 — Airline Economics
- Best Institutional Product/Strategy 2022 — AsianInvestor Asset Management Awards
- Real Assets and Infrastructure Industry Innovation Award 2022 — CIO Magazine
- Most Innovative Asset Management Firm 2023 and 2024 — Corporate Livewire
- Best Investment Management Company in Ireland 2023 — World Finance Investment Management
- Company of the Year in Aircraft Leasing and Financing 2023 — Aircraft Defense Review
- Aviation 100 JOLCO Deal of the Year 2024 — Airline Economics
- Best Independent Asset Management Aircraft Firm Ireland 2024 — Global Business and Finance Magazine
- Aircraft Leasing Company of the Year and Innovative Aviation Finance Deal of the Year 2025 — Aviation Achievement Awards
- Outstanding Sustainability Initiative – Aviation 2025 — MEA Business Achievement Awards
- Structured Finance Deal of the Year — Airline Economics Dubai 2025
- Structured Finance Deal of the Year — Airline Economics Dublin 2026
