= Xiaolan Bao =

Burmese-American historian, professor, and researcher (1949–2006)

- Born: 1949; Rangoon, Burma
- Died: January 22, 2006 (aged 56–57)

Academic background
- Education: Beijing Teachers College; Jinan University; New York University

Academic work
- Discipline: history
- Sub-discipline: Asian American history labor history
- Institutions: Albion College; California State University Long Beach
- Notable works: Holding Up More Than Half the Sky: Chinese Women Garment Workers in New York City

Xiaolan Bao (1949 – January 22, 2006) was a Burmese American historian, educator, and researcher. She was the author of the 2001 book, Holding Up More Than Half the Sky: Chinese Women Garment Workers in New York City, which is regarded as a breakthrough work of Asian American labor history. Her academic field was Chinese and Chinese American women's history and labor history.

== Early life and education ==
Bao was born and raised in Rangoon, Burma. In 1975 she completed her B.A. at Beijing Teachers College, followed by an M.A. from Jinan University in 1981. In 1984 she continued her studies at New York University, where she earned a Ph.D. in history in 1991. She continued her research on New York-based Chinese women garment workers after she completed her doctoral work. Bao spoke Burmese, English, Mandarin, Taishanese, and several other dialects of Cantonese.

== Career ==
Bao's first teaching position was at Albion College from 1991 to 1993. Next, she was a professor of history at California State University Long Beach during the period 1993 to 1996. Her 2001 book, Holding Up More Than Half the Sky, Chinese Women Garment Workers in New York City, 1948–92, is noted as an important and breakthrough work by many scholars in her field, particularly because it focused on labor history of Asian Americans.

Bao was also the founder of the US-based international organization, Chinese Society for Women's Studies (CSWS). She and Wu Xu were organizers of several collaborations between the CSWS and various Chinese institutions, and were funded by the Ford Foundation. These included the 1993 First Chinese Women and Development Conference co-sponsored with the Center for Women's Studies at Tianjin Normal University, which focused on the concept of gender and led to the publishing of a number of works, including Bao's Xifang nüxing zhuyi pingjie (On Western Feminist Research), which was influential in feminist circles in China. In 1997, in Nanjing, participants in the Second Chinese Women and Development Conference sought to identify and integrate appropriate contemporary Western feminist thought into Chinese scholarship. Finally, in 1998, Bao and Xu collaborated with the Sichuan Women's Federation Women's Studies Institute to bring together gender studies scholars and development specialists knowledgeable about China at the Gender, Poverty and Rural Development Participatory Workshop in Chengdu.

== Death ==
Bao died of breast cancer in 2006. The Xiaolan Bao Memorial Scholarship, honoring research on Asian or Asian American women, is named in her honor.

== Selected works ==
- Bao, Xiaolan (1994). "When Women Arrived: The Transformation of New York's Chinatown". Not June Cleaver: Women and Gender in Postwar America, 1945–1960. Philadelphia, Pennsylvania: Temple University Press. ISBN 9781566391702.
- Bao, Xiaolan, ed. (1995). Xifang niixingzhuyi yanjiu pingjie [An introduction to Western feminist scholarship]. Beijing: Sanlian Bookstore.
- Bao, Xiaolan (2001). Holding Up More Than Half the Sky: Chinese Women Garment Workers in New York City, 1948–92. Urbana: University of Illinois Press. ISBN 9780252026317.
- Bao, Xiaolan (2003). "Sweatshops in Sunset Park: A Variation of the Late-Twentieth-Century Chinese Garment Shops in New York City". Sweatshop USA: The American Sweatshop in Historical and Global Perspective. New York: Routledge. ISBN 9780415935609.
- Bao, Xiaolan (2003). "Revisiting New York's Chinatown, 1900–1930". Remapping Asian American History. Walnut Creek, California: AltaMira Press. ISBN 9780759104792.
- Bao, Xiaolan (2003). "Politicizing Motherhood: Chinese Garment Workers' Campaign For Daycare Centers in New York City, 1977–1982". Asian/Pacific Islander American Women: A Historical Anthology. New York: New York University Press. ISBN 9780814736326.
- Bao, Xiaolan (2005). How Did Chinese Women Garment Workers in New York City Forge a Successful Class-Based Coalition During the 1982 Contract Dispute? (Document). Binghamton, New York: State University of New York. OCLC 469854165.
