= Alex Meruelo =

American businessman

- Born: March 27, 1964 (age 62); New York City, U.S.
- Education: California State University, Long Beach
- Occupations: Owner of Meruelo Group; Owner of Tucson Roadrunners (AHL); Owner of KWHY; Owner of KLOS, KLLI, KPWR, KDAY and KDEY-FM; Owner of Fuji Food; Owner of Grand Sierra Resort; Owner of Sahara Las Vegas; Owner of Colom Island
- Spouse: Liset Meruelo
- Children: 3

Alex Meruelo (born March 27, 1964) is an American billionaire who holds business interests in banking, real estate, media, restaurants, food, casinos, and professional sports. He is the owner of Meruelo Group, as well as Meruelo Media, which owns five radio stations and one television station in Los Angeles.

He is also the owner of Fuji Food, two casinos, the Grand Sierra Resort in Reno, Nevada and the Sahara Las Vegas in Las Vegas. Meruelo was the majority owner of the Arizona Coyotes of the National Hockey League until he sold the team to the league, which then sold the team to Utah Jazz owner Ryan Smith, under an agreement with the NHL that the Coyotes would be temporarily deactivated, with Smith using the Coyotes' non-business properties, including players and staff, to form the Utah Mammoth.

Meruelo forfeited his ownership of the Arizona Coyotes after the Arizona State Land Department canceled an auction for a 110-acre tract of land in north Phoenix. Meruelo was seeking the land for a new arena.

== Biography ==
Meruelo was born in New York City. His parents were accountants who fled the Castro regime. His family moved to Los Angeles, California, where they held a bridal shop and invested in local real estate. He also started to invest in real estate at an early age, and eventually sold a plot of land in Riverside to Walmart, making him a millionaire in his early 20s.

Meruelo attended the Don Bosco Technical Institute in Rosemead, California, and received his B.S. from California State University, Long Beach.

== Career ==
Meruelo began his career in his father's tuxedo business. At the age of 23, he decided to open a new type of pizza restaurant catering to Latinos in the US and offering unusual toppings such as chorizo and jalapeños. He bought a failing pizza restaurant and called his new business La Pizza Loca. Within 5 years, La Pizza Loca opened 12 locations and reached $10 million in sales.

Meruelo expanded his business focus, founding the Meruelo Group, which has grown into a construction and real estate development firm. Meruelo Group has ownership of Neal Electric Corp, Select Electric Inc., and Doty Bros within the Southern California area. The group also owns the Commercial Bank of California. which Meruelo co-founded in 2003, television station KWHY, radio stations KLOS, KLLI, KPWR, KDAY and KDEY-FM under the Meruelo Media banner, and the Grand Sierra Resort in Reno, Nevada.

Meruelo purchased food manufacturer and the largest provider and distributor of pre-packaged sushi in the United States Fuji Food in 2009.

In September 2011, Meruelo announced a $25 million investment in the renovation of the Grand Sierra Resort in Reno, Nevada.

In February 2013, the Meruelo Group made a bid to buy Donald Trump's Trump Plaza Hotel and Casino for $20 million. The deal fell through and the casino closed the following year.

The SLS Las Vegas (formerly the Sahara Hotel and Casino) in Las Vegas, Nevada, was purchased by the Meruelo Group in June 2017. Alex Meruelo plans to turn the casino into a favorite destination for the Hispanic community. Meruelo plans to use its media properties to advertise the casino and its events. In May 2019, SLS brand owner SBE Hotel Licensing, LLC filed a lawsuit alleging that Meruelo's Las Vegas Resort Holdings, LLC had failed to pay at least $450,000 in licensing fees since November 2018. On June 28, 2019, The Meruelo Group and Alex Meruelo announced plans to rename the SLS Hotel as The Sahara Las Vegas. On August 29, 2019, the Meruelo Group officially changed the name of the SLS Hotel to Sahara Las Vegas.

== Professional sports ==
In November 2011, Meruelo's bid to take ownership of the Atlanta Hawks of the National Basketball Association from the team's then-owners Atlanta Spirit was turned down. The team was later sold to Tony Ressler in 2015. In June 2019, he purchased majority ownership of the Arizona Coyotes of the National Hockey League from the previous sole owner Andrew Barroway who retained a minority stake. With his purchase of the Coyotes, Meruelo became the first Latino owner in the NHL. On March 27, 2023 NHL commissioner Gary Bettman announced that he would become the sole owner of the Arizona Coyotes after Andrew Barroway was indefinitely banned from the league after being arrested for the alleged strangulation of his wife.

After a turbulent tenure as owner (including the team being kicked out of Gila River Arena following a series of rental disputes, forcing the team to relocate to Mullett Arena, which seats just a minuscule 4,600, while working on efforts to build their own arenas, including the aborted New Tempe Arena plans), on April 18, 2024, the NHL and Meruelo reached an agreement to sell the Coyotes' assets to Smith Entertainment Group, current owners of the Utah Jazz, and move the team's personnel to Salt Lake City. As part of the agreement, the team would be declared "dormant" as Meruelo would continue with his efforts to build a new arena, with Meruelo becoming owner of a reactivated Coyotes team should he succeed in building the arena by the end of 2029, but would return all remaining Coyotes assets to the league should he fail by the end of the window. Just 10 days prior, it was proclaimed that a bid for 110 acres (44.5 hectares) north of Phoenix at an upcoming land auction was still in the works. On April 17, 2024, the Coyotes played their final game before deactivation at Mullett Arena, beating the Edmonton Oilers 5-2 without Meruelo in attendance. On June 21, 2024, the Arizona State Land Department announced the cancellation of the auction. Stating that "ASLD recently confirmed that the proposed arena use will require a Special Use Permit, and as a result we are requesting that the applicant file for and receive a Special Use Permit prior to the auction."

== Real estate ==
In May 2008, Meruelo purchased an 8,500-square-foot, $7.05 million house at 36 Indian Creek Drive in Miami. In March 2014, he acquired a $10.79 million penthouse in The Langham, New York. In June 2018, he purchased Colom Island in Spain for 3.2 million euros.

In June 2021, Meruelo purchased a 22,000-square-foot, $12.1 million house in Paradise Valley, AZ.

Sporting positions
Preceded by Andrew Barroway	Arizona Coyotes owner 2019–2024	Position inactive
