= KBLA =

- Santa Monica, California; United States
- Broadcast area: Greater Los Angeles
- Frequency: 1580 kHz
- Branding: KBLA 1580 AM Talk Radio

Programming
- Format: Urban/progressive talk
- Affiliations: Black Information Network; Compass Media Networks

Ownership
- Owner: Multicultural Broadcasting; (Multicultural Radio Broadcasting Licensee, LLC)
- Operator: Tavis Smiley (Smiley Radio Properties, Inc.)

History
- First air date: July 30, 1947
- Former call signs: KOWL (1947–1956); KDAY (1956–1991)
- Call sign meaning: Former business news format, now a backronym for current Black audience

Technical information
- Licensing authority: FCC
- Facility ID: 34385
- Class: B
- Power: 50,000 watts
- Transmitter coordinates: 34°5′8″N 118°15′27.3″W

Links
- Public license information: Public file; LMS
- Webcast: Listen live
- Website: kbla1580.com

KBLA (1580 AM) is a broadcast radio station in the United States. Licensed to Santa Monica, California, KBLA serves the Greater Los Angeles area. The station is owned by Multicultural Broadcasting, through licensee Multicultural Radio Broadcasting Licensee, LLC, and operated by pending owner Tavis Smiley with an urban/progressive talk format.

For much of its early history, the station had music formats and was aimed towards a black audience. The station was founded in 1947 as KOWL and played middle of the road music; Gene Autry was an early investor in the station. From 1956 to 1991, the station had call sign KDAY and had top 40, rock, and R&B formats through the early 1980s. In 1983, KDAY became the first station in Los Angeles to play hip hop music; as a result, KDAY became the most popular station among black listeners in the area.

KDAY went through multiple ownership and format changes in the 1990s, beginning with a purchase by Fred Sands in 1990. A year later, KDAY changed its call sign to KBLA and its format to business news. The business format lasted just one year, as KBLA changed to a Korean format afterwards. Keymarket Communications purchased KBLA in 1993; subsequent mergers of its parent company landed KBLA under the ownership of River City Broadcasting in 1995 and Sinclair Broadcast Group in 1996. KBLA was sold in 1998 to Radio Unica, which added KBLA to its national Spanish radio network. Multicultural Broadcasting bought KBLA in 2003 and converted KBLA to a Spanish Christian format. Tavis Smiley bought KBLA in 2020 and launched a progressive talk format on the station.

== History ==
=== As KOWL (1947–1956) ===
Originally, the station at 1580 kHz made its first broadcast on July 30, 1947, as KOWL, a 5,000-watt, daytime-only station licensed to Santa Monica. It was owned and operated by Arthur H. Croghan, formerly the commercial manager for WJBK in Detroit. The opening day celebration for KOWL on August 10 included such notable figures as Los Angeles Mayor Fletcher Bowron, Santa Monica Mayor Mark T. Gates, country singer Gene Autry, and actress Marilyn Monroe. However, KOWL broadcast for only six and a half hours that day due to technicians walking out of the job due to a dispute over unionization.

KOWL's studios were located at the Ambassador Hotel in Santa Monica. It had a middle of the road music format. Croghan excluded what he called "commercial religion, disc jockeys, murder mysteries, double spotting, over-commercialism, and...talk exceeding five minutes except in rare instances." In 1948, Autry became a minority owner of KOWL, and the station began orienting its music and programming towards black listeners. Autry sold back his stake in KOWL to Croghan for $80,000 in October 1949.

=== As KDAY (1956–1991) ===
==== Early history (1956–1966) ====
On May 1, 1956, KOWL changed its call sign to KDAY, a nod to its daytime-only broadcast hours. KDAY changed its format to mainstream pop music, as shown by surveys from the time.

In January 1957, Radio California purchased KDAY and Corona TV station KCOA for $650,000. KDAY's studios and business offices moved from Santa Monica to Hollywood in April 1957. KDAY began carrying newscasts from the Los Angeles Herald-Express newsroom in July 1957.

From 1958 to 1961, Earl McDaniel was a DJ at KDAY. where he was soon joined by Art Laboe. Alan Freed worked for KDAY for about a year beginning in 1960 after losing his job at WABC in New York City over the payola scandal.

In April 1962, Rollins Broadcasting (later Continental Broadcasting of California) purchased KDAY for $850,000 in addition to a $150,000 non-compete clause. Rollins changed the music format to R&B.

==== Adult standards, top 40, and return to R&B (1966–1983) ====
Beginning July 22, 1966, KDAY changed its format to adult standards where DJs played songs by telephone requests; Mexican station XERB in Tijuana picked up KDAY's old R&B format around a week later.

In the late 1960s, KDAY received approval from the Federal Communications Commission (FCC) to operate at night. The studio and transmitter site were moved to a new facility on North Alvarado Street north of downtown Los Angeles. In early 1969, KDAY changed to top 40 and became a member of the ABC Radio Network, then to album-oriented rock (AOR) in 1971. During the Top 40 and AOR eras, the station was programmed by Bob Wilson, who would later launch the media magazine Radio & Records. KDAY reverted to soul/R&B in January 1974.

In 1978, KDAY had the highest ratings among the four black radio stations in Los Angeles, ahead of KACE, KJLH, and KKTT. For a Billboard profile that year, KDAY program director J.J. Johnson said the station had an "uptempo approach" to music; the station's slogan at the time was "We got the funk!"

==== Addition of hip hop (1983–1991) ====
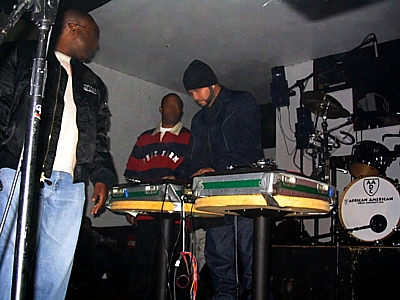
Former KDAY radio personality Greg Mack (far left) and "mixmaster" DJ Julio G (center) at the KDAY AM 1580 20th anniversary in 2003.

Facing tougher competition from FM stations like KJLH, KDAY became the first Los Angeles radio station to play hip hop music in 1983. Under new program director and disc jockey Gregory "Greg The Mack Attack" MacMillan, hired from KMJQ in Houston, added hip hop to the station's playlist to appeal to mostly young Black and Latino listeners. DJ Dr. Dre and DJ Yella Boy became the first mixer DJs at the station. By September 1983, KDAY upgraded its sound to AM stereo. Dan Charnas described that move as "laughable" and "sounding like two tiny AM radios playing side by side."

Some of Def Jam's most iconic and legendary acts such as Run-D.M.C., Beastie Boys, Whodini, The Fat Boys, E.P.M.D., 3rd Bass, and Public Enemy have dominated the hip hop scene, KDAY brought their music to a new audience on the West Coast. In 1987, Compton-based gangsta rap group N.W.A made its radio debut on KDAY. In the first ratings period under MacMillan's leadership, KDAY's ratings beat another Los Angeles black AM station, KGFJ, and "began to enjoy a second life as the only rap-friendly station in town and, frankly, in the entire country."

KDAY raised awareness about the growing problem of gang violence in Los Angeles. Lee Marshall, known on-air as "King News", gave news and commentaries relevant to the African-American and Hispanic communities, often warning about the troubles caused by gangs. After violence in the stands forced the cancellation of a Run-DMC concert at the Long Beach Arena for the group's Raising Hell tour, KDAY organized a "Day of Peace" on October 9, 1986. In a two-hour special, KDAY featured Run-DMC, singer Barry White, and boxer Paul Gonzales appealing to rival gangs to stop feuding and opened phone lines for callers to describe gangs' impact in their communities. There were no murders or incidents of gang violence that day. Within two weeks, the Bloods and Crips, the two largest gangs in Los Angeles, signed a peace treaty.

In 1990, MacMillan left KDAY to work for FM rival KJLH. That same year, realtor Fred Sands, who also owned iconic heavy metal station KNAC, bought KDAY for $7.2 million. On March 28, 1991, at 1 p.m., after playing “Turn Off the Lights” by Teddy Pendergrass, KDAY ended its music format, and went silent for nearly three weeks.

As a tribute to the original AM station, Redondo Beach FM station KZAB changed its call sign to KDAY and format to classic hip hop in September 2004 in a simulcast with KDAI in Riverside.

=== KBLA (1991–present) ===
KDAY became KBLA on April 5, 1991, with the station signing back on the air with a flip to a business news format branded "Business News L.A." on April 17. Among its new programming was Cynic's Choice, a British comedy revue hosted by Brian Clewer that moved to KBLA in August 1991.

The business format lasted just one year; KBLA changed to a Korean format branded "Radio Korea" in January 1992. KBLA also broadcast seven Los Angeles Dodgers games a year in Korean; when Chan Ho Park joined the team in 1994, KBLA began broadcasting games where he pitched. KBLA expanded its Dodgers coverage to 60 games in 1998.

Nearly a year after the 1992 riots on May 1, 1993, KBLA and KJLH broadcast Bridging the Gap, a special joint call-in program aiming to improve relations between the black and Korean communities.

Also in 1993, Keymarket Communications purchased KBLA and KNAC from Sands for $12.1 million.

By 1995, KBLA broadcast two hours of English talk and music programs nightly to appeal to Korean Americans who do not speak Korean. Also in 1995, River City Broadcasting purchased Keymarket Communications and its radio stations including KBLA for over $130 million total. Sinclair Broadcast Group owned KBLA beginning in 1996 when River City merged with Sinclair.

KBLA reporter Richard Choi was convicted of slander and fined US$1,800 by a South Korean court in February 1998 after reporting on alleged economic troubles of The Korea Times, which owned a competing Korean station in Los Angeles.

In May 1998, Radio Unica purchased KBLA for $21 million and added the station to its national Spanish network of the same name.

In 2003, Multicultural Broadcasting purchased KBLA and 14 other stations for a total $150 million. Among its new programs were Todo para la Mujer, a Mexican radio program hosted by Maxine Woodside.

On March 31, 2004, KBLA became the original West Coast affiliate of Air America Radio, airing talk shows hosted by Al Franken, Randi Rhodes, and Janeane Garofalo among others. On April 14, the shows were no longer available due to a payment dispute between Air America and Multicultural Broadcasting. KTLK became the Air America affiliate for Los Angeles in 2005.

Branded "Radio Zion" with offices in Downey, KBLA changed to a Spanish Christian format on September 16, 2004. Radio Zion moved to XESURF-AM in Tijuana in September 2009. The Spanish Christian format continued through 2020 under other brands, most recently "Radio Esperanza".

In November 2020, Tavis Smiley, former talk show host on BET and PBS, purchased KBLA for $7.15 million. Although the license assignment was not yet complete, the station began broadcasting on June 19, 2021. A three-hour program introduced the talk show hosts and repeated until 6 AM June 21, 2021, at which time KBLA began live programming. Elston Howard Butler, former manager of Los Angeles urban contemporary FM station KJLH, is KBLA's president and general manager.

== Technical information ==
KBLA broadcasts with a power of 50,000 watts day and night, using a complex directional antenna utilizing six towers. The transmitter is off North Alvarado Street, near Glendale Boulevard, in Los Angeles. Because 1580 AM is a Canadian clear channel frequency, KBLA's signal is directional at night.
