= KFI-FM =

Radio station in Los Angeles, California (1946–1951)

KFI-FM was a short-lived FM broadcasting station, licensed to Los Angeles, California. It was the first station with a transmitter located on Mount Wilson. The station began test programs in 1946 and only lasted until 1951, when the owner, Earle C. Anthony, decided to shut down operations and return the license to the Federal Communications Commission (FCC). This was because relatively few persons had FM receivers, and owners saw a limited future for FM operations.

== History ==
Radio station KFI (AM) officials broke ground on November 29, 1944, at the Mount Wilson site, for construction of an FM and TV center. This ceremony was broadcast by KFI at AM 640 from noon to 12:15 p.m. KFI-FM was assigned to 105.9 MHz, and began testing in July 1946, although other histories state that the station began operations in 1947.

KFI-FM used a General Electric 3 kW Phasotron transmitter with a 2-bay antenna, that provided an effective radiated power (ERP) of 10,000 watts. The 1951 Broadcasting Yearbook listed KFI-FM's power as 16,500 watts.

Through 1948 and 1949, KFI-FM featured music programs that were separate from the broadcasts by KFI. A December 1949 listing in the Los Angeles Times for KFI-FM's 3 to 9 p.m. schedule included titles such as Afternoon Melodies, Classics, Music For You, Symphony Moods and World of Music. By 1950, KFI-FM was simulcasting KFI (AM). The Los Angeles Times reported that KFI-FM and five other local FM stations that simulcast AM station programs generally broadcast from 6 a.m. to midnight, the same as their originating AM stations, with at least three other FM stations carrying their own programs. A majority of the FM stations only broadcast from mid-afternoon to about 9 p.m.

In addition to the region's first FM station, KHJ-FM, which signed on in 1941, additional pioneer Los Angeles region FM stations debuting in 1946 included non-commercial stations KUSC at 91.5 and KCRW at 89.9. KFI-FM and KMPC-FM began operations by 1947. 1948 and 1949 debuts included KNX-FM at 93.1, KWIK-FM in Burbank at 94.3, KFMV in Hollywood at 94.7, KECA-FM at 95.5, KRKD-FM at 96.3, KVOE-FM in Santa Ana at 96.7, KKLA (owned by KFSG 1150) at 97.1, KAGH-FM in Pasadena at 98.3, KMGM (owned by the movie studio) at 98.7, KMPC-FM at 100.3, KNOB in Long Beach at 103.1 (moved to 97.9 by 1958), KFAC-FM at 104.3 (moved to 92.3 by 1955), and KCLI, owned by the founders of KIEV 870 in Glendale, at 105.1.

While FM audio quality was significantly better than AM stations, AM-FM combination radios were expensive and FM stereo wasn't introduced until 1961. By 1950, KCLI and KMPC-FM had been deleted. KFI-FM was included in the 1951 Broadcasting Yearbook, but disappeared from newspaper radio logs by mid-1951, and was not included in the 1952 Broadcasting Yearbook.

KFI-FM only existed for approximately five years. The station's license was not transferred to a new owner, as Earle C. Anthony shut it down on April 5, 1951, and returned the license to the FCC for deletion. A new license for 105.9 MHz in Los Angeles was issued in 1956 for KBMS (Better Music Station), with an original community of license of Glendale. This new station had no link to the deleted KFI-FM, and is currently KPWR.

== See also ==
- KFI-TV, which operated during 1948–1951, later became KHJ-TV, and has been KCAL-TV since 1989
