= Colom Island =

Island in Spain

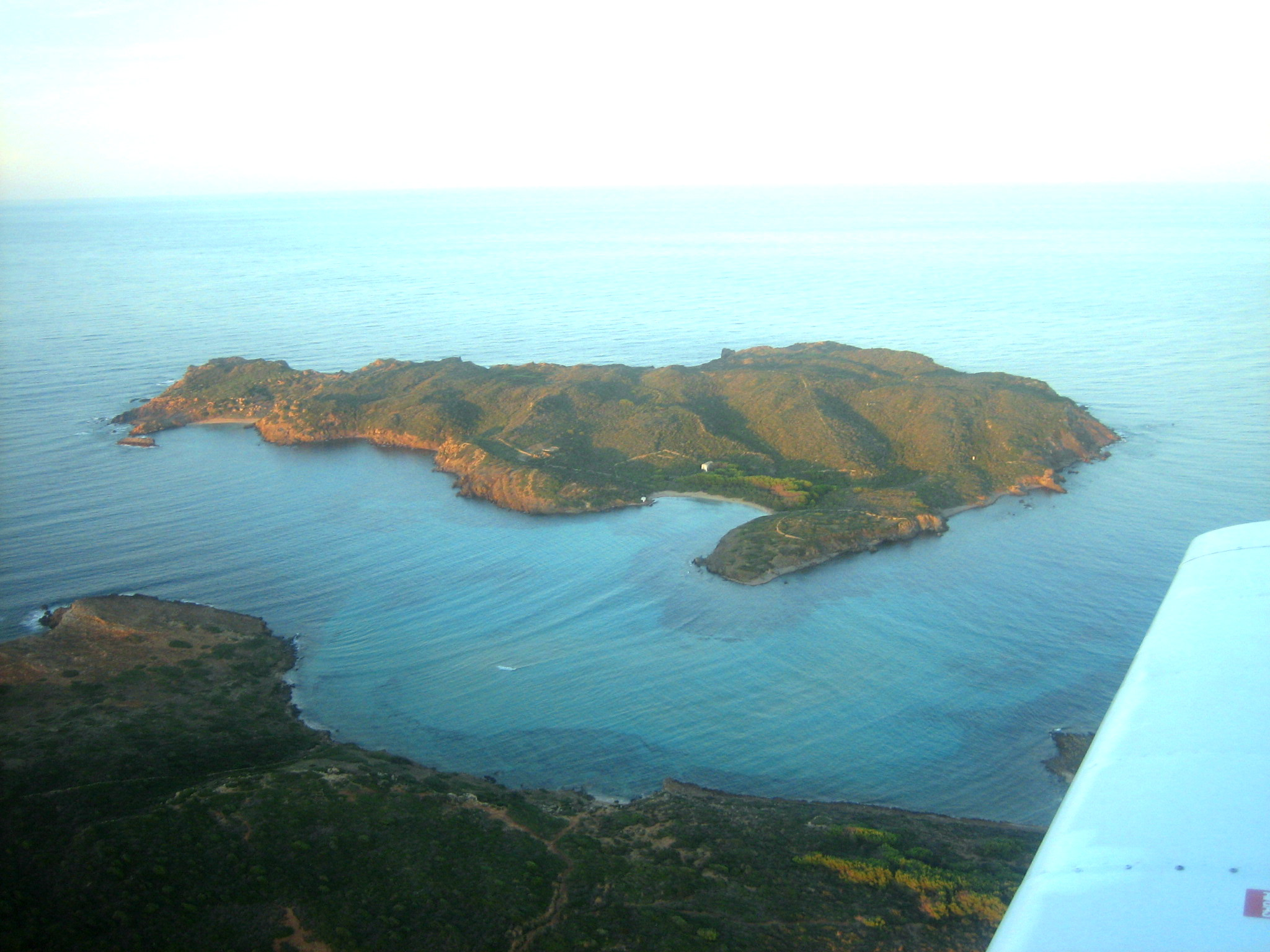
- Colom Island, Menorca

- Location in Spain

Geography
- Coordinates: 39.958°N 4.278°E
- Archipelago: Baleric Islands
- Area: 0.5787 km^{2} (0.2234 sq mi)

Administration
- Spain

Colom Island (Catalan: Illa d'en Colom) is a small island of 143 acres (0.58 km^{2}), located about 200 metres (656 ft) from the north-east coast of Menorca. In the past it was used as a pesthouse and later as farmland. It belonged to the Roca family from Mahón starting in 1904, when it was bought by Mr. Antonio Roca Várez. There is a single 100 square meter home on the island. It is currently part of the Natural Park of the Albufera of Es Grau.

== Sale ==
In October 2010 it was announced that the island was being sold for roughly €6 million. It sold for €3.2 million in 2018 to American billionaire Alex Meruelo.
