= Linda Burhansstipanov =

Researcher

- Citizenship: Cherokee Nation and U.S.
- Education: California State University, Long Beach; University of California, Los Angeles
- Medical career
- Institutions: California State University, Long Beach

Linda Burhansstipanov is a Native American public health educator and researcher. She is a citizen of the Cherokee Nation who specializes on cancer care and support in Native American communities. A leader in Native American cancer research, she is the founder and president of the Native American Cancer Research Corporation, a non-profit organization that studies how the unique situations of Native Americans interact with cancer treatment. She is also a member of the National Institutes of Health national advisory council on Minority Health and Health Disparities. Native American communities have distinctive cultural beliefs and communicative practices, and are often impacted by social determinants of health related to poverty and associated public health concerns. Burnhansstipanov has worked on a broad array of research projects related to how such factors shape community's understandings of cancer and treatment. She is also an expert on Community-based participatory research, which aims to empower communities as equal participants in the research process and has published several articles using this methodology.

After teaching at California State University, Long Beach for 18 years, she worked for National Institutes of Health from 1989-1993 to develop the Native American Cancer Research Program. After working as a researcher and program advisor for two years, she started the Native American Cancer Research Corporation.
