= KDEY-FM =

Radio station in Ontario, California

Simulcast of KDAY, Redondo Beach, CA
- Ontario, California; United States
- Broadcast area: Inland Empire
- Frequency: 93.5 MHz (HD Radio)
- Branding: 93.5 KDAY (pronounced "Ninety–Three Five, K–Day")

Programming
- Format: Classic hip hop
- Affiliations: Compass Media Networks

Ownership
- Owner: Meruelo Group; (Meruello Radio Holdings Ltd.)
- Sister stations: KDAY; KLLI; KLOS; KPWR; KWHY

History
- First air date: 1947
- Former call signs: KREA (1993–2000); KNJR (2000–2001); KFSB (2001–2003); KZBA (2003–2004); KDAI (2004–2007); KWIE (2007–2009)
- Call sign meaning: Similar to KDAY

Technical information
- Licensing authority: FCC
- Facility ID: 10099
- Class: A
- ERP: 5,000 watts
- HAAT: −40 meters (−130 ft)
- Transmitter coordinates: 34°10′32″N 117°34′26″W

Links
- Public license information: Public file; LMS
- Webcast: Listen live
- Website: 935kday.com

KDEY-FM (93.5 FM, "93.5 KDAY") is a commercial radio station licensed to serve Ontario, California, owned by Meruelo Radio Holdings Ltd. It broadcasts a classic hip hop format. KDEY-FM's transmitter is located on Heaven Mountain to the north of Ontario, it simulcasts with co-channel station KDAY in Redondo Beach, California, to fill coverage gaps in KDAY's eastern coverage area.

== History ==
=== Early years ===
The Daily Report newspaper filed to build a community FM broadcast station in Ontario on September 19, 1944. The station would have broadcast at 49.9 MHz — at the top of the 42–50 MHz FM band of the time — and was granted its construction permit in November 1945. After being relocated to 104.3 MHz, the station went on the air as KOCS-FM on 93.5 FM in 1947, accompanying KOCS (1510 AM). On July 27, 1949, KOCS-FM became KEDO. On October 1, 1958, KOCS became KASK and 93.5 FM became KASK-FM, around the same time of a power increase to 1,000 watts.

The Daily Report sold KASK-AM-FM in 1963 to WCBC-TV, Inc. The new ownership changed the FM call letters to KOYA in July 1965. The Pacific Coast Broadcasting Corporation bought both stations in 1967; KOYA became KSOM-FM to match the call letters of its AM sister. In 1974, AR Communications Corporation acquired KSOM-AM-FM, only to go bankrupt the next year. Media Management Company, Inc., bought the station from receivership in 1976; Jato Communications acquired it in 1978, changing the call letters to KNTF.

=== Hot AC and ethnic programming ===
The KNTF call letters remained in place until 1990, when 93.5 FM became "Thunder Country" for a very short time. In the early 1990s the station became hot adult contemporary (hot AC)-formatted KRZE, "The Breeze". Former staff members of KRZE include Steve Craig (later of 99X Atlanta and at WRXP in New York), Kevin Barrett (who became program director at KTRB "XTRA Sports" in San Francisco), and Lisa Osborne (news anchor at KFI). Both the Torrance and Ontario stations at 93.5 FM, begun in the 1950s on the AM dial, had call signs similar to each other: KFXM in Ontario (serving San Bernardino) and KFXT in Torrance (serving Los Angeles).

Soon after dropping hot AC, the station aired brokered programming purchased primarily by Korean-language broadcasters. In the mid-1990s, it began simulcasting the Redondo Beach station in its various formats, first as KRZE, then KREA, KFSB, KZBA, and KNJR. Its full-length programming in Korean was known as "Radio Korea" until 1999, when KNJR of Ontario and KZBA of Torrance switched to a Spanish-language music format known as "Radio Grupera".

=== Rhythmic/urban formats and KDAY simulcasts ===
On September 20, 2004, the station became a simulcast of KDAY and its hip hop/ R&B format, adopting the KDAI call letters to match its sister station's on-air handle. The signal covered the eastern portions of Los Angeles County and the Inland Empire. Despite the effort to cover the area, it was signal challenged. In 2006, the KDAI calls were changed to KWIE. After three years of simulcasting, Magic announced that KDAY would get a signal upgrade and cover more of the Los Angeles area as an urban contemporary/urban talk outlet. KWIE's simulcast of KDAY ended on August 14, 2008, with the Ontario station re-launching as "FLO 93.5".

The "FLO 93.5" approach was started by Don McCoy, CEO of Magic Broadcasting, which is headquartered in Panama City, Florida. The first 90 days of broadcasting were proposed to be commercial-free. In an interview with The Press-Enterprise, station sales manager Colleen Bambrick described the new format in a telephone interview: "FLO 93.5 will be rhythmic adult contemporary ... We'll play artists like Alicia Keys, Carlos Santana, Usher, maybe a Mary J. Blige."

KWIE's rhythmic AC format did not perform well in the ratings. In September 2009, KWIE dropped the format and returned to simulcasting KDAY's classic hip-hop format under new call letters KDEY-FM. KDAY had dropped its urban contemporary approach, heavy on syndicated programming, in August 2009 after it too had poor ratings.

In May 2014, KDEY-FM and KDAY were sold to Meruelo Group, which also owned Los Angeles television station KWHY-TV (channel 22). On June 7, 2015, the radio stations began carrying Art Laboe's syndicated six-hour Sunday night urban oldies program, The Art Laboe Connection. Previously, the show aired on KHHT until February 2015, when that station dropped its rhythmic oldies format in favor of urban contemporary as KRRL.

On February 28, 2017, KDEY-FM started stunting with a loop of "Welcome to the Jungle" by Guns N' Roses, indicating a tease towards a flip to active rock or classic rock. However, on March 1, KDEY-FM flipped to R&B/hip-hop as "Wild 93.5", giving the Inland Empire its first urban outlet since 1994, when KAEV dropped the format for modern rock as KCXX. It also revived the "Wild" branding that was last used at KRQB from 2004 to 2007 when it was KWIE.

On May 9, 2017, Emmis Broadcasting sold Los Angeles rhythmic top 40 station KPWR to Meruelo for $82.75 million; the new owner began operating KPWR in July. As a result of the acquisition and retaining KPWR's rhythmic format, air staff, and management, Meruelo announced that it would move KDAY and KDEY-FM to KPWR's studios in Burbank effective with the deal. KDEY-FM retained its urban format and continued focusing on the Riverside-San Bernardino market until its return to simulcasting KDAY on October 30, 2017, to avoid direct competition with its newly-acquired sister station as Meruelo management saw KDEY's urban format as redundant, despite having researched targeting the area and to address signal coverage and overlapping issues.
