= KVNA (AM) =

Radio station in Flagstaff, Arizona

- Flagstaff, Arizona; United States
- Broadcast area: Flagstaff–Prescott, Arizona
- Frequency: 600 kHz
- Branding: ESPN 104.7FM AM600

Programming
- Format: Sports
- Affiliations: ESPN Radio

Ownership
- Owner: Yavapai Broadcasting Corporation
- Sister stations: KKLD; KQST; KVNA-FM; KVRD-FM; KYBC

History
- First air date: 1958 (as KEOS)
- Former call signs: KEOS (1958–1981); KZKZ (1981–1986)
- Call sign meaning: "Voice of Northern Arizona" (former slogan)

Technical information
- Licensing authority: FCC
- Facility ID: 68567
- Class: D
- Power: 1,000 watts (day); 70 watts (night)
- Transmitter coordinates: 35°11′26″N 111°40′39.6″W
- Translator: 104.7 K284BO (Flagstaff)

Links
- Public license information: Public file; LMS
- Website: myradioplace.com/kvna/

KVNA (600 AM) is a radio station broadcasting a sports format. Licensed to Flagstaff, Arizona, United States, the station serves the Flagstaff area. The station is owned by Yavapai Broadcasting Corporation.

KVNA is also heard on FM translator K284BO at 104.7 MHz broadcasting from Mt. Elden and serving the greater Flagstaff area, giving the station the "Sunny 104.7" identification.

== History ==
=== KEOS ===
Today's KVNA started as KEOS, which used the slogan "Service in Sound in Northern Arizona" in the 1950s and 1960s. The station was owned by Flagstaff businessman Jack Bird and licensed to Thunderbird Broadcasting Company; the call sign stood for the initials of the first owner, E.O. Smith. KEOS ("Chaos") was a 1,000-watt daytimer signing off at sunset each day on the 1290 AM frequency.

In 1963, the second radio station to operate in Flagstaff failed. KGPH signed on December 6, 1950, from studios in the Weatherford Hotel. The station would relocate from 1230 kHz to 690 in 1953. KGPH was bought by a part-owner of Phoenix's KOY in April 1956; the new owners changed the callsign to KVNA. In June 1963, KVNA was sold to Frontier Television for $95,000. KVNA was described as defunct by that September, with its license deleted on January 4, 1965; in October 1963, KEOS filed to take over the superior 24-hour facilities that belonged to KVNA. The application was approved in 1966, but it was not until the station completed construction of its new studio facilities, on September 8, 1969, that it moved to 690. The new KEOS broadcast with 1,000 watts day and 500 watts night, DA-2. The station later changed its call sign to KZKZ after it was sold in 1981.

=== KVNA ===
After Communications Ltd. (Ed Raabe and Paul Seyler) purchased the station in 1986, they changed the call sign from KZKZ to KVNA (returning the call sign to the frequency for the first time since 1963), and paired it with a new FM station at 97.5 MHz (KVNA-FM).

On July 14, 1988, the station that had been recognized as Northern Arizona's news and sports station, KCLS at 600 kHz, shut down when its owner opted to convert the land into a mobile home park. KVNA moved to acquire on-air talent, including the former KCLS general manager, and sports rights including Los Angeles Dodgers baseball and Flagstaff High School football. In the mid-1990s, under new ownership, KVNA would acquire the dormant KCLS license in order to relocate KVNA to 600 kHz.

On December 30, 2014, the "Sunny" AC format of KVNA-FM moved to KVNA and its FM translator as "Sunny 104.7". KVNA flipped to sports talk in 2019.

== Station ownership ==
- 1952–1974 THUNDERBIRD BROADCASTING COMPANY

owned no other radio stations

- 1974–1978 CFK CORPORATION (Jason Jennings, Paul Knutsen, Connie Knutsen)

owned no other radio stations

- 1978–1986 in receivership to Jack Bird, former Principal of Thunderbird Broadcasting, with Todd Wallace, broadcast consultant
- 1986–1989 COMMUNICATIONS, LTD, (Ed Raabe & Paul Seyler)
- 1994–1996 PARK LANE COMMUNICATIONS

owned stations in Kansas along with 97.5 KVNA-FM and was to sign on current KMGN

- 1996–1999 REGENT BROADCASTING

owned sister stations KZGL-FM, KVNA-FM along with stations in Ohio, Indiana, Illinois, California, New Mexico and Minnesota

- 1999– YAVAPAI BROADCASTING

currently owns KQST-FM, KVNA-FM, KVRD-FM, KKLD-FM, KYBC-AM

== On-air personalities/shows ==
Some notable radio personalities have worked at either KVNA or KCLS earlier in their careers. Tim Hattrick of the well known Phoenix morning team of Tim and Willie (who have worked at KMLE and KNIX) started at KZKZ while in college at Northern Arizona University. Jim Sharpe, who has worked mornings in several major markets, including Los Angeles spent some of his early radio career at KCLS in the early 1980s. Some other notable personalities and shows to appear on either station were:

- The Radio Factor with Bill O'Reilly
- The Clark Howard Show
- Ed Schultz
- Jim Bohannon
- When Radio Was
- Coast to Coast AM
- CBS Weekend Roundup
- KVNA Saturday Folk with Barry Harrison
- KVNA Collectors Connection
- The Kim Komando Show
- ESPN Radio The Huddle
- Animal Radio
- Steve Dale's Pet World
- The Wall Street Journal This Morning / This Weekend
- KVNA Radio Fiesta with Arlette Vague (Spanish)
- Marshall Trimble's Arizona Tales
- Newsweek on Air
- On the House with the Carey Brothers
- The Other Side With Steve Godfrey

=== Sports ===
- ESPN Radio programming
- Phoenix Suns Basketball
- Arizona Diamondbacks Baseball
- Arizona Cardinals Football
- Phoenix Coyotes Hockey
- Flagstaff area high school football
