= Transamerica =

Transamerica or Transamerican may refer to:

== Arts and entertainment ==
- TransAmerica (board game), a railroad board game
- Transamerica (film), a 2005 comedy drama
  - Transamerica (soundtrack)

== Businesses ==
- Transamerica Corporation, an American financial holding company
- Transamérica Media Company, a Brazilian radio network
  - Transamérica Pop, a Brazilian radio station

== Sport ==
- The Transamerica or Transamerica Senior Golf Championship, a golf tournament in Napa, California 1989–2002

== See also ==
- Trans Am (disambiguation)
- Across America (disambiguation)
- Coast to Coast (disambiguation)
- TransAmerica Athletic Conference, now Atlantic Sun Conference
- TransAmerica Bicycle Trail, between Astoria, Oregon, and Yorktown, Virginia, United States
  - U.S. Bicycle Route 76, the TransAmerica Bike Route, contained within the TransAmerica Bicycle Trail
- Transamerica Plaque, a discontinued annual award in the Quebec Major Junior Hockey League
- Transamerica Pyramid, a skyscraper in San Francisco, US
- Transamerica Tower (Baltimore), US
