= KVNA =

KVNA may refer to:

- KVNA (AM), a radio station (600 AM) licensed to Flagstaff, Arizona, United States
- KVNA-FM, a radio station (100.1 FM) licensed to Flagstaff, Arizona, United States
- Katholieke Verkenners Nederlandse Antillen KVNA, the Catholic Scouts of the Netherlands Antilles
