= KYBC =

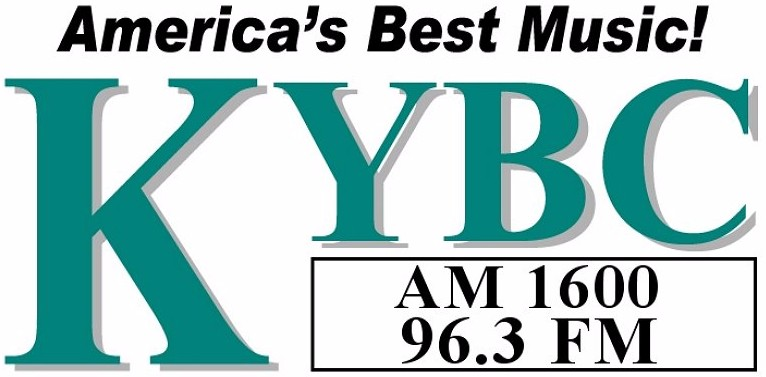
- Cottonwood, Arizona; United States
- Broadcast area: Verde Valley
- Frequency: 1600 kHz
- Branding: KYBC AM 1600 96.3 FM

Programming
- Format: Soft oldies – Adult standards
- Affiliations: Westwood One; ABC News Radio

Ownership
- Owner: Yavapai Broadcasting Corporation
- Sister stations: KKLD, KQST, KVNA (AM), KVNA-FM, KVRD-FM

History
- First air date: December 20, 1964; 61 years ago (as KVIO)
- Former call signs: KVIO (1964–1979); KVRD (1979–1996)

Technical information
- Licensing authority: FCC
- Facility ID: 35866
- Class: D
- Power: 1000 watts (day); 46 watts (night)
- Transmitter coordinates: 34°43′15.1″N 111°59′57.6″W
- Translator: 96.3 K242BZ (Cottonwood)

Links
- Public license information: Public file; LMS
- Website: 1600kybc.com

KYBC (1600 kHz) is a commercial AM radio station licensed to Cottonwood, Arizona, and serving the Verde Valley. It is owned by the Yavapai Broadcasting Corporation, headed by W. Grant Hafley. KYBC has a soft oldies – adult standards radio format. Programming is provided by Westwood One's "America's Best Music" network, with national news updates provided by ABC News Radio.

KYBC is powered at 1,000 watts by day. To avoid interference to other stations on 1600 AM, at night it reduces power to 46 watts. The transmitter is off Route 89A in Cottonwood. It is also heard on 93 watt FM translator K242BZ at 96.3 MHz.

== History ==
On December 20, 1964, the station first signed on the air as KVIO. It was originally a daytimer, required to go off the air at night.

In 1966, it was acquired by K-M Broadcasting. The station was assigned the KYBC call letters by the Federal Communications Commission on May 24, 1996.
