= KKLD =

Coordinates: 34.687°N 112.118°W

- Cottonwood, Arizona; United States
- Broadcast area: Flagstaff-Prescott, Arizona
- Frequency: 95.9 MHz
- Branding: The Cloud

Programming
- Format: Classic hits
- Affiliations: Westwood One

Ownership
- Owner: Yavapai Broadcasting Corporation
- Sister stations: KQST, KVNA, KVNA-FM, KVRD-FM, KYBC

History
- First air date: August 1983 (as KSMK-FM)
- Former call signs: KCRJ-FM (1980–1983, CP); KSMK-FM (1983–1991); KZGL (1991–2006)
- Call sign meaning: K K CLouD

Technical information
- Licensing authority: FCC
- Facility ID: 51642
- Class: C0
- ERP: 21,000 watts
- HAAT: 799 meters (2,621 ft)
- Translator: 92.1 K221GL (Prescott)

Links
- Public license information: Public file; LMS
- Webcast: Listen Live
- Website: KKLD Online

KKLD (95.9 FM, "The Cloud") is a commercial radio station located in Cottonwood, Arizona, broadcasting to the Flagstaff-Prescott, Arizona area. KKLD airs a classic hits music format syndicated by ABC Radio Network.

In addition to its usual music programming, through the months of September to December, the station broadcasts the high school football games of the Bradshaw Bears of Bradshaw Mountain High School in Prescott Valley, Arizona. The games are commentated by Matt Showalter.

== History ==
Signing on in August 1983 under the call sign KSMK-FM, the station started life with a Top 40/CHR format under the KISS-FM brand. The station dropped Top 40 in 1991 for adult contemporary under the call letters KZGL.

In 1996, the station dropped AC for classic rock retaining its call letters. Two years later in 1998, the station flipped its format to a modern rock music format branded as "The Z" with its slogan "The Total Rock Experience" (primary) or "We Just Suck a Little Less" (secondary). In 2006, the former KKLD call letters and "The Cloud" branding, moved its frequency from 98.3 FM to 95.9 FM and changed its format to a classic hits format.
