= Rádio Disney Brasil =

Rádio Disney 91.3 (ZYD849)
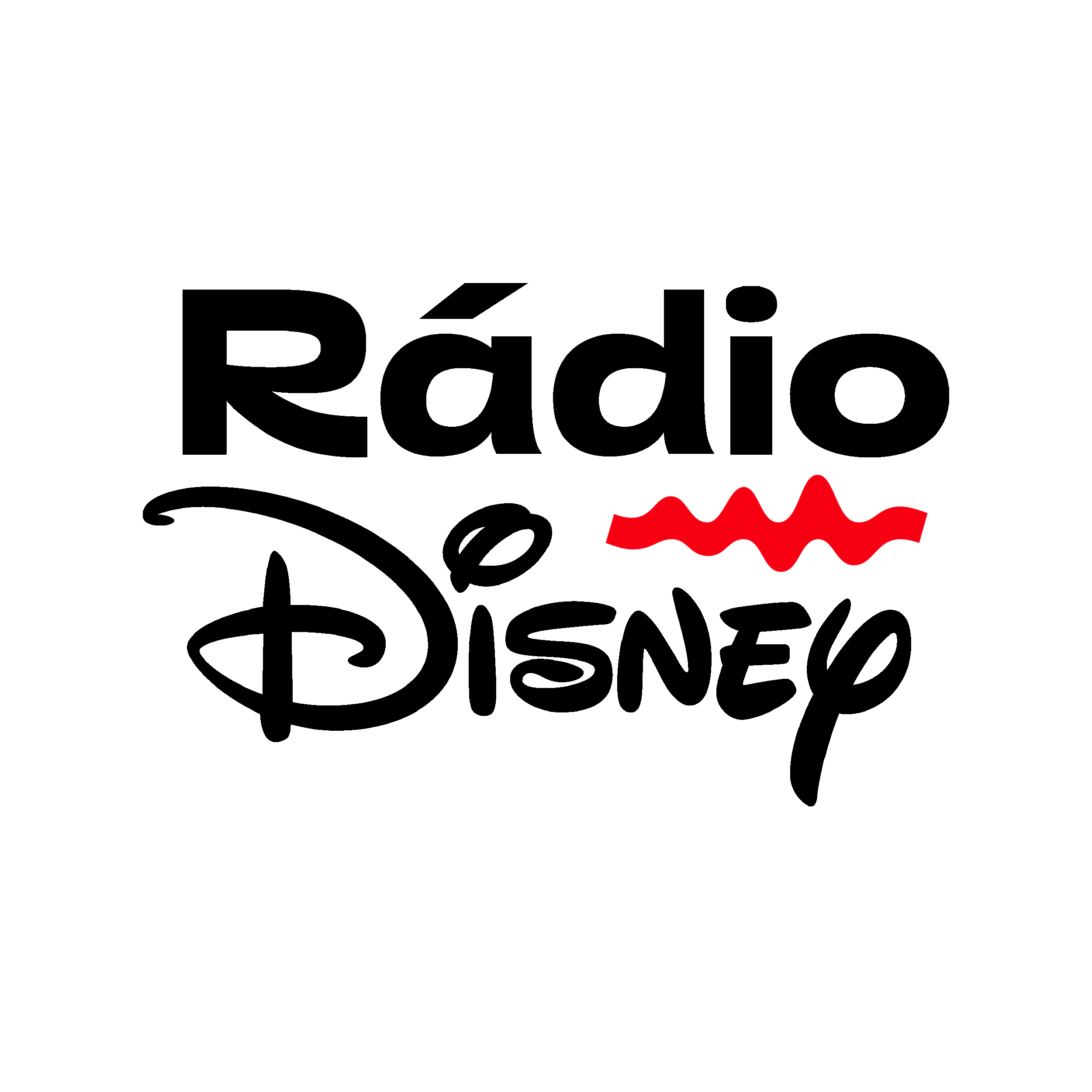
- São Paulo, Sāo Paulo; Brazil

Ownership
- Owner: Rádio Holding (71%) The Walt Disney Company Latin America (29%); (Rádio Itapema FM de São Paulo Ltda)
- Sister stations: 89 FM A Rádio Rock; Alpha FM; Rede Transamérica

Technical information
- Licensing authority: ANATEL
- Class: E3
- ERP: 60 kW
- Transmitter coordinates: 23°33′25″S 46°39′40″W

Links
- Public license information: Profile
- Website: radiodisney.disney.com.br/Radio

Radio Disney Brasil is a radio network that is mostly owned by Rádio Holding, but The Walt Disney Company also has a 30% share. São Paulo is the only city in Brazil that has this format being carried on a radio station. The station broadcasts on 91.3 MHz and online. All programming is produced and broadcast live from World Trade Center de São Paulo (in short WTCSP), whilst the transmitter is located at the top of São Luís Gonzaga building in Espigão da Paulista.

The music programming is aimed primarily at youth and adolescents, similar to the American version, and it's the ninth one of its kind in Latin America. It is currently São Paulo's fifth most popular youth-oriented radio station (behind Jovem Pan FM, 89 FM a Rádio Rock, Metropolitana FM and Kiss FM, but ahead of Mix FM, Transamérica, Energia 97 and Dumont FM).

== History ==
=== Change in 91.3 FM frequency ===
In the second quarter of 2009, FM Nossa Radio stopped transmitting on 91.3 to move to 106.9 MHz. With that change, rumours began about the future of this frequency in São Paulo. Shortly before the end of the year, the station began carrying adult-oriented music and there was news that there was a possibility that the Disney Group would acquire a station in the city. The conglomerate has a minority stake in the radio in partnership with the Brazilian company Radio Holding LTDA. With this acquisition, this became the largest investment of a foreign group in Brazil at the time.

=== Project starters ===
In the first half of 2010, after obtaining the concession by the Disney Group, the 91.3 frequency (with no official name until this time yet) started playing (mysteriously) uninterrupted youth-based (mostly pop) music, playing songs by artists like Demi Lovato, Jonas Blue, Miley Cyrus, among various others. The project was based on a broader sense of a format aimed at young audiences, bringing more interactivity through listener participation through social networks, SMS and telephone. In 2012, the station announced a relaunch of its broadcast studios to offer a better sound quality in frequency 91.3.

=== Promotion for the new station ===
In October 2010, a new campaign began, "91.3 Que radio es esa?" ("91.3 What radio [station] is that?"), causing much excitement for São Paulo radio listeners, whether they had listened to the station prior to this point or not. Monica Leon, Telma Emerick, Roberto Hais, Serginho Bralle, and Marcelo Bressane were confirmed as the station's announcers/DJs. In this phase the future Radio Disney begins to disclose telephone for contact, provisional site and realizes a promotion in which takes listeners for the show of the Jonas Brothers in Brazil, where also the arrival of the transmitter is announced. In August 2011, the station's audience began being monitored by Crowley Broadcast Analysis.

=== Official launch ===
On November 7, 2010, the name and date of the launch of the new radio station - Radio Disney and November 29 respectively, is officially released, marking the end of the mystery that almost lasted one year. The launch took place at 7am that day, with the first announcer on air being Telma Emerick. On this day, several Brazilian artists went on air wishing luck for the station.

== Programmes/Segments ==
- Despertador Rádio Disney: A listener wakes up a person of their choice (very usually relatives or friends) with a shout-out message and a song. Both of these has to be sent to the station at least the day before the desired time (messages will only air on weekdays, 6am-10am). Presented by Priscila Santos.
- Expresso Rádio Disney: 30 minutes of nonstop music.
- Manhã Rádio Disney: Entertainment and interaction program with the public that airs from Monday to Friday mornings. Presented by Diego Barone.
- Tarde Rádio Disney: Entertainment and interaction program with the public that airs from Monday to Friday afternoons. Presented by Marcelo Bressane.
- Canta Aí: Listeners request songs by performing them and submit the audio recordings through either the station's telephone or WhatsApp number. It is currently presented by Marcelo Bressane.
- Ranking Rádio Disney: The station's official chart that counting down the week's 20 biggest and most requested songs.
- Trio Rádio Disney: Interactive program in which a 3-song sequence from a listener is played.
- Clássicos Rádio Disney: Classic hits and throwbacks (may also include songs that the station has not played in a while).
- Boletim SportsCenter: Short sports news bulletins aired throughout the day.
- Lá Vem Ela: Short celebrities news bulletins presented by journalist Keila Jimenez.

== See also ==
- Disney Channel Brazil
- Radio Disney
