= William Meeks =

William Meeks may refer to:

- William B. Meeks Jr., American producer, composer and arranger of radio jingles
- William Hamilton Meeks, III, American mathematician
