= Jonathan M. Wolfert =

- Born: May 10, 1952 (age 74)
- Genre: Jingles
- Occupation: Producer/Composer

Jon Wolfert (born May 10, 1952 as Jonathan Wolfert) is President of JAM Creative Productions Inc. and their predecessor, PAMS, both of which are Dallas, Texas-based jingle companies supplying jingles and production music to radio and TV stations worldwide.

== Career ==
Jonathan Wolfert's love of radio jingles began in the 1960s listening to the radio, whilst growing up in New York City. As he began to learn about broadcasting, he discovered that the pieces of music used to announce the name of the station were called "jingles" and were made by a small number of very specialized companies, most of which were in Dallas.

In 1971 Jon moved to Dallas to work for PAMS, one of the top jingle production houses of the day. About 3 years later he and his wife decided to create their own company. JAM officially began in November 1974. The name came from the initials for "Jon And Mary Lyn".

The company went on to make jingles for radio stations around the world. Some of the most famous are for WABC (AM), KOST, WLS on AM and FM, Z-100, BBC Radio 1 and 2.

Jon Wolfert presents a weekly radio show on 'Rewound Radio', an internet Radio station broadcasting from New York, providing oldies (over 3000 of them) and the custom made PAMS/JAM jingles.
