= KCLS =

KCLS may refer to:

- KCLS (FM), a radio station (101.5 FM) in Leeds, Utah, United States
- KCLS (Arizona), a defunct radio station in Flagstaff, Arizona, United States
- Kenosha County Library System, library system serving Kenosha County, Wisconsin, United States
- King County Library System, a library system in King County, Washington, United States
- Chehalis-Centralia Airport's ICAO code for the airport in Washington state
