= List of countries bordering on two or more oceans =

Overview of trans-oceanic countries

World map of countries by number of oceans bordered: landlocked countries; countries bordering one ocean; countries bordering two oceans; countries bordering three oceans; countries bordering several oceans via their dependent territories.

World map of the five-ocean model with approximate boundaries

Some non-landlocked countries touch more than one of the five named oceans: the Arctic, Atlantic, Indian, Pacific, and Southern. Countries bordering only one ocean are not listed here, no matter how many of its marginal seas they touch. The main list includes only contiguous areas touching multiple oceans; a second list includes countries whose total number of oceans is increased due to discontiguous areas.

== Contiguous area ==
This list includes only contiguous parts of a country with coastlines on multiple oceans. Countries touching multiple oceans due to discontiguous reasions are listed below in § Discontiguous countries. Under each ocean is listed the smallest named region or marginal sea that includes the coastline where that country and ocean meet.

Continent(s)	Country	Pacific Ocean	Atlantic Ocean	Indian Ocean	Polar oceans	Count	Trans-oceanic connection
Africa	South Africa		South Atlantic	Indian Ocean	Southern Ocean	2 or 3 (Note: South Africa borders on three oceans if the Southern Ocean is considered to extend to its shores, but only on two otherwise.)	Cape of Good Hope
Africa; Asia	Egypt		Mediterranean Sea	Red Sea		2	Suez Canal
Asia	Israel		Mediterranean Sea	Red Sea		2	High-speed railway to Eilat (proposed)
Asia	Thailand	Gulf of Thailand		Andaman Sea		2	Thai Canal (proposed)
Asia	Malaysia	South China Sea		Andaman Sea		2	Strait of Malacca
Asia	East Timor	Savu Sea; Flores Sea		Timor Sea		2	
Asia; Oceania	Indonesia	Pacific Ocean		Indian Ocean		2	
Asia; Europe	Russia	North Pacific	Black Sea; Baltic Sea		Arctic Ocean	3	Trans-Siberian Railway
Europe	Norway		Norwegian Sea		Barents Sea	2	
Europe	Iceland		North Atlantic		Greenland Sea	1 or 2 (Note: Iceland bordrers on two oceans if the Greenland Sea is considered a part of the Arctic Ocean, but only one if it is considered a part of the North Atlantic.)	
North America	Greenland (Note: Greenland is a part of the Kingdom of Denmark.)		North Atlantic		Arctic Ocean	2	
North America	Canada	North Pacific	North Atlantic		Arctic Ocean	3	Canadian Pacific Railway
North America	US (Alaska)	North Pacific			Arctic Ocean	2 (Note: Although Alaska and the Lower 48 each borders on two oceans, no single contiguous U.S. territory borders on three oceans. The two together would make the United States a country bordering on three oceans.)	Trans-Alaska Pipeline
North America	US (Lower 48)	North Pacific	North Atlantic			2	First transcontinental railroad
North America	Mexico	Pacific Ocean	Gulf of Mexico; Caribbean Sea			2	Tehuantepec route
North America	Guatemala	Pacific Ocean	Gulf of Honduras			2	
North America	Honduras	Gulf of Fonseca	Caribbean Sea			2	
North America	Nicaragua	Pacific Ocean	Caribbean Sea			2	Nicaragua Canal (proposed)
North America	Costa Rica	Pacific Ocean	Caribbean Sea			2	
North America; South America (Note: The boundary between North America and South America is somewhat arbitrary. Although atlases in the Western countries today generally show Panama entirely within North America, some atlases show the continental boundary along the Panama Canal instead. Furthermore, some 19th century atlases even showed the continental boundary along the border between Costa Rica and Panama, which was then a part of Gran Colombia.)	Panama	Gulf of Panama	Caribbean Sea			2	Panama Canal
South America	Colombia	Pacific Ocean	Caribbean Sea			2	
South America	Chile	South Pacific	Strait of Magellan; Beagle Channel; Drake Passage		Southern Ocean	2 or 3 (Note: Chile borders on three oceans if the Southern and Atlantic Oceans are considered to meet in its territory, but only on two otherwise.)	
South America	Argentina	Beagle Channel	South Atlantic		Drake Passage	1, 2 or 3 (Note: Argentina's oceans include the Southern Ocean if the Drake Passage is considered part of it and the Pacific Ocean if its waters are considered to extend to the Argentine portion of the Beagle Channel.)	
Oceania	Australia	South Pacific		Indian Ocean	Southern Ocean	2 or 3 (Note: Australia borders on three oceans if the Southern Ocean is considered to extend that far north, but only on two otherwise.)	Indian Pacific
Continent(s)	Country	Pacific Ocean	Atlantic Ocean	Indian Ocean	Polar oceans	Count	Trans-oceanic connection

== Discontiguous countries ==
This section lists countries whose overall count of oceans is increased by considering discontiguous areas.

Only the largest contiguous area is listed under a given ocean, and then only if it contributes to the total number of oceans, so Great Britain and Metropolitan France are listed but not Bermuda or French Guiana, and Alaska and the Lower 48 are listed separately, but not Hawaii.

Country	Counts		Pacific Ocean	Atlantic Ocean	Indian Ocean	Southern Ocean	Arctic Ocean
France	4	1	New Caledonia	Metropolitan France	Réunion	Adélie Land	
UK	4	1	Pitcairn Islands	Great Britain	BIOT	British Antarctic Territory	
US	3	2	Lower 48	Lower 48			
US	3	2	Alaska				Alaska

== See also ==
- Bioceanic principle
- Borders of the oceans
- Boundaries between the continents
- Sea to Sea (disambiguation)
- Transcontinental railroad
- World Ocean
