= JAM Creative Productions =

American radio, television, and commercial jingle company

JAM Creative Productions, Inc.
- Type: Producer of jingles and other music for radio and television
- Founded: 1974; 51 years ago
- Headquarters: Dallas, Texas, United States
- Key people: Jonathan Wolfert and Mary Lyn Wolfert, founders
- Website: www.jingles.com

JAM Creative Productions, Inc., is an American company that produces radio jingles, promo music for television, and commercial jingles for advertisers. It has made more radio jingles than any other jingle company and has become part of American pop culture.

== History ==
The company was founded in November 1974 by husband and wife Jonathan M. and Mary Lyn Wolfert. Prior to the formation of JAM, Jon worked for PAMS which he now owns and was a fan of their work. Jon also worked briefly at TM Productions (now TM Studios) and did freelance work for several other studios.

JAM is the only production house of its type which has been continuously owned and operated by its founders for over 50 years. It produces jingles for clients ranging from local DJs to the most influential radio stations in the world.

WPEN and WMGK Philadelphia were among the company's earliest major-market clients. Within a few years, JAM jingles were used by many of the most listened-to radio stations of all time including WABC, WFAN, WPLJ, and WHTZ in New York (better known by its Z100 branding), WLS AM and WLS-FM in Chicago, KIIS AM & FM in Los Angeles, Jovem Pan, Jovem Pan FM, Transamérica FM, Metropolitana FM, Rádio Globo and Manchete FM in Brazil and BBC Radio 1 and Radio 2 in London, UK, even as far as making jingles for offshore stations like Radio Nova & LASER558. JAM also created themes and jingles for many syndicated radio programs, including those hosted by Casey Kasem, Dick Clark, Rick Dees, Dick Bartley, Bob Costas, Scott Shannon, Dan Ingram (the latter of which JAM would later produce The Weekend Music Review with Dan Ingram with Jon Wolfert serving as executive producer) and others. In addition, JAM has worked for various TV clients including ABC, NBC (David Letterman), VH-1, GMA Network (Philippines), and more.

=== Popularity ===
In the UK, almost all jingles heard on BBC Radio 1 and 2 between the mid-1970s and mid-1990s were made by JAM.

In the United States, JAM has produced more custom jingles for KOST in Los Angeles than any other station, although WLS in Chicago is very close. JAM's top-selling package has been "Warp Factor," created for Z100 in 1985. Since 2001, both XM Satellite Radio and Sirius Satellite Radio (now Sirius-XM) make extensive use of JAM jingles on their music channels. Z100 accounts for five of the top ten packages sold by JAM, with KIIS-FM, WKQI/Detroit, WPLJ, and WABC rounding out the list.

In Brazil, JAM produced jingles for many stations, such as Jovem Pan, Transamérica FM, Metropolitana FM, Manchete FM and Atlântida. The majority of these stations used "resings" from packages like: Double Plus, Meltdown, Music Jam and One FM.

In Indonesia, JAM has produced jingles for many stations in Jakarta, Bandung and Surabaya among others.

In the Philippines, JAM has produced jingles for many stations in Manila (specifically 89 DMZ, Campus Radio WLS-FM, Zoo FM 101.9, 102.7 Star FM) and FM Radio 92.3, Cebu, Davao and Zamboanga among others. Other stations in the Philippines produced from JAM like Radyo Natin Nationwide, Love Radio and others.

JAM jingles have also been used in movies and TV shows to add authenticity to the era or location of a scene, including the jingle for the fictional mini FM station "KIWI" that appears in the 1991 film Embrace Me as Many Times as the Waves.

The JAM building, which houses two recording studios, offices, and a large media archive, is located in Dallas, just east of the downtown area.
