= KQST =

Contemporary hit radio station in Sedona, Arizona

Coordinates: 34.968°N 111.509°W

- Sedona, Arizona; United States
- Broadcast area: Flagstaff–Prescott, Arizona
- Frequency: 102.9 MHz
- Branding: Q102.9

Programming
- Format: Top 40

Ownership
- Owner: Yavapai Broadcasting Corporation
- Sister stations: KKLD, KVNA (AM), KVNA-FM, KVRD-FM, KYBC

History
- First air date: May 1, 1984

Technical information
- Licensing authority: FCC
- Facility ID: 57293
- Class: C
- ERP: 100,000 watts
- HAAT: 451.0 meters (1,479.7 ft)

Links
- Public license information: Public file; LMS
- Webcast: Listen Live
- Website: KQST Online

KQST (102.9 FM, "Q102.9") is a radio station broadcasting a Top 40 format. Licensed to Sedona, Arizona, United States, the station serves the Flagstaff, Arizona, area. The station is currently owned by Yavapai Broadcasting Corporation.

== History ==
KQST signed on the air on May 1, 1984, airing an Easy Listening format including special programs from Jazz and Big Band formats. In 1992, the format was changed to a Hot AC format, but the special programs that were formerly used from its easy listening format still runs during its early Hot AC days for a shorter period of time. The station went a full Top 40 format in 1999, under the direction of Programmer Guy Giuliano.

== Yavapai Broadcasting ==
In August 2004, W. Grant Hafley, owner of Yavapai Broadcasting, reached an agreement to acquire KQST for a reported $3 million.

== Station Ownership ==
- 1984–1988 ARIZONA MEDIACOMM

also owned sister KAZM-AM

- 1988–2004 ROCKET RADIO CORPORATION

also owned sister stations KAZM-AM and KLOD-FM (now KVNA-FM)

- 2004–Current YAVAPAI BROADCASTING

currently owns KVNA-AM, KVNA-FM, KVRD-FM, KKLD-FM, KYBC-AM
