= Coast to Coast =

Coast to Coast or Coast 2 Coast may refer to:

== Films and television ==
- Coast to Coast (1980 film), a comedy film starring Dyan Cannon and Robert Blake
- Coast to Coast (1987 film), a comedy thriller film starring Lenny Henry and John Shea
- Coast to Coast (2003 film), a television film starring Richard Dreyfuss and Judy Davis
- Coast to Coast (British TV programme), the regional news programme of TVS, 1982–1992
- Coast to Coast (1998 TV series), a UK documentary series featuring Janet Street-Porter
- Coast to Coast, a television show starring Australian comedian Graham Kennedy
- Space Ghost Coast to Coast, an animated TV series that aired on Cartoon Network's Adult Swim
- Cavuto Coast to Coast (TV series), business news program hosted by Neil Cavuto

== Music ==
- Coast to Coast (band), British rockabilly band
- Coast 2 Coast (B-Legit album), 2007
- Coast To Coast (Dave Clark Five album)
- Coast to Coast (Hit the Lights EP),
- Coast to Coast (McDonald's Jazz Band album), 1984
- Coast to Coast (Steve Morse Band album), 1992
- Coast to Coast (Cody Simpson EP)
- Coast to Coast (Westlife album)
- Coast to Coast: Overture and Beginners, a 1973 album by Faces
- "Coast 2 Coast", a song by Sam Adams from Boston's Boy
- "Coast to Coast", a song by Ducks Deluxe, 1973 (their first single)
- "Coast to Coast", a song by The Jesus and Mary Chain from Automatic
- "Coast to Coast", a song by The Scorpions from Lovedrive
- "Coast to Coast", a song by Elliott Smith from From a Basement on the Hill

== Radio ==
- Coast to Coast AM, a syndicated AM talk radio show made famous by Art Bell
- Costas Coast to Coast, now known as Costas on the Radio
- Country Coast to Coast, a radio format, the former name of Best Country Today

== Routes ==
- Coast-to-Coast Trail, a multi-use trail from the west to east coast of Florida.
- Coast to Coast Walk, a route devised by Alfred Wainwright to cross northern England
- Coast to Coast Cycle Route or Sea to Sea Cycle Route (C2C), crosses the Lake District and the Pennines in the north of England

== Other uses ==
- Coast to Coast (race), a multisport event held annually in New Zealand
- Coast to Coast (restaurant), an American themed restaurant in England owned by Restaurant Group
- Coast to Coast Athletic Conference, an American college athletic conference in NCAA Division III
- Coast-to-coast goal, in Australian rules football
- Coast to Coast Hardware, a defunct chain of American hardware stores, now part of True Value
- Coast to Coast, a US telecom company, renamed Allegiance Telecom, then acquired by XO Communications
- OutRun 2006: Coast 2 Coast, a racing video game
- Coast to Coast Expansion Pack, for the video game Railroad Tycoon 3

== See also ==
- Sea to Sea (disambiguation)
- Across America (disambiguation)
- Transamerica (disambiguation)
- Land's End to John o' Groats
- Contiguous United States
