= Sea to Sea =

Sea to Sea or From Sea to Sea may refer to:

- English translation of "A mari usque ad mare", Canadian national motto
- English translation of the Polish nationalistic slogan "Od morza do morza"
- From Sea to Sea and Other Sketches, Letters of Travel, by Rudyard Kipling
- Sea to Sea Cycle Route, a cycle route crossing Northern England
- Sea-to-Sea Route, a proposed hiking trail in the northern United States
- Sea to Sea Hiking Trail, a long distance hiking trail crossing Northern Israel
- A series of Canadian praise and worship compilation albums:
  - Sea to Sea: Filled with Your Glory, 2004
  - Sea to Sea: I See the Cross, 2005
  - Sea to Sea: For Endless Days, 2006

== See also ==
- C2C (disambiguation)
- Coast to Coast (disambiguation)
- From C to C: Chinese Canadian Stories of Migration, a 2011 documentary film about Chinese Canadians
- From sea to shining sea, a lyric from American patriotic song "America the Beautiful"
