= Trans Am =

Trans Am may refer to:

== Transportation ==
- Pontiac Firebird Trans Am, an automobile model
- Trans-Am Series, an American automobile racing series
- Trans Am Bike Race, an annual cycling race across the United States

== Arts and entertainment ==
- Trans Am (band), an American post-rock band
  - Trans Am (album), their 1996 debut album, and the title song
- "Trans Am" (Thompson Square song), 2015
- "Trans Am", a song by Neil Young from the 1994 album Sleeps with Angels
- Trans Am (EP), by The Network, 2020

== See also ==
- Transamerica (disambiguation)
- Across America (disambiguation)
- Tranz Am, a 1983 video game
