= Joseph Whidbey State Park =

State park in the U.S. state of Washington

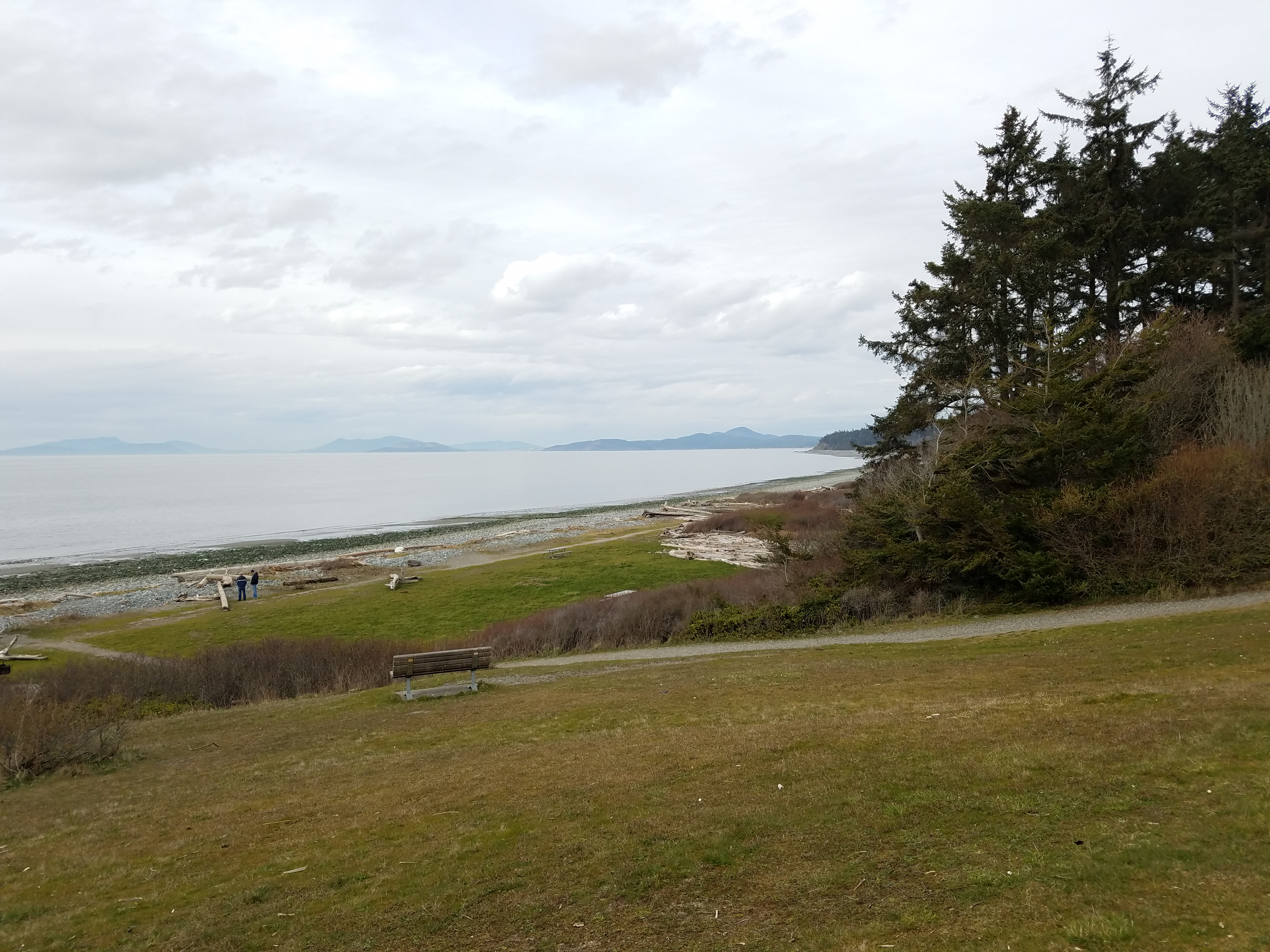
- View of the beach

- Location within Washington (state) Location within the United States
- Location: Island County, Washington, United States
- Coordinates: 48°18′32″N 122°42′47″W
- Area: 112 acres (45 ha)
- Elevation: 58 ft (18 m)
- Established: 1974
- Administrator: Washington State Parks and Recreation Commission
- Website: Official website

Joseph Whidbey State Park is a 112-acre (45 ha) Washington state park in Island County, Washington with 3,100 feet (940 m) of shoreline on the Strait of Juan de Fuca in north Puget Sound. Park activities include picnicking, ADA-accessible hiking, canoeing, crabbing, beachcombing, and birdwatching. A small section of the Pacific Northwest National Scenic Trail crosses through the park.
