= Bay View State Park =

Protected-area

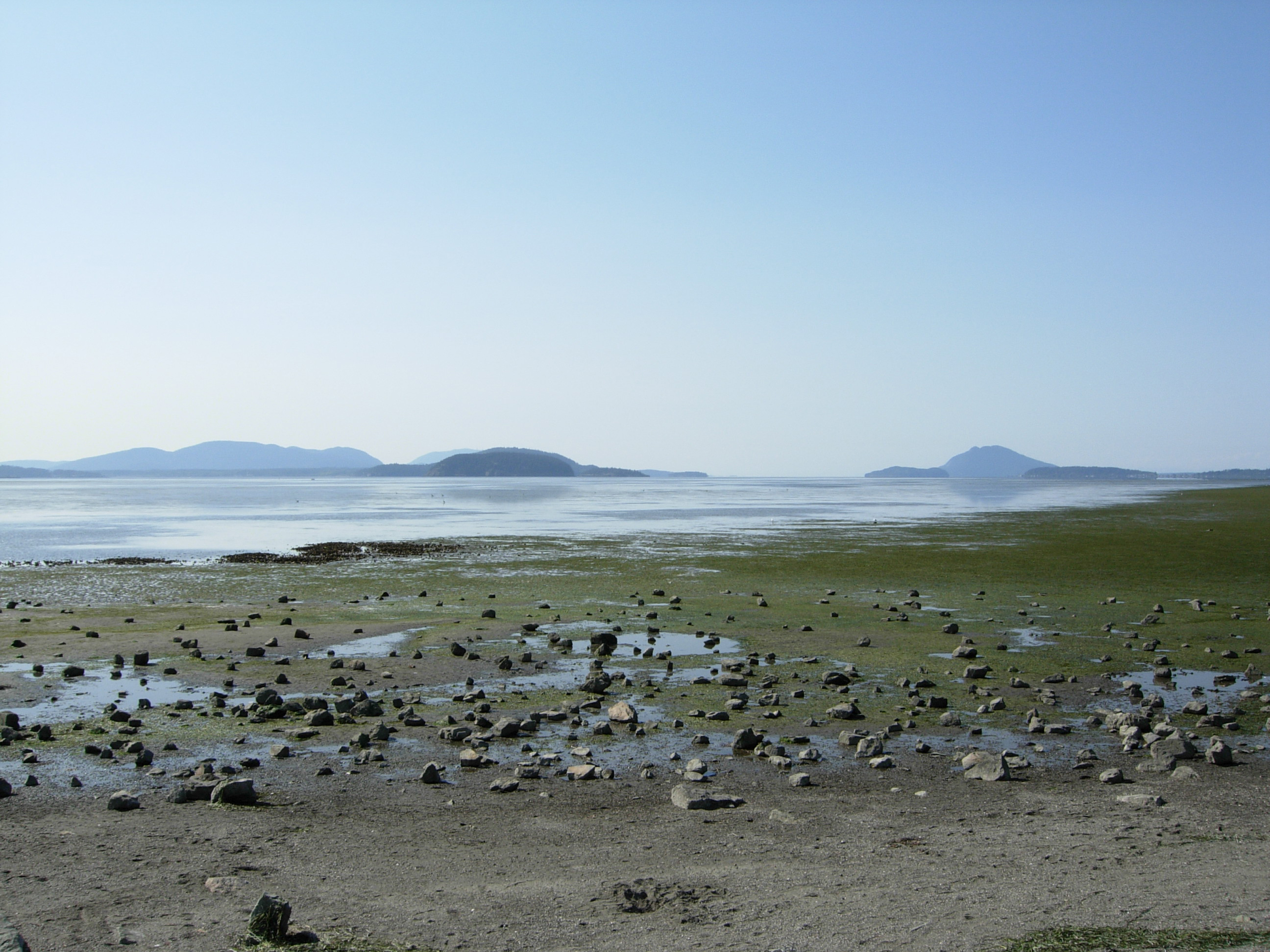
- Padilla Bay seen from the park

- Location within Washington (state) Location within the United States
- Interactive map of Bay View State Park
- Location: Skagit County, Washington, United States
- Nearest city: Burlington, Washington
- Coordinates: 48°29′19″N 122°28′43″W
- Area: 66 acres (27 ha)
- Elevation: 49 ft (15 m)
- Established: 1925
- Administrator: Washington State Parks and Recreation Commission
- Visitors: 231,985 (in 2024)
- Website: Official website

Bay View State Park is a public recreation area located on Padilla Bay in Skagit County, Washington, United States. The state park's 66 acres (27 ha) include 1,285 feet (392 m) of shoreline and facilities for camping, picnicking, swimming and beachcombing. It originated in 1925 when the Skagit County Agricultural Association donated land to the state to be used for park purposes. The park is crossed by a stretch of the Pacific Northwest Trail.
