= Metaline Falls Bridge =

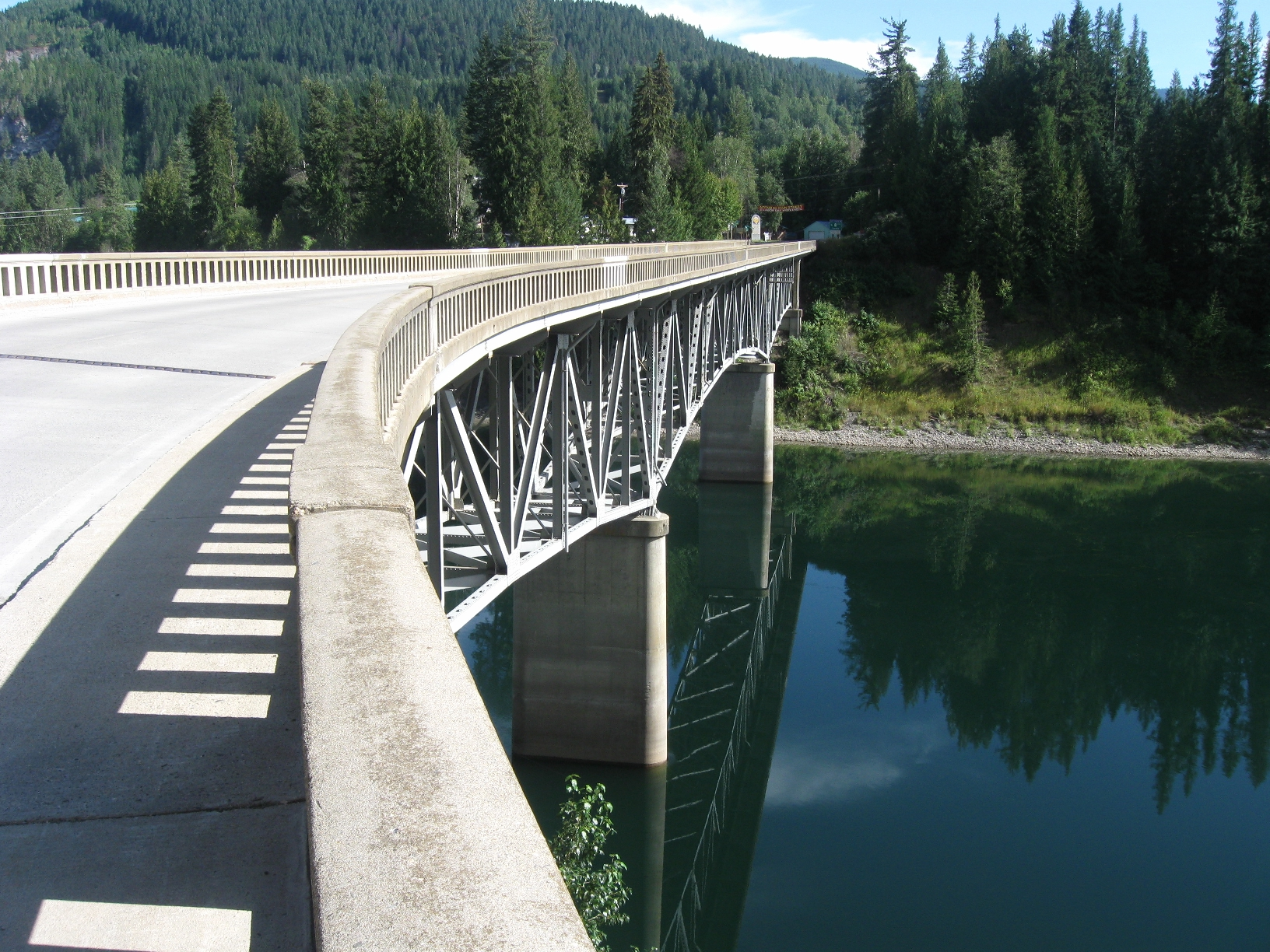
- Metaline Falls Bridge
- Coordinates: 48°51′54.4″N 117°22′23.4″W
- Carries: SR 31
- Crosses: Pend Oreille River
- Locale: Metaline Falls, Washington
- Maintained by: Washington State Department of Transportation

Characteristics
- Design: Warren deck truss
- Total length: 696 feet (212 m)
- Width: 26 feet (8 m)
- Longest span: 240 feet (73 m)
- Clearance below: 20 feet (6 m)

History
- Opened: 1952

Location
- Interactive map of Metaline Falls Bridge

The Metaline Falls Bridge carries Washington State Route 31 over the Pend Oreille River in the extreme northeast corner of the state. Officially named the Pend Oreille Bridge, it provides access from the south to the town of Metaline Falls and the Boundary Dam. Completed in 1952, the bridge is a 696 feet (212 m) long and 26 feet (7.9 m) wide combination steel truss and concrete T-beam structure. Consisting of three main Warren deck truss spans, the longest of which is 240 feet (73 m), the bridge carries two lanes of traffic and a pedestrian walkway.

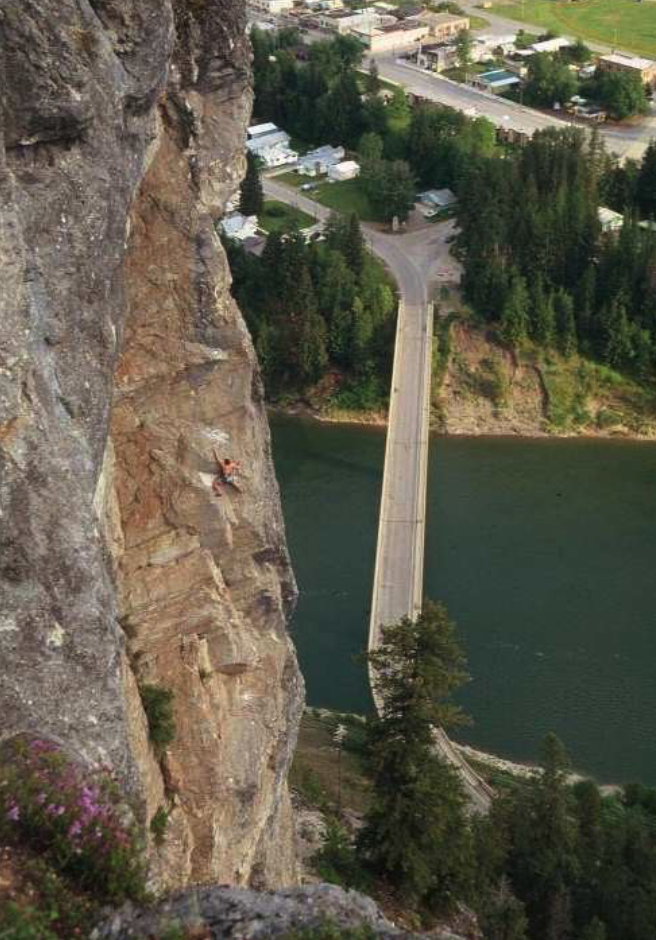
Metaline Falls/Metaline Falls Bridge taken from atop Washington Rock

The bridge is a key part of the Pacific Northwest Trail and the International Selkirk Loop, both of which attract many outdoor enthusiasts to the Metaline Falls area. Washington Rock, a favorite climbing venue in the region, is almost directly above the point where SR 31 turns southeast to enter the town which allows climbers to take almost vertical photos of the bridge. Eligible to be placed on the National Register of Historic Places, WSDOT currently classifies the bridge as Functionally Obsolete, The Federal Highway Administration using the National Bridge Inventory rating method, gave the bridge an overall acceptable grade in 2017, with its lowest rating "Fair" for superstructure condition.

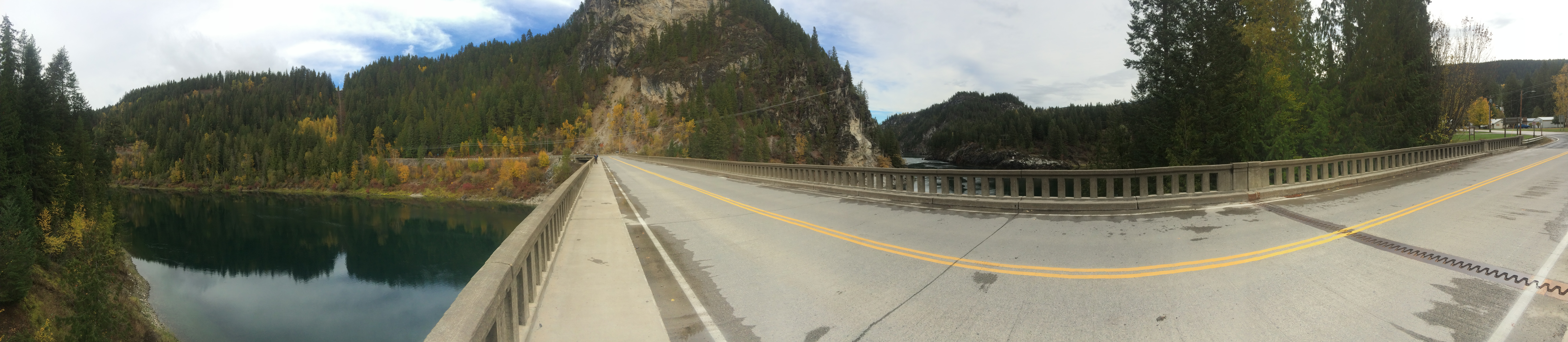
Panoramic view looking northwest at Washington Rock from the Metaline Falls Bridge
