= Across America =

Across America may refer to:

- Across America (album), a 1997 album by Art Garfunkel
- Across America, a mission of Solar Impulse in May 2013

== See also ==
- Coast to Coast (disambiguation)
- Transamerica (disambiguation)
- Trans Am (disambiguation)
