= Ellen K =

American radio personality

Ellen J. Thoe (born September 19, 1962), known professionally as Ellen K, is an American radio personality. She is the host of the Ellen K Morning Show on KOST 103.5 FM, and the nationally syndicated weekend program Ellen K Weekend Show. From April 1990 to October 2015, she worked at KOST's sister station 102.7 KIIS-FM, co-hosting the Rick Dees morning show and later On Air with Ryan Seacrest. On October 19, 2015, Ellen took over the morning show at KOST after longtime morning host Mark Wallengren moved to afternoons.

== History ==
Ellen J. Thoe was born in Palo Alto, California, on September 19, 1962. Her family lived in the area while her father, Dale Wesley Thoe, was a Ph.D. student at Stanford University. Thoe began her career in radio while in college after a year of collegiate swimming. Originally planning a career in Veterinary Science, she took an internship at a radio station, and after one fill-in shift behind the microphone she was hooked. She switched her major and graduated with honors in Radio/TV/Film from Purdue University. Over the years, larger market positions in radio convinced Ellen to move to various California radio stations, first in San Diego, then San Francisco, and finally in Los Angeles at KIIS-FM.

Ellen is a regular guest on the show The Talk and has participated in various productions such as the Grammys, the iHeartRadio Music Festival, the People's Choice Awards, and was most recently selected as the voice of the 92nd Academy Awards. Ellen also narrated My Big Fat Greek Wedding and My Big Fat American Gypsy Wedding on TLC. Ellen was honored with a star on The Hollywood Walk of Fame in 2012 for her work in radio.

Ellen K appeared as herself on The Wayne Brady Show as his sidekick for two seasons in 2003–2004 and EXTRA TV a few years earlier. Ellen hosted the nightly TV news segments on KTLA Ch 5 titled, "Inside Hollywood" in 2012.

On September 14, 2023, Ellen was the MC for rock star Yoshiki's imprint ceremony at the TCL Chinese Theatre in Hollywood.
