= Pacific Northwest Trail =

Hiking trail in the western United States

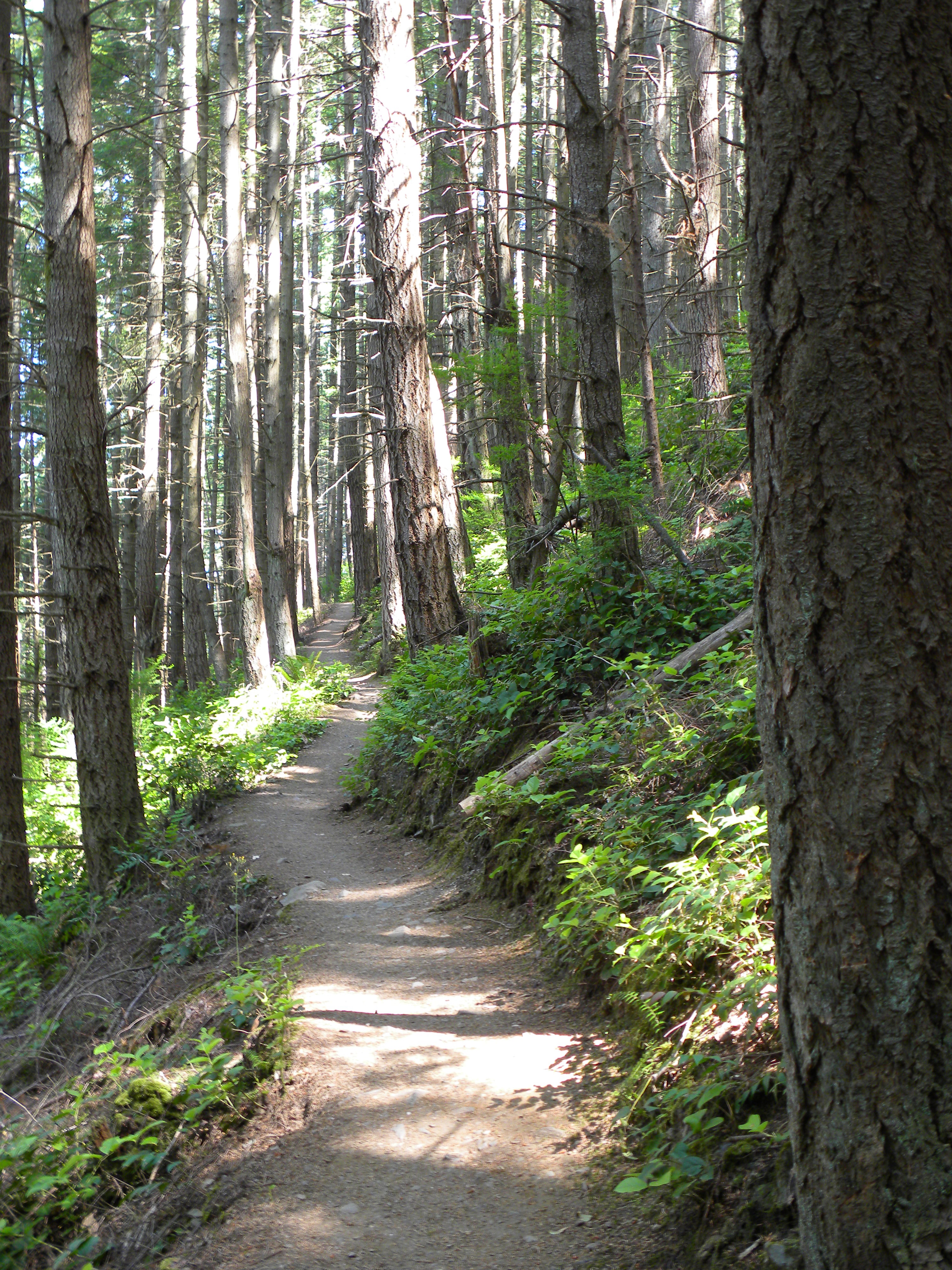
- The Pacific Northwest Trail
- Length: 1,200 mi (1,900 km)
- Location: Montana / Idaho / Washington, United States
- Designation: National Scenic Trail in 2009
- Trailheads: Glacier National Park, MT; Cape Alava, WA
- Use: Hiking; Mountain biking Equestrian
- Elevation gain/loss: 205,211 ft. (East - West) 210,427 ft. (West - East)
- Highest point: Cathedral Pass, Washington
- Lowest point: Pacific Ocean
- Difficulty: Easy to strenuous
- Season: Year-round at lower elevations, summer and fall at higher elevations
- Sights: Rocky Mountains; Mount Baker; Pacific Ocean
- Hazards: Severe weather Steep grades Navigation; Swift fords Grizzly bears Black bears Mountain lions Moose; Rattlesnakes

The Pacific Northwest Trail (PNT) is a 1,200-mile (1,900 km) hiking trail running from the Continental Divide in Montana to the Pacific Ocean on Washington's Olympic Coast. Along the way, the PNT crosses three national parks, seven national forests, and two other national scenic trails. It travels against the grain of several mountain ranges, including the Continental Divide, Whitefish Divide, Purcells, Selkirks, Kettles, Cascades, and Olympics. It was designated as the Pacific Northwest National Scenic Trail by Congress in 2009.

== History ==
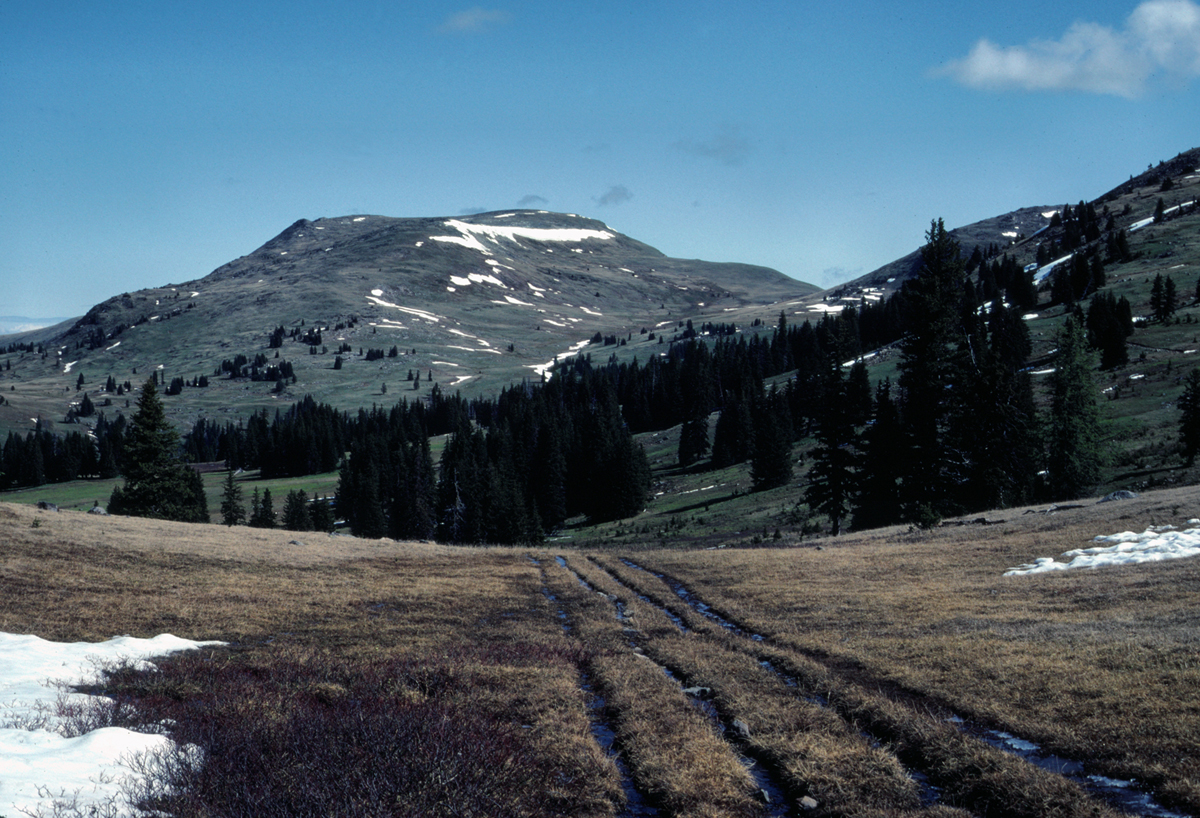
The Boundary Trail section of the PNT in Horseshoe Basin, Pasayten Wilderness

=== 1970s, 1980s, and 1990s ===
The route was first conceived by Ron Strickland in 1970. Between 1970 and 1976, extensive fieldwork was performed by Strickland and others, including early supporters along the PNT corridor who lent extensive knowledge of local trail systems to the effort. In that time, the Pacific Northwest Trail was cobbled together using preexisting trails and Forest Service roads.

In 1977, Strickland founded the Pacific Northwest Trail Association (PNTA), an organization responsible for education and information, maintenance, and advocacy for the PNT. That same year, the first five successful thru-hikes of the Pacific Northwest Trail were completed. Two of those hikers would later appear on the cover of Backpacker Magazine, in a 1979 issue that introduced the Pacific Northwest Trail to an international audience. Also in 1979, the first short guide for the PNT was published by Signpost Magazine, which would later become the Washington Trails Association. The guide consisted of two pages that described the route, and came unaccompanied by maps.

In 1977, Congress authorized a study to determine the feasibility and desirability of constructing a Pacific Northwest National Scenic Trail extending between the Continental Divide in Glacier National Park and the Pacific Ocean beach of Olympic National Park and designating it a unit of the National Trails System. The study, initiated in 1978, was conducted jointly by the National Park Service and U. S. Forest Service. Ideas were obtained from various individuals, groups, and agencies concerning possible locations for the trail, since no specific route was defined in the legislation authorizing the study. From the route ideas suggested, four alternatives were identified for analysis: (1) the most scenic route, (2) the least costly route, (3) the route having the minimum environmental impact, and (4) no trail.

Based on an evaluation of the four alternatives, the study determined that a Pacific Northwest Trail would have the scenic and recreational qualities needed for designation as a National Scenic Trail, but concluded that its construction was neither feasible nor desirable and recommended the "no trail" alternative. In arriving at this recommendation, the study found that little new recreation opportunity would be provided if a trail were constructed since extensive trail systems already exist throughout most of the study area; that the cost of land acquisition and construction would be excessive (from $64 million to $106 million based on a width averaging 1,000 feet and from $39 million to $60 million for a width averaging 500 feet) in comparison with the benefits which would result; and that there would be significant adverse environmental impacts on the grizzly bear and on fragile and frequently over-utilized high elevation areas.

Despite the report's determination, in 1983, Ron Strickland would hike the entire length of the PNT alongside the PNTA's first cartographer, Ted Hitzroth. They used the information collected on their journey to develop the first full-length guidebook for the PNT, which was published in 1984.

Throughout the 1980s and 1990s, the trail gained in popularity. Regional volunteer groups emerged to help the PNTA maintain and improve the PNT in their areas, including SWITMO (Skagit Whatcom Island Trail Maintenance Organization) in the Puget Sound area, and the Yaak Trail Club, who helped select and maintain the route through northwest Montana's Yaak Valley.

=== Into the 21st Century ===
In 2000, the Pacific Northwest Trail received its first federal designation, when the Clinton administration designated the trail as a National Millennium Trail. More federal recognition would come in the following years. In 2002, the North Cascades National Park / Ross Lake National Recreation Area segment was designated a National Recreation Trail. The Olympic National Park segment received this designation in 2003, and the Glacier National Park segment received the same designation in 2005.

In 2008, Congressman Norm Dicks and Senator Maria Cantwell introduced Pacific Northwest National Scenic Trail legislation to Congress. The marked up version of the legislation for the designation passed the full Natural Resource Committee of the US Senate on September 11, 2008, after the committee heard testimony from representatives of the PNTA and federal land management agencies who testified that concerns raised in the feasibility study had been adequately addressed. Original cost estimates and concerns over environmental impacts were based primarily on the construction of a new trail across the three states. In the time since the feasibility study had been conducted however, the route that would become designated as the Pacific Northwest National Scenic Trail had been connected utilizing pre-existing infrastructure, resulting in a great reduction in cost, and minimized environmental impact. The committee-approved legislation was then inserted into the Omnibus Public Lands Management Act. Congress passed the Omnibus Public Lands Management Act of 2009 on March 25 of that year, and the Pacific Northwest Trail became the Pacific Northwest National Scenic Trail with President Obama's signature on March 30, 2009.

The Public Lands Omnibus Act of 2009 placed the trail under the management of the Department of Agriculture, with the United States Forest Service serving as the trail administrator. When Congress designated the Pacific Northwest Trail in 2009, they also mandated that the forest service produce a management plan within two years. This management plan is required to determine the carrying capacity of the trail, and include public oversight. A FACA Committee intended to assist in establishing the management plan was not established until 2015, already 4 years past the date that it was required by law to have been implemented. The first in-person meeting of the FACA Committee was not held until October 2015 and it met three times. The committee charter expired in 2016, and another committee was not seated again until 2023, when the comprehensive plan was nearly complete.

The United States Forest Service announced the release of the Pacific Northwest Trail National Scenic Trail Comprehensive Plan which outlines a vision for the trail and provides guidance for its future management, protection, and use on December 12, 2023.

== Description of the route ==
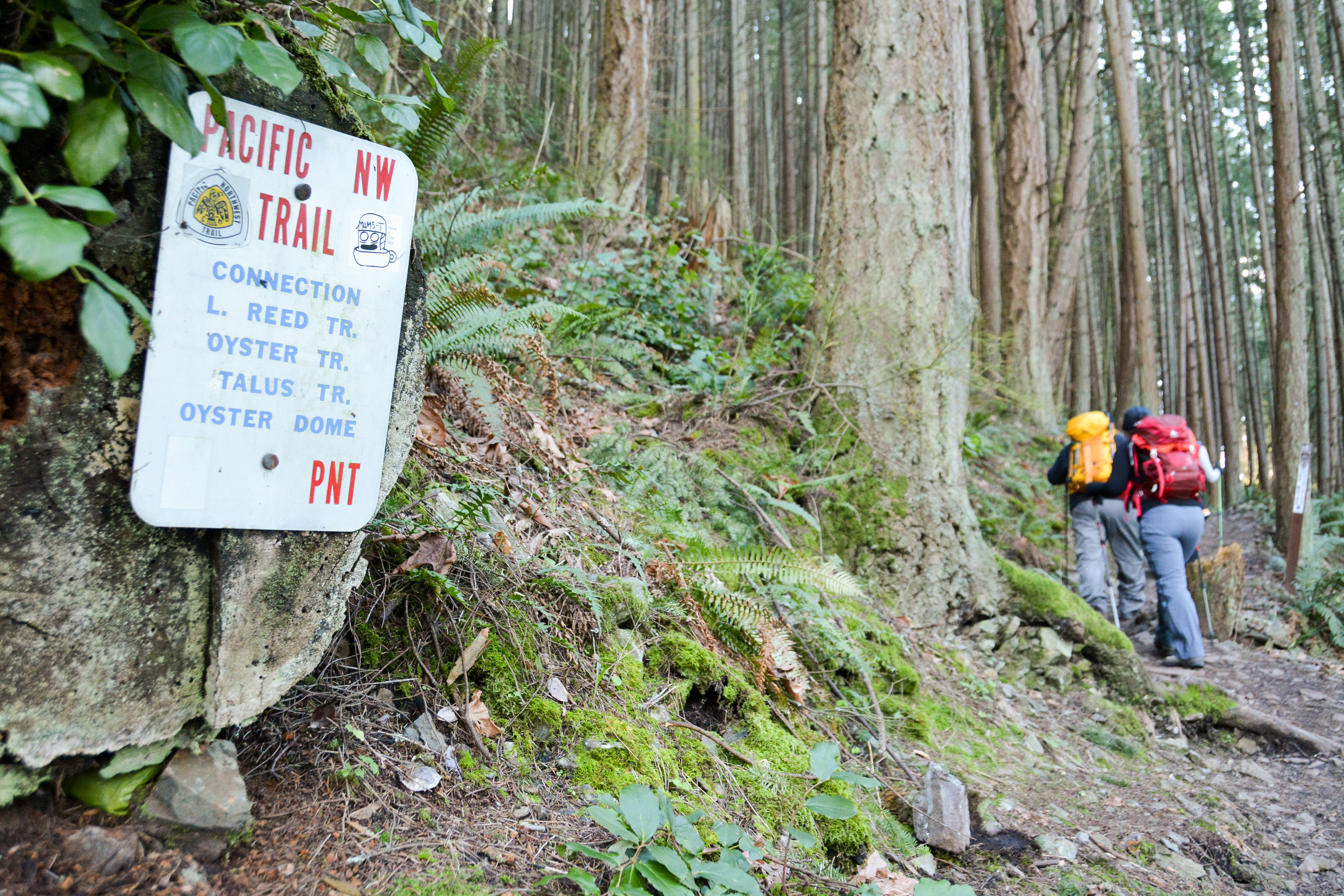
Pacific Northwest Trail at Blanchard Mountain in Washington

Beginning at Chief Mountain Customs on the United States–Canada border in northwest Montana, the Pacific Northwest Trail traverses the high mountains and valleys of Glacier National Park, where it shares mileage with the Continental Divide Trail. Then it enters Flathead National Forest, travels across the Flathead River into Polebridge, Montana, up the Whitefish Divide, into Kootenai National Forest, and through the Ten Lakes Wilderness Study Area on its way to the Idaho state line.

In Idaho Panhandle National Forest, the PNT crosses the Moyie River Valley, winds its way through the forest lands, dikes, and farmlands of the Kootenai River Valley, up Parker Ridge to the Selkirk Crest, then down Lions Head and over Lookout Mountain to Upper Priest Lake. From there, the trail climbs toward the Washington state line.

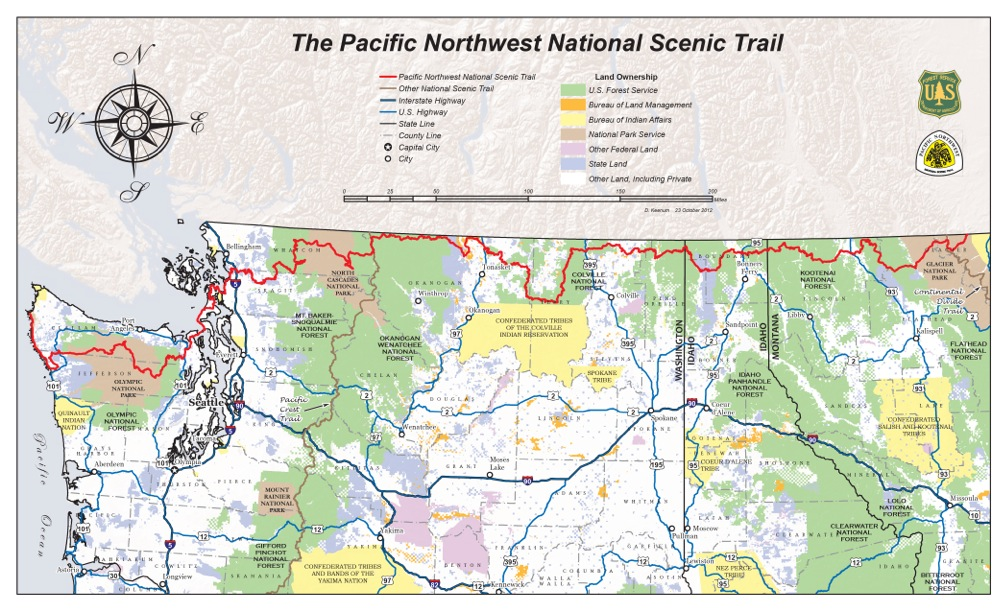
Pacific Northwest National Scenic Trail overview map

In Washington, the PNT enters Colville National Forest in the Salmo-Priest Wilderness, then crosses the Pend Oreille River on the Metaline Falls Bridge, before continuing over Abercrombie Mountain and reaching the Columbia River, in the town of Northport.

Next, the trail wends along the Kettle Crest, through Okanogan-Wenatchee National Forest and into the range lands and orchards of the Okanogan River Valley. From the city of Oroville, Washington, the PNT follows the Similkameen River to Palmer Lake, where the trail travels through Loomis State Forest, and then begins its ascent into the Pasayten Wilderness, where the PNT shares tread with the Pacific Crest Trail.

After traversing the Pasayten, the trail crosses Ross Lake National Recreation Area and North Cascades National Park. The trail exits the park via Hannegan Pass, and continues through the Mt. Baker Wilderness. From Mount Baker-Snoqualmie National Forest, the trail uses a mix of federal, state, and private timber lands to reach the shores of Puget Sound.

Along the dikes and through the farmlands of Skagit County, the trail traverses Fidalgo Island, crosses the bridge at Deception Pass State Park and continues across Whidbey Island to the Washington State Ferry Terminal in Coupeville, Washington.

After a thirty-minute ferry ride, the trail picks up in the seaside community of Port Townsend, Washington, and the confluence of three trails: the Larry Scott Trail, the Olympic Discovery Trail, and the Pacific Northwest Trail. The trails circumnavigate the northeastern tip of the Olympic Peninsula and Discovery Bay before going their separate directions, with the PNT turning southwest through Olympic National Forest, Buckhorn Wilderness and into Olympic National Park.

As the trail leaves the park and travels along the Bogachiel River it finds its way through the northern end of the Hoh Rain Forest to the Pacific Ocean at the mouth of the Hoh River. There, the trail turns north and wends along the wilderness coast where it enters the Quileute Indian Reservation near the town of La Push, then continues north to its western terminus at Cape Alava.

== Protected areas through which the PNT passes ==
- Glacier National Park
- Flathead National Forest
- Kootenai National Forest
- Idaho Panhandle National Forest
- Colville National Forest
- Okanogan–Wenatchee National Forest
- North Cascades National Park
- Paysayten Wilderness
- Ross Lake National Recreation Area
- Mt. Baker-Snoqualmie National Forest
- Deception Pass State Park
- Bay View State Park
- Joseph Whidbey State Park
- Fort Ebey State Park
- Ebey's Landing National Historical Reserve
- Fort Casey State Park
- Olympic National Forest
- Olympic National Park

== See also ==
Connected National Scenic Trails

- Continental Divide Trail - Shares a common start/end point with the PNT in Glacier National Park.
- Pacific Crest Trail - Shares mileage in the Pasayten Wilderness.

Connected U.S. long-distance trails

- Olympic Discovery Trail
