= Kim Amidon =

American radio personality

- Born: 20th century
- Occupations: Radio personality and radio show host
- Years active: 1980–present

Kim Amidon (born 20th century) is an American radio personality, known for her work on the Most Music Mornings on KOST 103.5 in Los Angeles, California, co-hosting with Mark Wallengren.

In 2006, she and Wallengren both received together a "star" on the Hollywood Walk of Fame for their work on the radio.

On November 29, 2007, after nearly 22 years of co-hosting the KOST Morning Show with Wallengren, Amidon's contract was not renewed.

As of December 2008, she was heard on KRTH-FM in Los Angeles, but only during the holidays.

In February 2010, she joined 94.7 The Wave (KTWV-FM) for weekends and fill-in. She became part of the Pat and Kim morning show, Monday–Friday, 5–9 AM, in May before leaving the station in May 2012.
