= PAMS =

American jingle production company

PAMS Productions, Inc. (an acronym for Production, Advertising and Merchandising Service), based in Dallas, Texas, was one of the most famous jingle production companies in American broadcasting. It produced identification packages for radio stations around the world, as well as some commercial music.

== History ==
The company was founded by William B. Meeks, Jr. (1921–1999) in 1951.

Meeks worked on the air and also sold advertising, often creating jingles for some of the clients he sold time to. Eventually he decided to devote all his time to advertising, and in 1951 he started PAMS Advertising Agency, Inc. Initially, very few station jingles were made, and it wasn't until the mid-1950s that individual cuts were assembled into packages that could be syndicated to stations all over the country.

After the success of the first few PAMS jingle series, the company's focus slowly shifted to providing IDs to the ever growing number of top-40 radio stations. By the end of 1964, PAMS' primary business had become station jingles, and the name of the company was shortened to PAMS, Inc.

Soon, PAMS was a leader in the usage of pre-recorded backing tracks with new vocals over them to create the syndication of ID Jingles.

It suspended operation in 1978, and for the next 12 years, PAMS jingles were produced under the CPMG/PAMS moniker run by Ken R. Deutsch (in Toledo, Ohio) and Benjamin R. Freedman (December 26, 1949—January 9, 2013) (both in the Buffalo, New York, area and Dallas, Texas). In 1990, the original PAMS corporation, including all its copyrights, was purchased by JAM Creative Productions (also based in Dallas).

JAM currently produces new versions of the classic PAMS jingle packages over the original PAMS backing tracks but technically is still a separate company from PAMS. JAM founder Jonathan M. Wolfert was employed by PAMS before he and wife Mary Lyn Wolfert started their own company in 1974.

Many of PAMS jingle packages were used exclusively in the 1960s and early 1970s by stations worldwide, including WABC in New York City, WLS in Chicago, European offshore radio stations like Wonderful Radio London and Swinging Radio England, and BBC Radio 1 and Radio 2 in the United Kingdom, KLCBS FM Bandung in Indonesia.

PAMS address was just as famous as its jingles. The studios were located at 4141 Office Parkway, which is now part of the Cityplace district of Dallas. It was also the home of Thompson Creative which entered the radio station ID business in the mid-1980s.

== See also ==
- Euel Box
- JAM Creative Productions, the later successor and owner of PAMS.
