= William B. Meeks Jr. =

William Bruce Meeks Jr.
- Also known as: William Bruce Meeks II
- Born: March 2, 1921; Terrell, Texas, United States
- Died: September 8, 1999 (aged 78); Portland, Maine, United States
- Occupation(s): Producer, composer, arranger

William Bruce Meeks Jr. (aka William Bruce Meeks II; March 2, 1921 – September 8, 1999) was an American producer, composer and arranger of radio jingles and founder of PAMS in Dallas; which, according to Billboard in 1972, was the largest jingles firm in the world.

Meeks was also a keen woodwind, flute, and saxophone player. In addition, he was an expert in music physics.

== Biography ==
He was born on March 2, 1921, in Terrell, Texas. He graduated from Dallas' Sunset High School and the University of North Texas College of Music, and was an Army-Air Force World War 2 veteran.

Bill worked in radio, both as a broadcaster and also selling advertising. He would often create jingles for some of the clients he sold time to. Eventually, he decided to devote all his time to advertising, and in 1951, he started his own company called "PAMS Advertising Agency, Inc".

For several years, PAMS created commercials and sold air time for a variety of clients and very few station jingles were made. But in the mid-1950s, the radio ID side of the business took off, and previously made individual cuts were assembled into packages that were then syndicated to stations all over America.

After the success of the first few PAMS jingle series, the company's focus slowly shifted to providing IDs to the ever growing number of top-40 radio stations. By the end of 1964, PAMS' primary business had become station jingles, and the name of the company was shortened to PAMS, Inc.

Not all of Meeks's ideas worked and not all his ventures were financially successful, but many of them touched the lives of millions of radio listeners, even though most outside of the industry don't know his name. Bill ran PAMS for 27 years before suspending operations in 1978. PAMS jingles were later produced by Ken R. Deutsch and Ben Freedman under the CPMG/PAMS moniker. In 1990, following court hearings, the original PAMS corporation, including all its copyrights, was purchased by JAM Creative Productions in Dallas.

== Family ==
William Bruce Meeks Jr. was born to William Bosse Meeks (1893–1981) and Ola Lema Nations (1892–1987). He had a brother – Charles Holten Meeks (September 7, 1922 – July 27, 1976) – born to the same marriage.

William Bruce Meeks Jr. married Marjorie Ann Staggs (December 18, 1924, Abbeville, Louisiana – June 7, 2011, Dallas, Texas) on August 11, 1943, and together, they had three children: Dennis Bruce Meeks (aka Dennis Bruce Meeks, Sr.) (September 13, 1945 – November 25, 2014 in Myrtle Beach, South Carolina), Anita Louise Meeks, and Jeanne Marie Meeks (April 9, 1958 – August 7, 1994, Dallas, Texas). Bill Meeks died of cancer on September 8, 1999.
