= KVNA-FM =

Coordinates: 34.968°N 111.509°W

- Flagstaff, Arizona; United States
- Broadcast area: Flagstaff-Prescott, Arizona
- Frequency: 100.1 MHz
- Branding: Peak 100.1

Programming
- Format: Adult contemporary

Ownership
- Owner: Yavapai Broadcasting Corporation
- Sister stations: KKLD; KQST; KVNA; KVRD-FM; KYBC

History
- First air date: 1999 (as KLOD)
- Former call signs: KLOD (1999–2005)
- Call sign meaning: "Voice of Northern Arizona" (from KVNA AM)

Technical information
- Licensing authority: FCC
- Facility ID: 21693
- Class: C2
- ERP: 5,300 watts
- HAAT: 437 meters (1,434 ft)
- Translators: 92.1 K221GL (Prescott); 93.3 K227AP (Cottonwood)

Links
- Public license information: Public file; LMS
- Webcast: Listen live
- Website: myradioplace.com/the-peak-100-1/

KVNA-FM (100.1 FM, "Peak 100.1") is a commercial radio station in Flagstaff, Arizona, broadcasting an adult contemporary format. It is one of six radio stations in the Flagstaff-Prescott region of Northern Arizona owned by the Yavapai Broadcasting Corporation.

== History ==
In the summer of 1999, 100.1 MHz signed on broadcasting the syndicated LoudRadio hard rock format, under the call sign KLOD. KLOD was the first station in the United States to broadcast an online commercial radio network. LoudRadio was launched by veteran broadcaster Guy Giuliano, via the Napa, California-based eMusic company.

In the spring of 2001, the format was changed to smooth jazz branded as "The Cat". The new format was programmed by veteran entertainer Robert Shields. The format lasted less than one year as programming was changed to hot adult contemporary branded as "Star 100.1".

On January 1, 2005, the format was changed to adult contemporary and branded as "Sunny 100", adopting the format that was formerly on KVNA-FM 97.5 before it moved to Dewey-Humboldt to serve the Phoenix area. On May 18, 2005, the KVNA-FM call sign was assigned to this station.

On December 30, 2014, at midnight, the "Sunny" adult contemporary format moved to KVNA (600 AM), along with its FM translator station on 104.7, while 100.1 FM flipped to adult album alternative music, branded as "100.One, Arizona's Adult Alternative". The first song on 100.One, according to the online playlist, was I'm Not the Only One by Sam Smith.

On March 17, 2025, KVNA-FM reverted to adult contemporary as "Peak 100.1"; the current iteration is a gold-heavy format focused primarily on 1980s to 2000s pop music, with a markedly smaller focus on more recent music.
