= Transamérica Media Company =

Brazilian radio network

TMC
- Type: Broadcast radio network
- Country: Brazil
- Headquarters: São Paulo, São Paulo

Programming
- Language(s): Portuguese
- Format: Music; adult contemporary; rock

Ownership
- Owner: Transamérica Produções Ltda.
- Operator: Grupo Camargo de Comunicação
- Sister stations: 89 FM A Rádio Rock; Alpha FM; Rádio Disney
- Key people: João Camargo; Neneto Camargo

History
- Founded: August 21, 1976 by Aloysio de Andrade Faria
- Former names: Transamérica FM (1976–2000); Rede Transamérica (2000–2025)

Links
- Website: tmc.com.br

Transamérica Media Company, called by the acronym TMC, is a Brazilian radio network based in São Paulo, with programming focused on entertainment and sports broadcasts, belonging to the Grupo Camargo de Comunicação. The network was established by the Conglomerado Alfa, controlled by businessman Aloysio de Andrade Faria, following the inauguration of Transamérica FM in Recife and, later, Transamérica FM in Brasília, both in 1976. The chain of owned stations also has branches in the cities of São Paulo, Curitiba, Rio de Janeiro and Belo Horizonte. Until 2024, it had a branch in Salvador.

For decades, Transamérica was geared towards CHR, with various musical genres (pop, rock, hip hop, etc). Between 1999 and 2019, the network was split up and became known as Pop (aimed at CHR, pop-style audiences), Hits (aimed at the popular segment) and Light (aimed at the adult contemporary segment). With the rapid growth of the popular strand, Rede Transamérica became the largest radio network in the country (in this segment). Since August 2019, the network has been unified again and is now formatted for young/adult contemporary audiences (focused on pop/rock music), with a sports focus.

== History ==
Advertisement published in the newspaper Diário do Paraná on February 17, 1977, announcing the debut of Transamérica FM in Curitiba. Other similar ads were published at the same time to publicize the launches of the other branches.

=== 1976-1985: Early years ===
Rádio Transamérica FM began its activities on August 21, 1976, with the launch of its first own station in Recife, the first FM station to be installed in the capital of Pernambuco and the first in the Northeast region of the country. With the station's debut in Brasília, the Rede Transamérica de Rádio was formed.

In the beginning, its format was adult contemporary music radio, aimed at A and B class listeners over the age of 25. The musical modules consisted of three songs, one sung (a hit at the time), one MPB song and one nostalgic or orchestrated song. Also produced was Informativo Transamérica, short bulletins with information from the economic/financial area. All the programming was recorded in São Paulo at Estúdio Transamérica (also known for being the main space for recording jingles and commercials, as well as LPs by well-known artists) and sent via reel-to-reel tapes to the branches. In August 1978, the Transamérica FM network was already considered the leader in terms of audience in almost all the cities (with the exception of Transamérica FM in Rio de Janeiro), with branches in São Paulo (the network's headquarters) and Curitiba.

From 1979 onwards, Rede Transamérica's audience began to decline, mainly due to the growth of the FM dial in the areas where it operated. At this time, it switched from music programming to dance music. At the beginning of 1980, it had its first friction with Ibope when it broke with the company and asked for the station to be removed from bulletins and surveys because it "disagreed with the methods and systems adopted [...] to measure and report on radio audiences." At that time, it launched its last branch in Salvador, Bahia, and its network already had partner stations that received content produced by Transamérica.

=== 1985-1999: Investment in young audiences and comedy programming ===
After gradual implementation, Rede Transamérica was already targeting young audiences in 1985. At this time, recorded programming ceased to exist and gave way to live local programming in each branch. Under the network's guidelines, the programs had to follow a humorous line, and Transamérica's trademark became the "scathing humor" and debauchery of the broadcasters with the listeners. Parodies of hit songs also became popular at the time. The change had an immediate impact on the public and the audience grew, causing the network to once again compete with the main broadcasters. Despite their success, Transamérica's announcers were constantly criticized for jokes that were considered "crude" or "in bad taste." In 1987, Rede Transamérica adopted the visual identity that marked the station in the following years (a stylized "T" in red).

In January 1990, Rede Transamérica began broadcasting via satellite and made its first investment in sports, covering its first World Cup, using its own characteristics and language and relying on its regular announcers to narrate the matches. In 1995, the network launched a new affiliate in Belo Horizonte, after buying Scalla FM. Despite its success and the growth of affiliates with satellite transmission, the audience fell again in several places as a result of the growth of popular radio stations, which were at their peak investing in axé, samba and pagode, which motivated the network to invest in new genres of music, such as Brazilian rock. In 1997, the music grid adopted its current format with a combination of various styles of music, such as rock, reggae, dance and pop music.

=== 1999-2019: Division into branches ===
At the end of the 1990s, Transamérica implemented a growth strategy, launching diversified programming formats, broadcast via satellite to different audiences. With new artistic possibilities, the broadcaster expanded its national operations through the franchise system. This strategy was taken because of the flight of affiliates to popular formats, which began their heyday at this time. In 1999, Transamérica Light was launched, with adult-contemporary programming, and its first station was the former Exclusiva FM in Curitiba. In 2000, Transamérica Pop was officially launched, with stations that continued with traditional programming. On June 5, 2000, the popular strand Transamérica Hits was launched. In July 2000, the conglomerate closed the purchase of Grupo Exclusiva de Curitiba, incorporating TV Exclusiva (which became TV Transamérica), Exclusiva FM (which was already affiliated with Transamérica Light, officially becoming a subsidiary) and Exclusiva Produtora. The broadcaster also began to invest more in sport and in 2001 launched Transamérica Esportes, a team responsible for broadcasting soccer matches and programs of this kind. This division had a place in the network's programming together with Transamérica Hits and Pop, sometimes taking turns with the Light strand on sports days. The Transamérica Esportes team is active on stations in São Paulo, Curitiba, Recife, Rio de Janeiro and Belo Horizonte, as well as some affiliates.

Despite the divisions, Rede Transamérica continued for a few years to play songs of varied rhythms in some strands, such as pop and rock music in Hits or Pop versions. In a short time, Transamérica Hits became the network's biggest strand, increasing the number of affiliates and gaining stations that were on the Pop carrier. By 2006, it was already considered to be the largest popular radio network in the country. Of the two strands, Transamérica Light had the hardest time getting affiliates and did little to expand across the country.

Transamérica broadcast the 2014 FIFA World Cup on its three carriers (Pop, Hits and Light), from June 12 to July 13, with professionals who are a reference in sports journalism, led by Eder Luiz and José Carlos Araújo, Garotinho. In the last 10 years, the experience with the Transamérica brand has been more intense, through digital media, especially social networks, which are used as a way of building relationships and sharing content with followers.

=== 2019-2024: Format change and reunification ===
In June 2019, Rede Transamérica began to implement changes in the programming of the Pop carrier, transforming the musical programming and voice-over into a style close to adult-contemporary. On July 3, the network started to unify the Pop and Hits strands during the early morning hours (between 11pm and 4am) with pop/rock music programming, extinguishing the traditional Clube da Insônia. Confirming the launch of a new phase in its programming, on July 12 Transamérica dismissed announcers Gislaine Martins (Artistic Manager) and Ricardo Sam (Artistic Coordinator), who had worked at the station since 1997 and were recognized on the Pop carrier. Later, it announced Luiz Augusto Alper as artistic coordinator of the new programming. On July 16, Transamérica confirmed more changes to its programming, announcing the hiring of broadcaster Pedro Trucão and the end of programs such as Desperta and Esporte de Primeira, as well as a new format defined as "contemporary young adult", which according to the network has been growing in recent years.

On July 22, Transamérica confirmed the beginning of the gradual unification of the Hits and Pop carriers, returning to the way they worked before the split. It was also confirmed that the new music programming will be made up of rock and pop hits (national and international), with the aim of reaching and attracting audiences aged between 25 and 49. The communiqué mentions that the unification and adaptation of the stations will not be abrupt, respecting “the commercial and artistic commitments made individually by the affiliated stations” and that the affiliates will have a maximum period of 150 days from August 1. On the same day that the communiqué was issued, the network also ended the programs Transalouca, Conectados and Sarcófago.

On August 5, work officially began on the new Rede Transamérica. The first station to join the project was the Belo Horizonte branch, which returned with the "Pop" project after 10 years as a popular station. The new programming officially began at 4 a.m., when Trucão com o Pé na Estrada premiered. From that day on, all the stations that worked as Transamérica Pop began the transition phase to the project, dropping the nomenclature for good. In the same week, three other stations from the Hits carrier also joined the new format. In September, five more stations joined the new project, while other affiliates announced affiliations with Band FM and Clube FM (which began the satellite network process). In December 2019, Transamérica debuted a new package of vignettes, redesigned by Fernando Deeplick. These vignettes are reminiscent of the classic package used by Rede Transamérica in the early 1990s. Rede Transamérica's last separate broadcast took place on December 31, 2019. From 11pm on the same date, the entire operation was unified in the “young/adult contemporary” format.

==== 2020-2023: Partnership with CNN Brasil and network reorganization ====
In August 2020, the network announced a partnership with CNN Brasil to produce news content in the morning and evening, as well as bulletins throughout the program, called Breaking News. The partnership consolidated the arrival of the CNN Radio format in Brazil. This announcement caused a new rearrangement in the network's programming, since Transamérica would now dedicate 7 hours a day to broadcasting news content. The new change also had an impact on the affiliate network, which saw a further reduction in the number of stations that did not accept the loss of the local slot to the news network.

In September, still during the formatting period of the new program, Transamérica announced an affiliate in Aracaju. The debut of Transamérica Aracaju, which took place on November 16, 2020, marked the first affiliate inauguration since the implementation of the young/adult contemporary project. Also in September, Transamérica and CNN announced that the company RadioData would be responsible for expanding the CNN Rádio project's network of affiliates. After a few postponements due to technical issues, CNN Radio debuted on Rede Transamérica on October 13, 2020. However, due to the network's adaptation process, some affiliates continued to broadcast music programming generated from São Paulo. Because of this, CNN Radio was restricted to the branches of Rede Transamérica and selected affiliates. The broadcast of CNN Radio became mandatory on the network as of January 1, 2021. In March 2021, the program Trucão com o Pé na Estrada left Transamérica's schedule and premiered on Massa FM.

CNN Radio's programming on Transamérica occupied two programming blocks, in the morning (from 6 a.m. to noon, with two programs broadcast) and early evening (from 6 p.m. to 7:30 p.m.). Initially, the evening program had an exclusive radio show, which ended up giving way, in November 2020, to the partial rebroadcast of CNN Primetime with Márcio Gomes. The program ceased to be broadcast in the time slot after changes in the TV schedule made it unfeasible to rebroadcast it on the radio. The slot was once again occupied by Transamérica's regular schedule, making CNN Rádio restricted to the morning slot.

Starting in 2023, CNN Rádio will adjust its broadcast schedule, beginning at 5 a.m. and ending at 11 a.m., also marking the debut of a new sports and humor program by Transamérica in the 11 a.m. to noon slot. In July 2023, CNN Rádio's schedule was reduced again, with only four hours a day on Transamérica's schedule (5am to 9am), with the broadcast of CNN Manhã. Gradually, the affiliate network stopped broadcasting CNN's space and began airing its own schedule. On December 15, 2023, CNN and Transamérica announced the end of the content partnership, where the music network announced that it was returning "to its focus on entertainment and sports programming, a mix that, despite the valuable and productive partnership with CNN for news, has always been its greatest strength". At the same time, the end of the partnership was also caused by changes at CNN itself, which dismissed professionals from TV and the radio project.

=== 2024-present: Network reorganization and sale of assets ===
From 2024, Rede Transamérica began a new artistic repositioning, emphasizing the adult contemporary format in its music programming, different from the one implemented in 2019. The changes also included a new look, a new voice-over format, a new logo design and a focus on audiences over the age of 35. In July 2024, the sale of the Salvador branch to local businessmen Ana Coelho (CEO of Grupo Aratu), Ricardo Luzbel and Léo Góes was announced. In August 2024, Transamérica ceased operations in the city, and the Antena 1 radio network took its place.

In February 2024, the acquisition of Rede Transamérica by Grupo Camargo de Comunicação (GC2), led by the brothers Neneto and João Camargo, was announced. The purchase was signed on January 31 and formalized on February 3, requiring only the approval of CADE.
