= Ron Strickland =

American conservationist and author

Ron Strickland (born March 19, 1943) is an American conservationist, long distance trail developer, and author. He is the founder of the 1,200-mile (1,900 km) Pacific Northwest National Scenic Trail (PNT) and of the proposed transcontinental Sea-to-Sea Route. He is the author of nine books including his 2011 memoir Pathfinder: Blazing a New Wilderness Trail in Modern America.

== Education and career ==
Born Ronald Gibson Strickland in Providence, Rhode Island, Strickland attended Tower Hill School in Wilmington, Delaware, and graduated with three degrees from Georgetown University. Strickland wrote his dissertation about the politics of the National Wilderness Preservation System. He developed an early passion for backpacking that led, in 1970, to his desire to develop an east–west hiking trail from the Continental Divide to the Pacific Ocean. He incorporated the Pacific Northwest Trail Association in 1977, and was its executive director for twenty years. In 1984 and 2001 he published the first and second editions of the Pacific Northwest Trail Guide. In March 2009, Congress added the Pacific Northwest National Scenic Trail into the National Trails System where it is now a permanent part of America's national heritage.

Strickland's most ambitious project has been his proposed Atlantic Ocean to Pacific Ocean Sea-To-Sea Route. In 1996, he wrote that when completed it would provide a transcontinental framework for the hitherto disparate long distance trails of the National Trails System. In 2005, thru-hiker Andrew Skurka hiked it straight through from east to west in 11 months.

Strickland's awards include the $10,000 Chevron Conservation Award, the $50,000 American Land Conservation Award, the 2008 National Trails Symposium's Lifetime Service Award, and the 2010 LL Bean Outdoor Heroes Award. The Pacific Northwest Trail is a story of "unstinting devotion...Ron Strickland's tale fits the landscape through which he traveled: out of scale, and a bit bigger than life usually is.".

He and his wife, author Christine W. Hartmann, live in Bedford, Massachusetts.

== Publications ==
- The North Country Trail: The Best Walks, Hikes, and Backpacking Trips on America's Longest National Scenic Trail. (Ann Arbor, MI: University of Michigan Press, 2013)
- Pathfinder: Blazing a new Wilderness Trail in Modern America. (Corvallis, OR: Oregon State University Press, 2011)
- The Pacific Northwest Trail Guide, 2nd Ed. (Seattle: Sasquatch Books, 2001)
- Shank's Mare: A Compendium of Remarkable Walks, (New York: Paragon House, 1988)
- Vermonters: Oral Histories from Down Country to the Northeast Kingdom, (San Francisco: Chronicle Books, 1986; Hanover, NH: University Press Of New England, 1998)
- River Pigs and Cayuses: Oral Histories from the Pacific Northwest, (San Francisco: Lexikos, 1984; Corvallis, OR: Oregon State University Press, 2001)
- Whistlepunks & Geoducks: Oral Histories from the Pacific Northwest, (New York: Paragon House, 1990; Corvallis, OR: Oregon State University Press, 2001)
- Texans: Oral Histories from the Lone Star State, (New York: Paragon House, 1991)
- Alaskans: Oral Histories from the Last Frontier, (Harrisburg, PA: Stackpole Books, 1992)
