= KOST =

Adult contemporary radio station in Los Angeles

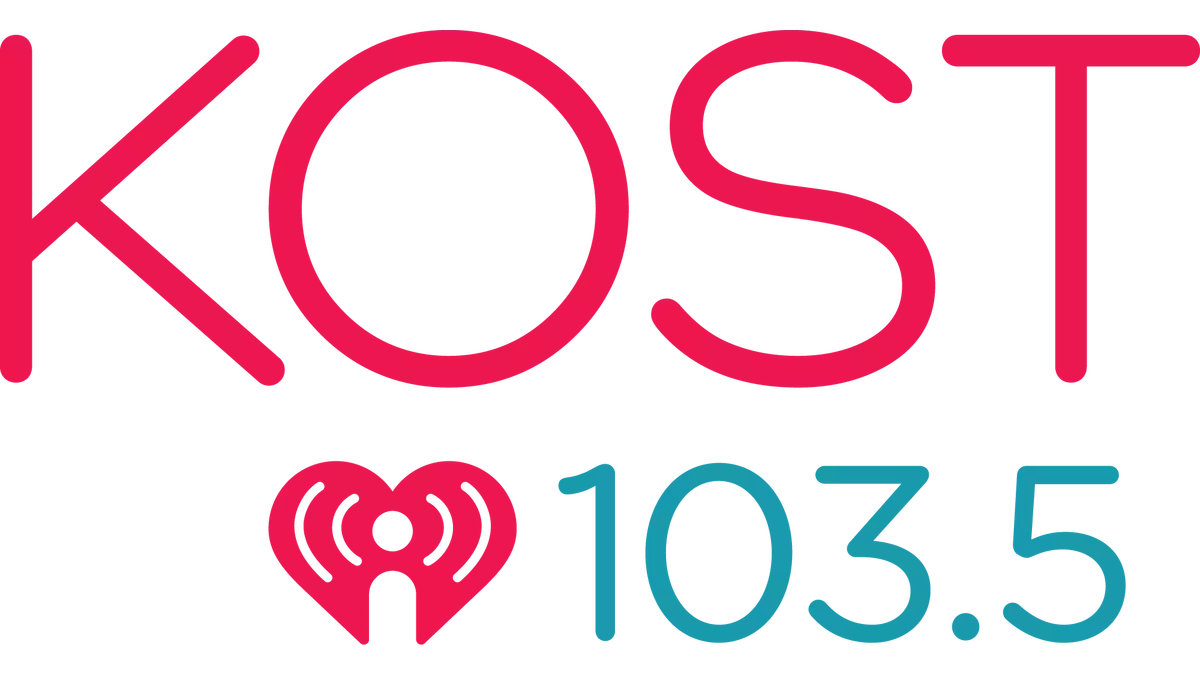
- Los Angeles, California; United States
- Broadcast area: Greater Los Angeles
- Frequency: 103.5 MHz (HD Radio)
- RDS: KOST1035
- Branding: KOST 103.5

Programming
- Language: English
- Format: Adult contemporary
- Subchannels: HD2: Talk radio (KFI)

Ownership
- Owner: iHeartMedia; (iHM Licenses, LLC)
- Sister stations: KBIG; KEIB; KFI; KIIS-FM; KLAC; KRRL; KSRY; KVVS; KYSR

History
- First air date: August 8, 1957
- Former call signs: KFSG-FM (CP, 1956–1957); KPUL (CP, 1957); KGLA (1957–1966); KADS (1966–1967)
- Call sign meaning: Sounds like "coast"

Technical information
- Licensing authority: FCC
- Facility ID: 34424
- Class: B
- ERP: 11,500 watts
- HAAT: 949 meters (3,114 ft)
- Transmitter coordinates: 34°13′35.3″N 118°4′0.9″W
- Translator: See § Translators and booster

Links
- Public license information: Public file; LMS
- Webcast: Listen live (via iHeartRadio); HD2: Listen live (via iHeartRadio)
- Website: kost1035.iheart.com

KOST (103.5 MHz) is a commercial radio station in Los Angeles, California. Owned by iHeartMedia, it broadcasts an adult contemporary radio format, switching to Christmas music in early November and ending a few days after Christmas Day (or after Christmas Day, if the holiday either falls on a Sunday or on a Monday). Its studios are co-located with its sister stations on West Olive Avenue in Burbank. KOST is the home of Ellen K, segments of whose morning show are syndicated to other iHeart AC stations on Saturday mornings.

The transmitter is atop Mount Wilson alongside most L.A. based television and FM radio stations. Those FM stations, along with KOST, are considered "superpower" grandfathered stations, since their effective radiated power (ERP) greatly exceeds the level set by the Federal Communications Commission for Class B FM stations at their height on Mount Wilson. KOST broadcasts using HD Radio technology. The HD2 digital subchannel rebroadcasts co-owned talk radio station KFI.

== History ==
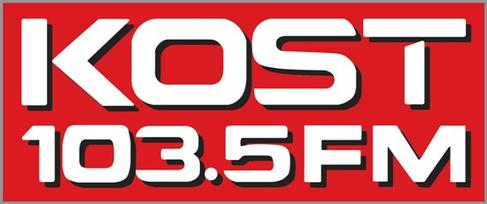
KOST 103.5 logo used until 2013.

=== Early years ===
On August 8, 1957, the station first signed on as KGLA.

Noted radio programmer Gordon McLendon bought KGLA in 1966, changing the call letters to KADS that November. McLendon, with permission from the Federal Communications Commission, experimented with an all-advertisement format, hence the call sign choice. One of its features was that listeners could purchase their own commercials on KADS, not unlike classified advertising in a newspaper. FM radios were still not widely owned in the 1960s and the experimental format was not successful.

=== Beautiful music ===
In October 1967, the station adopted the KOST-FM call sign, along with a substantially all-music format (i.e., no news bulletins), which was unusual, if not unique, given then-prevailing license obligations to broadcast at least some news. The station aired a mostly-instrumental beautiful music format paired with XETRA in Tijuana, to which McLendon had sales management rights. In 1975, Cox Communications purchased KOST to pair with its newly-bought KFI (640 AM). KOST, with its call sign pronounced "coast" in a stage whisper, continued its easy listening format through the 1970s. This popular format was also heard on rivals KJOI (98.7 FM) and KBIG (104.3).

In the early 1980s, KOST gradually added more vocals, and on November 15, 1982, the station switched to an adult contemporary format, signing on with "You Can Do Magic" by America as its first song. Former Sacramento radio personality Bryan Simmons was KOST's first host when the station signed on with its new format.

From 1985 until 2012, KOST has been using jingles from JAM Creative Productions, in which they have made 17 jingle packages for 27 years. Not counting the work they did for BBC Radio 1 and 2, JAM has made the most jingles for a radio station, that being of KOST, with WLS AM and FM coming in a close 2nd place.

On February 3, 1986, Mark Wallengren and Kim Amidon made their debut as KOST's new morning hosts. The Mark & Kim Morning Show was one of the longest-running shows on Los Angeles radio, airing for more than 20 years until ending in 2007.

=== AMFM/Clear Channel/iHeartMedia era ===
In September 1999, Cox Communications swapped KOST and sister station KFI with AMFM, Inc. for 14 stations in several East Coast markets. AMFM was then purchased by Clear Channel Communications in 2000. (In 2014, the company's name was changed to iHeartMedia, Inc.) Over the years, particularly in the late 2000s and into the 2010s, the station would shift to a more upbeat mainstream AC format. Despite the changes, KOST has continued to garner solid ratings. Christmas music has been aired from early November through Christmas Day since 2001.

KOST experienced little air staff turnover until the 2000s. On November 29, 2007, morning show co-host Kim Amidon departed the station. This was followed by KOST's original midday host Mike Sakellarides (who moved on to KTWV) and longtime traffic reporter Mike Nolan (who was eventually rehired at KOST). In October 2008, former KYXY San Diego radio personality Kristin Cruz joined Mark Wallengren as co-host of KOST's morning show. Cruz left the station in May 2014. In 2009, the midday shift was voice-tracked by former WLTW New York City personality Karen Carson.

In February 2011, Carson resigned to join CBS Radio-owned WWFS in New York. Both Christine Martindale (2 days per week) and Ted Ziegenbusch (3 days per week) filled in on the midday show until August 2011, when former KBIG midday host Kari Steele took over. Steele now hosts KOST's public affairs program The Sunday Journal broadcasting every Sunday following Animal Radio, providing interviews with community organizations. Also in August, longtime KOST afternoon personality Bryan Simmons left KOST. Simmons had been on the station since 1982, except between 2002 and 2004, when he hosted the Boogie Nights show at KBIG. Ted Ziegenbusch filled in for several months after Simmons departed.

In December 2012, Christine Martindale was among the radio personalities laid off from Clear Channel stations. On January 17, 2013, it was announced that Martindale would join KKGO (105.1); her first day at Go Country 105 was February 4.

Ellen K, a former co-host on the KIIS-FM morning show and On Air with Ryan Seacrest, took over the KOST morning show on October 19, 2015. Mark Wallengren, who had been part of the KOST morning show since 1986, moved to afternoons, replacing Bruce Scott, who had been with station since 2012.

Longtime DJs Mark Wallengren and Ted Ziegenbusch departed the station on January 16, 2020, as a result of mass layoffs nationwide by parent company iHeartMedia; the two had been at KOST since the 1980s, Ziegenbusch being the last remaining original staff member hired in 1982.

In conjunction with an announcement wherein iHeartRadio would add two streaming channels dedicated to his on-going radio program, Rick Dees would make a guest deejaying spot on the station on March 21, 2025, marking a brief reunion between him and his former co-host Ellen K (the duo had previously worked at sister station KIIS-FM during their hosting shifts) during her morning show.

On October 10, 2025, longtime evening host Karen Sharp departed the station after hosting "Love Songs On The Coast" for 38 years; she was the last remaining KOST DJ from the 1980s.

== HD programming ==
KOST broadcasts three digital subchannels:

- KOST-HD1 is a digital version of KOST's analog signal.
- KOST-HD2 is an HD simulcast of the talk radio format heard on co-owned KFI (640 AM).

From November 2013 until February 2015, KOST's HD3 signal relayed the syndicated Christian contemporary hit radio station Air1. In early February, the station's HD3 signal went dark and the Air1 feed moved to a subchannel on co-owned KHHT (92.3 FM). The HD3 signal returned in November 2018, however, it is no longer operating.

== Translators and booster ==
KOST is rebroadcast on the following translator and repeater stations:

Broadcast translators for KOST
| Call sign | Frequency | City of license | FID | ERP (W) | HAAT | Class | FCC info | Notes |
|---|---|---|---|---|---|---|---|---|
| K234CR | 94.7 FM | China Lake, California | 28582 | 9 | 390 m (1,280 ft) | D | LMS | Provides service to nearby Ridgecrest |
| KOST-FM1 | 103.5 FM | Santa Clarita, California | 198146 | 500 | 612 m (2,008 ft) | D | LMS | Booster |
| K280DT | 103.9 FM | Thousand Oaks, California | 14241 | 5 | 215 m (705 ft) | D | LMS | Provides service to Thousand Oaks |

== Awards ==
In 2007, the station was nominated for an "Adult Contemporary Station of The Year" award for the top 25 radio markets by Radio & Records magazine.
