= Animal Radio =

- Animal Radio
- Genre: Pet Talk
- Running time: 2 hours (with commercials)
- Country of origin: United States
- Language: English
- Hosted by: Hal Abrams and Judy Francis
- Starring: Hal Abrams; Judy Francis; Vladae; Dr. Debbie
- Original release: 2002 – Present
- No. of episodes: 467
- Audio format: Stereo
- Website: AnimalRadio.com

Animal Radio is a nationally syndicated radio show, hosted by Hal Abrams and Judy Francis. The show was once based in Utah, but has since moved to California. The show is self-syndicated, under the Animal Radio Network branding, to over 90 stations in the United States. It is also heard on America's Talk on XM Radio. The show's website broadcasts a stream of show content nonstop.

== Broadcast ==
The show's format is pre-recorded, as most of the show consists of guest interviews and contributions, which need to be scheduled to accommodate the guest. Technically, the show does take calls. The show's phone number, +1 (866) 405-8405, is active every day at all hours, and gives instructions to the caller and allows them to leave a message. Show hosts Hal and Judy sit in studio from 10 a.m. to 2 p.m. eastern time on Saturdays, when affiliate show play is the heaviest.

Each show is available to stations in two methods. The first, being the most convenient, is through an FTP system where affiliates pickup MP3s of the show. The second is a live satellite feed which occurs Saturday afternoons from noon to 3 p.m. eastern time. The show runs a traditional syndication clock, with availabilities for news, local and network spots. There are 6 minutes of network spots distributed through the show.

Animal Radio on XM Satellite Radio retains a slightly different broadcast format. First, there are no network breaks in the show. Second, there is approximately 10 extra minutes of content per hour, which is exclusive to XM and show podcasts. America's Talk on XM 158 runs the show Saturdays from noon to 2 p.m. eastern, during the allotted live studio time, and replays it Sundays from 9 to 11 a.m. eastern.

When this airs on KOST the station cuts the show down to 30 minutes due to "The Sunday Journal With Kari Steele" which focuses on organizations within the community broadcasting live at 6:30 every Sunday Morning.

== Contributors ==
- Bobbie Hill - The hostess of a pet news featurette. Hill also does commercial reads for the show.
- Vinnie Penn - Animal Radio's resident "party animal." Penn does a featurette for the show expressing his opinions on pet trends.
- Vladae - The "World Famous" Russian Dog Wizard. Often a third mic on the show, Vladae takes calls from listeners who need help training their dogs.
- Dr. Jim Humphries - The host of a veterinary news featurette.
- Joy Turner - Self-proclaimed animal communicator. Joy takes calls from listeners when she appears on the show.
- Susan Sims - Hosts the Fido Friendly Travel featurette about traveling with dogs.
- Dr. Debbie White - Another frequent third mic on the show, Dr. Debbie takes vet questions from callers.
- Britt Savage - Hostess of the lighter Animal Minute featurette.
- Rae Ann Kumelos - Dr. Rae Ann Kumelos uncovers the stories behind some of the most loved - and most controversial animals.
- Kaye Browne - Hostess of the Animal Radio World News featurette.
