= KCLS (Arizona) =

Radio station in Flagstaff, Arizona, United States (1950–1988)

KCLS was a radio station broadcasting in Flagstaff, Arizona. Charles J. Saunders put it on the air in 1950; the station closed on July 14, 1988, though its license hung around for another decade and was used in a frequency swap to move KVNA.

== History ==
KCLS was the third radio station to be built in Flagstaff, Arizona. The first, KFXY, operated in Flagstaff from December 10, 1925, to 1932. The station was owned and operated by Mary Costigan and operated from the Orpheum Theatre and Monte Vista Hotel. It changed its call letters to KUMA on June 22, 1932, as part of a move to Yuma; the station operated in Yuma until the Federal Communications Commission (FCC) revoked its license on February 1, 1940, because the licensee did not actually operate the station.

The second attempt, KWRZ on 1340 kHz, was owned by the Grand Canyon Broadcasting Company and broadcast between April 4, 1947, and September 30, 1949, when it was shuttered for financial reasons and the unlawful transfer of the station without the approval of the FCC.

While KCLS had been initially slated to debut as a daytime-only station on 1220 kHz, the demise of KWRZ prompted KCLS to apply for the 1340 frequency instead, and the station changed to 1340 before going on the air in August 1950. The station was owned by Saunders Broadcasting and named for Charles's daughter, Cheryl Lynn Saunders. In 1953, KCLS moved to 1360 kHz, quickly followed by a shift to 600 kHz in 1954. On this frequency, the station broadcast with 5,000 watts of power in the daytime and 500 watts directional at night; this made it the most powerful AM radio station in Northern Arizona. The KCLS studios were originally a quonset hut.

Throughout most of its history, KCLS broadcast "middle-of-the-road" or "adult contemporary" music. It was also an early communications link for members of the nearby Navajo tribe, broadcasting in Navajo for one hour a day from 5 to 6 in the morning until the mid-1970s. The station had a long tradition of local news, with several radio announcers moving on to news positions in larger markets and with networks. The station contracted with the National Weather Service to have their meteorologists deliver the weather. KCLS was also well known for broadcasting Northern Arizona University (NAU) sports and also high school sports.

Charles Saunders also owned stations KUPI and KQPI in Idaho Falls, Idaho, at different times in the 1960s, 1970s and 1980s. Saunders, who was known as "C-J the D-J", served as mayor of Flagstaff from 1958 to 1960.

KCLS was sold to Charles T. Goyette and James A. Kurtz in 1986. Shortly after, Goyette exited the partnership. Kurtz opted to have the land rezoned for a mobile home park, citing increased competition for listeners from new FM stations. On July 14, 1988, Kurtz informed general manager Anthony DeFazio that he would shut down KCLS that day. DeFazio would be the final voice heard over the station, delivering one last newscast at 6pm informing of KCLS's closure.

KCLS's folding left a major void in the market, particularly for local sports. KVNA moved to acquire on-air talent, including DeFazio, and sports rights including Los Angeles Dodgers baseball and Flagstaff High School football. NAU sports migrated to KMGN.

While KCLS had gone dark, the license remained active and was ultimately sold to TVNA Limited Partnership, the owners of KVNA. They swapped the frequencies of KVNA and KCLS, with KCLS moving (on paper) to 690 and KVNA relocating from 690 to 600. The KCLS license was canceled in February 1997 for failure to transmit in a 12-month period under Section 312(g) of the Communications Act.

== See also ==
- KVNA (AM)
- FCC History Cards for KCLS
