= Metropolitana FM =

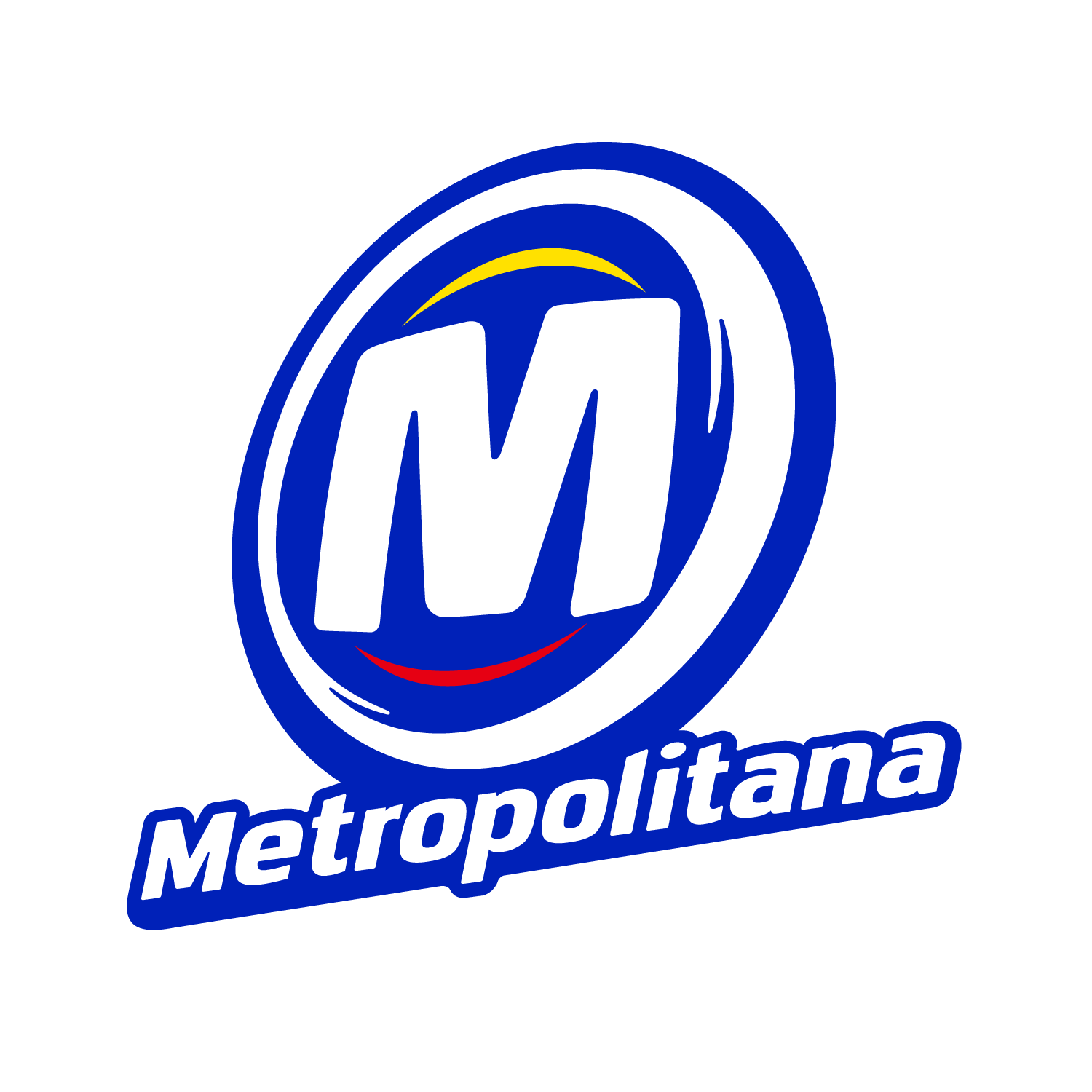
- Country: Brazil
- Headquarters: São Paulo, Brazil

Programming
- Language(s): Portuguese

History
- Launch date: 1982

Links
- Webcast: Listen live
- Website: metropolitana.com.br

Metropolitana FM is a Brazilian radio network headquartered in São Paulo, featuring programming focused on pop music, sertanejo music, and funk. Its main station in the São Paulo metropolitan area broadcasts at 98.5 MHz. The network has branches in Aracaju, Belém, Goiânia, Maceió, Salvador, Foz do Iguaçu, Ribeirão Preto, Tucuruí, and Araguatins.

== History ==
Metropolitana FM was founded by businessman Jayr Mariano Sanzone in 1982 in the city of São Paulo. By that time, he had already established radio stations in Guaratinguetá and Mogi das Cruzes. In 1996, the station shifted its focus to a young audience and began concentrating on pop music. His sons, Jayr Sanzone Júnior and Jácomo Sanzone, revamped the station in 1998, creating new programs.

In 2013, after leaving 89 FM to return to investing in rock music, Wagner Rocha resumed the artistic direction of Metropolitana FM, creating programs to feature funk carioca and funk ostentação. The following year, changes in programming brought Metropolitana FM back into the top 10 most-listened-to radio stations in Greater São Paulo, a position it had not held for many years. In 2015, the station began investing in sertanejo music and other popular Brazilian rhythms, enabling it to lead in audience share among stations targeting a young audience.

In 2023, the station announced its national network project, named Rede Metropolitana Brasil. In 2024, it launched affiliates in Ribeirão Preto, Foz do Iguaçu, and Aracaju, and in 2025, it inaugurated affiliates in Goiânia and Tucuruí.

== Programs ==
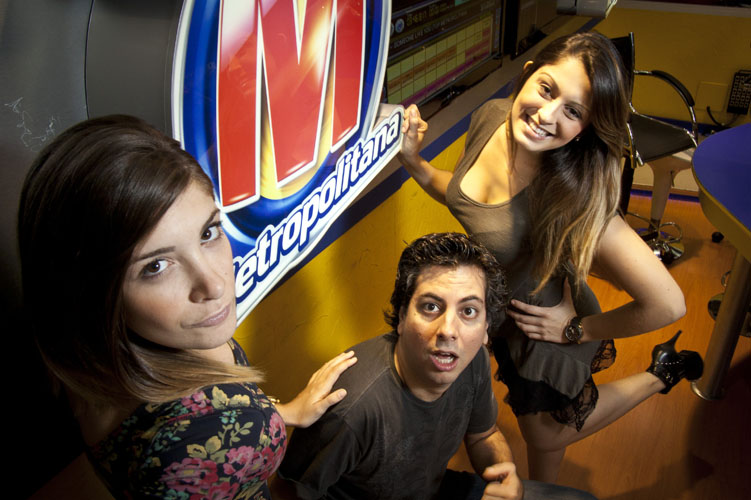
The presenters of Chupim in 2012

The station's highest-rated program is the comedy show Chupim, created in 1996 and currently hosted by Beby (Marcelo Barbur), Barthô (Fernando Xavier), and the singer Biel. The show is known for making live prank phone calls to people who post "bizarre" classified ads. The most impactful prank occurred in 2009, when Barthô gave interviews to radio stations in other countries posing as then-President Lula da Silva. The repercussion of the incident was so significant that it was featured in some international newspapers and forced the Brazilian government to issue a statement on the matter. Through a spokesperson, the presidential office stated that the issue had been referred to the presidency's security bureau.

Another successful program is Cafeína Late Show, a nightly comedy program hosted by Dani Zanetti and Marcelo Batista. The show featured segments such as Rádio Relógio, where Marcelo and Dani would wake up listeners with prank calls, and the segment Necessitados, where, with the help of the listeners themselves, they would assist people in material need.
