= 89 FM A Rádio Rock =

89 FM A Rádio Rock (ZYD906)

Osasco; Brazil
- Broadcast area: São Paulo
- Frequency: 89.1 MHz

Programming
- Language: Portuguese

Ownership
- Owner: Grupo Camargo de Comunicação; (Rede Autonomista de Radiodifusão Ltda)
- Sister stations: Rádio Disney Brasil · TMC

History
- First air date: December 2, 1985

Technical information
- Licensing authority: ANATEL
- Class: E3
- ERP: 109.62 kW
- Transmitter coordinates: 23°34′14″S 46°38′39.01″W

Links
- Public license information: Profile
- Website: www.radiorock.com.br

89 FM A Rádio Rock is a Brazilian radio station based in São Paulo, with a programming focused on rock music. The station broadcasts on 89.1 MHz for listeners in the Metropolitan Region of São Paulo. It is controlled by the Grupo Camargo de Comunicação. According to Kantar IBOPE Media, between late 2023 and early 2024, it was the seventh most listened-to radio station in Greater São Paulo.

The station was founded on December 2, 1985, in a year marked by the end of the military dictatorship and the first edition of Rock in Rio. In 2006, the station abandoned its rock-oriented programming and shifted to pop, but returned to rock in 2012.

== History ==
=== 1985–2006: Founding and first phase ===
89 FM, originally "A Rádio Rock," was launched on December 2, 1985, replacing Pool FM on the 89.1 MHz frequency in São Paulo. From the start, it established itself as a pioneer of commercial rock in Brazil, differentiating itself from both pop stations and more traditional, alternative rock stations (like 97 Rock). It adopted a youthful tone and a repertoire focused on the genre's biggest hits, quickly earning a reputation as a reference point. Initially, it even had a phase with a more alternative and independent profile but solidified its format around hits. During this period, it built a network of affiliate stations in cities like Campinas, Sorocaba, and Santos.

=== 2006: Decline and transition to pop ===
In the early 2000s, the station began losing audience share to other youth-oriented stations. In response, in 2006, the Grupo Camargo de Comunicação promoted a radical overhaul. Under the command of artistic director Waguinho Rocha, the station completely abandoned its rock identity. It changed its name to "89 FM," adopted a pop format that included black music and dance music, and repositioned all its programming and branding. The change, seen as a betrayal by many loyal listeners, sparked protests but led to an increase in ratings, placing it among the top 10 most-listened-to stations in Greater São Paulo.

=== 2006–2012: The pop phase and partnerships ===
During the pop phase, the station invested in aggressive campaigns ("Primeiro na 89" / "First on 89," "Eu sigo a 89" / "I Follow 89") and interactive programming, exploring new media and social networks. However, its affiliate network shrank significantly, with the stations in Sorocaba (2009) and Campinas (2010) going off the air and being taken over by other programming. Between February 2011 and June 2012, the station operated under a naming rights contract with Nestlé, becoming known as "89 FM a Rádio Fast." Despite maintaining the pop format, the partnership was not renewed.

=== 2012: Surprising return to rock ===
In September 2012, news circulated that 89 FM would be sold to a religious group, which would mean its end. Defying expectations, Rádio Rock returned experimentally through a special web broadcast in October 2012. The success of the listeners' immediate and overwhelming response was decisive. Consequently, the Grupo Camargo decided to reverse the sale, bringing rock back to the air. The official reactivation took place on December 21, 2012. The last pop song played was "Your Body" by Christina Aguilera, and the initial return phase featured a brief naming rights partnership with UOL.

=== 2012–present: Consolidation and expansion ===
Since its return, 89 FM A Rádio Rock has re-established itself as the audience leader in the rock segment in the country. The partnership with UOL ended in 2013, but the station maintained its strength. In 2019, it began a new national expansion project, reviving the affiliate network model (e.g., in Goiânia) that broadcasts the same programming as the São Paulo flagship. According to Kantar IBOPE Media (2023/2024), it is the seventh most-listened-to radio station in Greater São Paulo and the second-place station in the competitive youth/alternative segment.
