= The Other Side with Steve Godfrey =

American radio show

The Other Side With Steve Godfrey
- Genre: Talk show
- Running time: 3 hours
- Country of origin: United States
- Home station: KFYI
- Starring: Steve Godfrey
- Original release: Invalid date range
- Website: TheOtherSideWithSteveGodfrey.com

The Other Side With Steve Godfrey was a nationally syndicated radio show aired on a number of radio stations across the United States. The show aired from 9 PM to midnight EST, on Saturday nights. It was hosted by self-professed psychic medium Steve R. Godfrey on flagship station KFYI in Phoenix, Arizona. The show was carried on the WestStar TalkRadio Network.

The radio program consisted of Steve Godfrey allegedly communicating messages from deceased loved ones to on-air callers. Godfrey often discovered details, such as pets, specific cars, specific events or dates, etc. from the departed. However, some callers report to have been pre-screened with detailed questions on the persons they wished to contact. But others claim this did not happen to them.

The commentary had a tendency to lean towards Christian beliefs during the show. In contrast to this, Godfrey additionally had a regular segment called "Intuition Development" where he talked about the Zodiac and lunar cycles. Themes from other religions, including Hinduism, Buddhism and New Age Paganism, were also included in the show. He in addition encouraged listeners to perform "affirmations" and "mantras".

The usual music aired on the show came from the soundtrack of the motion picture Field of Dreams, composed by James Horner.

Godfrey professes a belief in someone beyond our human experience, namely, a God. He doesn't believe in "hell" per se, but does believe in punishment in the form of going to a lower level of existence in the next life. After death, in his view, people go through a process of "purgatory" before entering into a "heaven". Then, after some time has passed, they reincarnate.

June 11, 2011 was the final live show.

The show was re-launched by WestStar on April 15, 2017 in the same timeslot.
