= Transamérica Pop =

Brazilian radio network

Transamérica Pop was a Brazilian radio network owned by Rede Transamérica. The network was directed to a young audience and has programming that highlights the musical genres pop, rock and hip hop.

It was created in 1990 at the start of the satellite transmissions of Transamérica. The Transamérica Pop network expanded to fourteen stations in Brazil (cities: São Paulo, Rio de Janeiro, Salvador, Brasília, Curitiba, Recife, Balneário Camboriú and Montes Claros).

On July 22, 2019, Transamérica confirmed the beginning of the unification of the carriers Transamérica Hits and Transamérica Pop, returning to the way of working before the division into carriers. Transamerica also confirmed that the new music programming would be composed of rock and pop hits (national and international), aiming to reach and attract the public between 25 and 49 years old. On August 5, work on the new Transamerica Network officially began. All broadcasters ceased to use the nomenclature Transamerica Pop definitively.
