= KVRD-FM =

- Cottonwood, Arizona; United States
- Frequency: 105.7 MHz

Programming
- Format: Country
- Affiliations: CNN Radio, Westwood One

Ownership
- Owner: Yavapai Broadcasting Corporation

History
- Former call signs: KURD-FM (1989–1989)

Technical information
- Licensing authority: FCC
- Facility ID: 35865
- Class: C3
- ERP: 300 watts
- HAAT: 779.0 meters (2,555.8 ft)
- Transmitter coordinates: 34°41′11″N 112°6′58″W

Links
- Public license information: Public file; LMS
- Website: kvrdfm.com

KVRD-FM (105.7 FM) is a radio station broadcasting a country music format. It is licensed to Cottonwood, Arizona, United States. Yavapai Broadcasting Corporation currently owns the station and features programming from CNN Radio and Westwood One.

== History ==
The station was assigned the call letters KURD-FM on 1989-10-18. On 1989-11-20, the station changed its call sign to the current KVRD-FM.
