= ABC Watermark =

American radio syndication company

ABC Watermark was a radio syndication entity that existed from 1982 until 1995.

== History ==
The company came to be as the result of ABC Radio Networks' purchase of Watermark Inc. from its founders Tom Rounds and Ron Jacobs. The acquisition gave ABC control of Watermark's two major syndication properties, the Casey Kasem and Don Bustany creations American Top 40 and American Country Countdown. ABC would later launch another show under the American brand, the oldies-themed American Gold, in 1991.

== Current status ==
Watermark ceased to exist after the cancellation of American Top 40 in 1995; it would later be revived by Kasem in 1998 and is currently distributed by Premiere Radio Networks. American Country Countdown has aired continuously since its premiere and continues to be distributed by ABC successor Cumulus Media, now under the Nash FM brand (as of January 2025 it is now hosted by Ryan Fox; longtime host Bob Kingsley hosted the identically formatted Country Top 40) from New Year's weekend 2005/2006 until shortly before his death on Thursday, October 17, 2019. American Gold ended in 2009, with host Dick Bartley now hosting the similarly formatted Classic Countdown for United Stations Radio Networks.
