= Lee Hansen =

American actor

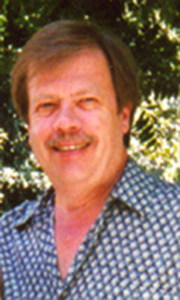
- Hansen in 2001
- Born: Leland Hansen; March 26, 1944 (age 82); Spokane, Washington, U.S.
- Occupations: Radio Personality, Voice Actor, Director, Writer, Producer
- Years active: 1960–present
- Website: www.alienworlds.com

Leland (Lee) Hansen (born March 26, 1944, in Spokane, Washington) is an American radio personality and voice actor best known for creating the popular Alien Worlds radio drama in the late 1970s.

== Background ==
Hansen grew up on a farm in Tekoa, Washington and began his radio career at KCLX while still attending Tekoa High School. After graduation he went to South Vietnam to serve in the Vietnam War, and in 1963 he became a founding member of Armed Forces Radio Saigon (AFRS). The radio network would eventually spread and serve over 500,000 GI's, and Hansen hosted the station's very first morning show in Saigon.

After his discharge, Hansen worked as a disc jockey for major Top 40 radio stations around the country, until he was hired in 1970 by Mel Blanc Audio Media. He served as both their Creative Director and Studio Operations Manager, and a year later he was appointed Director of The Mel Blanc School of Voice and Commercials.

He joined Watermark Studios in 1973. He became studio manager and worked as a producer and co-producer for several syndicated radio shows. Also at Watermark, in 1977 he became best known for creating, producing, and directing the popular dramatic radio series Alien Worlds – On The Threshold of The Unknown. The stories were written by Hansen and Ron Thompson with a variety of other co-writers including Babylon 5 writer J. Michael Straczynski. The science fiction drama was eventually picked up by more than 1500 stations worldwide.

== Later career ==
Alien Worlds ended in 1980 and he went on to UCLA Film School. He later gained prominence with his production company “GDE” as a writer, producer and director for film and TV features centered around the US Space Program and Aerospace Industry. Hansen is currently the CEO of Addlink, LLC, a Hollywood production firm.

== Radio work ==
=== As a DJ ===
- KCLX in Colfax, Washington
- AFRS in Saigon, Vietnam
- WGBA in Columbus, Georgia
- WQXI in Atlanta, Georgia
- KASH in Eugene, Oregon
- KENO/KLUC-FM in Las Vegas, Nevada
- KUTE FM in Los Angeles, California

=== As a producer ===
- American Top 40 with Casey Kasem
- American Country Countdown with Bob Kingsley
- The Robert W. Morgan Special of The Week
- The Elvis Presley Story
- Soundtrack of the '60s with Gary Owens
- Alien Worlds with Linda Gary
- The Rock Files with Keith Austin
