= Country Countdown USA =

- Genre: Music chart show
- Running time: Approx. 3 hours (including commercials)
- Country of origin: United States
- Language: English
- Syndicates: Compass Media Networks
- Hosted by: Lon Helton
- Created by: Gary Landis
- Original release: April 4, 1992 – present
- Audio format: Stereophonic sound
- Website: Official Website

Country Countdown USA is a nationally syndicated weekly country music top-30 chart countdown program hosted by Lon Helton.

== Debut ==
The show premiered on the Mutual Broadcasting System in April 1992. The program began as the brainchild of Westwood One Chairman Norman J. Pattiz who assigned the project to his Programming VP, Gary Landis. Although Westwood One had several country programs mainly broadcast on its co-owned Mutual network, the company didn't have a weekly country countdown show.

At the time, the leader was American Country Countdown with Bob Kingsley (now hosted by Ryan Fox). It was a traditional countdown show modeled after Casey Kasem’s American Top 40. Other shows on the air at the time included Unistar’s Weekly Country Music Countdown with Chris Charles (no longer on the air) and TNN’s Crook & Chase Top 40 (still on the air). The latter two included pre-recorded interview clips with artists, while ACC was strictly a scripted show (although interviews would later be added).

== Format ==
Landis' concept was simple: A DJ and a country star co-host would count down the week’s top 30 and talk about the songs and artists in the chart. When Landis first began looking for talent, numerous DJs were considered, before they decided on Radio & Records' Country Editor, Lon Helton. Landis called Helton directly and offered him the job. The country star was a more difficult decision. No single country star was willing to commit to a 52-week schedule. So the decision was made to have a different country star act as co-host every week. It would be a three-hour show, playing the week’s Top 30. Unlike other syndicated shows at the time, the show featured only three commercial breaks per hour, and a music sweep at the top of the hour, based on the formats of most country radio stations.

Landis then looked for a producer to oversee the program. Mutual Broadcasting System Senior Producer George Achaves quickly jumped at the chance. George had worked with Lon on a short-lived weekly country show called Listen In. He also did Mutual’s holiday country specials with WHN DJ Lee Arnold. Lon’s office manager, Jo Pincek, was tapped to handle artist relations. The show became the first Westwood One show to be delivered exclusively on compact disc.

== History ==
When Country Countdown USA began on April 4, 1992, the show had about 75 affiliates, including WYNY-FM New York and KLAC Los Angeles. The first co-host was Steve Wariner, who was enjoying his first hit on the Arista Records label, “The Tips of My Fingers.” The song ultimately went to #1. Other co-hosts during the shows first year included Reba McEntire, Trisha Yearwood, and Brooks & Dunn. The show's unique live sound and funny conversation quickly made it a favorite with the “hot new country” stations that were becoming popular. It wasn't long before the show became one of the biggest country shows in the US, and one of the most popular syndicated shows in Westwood One's line-up.

When Amber Radio launched in the east of England in September 1995, it included the show in its line-up, country having long been popular in the region. It was also taken by Century Radio in north-east England.

On July 20, 2022, it was reported that Compass Media Networks would begin distributing Country Countdown USA on August 1.

== Features ==
Regular features in the show include The Week's Hottest Song, which was originally based on a feature in Radio & Records. The newspaper eliminated the feature in the late 90s, but it was kept in the radio show, basing it on the song in the Top 5 with the most increased points. During the early years, the show also featured disc jockeys from the show's affiliates talking about upcoming concert attractions in their area before introducing a hot-breaking song at their station (always a song that had yet to reach the top 30).

One popular new element in recent years has been taking tape clips of previous co-hosts talking about artists in the chart, and playing them for those artists. This allowed listeners to get unique insights into their favorite stars.

The last two weeks of December feature CCUSA's annual year-end countdown. A "Top 70 program" split in two parts (songs 36–70 in Week 1, the top 35 in the following show), Helton features interview highlights from the past year, plus a "live" interview with the artist having the No. 1 song of the year. Stations can play each three-hour program separately, while many often will play both parts—as a six-hour program—during at least one of the two weekends.

== Success ==
The success of Country Countdown USA and the continued boom in country music led to the creation of several other regular country shows at Westwood One. At the time, the company did a new release show for pop radio hosted by Joel Denver called Future Hits. So, Norm Pattiz asked his staff to create a Country Future Hits. The show, also produced by CCUSA producer George Achaves, was named Country's Cutting Edge, and it debuted in 1993. The first host was Brad Chambers, program director of the influential Dallas station KPLX. That same year, Lon Helton suggested to Norm that some highlights from CCUSA could be turned into a daily 90-second show. That show was named Country's Inside Trak, and was launched as a companion to the weekly show.

Over the years, Lon Helton hosted numerous country specials for Westwood One. Country Takes Manhattan was a week-long live concert series broadcast live from venues in New York. The Country Freedom Concert was a live simulcast of the CMT concert special which raised funds for victims of 9–11.

In 2002 the show was renamed CMT's Country Countdown USA, as part of the newly launched collaboration with CMT. When Radio & Records was merged into Billboard in 2006, CMT's Country Countdown USA continued using the Mediabase 24/7 chart, which is also used by Bob Kingsley's Country Top 40. Concurrently, in August 2006 Helton exited Radio & Records to launch his own Country trade publication, Country Aircheck.

== Awards ==
CCUSA host Lon Helton was named the National Air Personality of the Year by the Country Music Association in 2002 and 2004, 2006, 2008, 2010, 2012, 2014, 2016, 2018, 2020, and 2021. He won the same award from the Academy of Country Music in 2009, 2012, 2014, 2016, and 2018. In 2006, Helton was inducted into the Country DJ Hall of Fame in Nashville, Tennessee. Helton was inducted into the Country Radio Hall of Fame in 2006, Radio Hall of Fame in 2022 and in 2026 he was awarded the Country Radio Broadcasters President's Award.
