= American Top 40 =

Radio countdown series

- American Top 40 logo 2021–present.
- Other names: AT40
- Genre: Music chart show, talk
- Running time: 4 hrs. (including commercials); 3 hrs. + 15 min. (w/out commercials)
- Country of origin: United States
- Language: English
- Home station: KIIS-FM (Los Angeles); WHTZ (New York City)
- Syndicates: Premiere Networks, Radio Express
- Hosted by: Ryan Seacrest (2004–present); Casey Kasem (1970–1988, 1998–2004); Shadoe Stevens (1988–1995); See also § Substitute hosts and guest co-hosts
- Announcer: Miles Hlivko
- Created by: Casey Kasem, Don Bustany, Tom Rounds and Ron Jacobs
- Produced by: Easton Allyn & Jennifer Sawalha (Present); Nikki Wine (1970s); Don Bustany (1970s, 1979–1987); Lorre Crimi (1998–2004)
- Original release: July 4, 1970 – present (hiatus January 28, 1995 – March 28, 1998)
- Website: americantop40.com

American Top 40 (abbreviated to AT40) is an internationally syndicated, independent song countdown radio program created by Casey Kasem, Don Bustany, Tom Rounds, and Ron Jacobs. The program is currently hosted by Ryan Seacrest and presented as an adjunct to his weekday radio program, On Air with Ryan Seacrest.

Originally a production of Watermark Inc. (later a division of ABC Radio known as ABC Watermark, now Cumulus Media Networks which merged with Westwood One), American Top 40 is now distributed by Premiere Networks (a division of iHeartMedia). Nearly 500 radio stations in the United States, the American Forces Network, and multiple other stations worldwide air American Top 40, and the show streams through several venues, including iHeartMedia's own iHeartRadio app.

Co-creator Kasem hosted the original American Top 40 from its inauguration on July 4, 1970, until August 6, 1988. Shadoe Stevens took over the program on August 13, 1988, and hosted until January 28, 1995, when the original program came to an end. Three years later, Kasem teamed up with Premiere's predecessor AMFM Radio Networks to relaunch American Top 40. Kasem, who had spent nine years hosting his own countdown Casey's Top 40 for Westwood One, returned to hosting his creation on March 28, 1998. Seacrest took over American Top 40 on January 10, 2004, following Kasem's retirement from the series.

Currently, American Top 40 with Seacrest airs in two formats, with one distributed to Contemporary Hit Radio (Top 40) stations and the other to Hot Adult Contemporary stations. However, there is no distinction made between the two shows on air. There are also two classic editions of the original American Top 40 distributed every weekend, featuring past Kasem-hosted shows from the 1970s and 1980s.

In its early years, American Top 40 used the Billboard charts to compile the countdown, touting it as "the only source". The program subsequently switched to being based on Radio and Records airplay data upon its late 1990s return, until R&R was folded into Billboard in 2009. The current source for the American Top 40 charts are unpublished mainstream Top 40 and hot adult contemporary charts compiled by Mediabase (who had been the chart data supplier for Radio & Records).

== History ==
=== 1970–1988: First Casey Kasem era ===
Here we go with the Top 40 hits of the nation this week on American Top 40, the best-selling and most-played songs from the Atlantic to the Pacific, from Canada to Mexico. This is Casey Kasem in Hollywood, and in the next three hours, we'll count down the 40 most popular hits in the United States this week, hot off the record charts of Billboard magazine for the week ending July 11, 1970. In this hour at No. 32 in the countdown, a song that's been a hit 4 different times in 19 years! And we're just one tune away from the singer with the $10,000 gold hubcaps on his car! Now, on with the countdown!

— Casey Kasem at the beginning of the inaugural AT40 broadcast

American Top 40 began on the Independence Day weekend in 1970, on seven radio stations, the first being KDEO in El Cajon, California (now KECR), which broadcast the inaugural show the evening of July 3, 1970. Billboard reported prior to the release of the show that it had been sold to stations in 10 radio markets. Kasem was reportedly inspired by Make Believe Ballroom, a radio show that was nationally syndicated in the 1940s and popularized the concept of a disc jockey playing current popular recorded music on the air.

The chart data broadcast for the premiere show actually included the top 40 songs from the week ending July 11, 1970. The first show featured the last time both Elvis Presley and the Beatles had songs simultaneously in the Top 10. It was originally distributed by Watermark Inc., and was first presented in mono until February 24, 1973, when the first stereo vinyl copies were distributed. In early 1982, Watermark was purchased by ABC Radio and AT40 became a program of the "ABC Contemporary Radio Network". The program was hosted by Kasem and co-created by Kasem; Don Bustany, Kasem's childhood friend from Detroit, Michigan; radio veteran Tom Rounds; and 93/KHJ Program Director Ron Jacobs, who produced and directed the various production elements. Rounds was also the marketing director; the initial funder was California strawberry grower Tom Driscoll.

The show began as a three-hour program written and directed by Bustany, counting down the top 40 songs on Billboard's Hot 100 Singles chart. The show quickly gained popularity once it was commissioned, and expanded to a four-hour-program on October 7, 1978, to reflect the increasing average length of singles on Billboard's Hot 100 chart. The producing staff expanded to eight people: Nikki Wine, Ben Marichal, Scott Paton, Matt Wilson, Merrill Shindler, Guy Aoki, Ronnie Allen, and Sandy Stert Benjamin. (Bustany retired from AT40 in 1989; beginning in 1994, he hosted a political talk show on listener-sponsored KPFK.) By the early 1980s, the show could be heard on 520 stations in the United States. American Top 40 achieved its zenith around 1984, when the show was broadcast on 1,100-plus stations in over 50 countries. This number included approximately 650 domestic and international commercial stations and 450 outlets of the Armed Forces Radio Network. In the 1980s, it aired in the United Kingdom on Signal Radio, DevonAir, Radio 210, County Sound, Chiltern Radio, Northants 96, Radio Tees, Saxon Radio and Fox FM and was also transmitted on Manx Radio. Kasem told the New York Times in 1990 "I accentuate the positive and eliminate the negative. That is the timeless thing."

==== Features of the Kasem-era shows ====
During Kasem's run as host, AT40 had a number of popular and distinguishing features, some of which Kasem had done for some time at such stations as KRLA in Los Angeles:

- Number jingles: Occasionally, a song was preceded by a brief audio clip of a group of singers announcing the song's position on the chart (e.g. "Number 40!"). This was especially common for the first song played in each hour of the show and often for the first song after a commercial break, but was usually not done for the number-one song (which was usually introduced with a drum roll), or for songs preceded by a story. The "number" jingles were updated and re-recorded from time to time, and by the mid-1980s, the show began using two sets of "number" jingles: the standard set, to be used with up-tempo songs; and a softer alternative set, usually used with low-key or romantic songs.
- Long Distance Dedication: This feature evolved from a spoken-word 45 single that Kasem had recorded in 1964, "Letter from Elaina", in which a girl wrote to Kasem about her encounter with the Beatles.

In a 2007 Valentine's Day special edition of American Top 10 (and explained earlier in Rob Durkee's book American Top 40: The Countdown of the Century), Kasem explained that the LDD feature was intended to be part of the show from the beginning. He knew, however, that it was going to take some time before a listener wrote in with a request and let the process proceed organically. Kasem's patience proved correct, as staffer Matt Wilson found such a letter while checking the show's mail in August 1978. The listener asked Kasem to play the song "Desiree" by Neil Diamond, which he dedicated to his girlfriend of the same name who was moving to West Germany to live with her family on an Army base. The request was fulfilled on the weekend of August 26, 1978; when that show was rebroadcast the weekend of August 25–26, 2007, Kasem recorded two optional segments (played at the discretion of the station) in which he did phone interviews with the man and his former girlfriend about the LDD. Most shows featured two long distance dedications, usually with one during each half of the show. (Sometimes, a song currently in the countdown was requested as a LDD; in such cases, Kasem would typically read the dedication first, and sometimes not even announce the song's chart status until after the song was played.) This feature endured on AT40 into Shadoe Stevens' run as host of the show, from 1988 to 1995, and also followed Kasem on his Westwood One shows, first as "Request and Dedication", and then back to LDD when he returned to AT40 in 1998. Long Distance Dedications were dropped after Ryan Seacrest became host in 2004, but they continued as part of Kasem's adult contemporary countdowns.

- Great Radio Stations: Once an hour, generally halfway into the hour, Kasem relayed three or four radio stations that carried AT40, beginning each list with "American Top 40 is heard in the fifty states and around the world every week on great radio stations like ... ". In the first few years of the program, Kasem said "coast to coast" instead of "in the fifty states." One foreign AT40 affiliate, or mention of Armed Forces Radio, was often included, usually as the last station in the list. In addition, new AT40 affiliates were mentioned at the top of one of the hours (never the first hour). The multiple station mentions became a regular feature in 1972; prior to then, only one station was mentioned per hour. The first station mentioned on AT40 was KMEN (now KKDD) in San Bernardino, California, on the August 29, 1970 show.
- Sign-off: After the number-one song was played, the bumper music began playing, and over that, Kasem typically reported that week's chart date and read the end credits, then signed off with what became his, and the show's, unofficial motto: "Keep your feet on the ground, and keep reaching for the stars." Beginning with the show of June 25, 1977, he usually added "and keep your radio tuned right where it is", as a way to help its affiliated stations improve listener loyalty; this phrase would be retired in 1984, but returned to the show when the AT40 brand name was revived in the late 1990s (Kasem had also used it on Casey's Top 40 and its Adult Contemporary-format spinoffs). Guest hosts would be prohibited from using Kasem's sign-off, but still used the "keep your radio tuned right where it is" phrase when its usage was in effect. Even his sign-on and sign-off music became popular, as "Shuckatoom" (composed by James R. Kirk) became a highly requested song, although it was never used apart from the show; "Shuckatoom" was first used to close AT40 with the "Top 40 Rock & Roll Acts of the 1950s" on October 4, 1975, and first used to open AT40 on November 8, 1975.
- AT40 Archives: In the late 1970s and early 1980s, Kasem began a review of each number-one single of the 1970s played in chronological order at the rate of three per week spaced throughout the broadcast. When completed, he began a similar review of each number-one single of the 1960s.

=== 1988–1995: Shadoe Stevens era ===
In 1988, Kasem left the show over contract concerns with ABC and signed with Westwood One to host a competing weekly countdown. Industry trade paper Billboard magazine reported that the main disputes between Kasem and Watermark/ABC were over his salary (which Westwood One tripled upon his signing), because of declining ratings and a smaller group of stations airing the show. Kasem's final AT40 show, the 940th in the series, aired on August 6, 1988. Kasem was replaced by Shadoe Stevens, whose first American Top 40 show aired on August 13, 1988, on 1,014 stations.

Later, Stevens and AT40 lost a significant number of affiliates when, on January 21, 1989, Kasem's Westwood One show launched. The program, titled Casey's Top 40, used the weekly chart survey published by Radio & Records ("R&R", which is based on radio airplay) instead of the Billboard Hot 100 chart AT40 was still using (which at the time was based on record sales). Further complications arose when some stations that stayed with Stevens also added Kasem's new show.

In an attempt to win back an audience, AT40 tried new features, including interview clips, music news, top 5 flashbacks, and previews of upcoming chart hits (called the "AT40 Sneek Peek"). It also stopped using the Hot 100 chart, switching first to the Hot 100 Airplay chart and finally to the Mainstream Top 40 chart. Later still, the countdown would use what was called a "No Nuttin'" gimmick that drew criticism; at various points of the show, a song would start immediately after the jingle for its position on the chart was played and Stevens would not offer any commentary until it concluded.

ABC kept American Top 40 in its syndication lineup despite the continued lack of improvement in ratings, but in 1994 the network finally decided to cut its losses. ABC announced that after the July 9, 1994 edition of the program, it would be dropping AT40 from its lineup and replacing it with Rick Dees Weekly Top 40. The move resulted in AT40 completely disappearing from United States radio, as no network picked it up for distribution domestically. Despite this, AT40 did not end production. Radio Express, the show's international distributor, kept the program alive for the overseas markets that had not dropped the series after ABC's cancellation.

On the weekend of January 28, 1995, the final episode of the original AT40 was broadcast.

=== 1998–2004: American Top 40 returns; second Casey Kasem era ===
Two years later, in 1997, two separate and coincidental series of events would lead not only to the revival of American Top 40, but would also see the return of Kasem to host it.

When Kasem left ABC Radio in 1988, the branding still belonged to him and show co-creator Don Bustany through their joint production company. In order to continue using the name after Kasem's contract with ABC Watermark expired, ABC would pay Kasem and Bustany a licensing fee. If at any point in the future AT40 was to be cancelled, ABC would be required to attempt to use the branding in some form within a set period of time; if they did not, the network would lose the opportunity to continue licensing the brand and control of it would revert to Kasem and Bustany.

Bustany, however, decided to resign from the countdown shortly after Shadoe Stevens took over as the host. He would have no further involvement in production afterward. The agreement remained in force, though, and ABC eventually would be forced to return the branding rights in 1997 without making any sort of attempt to use them after the original AT40 concluded in 1995; this resulted in Kasem acquiring sole control of the brand.

Meanwhile, Kasem's contract at Westwood One was due for renewal and the relationship between the two sides was becoming contentious. After Kasem's initial contract expired in 1993, Westwood One renewed it for four more years. Kasem had launched an adult contemporary countdown in 1992 as a companion to Casey's Top 40 called Casey's Countdown, and in 1994 he added a third countdown for hot adult contemporary stations titled Casey's Hot 20.

Things were not all positive, though. Westwood One had been acquired by Infinity Broadcasting Corporation in 1993, which put Kasem in the same fold as radio personalities such as Howard Stern. Then, in 1996, Infinity Broadcasting was purchased by CBS. Kasem grew frustrated that no effort had been made to cross promote his shows over CBS’ airwaves, and had also complained that he was not given as much promotion as he initially had been getting when he joined up with Westwood One in 1989, especially now that he was hosting three weekly programs for the network instead of one. Westwood One, meanwhile, did not feel that Casey's Top 40 was producing as much advertising revenue as it had been when Kasem's contract was up for renewal four years earlier; the program did not have as many affiliates by 1997 as it had in 1993, and the two largest media markets (New York and Los Angeles) had dropped the program several years earlier. Another sticking point between the two sides, other than Kasem's salary demands, was that Westwood One was not willing to let Kasem change the name of Casey's Top 40 to American Top 40.

The sides eventually put aside their differences, with Westwood One deciding that losing Kasem to a competitor was not worth their trouble and Kasem signed on for one more year in December 1997. However, after the February 21, 1998, edition of his weekend countdowns, Kasem disappeared from the airwaves without notice and, unbeknownst to Westwood One, with no intention of returning to work.

Chancellor Media, the media company founded by Roy Masters, and Kasem began negotiations to relaunch AT40 for its newly launched syndication service called AMFM Radio Networks. A deal was finalized shortly after Kasem's abrupt departure from Westwood One in which Chancellor would become owners of the AT40 franchise and Kasem would return as host. Westwood One filed a breach of contract lawsuit against Kasem.

The revival of AT40 premiered the weekend of March 28, 1998, one week after Westwood One finally cancelled the three countdowns Kasem was hosting for them after four weeks without him. Chancellor also brought Kasem's AC countdowns to their network, with both now being branded as American Top 20 (see Spin-off programming below). Masters sold Chancellor/AMFM to Clear Channel Communications (the predecessor of what is now iHeartMedia) in 1999, at which point AT40 and other syndicated shows from AMFM Radio Networks were transferred into Premiere Radio Network.

The resurrected American Top 40 kept the Radio and Records CHR/Pop chart previously used for Casey's Top 40 and was used as the basis for the show for the majority of this period.

In December 2003, as part of a new deal with Premiere Radio Networks, Kasem announced that he would retire from hosting American Top 40 so he could focus on his duties hosting the Hot AC and AC versions of the show, American Top 20. He also announced that the new host of AT40 would be Ryan Seacrest, an afternoon DJ host from KYSR who was rapidly gaining stardom from his hosting of the successful music reality TV show American Idol.

Kasem's last show as host of AT40 aired on the weekend of January 3/4, 2004. His final No. 1 was Outkast's "Hey Ya!", which hit the top of the chart on the weekend of December 13, 2003.

=== Since 2004: Ryan Seacrest era ===
The first Ryan Seacrest era logo used from 2004 to 2014.

On January 10, 2004, American Idol host Ryan Seacrest took over the hosting duties of American Top 40 from Kasem, although Kasem would continue to host American Top 20 and American Top 10 until his retirement in July 2009. With the host change, AT40 underwent a makeover, using a new theme song and introducing several new features.

The show also began using a new chart that used no recurrent rule. On the first show with Ryan Seacrest, this led to several older songs reappearing after dropping off many weeks earlier. Over the long term, it meant songs could spend long runs for about a year on the chart even after they went to recurrent status on other published charts. "Here Without You" by 3 Doors Down set a longevity record in 2004 for the CHR show by lasting 50 weeks before finally falling off. In 2006, "Scars" by Papa Roach would go on to tie the record. In 2011, Taio Cruz set AT40's all time longevity record with his song "Dynamite". This hit remained on the chart for 72 weeks, from July 2010 to November 2011. The record has since been broken by Rema & Selena Gomez‘s song “Calm Down”, which remained on the chart for 75 weeks, from November 2022 to April 2024, and Hozier's "Too Sweet", which remained on the chart for 112 weeks, from May 2024 to June 2026. On the Hot AC version of AT40, "Use Somebody" by Kings of Leon set the all-time record in 2011 at 117 consecutive weeks. The record has since been broken by Teddy Swims' song “Lose Control”, which remained on the chart for 131+ weeks, from September 2023 to March 2026. American Top 40 also became more interactive, involving online song voting and e-mail. In December 2006, the series' website was revamped, and the online song voting was discontinued in favor of publishing the Hot AC chart. The website also includes a toll-free number where fans can make requests and "shoutouts", as they would to a local radio station, and by 2009 replayed clips of shoutouts became part of the show. Online song voting was later reinstated, with results of votes on American Top 40's website factored into the chart rankings. AT40 was also expanded to social media through Twitter and Facebook where listeners from around the world will request a song to be included in the AT40 Extra segment, as well as their own mobile application which is available for free download on the Apple AppStore for iOS devices and on Google Play for Android devices.

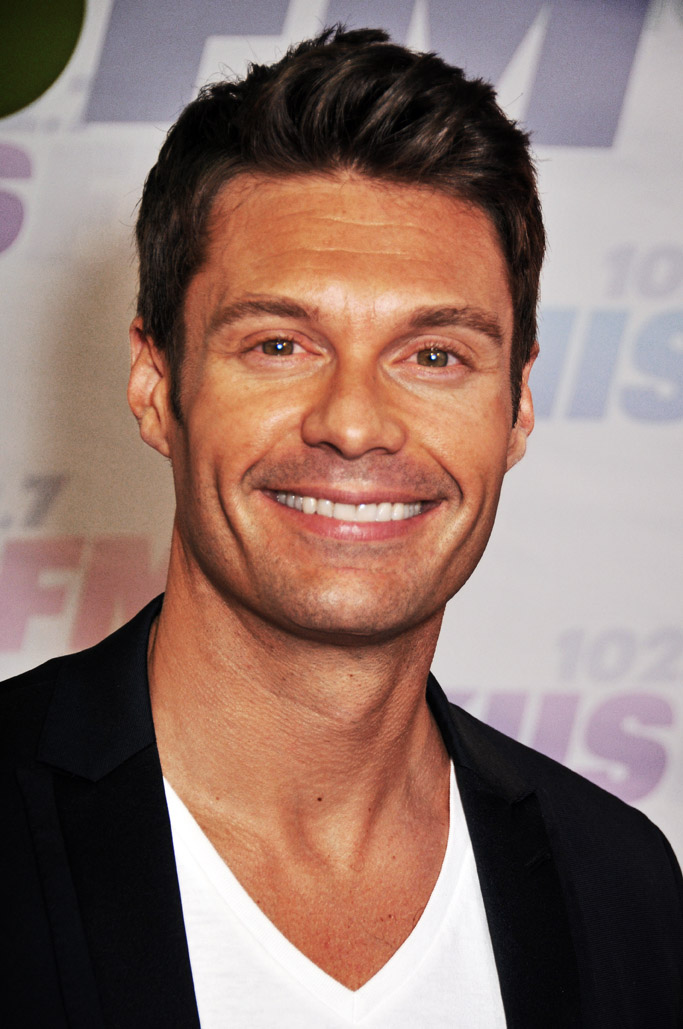
Seacrest in 2013.

In March 2010, Premiere Radio Networks announced that "American Top 5," a condensed daily top-5 countdown, would begin airing as part of the daily radio program On Air, also hosted by Seacrest.

In March 2020, amid the COVID-19 pandemic, Seacrest started to host AT40 from his house; the show also included pre-recorded messages from artists thanking healthcare workers and encouraging listeners to stay home, practice social distancing, and to keep in touch with loved ones. In August 2020, the show rebranded their logo for the 50th anniversary. It features lines similar to those on the edges of vinyl records. It was changed again in September 2021; the same month, Premiere announced the show had been renewed through 2025 with Seacrest as host.

As of 2020, American Top 40 is produced by Easton Allyn and Jennifer Sawalha, and engineered by James Rash.

== Competition ==
American Top 40 has faced numerous competitors since its debut in 1970. These include The Weekly Top 30 with Mark Elliott (1979–1982); several Dick Clark-hosted shows starting in 1981 with the National Music Survey and Countdown America, the latter of which was originally hosted by former R&R CHR editor John Leader and later by Clark; Rockin' America Top 30 Countdown with then Z100 Program Director and personality Scott Shannon; and the Rick Dees Weekly Top 40, which has run continuously since 1983 with Rick Dees as host. Numerous other shows following the same format, both in the general top-40 category and in various specific radio formats, have aired over the course of AT40's history as well. In addition to Dees' show, Mario Lopez, Carson Daly, and (in overseas via World Chart Show) Mike Savage, all host competing countdown shows targeted at the pop top 40 market.

== Rebroadcast of older shows ==
=== Preservation ===
For the first two decades of American Top 40, radio stations would typically be mailed 3 or 4 vinyl LPs of that week’s countdown show, with each disk containing one hour of the show. The LPs were often discarded shortly after the relevant week had passed. The exception to this were the year-end annual countdown specials, which executive producer Tom Rounds suggested affiliates hold onto after their initial broadcast to be used as emergency programming filler.

Beginning in the late 1990s, Shannon Lynn, a fan of the show, began collecting original American Top 40 LPs and digitizing them for personal use. Lynn networked with former AT40 staff members to collect additional LPs and open-reel master tapes, and by 2006 he had digitally remastered a substantial number of shows. As of 2020, Lynn’s company Charis Music Group has a copy of every original broadcast of American Top 40 from 1970 to 2020, in addition to other radio show collections.

In 2026, radio historian Pete Battistini donated part of his collection of American Top 40 related material to Wayne State University, the alma mater of Casey Kasem and Don Bustany. The collection includes script cards, correspondence to and from Bustany, and other historical materials. Battistini had previously authored two books about the 1970s and 1980s eras of American Top 40.

=== AT40 flashback ===
From December 2000 to December 2002, many radio stations aired reruns of 1980–88 episodes under the title American Top 40 Flashback. The show was syndicated by Premiere Radio Networks. In its early weeks the shows were the original four-hour format of an American Top 40 episode, but after the first month and a half the show was reduced to three hours. Although the national syndication of American Top 40 Flashback ceased in December 2002, radio station WMMX in Dayton, Ohio, continued to carry American Top 40 Flashback on Saturday mornings until the premiere of Casey Kasem's 'American Top 40: The 80s.

=== Casey Kasem's American Top 40: The 1970s and 1980s ===
In 2006, Premiere Networks entered into an agreement with XM Satellite Radio to broadcast replays of the 1970s and 1980s Kasem-era American Top 40 shows, but found that their archives only contained some of the master tapes and no hard copies. Rob Durkee connected Premiere Networks with Shannon Lynn, who after a conversation with Kasem, agreed to provide his copies of American Top 40 to Premiere for broadcast on satellite radio.

On August 4, 2006, XM Satellite Radio began replays of the original 1970s and 1980s AT40 shows with Kasem using Lynn's digital remasters with some modifications. The event began with a weekend long marathon of original shows, with AT40 then being added as a regular show on two of XM's Decades channels, "The 70s on 7" and "The 80s on 8". With the merger of Sirius Satellite Radio and XM Satellite Radio, these AT40 shows began airing on both services on November 15, 2008. On the 70s on 7, it replaced the 'Satellite Survey', a Top 30 countdown of 1970s hits, produced by Sirius and hosted by Dave Hoeffel. On the 80s on 8, it replaced 'The Big 40' countdown produced by Sirius and hosted by Nina Blackwood. As of October 11, 2009, Sirius XM replaced the AT40 countdown on 80s on 8 and debuted a revised version of 'The Big 40' countdown now co-hosted by three of the five original MTV VJs: Nina Blackwood, Mark Goodman and Alan Hunter (Martha Quinn was a fourth co-host from 2009 to 2015).

Sirius XM "70s on 7" currently runs AT40 each Saturday beginning at 12 noon, with encore broadcasts the following Sunday at 9 am and at 12 midnight (Eastern Time). Most show dates roughly correspond to the current week in real time. A random episode is also featured on J.J. Walker's show on "70s on 7" Thursdays at 9 pm ET. The mix of AT40 episodes being run on XM include the year-end countdowns, which are typically run in two parts: the first half (Nos. 100 through 51) in one time slot, and then the second half (Nos. 50 through 1) in the following time slot. The AT40 specials are also part of XM's rotation; for instance, "AT40 Goes to the Movies" aired prior to the 2007 Academy Awards, and on February 24, "The Top 40 Acts of the 80s So Far" aired on XM 80s the first week of July 2007. Also, "The Top 40 Songs of the Disco Era (1974–1979)" aired on Sirius XM "70s on 7" the second weekend of July 2011. As of the weekend of February 11, 2023, the 6am and noon Saturday editions were discontinued and replaced by a single 9 am Saturday airing, with the Sunday airing moved to noon Eastern time.

From October through early November 2006, oldies radio station KQQL in Minneapolis/St. Paul, which is owned by iHeartMedia, ran a series of American Top 40 episodes from the 1970s. Aside from one week, when the station attempted to air a four-hour episode from 1979 in the three-hour time slot (resulting in the show getting cut off at No. 11 and the top 10 not being heard), this test run was largely successful. Because of the success, Premiere Radio Networks decided to launch "Casey Kasem's American Top 40: The 1970s" into national syndication featuring the three-hour shows from 1970 to 1978, and the last three hours of shows originally aired from October 1978 through December 1979. (One original four-hour program, first aired in October 1978, was edited into a three-hour program for re-airing in 2007, and the four-hour "Disco Hits" special from July 1979 with the first hour optional was aired in 2008, but until the fall of 2010, no other program from the last 15 months of the 1970s was included in the "AT40: The 70s" package. Starting in late 2010, Premiere began airing three-hour versions of four-hour AT40s from 1978 to 1979, beginning the broadcasts at the start of the countdown's second hour; during the spring of 2012, Premiere began making the first hour of these programs "optional," meaning that stations can choose to air all four hours of the four-hour programs, or just the last three.) Starting in 2012, whenever programs from 1970 to 1972 were scheduled to air, Premiere began offering affiliates the option of airing a later 1970s program instead (typically, a corresponding year from seven years later, or 1977–1979).

The 1980s shows premiered on April 8, 2007, replacing the American Top 40 Flashback reruns. The shows are available in either their full original four-hour format, or an abbreviated three-hour version that omits the first hour of the show. To date, the latest program to air as part of the "AT40: The 80s" package has been August 6, 1988 – Kasem's last show with the original program. Because the rights to Shadoe Stevens-era episodes were held by Cumulus Media, no programs from August 13, 1988, to 1995 have been re-aired as part of this or any similar block.

Newly produced extra segments hosted by voiceover talent Larry Morgan are available for use at stations' discretion. Prior to Kasem leaving Premiere Radio, these segments were hosted by his son Mike; when the series first began, these segments were hosted by one of Kasem's former guest hosts, Ed McMann. These extra segments are also heard on the 80s show. KQQL was the first to sign on, airing programs beginning on December 30, 2006. Typically, the "optional extras" were songs that had yet to enter the top 40 of the Hot 100. However, some songs never reached the top 40 but had since become popular at classic hits/oldies/classic rock stations or certain novelty songs that were popularized by certain media events like the Who shot J.R.? cliffhanger (recorded by Gary Burbank) and the Chicago Bears 1985–86 NFC win and the team itself recording a rap tune about going to the Super Bowl, while others were tributes to performers who had just died. For early 1970s programs, some of the "optional extras" were actually extras (i.e., "oldies") that were originally a part of the original program; in this case, Kasem's original commentary and introduction of the song were kept intact, in lieu of Morgan's voiceover.

In March 2008, XM Satellite Radio rebranded the XM broadcasts with the "Casey Kasem's American Top 40" name and logo used for terrestrial broadcasts, although XM still aired the commercial-free broadcasts, while Premiere Radio carried edited and recut broadcasts with commercials.

=== American Top 40 with Casey Kasem: 90s and 2000s ===
While Premiere Radio did not officially re-air programs other than the aforementioned 70s and 80s charts, most radio stations would re-air the 1998-2003 Casey Kasem-hosted charts, often with the original commercials intact alongside local commercials. Since 2024, a channel airing the 1999-2003 charts, without any commercials, became available on iHeartRadio under the name American Top 40 with Casey Kasem: 90s and 2000s, while using the 1984-88 logo.

== Chart data used by American Top 40 ==
=== Billboard magazine ===
AT40 used the top 40 songs from the Billboard Hot 100 singles chart from the show's inception in 1970 to November 23, 1991. The chart was widely regarded as the industry standard for tracking the popularity of singles, and was thus a natural choice to be used. Kasem would frequently announce during the show that Billboard was the only source for the countdown. While using these charts worked well for the first half of the 1970s, as music changed during the decade and disco became popular on the charts, some rock stations began to drop the show because of complaints from program directors that AT40 was playing too many songs not normally heard on their stations.

This gradually became a wide schism as rock splintered into several formats in the early 1980s. As a result, AT40's weekly playlist could be very diverse in the styles and formats of the songs played. Historians have noted that no one station actually played all of the songs on the Billboard Hot 100 list, because they represented overlapping formats, such as hard rock, mainstream rock, heavy metal, dance, new wave, punk, rap, pop, easy listening/adult contemporary and country. Stations tended to specialize in only one or two of these formats and completely ignore the others.

In November 1991, American Top 40 switched to the Hot 100 Airplay chart (then known as the Top 40 Radio Monitor). These songs generally scored much higher radio airplay, and some were not even released as singles (such as "Steel Bars" by Michael Bolton). During this time, a few songs made very high debuts, including two that almost debuted in the No. 1 spot: "I'll Be There" by Mariah Carey, which entered at No. 4, and "Erotica" by Madonna, which entered at No. 2.

In January 1993, American Top 40 switched charts again, this time to the Billboard Top 40 Mainstream chart. This chart had more mainstream hits but fewer urban, dance and rap songs.

AT40 did not always use the official year-end Billboard chart during the 25 years in which the show used Billboard charts. In 1972, 1973 and 1977, as well as 1980–1984 and 1990–1994, AT40 compiled its own year-end chart. These charts were often close to Billboard's, but AT40 would use a mid-December to early-December time period while Billboard's survey year varied from year to year. AT40 matched Billboard's No. 1 year-end song every year except 1977, 1984, 1990 and 1993.

=== Radio and Records magazine ===
With the show's revival in 1998, a new chart was implemented, the top 40 portion of Radio and Records CHR/Pop top 50 chart, which was already in use on Casey's Top 40. This chart used a recurrent rule that removed songs below No. 25 that had exceeded 26 weeks in the top 50; these removals, if they occurred in the top 40, would be reflected on the appropriate week's program. In 1999, the rule was modified to further restrict long chart runs: songs falling below No. 20 with at least 20 weeks in the top 50 would now be removed.

On October 21, 2000, American Top 40 began using an unpublished chart on a weekly basis for the first time in its history. The chart seemed to be a variant of the CHR/Pop chart provided by Mediabase, the data provider to Radio & Records. The most noticeable feature of this new chart was its ambiguous recurrent rule. Songs would be removed regularly from within the top 15, seemingly regardless of the number of weeks they had spent on the chart. Additionally, the chart has resulted in songs that otherwise peaked at Nos. 41–50 on R&R's charts appearing on the AT40 charts. This chart lasted until August 11, 2001, when AT40 returned to the Radio & Records pop chart. The return coincided with another modification in the recurrent rule; songs would be removed below No. 25 after three consecutive weeks without a bullet (an increase in radio plays). This change would be short-lived, as in November 2001, Radio & Records returned to the 20 weeks/below No. 20 rule, which remained in place for the remainder of Kasem's tenure.

== Spin-off programming ==
=== Adult Contemporary countdowns ===
When Kasem joined what was then AMFM Radio Networks, he had been doing two weekly countdowns for adult contemporary formatted stations. Both of these shows would find a home with him at his new syndicator and were rebranded once he joined. Both shows took the name American Top 20 (AT20) and launched the same weekend as Kasem's new AT40. He would concurrently host both shows with AT40 until he handed the show over to Ryan Seacrest in January 2004, then continue as host of the AC countdowns until he retired in 2009. After Kasem retired, the Hot AC American Top 20 and the Adult Contemporary American Top 10 were discontinued.

In December 2004, Premiere Networks launched a version of Seacrest's AT40 for the same hot adult contemporary stations that AT20 had been targeting. Although such a move made AT20 redundant, Premiere continued to offer Hot AC countdowns hosted by both Kasem (AT20) and Seacrest (AT40) from December 2004 thru July 2009.

=== Television spinoff ===
From 1980 to 1992, a video version of the show entitled America's Top 10 was aired in syndication to television stations across the United States. Kasem hosted this version from 1980 to 1989. When Kasem left American Top 40 in 1988, he remained as host of America's Top 10 until the end of 1989, when he would be replaced by Siedah Garrett and later Tommy Puett. Kasem returned by 1991, and the show ran until 1992.

=== Other formats ===
Based on the success of American Top 40, Kasem and Don Bustany created a spinoff top 40 countdown for Watermark for Country Radio called American Country Countdown, patterned after Kasem's program. "ACC" premiered in 1973, and was hosted by Don Bowman from its inception until April 1978. Bob Kingsley replaced Bowman and hosted until the end of 2005, after which Kix Brooks of the late country music duo Brooks & Dunn took over. Brooks hosted ACC until the end of 2024. Ryan Fox, who also works as morning DJ at KPLX in Dallas, took over hosting duties for Kix Brooks the weekend of January 4, 2025. Kingsley later moved to another program, Country Top 40 which follows the same format as AT40 and ACC; Kingsley died on Thursday, October 17, 2019. Both ACC and CT40 remain on the air: ACC on Westwood One and CT40, now hosted by Fitz, syndicated by Hubbard Broadcasting.

After Kasem left ABC, the network launched American Gold, a spinoff oldies countdown (featuring far fewer songs, and often focusing on a particular artist) hosted by Dick Bartley. American Gold's last show aired at the end of March 2009, replaced with another show hosted by Bartley for United Stations Radio Networks, Classic Countdown.

In Australia, Take 40 Australia was launched in 1984 as a national music countdown show, with its song selection based on the weekly ARIA charts.

== Syndication ==
American Top 40 is available in almost every radio market in the U.S. It had at least one radio station in every state up until Rhode Island-based WSNE dropped the show in 2020. As of April 2025, New Jersey and Rhode Island are the only two states that don't have a local station carrying American Top 40. Rhode Island can still pick up the show either from Connecticut's WKSS or Boston's WXKS-FM. North Jersey can still receive the show either from New York's WHTZ or the Lehigh Valley's WAEB. KKBT in American Samoa is the only radio station based in an American territory that airs the show, although AT40 previously aired in Puerto Rico and Guam. Portions of the US Virgin Islands may receive the show from ZROD in the nearby British Virgin Islands.

In Canada, more than 50 stations air AT40, most being owned by IHeartRadio and Golden West Broadcasting. The Move Radio network stations air the show as Move Radio's Exclusive AT40 with some songs omitted and replaced with songs by Canadian artists. In 2021, Ontario-based station CKPR-FM added a special Hot AC version of the chart that included contemporary Canadian artists that also airs on CIGO-FM, CFLY-FM (Note: CFLY-FM was a "Move" branded station until 2025, but still carries the show, however the show is referred to as "The Biggest Hits Across Canada" as opposed to "The USA".), and CHRE-FM. This is done to follow Canadian broadcast regulations. Other Canadian stations like CIGL-FM, and CKSY-FM omit the optional extras.

In addition to the United States and Canada, American Top 40 is also carried by several stations worldwide, including Indigo 91.9 in India, Amber Sound FM in England, Nile FM in Egypt, and Loud FM in Saudi Arabia.

== Censorship, offensive songs and affiliate standards ==
Kasem and Watermark's policy regarding putting American Top 40 together was to always play the forty most popular songs in the United States and never to ban a record from the countdown. However, whenever songs with potentially offensive lyrical content made the top 40, Watermark would send out memos to affiliated stations alerting them of the presence of that song in the countdown and sometimes provide stations with suggestions on how to edit the song out of their AT40 broadcasts.

When the show became part of Premiere Networks in 1998, a few stations airing AT40 (especially in most countries around the world) opted to either change versions of each song or skipped some portions of the show for various reasons.

=== Offensive content ===
The first song to receive this advisory was in April and May 1971, with a spoken word piece, "The Battle Hymn of Lt. Calley", by Terry Nelson and C-Company. Some better-known songs which received this treatment included "Kodachrome" by Paul Simon, "Roxanne" by The Police, "Ain't Love a Bitch" by Rod Stewart, and "Paradise by the Dashboard Light" by Meat Loaf.

Perhaps the most infamous of these songs was Chuck Berry's number-one hit "My Ding-a-Ling", which put some stations in the odd position of having to air AT40 without playing the number-one song; at least one station, KELI in Tulsa, Oklahoma, censored out the song at its No. 1 position, replacing it with a message from station management, explaining why they chose to censor the program. The censorship of this song continued even into the twenty-first century; some stations, such as WOGL in Philadelphia, replaced this song with an optional extra when it aired a rerun of the November 18, 1972, broadcast (where it ranked at No. 14) on December 6, 2008.

In 1978, when Billy Joel's "Only the Good Die Young" (wherein Joel urged pre-marital sex by a teen Catholic girl, Virginia) was on the charts, AT40 had placed warnings in shipments to warn affiliates in highly Catholic populated areas along with a special break in the countdown for stations to substitute another song in its place. The affiliates usually used the suggestion, though some did not and no major complaints were ever heard. (Many of these memos have been reprinted in Pete Battistini's book, "American Top 40 with Casey Kasem: The 1970s".)

In situations where a charting song contained offensive language and the record company was unable to provide AT40 with a clean edit of the song, the producers would often make an edit themselves. Such was a case with Bob Dylan's Top 40 single, "George Jackson", which peaked at No. 33 in January 1972 and appeared for two weeks on AT40. The offensive lyric in the song was, "He wouldn't take shit from no one." To rectify the problem, AT40 engineer Bill Hergonson edited the lyric, which was now heard as "He wouldn't take it from no one." A similar situation occurred again in July 1975, when The Isley Brothers' "Fight the Power" was in the Top 40, but in this case, the substitute version provided by the group's label was unsuitable, resorting to the engineer to substitute grunts and extra drum beats over the offending parts of the original record. However, this was not before AT40 erroneously played the uncensored version (with the lyric "... by all this bullshit goin' down") the first two weeks on the chart, on the July 12 and 19, 1975 editions.

During the 1987 chart run of the George Michael hit “I Want Your Sex,” Kasem introduced the song without naming the title by identifying only Michael and his “current hit.”

=== Station decisions ===
According to Rob Durkee's book "American Top 40: The Countdown of the Century", Dave Morgan of WDHF (now WCHI-FM) in Chicago ghosted an edition of the program sometime in the summer of 1975. When the station's copy of the show did not arrive in time, he used Billboard's list and merely played the records, apparently heavily implying that the show was American Top 40 without actually identifying it as such. "My program director made me do it!" Morgan said years later. The following year, WDHF would refuse to play AT40's "Fourth of July's Greatest Hits" special, because No. 1 hits from the pre-rock era were overabundant in the special. But while the special was a stark departure from the contemporary sound of the 1970s, Tom Rounds in his press release reminded stations that it was the United States' "one and only bicentennial."

== Special countdowns ==
Occasionally American Top 40 airs special countdowns in place of the regular American Top 40 countdown show. These included:

- "Top 40 Recording Acts of the Rock Era 1955–1971" (Weekend of May 1–2, 1971)
- "Top 40 Christmas Songs" (Weekend of December 25–26, 1971)
- "Top 40 Songs of the Rock Era 1955–1972" (weekend of July 1–2, 1972)
- "Top 40 Albums of the Week" (weekend of August 5–6, 1972; the Top 40 singles were also counted down alongside that week's albums)
- "Top 40 Artists from Sept 1, 1967, to Sept 1, 1972" (weekend of September 30 – October 1, 1972)
- "Top 40 Songs from March 1968 to March 1973" (weekend of April 7–8, 1973)
- "Top 40 Disappearing Acts" (weekend of July 7–8, 1973)
- "Top 40 Recording Acts of the Rock Era 1955–1973" (weekend of October 6–7, 1973)
- "Top 40 Christmas Songs" (weekend of December 22–23, 1973)
- "Top 40 Hits of British Artists 1955–1974" (weekend of April 6–7, 1974)
- "Top 40 Acts of the 1970s, So Far" (weekend of July 6–7, 1974)
- "Top 10 Producers of the 1970s" (weekend of October 5–6, 1974)
- "Top 40 Disappearing Acts" (weekend of April 1–2, 1975)
- "Top 40 Rock 'n' Roll Acts of the 1950s" (weekend of October 4–5, 1975)
- "Bicentennial Special: #1 July 4 Songs of the Past 40 Years" (weekend of July 3–4, 1976)
- "Top 40 Songs of the 'Beatle Years'[1964–1970]" (weekend of October 2–3, 1976)
- "Top 40 Girls of the Rock Era 1955–1977" (weekend of July 2–3, 1977)
- "Top 40 Movie Songs 1960–1978" (weekend of Apr 4–5, 1978)
- "Top 40 Acts of the 1970s, So Far" (weekend of Jul 1–2, 1978)
- "The Top 40 Songs of the Disco Era 1974–1979" (weekend of July 7–8, 1979)
- "The Top 50 Songs of the 1970s" (weekend of January 5–6, 1980)
- "AT40 Book of Records" (weekend of July 5–6, 1980)
- "Top 40 Hits of the Beatles: Together and Apart" (weekend of July 4–5, 1981)
- "Top 40 Acts of the 1980s, So Far" (weekend of July 2–3, 1983)
- "Giants of Rock" (weekend of July 5–6, 1986)
- "Top 40 Hits of the 1980s, So Far" (weekend of July 4–5, 1987)
- "Top 40 Newcomers of the 1980s, So Far" (weekend of May 30–31, 1988)
- "Triathlon of Rock 'n Roll" (weekend of July 4–5, 1988)
- "World Tour" (weekend of May 27–29, 1989)
- "AT40 Book of Records, 1980s Edition" (weekend of August 31 – September 4, 1989)
- "Top 40 American Acts of the Previous 10 Years" (weekend of July 1–2, 1991)
- "Top 40 Hits of the Past Decade" (weekend of January 2–3, 2010)
- "Top 40 Songs of the Decade" (weekend of December 28–29, 2019)

=== Annual countdowns ===
The top songs of the year are counted down near the turning of each year, though the format has varied over the years.

- Top 40 (over 1 week): 1971, 1973, 1999, 2010–present*
- Top 50 (over 1 week): 1979, 1994
- Top 80 (over 2 weeks): 1970, 1972
- Top 100 (over 2 weeks): 1974–78, 1980–82, 1992, 1998, 2000–09
- Top 100 (over 1 week): 1983–91, 1993

During the show's original run, the 2-week Top 100 programs came with special instructions for editing the show into one 8-hour block. Conversely, the 1-week Top 100 programs came with instructions to split the show into two 4-hour blocks.

In 1971 and 1973, only the top 40 was counted down because of AT40's Top 40 Christmas Countdowns which aired the week prior. The show did not air Christmas countdowns again until the spinoff shows "American Top 20" and "American Top 10" came into existence, as both of these spinoffs aired a "Top 60 Christmas Songs" special annually the two weeks immediately preceding Christmas.

Since 2010, the show has aired the same Top 40 year-end chart two weeks in a row, with the only differences being the optional AT40 Extras and re-cut announcements mentioning the Dick Clark's New Year's Rockin' Eve (which Seacrest also hosts) as a past event instead of an upcoming event. An exception to this was in 2019 when the year-end chart was aired only on the weekend before Christmas, because the decade-end chart would air the following weekend, with the normal chart resuming the first weekend of January.

On the Top 40 charts, these were the songs that finished as the #1 songs of the year.

- 1970: "Bridge over Troubled Water" by Simon & Garfunkel
- 1971: "Joy to the World" by Three Dog Night
- 1972: "The First Time Ever I Saw Your Face" by Roberta Flack
- 1973: "Tie a Yellow Ribbon 'Round the Ole Oak Tree" by Tony Orlando and Dawn
- 1974: "The Way We Were" by Barbra Streisand
- 1975: "Love Will Keep Us Together" by Captain & Tennille
- 1976: "Silly Love Songs" by Wings
- 1977: "I Just Want to Be Your Everything" by Andy Gibb
- 1978: "Shadow Dancing" by Andy Gibb
- 1979: "My Sharona" by The Knack
- 1980: "Call Me" by Blondie
- 1981: "Bette Davis Eyes" by Kim Carnes
- 1982: "Physical" by Olivia Newton-John
- 1983: "Every Breath You Take" by The Police
- 1984: "Say Say Say" by Paul McCartney and Michael Jackson
- 1985: "Careless Whisper" by Wham! featuring George Michael
- 1986: "That's What Friends Are For" by Dionne & Friends
- 1987: "Walk Like an Egyptian" by The Bangles
- 1988: "Faith" by George Michael
- 1989: "Look Away" by Chicago
- 1990: "Nothing Compares 2 U" by Sinéad O'Connor
- 1991: "(Everything I Do) I Do It for You" by Bryan Adams
- 1992: "End of the Road" by Boyz II Men
- 1993: "Two Princes" by Spin Doctors
- 1994: "The Sign" by Ace of Base
- 1998: "Iris" by Goo Goo Dolls
- 1999: "Every Morning" by Sugar Ray
- 2000: "Everything You Want" by Vertical Horizon
- 2001: "Hanging by a Moment" by Lifehouse
- 2002: "How You Remind Me" by Nickelback
- 2003: "When I'm Gone" by 3 Doors Down
- 2004: "Yeah!" by Usher featuring Ludacris and Lil Jon
- 2005: "Since U Been Gone" by Kelly Clarkson
- 2006: "Hips Don't Lie" by Shakira featuring Wyclef Jean
- 2007: "Big Girls Don't Cry" by Fergie
- 2008: "Bleeding Love" by Leona Lewis
- 2009: "Poker Face" by Lady Gaga
- 2010: "Tik Tok" by Kesha
- 2011: "Give Me Everything" by Pitbull featuring Ne-Yo, Afrojack and Nayer
- 2012: "Glad You Came" by The Wanted
- 2013: "Blurred Lines" by Robin Thicke featuring Pharrell Williams and T.I.
- 2014: "Dark Horse" by Katy Perry featuring Juicy J
- 2015: "Uptown Funk" by Mark Ronson featuring Bruno Mars
- 2016: "Stressed Out" by Twenty One Pilots
- 2017: "Shape of You" by Ed Sheeran
- 2018: "New Rules" by Dua Lipa
- 2019: "Without Me" by Halsey
- 2020: "Blinding Lights" by The Weeknd
- 2021: "Levitating" by Dua Lipa
- 2022: "Thats What I Want" by Lil Nas X
- 2023: "Die for You" by The Weeknd
- 2024: "Greedy" by Tate McRae
- 2025: "Die with a Smile" by Lady Gaga and Bruno Mars

The songs that finished at #1 on the Hot AC charts were as follows.

- 2009: "You Found Me" by The Fray
- 2010: "Hey, Soul Sister" by Train
- 2011: "Rolling in the Deep" by Adele
- 2012: "Stronger" by Kelly Clarkson
- 2013: "Ho Hey" by The Lumineers
- 2014: "Best Day of My Life" by American Authors
- 2015: "Shut Up and Dance" by Walk the Moon
- 2016: "Stitches" by Shawn Mendes
- 2017: "Shape of You" by Ed Sheeran
- 2018: "Perfect" by Ed Sheeran
- 2019: "High Hopes" by Panic! at the Disco
- 2020: "Circles" by Post Malone
- 2021: "Levitating" by Dua Lipa
- 2022: "Stay" by The Kid Laroi and Justin Bieber
- 2023: "Flowers" by Miley Cyrus
- 2024: "Lose Control" by Teddy Swims
- 2025: "Die with a Smile" by Lady Gaga and Bruno Mars

=== Decade-end countdowns ===
In 1979, 1999, 2009 and 2019, the show aired special countdowns of the decade's biggest hits. In 1979 and 1999, the annual year-end countdown show was cut to one week (4 hours) to accommodate the special countdown, though in 2009, they aired a third special week after their usual two-week Top 100. The decade-end shows counted down the Top 50 of the 1970s, and the Top 40s of the 1990s, 2000s, and 2010s. There was no decade-end countdown for the 1980s.

== Substitute hosts and guest co-hosts ==
Over 50 celebrities—among them radio personalities, game show hosts, and (particularly since Ryan Seacrest took over hosting duties) charting artists—have substituted for these three throughout the show's run. Radio announcer Charlie Van Dyke filled in for Kasem a record 31 times in the 1980s.
