= CT40 =

CT40 may refer to:

- Bob Kingsley's Country Top 40, a radio show hosted by Bob Kingsley from 2006
- Casey's Top 40, a 1990s radio show hosted by Casey Kasem
- 40CT cannon, a 40 mm cannon developed by CTA International
- Connecticut Route 40
