= Radio Express =

American independent radio syndication company

- Company type: Private
- Industry: Radio broadcasting, advertising
- Founded: 1985
- Headquarters: Pasadena, California
- Key people: Paul Hollins (Owner & CEO) Jessica D'Agostin (President of Sales) Ivan Laskov (Head of Content) Jorge Paula-Rodriguez (Accounts Manager)
- Website: radioexpress.com

Radio Express is an independent radio syndication company based in Pasadena, California, whose main focus is in markets outside the U.S. The company was founded by Tom Rounds, one of the creators of American Top 40. Radio Express was created in 1985 as a way to distribute AT40 to stations outside the United States, three years after ABC Radio Networks acquired AT40's production company, Watermark Inc.

Radio Express produces and syndicates the Official World Chart hosted by PJ Butta, the UK CHART hosted by Tom Watts and the Kim Wilde 80s show among other programming. The company also handles syndication outside the US for American radio programs such as The Rick Dees Weekly Top 40, Full Throttle Radio, The Dave Koz Radio Show, Bob Kingsley's Country Top 40 and American Country Countdown, as well as for major international special events such as the Live 8 and Live Earth concerts.

Radio Express is active in international barter syndication, for advertisers like Coca-Cola, Zain, Airtel and Heineken.

In 2014, Radio Express entered the agreement with Premiere Networks to distribute selected Premiere radio programs in selected countries, including AT40, which is now part of Premiere's syndication lineup since 1999. Aside from AT40 (both the current edition, and its 70s/80s edition), Radio Express will also distribute other Premiere shows such as On Air with Ryan Seacrest, Crook & Chase Countdown, On with Mario Lopez, Sixx Sense with Nikki Sixx, The Side Show Countdown with Nikki Sixx, and the Weekend top 30 with Hollywood Hamilton/DJ Pup Dawg, as well as marketing audio services such as Mediabase.
