= Casey's Top 40 =

US Radio Program

- Genre: Music chart show
- Running time: 4 hrs. (including commercials); 3hrs. + 15 min. (w/out commercials)
- Country of origin: United States
- Syndicates: Westwood One
- Hosted by: Casey Kasem; Mark Elliot (original substitute); David Perry (later substitute)
- Created by: Westwood One
- Produced by: Karen Shearer (1989); Bert Kleinman (1989-1996); Lorre Crimi (1996-February 1998); Ben Harris (February 1998-cancellation)
- Executive producer: Norman Pattiz
- Original release: January 21, 1989 – March 21, 1998

Casey's Top 40 was a syndicated radio music program that was distributed by the Westwood One radio network. The show was a vehicle for former American Top 40 host and co-creator Casey Kasem and ran for over nine years. Like Kasem's prior show, Casey's Top 40 aired on weekends, emanated from Hollywood, California, and was a countdown of the 40 biggest hits of the week on the popular music chart. Unlike American Top 40, this show is not replayed or syndicated, whilst the former is still currently being replayed and syndicated.

== Background ==
In February 1988, after negotiations on a new contract had been unsuccessful, ABC Watermark announced that it would be searching for a new host for American Top 40, and that May the syndicator hired Shadoe Stevens to take Kasem's place. After eighteen years hosting the show that he created, Kasem's final episode of the original American Top 40 aired on the weekend of August 6, 1988. Kasem remained under contract with ABC Watermark for the rest of 1988, the final year of a contract he signed in 1981, and as part of his exit he agreed to allow the network to continue using the branding through a licensing arrangement.

Meanwhile, Westwood One approached Kasem shortly after ABC Watermark announced they would be looking for his replacement and made him an offer that would have paid Kasem three times what he was making on AT40. The two sides reached an agreement in April of that year, and Kasem joined the network. Due to his contract still being in force, Westwood One could not use Kasem until early 1989 when the contract ran out.

However, with the veteran disc jockey now part of their ranks, Westwood One made a significant effort to promote Kasem's arrival. A promotional package was sent to potential affiliates which included a “Westwood One Survival Kit” for the interim period that was labeled “What to Do Until Casey Comes.” Inside the kit were a “shadow simulator” (portable flashlight), a button reading “Casey in ‘89,” and a pin with the date of his premiere on Westwood One.

Casey's Top 40 premiered on the weekend of January 21, 1989 on stations both within the United States and overseas. Some of those stations had been carrying American Top 40, and opted to drop it in favor of Kasem's new show; in some cases both countdowns aired on the same station.

== Substitute hosts ==
As on AT40, Kasem would require substitute hosts from time to time. In the early years of the show, the role was filled by voiceover artist Mark Elliott, who had also been one of many substitutes for Kasem on AT40. From 1993 until 1998, veteran Los Angeles DJ David Perry was the designated fill-in.

== Similarities between Casey's Top 40 and AT40 ==
Casey's Top 40 was similar to Kasem's old AT40 show, featuring Kasem's trademark voice, teasers and trivia about songs and artists (including the "stretch" stories). However, while American Top 40 used the Billboard Hot 100 as its source, Casey's Top 40 used the weekly CHR airplay-based survey produced by Westwood One's then-subsidiary Radio & Records. AT40 would eventually follow suit by moving to airplay-only charts, switching first to the Billboard Hot 100 Airplay chart and then to its Mainstream Top 40 chart.

When it launched, Casey's Top 40 was one of several shows using the Radio & Records chart; in addition to Unistar Radio Network's Rick Dees Weekly Top 40, this list included two programs already under Westwood One's corporate umbrella, The National Music Survey hosted by Charlie Tuna for Mutual (but using the R&R AC survey instead) and Rockin' America Top 30 Countdown hosted by Scott Shannon for Westwood One.

In 1994, Radio & Records split its weekly CHR survey into two different trackers. One focused on stations with a dance/rap/R&B-centered playlist, called the "CHR/Rhythmic" chart. The other chart, which tracked more traditional pop music was now called CHR/Pop, and it became the new chart source for Kasem's countdown, beginning with the program airing the weekend of April 30, 1994.

Like AT40, Casey's Top 40 was timed to generally fit ten songs per one hour. The show divided each hour into segments, with four three-minute commercial breaks inserted per hour. Each hour consisted of five segments, the last of which was the shortest. Unique to Casey's Top 40, the last segment for each hour (never the last hour) consisted of one song and a teaser by Kasem used to segue into the next hour, followed by a musical bumper for stations to play their hourly required station identification, before immediately going into the next song on the countdown to start the next hour; this segue would carry over to the revived AT40 in 1998.

=== Features ===
- Last Week's Top 3: As he had done on American Top 40, Kasem would begin each countdown a rundown of the top three songs from the previous week's survey, often playing the previous week's chart topper to begin the show (although this became more infrequent as the years went on). The first of these was "Two Hearts" by Phil Collins, which had reached the top spot the week before Casey's Top 40 premiered and would retain its No. 1 spot that week.
- Jingles: A new set of jingles was recorded for Casey's Top 40 by JAM Creative Productions, which included the usual song-number and title bumper jingles as well as the trademark "Casey's coast to coast" jingle from AT40 recorded in a different rhythm and key. JAM also composed the show's opening theme, which included singers doing a count down shout counting down from ten over the music until they reached "Number One!", something that would follow Kasem for the rest of his career. His AC spinoff Casey's Countdown also had its slogan jingle created by JAM ("Casey Counts Them Down"), which would be later used on his other countdown shows. Initially, some of these jingles referred to the show as "CT40", but ABC Watermark won an injunction preventing this reference for being too similar to "AT40".
- Droppers, Biggest Movers and Longest-Charting Song: For each song that debuted on the countdown, one had to fall out of the top 40 to make room. Kasem referred to these as "droppers" and would identify the songs that the show had to "say goodbye to" that week. He would also identify the song making the largest leap up the chart and the longest-charting song still in the Top 40.
- Request and Dedication: Kasem continued to take requests from fans requesting songs dedicated to others who affected their lives. Since he could not use the AT40 title "Long Distance Dedication", these became known as "Requests and Dedications", with typically three of these segments airing per show. Originally, these requests were received entirely by postal mail, but listeners were later provided the ability to fax in their requests. Beginning with the countdown airing the weekend of July 8, 1995, listeners could also submit requests through an America Online email account created specifically for Kasem's program.
- Request and Dedication Update: Later in the show's run, the producers began reaching out to the listeners who had their Requests and Dedications fulfilled. Those same people were encouraged to follow up with the show by sending postcards to the producers with their telephone numbers if they had updates on their situation. If one was selected, Kasem would phone that person and conduct a brief interview, of which a snippet would play during the following countdown. This was largely a feature unique to Casey's Top 40, as the original AT40 very seldom included updates for past Long-Distance Dedications.
- Affiliate mentions: Another AT40 staple included in Casey's Top 40 was Kasem's hourly mention of some of the "great radio stations" carrying his show.
- Other charts: Kasem continued his AT40 tradition of announcing the songs topping other Radio & Records charts during the final hour of each countdown. He usually made mention of the R&B (originally Black) and country charts, later adding the adult contemporary chart and the alternative rock chart once those launched. If any of those songs appeared in the top 40, Kasem would make note of it before playing the song.
- Special reports: Usually at least once per episode, Kasem would break from the countdown to report on an item of relevance, such as a snippet of music news, or field a listener question.
- Trivia Quiz: Once per episode, Kasem would lead into a commercial with a music question with three multiple-choice answers. After the commercial played, he would answer.
- Casey's Top 40 Concert Calendar: Unique to Casey's Top 40, Kasem would give a rundown of prominent bands with upcoming concerts.
- Closing: The final segment of each countdown featured the top two songs on the survey, just as Kasem had done on AT40. After playing the No. 1 song of the week, Kasem would read the show's credits and sign off with his trademark "keep your feet on the ground and keep reaching for the stars". He would also usually add "and keep your dial/radio tuned right where it is" to encourage listeners to keep listening to their Casey's Top 40 affiliate. That last portion was another carryover from AT40, which was used from 1977 to 1984, and would be used with AT40's revival in 1998.

=== Casey's Biggest Hits ===
As a further promotional tool for the show, Westwood One added a weekly strip of interstitial segments featuring past chart hits to the countdown package shipped to the affiliates, designed to be played during the week. Each week, five segments were produced, each usually longer than five minutes, with Kasem offering a teaser for the past hit. After a 60-second commercial break, he would return with the story behind the teaser and then play the song.

== Special shows ==
Kasem would occasionally host special countdowns focusing on past hits, such as his countdown of the greatest summer songs of the 1980s, which aired on July 7, 1990.

=== Year-end Top 100 ===
As with AT40, each December, Kasem presented a two-part, eight-hour, 100-song countdown of the past year's hits. These episodes were usually aired around Christmas and New Year's Day, with the first 50 songs comprising one episode and the rest airing the following week. Kasem did a total of nine of these year-end countdowns, with the last airing over the weekends of December 27, 1997 and January 3, 1998.

Below is a chart of the songs that finished the year at No. 1. For the first year CT40 was on the air, only a Top 40 list was compiled.

Year	Song	Artist	Source
1989	"Miss You Much"	Janet Jackson	
1990	"Vision of Love"	Mariah Carey	
1991	"(Everything I Do) I Do It for You"	Bryan Adams	
1992	"End of the Road"	Boyz II Men	
1993	"Dreamlover"	Mariah Carey	
1994	"The Sign"	Ace of Base	
1995	"I Know"	Dionne Farris	
1996	"Missing"	Everything but the Girl	
1997	"You Were Meant for Me"	Jewel	

== Expansion into adult contemporary charts ==
As with AT40, Casey's Top 40 also had problems with some stations reluctant to play music that did not agree with their format. In one example, WSTR in Atlanta, Georgia, being an anti-rap station and a very Adult Contemporary-leaning CHR, edited "Another Night" by Real McCoy (a Euro disco record with rap breaks) out of its broadcasts of Casey's Top 40 in 1994, even while the song was at No. 1 on the show.

In 1992, Kasem added a second countdown show. With mainstream pop radio in decline, and many Casey's Top 40 affiliates having an adult contemporary format, Westwood One launched Casey's Countdown on March 7, 1992, as a three-hour, 25-song countdown (reduced to 20 on August 13, 1994), using the Radio & Records AC chart. In addition to the weekly hits and "Request and Dedication" pieces, Casey's Countdown also included what was referred to as “Extras”, which were past hits from artists with anecdotes from Kasem.

On November 5, 1994, Kasem began yet another show, Casey's Hot 20, a three-hour countdown that used a new Radio & Records hot adult contemporary chart that had launched in April. The format was nearly identical to Casey's Countdown.

As on the parent program, both Casey's Countdown and Casey's Hot 20 concluded their years with an annual special featuring the top hits of the year. Casey's Countdown featured a two-part, seventy-song countdown in 1992 and 1993, reduced to thirty-five beginning in 1994. Casey's Hot 20 featured only thirty-five songs in its abbreviated first year countdown, but beginning in 1995 this was expanded to sixty over two programs.

The songs that finished the year atop the charts are as follows:

Year	Casey's Countdown	Casey's Hot 20
1992	"The One", Elton John	n/a
1993	"Love Is", Vanessa Williams and Brian McKnight	n/a
1994	"Now and Forever", Richard Marx	"Now and Forever", Richard Marx^{1}
1995	"Love Will Keep Us Alive", The Eagles	"In the House of Stone and Light", Martin Page
1996	"Because You Loved Me", Celine Dion	"Give Me One Reason", Tracy Chapman
1997	"Un-Break My Heart", Toni Braxton	"Barely Breathing", Duncan Sheik

^{1} In 1994, Radio & Records did not compile a year end Hot AC list. The countdown was instead based on data gathered by the producers of Casey's Hot 20.

== The end at Westwood One, and the rebirth of AT40 ==
Entering the final months of 1997, with Kasem's contract once again up for renewal, problems surfaced between himself and his syndicator. While Casey's Top 40 was still a popular program domestically and overseas, by 1997 it was not airing on as many stations as it had during its peak and had disappeared from several large markets altogether. Westwood One felt that the decline in affiliates and the subsequent loss of advertising revenue did not justify the demands made by Kasem. Kasem was also upset, as a series of mergers made during the previous contract period brought Westwood One under the CBS corporate umbrella and he felt that the new parent had not taken advantage of potential crossover marketing opportunities.

Still, Westwood One was not willing to risk losing Kasem to a competitor after having him on their roster for the previous nine years and the two sides struck an agreement in December. Unlike the previous contracts, Westwood One agreed to only a one-year renewal and included a contingency plan regarding advertising revenue; this would prove important in what followed, as would two significant events that happened to coincide with the renewal of Kasem's contract.

Toward the end of 1997, Evergreen Media Corporation and Chancellor Broadcasting combined to form Chancellor Media, a forerunner of today's iHeartRadio. The newly merged company decided shortly thereafter to enter the radio syndication game and AMFM Radio Networks (now Premiere Radio Networks) was formed as a result. Chancellor began seeking out high-end talent to fill spots in its syndication lineup, and one of their targets proved to be Kasem, who was mutually interested.

Meanwhile, there was another significant development in Kasem's career that happened around this same time, and it involved the licensing arrangement mentioned earlier. ABC Watermark had cancelled American Top 40 in 1994, and the show aired its final edition in January of 1995. In December 1997, the licensing arrangement had lapsed, and as per its original terms both Kasem and co-creator Don Bustany were to have the rights to the branding revert to them. Shortly after Kasem left the show, Bustany had decided to retire and have no further involvement with ABC Watermark; this left Kasem with sole possession of the branding.

This had created another point of contention between Kasem and Westwood One, as he wanted to change the name of Casey's Top 40 to American Top 40 and the network was not willing to oblige. AMFM, however, was, and despite having just signed the extension with Westwood One, Kasem was now eager to move to AMFM. He found a loophole in the advertising revenue clause mentioned before. The clause stated that if the countdown was not generating $6 million in advertising revenue, both sides had an option to break the contract.

While he and AMFM continued to negotiate terms, Kasem continued on with his other countdowns through the first two months of 1998. On the weekend of February 21, which was also the week of the annual presentation of the Grammy Awards, Kasem presided over all three of his Westwood One shows for what would prove to be the final time. He gave no indication on air that he would be leaving, instead signing off as he always did by inviting the listeners to join him on the following program and saying his famous “keep your feet on the ground and keep reaching for the stars” catchphrase. Shortly thereafter, Kasem announced he was exercising his option to end the contract early and that he was leaving Westwood One for AMFM. The deal included the transferring of the AT40 branding to the new syndicator. CBS, Westwood One, and its parent company Infinity Broadcasting responded by filing a breach of contract lawsuit against Kasem, who justified the decision by criticizing the lack of effort to promote the countdown across the networks of CBS.

Meanwhile, Westwood One carried on with the three weekend countdowns as they had before. David Perry took over as host for Kasem beginning on February 28, with veteran show staffer Ben Harris promoted to producer as previous producer Lorre Crimi followed Kasem to AMFM. Then, on March 14, another set of changes was made. Casey's Top 40 and Casey's Hot 20 saw their titles add the word “Countdown” to them while dropping Kasem's name (becoming The Top 40 Countdown and The Hot 20 Countdown), while Casey's Countdown changed its name to The AC Countdown. Although the special features of these shows, especially the Requests and Dedications, were otherwise left intact, the host would read the body of the request and not mention Kasem at all or even start with “Dear Casey”.

However, after making these changes, Westwood One abruptly shifted course and cancelled all three countdowns. Their final editions all aired a week after the name changes became official, on the weekend of March 21, 1998. Perry was not involved; instead the hosting duties were shared by Jeff Wyatt, who hosted the pop and AC countdowns, and John Tesh, who hosted the hot AC countdown. Westwood One gave no indication of the cancellation on any of the three countdowns that week, as Wyatt and Tesh both continued to solicit for Requests and Dedications as well as updates from past senders.

Although the legal dispute over Kasem's departure continued, Westwood One did not object to his continued use of the Radio & Records charts for the new American Top 40, which premiered on March 28, 1998. (The show would continue to use the chart for several more years before switching to Mediabase to track its songs.)

Kasem's adult contemporary countdowns were rebranded as, American Top 20 for their debut on the network. Kasem would host all three countdowns simultaneously until January 3, 2004; after this, he continued on with his adult contemporary countdowns until his retirement on July 4, 2009.

== Sources ==
- Durkee, Rob. American Top 40: The Countdown of the Century. ISBN 0-02-864895-1. New York City: Schirmer Books, 1999. Accessed December 10, 2007.
