= Shuckatoom =

American Top 40 theme music (1975-1984)

Single
- Recorded: 1975
- Studio: TM Productions
- Genre: Disco
- Length: 2:30 (Note: The official length of "Shuckatoom" according to cue sheets is 2:30. However, the actual runtime when accounting for dead air is closer to 2:10.)
- Label: Markwater Music/BMI
- Songwriter: Jim Kirk

Audio sample
- file; help

"Shuckatoom" (officially known as "Shuckatoom" Theme From American Top Forty on cue sheets) is theme music written by James R. "Jim" Kirk for Casey Kasem's weekly radio program, American Top 40. In use from October 1975 to January 1984, it was one of the program's longest serving pieces of theme music.

== History ==
When American Top 40 first launched in July 1970, the jingles and music beds were created by PAMS, a radio jingle company from Dallas, Texas. The main theme music used to open and close the show was composed on a Moog synthesizer by Jim Kirk, with supervision by AT40 co-creator Ron Jacobs. In January 1973, a more subdued version of the Moog theme began to be used to close the show, while the original 1970 theme continued to open the show.

By 1975, PAMS was starting to face business difficulties, so AT40’s production company, Watermark Inc., began to look for a new jingle vendor. Watermark ended up contracting TM Productions, also out of Dallas, to produce new show jingles and themes. Kirk had been hired as the Creative Director at TM Productions in 1975, so he once again played a leading role in shaping the new AT40 sound. The new main theme, dubbed "Shuckatoom", was the only AT40 theme that received an official unique name, beyond just being called variants of "theme" on cue sheets and internal documents.

Departing from the synthesizer-driven 1970 Moog theme, "Shuckatoom" instead leaned more into a string and horn focused sound, reflecting the increasing popularity of disco music on the record charts. The opening orchestral fanfare was based around the show's "Casey's coast-to-coast" jingle, which proved to be a popular leitmotif for AT40 that was incorporated into future themes for the show. "Shuckatoom" is mostly an instrumental, with the only lyric being the nonsense word "shuckatoom" sung around the one minute and forty second mark. When used in a typical radio broadcast, "Shuckatoom" would usually have been faded out before it ever reached that part.

From its first appearance on October 4, 1975 until its final appearance on January 7, 1984, "Shuckatoom" was used in 428 different shows of American Top 40. (Note: The four weekly shows from September 22, 1979 to October 13, 1979 did not use "Shuckatoom". This figure is also counting the "Top 100 of 1983" special as one continuous eight-hour show as packaged by ABC Watermark, even though it was structured in a way that it could be broadcast as two four-hour shows like previous year-end countdowns.)

Although the cue sheets that listed the "Shuckatoom" theme indicated it was published by Markwater Music and licensed through BMI, the tune was never made available separate from the show itself. Only by owning a copy of the correct show would anyone be able to obtain an "in the clear" copy of the show themes. Additionally, although "Shuckatoom" ceased being used as the closing theme starting with the September 22, 1979 show, cue sheets continued to incorrectly list "Shuckatoom" as being part of the closing segment as late as the April 3, 1982 show.

== Notable usage milestones ==
Throughout its usage on American Top 40, "Shuckatoom" was used in various places in the show, which changed over time.

- October 4, 1975 - First appearance on AT40. This show was a special, the "Top 40 Rock & Roll Acts of the 1950s". To close the show, Kasem delivered his outro over the 1973 Moog theme. When his voice-over concluded, the program transitioned into "Shuckatoom", played in full.
- November 8, 1975 - First time used to open and close AT40. "Shuckatoom" replaced the original 1970 Moog theme used to open the show. The show closing continued to be Kasem speaking over the 1973 Moog theme before transitioning to "Shuckatoom" in the clear.
- July 10, 1976 - "Shuckatoom" becomes the sole closing theme. From this show going forward, the 1973 Moog theme was eliminated from the closing, (Note: The 1973 Moog theme was still used as an end-of-hour theme up until the last three-hour show on September 30, 1978. At 5 years and 9 months of usage, it was the second-longest serving AT40 theme, after the 8 years and 3 months of "Shuckatoom". The 1970 Moog theme places third at 5 years and 4 months.) and Kasem spoke directly over "Shuckatoom". "Shuckatoom" also began to be used as a top-of-hour theme.
- September 22, 1979 - "Shuckatoom" replaced as closing and top-of-hour theme. AT40 began using a new closing and top-of-hour theme, unofficially known as the "Coast-to-Coast Fanfare" or "Dark Disco" theme. This was also the start of a brief experimental period where "Shuckatoom" was replaced as the opening theme, which ended with the October 20, 1979 show when "Shuckatoom" returned as the opening theme.
- January 7, 1984 - Final appearance on AT40. This show, guest hosted by Charlie Van Dyke, was the last one to use "Shuckatoom" to open the show. The following week when Kasem returned, a completely new theme and jingle package developed by JAM Creative Productions was used.
