= Dick Bartley's Classic Hits =

Dick Bartley's Classic Hits was a syndicated weekly, four-hour, classic hits program written, produced and hosted by Radio Hall-of-Fame broadcaster Dick Bartley. It was syndicated across the country by United Stations Radio Networks and internationally via Radio Express.

Twenty featured songs from a particular month — alternating between 1970s and 1980s from week to week — were featured and played countdown-style, from No. 20 to No. 1. The Billboard Hot 100 chart is the standard for this ranking.

Dick Bartley's Classic Hits was based upon two previous oldies programs Bartley hosted, the countdown series Classic Countdown (previously known as American Gold) and the live request series Rock and Roll's Greatest Hits. In July 2017, the programs were combined, taking on its latest name. The program was pre-recorded (Rock & Roll's Greatest Hits, while live for most of its run, had transitioned to being pre-recorded shortly after joining United Stations).

On December 15, 2021, Bartley announced that the show would end during the weekend of January 1–2, 2022.

== History ==
=== As American Gold ===
Though Bartley had hosted Rock & Roll's Greatest Hits since 1980 (a show that would be carried under various titles nationwide beginning in 1982, first with an earlier version of United Stations, then through the original Westwood One beginning in 1985), it was not until June 8, 1991, when he joined ABC Radio Networks, that he launched a countdown show. It was originally named American Gold. The concept of American Gold was loosely based upon the formats of other ABC shows, American Top 40 and American Country Countdown, except charts from a particular month or week from years' past were used. Differences between American Gold and the Classic Countdown were as follows:

- One part of the show focused on the hits of a particular three-month time span (e.g., fall of 1965 or winter of 1969-1970), while the other focused on an artist or band, stylistic trend or other theme, with their featured songs focusing generally from the era the oldies format in general came from. (For instance, if the Bee Gees were the spotlight artist on an early 1990s American Gold show, it was likely their late-1960s and early-1970s hit recordings were played rather than songs from the disco/Saturday Night Fever-phase of their career (as the late 1970s was not considered part of the oldies format at the time; such songs would instead be played on Bartley's 70s/80s program Yesterday Live), whereas an artist spotlight on the brothers Gibb from late in the run would emphasize their late-1970s disco output, in addition to their earlier material.)
- Like the current Classic Countdown, the show's playlist focused on the oldies format's focus of the time—to mean, late 1950s through early 1970s with an emphasis on the 1960s during the early years, before drifting to the 1964-late 1970s era during the 2000s, with scattered 1980s titles by the end of the run.
- Prior to about 2007, "The Quiz Man" call-in contest allowed listeners to win prizes by answering a trivia question or identifying a one-hit wonder song. This feature did not carry over to the Classic Countdown.
- American Gold and Rock & Roll's Greatest Hits would semi-regularly record episodes at Walt Disney World in Orlando, Florida after The Walt Disney Company bought ABC in 1996.

In 2017, the new Classic Hits program used the American Gold format, only this time focusing on music of the 1970s and 1980s (with increasing early 1990s music included by the late 2010s).

Bartley announced his departure from ABC effective March 31, 2009. His last American Gold show, a 1975 Yearbook, was released to stations March 28, and relaunched the weekend of April 1 by the United Stations Radio Networks under its current name. WestwoodOne, who acquired ABC's radio assets in 2013, likely still holds rights to the "American Gold" name, which originates with ABC's former subsidiary Watermark Inc.

=== As the Classic Countdown ===
The Classic Countdown focused on the 20 biggest hits of the current month from a particular year in the past. The year range during the mid-2010s was 1970-1987. As with American Gold's countdowns of past years, Bartley would announce headlines, pop culture trends (such as styles, popular movies and TV shows, etc.) from that particular month. Music from the 1970s and 1980s fills out the playlist.

When the show debuted, the three-month time window (e.g., spring of a given year), carried over from American Gold, was still being used, with the range of feature years roughly from the late 1960s to early 1980s, with the monthly format beginning in the early 2010s.

During both eras, four weeks out of the year focus on seasonal music. These include "Summer Classics" (songs with the word "summer" or having summertime themes, aired Memorial Day weekend); "Halloween Classics" (the weekend nearest Oct. 31); "Christmas and Holiday Favorites" (the weekend nearest Dec. 25); and "All-Time Greatest Hits" (focusing on the biggest charting/"A-list" hits of the oldies/classic hits format's focus of the time, aired the weekend nearest Jan. 1).

The final episode, a countdown of the top hits of June 1984, was aired June 24, 2017; the new Dick Bartley's Classic Hits began airing a week later, with a dual spotlight on the hits of July 1976 and the Class of 1981. When the program ended, it was featuring songs that had not yet been recorded when the show began.

=== WCBS Sunday Night Countdown ===
In addition to this national show, a local Sunday Night Countdown aired for several years on WCBS-FM. The WCBS version of the show featured two top-20 (or so) lists, one of which often matched the syndicated top-20 list and spotlighted a year from the 1970s, matching it with a corresponding 10 years later, although 1978 and 1979 were matched with 1968 and 1969, respectively. For example, if the first two hours are from January 1976, then the second two hours was from January 1986.

The WCBS version of the show ended on 28 September 2014.
