= American Gold =

American Gold may refer to:

- A radio program hosted by Doug Levine on Voice of America
- A radio program hosted by Dick Bartley from 1991 to 2009, now known as Dick Bartley's Classic Hits
