= Ron Jacobs (broadcaster) =

American broadcaster (1937–2016)

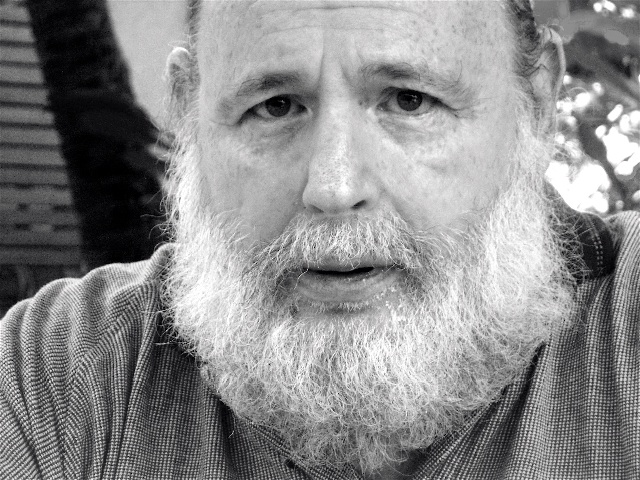
Ron Jacobs (2004)

Ron Jacobs (September 3, 1937 – March 8, 2016) was an American broadcaster, author of books and magazines, record producer and concert promoter. He is best known as the program director of KHJ radio in Los Angeles during its ground-breaking "Boss Radio" period (1965–1969), and as co-creator of the countdown show American Top 40, and the seminal radio program The History of Rock and Roll (1969).

== Early career in Hawaii ==
Jacobs was born in Honolulu, Territory of Hawaii, on September 3, 1937. His parents, Ray (a merchant) and Shirley (a homemaker) moved to the Islands from New York and New Jersey in April 1937. Jacobs was born in The Queens Hospital in Honolulu. Jacobs first attended Punahou school and dropped out of Roosevelt High School and began his radio career in 1953, upon receiving his FCC license. His first job was as the all-night DJ at Honolulu's KHON. He then went to KGU Radio, the NBC affiliate in Hawaii, as the Honolulu correspondent for the network's new program, Monitor.

In 1957, Jacobs teamed with fellow KGU DJ Tom Moffatt to jump-start Henry J. Kaiser’s new KHVH Radio. The young deejays brought the best young talent to perform concert dates in Honolulu; and developed relationships with the era’s best rock talent – including industry legends Elvis Presley and his manager, Colonel Tom Parker (they served as honorary pallbearers at Parker’s 1997 funeral).

In 1958, Jacobs was the program director at KPOA Radio in Honolulu. Then, in 1959, Jacobs launched and programmed K-POI Radio – Hawaii’s first Top 40 outlet. During this time, Jacobs wrote and produced the first Pidgin English rock ‘n’ roll records, among them: "Da Kine," about Hawaii's delayed entrance into the US, and local Hawaii rock hits by "Lance Curtis" (real name: Dick Jensen).

== Move to California ==
At 23, Jacobs moved to the U.S. mainland. In 1962, he was promoted to vice president of programming for the Colgreene Corporation. From there he programmed San Bernardino's KMEN Radio, and then, Fresno's KMAK.

In Fresno, Jacobs found himself competing head on with radio consultant Bill Drake. They soon combined their talents to program RKO General's KHJ Radio in Los Angeles. Within six months, the Drake-Jacobs’ "Boss Radio" format was Number One in America's second largest radio market, garnering national recognition for creating pop radio's most influential sound of the 1960s.

Jacobs produced the 48-hour-long History of Rock and Roll. Radio's first "rockumentary," which aired on KHJ and subsequently other stations in the RKO chain, and was accepted into the Library of Congress as the "first aural history of rock and roll music."

While programming the RKO radio chain from KHJ, Jacobs teamed again with Moffatt and Tom Rounds to form Charlatan Productions to produce films featuring recording artists in strange but eye-catching settings.

== Watermark, Inc. ==
After four years atop the L.A. radio ratings, Jacobs left KHJ to co-found and become vice president of Watermark Inc. In 1970, with Tom Rounds and veteran LA deejay Casey Kasem, Jacobs co-created the syndicated radio program American Top 40.

At Watermark, Jacobs also produced the award-winning Elvis Presley Story, written by rock author Jerry Hopkins and narrated by broadcast personality, Wink Martindale. Next, Jacobs produced a 15-album record series of legendary top-40 DJs re-creating their station's sound with the original music, commercials and jingles. The albums covered 1955 through 1969 and were titled "CRUISIN': A History of Rock 'n' Roll Radio."

Jacobs produced several other notable records at Watermark including "A Child's Garden of Grass", for Elektra Records; Key: An Album of Invisible Theater, the debut album of performance artist Meredith Monk; and, Music from Another Present Era, the first recording by the jazz ensemble, Oregon.

== To San Diego ==
Jacobs then went to San Diego to program KGB AM/FM Radio. It was there that Jacobs conceived and produced the original Home Grown album. The KGB Chicken, later known to the nation as "The San Diego Chicken" was also hatched from Jacobs' imagination.

In 1972, Ron Jacobs was honored by Billboard as Program Director of the Year. Jacobs’ documentary about Max Yasgur, on whose farm the Woodstock festival was staged, won Program of the Year honors and two years later, Billboard named KGB Station of the Year.

During this time, Ron Jacobs continued concert promotions with Tom Moffatt, Tom Rounds and Mel Lawrence. In 1964, the four men formed Arena Associates, staging the first rock show in the Honolulu International Center (now, the Neal S. Blaisdell Arena). In 1968, Arena Associates produced the Miami Pop Festival. Jacobs produced concerts at the Hollywood Bowl, Hollywood Palladium, Los Angeles Sports Arena, Orange County Fairgrounds (first US appearance of the Rolling Stones), San Diego Stadium, in conjunction with KMEN, KHJ and KGB radio stations, which he served as program director

== Return to Hawaii ==
In July 1976, Jacobs returned to an on-air position doing morning drive on KKUA Radio, in Honolulu, as "Whodaguy Ron Jacobs." It was at KKUA that Jacobs introduced Home Grown, a radio station promotion in which contest winners had the opportunity to record their winning songs for release on a compilation album with the proceeds being donated to Habilitat, a drug/alcohol rehabilitation facility in Honolulu. Jacobs did three albums, Home Grown (1976), Home Grown II and Home Grown III, that featured a track named " Kona Winds " that introduced singer Marvin Franklin, while he was at KKUA.

Jacobs’ TV career began when he hosted the Coca-Cola Record Hop on KHVH-TV, owned by Henry J. Kaiser. In 1977, Jacobs expanded his television work, producing Home Grown TV specials; a one-hour documentary on contemporary Hawaiian music entitled "Slack Key and Other Notes" (co-produced with the Hawaii Observer and Videololo II), and a quarterly magazine-format series, Pictures of Paradise, for CBS affiliate, KGMB-TV. During this period Jacobs was the TV spokesman for the local Ford dealer, "doing crazy stunts," which helped make him one of the most well known personalities.

In 1980, after leaving KKUA, Jacobs launched KDEO Radio as Hawaii's only full-time country music station, "the Western-most country station in the nation."

In 1985, in conjunction with Hawaii's visitor industry, Jacobs conceived, wrote and produced a nationwide radio promotion, The Hawaiian Chief, that ran in 48 markets in the continental United States under the sponsorship of American Airlines and Sheraton Hotels and Resorts.

In 1992, Jacobs was hired to produce and co-write the return of the radio show, Hawaii Calls. It was once again broadcast live from Waikiki, but from a different location, and lasted for less than one year.

== Final years on the airwaves ==
In 1994, Jacobs returned to Los Angeles where he joined Radio Express as executive producer of The World Chart Show.

In April 1997, Jacobs returned to Honolulu where he produced Home Grown '97, a compilation album of contest winners' songs, for KRTR-FM and an inter-island network of stations, again donating the profits from the CD of previous Island Home Grown to Habilitat, which had relocated to Kaneohe, on the island of Oahu.

On February 9, 1998, Jacobs joined KCCN/1420 as host of the morning-drive show. A year later, the station changed to an all-sports format. Jacobs left the airwaves. On July 7, 2007, Jacobs debuted the WHODAGUY website, which streamed live, 24 hours a day, traditional and contemporary Hawaiian music. Local musicians visited the Jungle Studio, playing and being interviewed. A fire in October 2009 caused the operation to shut down.

With a broadcasting career spanning six decades, the Hawaii State Legislature recognized Jacobs for his cultural contributions in the area of Hawaiian music and the Mayor of the City and County of Honolulu honored him with a "Ron Jacobs Day." In 1997, the Hawai'i Academy of Recording Arts (HARA) awarded Jacobs a Na Hoku Hanohano Award (The Hawaii recording industry's regional equivalent of the Grammy Awards). On May 3, 2015, Jacobs received the Hawai'i Academy of Recording Arts Lifetime Achievement Award for his career achievements as a radio station disc jockey and program director, record producer and promotion of Hawaiian music and Hawaii resident musicians, singers and songwriters.

He died on March 8, 2016.

== Writing career ==
Ron Jacobs was also a published author. His first book, Backdoor Waikiki, was published in 1986. For seven years he was a contributing editor to both Honolulu and Hawaii magazines. More than 150 Jacobs’ articles have appeared in both local and national publications.

In February 2002, Zapoleon Publishing, Stafford, Texas, released KHJ: Inside Boss Radio, a 407-page narrative by Ron Jacobs that included a series of oral-history interviews, memos and graphics covering Jacobs’ tenure at Boss Radio.

Ron Jacobs' book titled, OBAMALAND: Who Is Barack Obama?, published by Trade Publishing, Honolulu, November 2008, is one of the alltime nonfiction bestsellers in Hawaii. The volume, including new photos, commissioned artwork and never-before published facts about Obama's youth in Honolulu, begins in 1959, when Barack Obama, Sr., landed in Hawaii and ends with Barack Obama graduating from Punahou School and heading to California for college in 1979.

== Most recent activities ==
Jacobs resided in Pearl City, Oahu, Hawaii, where he wrote and maintained several social media sites. In 2015, Jacobs claimed to never have missed a Los Angeles Rams football game in person or on TV. At the time of his death, Jacobs was completing Locker Room Confessions, written with Todd Hewitt, longtime Rams equipment manager.

== Bibliography ==
- 440:Satisfaction, The DJs, news people and unsung radio heroes from out of our past! Go to J, scroll down to Ron Jacobs
- Pod Jockey – the talk industry's media station:
- ReelRadio.com – Reel Top 40 Radio Repository:
- https://www.93khj.com
- Honolulu Star Bulletin, November 13, 2007
- Tarnished Gold: The Record Industry Revisited, by R. Serge Denisoff, William L. Schurk, 1986, pg. 251
- Solid Gold: The Popular Record Industry - by R. Serge Denisoff, 1975. Pg 236
- Blast from the Past: A Pictorial History of Radio's First 75 Years by B. Eric Rhoads, 1995. Pg. 307
- like a joyful bird: A Memoir by Glenda Chung Hinchey, 2003. Pg. 31
- Elvis in Hawaii by Jerry Hopkins, 2002., pg. 14
- The Colonel: The Extraordinary Story of Colonel Tom Parker and Elvis Presley by Alanna Nash, 2003. Pg. 340
- Generations magazine, May 2008 issue, article by Lynn Cook
- https://www.allaccess.com/net-news/archive/story/151331/radio-legend-ron-jacobs-passes
