= Alien Worlds (radio series) =

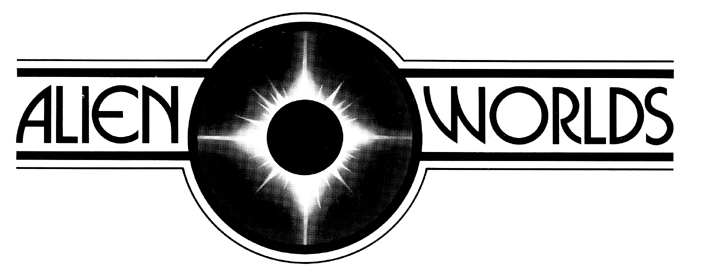
- Genre: radio show
- Running time: 30 minutes
- Country of origin: United States
- Language: English
- Syndicates: Watermark Inc.
- Starring: Linda Gary; Roger Dressler; Bruce Philip Miller; Chuck Olsen; Corey Burton
- Created by: Lee Hansen
- Written by: Lee Hansen; Ron Thompson; Ellen Pellasaro; J. Michael Straczynski
- Directed by: Lee Hansen
- Produced by: Lee Hansen
- Executive producer: Tom Rounds
- Narrated by: Roger Dressler
- Recording studio: Watermark Studios
- Original release: January 7, 1979
- No. of series: 3
- No. of episodes: 30
- Audio format: Analog
- Sponsored by: Peter Paul/Cadbury
- Website: was www.alienworlds.com - site closed as of June 4, 2018; Wayback Machine archive

Alien Worlds was a syndicated radio show created by radio personality Lee Hansen. It aired 26 half-hour episodes between 1979 and 1980, becoming well known for its realistic sound effects, high production values and documentary style of dialog. J. Michael Straczynski was one of the writers.

== Background ==
The science fiction show was first syndicated by Watermark Inc. after Lee Hansen was hired as their creative director. After advancing the concept of an action-adventure dramatic radio series, Lee began developing the concept in the fall of 1978. Watermark premiered the first episode, "The Sun Stealers", on January 7, 1979.

The series gained popularity thanks to its relatable characters, full symphonic soundtrack, realistic sound effects, high production values and documentary style format. Eventually over 500 US FM radio stations, along with stations in New Zealand and Australia aired the series. Between 1979 and 1980, 26 half-hour programs were broadcast at various times on weekends, where they gained favorable worldwide press acclaim. Alien Worlds was soon heard on a weekly basis by millions of fans and was eventually carried by over 1500 top-rated FM radio stations worldwide. The series' sponsor was Peter Paul, Cadbury which advertised Cadbury Caramello chocolates touting their caramel centers. Some parts of the series were inspired by Erich von Däniken and his theory of Ancient Aliens.

Four additional episodes were produced but never aired. The show was previously repeated on Sirius Satellite Radio, and on the Alien Worlds website (which since closed). The series is being developed for 3-D animation for television and DVD release.

== Plot summary ==
The ISA, or International Space Authority, is a governing body of space development and exploration. Organized by all earth nations, it advances humans into deep space. Their base is officially named "The Arthur C. Clarke Astronomical Observatory" or "Starlab". Commissioner White commands the base, and under his command aboard Starlab are Research Director Dr. Maura Cassidy along with Starlab's Director of Operations, Jerry Lyden, and two ISA pilots affectionately known as "rocket jockies", Captains Jon Graydon and Buddy Griff.

== Production ==
=== Cast ===
- Roger Dressler as Narrator & Commissioner Matthew White
- Linda Gary as Maura Cassidy
- Bruce Phillip Miller as SET Captain Jon Graydon
- Corey Burton as Starlab Controller Jerry Lyden & Research Assistant Tim
- Chuck Olsen as SET Captain Buddy Griff

=== Soundtrack ===
The original music score and theme, entitled The Aliens World Suite, was composed by Jim Kirk and engineered by Dick Lewzey. It was performed by the London Symphony Orchestra, comprising a 57 piece Westminster Sinfonia in Wembley, England.

Many of the realistic sound effects were recorded in four different sessions on an oil tanker in a San Pedro dry dock.

== Episode list ==
Alien Worlds - 0001 - AWB-791-1 - 79-01-06/07 - The Sun Stealers - Part 1

Alien Worlds - 0002 - AWB-791-2 - 79-01-13/14 - The Sun Stealers - Part 2

Alien Worlds - 0003 - AWB-791-3 - 79-01-20/21 - The Starsmith Project - Part 1

Alien Worlds - 0004 - AWB-791-4 - 79-01-27/28 - The Starsmith Project - Part 2

Alien Worlds - 0005 - AWB-791-5 - 79-02-03/04 - The Night Riders Of Kalimar - Part 1

Alien Worlds - 0006 - AWB-791-6 - 79-02-10/11 - The Night Riders Of Kalimar - Part 2

Alien Worlds - 0007 - AWB-791-7 - 79-02-17/18 - The Resurrectionists Of Lethe - Part 1

Alien Worlds - 0008 - AWB-791-8 - 79-02-24/25 - The Resurrectionists Of Lethe - Part 2

Alien Worlds - 0009 - AWB-791-9 - 79-03-03/04 - The Keeper Of Eight - Part 1

Alien Worlds - 0010 - AWB-791-10 - 79-03-10/11 - The Keeper Of Eight - Part 2

Alien Worlds - 0011 - AWB-791-11 - 79-03-17/18 - The ISA Conspiracy - Part 1 "The Darkbringers"

Alien Worlds - 0012 - AWB-791-12 - 79-03-24/25 - The ISA Conspiracy - Part 2 "The Deitons"

Alien Worlds - 0013 - AWB-791-13 - 79-03-31/79-04-01 - The ISA Conspiracy - Part 3 "Lightstorm"

Alien Worlds - 0014 - AWB-793-1 - 79-07-07/08 - The Kilohertz War

Alien Worlds - 0015 - AWB-793-2 - 79-07-14/15 - The Adventure Of The Egyptian Necklace - Part 1

Alien Worlds - 0016 - AWB-793-3 - 79-07-21/22 - The Adventure Of The Egyptian Necklace - Part 2

Alien Worlds - 0017 - AWB-793-4 - 79-07-28/29 - Time Clash

Alien Worlds - 0018 - AWB-793-5 - 79-08-04/05 - Deathsong

Alien Worlds - 0019 - AWB-793-6 - 79-08-11/12 - The Infinity Factor - Part 1

Alien Worlds - 0020 - AWB-793-7 - 79-08-18/19 - The Infinity Factor - Part 2

Alien Worlds - 0021 - AWB-793-8 - 79-08-25/26 - Earthlight - Part 1

Alien Worlds - 0022 - AWB-793-9 - 79-09-01/02 - Earthlight - Part 2

Alien Worlds - 0023 - AWB-793-10 - 79-09-08/09 - The Seeds Of Time

Alien Worlds - 0024 - AWB-793-11 - 79-09-15/16 - The Madonnas Of Zanzabar Alpha - Part 1

Alien Worlds - 0025 - AWB-793-12 - 79-09-22/23 - The Madonnas Of Zanzabar Alpha - Part 2

Alien Worlds - 0026 - AWB-793-13 - 79-09-29/30 - The Himalayan Parallel (Last broadcast show)

Alien Worlds - 000X - 79-10-00 - A Dream Within A Dream (Not Aired)

Alien Worlds - 000X - 79-10-00 - A Question Of Conscience (Not Aired)

Alien Worlds - 000X - 79-11-00 - The Leukocyte Maneuver (Not Aired)

Alien Worlds - 000X - 79-12-00 - The Parallax Deception (Not Aired)
