= Bob Kingsley =

American radio host (1939–2019)

- Born: March 19, 1939; San Francisco, California, U.S.
- Died: October 17, 2019 (aged 80); Weatherford, Texas, U.S.
- Occupation: Radio personality
- Known for: American Country Countdown; Bob Kingsley's Country Top 40
- Spouse: Nan Kingsley (m. 1990)
- Awards: National Radio Hall of Fame member

Robert Gibson Kingsley (March 19, 1939 – October 17, 2019) was an American country music radio personality and a member of the National Radio Hall of Fame. He was best known as the host of two nationally syndicated radio programs: American Country Countdown (ACC) and Bob Kingsley's Country Top 40.

Kingsley first worked on the radio while stationed in Iceland with the United States Air Force. He worked as a disc jockey and program director for country music stations in the 1960s and early 1970s. Kingsley became a producer of ACC in 1974 and hosted it from 1978 to 2005, and then, with his wife Nan, produced Bob Kingsley's Country Top 40 from 2006 until his death.

== Early life ==
Kingsley came down with polio when he was a school-aged child, and he enjoyed listening to the radio while he recovered: "That's all I had was that radio there. I could move my arm, my hand, just enough to turn the dial... The soap opera stuff during the day I wasn't a big fan of, but in the evening when The Green Hornet and The Fat Man and all those great old radio shows were on... I was – what, six or seven – and it stayed with me."

== Early career ==
While serving with the United States Air Force in 1959, Kingsley began his radio career at TFK, the Armed Forces Radio Service station in Keflavik, Iceland. He struggled at first. "I murdered the copy, absolutely murdered it. I'll never forget it. I wasn't very good, but I was hooked," Kingsley said many years later.

After leaving the military, Kingsley went looking for radio jobs, carrying demo tapes that he had made with an old tape recorder. After a DJ friend told him he needed a better demo tape and gave him access to a studio to record one, Kingsley found a sales job at a radio station in Palmdale, California. The station went off the air in the evenings, and they let Kingsley practice in the studio after he finished his work for the day. Kingsley said that he only sold commercials to one account in the six months he worked there. He jocked at Los Angeles country station KGBS for a few years, and then in 1970 became program director at KLAC, which had just dropped middle of the road (MOR) music for a country format.

== American Country Countdown ==
Kingsley rose to national prominence in 1974 when he became the producer of the nationally syndicated American Country Countdown (ACC). Tom Rounds, a radio executive with Watermark Inc., created ACC as a country music version of Casey Kasem's American Top 40, and Rounds had gotten Kingsley's name by word of mouth.

Kingsley succeeded the program's original host, Don Bowman, beginning in May 1978. Concurrently, Kingsley was providing voiceovers for Drake-Chenault Enterprises and its automated country music programming service. Under Kingsley's watch, ACC won Billboard's "Network/Syndicated Program of the Year: Country" 16 years in a row, the only on-air personality and music program in any format to achieve this continued success.

== Bob Kingsley's Country Top 40 ==
In 2006, Kingsley signed a new distribution deal with Jones Radio Network (later acquired by Dial Global, which was subsequently acquired by Cumulus Media). The new countdown program was called Bob Kingsley's Country Top 40 and his two-minute program was called Bob Kingsley with Today's Hit Makers. In 2015, Nash Icon (the media brand and network of country music stations owned by Cumulus Media) announced it would begin distributing classic ACC programs for syndication under the name American Country Countdown Rewind With Bob Kingsley, starting that May. With BKCT40 signing a distribution deal with Skyview Networks (which also distributes the programming of former ACC syndicator ABC) since Bob Kingsley's death, Cumulus/WW1 has discontinued ACC Rewind. Skyview continues to offer reruns of Kingsley's countdowns through its own network. Through an arrangement with Nan Kingsley and the Country Music Hall of Fame, CT40 replays currently air Saturdays on Nashville's WSM Radio.

== Personal life ==
Kingsley's wife, Nan, helped to produce Bob Kingsley's Country Top 40. The couple moved from California to Weatherford, Texas, west of the Dallas-Fort Worth area, in 1995. There they owned the Bluestem Ranch and Kingsley raised cutting horses.

== Illness and death ==
In October 2019, Kingsley was diagnosed with bladder cancer, forcing him to cede CT40 hosting duties for what was intended to be a temporary leave of absence. Kingsley died at his home in Weatherford on October 17, 2019, at the age of 80.

== Honors ==
Kingsley won Country Music Association National Broadcast Personality of the Year honors in 2001 and 2003. He received the 2012 President's Award from Country Radio Broadcasters. In November 2016, Kingsley was elected to the National Radio Hall of Fame. Blair Garner, Ralph Emery and Gene Autry were the only country radio personalities inducted before him.

The month after he died, a celebration was held in Kingsley's honor at the Country Music Hall of Fame; attendees included country music stars Garth Brooks, Dierks Bentley and Trisha Yearwood.
