= Don Bowman (singer) =

American country music singer-songwriter (1937–2013)

- Born: Rubel Don Bowman; August 26, 1937; Lubbock, Texas, U.S.
- Died: June 5, 2013 (aged 75)
- Genres: Country
- Occupations: Comedian, singer, songwriter
- Instrument: Vocals
- Years active: 1964–2007
- Label: RCA Victor

Rubel Don Bowman (August 26, 1937 – June 5, 2013) was an American country music singer, songwriter, comedian, and radio host. He recorded for RCA Victor between 1964 and 1970, charting in the Top 40 with the novelty hit single "Chit Akins, Make Me a Star". Bowman also worked at several radio stations, including KRZK in Branson, Missouri. At this time, he was also opening the show for Moe Bandy doing Seymore Miles. Bowman also worked at KDEO San Diego, KEWB Oakland, KDWB St. Paul, and KBBQ Burbank. He developed a fictional character for his radio shows named Gruesome Goodbody. In 1961 he had a country hit "Coward at the Alamo."

Bowman was born in Lubbock, Texas, and was the original host of the radio show American Country Countdown. He hosted the show from its inception on October 6, 1973, through April 1978, after which Bob Kingsley (who had been ACC's producer since 1974) took over as host. Also, Bowman filled in for Casey Kasem on the June 16, 1973 episode of American Top 40.

In 1966, Bowman won Favorite Country Comedy Recording of the Year award from Billboard. In 1967, he was named Comedian of the Year by the Country Music Association.

Bowman's song "Wildwood Weed" later became a hit for Jim Stafford, peaking at #7 on the Billboard Hot 100 in 1974.

Bowman died of liver and pancreatic cancer on June 5, 2013, at the age of 75. He had two children, Jackie and Casey Bowman.

== Discography ==
=== Albums ===
Year	Album	US Country	Label
1964	Our Man in Trouble	14	RCA Victor
1965	Fresh from the Funny Farm	—	RCA Victor
1966	Funny Way to Make an Album	14	RCA Victor
1967	Don Bowman Recorded Almost Live	36	RCA Victor
1967	From Mexico with Laughs featuring the Tijuana Drum and Bugle Corps	42	RCA Victor
1968	Funny Folk Flops	—	RCA Victor
1969	Support Your Local Prison	—	RCA Victor
1970	Whispering Country	—	RCA Victor
1972	All New	—	Mega
1979	Still Fighting Mental Health	—	Lone Star
1981	On the Road Too Long	—	Lone Star

=== Singles ===
Year	Single	Chart Positions		Album
Year	Single	US Country	CAN Country	Album
1964	"Chit Akins, Make Me a Star"	14	—	Our Man in Trouble
1966	"Giddyup Do-Nut"	49	—	single only
1966	"Surely Not"	73	—	Don Bowman Recorded Almost Live
1968	"Folsom Prison Blues #2"	74	—	Support Your Local Prison
1969	"Poor Old Ugly Gladys Jones" (with Bobby Bare, Waylon Jennings and Willie Nelson)	70	—	Support Your Local Prison
1972	"Hello D.J."	—	44	All New

=== Guest singles ===
Year	Single	Artist	Chart Positions	
Year	Single	Artist	US Country	CAN Country
1966	"For Loving You"	Skeeter Davis	72	18
1967	"Chet's Tune"	Some of Chet's Friends	38	—
