= KMAK =

- Orange Cove, California; United States
- Broadcast area: Fresno, California
- Frequency: 100.3 MHz
- Branding: Radio 100.3 La Unika Mexicana

Programming
- Language: Spanish
- Format: Regional Mexican

Ownership
- Owner: Richard B. Smith; (KMAK-FM, LLC)

History
- First air date: 1990

Technical information
- Licensing authority: FCC
- Facility ID: 56145
- Class: A
- ERP: 72 watts
- HAAT: 632 meters (2,073 ft)
- Transmitter coordinates: 36°44′45″N 119°16′58″W

Links
- Public license information: Public file; LMS
- Website: kmakfm.com

KMAK (100.3 FM, "La Unika Mexicana") is an radio station licensed to Orange Cove, California, United States. The station, established in 1990, is owned by founder Richard B. Smith and the license is held by KMAK-FM, LLC, a limited liability company wholly owned by Smith.

KMAK broadcasts a Spanish language Regional Mexican music format branded as "Radio 100.3 La Unika Mexicana" to the greater Fresno metropolitan area. The station had previously broadcast a similar format under the "La Favorita" branding.

== History ==
In June 1988, Richard B. Smith applied to the Federal Communications Commission (FCC) for a construction permit to build a new FM radio station. This station would broadcast on 100.3 MHz with 72 watts of effective radiated power from an antenna 632 meters (2,073 ft) in height above average terrain. The FCC granted this permit on March 10, 1989, with a scheduled expiration date of September 10, 1990.

The station was assigned the call sign "KMAK" by the FCC on March 23, 1989. Previously, this call sign had been assigned to Fresno-licensed 1340 AM (now KCBL), which featured now-legendary broadcasters Ron Jacobs and Robert W. Morgan in the mid-1960s, from its launch in 1953 until changing to "KKAM" in August 1988. KMAK Fresno sported a rather unique radio tower, with the call letters K-M-A-K displayed in large, red neon characters on the tower, which was near Fresno and McKinley Streets in the city.

After one extension to its construction permit, the station's broadcast license was granted by the FCC on December 26, 1990. The station's initial programming format was as a simulcast of the Christian programming of Merced-based KAMB (101.5 FM). By the late 2000s, the station had segued to its current Regional Mexican music format.

In May 2010, license holder Richard B. Smith applied to the FCC to transfer control of KMAK's broadcast license to KMAK-FM, LLC, a new limited liability company wholly owned by Smith. The FCC accepted this application on May 6, 2010, and approved the transfer on May 14, 2010. After resolving some paperwork in establishing the new company, Smith formally consummated the transfer on July 14, 2010.
