= Tom Rounds =

American broadcasting executive (1936–2014)

- Born: June 6, 1936; Stamford, Connecticut, U.S.
- Died: June 1, 2014 (aged 77); Los Angeles, California, U.S.
- Occupations: Radio broadcaster, DJ
- Known for: Co-creator of American Top 40, Pioneer rock festival promoter

Tom Rounds (June 6, 1936 – June 1, 2014) was an American radio broadcasting executive, founder and chief executive officer of Radio Express in Burbank, California.

== Biography ==
=== Early years ===
After first entering the broadcasting profession at the campus radio station of Amherst College in Massachusetts in the late 1950s, Rounds then worked at WINS (AM) in New York City as a newsman in 1959 before agreeing to travel to Honolulu with the station's general manager to work at station KPOI. While in Hawaii, Rounds—hoping to gain publicity for his new position as a disc jockey—set the world record for sleeplessness. The period of 260 hours awake was attained while Rounds was sitting in a department store window display. The record was broken in 1964 by San Diego high school student Randy Gardner. Rounds became a regional celebrity following the stunt, and eventually rose to lead the station as program director.

=== KFRC San Francisco ===
Ron Jacobs had been program director at KPOI before moving to KHJ in Los Angeles under influential radio programmer Bill Drake. Drake was seeking to install his signature Boss Radio format in the Bay Area in 1964; Jacobs recommended Tom Rounds for the position at KFRC in San Francisco. While at KFRC, Rounds began promoting large multi-act concerts to benefit charity and gain publicity for the station and the bands it featured. After holding the Beach Boys Summer Spectacular at the Cow Palace in 1966, Rounds and KFRC conceived of a large outdoor festival featuring a fair atmosphere similar to the popular Renaissance Pleasure Faire. The KFRC Fantasy Fair and Magic Mountain Music Festival was held in the second weekend of June 1967 at Mount Tamalpais State Park in Marin County, California, to support the Hunters Point Child Care Center. Featuring Jefferson Airplane, The 5th Dimension, The Doors and many other acts, it drew nearly 60,000 attendees. The Fantasy Fair produced by Rounds is considered the first rock festival in history, preceding the more well-known Monterey Pop Festival by one week.

Rounds left KFRC in the Fall of 1967; his decision to move beyond the restrictions of AM radio was documented on the front cover of the first issue of Rolling Stone magazine, with the headline "Tom Rounds Quits KFRC" on the upper right beside a large photograph of John Lennon.

=== Music video and rock festival pioneer ===
Upon resigning from KFRC, Rounds joined Amherst classmate Peter Gardiner in a new video production company based in Los Angeles called Charlatan Productions. The company is acknowledged as being among the first to focus exclusively on the use of cinematography and music together in the form that is now ubiquitous among major music acts, the music video. Rounds led the company to successfully produce several dozen "artist-promoting films" for acts such as Jimi Hendrix, Steppenwolf and The Animals, working with many record companies to produce the early videos.

The company also included Ron Jacobs, and with him Rounds continued to be involved with the promotion of large scale music events in markets associated with Bill Drake. In 1964, Rounds and Jacobs had joined with another Honolulu entertainment entrepreneur, Tom Moffatt, to form Arena Associates. This company was responsible for bringing mainland music acts to the newly built Blaisdell Center. Mel Lawrence, who had co-produced both the Fantasy Fair and the Monterey festival the following week was also involved with the company. Chief among the financial backers of Arena Associates was Tom Driscoll, heir of the family that owned the Driscoll's berry producing agricultural group. With the heavy backing of Driscoll, Rounds and Arena Associates produced several concerts. The most prominent of the events was the Miami Pop Festival, held in December 1968 at Gulfstream Park, a horse racing venue in South Florida. The festival, organized by Rounds, Lawrence, Jacobs, and a substantial promotional team, was hailed two weeks later in the New York Times as "a resounding success in both organization and programming, making it the first significant major pop festival held on the East Coast". Times reviewer Ellen Sander noted that the Miami festival truly represented the full spectrum of popular music acts, rather than relying on the presence of a few headlining acts to generate revenue.

=== Watermark and American Top 40 ===
Strawberry mogul Tom Driscoll was also involved in the formation of another of Rounds's businesses. In 1969, again with backing from Driscoll, Rounds and Jacobs formed Watermark Inc., a radio production and syndication company that created a variety of programs which it then distributed to radio stations throughout North America. The most widely recognized of the programs Rounds headed at Watermark was American Top 40, which featured the team of announcer Casey Kasem and producer Don Bustany. The program was popular in large markets and also allowed small market stations to present a three-hour national music chart countdown show at nominal cost that nevertheless produced good ratings and helped generate advertising revenue. The program reached audiences at over 500 radio stations in the United States by the 1980s. In 1990, Rounds announced the introduction of American Top 40 syndicated programming into the Soviet Union, adding that country to the list of seventy where the program was heard at the time. The show is still in syndication, hosted by Ryan Seacrest and distributed by Premiere Networks, a division of the American media conglomerate iHeartMedia.

=== Radio Express ===
After Watermark was absorbed into the American Broadcasting Company in the early 1980s as ABC Watermark, Rounds became responsible for the promotion and syndication of American Top 40 and other programs outside the United States. His independent company Radio Express was created in 1985 and currently produces and syndicates World Chart Shows hosted by Lara Scott and PJ Butta, among other programming. The company also handles syndication outside the US for American radio programs such as The Rick Dees Weekly Top 40 and American Country Countdown, as well as for major international special events such as the Live 8 and Live Earth concerts. Rounds continued to head the company, which claims on its website to have established relationships with over 5,000 radio stations in 140 countries, until his death following complications from surgery on June 1, 2014, at the age of 77, two weeks before the death of his former associate Casey Kasem.
