= Westwood One =

American radio network (under this name since 2013)

Westwood One, Inc.
- Type: Subsidiary
- Predecessor: Dial Global, X Radio Networks, Jones Media Group, Cumulus Media Networks
- Founded: 2006; 20 years ago
- Headquarters: Candler Building; New York City
- Area served: United States
- Key people: Suzanne M. Grimes (president)
- Parent: Independent (2006–2008); Triton Media Group (2008–2013); Cumulus Media (2013–present)
- Website: westwoodone.com

Westwood One, Inc., is an American radio network owned by Cumulus Media. The company syndicates talk, music, and sports programming.

The company takes its name from an earlier network also named Westwood One, a company founded in 1976. The company was, at various times, managed by CBS Radio, the radio arm of CBS Corporation and Viacom (both were subsumed into Skydance). It was later purchased by the private equity firm The Gores Group before merging with Dial Global in 2011. In December 2013, Dial Global was, in turn, acquired by Cumulus Media. Prior to the sale's completion, Dial Global re-assumed the Westwood One name. After the completion of the purchase, Westwood One was merged into the Cumulus Media Networks division (the former ABC Radio Networks).

Content syndicated by Westwood One includes talk shows, music programs and 24-hour formats. It is particularly prominent in sports radio, distributing Westwood One Sports and holding various play-by-play rights, including the National Football League's main radio package.

== History ==
Dial Global was founded as X Radio Networks, a division of Excelsior Radio Networks. It merged with Dial Communications and Global Media in 2006, from which it derived the Dial Global name. Dial Global initially specialized in syndicated weekend music programs of various types. In 2007 it acquired the former Transtar Radio Networks from the original Westwood One. Triton Media Group, a subsidiary of Oaktree Capital Management, purchased Excelsior in early 2008, and soon bought two of its three main competitors: Waitt Radio Networks and Jones Radio Networks. Triton used the Dial Global name for all of its programming and later bought the remainder of Westwood One in 2011, folding it into its Dial Global subsidiary.

Dial Global began exhibiting signs of financial distress in late 2012, a possible side effect of its numerous acquisitions. On November 15 of that year, Dial Global announced a disappointing third quarter that it attributed in part to the financial impact of its exposure to the controversy surrounding a certain controversial talk personality, which was widely assumed to be a veiled reference to Rush Limbaugh in the wake of the Rush Limbaugh–Sandra Fluke controversy (although Limbaugh has no direct association with Dial Global). It simultaneously announced that it had filed for delisting from NASDAQ. At the time of the announcement, Dial Global stock was trading at $2.00 a share; by mid-January 2013, DG's stock was trading at .30 a share. In a SEC 8-K filing dated January 15, 2013, DG announced that it had extended a loan waiver agreement with certain lenders.

On August 29, 2013, Cumulus Broadcasting announced its intent to acquire Dial Global for $260 million, and merge it into its existing Cumulus Media Networks division. To fund the sale, Cumulus sold 53 radio stations to Townsquare Media (a radio broadcasting company owned by Oaktree), and traded 15 more stations to Townsquare in exchange for a cluster in Fresno, California, formerly owned by Peak Broadcasting—which was also being acquired by Townsquare.

On September 4, 2013, ahead of the completion of the purchase, Dial Global announced that it would rename itself Westwood One, citing stronger name recognition. The sale was completed on December 12, 2013. As a result of all of these acquisitions, Cumulus Media now controls the remnants of all four of the major networks from the Golden Age of Radio: the former NBC Radio Network, the Mutual Broadcasting System, the distribution rights to most of CBS, the former ABC Radio Network, and CBS Sports Radio (CBS Radio owned stations, but were merged with Entercom on November 17, 2017; ABC, which still owns a few stations outside its original network primarily for ESPN Radio as of December 18, 2015, until 2023, pulled its content from Cumulus on January 1, 2015; and NBC, after having its content dropped from Westwood One in 2015, moved its content to iHeartMedia in 2016.) Among the numerous other holdings Cumulus now controls are the libraries of Transtar, RKO, Waitt, Jones, BPI, Watermark, and Drake-Chenault.

The company's numerous acquisitions prompted rival Talk Radio Network to file an antitrust lawsuit against what was then Dial Global in August 2012. Cumulus settled the lawsuit with TRN on amicable terms in March 2014, which was followed by TRN filing another lawsuit over the issue in April 2016. Cumulus won the lawsuit in late 2017, and TRN ceased operations at the end of that year.

By 2015, Westwood One had been fully integrated into Cumulus Media Networks, with Westwood One as the surviving brand. The merger resulted in layoffs from its Westwood One's facilities in Colorado, including some of its in-house airstaff (who would be offered vacant positions at Cumulus stations). The company stated that it planned to leverage talent from Cumulus's local stations (particularly in major markets) for its 24-hour formats.

Cumulus filed for Chapter 11 bankruptcy protection in November 2017. In January 2018, it began moving to terminate its broadcast contracts, including those through Westwood One. It emerged from bankruptcy protection in June 2018. Triton Media Group, by this point rebranded as Triton Digital, was spun off to The E. W. Scripps Company in October 2018; as Scripps does not operate radio stations (it had a brief foray in the medium after its acquisition of Journal Media Group, but divested its stations in 2018), the radio-related assets remain in the possession of Westwood One.

On March 5, 2026, Cumulus Media filed for Chapter 11 bankruptcy for the second time in nearly a decade, listing assets and liabilities between $1 billion and $10 billion.

=== Talk programming ===
- America in The Morning with John Trout (Airs live on weekdays 5-6 a.m. ET, ending September 18, 2026)
- The Chris Plante Show (9 a.m.-Noon)
- The Vince Show with Vince Coglianese (Noon-3 p.m.)
- The Bongino Report with Dan Bongino and Shawn Farash (PM edition, 3-6 p.m.; AM edition, 5-6 a.m. beginning September 21, 2026)
- The Mark Levin Show (6-9 p.m.)
- America at Night with McGraw Milhaven (9 p.m.-12 a.m.)
- Red Eye Radio with Eric Harley and Gary McNamara (1-5 a.m.)
- Meet the Press (Sundays)
- Real Estate Today from the National Association of Realtors (Weekends)

=== Sports programming ===
- Westwood One Sports
- NBC Sunday Night Football
- Triple Crown on NBC
- NFL on Westwood One Sports (Monday Night Football, Sunday Night Football, Thursday Night Football, Thanksgiving games and all playoff games)
- PGA Tour: The Masters and PGA Championship
- Tennis
  - Radio Roland Garros
  - AO Radio
- UFC Radio Network
- NCAA Radio Network
  - Football: regular season games, SEC Championship Game, Army–Navy Game, FCS Championship
  - Basketball: regular season games, conference championship week, NIT semifinals and finals, NCAA men's tournament (all games), NCAA women's tournament (Sweet 16, quarterfinals, semifinals and finals)
  - Other sports: College World Series (baseball), Women's College World Series (softball), men's lacrosse championship, women's lacrosse championship, Frozen Four (hockey), Women's Frozen Four (hockey)
- Soccer
  - United States Soccer Federation national teams
  - EFL Championship (in partnership with Talksport)
  - EFL Cup (in partnership with Talksport)
  - FA Cup (in partnership with Talksport)
  - Premier League (in partnership with Talksport)
  - La Liga
  - CONCACAF Champions League
  - CONCACAF Gold Cup
  - Westwood One FC
- Premier Boxing Champions

=== Music and entertainment programming ===
- The Adam Bomb Show
- 2Hours
- American Country Countdown
- Blair Garner Show
- The Bob and Sheri Show
- The Bob & Tom Show
- Café Mocha
- The Big Time with Whitney Allen
- Backtrax USA with Kid Kelly
  - (Only in the United States. International distribution is handled by Premiere Radio Networks.)
- The Hollywood 5
- Flashback
- The Lia Show
- Country Gold with Terri Clark
- Country Countdown USA
- Nash Nights with Shawn Parr
- Nightly with Jade & Tyler
- Nights with Elaina
- The Nighttime Radio Program with Bernie Mack
- Power Source Country
- The Lu Valentino Show
- Zach Sang and The Gang
- The Daly Download with Carson Daly
- The History of Rock & Roll (both the 1978 and 1981 versions are available)

=== News ===
- AP News
- CNBC Business Radio

=== Cumulus Podcast Network ===
Note: Westwood One handles sales and distribution rights for Cumulus podcast shows.

- The Dan Bongino Show (2015–2025, 2026–present)
- Scrolling with Hayley Caronia (2026–present)
- Insight with Chris Van Vliet
