= KKDD =

- San Bernardino, California; United States
- Broadcast area: Inland Empire
- Frequency: 1290 kHz
- Branding: Relevant Radio

Programming
- Format: Catholic radio
- Network: Relevant Radio

Ownership
- Owner: Relevant Radio, Inc.

History
- First air date: 1947
- Former call signs: KITO (1947–1962); KMEN (1962–1997); KMRZ (1997–1998)
- Call sign meaning: "Kids" (previous Children's radio format)

Technical information
- Licensing authority: FCC
- Facility ID: 10134
- Class: B
- Power: 5,000 watts
- Transmitter coordinates: 34°7′27″N 117°14′17.1″W

Links
- Public license information: Public file; LMS
- Webcast: Listen live
- Website: relevantradio.com

KKDD (1290 AM) is a radio station in San Bernardino, California. The station is owned by Relevant Radio, Inc. It airs a Catholic talk format for the Inland Empire region of Southern California including Riverside and San Bernardino.

== History ==
In 1947, the radio station first signed on as KITO, owned by the San Bernardino Broadcasting Company. It was a network affiliate of ABC, carrying its schedule of dramas, comedies, news, sports, soap operas and big band broadcasts during the Golden Age of Radio. In the 1950s, it changed its network affiliation to the Mutual Broadcasting System and Don Lee Network.

In 1962, the station was bought by Radio Associates, Inc., which switched it to a Top 40 sound as KMEN, known on the air as K/men 129. In the competitive Top 40 format, K/men 129 battled crosstown rival AM 590 KFXM (now KTIE) for youthful ratings. As Top 40 listening shifted to FM radio in the 1980s, KMEN tried a variety of formats, including middle of the road, oldies and talk. While the Las Vegas Raiders football team played in Los Angeles, KMEN was the Inland Empire affiliate.

In 1997, Chancellor Broadcasting, bought KMEN, flipping the format to adult standards. On September 18, 1998, The station call sign was changed to KKDD, which refers to Kids, and the station switched to a children's/contemporary hit radio format, featuring music and programming from the Radio Disney network. In 2000, Chancellor Broadcasting merged with Clear Channel Communications (now iHeartMedia).

On April 3, 2012, ERC Media signed a local marketing agreement (LMA) with Clear Channel, allowing the company to program the station with a mix of Contemporary Christian music and brokered religious teaching programs. During this time, the station's programming originated from the Orange County studios of 107.9 KWVE-FM, a longtime Christian radio station.

On April 11, 2014, ERC Media's LMA expired and Clear Channel resumed programming KKDD, this time with a Spanish-language adult hits format branded as "La Preciosa 1290."

On May 15, 2017, 1290 KKDD swapped formats with sister station KFNY in Riverside. 1290 KKDD became a talk station, while KFNY became "La Presciosa 1440."

On October 1, 2020, iHeartMedia and Immaculate Heart Media announced a swap in which KKDD, along with W292DH in Pittsburgh, would be acquired by Immaculate Heart in exchange for WZAB in Miami; the swap saw KKDD join the Relevant Radio network which broadcast Catholic oriented religious programming.
