= Dick Bartley =

American radio disc jockey

Dick Bartley (born July 26, 1951) is an American radio disc jockey. He has hosted several popular syndicated radio shows of the oldies/classic hits genre, including Dick Bartley's Classic Hits and Rock & Roll's Greatest Hits, both syndicated through United Stations Radio Networks.

From 1982 to 2017, he was host of a national Saturday night call-in request show — the original version of Rock & Roll's Greatest Hits from 1991 to 2017 — that aired live (until 2009, after which the program was pre-recorded); that program, along with the Classic Countdown, was combined into the new Classic Hits show. In February 2020, a new version of Rock & Roll's Greatest Hits, focused on 1960s music, was launched. The last airings of both of the syndicated shows occurred during the weekend of January 1-2, 2022.

Both Classic Countdown and Rock & Roll's Greatest Hits were syndicated through United Stations, and beforehand Westwood One (1982–1991) and ABC Radio Networks (1991–2009). Bartley has licensed his name for the "Dick Bartley Presents Collector's Essentials on the Radio" album series; compilations of radio favorites by specific era and genre. Bartley's programs use historic data from the Billboard Hot 100 and other charts.

Bartley got his start at age 17 playing "Bad Moon Rising" on radio station WWOD in Lynchburg, Virginia. WWOD, which hadn't been used for years, was finally razed and is now covered with grass on Mimosa Drive in Lynchburg.

== Programs ==
As was the case with his previous programs (at least in the 2010s), Dick Bartley's Classic Hits was four hours in length, until it shortened to three hours in length during the program's final year, and played classic hits and oldies from the 1970s and 1980s. Much in the same way the oldies and classic hits formats in general have done, his previous programs gradually shifted in their focus since their debuts; for instance, Rock & Roll's Greatest Hits, when it debuted in 1982 as "Solid Gold Saturday Night", had a playlist composed of titles almost entirely from the late 1950s through the late 1960s, mirroring the oldies format at the time. The focus of each show was different:

- The Classic Countdown focused on the hits of the current month from a particular year (in the mid 2010s, 1970-1987), although – like "Rock & Roll's Greatest Hits" – the program presented a "Halloween Classics" and "Summer Classics" show each year.
- Rock & Roll's Greatest Hits had a "spotlight" theme, presenting 12 to 16 examples interspersed throughout the program's four hours. Themes ranged from a particular year (the last years were 1973-1986) to top artists of the timeframe to stylistic trends and topics ("1980s Top Artists" or "Motown Classics"). As the show began started playing 1980s songs more extensively, a good share of the current playlist had not yet been recorded prior to 1982, when the show originally debuted. The program was originally a five-hour "live" program presented on Saturday evenings, but following its move to United Stations Radio Networks, became a four-hour pre-recorded program, with requests taken throughout the week; features of the formerly live show, including a contest to identify a clip of a song (often by a one-hit wonder), were dropped. While the show's focus was largely on music of the 1970s and 1980s, occasional hits from the 1960s and 1990s were played, particularly if they were part of Spotlight features or had enduring popularity. In February 2020, a new show with the title Rock & Roll's Greatest Hits debuted, focusing on music of the 1960s but otherwise identical in format to the concurrently running Dick Bartley's Classic Hits.
- The WCBS FM Sunday Night Countdown, heard only on WCBS FM 101.1, was a two-hour countdown, with bonus extras, for a year in the 1970s, followed by a two-hour countdown from ten years later (or ten years earlier if the 1970s countdown was from 1978 or 1979). Occasionally, if the 1970s countdown was from 1977, Bartley would then play one hour from 1987, followed by one hour from 1967. The last WCBS FM Sunday Night Countdown aired September 28, 2014.

Each program also had special weeks, usually the weekend before a major holiday:

- A Christmas format, heard the weekend of/before Christmas
- A "top requests/hits of all time"-type program, the weekend of/before New Years. This was either the biggest hits of particular years (in the oldies focus of the time) or the most requested hits from the previous 12 months.
- A "summertime" theme, the weekend of Memorial Day, with songs having the word "summer" in the title and/or having summer themes.
- A Halloween theme the weekend of/before Oct 31, with songs focusing either on the holiday or having supernatural themes.

During the 1990s, Bartley also hosted a third program, Yesterday Live, which featured a 1970s/1980s format similar to today's classic hits (at the time, his other shows were focused on 1950s and 1960s oldies).

In December 2021, United Stations Radio Networks, which had been distributing Bartley's shows since 2009, announced Bartley's retirement and the ending of syndication of Dick Bartley's Classic Hits and Rock & Roll's Greatest Hits. Both shows broadcast their final programs the weekend of January 1-2, 2022.

== Awards ==
- Three-time winner of the Billboard magazine Radio Award for Network Program of the Year: 1988, 1989, 1990
- Three-time nominee for the National Association of Broadcasters Marconi Award for Network Personality of the Year: 1992, 1993, 1995
- Winner of the 1996 New York International Radio Festival WorldMedal for The Beatles ’95 radio special
- Inducted into the National Radio Hall of Fame in Chicago, Illinois in 2000

== Personal life ==
Bartley was born in Schenectady, New York, and grew up in Lynchburg, Virginia, the son of William Bartley, an engineer at General Electric, and Nancy Bartley, who was a lay leader in the Christian Science Church. He and his wife, Cynthia, graduated from the University of Virginia and as of 2025 live in Falls Church, Virginia. He has two daughters, Diane Bartley and Jane Bartley. Diane graduated from Duke University. Jane graduated from Dartmouth.
