= Don Bustany =

American radio and television broadcaster (1928–2018)

Donald S. Bustany (August 10, 1928 – April 23, 2018) was an American radio and television broadcaster.

== Biography ==
Bustany was born in Detroit to Lebanese-American parents. He and radio host/voice actor Casey Kasem were childhood friends, and later co-creators of the syndicated radio programs American Top 40 and American Country Countdown.

In the 1970s, Bustany was camera coordinator of The Mary Tyler Moore Show, The Bob Newhart Show, and other MTM productions. Earlier he had produced local talk shows on several Los Angeles, California stations.

In 1973, Don married Judith Licata. The two met when Licata was working as an extra on the Mary Tyler Moore Show. They remained married until Judith's passing in 2015.

Don is survived by his stepdaughter, his nephew, and cousins.

== Education ==
Bustany graduated with a BA in Liberal Arts from Wayne State University and an MS in Communications from Syracuse University.

== Activism ==
Bustany was an activist for the Palestinian right of return. From 1996 until 2014, he produced and hosted the radio program Middle East in Focus on KPFK, the Los Angeles station of the Pacifica Radio network; he remained a correspondent to the program. The show's "mission is to fill the many gaps left by the mainstream media in their coverage" of the Middle East.

He was a member of the advisory committee of the American-Arab Anti-Discrimination Committee and, in the 1990s, served for four terms as president of the organization's Los Angeles chapter.

For his statements regarding the Zionist Movement and Israel, he had been criticized by such organizations as the JDL and the Zionist Organization of America. He was also a member of the board of directors of the Southern California Chapter of Americans for Democratic Action.

== Death ==
Bustany died on April 23, 2018, in Santa Barbara, California, aged 89.
