= American Country Countdown =

- Genre: Music chart show
- Running time: Approx. 3 hrs. and 55 mins. (including commercials)
- Country of origin: United States
- Language: English
- Home station: KPLX-FM
- Syndicates: Westwood One
- Hosted by: Don Bowman (1973–1978); Bob Kingsley (1978–2005); Kix Brooks (2006–2024); Ryan Fox (2025-present)
- Created by: Casey Kasem, Don Bustany, and Tom Rounds
- Original release: October 6, 1973 – present
- No. of episodes: Approximately 2,650
- Audio format: Stereophonic sound
- Website: americancountrycountdown.com

American Country Countdown, also known as ACC, is a weekly internationally syndicated radio program which counts down the top 30 country songs of the previous week, from No. 30 to No. 1, according to the Billboard Country Airplay chart. The program premiered in 1973 and as of January 2025 is hosted by Ryan Fox. It is syndicated by Westwood One.

== History ==
American Country Countdown was conceived as a spinoff program from American Top 40 (AT40), which had premiered in 1970 and showcased the week's most popular singles. The new program was a creation of Casey Kasem and Don Bustany, the same duo behind AT40, with Tom Rounds as co-creator and Watermark Inc. distributing. "In 1969, when Casey Kasem and I were planning 'American Top 40,' we said, 'Hey, if this works, we can do a country countdown, an MOR countdown, a whatever countdown,'" Rounds explained to Radio & Records magazine as to the show's conception. However, it was not until 1973 that the AT40 team thought there was sufficient support for a nationally syndicated program.

American Country Countdown launched nationwide on October 6, 1973. Like with its parent series, Billboard provided the chart information; in this case, the Hot Country Singles chart was used. Beginning in the late 2000s, the show used charts compiled by Mediabase, and in September 2017 it switched to using the Billboard Country Airplay chart.

Singer Don Bowman was the first host of the countdown, which was originally three hours long. Bustany was the producer, Hugh Cherry was the head writer, and Bowman was also a writer. There was editing help from Bustany, who was the head writer and producer of AT40.

In June 1974, Bustany stepped aside from his duties in order to focus on AT40 and tapped Bob Kingsley, who had been program director at country station KLAC-Los Angeles, to be ACC's producer. It was under Kingsley's watch that the program began to increase in popularity, as more and more stations picked up the countdown.

On May 6, 1978, Kingsley took on the added responsibility of hosting ACC. Don Bowman had not made any mention that he would be departing the program on the previous show; Kingsley informed the audience that Bowman had left the program to pursue other aspects of his career.

The show grew slowly, with fewer than 100 stations the first year before passing the 300-affiliate mark in 1980.

Beginning with the broadcast on January 11, 1986, ACC was expanded to four hours, adding several new features, including an "ACC Archives" feature (similar to one featured on American Top 40 several years earlier, with a chronological playback of No. 1 hits of the 1970s, and later, the 1980s) and an "ACC Calendar", spotlighting an artist, song, important innovation, or event in country music.

Kingsley hosted the program until December 2005, with his last show being a regular countdown airing Christmas weekend. Like Bowman before him, he never told the audience he would be leaving; in this instance, Kingsley was leaving to host the new Bob Kingsley's Country Top 40. After three weeks of substitute hosts, Kix Brooks of Brooks & Dunn assumed the hosting duties on January 21, 2006.

On November 25, 2024, Westwood One announced that Brooks would step down at the end of the year. Effective the weekend of January 4, 2025 Ryan Fox, morning DJ at Cumulus-owned KPLX in Dallas, will host the program.

== Awards ceremony ==
The Fox Network's awards ceremony, American Country Awards, which started in 2010, was cancelled and replaced by the American Country Countdown Awards in 2014.

The ratings for ACCA dropped dramatically compared to the 2013 American Country Awards. According to TV By The Numbers, 18-49 ratings/share dropped from 1.4/4 to 0.9/3 and viewership dropped from 5.14 million to 3.39 million.

== ACC specials ==
ACC broadcasts several special programs throughout the year. The most notable include:

- Christmas in America was a six-hour program aired within the week of Christmas Day, with interview clips from country singers sharing Christmas memories interspersed between songs. The first special aired in 1989. While the title and format continued with Bob Kingsley's Country Top 40 production, ACC's version continued as American Country Christmas, with Brooks being joined by Ronnie Dunn (from 2006 to 2008); the 2009 special consisted of Brooks interviewing country music artists. In 2010, clips of Brooks's interviews with students at elementary schools from across the country were included in addition to the artist interviews.
- The Year End Countdown. From 1973 to 1998, the year-end special reviewed the top 100 country hits of the year. The total was halved to 50 in 1979 and from 1999 to 2004, trimmed to 40 from 2005 to 2010, and cut to 30 starting in 2011 (with songs that "just missed" the top 30 played as extras). From 1978 through 2004, the most notable highlight was a montage of all the No. 1 songs included in the countdown's survey period (usually the previous November to the current November, although it has included early December for a time in the late 1980s) before Kingsley played the year's top song.

Other special programs, usually centering on a theme or to promote a much-anticipated album that was about to go on sale, air throughout the year. Past specials have paid homage to the West, presented unusual or notable chart facts and performer accomplishments, counted down the top acts of all time, profiled a performer, and presented the top female and male singers of the past decade.

== Reairing of older shows ==
In April 2015, Nash FM, the media brand and network of country music stations owned by Cumulus Media, announced it would begin re-airing classic ACC programs from the Kingsley era, starting the weekend of May 2. The show, featuring programs originally aired between 1990 and 2005, was three hours in length (for four-hour programs, the first hour wasn't included).

The first aired ACC Rewind program featured an ACC show which originally aired May 1, 1993. The final program, a re-airing of the 1999 year-end countdown, aired the weekend of December 28, 2019.

== Awards ==
ACC was named Billboard magazine's "Network/Syndicated Program of the Year: Country" from 1987 to 2002. Kingsley twice won the Country Music Association's National Broadcast Personality of the Year award (in 2001 and 2003).

== Worldwide syndication ==
When ACC premiered in October 1973, it aired on just 45 stations. Today, the show is heard on more than 1,000 radio stations in the United States and worldwide, and can be heard on the Armed Forces Radio Network. In the 1980s, 1990s and early 2000s, it aired in the United Kingdom and Ireland on Downtown Radio, Two Counties Radio, the medium wave service of Mercia Sound, Xtra AM, Scot FM, South East Radio in Wexford and Ritz Country 1035 in London.

ACC is produced and distributed by Cumulus Media Networks. Since 2007, the program has been distributed via Cumulus's "Today's Best Country" network and, since 2013, on most Nash FM stations as well. Tom Rounds's syndication company, Radio Express, distributes the program to radio stations outside the United States.
