= Watermark Inc. =

American radio syndication company

Watermark Inc. was a radio syndication company that was founded in 1969 by Tom Rounds and Ron Jacobs. Watermark's best known programs were American Top 40 and its spinoff American Country Countdown. Both shows were created by Casey Kasem and Don Bustany.

Watermark also syndicated other shows including The Robert W. Morgan Special of the Week, Alien Worlds, Soundtrack of the 60's (hosted by "Murray the K" from 1980 to 1981 and Gary Owens to series end), TV Tonite with Ron Hendren, Profiles in Rock (hosted by Terry McGovern), Ringo's Yellow Submarine, and The Elvis Presley Story, as well as occasional specials. The company also produced the "Cruisin'" series of albums, recreating top 40 disk jockey shows of the 1950s and 1960s and released on Increase Records (which at the time was a unit of Watermark), and Jack S. Margolis' comedy album, A Child's Garden of Grass, for Elektra Records.

In 1982 Watermark was bought by ABC Radio Networks in order to acquire its flagship shows AT40 and ACC. Watermark became a subdivision of ABC Radio and would continue to exist until 1995 when the original AT40 program ceased production. The last new Watermark program, American Gold, debuted in 1991 with Dick Bartley as host. American Gold ended its run in March 2009, when Bartley left ABC (by this time being dissolved into Citadel Media).
