= Country Top 40 with Fitz =

American country music radio countdown show

- Other names: Bob Kingsley's Country Top 40
- Genre: Music chart show
- Running time: Approx. 4 hours (including commercials)
- Country of origin: United States
- Language: English
- Syndicates: Jones Radio Networks (2006–09); Dial Global (2009–13); Westwood One (2013–2019); Skyview Networks (2020-Present)
- Hosted by: Fitz
- Created by: Bob Kingsley
- Original release: January 1, 2006 – present
- Website: Official Website

Country Top 40 with Fitz (sometimes abbreviated as CT40), formerly known as Bob Kingsley's Country Top 40, is an American country music radio countdown show. It was created by former American Country Countdown host Bob Kingsley, who hosted the show from its January 2006 debut until shortly before his death in 2019. Currently hosted by Fitz, the program is distributed by Skyview Networks and produced as a joint venture between Hubbard Broadcasting and KCCS Productions, the holding company operated by Kingsley's widow. It uses the Mediabase Country Singles chart as its source. The program is syndicated to more than 200 radio stations in the United States and Canada.

== History ==
Prior to the inception of Country Top 40 in 2005, radio host Bob Kingsley was the host of American Country Countdown, a Top 40 country music countdown show based on the Billboard Hot Country Songs chart. Country Top 40 first aired January 1, 2006, on 300 affiliates, three weeks before Kix Brooks of the country music duo Brooks & Dunn took over as host of American Country Countdown. Until 2013 it was distributed by Dial Global Radio Networks; with Cumulus Media's purchase of Dial Global, along with its purchase of ACC's network in 2011, both shows came under the same corporate umbrella.

On October 9, 2019, Kingsley announced his departure from the show to undergo treatment for bladder cancer, hoping to return if his health permitted. In the interim, he formed an agreement with the Country Music Association to provide guest hosts for the program, all of whom would be women, through the November 30 - December 1, 2019 episode. Kingsley died October 17, a week after the announcement.

On December 18, 2019, it was announced that radio personality Fitz, host of The Fitz Show, The Hit List with Fitz, and Nashville Minute with Fitz, would succeed Kingsley as host starting with the January 4, 2020, show, with the blessing of Kingsley's widow Nan. Hubbard Broadcasting, Fitz's employer, is now CT40's production company, and Skyview Networks has taken over as distributor from Westwood One.

== Content ==
Country Top 40 is a four-hour show based on the country singles charts tabulated by Mediabase. At the beginning of each show from its inception in 2006 until 2017, Kingsley played back snippets of the previous week's top 5 hits, ending with the #1 song from the previous week. Beginning with the May 20–21, 2017 program, however, he started the show by playing in full the #1 song from the previous week. (It had been his practice when he hosted American Country Countdown beginning in 1986 when ACC went from a three-hour to a four-hour program.) The countdown itself features the top 40 country songs of the week, played in ascending order starting with #40 and ending with #1. Each segment includes from two to four songs, with at least one of those songs having a story about the song or its recording artist; some songs are also accompanied by interview snippets from the artist. In addition, some of the songs are followed by a previous hit from the artist.

Regular and recurring features of the show include:

- The Listener Request, heard at the end of the first hour. Similar to the ACC Mailbag of Kingsley-era American Country Countdown shows (which, in turn, was based on the Long Distance Dedication of AT40), listeners are invited to send requests (by e-mail or letter) for songs and provide a story about the song's meaning to them. If a request is played on the program, that listener receives a gift package (generally, a T-shirt and a copy of that particular show).
- CT40 Vault, heard at the end of the second hour. "A walk down the hall to the vault for a sampling of country music history" by spotlighting clips of songs from past decades, and ending with the playing of a song in its entirety (i.e. #1 from this week 48 years ago, 28 years ago, 18 years ago, 8 years ago). This feature was likely inspired by a similar feature that was short lived on American Top 40 in the mid-1980s.
- CT40 Milestone, heard at the end of the third hour. Like "ACC Calendar" from Kingsley-era American Country Countdown programs, "Milestone" spotlights a classic song, birthday of a performer or songwriter, or other innovation in country music history.
