= KIQQ-FM =

Radio station in Newberry Springs, California

- Newberry Springs, California; United States
- Broadcast area: Barstow, California
- Frequency: 103.7 MHz
- Branding: La Mejor 101.7 FM y 103.7 FM

Programming
- Format: Regional Mexican

Ownership
- Owner: Lazer Media; (Lazer Licenses, LLC)
- Sister stations: KBTW

History
- Former call signs: KAWU (1997–2000)

Technical information
- Licensing authority: FCC
- Facility ID: 79388
- Class: A
- ERP: 6,000 watts
- HAAT: 86.0 meters (282.2 ft)
- Transmitter coordinates: 34°53′7″N 116°53′45″W

Links
- Public license information: Public file; LMS
- Website: lamejornetwork.com/victor-valley/

KIQQ-FM (103.7 MHz) is a radio station that is licensed to Newberry Springs, California and serves the Barstow area. The station is owned by Lazer Media and broadcasts a regional Mexican music format.

The station signed on in January 2001 by Moon Broadcasting with a regional Mexican format.

The KIQQ call letters were previously held by a station at 100.3 FM in Los Angeles (now KKLQ) from 1972 to 1989, branded as "K-100". Programmed by Bill Drake, the top 40-formatted station featured noted personalities from KHJ's "Boss Radio" era, including The Real Don Steele, Robert W. Morgan, Eric Chase, and Jerry Butler. It is simulcast on KXSB, which serves the San Bernardino area.
