= Cruisin' (sampler series) =

Compilation album by various artists
- Released: 1955-1970, 1980s, 1993
- Genre: Rock and roll, pop
- Label: Increase Records

Cruisin' was an American rock and roll and pop music sampler series covering the years 1955-1970. It was released by Increase Records, originally in 1970 and 1972 on vinyl, 8-Track, and Cassette (years 1955 to 1963) with later years being released in 1986 (cassette), and in 1996 on CD and cassette tape again.

Each album of the series purported to be an authentic, roughly 40-minutes recreation of a contemporary radio station from that year, complete with year-appropriate ads, station jingles, and an original radio DJ from that era introducing each song, reading out local news, and inviting the listeners to join in competitions.

== Artistic contributions ==
The cover of each record consisted of a faux romance comics panel illustrated by comic book artist Mike Royer, with Paul Gruwell serving as the series' art director from 1970 until 1972. When viewed in sequence, these panels collectively narrated the story of a young girl and boy navigating their teenage years. Royer's covers depicted scenes and characters that resonated with the cultural zeitgeist of the 1950s and 1960s, often romanticizing youth culture.

In a three-part interview conducted in 2018, Royer shared that his approach involved meticulous research to ensure historical accuracy and cultural authenticity. He carefully balanced the vibrant storytelling techniques typical of romance comics with visual elements that evoked the musical themes of each album. According to Royer, the directive came from Paul Gruwell, but he was given significant creative freedom to interpret the themes visually.

Royer also addressed misconceptions about the production process. Contrary to some earlier accounts that minimized his role, he clarified that the artwork required extensive planning and was integral to the success of the series.

== Cultural impact ==
The "Cruisin’" series became a cult favorite among fans of classic rock and roll. Its unique blend of music, authentic DJ commentary, and era-appropriate advertisements offered listeners a time capsule experience. Royer's illustrations contributed to the series' popularity by visually capturing the spirit of the 1950s and 1960s, often drawing attention from both music enthusiasts and comic art collectors.

In his interviews, Royer reflected on the enduring appeal of the series, noting that it provided a “tangible connection to a bygone era." His contributions have since been celebrated as an integral part of the "Cruisin’" legacy, with fans appreciating how the artwork enhanced the listening experience.

Title	Date Released	Radio Personality	City	Station
Cruisin' 55	January 1972	George Oxford	San Francisco	KSAN
Cruisin' 56	June 1970	Robin Seymour	Detroit	WKMH
Cruisin' 57	June 1970	Joe Niagara	Philadelphia	WIBG
Cruisin' 58	June 1970	Jack Carney	St. Louis	WIL
Cruisin' 59	June 1970	Hunter Hancock	Los Angeles	KGFJ
Cruisin' 60	June 1970	Dick Biondi	Buffalo	WKBW
Cruisin' 61	June 1970	Arnie Ginsburg	Boston	WMEX
Cruisin' 62	June 1970	Russ Knight	Dallas	KLIF
Cruisin' 63	January 1972	B. Mitchel Reed	New York City	WMCA
Cruisin' 64	September 1973	Johnny Holliday	Cleveland	WHK
Cruisin' 65	September 1973	Robert W. Morgan	Los Angeles	KHJ
Cruisin' 66	September 1973	Pat O'Day	Seattle	KJR
Cruisin' 67	September 1973	Dr. Don Rose	Atlanta	WQXI
Cruisin' 68	September 1986	Johnny Dark	Baltimore	WCAO
Cruisin' 69	September 1986	Harve Moore	Washington	WPGC
Cruisin' 70	September 1986	Kris Eric Stevens	Chicago	WLS
