= "Shotgun Tom" Kelly =

American radio and TV personality (born 1949)

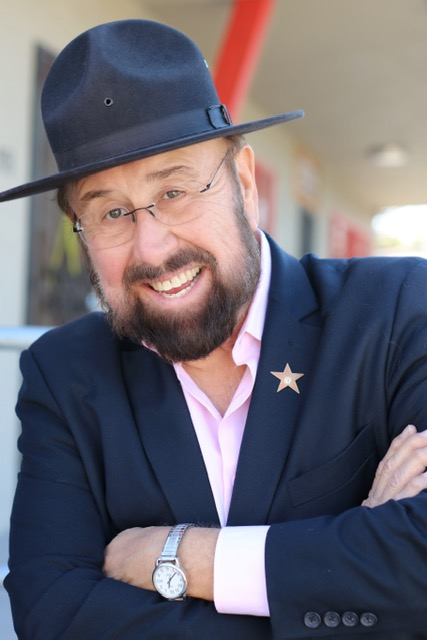
- Kelly in 2019
- Born: Thomas Joseph Irwin; August 8, 1949 (age 77); San Diego, California, U.S.
- Other name: Bobby "Shotgun" McAllister
- Occupations: Radio personality, television host
- Presenting career
- Station: Sirius XM Satellite Radio
- Previous show: San Diego Film Awards
- Website: www.shotguntomkelly.com

Thomas Joseph Irwin (born August 8, 1949), known professionally as "Shotgun Tom" Kelly, is an American radio and television personality. He is a two-time Emmy award winner, Billboard Air Personality of the Year winner, an inductee into the California Music Hall of Fame (2023) and recipient of a star on the Hollywood Walk of Fame.

Born in San Diego, Kelly worked at KDEO, KPRI, KGB, KCBQ, KOGO KBZS and KFMB-FM before replacing the late Don Steele in the afternoon slot at Los Angeles oldies station KRTH-FM, K-Earth 101. In August 2015, he was taken off the air and became KRTH's "Ambassador," doing personal appearances throughout Southern California. He eventually returned to the air as a weekend host and exited KRTH in November 2016. In September 2018, he debuted and continues on SiriusXM Satellite Radio's current '60s Gold channel.

== Early life ==
Thomas Joseph Irwin was born in San Diego, California at Mercy Hospital, also spending his childhood years in San Diego. He attended Our Lady of the Sacred Heart and Saint John of the Cross parochial schools for his elementary years. He attended Mount Miguel High School and was the announcer for the morning bulletin. In high school, he joined Junior Achievement which had a radio show on KOGO.

At ten, his mother, La Von Irwin (née Driscoll), mentioned to Kelly that there was a disc jockey doing a radio show in a shopping center in Lemon Grove, California. The disc jockey was Frank Thompson on KOGO-AM, who saw the young Kelly looking through the window and interviewed him on the air. Following that experience, Kelly became fascinated with radio shows, even putting together his own mock radio studio in his bedroom.

A few years later, 13 year-old Kelly went to other radio stations and watched the disc jockeys on the air. He visited Radio KDEO where he met program director "Sunny Jim" Price, who wanted to get a teenager's opinion of a song he was considering adding to the playlist. Price played the song for Kelly, who liked it. The song was "California Dreamin'" by The Mamas & The Papas. Radio KDEO was the first station in the country to play it. Price gave him his first job at a radio station helping with remote broadcasts.

== Early career – 1960s ==
In 1966, at the age of 16, Kelly was hired by Program Director George Manning to work on Sunday mornings at KPRI-FM 106.5 in San Diego, playing "beautiful music" and standards. Every Sunday morning, he also did a children's radio show, "The Uncle Tommy Show", and played recordings from Disney Records. After high school, he attended the William B. Ogden Radio Operational Engineering school. He graduated in 1969 with his FCC First Class radio license and went to work at KYOS in Merced, California.

== 1970s ==
At 21, Kelly worked at KACY in Port Hueneme, California using the name Bobby McAllister. There, he met DJ Dave Conley who named him Bobby "Shotgun" McAllister. Less than a year later, he and Dave moved to radio station KAFY in Bakersfield, California playing music "standards". Kelly wanted to use his real name, but the general manager did not like the name Irwin, and asked him to change his last name on the air to Kelly. Dave Conley suggested the name "Shotgun," from Bobby "Shotgun" McAllister, and they ended up using the name "Shotgun Tom" Kelly. In addition to radio, Kelly took a weekend job at television station KERO, and did a television kid's show as NEMO the Clown.

In 1971, Kelly was offered an opportunity to return to San Diego when Charlie Van Dyke hired him at Boss Radio 136/KGB. Less than a year later, he was hired by Buzz Bennett to work at KCBQ. In 1972 he returned to 136/KGB.

Shortly thereafter, he joined Buzz Bennett for a job at KRIZ in Phoenix. He returned to San Diego and was on air weekday afternoons at KCBQ. It was while at KCBQ that Kelly started wearing his trademark ranger hat.

During this time, he was asked to host the kids' TV game show "Words-A-Poppin" airing on KGTV Channel 10 in San Diego, and syndicated to other cities. He won an Emmy for Words-A-Poppin' that same year.

In 1976, Kelly hosted a local television show in San Diego called, "Disco 10," which aired on KGTV on Saturdays at 12:30pm. As they would on the more popular, nationally syndicated, "American Bandstand", local high school kids would dance on Disco 10, then get to watch themselves on television at a later date.

In 1976, Kelly was hired by Bobby Rich to be the morning man at KFMB-FM, known as "B-100". He won the 1976 Billboard Magazine Air Personality of the Year Award and remained at B-100 for the next four years. In 1978, he won a second Emmy for Words-A-Poppin'.

== 1980s ==
While at B100, Kelly was offered a position at KUSI-TV as a booth announcer/on camera children's TV host with cartoons on The KUSI Kids Club. He hosted the KUSI Kids Club for 12 years.

In November 1987, Congressman Duncan Hunter invited Kelly to the White House to meet President Ronald Reagan. While visiting, he presented the President with one of his trademark ranger hats, which President Reagan donned for a photo op.

In 1989, Mark Larson hired Kelly at KFMB-AM to do a radio show from David Cohn's Corvette Diner in Hillcrest and at The T-Bird Diner in Escondido.

== 1990s ==
In 1993, Kelly was hired to work at KBZT K-Best-95 in San Diego. In September 1997, he was hired to succeed the late Real Don Steele and work in afternoon drive at KRTH K-Earth 101.

== 2000s ==
On August 28, 2010, Kelly hosted the dedication of a monument at the former site of the KCBQ building and its six, 200-foot towers. The event was attended by over 400 of the radio station's fans and former on-air personalities.

== 2020s ==
On April 4, 2026, Kelly was inducted into the California American Entertainment Hall of Fame, along with Verdine White, Wimberley Bluegrass Band, and Cannibal and the Headhunters.

== Television ==
Kelly has appeared on several television stations since the early 1970s. In 1970, he took a weekend job at television station KERO, Bakersfield to host a Saturday morning television kids show as NEMO the Clown. In 1972, he was asked to host Words-A'Poppin', a game show for kids. The show aired in San Diego on KGTV Channel 10, and was also syndicated in several other cities. Kelly went on to win two Emmy Awards as host for the show.

That same year, Kelly was invited to host the Jerry Lewis MDA Telethon and he would serve as its host for more than 30 years. In 1982, he was offered a position at KUSI-TV as a booth announcer and on-camera host for The KUSI Kids Club. Tom would continue as host of the show for 12 years. He has also served as station announcer for WFLX-TV FOX 29 in West Palm Beach, Florida.

Kelly has also appeared on the Southern California-centric show Storage Wars.

== Voice over ==
Kelly's voice is featured in the motion picture Déjà Vu, starring Denzel Washington and on America's Most Wanted and Spike TV's 1000 Ways to Die.

He also did voice work for his hometown San Diego Chargers and his voice could be heard on the Jumbotron during Chargers home games.

Kelly is heard on Fred Falke's song "Radio Days".

== Hollywood Walk of Fame ==
On April 30, 2013, Kelly was honored with a Star on the Hollywood Walk of Fame. His star is located adjacent to another K-Earth personality, The Real Don Steele.
