= Charlie Van Dyke =

American actor

Charlie Van Dyke (born Charles Leo Steinle; July 26, 1947) is a former radio disc jockey who is best known for his voice work on radio and television stations. He is recognized by his deep, booming voice.

Originally from Dallas, Van Dyke was working in major-market Top 40 radio, at local powerhouse KLIF, by the time he was 19. Bill Drake brought Van Dyke to his stable of stations, first in morning drive at CKLW in Windsor in 1968 and 1969, then to KFRC in San Francisco where he did morning drive in 1969 and 1970. Van Dyke later did mid-days, and eventually mornings, and was program director at Drake's "flagship", KHJ in Los Angeles. Other stops included WLS Chicago, and WRKO Boston.

Van Dyke's spoken-word record "The Flag" charted nationally, peaking at #116 in the Record World survey of June–July 1976. He appears as the narrator on Albert Brooks's second comedy album, A Star Is Bought (1975), which includes "Phone Call to Americans," a parody of patriotic spoken-word records.

Throughout most of the 1980s, he was a frequent guest host on American Top 40. He sub-hosted on 31 shows in all, including the first regular episodes from 1983 to 1988. He also served as the show's announcer until 1988.

In the 1990s, he worked in radio from his home in Phoenix, Arizona. From 1998 to 2000, Van Dyke succeeded Robert W. Morgan in morning drive at KRTH in Los Angeles. He continues to work as a voice talent for television and radio stations, including KUSI-TV in San Diego, WABC-TV in New York City, KABC-TV in Los Angeles, and WVUE-DT in New Orleans. He previously worked for WOWT in Omaha, WBAL-TV in Baltimore, KPNX in Phoenix, WSB-TV in Atlanta, WUSA in Washington, D.C., WTVJ in Miami, WCNC-TV and WBTV in Charlotte, WTVT and WFTS-TV in Tampa/St Petersburg, WPTV-TV in West Palm Beach, WVTM-TV and WBRC in Birmingham, WAVE in Louisville, WJBK in Detroit, WTVD in Durham, KPRC-TV in Houston, KDFW in Dallas/Fort Worth, WPVI-TV in Philadelphia, and WAVY-TV in Hampton Roads.

In November 2017, Van Dyke became the imaging voice of Educational Media Foundation's K-Love contemporary Christian music network, which is heard on more than 450 stations nationwide.

In 2011, Van Dyke's son Christopher "Brotha' Fred" Frederick joined WKSC-FM in Chicago as a morning personality.
