= Gary Bryan =

American radio disc jockey (born 1952)

- Born: January 15, 1952 (age 74); Philadelphia, Pennsylvania, U.S.
- Spouse: June
- Children: 4
- Presenting career
- Station: KRTH
- Time slot: 5am-10am (Monday-Friday)
- Country: United States

Gary Bryan (born January 15, 1952) is an American radio DJ, currently on the air in Los Angeles, California at KRTH (K-Earth 101). With more than 30 years in broadcasting, Bryan's career includes major-market program director and morning show duties, serving as host and producer of several syndicated programs, and ventures online and in television.

== Career ==
=== Early years ===
At age 17, while visiting family near Augusta, Georgia, Gary Bryan heard a horrible broadcaster and believed he could do a better job as a radio personality. He met with the station manager at WTWA in Thomson, Georgia and began working the following day.

Bryan is a veteran broadcaster, having served as program director at such stations as KKRZ (Z100) in Portland, Oregon, which he put on the air in 1984, and KUBE in his hometown of Seattle. Under his guidance, KUBE achieved all-time record FM ratings for the Seattle market in 1988. Bryan programmed ABC Radio's flagship FM station in New York City, WPLJ, while also serving as morning host. He then shifted his focus exclusively to performing morning hosting duties, appearing on-air at WHTZ in New York, the most-listened-to station in the United States at the time, and KFRC in San Francisco.

In early 1995, while at KFRC, Bryan drew national attention and controversy when he rewrote "Iko Iko" into a parody called "Ito Ito", mocking Lance Ito, the judge presiding over the O.J. Simpson murder trial. After protests by several interest groups, Bryan was brought up on charges before the city of San Francisco's Human Rights Commission. He was found "guilty" but, as Bryan told the press, "they recommended I be demoted and take a cut in pay. Fortunately, they have no authority, so I told them to screw off".

Bryan made his first feature film appearance in Metro, a 1997 release starring Eddie Murphy.

In 1998, Bryan assumed morning host duties on KJR-FM in Seattle.

=== K-Earth 101 ===
Bryan joined the staff of KRTH (K-Earth 101) in Los Angeles in June 2002 and began hosting the morning show. He moved to afternoon drive in February 2005 and returned to the morning shift in May 2006.

From May 2003 to October 2008, Bryan and KRTH raised more than $1 million in support of the Bob Hope Hollywood USO at LAX through three radiothons, a golf tournament, and a raffle featuring a Jeep Wrangler customized by Jesse James.

In July 2008, Bryan announced a joint venture with Blueprint Entertainment, a Canadian television company, to produce a TV show highlighting selected morning shows from radio stations throughout the country.

Bryan is currently partnering with Lou Pizarro from Operation Repo and EGA Productions to develop reality TV concepts for cable and video streaming. He also produces a podcast called Mobshot featuring former mafia tough-guy Vince Ciacci.

In addition to hosting the K-Earth 101 morning show, Bryan serves as the announcer on the annual Creative Arts Emmy Awards.

== Rewind with Gary Bryan ==
Rewind with Gary Bryan is a weekly nationally syndicated radio program hosted by Gary Bryan. Originally an oldies-oriented show, it has shifted to a classic hits format centered on music from the 1960s, 1970s, 1980s, and 1990s. The show, originating from KRTH, is produced through Bryan's production company, Radio Genius Productions, LLC and syndicated via United Stations Radio Networks.

In 2009, Rewind combined its production efforts and affiliate network with those of oldies program Dick Clark's Rock, Roll & Remember, which was also distributed by United Stations. The show became known as Dick Clark Presents Rewind with Gary Bryan for several years before dropping Clark's name and adjusting its format from oldies to classic hits.

== Awards and honors ==
Bryan was named a "Legend of Radio" at the National Association of Broadcasters convention in Seattle, Washington, in 1998.

He was named "Patriot of the Year" by the Bob Hope Hollywood USO in June 2005.

== Personal life ==
Bryan's birth date is January 15. Born at the Navy Hospital in Philadelphia, Bryan grew up as Navy brat, moving around the country with his family. By the time he graduated high school, Bryan had lived in Philadelphia, Washington, DC, Norfolk, Virginia, Bath, Maine, San Diego, Los Angeles and Gray, Georgia. He graduated from Cascade High School in Everett, Washington.

He has been married since the age of 19 to his wife, June. They have 4 children, Jack, Kate, Marie and Grace and 4 grandchildren, Eva, Jesse, Zoey and John.
