= The Groovy Show =

- Genre: Dance/Variety
- Presented by: Michael Blodgett, Sam Riddle & Kam Nelson, and Robert W. Morgan
- Country of origin: United States
- Original language: English
- No. of seasons: 3

Original release
- Network: KHJ-TV
- Release: 1967 – 1970

The Groovy Show is an American half-hour live dance program that aired on weekday afternoons on KHJ-TV Channel 9, in the Los Angeles, California market from 1967 to 1970.

== Overview ==
The program was broadcast from the beach in Santa Monica, California, near the pier. During the winter the program moved inland to various parks around the Southland. There were three iterations of the show. The first, the on-location version from the beach and parks was hosted by actor Michael Blodgett, who was usually shirtless to show off his physique. In addition to dancing and musical guests, the show also featured bikini contests and pie fights. Blodgett left the show within a year to pursue his acting career which included a role in Russ Meyer's Beyond the Valley of the Dolls.

The second version of the show was The Groovy Game hosted by sister radio station KHJ DJ Sam Riddle and model Kam Nelson (who dated and later became engaged to Olympic pole vaulter Bob Seagren during their run). It included a game show component in which selected members of the audience competed in a trivia contest for prizes. One of the games was called "The Generation Gap", where a teenager and an adult (usually a parent but it could be another adult, such as the principal of the high school the teenager attended) would each be asked three questions—the teenager would be asked questions the adult would easily know but would likely challenge a teenager; the adult would be asked a question teenagers would know but would likely stump an adult. If they answered all questions correctly, they won a prize.

In 1968, the show was renamed The Groovy Show and became a live in-studio teen dance program. Both Sam Riddle and Kam Nelson remained to co-host the show. Possibly as a local example of a comely young California woman who was recognizable in the Los Angeles market through her appearances on The Groovy Show, Kam Nelson would be featured in the opening credits of the 1970s Lloyd Haynes television program Room 222.

The third iteration of the show was also hosted by a KHJ disc jockey Robert W. Morgan. Morgan's program dropped the teen dance format and became more of a talk and performance show. One unique feature was the booth in which dancers got "Morganized", presumably a fun-house "whoopee" floor experience. When Morgan heard singer-songwriter John Stewart's song "California Bloodlines" on the radio early into his hosting duties (no doubt, on KHJ where the song was in the top 30 in Los Angeles at the time), he asked his producer Judi to find the singer. She did, and Morgan asked Stewart to join the show for the 26-week contracted period. Stewart performed on the show with his then-backup group which consisted of singer Buffy Ford (who later became his wife), future rock photographer Henry Diltz, fiddle player Chris Darrow, and drummer Russ Kunkel. Given carte blanche and with little direction, the show at times was a free-for-all, Stewart and Morgan later admitted, on one occasion having a "shootout" with hand-held hair dryers. By now the show could be viewed as either a wild, off-the-cuff early version of Monty Python or Benny Hill or one that had run its course. In either event, the Morgan iteration was the show's last, and it soon disappeared from the airwaves, not to be forgotten by legions of Baby Boomers who came of age in Southern California during the program's run. At least one videotape copy of an October 30, 1969 broadcast exists with Stewart and his group performing "California Bloodlines". Others may be and are likely to exist in the CBS tape library, successor to the KHJ-owned program.
