= WTWA =

- Thomson, Georgia; United States
- Broadcast area: Augusta metropolitan area
- Frequency: 1240 kHz
- Branding: WTWA FM 104.9 & AM 1240

Programming
- Format: Oldies

Ownership
- Owner: Camellia City Communications, Inc.
- Sister stations: WTHO-FM

History
- First air date: January 10, 1948

Technical information
- Licensing authority: FCC
- Facility ID: 8476
- Class: C
- Power: 600 watts
- Transmitter coordinates: 33°28′20″N 82°31′02″W
- Translator: 104.9 W285EP (Thomson)

Links
- Public license information: Public file; LMS
- Webcast: Listen live
- Website: www.wtho.com

WTWA (1240 kHz) is a commercial AM radio station licensed to Thomson, Georgia, and broadcasting to the Augusta metropolitan area. It airs an oldies radio format and is owned by Camellia City Communications, Inc. The studios and offices are on Cedar Rock Road in Thomson. Most songs were hits in the 1960s and 70s. Weekdays at 12:40 and 5:40 p.m., WTWA hosts a swap shop program.

WTWA is powered at 600 watts non-directional. Programming is also heard on 250-watt FM translator W285EP at 104.9 MHz.

== History ==
WTWA signed on the air on January 10, 1948. The WTWA call sign was chosen for the communities served by the station, standing for "Washington-Thomson-Warrenton-Area". It was built and co-owned by Walter J. Brown of Spartanburg, South Carolina. Brown owned and operated WORD 950 AM there. Brown's partner and general manager in WTWA was Edgar J. Kobak, former president of the Mutual Broadcasting System. WTWA was a Mutual network affiliate from the day it signed on until the network went silent.

When WTWA debuted, Thomson, Georgia. was the smallest American town in population size to have a radio station. Broadcasting magazine described WTWA as "an experiment in small-station operation which may indicate whether local stations can survive in county seats of about 5,000 population." Brown sold his interest in WTWA to Kobak in 1950.

In 1953, Kobak bought the local McDuffie Progress newspaper, combined it with the radio station and promoted Frank Hash, the editor of the newspaper, to be WTWA's manager. Hash then bought the newspaper and radio station in 1957. In 1962, Gene Harden, WTWA's longtime manager, bought the station from Hash.

In an unusual turn of events, Harden sold WTWA to its founder, Walter Brown, in 1977. Brown, by then longtime owner of WSPA-AM/FM/TV in Spartanburg, had returned to radio ownership in Thomson, building WTHO-AM/FM in 1972. WTHO-AM was a daytime-only station at 1530 on the dial, inferior to WTWA's 1,000 full-time facility at 1240. Upon his purchase of WTWA, Brown sent the 1530 license to the FCC for cancellation, and transferred some of its programming to WTWA.

The station has produced such local programming as 1st National Bank News, with newscaster Lee Shepard, in 1948. Alumni of the station include veteran broadcaster Gary Bryan, later at WHTZ New York City and KRTH Los Angeles. Bryan started at WTWA when he was only 17 years old.

== Translators ==
In addition to the main station, WTWA is relayed by an additional translator to widen its broadcast area.

Call sign	Frequency	City of license	FID	ERP (W)	Class	FCC info
W285EP	104.9 FM	Thomson, Georgia	151804	250	D	LMS
