= Veronica Blume =

Spanish actor and model

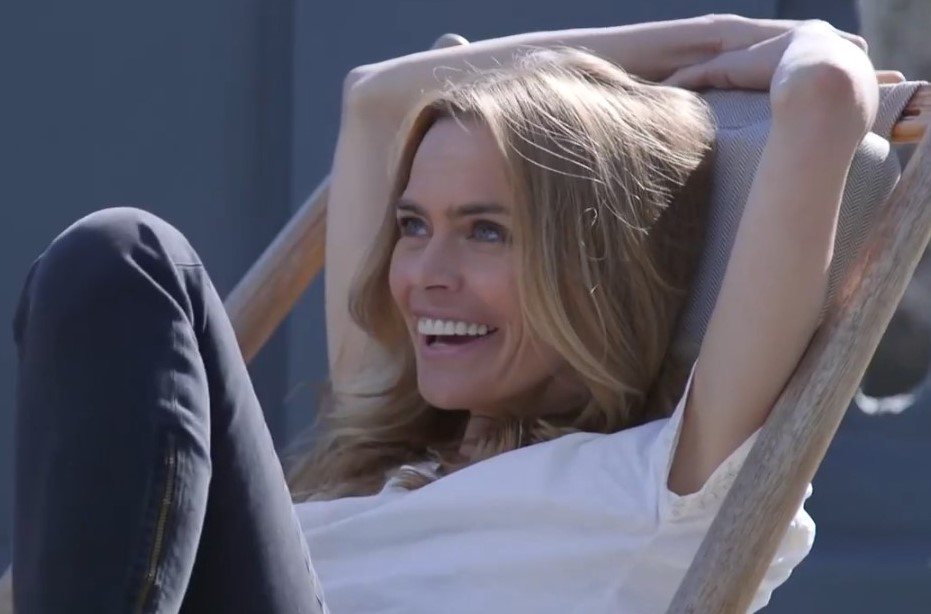
- Blume in 2021
- Born: 17 July 1977 (age 48); Germany

Verónica Blume (born 17 July 1977 in Germany) is a fashion model and actress based in Spain. She is best known to American audiences in the role of Veronica on the television sitcom Out of the Blue.
