= Don Rose =

American radio personality (1934–2005)

Donald Duane Rosenberg
- Born: July 5, 1934; North Platte, Nebraska
- Died: March 30, 2005 (age 70); Concord, California
- Other names: Dr. Don Rose
- Occupation: Disk jockey
- Known for: Morning disk jockey at radio station KFRC in San Francisco, California
- Children: Daniel; Kelly; John; James; Dave

Don Rose (born Donald Duane Rosenberg; July 5, 1934 – March 30, 2005), also known as "Dr. Donald D. Rose" or just "Dr. Don," was an American radio personality on KFRC AM 610 in San Francisco, California from October 1973 to 1986. Prior to joining KFRC, Rose had been a prominent broadcaster at WQXI (AM) in Atlanta, Georgia, and WFIL in Philadelphia, Pennsylvania. He was known for his one-liners, sound effects and philanthropy.

== Early years ==
Rose was born Donald Duane Rosenberg in North Platte, Nebraska, and got his first experience in broadcasting at age 15 while reporting on his trip to the 1950 Boy Scout National Jamboree in Valley Forge, Pennsylvania, for KODY in his hometown. He began his career in 1955 at KWBE in Beatrice, Nebraska, while majoring in accounting at the University of Nebraska. He moved to KLMS/Lincoln shortly thereafter, and then was hired by KOIL/Omaha, a job that appeared to be so promising that he dropped out of college in his senior year. However, he was fired by that station four weeks later.

His next job, at KTSA/San Antonio, also lasted only four weeks. Returning to Nebraska, he held an announcing position at KRNY/Kearney for about 15 months before being terminated again. His next employer, the Union Pacific Railroad, offered only manual labor — pounding spikes into the railbed — but he continued to pursue work in radio, and acquired a job at KTUL/Tulsa.

His next broadcasting position was in KWMT/Fort Dodge, Iowa, where he first complemented his jokes with cowbells and other barnyard sounds. His stay in Fort Dodge was fairly brief, but there he met his future wife, Kae, to whom he remained married for the next 45 years.

From Iowa he went on to WEBC/Duluth, Minnesota, followed by his first taste of big-market success, as morning host at WQXI/Atlanta ("Quixie In Dixie"), his fame made ever-lasting by his inclusion as the 1967 entry in the popular series of "Cruisin’" LP records. Originally hired for the nine-to-noon slot, he was shifted to morning drive shortly after his arrival, and soon became the number-one radio personality in town.

== Broadcasting career ==
With Rose as morning anchor, KFRC was voted "Station of the Year" four times by Billboard Magazine. He was considered by many to be the king of radio in the Bay Area during the final decade of AM's musical hegemony. He was named by Billboard Magazine as Disc Jockey of the Year on both the East Coast (while with WFIL Philadelphia) and on the West Coast (while with KFRC San Francisco). One of Rose's characteristic "sound bite" mannerisms when he was at KFRC was to state the words "that's right" in a continuous fashion that was intended to sound "crazy" or funny, which also served to represent the overall morning zoo radio format, style and "feel" of his show. Another sound bite that was used often was from a sexy female voice saying, "Oh, Dr. Don, you son of a BEEP."

"I'm married to radio," he told The Chronicle (San Francisco) in 1975, "and I'm thinking about suing it for nonsupport. I would describe my show as therapy, for myself."

During the 1980s, Jane Dornacker worked with him doing traffic. One of his running gags was feeding the dog Roscoe. This would involve Rose telling about what he and his wife Kae ate for dinner the night before, and then Roscoe would eat the "leftovers."

In addition to his radio broadcasting work, he hosted cartoon shows on Field Communications television stations in Chicago (WFLD 32), Detroit (WKBD 50), Philadelphia (WKBS 48) and San Francisco (KBHK 44) for over a decade. Dr. Don Rose raised a total of over $10 million by hosting March of Dimes Superwalks for 20 years. As well, he emceed many golf tourneys, including his own, with proceeds going toward Special Olympics and special education.

Despite his cheerful persona, Rose suffered over three decades of debilitating pain from assorted medical problems. In 1972, he underwent a botched heart surgery, which caused chronic knee infections that required 11 more operations and led to his losing his kneecap. He broadcast his daily radio show flat on his back from his home hospital bed for months. In 1984, after a fall made the knee problems worse, he had the damaged leg amputated.

Rose had to alter his on-air act in 1986 when KFRC changed its format to big band music and its imaging to Magic 61. He left KFRC permanently by the end of the year.

His departure from KFRC was followed by a short stint at KKIS/Concord-Walnut Creek beginning in 1987, where his son, Jay, was chief engineer. After a failed attempt at buying the station, Dr. Don moved to mornings at San Francisco's K101 (KIOI); four months later, he suffered a heart attack while on the air. He did not return to broadcasting on a full-time basis.

== Death and legacy ==
Rose died in his sleep on March 30, 2005, due to complications from pneumonia at the age of 70. He was married for 45 years to his wife Kae, with whom he had five children.

In 2006, Dr. Don Rose was elected to the Bay Area Radio Hall of Fame as a member of the first class to be inducted.

The Broadcast Pioneers of Philadelphia inducted Rose posthumously into their Hall of Fame in 2008.
