= Dick Clark's Rock, Roll & Remember =

American radio program

Dick Clark's Rock, Roll and Remember
- Genre: Rock 'n' roll radio/ Documentary program/ Oldies music
- Country of origin: USA
- Language: English
- Syndicates: United Stations Radio Networks
- Starring: Dick Clark
- Written by: Pam Miller
- Produced by: Frank Furino
- Original release: February 14, 1982 – 2004

Dick Clark's Rock, Roll and Remember (sometimes shortened to Rock, Roll and Remember) was a weekly American rock and roll radio documentary show hosted by Dick Clark featuring oldies music. It was broadcast on United Stations Radio Networks and its predecessors between 1982 and 2004, with reruns continuing until August 2020.

== History ==
It was first broadcast on February 14, 1982 and originally hosted by Gene Weed. The next year Clark and Mark Elliot became co-hosts. By 1985 Clark became the sole presenter. The show was written by Pam Miller and produced by Frank Furino. and named after the autobiography Clark co-wrote with Richard Robinson in 1976. In each episode Clark profiled a different rock 'n' roll artist from the 1950s and 1960s. He also counted down the top four songs that week from a certain year in the 1950s, 1960s or early 1970s. In 2004, when Clark suffered a stroke and was no longer able to speak clearly, production of the show ended. Beginning in 2009, Clark's profile segments for the show were integrated into another syndicated show, Rewind with Gary Bryan. (The current version of Rewind does not have any identifiable contributions from Clark.)

The show aired continuously in reruns from the time of Clark's stroke until 2020; these reruns have seen declining appearance since Clark's death in 2012, mainly since the "oldies" genre on most radio stations has since evolved into a 1970s/1980s-centered classic hits format that no longer features the 1950s and 1960s music that served as the show's core playlist. It still maintained a handful of affiliates, among them KZRO, WRHL, WGWE, and KWVF. (The latter two stations had yet to sign on at the time the show ended its first run.) On August 1, 2020, United Stations Radio Networks informed the show's remaining affiliates that it was withdrawing Rock, Roll & Remember reruns from syndication.

== Merchandising ==
Compilation records of the show have been released throughout the 1980s and 1990s.

The show was also adapted as a celebrity comic in 1995. Don Sherwood provided the drawings, while Fred Bronson wrote the scripts.
