= Eugenia Argiewicz =

Polish violinist (1887–1969)

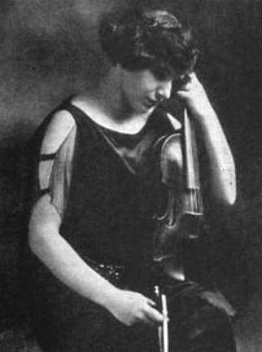
- Eugenia Argiewicz, from a 1921 advertisement
- Born: 16 June 1887; Warsaw
- Died: March 1969 (aged 81); San Francisco
- Other names: Eugenie Argiewicz, Eugenia Argiewicz Bem, Eugenia Bem, Genia Bem
- Occupation: Violinist

Eugenia Argiewicz (16 June 1887 – March 1969), later Eugenia Argiewicz Bem, was a Polish violinist based in San Francisco, California for much of her career.

== Early life ==
Eugenia Argiewicz was born in Warsaw. Her father sold military uniforms. She began studying music in childhood, and trained with violinist Eugène Ysaÿe in Brussels. Her brother Artur Argiewicz was also a noted violinist, and they sometimes performed together. Artur and their mother also moved to San Francisco. Another brother, Bernard, was a professional cellist based in Detroit and Philadelphia.

== Career ==
Argiewicz performed in major European cities in her youth. She moved to the United States in the 1910s. She was a soloist with the Seattle Symphony, In 1917 she accompanied British cellist May Mukle when she performed in Sacramento, and in the 1924–1925 season she played violin in the San Francisco Symphony. "Mme. Bem is intense and emotional," commented one Los Angeles reviewer in 1918, "but plays with a musicianly manner and her style is fresh and invigorating."

Argiewicz and her husband led the Stanislas Bem Little Orchestra, which performed at San Francisco's Whitcomb Hotel; they were among the first musicians to perform on KFRC radio when it began broadcasting in 1924, from the roof of the same hotel. They also played in a chamber trio with pianist Vladimir Shavitch, until she was replaced in 1918. She also played ragtime music.

== Personal life ==
Eugenia Argiewicz married cellist Stanisław Bem in 1915, in San Francisco. They had a daughter, Vanda (1920–2008), who became a concert pianist and music educator. Eugenia Argiewicz Bem was widowed in 1956, and died in 1969, in San Francisco, aged 82 years. Her granddaughter Gail Colman married San Francisco-based Spanish graphic artist Victor Moscoso. Eugenia Bem's great-grandson Justin "Justo" Moscoso ran for a seat in Congress in 2000, as the Green Party candidate.
