= WTHO-FM =

- Thomson, Georgia; United States
- Frequency: 101.7 MHz

Programming
- Format: Country
- Affiliations: Westwood One

Ownership
- Owner: Camellia City Communications, Inc.
- Sister stations: WTWA

History
- First air date: February 22, 1971

Technical information
- Licensing authority: FCC
- Facility ID: 8475
- Class: A
- ERP: 5,100 watts
- HAAT: 108 meters
- Transmitter coordinates: 33°28′20.00″N 82°31′2.00″W

Links
- Public license information: Public file; LMS
- Webcast: Listen Live
- Website: wtho.com

WTHO-FM (101.7 FM) is a radio station broadcasting a country music format. Licensed to Thomson, Georgia, United States. The station is currently owned by Camellia City Communications, Inc. and features programming from Westwood One.
