= Out of the Blue (1996 TV series) =

- Genre: Teen sitcom
- Created by: Sam Riddle; Matthew Hastings
- Starring: Paulo Benedeti; Veronica Blume; Carlos Conde; Jose Capote; Timothy Martinez
- Music by: The Grooveyard
- Country of origin: United States
- Original languages: Spanish; English
- No. of seasons: 1
- No. of episodes: 22

Production
- Executive producers: Michael Solomon; Sam Riddle; Al Burton; Miles Christensen
- Production location: Orlando, Florida
- Running time: 30 minutes
- Production companies: Sam Riddle Productions; Al Burton Productions; Christensen Entertainment; Solomon International Enterprises; Tribune Entertainment

Original release
- Network: Syndication
- Release: September 16, 1995 – February 11, 1996

Out of the Blue is an American teen sitcom that ran in syndication from September 16, 1995, to February 1996. The series was filmed on location at SeaWorld in Orlando, Florida, and distributed by Tribune Entertainment. It is notable in that each of its 22 episodes was filmed in both Spanish and English simultaneously and starred a predominantly Hispanic cast of several different nationalities.

The show was dubbed into German as Sommer Sonne Florida, and into Italian as Un salto nel blu, but was poorly distributed and largely unknown in Germany, Italy, the United States, or Latin America.

Among the show's young cast was Spanish fashion model Veronica Blume, whose budding real-life modeling career was occasionally incorporated into the show's storyline, and Paulo Benedeti, who would later play recurring roles on American soap operas.

== Cast ==
- Veronica Blume (Spanish) as Veronica
- Paulo Benedeti (Colombian) as Max
- Brooke Burns (American; the show's only non-Hispanic) as Peg
- Timothy Martinez (American) as Timmy
- Carlos Conde as Charlie
- Jose Capote as Jose
- Maite Arnedo as Maria

== Episodes ==
| No. | Title | Directed by | Written by | Original release date |
|---|---|---|---|---|
| 1 | "Pilot" | Peter Baldwin | Michael Rowe | September 16, 1995 |
A marine amusement park in sunny Florida is the setting for this turbulent series. The focus: six lively teens who work in the park. There's whale trainer Charlie, dancer Veronica, tour guide José, water ski star Max, dolphin trainer Maria and waiter Timmy. Music Video: Del Azul (Out of the Blue theme song) performed by the cast
| 2 | "Fit to a Tee" | TBD | TBD | 1995 |
José comes up with the idea of printing t-shirts with the image of Shamu the whale and selling them to tourists. By mistake, the shirts are printed with a snapshot of José. Now the friends have to come up with some ideas to sell things. Music: Dive
| 3 | "Big Break Blues" | TBD | TBD | 1995 |
Maria is currently working on a new dolphin show. Then she learns that her assistant coach Arthur has been ill for a long time. Max spontaneously offers to stand in for Arthur. Just now, Charlie comes up with the idea of making Max a singing star. Music: Money
| 4 | "Max Factor" | Luis Gustavo | David M. Israel & Jim O'Doherty | October 21, 1995 |
During his water ski show, Max discovers a pretty girl in the audience. In fact, he manages to make her acquaintance. When his beloved opens her mouth for the first time, Max experiences a nasty surprise: Eleanore has an unbearable voice. Music Video:
| 5 | "Loch Ness Mess" | Jay Bakerink | Story by : Mike Langworthy; Teleplay by : Fritz Coleman & Roger Rietzel | 1995 |
Maria, Charlie and Max take a trip to Lake Nell. A sea monster is said to be up there. Charlie thinks he spotted the monster. He wants to get to the bottom of the matter. When Max and Maria are back home, an eerie creature emerges from the lake. Music: Fiesta (Instrumental)
| 6 | "Congratulations, You Have a 350 lb. Baby Girl" | Luis Gustavo | Mark Miller | September 23, 1995 |
The whale Shamu is expecting his baby any moment. So Charlie decides to stay with him. Actually, he had planned to drive a car race. Now José is supposed to represent him in the race. But he doesn't even have a driver's license. Music: Now Forever and Always
| 7 | "Mixed Doubles" | Robert Kubilos | Moses Port & David Guarascio | September 30, 1995 |
Max had an argument with his girlfriend April. She then disappears without a trace. A few days later, Max has to appear at a reception. In desperation, he asks José to dress up as a woman and pretend to be April. Music Video: We Can Be More Than Friends
| 8 | "Future Shock" | Luis Gustavo | Melanie O'Connell & Helie Lee | October 14, 1995 |
José and Maria have their future predicted. They eagerly await whether the prophecies will come true. Meanwhile, Charlie faces off against a former classmate in a competition. He used to be superior to him in all sports. Music Video:
| 9 | "Marco Polo" | Robert Kubilos | Moses Port & David Guarascio | October 7, 1995 |
Timmy gets his hands on a perfume that makes him a crush on every woman. Veronica is also extremely popular. The fashion photographer Marco is so enthusiastic about her that he wants to take her to Europe. There he wants to develop her into a supermodel. Note: This is Maite Arnedo's (Maria) last episode. Music Video:
| 10 | "Timmy-tism" | Christopher Casler | Moses Port & David Guarascio | October 28, 1995 |
Timmy reads a book about hypnosis. Now he wants to prove to his friends that he can manipulate them effortlessly. Max wants to use this for himself right away: he wants to use hypnosis to win the favor of pretty Lisa. Unfortunately, something goes wrong: Instead of Lisa, Veronica has a crush on him. Note: Maite Arnedo (Maria) does not appear in this episode and her final appearance to appear in the opening credits. Music: Is It Me?
| 11 | "Shock Jock Jr." | Michael Barry | John Vorhaus | November 4, 1995 |
Famed radio host Jerry Klein hosts a live show from the amusement park. Max is allowed to do an interview with Veronica on the show. Jerry recommends that he clamp down on his guest. So Max makes tacky jokes about poor Veronica. Music: Drive Us To Heaven
| 12 | "One for a Million" | Christopher Casler | Brian Kahan | November 18, 1995 |
Dolphin trainer Karen gets a chance to win $1 million. To do this, she has to throw the ball into the basket from the center line of a basketball field. Unfortunately, Karen still had a nice basketball in her hand. Now her colleagues from the park are tutoring her. Note: Veronica Blume does not appear in this episode. Music Video: Don't Stop the Funk
| 13 | "The Zimmies (aka Charles Perez: Trophy Dating)" | Troy Cornelius | Story by : Al Burton & Donnie Brainard; Teleplay by : John Vorhaus | November 11, 1995 |
Talk show host Charles Perez overhears Max uttering some exquisite macho sayings. He decides to put a real damper on him and his friends. Guest Appearance: Charles Perez Note: Veronica Blume does not appear in this episode.
| 14 | "Julio Iglesias, Jr." | Troy Cornelius | Moses Port & David Guarascio | November 25, 1995 |
Veronica meets Julio Iglesias Jr., the son of the famous pop singer. She immediately falls in love with the handsome and charming young man. Max is less enthusiastic about his appearance: the women only have eyes for Julio now. Note: Carlos Conde (Charlie) does not appear in this episode. Music: You Could Be My Girl
| 15 | "Madrid" | Tony Markes | John Vorhaus | December 2, 1995 |
Veronica flies to Madrid. There she takes part in a fashion show with great success. She also meets the bullfighter Diego and falls in love with him. The question now is whether to stay in Europe or return to Florida. Music Video: And I Work
| 16 | "Smilin' Jack" | Unknown | Unknown | February 17, 1996 |
Veronica is sitting in the Java Lounge. Suddenly a horde of young people rushes in and causes huge chaos. Crank, the leader of the group, explains to her that his people defused a bomb at the last second. Note: José Capote, Carlos Conde (Charlie), Paulo Benedeti (Max) and Timothy Martinez do not appear in this episode. Veronica Blume is the only main cast member to appear in this episode. Brooke Burns plays Meg in this episode.
| 17 | "My Fair José" | Tony Markes | Story by : Moses Port & David Gurascio; Teleplay by : Judith Lutz | February 24, 1996 |
José meets Princess Glicia of Baronia. He befriends her and learns how boring she finds her life. He then advises her to think more about herself. The princess takes this advice to heart - and disappears without a trace. Note: Timothy Martinez does not appear in this episode. Music: I'm Here For You
| 18 | "Fanatee" | Rick Moncada | Cort Casady | 1996 |
Timmy falls in love with a girl at the Java lounge. He thinks she is reciprocating his feelings; however, she only wants to use it to steal a valuable manatee from the park. Timmy's friends become suspicious and investigate the matter. Note: Paulo Benedeti (Max) does not appear in this episode. Music Video: You'll Never Miss
| 19 | "Jumping for Joy" | Unknown | Unknown | February 10, 1996 |
The new dolphin trainer Peggy is a passionate skydiver. When Veronica finds out, she immediately wants to do a test jump. Peggy also offers Max, Charlie and José a crash course. But the boys are scared. Note: Brooke Burns plays Peg in this episode until the remainder of the series. Music: Jumping' for Joy
| 20 | "Peg's Choice" | Troy Cornelius | Mark Miller | 1996 |
A cooking competition for the best chilli is held in the park. Timmy got extra hot peppers for this purpose. Unfortunately, José eats up the peppers. Days later he suffers from the consequences. Music Video: Walking on Air
| 21 | "Enter the Dragonfly" | TBD | TBD | 1996 |
Tammy's ex-boyfriend Klaus doesn't want to accept that Timmy is now her number one. He challenges him to a duel. Timmy is physically clearly inferior to the muscle man. But he is determined to fight for his love. Music Video:
| 22 | "Hurricane" | Rick Moncada | Mary Schwartz & Robert Briscoe Evans | 1996 |
A hurricane is heading towards the amusement park. He wreaks great havoc. The friends take refuge in the Java Lounge. Only José is out there and in great danger. Note: Series Finale Music Video Clips playing in the end credits: You Could Be My Girl, Jumping' for Joy, Drive Us To Heaven, Don't Stop the Funk & You'll Never Miss

== Stations ==
| City | Station |
|---|---|
| Baxley | WUBI 34 |
| Boston | WLVI 56 |
| Chicago | WGN 9 |
| El Paso | KFOX 14 |
| Fairbanks | KFYF 7 |
| Hartford | WFSB 3 |
| Louisville | WBNA 21 |
| Oklahoma City | KOKH 25 |
| Providence | WNAC 64 |
| Seattle | KTZZ 22 |
| Tampa | WTVT 13 |
| Valdosta | WSWG 44 |
| York | WPMT 43 |
