= Boss Radio =

Radio programming formats in US and UK

Boss Radio was the name of two radio programming formats, both launched in the early 1960s: One in the United States, and one in the United Kingdom. Although the names were the same, the formats were quite different.

The word "boss" was early 1960s American slang for something fashionably attractive or impressive.

== Boss Radio in the United States ==
Although developed earlier at other stations, the U.S. "Boss Radio" format is most closely associated with KHJ in Los Angeles, at 930 kHz AM.

KHJ, one of the first radio stations in Los Angeles, had gone on the air in 1922 and in later years was owned by RKO, a major U.S. corporation which produced movies, television and radio programming over its own stations. In the 1940s and 1950s, KHJ broadcast a mix of drama, mystery, soap operas, news, and music, both live and recorded. In the early 1960s the format was adult contemporary music. The audience ratings were dominated by KFWB, KRLA, KABC and KMPC, and KHJ lagged far behind the other stations.

Block programming gave way to Top 40 radio during the 1950s. Stations played from 40 to 75 current records each week. Disc jockeys were talkative and the jingles were often a full minute in length. Two California radio programming pioneers, Bill Drake and Gene Chenault, modified the Top 40 formula to include a smaller number of records, heavier rotation of the biggest hits, very short jingles and less talk. The new sound would come to be known as "Boss Radio". KHJ General Manager Ken DeVaney originated the phrase. The word "boss" had come to mean something hip, new, exciting and the top of its class. Drake had tested some of the format elements in 1961 and 1962 while he served as program director and morning man at San Francisco's KYA, a station that promoted itself at the time as "The Boss of the Bay". At about the same time, competitor station KEWB promoted itself via its station ID jingles as "Boss Radio".

Drake and Chenault introduced and further developed this format at KYNO in Fresno, KSTN in Stockton, and KGB AM in San Diego. In April 1965 they brought it to KHJ.

Within a few months the "Boss Radio" format had brought KHJ to the top of the ratings in the Los Angeles market. It also firmly established the careers of several "boss jocks" such as The Real Don Steele and Robert W. Morgan who helped to put "Boss Radio" on the air in Los Angeles, under the guidance of program director Ron Jacobs. (The other original Boss Jocks in the spring of 1965 included Roger Christian, Gary Mack, Dave Diamond, Sam Riddle, and Johnny Williams.)

As a result of the station's success, several other stations adopted the format, notably KFRC in San Francisco, WFIL in Philadelphia, WRKO in Boston, and eventually reaching as far north as Canadian border blaster CKLW in Windsor, Ontario (targeting metro Detroit area). As a result of its powerful 50,000-watt signal and overnight signal propagation, CKLW was able to garner an international audience—even as far as Soviet Russia, making it almost certainly (though unprovably) the biggest of the "Boss Radios".

== Swinging Radio England ==
Swinging Radio England or "SRE" was the "home of the boss jocks and much more music". The radio station began life in the spring of 1966 on board the former US Army/Navy Vessel USS Deal (FS-263, AKL-2, AG-131) MV Olga Patricia, renamed the Laissez Faire. The ship was anchored three and a half miles off the Frinton-on-Sea, Essex coast of Britain in international waters.

SRE's format was not so much a format as a hybrid of formats. The station was totally unlike any other radio station that had previously been heard in Europe or probably anywhere else in the world at that time. While the PAMS jingles were a resung version of those heard on WABC in New York City and many other stations throughout the States, SRE had a custom melody line unused anywhere else in the world, the high-power "bannerline" news presentation had been lifted from WFUN in Miami, Florida and the DJs were using the heavy echo and the forced approach of stations such as KBOX in Dallas, Texas.

The U.S. "boss jocks" who came over with the ship trained the few English air personnel how to develop this same style of presentation. Everything was "over the top" when it came to the 50 kilowatt transmissions of SRE. While some listeners loved it, most remained tuned to the more relaxed top 40 formats of its competitors such as Wonderful Radio London and Radio Caroline South.

Swinging Radio England shared the ship from which it broadcast with another 50 kW station named Britain Radio, a beautiful music format station which called itself the "Hallmark of Quality". These two 50 kW stations attempted to broadcast at full power by using caged antennas slung from a central broadcasting mast, which caused constant headaches for the radio engineers. Because of the difficulty in getting the two stations to stay on the air, much early investment money was squandered. Other problems also arose when the British government announced that it would introduce legislation to close all of the offshore stations.

Because of the technical difficulties and the slow start, compounded by a lack of advertising, SRE was forced to sign off the air during November 1966 in a cloud of adverse publicity surrounding its London based advertising sales arm which went out of business in a hailstorm of debt.

== Popular culture ==
- Comedian George Carlin once joked about "Boss Radio" in his "Son of WINO" skit on his album FM & AM; "Hi gang. Scott Lame here. The Boss jock with the Boss sound from the Boss list of the Boss 30 that my Boss told me to play."
- Singer/songwriter/radio DJ Barry Smolin released a 2009 music album, "Bring Back the Real Don Steele", which opens with a track called "Boss Radio".

== Bibliography ==
- Mass Media Moments in the United Kingdom, the USSR and the US, by Gilder, Eric. - "Lucian Blaga" University of Sibiu Press, Romania. 2003 ISBN 973-651-596-6
- The Beat Fleet: The story behind the 60s 'pirate' radio stations - Leonard, Mike - Forest Press (Heswall), UK. 2004 ISBN 0-9527684-1-0
- Radio Revolution: The rise and fall of The Big 8. TV Documentary by Eric McNamara (Winner - 2004 Gemini Award Best History Documentary), & DVD - Markham St. Films 2005
