= KRTH =

- Los Angeles, California; United States
- Broadcast area: Greater Los Angeles
- Frequency: 101.1 MHz (HD Radio)
- Branding: K-Earth 101

Programming
- Language: English
- Format: Classic hits
- Subchannels: HD2: Channel Q
- Affiliations: United Stations Radio Networks

Ownership
- Owner: Audacy, Inc.; (Audacy License, LLC)
- Sister stations: KCBS-FM; KFRG; KNX; KNX-FM; KROQ-FM; KTWV; KXFG

History
- First air date: August 11, 1941
- Former call signs: K45LA (1941–1943); KHJ-FM (1943–1972); KRTH-FM (1986–1990)
- Former frequencies: 44.5 MHz (1941–1946); 99.7 MHz (1946–1947)
- Call sign meaning: Named after Earth Day

Technical information
- Licensing authority: FCC
- Facility ID: 28631
- Class: B
- ERP: 51,000 watts
- HAAT: 955 meters (3,133 ft)
- Transmitter coordinates: 34°13′38″N 118°4′3.2″W

Links
- Public license information: Public file; LMS
- Webcast: Listen live (via Audacy)
- Website: audacy.com/kearth101

KRTH (101.1 FM, "K-Earth 101") is a commercial radio station licensed to Los Angeles, California, United States, and serves the Greater Los Angeles area. The station is owned by Audacy, Inc. and broadcasts a classic hits format. KRTH's studios are located on Wilshire Boulevard in the Miracle Mile district of Los Angeles. The station's signal covers an extremely large area of Southern California due in part to its antenna location on Mt. Wilson. It can be heard as far south as San Diego, as far east as Palm Springs, as far west as Santa Barbara, and as far north as Barstow. KRTH is the flagship station for the nationally syndicated program Rewind with Gary Bryan.

KRTH broadcasts in the HD Radio (hybrid) format.

== History ==
=== Early years ===
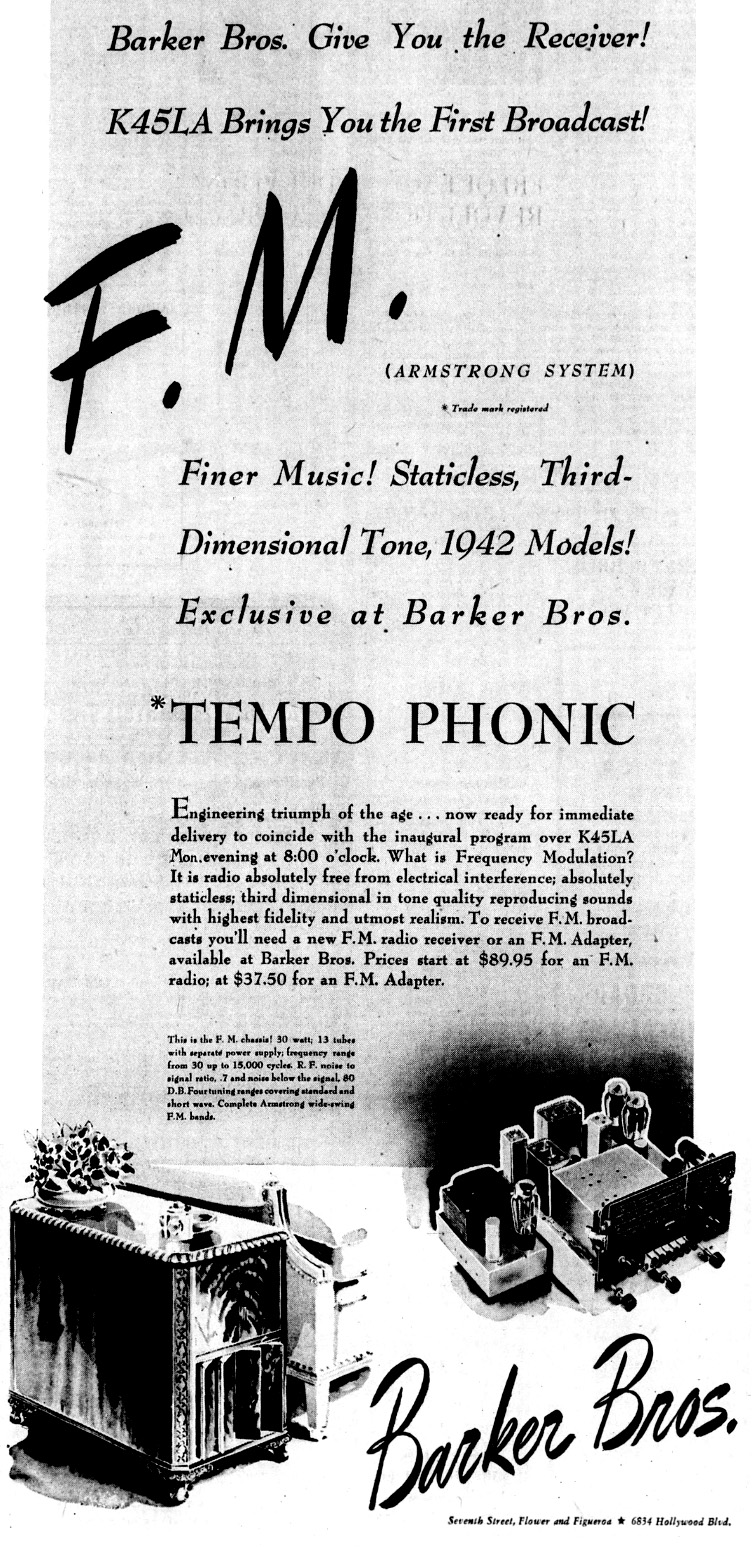
K45LA made its debut broadcast on August 11, 1941.

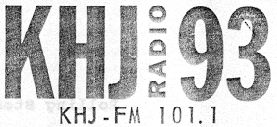
Logo when simulcasting KHJ, used from 1963 to 1965

In May 1940, the Federal Communications Commission (FCC) authorized an FM band effective January 1, 1941, operating on 40 channels spanning 42–50 MHz. (This was later changed to 88–106 MHz, and still later to 88–108 MHz, which increased the number of channels to 100.) On October 31, 1940, the first fifteen construction permits for commercial FM stations were issued, including one to Don Lee Broadcasting System for a station in Los Angeles at 44.5 MHz, which was issued the call sign K45LA. K45LA signed on August 11, 1941, as the first FM station in Los Angeles, broadcasting from a tower atop Mount Lee; it is the oldest continuously operating FM station in California. Effective November 1, 1943, the FCC modified its policy for commercial FM station call letters, and the call sign was changed to KHJ-FM, after its sister AM station KHJ. In 1946, as part of a transfer of stations to the new FM band, KHJ-FM was assigned to 99.7 MHz. In 1947, KHJ-FM was reassigned to its current broadcast frequency of 101.1 FM, eventually relocating its transmitter to Mount Wilson.

In 1965, when KHJ adopted its "Boss Radio" top-40 format, that station was simulcast on KHJ-FM. From 1968 to 1970, KHJ-FM aired Drake-Chenault's "Hit Parade" format, an automated mix of older songs and current hits. In 1971, the station carried another Drake-Chenault top 40 format, "Solid Gold Rock And Roll".

=== K-Earth 101 ===
==== Oldies ====
On October 16, 1972, KHJ-FM switched to what was then called a "gold" format, featuring older hit songs from the past. At the time, this "oldies" format featuring songs from 1953 to 1963 was a novel idea since most stations played current music with only a few older songs mixed in. The only local competition in this format was KWOW (1600 AM), a mostly automated station in nearby Pomona. With the switch in format came a new moniker: "K-Earth", named after Earth Day which had debuted to much fanfare two years before. New matching call letters KRTH accompanied the change. The "K-Earth 101" jingle was also introduced at this time; it directly echoed the sound and notes of the jingle from KHJ, the station where many of these "gold" songs had originally been played. (KHJ was still on the air at this point, but was playing current top 40 songs.)

In the late 1970s, under program director Bob Hamilton, KRTH added current hits to its oldies playlist—essentially an adult contemporary format. Though current music was played to varying degrees through the early 1980s, K-Earth's format remained focused on the past.

In 1985, KRTH solidified its oldies format, adopting the motto "Classic Rock and Roll". K-Earth began promoting its "Good Time Oldies" image with frequent TV ads featuring Beach Boys music, classic cars, palm trees, and the ever-present K-Earth jingle. The songs featured were from 1955 to 1978, with the focus largely on the 1960s. Doo-wop, early rock, Motown, girl groups, Elvis Presley, and the Beatles were the mainstays of the station's music mix. Throughout the 1980s, K-Earth would feature huge weekend specialties, including #1 music over the Labor Day weekend. Every L.A. #1 song would be played in chronological order (utilizing the older KHJ Boss 30, KFWB Fab Forty, and other local charts) from 1955 through 1985. The weekend before would feature the "Runners Up of Classic Rock and Roll Weekend", consisting of #2 songs. The "Firecracker 300" was played over the Fourth of July weekend. Other specials included a Memorial Day weekend "A to Z", the "Super Sixties Weekend", and the "Souvenirs of the Seventies Weekend". In February 1986, KHJ adopted the KRTH call letters; this necessitated the FM station adjusting its call sign to KRTH-FM. In 1988, RKO General sold KRTH-AM-FM to Beasley Broadcasting due to the scandals involving KHJ-TV which forced the former company out of broadcasting.

Oldies were a ratings success for KRTH-FM and similar stations across the United States and Canada. In March 1989, another Los Angeles FM oldies station emerged at 93.1 FM under the call sign KODJ, later KCBS-FM, as a direct competitor to KRTH-FM. KODJ/KCBS-FM played oldies from 1955 to 1972 with a heavy focus on pre-1964 oldies. KRTH-FM, which reverted to the KRTH call sign in May 1990, continued acknowledging the mid- and late 1970s and continued playing moderate amounts of pre-1964 material until 1991, when management eliminated the 1980s music and most post-1972 songs. The two stations went head-to-head for a few years, with K-Earth consistently getting higher ratings and emerging as the winner. In an attempt to distinguish itself from K-Earth and regain the oldies audience, KODJ changed its call letters to KCBS-FM and, in early 1993, began playing mostly pre-1965 oldies. KCBS-FM successfully switched to a classic rock format in late 1993 called "Arrow 93", but later flipped to adult hits as "Jack FM". KRTH, by then, focused on the 1964–1969 period with moderate amounts of pre-1964 and 1970s songs each hour. The station remained a competitor with Pasadena's AM oldies station KRLA until 1998, when that station switched formats. KRTH was sold to Infinity Radio in 1994.

From 1992 to 1997, K-Earth was the home of The Real Don Steele and Robert W. Morgan, who were co-workers at KHJ during the 1960s Boss Radio era. In April 1997, Steele announced in a very emotional on-air statement that he had lung cancer, which subsequently led to both his retirement as well as his death by the summer of 1997. Six weeks later, in May 1997, Morgan would grip audiences with his own heartfelt announcement that he had the same disease. His death several months later severed KRTH's last link to Boss Radio. "Shotgun" Tom Kelly succeeded Don Steele in afternoon drive that September.

KRTH changed hands in 1996 when Infinity was purchased by Westinghouse Broadcasting, which at the time owned CBS, making KRTH and KCBS-FM sister stations. K-Earth continued with its oldies format, adjusting it toward the end of the decade. Older songs from before the British Invasion of 1964 were increasingly dropped from the playlist, and the station began to emphasize music of the late 1960s, especially that of Motown. The playlist itself began to shrink, with only the biggest, most-requested hits from this period played in heavy repetition. In 2002, the station would be reunited under common ownership with the former KHJ-TV when CBS bought KCAL-TV; KRTH wound up moving into KCAL's old facility at 5515 Melrose Avenue in Hollywood (on the Paramount Pictures studio lot) as a result of KCAL's operations being merged into KCBS-TV's Columbia Square facility, which KRTH had been operating out of. (They would again be split after the sale of the radio stations to Entercom in 2017.)

==== Evolution to classic hits ====
With its target demographics aging and ratings sagging, KRTH, along with most oldies outlets across the country, began adding 1970s songs to the playlist in the early 2000s, particularly disco. Artists such as Stevie Wonder, Elton John, ABBA, the Bee Gees, Earth, Wind & Fire, and Peter Frampton were combined with 1960s artists such as The Supremes and the Beatles. Though still repetitive, the playlist was also rotated more frequently, with a few rediscovered oldies brought "out of the vault" on occasion, while other songs were "rested" from the rotation. This process was taken a step further in 2007 with a few early 1980s songs added to the mix by artists such as Hall & Oates, Phil Collins, and Michael Jackson. By the end of 2007, K-Earth had improved its ratings substantially and was once again ranked among the top 10 stations in the Los Angeles market. More importantly from an advertising standpoint, the station was attracting a younger demographic. In November 2009, KRTH reached its first milestone by reaching their first #1 overall in the Arbitron 12+ Ratings; the station had never reached a #1 overall in its 37 years broadcasting as K-Earth. In 2010, K-Earth began adding songs from the mid- to late 1980s into its mix from artists such as Janet Jackson, The Bangles, Deniece Williams, and The Police. KRTH still played an occasional pre-1964 song such as "Shout", "Jailhouse Rock", or "Tequila" (about one every other hour).

Another change that was made in the 2000s was the addition of adult contemporary Christmas music during the holiday season from performers such as Mannheim Steamroller, Air Supply, and Barry Manilow. Airing three times an hour, this holiday fare was designed to entice listeners away from AC competitor KOST, which annually shoots to #1 in the ratings with its all-Christmas format. (In years past, K-Earth played a similar amount of Christmas music, but only from oldies artists such as the Beach Boys or Alvin and the Chipmunks.) For several years, KRTH switched to all-Christmas music from 12:00 p.m. on Christmas Eve to 12:00 p.m. on Christmas Day.

First logo for KRTH as a classic hits station, used until 2019.

Following the departure of program director Jhani Kaye in 2013, a series of changes at KRTH accelerated the station's transition from oldies to a classic hits format. After Labor Day 2013, under new PD Rick Thomas, the station began to remove a portion of 1960s music, as it had appealed to a much older audience than was measurable by the ratings system. In addition, most early 1970s hits, as well as soul hits from the late 1960s through the mid-1970s, were eliminated; the playlist now focused on music from 1973 to 1989 (with only a few pre-1973 songs per day). With these changes, ratings rose substantially. In June 2014, CBS transferred Thomas to New York, with Chris Ebbott replacing him as program director. Ebbott was previously PD at CKFM-FM in Toronto. Also in 2014, Johnny Mann, whose singers have been responsible for KRTH's jingles over the years, died. Additionally, Charlie Van Dyke, who was KRTH's voiceover artist in recent years but more recently has also been the imaging voice of KABC-TV, was replaced as station voiceover with Joe Cipriano, the longtime voice of the Fox Television Network. In August 2015, "Shotgun" Tom Kelly left his afternoon drive position but remained with KRTH in an "ambassador" role, making public appearances and otherwise representing the station off-air. By early 2016, KRTH began adding songs from the 1990s into its playlist.

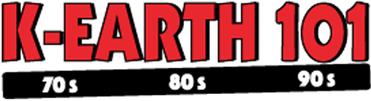
Final logo style before mid-September 2023.

On February 2, 2017, CBS Radio announced it would merge with Entercom. The merger was approved on November 9, 2017, and was consummated on November 17. As of 2018, KRTH no longer plays music from the 1960s, with its playlist shifting towards hits from the late 1970s through the early 2000s, with a heavy focus on the 1980s. However, the station's playlist is limited to avoid excessive overlap with sister station KCBS-FM, which airs an adult hits format.

In addition to Rewind with Gary Bryan, KRTH also broadcasts America's Greatest Hits, hosted by Scott Shannon, and the 1980s and 1990s editions of Backtrax USA with Kid Kelly on the weekends. Bryan, Kelly, and Shannon are all former disc jockeys at WHTZ (Z100) in New York City. Around the 2020s, KRTH started playing more songs from the 1990s. In addition, 2000s and 2010s have been added to the playlist.

== HD Radio ==
KRTH broadcasts in HD Radio with two subchannels:

- KRTH-HD1 is a digital simulcast of the analog signal; it was launched in 2007.
- KRTH-HD2 airs an LGBTQ-oriented talk/EDM format as Channel Q.

KRTH-HD2 began broadcasting in 2010, originally featuring oldies from the 1955–1970 period, with an emphasis on the late 1960s and Motown which had been removed from the main channel's playlist. The HD2 station was originally branded "K-Earth Classics" and also streamed online. KRTH-HD2 was reported by social media sites and the TuneIn platform to be the highest listener rated station of CBS Radio's owned-and-operated oldies stations. On May 11, 2016, the channel began carrying Radio Disney under a brokered arrangement between The Walt Disney Company and CBS Radio. This arrangement ended in June 2018, when the HD2 subchannel became a simulcast of all-news KNX (1070 AM); this would last until late 2021 after sister station KNOU (97.1 FM) was flipped to a simulcast of KNX. As of November 2022, KRTH-HD2 airs an LGBTQ-oriented talk/EDM format, known as Channel Q, which also continued airing on KNX-FM's HD2 subchannel until May 2026 when the KNX simulcast was moved there following 97.1's flip to sports talk.

== Awards and nominations ==
Since 2011, KRTH has earned five Marconi Radio Award nominations, winning three awards.

Year	Awards	Category	Recipient	Result	Source
2011	NAB Marconi Radio Awards	Oldies Station of the Year		Nominated	
2016	NAB Marconi Radio Awards	Classic Hits Station of the Year		Won	
2017	NAB Marconi Radio Awards	Major Market Station of the Year		Nominated	
2018	NAB Marconi Radio Awards	Classic Hits Station of the Year		Won	
2019	NAB Marconi Radio Awards	Legendary Station of the Year		Won	

== Notable personalities ==
- Brian Beirne, "Mr. Rock 'N Roll"
- Gary Bryan
- Roger Christian
- Rich Fields, former announcer on The Price is Right
- Sean "Hollywood" Hamilton
- Dave Hull, "The Hullabalooer"
- Dan Ingram (June 1998; one week only)
- "Shotgun" Tom Kelly (1997–2015)
- Robert W. Morgan
- Bob Shannon
- The Real Don Steele
- Charlie Tuna
- Charlie Van Dyke
- Wolfman Jack
