= Sam Riddle =

American television producer and disc jockey (1937–2021)

Sam Riddle (December 12, 1937 – September 27, 2021) was an American television host, producer, and disc jockey. He gained fame as one of the original "Boss Radio" DJs on KHJ in Los Angeles. Riddle hosted the popular teen music programs 9th Street West and Hollywood a Go Go in the 1960s. He went on to produce various television shows, including the talent competition series Star Search.

== Life and career ==
Samuel Earl Riddle was born in Fort Worth, Texas on December 12, 1937. He served in the Air Force Reserves during the Vietnam War.

Riddle began his radio career at KCLE in Cleburne, Texas. While he was a student at Texas Technological College, he had a television show on KDUB in Lubbock, Texas. Riddle later worked as a disc jockey in Arizona, and KDEO in San Diego before he joined the staff at KRLA in Los Angeles in 1960. He eventually moved to KFWB and became one of the popular Boss Jocks on the influential "Boss Radio" on KHJ.

In 1964, Riddle began hosting the local program 9th Street West on KHJ-TV (Channel 9). He became popular in the teen market, resulting in a spinoff show called 9th Street a Go Go. That show was syndicated in early 1965 and renamed Hollywood a Go Go. Riddle simultaneously hosted Channel 9's daily 9th Street West program and the station's Hollywood a Go Go, which aired on Saturday nights.

Riddle formed his own company, Sam Riddle Organization (SRO), to produce commercials and musical shows for the teen demographic. In 1965, he hosted the TV specials Cheerio a Go Go, an hour musical filmed in London, and Aloha a Go Go, an hour special filmed in Hawaii.

In 1967, Riddle hosted the Miss Teen USA pageant at the Hollywood Palladium. He hosted the game show The Groovy Game, which was reformatted to the dance program The Groovy Show in 1968. In 1970, Riddle and Cass Elliot co-hosted the music program Get It Together.

Riddle continued to work on radio for stations KDAY and KROQ-FM before returning to KHJ in 1974. In the mid-1970s, Riddle left radio to produce TV programs.

In the 1970s, Riddle was a television producer for the British series Almost Anything Goes and the American series Hollywood Teen. He also worked as an announcer for The Wizard of Odds. From 1983 to 1994, Riddle produced and narrated the talent competition show Star Search, which was hosted by Ed McMahon. In the 1990s, Riddle served as a producer for series such as Triple Threat, Out of the Blue, House of Pop, and Destination Stardom. In the 2000s, Riddle produced the Ultimate Poker Challenge, Poker Boss and other card tournament shows. He also oversaw the production of various Spanish series and specials for Telemundo and Univision, and he managed acts for record labels such as Sony BMG and EMI Latin.

As an actor, Riddle played an announcer in the sitcom Green Acres, the film Clambake (1967), and later in the series Burke’s Law. He also had a role in the comedy film Tunnel Vision (1976).

Riddle died at the age of 83 in Palm Desert, California, after a battle with Lewy body dementia.
