= Hollywood a Go Go =

US television program

- Directed by: Joe Agnello
- Presented by: Sam Riddle
- Country of origin: United States
- No. of seasons: 1
- No. of episodes: 52

Production
- Executive producer: Al Burton
- Camera setup: Eigel Pedersen; Marsh Theemling; Fred Anzalone; Bill Buck; Doug Schneider
- Running time: 60 mins.
- Production company: Four Star Television

Original release
- Network: Syndication
- Release: 1965 – 1966

Hollywood a Go Go is a Los Angeles–based music variety show that ran in syndication from 1965 to 1966. The show was hosted by Sam Riddle, with music by The Sinners and dancing by The Gazzarri Dancers. It was filmed at the KHJ-TV studios in Los Angeles. Rights to surviving footage of the show (preserved on kinescope film) are now represented by Retro Video, Inc.

== History ==
The program originated as a spinoff of the daily program 9th Street West called 9th Street a Go Go, which aired on Saturdays on KHJ-TV (Channel 9). The show proved to be such a success that it transformed into the nationally syndicated Hollywood a Go Go. The first episode of Hollywood a Go Go aired in February 1965. Its original syndicator was Four Star Television. The show ceased production in 1966, with some television stations airing the show as late as the summer of 1966. In its brief run (52 episodes), the show featured various well-known acts. The Sinners were the house band featuring Eddie Kaplan on lead guitar.

After viewing the debut episode in 1965, a Billboard reviewer wrote:

One gets the feeling of being amidst a Zulu uprising or witnessing a contemporary interpretation of Dante's Inferno. Host Sam Riddle...introduces his guests shouting at the top of his voice to the accompaniment of jungle drums (there must be a message in there somewhere). The set is reminiscent of a speakeasy or a prison yard with its stone wall backdrop...During the lip-synched performances of the guest artists, members of the Gazzari [sic] dancers swing, sway, weave and gyrate with flailing arms from a postage stamp sized stage, step ladders and other lofty perches...The tempo is mostly upbeat with the emphasis on the driving, breast-beating sounds. With more than half of this nation's population seen to be under 25 years of age, there is much practical economics in this programming.

== List of performers ==
- Ike & Tina Turner
- The Rolling Stones
- The Everly Brothers
- Frankie Lymon
- Marvin Gaye
- Edwin Starr
- The Ronettes
- Del Shannon
- Bobby Vee
- Peter and Gordon
- Donovan
- The Challengers
- Smokey Robinson & the Miracles
- The Impressions
- James Brown
- Jackie Wilson
- Rick Nelson
- Lesley Gore
- Fontella Bass
- Wilson Pickett
- James Darren
- Tommy Roe
- Booker T. & the M.G.'s
- Bo Diddley
- Freddy Cannon
- Sonny & Cher
- Jackie DeShannon
- Sam the Sham
- The Byrds
- The Turtles
- The Toys
- The Yardbirds
- The Beau Brummels
- Bobby Fuller Four
- The Knickerbockers
- The Fugitives
- Donnie Brooks
- Lou Christie
- Bob Lind
- Don Julian (musician)
- The Kingsmen
- Roy Head
- Bobby Freeman
- The Newbeats
- Billy Joe Royal
- The Association
- Glen Campbell
- P. J. Proby
- Chuck Berry
- Aretha Franklin
- The Clinger Sisters
- Tommy Leonetti
