= The Wizard of Odds =

- Genre: Game show
- Created by: Alan Thicke
- Presented by: Alex Trebek
- Announcer: John Harlan (pilot); Sam Riddle; Charlie O'Donnell
- Theme music composer: Stan Worth; Alan Thicke
- Country of origin: United States
- No. of episodes: 251

Production
- Producers: Burt Sugarman; Alan Thicke
- Running time: 22 minutes
- Production company: Burt Sugarman Productions

Original release
- Network: NBC
- Release: July 17, 1973 – June 28, 1974

The Wizard of Odds is an American television game show hosted by Alex Trebek that aired on NBC from July 17, 1973 to June 28, 1974. People from the studio audience vied in a number of rounds, primarily games revolving around statistical questions. John Harlan announced the pilot; Los Angeles radio personality Sam Riddle was the show's first announcer; towards the end of the run, Charlie O'Donnell replaced him.

== Broadcast history ==
Relatively short-lived, The Wizard of Odds replaced Sale of the Century with Joe Garagiola at 11:00 a.m. Eastern (10:00 Central). The show did not perform well against CBS' Gambit (later replaced by Now You See It with Jack Narz) and NBC dropped it after less than a year. The show was greenlit by Lin Bolen, who wanted to get rid of aging programming on obsolete sets, in favor of youth-centric programming.

The Wizard of Odds was Trebek's first American game show, after starting his broadcast career in his native Canada. He later hosted four more NBC games: High Rollers, from 1974 to 1976 and again as The New High Rollers from 1978 to 1980; Battlestars from 1981 to 1982 and again as The New Battlestars in 1983; Classic Concentration from 1987 to 1991; and To Tell the Truth in 1991. Beginning in 1984, he hosted the syndicated TV hit game Jeopardy! until his death in 2020.

=== Episode status ===
It is believed that the series was wiped, per network policy of the era, with NBC continuing this policy until 1979. The May 20, 1974 episode with special guest actor Don DeFore exists in the UCLA Film & Television Archive and was uploaded to YouTube in December 2025. An audio recording of the June 28 series finale also exists.

One surviving episode, labeled as airing on March 19, 1974, was uploaded to YouTube on October 12, 2022. A second episode, with a production date of May 8, 1974 and a slated air date of May 20, 1974 was uploaded to YouTube on December 24, 2025.

== Gameplay ==
Contestants were selected from the studio audience and answered questions based on statistical information, all for cash and prizes.

"The Wizard" (Trebek) began the show by choosing three contestants and asking them questions based on the law of averages, with cash and prizes awarded accordingly for correct answers; an example of a question was "What are the odds a man will recover his lost wallet if there is more than $20 inside it?"

The next three players were given a series of phrases and told to pick the one that did not match. The person with the most correct answers was given the chance to pick one of five prizes, located behind windows that were either "open" or "locked". This person could continue to play or stop at any time, keeping the prizes; however, selecting a window that was locked lost all prizes accumulated up to that point.

Every contestant selected had his or her name added to the "Wizard's Wheel of Fortune."

=== Wizard's Wheel of Fortune ===
At the end of the show, Trebek spun the wheel and the person it landed on was eligible for bonus gifts. A list of averages was then brought out, with a number above it. The contestant had to pick a group of items whose average added up to exactly the target number. If the contestant was correct, he or she won the bonus gifts, including a brand new car.

== Theme ==
The theme song was composed and sung by Alan Thicke, also from Canada, who was also one of the show's producers.

== Lawsuit ==
Nearly a week after the show debuted, Leo Guild (who has created numerous radio and television shows, books, and newspaper columns) filed a $2 million lawsuit against NBC for stealing his "Wizard of Odds" title, which had been used as a newspaper column during the late 1940s.
