= Bill Drake =

American radio personality (1937–2008)

Bill Drake (January 14, 1937 – November 29, 2008), born Philip Yarbrough, was an American radio programmer who co-developed the Boss Radio format with Gene Chenault via their company Drake-Chenault.

== Early career ==
Phil Yarbrough began his broadcast career in 1953, working part-time at WMGR in Bainbridge, Georgia (near his hometown of Donalsonville, Georgia). Following high school graduation, he attended Georgia Teachers College (Georgia Southern University today) in Statesboro, Georgia, on a basketball scholarship. His major was P.E., with the intention of teaching and coaching after graduation. While attending college, Yarbrough worked the evening shift at WWNS in Statesboro. After a knee injury in 1956, he lost his scholarship and left college for good. However, while attending college and working at the radio station, he met his future wife, Ramona Wall, who had also attended Georgia Teachers College. They both ended up in Atlanta and were married in 1959. Drake was hired by Bartell Broadcasting at its newly acquired Atlanta station, which acquired the call sign WAKE (a pairing with Bartell's Birmingham station, WYDE..."the wide awake stations"). Management proposed changing his name to Bill Blake (rhyming with 'wake'). Yarbrough protested. He proposed Phil Drake (his mother's maiden name). They settled on Bill Drake.

== Drake-Chenault ==
Later, at KYNO in Fresno, California, he met Gene Chenault, who became his business partner. Together, the pair developed influential radio programming strategies and tactics, as well as working with future "Boss Jocks" (their name for on-air radio talent).

Drake-Chenault streamlined the Top 40 radio format originally created by Todd Storz, Gordon McLendon and other radio programmers in the early 1950s. The format took a set list of popular songs and repeated them all day long. Jingles, news updates, traffic, and other features were designed to make Top 40 radio appeal to car listeners. By early 1964, the era of the British Invasion, Top 40 radio had become the dominant radio format for North American listeners and swept much of the Western world.

Drake applied modern methods such as market research and ratings demographics to the format to increase the number of listeners. He advocated limiting the amount of disc jockey chatter, the number of advertisements and playing only the top hits. Drake's concepts included 20/20 News and counter-programming with music sweeps. Drake-Chenault controlled aspects including the DJs that were hired, radio contests, visual logos, promotions, and commercial policy. He hired the Johnny Mann Singers to produce the Boss Radio jingles, which were bright, high-energy transitions from song to song.

Drake used these methods at Fresno's KYNO and then KGB, which moved from 14th to 1st in San Diego. In the spring of 1965, Drake-Chenault were hired by the then-financially-struggling KHJ in Los Angeles, after KGB's owner, Willett Brown, suggested to his fellow RKO board members that Drake could improve the station's performance. Drake hired Ron Jacobs as program director, Robert W. Morgan in the mornings and The Real Don Steele in the afternoons. Though "Boss Radio" was criticized, KHJ quickly jumped from near obscurity to the number one radio station in Los Angeles. Drake also programmed KFRC in San Francisco, WOR-FM in New York, KAKC in Tulsa, WHBQ in Memphis, WUBE (AM) in Cincinnati, WRKO in Boston and 50,000 watt CKLW, in Windsor, Ontario.

In the late 1960s and early 1970s, Drake and Chenault formed Drake-Chenault Inc., marketing the format via similar customized Johnny Mann jingle packages used on KHJ. These jingle packages were sold across the US and overseas. They also marketed "automated" radio format packages such as "Hit Parade", "Solid Gold", "Classic Gold" and "Great American Country". Disc Jockey voices heard on those formats included Robert W. Morgan, Charlie Van Dyke and others. Additionally, they marketed documentaries like The History of Rock and Roll, a 52-hour-long series on which Drake worked as a writer and narrator.

== After Drake-Chenault ==
Drake-Chenault was sold and eventually dissolved in the mid-1980s. In 1973, Drake left KHJ, along with Steele and Morgan, to program KIQQ-FM ("K-100") in Los Angeles. Bill Drake was a member of the nominating committee of the Hit Parade Hall of Fame. He was inducted into the Georgia Radio Hall of Fame in 2007.

Drake died of lung cancer in Los Angeles on November 29, 2008. Gene Chenault died at 90 on February 23, 2010.
