= KHJ-TV/FM Tower =

General information
- Type: Radio/TV transmission tower
- Location: Mount Wilson
- Coordinates: 34°13′38″N 118°4′3″W
- Completed: 1983
- Owner: CBS Corporation
- Height: 141.4 m (464 ft)

KHJ-TV/FM Tower (now known as KCAL-TV/KRTH Tower) is a 141.4-metre (464 ft) high self-supporting radio/television tower on Mount Wilson above Los Angeles, California, near the Mount Wilson Observatory. The KHJ-TV/FM Tower was built in 1983. It is owned by CBS Corporation and used by KCAL-TV (digital channel 9, 25,000 watts), KRTH (101.1 MHz, 51,000 watts), and KPWR (105.9 MHz, 25,000 watts).

== See also ==
- List of masts
