= KODV =

Spanish Christian radio station in Barstow, California

- Barstow, California; United States
- Broadcast area: Victor Valley
- Frequency: 89.1 MHz
- Branding: Ondas de Vida (in English: Waves of Life)

Programming
- Language: Spanish
- Format: Contemporary Christian

Ownership
- Owner: Ondas de Vida Network, Inc.

History
- Former call signs: KVID (2005–2006)

Technical information
- Licensing authority: FCC
- Facility ID: 122214
- Class: B
- ERP: 5,800 watts
- HAAT: 234 meters (768 ft)
- Transmitter coordinates: 34°58′17″N 117°2′22″W
- Translator: see below

Links
- Public license information: Public file; LMS
- Website: ondasdevida.com

KODV (89.1 FM) is a non-commercial, listener-supported radio station broadcasting a Spanish Contemporary Christian music format. Licensed to Barstow, California, United States, the station serves the Victor Valley area. It is owned by Ondas de Vida Network.

== Translators ==
KODV is rebroadcast by 11 FM translators in the Western United States and by low-power FM radio station KGBZ-LP in Madras, Oregon.

Broadcast translators for KODV
Call sign	Frequency	City of license	FID	ERP (W)	Class	FCC info	Notes
K205DK	88.9 FM	Yucca Valley, California	92058	10	D	LMS	—N/a
K211GC	90.1 FM	Barstow, California		80	D		—N/a
K212GC	90.3 FM	Pomona, California	91086	10	D	LMS	—N/a
K215FA	90.9 FM	North Las Vegas, Nevada	48349	75	D	LMS	—N/a
K216FE	91.1 FM	Crescent City, California	62069	162	D	LMS	—N/a
K219LJ	91.7 FM	St. George, Utah	152502	65	D	LMS	—N/a
K228CO	93.5 FM	Barstow, California	28845	6	D	LMS	Retransmits KODV's subcarrier as "Radio Católica La Consentida". Owned by Radio Católica La Consentida, Inc.
K256BS	99.1 FM	Palmdale, California	138849	10	D	LMS	—N/a
K284CD	104.7 FM	Quartz Hill, California	141344	7	D	LMS	—N/a
K288DJ	105.5 FM	Victorville, California	28939	10	D	LMS	—N/a
K300CW	107.9 FM	Indio, California	156199	10	D	LMS	—N/a
