= KGBZ-LP =

Low-power FM radio station in Madras, Oregon

- Madras, Oregon; United States
- Frequency: 102.5 MHz
- Branding: Ondas de Vida

Programming
- Language: Spanish
- Format: Religious

Ownership
- Owner: Central Oregon Educational Radio Corporation

History
- Former call signs: KHJA-LP (2002–2008)

Technical information
- Licensing authority: FCC
- Facility ID: 135771
- Class: L1
- ERP: 100 watts
- HAAT: −31.3 meters (−103 ft)
- Transmitter coordinates: 44°39′0″N 121°7′1″W

Links
- Public license information: LMS
- Website: ondasdevida.com

KGBZ-LP (102.5 FM, "Ondas de Vida") is a low-power radio station broadcasting a religious format. Licensed to Madras, Oregon, United States, the station is currently owned by Central Oregon Educational Radio Corporation. The station's programming originates at KODV in Barstow, California.
