= KFRC (610 AM) =

Radio station in San Francisco (1924–2005)

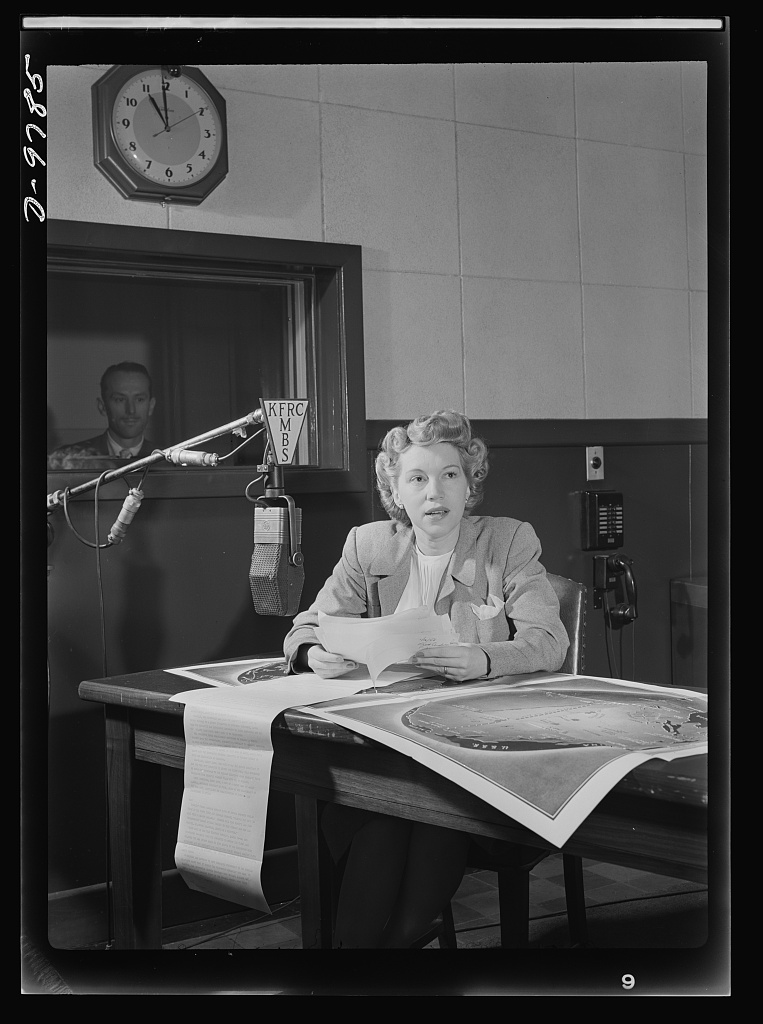
Ruth Anderson, San Francisco's only female radio news reporter, at work in the KFRC studio in February 1943

KFRC (610 AM) was a radio station in San Francisco, California. It first began broadcasting on September 24, 1924, from a studio in the Hotel Whitcomb at 1231 Market Street.

The station initially transmitted with 50 watts on a wavelength of 270 meters (≈ 1110 kHz), later moving to about 660 kHz in April 1927. On November 11, 1928, as part of the nationwide frequency reallocation, KFRC was assigned to 610 kHz — a frequency it would retain until 2005.

Over its long history, KFRC operated under various music and entertainment formats and co-owned FM sister stations. In 2005, the AM station was sold to Family Stations; at midnight on April 29, 2005, Family Stations began carrying its programming on 610 AM. On October 3, 2005, the station’s call letters were changed and the “KFRC” callsign was dropped from 610 AM.

The KFRC callsign and legacy continued: on May 17, 2007, the call sign was transferred to an FM station on 106.9 MHz by then-owner CBS Radio, reviving the classic-hits KFRC identity on the FM dial.

== Early history ==
KFRC's first manager was Harrison Holliway, an amateur radio operator. In 1920, Holliway operated his own amateur radio station with the call sign 6BN. He also worked as a part-time newspaper reporter, covering high school sporting news for the San Francisco Call.

During the summer of 1924, Holliway worked at a San Francisco radio shop called the Radio Art Corporation. A Western Electric salesman contacted the owners, Jim Threlkeld and Thomas Catton, and sold them on the idea of starting a new radio station and transmitter. KFRC was subsequently established with Holliway as the manager.

KFRC began broadcasting on September 24, 1924. Its programming featured speeches by local dignitaries followed by a program with concert, symphony, and dance orchestras. This included the Stanislas Bem Little Orchestra, led by Eugenia Argiewicz. The broadcast, transmitted at 50 watts, was reported to have been received as far as the U.S. Atlantic Coast and New Zealand.

In the following years, Holliway interviewed Rogers Hornsby, French-Canadian heavyweight boxer Jack Renault, and actors William S. Hart, Douglas Fairbanks, Jr., and John Barrymore.

== Don Lee Networks ==
In 1926, KFRC was purchased by Don Lee, a wealthy California distributor of Cadillac automobiles. His family owned the station for 25 years. In 1927, he purchased KHJ in Los Angeles and in 1929, both stations became affiliated with William S. Paley's Columbia Broadcasting System (CBS).

Meredith Willson made his radio debut on KFRC's Blue Monday Jamboree in 1928. Jack Benny's announcer, Don Wilson, began his radio career at KFRC. Others included Ralph Edwards, Art Van Horn, and Mark Goodson, who later collaborated with partner Bill Todman to create numerous radio and television game and quiz shows. Other personalities associated with KFRC during the Don Lee era were Art Linkletter, Mel Venter, Bea Benaderet, Harold Peary, Morey Amsterdam, Juanita Tennyson, Merv Griffin, and John Nesbitt.

Don Lee died in 1934, and his son took over management. KFRC and its sister station, KHJ in Los Angeles switched to the new Mutual Broadcasting System on December 29, 1936.

== 1950s and 1960s ==
In 1949, RKO-General acquired KFRC and the format evolved to feature relaxed "air personalities," playing the adult hits of the day (Frank Sinatra, Nat King Cole, Dean Martin, and similar). This format is sometimes referred to as Middle Of The Road (MOR). Air personalities included Bob Colvig doing the afternoon-drive show. At times, KFRC called itself "Frisco Radio." 1950s KFRC competitors with similar formats included KSFO, KNBC (formerly KPO, later KNBR), KGO and KROW (later KABL). Entering the 1960s, with the growth of Top 40 rock and roll radio, MOR stations had declining shares of listeners and revenue.

In the 1950s, like most radio stations, KFRC lost ratings and market share to television. So, in the early 1960s, the station switched to rock 'n' roll and entered what journalists considered its second "golden age," which coincided with the Summer of Love.

During the Drake era, KFRC was responsible for two memorable concerts. The station presented several prominent acts at "The Beach Boys Summer Spectacular" at the Cow Palace in San Francisco in June 1966. On June 10 and 11, 1967, KFRC organized and hosted the Fantasy Fair and Magic Mountain Music Festival at the summit of Mount Tamalpais in Marin County, California. The Fantasy Fair and Magic Mountain Music Festival took place one week before the Monterey Pop Festival. Some sources consider it among the earliest rock festivals.

In the late 1960s, KFRC-FM used one of the first computer-operated automation systems in the country.

=== Blocks ===
During its 1950s/1960s hits format, KFRC had blocks on various days of the week.

- Beatles Wednesday: an emphasis on Beatles music, particularly the songs before the release of Help!
- Motown Monday: an emphasis on artists like The Temptations and The Supremes

== 1970s and 1980s ==
Throughout the 1970s, the station had carefully programmed sound developed by RKO General's national program director, Bill Drake and program directors Tom Rounds and Les Turpin. It entered its second "golden era," which coincided with San Francisco's Summer of Love and featured legendary disc jockeys Mike Phillips, Ed Mitchell (who later changed his name to Ed Hepp), Bobby Dale, Jay Stevens, Sebastian Stone, K.O. Bayley (real name Bob Elliott), Dave Diamond, Charlie Van Dyke, Howard Clark, Dale Dorman, and Mark Elliott.

For several years, KFRC aired extended local newscasts on its AM station under the direction of news director Bob Safford. However, station management later decided to scale back news coverage, likely leading Safford and other members of the news staff to move to other broadcast outlets in San Francisco, including KCBS Radio and KGO-TV.

=== Dr. Don Rose, Magic 61 ===
From 1973 until 1986, Dr. Don Rose was KFRC's morning air radio personality. With earlier experience at WQXI (AM) in Atlanta, Georgia, and WFIL in Philadelphia, he was known for his one-liners and sound effects. This represented the overall morning zoo radio format and style.

With Dr. Don as anchor, the show had a supporting cast which included Bay Area Radio Hall of Fame inductee Jack Friday, Bobby Ocean, Rick Shaw, Dave Sholin, Harry Nelson, Terry Nelson, Bay Area Hall of Fame inductee Don Sainte-Johnn, "Marvelous" Mark McKay, and John Mack Flanagan. KFRC would be voted "Station of the Year" four times by Billboard Magazine. Rose became a prominent morning radio personality in the Bay Area during the final years of AM Top 40 radio. KFRC program directors during this period included Michael Spears, Les Garland, Gerry Cagle, and Mike Phillips.

In 1977, KFRC sold off its FM station at 106.1, programmed by Don Sainte-Johnn (to become KMEL).

=== 1970s and 1980s: News Department ===
KFRC operated a news department that received industry recognition. Some of the news anchors and reporters who worked at KFRC in the 70s and 80s included Ron Naso, B.R. Bradbury, Jo Interrante, Dave Cooke, Paul Fredricks, John Winters, Conni Gordon, and reporter, anchor, and later, News Director William Abbott. Known for his unique and confident style, Abbott would close each report with the station's signature, "This is William Abbott, KFRC 20/20 News".

The station began broadcasting in AM stereo in the early 1980s. Among the disc jockeys at KFRC during the 1980s were Chuck Geiger, future AT&T Park public-address announcer Renel Brooks-Moon, and future Los Angeles radio programmer Jack Silver, who would be the last voice heard when KFRC ended its Top 40 era. Technically, Don Sainte-Johnn was the last air personality on KFRC. Sainte-Johnn had been specifically hired for KFRC as an on-air personality.

With the decline of the Top 40 format by mid-decade, KFRC's programming was flipped on August 11, 1986, to an adult standards format, and was known as "Magic 61," while still broadcasting in stereo. The last song to be played before the change was "Lights" by Journey, which had also been used in KFRC's TV advertising.

== 1990s: Adding FM ==
In 1991, the station purchased KXXX 99.7. Previously, this frequency was owned by NBC, and had been KNBR-FM, and later KNAI, and finally KYUU before NBC closed its radio division in 1988.

Under KFRC, the FM signal at 99.7 was simulcast with the AM station at 610, which began on August 12, 1993.

Sign-on line up began after a weeklong taped segment talking about the history of Bay Area Radio. The first air talent line up included Harry Nelson, Chuck Geiger (a mainstay of KXXX), Brian Lee, and Jym Dingler in nights. Kevin "Pig Virus" Metheny stayed on from KXXX to be the first program Director.

Personalities included Ron Parker and Cammy Blackstone in the mornings, Don "The Sainte" Sainte-Johnn, Sue Hall, Bobby Ocean, Jeff Dean, Jack Friday, and Sylvia "Cha Cha" Chacon. Oldies program directors included Bob Hamilton of KRTH fame, Brian Thomas from 1994 to 2003, and Tim Marinville in 2003–04. Bob Harlow became the last PD to play oldies on KFRC.

== Sale of KFRC AM ==
Infinity Broadcasting sold the AM part of the station in 2005 for $35 million to Family Stations, the Christian broadcasting company that, as Family Radio, operates Christian radio station KEAR 106.9 FM.

=== Broadcast of Oakland A's Games ===
As of the year of the sale, 2005, the Oakland Athletics baseball team was the only sports tenant the previous few years on the AM side. By the end of 2005, the station's broadcasts of Oakland A's games ended.

=== New Call Letters ===
The AM station was anticipated to receive new call letters. The oldies format of KFRC AM and FM was scheduled to continue on the FM frequency.

The sale of the AM station came about as a result of the purchase of CBS' Sacramento television affiliate, KOVR, by Viacom, at the time the owner of both CBS and Infinity. Because KFRC's strong 5,000 watt AM signal from the Berkeley Marina was heard as a local station not only in San Francisco, but in Sacramento as well, the FCC required Infinity to sell either one of its Sacramento stations or a Bay Area station that had Sacramento as part of its city-grade coverage.

Gerry Cagle, who programmed KFRC in the early eighties, and now writes for Music Biz.com, commented in 2005:

KFRC wasn't a position on the dial. It was a place in the hearts of the many professionals who worked there to build and continue a legacy unmatched in radio. It was also a place in the hearts of the listeners who made it important in their lives. 610 means nothing. 'KFRC San Francisco with the Best Music!' will live forever in that magical place we all go when we think about the good things of the past.

The same year Family Stations sold their FM station to Infinity.

On April 29, 2005, Family Stations began simulcasting the signal of its FM station on 610 AM.

== Classic Hits KFRC ==
=== Timeline ===
In 1986, KFRC became an adult standards station known as Magic 61. In 1993, it returned to its oldies rock format.

In 2005, KFRC-FM moved its format ahead ten years, switching to a 1970s and 1980s music format.

In 2006, KFRC changed its format and closed its oldies broadcast with "American Pie" by Don McLean.

== Rhythmic Movin' 99.7 KFRC ==
At 10:03 a.m. on Friday, September 22, 2006, KFRC-FM changed its format to a Rhythmic Hot AC format. It rebranded as "The New Movin' 99.7 KFRC" with Gonna Make You Sweat by C+C Music Factory.

The "MOViN'" brand had previously been picked up by KQMV/Seattle, KMVN/Los Angeles, KYMV/Salt Lake City, KMVK/Dallas and WMVN/St. Louis.

The format switch was met with sharp criticism from long time listeners of KFRC because it was the last remaining oldies station in the region.

== KFRC callsign moves to 106.9 ==
This article may be confusing or unclear to readers. Please help clarify the article. There might be a discussion about this on the talk page. (November 2025) (Learn how and when to remove this message)

On Thursday, May 17, 2007, the KFRC-FM call sign moved to 106.9 FM, when CBS Radio discontinued the Free FM format in San Francisco. The station revived the classic hits format after the completion of that day's Oakland Athletics vs Kansas City Royals game.

106.9 continued hosting the Oakland Athletics. The A's left it for KYCY 1550 AM and then 106.9 FM. MOViN' 99.7 continues on under the call sign KMVQ-FM.

On October 27, 2008, at 7:40 AM, KCBS 740 AM began simulcasting on 106.9 FM, which still has the call letters KFRC-FM. KFRC-HD2 (on 106.9-2 FM) continues a classic hits format: music hits of the 1960s through the 1980s.

== Reincarnation at 1550 AM ==
It was announced on December 22, 2008, that starting on New Year's Day 2009, KYCY 1550 AM would switch to an oldies music format courtesy of Scott Shannon's "The True Oldies Channel" (programmed by ABC Radio), using the KFRC callsign. This incarnation of KFRC ended on September 1, 2011, when it became Indian-targeted KZDG.

== Annual top 100 songs ==
On New Year's Eve and New Year's Day, KFRC would count down its top 100 songs of the past year. Its number one songs, by year, were the following:

Year	Song	Artist
1965	(I Can't Get No) Satisfaction	The Rolling Stones
1966	Cherish	The Association
1967	Light my Fire	The Doors
1968	Hey Jude	The Beatles
1969	Sugar, Sugar	The Archies
1970	(They Long to Be) Close to You	The Carpenters
1971	It's Too Late	Carole King
1972	Alone Again (Naturally)	Gilbert O'Sullivan
1973	Superstition	Stevie Wonder
1974	Seasons in the Sun	Terry Jacks
1975	Love Will Keep Us Together	Captain and Tennille
1976	Silly Love Songs	Paul McCartney and Wings
1977	Dreams	Fleetwood Mac
1978	Night Fever	Bee Gees
1979	The Logical Song	Supertramp
1980	Call Me	Blondie
1981	Bette Davis Eyes	Kim Carnes
1982	I Love Rock and Roll	Joan Jett & the Blackhearts
1983	Every Breath You Take	The Police
1984	Jump	Van Halen
1985	The Power of Love	Huey Lewis and the News
