= KHJ (AM) =

Relevant Radio network station in Los Angeles

Coordinates: 34°05′08″N 118°15′27.3″W

- Los Angeles, California; United States
- Broadcast area: Los Angeles metropolitan area
- Frequency: 930 kHz
- Branding: Relevant Radio

Programming
- Language: English
- Format: Catholic radio
- Affiliations: Relevant Radio

Ownership
- Owner: Relevant Radio, Inc.

History
- First air date: April 13, 1922; 104 years ago
- Former call signs: KHJ (1922–1986); KRTH (1986–1990); KKHJ (1990–2000)
- Former frequencies: 833 kHz (1922); 750 & 619 kHz (1922–1923); 760 kHz (1923–1925); 740 kHz (1925–1927); 720 kHz (1927–1928); 750 kHz (1928); 900 kHz (1928–1941)
- Call sign meaning: Randomly assigned, later adopted the backronym slogan "Kindness, Happiness, and Joy"

Technical information
- Licensing authority: FCC
- Facility ID: 37224
- Class: B
- Power: 5,000 watts

Links
- Public license information: Public file; LMS
- Webcast: Listen Live
- Website: relevantradio.com

KHJ (930 kHz) is a commercial AM radio station that is licensed to Los Angeles, California. Owned and operated by Relevant Radio, Inc., the station broadcasts Roman Catholic religious programming as the network's West Coast flagship station.

KHJ broadcasts at 5,000 watts, with a non-directional signal by day but using a directional antenna at night to protect other stations on 930 AM. KHJ's transmitter is triplexed to three of the six towers of KBLA (1580 AM), near the intersection of Sunset Boulevard and Alvarado Street in the Echo Park neighborhood of Los Angeles. Radio station KYPA (1230 AM) also uses two of KBLA's towers for its signal. KHJ's former towers at the intersection of Venice Boulevard and Fairfax Avenue in Mid-City were removed in February 2013.

KHJ was a top 40 station from 1965 to 1980. The station switched to a country music format in 1980 and back to pop music in 1983. In 1986, KHJ changed its call letters to KRTH, adopting an oldies format as a sister station to KRTH-FM (101.1 FM). Three years later, the station was sold to Liberman Broadcasting who aired Spanish-language formats from 1990 to 2014, using the call letters KKHJ until 2000, when it regained its original calls.

== History ==
=== 1920s and 1930s ===
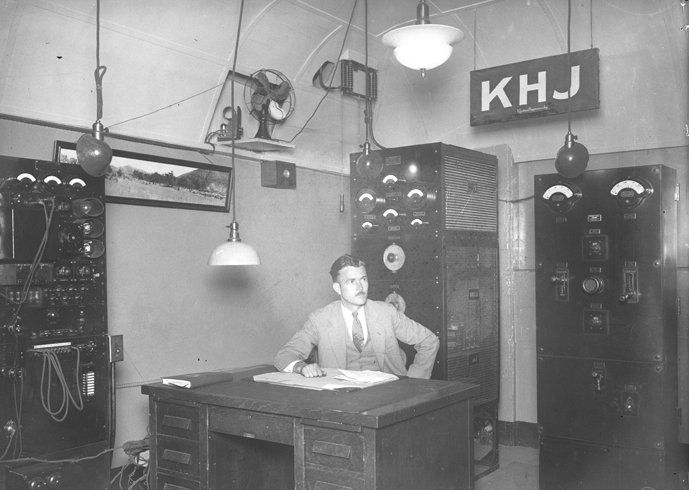
Ernest G. Underwood at the KHJ studios, 1927

Effective December 1, 1921, the U.S. government adopted regulations formally defining "broadcasting stations". The wavelength of 360 meters (833 kHz) was designated for entertainment broadcasts, while 485 meters (619 kHz) was reserved for broadcasting official weather and other government reports.

KHJ was first licensed on March 18, 1922, to C. R. Kierulff & Company in Los Angeles, for operation on the 360 meter entertainment wavelength. The Kierulff company acted as contractors responsible for installing the station in the Los Angeles Times building at First and Broadway, and in November the newspaper's owner, the Times Mirror Company, became the official licensee. The KHJ call letters were randomly assigned from a roster of available call signs, although the station quickly adopted the slogan "Kindness, Happiness and Joy". Test transmissions began on April 8. The station's formal debut broadcast was held on April 13 from 6:45 to 7:45 p.m., featuring, in the words of the newspaper, "the powerful baritone voice of Joseph Schwarz of the Chicago Grand Opera Company in the prologue from 'I Pagliacci', and a dulcet tonal treat by Edith Mason, diva of the same company, and flashing the news of the world to the Southwest".

1922 saw a rapid expansion in the number of broadcasting stations, most sharing the single entertainment wavelength of 360 meters, which required progressively more complicated time sharing schedules among stations in the same region. In September 1922 the Department of Commerce set aside a second entertainment wavelength, 400 meters (750 kHz) for "Class B" stations that had quality equipment and programming, and KHJ was assigned to this more exclusive wavelength, where it was later joined, on a timesharing basis, by KFI. Along with the 400 meter authorization, KHJ was also authorized to broadcast on the 485 meter "market and weather reports" wavelength. In May 1923 additional "Class B" frequencies were made available, with Los Angeles allocated 640 and 760 kHz, and KHJ was assigned to 760 kHz, while KFI moved to 640 kHz.

In early 1925, KHJ was assigned to 740 kHz. The Federal Radio Commission (FRC) was formed in early 1927. That fall it moved KHJ to 720 kHz, and in early 1928 the station was reassigned to 750 kHz. On November 11, 1928, the FRC made a major reallocation under the provisions of its General Order 40, which moved KHJ to 900 kHz, a frequency designated for "regional" service, with 1,000 watts of power

For a short time during the late 1920s and early 1930s KHJ was the Los Angeles affiliate and West Coast production hub of the fledgling CBS radio network, the originating station for Bing Crosby's first national network radio show in 1931. On April 29, 1934, the cartoon character Donald Duck made his first appearance, on the California Melodies radio program of KHJ, a few days before he debuted in animated form in the Silly Symphony short The Wise Little Hen. CBS would eventually purchase a more-powerful West Coast flagship station, 50,000-watt KNX, and part company with KHJ. The station was purchased in the fall of 1927 by Don Lee, a local automobile dealer who also owned KFRC (610 AM) in San Francisco and eventually accumulated 21 radio stations. In 1949, the broadcasting company, including KHJ, merged with RKO General.

On December 18, 1934, KHJ was one of four stations granted permission to increase power to 5,000 watts. In 1941, a major reorganization of the AM band by the Federal Communications Commission (FCC, successor to the FRC), due to the implementation of the North American Regional Broadcasting Agreement, moved the station to 930 kHz, where it continues to operate.

During Lee's ownership KHJ became the West Coast flagship station of the Mutual Broadcasting System, one of the "big four" radio networks (with CBS, NBC, and ABC) from the 1930s to the 1970s. George Burns, Gracie Allen, and Steve Allen appeared on KHJ, and at one point the station employed a 50-piece orchestra to accompany its musical guests. On a 1931 broadcast (a portion of which survives) KHJ introduced an up-and-coming singer, Bing Crosby. Pat Weaver (president of NBC, creator of The Today Show and The Tonight Show, and father of Sigourney Weaver) was a KHJ announcer.

Throughout the 1950s, before becoming a successful television game show host, Bob Barker, along with his wife, Dorothy Jo, hosted a weekly audience participation show, sponsored by Southern California Edison Company. Dorothy Jo Barker also served as the program's producer, and sang the commercial jingles for the power company. It was on this program where Bob was discovered by emcee Ralph Edwards, who hired him to host a daytime version of Truth or Consequences starting on New Year's Eve, 1956, which lasted for almost two decades, and which led to his 35 years as host of The Price is Right, starting in 1972 until his retirement in 2007.

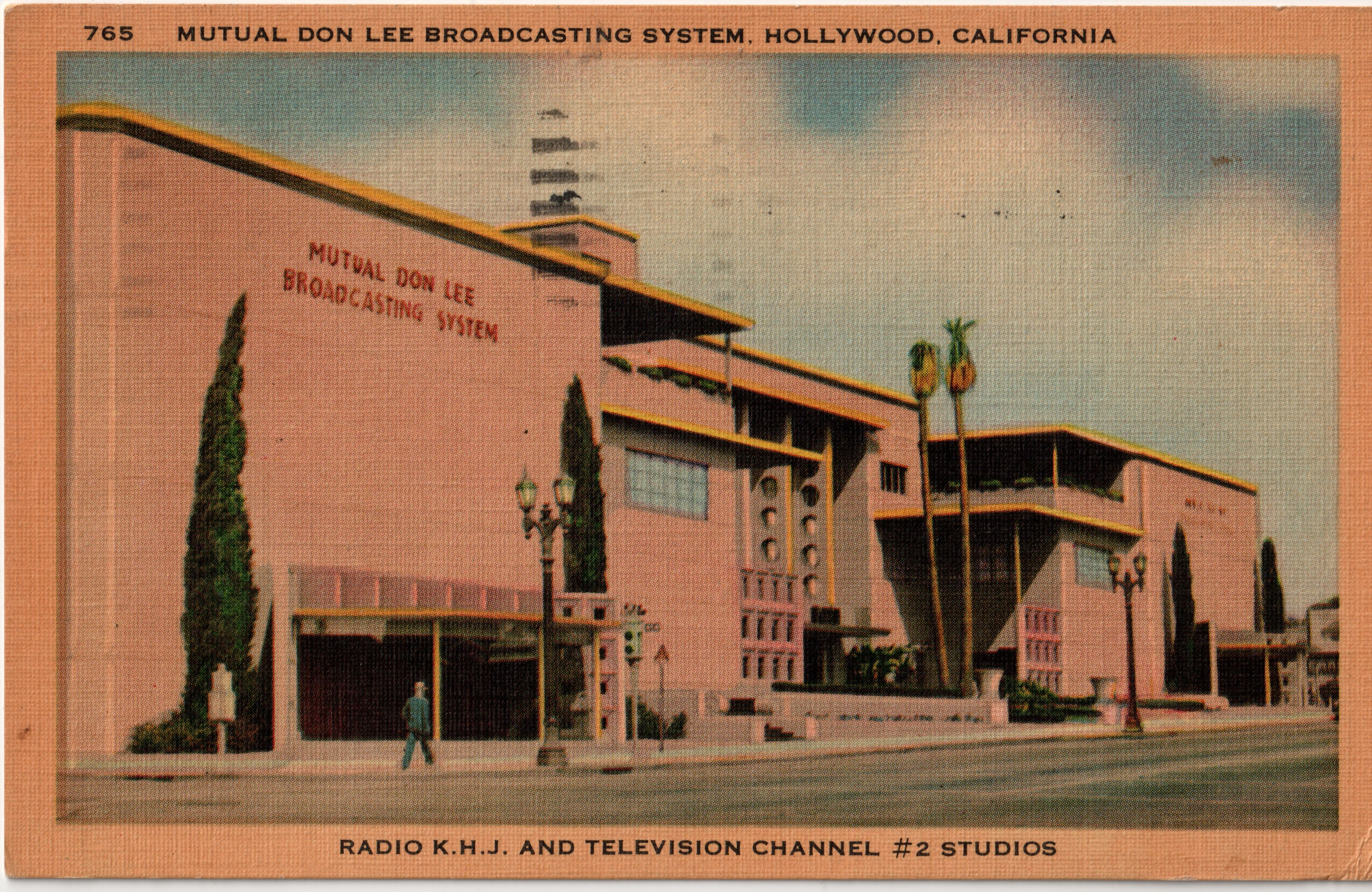
KHJ studios about 1950

=== "Boss Radio" ===
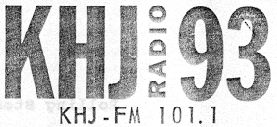
KHJ logo when simulcast on 101.1 FM, used from 1963 to 1965

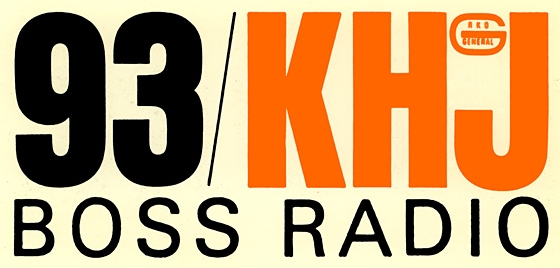
Logo used during the "Boss Radio" era.

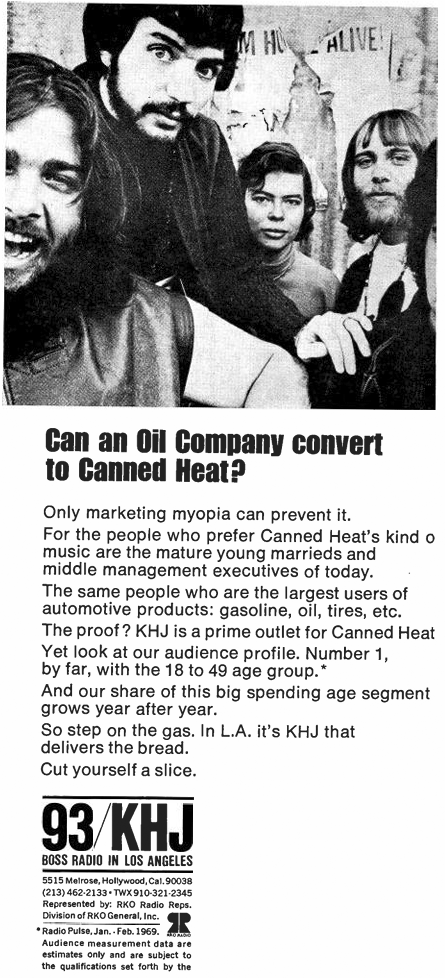
1969 station advertisement.

In April 1965, programming consultant Bill Drake crafted KHJ's contemporary hit radio format. Drake hired program director Ron Jacobs, who had created formats in Hawaii and California. The format, known as "Boss Radio", featured a restricted playlist and restrained commentary by announcers (although a few, such as Robert W. Morgan, Charlie Tuna, Humble Harve Miller, and The Real Don Steele, were allowed to develop on-air personas). Other DJs from this era (1965–1980) included Roger Christian, Gary Mack, Dave Diamond, Beau Weaver, John Leader, Sam Riddle, Johnny Williams, Frank Terry, Johnny Mitchell, Tommy Vance, Scotty Brink, Steve Clark, Bobby Tripp, Tom Maule, and Bill Wade. One defining characteristic of Boss Radio was the jingles by the Johnny Mann Singers. Drake's format spread throughout North America, bringing high ratings to KFRC in San Francisco, WFIL in Philadelphia, KGB in San Diego, WQXI in Atlanta, WRKO in Boston, and CKLW in Windsor, Ontario, Canada (serving Detroit). Drake and his business partner Gene Chenault brought many of their announcers from the other Boss stations, using those stations as a farm system to develop talent.

KHJ's call-in request number used the Los Angeles area code 213 and a 520 exchange, followed by the current year. During the late 1970s and early 1980s, the station competed with three other local stations with similar formats: KFI, KTNQ, and Tijuana-based border blaster XETRA-AM (The Mighty 690). KHJ also competed with three "soul radio" stations serving the Los Angeles radio market: KDAY, KGFJ, and, from Rosarito, Mexico, XERB.

In mid-1970, a KHJ contest led to a fatality and a large legal judgment against RKO General. That summer, the station ran a series of contests known as the "Super Summer Spectacular". In the contests, the Real Don Steele drove a red car to a particular area and announcers encouraged listeners to find him with clues as to his whereabouts. The first person who found Steele and fulfilled a condition received a cash prize and was interviewed by Steele. The conditions varied, from answering a question to possessing certain items of clothing. An example of an on-air clue was: "The Real Don Steele is moving into Canoga Park — so be on the lookout for him. I'll tell you what will happen if you get to The Real Don Steele. He's got twenty-five dollars to give away if you can get it ... and baby, all signed and sealed and delivered and wrapped up." At the time, KHJ had the largest teenage audience in the Los Angeles area (48 percent, compared to its nearest competitor's 13 percent).

On July 16, 1970, two teenagers, following Steele in separate cars, drove at speeds up to 80 miles per hour (130 km/h) so they could be closest to him when the next clue was announced. One of the teenagers forced another motorist, 32-year-old Ronald Weirum, off the road; Weirum was killed when his car overturned. Weirum's wife and children filed a wrongful-death suit against both teenagers, the manufacturer of Weirum's car, and RKO General. One of the teenagers settled the case before the trial for the limits of his insurance policy. A jury found in favor of the car's manufacturer, but found both the second teenager and RKO General liable for the accident and awarded the plaintiffs $300,000 in damages. RKO General appealed to the California Supreme Court, which upheld the verdict in 1975. The higher court ruled that KHJ negligently created an undue risk to the public by causing a situation in which its listeners were encouraged to race on the roads, and that there was sufficient evidence for the jury to find that the contest's risk of harm to the public (including Weirum) was foreseeable.

=== End of an era ===
The format brought high ratings to the station until the late 1970s, when FM radio became the dominant form of music broadcasting. On November 7, 1980, at 9 p.m., during Bob Shannon's show, and after the song "Rock and Roll (I Gave You the Best Years of My Life)" by Mac Davis was played, KHJ switched from top 40 to a country music format with the slogan "We all grew up to be cowboys". The change attempted to capitalize on the rise of pop-driven country, a trend driven in part by the film Urban Cowboy which was released that year. In April 1982, KHJ began broadcasting in AM stereo using the Kahn-Hazeltine independent sideband system. However, that format lasted only three years. On April 1, 1983, KHJ switched to an oldies format: "The Boss is Back", featuring the original Johnny Mann Singers' Boss Radio jingles. In 1984, KHJ launched "Car Radio 93", a top 40 variant targeting driving commuters, featuring traffic reports every ten minutes.

On the evening of January 31, 1986, "Car Radio" DJ Dave Sebastian Williams was joined in the studio by Robert W. Morgan. Participants in KHJ's Boss Radio heyday (DJs M.G. Kelly, Bobby Ocean, and Jimmy Rabbitt, and program director Ron Jacobs) phoned in for a farewell broadcast, playing the songs which had made KHJ a popular AM station in the 1960s and 1970s. The last song played on KHJ was "Rock Around the Clock" by Bill Haley & His Comets. On February 1, at Midnight, the station adopted new call letters KRTH to match those of its FM sister station and a format known as "Smokin' Oldies", featuring hits from the rock and roll era's first decade. The station used "AM 930" as its moniker. With the format change, RKO General dismissed about two dozen staff members from both stations.

=== Switch to Spanish and call-sign problem ===
Logo for KKHJ/KHJ as "La Ranchera 930".

RKO General had been under investigation by federal regulators since the 1960s for unethical conduct at its television stations, including KRTH's television sister KHJ-TV. The company was eventually ruled an unfit broadcast licensee and was compelled by the FCC to sell its broadcast properties. In January 1989, RKO sold KRTH-AM-FM to Beasley Broadcasting for $86.6 million. That October, Beasley spun off the AM station to Liberman Broadcasting for $23 million; this transaction closed in March 1990. During this period, KRTH dropped the "Smokin' Oldies" format and simulcasted KRTH-FM's broad-based oldies format. Upon closing, KRTH became a full-time Spanish-language station broadcasting a regional Mexican music format branded "Radio Alegria". Liberman changed the station's call letters to KKHJ, in honor of its history as KHJ. From November 1997 to January 1999, KKHJ aired a Spanish all-news radio format, the only one of its kind in the United States. The station's ratings suffered, prompting a return to regional Mexican as "La Ranchera".

Program director Alfredo Rodriguez and chief engineer Jerry Lewine wished to bring back the original KHJ call sign; however, the FCC stopped issuing three-letter call signs to radio stations in the 1930s. Rodriguez and Lewine conceived a plan to convince the FCC to change the station's call sign. Since the Spanish pronunciation of KKHJ's first two letters ("kah-kah") sounded like caca (slang for "feces"), the call letters were pronounced in English for a decade. This was considered awkward for a Hispanophone broadcaster, so the station collected letters from listeners and lobbied the FCC to allow the station to drop one of its letters. The commission allowed the station to return to its original call, KHJ, on March 15, 2000.

On August 21, 2007, the Los Angeles Dodgers reached a deal with KHJ to broadcast the team's games in Spanish for the 2008 season, moving from KWKW after 20 years there.

=== Switch to Catholic Radio format ===
On July 15, 2014, Liberman reached an agreement to sell KHJ to IHR Educational Broadcasting for $9.75 million; the sale was consummated on November 6. At that time, KHJ began Catholic-oriented religious programming; the "La Ranchera" format moved to KWIZ (96.7 FM) in Santa Ana, California. The format change marked the station returning to English-language programming.

KHJ switched to the Relevant Radio branding when IHR Educational Broadcasting and Starboard Media Foundation consummated their merger on June 30, 2017. On May 2, 2018, the FCC granted Immaculate Heart Media's request to switch KHJ's license from non-commercial educational to commercial status.

== Legacy ==
A low-power FM (LPFM) station in Madras, Oregon, KHJA-LP (102.1 FM), aired an oldies format as a tribute to the 1960s–1970s era KHJ and used the Los Angeles station's logo, jingles, and "Boss Radio" slogans. (In 2008, it changed its call sign to KGBZ-LP and started re-broadcasting a Spanish Christian network called "Ondas de Vida" from California.) In 2016, a new LPFM in Albany, Oregon, was issued the call sign KHJJ-LP on a frequency of 105.3 FM. It adopted the nickname KHJFM as a tribute to the original "93 KHJ" as programmed by Bill Drake. Los Angeles area "Boss Jocks" who worked at the original 93 KHJ are heard on this station.

WKHJ (104.5 FM), a hot adult contemporary station in Mountain Lake Park, Maryland, has always used the "KHJ" nickname. In Fredericton, New Brunswick, Canada, country station CKHJ used the moniker KHJ until 2019, when it rebranded as "Pure Country".

The KKHJ call sign used during the 1990s by Liberman was assigned to an FM station in American Samoa. That station broadcasts on 93.1 FM and uses the "93 KHJ" on-air name and jingles.

An aircheck sample of an old KHJ jingle is heard at the beginning of "AM Radio" by Everclear. Harry Chapin, on his Greatest Stories Live album, refers to KHJ in "WOLD" ("I am the morning DJ at 93 KHJ, playing all the hits for you, play them night and day") to the audience's delight; the song was probably recorded in a location served by KHJ.

The 2019 film Once Upon a Time in Hollywood features the Boss Radio era of KHJ. The movie and official soundtrack album include airchecks of boss jocks Humble Harve and The Real Don Steele as well as original 93 KHJ jingles and advertisements.

== See also ==
- List of initial AM-band station grants in the United States
- List of three-letter broadcast call signs in the United States
