= Robert W. Morgan =

American disc jockey (1937–1998)

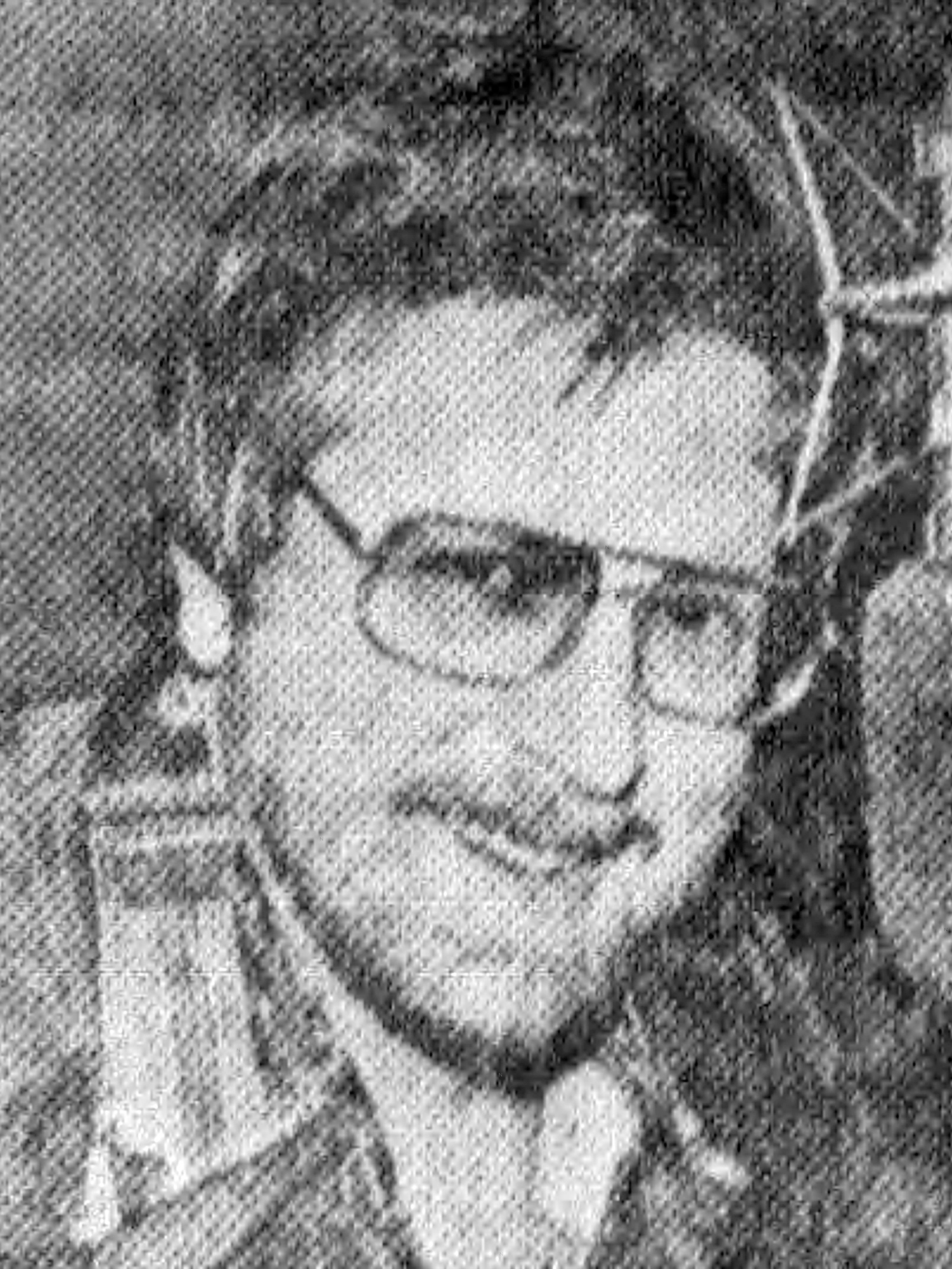
- Morgan in 1980
- Born: Robert Wilbur Morgan; July 23, 1937; Galion, Ohio, U.S.
- Died: May 22, 1998 (aged 60); Tarzana, California, U.S.
- Presenting career
- Stations: KHJ (AM); KMPC (AM); KIQQ (FM); KMGG (FM); KRTH (FM)
- Style: Disc Jockey

Robert Wilbur Morgan (July 23, 1937 – May 22, 1998) was an American radio personality best known for his work at several stations in Los Angeles, California, in particular KHJ-AM.

Morgan also did morning drive at KMPC-AM, KIQQ-FM and KMGG-FM, and finished his career at KRTH-FM, where he retired for health reasons in 1997. He died from lung cancer on May 22, 1998.

== Biography ==
=== Early years ===
As a youth growing up in Galion, Ohio, Morgan's interest was piqued while listening to his favorite DJs on Cleveland's top forty giant KYW (then on 1100 AM before they moved to Philadelphia) which would eventually lead to his first on-air job at College of Wooster in 1955 on WWST & WWST-FM, for an initial salary of $1 per hour.

In 1959 Morgan moved from college radio to KACY Port Hueneme (Ventura), California where he hosted the overnight show called Kegler's Spare Time with Bob Morgan live from the Wagon Wheel Bowl before moving on to a succession of brief stints beginning in 1961 at KTEE Carmel as the second half of a two-man classical music program with Bob Elliott, a Marine Corps Heavyweight Champion who later went on to radio fame as "K.O. Bailey," then a short time later as the morning drive DJ and mid-day board-op for the Arthur Godfrey Show at KMBY, Monterey, then a jump to KOMY Watsonville, then back to KMBY Monterey followed in 1962 with a stint at "K-MAKE", KMAK, Fresno where he first worked with program director Ron Jacobs. This was followed in 1963 by an eight-month stay at KROY Sacramento before finally landing his first major-market job in 1964 at KEWB, Oakland-San Francisco. It was here that he met and worked with his lifelong friend "The Real" Don Steele.

On April 27, 1965, Morgan, Steele, and programmer Ron Jacobs joined the staff of KHJ-AM in Los Angeles. At the time, the station’s programming was being directed by Bill Drake, who, along with a group of on-air personalities known as the “Boss Jocks,” reshaped the station’s format and presentation. The changes contributed to KHJ-AM’s strong position in the Los Angeles radio market.

Morgan became one of the original “Boss Jocks” on 93/KHJ and worked during a period when the station was a leading Top 40 outlet in Southern California from 1965 to 1973. His on-air phrases, including “Good Morgan Boss Angeles!” and “Arise and Morganize,” were regularly used during his morning broadcasts. In addition to his shift work, he also recorded station promotional material and imaging for KHJ.

In 1969, Morgan co-produced and narrated The History of Rock and Roll, a 48-hour radio documentary. Developed with Bill Drake and Gene Chenault, the program traced the development of rock and roll from the early 1950s forward and was distributed widely for broadcast.

In 1969–70, Morgan hosted the final year of The Groovy Show on KHJ's sister television station KHJ, Channel 9, in Los Angeles.

In 1970 Morgan made a surprise move from Los Angeles to WIND Radio Chicago where he remained in the morning slot until finally being enticed back to his KHJ morning show in 1972.

Until his departure from KHJ in October 1970, Morgan had commanded unparalleled radio ratings in Los Angeles. Morgan's return to his former time slot in L.A., saw a significant spike upward for KHJ until he departed just a year later.

== Post-KHJ ==
In 1973, Morgan and Steele walked out of KHJ and joined Bill Drake six months later at KIQQ-FM, Los Angeles. The ratings were sub-par, though, causing Morgan to leave the morning slot a year and a half later for weekends and fill in slots at the prestigious KMPC Los Angeles. He did that for four years before legendary morning man Dick Whittinghill retired in 1980, allowing Morgan to go back to mornings. He stayed at KMPC until May 1984. After a short stint at KMGG from May 1984 until January 1986, Morgan returned to KMPC. Morgan also appeared on television as host of several variety shows, including Morgan's Alley, ABC’s In Concert, NBC’s The Helen Reddy Show, and KHJ-TV’s Groovy Show, which he co-hosted with teen model Kam Nelson. Morgan was also the announcer for Solid Gold throughout most of the 1980s.

Morgan was heard in 1973 on Saturday night segments of the long-running NBC Radio program Monitor, an attempt to freshen that program's image. During the mid to late 70s, Morgan also did his own one-hour radio weekly special highlighting one artist or group per show. "Robert W. Morgan's Special of the Week" was often played on radio stations that also carried Casey Kasem's American Top 40 as the same company, Watermark, distributed both. In fact, on the weekends of February 8, 1975, and September 29, 1979, he hosted both shows on the same weekend as he subbed for Casey on AT40 in addition to hosting his own SOTW. Morgan is one of only three substitute hosts to have filled in on both a three-hour and a four-hour AT40 (Bruce Phillip Miller and Morgan's ex-fellow KHJ jock Mark Elliott are the other two); in fact he recorded his 1979 AT40 episode in over 40 minutes, faster than any episode hosted by a regular or substitute host.

== End of career ==
The year 1992 would signal the twilight years of Morgan's distinguished radio broadcast career when he signed on as morning show host of "oldies" K-EARTH 101, where he again enjoyed solid ratings in the Los Angeles market before announcing in May 1997 that he was suffering from lung cancer. According to L.A. radio personality Bob Shannon, Morgan told his listeners, "It could have something to do with the two-packs-a-day cigarette habit I had for the last 35 years." In an emotional on-air statement, Morgan stated that he was taking some time off to fight the disease full-time. His friend and colleague Don Steele died of lung cancer in August 1997. Morgan continued to do broadcasts from his home studio until 1998.

On January 9, 1998, K-EARTH 101 held a retirement tribute for Morgan at the Museum of Television and Radio in Beverly Hills. The tribute included a re-dedication of his Star on the Hollywood Walk Of Fame, and a three-hour broadcast from the museum's theater, hosted by Gary Owens and Morgan's KRTH co-host, Joni Caryl. It concluded with a thirty-minute retrospective on Morgan's career, narrated by Dick Clark. Morgan died on May 22, 1998. He was 60 years old. Morgan was married twice and was survived by a daughter.

== Awards ==
In addition to receiving Billboard magazine's Air Personality of the Year award in 1967, Morgan was awarded the Gavin Professional Programmer's Man of the Year Award, a citation from the National Association of Broadcasters for "Significant Achievement in American Broadcasting," and unanimous election to the Ohio Broadcasters' Hall of Fame. Samples of his work are on permanent display at the Museum of Broadcasting in New York City, the Museum of Television & Radio in Beverly Hills and the International Broadcasting Congress archives in Brussels. He also has a Star on the Hollywood Walk of Fame, just outside the Dolby Theatre complex on the corner of Hollywood and Highland.
