= Don Steele =

American disc jockey (1936–1997)

- Steele at KHJ in 1965
- Born: Donald Steele Revert; April 1, 1936; Los Angeles, California, U.S.
- Died: August 5, 1997 (aged 61); Los Angeles, California, U.S.
- Spouse: Shaune McNamara Steele
- Career
- Stations: KBUC (AM) - Corona, California; KEPR (AM) - Kennewick, Washington; KIMA (AM) - Yakima, Washington; KXLY (AM) - Spokane, Washington; KOIL (AM) - Omaha, Nebraska; KISN (AM) - Portland, Oregon; KEWB (AM) - San Francisco; KHJ (AM) - Los Angeles; KIQQ (FM) - Los Angeles; KTNQ (AM) - Los Angeles; KRLA (AM) - Los Angeles; KCBS-FM - Los Angeles; KRTH (FM) - Los Angeles
- Style: Disc jockey

Don Steele (born Donald Steele Revert; April 1, 1936 – August 5, 1997) was an American disc jockey and one of the most popular disc jockeys in the United States from the middle of the 1960s until his retirement for health reasons in May 1997. He was better known as "The Real Don Steele," a name suggested by his program director, Steve Brown, at KOIL-AM in Omaha, Nebraska. Brown hoped the moniker would click with listeners and make him stand out from other radio personalities.

== Early life ==
Born in the Hollywood neighborhood of Los Angeles, Steele graduated from Hollywood High School, served in the United States Air Force and then studied at a local radio school, the Don Martin School of Broadcasting, where he also taught for a short time.

== Career ==
=== Early career ===
Shortly thereafter, Steele began his radio career working outside of L.A. at a small station, KBUC in Corona, California, then moving on to KEPR Kennewick, KIMA Yakima and KXLY Spokane, all in Washington; KOIL Omaha, Nebraska; KISN Portland, Oregon, and KEWB Oakland/San Francisco before returning to Los Angeles to help kick off what would become one of the most influential radio stations in the country, 93/KHJ, Boss Radio, in April 1965.

=== National prominence ===
Steele became nationally known as a DJ on radio station KHJ in Los Angeles, where he helped to promote the "ultrahip" top-40 Boss Radio format which began at 3pm on April 27, 1965. He also appeared on TV as host of Boss City and The Real Don Steele TV Show, a show which ran from 1965 to 1975 on KHJ-TV channel 9 in Los Angeles. When the popularity of AM radio gave way to FM stereo in the 1970s, Steele continued to remain a popular personality at the station. Following the years at 93/KHJ, The Real Don Steele continued to be heard on Los Angeles radio stations, including KIQQ (K-100), KTNQ (Ten-Q), KRLA, KCBS-FM and KRTH-FM (K-Earth 101), until his death in August 1997.

In the book Los Angeles Radio People, Steele recalled the beginnings of Boss Radio in 1965: "We were standing literally at ground zero, then (the radio format) became a huge giant. It was like a mushroom cloud that went up -- heavy on the mushroom."

Steele also gained additional notoriety due to an ill-fated promotion which KHJ undertook on behalf of his show during the summer of 1970. The promotion was dubbed a “Super Summer Spectacular” and involved Steele driving around the Los Angeles-area in a flashy red car. Throughout the day, KHJ would broadcast clues about Steele's location, and listeners who successfully tracked him down would receive cash prizes of about $25, equal to $207 today. On July 16, 1970, two teenagers attempting to track Steele by car at speeds of roughly 80 miles per hour (130 km/h) forced another car into a highway center divider, causing the death of Ronald Weirum. Weirum's family sued various parties, including KHJ, asserting that the tragedy was a foreseeable consequence of the recklessness inherent to the nature of the "Super Summer Spectacular" promotion. The family's lawsuit eventually reached the Supreme Court of California, which held for the plaintiffs. The Court's opinion in the case, Weirum v. RKO General, Inc., has since become a well-known holding on the subject of foreseeability in torts law, and is often studied in American law schools.

One of Steele's ongoing on-air bits was the refrain, "Tina Delgado is alive, alive!" Legends grew as to the meaning of the phrase, but Steele never did reveal what it really meant, or who the girl was who uttered the words.

The Real Don Steele stayed at KHJ until June 1973, then moved on to L.A. radio stations KIQQ, KTNQ, KRLA, KODJ / KCBS and arrived at KRTH in July 1982. He recorded commercials and at one time had a successful, nationally syndicated radio show. He is also the DJ on Cheap Trick's "On the Radio" ("Heaven Tonight"). His career took a dive in the mid-1980s, at which time a copywriter directing him as a voiceover for a Sea World radio spot introduced him to legendary voice actor Ernie Anderson. On hearing Steele in the booth, Anderson immediately connected Steele to his agent. Within weeks, Steele was back on top with a drive time slot at KRTH-FM in Los Angeles.

That show, "Live From the 60's", was created by Steele along with friend and contemporary M.G."Machine Gun" Kelly, who followed Steele at KHJ-AM, then DJ'd with him in the '70s at 10Q. "Live From the 60's" was a three-hour program that featured oldies exclusively from the 1960s. Each hour of the show profiled a certain year from that decade. It was written and performed in present tense, and peppered with audio clips of news events, presidential speeches and TV shows that correlated with that particular year. The show ran in syndication, and was marketed and picked up by over 200 radio stations with an "Oldies" format from 1988 until 1993. Repeats of earlier shows aired in some markets as late as 1996. In July 2015, "Live From the 60's with The Real Don Steele" was placed back into three hour re-run syndication for AM/FM and Podcasting radio stations.

== Death ==
Steele died of lung cancer on August 5, 1997, at the age of 61.

== Recognitions ==
A poll seeking the top 10 disc jockeys in Los Angeles from 1957 to 1997 rated Steele second (behind Gary Owens) among the 232 personalities nominated. The ballot was printed by Don Barrett in his 1994 book, and results are published in the second volume of his book. Rick Dees said of Steele in Barrett's book, "Pure, raw energy and focus. And he still has it every day. That's amazing!"

Boyd R. Britton, who worked with Steele in the late 1970s at KTNQ said, "He educated me in star quality, in energy and focus. He epitomized energy on the air." Reflecting on Steele's habit of using very high headphone levels, Britton said, "Very early on he was extremely hearing damaged. It was very difficult for him to hear in a group. That made his natural speaking voice almost as loud as his on-air voice."

In 1993, from KRTH, Steele told the Los Angeles Times: "I don't think I'm any different now. I've never stopped. I've never changed. I never did anything else. This is the music of my life."

He received a star on the Hollywood Walk of Fame on May 3, 1995. The star is located at 7080 Hollywood Boulevard near La Brea Avenue.

== Filmography ==
For a decade, Steele hosted a weekly dance-party show on KHJ-TV. First billed as Boss City in 1965, the Saturday 6 p.m. program became The Real Don Steele Show from 1970 to 1975. He appeared in several films, many times playing a disc jockey, in films such as Death Race 2000 (1975), Grand Theft Auto (1977), Rock 'n' Roll High School (1979), Eating Raoul (1982), and Gremlins (1984). He also appeared as himself in KISS Meets the Phantom of the Park (1978). On prime-time TV, Steele had appearances in a 1966 episode of Bewitched, and in an episode of Here Come the Brides in 1970.

The Real Don Steele sound clips from KHJ airchecks are prominently featured in Quentin Tarantino's Once Upon a Time in Hollywood (2019) and on its accompanying soundtrack album.

=== Film ===
| Title | Year | Role | Notes |
|---|---|---|---|
| Targets | 1968 | Deejay on Radio | Voice, Uncredited |
| The Student Teachers | 1973 | | |
| Death Race 2000 | 1975 | Junior Bruce | |
| Grand Theft Auto | 1977 | Curly Q. Brown | |
| Rock 'n' Roll High School | 1979 | Screamin' Steve Stevens | |
| Eating Raoul | 1982 | Howard Swine - Swingers Party Host | |
| Gremlins | 1984 | Rockin' Ricky Rialto | Voice |
| Nowhere to Run | 1989 | Charlie Caddo | |
| Once Upon a Time in Hollywood | 2019 | Himself | Voice, Uncredited |

== External sources ==
- The Real Don Steele collection of audio airchecks
- Don Steele at IMDb
