= KFOO (AM) =

- Riverside, California; United States
- Broadcast area: Riverside-San Bernardino, California
- Frequency: 1440 kHz
- Branding: Riverside's BIN 1440

Programming
- Format: Black-oriented news
- Affiliations: Black Information Network

Ownership
- Owner: iHeartMedia; (iHM Licenses, LLC)
- Sister stations: KGGI, KMYT, KPWK, KTMQ

History
- First air date: November 15, 1941; 84 years ago (as KPRO)
- Former call signs: KPRO (1941–1986); KDIF (1986–2010); KFNY (2010–2017)
- Call sign meaning: Foo Fighters (warehoused from KZTM)

Technical information
- Licensing authority: FCC
- Facility ID: 27390
- Class: B
- Power: 1,000 watts unlimited
- Transmitter coordinates: 34°1′36.1″N 117°21′30.2″W

Links
- Public license information: Public file; LMS
- Webcast: Listen live (via iHeartRadio)
- Website: riverside.binnews.com

KFOO (1440 AM) is a commercial radio station that is licensed to Riverside, California, and broadcasts to the Riverside—San Bernardino, California, area. The station is owned by iHeartMedia and airs an all-news radio format as an affiliate of Black Information Network. The KFOO studios are located in Riverside and the transmitter tower is in Colton along the Santa Ana River.

== History ==
=== Early years ===
The station first signed on November 15, 1941, owned by Broadcasting Corporation of America under the call sign KPRO. Operating at 1440 kHz, it was headquartered at 3401 Russell Street in Riverside.

In 1944, the station received Blue Network programming. In 1945, KPRO's programs included Philco Hall of Fame, America's Town Meeting, Counterspy, Gangbusters, This Is Your F.B.I., Walter Winchell, Drew Pearson, Tom Breneman, The Breakfast Club, Glamour Manor, Ladies Be Seated, John B. Kennedy, Baukhage Talking, Ethel and Albert, Guy Lombardo, The Metropolitan Opera, Cavalcade of Sports and The Ford Sunday Evening Hour.

KPRO was founded by Willard E. (Bill) Gleeson. In 1950, Gleeson, the company president, was sued by the Jefferson Standard Life Insurance Company of North Carolina, which claimed that payments on loans totaling $40,000 had not been made. The company said the firm, which also owned KREO in Indio, California, was "heavily in debt" for unpaid taxes and other liabilities. Gleeson sold all the stations he owned, except for KICO in Calexico, California. Albie Pearson, the 1958 American League Rookie of the Year, was a KPRO disc jockey in the winter of 1961–62.

In December 1964, KPRO was purchased by radio and television personality Dick Clark. The station was held under the name Progress Broadcasting, a wholly owned subsidiary of Dick Clark Productions. Clark bought KPRO from Foster Broadcasting for $435,000. Foster's principals were Tom S. Foster, Tolbert Foster, W.E. Dyche Jr., Edgar Younger and John Blake. Dave Taylor was to continue as general manager. Clark also bought the land and buildings (built in 1941) for an additional $150,000; the deals were completed on June 1, 1965. In March 1978, Progress sold KPRO to Inland Empire Broadcasters, majority-owned by station vice president Howard N. Fisher, for $780,000.

The station was acquired by Shayle Ray and Milton Klein for about $2 million in March 1983. In the early 1980s, KPRO aired a news/talk format with some sports programming. Before that it had a pop music format. Steve Julian and Larry Mantle co-hosted a show on this station during this period.

=== Bankruptcy ===
The 1,000-watt station in Riverside was losing some $40,000 a month in 1984, and by February 29 the 15-person staff had not been paid in two weeks. Milton Klein and Shayle Ray were trying to negotiate a sale of KPRO and its sisters, KPRD and KZNS of Barstow, California. KZNS and KPRD left the airwaves in early March after more than 30 years of broadcasting, but KPRO was saved at the last minute by an unidentified San Bernardino businessman who bought into the partnership with enough cash to pay the employees and stay on the air. KPRO's Arbitron ratings were about one percent of all listeners in its market.

In May 1984, KPRO filed for Chapter 11 bankruptcy. Regular programming at the station went off the air on May 15, 1984; it listed $2.5 million of debt. KPRO continued to broadcast California Angels baseball and Los Angeles Lakers basketball games to fulfill contractual obligations, and it went back on the air with other programing in mid-June, then in February again went on a sports-only schedule, with Pat Hasland hosting a call-in show, "Pro SportsTalk". Because the station's programming dropped to under 12 hours daily, the Federal Communications Commission (FCC) considered KPRO to have gone silent.

In June 1986, Klein/Ray Broadcasting sold KPRO to Lincoln Dellar-owned Inland Wireless Co. for $710,000. The new owner changed its call sign to KDIF on September 23; the KPRO call sign was then picked up by a station at 1570 AM. KDIF changed hands only three years later on October 24, 1989, when Hispanic Radio Broadcasters, headed by Gilberto Esquivel, bought the station.

=== Jacor/Clear Channel/iHeartMedia era (1998–present) ===
KDIF, which was airing a regional Mexican format, was purchased by Jacor Communications in May 1998 for $2.65 million. The station immediately added Los Angeles Dodgers game broadcasts in English, though it otherwise retained its Spanish-language programming. Jacor merged with Clear Channel Communications later that year.

On September 27, 2010, KDIF flipped from Spanish oldies to an all-comedy format branded "24/7 Comedy" and began using new call letters KFNY (meaning "funny"). On August 4, 2014, following the demise of the 24/7 Comedy radio network, the station flipped to news/talk as "NewsTalk AM 1440". Clear Channel changed its name to iHeartMedia a month later.

On May 15, 2017, KFNY exchanged formats with KKDD in San Bernardino, flipping to Spanish adult hits and sending the news/talk format to 1290 AM. KFNY was rebranded as "La Preciosa 1440". On November 14, the station swapped call signs with KFOO in Tacoma, Washington, as part of an impending sale of the latter station.

On June 29, 2020, 15 iHeartMedia stations in markets with large African American populations, including KFOO, began stunting with speeches by prominent African Americans, interspersed with messages such as "our voices will be heard" and "our side of the story is about to be told", with a new format slated to launch the following day. On June 30 at 9:00 a.m., KFOO began broadcasting as a charter affiliate of Black Information Network (BIN), an all-news radio format targeted to the African American community.
