= KNX (disambiguation) =

KNX is a home and building automation standard.

KNX may also refer to:

- KNX, the New York Stock Exchange ticker symbol for Knight-Swift, a US trucking company
- KNX (AM), a radio station (1070 AM) licensed to Los Angeles, California, United States
- KNX-FM, a radio station (97.1 MHz) licensed to Los Angeles, California, United States
- KCBS-FM, a radio station (93.1 FM) licensed to Los Angeles, California, United States, which used the call sign KNX-FM from May 1986 to March 1989
- The IATA airport code for East Kimberley Regional Airport
