= KPWK =

KPWK may refer to:

- KPWK (AM), a radio station (1350 AM) licensed to serve San Bernardino, California, United States
- KJR-FM, a radio station (93.3 FM) licensed to serve Seattle, Washington, United States, which held the call letters KPWK from 2016 to 2018
- Chicago Executive Airport, formerly known as Palwaukee, the GA airport serving Chicago, Illinois assigned the ICAO code KPWK
