= KFNY =

KFNY may refer to:

- KZTM, a radio station (102.9 FM) licensed to serve McKenna, Washington, United States, which held the call sign KFNY from 2017 to 2019
- KFOO (AM), a radio station (1440 AM) licensed to serve Riverside, California, United States, which held the call sign KFNY from 2010 to 2017
