= KMYT =

KMYT may refer to:

- KMYT (FM), a radio station (94.5 FM) licensed to Temecula, California, United States
- KMYT-TV, a television station (channel 41) licensed to Tulsa, Oklahoma, United States
