= El Portal =

El Portal may refer to:

- El Portal, California
- El Portal, Florida
- El Portal Theatre, a historic theater in the NoHo Arts District, Los Angeles
- KXXZ, branded as El Portal, a radio station in Barstow, California
