= Steve Julian =

Steve Julian (July 4, 1958 – April 24, 2016) was an American radio broadcaster who was the Morning Edition host for Southern California National Public Radio affiliate 89.3 KPCC in Pasadena, California.

Julian was born in Pomona, California, and started his broadcasting career as a police dispatcher and served as a police officer in Baldwin Park, California. He also studied massage and maintained a small clientele. He joined KPCC in 2000 after five years as a traffic reporter for AirWatch America in Santa Ana, California.

He briefly hosted an afternoon drive-time show for KPRO in Riverside, California, with his friend, Larry Mantle.

Julian was also actively involved in local theater productions, both as an actor and a playwright, and was a member of DramaWest, a Los Angeles theater group.

In November 2015, Julian was diagnosed with terminal brain cancer. As a result of the tumor, he suffered short-term memory loss, and speech became difficult, leading to his resignation from his morning host duties. Julian succumbed to the effects of the cancer on the morning of April 24, 2016.

== Awards ==
- Five L.A. Press Club Awards
- Three Edward R. Murrow Awards
- Three Golden Mike Awards
