= Pat Martin (broadcaster) =

American broadcaster

Pat Martin is a retired professional broadcaster formerly on KRXQ. As of July 6, 2021, he did the morning show on sister station KSEG The Eagle, the classic rock station in Sacramento, California.

== Early life ==
Martin grew up in Southern California. He attended Lynwood High School after which he attended Magnolia High School in Anaheim. He then attended Cypress College before transferring to San Diego State University, where he began working at campus radio station KCR-FM. Martin's first experience in the entertainment industry was in 1968 on the Art Linkletter Show, on the segment known as "Kids Say The Darndest Things".

== Career ==
Upon graduating from college, Martin was hired by KGB-FM in San Diego, where he worked from 1978 to 1988 with a one-year break in between to work at KMET-FM in Los Angeles in 1986–1987. In 1988, Martin accepted a job at KRXQ-FM. He has run the midday shift (10 am to 3 pm) since August 8, 1988 and has the longest running consecutive show in Sacramento radio history. In 2010, radio historian and author Alex Cosper wrote about Martin in his article "Sacramento Radio History" from the web site "playlistresearch.com":

Not many radio personalities last a long time at one station. Sacramento's rock stations KRXQ and KSEG have been the best at hanging on to air talent. Under Station Manager Jim Fox, Pat Martin programs the music, decides on new music and has been doing the same airshift at the same station longer than anyone else in Sacramento. He has been doing middays at KRXQ since August 1988.

In 2010, Pat Martin revealed that he loved his job, stating that "the listeners consider [him] a friend". In a 2013 interview with music website All Access, Martin stated, “In Sacramento, I am generally known as the guy who put Tesla back together. It happened in 2000. The guys had been fighting for years and I somehow convinced them to resurrect their career with a comeback show at The Arco Arena.”

On August 8, 2018, Martin celebrated his 30th anniversary on KRXQ (98 Rock), with guest appearances on his show from Ben Fong-Torres of Rolling Stone magazine fame, Sacramento Mayor Darrell Steinberg, and Frank Hannon from the Sacramento band Tesla.

On September 29, 2023, Pat Martin wrapped up his radio broadcasting career. His final broadcast on KSEG 96.9 FM (The Eagle), put an end to a remarkable 46 year career, 35 of them on Sacramento airwaves. After four decades of wearing headphones for several hours a day, in addition to attending well over 1000 concerts, Pat developed tinnitus (ringing in the ears), which he cited as the reason he chose to retire.
