= KPWK (AM) =

Coordinates: 34°05′37″N 117°18′0.2″W

- San Bernardino, California; United States
- Broadcast area: Riverside-San Bernardino, California
- Frequency: 1350 kHz
- Branding: Fox Sports Radio 1350

Programming
- Format: Sports
- Affiliations: Fox Sports Radio

Ownership
- Owner: iHeartMedia, Inc.; (iHM Licenses, LLC)
- Sister stations: KFOO, KGGI, KMYT, KTMQ

History
- First air date: 1947
- Former call signs: KCKC (1947–2001); KEWS (2001–2002); KTDD (2002–2017); KUBE (2017–2018)
- Call sign meaning: PoWer (warehoused from a station in Seattle)

Technical information
- Licensing authority: FCC
- Facility ID: 2399
- Class: B
- Power: 5,000 watts day 600 watts night

Links
- Public license information: Public file; LMS
- Webcast: Listen Live
- Website: foxsportsradio1350.iheart.com

KPWK (1350 AM) is a commercial radio station in San Bernardino, California, broadcasting to the Riverside-San Bernardino, California, area on 1350 AM. Its studios are in Riverside and the transmitter tower is in San Bernardino.

KPWK airs a sports format branded as "Fox Sports I.E. 1350 AM."

== History ==
The station was known for years as KCKC and was the number-one country station in the Riverside/San Bernardino market until country station KFRG-FM came on the air in the late 1980s. In 1993, it switched to a news talk format which lasted until 1996. From 1997-1998, the station returned to a country music format, this time concentrating on classic country. The station took on the nickname "The Big Dog" during this period. Later, the station was sold to Clear Channel Communications. After brief periods as a sports-talk station and a Spanish-language station, the company changed the format to news and talk and the call letters to KEWS. In 2002, it was changed back to a classic country station and the call letters were changed to KTDD, meaning "the Toad". The name was taken from the 2000 film O Brother, Where Art Thou? in which the character Pete was thought to have been turned into a toad by blue grass singing sirens; more specifically from the line in the movie house, "We thought you was a toad!" The name was initially not intended as a take on contemporary country station "K-Frog".

Former KCKC DJs Bill Georgi and J.W. Bradbury were hired as two of the Toad's DJs, along with other DJs, some of whom were previously heard on other country radio stations. As of 2006, Bill Georgi, who is also the station's program director, is the only local DJ still heard on the station. He hosts the station's morning show Monday through Friday. The rest of the day features an automated national format 'Country Gold' provided by Jones Radio Network. The station also carries most NASCAR races in addition to a live call in NASCAR pre-show Race Radio hosted in studio by Greg Coz, and some public affairs programming on the weekends.

J.W. Bradbury died of an apparent heart attack on October 27, 2006. For a few minutes while his funeral service was being held in Highland, California, KTDD interrupted regular programming and did an on the air tribute to him. Attendees of the funeral heard the tribute over a radio that was hooked into the church's PA system.

On June 1, 2013, KTDD changed from classic country to FOX Sports from Premier Networks.

On August 4, 2015, it was announced that KPWK would be the exclusive broadcaster of IE Sports Net.

On November 14, 2017, the station swapped callsigns with KUBE of Tacoma, Washington as part of an impending sale of the latter station.

On May 11, 2018, KUBE swapped call signs with commonly-owned Seattle, Washington station KPWK as part of a warehousing move.

== Sports play-by-play rights ==
- Current:
  - San Diego State football
  - Rancho Cucamonga Quakes
  - Los Angeles Dodgers
