= KMYT (FM) =

Radio station in Temecula, California

Coordinates: 33.4809°N 117.1836°W

- Temecula, California; United States
- Broadcast area: Temecula Valley; Inland Empire
- Frequency: 94.5 MHz
- Branding: Radio 94.5

Programming
- Format: Alternative rock
- Affiliations: Compass Media Networks

Ownership
- Owner: iHeartMedia, Inc.; (iHM Licenses, LLC)
- Sister stations: KFOO; KGGI; KPWK; KTMQ

History
- First air date: 1999; 27 years ago (as KTMK)
- Former call signs: KTMK (1999–2001); KOGO-FM (2001–2002)
- Call sign meaning: "My Telecula" (once simulcast KMYI in San Diego)

Technical information
- Licensing authority: FCC
- Facility ID: 2910
- Class: A
- ERP: 540 watts
- HAAT: 235 meters (771 ft)

Links
- Public license information: Public file; LMS
- Webcast: Listen live (via iHeartRadio)
- Website: radio945fm.iheart.com

KMYT (94.5 MHz) is an alternative rock FM radio station in Temecula, California. The station is owned and operated by iHeartMedia, Inc. KMYT shares studios and offices with co-owned KTMQ, as well as the iHeart Riverside-San Bernardino stations, on Iowa Avenue in Riverside.

The transmitter is off Via Barranca in a rural part of Temecula.

== History ==
This station signed on in 1999 as KTMK, owned by Clear Channel Communications, based in San Antonio. KTMK began simulcasting San Diego sister station KOGO shortly after it went on the air. Clear Channel wanted a more reliable signal for KOGO in southern Riverside County, which has become a significant suburb of San Diego (and also of Los Angeles, for that matter). The call sign became KOGO-FM in 2001.

One year later, Clear Channel changed the simulcast from KOGO to that of co-owned San Diego hot adult contemporary station KMYI. The Temecula station became KMYT. The format lasted for two years until the simulcast was broken and the station flipped to smooth jazz, which would last 10 years. At this point, it became a local station for the Temecula area, alongside co-owned KTMQ.

While smooth jazz was a popular format in Southern California, achieving high ratings for KTWV in Los Angeles and KIFM in San Diego, the format began to fade by the early 2000s. KMYT hung on with the format a while longer, but flipped to an adult album alternative (AAA) format, branded as "Radio 94.5", on August 29, 2014. Clear Channel was renamed iHeartMedia the following month. Following KLVJ's switch to contemporary Christian music in September 2015, KMYT became the only commercially operating AAA station in Southern California, if not the entire state.

In February 2019, the station unveiled a new logo, still keeping the "Radio" brand, to be followed nearly one year later by a shift to a CHR-leaning alternative format, leaving non-commercial KCSN as the only AAA-formatted station in Southern California. The format shift occurred on January 29, 2020, at midnight, with the first song being "Thunder" by Imagine Dragons.

== Sports programming ==
As of 2019, KMYT is now the radio home of the Lake Elsinore Storm minor league baseball games, which were previously carried on Entercom's country station KXFG. Storm games are the only brokered programming carried by KMYT.
