= KNX-FM =

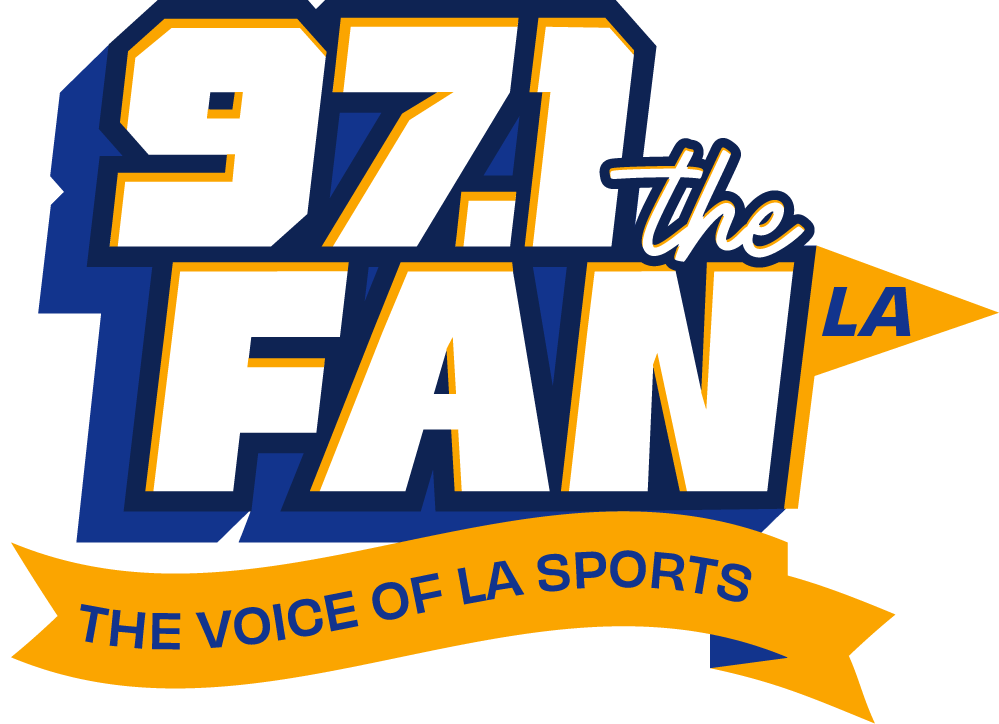
- Los Angeles, California; United States
- Broadcast area: Greater Los Angeles
- Frequency: 97.1 MHz (HD Radio)
- Branding: 97.1 The Fan LA

Programming
- Format: Sports radio
- Subchannels: HD2: KNX simulcast (All-news radio); HD3: Fire Lane (Non-Stop Dance Mix)
- Affiliations: Westwood One Sports

Ownership
- Owner: Audacy, Inc.; (Audacy License, LLC)
- Sister stations: KCBS-FM; KFRG; KNX; KROQ-FM; KRTH; KTWV; KXFG

History
- First air date: 1954
- Former call signs: KFMU (1954–1966); KGBS-FM (1966–1976); KGBS (1976–1978); KHTZ (1978–1985); KBZT (1985–1986); KLSX (1986–2009); KAMP (2009); KAMP-FM (2009–2021); KNOU (2021)
- Call sign meaning: Inherited from KNX (artifact of previous format now on its HD2 subchannel)

Technical information
- Licensing authority: FCC
- Facility ID: 25075
- Class: B
- ERP: 21,000 watts
- HAAT: 915 meters (3,002 ft)
- Transmitter coordinates: 34.227°N 118.067°W
- Repeater: 93.1 KCBS-FM-HD2 (Los Angeles)

Links
- Public license information: Public file; LMS
- Webcast: Listen live (via Audacy); Listen live (via Audacy) (HD2); Listen live (via Audacy) (HD3)
- Website: www.audacy.com/thefanla; www.audacy.com/knxnews (HD2); www.audacy.com/fire-lane (HD3)

KNX-FM (97.1 MHz, "97.1 The Fan LA") is a commercial sports radio station in Los Angeles, California, owned by Audacy, Inc. The station's studios are located at the intersection of Wilshire and Hauser Boulevards in the Miracle Mile district of Los Angeles, and its transmitter is atop Mount Wilson.

In addition to a standard analog transmission, KNX-FM broadcasts in the HD Radio format and streams online via Audacy. KNX-FM's HD2 subchannel carries a simulcast of KNX-AM that was formerly used on the HD1 channel and KNX-HD3 features a non-stop dance mix-show format billed as "Fire Lane".

== History ==
=== Early years ===
In 1954, the station signed on as KFMU and operated under that call sign during the 1950s and early 1960s. It was originally licensed to the Los Angeles suburb of Glendale and was owned by Nicolas M. Brazy. KFMU aired an easy listening format known as "Good Music". The station was a subsidiary of Metropolitan Theatres Corp., which by 1959 was program testing KFMW in San Bernardino, and held a permit for a KFMX in San Diego as well as two other stations. (KFMX-FM is now a mainstream rock station in Lubbock, Texas.)

In the late 1960s, KFMU was purchased by Storer Broadcasting and became home to KGBS-FM, as a sister station to KGBS (1020 AM). The two stations carried a country music format. Since its AM station was a daytimer, only authorized to be on the air during daylight hours, the FM station allowed the format to be heard around the clock, for those who had FM radios. In the early 1970s, the station experimented with rock and roll and pop music formats before switching to a soft country format in 1973, when it adopted the name "Gentle Country". During the July 8, 1972, edition of American Top 40, Casey Kasem listed KGBS as the show's affiliate in Los Angeles. In 1976, KGBS-FM continued with its country music format while its AM sister station switched to top 40. On August 28, 1978, the FM station changed its callsign to KHTZ while continuing with its country music format.

On July 31, 1979, Storer, after having sold the AM radio station which was now known as KTNQ (Ten-Q), moved its top-40 format to 97.1 FM and began broadcasting as KHTZ ("K-Hits"). For a few hours, the two stations simulcast the signal until KTNQ switched to Spanish-language programming at noon. Within a few weeks, KHTZ evolved into an adult contemporary outlet. On November 27, 1985, the station changed its callsign to KBZT and was known as "K-Best 97". (The KBZT calls are now assigned to an alternative rock station downstate in San Diego.)

=== Classic rock era (1986–1995) ===
On September 26, 1986, at 3 pm, the station was renamed KLSX and flipped to a classic rock format. The call letters KLSX were chosen to sound like the word "classics".

To demonstrate the vastness of the station's on-air library, KLSX advertised "no-repeat workdays", not playing any song more than once per day. An exception was when the station played one song twice as part of a contest; listeners could win a prize for being the designated caller and identify correctly the intentionally repeated track. Additionally, KLSX hosted an annual "A—Z" event where the entire library was played in alphabetical order by artist during weekday hours, a playlist that ran about 100 hours. Whenever the station played "Southern Man" by Neil Young and Crazy Horse, it was always followed by Lynyrd Skynyrd's "Sweet Home Alabama".

In 1988, the long-running Beatles show Breakfast with the Beatles with host Deirdre O'Donoghue moved to KLSX from KNX-FM, a show which she began doing on KMET in 1983. After she died in 2001, the show was taken over by Chris Carter. On September 3, 2006, the station broadcast its last airing of Breakfast with the Beatles, which was then replaced by infomercials, drawing some local protest. Paul McCartney, Ringo Starr, and Yoko Ono have all called into the program. In late November 2006, local classic rock station KLOS picked up the show.

On July 21, 1991, the station began to air the syndicated Howard Stern Show and took on the slogan "Howard Stern all morning, classic rock all day".

=== Hot talk era (1995–2009) ===
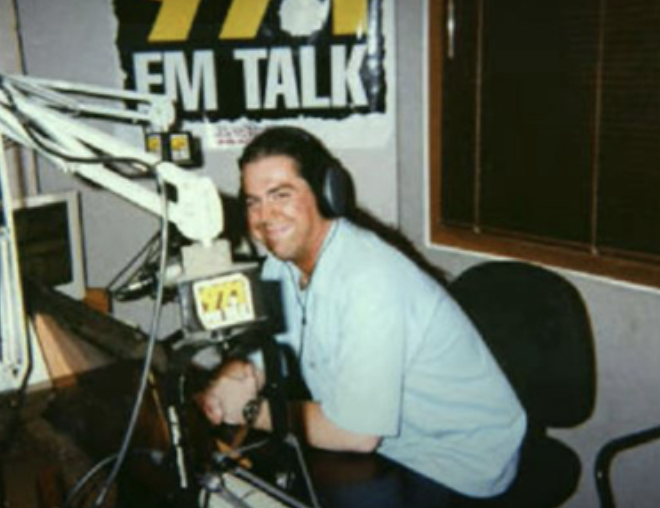
Jeff Duran On KLSX 97.1 FM

On July 31, 1995, KLSX changed to a hot talk format on weekdays and went by the moniker "Real Radio 97.1", and had hosts such as Susan Olsen and Ken Ober, Scott Ferrall, Riki Rachtman, Kato Kaelin, Mother Love, Carlos Oscar, Voxx, Tim Conway Jr., Doug Steckler and the Regular Guys (Larry Wachs and Eric von Haessler). Howard Stern was critical of this format change and referred to it as "Hindenburg Radio". In 1996, the station dropped the "Real Radio" name and became known as "The FM Talk Station", hiring new hosts; the following year, the station began carrying the syndicated Tom Leykis Show, becoming its flagship station. On April 1, 2002, KLSX temporarily brought back Kaelin and the "Real Radio" slogans and jingles as part of an April Fools' Day joke.

KLSX was owned by Greater Media until 1997, when Greater Media swapped KLSX and sister station KRLA for three stations: WMMR in Philadelphia and WBOS and WOAZ in Boston. The deal enabled Greater Media to operate larger clusters in these two markets while exiting Los Angeles. The swap led KLSX into the ownership of CBS Radio, where it joined FM radio stations KTWV and KCBS-FM along with AM radio stations KNX and KFWB.

From 1995 until its acquisition by CBS in 1997, KLSX played alternative music on weekends. Instead of competing with its now-sister station, established modern rock outlet KROQ-FM, it was asked to switch to adult album alternative, a blend of album rock and alternative music that appealed to a 35-and-up age demographic. That format continued on weekends until 1999, when the talk format was expanded to weekends, leaving Saturday night's Jeff Duran Metal Blitz and Sunday morning's Breakfast with the Beatles as the only programs that played music. During that era and prior to being sold, KLSX boasted the only late-night talk shows in Los Angeles featuring women as hosts: Dr. X and subsequently a short-run of Shrink Rap. KLSX was also the local home of the syndicated novelty music program Dr. Demento.

KLSX was the Los Angeles-area radio home of the Oakland Raiders of the National Football League. Previously, the station aired games from the Sports USA Radio Network and NFL on Westwood One Sports. In 2001, it carried the Los Angeles Xtreme of the XFL. KLSX has also aired a sports year-in-review show from Westwood One.

A number of changes came to KLSX in 2005. On October 25, it was announced that Adam Carolla would take over as the station's morning show host in January 2006 due to Howard Stern's departure to satellite radio. On that same day, the station also became known on-air as "97.1 Free FM"—so-called to highlight that its stations broadcast free-to-air, funded by commercials, whereas satellite radio requires a subscription fee. In addition to KLSX, CBS Radio introduced its Free FM branding on KSCF in San Diego, KIFR in San Francisco, and other hot talk-formatted outlets. Those three California stations carried The Tom Leykis Show and The John and Jeff Show. Locally, Tim Conway Jr. and comedy writer Doug Steckler co-hosted the evening show (The Conway and Steckler Show) until June 2005, when Steckler's contract was not renewed. Funnyman/impressionist Brian Whitman was brought in as Steckler's replacement, and the show was renamed The Conway and Whitman Show. The Frosty, Heidi and Frank Show was picked up and, until January 2007, was syndicated to KSCF.

In 2007, KLSX added Danny Bonaduce to The Adam Carolla Show (replacing sportscaster Dave Dameshek). In 2008, he was given his own (local) one-hour show following Frosty, Heidi and Frank, in a timeslot that had been vacant since the departure of entertainment reporter Sam Rubin in 2003. Also in 2008, Brian Whitman unexpectedly left the station in March. Tim Conway, Jr. ended up hosting the evening show alone. Arsenio Hall was a semi-regular guest host with Tim on The Tim Conway Jr. Show on Wednesday nights in 2008–09.

=== Top 40/CHR era (2009–2021) ===
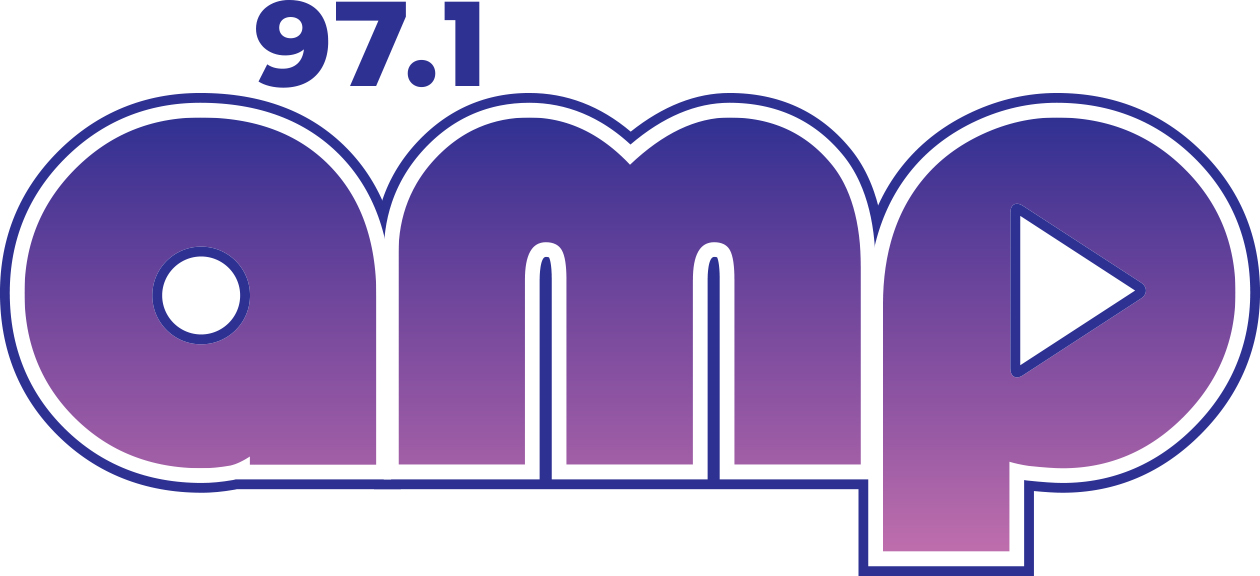
"97.1 AMP" logo used from March to September 2020

In early 2009, speculation arose on whether KLSX would be switching formats. On February 17, information started to emerge that KLSX was to drop hot talk on February 20 and flip to a top 40 format aimed at younger listeners, taking the "AMP" format that was created by KROQ-FM program director Kevin Weatherly and APD John Michael on the HD2 channel of KCBS-FM.

The station's main line up of The Adam Carolla Show, Frosty, Heidi and Frank, Danny Bonaduce (in a solo spot known as Broadcasting Bonaduce), The Tom Leykis Show, The Tim Conway Jr. Show, and The John and Jeff Show were all given advance notice of the format shift and afforded the opportunity to host final shows to explain the situation and say their goodbyes. "97.1 FM Talk" ended on February 20, 2009 at 5 p.m. (Pacific time), giving longtime radio veteran Tom Leykis the final sign-off and the opportunity to "blow up" the station (in reference to a catchphrase used by the show's callers, "Blow me up, Tom!").

The new format, branded "97.1 AMP Radio", then launched with "Paranoid" by Kanye West featuring Mr Hudson (which coincidentally was also playing on its new rival KIIS-FM at the same time), beginning a commercial-free block of 10,000 songs, similar to the debuts of the current KDAY in 2004 and, in 1989, KQLZ (Pirate Radio). The launch of "AMP" marked the first top 40 radio battle in Los Angeles since KPWR switched to a hip hop-heavy rhythmic contemporary format in 1994. On June 30, 2009, the station changed its callsign to KAMP to match the new format branding, the call letters having become available when student-run LPFM station KAMP-LP in St. Michael, Alaska went silent on April 20 of that year. On July 7, the "-FM" suffix was added, making the calls KAMP-FM, to avoid confusion with KAMP (AM), an unlicensed student-run radio station at the University of Arizona, which had for several years been exploring the possibility of starting a LPFM as well which would presumably have revived the KAMP-LP call letters.

On January 4, 2010, KAMP-FM rounded out their on-air lineup, which featured Carson Daly in mornings, Chris Booker middays, Ted Stryker afternoons, and Casey McCabe at night. CBS Radio would later expand the "AMP Radio" brand to Detroit, Boston, Orlando, New York City, Philadelphia, and Dallas. As of 2021, all of these stations had dropped the "AMP Radio" brand and flipped to different formats.

On February 2, 2017, CBS Radio announced it would merge with Entercom. The merger was approved on November 9, 2017, and was consummated on November 17.

Many personnel changes have occurred in the years following the merger. Carson Daly left KAMP-FM on July 28, 2017. The morning drive timeslot remained open until February 2018, when the station introduced a new morning show hosted by former WBMP New York morning host Edgar "Shoboy" Sotelo, former WWWQ Atlanta morning show co-host and comedian Brian Moote, and Billboard news correspondent Chelsea Briggs. Moote left KAMP-FM in July 2019, while Sotelo left in October 2019. The departures would result in the on-air lineup being revised, making Booker move from afternoons to mornings, and adding former KPWR morning co-host Krystal Bianca to mornings, Christen Limon to middays, and Yesi Ortiz to afternoons, while McCabe remains as night host. Booker was cut by Entercom due to layoffs from the COVID-19 pandemic on April 3, 2020. On August 3, 2020, The Morning Mess from Phoenix sister station KALV-FM, hosted by Joey Boy, Aneesh Ratan, Jeana Shepherd, and Karla Hernandez, began broadcasting on KAMP-FM. In addition, the station would again overhaul its on-air lineup, this time adding Julia Lepidi (from Chicago sister station WBBM-FM) and former Detroit host Josh "Bru" Brubaker; the two would later serve as national hosts for the company's CHR stations in April 2021, replacing local talent in various dayparts..

On March 30, 2020, KAMP-FM dropped "Radio" from their moniker and re-branded as "97.1 AMP". At some point the following September, it reverted to the original "97.1 AMP Radio" branding.

Following Entercom's rebranding as Audacy earlier that month, on April 15, 2021 KAMP-FM rebranded as "97.1 Now", and the slogan changed to "LA's Party Station". The station concurrently applied to change its call letters to KNOU (which were previously used on a sister station in St. Louis which had similar branding from 2015 to 2020), which took effect on April 22. At the time of the rebrand, KAMP-FM was the last remaining "AMP Radio" branded station launched by CBS.

=== KNX simulcast (2021–2026) ===
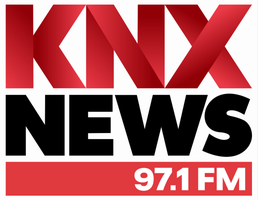
KNX logo used from 2021-2023

On December 6, 2021, Audacy announced that KNOU would flip to a simulcast of KNX. The change took place at 3 p.m. that day, dropping the "Now" format about 30 seconds into playing "Sunflower" by Post Malone and Swae Lee. With this move, KIIS-FM remained as the only top 40-formatted station in the Los Angeles market.

On December 21, 2021, KNOU changed its call letters to KNX-FM, further reflecting the AM station's primary signal shift to the FM band, while still being heard on the existing 1070 AM frequency. This marked the return to the Los Angeles airwaves for the KNX-FM call sign, last used on March 2, 1989. KNX-FM originally signed on the air on March 30, 1948, on 93.1 MHz, the frequency of current-day KCBS-FM.

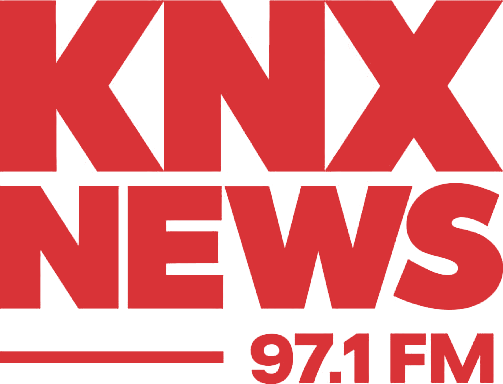
KNX logo used from 2023-2026

On December 9, 2025, KNX began simulcasting with sister all news station KCBS (AM) between midnight and 5 am. News, traffic and weather reports are combined to cover both Los Angeles and the San Francisco Bay Area and originate from KCBS in San Francisco.

=== The Fan sports talk (2026–) ===
On April 28, 2026, Audacy announced that the station would adopt a sports talk format known as "97.1 The Fan." The KNX news format will continue to be heard on 1070 AM with the FM simulcast moving to 97.1's HD2 subchannel. The station launched the new format at 6:00 a.m. Pacific time on May 18, 2026, one week later than originally reported.

Audacy officials cited the growth of local sports and the revenue challenges of the Audacy station cluster. John Federman, regional president: "Local sports is one of the areas that has growth, and we know that from a revenue standpoint, for radio on our other stations, it's challenging, and that's why you see us pushing to other platforms. And KNX, it's vital. It is a vital necessity in the L.A. market, and by the way, it was vital for the entire country when those fires were going on. None of that's changing."

The daily lineup on 97.1 The Fan is as thus:

- Derek Fisher and Cody Decker - 6-10 a.m.
- Brock Vereen and Alex Curry - 10 a.m.-2 p.m.
- Doug McKain and Bill Reiter - 2-6 p.m.
- James Koh - 6-10 p.m.
- Overnights and weekends consist of Westwood One Sports network programming.

Unlike its Audacy sister stations, KNX-FM does not have live play-by-play rights to any local sports teams. However, it broadcasts many games as part of the Westwood One network, including NFL games on Thursday, Sunday, and Monday nights, the NFL International Series, college football, NFL postseason games (as of January 2027), and NCAA March Madness (as of March 2027). Sister station KCBS-FM has partial rights to the Los Angeles Rams, along with KSPN.

== HD Radio ==
KNX-FM broadcasts in HD Radio with three digital subchannels:

- KNX-HD1 is a digital simulcast of the FM analog signal.
- KNX-HD2 carries a simulcast of KNX-AM
- KNX-HD3 airs a non-stop dance mixshow format billed as "Fire Lane".

=== HD2 history ===
On January 8, 2018, Entercom entered a deal to bring the New York City-based dance/EDM webcast Pulse 87 to the Los Angeles airwaves as a HD2 subchannel of KNX-FM, billing it as "Pulse 97.1 HD2". The subchannel replaced the simulcast of KNX, which moved over to the HD2 subchannel of KCBS-FM.

On August 31, 2018, KNX-HD2 dropped Pulse 87 to make room for the newly launched "Out Now Radio", a talk/EDM format targeted to the LGBTQ community. Many of the hosts on Out Now Radio were based at Entercom's Los Angeles studios. On November 1, 2018, Out Now Radio rebranded as "Channel Q".

After the KNX simulcast was discontinued on the main signal in May 2026, it was moved to the HD2 subchannel and Channel Q was moved to KRTH’s HD2 subchannel.

== See also ==
- List of three-letter broadcast call signs in the United States
