= KGGI =

Coordinates: 34.234°N 117.141°W

- Riverside, California; United States
- Broadcast area: Inland Empire and Victor Valley
- Frequency: 99.1 MHz (HD Radio)
- RDS: PS: 99.1 KGGI - Title - Artist
- Branding: 99-1 KGGI

Programming
- Format: Rhythmic contemporary
- Subchannels: HD2: Bilingual adult contemporary

Ownership
- Owner: iHeartMedia, Inc.; (iHM Licenses, LLC)
- Sister stations: KFOO, KMYT, KPWK, KTMQ

History
- First air date: January 23, 1965
- Former call signs: KBBL (1965–1979)
- Call sign meaning: GGI, with the G in lowercase, look similar to 99.1

Technical information
- Licensing authority: FCC
- Facility ID: 10135
- Class: B
- ERP: 2,550 watts
- HAAT: 562 meters (1,844 ft)

Links
- Public license information: Public file; LMS
- Webcast: Listen live (via iHeartRadio)
- Website: 991kggi.iheart.com

KGGI (99.1 FM) is a commercial radio station licensed to Riverside, California, and broadcasting to the Inland Empire. The station airs a rhythmic contemporary format and is owned by iHeartMedia, Inc. Its studios are on Iowa Avenue in Riverside.

KGGI has an effective radiated power (ERP) of 2,550 watts. Its transmitter tower is on Ongo Camp Road in San Bernardino National Forest near Lake Arrowhead and Running Springs. KGGI broadcasts an HD Radio signal. In addition to its core service area of the Inland Empire, the station's high transmitter site allows it to be heard clearly in the Victor Valley, where it regularly rates #1 in their radio ratings. The HD2 digital subchannel formerly played classic hip hop music, but switched to Bilingual adult contemporary. The station also streams on the iHeartRadio app.

== History ==
=== Christian Radio and Contemporary Hits ===
The station signed on the air on January 23, 1965. It aired a Christian radio format as KBBL ("K-Bible"). The original chief engineer, who signed KGGI on the air, was Lee McGowan. Upon its sale from C. Edwin Goad to Lyncoln and Sylvia Dellar in 1979, KBBL became KGGI. The original airstaff for KGGI included program director Brian White, along with Bob West, Lisa Giles, Dan Harrison, Cliff Roberts, and Benny Martinez, while Jerry Clifton was the consultant. When the acquisition closed, KGGI flipped to Top 40 (CHR).

In 1998, the station was sold to Chase Radio Properties. It was sold again in 2000 to AMFM, Inc. AMFM was an affiliate of Clear Channel Outdoor, which in turn spun off its communications and radio divisions into Clear Channel Communications. In 2014, Clear Channel Communications was renamed iHeartMedia. Over time, the station moved from Mainstream Top 40 to a Rhythmic Contemporary format.
