= KXFG =

Radio station in Menifee, California

Simulcast of KFRG, San Bernardino
- Menifee, California; United States
- Broadcast area: Temecula, California, Fallbrook, California
- Frequency: 92.9 MHz (HD Radio)
- Branding: 92.9 K-FROG

Programming
- Language: English
- Format: Country music
- Affiliations: San Diego Padres

Ownership
- Owner: Audacy, Inc.; (Audacy License, LLC)
- Sister stations: KCBS-FM; KFRG; KNX; KNX-FM; KROQ-FM; KRTH; KTWV

History
- First air date: March 1997
- Call sign meaning: Variation of K-Frog branding

Technical information
- Licensing authority: FCC
- Facility ID: 63912
- Class: A
- ERP: 6,000 watts
- HAAT: 100 meters (330 ft)
- Transmitter coordinates: 33.593°N 117.148°W

Links
- Public license information: Public file; LMS
- Webcast: Listen live (via Audacy)
- Website: audacy.com/kfrog

KXFG (92.9 FM) is a commercial country music radio station in Menifee, California, broadcasting to the Temecula area. KXFG is a simulcast of KFRG in San Bernardino, California. Its studios are in Riverside and the transmitter site for KXFG is in Murrieta.

KXFG broadcasts and HD Radio signal.

On August 17, 2006, KFRG became the only country radio station that could be heard in the Los Angeles area by default, as KZLA changed its programming format to rhythmic adult contemporary, until October 28, 2006, when KKGO changed its programming format from adult standards to country to fill void in the Los Angeles area.

KFRG had been focusing more on Orange County and Los Angeles area news and traffic since the demise of KZLA, but on February 23, 2007, KKGO moved its Country format and call letters to its FM sister station, thus bringing a full-powered FM Country music station back the nation's second largest radio market after a six-month absence.

In October 2006, KFRG added the syndicated overnight program, After Midnite, from Premiere Radio Networks which is hosted by Blair Garner.

On February 2, 2017, CBS Radio announced it would merge with Entercom. The merger was approved on November 9, 2017, and was consummated on the 17th.

== Lake Elsinore Storm Baseball Games ==
During Lake Elsinore Storm baseball games, KXFG formerly interrupted the KFRG simulcast to carry the team's play-by-play. It replaced XEPE-AM in 2009. As of 2018, Lake Elsinore Storm Baseball games have moved to KMYT.
