= KTMQ =

Radio station in Temecula, California

Coordinates: 33.481°N 117.184°W

- Temecula, California; United States
- Broadcast area: Temecula Valley; Inland Empire
- Frequency: 103.3 MHz
- Branding: Q 103.3

Programming
- Format: Active rock

Ownership
- Owner: iHeartMedia, Inc.; (iHM Licenses, LLC)
- Sister stations: KFOO, KGGI, KMYT, KPWK

History
- First air date: 2000; 26 years ago (as KFXM)
- Former call signs: KFXM (2000–2001); KGBB (2001–2004)
- Call sign meaning: K TeMecula Valley's Q103.3

Technical information
- Licensing authority: FCC
- Facility ID: 85012
- Class: A
- ERP: 1,250 watts
- HAAT: 218 meters (715 ft)

Links
- Public license information: Public file; LMS
- Webcast: Listen Live
- Website: q1033.iheart.com

KTMQ (103.3 FM) is an active rock radio station that serves the Temecula Valley and Inland Empire areas. The station is owned by iHeartMedia, Inc.

== Station origin ==
KTMQ launched in 2000 to simulcast the signal of KGB, and was called KGBB at launch. The KGB signal is very weak in southern Riverside County, from where many San Diego-area workers now commute daily. In 2005, the signal broke off to become a local station. All automated, no local personalities.
