= KCBS-FM =

Adult hits radio station in Los Angeles

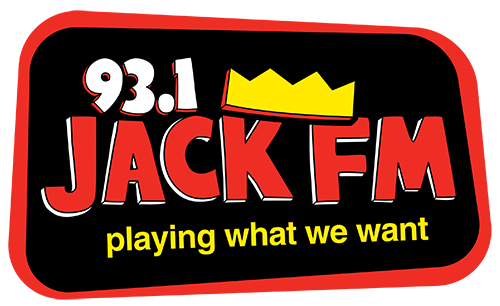
- Los Angeles, California; United States
- Broadcast area: Greater Los Angeles
- Frequency: 93.1 MHz (HD Radio)
- Branding: 93.1 Jack FM

Programming
- Language: English
- Format: Adult hits
- Subchannels: HD2: Sports radio (97.1 The Fan KNX-FM); HD3: Sports gambling (BetQL) "The Bet L.A."

Ownership
- Owner: Audacy, Inc.; (Audacy License, LLC)
- Sister stations: KFRG; KNX; KNX-FM; KROQ-FM; KRTH; KTWV; KXFG

History
- First air date: March 30, 1948
- Former call signs: KNX-FM (1948–1983; 1986–1989); KKHR (1983–1986); KODJ (1989–1991)
- Call sign meaning: Columbia Broadcasting System (previous legal name of former owner CBS)

Technical information
- Licensing authority: FCC
- Facility ID: 9612
- Class: B
- ERP: 27,500 watts
- HAAT: 1,074 meters (3,524 ft)
- Transmitter coordinates: 34.2319°N 118.0726°W

Links
- Public license information: Public file; LMS
- Webcast: Listen live (via Audacy); Listen live (via Audacy) (HD3)
- Website: www.audacy.com/931jackfm

KCBS-FM (93.1 FM) is a commercial radio station in Los Angeles, California, serving Greater Los Angeles. It is owned by Audacy, Inc., and broadcasts an Adult hits music format branded "93.1 Jack FM".

Unlike most radio stations airing the Jack FM formula, KCBS-FM runs a fairly focused playlist of popular classic rock and modern rock tracks. Currently, the station has no DJs. The only voices heard on Jack-FM are Crystal Z and Dr.Cranfill with "Jacktivities" (events and whatever announcements deemed worthy by "Jack") and Howard Cogan supplying prerecorded quips and ironic remarks between songs. Unlike most other stations in this format, the call sign does not include any form of the word "Jack", opting instead to keep call letters tied to the station's former CBS corporate identity.

Although Jack proclaims that the station is run "in a dumpy little building in Culver City", the KCBS-FM studios and offices are actually located at 5670 Wilshire Boulevard in Los Angeles, after moving from a previous location at the corner of Fairfax and Venice in 2018. The transmitter is atop Mount Wilson. KCBS-FM broadcasts using HD Radio technology. Two digital subchannels carry sports talk and sports betting formats.

== History ==
=== The Young Sound and mellow rock ===
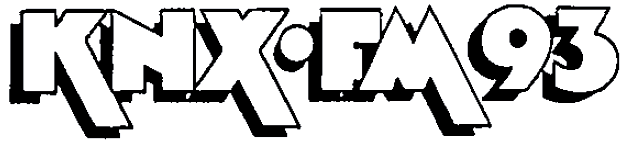
Logo as KNX-FM during the "Mellow Rock" years.

On March 30, 1948, the station signed on as KNX-FM. In its early years, KNX-FM was mostly a simulcast of sister station KNX (1070 AM). In the mid-1960s, KNX-FM, along with other CBS-owned FM radio stations, began airing an easy listening format branded as "The Young Sound". It played mostly instrumental cover versions of popular songs, but it was a bit more uptempo than competing beautiful music stations.

On January 3, 1973, KNX-FM switched to a mellow rock format, featuring artists airing on other rock stations but choosing softer selections than heard on rivals KLOS and KMET. (Volunteers launched an internet stream recreating the KNX-FM format of the 1973-1983 era in 2019, now calling itself "TheMellowSound.net, a KNX-FM 93 tribute". Another tribute website is simply "mellowrock.com" with a similar mix of mellow rock and classic features.)

=== HitRadio 93 ===
On August 25, 1983, KNX-FM adopted a contemporary hit radio music format, similar to the other CBS Radio FM stations, and branded as "HitRadio 93 KKHR", closing the soft rock format with "The Last Resort" by the Eagles at 2:43 pm, followed by a montage of its jingles over its 10-year history, and launching the Top 40 format at 3pm with "Wanna Be Startin' Somethin'" by Michael Jackson. The heritage KNX-FM call sign switched to KKHR (KK-HitRadio) the following week on September 2, 1983. KKHR was not a traditional top 40 music format of the time, as the playlist was more stringently limited to 30 songs.

The original KKHR disc jockey staff consisted of Dave Donovan (whose real name is Joe Cipriano), Chris Lance, Todd Parker (replaced by Jack Armstrong several months later), and Mark Hanson. Rich Fields, who would later become the announcer on The Price Is Right for over six seasons, also joined KKHR in the station's last year with the "HitRadio" format. Likewise, during its time as HitRadio, (just like KHTR) its jingles were produced by JAM Creative Productions.

Until 2023, the KKHR call sign was now used by an Americana/Texas country/southern rock hybrid station serving Abilene, Texas. That station is now known as KABT.

=== Mellow rock returns ===
Due to the station's lackluster ratings, the mellow rock format and heritage KNX-FM call letters were returned under the new branding "Quality Rock" in late May 1986.

KNX-FM struggled with low ratings, evolving into a "Contemporary Adult Rock" format by September 1988, and was not able to re-capture its original audience. On March 2, 1989, at 12 pm, following a day-long stunt with a ticking clock during songs and an announcement from vice president and general manager Charlie Seraphin, an oldies music format was introduced and the heritage KNX-FM call sign was dropped yet again, ending again with "End of the Line" by the Traveling Wilburys. (The KNX-FM call letters returned to the Los Angeles airwaves on December 21, 2021, when they were picked up by co-owned 97.1, formerly KNOU).

=== Oldies 93.1 ===
With the new oldies format, the station switched its call letters to KODJ and the branding changed to "Oldies 93.1", launching with "Turn! Turn! Turn!" by The Byrds. KODJ competed with crosstown oldies rival KRTH, which later came under common CBS Radio ownership when limits were relaxed by the FCC.

KODJ focused more on the 1950s and the early 1960s era of oldies music than KRTH. DJs on KODJ were The Real Don Steele, Charlie Tuna, Rich Fields (previously a DJ for the station during the late period of its Top 40 era as KKHR), Machine Gun Kelly and Jeff Serr. In response to KODJ's debut, KRTH gradually reduced and eventually faded out the number of newer songs from its playlist, focusing mainly on the 1960s decade of oldies with a few songs from the late 1950s. In addition, KRTH brought in Bill Drake as consultant while featuring all new jingles by the Johnny Mann Singers, which helped it reach higher ratings. The Real Don Steele left KCBS-FM in mid-1992 to join KRTH. Charlie Tuna, the morning host at KODJ/KCBS-FM from 1989 to 1993, would later work at KRTH from 2008 to 2014. After his tenure at The Price is Right, Rich Fields was also on KRTH for a time as well.

On July 12, 1991, at 2 pm, KODJ changed to its present call sign, KCBS-FM, as part of a re-imaging marketing campaign to bring in new listeners believing the "CBS-FM" call letters had a stronger association with the oldies format. These call letters had previously been used by two CBS-affiliated stations (now KSOL and KLLC) in San Francisco. KCBS-FM still kept the oldies format, but shifted its focus mainly to the 1960s decade of oldies with a lesser selection of 1950s oldies, and more early-1970s rock oldies to better compete with KRTH. (Since December 3, 1993, the KODJ calls have been assigned to a classic hits station in Salt Lake City, Utah.)

=== Arrow 93.1 ===
KCBS-FM struggled with low ratings, while KRTH continued to hold the majority share of the oldies market. On September 10, 1993, at 3 pm, KCBS-FM flipped to a mixed classic rock and classic hits format, and branded itself as "Arrow 93FM, All Rock and Roll Oldies". The moniker "Arrow" stood for "All Rock and Roll Oldies". The new format focused on the late 1960s and the entire 1970s decade with an emphasis on only classic rock oldies, not including adult contemporary hits, Motown, bubblegum, disco or doo-wop.

The Arbitron ratings for KCBS-FM went from 18th to 3rd place by the end of 1993, making the new format an immediate success. The station kept the KCBS-FM call letters, but would only quickly identify its call sign once at the top of the hour per FCC station identification requirements. The format would later evolve towards classic rock of the late 1960s, 1970s, and early 1980s, and re-branded itself as "Arrow 93FM, All Rock & Roll Classics" in 1996.

=== Jack-FM ===
In 2005, Infinity Broadcasting (as CBS Radio was known at the time) won the licensing rights to brand its adult hits music formatted radio stations as "Jack FM". This led to yet another format change for KCBS-FM. On March 17, (St. Patrick's Day), after an all-day stunt with music from U2 (as that band is from Ireland), the classic rock format was dropped, as "93.1 Jack FM" debuted in Los Angeles, airing an adult hits format that started in Canada and was getting picked up in numerous U.S. markets. The Jack format was a break from the heavily niched formats that had developed beginning in the 1970s. Jack was also unusual in that it employed no DJs, and had a much larger playlist than the typical classic hits or classic rock radio station.

The Los Angeles incarnation of Jack includes more modern rock titles than most Jack outlets, reflecting the local influence of KROQ-FM during its alternative heyday. Initially, KCBS-FM played a blend of pop and rock hits from the late 1960s to late 1980s, with a sprinkling of newer, sometimes almost current, tunes. Eventually, the newer songs and pop songs were phased out in favor of mostly classic rock and classic alternative. KCBS-FM is the longest-serving of all of CBS' Jack stations. CBS also introduced the Jack FM format in New York City, Las Vegas, Chicago, Dallas, Minneapolis, Seattle and Baltimore, several of which have since changed formats or been sold to new owners.

Though the station has no DJs, KCBS-FM will occasionally respond to current events, such as playing all Michael Jackson songs following his death, or spinning a celebratory tune or two following a local sports victory (especially with the Rams).

The "voice" of Jack FM is a real person named Howard Cogan. His quips which are heard between songs are created by a team of writers. As Jack became popular, Cogan moved to Los Angeles to record his comments more easily. He is also the voice-over artist for other "Jack FM" stations around the country.

In October 2008, CBS Radio chose not to move the KCBS-FM call letters to its sister station at 106.9 FM in San Francisco, after that station flipped from classic hits to an all-news simulcast of KCBS. That station remains KFRC-FM, heritage calls in themselves.

=== Entercom and Audacy ===
On February 2, 2017, CBS Radio announced it would merge with Entercom. The merger was approved on November 9, and was consummated on November 17. As part of the agreement with CBS, Entercom was given the rights to use the brand and trademarks for KCBS-FM along with sister stations WCBS-AM (now WHSQ), WCBS-FM in New York City and KCBS-AM in San Francisco for a 20-year period after which Entercom (or succeeding entity) will be required to relinquish using those call-letters.

As part of the merger, the FM radio rights to the Los Angeles Rams of the National Football League were moved to KCBS-FM from KSWD, which was sold off as part of the deal when it flipped to Christian adult contemporary format as KKLQ on November 16, 2017. The Rams broadcasts were FM only, and regular programming was exclusive to the Audacy app during game broadcasts, including in Los Angeles.

On March 30, 2021, Entercom rebranded to the corporate name "Audacy". KCBS-FM programming is found on the Audacy.com website and app.

On June 6, 2024, KCBS-FM temporarily rebranded as 93.1 Blade FM in honor of Richard Blade receiving a star on the Hollywood Walk Of Fame.

== KCBS-FM HD ==
In addition to the main Jack FM format on HD1, KCBS-FM-HD2 simulcasts KNX-FM, its co-owned sports talk station in Los Angeles. Before KNX-FM split from its AM counterpart and switched to its current format, 93.1 HD2 previously simulcasted KFRG, one of their sister stations that has an country music format and licensed to San Bernardino. Before KLSX switched from talk to CHR in 2009, 93.1 HD2 carried a CHR format with the "AMP Radio" branding.

Former sister station KFWB had been broadcasting on the KCBS-FM HD3 signal, but due to that station's sale, its signal is no longer heard on KCBS-FM. As of December 6, 2018, that signal began simulcasting all-news KNX (AM 1070). It has since carried KFRG/KXFG. On January 25, 2021, KCBS-FM-HD3 started carrying a nationally syndicated sports radio network, the BetQL Network, as "The Bet".

== See also ==
- KCBS (AM)
- KCBS-TV
- KCBS-TV/FM Tower
- KFWB (former sister station)
