= KXXZ =

- Barstow, California; United States
- Frequency: 95.9 MHz
- Branding: El Portal 95.9

Programming
- Format: Regional Mexican
- Affiliations: ABC Radio

Ownership
- Owner: California Communications of Barstow, LLC; (Dos Costas Communications Corporation)
- Sister stations: KDUC; KDUQ; KSZL

Technical information
- Licensing authority: FCC
- Facility ID: 27984
- Class: B1
- ERP: 8,900 watts
- HAAT: 148 meters (486 ft)
- Transmitter coordinates: 34°51′22″N 117°3′0″W

Links
- Public license information: Public file; LMS
- Website: mikegradio.wix.com/elportal959fm

KXXZ (95.9 MHz), "El Portal 95.9") is a commercial radio station that is licensed to Barstow, California, United States. The station is owned by California Communications of Barstow, LLC and broadcasts a regional Mexican format featuring programming syndicated by ABC Radio.

== History ==
KXXZ was first signed on in 1989 by Hub Broadcasting Inc. with an album-oriented rock format as 95.9 The Burner.

In 1999, Hub Broadcasting sold KXXZ to Tele-Media Broadcasting LLC, headed by Robert Tudek, for $600,000. At the time, the station aired a classic hits format.

In June 2008, Dos Costas Communications Corporation sold KXXZ and sister stations KDUC, KDUQ, and KSZL to California Communications of Barstow, LLC for $4.3 million.
