= KNX (AM) =

Clear-channel news radio station in Los Angeles, California

- Los Angeles, California; United States
- Broadcast area: Southern California
- Frequency: 1070 kHz
- Branding: KNX News

Programming
- Language: English
- Format: All-news radio
- Affiliations: ABC News Radio; Bloomberg Radio; The Weather Channel; KCBS-TV

Ownership
- Owner: Audacy, Inc.; (Audacy License, LLC)
- Sister stations: KCBS-FM; KFRG; KNX-FM; KROQ-FM; KRTH; KTWV; KXFG

History
- Founded: September 10, 1920
- First air date: December 8, 1921
- Former call signs: 6ADZ (1920–1921); KGC (1921–1922)
- Call sign meaning: Randomly assigned. A backronym explanation suggested it came from the Spring Street Arcade Annex.

Technical information
- Licensing authority: FCC
- Facility ID: 9616
- Class: A
- Power: 50,000 watts (unlimited)
- Transmitter coordinates: 33°51′35″N 118°20′59″W (main); 33°51′38″N 118°20′57″W (aux)
- Repeater: 97.1 KNX-FM-HD2 (Los Angeles)

Links
- Public license information: Public file; LMS
- Webcast: Listen live (via Audacy)
- Website: www.audacy.com/knxnews

KNX (1070 kHz) is a commercial all-news AM radio station in Los Angeles, California, owned by Audacy, Inc. KNX is one of the oldest stations in the United States, having received its first broadcasting license, as KGC, on December 8, 1921, in addition to tracing its history to the September 1920 operations of an earlier amateur station. The radio studios and offices—shared with KNX-FM, KCBS-FM, KROQ-FM, KRTH and KTWV—are located on Wilshire Boulevard, along Los Angeles' Miracle Mile.

KNX holds a class A license as one of the original clear-channel stations. Its 50,000-watt non-directional signal is heard throughout all of Southern California in the daytime. When conditions are right, it can be picked up at night throughout much of the Western United States and parts of Mexico and Canada. The station is even received by DXers in Hawaii and across the Pacific Ocean. The transmitter site is in Columbia Park in Torrance, near Hawthorne Boulevard (California State Route 107) and 190th Street. KNX is authorized to broadcast a digital HD Radio signal.

KNX and KFI are the local primary stations for the Los Angeles Emergency Alert System. They are responsible for activation of the EAS when hazardous weather alerts, and disaster area declarations are issued.

== Programming ==
KNX broadcasts "traffic and weather together" every 10 minutes on the fives with traffic reports on the freeways and toll roads in the Greater Los Angeles area and weather forecasts for Southern California, 24 hours a day, seven days a week. Local news coverage include the latest news from the Los Angeles City Council, Los Angeles County Board of Supervisors and public safety. Business news from Bloomberg Radio headlines and weather from KCBS-TV/KCAL-TV are heard every half hour. Each hour begins with world and national news from ABC News Radio.

From December 2021 until May 2026, KNX was also simulcast on KNX-FM (97.1 FM) which previously aired a CHR format; the two stations were branded as "KNX News 97-1 FM". During this period, the simulcast between the AM and FM stations was temporarily broken on Saturday mornings as the AM signal broadcast brokered programming while the all-news format continued on the FM signal with the simulcast resuming for the remainder of the day.

== History ==
=== Origin ===
Although KNX received its first broadcasting station license on December 8, 1921, the station has traditionally dated its founding to September 10, 1920, reflecting broadcasts conducted by Fred Christian over his amateur station, 6ADZ.

Christian was a former shipboard radio operator, who lived at 5118 1/2 Harold Way in Hollywood, California, and was the manager of the Electric Lighting Supply Company at 216 West Third Street, Los Angeles. He later explained that he began the broadcasts in order to provide something to listen to by customers who had constructed receivers from parts purchased at the store. Christian began making broadcasts with a five-watt vacuum-tube transmitter, operating on the standard amateur wavelength of 200 meters (1500 kHz).

=== KGC ===
Initially there were no specific standards in the United States for radio stations making transmissions intended for the general public, and numerous stations under various classifications made entertainment broadcasts. However, effective December 1, 1921, the Department of Commerce, regulators of radio at this time, adopted a regulation that formally created a broadcasting station category, and stations were now required to hold a Limited Commercial license authorizing operation on wavelengths of 360 meters (833 kHz) for "entertainment" broadcasts or 485 meters (619 kHz) for "market and weather reports". By the end of 1922, over 500 stations were authorized nationwide.

On December 8, 1921, the Electric Lighting Supply Company was issued a broadcasting station license with the randomly assigned call letters KGC, the second in the county after KQL, authorizing operation on the 360-meter entertainment wavelength. The station's location was listed as Fred Christian's Harold Way home. The shared 360 meter wavelength required timesharing agreements between an increasing number of stations needing exclusive time periods. On May 4 the Los Angeles Times reported that a total of seven local stations were slated to make broadcasts that day, comprising a schedule that ran from noon to 9 p.m., with KGC assigned 2-2:30 and 7:30-8 p.m.

=== KNX ===
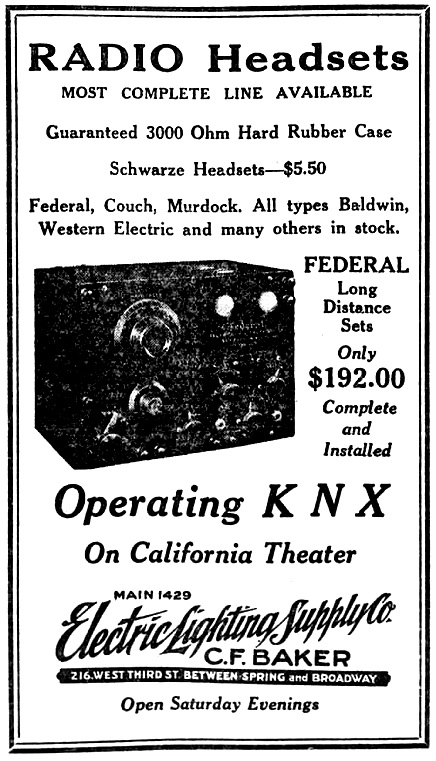
April 1923 Electric Lighting Supply Company advertisement promoting its operation of KNX at the California Theater.

On May 4, 1922, the Electric Lighting Supply Company was issued a broadcasting license for a station with the randomly assigned call letters of KNX, also on 360 meters, and located at the company's Los Angeles store on West Third Street. This was technically considered to be a second station in addition to KGC, however, after KGC was formally deleted on June 20, 1922, the Department of Commerce concluded that KGC and KNX were functionally the same station, and Federal Communications Commission (FCC) records list KGC's initial license date, December 8, 1921, as KNX's "date first licensed".

The new authorization coincided with preparations for a move to the California Theater, broadcasting live music, with Fred Christian continuing as station manager. On June 12, 1922, the Los Angeles Times reported that "After more than two months of preparation, the new broadcast station at the California Theater had its opening program Saturday evening at 9:15, sending out a wavelength of 510 meters [588 kHz]. The station is said to be one of the best in the land, the call letters of which are KNX." KNX's regular broadcast schedule on 360 meters was 9:00 to 10:00 a.m. A week after it commenced operations from the theater, the Times reported that "Numerous reports have come into The Times radio department commending the quality and audibility of material broadcast from KNX, the California Theater radiophone. This station differs from other stations in that it gives its listeners-in the music of the complete orchestra of the California Theater."

KNX's power was raised to 100 watts in early August 1922.

=== Los Angeles Evening Express ===
In the fall of 1924, Guy Earl Jr., owner of the Los Angeles Evening Express, arranged for the newspaper's purchase of KNX. The Express made significant upgrades, including increasing the power to 500 watts, and began broadcasting from the Paul G. Hoffman Studebaker building in Hollywood. KNX was one of the last stations to remain on the original 360 meter wavelength, and the newspaper engineered a move to 890 kHz. It remained on this frequency until November 11, 1928, when the station was reassigned to 1050 kHz, under the provisions of a major reallocation resulting from the Federal Radio Commission's (FRC) General Order 40.

In early 1928, Guy Earle sold his share of the Evening Express newspaper and reorganized KNX as the Western Broadcast Company. In 1929, Earle moved the KNX studios to the Paramount Pictures lot, signing a five-year contract, and the station's transmitter power was upgraded from 500 to 5,000 watts. In 1930, KNX became the first station to broadcast the Academy Awards. In 1932, it increased to 10,000 watts. In 1933, the station moved its studios to the former Peerless Motor Company building at 5939 Sunset Boulevard in Hollywood, after being granted permission by the FRC on June 7, 1932, to raise its output to 25,000 watts. The following year, KNX's transmitting power was raised to the nationwide maximum of 50,000 watts, which the station continues presently.

=== CBS ownership ===
CBS purchased KNX in 1936, and began operating it as its West Coast flagship, which ended CBS's eight-year affiliation with KHJ. In 1938, the CBS Columbia Square studios were dedicated for KNX as well as West Coast operations for the entire CBS radio network. That October, the station carried Orson Welles' celebrated version of The War of the Worlds. In March 1941, the station was shifted to 1070 AM as part of the North American Regional Broadcasting Agreement assignments, where it has been ever since.

Theatre legend Jerome Lawrence got his start in radio writing at KNX in the late 1930s. Legendary performers from the "Golden Age of Radio" used KNX studios for their national broadcasts, included Jack Benny, Bing Crosby, George Burns, Edgar Bergen and Gene Autry. Steve Allen conducted a freewheeling late night show over KNX in the late 1940s, which opened the door to his national success. TV situation comedy star Bob Crane was KNX's morning host between 1957 and 1965 at the same time he was appearing as a featured supporting player on the ABC television network series The Donna Reed Show.

=== FM and TV stations ===
On March 30, 1948, KNX added a sister station. The original station with the call sign KNX-FM signed on the air, mostly simulcasting 1070 AM. At first it was on the old FM band, but switched to 93.1 a few years later. Today that station is KCBS-FM, while a new version of KNX-FM exists today on 97.1 as a simulcast of the AM station.

In 1951, KNX gained a television cousin when CBS acquired KTSL channel 2 and rebranded it as KNXT. It took on the current KCBS-TV call sign in 1984. It traces its history back to 1930s experimental broadcasts and was originally owned by broadcast pioneer Don Lee.

=== Switch to all-news ===
Logo as "KNX 1070 Newsradio", used until the start of the simulcast on 97.1 FM

KNX was a strong competitor in the Los Angeles market while Bob Crane was its morning personality, but began declining in popularity after he left to star in the CBS television series Hogan's Heroes. Following the example of corporate sister station WCBS in New York City, which had enjoyed success with an all-news format, KNX then became an all-news station in the spring of 1968. By chance, its first major breaking news coverage was a major worldwide story that happened locally: the assassination of Democratic Presidential candidate Robert F. Kennedy, in the Ambassador Hotel in Los Angeles, on June 5 of that year.

In August 2005, KNX moved out of Columbia Square after operating there for 67 years, and began broadcasting from new studios in the Miracle Mile district on Wilshire Boulevard.

In 2009, KNX adopted the slogan "All news, all the time". It was previously used for 40 years by KFWB, KNX's historic rival in the news radio wars before both became sister stations through the 1995 merger of Westinghouse Electric (KFWB's owner) and CBS. KFWB's format change to news/talk in September 2009, left KNX as the only all-news outlet in the Los Angeles area, which is now emphasized in its alternate slogan, "Southern California's only 24-hour local news & traffic station".

In 2017, KNX won its first ever national Edward R. Murrow award for "Breaking News". The station was also nominated for two 2017 NAB Marconi awards, Legendary Station of the Year and News/Talk Station of the Year.

=== Entercom and Audacy ===
On February 2, 2017, CBS agreed to merge CBS Radio with Entercom, then the fourth-largest radio broadcaster in the United States. The sale was conducted tax-free using a Reverse Morris Trust. While CBS shareholders retained a 72% ownership stake in the combined company, Entercom was the surviving entity, separating KNX from KCBS-TV and KCAL-TV. The merger was approved on November 9, and was consummated 8 days later.

On March 30, 2021, Entercom announced that the company changed its name to Audacy.

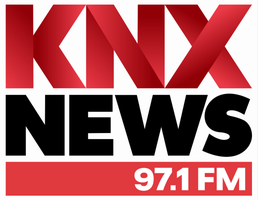
KNX logo used from 2021-2023

On December 6, 2021, KNX announced that it would be adding an FM simulcast. KNX's all-news programming would also be heard on sister station KNOU, replacing the Top 40 format on the station that began in 2009. KNOU changed its call letters to KNX-FM on December 21, 2021, to match its AM simulcast partner.

On December 9, 2025, KNX began simulcasting with sister all news station KCBS (AM) between midnight and 5 am. News, traffic and weather reports are combined to cover both Los Angeles and the San Francisco Bay Area and originate from KCBS in San Francisco.

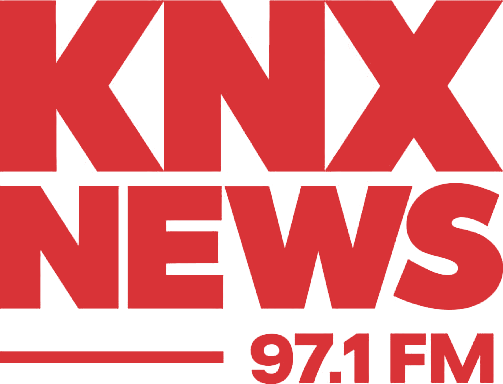
KNX logo used from 2023-2026

On April 28, 2026, Audacy announced it would be ending the FM simulcast of KNX on 97.1 FM on May 18 as it flips that station to a sports radio format as 97.1 The Fan; the station will continue to be heard on 1070 AM along with 97.1 FM’s HD2 subchannel and the Audacy app.

On May 21, 2026 at 2 p.m., KNX transitioned to airing top-of-hour national news updates from ABC News Radio — ahead of CBS News Radio’s dissolution the following day. A move mirroring most other Audacy all-news and news-talk stations, the switch to ABC News Radio marks the end of one of KNX’s last-remaining, nearly century-long links with CBS News and CBS — its original parent company.

== Transmitter site ==
The station's antenna array features a 494-foot (150m) main antenna. The original main tower (circa 1936) was destroyed by vandals on September 14, 1965. An unused 365-foot (111m) tower was brought in from KFAC (now KWKW) and was used while the new main antenna was constructed. This antenna was formerly in what is now a residential area to the south of the main antenna.

The 365-foot tower now serves as KNX's emergency antenna. It was later relocated when much of the site was dedicated as a park in Torrance. It is now north of the main antenna, within the park.

Only one antenna is active at a time. An experiment in the late 1960s, using both antennas in a directional setup during the daytime was abandoned.

The 494-foot main antenna is 0.53λ, or 193.5 electrical degrees. It has an efficiency of 400.73 mV/m/kW at 1 km. This is much better than average for a Class A station's main antenna. The FCC's minimum efficiency requirement is 362.10 mV/m/kW at 1 km.

The 365-foot emergency antenna is 0.40λ, or 145.5 electrical degrees. It has an efficiency of about 343 mV/m/kW at 1 km. This is much better than average for a Class A emergency antenna but is inadequate for the main antenna.

== Notable former on-air staff ==
- Steve Allen—former late night host. (deceased)
- Pete Arbogast – news and sports anchor. Longtime broadcaster for USC Trojans Football from 1989 to 1994 and since 2001.
- Bill Ballance (deceased)
- Bob Barker (deceased)
- Bob Crane (deceased)
- Michael Fitzmaurice (using the name Mike Kelly) (deceased)
- Chet Huntley (special events) and news commentary (deceased)
- Bill Keene – traffic reporter best known for nicknames of freeway interchanges. (deceased)
- Knox Manning – (newscaster) (deceased)
- Gil Stratton – longtime sportscaster who worked with KNXT and KNX on and off from 1954 to 1997. (deceased)
- Jim Thornton – news and traffic anchor. Also the off-screen voice of Wheel of Fortune from 2011 to 2026.
- Larry Van Nuys
- Dave Zorn (deceased)
- Jennifer York – traffic reporter
- Dick Helton
- Pat Sajak – weather reporter

== Current on-air staff ==
- Margaret Carrero - AM Drive Anchor
- Mike Simpson - AM Drive Anchor
- Sabina Mora – AM Drive Traffic
- Alex Silverman - Midday & PM Drive Anchor
- Brian Douglas - Midday & PM Drive Anchor
- Sioux-z Jessup - Midday Traffic
- Scott Burt - PM Drive Traffic
- Chris Sedens – Evening news anchor
- Art Sanders - Overnight news anchor
- Bob Brill - Overnight & weekend evening news anchor
- Nataly Tavidian – General assignment news reporter
- Emily Valdez – General assignment news reporter
- Karen Adams – General assignment news reporter
- John Baird – AM Drive general assignment news reporter
- Craig Fiegener – Los Angeles City Hall news reporter
- Pete Demitriou – Public safety reporter
- Brian Ping – Weekend Anchor
- Larry Perel - Weekend Anchor
- Manny Pacheco - Weekend Traffic
- Rick Smith - Weekend Traffic
- Lew Stowers - Weekend Traffic
- Heather Jordan - Feature Reporter
- Steve Gregory - Special Correspondent
- Susanne Whatley - Weekend Anchor

== See also ==
- KCBS-FM
- KCBS-TV
- CBS Columbia Square
- List of initial AM-band station grants in the United States
