= Larry Mantle =

American journalist (born 1959)

- Born: Los Angeles County, California, U.S.
- Education: Vanguard University
- Occupation: Radio show host
- Spouse: Kristen Hernandez
- Children: Desmond Mantle

Larry Mantle is an American radio talk show host and journalist on the Southern California National Public Radio station, LAist (formerly KPCC). Mantle hosts AirTalk with Larry Mantle, which is the longest running daily talk show currently on Los Angeles radio. It has been on the air since April 1, 1985. Mantle began his professional broadcasting career in 1980.

AirTalk's interview/call-in format includes guests and topics focused on local news, politics, science, the arts, entertainment and more. Some segments are devoted to listeners calling in with their analysis or experiences related to a current issue.

Mantle is also the host of FilmWeek, which airs Fridays 10-11am and 10-11pm, and Saturdays 12-1pm which includes interviews with actors, directors, screenwriters, and others essential in making films.

== Notable interviewees ==
Mantle has interviewed presidents Barack Obama, Joe Biden, and Jimmy Carter, along with governors, senators, cabinet members, and other high-ranking public officials. These guests include Hillary Clinton and Rosa Parks.

AirTalk also covers entertainment and culture, with guests including Aretha Franklin, Steve Martin, Quentin Tarantino, Christopher Nolan, Martin Scorsese, Herbie Hancock, Jennifer Lawrence, Quincy Jones, and Arturo Sandoval.

== Early life and education ==
Mantle is a fourth-generation Angeleno, who grew up in Baldwin Hills, Inglewood, and Hollywood.

Mantle was born to teenage parents John Mantle and Carole Hubka (now Morse). They raised Mantle in close contact with his grandparents and great grandparents, who helped develop Mantle's appreciation for the dynamism of Los Angeles.

After graduating from high school, Mantle went to Southern California College in Costa Mesa, California. Mantle graduated in 1979 with a degree in psychology.

Mantle studied briefly at Fuller Theological Seminary in Pasadena, before concluding the ministry was not a good fit. His first wife, Constance, encouraged him to pursue a career in radio, given his love of the medium.

== AirTalk origin ==
While in graduate school, Mantle was living in Pasadena and listened to NPR's All Things Considered on KPCC. He knew that KPCC also produced a daily one-hour local news program and used community volunteers and Pasadena City College students to supplement a small professional staff. Mantle started volunteering at KPCC and was soon anchoring newscasts and providing play-by-play of college and high school sports carried by the station. Later, Mantle became the first local Morning Edition host for KPCC.

After briefly working for CBS newstalk affiliate KPRO in Riverside, Mantle returned to KPCC as news director in 1983. Two years later, Mantle launched AirTalk with the intention of combining listener calls from an analytical and news savvy audience with local experts and newsmakers. The format of the program has remained much the same over AirTalk's history. However, the number of daily segments and production staff has grown.

== Personal life ==
Mantle is married to speech-language pathologist Kristen Mantle (née Hernandez). They have a son, who is currently studying at Stanford University’s School of Law.

Mantle is a devoted fan of the Los Angeles sports teams, most prominently the Dodgers, Lakers, and Rams.

== Awards and other work ==
Mantle has received recognition from the Los Angeles Press Club.

Mantle is also on the board of directors for the 8 Ball Emergency Fund for Journalists.
