= KTWV =

Rhythmic adult contemporary radio station in Los Angeles

- Los Angeles, California; United States
- Broadcast area: Greater Los Angeles
- Frequency: 94.7 MHz (HD Radio)
- Branding: 94.7 The Wave

Programming
- Language: English
- Format: Rhythmic adult contemporary
- Subchannels: HD2: Armenian music "Nor Radio"; HD3: Persian-language programming "Radio Hamrah"

Ownership
- Owner: Audacy, Inc.; (Audacy License, LLC)
- Sister stations: KCBS-FM; KFRG; KNX; KNX-FM; KROQ-FM; KRTH; KXFG

History
- First air date: September 1948
- Former call signs: KFMV (1948–1952); KFWB-FM (1952–1956); KRHM (1956–1965); KLAC-FM (1965–1966); KMET (1966–1987); KTWV-FM (1987)
- Call sign meaning: "The Wave"

Technical information
- Licensing authority: FCC
- Facility ID: 25437
- Class: B
- ERP: 58,000 watts
- HAAT: 863.0 meters (2,831.4 ft)
- Transmitter coordinates: 34.225°N 118.064°W
- Translator: 96.7 K244AM (China Lake)

Links
- Public license information: Public file; LMS
- Webcast: Listen live (via Audacy); Listen live (via iHeartRadio); Listen Live (HD2)
- Website: www.audacy.com/947thewave; www.norradio.com (HD2); radiohamrah.com (HD3)

KTWV (94.7 FM) is a commercial radio station licensed to Los Angeles, California, and broadcasting to the Greater Los Angeles area. The station is owned by Audacy, Inc., and airs a rhythmic adult contemporary format. KTWV has studios on Wilshire Boulevard in the Miracle Mile district of Los Angeles. As "94.7 The Wave", the station was known for pioneering the smooth jazz radio format in the late 1980s.

KTWV has an effective radiated power (ERP) of 58,000 watts. The transmitter is shared with former sister station KTTV, and is on Mount Wilson. KTWV broadcasts using HD Radio technology, with an Armenian music format on its HD2 digital subchannel and Persian-language programming currently on its HD3 subchannel.

== History ==
=== Early years (1961–1968) ===
On March 7, 1961, KLAC-FM first signed on the air over the 102.7 frequency. It served as an FM sister station to KLAC (570 AM), simulcasting its programming. KLAC-AM-FM were purchased by Metromedia in 1963. The FM station would later switch frequencies in 1965 with KRHM (94.7 FM). By the mid-1960s, the FCC wanted FM sisters to AM stations to air separate programming; thus, KLAC-FM became an automated station, playing a mix of middle-of-the-road and big band music like other FM stations owned by Metromedia. In order to separate itself further from its AM sister, the station changed its call sign to KMET on May 2, 1966.

=== KMET — The Mighty Met (1968–1987) ===
A few years after the station adopted its new call sign, Tom Donahue convinced Metromedia to establish a freeform rock format on KMET and KSFR in San Francisco (which then became KSAN) after a dispute with the owners of KPPC-FM. Donahue brought over most of those who went on strike at KPPC, including his Los Angeles tag team partner in former KFWB "Swinging Gentleman" B. Mitchel Reed. He had become enamored with the underground rock sound after attending the Monterey Pop Festival and shortly afterward bonded with fellow top 40 veteran Donahue over their increasing unhappiness with AM radio and its restrictions.

The KPPC format was only mildly successful. After leaving KROQ and KROQ-FM, Shadoe Stevens was hired by General Manager L. David Moorhead in 1974 to create something new for the struggling format KMET had put in place. With a staff that included B. Mitchell Reed, Stevens, Jimmy Rabbitt, Brother John, and Mary ("The Burner") Turner, Stevens introduced a new rock format that retained some of Donahue's progressive freedom but gave it energy and consistency that featured programming and high production values similar to those that had been integrated at KROQ. Stevens also designed a futuristic billboard campaign called "Hollywood as seen from Mulholland Drive in the year 2525".

An original KMET bumper sticker. The follow-up to the Hollywood billboard created by Stevens had big, bold letters and the logo was presented backwards and upside down. The bumper stickers were intentionally displayed upside down by the station's fans as well.

Artist Neon Park did ads for KMET as well as the famous billboards. With this new programming design and branded marketing, in 1975, KMET became the number one radio station in Los Angeles.http://www.shadoe.com/kroq-kmet-fm.html

KMET's station identification jingle, "A Little Bit of Heaven, Ninety-Four Point Seven - KMET - Tweedle-Dee" was originally written by Shadoe Stevens and the song was sung by the Pointer Sisters during an interview on his show. This ID "jingle" came to be emblematic for KMET.

KMET often mixed counterculture comedy skits by the Firesign Theatre and the Credibility Gap with the music. The Credibility Gap broadcast satirical skits during Pasadena's Tournament of Roses Parade in the 1970s.

The 1978 movie FM, written by former employee Ezra Sacks, was reportedly loosely based on KMET. The lead character was based around Mike Herrington, the program director for much of the era preceding the film. Much of the history of KMET is documented in Jim Ladd's book Radio Waves, where the station is referred to as Radio KAOS and many of the DJs are given pseudonyms. Arguably, 1978 was the pinnacle year at the station. The line-up was impressive. Jeff Gonzer, Bob Coburn, Cynthia Fox, Jack Snyder, Mary Turner, and Jim Ladd. Ace Young and Patrick 'Paraquat' Kelley provided the breaking news and views of the day.

KMET became legendary and popular as "The Mighty 'MET" for its freeform style in letting DJs choose the music without genre restrictions and an irreverent, loose and laidback presentation of the music. In the early 1980s, however, Metromedia changed the presentation and sound of KMET to a more conventional album-oriented rock (AOR) format. In the process, KMET quickly became a shell of its former self: playlists were tightened and hit-oriented, disc jockeys became less personal in their presentation, and the station was heavily constructed by outside consultants.

This drove KMET's ratings down to the point of being well behind established AOR pioneer KLOS as well as behind KROQ-FM, a station that rose from the ashes of KPPC-FM to become the trademark radio home in Los Angeles for the new wave and punk scenes in the 1980s. Then, in 1986, KMET got two new competitors that hurt the station irrevocably: KNAC, who targeted younger listeners via the budding heavy metal genre that KMET wouldn't touch and more aggressively than KLOS and KROQ, and KLSX, who targeted older listeners with the music that KMET made famous through the newly created classic rock format. Both stations ate further into KMET's ratings immediately.

Additionally in 1986, Metromedia — which already sold off its TV stations (including KTTV) to News Corporation — sold KMET and eight other stations for $250 million to a group of investors who renamed the company Metropolitan Broadcasting.

KMET is also notable for broadcasting the program The Mighty METal Hour, which was hosted by Jim Ladd on Friday nights from 10PM to midnight, and showcased the music of many then-up-and-coming hard rock and heavy metal bands, including Metallica, Slayer, Megadeth, Anthrax, Iron Maiden, Queensrÿche, Mötley Crüe, Motörhead, Y&T, Metal Church, Great White, Armored Saint, Dio, W.A.S.P., Ratt, Quiet Riot, Twisted Sister, Saxon, Riot, Loudness, Warrior and Agent Steel.

==== End of the Mighty Met ====
The new competition combined with the existing double threat of KLOS and KROQ-FM all drove KMET's ratings to a low of 1.6 by January 1987. While a plan was considered to refocus the station on newer rock with a suggested "94.7% Pure Rock" branding, it would be met with considerable backlash, with programming director Frank Cody recalling finding on the station's parking lot a visual metaphor someone had left as to how it would look for the station- a Heinz ketchup bottle filled with mustard. Cody, with the assistance of VP/GM Howard Bloom, then set out to research a new format for 94.7 FM. They arrived at a format that mixed new age, compatible jazz/fusion, and soft vocals. It became known in the trade as New Adult Contemporary (NAC).

On February 6, 1987, four days after making the format decision, the entire KMET air staff was summoned one by one to the Sheraton Premiere Hotel in Universal City where they were told by Bloom and Cody they were being let go and the station was changing formats. The last live jock on the air that day was morning man Paraquat Kelly. He got word of what was happening, and at the end of his shift played "Beautiful Losers" by Bob Seger (dedicated to his co-workers) and "It's Only Rock 'n Roll (But I Like It)" by The Rolling Stones (for KMET itself). Choked with emotion, his last words were "We all love you. Goodbye, Southern California. This is KMET, the Mighty 'MET." At that time, the station went jockless and automated while playing an ominous countdown to noon on February 14, 1987 set to the opening bars of Tangerine Dream's "Sunset Drive".

Valentine's Day 1987 would be known as the "St. Valentine's Day Massacre" for Los Angeles rock fans. The last hour featured sentimental songs "My Generation" by The Who and "You're All I've Got Tonight" by The Cars, and California-inspired songs "L.A. Woman" by The Doors and "Hotel California" by The Eagles wrapped around classic KMET IDs by Tom Donahue and B. Mitchel Reed. Nearly 19 years of rock came to an end with "Funeral for a Friend" by Elton John, "Born to Run" by Bruce Springsteen, and then the second half of the Abbey Road medley by The Beatles with "Golden Slumbers", "Carry That Weight" and then ending with (appropriately) "The End".

The fired KMET jocks were given the chance to give a full goodbye to listeners via on-air tributes from their former rivals KLOS and KLSX. They then were split between those two and KSCA, which would be launched by Gene Autry's Golden West Broadcasters that fall. KSCA and future eclectic rock station KSWD (which notably had multiple on-air tributes to KMET during its run) would both pay tribute to KMET's closing by themselves closing with Abbey Road with the former repeating KMET's closing (and signing off after playing the hidden finale "Her Majesty") and the latter playing all of Side 2 from "Here Comes the Sun" through "The End".

It signed off permanently on February 14, 1987 after a 21-year run on air. It signed off its album rock format at noon with The Beatles' "Golden Slumbers Medley" (Golden Slumbers / Carry That Weight / The End).

==== Tributes ====
A KMET sign was shown in the outro of Lupin the 3rd Part III, alongside other locations from Los Angeles at the time.

On June 21, 2009, Los Angeles radio station KSWD ("The Sound 100.3") announced that on July 10, 2009, it would do a one-day revival of KMET complete with the original airchecks and many of the on-air staff from the station's heyday. The Sound had another KMET reunion from November 1 to 3, 2013.

==== On-air staff ====
Notable on-air staff included:

- Richard Beebe
- Barbara Birdfeather (1969–1971)
- Damion Bragdon, aka "Damion"
- Bob Coburn (Rockline)
- Al "Jazzbo" Collins (1966)
- Dr. Demento
- Raechel Donahue
- Tom Donahue
- Bob Griffith
- Jim Ladd
- Pat Martin (broadcaster)
- Deirdre O'Donoghue (Breakfast with the Beatles) (1983-?)
- Martin Perlich
- Jim Pewter (1970–1973)
- B. Mitchel Reed
- William (Rosko) Mercer
- Frazer Smith
- Shadoe Stevens
- Bill Todd

=== KTWV - 94.7 The Wave (1987–present) ===
==== New Adult Contemporary/Smooth Jazz (1987–2010) ====
On February 14, 1987, at noon, the station flipped to the new format initially dubbed New Adult Contemporary (NAC) as "94.7 The Wave" with the new callsign KTWV. The first songs on "The Wave" were "If You Love Somebody Set Them Free" by Sting followed by "Maputo" by Bob James and David Sanborn. The KMET call letters were picked up a few weeks later by an AM station in the nearby Riverside-San Bernardino market that currently airs a Talk format.

In its first 19 months, management referred to The Wave as a "mood service" rather than a radio station; the only live voices were those of personalities from Financial News Network doing news updates and traffic reports. In lieu of an airstaff, listeners were encouraged to call a special "Wave Line" to learn what music was being played and the music itself was wrapped around pre-recorded vignettes dubbed "Playlets" featuring "ordinary people" (actors) in unique everyday situations based upon the date and time they played.

The launch of "The Wave" prompted stations in other markets to adopt the NAC format. Markets that flipped to the NAC format over the course of 1987 included San Francisco (KKSF), Chicago (WNUA), Seattle (KNUA), San Diego (KIFM), Dallas/Fort Worth (KOAI), Washington, D.C. (WBMW), and New York (WQCD), albeit all with a more traditional radio presentation with airstaff. Metropolitan Broadcasting also began offering a syndicated version of the "Wave" format via the Satellite Music Network to other markets, many ironically competing against these traditional stations, including in San Diego (KSWV), Kansas City (KCWV), Denver (KHIH), Chicago (WTWV), Detroit (WVAE), and Cleveland (WNWV). Additionally, from 2000 to 2011, there was a station in Hamilton, Ontario, Canada modeled entirely after KTWV, CIWV-FM (which also served nearby Toronto). That station used the moniker "The Wave" with a similar logo to KTWV and also broadcast on 94.7 FM.

Ratings for KTWV's initial presentation were weaker than initially hoped, and the "Playlets" soon began to be limited to only the top of the hour by June. Eventually, Frank Cody left to be a radio consultant for the budding NAC format (and he also later created the term "smooth jazz"), and John Sebastian (former programmer of KHJ who had launched similar sounding WBMW in Washington, D.C. months prior) was hired as KTWV's new program director. He promptly dropped the playlets entirely, expanded the playlist, and hired an airstaff of live jocks who started on September 19, 1988. The core group of these included Danny Martizen, David Hirsch, Don Burns, Talaya Trigueros, Keri Tombazian, Amy Hiatt and Bob Dearborn. The syndicated "Wave" began to wind down (although it did copy KTWV in adding live jocks before the network's closure); only Cleveland's WNWV remained with the format under local operation until 2019 (excluding from 2009 to 2011, when it was aired on an HD Radio subchannel of WNWV).

By the early 1990s, like most NAC stations launched at the same time as KTWV, the station began dropping its new age and jazz fusion elements in favor of a simpler blend of contemporary jazz, soft R&B vocals, and soft adult contemporary crossover hits; this new mix would define the new smooth jazz label for the format going forward. The format continued to be modestly successful and would get another national expansion in the mid 1990s as well. As the 21st century dawned, however, the same things that led KMET down ratings-wise (tightly formatted playlists and blanding presentation, among other things) would start to plague the Smooth Jazz format led by KTWV, made fully clear until the industry's adoption of the PPM system in the mid 2000s which changed the way listenership was measured. Many of the stations that launched in KTWV's 1987 shadow promptly began flipping out of the format as a result.

==== Evolutions (2010–present) ====
In February 2010, KTWV, under former KOST Program Director Jhani Kaye, moved the station to a smooth adult contemporary direction directly competing with KOST by increasing the amount of crossover vocals and dramatically reducing the number of instrumentals played (with those remaining being pop covers or format basics) with all references to "Smooth Jazz' dropped. With this change, original Wave airstaffers Don Burns (who had transitioned to Voice-tracking from his home in Palm Springs) and Keri Tombazian were both let go. From May 2010 to June 2012, former KOST morning host Kim Amidon co-hosted mornings with Pat Prescott, who previously had co-hosted with both Dave Koz and Brian McKnight.

In November 2013, KTWV introduced a revamped logo, still utilizing the font from the 1987 logo while dumping the original "Wave" graphic, and increased the amount of R&B vocals under the "Smooth R&B" branding. June 2014 saw the return of longtime assistant PD Ralph Stewart, who became program director and reintroduced mainstream AC/pop crossovers into the playlist. In February 2015, after the flip of KHHT from rhythmic oldies to urban contemporary as KRRL, KTWV shifted further to urban adult contemporary by adding more classic soul and classic and current R&B to fill the void of KHHT's departure, adopted a new "Soul of Southern California" slogan, and dropped most of the mainstream AC/pop crossovers, firmly positioning KTWV against KJLH. It also adopted a new logo that removed all remaining elements of the original 1987 Wave logo. Following these changes, KTWV's ratings drastically improved to the point it now consistently rates among the Los Angeles market's top five or ten stations in monthly demographics.

On February 2, 2017, CBS Radio announced it would merge with Entercom. The merger was approved on November 9, 2017, and closed on November 17.

In April 2019, Talaya Trigueros exited KTWV in a round of budget cuts at the station after over 30 years in middays. Trigueros, who originally began under just her first name, had been the last remaining jock from the original group hired by John Sebastian in 1988.

On March 30, 2021, Entercom renamed itself as Audacy to clarify its position as a multi-platform audio entertainment company.

== HD Programming ==
KTWV broadcasts in HD Radio on three digital subchannels:

- KTWV-HD1 is a digital simulcast of the analog signal.
- KTWV-HD2 aired a Rhythmic contemporary format and is branded as "The AVE". It now airs a Dance/EDM format.
- KTWV-HD3 broadcasts Persian-language programming as "Radio Hamrah". The format was previously launched on KTWV-HD2 on November 15, 2017, after former provider KSWD was sold to Educational Media Foundation.

== Superpower status ==
KTWV is a "Superpower" grandfathered Class B FM station. Under normal FCC regulations, KTWV would be allowed to broadcast with a maximum ERP of 930 watts at the same antenna height of 863 meters. The station currently broadcasts at 58 kW, more than 20 times as much as the power they would be allowed today. This station, along with several other L.A.-area FM stations, went on the air before power regulations took effect in 1962.
