= KFRG =

Radio station in San Bernardino, California

- San Bernardino, California; United States
- Broadcast area: Inland Empire; Orange County; Los Angeles County
- Frequency: 95.1 MHz (HD Radio)
- Branding: 95.1 K-FROG

Programming
- Format: Country music

Ownership
- Owner: Audacy, Inc.; (Audacy License, LLC)
- Sister stations: KCBS-FM; KNX; KNX-FM; KROQ-FM; KRTH; KTWV; KXFG

History
- First air date: August 4, 1974
- Former call signs: KQLH (1974–1989)
- Call sign meaning: "K-FROG"

Technical information
- Licensing authority: FCC
- Facility ID: 1241
- Class: B
- ERP: 50,000 watts
- HAAT: 149 meters (489 ft)
- Transmitter coordinates: 34.1975°N 117.2870°W
- Repeater: 92.9 KXFG (Menifee)

Links
- Public license information: Public file; LMS
- Webcast: Listen live (via Audacy)
- Website: audacy.com/kfrog

KFRG (95.1 FM) is a commercial radio station licensed to San Bernardino, California, and broadcasting to the Riverside-San Bernardino-Inland Empire radio market. KFRG airs a country music radio format calling itself "K-FROG" and is believed to be the original "Frog" station under previous owner Keymarket. The brand name has been subsequently licensed by Keymarket to dozens of American radio stations.

Owned by Audacy, Inc., its studios are on Spruce Street in Riverside and the transmitter site off Cloudland Truck Trail north of San Bernardino. KFRG broadcasts an HD Radio signal. Programming is also heard on KXFG Menifee at 92.9 MHz. It's also designed as a local primary of the Emergency Alert System for the Inland Empire

== History ==
=== Christian Radio and Soft AC ===
The station signed on on August 4, 1974, as KQLH. It had a Christian radio format and was owned by Channel Six Thirty Two, Inc. At first, its signal was limited, powered at 15,000 watts, less than a third of its current output.

In the early 1980s, KQLH was acquired by Keymarket Stations, which flipped the format to soft adult contemporary. It also carried news updates from the Mutual Broadcasting System. Due to strong competition from Los Angeles stations 103.5 KOST and 104.3 KBIG, also Soft AC stations, KQLH struggled in the ratings.

=== Country Music K-FROG ===
On December 25, 1989, Christmas Day, KQLH flipped to a country music format. The call letters were changed to KFRG to go along with its new nickname "K-FROG." Country music proved popular in the Inland Empire and K-FROG saw a big improvement in its ratings. In 1998, KFRG was acquired by the Infinity Broadcasting Corporation, which was later merged into CBS Radio.

On August 17, 2006, KFRG became the only country music station that could be heard in the Los Angeles area by default. LA's country station, KZLA, changed its programming format to rhythmic adult contemporary, leaving the nation's #2 market without a spot on the FM dial airing country music.

As a result of the void left by KZLA, KFRG briefly began showing up in the Los Angeles ratings. The station began focusing more on Orange County and Los Angeles area news and traffic. But on February 23, 2007, KKGO-FM 105.1 flipped from classical music to country, putting that format back on a full-powered Los Angeles FM station.

In 2009, KFRG and its simulcast stations joined the Motor Racing Network for coverage of NASCAR races, but left after the 2013 season.

On October 15, 2015, KFRG was named "Station of the Year" by the Inland Empire chapter of the American Advertising Federation.

=== Entercom and Audacy ===
On February 2, 2017, CBS Radio announced it would merge with Entercom. The merger was approved on November 9, 2017, and was consummated on the 17th.

In 2021, Entercom changed its name to Audacy, Inc. KFRG can be streamed on the Audacy app and website.

=== Simulcasts ===
KFRG is simulcast on KXFG 92.9 MHz in Menifee, which serves the Temecula area of Southern California. The station was previously heard on the HD-2 digital subchannel of co-owned 93.1 KCBS-FM Los Angeles.

Until February 16, 2010, KVFG (103.1 FM) in Victorville also carried KFRG's programming. It switched to a sports format that day, then to a classic hits format on December 26, 2011. KVFG has since been sold to El Dorado Broadcasters and in October 2019 it flipped to a Regional Mexican format, branded as "La X 103.1."
