= KCBS (AM) =

- San Francisco, California; United States
- Broadcast area: San Francisco Bay Area
- Frequency: 740 kHz
- Branding: All News 106.9 and AM 740 KCBS

Programming
- Format: All-news radio
- Affiliations: ABC News Radio; Bloomberg Radio; KPIX-TV

Ownership
- Owner: Audacy, Inc.; (Audacy License, LLC)
- Sister stations: KFRC-FM, KGMZ-FM, KITS, KLLC, KRBQ

History
- First air date: December 9, 1921; previous experimental operations took place from 1909 to 1921
- Former call signs: KQW (1921–1949)
- Call sign meaning: Columbia Broadcasting System, the former legal name of former owner CBS Corporation

Technical information
- Licensing authority: FCC
- Facility ID: 9637
- Class: B
- Power: 50,000 watts
- Transmitter coordinates: 38°8′22.7″N 122°31′48.9″W
- Repeater: 106.9 KFRC-FM (San Francisco)

Links
- Public license information: Public file; LMS
- Webcast: Listen live (via Audacy)
- Website: www.audacy.com/kcbsradio

Site of World's First Broadcasting Station
- Station FN
- Interactive map of Site of World's First Broadcasting Station
- Location: 37.33405°N 121.88945°W 50 W San Fernando St, San Jose CA

California Historical Landmark
- Designated: January 14, 1983
- Reference no.: 952

KCBS (740 kHz) is an all-news AM radio station located in San Francisco, California. It is owned by Audacy, Inc. (formerly Entercom), which took over after its merger with CBS Radio.

KCBS formerly shared its Battery Street studios with CBS owned-and-operated television station KPIX-TV 5. The transmitter site is located in Novato. Its programming is simulcast on co-owned 106.9 KFRC-FM plus that station's HD1 digital sub-channel. It is Northern California's primary entry point station for the Emergency Alert System.

KCBS operates with a transmitter output of 50,000 watts, and during the daytime can be regularly received as far north as Red Bluff and Hopland and south as far as San Luis Obispo. In good conditions it is also heard as far north as Redding and south to Santa Maria. At night, the station employs a directional antenna, primarily sending its signal to the southeast, in order to protect CFZM in Toronto, the dominant Class A station on the 740 kHz clear-channel frequency. Even with this restriction, KCBS's nighttime signal reaches a large slice of the Western United States with a good radio. This includes almost all of California, as far south as Los Angeles and San Diego. On rare occasions, "DXers" (hobbyists who listen for distant stations) have reported receiving KCBS across the Pacific Ocean, and in Hawaii and Alaska.

In addition to over-the-air broadcasts, KCBS audio is webcast with live streaming audio around the clock. The station's live stream is available through the Audacy app along with TuneIn and iHeartRadio as of 2025; in October 2019, it was one of the test stations for the Audacy (then known as Radio.com) app's new "Rewind" feature, where the last 24 hours of KCBS programming can be accessed on-demand.

== Programming ==
Like most of its sister Audacy all-news stations, KCBS airs hourly ABC News Radio reports. Additional features include traffic, weather, sports updates, and "Bloomberg Moneywatch" business reports. KPIX-TV meteorologists provide weather forecasts, especially during AM and PM drive times.

The station hosts special segments each weekday with San Francisco Chronicle columnist Phil Matier and others. KCBS will often feature live interviews with call-in guest experts (who occasionally also appear in the studio with the anchors) to briefly discuss a specific story, topic or subject; the edited comments are replayed as part of featured news stories throughout the remainder of the day.

Beginning in December 2025, KCBS programming is simulcast on sister all-news station KNX (AM) in Los Angeles. between midnight and 5 am. News, traffic, and weather reports during the overnight hours include both Bay Area and Los Angeles stories.

== History ==
=== Experimental years ===
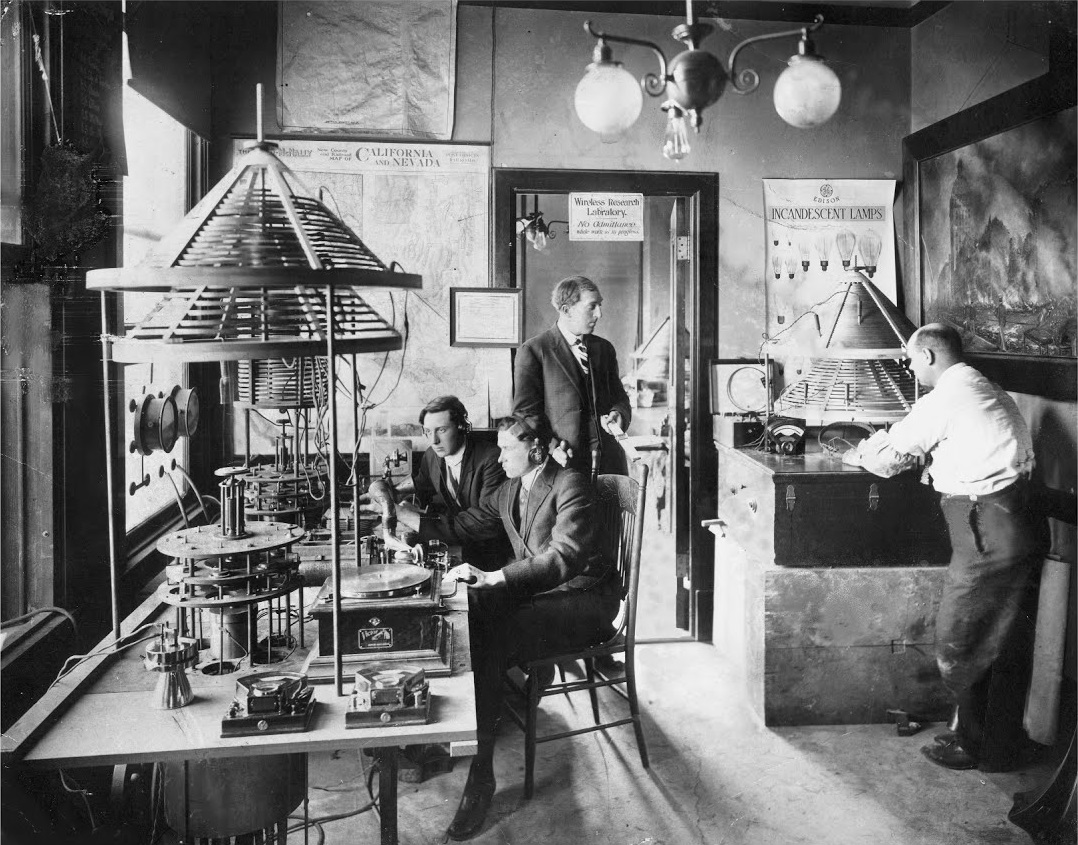
Charles Herrold's San Jose California radio laboratory, circa 1912. Herrold is standing in the doorway.

KCBS is considered to be among the world's first radio stations. It received its first broadcasting station license, as KQW in San Jose, in early December 1921. However, the original licensee, Charles Herrold, had begun making audio radio transmissions in 1909, as part of an experimental radio-telephone system, and KCBS has traditionally dated its founding to that year. Herrold's earliest radio work had been largely forgotten until 1959, when Gordon R. Greb's "The Golden Anniversary of Broadcasting" was published in the Journal of Broadcasting.

On January 1, 1909, Herrold opened the Herrold College of Wireless and Engineering, located in the Garden City Bank Building at 50 West San Fernando Street in San Jose. In order to promote the college, as well as provide practical experience for his students, a radio transmitter (then commonly known as "wireless telegraphy") with a large antenna was constructed atop the building. The earliest transmissions used spark-gap transmitters which could only transmit the dots-and-dashes of Morse code.

Herrold was among the first to develop a radio transmitter that could also be used for audio transmissions. After limited success with an approach that used "high-frequency" sparks, he later began using a version of an "arc-transmitter" originally developed by Valdemar Poulsen. Although his primary objective was to create a wireless telephone that could be commercialized for point-to-point use, beginning in July 1912 Herrold also began making regular weekly entertainment broadcasts, with the debut program featuring phonograph records supplied by the Wiley B. Allen company. A wire service report reviewed a July 22, 1912 broadcast:

San Jose, Cal., July 22.—A musical concert by means of wireless telephone was conducted in this city to-day by Prof. Charles D. Herrold, assisted by Wireless Telegraph Operator E. A. Portal. The music, which was supplied by a phonograph, was heard by a large number of amateur wireless telegraph operators within a radius of 100 miles of this city, who, by telegraph, signified their choice of musical selections to be transmitted. Anyone having the proper wireless telegraph ear receivers was able to catch the music, as well as the speech, and they pronounced it equal to anything heard over the customary wire telephones. The demonstration lasted two hours.

— Associated Press, "Musical Concert by Wireless Telephone", San Diego Union, July 23, 1912, page 19

Radio communication was initially unregulated in the United States, and at first Herrold used a variety of self-assigned identifiers for his station, including FN and SJN, plus, for audio transmissions, "San Jose calling". The Radio Act of 1912 established the licensing of stations through the U.S. Commerce Department, and in late 1915 Herrold was issued an Experimental Station License with the call sign 6XF. (Note: The "6" in 6XF's call sign indicated that the station was located in the 6th Radio Inspection district, while the "X" specified that the station held an Experimental License.) Although Herrold reported success in developing his system, his arc-transmitters were low-powered and would only work at wavelengths above 600 meters (frequencies below 500 kHz). The concurrent development of vacuum-tube technology, which did not have the same limitations, started making arc technology obsolete.

=== World War I ===
In April 1917, with the entrance of the United States into World War I, the U.S. government took control of the entire radio industry, and it became illegal for private citizens to possess a working radio receiver. In addition, all civilian radio stations were ordered to be dismantled, so for the duration of the conflict Herrold left the airwaves. This wartime government ban on civilian stations was lifted effective October 1, 1919, and in early 1921 Herrold was reissued an Experimental license, again with the call sign 6XF. (He had previously been issued a license for a portable transmitter, with the call sign 6XE.)

During the war impressive strides had been made in vacuum-tube transmitter and receiver design, and Herrold's arc-transmitters were no longer commercially competitive. In 1920 a number of radio stations in the San Francisco Bay area, employing vacuum-tube transmitters, began making regular entertainment broadcasts, most prominently the "California Theater" station, 6XC, set up by Lee de Forest, which began daily service around April 1920. After the war Herrold needed to become familiar with vacuum-tube equipment before he could return to the air. Although some of his co-workers later reported that he resumed regular broadcasts as early as 1919, the oldest documented report of his resumption of broadcasting, presumably over 6XF, dates to early May 1921, with the announcement that the school was inaugurating a Monday and Thursday night schedule consisting of records supplied by "J. A. Kerwin of 84 East Santa Clara street, dealer in phonographs".

=== KQW (1921–1949) ===
Effective December 1, 1921, the Department of Commerce issued a regulation that stations making broadcasts intended for the general public now had to hold a Limited Commercial license specifying operation on a wavelength of 360 or 485 meters, and, on December 9, 1921, a broadcasting station authorization with the randomly assigned call letters of KQW was issued in Herrold's name. This license specified operation on the common "entertainment" wavelength of 360 meters (833 kHz), so KQW initially broadcast only during the hours assigned to it under a time-sharing agreement made with the other local broadcasting stations.

Classifying stations according to when they first received a broadcasting authorization under the provisions of the December 1, 1921, regulations, KQW was tied for 6th in the state of California and 16th in the United States. It is the eighth oldest surviving radio station in the United States and tied for 2nd oldest in California, one day behind KWG in Stockton, and tied with KNX in Los Angeles. It is also the oldest in the Bay Area; the next-oldest, KMKY in Oakland, was licensed as KLS on March 10, 1922.

Operation of KQW was financed by the sale of radio equipment by the Herrold Radio Laboratory, but by 1925 the costs had grown. The station was transferred to the First Baptist Church of San Jose, with Herrold kept on as program director. In 1926, station manager Fred J. Hart bought KQW's license and facilities, eventually buying the station itself in 1930. From 1937 to 1941, KQW served as the San Jose network affiliate of the Don Lee Broadcasting System. During this time its owner was Julius Brunton & Sons, and the station's operations were co-located with KJBS at 1470 Pine Street in San Francisco. Until 1942, it operated as a service of the Pacific Agricultural Foundation to farmers in the Central Valley.

In 1927, the Federal Radio Commission (FRC) was created to take over the regulation of U.S. radio stations, and it began a series of frequency shifts to coordinate station assignments. Effective November 11, 1928, the FRC divided the AM band transmitting frequencies into three classification: Local, Regional, and Clear Channel. KQW's assignment, 1010 kHz, which it had been using since the previous year, was designated a regional frequency. By 1940, KQW had increased its daytime power to the maximum permitted for regional stations, 5,000 watts. In March 1941, under the provisions of the North American Regional Broadcasting Agreement (NARBA), most U.S. radio stations were shifted to new dial positions, so KQW moved to 740.

Under the NARBA provisions, 740 was a Canadian Clear channel, with CBL (740 AM) (since transferred to FM; the frequency now is utilized by CFZM using the same technical perimeters) as the frequency's Class I-A primary station. KQW was classified as a Class II secondary station. However, the great distance between the two stations meant that, with the use of a directional antenna, KQW could apply for permission to increase its power to 50,000 watts. In the early 1940s, the San Francisco Bay area affiliate for the CBS radio network was KSFO, which, because it operated on a regional frequency, was limited to a power of 5,000 watts. CBS wanted to have a station operating at a full 50,000 watts, and an agreement was initially made for KQW and KSFO to swap frequencies — KSFO to 740 and KQW to 560 — after which KSFO would upgrade to 50,000 watts. However, this plan fell through because CBS also wanted to own the Bay Area affiliate, and the owners of KSFO were not willing to sell. Due to this rebuff, in 1942 CBS transferred its affiliation from KSFO to KQW, with an option to eventually purchase KQW. (Note: KSFO's owner, Associated Broadcasters, had decided to concentrate on plans for its new television station, KPIX-TV. As compensation for allowing KQW to remain on 740, KPIX received the Bay Area's CBS television affiliation.) The station staff moved to a CBS-owned studio located at the Palace Hotel. For all intents and purposes, it was now a San Francisco station. However, it was still licensed to San Jose, so an announcer was posted at the transmitter site to provide the required "KQW, San Jose" legal IDs.

=== The beginning of KCBS (1949–1995) ===
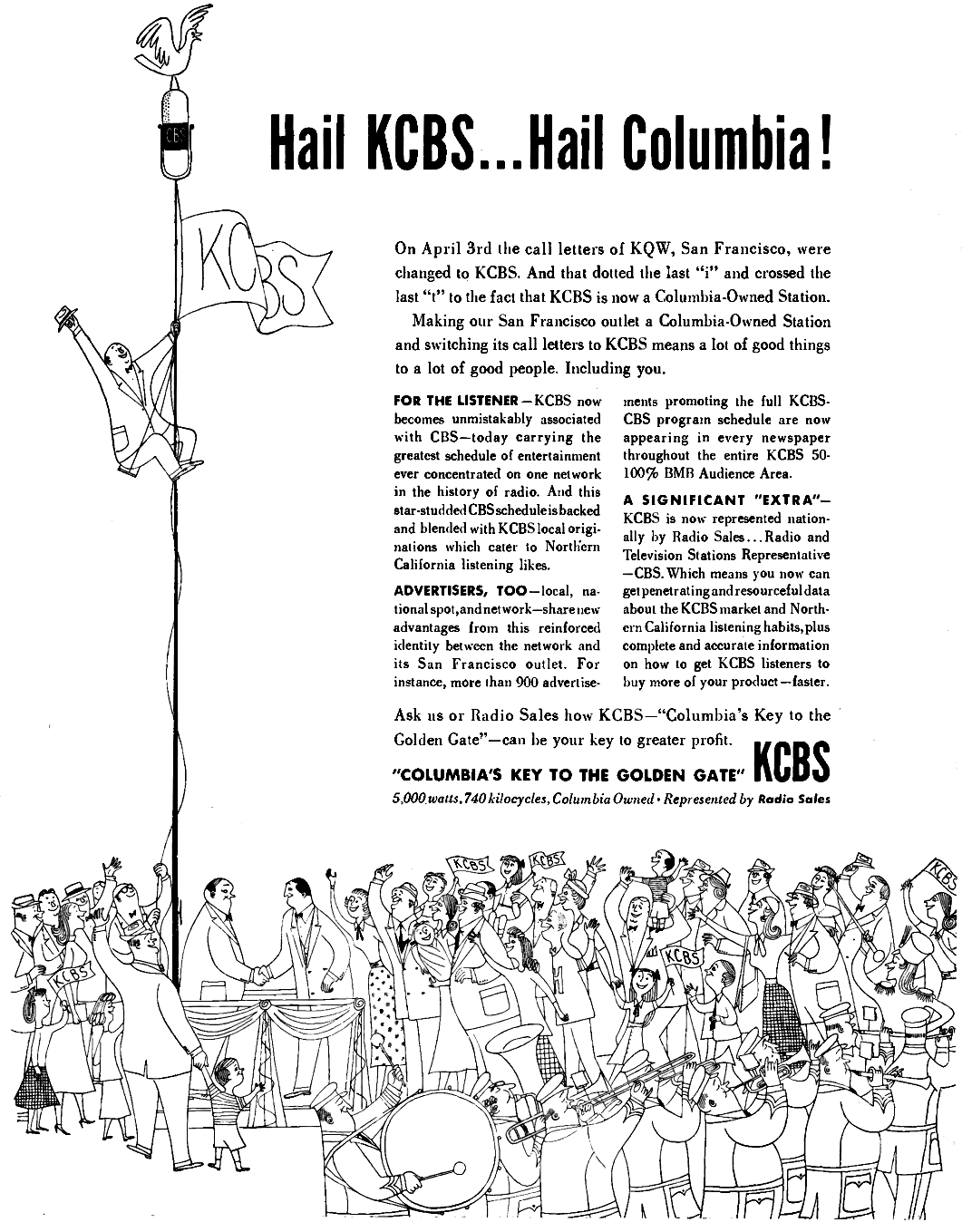
On April 3, 1949, the station call letters were changed from KQW to KCBS.

CBS exercised its option to buy KQW in 1949, changing the station's call letters to KCBS. (Note: This use of the KCBS callsign predates its use in Los Angeles by KCBS-TV (formerly KTSL and KNXT) and KCBS-FM by more than 30 years.) In 1951, KCBS signed on for the first time from the four-tower 50,000-watt facility at Novato that had originally been intended for KSFO. KCBS's city of license was also officially changed from San Jose to San Francisco, though for all intents and purposes it had been a San Francisco station for some time before then. KCBS was part of the plot in episode 633 of the radio program Yours Truly Johnny Dollar, entitled "The Frisco Fire Matter", which aired 04/05/1959. Yours Truly, Johnny Dollar is a radio drama that aired on CBS Radio from February 18, 1949 to September 30, 1962.

In 1968, KCBS became one of the first all-news stations in the country, as CBS was converting many of its radio stations nationwide to the format, developed at WCBS in New York City. KCBS already had a long history in news dating back to World War II, when it was the center of CBS' newsgathering efforts in the Pacific Theater. In 1971, KCBS moved its studios to the 32nd floor of One Embarcadero Center. Notable anchors and reporters who became popular during the early "Newsradio" era included Al Hart, Frank Knight, Dave McElhatton (whose KCBS tenure dated to the early 1950s, including hosting a popular morning show on the station before the all-news format was implemented; McElhatton moved to KPIX-TV in 1977, where he was a highly popular and trusted lead anchorman until his retirement in 2000), Ray Hutchinson (KCBS' first business anchor under the all-news format, delivering his updates from the floor of the Pacific Stock Exchange), Ken Ackerman (who began on the station in 1942, later hosting KCBS' version of Music 'Til Dawn and eventually becoming a news anchor under the all-news format, serving until his retirement in 1995), Bob Price, a longtime business anchor and editor for KCBS who worked for over 20 years at the radio station, anchored from the Pacific Stock Exchange until his retirement on November 5, 2009.

Throughout its early history, KCBS also broadcast local sports. As early as 1949, KCBS broadcast Stanford University football games. Upon converting to its all-news format in 1968, KCBS stopped broadcasting Stanford sports, whose broadcasts moved to rival KSFO. In 1985, KCBS signed a three-year contract to broadcast Stanford football and men's basketball. In 1992, Stanford dropped KCBS in favor of KFRC-AM in 1992 in order to find a station that would devote more airtime to discuss Stanford sports than KCBS could with its all-news format. From 1980 to 1986, KCBS broadcast San Jose State football. However, KCBS carried most San Jose State games on tape delay in the 1986 season due to conflicts with Stanford games. KCBS did not renew its contract with San Jose State after it expired, and San Jose station KHTT won San Jose State broadcast rights beginning in 1987. From 1981 to 1986, KCBS was the flagship station for the San Francisco 49ers. In 1990, KCBS became the primary station for the Bay Area's Emergency Broadcast System after KNBR, the former primary EBS station, failed to activate the Emergency Broadcast System due to major technical malfunctions caused by the engineering department at KNBR during and the aftermath of the 1989 Loma Prieta earthquake. The Federal Communications Commission called the situation "revoked" as the decision was made to move its primary EBS status to KCBS after the major fail on KNBR.

=== Common ownership with KPIX (1995–2017) ===
KCBS logo from the late 1990s to 2005.

In late November 1995, the Westinghouse Electric Corporation bought CBS, bringing the Bay Area's oldest radio station under common ownership with its oldest television station, KPIX-TV Channel 5, which Westinghouse had purchased from Associated Broadcasters in 1954. In May 2006, KCBS and KPIX-TV moved their news bureau in San Jose to the Fairmont Tower at 50 West San Fernando Street. This was, coincidentally, the location of Charles Herrold's original broadcasts. CBS management was unaware of the San Fernando Street address' history when the move was planned. However, once informed that this was the birthplace of KCBS, they recognized this at the bureau's opening celebration.

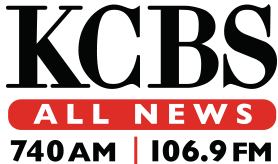
Final logo under CBS Radio ownership used from 2011 to 2018 with CBS's Didot typeface; variants of this logo have been used since 2005.

In mid-March 2005, KCBS, along with nearly all of the other all-news stations owned by Infinity Broadcasting (which renamed itself CBS Radio that fall), began streaming its audio over its website, reversing a long-standing Infinity Radio policy of not doing so. (New York City's WCBS began streaming its programming online the previous December). Local commercials which are heard on the radio signal are replaced on the internet stream for nationally and regionally sponsored ads, a few public service announcements, station promos, promos of CBS Television shows, and repeats of pre-recorded feature segments already on the broadcast schedule (including StarDate and Science Today, produced by the University of California). In March 2010, KCBS and the other CBS Radio stations blocked Internet listeners outside the United States from accessing its live stream.

In 2007, KCBS added an HD Radio digital sub-channel, and began identifying as "KCBS and KCBS-HD". On October 27, 2008, the station began simulcasting its full schedule over co-owned KFRC-FM (106.9) and that station's HD1 digital sub-channel. (KFRC-FM's previous "classic hits" format was moved to 106.9 HD2.) The stations' microphone flag now displays "740" on two sides of the cube, and "106.9" on the other two. In 2011 the stations adopted the joint branding of "All News 106.9 and AM 740, KCBS". KFRC-FM did not change its call letters because the KCBS-FM call sign was already in use by a CBS owned station in Los Angeles on 93.1 FM. Additionally, CBS wanted to keep another Bay Area station from trading on the KFRC calls' legacy in the area.

=== Sale to Entercom ===
On February 2, 2017, CBS Radio announced it would merge with Entercom. While CBS shareholders retained a 72% ownership stake in the combined company, Entercom was the surviving entity, separating KCBS radio from KPIX. The merger was approved on November 9, 2017, and was consummated on November 17. As part of the agreement with CBS, Entercom was given the rights to use the brand and trademarks for KCBS (along with sister stations KCBS-FM in Los Angeles, and WCBS-FM in New York City) for a 20-year period, after which Entercom (or succeeding entity) will be required to relinquish these call signs. On March 30, 2021, Entercom changed its name to Audacy.

On May 21, 2026 at 3 p.m., KCBS transitioned to airing top-of-hour national news updates from ABC News Radio — ahead of CBS News Radio’s dissolution the following day. A move mirroring most other Audacy all-news and news-talk stations, the switch to ABC News Radio marks the end of one of KCBS’ last-remaining, nearly century-long links with CBS News and CBS — its original parent company.

== Pioneer station status ==
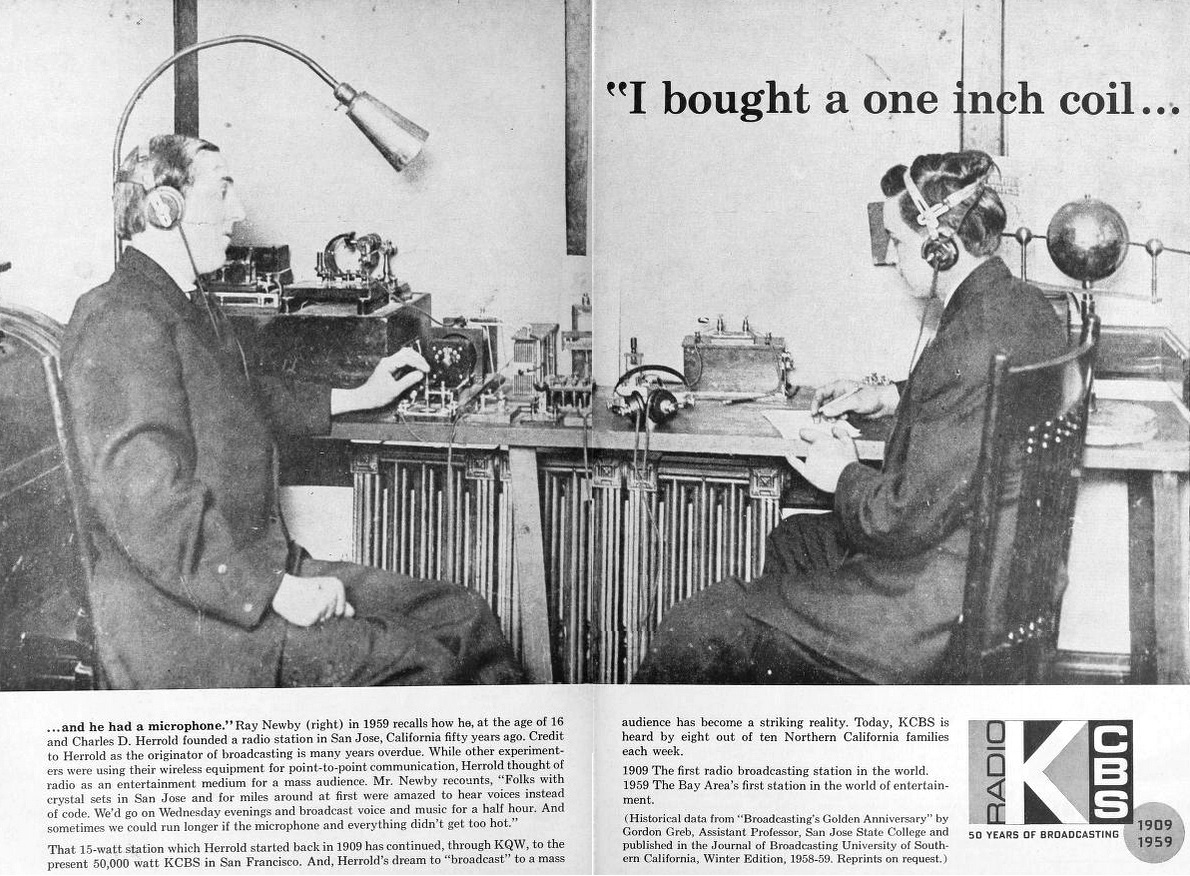
1959 advertisement for KCBS promoting the station's 50th anniversary and claiming the title of "the first radio broadcasting station in the world". Pictured are Charles D. Herrold and his assistant Ray Newby, circa 1910.

One of the conditions of Herrold's sale of KQW in 1925 was that the new owners include, in the sign-on announcement, the following: "This is KQW, pioneer broadcasting station of the world, founded by Dr. Charles D. Herrold in San Jose in 1909".

Although there are reports that Herrold was making experimental audio transmissions as early as 1909, the best evidence is that it wasn't until July 1912 when he began making regularly scheduled broadcasts. These weekly programs are generally accepted as being the first regular entertainment broadcasts made by radio. More contentious is whether KCBS can be considered the oldest radio station in continuous service, due to the fact that, following the end of World War I, Herrold did not resume regular broadcasting until May 1921. (Other candidates for oldest U.S. radio station include 8MK / WWJ in Detroit, which began regular broadcasts in August 1920; WOC in Davenport, Iowa, which traces its origin to station 9BY, beginning regular broadcasts around September 1920; 9ZAF/KLZ in Denver, with nightly concerts beginning in October 1920; and 8ZZ/KDKA in Pittsburgh, which began operating on November 2, 1920.)

In 1945, stations WWJ and KDKA held competing 25th anniversary celebrations, both claiming to be the oldest "commercial radio station". Later that same year, KQW prepared and broadcast "The Story of KQW". The program made the claim that KCBS is the oldest radio station, predating by eleven years both WWJ and KDKA. This broadcast included a brief recorded statement by Herrold, made just before his 70th birthday. All three of these stations, WWJ, KDKA and KCBS, eventually came under the common ownership of CBS Radio and remain sister stations under the ownership of Audacy.

== Landmark status ==
A commemorative plaque designating 50 Fairmont Plaza, San Jose, California as the site of the "World's First Broadcasting Station" was established on January 14, 1983, as California Historical Landmark 952. The plaque was placed by the California State Parks in cooperation with the California Pioneers of Santa Clara County and Mountain Charlie Chapter No. 1850, E Clampus Vitus, on April 3, 1984. The inscription on the marker reads:

On this corner stood the Garden City Bank Building, where Charles D. Herrold established Station FN, the first radio broadcasting station in the world. As a pioneer in wireless telephony (radio), Herrold established the first station in 1909 to transmit radio programs of music and news to a listening audience on a regular basis.

In 2009, KCBS celebrated its 100th birthday, with a yearlong series of events throughout the Bay Area. Included was the public dedication of a plaque commemorating the "Centennial Celebration of the World's First Broadcasting Station". This plaque is located outside the lobby at 50 Fairmont Plaza in San Jose, where Herrold's original broadcasts took place. During the year, KCBS adopted the slogan "The World's First Broadcasting Station".

== See also ==
- List of initial AM-band station grants in the United States
