= KDUC =

Radio station in Barstow, California, United States

- Barstow, California; United States
- Broadcast area: Barstow–Victorville, California
- Frequency: 94.3 MHz
- Branding: 94-3 & 102-5 The Duck

Programming
- Format: Contemporary hit radio

Ownership
- Owner: California Communications of Barstow, LLC; (Dos Costas Communications Corporation)
- Sister stations: KDUQ; KSZL; KXXZ

History
- First air date: June 4, 1986; 39 years ago
- Call sign meaning: Duck

Technical information
- Licensing authority: FCC
- Facility ID: 21495
- Class: B1
- ERP: 4,600 watts
- HAAT: 239 meters (784 ft)
- Transmitter coordinates: 34°58′15″N 117°02′22″W
- Repeater: See § Repeater

Links
- Public license information: Public file; LMS
- Webcast: Listen live
- Website: theduckradio.net

KDUC (94.3 FM) is a commercial radio station that is licensed to Barstow, California and serves the Barstow and Victor Valley areas, as well as along Interstate 15 to Baker, California. The station is simulcast on KDUQ (102.5 FM), which is licensed to Ludlow, California and broadcasts along Interstate 40 east of Barstow. Both stations are owned by California Communications of Barstow, LLC and broadcast a contemporary hit radio music format branded as "The Duck".

== History ==
KDUC first signed on June 4, 1986, in Barstow, California. Owned by First American Communications Corporation, the station broadcast a contemporary hit radio (CHR) format. On July 7, 1995, First American launched KDUQ, a repeater of KDUC that transmitted from Ludlow, California to extend coverage along Interstate 40 across the Mojave Desert east of Barstow. At the time, both stations carried a hot adult contemporary music format. In December 1998, First American sold KDUC, KDUQ, and AM sister station KSZL to Pleasant Gap, Pennsylvania-based Tele-Media Broadcasting LLC for $875,000.

In June 2008, Dos Costas Communications Corporation sold the rhythmic contemporary-formatted KDUC and KDUQ, as well as KSZL and KXXZ, to California Communications of Barstow, LLC for $4.3 million.

== Repeater ==
Call sign	Frequency	City of license	Facility ID	Class	ERP (W)	Height (m (ft))	Transmitter coordinates	First air date	Call sign meaning
KDUQ	102.5 FM	Ludlow, California	21497	A	6,000	−50 m (−160 ft)	34°43′21″N 116°10′04″W	July 7, 1995; 30 years ago	Duck
