= KPRO (California) =

Radio station in Riverside, California, 1957–2018

- Riverside, California; United States
- Broadcast area: Inland Empire
- Frequency: 1570 kHz

Ownership
- Owner: Impact Radio, Inc.

History
- First air date: June 22, 1957
- Last air date: August 3, 2018
- Former call signs: KACE (1957–1976); KHNY (1976–1978); KMAY (1978–1986)

Technical information
- Facility ID: 50281
- Class: B
- Power: 5,000 watts (day); 194 watts (night)
- Transmitter coordinates: 33°55′54.1″N 117°23′50.2″W

KPRO (1570 AM) was a radio station licensed to Riverside, California, United States, that operated from 1957 to 2018. Last owned by Impact Radio, Inc., it carried a Christian radio station at the time of closure.

== History ==
The station went on the air June 22, 1957. Ray and Helen Lapica, with Ollie Sherban, owned KACE, which changed its name to KHNY in 1976 and KMAY in 1978. They were followed as owners by Ronnie Olenick and Larry Lapica.

In 1986, Olenick and Lapica (under the name Riverside County Broadcasting) took over the KPRO call sign, which had been abandoned by 1440 AM, and moved it the former KMAY.

After 1986, KPRO specialized in religious programming. In 1990 it was said that KPRO was "Established in 1941" (Note: The previous KPRO on 1440 went on the air November 15, 1941.) and billed itself as "inspirational radio", with live gospel on Sundays. Jeff Duran, hosted the Local Rock Scene in 1997. Still in high school, Duran interviewed and played up coming bands like Blink 182, No Doubt, Papa Roach and AFI who would eventually go on to become multi platinum artists.

In later years, KPRO was owned by Impact Radio, Inc., and featured programming from Westwood One; it was still owned by Olenick and Lapica. The station went off the air on August 3, 2018. It was said to be "a victim of declining AM radio listenership and vastly increasing value of property in Southern California". The property was sold to a land developer. The Federal Communications Commission cancelled KPRO's license on November 5, 2019, due to it having been silent for more than twelve months.
