= Kerry (name) =

- Pronunciation: keh-ree
- Language: Irish

Origin
- Region of origin: Ireland

Kerry
- Pronunciation: /ˈkɛri/
- Gender: Unisex

Origin
- Origin: Irish Gaelic
- Meaning: "Kingdom of Ciar", "dark-haired"
- Region of origin: Ireland

Other names
- Related names: Keri, Kerri, Kerrie, Keira, Kira, Kiria, Keir, Kier, Kiera

Kerry or Kerri is a unisex English language given name of Gaelic (Irish) origin.

In its original form Ciarraighe (Ciarraí), it denoted the kingdom of Ciar (ciar raighe), Ciar being the son of Fergus mac Róich, who gave his name to County Kerry. Ciarraighe was thus the name of the pre-Gaelic tribe who lived in the area of what is now County Kerry. However, branches of the Ciarraighe were all over Ireland:

- Ciarraige Luachra—in what is now north County Kerry and Sliabh Luachra, both named after them.
- Ciarraige Cuirche—due south of what is now Cork City, in Munster.
- Ciarraige Áei—on the plains of central County Roscommon, in Connacht.
- Ciarraighe Locha na nÁirne—in eastern County Mayo in Connacht.
- Ciarraige Airtech—on Magh nAirtig (plain of Airtig, northwest County Roscommon, parish of Tibohine).
- Ciarraige Broengair—location uncertain. The Múscraige Breogain were found south-west of Cashel, Munster.
- Ciarraige Choinnend—location uncertain.
- Ciarraige Trimaige—location uncertain.
- Ciarraige Aidhne—in Aidhne, now south County Galway, Connacht.

== Notable people with the name ==
=== Acting, presenting, and radio ===
- Kerry Bishé, actress
- Kerry Fox (born 1966), New Zealand actress
- Kerry Godliman (born 1973), English actress and comedian
- Kerri Green, American actress
- Kerri Kasem, an American radio and television host
- Kerri Kendall, an American model and actress
- Kerri-Anne Kennerley, an Australian television presenter
- Kerri Kenney-Silver, an American comedian, actress, singer and writer
- Kerry LaiFatt, Canadian actress
- Kerry Rossall, American stuntman and actor
- Kerry Shale, Canadian actor, voice artist and writer
- Kerry Washington, American actress

=== Politics ===
- Kerry J. Donley (1956-2022), American politician
- Kerry Healey (born 1960), American politician, former Lieutenant Governor of Massachusetts
- Kerri Irvin-Ross, Canadian politician
- Kerry Pourciau (1951–1994), American city official
- Kerry Underwood, member of the Alabama House of Representatives

=== Music ===
- Kerry Alexander, lead singer of the Minnesota-based band Bad Bad Hats
- Kerri Chandler, producer of house music
- Kerry Ellis, an English singer and stage actress
- Kerry Katona, pop singer
- Kerry King, guitarist for thrash metal band Slayer
- Kerry Livgren, a founding member of the progressive rock band Kansas
- Kerry Marx, American guitarist and Music Director of the Grand Ole Opry
- Kerry McGregor (1974–2012), Scottish singer-songwriter and actress

=== Sport ===
- Kerry Blackshear Jr. (born 1997), American basketball player
- Kerry Brown (wrestler), Canadian professional wrestler
- Kerri Buchberger, Canadian volleyball player
- Kerry Carpenter, American baseball player
- Kerry Collins, American football player
- Kerry Dixon, English soccer player
- Kerri Gallagher (born 1989), American middle-distance runner
- Kerry Joyce, South African gymnast, All-Africa champion
- Kerry Kittles, American basketball player
- Kerry Ligtenberg, American baseball player
- Kerry O'Brien (athlete), Australian middle-distance runner
- Kerri Pottharst, Australian beach volleyball player
- Kerry Reid, Australian tennis player
- Kerri Strug, American gymnast
- Kerry Von Erich, American professional wrestler
- Kerri Walsh, American beach volleyball player
- Kerry Wood, American baseball player

=== Other fields ===
- Kerry Gammill, American comic book artist
- Kerri Greenidge, American historian and academic
- Kerri Hoskins, former glamour model
- Kerrie Hughes, New Zealand fashion designer
- Kerry G. Johnson, graphic designer, caricature artist
- Kerry Joyce, American interior designer and product designer
- Kerry McCluggage, owner and president of Craftsman Films
- Kerry Mitchell, American artist
- Kerry Packer, Australian media magnate
- Kerri Rawson, American activist and author
- Kerri Sakamoto, Canadian novelist

== Surname ==
- Alexandra Kerry, (born 1973), American filmmaker
- Brett Kerry (born 1999), American baseball player
- Cameron Kerry, born 1950), son of Richard John Kerry, American politician
- Charles Kerry, (1857–1928), photographer
- John Kerry, (born 1943), United States politician and former secretary of state, son of Richard John Kerry
- Matilda Kerry, Nigerian physician
- Richard John Kerry, (1915 –2000), American Foreign Service officer and lawyer
- Rosemary Forbes Kerry, one of 11 children of James Grant Forbes of the Forbes family, wife of Richard John Kerry
- Vanessa Kerry, (born 1976), American physician and health care administrator

== See also ==
Carey (surname)
