= American Top 20 =

Radio program

- Genre: Music chart show
- Running time: 3 hrs (including commercials); 2 hrs. + 15 min. (w/out commercials)
- Country of origin: United States
- Syndicates: Premiere Networks
- Hosted by: Casey Kasem
- Announcer: Joe Cipriano; Ed McMann; Mike Kasem
- Created by: Casey Kasem; Don Bustany
- Produced by: Lorre Crimi
- Original release: March 28, 1998 – July 4, 2009

American Top 20 was the name given to two weekly spinoffs of the music countdown program American Top 40. They were both hosted by Casey Kasem for Premiere Networks (originally AMFM Radio Networks) and premiered on the weekend of March 28, 1998, the same weekend Kasem returned to host American Top 40.

In contrast with its parent series, which catered to popular music stations, American Top 20 provided the same service to adult contemporary stations. One of the weekly countdowns was produced for hot adult contemporary stations, while the other was produced for mainstream adult contemporary stations. The latter of the two series would see its survey cut in half starting with the week ending on March 20, 2004, becoming known as American Top 10.

== Beginnings ==
Both versions of American Top 20 had their roots in two other countdowns done by Kasem during his time with the Westwood One Radio Network. In 1992, Westwood One decided to launch a new adult contemporary countdown using the airplay survey data compiled by Radio & Records, the music trade newspaper that at the time was a subsidiary of the company and was already providing information to Kasem for his weekly pop countdown show at the time, Casey's Top 40. The AC program was titled Casey's Countdown and launched on March 7, 1992 as a three-hour program featuring the twenty-five biggest hits of the week.

In April 1994, Radio & Records added a hot adult contemporary survey to its tracking dossier and Westwood One launched another weekly countdown on November 5. This program was titled Casey's Hot 20 and was structured in a similar manner to Casey's Countdown, which saw its survey cut to the top twenty songs of the week around the same time.

== Background ==
Kasem brought his countdown shows to what was then known as AMFM Radio Networks after a contentious battle with Westwood One over his contract status. Just before he had left, Kasem had reacquired the rights to the American Top 40 name and branding from ABC Radio, which he signed over to his new employer.

== Source material ==
Continuing the practice that all of Kasem's countdowns had utilized since 1992, both editions of American Top 20 used the weekly mainstream and hot adult contemporary radio airplay surveys compiled by the trade paper Radio & Records. The survey later was conducted through Mediabase 24/7 and published in R&R, save for a brief period in 2000 and 2001 when the results were unpublished. After R&R folded, Mediabase began publishing the weekly survey in USA Today.

== Show format ==
Each countdown was three hours in length. A brief rundown of the format appears below.

- Songs That Topped The Chart Last Week: Kasem's standard practice of recounting the top three songs from the week before.
- Chart Extras: To fill out the three hours, past chart hits from the 1970s onward would be played at various intervals. The ones dubbed Extras would have a story behind them, as Kasem was known to do.
- Long Distance Dedications: Kasem's signature segment where listeners wrote in or emailed their song requests. The segment became exclusive to AT20 and AT10 following Kasem's departure from AT40, but became less and less of a focal point as the series progressed. Initially, one Long Distance Dedication would be featured per hour, but by 2006, only one would be featured over the course of the countdown.
- Book of Records and Whatever Happened To...?: two former original AT40 segments later added to the format of both shows in 2005.
- Droppers, Biggest Movers, and Longest Charting Song: as on his other countdowns, these were three groups of songs Kasem paid particular attention to in any given week. For any song that debuted, Kasem named the song that fell out of the survey. If there was a song that had made a significant move up the chart from the previous survey, Kasem would also make mention of it. For the longest charting song, Kasem would note how long it had been since the song debuted on the survey.

Each countdown initially finished with the top two songs of the week as the final segment. When the mainstream AC edition of AT20 became AT10, the show's final segment featured the final "AT10 Spotlight" song before the song atop the chart was revealed.

== America's Top Hits ==
Every week, Kasem would record five sponsored interstitial segments for affiliates with a chart topper from the past and a story behind it. This was a continuation of a practice he began when he was hosting Casey's Top 40 for Westwood One and each segment was intended to air once per day during the week to come. The AC and Hot AC editions of the program each had a separate set of songs, as did American Top 40 until Kasem stepped down from that show in early 2004.

== Changes made to mainstream AC show ==
When the mainstream AC edition of American Top 20 became American Top 10, a third special feature was added. This was known as the "AT10 Spotlight" and several songs with an overarching theme were played. For instance, the first edition of the show following its reformatting was "Band Members Gone Solo", featuring hits from former members of popular bands. The Spotlight feature would pop up several times during each show, with the last Spotlight song immediately preceding the number one song of the week.

In 2005, New York AC station WLTW added AT10 to its weekend schedule. In a move done strictly for the station, Premiere Networks distributed a heavily edited version of the show that removed the Extras and Spotlight, which reduced the show's length to one hour.

== Special programming ==
=== Year-end countdowns ===
Just as he had done on his pop countdown shows, Kasem presided over a countdown of the biggest hits of the year for his adult contemporary audiences. Two countdowns per year aired. Initially, both shows ended the year with a two part, two week Top 60. Beginning in 2002, the Mainstream AC year end specials were cut to a one week Top 30, but the Hot AC shows continued with the Top 60, and continued to do so until January 2009. The lone exception was 1999; an additional thirty-song countdown of the biggest Hot AC and Mainstream AC hits of the previous decade were added and both end of year countdowns were thirty songs in length.

The songs that finished at #1 on the Hot AC charts were as follows.

- 1998: "Torn", Natalie Imbruglia
- 1999: "Slide", Goo Goo Dolls
- 2000: "Everything You Want", Vertical Horizon
- 2001: "If You're Gone", Matchbox Twenty
- 2002: "Wherever You Will Go", The Calling
- 2003: "Unwell", Matchbox Twenty
- 2004: "This Love", Maroon 5
- 2005: "Boulevard of Broken Dreams", Green Day
- 2006: "Over My Head", The Fray
- 2007: "It's Not Over", Daughtry
- 2008: "Love Song", Sara Bareilles

On the mainstream AC chart, these were the songs that finished as the #1 songs of the year.

- 1998: "Truly Madly Deeply", Savage Garden
- 1999: "You'll Be in My Heart", Phil Collins
- 2000: "I Knew I Loved You", Savage Garden
- 2001: "I Hope You Dance", Lee Ann Womack
- 2002: "Hero", Enrique Iglesias
- 2003: "The Game of Love", Santana featuring Michelle Branch
- 2004: "The First Cut Is the Deepest", Sheryl Crow
- 2005: "Breakaway", Kelly Clarkson
- 2006: "You're Beautiful", James Blunt
- 2007: "Waiting on the World to Change", John Mayer
- 2008: "Bubbly", Colbie Caillat

=== Holiday programming ===
In 2004, many of the stations airing American Top 10 were doing a programming stunt during the latter portion of the annual holiday season. Instead of mixing in songs from the holiday seasons of the past with their normal playlist, they would switch to an all-holiday format from Thanksgiving to Christmas. The producers of the show picked up on this and beginning that year, AT10 would devote the last six programs of the year prior to Christmas to the music of the season. The last two weeks would consist of a two-week, sixty song countdown of the best Christmas songs of all time that would conclude around the week of Christmas. The regular weekly countdown would be put on hold until January, with the special Christmas countdown followed by the year end top 30.

== Later years ==
Kasem continued to host American Top 40 concurrently with both AT20 series until the weekend of January 3, 2004. After that, he ceded the hosting position to Ryan Seacrest and signed a new contract to continue hosting both of the adult contemporary countdowns.

In 2004, Premiere Networks launched a version of AT40 for the same hot adult contemporary stations that AT20 had been targeting. Although such a move made AT20 redundant, Premiere continued to offer Hot AC countdowns hosted by both Casey Kasem (AT20) and Ryan Seacrest (AT40) from December 2004 thru July 2009.

== Show personnel ==
Most of the staff of AT20 also worked with Kasem at Westwood One and worked on all three of Kasem's countdowns. Lorre Crimi, who worked with Kasem during the final two years of his tenure at Westwood One, continued in her role as producer and was assisted by original AT40 staffers Matt Wilson, who returned to working with Kasem in 1998, and Merrill Shindler, who stayed with Kasem through his days at Westwood One as well. These three were eventually joined on a permanent basis by Toby James Petty. Other assistants to Crimi included Westwood One holdover Bill Strohm, Kasem's daughter Kerri, and Bobbi Kaminski. Westwood One holdovers Michael Cooper, Sal Cocio, and Ray Hernandez served as the primary production engineers and were assisted by various others over the course of the eleven year run of the countdowns.

From 1998 until 2001, Joe Cipriano provided the opening and closing announcements for each countdown. Ed McMann and Mike Kasem later held the role.

=== Substitute hosts ===
From time to time Kasem would need to take time off from the countdown for various reasons and would require a substitute host. The first sub host for AT20 was David Perry, who had filled that role for Kasem from 1993 until he left his position at Westwood One in 1998. Over the years, the most frequently used substitute was Ed McMann, who presided over forty editions of the countdown in Kasem's absence and also served as the shows' announcer for several years. For the final two years of the program, Kasem's son Mike was the designated substitute, with ten appearances beginning in late 2007.

Ryan Seacrest, Kasem's successor on AT40, would substitute a total of three times in 2003 as he prepared to take over control of the primary countdown. Other substitutes consisted of Steve Streit, the current CEO of Green Dot Corporation; former Access Hollywood co-anchor Pat O'Brien; voiceover artist Joe Cipriano; musician John Ondrasik, who performs as Five for Fighting; and Kasem's former colleague Charlie Tuna, who was the announcer for Kasem's former television program America's Top 10.

== The end ==
By 2009, Kasem was continuing to record two weekly countdown programs. He was doing so despite the effects of what his doctors had originally thought was Parkinson's disease when he was diagnosed in 2007 (the diagnosis was later corrected to Lewy body dementia).

On June 4, 2009, Premiere Radio Networks informed the affiliates carrying Kasem's two countdowns that new episodes would not be produced following the Fourth of July weekend. Kasem explained further in a press release later that he was retiring, saying that he still had things he wanted to accomplish while he had time to do so.

Both shows opened with Kasem noting that his first countdown aired during July 4 weekend, then informing the audience that they would be hearing his countdown for the final time after 39 years. Both shows featured one final Long Distance Dedication from Adam, a longtime fan from Massachusetts thanking Kasem for all he had done over the years and requesting Andrew Gold's "Thank You for Being a Friend" as his song:

Dear Casey,

When the news recently broke that your shows would be ending, I along with many others were quite upset! After all, a lot of us have been listening to you count down the hits for many years now. However, I know there's a time when people have to move on.

Casey, you've touched a great number of people through your shows, and you should be very proud of the impact you've had on our society. The radio waves just won't be the same without you. I know that I speak for every one of your fans out there when I say that we will miss you greatly, and we appreciate everything you've done for us over all these years.

So could you please play "Thank You for Being a Friend"? I know it's a song whose lyrics ring true with all your fans, young and old.

Thank you for being our friend, Casey; we'll miss you so much!

Adam

The final Spotlight feature on AT10 focused on artists with some of the top ten hits of the era.

When the countdown on both shows reached its end, instead of telling a story about something connected with the song or the artist behind it, Kasem instead chose to use that time to offer a brief monologue on his thirty-nine year career in counting down the hits. It went as follows.

Well now, we're up to the number one song in the land, and our look back at 4 amazing decades counting them down. The countdown began on the Fourth of July, 1970. It was an idea that my partner, Don Bustany, and I came up with; our first show took more than 18 hours to record! And at first, we only had 7 stations, but Don and I believed, and so did a growing number of listeners.

Back then, there were no Long Distance Dedications on the show; that didn't come along until 1978, when Matt Wilson located one in the mail, and Matt's been with us ever since. To date, we've read more than 3,000 of your dedications. Over the years, musical trends have come and gone: from disco to New Wave, from punk to hip hop, from bubblegum to rock, we've been there counting them down.

It's been a great 39 years. And, it's really been an honor for me. But, we're not finished yet; our first number 1 back in 1970 was "Mama Told Me Not to Come", by Three Dog Night. And we've got one more song to go!

With that, the trademark drumroll prior to the reveal of the number one song played one last time followed by the reveal by Kasem. "Second Chance" by Shinedown and "Love Story" by Taylor Swift were the final two chart toppers that week, with "Second Chance" spending a third consecutive week atop the AT20 chart and "Love Story" spending a fifth consecutive week atop the AT10 chart.

Just before signing off for the final time, Kasem offered the following to his audience:

I'd like to share with you something I've learned over the years. Success doesn't happen in a vacuum. You're only as good as the people you work with, and the people you work for. I've been lucky; I've worked for and with the very best!

—

The show then closed with Kasem reading the closing credits and then signing off for the last time, saying:

I'm Casey Kasem. Now, one more time, the words I've ended my show with since 1970: Keep your feet on the ground, and keep reaching for the stars!
