= Ciarraige Óic Bethra =

The Ciarraige Óic Bethra were a population-group found in early medieval Ireland.

== Origins ==
The word Ciarraige means the people of Ciar, and denoted descent from Ciar, son of Fergus mac Róich. The Ciarraige Óic Bethra were located in the kingdom of Aidhne, in what is now south County Galway.

According to Ó Muraíle, "they are said to have been one of three peoples (the others being the Tratraige and the Cóenraige) who were settled in Aidhne before the advent of the Uí Fiachrach Aidhne. An alternative version omits any mention of the Ciarraige, referring simply to Óic, and Óca, Bethra, and states that they came from Crích Ella - apparently the territory of Duhallow in north Cork."

In a note on the same page, he writes "The forms of the name combining Ciarraige with Óic Bethra are rather problematical; instead of Ciarraidi Oic Beatha ... and Ciarraighe Óga Beathra ... one might expect Ciarraige Óc mBethra", citing versions that appear in O Raghaillaigh's Genealogical Tracts (p. 137) and John O'Donovan's edition of Hy-Fiachrach.

They were not the only Ciarraige located in Connacht. The Ciarraige Áei, Ciarraige Locha na nÁirne and the Ciarraige Airtech once formed a large over-kingdom in central Connacht prior to the emergence of the Uí Briuin in the 8th and 9th centuries.

== See also ==
- Ciarraige Luachra - located in what is now north County Kerry and Sliabh Luachra, both named after them.
- Ciarraige Cuirche - located due south of what is now Cork City, in Munster.
