= American Video Awards =

Former annual music video award show

The American Video Awards (1983–1987) was an annual music video award show taped for distribution to television. The First Annual American Video Awards was hosted by radio personality Casey Kasem, and Kasem continued in his role as emcee of the show in succeeding years. The first (1983), second (1984) and third (April 1985) shows were syndicated to television channels across the country. The Fourth Annual American Video Awards (November 1985), however, was taped for broadcast on ABC to be aired during prime time, the first time that a video awards show was shown on prime time network television. The fifth (1987) show again aired in syndication. It was the last American Video Awards show. Two award ceremonies were held during 1985: the third annual ceremony was held in April 1985 and, because of contractual obligations to ABC, the fourth annual ceremony was held less than a year later, in November 1985.

== Background ==
The winners of The First Annual American Video Awards (1983) were selected by a small panel of about a dozen people: Casey Kasem, writers from Rolling Stone and The Hollywood Reporter magazines, a film editor, and a television director. In late 1983 Kasem and two producers from his television show, America's Top 10, formed the American Video Association and by the time of The Second Annual American Video Awards (1984) it had an estimated membership of 500. Award winners in 1984 were nominated and voted on by the association membership.

Awards for music videos proliferated in the 1980s, and by 1984, video awards were being given by Billboard magazine, the American Film Institute, the Grammys, and for the first time in 1984, MTV, when the music video cable television channel aired its inaugural MTV Video Music Awards. In April 1984, Tom Popson, writer for the Chicago Tribune, said, “. . . as yet no single award has emerged in the still-new medium as indisputably the most prestigious and widely recognized.” To Popson, Kasem expressed his hopes that the American Video Awards, which he dubbed the "Avas," would become that award for music videos, analogous to the Oscars for film, the Emmys for television and the Grammys for music; that the newly formed American Video Association would eventually become an "academy" of music video; and that the award show would be broadcast live on network television. Toward those ends, to give the American Video Awards and the newly formed American Video Association credibility, an advisory board was formed which included presidents of Capitol, Columbia, MCA, Polygram and RCA record companies, and chairmen of the boards of Warner Bros., A&M and Scotti Bros. record companies.

Kasem seemed to make progress on two of his three goals from the 1984 Chicago Tribune article. By the time of The Third Annual American Video Awards, in April 1985, the American Video Association had become the National Academy of Video Arts and Sciences (NAVAS), which was listed as the sponsor of the show, with Jennifer Libbee serving as executive director, and Alan Winnikoff serving as spokesperson. Some news articles at the time claimed that the academy was founded in 1980. Although it didn't air live, a taped version of The Fourth Annual American Video Awards did make it to network television in November 1985. It was edited down to a one-hour broadcast on ABC. But public recognition of the American Video Awards as the most prestigious in the field remained elusive, despite Kasem's hopes and efforts. In September 1985, after the second MTV Video Music Awards aired, Steven Dupler, writing for Billboard magazine, said, "MTV has definitely established its awards as the ceremony for the industry, the American Video Awards and others notwithstanding."

Cash Box magazine reported that NAVAS membership was reorganized in the spring of 1985: "The new plan . . . allows for two distinct categories of membership: active (voting) and associate (non-voting). The active membership was further divided into craft and administrative divisions. Technical awards are voted only by active draft members." In November 1985, at the time of The Fourth Annual American Video Awards network television broadcast, the national director of NAVAS, Mick Kennedy, said voting members were required to have worked on at least two videos, or be an executive in a video-related field. He said the academy membership was "tightened" in order to assure skeptics that the video awards were based on merit rather than industry politics, and he tried to make the case that NAVAS had the same credibility in the video field as the National Academy of Recording Arts and Sciences (NARAS), which sponsored the Grammys, had in the music field. Kennedy admitted that, at first, the American Video Awards was, "'. . . just an excuse for a television show.'" But, the award sponsors changed their attitude when, "'. . . we realized we were the only group that allowed all the different elements of the video industry to get together.'" He argued there was a professional difference between the American Video Awards and the MTV Video Music Awards: "'The MTV awards are designed to promote MTV. The American Video Awards are designed to promote the music-video industry. We're an industry award, MTV isn't.'"

The Fifth Annual American Video Awards was held in February 1987. Its distribution to television outlets reverted to syndication, and the show received some criticism in the press. It was dubbed the "Not-so-live video awards" in the Greenwood, South Carolina Index-Journal. The Philadelphia Daily News called it "hokey." Cash Box magazine said the presenters were a "curious assortment of celebrities," because so many of them had little to do with the music industry. Later that year, in December 1987, nationally syndicated newspaper columnist Ethlie Ann Vare sounded the death knell for the American Video Awards, writing that they were, "probably on the way out". Indeed, The Fifth Annual American Video Awards was the last.

== Award shows ==
=== The First Annual American Video Awards (1983) ===
==== Narrative ====
At The First Annual American Video Awards ceremony (1983), awards were given for six categories and an artist was selected for induction into the "Hall of Fame." For a video to be nominated, the song had to be in the top ten of the Billboard charts in 1982. Nominees and winners were selected by a small panel of people: Casey Kasem, music reporters, a film editor, and a television director. The show and the nominees were announced in a full-page advertisement in the March 26, 1983 issue of Billboard magazine. The show was produced by Jennifer Libbee in association with Scotti Bros./Syd Vinnedge Television Production and Casey Kasem Productions. Mick Fleetwood was the only winning performer present to accept his award. Despite the show being clearly titled as The First Annual American Video Awards in the Billboard announcement, at the later times of the show's appearances on television in syndication, several newspapers gave it other names, among them, "America's Top 10 Video Awards," and the "Super Bullet Video Awards," suggesting some trouble with the show's identity at the outset.

==== Program ====
Ceremony date: April 6, 1983

Ceremony location: Beverly Theatre in Beverly Hills, California

Host: Casey Kasem

Presenters: Grace Slick, Mick Fleetwood, Pia Zadora, Rosanne Cash, Toni Basil, Patrick Simmons, Michael Nesmith, Rindy Ross, Larry Graham, The Gap Band, Mickey Thomas, John Schneider

==== Nominees ====
Nominees: First Annual American Video Awards (1983)

Category	Nominee(s)	Video	Recording Artist	Result	Ref
Best Performance	Peter Wolf	"Centerfold"	J. Geils Band	Won	
Best Performance	Men at Work	"Who Can It Be Now?"	Men at Work	Nominated	
Best Performance	Martha Davis	"Only the Lonely"	The Motels	Nominated	
Best Performance	Joan Jett	"I Love Rock 'N Roll"	Joan Jett	Nominated	
Best Performance	Olivia Newton-John	"Physical"	Olivia Newton-John	Nominated	
Best Video of the Year	Rod Stewart, Lexi Godfrey (producer) or Simon Fields (producer) (Note: Both the Associated Press (AP) and the United Press International (UPI) reported Simon Fields as the winning producer of the Rod Stewart music video, "Young Turks." In an authored article dated previous to the 1983 award ceremony, Billboard magazine listed Lexi Godfrey as the nominated producer for "Young Turks.")	"Young Turks"	Rod Stewart	Won	
Best Video of the Year	J. Geils Band, Paul Justman (producer)	"Centerfold"	J. Geils Band	Nominated	
Best Video of the Year	Men at Work, Tony Stevens (producer)	"Who Can It Be Now?"	Men at Work	Nominated	
Best Video of the Year	The Motels, Jacqui Byford (producer)	"Only the Lonely"	The Motels	Nominated	
Best Video of the Year	Toto, Simon Fields (producer)	Rosanna	"Toto"	Nominated	
Best Soul Video	Paul McCartney, Stevie Wonder, John Weaver (producer)	"Ebony and Ivory"	Paul McCartney and Stevie Wonder	Won	
Best Soul Video	Tom Tom Club, Andy Morahan (producer)	"Genius of Love"	Tom Tom Club	Nominated	
Best Soul Video	Earth, Wind & Fire, Michael Schultz (producer)	"Let's Groove"	Earth, Wind & Fire	Nominated	
Best Soul Video	Shalamar, Craig Martin (producer), Chris Gangadean (executive producer)	"A Night to Remember"	Shalamar	Nominated	
Best Soul Video	The Gap Band, George Garvin (producer)	"You Dropped a Bomb on Me"	The Gap Band	Nominated	
Best Country Video	Merle Haggard, Terry Lickona (producer)	"Are the Good Times Really Over?"	Merle Haggard	Won	
Best Country Video	Rosanne Cash, Michael Nesmith (producer)	"I Wonder"	Rosanne Cash	Nominated	
Best Country Video	The Statler Brothers, Kitty Moon (producer)	"Whatever"	The Statler Brothers	Nominated	
Best Country Video	Juice Newton, Kevin McCormick (producer), Michael Nesmith (executive producer)	"Love's Been a Little Bit Hard On Me"	Juice Newton	Nominated	
Best Country Video	T. G. Sheppard, Julian Cole (producer)	"Finally"	T. G. Sheppard	Nominated	
Best Director	Russell Mulcahy	"Young Turks"	Rod Stewart	Won	
Best Director	Paul Justman	"Centerfold"	J. Geils Band	Nominated	
Best Director	Peter Conn	"Abracadabra"	Steve Miller Band	Nominated	
Best Director	Brian Grant	"Physical"	Olivia Newton-John	Nominated	
Best Director	Russell Mulcahy	"Only the Lonely"	The Motels	Nominated	
Special Merit Video	Fleetwood Mac, Mickey Shapiro (producer)	"Gypsy"	Fleetwood Mac	Won	
Special Merit Video	Peter Gabriel, Chrissy Smith (producer)	"Shock the Monkey"	Peter Gabriel	Nominated	
Special Merit Video	Billy Joel, Jackie Adams (producer)	"Pressure"	Billy Joel	Nominated	
Special Merit Video	Billy Joel, Jackie Adams (producer)	"Allentown"	Billy Joel	Nominated	
Special Merit Video	Adam Ant, Mike Mansfield (producer)	"Goody Two Shoes"	Adam Ant	Nominated	

==== Winners ====
- Hall of Fame: Paul McCartney.
- Best Performance: Peter Wolf, "Centerfold," tied with Martha Davis, "Only the Lonely".
- Best Video of the Year: "Young Turks," Rod Stewart, Simon Fields (producer), or Lexi Godfrey (producer).
- Best Soul Video: "Ebony and Ivory," Paul McCartney, Stevie Wonder, John Weaver (producer).
- Best Country Video: "Are the Good Times Really Over?" Merle Haggard, Terry Licona (producer).
- Best Director: Russel Mulcahy, "Young Turks" (Rod Stewart).
- Special Merit Video: "Gypsy," Mick Fleetwood, Mickey Shapiro (producer).

=== The Second Annual American Video Awards (1984) ===
==== Narrative ====
Winners in eleven categories plus the special recognition award, Hall of Fame, were reported for The Second Annual American Video Awards. The Best Performance category was now expanded to Best Performance, Male; Best Performance, Female; and Best Performance, Group. The Best Video of the Year category was eliminated, and the category, Best Pop Video, was added. Other categories added were on the technical side of video production: Best Editing, Best Lighting Design, Best Choreography, and Best Art Direction. The 1983 category, Special Merit Video was eliminated.

Videos produced and distributed to television outlets between December 1, 1982, and December 1, 1983, were eligible for nomination. Nominees and winners were selected by the 500 members of the new American Video Association. The Hall of Fame awardee was selected by the "distinguished" advisory board of the American Video Association, which included presidents of Capitol, Columbia, MCA, Polygram and RCA record companies, and chairmen of the boards of Warner Bros., A&M and Scotti Bros. record companies. Nominees were announced on March 5, 1984, at an event held at the Kathy Gallagher restaurant in Los Angeles, California.

The ceremony was taped, edited to a two-hour program, and aired in syndication by television outlets at later dates. Michael Jackson, whose videos dominated the awards with 24 nominations, and won in four categories, did not attend the ceremony. Writer Tom Popson surmised that television viewers would be less inclined to watch the program because the outcome was known ahead of the telecast.

==== Program ====
Ceremony date: April 5, 1984

Ceremony location: Wilshire Ebell Theatre, Los Angeles, California

Host: Casey Kasem

Presenters: Patti LaBelle, Martha Davis and the Motels, Toni Basil, Deborah Allen, Herbie Hancock, La Toya Jackson, Jan and Dean, Juice Newton, Moon Zappa Frank Stallone, Grace Slick, Ozzy Osbourne, Little Richard

Performers: "Weird Al" Yankovic

==== Nominees ====
See.

==== Winners ====
- Hall of Fame: Michael Nesmith
- Best Performance, Male: Michael Jackson, "Beat It."
- Best Performance, Female: Cyndi Lauper, "Girls Just Want to Have Fun."
- Best Performance, Group: The Police, "Every Breath You Take."
- Best Pop Video: Michael Jackson, "Beat It."
- Best Soul Video: "Rockit," Herbie Hancock.
- Best Country Video: "Pancho and Lefty," Merle Haggard and Willie Nelson.
- Best Director: Bob Giraldi, "Beat It" (Michael Jackson).
- Best Editing: Roo Aiken, Kevin Godley, Lol Creme, "Rockit" (Herbie Hancock).
- Best Lighting Design: Daniel Pearl, "Every Breath You Take" (The Police).
- Best Choreography: Michael Peters, "Beat It" (Michael Jackson).
- Best Art Direction: Kevin Godley, Lol Creme, "Rockit" (Herbie Hancock).

=== The Third Annual American Video Awards (April 1985) ===
==== Narrative ====
Winners in fifteen categories plus two special recognition awards, Hall of Fame and Humanitarian Award, were reported for The Third Annual American Video Awards. The categories now included the new categories of Best Long Form Video, Best Home Video, Best New Video Artist, Best Costume Design, and Best Set Design. The category, Best Art Direction, was dropped. Candidates for award nominations included all videos produced and distributed to cable or network television stations between December 2, 1983, and December 1, 1984, and nominees were selected after two ballots taken of the 500 members of the new National Academy of Video Arts and Sciences (NAVAS). Nominations were announced at the Ma Maison restaurant in West Hollywood, California, on March 4, 1985.

The ceremony was taped, edited to a two-hour program, and aired in syndication by television outlets at later dates. Jet magazine noted that there were only two "Black" winners, Michael Jackson and Prince, and apparently neither of them attended the ceremony. Jet reported that Jackson's sister, Rebbie Jackson, accepted awards on his behalf, and Carolyn McGuire of the Chicago Tribune reported that Prince did not "show up." Rod Stewart, however, was on hand to receive his Hall of Fame Award, which was presented to him by James Brown. Two Cyndi Lauper videos, "Time After Time" and "She Bop", won in six different categories, and Lauper did attend the ceremony and received her awards on stage.

==== Program ====
Ceremony date: April 3, 1985

Ceremony location: Santa Monica Civic Auditorium, Santa Monica, California

Hosts: Casey Kasem, Herbie Hancock, Lisa Hartman

Presenters: James Brown, Philip Bailey, Deborah Allen, Stephen Bishop, Laura Branigan, Michael Damian, Ronnie Dio, Lita Ford, Lee Greenwood, James Ingram, Grace Jones, the kids from "Fame," B. B. King, Quiet Riot, REO Speedwagon, Sylvia, Pia Zadora, Vanity, "Weird Al" Yankovic

Performers: New Edition, John Cafferty & The Beaver Brown Band, Moe Bandy and Joe Stampley

==== Nominees ====
See:

==== Winners ====
- Hall of Fame: Rod Stewart.
- Best Performance, Male: "Weird Al" Yankovic, "Eat It."
- Best Performance, Female: Cyndi Lauper, "Time After Time."
- Best Performance, Group: Huey Lewis and the News, "Heart of Rock and Roll."
- Best Pop Video: "Time After Time," Cyndi Lauper.
- Best Soul Video: Prince, "When Doves Cry."
- Best Country Video: "Where's the Dress?" Moe Bandy, Joe Stampley
- Best Director: Edd Griles, "Time After Time" (Cyndi Lauper).
- Best Editing: Zbigniew Rybczynski, "Diana D" (Chuck Mangione).
- Best Lighting Design: Peter Kaminsky and/or Michael Negrin, "Time After Time" (Cyndi Lauper). (Note: The United Press International (UPI) reported Peter Kiminsky as the winner. The Associated Press (AP) reported Michael Negrin as the winner. Billboard magazine had reported Peter Kaminsky as a nominee on a date previous to the April 1985 award ceremony. In a full page "thank you" to people who worked on the Cyndi Lauper videos, Edd Griles, director of the "Time After Time" music video, mentions both "Mike Negrin" with crew members, and "Peter Kaminsky" with cast members.)
- Best Choreography: Pat Birch, "She Bop" (Cyndi Lauper).
- Best Long Form Video: Michael Jackson for "The Making of Thriller."
- Best Home Video: Michael Jackson for "The Making of Thriller."
- Best New Video Artist: Wham! (George Michael and Andrew Ridgeley), "Wake Me Up Before You Go Go"
- Best Costume Design: Laura Wills, Biff Chandler, "She Bop" (Cyndi Lauper).
- Best Set Design: Gray Lipley, "The Wild Boys" (Duran Duran).
- Humanitarian Award: Ken Kragan, "We Are the World"

=== The Fourth Annual American Video Awards (November 1985) ===
==== Narrative ====
The Fourth Annual American Video Awards (November 1985) was not only the first and only American Video Awards show to be broadcast on network television, it was also the first music video awards show ever to be shown on prime time network television. Although the past three ceremonies had all been held in the spring (The Third Annual American Video Awards was held just seven months prior, in April that same year), the network, ABC, wanted to air the fourth show in November. This shortened the eligibility period for nominated videos, which was from December 2, 1984, to September 30, 1985. ABC also chose the program's host, Tony Danza, who starred in one of its most successful sitcoms at the time, "Who's the Boss?" This was the only American Video Awards ceremony that was not hosted or co-hosted by Casey Kasem.

Awards were sponsored by the National Academy of Video Arts and Sciences (NAVAS), and nominees and winners were selected by the Academy. Nominations were announced on October 29, 1985, at Ma Maison restaurant in West Hollywood, California, at an event described as a "mock award ceremony," emceed by Casey Kasem. "Weird Al" Yankovic was the only nominee to participate.

Winners in seventeen award categories were reported. The name of the award, Best Soul Video, was changed to Best Urban Contemporary Video for this nationally televised award show. The category, Best Long Form Video was dropped. Three new categories were added: Best Live Concert Video, Best Cinematography, and Best Special Effects. Best New Video artist seems to have been renamed simply as Best New Artist. Cash Box magazine had reported that the Hall of Fame awardee would be announced at the ceremony, but no subsequent reports naming the awardee have been found thus far.

Casey Kasem along with Toni Scotti and Syd Vinnedge of Scotti Bros./Syd Vinnedge Productions, served as executive producers of the show, which was taped in advance and edited down to one hour for broadcast. Accordingly, only eight "artistic" award categories made it on the air, listed by Daniel Brogan of the Chicago Tribune as: "Best Pop Video, Best Urban Contemporary Video, Best Country Video, Best New Group, Best Male Performance, Best Female Performance, Best Duo or Group Performance and Best Home Video." Two videos by Bruce Springsteen won in three categories, but he did not attend the ceremony. His bandmate, saxophonist Clarence Clemens, accepted the awards in Springsteen's place.

==== Program ====
Ceremony date: Wednesday, November 20, 1985

Ceremony location: Wiltern Theater. Los Angeles, California.

Host: Tony Danza.

Presenters: Clarence Clemons, Grace Jones, Kenny Rogers, Apollonia Kotero, Andy Taylor of Duran Duran, Lorenzo Lamas, Herbie Hancock, The Weather Girls, Howie Mandel, Al Jarreau, The Judds, "Weird Al" Yankovic, Lisa Hartman, Shari Belafonte-Harper

Performers: Sheila E, Martin Mull

Television broadcast date: Friday, November 22, 1985. Network: ABC

==== Nominees ====
For list of nominees in nine "artistic categories," see:

==== Winners ====
- Hall of Fame: -----
- Best Performance, Male: Bruce Springsteen, "Glory Days."
- Best Performance, Female: Aimee Mann, "Voices Carry."
- Best Performance, Group: Wham!, "Everything She Wants."
- Best Pop Video: "Glory Days," Bruce Springsteen.
- Best Urban Contemporary Video: "Party All the Time," Eddie Murphy.
- Best Country Video: "Country Boy," Ricky Skaggs.
- Best Director: Zbigniew Rybczynski, "She Went Pop," (I Am Siam)
- Best Editor: David Yardley, "Money for Nothing," (Dire Straits).
- Best Lighting Design: Alan Jones, "All You Zombies" (Hooters).
- Best Choreography: Kenny Ortega, "Material Girl" (Madonna).
- Best Home Video: "Wham!, The Video," Wham!.
- Best New Artist: Sade.
- Best Costume Design: Marlene Stewart, "Material Girl" (Madonna).
- Best Set Design: Zbigniew Rybczynski, "She Went Pop" (I Am Siam).
- Best Live Concert Video: "Money for Nothing," Dire Straits.
- Best Cinematography: Michael Ballhaus, "I'm On Fire" (Bruce Springsteen).
- Best Special Effects: Michael Patterson and Candace Reckinger, "Take On Me," (A-Ha).

=== The Fifth Annual American Video Awards (1987) ===
==== Narrative ====
The Fifth Annual American Video Awards (1987), produced by Scotti/Vinnedge Television in association with Casey Kasem Productions, was the last one. A power failure contributed to the live ceremony's four-hour length. The show was taped to be aired at a later time in syndication, and was edited down to a two-hour program. The Philadelphia Daily News called the ceremony "hokey." Cash Box magazine criticized the show for including award presenters who had little to do with the music industry, calling them a "curious assortment of celebrities." The Greenwood, South Carolina Index-Journal dubbed it the "Not-so-live video awards".

The awards were sponsored by the National Academy of Video Arts and Sciences (NAVAS), and the nominees and winners were selected by the Academy. Winners in sixteen categories plus a Hall of Fame awardee were reported. Best Lighting Design and Best Set Design were replaced by Best Art Director, and the category, Best Live Concert Video, was replaced by Best Stage Performance.

Happily, Peter Gabriel, whose videos won in five categories, and who was inducted into the NAVAS Hall of Fame, did attend the ceremony and accepted his awards on stage. It was reported that backstage he was "mobbed by admirers", and he "retreated in order to avoid being crushed" by photographers.

==== Program ====
Ceremony date: February 26, 1987 Ceremony location: Scottish Rite Auditorium in Los Angeles, California.

Emcee: Casey Kasem

Hosts: Shari Belafonte Harper, Graham Nash

Presenters: "Weird Al" Yankovic, Little Richard, Dwight Yoakam, Lisa Lisa, Gregory Abbott, Diana Canova, Gallagher, Roseanne Barr, Delta Burke, Jackée Harry, David Hasselhoff, Jean Kasem, Tim Reid, Tracy Scoggins

Performers: Wang Chung, The Bangles, Richard Belzer, Bobcat Goldthwait

==== Nominees ====
See:

==== Winners ====
- Hall of Fame: Peter Gabriel
- Best Performance, Male: Peter Gabriel, "Sledgehammer."
- Best Performance, Female: Madonna, "Papa Don't Preach."
- Best Performance, Group: The Bangles, "Walk Like an Egyptian."
- Best Pop Video: "Sledgehammer" (Peter Gabriel), Adam Whitaker (producer)
- Best Urban Contemporary Video: "Kiss," Prince and the Revolution, Rebecca Blake (producer)
- Best Country Video: "Honky Tonk Man," Dwight Yoakam, Sherman Halsey (producer).
- Best Director: Stephen Johnson, "Sledgehammer" (Peter Gabriel).
- Best Editor: Peter Gabriel, Limelight Productions "Sledgehammer"
- Best Choreographer: Paula Abdul, "Velcro Fly" (ZZ Top).
- Best Home Video: "Last World Dream," Howard Jones.
- Best New Artist: Peter Cetera.
- Best Costume Design: Malissa Daniel, "Goin' Crazy!" (David Lee Roth).
- Best Cinematography: Bobby Byrne, "25 or 6 to 4" (Chicago).
- Best Special Effects: Peter Gabriel, Limelight Productions, "Sledgehammer".
- Best Art Director: Mike Hanan, "Open Your Heart" (Madonna).
- Best Stage Performance: David Lee Roth, "Yanky Rose."
