= Casey Kasem =

American disc jockey and actor (1932–2014)

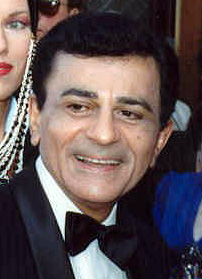
- Kasem at the 1989 Emmy Awards
- Born: Kemal Amin Kasem; April 27, 1932; Detroit, Michigan, U.S.
- Died: June 15, 2014 (aged 82); Gig Harbor, Washington, U.S.
- Resting place: Oslo Western Civil Cemetery, Oslo, Norway
- Education: Wayne State University
- Occupations: Disc jockey; actor; radio presenter; activist
- Years active: 1952–2013
- Spouses: Linda Myers (m. 1972; div. 1979) Jean Thompson (m. 1980)
- Children: 4, including Kerri and Mike

Signature
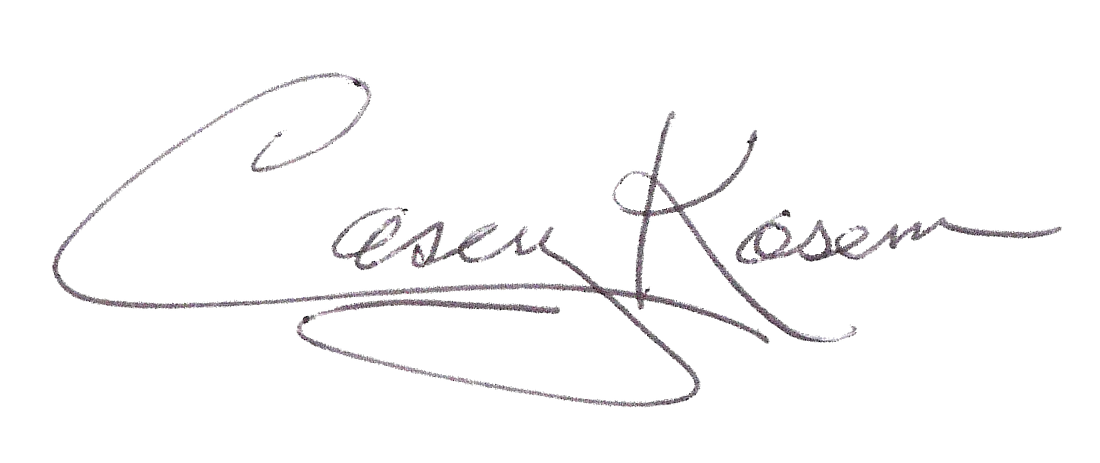

Kemal Amin "Casey" Kasem (/ˈkeɪsəm/ KAY-səm; April 27, 1932 – June 15, 2014) was an American disc jockey, actor, and radio presenter who created and hosted several radio countdown programs, notably American Top 40, as well as the weekly syndicated television series America's Top 10. He was the first actor to voice Shaggy Rogers in the Scooby-Doo franchise (1969 to 1997 and 2002 to 2009) and Dick Grayson/Robin in Super Friends (1973–1985).

Kasem began hosting the original American Top 40 on the weekend of July 4, 1970, and remained there until 1988. He hosted Casey's Top 40 from January 1989 to February 1998, then revived American Top 40 in 1998. He hosted two countdowns for the adult contemporary format from 1992 to 2009. He also founded the American Video Awards in 1983 and continued to co-produce and host it until its final show in 1987.

Kasem provided many commercial voiceovers, performed many voices for children's television (such as Sesame Street and the Transformers cartoon series), was "the voice of NBC", and helped with the annual Jerry Lewis MDA Labor Day Telethon.

== Early life ==
Kemal Amin Kasem was born on April 27, 1932, in Detroit, Michigan, to Lebanese Druze parents Helen Dow (also Helen Sefa) and Amin Kasem, who were grocers. His father, whose original surname is sometimes given as Konsow or Kansao, immigrated from Moukhtara, Lebanon while his mother was born to a Lebanese family in Carbondale, Pennsylvania. He was named after Mustafa Kemal Atatürk, whom his father respected. Kasem's parents did not allow their children to speak Arabic and insisted that they assimilate into American life.

In the 1940s, the radio show Make Believe Ballroom reportedly inspired Kasem to pursue a career as a radio disc jockey. He received his first experience in radio covering sports at Northwestern High School in Detroit. He then attended Wayne State University, where he voiced children on radio programs such as The Lone Ranger and Challenge of the Yukon. In 1952, he was drafted into the Army and sent to Korea where he worked as a disc jockey and announcer on the American Forces Korea Network (AFKN).

== Career ==
=== Early career ===
After the war, Kasem began his professional broadcasting career in Flint, Michigan, then worked at Detroit's WJLB and WJBK—and portrayed children's television host "Krogo the Clown"—but left broadcasting to help tend to the family grocery store in Fenton, Michigan. Kasem unsuccessfully attempted work as a stage actor in New York City for six months, auditioning for a role in the off-Broadway production Ivan Of, but lost out to Ed Asner. Returning to Detroit, Kasem re-applied at WJBK but was promptly referred to co-owned WJW, which not only had a late-evening slot open but a hosting role for Cleveland Bandstand over WJW-TV as well. Cleveland's emerging status as a popular music epicenter appealed to Kasem, having been aware of WERE's Bill Randle dating back to when Randle worked in Detroit. Kasem identified himself as "Casey at the Mike" owing to varied misspellings of his name in both contemporary news accounts and station promos.

Kasem's tenure in Cleveland was a brief but successful one, entering the market "with a vengeance" against Top 40 stations WHK and KYW. Within three months, Kasem reached second place behind WHK in ratings surveys on weeknights and number one on Saturday nights. Kasem's predecessor in the time slot, Pete "Mad Daddy" Myers, partially inspired Kasem's presentation on-air, but Kasem felt compelled to develop a unique on-air persona to distinguish himself. The first three hours of his evening show remained devoted to R&B recordings in a "high-energy rock" style, while the fourth hour was more laidback with his news reader as a co-host. The R&B selections and "wild-tracking" by Kasem also distinguished himself from WJW's daytime pop-oriented fare, which typically featured Perry Como and The McGuire Sisters as core artists.

Nightly features included Kasem labeling songs as "...of the night", with random phrases or names as a descriptor. After the payola scandal broke out and enveloped Alan Freed's career, Kasem began a regular comedy bit called the "Payola Tune of the Night," which WJW management encouraged under the assumption it would dissuade listeners from thinking he was under investigation as well. Ultimately, Kasem's career was not negatively impacted by the payola scandal. One notable stunt involved Kasem and Diana Trask engaging in an 85-second-long kiss for a "world record" distinction on September 14, 1959, with a news reader describing the kiss on-air. While hosting Cleveland Bandstand, Kasem started to take pep pills to lose weight; one day, he forgot them when he went to the station, and the pang of conscience he experienced upon returning for them to his apartment prompted him to give up the habit.

After WJW switched formats to beautiful music, which Kasem attributed directly to the payola scandal, he left WJW for Buffalo's WBNY but remained in contact with friends in the Cleveland area. At KYA in San Francisco, the general manager suggested he tone down his delivery and talk about the records instead. At KEWB in Oakland, California, Kasem was both the music director and an on-air personality. He said he was inspired by a Who's Who in Pop Music, 1962 magazine he found in the trash. He created a show that mixed biographical tidbits about the artists he played, and attracted the attention of Bill Gavin, who tried to recruit him as a partner. After Kasem joined KRLA in Los Angeles in 1963, his career began to blossom and he championed the R&B music of East L.A.

Kasem acted in a number of low-budget movies and radio dramas. While hosting "dance hops" on local television, he attracted the attention of Dick Clark, who hired him as co-host of a daily teenage music show called Shebang, starting in 1964. Kasem's roles on network TV series included Hawaii Five-O and Ironside. In 1967, he appeared on The Dating Game, and played the role of "Mouth" in the motorcycle gang film The Glory Stompers. In 1969, he played the role of Knife in the film Wild Wheels, and had a small role in another biker movie, The Cycle Savages, starring Bruce Dern and Melody Patterson, and The Incredible 2-Headed Transplant (also with Dern).

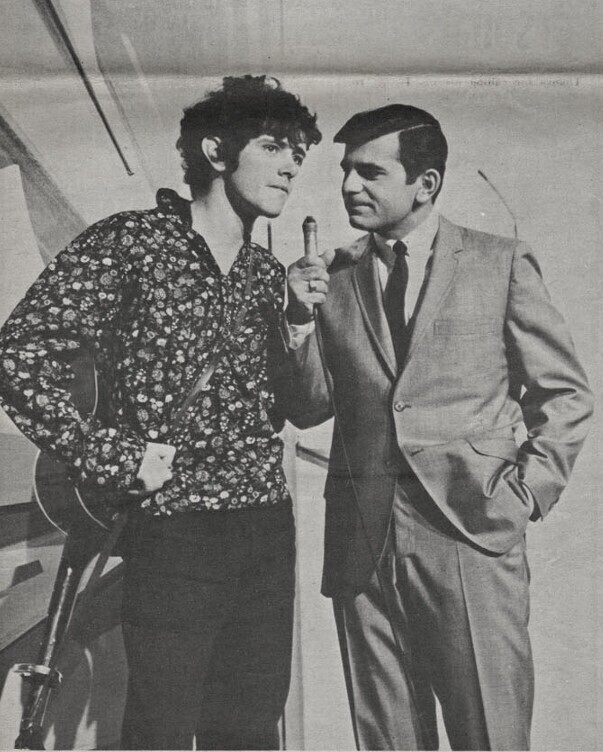
Kasem (on the right) interviewing Donovan, 1965

Kasem's voice was the key to his career. In 1964 during the Beatlemania craze, Kasem had a minor hit single called "Letter from Elaina", a spoken-word recording that told the story of a girl who met George Harrison after a San Francisco Beatles concert. At the end of the 1960s, he began working as a voice actor. In 1969, he started one of his most famous roles, the voice of Shaggy on Scooby-Doo, Where Are You!. He also voiced the drummer Groove from The Cattanooga Cats that year.

=== 1970–1988: Acting/voiceover work and American Top 40 ===
On July 4, 1970, Kasem, along with Don Bustany, Tom Rounds, and Ron Jacobs, launched the weekly radio program American Top 40 (AT40). At the time, top 40 radio was on the decline as DJs preferred to play album-oriented progressive rock. Loosely based on the TV program Your Hit Parade, the show counted down from No. 40 to No. 1 based on the Billboard Hot 100 weekly chart. Kasem mixed in biographical information and trivia about the artists, as well as flashbacks and "long-distance dedication" segments in which he read letters from listeners wishing to dedicate songs to distant loved ones. Frequently, he mentioned a trivia fact about an unnamed singer before a commercial break, then provided the name of the singer after returning from the break. Kasem ended the program with his signature sign-off, "Keep your feet on the ground and keep reaching for the stars."

The show debuted on seven stations but soon went nationwide. In October 1978, the show expanded from three hours to four. American Top 40's success spawned several imitators, including a weekly half-hour music video television show, America's Top 10, hosted by Kasem himself. "When we first went on the air, I thought we would be around for at least 20 years," he later remarked. "I knew the formula worked. I knew people tuned in to find out what the number 1 record was." Because of his great knowledge of music, Kasem became known for his commentaries on music history that he interspersed with trivia about the artists.

In 1971, Kasem provided the character voice of Peter Cottontail in the Rankin/Bass production of Here Comes Peter Cottontail. In the same year, he appeared in The Incredible 2-Headed Transplant, in what is probably his best-remembered acting role. From 1973 to 1985, Kasem voiced Robin for several Super Friends franchise shows. In 1980, he voiced Merry in The Return of the King. He also voiced Alexander Cabot III on Josie and the Pussycats and Josie and the Pussycats in Outer Space, and supplied a number of voices for Sesame Street.

In the late 1970s, Kasem portrayed an actor who imitated Columbo in the Hardy Boys/Nancy Drew Mysteries two-part episode "The Mystery of the Hollywood Phantom." He portrayed a golf commentator in an episode of Charlie's Angels titled "Winning is for Losers", and appeared on Police Story, Quincy, M.E. and Switch. In 1977, Kasem was hired as the narrator for the ABC sitcom Soap, but quit after the pilot episode because of the show's controversial content. Rod Roddy took his place on the program. For a period from the late 1970s to the early 1980s, he was the staff announcer for the NBC television network. In 1984, Kasem made a voice cameo in Ghostbusters, reprising his role as the host of American Top 40.

In 1983 Kasem helped found the American Video Awards, an annual music video awards show taped for distribution for television, which he also hosted and co-produced. His goal was to make it the "Oscars" of music videos. There were only five award shows. The final show aired in 1987.

=== 1988–1998: Casey's Top 40 ===
In 1988, Kasem left American Top 40 because of a contract dispute with ABC Radio Network. He signed a five-year, $15 million contract with Westwood One and started Casey's Top 40, which used a different chart, the Radio & Records Contemporary (CHR)/Pop radio airplay chart (also employed contemporaneously by Rick Dees Weekly Top 40). He also hosted two shorter versions of the show, Casey's Hot 20 and Casey's Countdown. During the late 1990s, Kasem hosted the Radio Hall of Fame induction ceremony.

Kasem voiced Mark in Battle of the Planets and several Transformers characters: Bluestreak, Cliffjumper, Teletraan I and Dr. Arkeville. He left Transformers during the third season because he believed the show contained offensive caricatures of Arabs and Arab countries. In an article in 1990, he explained:

A few years ago, I was doing one of the voices in the TV cartoon series, Transformers. One week, the script featured an evil character named Abdul, King of Carbombya. He was like all the other cartoon Arabs. I asked the director, 'Are there any good Arabs in this script for balance?' We looked. There was one other—but he was no different than Abdul. So, I told the show's director that, in good conscience, I couldn't be a part of that show.

From 1989 to 1998, Kasem hosted Nick at Nite's New Year's Eve countdown of the top reruns of the year. He also made cameo appearances on Saved by the Bell and ALF in the 1990s. In 1997, after voicing Shaggy Rogers on an episode of Johnny Bravo, Kasem quit his role in a dispute over a Burger King commercial, with Billy West and Scott Innes taking over the character in the late 1990s and early 2000s.

=== 1998–2009: American Top 40 second run ===
The original American Top 40, hosted by Shadoe Stevens after Kasem's departure, was cancelled in 1995. Kasem regained the rights to the name in 1997, and the show was back on the air in 1998, on the AMFM Network (later acquired by Premiere Radio Networks).

At the end of 2003, Kasem announced he would leave AT40 once his contract expired and would be replaced by Ryan Seacrest. He agreed to a new contract to continue hosting his weekly adult contemporary countdown shows in the interim, which at the time were both titled American Top 20. In 2005 Kasem renewed his deal with Premiere Radio Networks to continue hosting his shows, one of which had been reduced to ten songs and was retitled American Top 10 to reflect the change.

In April 2005, a television special called American Top 40 Live aired on the Fox network, hosted by Seacrest, with Kasem appearing on the show. In 2008, Kasem did the voice-over for WGN America's Out of Sight Retro Night. He was also the host of the short-lived American version of 100% during the 1998–99 season.

In June 2009, Premiere announced it would no longer produce Kasem's two remaining countdowns, ending their eleven-year relationship. Kasem, by this point at age 77, decided against finding another syndicator or replacement host, citing a desire to explore other avenues such as writing a memoir. He sent a press release announcing he would retire from radio on the July 4 weekend, the 39th anniversary of the first countdown show.

Kasem also performed TV commercial voice-overs throughout his career, appearing in more than 100 commercials.

In 2002, Kasem returned to the role of Shaggy, agreeing to continue on the condition that his character returned to vegetarianism (based on his personal lifestyle). In 2009, he retired from voice acting, with his final performance being the voice of Shaggy in Scooby-Doo! and the Samurai Sword. He did voice Shaggy again for "The Official BBC Children in Need Medley", but went uncredited by his request. Although officially retired from acting, Kasem provided the voice of Colton Rogers, Shaggy's father, on a recurring basis for the 2010–2013 series Scooby-Doo! Mystery Incorporated, once again uncredited at his request.

As for Kasem's distinctive voice quality, "It's a natural quality of huskiness in the midrange of my voice that I call 'garbage,'" he stated to The New York Times. "It's not a clear-toned announcer's voice. It's more like the voice of the guy next door."

== Personal life ==
Kasem was a dedicated vegan, supported animal rights and environmental causes, and was a critic of factory farming. He initially quit voicing Shaggy in the mid to late 1990s when asked to voice Shaggy in a Burger King commercial, but returned in 2002 after negotiating to have Shaggy become a vegetarian once again.

Kasem was active in politics, supporting Lebanese-American and Arab-American causes, an interest triggered by the 1982 Israeli invasion of Lebanon. He wrote a brochure, "Arab-Americans: Making a Difference", published by the Arab American Institute. He called for a more fair depiction of heroes and villains on behalf of all cultures in Disney's 1994 sequel to Aladdin called The Return of Jafar. In 1996, he was honored as "Man of the Year" by the American Druze Society. Kasem campaigned against the Gulf War, advocating non-military means of pressuring Saddam Hussein into withdrawing from Kuwait, was an advocate of Palestinian independence, and arranged conflict-resolution workshops for Arab Americans and Jewish Americans.

Kasem, among 75 other entertainers, also participated in a relief project at Paramount Studios to record ‘For You, Armenia,’ a song written by French singer Charles Aznavour, to raise money for the victims of the devastating 1989 earthquake in Armenia. He stated the project to be a reflection of the times: “What we are reflecting is the mind set of all people today. I believe that peace is breaking out all over the world and that people are interested in people.”

A political liberal, Kasem narrated a campaign ad for George McGovern's 1972 presidential campaign, hosted fundraisers for Jesse Jackson's presidential campaigns in 1984 and 1988, supported Ralph Nader for US president in 2000, and supported progressive Democrat Dennis Kucinich in his 2004 and 2008 presidential campaigns. Kasem supported a number of other progressive causes, including affordable housing and the rights of the homeless.

Kasem was married to Linda Myers from 1972 to 1979. They had three children: Mike, Julie and Kerri Kasem.

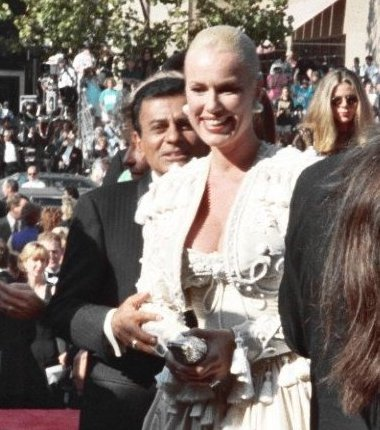
Kasem and his wife Jean at the 1993 Emmy Awards

Kasem was married to actress Jean Thompson from 1980 until his death in 2014. They had one child, Liberty Jean Kasem.

In 1989, Kasem purchased a home built in 1954 and located at 138 North Mapleton Drive in Holmby Hills, Los Angeles, previously owned by developer Abraham M. Lurie, as a birthday present for his wife, Jean. In 2013, Kasem and his wife put the home on the market for US$43 million. After the dueling lawsuits between Kasem family members were settled, the property was re-listed in 2021 for US$37.9 million.

== Illness and death ==
In October 2013, Kerri Kasem announced her father had Parkinson's disease, diagnosed in 2007. However, a few months later, she said he had Lewy body dementia, which is hard to differentiate from Parkinson's. His condition left him unable to speak during his final months.

As Kasem's health worsened in 2013, his wife Jean prevented any contact with him, particularly by his children from his first marriage. On October 1, 2013, the children protested in front of the Kasem home. Some of Kasem's friends and colleagues, and his brother Mouner, joined the protest. The older Kasem children sought conservatorship over their father's care. The court denied their petition in November.

Jean removed Kasem from his Santa Monica, California, nursing home on May 7, 2014. On May 12, 2014, Kerri Kasem was granted temporary conservatorship over her father, despite her stepmother's objection. The court ordered an investigation into Casey Kasem's whereabouts after his wife's attorney told the court that Casey was "no longer in the United States". He was found soon afterward in Washington state.

On June 6, 2014, Kasem was reported to be in critical but stable condition in hospital in Washington state, receiving antibiotics for bedsores and treatment for high blood pressure. It was revealed he had been bedridden for some time. A judge ordered separate visitation times for Kasem's wife and his children from his first marriage. Judge Daniel S. Murphy ruled that Kasem had to be hydrated, fed, and medicated, as a court-appointed lawyer reported on his health status. Jean Kasem claimed he had been given no food, water, or medication the previous weekend. Kerri Kasem's lawyer stated that she had him removed from artificial food and water on the orders of a doctor, and in accordance with a directive her father signed in 2007 saying he would not want to be kept alive if it "would result in a mere biological existence, devoid of cognitive function, with no reasonable hope for normal functioning." Murphy reversed his order the following Monday after it became known that Kasem's body was no longer responding to the artificial nutrition, allowing the family to place Kasem on "end-of-life" measures over the objections of Jean Kasem.

On June 15, 2014, Kasem died at St. Anthony's Hospital in Gig Harbor, Washington, at the age of 82. The immediate cause of death was reported as sepsis caused by an ulcerated bedsore. His body was handed over to his widow. Reportedly, Kasem wanted to be buried at Forest Lawn Memorial Park in Glendale.

By July 19, 2014, a judge had granted Kerri Kasem a temporary restraining order to prevent Jean Kasem from cremating the body in order to allow an autopsy to be performed. However, when Kerri Kasem went to give a copy of the order to the funeral home, she was informed that the body had been moved at the direction of Jean Kasem. Kasem's wife had the body moved to a funeral home in Montreal on July 14, 2014. On August 14, it was reported in the Norwegian newspaper Verdens Gang that Kasem was going to be buried in Oslo.

Jean Kasem had him interred at Oslo Western Civil Cemetery on December 16, 2014, more than six months after his death.

In November 2015, three of Kasem's children and his brother sued his widow for wrongful death. The lawsuit charged Jean Kasem with elder abuse and inflicting emotional distress on the children by restricting access before his death. A 2018 police investigation initiated by a private investigator working for Jean found that he had received appropriate medical care while in Washington, and that there was no evidence pointing to homicide. The suits were settled in 2019.

== Honors ==
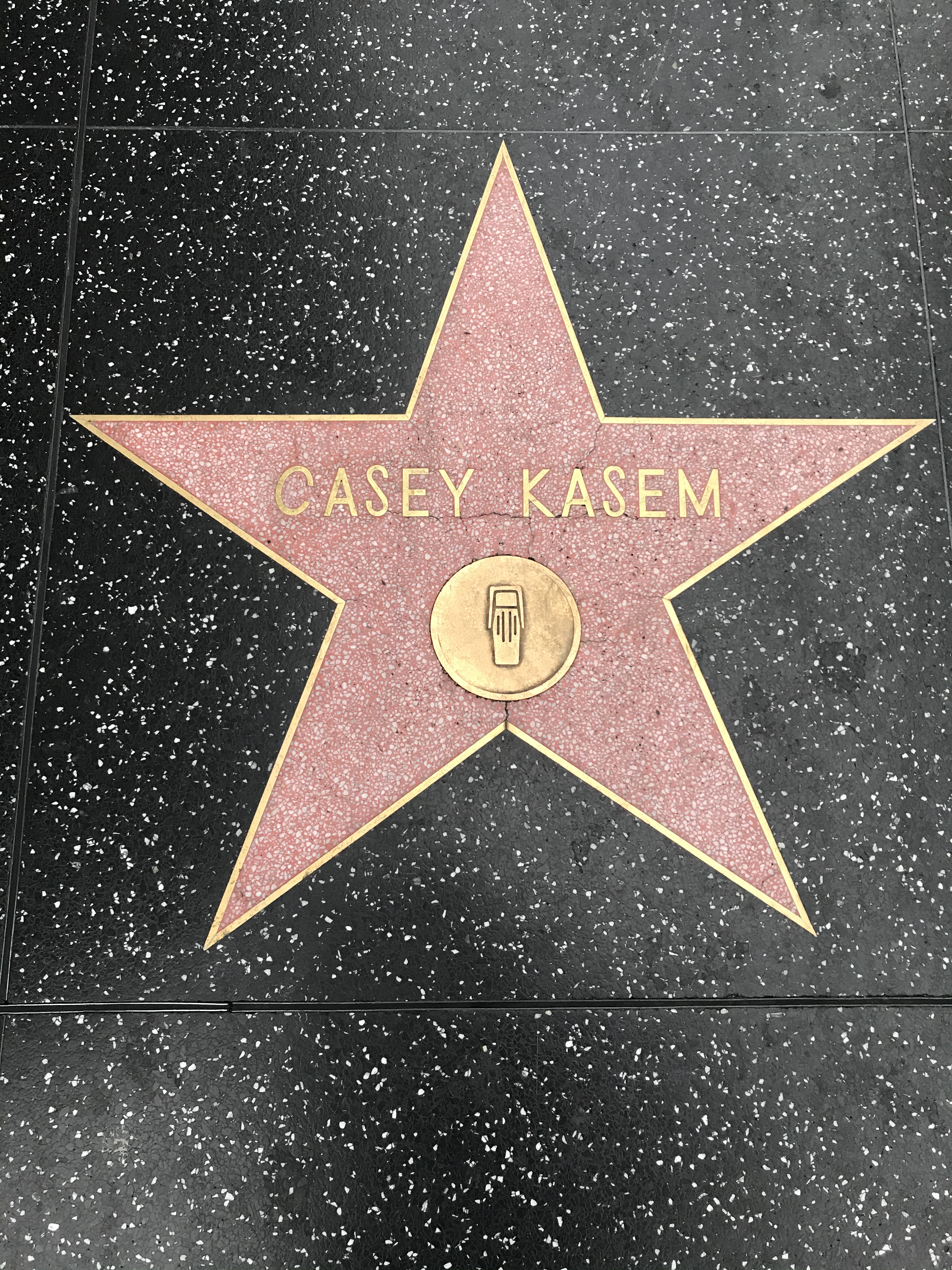
Kasem's Hollywood Star

In 1981, Kasem was granted a star on the Hollywood Walk of Fame. He was inducted into the National Association of Broadcasters Hall of Fame radio division in 1985, and the National Radio Hall of Fame in 1992. Five years later, he received the Radio Hall of Fame's first Lifetime Achievement Award. In 2003, Kasem was given the Radio Icon award at the Radio Music Awards.

== Filmography ==
=== Film ===
Year	Title	Role	Notes
1967	First to Fight	Minor Role	Uncredited
1967	The Glory Stompers	Mouth	
1969	2000 Years Later	Disk Jockey	
1969	Wild Wheels	Knife	
1969	The Cycle Savages	Keeg's Brother	
1969	Scream Free!	Phil	
1970	The Girls from Thunder Strip	Conrad	
1971	The Incredible 2-Headed Transplant	Ken	
1972	Doomsday Machine	Mission Control Officer	
1973	Soul Hustler	Birnie	
1976	The Gumball Rally	Radio D.J. (voice)	
1977	New York, New York	D.J. aka Midnight Bird	
1978	Disco Fever	Brian Parker	
1979	The Dark	Police Pathologist	
1979	Scooby Goes Hollywood	Shaggy Rogers (voice)	TV movie
1980	The Return of the King	Meriadoc 'Merry' Brandybuck, a Hobbit (voice)	TV movie
1984	Ghostbusters	Himself	Cameo
1986	The Transformers: The Movie	Cliffjumper (voice)	
1987	Scooby-Doo Meets the Boo Brothers	Shaggy Rogers (voice)	TV movie
1988	Scooby-Doo and the Ghoul School	Shaggy Rogers / Mirror Monster (voices)	TV movie
1988	Scooby-Doo! and the Reluctant Werewolf	Shaggy Rogers (voice)	TV movie
1994	Scooby-Doo! in Arabian Nights	Shaggy Rogers (voice)	TV movie
1996	Mr. Wrong	Himself	
1997	James Dean: Live Fast, Die Young	Bill Romano	
1999	Undercover Angel	Himself	
2000	Rugrats in Paris: The Movie	Wedding DJ (voice)	
2001	The Comedy Team of Pete & James	Himself (voice)	
2003	Scooby-Doo! and the Legend of the Vampire	Shaggy Rogers (voice)	Direct-to-video
2003	Scooby-Doo! and the Monster of Mexico	Shaggy Rogers (voice)	Direct-to-video
2003	Looney Tunes: Back in Action	Shaggy Rogers (voice)	cameo
2004	Scooby-Doo! and the Loch Ness Monster	Shaggy Rogers (voice)	Direct-to-video
2005	Aloha, Scooby-Doo!	Shaggy Rogers (voice)	Direct-to-video
2005	Scooby-Doo! in Where's My Mummy?	Shaggy Rogers (voice)	Direct-to-video
2006	Scooby-Doo! Pirates Ahoy!	Shaggy Rogers (voice)	Direct-to-video
2007	Chill Out, Scooby-Doo!	Shaggy Rogers (voice)	Direct-to-video
2008	Scooby-Doo! and the Goblin King	Shaggy Rogers (voice)	Direct-to-video
2009	Scooby-Doo! and the Samurai Sword	Shaggy Rogers (voice)	Direct-to-video
2010	Quantum Quest: A Cassini Space Odyssey	Himself (voice)	

=== Television ===
Year	Title	Role	Notes
1964	The Famous Adventures of Mr. Magoo	Additional voices	
1968	Garrison's Gorillas	Provost Marshal	Episode: "The Death Sentence"
1968–1969	The Batman/Superman Hour	Robin / Dick Grayson (voice)	17 episodes
1969–1970	Hot Wheels	Tank Mallory / Dexter Carter (voices)	5 episodes
1969–1971	Cattanooga Cats	Groove, the drummer (voice)	17 episodes
1969–1970	Scooby-Doo, Where Are You!	Shaggy Rogers (voice)	25 episodes
1970	Skyhawks	Steve Wilson, Joe Conway (voices)	Episode: "Devlin's Dilemma"
1970–1971	Josie and the Pussycats	Alexander Cabot III (voice)	16 episodes
1970–1992	Sesame Street	Blue Man in 'Q for Quarter' Cartoon / Fly (voices)	17 episodes
1971	Here Comes Peter Cottontail	Peter Cottontail (voice)	Stop-motion Easter special for Rankin-Bass
1972	Wait Till Your Father Gets Home	George (voice)	Episode: "The Neighbors"
1972–1973	The New Scooby-Doo Movies	Shaggy Rogers, Robin, Alexander Cabot III, Ghost of Injun Joe (voices)	24 episodes
1972	Josie and the Pussycats in Outer Space	Alexander Cabot III (voice)	16 episodes
1973	The Bear Who Slept Through Christmas	Narrator (voice)	Animated Christmas TV special
1973–1985	Super Friends	Robin / Dick Grayson (voices)	109 episodes
1974	The Dean Martin Celebrity Roast	Adolf Hitler	Episode: "The Roast of Don Rickles"
1974	Hong Kong Phooey	Car Stealer, Clown (voices)	2 episodes
1974	Hawaii Five-O	Swift, Freddie Dryden	5 episodes
1974	Emergency +4	Additional voices	12 episodes
1974	Ironside	Lab Technician, Jim Crutcher	2 episodes
1974	The City That Forgot About Christmas	Additional voices	Christmas TV special
1975	The Night That Panicked America	Mercury Theatre Player	TV movie
1975	The Last of the Mohicans	Uncas (voice)	TV movie
1976–1977	Dynomutt, Dog Wonder	Fishface / Swamp Rat / Shaggy Rogers (voices)	5 episodes
1976–1978	The Scooby-Doo Show	Shaggy Rogers (voice)	40 episodes
1976	Freedom Is	Additional voices	TV movie
1977	Police Story	Sobhe	Episode: "Trial Board"
1977	Quincy, M.E.	Sy Wallace	Episode: "An Unfriendly Radiance"
1977	The Hardy Boys/Nancy Drew Mysteries	Paul Hamilton	Episode: "The Mystery of the Hollywood Phantom" (Parts 1 & 2)
1977	Switch	Tony Brock	Episode: "Fade Out"
1977–1978	What's New, Mr. Magoo?	Waldo (voice)	10 episodes
1977–1979	Scooby's All-Star Laff-A-Lympics	Shaggy Rogers / Mr. Creeply (voices)	24 episodes
1977	Soap	Narrator (voice)	Unaired pilot (Kasem left the show before it aired. Narration for the pilot was rerecorded by Rod Roddy before airing.)
1977	Wonderbug	Roscoe	Episode: "The Big Game"
1978	Charlie's Angels	Tom Rogers	Episode: "Winning Is for Losers"
1978	Yogi's Space Race	Additional voices	7 episodes
1978	Jana of the Jungle	Additional voices	13 episodes
1978–1985	Battle of the Planets	Mark (voice)	85 episodes; American dubbed adaptation of anime series Science Ninja Team Gatchaman (in which the character was originally called "Ken the Eagle")
1979	The Flintstones Meet Rockula and Frankenstone	Monty Marble (voice)	Animated Halloween TV special
1979–1980	Scooby-Doo and Scrappy-Doo	Shaggy Rogers (voice)	16 episodes
1980–1982	Scooby-Doo and Scrappy-Doo (1980 TV series)	Shaggy Rogers (voice)	33 episodes
1980–1982	The Richie Rich/Scooby-Doo Show	Shaggy Rogers (voice)	21 episodes
1982	The Scooby & Scrappy-Doo/Puppy Hour	Shaggy Rogers (voice)	13 episodes
1982	The Gary Coleman Show	Additional voices	2 episodes
1983	The New Scooby and Scrappy-Doo Show	Shaggy Rogers / Mr. Rogers / Mrs. Rogers (voices)	13 episodes
1983	Matt Houston	Master of Ceremonies	Episode: "Target: Miss World"
1984	The New Scooby-Doo Mysteries	Shaggy Rogers, Grandpa Rogers (voices)	13 episodes
1984–1985	Scary Scooby Funnies	Shaggy Rogers (voice)	20 episodes
1984–1986	The Transformers	Cliffjumper / Bluestreak / Teletraan I / Dr. Arkeville (voices)	60 episodes
1985	The 13 Ghosts of Scooby-Doo	Shaggy Rogers (voice)	13 episodes
1985–1986	Scooby's Mystery Funhouse	Shaggy Rogers (voice)	21 episodes
1988–1991	A Pup Named Scooby-Doo	Shaggy Rogers / Mr. Rogers (voices)	27 episodes
1989–1991	Saved by the Bell	Himself	Episodes: "Dancing to the Max", "Rockumentary"
1989	Family Feud	Himself	(cameo appearance), "Funny Men vs. Funny Women" Week episode
1989	Hanna-Barbera's 50th: A Yabba Dabba Doo Celebration	Shaggy Rogers (voice)	TV special
1991	Tiny Toon Adventures	Flakey Flakems (voice)	Episode: "Here's Hamton"
1991	Beverly Hills, 90210	Mr. Franklin's Friend	Uncredited, Episode: "Spring Training"
1992–1993	The Ben Stiller Show	Himself	2 episodes
1993	2 Stupid Dogs	Bill Barker (voice)	Episode: "Let's Make a Right Price/One Ton/Far-Out Friday"
1994	Captain Planet and the Planeteers	Lexo Starbuck (voice)	Episode: "You Bet Your Planet"
1996	Sister, Sister	Himself	Episode: "The Audition"
1996	Homeboys in Outer Space	Spacy Kasem	Episode: "Loquatia Unplugged, or Come Back, Little Cyber"
1997	Johnny Bravo	Shaggy Rogers (voice)	Episode: "The Sensitive Male!/Bravo Dooby Doo"
2000	Histeria!	Calgary Kasem (voice)	Episode: "North America"
2002–2006	What's New, Scooby-Doo?	Shaggy Rogers (voice)	42 episodes
2002	Sabrina the Teenage Witch	Shaggy Rogers (voice)	Episode: "Sabrina Unplugged"
2003	Blue's Clues	Radio (voice)	Episode: "Blue's Big Car Trip"
2003	Teamo Supremo	DJ Despicable (voice)	Episode: "Doin' the Supremo!"
2006–2008	Shaggy & Scooby-Doo Get a Clue!	Uncle Albert Shaggleford (voice)	22 episodes
2010−2013	Scooby-Doo! Mystery Incorporated	Colton Rogers (voice)	5 episodes; Final appearance.

=== Video games ===
Year	Title	Role
1995	Scooby-Doo Mystery	Shaggy Rogers
2009	Scooby-Doo's Yum Yum Go!	Shaggy Rogers

=== Theme parks ===
Year	Title	Role	Notes
1990	The Funtastic World of Hanna-Barbera	Shaggy Rogers	Voice

== See also ==
- List of Druze
- List of vegans
- History of the Middle Eastern people in Metro Detroit

Media offices
Preceded by None	American Top 40 Host; 1970–1988	Succeeded by Shadoe Stevens
Preceded by Shadoe Stevens	American Top 40 Host; 1998–2004	Succeeded by Ryan Seacrest
