= Jean Kasem =

American actress (born 1953/54)

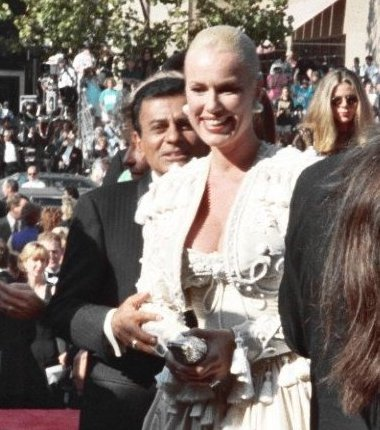
- Jean with husband Casey Kasem on the red carpet at the 45th Annual Primetime Emmy Awards in September 1993
- Born: Jean Thompson; 1953 or 1954 (age 71–72); Portsmouth, New Hampshire, U.S.
- Education: University of Guam
- Occupation: Actress
- Years active: 1982–1999, 2007
- Spouse: Casey Kasem (m. 1980; died 2014)
- Children: 1
- Relatives: Kerri Kasem (stepdaughter); Mike Kasem (stepson)

Jean Thompson Kasem (born 1953 or 1954) is an American former actress. She is the widow of radio personality and actor Casey Kasem.

== Early life ==
Jean Thompson was one of five children born to Irene Celia Thompson and Herbert Owens Thompson Sr. (deceased). She is of Norwegian heritage on her mother's side. She was born in Portsmouth, New Hampshire, where she lived before her civil servant father moved the family to Guam in 1963. She attended the University of Guam at age 16.

== Career ==
After marrying a U.S. Navy lieutenant when she was 17, she left to work as a waitress and saleswoman on U.S. military bases throughout the Pacific Ocean where her husband was posted. The marriage lasted six years.

She relocated to California and unsuccessfully attempted to find work in broadcast journalism. Frustrated, she joined an acting workshop and soon found roles on such TV series as Matt Houston, Fantasy Island and Alice.

Kasem played the recurring role of Loretta Tortelli, the wife of Nick Tortelli (Dan Hedaya) on Cheers and as a cast-member of the short-lived spinoff The Tortellis. She has also worked as voice actor for such animated television series as Darkwing Duck, 2 Stupid Dogs, Shaggy & Scooby-Doo Get a Clue!, Johnny Bravo, and Mother Goose and Grimm.

She made guest appearances in several movies and television shows, including Growing Pains, Cybill, Hunter, Family Feud, Hollywood Squares, My Two Dads, Hope & Gloria and others. She also has a short, but memorable appearance in the original Ghostbusters movie.

She holds twelve patents with the United States Patent and Trademark Office, all pertaining to crib and canopy design, developed for her crib business, Little Miss Liberty Round Crib Company.

== Personal life ==
She was married to radio personality Casey Kasem from 1980 until his death in 2014, and they had one child together, Liberty Jean Kasem.

In 1989, Casey Kasem purchased a house built in 1954, previously owned by developer Abraham M. Lurie, as a birthday present for her.

=== Stepchildren and conservatorship ===
Casey Kasem had three children from a previous marriage: Kerri, Julie, and Mike Kasem. In October 2013, Kerri Kasem said that her father was suffering from Parkinson's disease; a few months later, she said Casey Kasem had been diagnosed with Lewy body dementia, which is often difficult to differentiate from Parkinson's. Owing to his condition, he was no longer able to speak.

On October 1, 2013, Kerri Kasem, her siblings, their uncle (Casey's brother), as well as numerous friends and colleagues protested outside Casey and Jean Kasem's home, saying Jean Kasem had been preventing contact with Casey Kasem for three months. Six days later, Julie Kasem and her husband, Dr. Jamil Aboulhosn, filed a conservatorship petition to place Casey Kasem under their care. The court denied their petition.

On May 12, 2014, Kerri Kasem was granted conservatorship over Jean Kasem's objection. The court ordered an investigation into Casey Kasem's whereabouts, after Jean Kasem's attorney argued the court had no jurisdiction as he was "no longer in the United States," but did not give any information to the court about Kasem's whereabouts. But after Casey was located in Washington state, Kerri Kasem was given custody.

Casey Kasem died on June 15, 2014, aged 82. His widow was given her husband's body for funeral arrangements, and Casey Kasem was buried in the Vestre Gravlund cemetery in Oslo, Norway.

== Filmography ==
Year	Title	Role	Notes
1982	Strike Force	Marlene	Episode: "Lonely Ladies"
1983	Matt Houston	Andrea	Episode: "The Yacht Club Murders"
1983	We Got It Made	Clarisse	Episode: "Mickey Goes Topless"
1983	Alice	Babette	Episode: "It Had to Be Mel"
1984	Fantasy Island	Actress	Episode: "The Awakening of Love/The Imposter"
1984	Ghostbusters	Tall Woman at Party	
1984–1993	Cheers	Loretta Tortelli	6 episodes
1985	Star Fairies	Ture Love (voice)	Television film
1987	The Tortellis	Loretta Tortelli	13 episodes
1989	Growing Pains	DeDe DeWitt	Episode: "Ben and Mike's Excellent Adventure"
1990	Rock Hudson	Madge	
1990	Elliot Fauman, Ph.D.	Meredith Dashley	
1990	Fall from Grace	Palm Springs Realtor	Television film
1990	The Adventures of Don Coyote and Sancho Panda	Additional voices	Episode: "Pity the Poor Pirate"
1990	The New Dragnet	Miss Lamorock	Episode: "Where's My Soup Cans?"
1991	Hunter	Wanda Crebbs	Episode: "Little Man with a Big Reputation"
1991	Perfect Crimes	Sheila	Television film
1991	Darkwing Duck	Additional voices	Episode: "My Valentine Ghoul"
1991	The Story Lady	Sensuous Witch	Television film
1993	2 Stupid Dogs	Female Contestant (voice)	Episode: "Let's Make a Right Price"
1994	Nurses	Jean	Episode: "All the Pretty Caseys"
1994	A Million to Juan	Party Guest	
1994	The 5 Mrs. Buchanans	Frances 'Tink' Larson	Episode: "The Mothers-in-Law"
1995	Hope & Gloria	Candy	Episode: "The Dupree Family Christmas"
1997	Johnny Bravo	Tabitha, Suzy's Mom (voices)	1 episode
1997	Malcolm & Eddie	Nurse L. Reed	Episode: "Whose Room Is It Anyway?"
1998	Buddy Faro	Unknown role	Episode: "Death by Airbrush"
1999	Good vs. Evil	Sitcom Wife	Episode: "To Be or Not to Be Evil"
2007	Shaggy & Scooby-Doo Get a Clue!	Cat Lady (voice)	Episode: "Operation Dog and Hippie Boy"; Final role
