= Toggle Talk =

- Toggle星客驾到
- Genre: Talkshow
- Original languages: Mandarin; English
- No. of episodes: 22

Production
- Running time: approx. 6-15 mins per webisode

Original release
- Network: Toggle
- Release: 4 May – 22 June 2015

Related
- Sabo; Travel SSBD

Toggle Talk (Chinese: Toggle星客驾到) is a Singaporean web series launched in May 2015. It is the first Mandarin web series to be launched on MediaCorp interactive service Toggle, following the closure of xinmsn.

A new season of Toggle Talk started in June 2016, with new episodes every Wednesday.
