= Keery =

Keery is a surname. Notable people with the surname include:

- Joe Keery (born 1992), American actor and musician
- Natalia Keery-Fisher (born 1986), English actress and singer
- Neville Keery (born 1939), Irish poet and politician
- Stan Keery (1931–2013), English footballer

== See also ==
- Kerry (name)
