= Kerry Mitchell =

American artist

Kerry Mitchell (born 1961) is an American artist known for his algorithmic and fractal art, which has been exhibited at the Nature in Art Museum, The Bridges Conference, and the Los Angeles Center for Digital Art, and for his "Fractal Art Manifesto".

== Life ==
Mitchell was born in Iowa, United States, in 1961. His parents were LeRoy and Shirley Mitchell. His father was an art teacher and mother was a stay-at-home mother until Mitchell started seventh grade. Mitchell was a Presidential Scholar in 1979 and went on to pursue engineering at and graduated from Purdue University in aerospace engineering, did a master's degree at Stanford University, and then a PhD work at Purdue. He worked at NASA doing aerospace research. He then worked as a scientist at Arizona Science Center. He served as a mathematics and science professor at the University of Advancing Technology in Tempe, Arizona. As of 2015, he works as a manager at Maricopa County Community College District in Tempe, Arizona.

== Artwork ==
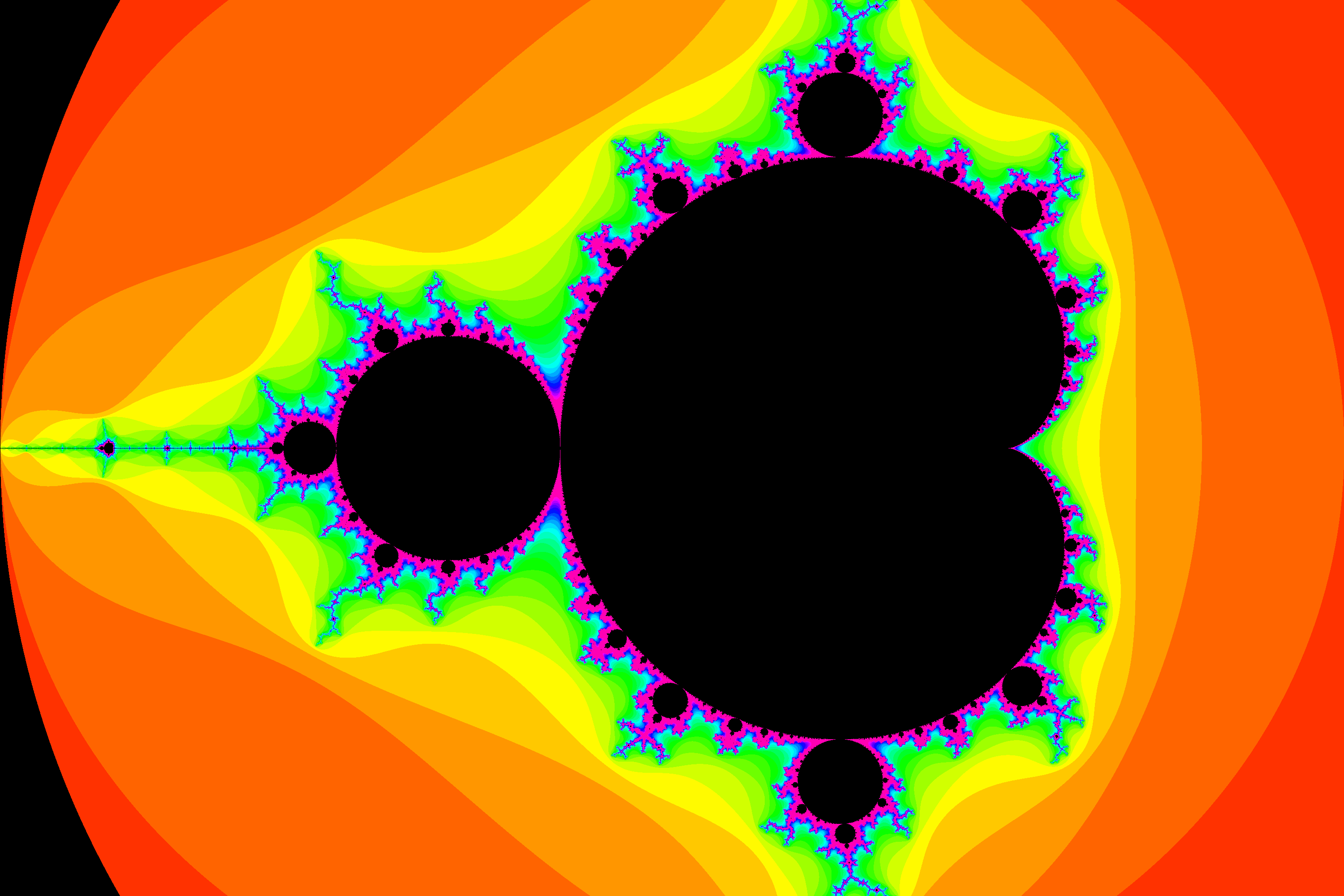
Mitchell was inspired by a 1985 article on the Mandelbrot set.

Alongside his technical career, Mitchell works on algorithmic art. He ascribes his artistic awakening to a 1985 article in Scientific American on the Mandelbrot set, explaining:

Like many others, I was amazed at the beauty that arose from iterating such a simple formula. Unlike most, I had the means and inclination to investigate the process further, which fed both sides of me.

In 1999, Mitchell published his Fractal Art Manifesto. The artist Janet Parke notes that in the manifesto, Mitchell suggests that fractal art cannot be made by a computer alone, and that not everyone who has a computer can necessarily make good fractal art. Instead, she explains, Mitchell is arguing that the artist's creative process is needed to inject elements such as the considered selection of colours and gradients, the merging of multiple layers, and decisions on composition such as by zooming in to a fractal.

Mitchell also prepared tutorials on how to create fractal art with tools including Ultra Fractal. In 2011 he served on the panel of the "Fractal Art Contest".

== Exhibitions, collections ==
- Nature in Art Museum, Gloucestershire, 2007
- The Bridges Conference, 2015
- Los Angeles Center for Digital Art (LACDA), 2015-2016

== Works ==
=== Books ===
- Selected Works (self-published with Lulu.com), 2009. ISBN 978-0-557-08398-5

=== Papers ===
- Fractal Art Manifesto, 1999
- Introduction to Ultra Fractal version 2, 2001
- Using Ultra Fractal as a Drawing Tool, 2001
- Techniques for Artistically Rendering Space-Filling Curves
- A Statistical Investigation of the Area of the Mandelbrot Set, 2001
- Rendering Fractal Images using Photographs, 2001
- Modeling Vortical Flows
- Fractal Tessellations and the Pythagorean Theorem
- Sequences and Patterns Arising from Mancala on an Infinite Board
- Toward a Chaotic World View
- Transcendental Signature Sequences
- Fun with Chaotic Orbits in the Mandelbrot Set
- Spirolateral Images from Integer Sequences
- Fun with Whirls
