= Sabo (web series) =

- Genre: Reality hidden-camera prank show
- Presented by: Mike Kasem
- Original language: English
- No. of episodes: 12

Production
- Executive producer: Tan Ing How
- Producer: Mathilda D'silva
- Running time: approx. 8-16 mins per webisode

Original release
- Network: Toggle
- Release: 6 April – 17 April 2015

Related
- Toggle Talk

Sabo is a Singaporean web series which was launched on 6 April 2015 and hosted by Mike Kasem. It is the first web series to be launched on Mediacorp interactive service Toggle, following the closure of xinmsn. The series is a reality hidden-camera show which pranks Mediacorp artistes and local celebs unsuspectingly.

== Victims ==
Apart from episodes 7 and 9, which are rated PG13, all episodes are rated PG.

No.	Victim	Original release date	Rating
1	Ian Fang	April 6, 2015	PG
2	Daniella Sya	April 13, 2015	PG
3	Shane Pow	April 20, 2015	PG
4	Jayley Woo	April 27, 2015	PG
5	Sonia Chew	May 4, 2015	PG
6	Kimberly Chia	June 29, 2015	PG
7	Jimmy Taenaka	July 5, 2015	PG13 Brief Coarse Language
8	Fandi Ahmad	July 12, 2015	PG
9	Joakim Gomez	July 19, 2015	PG13 Mature Themes
10	Kym Ng	July 26, 2015	PG
11	Chen Hanwei	August 2, 2015	PG
12	Zoe Tay	August 9, 2015	PG
