= Metropia =

Metropia may refer to:

- Metropia (film), a 2009 Swedish animated film
- Metropia (TV series), a Canadian television drama
