= Ciarraige Airtig =

The Ciarraige Airtech were a population-group found in medieval Ireland.

== Origins ==
The Ciarraige Airtech were one of three branches of the Ciarraige located close to each other in central Connacht. They were the Ciarraige Aí, Ciarraige Airtig and Ciarraighe Locha na nÁirne, along the east County Mayo/west-central County Roscommon area. They were thought to have once formed a single over-kingdom which was broken up by the rise of the Uí Briúin in the 8th and 9th centuries.

In 2000, Nollaig Ó Muraíle wrote of them as follows (p.168):

"The most obscure of the (supposed) three branches of Ciarraige Connacht were those of Airtech who are mentioned in the Patrician documents, in the Lebor Gabála Érenn, in the saints' genealogies, and, for the last time, in the early-fourteenth-century annals. Their territory - variously referred to as Crích Airtig and Mag nAirtig - was centred on the parish of Tibohine, baony of Frenchpark (around the present village of Loughglynn), but covered parts of adjacent parishes (including Castlemmore, Kilcolman and Kilnamanagh) in north-west roscommon. Overall, their impact on Connacht history must be adjudged very slight."

== Annalistic references ==
- 1315 - "As for Maelruanaid Mac Diarmata, when he heard that Diarmait Gall had established himself in the seat of dignity of his own family and on the Rock of Loch Key, and that he had been sent to be made king at Cruachan, and when his own cows had been slaughtered in Glenn Fathraim, he marched with his household troops and retainers to the Callow of the Rock and, turning his back to the Shannon, he plundered from that river to Cara, where the eraghts of the Three Ciarraige were assembled with their flocks and herds, namely the Western Ciarraige, the Ciarraige of Mag nAi and the Ciarraige of Airtech; and it is not likely that there was made in that age a fiercer or a more booty-getting attack than this raid." (Annals of Connacht)
