= Los Angeles Center for Digital Art =

American digital artwork gallery

Coordinates: 34.0466829°N 118.2510593°W

The Los Angeles Center for Digital Art (LACDA), established in April 2004, acts as a gallery for the display of digital artworks in Los Angeles, California, United States.

The founder and director of the gallery is Rex Bruce. The first LACDA venue was on Melrose Avenue, Hollywood, using space at RBC Studios. In February 2011, LACDA moved to 102 West 5th Street in Los Angeles, at the former location of Bert Green Fine Art, which moved to Chicago. Artists such as Andy Lomas and Kerry Mitchell have exhibited at LACDA.
