= Ciarraige Aí =

The Ciarraige Aí were a population-group found in medieval Ireland.

== Origins ==
Four branches of the Ciarraige were known to be located in Connacht. Ciarraige Óic Bethra were located in what was then the kingdom of Aidhne (now south County Galway), where they were one of the three peoples living in Aidhne prior to the arrival of the Uí Fiachrach in the 6th century.

Ciarraige Aí, Ciarraige Airtig and Ciarraighe Locha na nÁirne, were located further north, adjacent to each other along the east County Mayo/west-central County Roscommon area. They were thought to have once formed a single over-kingdom which was broken up by the rise of the Uí Briúin in the 8th and 9th centuries.

In 2000, Nollaig Ó Muraíle wrote of them as follows (p. 165):

"The most notable of the latter are Ciarraige Aí, also called Ciarraige Maige Aí, who obviously derive their designation from the great central plain of Roscommon, Mag nAí, in which the ancient 'capital' of Connacht, Cruachu, stood. Their settlement in contiguity to such a significant royal site must surely bespeak their possessing a considerable status at some stage just over the historical horizon. They first appear in the annals towards the close of the eighth century when, in 796, the Annals of Ulster record the death of Duinechaid ua Daire, whom it describes as 'dux Ciarraide'; this is expanded by the Four Masters to 'tighearna Ciarraighe Aí' and the latter also tells of the death in the same year of Fogartach mac Cathail who is termed 'tighearna Maighe Aí' ... The title used by the Four Masters ('lord of Mag nAí') is indicative of the struggle for control of this crucial territory between the Ciarraige of the area and the rising dynastic power of the Uí Briúin."

== Annalistic references ==
- 791 – "Duineachaidh Ua Daire, lord of Ciarraighe Aei, died." (Annals of the Four Masters)
- 845 – "Connmhach, son of Cethernach, half chief of Ciarraighe, died."
- 997 – "An army was led by Maelseachlainn into Connaught; and he plundered or burned Magh-Aei, and the son of the lord of Ciarraighe was lost by them."
- 1315 – "As for Maelruanaid Mac Diarmata, when he heard that Diarmait Gall had established himself in the seat of dignity of his own family and on the Rock of Loch Key, and that he had been sent to be made king at Cruachan, and when his own cows had been slaughtered in Glenn Fathraim, he marched with his household troops and retainers to the Callow of the Rock and, turning his back to the Shannon, he plundered from that river to Cara, where the eraghts of the Three Ciarraige were assembled with their flocks and herds, namely the Western Ciarraige, the Ciarraige of Mag nAi and the Ciarraige of Airtech; and it is not likely that there was made in that age a fiercer or a more booty-getting attack than this raid." (Annals of Connacht)
