= Ultra Fractal =

- Ultra Fractal 4 on Windows XP
- Original author(s): Frederik Slijkerman
- Developer(s): Frederik Slijkerman
- Initial release: February 8, 1999; 26 years ago
- Stable release: 6.06 / 9 February 2024; 13 months ago
- Operating system: Windows, macOS
- Available in: English, German, Spanish
- Type: Fractal Renderer
- License: Proprietary
- Website: www.ultrafractal.com

Ultra Fractal is a fractal generation and rendering software application. The program was the first publicly available fractal software which featured layering methods previously only found in image editing software. Because of this, the program has become popular for use in the creation of fractal art.

Ultra Fractal is commercial software, but an evaluation version is freely available. The unregistered version creates watermarked renders.

== Features ==
Ultra Fractal is raster based. The program works using a similar paradigm to Photoshop, allowing multiple layers to be combined using layer blending modes, transformations, and custom fractal formulas. Fractal formulas, coloring algorithms, and transformations may be written by users, and a large number of such formula files are available in a public formula database. Fractals may be copied from the interface and pasted as plain text into an email. There is a busy mailing list on which many users post their parameter sets.

Calculation using arbitrary precision arithmetic is supported, allowing users to zoom to a magnification of 10^{4000}.

The GUI is customizable with a dockable MDI. The software calculates statistics about the fractal that is being previewed. Other features include fullscreen mode, color cycling, a render queue, distributed rendering calculations, and a detailed help file. Version 4 added support for animations and improved flame fractal rendering.

Formulae from Fractint, an early and widely used piece of fractal-generating software, have been converted to an UltraFractal formula file.

Example of a multi-layered fractal made with Ultra Fractal

Zoom animation

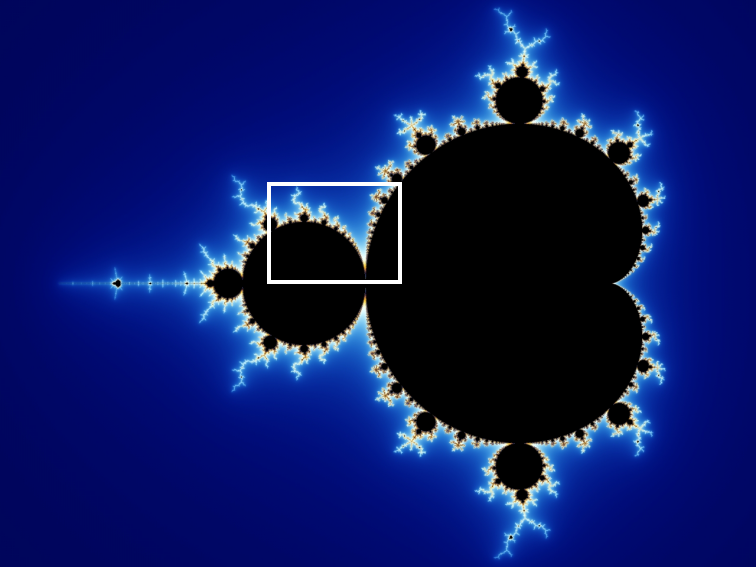
Selection box

== See also ==
- Computer art
- Graphic art software
