= The Bridges Organization =

Organization concerned with mathematics and art

- Formation: 1998
- Founder: Reza Sarhangi
- Headquarters: Kansas
- Location: United States
- President: George W. Hart
- Website: bridgesmathart.org

The Bridges Organization is a non-profit organization that was founded in Kansas, United States, in 1998 with the goal of promoting interdisciplinary work in mathematics and art. The Bridges Conference is an annual conference on connections between art and mathematics. The conference features papers, educational workshops, an art exhibition, a mathematical poetry reading, and a short movie festival.

== List of Bridges conferences ==
Year	Place
1998	Southwestern College, Winfield, Kansas, United States
1999	Southwestern College, Winfield, Kansas, United States
2000	Southwestern College, Winfield, Kansas, United States
2001	Southwestern College, Winfield, Kansas, United States
2002	Towson University, Towson, Maryland, United States
2003	University of Granada, Granada, Spain
2004	Southwestern College, Winfield, Kansas, United States
2005	Banff Centre, Banff, Alberta, Canada
2006	University of London, London, England
2007	University of the Basque Country, Spain
2008	Stenden University, Netherlands
2009	Banff Centre, Banff, Alberta, Canada
2010	Pécs, Hungary
2011	University of Coimbra, Coimbra, Portugal
2012	Towson University, Towson, Maryland, United States
2013	Enschede, Netherlands
2014	Gwacheon National Science Museum, Gwacheon, South Korea
2015	University of Baltimore, Baltimore, United States
2016	University of Jyväskylä, Jyväskylä, Finland
2017	University of Waterloo, Waterloo, Canada
2018	National Museum of Science and Technology, Stockholm, Sweden
2019	Johannes Kepler University, Linz, Austria
2020	Virtual Conference
2021	Virtual Conference
2022	Aalto University, Helsinki and Espoo, Finland
2023	Dalhousie University, Halifax, Nova Scotia, Canada
2024	Virginia Commonwealth University, Richmond, Virginia
2025	Eindhoven University of Technology, Eindhoven
2026	University of Galway, Galway, Ireland
