= Kerry Joyce =

- Born: 1952 (age 73–74); Boston, Massachusetts
- Citizenship: American
- Education: North Carolina School of the Arts / New York University
- Occupation: Interior Design / Product Designer
- Organization: Kerry Joyce Associates / Kerry Joyce Textiles / Kerry Joyce Atelier

Kerry Joyce is an interior designer, designer of houses and product designer. He directs the firm Kerry Joyce Associates, which is located in Los Angeles California. In addition to his line of furniture, lighting, rug and textile designs, Joyce's firm has worked on a wide variety of residential interior design projects.

Joyce was born in Boston, Massachusetts. He attended North Carolina School of the Arts in Winston-Salem and earned a bachelor's degree in scenery and lighting design for the theatre from New York University School of the Arts. His first monograph, Kerry Joyce - The Intangible was published by Pointed Leaf Press in 2018.

Awards

- Emmy Award
- Elle Decor's A-List
- 1stDib 50 Award
- Hollywood Reporter's Design Hall of Fame
- CA Home & Design - Design Master
- Elle Decor's American Design Award for Textiles

Product Design

- Kerry Joyce Atelier Furniture Collection
- Lighting Collection for Palmer Hargrave
- Rug Collection for Mansour Modern
- Kerry Joyce Textiles

His design work has been featured in these publications:

- Architectural Digest
- Robb Report
- Elle Decor
- Forbes
- House Beautiful
- House & Garden
- Milieu Magazine
- New York Times
- Traditional Home
- Veranda
- Vogue
- World of Interiors
