= Kerry LaiFatt =

Canadian actress

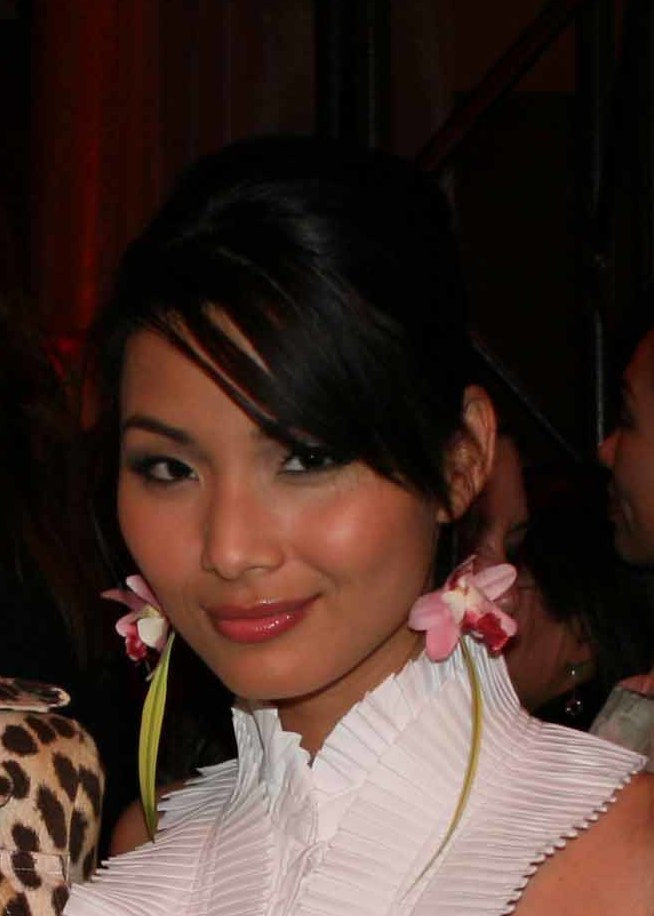
- Kerry Lai Fatt
- Born: 1979 (age 46–47); Burlington, Ontario, Canada
- Education: Ryerson University (now Toronto Metropolitan University)
- Occupations: Actress, Model
- Years active: 2004-present

Kerry LaiFatt (born 1979) is a Canadian actress.

LaiFatt was born in Burlington, Ontario, but lived in Jamaica for the first four years of her life. Kerry attended Ryerson University in Toronto specializing in Fashion Design.

== Career ==
LaiFatt was the host of All X-Treme (Global Television) and Inner City Soul (Firewatch Films) in 2003. Her television credits include Mutant X, Relic Hunter, Falcon Beach, The Dresden Files and Living in Your Car. Her most notable roles are Phoenix on Metropia and Julie Cordry on Paradise Falls.
