= Ciarraige Locha na nÁirne =

Branch of Ciarraighe people located in County Mayo, Ireland

The Ciarraighe Locha na nÁirne were a branch of the Ciarraighe people, located in what is now central-east County Mayo in Connacht.

== Origins ==
The three Ciarraige of Connacht – Ciarraige Áei, Ciarraige Airtig and Ciarraighe Locha na nÁirne – were thought to have once formed a single over-kingdom which was broken up by the rise of the Ui Briuin in the 8th and 9th centuries.

Ciarraighe Locha na nÁirne was located in the barony of Costello in east County Mayo.

== Descendants ==
The leading dynasty of the Ciarraige Locha na nAirne had by the 12th century adopted the surname Ó Céirín. It is now anglicised as Kerin, Kerins, Kearn, Kerrane and Carey (although this is just one of many possible origins for this name) among other spellings. A branch settled in Clare in the early 15th century, there is also a branch in Kerry.

== Annalistic references ==
- 1155 - "Fiacha, son of Cethearnach Ua Ceirin, lord of Ciarraighe-Locha-na-nairneadh, died."
- 1210 - "Donnchadh Cairbrech O'Briain, with his army, and Geoffroi Mareis, with his army of the Foreigners of Mumha, and Aedh, son of Ruaidhri O'Conchobhair, and the son of O'Flaithbhertaigh along with them, proceeded into Connacht..., from thence to Loch-na-nairne, in Ciarraighe, where they committed great depredations; and they were a fortnight, or nearly twenty nights, in Ciarraighe, and the Connachtmen before them."
- 1224 - "Mathghamhain O'Ceirín, king of Ciarraige Locha na nAirne died this year."
- 1266 - "Mathgamain son of Ceithernach, king of Ciarraige, was killed by the Galls of Dunmore this year. "
- 1315 - "The eraghts of the Three Ciarraige were assembled with their flocks and herds, namely the Western Ciarraige, the Ciarraige of Mag nAi and the Ciarraige of Airtech."
- 1315 - "Cormac Mac Ceithernaig, king of the Ciarraige fell,... along with Ruaidri, King of Connacht."
