= Abraham M. Lurie =

American real estate developer

- Born: 1923; Iowa, U.S.
- Died: 2010 (aged 86–87)
- Education: B.A. Ohio State University; J.D. UCLA School of Law
- Occupation: real estate developer
- Known for: development of Marina del Rey
- Spouses: Claire Devera (m. 1947; div. 1981) Katherine Lurie (m. 1983)
- Children: 4

Abraham M. Lurie (1923 – June 29, 2010) was an American real estate developer who was behind the development of much of Marina del Rey.

== Biography ==
Lurie was born to a Jewish family in Iowa in 1923. He had two siblings: Dr. William Lurie and Bertha Lurie Friedman. He graduated with a B.A. in accounting from Ohio State University. In 1948 he moved to California, with his wife Devera (Feldman) Lurie, where he worked as a certified public accountant and attended the UCLA School of Law. In 1957, he passed the bar exam.

== Career ==
He founded Real Property Management which was the single largest developer of the city of Marina del Rey. In 1953, the Los Angeles County Board of Supervisors authorized a $2 million loan to fund the construction of the marina and on April 10, 1965 the Marina was completed. Soon after, the County solicited bids for its development. In 1968, Lurie purchased a 60-year lease from Los Angeles County which gave him the right to build on 20 percent of the land. He went on to build three hotels, two apartment complexes, 1,000 boat slips, and several shopping centers, offices, restaurants; his holdings also included the last undeveloped piece of waterfront land in Marina del Rey.

After having cash flow problems Lurie sold a 49.9% interest in 1989 in his Marina holdings to Saudi billionaire Abdul Aziz Al-Ibrahim (brother of Waleed bin Ibrahim Al Ibrahim and brother-in-law of King Fahd of Saudi Arabia) and several other unnamed foreign investors, forming Marina International Properties Ltd. The transaction was approved by the Los Angeles County Board of Supervisors despite not disclosing the identity of the investors and included the Marina Beach, Marina International and Marina del Rey hotels, the Admiralty and Islander apartments, Fisherman's Village, Pier 44, Marina Beach Shopping Center and Marina West office complex. The partnership required additional funds and in late 1990, an agreement was reached for Al-Ibrahim to buy out Lurie's interest but the deal soon fell apart and Al-Ibrahim sued to dissolve the partnership. This caused $50 million in loans from four separate banks to default. Al-Ibrahim accused Lurie of fraud, diversion of funds, and the failure of providing adequate financial reporting; and asked the judge to give him control of the Marina holdings. Lurie counter-sued accusing Al-Ibrahim of withholding funds that were required to be transferred under the partnership putting the solvency of Marina International Properties Ltd. at risk. Lurie was unsuccessful in finding outside investors who did not want to wade into the middle of a lawsuit with a deep-pocketed and connected Saudi and petitioned the court to allow him to sell some of the leases without Al-Ibrahim's approval to pay off his bankers. The court refused and Marina International Properties Ltd filed for bankruptcy. The lawsuit was ultimately won by Al-Ibrahim who took over control of the partnership and settled the then $140 million in debt outstanding.

== Personal life ==
In 1947, he married Claire Devera (later Waldman); they divorced in 1981. In 1983, he married Katherine Lurie. He had two children: Leslie Beck, Scott Lurie, and two step children, Donald Schneider and Thomas Carlyle. He has 5 grandchildren and 9 great grandchildren.

=== Death ===
He died on June 29, 2010; services were held at Mount Sinai Memorial Park Cemetery in Hollywood Hills, Los Angeles.
