= Kerri Kasem =

American radio personality (born 1972)

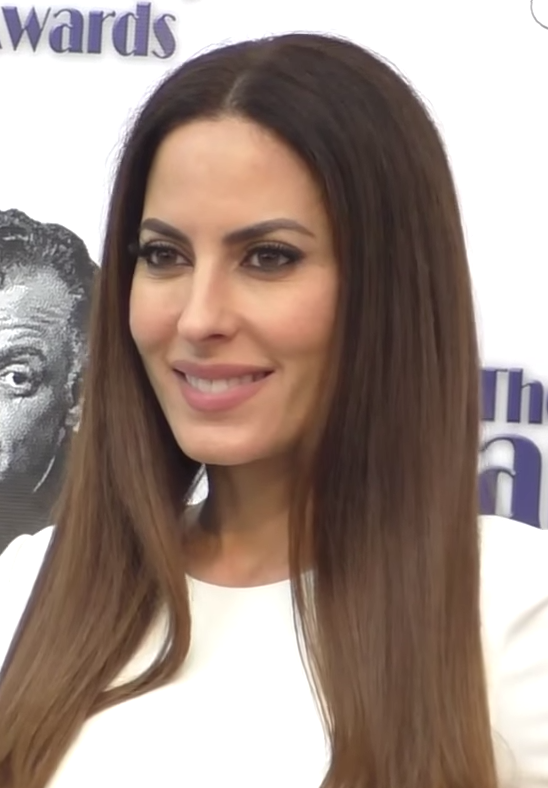
- Kasem at the Carney Awards in 2016
- Born: Carrie H. Kasem; July 12, 1972 (age 54); Los Angeles, California, U.S.
- Occupations: Radio and television personality
- Years active: 1993–present
- Father: Casey Kasem
- Relatives: Mike Kasem (brother)
- Website: kerrikasem.com

Kerri Kasem (born Carrie H. Kasem, July 12, 1972) is an American radio host. She hosted the nationally syndicated Sixx Sense and The Side Show Countdown With Nikki Sixx from February 2010 to April 2014. Kasem later became a judge on Who Will Rock You, alongside Dee Snider of the heavy metal band Twisted Sister.

== Early life ==
Kasem was born in Los Angeles, California. She and her siblings Mike and Julie are the three children of radio personality Casey Kasem and his first wife, Linda Myers, to whom he was married from 1972 to 1979.

== Career ==
Kasem was co-host with Alan Stock on KXNT 840 AM in Las Vegas for a morning radio talk show. She left KXNT in August 2007. She hosted the nationally syndicated Sixx Sense and The Side Show Countdown with Nikki Sixx from February 2010 to April 2014. Other radio shows on which she worked include Racing Rocks the National Lampoon Comedy Countdown, The Solomon Free Money Hour, and Pet Talk. In 2003, she was a reality television show contestant on ESPN's Beg, Borrow & Deal. She has appeared on the E! channel, and is a host on UFC and on Sí TV's The Rub. She later became a co-host, with Alan Gurvey, on Gurvey's Law on KABC.

Kasem appeared on The Dr. Oz Show on October 12, 2021, talking about the death of her father Casey Kasem.

== Personal life ==
Kasem is founder of Kasem Cares and the Kasem Coalition, both created to raise awareness of elder abuse. In 2014, Kasem won conservatorship over her father when the court found his second wife, Jean Kasem, put his life in danger.

Kerri Kasem has been a Volunteer Minister of the Church of Scientology and participated in the church's missionary and aid program in Haiti during the 2010 Haiti earthquake crisis and in Texas when Hurricane Harvey hit.

In the 1990s, Kasem had a relationship with actor Corey Feldman. The two have remained friends with Kasem appearing in Feldman's 2020 documentary My Truth: The Rape of 2 Coreys and discussing the toxic environment on Dancing With The Stars on a podcast in 2025.

In 2024, Kasem was reported to be in a relationship with former Sixx:A.M. and Guns N' Roses guitarist DJ Ashba.
