= Mike Kasem =

American television actor, and radio DJ

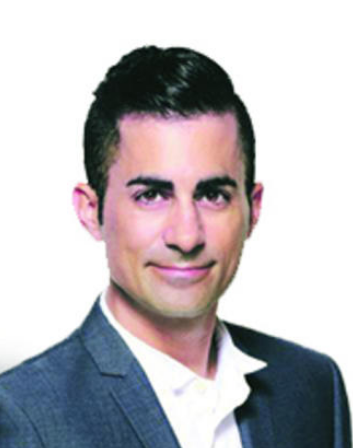
- Born: Michael C. Kasem; August 24, 1973 (age 53); Los Angeles County, California, U.S.
- Occupations: Television presenter; actor; radio DJ
- Years active: 1994–present
- Notable work: Gold 905FM
- Spouse: Su Ann Heng (m. 2019; sep. 2023)
- Children: 1
- Father: Casey Kasem
- Relatives: Kerri Kasem (sister)

Michael C. Kasem (born August 24, 1973) is an American television presenter, actor and radio personality based in Singapore. He is on Mediacorp Radio's Gold 905FM Homestretch with Mike Kasem.

== Early life and family ==
Born in Los Angeles County, California, Kasem is the son of the American disc jockey and radio personality Casey Kasem and his first wife, Linda Myers. Kasem has two sisters, Julie and radio and television personality Kerri Kasem.

== Career ==
=== Television presenter ===
After moving to Singapore sometime in the 1990s, Kasem began his career as an MTV VJ on MTV Asia from 1994 to 1999 hosting MTV Asia Hitlist, MTV Jams, MTV Alternative Nation and MTV Most Wanted. He has hosted/presented and acted in numerous TV show's for Mediacorp Channel 5 and is currently a full-time employee of Mediacorp in Singapore. Kasem along with former radio show co-host Jean Danker hosted the Singapore 2016 New Year's Eve Countdown Show.

=== Actor ===
Kasem's acting debut was in the Mediacorp Channel 5 drama series Triple Nine in December 1998, guest starring as Sergeant Patrick Fernandez.

He made his film acting debut in 2014 in the feature film Afterimages, playing the character Harrison. Kasem also starred in the 2015 period drama movie 1965.

=== Radio DJ ===
Mike Kasem started his Singapore radio career in 2011 when he joined Mediacorp Radio's Class 95FM co-hosting with Jean Danker. He later moved to Mediacorp Radio's Gold 905FM co-hosting the morning drive time show The Mike & Joe Xperiment with Joe Augustin. In 2016, Kasem paired with Vernetta Lopez to co-host the morning drive-time show Live with Mike & Vernetta on Gold 905FM. As of 2026, he hosts the Homestretch.

== Personal life ==
Kasem married Singaporean television presenter, former professional golfer and LIV Golf commentator Su Ann Heng in 2019 after three years of dating. The couple had a son on June 25, 2020. In June 2023, Heng announced on Instagram that the couple were separating.

== Filmography ==
| Year | Title | Role | Note | Ref |
|---|---|---|---|---|
| 1998 | Triple Nine | Sergeant Patrick Fernandez | | |
| 2015 | Sabo | Host | | |
| 2015 | 1965 | Raj | | |
