= Cíarraige =

Early historic population-group in Ireland

The Cíarraige were a population-group recorded in the early historic era in Ireland.

== Origins ==
The word Ciarraige means the people of Ciar. Ciar was the illegitimate son of Fergus, the King of Ulster. After being banished from the Court of Cruachan, Ciar sought refuge in Munster. There he gained the territory for the first branch of Ciarraige, which he called Ciarraige Luachra.

== Branches ==
The Cíarraige were a people found scattered over much of Ireland. Known branches were:

- Ciarraige Luachra, who gave their name to County Kerry
- Ciarraige Altraige, Mocu Alti, or Altai; living around Tralee, northwest of county Kerry.
- Ciarraige Cuirche, the barony of Kerrycurrihy, County Cork
- Ciarraige Diurgi, located somewhere in Munster
- Ciarraige Irluachra, located close to the Ciarraige Luchra in western Sliabh Luachra
- Ciarraige Sleibe Cua, in what is now County Waterford
- Ciarraige Muman, situated in Munster
- Ciarraige Choinchenn, location uncertain
- Ciarraige Conmed, location uncertain
- Ciarraige Maige Glas, northeast part of Maigh Ai in Moylurg, north County Roscommon.
- Ciarraige Des Cechair, location uncertain (possibly in Tethba, now in County Longford)
- Ciarraige Oic Bethra, of Aidhne, now south County Galway
- Ciarraige Aí, based on the plain of Magh nAi in County Roscommon
- Ciarraige Airtech, an obscure branch of the above, around Tibohine, County Roscommon
- Ciarraige Loch Airned, based around Loch Airned, now Mannin Lake, County Mayo, close to the Roscommon border.

== Notable people ==
- St Brendan the Navigator

== See also ==
- Conmhaicne
