= Xinmsn =

xinmsn
- The logo of xinmsn
- Website type: News/Entertainment
- Available in: English, Chinese (Simplified)
- Dissolved: March 2015; 11 years ago
- Owner: Microsoft/MediaCorp
- Editor: MediaCorp
- Website: xin.msn.com
- Commercial: Yes
- Registration: Optional
- Launched: March 2010; 16 years ago
- Current status: Closed
- Written in: ASP.NET

xinmsn was an Internet portal featuring various news and entertainment information for Singapore-based users. It was launched in March 2010 as a joint venture between MediaCorp and Microsoft, and replaces the old iteration of MSN Singapore.

Since 1 April 2015, all operations on xinmsn have ceased. Content has been moved to Toggle and the relaunched MSN Singapore.

== Content ==
xinmsn provided various types of information and news within the context of Singapore. Some of the content provided were:

- Local, regional and world news
- Entertainment news
- Weather information
- Catch-up TV (a service that allows viewers to browse and watch certain television programmes that they have missed)
- Live radio
- "Interactive" drama (a service for viewers to view drama shows shown only on xinmsn and vote on how the plot progresses)

The site also provided some information about the respective television and radio channels owned by MediaCorp.
