= Gina Grad =

American actress

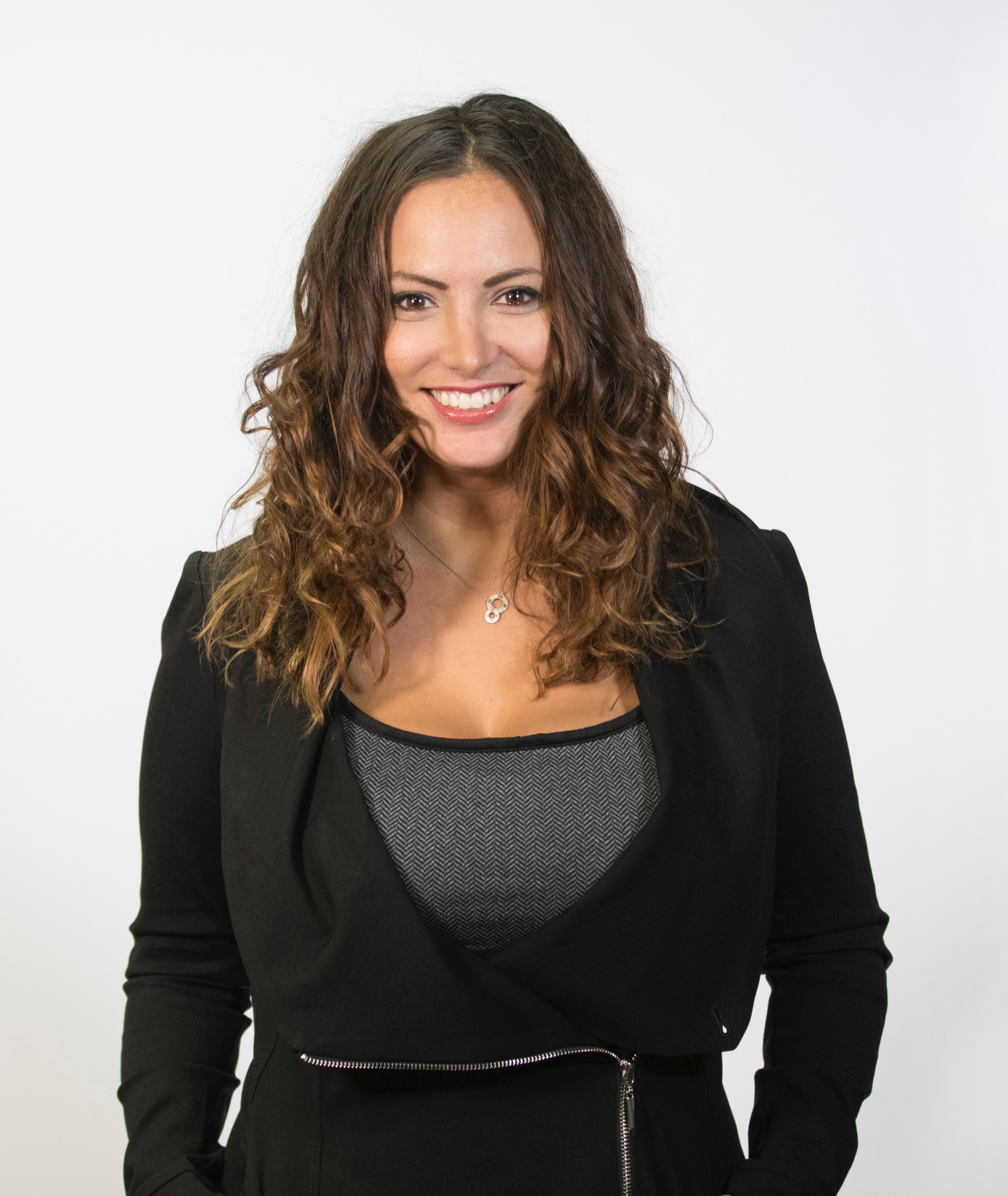
- Born: Gina Grad; May 1, 1978 (age 48); Overland Park, Kansas, U.S.
- Education: University of Kansas
- Employer: The Adam Carolla Show

Gina Grad (born May 1, 1978) is an American radio personality and voice-over artist in the United States. She hosted "Andy and Gina in the Morning" weekdays on KSWD 100.3 The Sound and co-hosted The Adam Carolla Show.

== Early life and education ==
Grad grew up in Overland Park, Kansas, where she attended, and subsequently graduated from, Shawnee Mission South High School, and attended the University of Kansas. Gina's father was longtime sportscaster Steve Grad, who worked for Los Angeles news radio station KNX-1070 from 2006 to 2016.

== Career ==
Grad started at the now-defunct 97.1FM KLSX in November 2006 as an overnight phone screener until landing a job on the Conway and Whitman Show (later renamed The Tim Conway Jr. Show) as producer, phone screener, nightly news girl and fill-in co-host.

After KLSX flipped formats from talk to music (97.1 KAMP) in February 2009, Tim Conway Jr., Brian Whitman, former KLSX producer and board-op Randy Wang (Ryan Wong) and Grad started a short-lived podcast called "The Bobsled". When that ended, Gina and Randy started "The Pretty Good Podcast" which aired daily weekdays from May 2009 to February 2015. The show was later shortened to "The PGP". They took another version of their show, "The Gina and Randy Show" to Frank Kramer's Toad Hop Network, which was recorded at his home studio, then at the former Jon Lovitz Comedy Club at Universal City Walk.

Grad took a job at KFI am640 in November 2009 producing Gary Hoffmann's Sunday morning show and fill-in producing for the Bill Handel Show. She also helped launch The Bill Carroll Show as associate producer and "stunt girl," as well as guest-hosting for The John and Ken Show with her podcast co-host Randy Wang.

Grad also made regular appearances on The Young Turks online news network between 2013 and 2015, presenting news stories and weighing in as a guest panelist on "The Main Show," The Point with Ana Kasparian and The Rubin Report with Dave Rubin.

In February 2015, Grad began on the now-defunct 100.3FM 'The Sound' KSWD (First as co-host of Mark in the Morning with Mark Thompson of "Mark and Brian" fame and then hosted the music-intensive morning show "Andy and Gina in the Morning" with co-host Andy Chanley). A couple of months after starting at her job at 'The Sound', she joined The Adam Carolla Show, joining Bryan Bishop, covering the news and serving as co-host. She and Bishop left the program in January 2023. Now that 100.3 The Sound is defunct, Grad no longer hosts a morning radio program, although in 2020 she returned to LA radio as news anchor for The Tim Conway Jr. Show.

With Teresa Strasser, Grad hosted a podcast Easy Listening With Gina and Teresa on PodcastOne from April 2019 to Nov 2023.

Gina now is a permanent member of The Woody Show on Alt 98.7.

=== Voice over ===
Grad is known in the video gaming community for voicing Rose in Street Fighter IV and Street Fighter V. She has also voiced games and series like Syndicate, Technolyze, Paranoia Agent, Ergo Proxy, Connected and Valkyrie Profile 2: Silmeria.

=== Awards ===
Grad received the 2016 Reelworld Rising Star Award and is the 2017 recipient of the Excellence in Radio Award through the Alliance for Women in Media.

== Personal ==
Grad is Jewish and was raised as a conservative. On September 26, 2021, Grad married LA writer and producer Andy Harris.

In early 2016, Grad teamed up with a representative from The Hugging Angels Foundation by spearheading an on-air campaign to help a teenage girl battling Stage 3 Hodgkin's Lymphoma attend her dream prom.
