= The Adam Carolla Show =

The Adam Carolla Show is a talk show led by comedian and television/radio personality Adam Carolla, and may refer to:

- The Adam Carolla Show (radio program), a show that ran in radio syndication between January 2006 and February 2009
- The Adam Carolla Show (podcast), a later version of the show that began on February 23, 2009, and is released each weekday in podcast format
