= Brian Whitman =

American actor

- Born: Brian David Whitman; August 17, 1972 (age 54); Staten Island, New York, U.S.
- Education: Wagner College
- Occupations: Talk show/radio host, voice actor, comedian
- Years active: 1986-present
- Known for: Conway and Whitman

Brian David Whitman (born August 17, 1972) is an American talk radio host and voice impressionist. Whitman was born on Staten Island, New York and graduated from Wagner College in May 1994 with a Bachelor of Arts degree in political science. Brian attended New York City Public High School and graduated from Tottenville High School in January, 1990.

== Career ==
=== Early radio years: 1986–2005 ===
Whitman's start in radio came in 1986, at age 13, when Radio Legend Scott Shannon, then morning host and Program Director at New York's powerhouse Z-100 took note of Whitman's abilities. According to Brian, he called into the popular "Z-100 Morning Zoo" show doing impressions of Ronald Reagan and Rodney Dangerfield. Shannon invited him to the radio station to be a co-host for the morning.

"That was it," Whitman has said. "On that morning, I decided what I wanted to do for a living. I owe it all to Scott. Scott even sent a limousine to my Mom and Dad's home on Staten Island and I was paid $100 for my performance on the air. This is why I hold up June 20, 1986 as the beginning of my career."

Brian's first radio job out of college was doing a fun afternoon show for his friend and program director Glenn Beck. Glenn and Pat Gray did mornings on Top 40 music station KC101 in Connecticut and Whitman commuted daily from Staten Island to Hamden, CT to do afternoon drive. Just weeks later, Brian got an offer he had to take.

He was hired by KKBH 102.9 The Beach in San Diego at 22 years old to host morning drive! KKBH, owned by Gannett had a great relationship with Brian Whitman after his five years of contributions to their LA powerhouse The Rick Dees In The Morning Show on KIIS FM. 102.9 The Beach - which played "The Greatest Hits of the 70's" featured songs older than Brian! After a year, Whitman was hired by San Diego's legendary rock station, 101 KGB FM, to host the morning show. His on-air partner and producer was his former KKBH Program Director (and his future boss at KLSX in Los Angeles) Jack Silver. "The Brian and Jack Show" wrapped up in early 1997, when Whitman accepted a job offer from WABC in New York.

From 1991 to 2005, Whitman served as the resident funny voice guy and comedic performer and writer on both The Rick Dees & Ryan Seacrest Morning Shows on KIIS FM in Los Angeles. He resigned both KIIS and ABC Radio to join CBS Radio's KLSX FM in June, 2005. He operated his own national radio comedy service providing celebrity impressions, original characters and comedy bits to hundreds of stations nationwide beginning in 1991. Stations included WPLJ-FM and WABC-AM in New York, WLUP-FM in Chicago, KIOI-FM in San Francisco, WEGX-FM in Philadelphia and WHYI-FM in Miami, as well as syndicated shows including The Sean Hannity Show, The Glenn Beck Program, The Mike Gallagher Show and The Stephanie Miller Show.

In 2000, Whitman was the morning host for a nationally syndicated comedy radio network (that also provided an ahead-of-its-time internet audio and video stream) called Comedy World. At Los Angeles based Comedy World he kicked off a programming lineup that included comedians Craig Shoemaker and Bobby Slayton.

Whitman's uncanny celebrity impressions have fooled mainstream media and others. In the 90's he made an unforgettable phone call to Former Vice President Dan Quayle as President Clinton and a duped Quayle talked to "Clinton" for five minutes. At the end of the conversation, Whitman broke character and let Quayle know that it was Brian Whitman calling and certainly not The President. A national radio interview in 2005 where he impersonated Michael Jackson had listeners and ABC Radio management believing that Jackson was indeed on their radio. More recently, a radio skit that he did with co-host Tim Conway, Jr., where he played Don Imus (at the height of an Imus controversy) prompted the Los Angeles Times to report that the real Don Imus was on the air, even quoting Whitman's "Imus" character. When informed of the bit, the Times promptly printed a retraction. At the time, Whitman expressed utter disbelief that The LA Times would have fallen for what was an obvious comedy bit.

During this time, Whitman toured America with his political opponent Sean Hannity performing live shows, entertaining huge crowds in cities like NY, LA, Dallas, San Diego, Phoenix, Las Vegas and many more.

Media superstar Glenn Beck, a twenty-year friend of Whitman, writes about the Imus controversy sparked by Brian in his bestseller, "An Inconvenient Book."

Brian formerly hosted The Brian Whitman Show on WABC in New York, New York, from 1997 to 2007 (he joined WABC at age 24, becoming the youngest talk host in the history of the legendary 77 WABC) Whitman also did a show broadcast on KABC in Los Angeles from 1998 to 2005.

=== Later years: 2005–present ===
Whitman co-hosted The Conway and Whitman Show on KLSX in Los Angeles, California, with Tim Conway Jr. from 2005 to 2008. Whitman also hosted a weekday morning webcast on Rick Dees Entertainment's allnumber1hits.com in 2009.

Brian Whitman was a featured contributor to Glenn Beck's radio and television programs. When he appeared as Glenn Beck's very first guest on Glenn's first TV show on cable news, Brian said he was proud and honored to be asked. Beck and Whitman had been friends for fifteen years and Beck wanted Whitman to be his first guest. On the air Whitman quipped, "So, I'm guessing The Pope wasn't available tonight?" Brian also served as the regular fill-in host on Beck's nationally syndicated radio program for years.

Brian was the first former KLSX-Los Angeles personality to launch a podcast, which he hosted solo in 2009. He has quipped that he is "The Podcast Pioneer" and suggests, perhaps tongue-in-cheek, that he contributed greatly to the avalanche of podcasts that followed his, so many of which were influenced by the dominant era of KLSX FM Talk. He went on to do a podcast show with his former radio partner Tim Conway Jr., but Tim left to pursue conventional radio positions at KFI 640AM.

While Brian's success in media is overwhelmingly due to his comedic talents, Whitman has also talked openly on his radio programs, as well as podcasts, about deeply personal issues ranging from the untimely passing of his parents only weeks apart to struggles with depression and dependence on medication that he has dealt with in a very public way.

In a recent interview he put it this way: "I got into radio to entertain people, to make them laugh, not to save the world. I also believe that a broadcaster has a wonderful opportunity to bond with an audience when he (or she) puts himself out there, vulnerabilities and all. My listeners come to me to be entertained but I also think it's critical to bond with them in a personal way. It's okay for them to know who I am – challenges and all."

In 2011, at the urge of his accomplice Sam Rubin, Brian Whitman called into LA's "KTLA Morning News" and, at least for a bit, fooled the news anchors into thinking that Regis Philbin had called into the show just days after he stepped down from his dynasty, "Live with Regis & Kelly." Everyone on the KTLA Morning News had a lot of fun and were laughing live on the air. Rubin revealed Brian's identity on the air at the end of the bit. Everyone was very gracious and had a blast with it. Whitman's been impersonating Regis for years and a similar phone call to WPLJ-New York's Scott Shannon morning radio show warranted a mention in Philbin's bestselling memoir, "I'm Only One Man."

On May 31, 2012, Brian Whitman joined the Salem Radio Network/KRLA Radio in the Los Angeles, Orange County and Inland Empire region on AM 870 The Answer and AM 590 The Answer (KRLA AM 870 and KTIE AM 590) with Heidi Harris and Ben Shapiro in morning drive from 6-9 AM. In November, 2012 Whitman took more of a lead role on "The Morning Answer with Heidi, Brian and Ben," serving as the on-air anchor while continuing to contribute his comedic impressions, often liberal political arguments and humorous observations to the dialogue.

Heidi Harris left the morning show when her contract was not renewed by Salem in March 2013. Former Sean Hannity producer, Elisha Krauss, was brought in to replace Harris. The new show, called "The Morning Answer with Brian Whitman, Ben Shapiro and Elisha Krauss" officially debuted across Southern California on April 2, 2013.

On April 1, 2013, Brian Whitman was the featured guest on The Adam Carolla Podcast, the Most Downloaded Podcast in the World, according to The Guinness Book of Records. Adam and Brian, old pals from their days on Carolla's morning show on KLSX, reminisce about The FM Talk Station, radio people in general, the oddities of working in radio and they wrap it up with a totally ad-libbed riff on "bad morning Zoo types." "Doing Adam's Show meant a great deal to me personally and professionally," Whitman said. "I live to make Adam laugh!"

Two years later, contract discussions happened again, among the usual suspects. Salem was not at all interested in losing Whitman, the anchor of their Morning Answer Show, and was aggressive in inking a deal with Brian that would have him in the co-anchor chair through the end of 2017. Whitman has personally refused to comment on any ongoing negotiations or specifics, saying: "It's my great honor to have spent roughly a quarter century on the air in Los Angeles, the greatest city in the world, with a company that respects me and rewards me in a way that a Los Angeles morning broadcast personality ought to be rewarded."

Ben Shapiro announced he would depart "The Morning Answer" on January 13, 2017. Salem removed Elisha Krauss from the show on January 6, 2017. At a staff luncheon in Spring 2017, KRLA bestowed upon Brian a plaque for FIVE YEARS OF SERVICE (2012–2017) to Salem Communications/KRLA. Whitman said the contract talks, while private, "have me thinking that I might be around for many years to come." On August 17, 2017, the station celebrated his 45th birthday (see external link) with a call from Phil Boyce, Salem Media VP of broadcasting, announcing that they have renewed his contract to continue co-hosting mornings with Jennifer Horn.

On October 10, 2017, Salem Media Group announced that it had signed a new, multi-year contract extension with Whitman. This pact will have Whitman anchoring The Morning Answer for 'years to come.' It's common for companies to not publish the duration of a talent's contract so that market competitors aren't able to forecast when a particular talent will be available. "Let's just say that Donald Trump had better get used to my criticisms of his leadership and my parodies of his bizarre Presidency," Whitman quipped. Whitman exited the KRLA morning show in December 2020. Jennifer Horn remains as solo host.

On December 9, 2019, Whitman made his third appearance on the pioneering podcast ‘Adam Carolla Show’. Brian has been a guest in 2013, 2017 and now, 2019. "I just love Adam and all of those guys. Adam and I go back well over a decade to the KLSX days," Brian remarked. Whitman tweeted in January 2020 that the producers of The Adam Carolla Show kindly passed along that they received an extraordinary positive reaction to Brian's December, 2019 guest appearance. Whitman quickly announced that he would return to Carolla's show within weeks. On Monday January 27, 2020 Brian Whitman made his fourth visit to Adam Carolla's incredibly successful daily podcast. In 2015, PodcastOne estimated that Adam Carolla's Show averages between 700,000 and 800,000 listeners per episode. It was noted that Carolla sometimes hits one million downloads for a single episode.

=== Radio hosting experience ===
WKCI FM, New Haven – Afternoon Host, 1994 KKBH FM, San Diego – Morning Host, 1995 (Moved to Southern California to mornings for KKBH shortly after college graduation) KGB FM, San Diego – Morning Host, 1996–1997 WABC AM, New York, NY – All Night Host, 1997; Weekend & Fill-In Host, 1997–2007 WPLJ FM, New York, NY – Guest Afternoon Host, 1997–1998 Comedy World, Los Angeles, Nationally Syndicated – Morning Host, 2000 KABC AM, Los Angeles – Interim Morning Host, 1998 – 1999; Weekend & Fill-In Host 1999–2005 KLSX FM, Los Angeles – Evening Host, 2005–2008 KRLA AM, Los Angeles/KTIE AM, San Bernardino – Morning Host, 2012–December 2020.

(Throughout this time Whitman was also operating his nationally syndicated comedy service, which he launched in January, 1991 and was also filling in for nationally syndicated radio stars like Glenn Beck, Mike Gallagher, Randi Rhodes, Stephanie Miller and Montel Williams)

== Voice impressions ==
Some of Whitman's many voice impressions include: Whoopi Goldberg, Joy Behar, Jay Leno, Chris Matthews, Don Imus, Louie Anderson, George W. Bush, Bill Clinton, Ronald Reagan, Tim Conway Jr., Rick Dees, Bob Dole, Al Gore, Senator Ted Kennedy, Kenny Kingston, Tom Leykis, Jack Nicholson, Al Rantel, Judge Larry Seidlin, Jack Silver, Don Pardo, Regis Philbin, Frosty Stillwell, George Noory, Alex Trebek, Gene Rayburn, Michael Jackson, Donald Trump and Arnold Schwarzenegger .

Brian was recently asked how many voices he does and his standard answer is: "I do a lot but after 50 – 100, trust me, they all start to sound alike."

Brian has done his voices on TV, too. He has appeared on The Tony Danza Show, On-Air with Ryan Seacrest, The Dennis Miller Show, The Stephanie Miller Show, and Into the Night Starring Rick Dees. Comedy Central's Mind of Mencia has featured Brian's George Bush impression as has Complete Strangers on ABC. Whitman has also appeared many times on cable news outlets CNN, Fox News Channel and CNBC. He has also performed dozens of times at the World Famous Laugh Factory on Hollywood's Sunset Strip.
