= BWE Media Networks =

The BWE Media Networks, LLC
- Company type: Public
- Industry: Entertainment
- Founded: July 31, 2015
- Founder: Le'Auntray Burch
- Headquarters: Suffolk, Virginia, United States
- Divisions: The BWE Talent & Casting
- Subsidiaries: The BWE Television Network; The BWE Studios; The Los Angeles Television Festival
- Website: www.thebwe.com

The BWE Media Networks, LLC. is the parent company of The BWE Television Network and The Los Angeles Television Festival.

== The BWE Television Network ==
With an announced launch date of January 1, 2018, The BWE will premiere with several series from its production company The BWE Studios. "Hot Video Countdown" and "Lakeland", have both been announced.

=== Hot Video Countdown ===
The studio's flagship series is Hot Video Countdown, a daily music video countdown series. Viewers who vote online or text in their votes will see there favorite videos make the top 5 countdown of the day, in addition to celebrity interviews and live performances. The show is hosted by Josh Skinner (On Air with Ryan Seacrest), actress Brit Sheridan (Kate, Supernatural), actor and model Sam Sarpong and Deja Riley, daughter of music legend Teddy Riley. The series premieres October 2015.

=== Lakeland ===
Lakeland follows the lives of several diverse students attending Lakeland High School. The reality teen drama is a collaboration between the network and actor Michael Copon's production company, Michael Copon Studios.

== The Los Angeles Television Festival ==
The Los Angeles Television Festival (LATF) is an annual festival that allows independent filmmakers and executives the opportunity to celebrate indie produced TV pilots. LATF is held at The Hollywood & Highland Center in Los Angeles, CA inside partnering venues.
