= Hot Video Countdown =

- Created by: Le'Auntray Burch
- Presented by: Josh Skinner; Brit Sheridan; Sam Sarpong; Deja Riley
- Country of origin: United States
- Original language: English

Production
- Producer: Avery Vaughn

Original release
- Release: September 8, 2015

Hot Video Countdown is a daily music video series airing on The BWE Television Network. The show is hosted by Josh Skinner (On Air with Ryan Seacrest), actress Brit Sheridan (Kate, Supernatural), actor and model Sam Sarpong and Deja Riley, daughter of music legend Teddy Riley. In addition to music videos, Hot Video Countdown features musicians, actors, and other celebrities promoting their latest work in music, TV and film. Premiering January 1, 2018, performers Tahj Mowry, Tequan Richmond, and Don Benjamin have all announced they'll be on the first week.
