= Kennedy (commentator) =

American political commentator

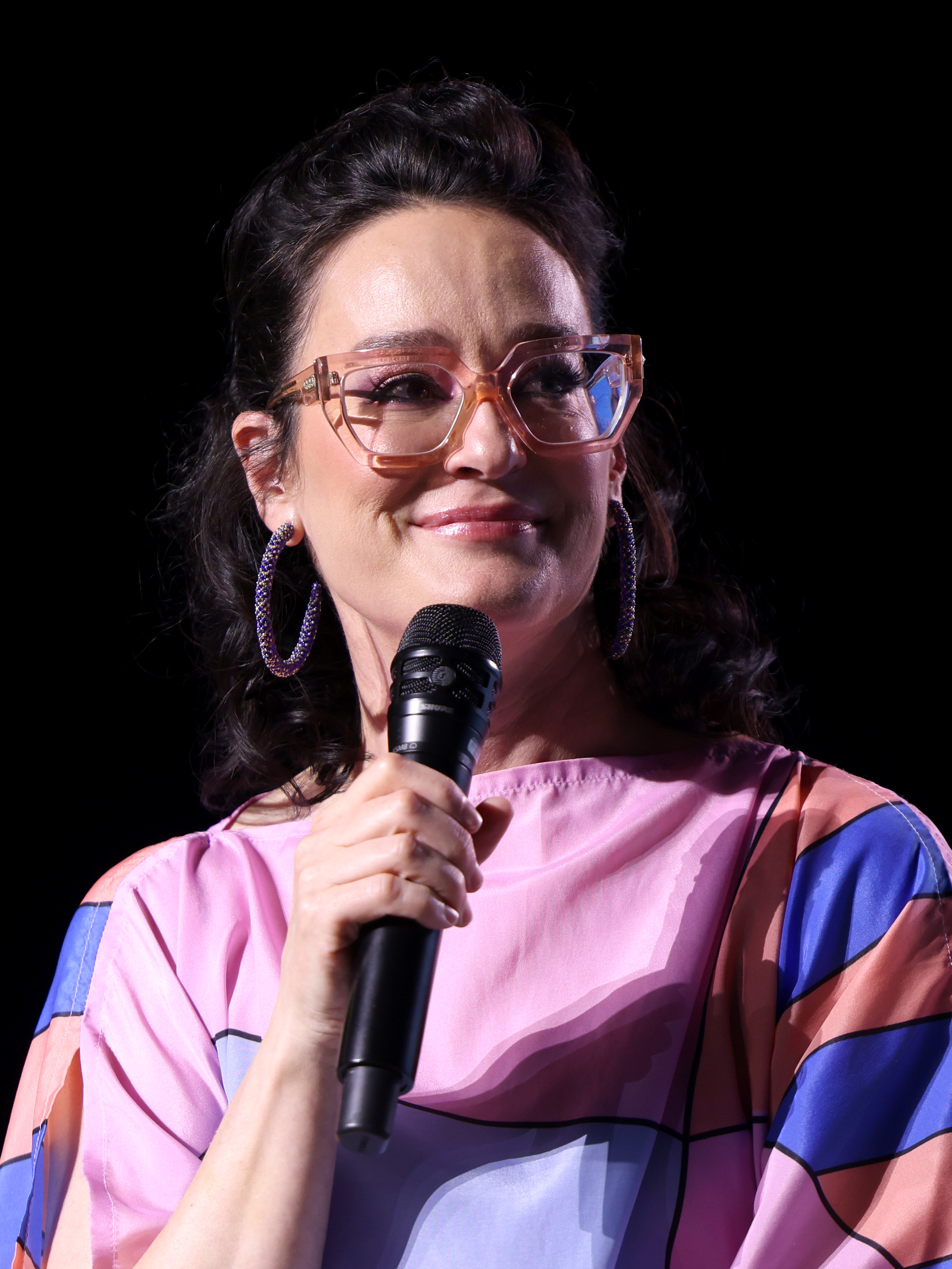
- Kennedy in 2025
- Born: Lisa Kennedy Montgomery; September 8, 1972 (age 54); Indianapolis, Indiana, U.S.
- Education: Santa Monica College; University of California, Los Angeles (BA)
- Occupations: Political commentator Game show host Television personality
- Years active: 1991–present
- Political party: Independent
- Other political affiliations: Republican (formerly)
- Spouse(s): Dave Lee (m. 2000; div. 2017) Fred (m. 2026)
- Children: 2
- Website: KennedyNation.com

Lisa Kennedy Montgomery (born September 8, 1972), referred to mononymously as Kennedy, is an American Libertarian political commentator, radio personality, author, and former MTV VJ. She is a commentator on Fox News Channel, a primary guest host of Fox's Outnumbered and The Five, host of the podcast Kennedy Saves The World on Fox News Radio and a columnist for The Daily Mail. Kennedy was the host of MTV's now-defunct daily late-night alternative-rock program Alternative Nation throughout much of the 1990s. She hosted Kennedy on the Fox Business Network from 2015 to 2023.

== Early life ==
Lisa Kennedy Montgomery was born in Indianapolis, Indiana, and raised in Lake Oswego, Oregon, a suburb of Portland. Kennedy and her two brothers were raised by her mother. Her mother is an immigrant from Romania and her father is of Scottish descent. She attended Lakeridge High School. She attended Santa Monica College before transferring to the University of California, Los Angeles; she later completed a bachelor's degree in philosophy in 2005.

Kennedy interned as a DJ at KROQ radio in Los Angeles as a teenager. She was known on KROQ as "the Virgin Kennedy".

== Career ==
Kennedy began her career as a VJ on MTV in 1992. She hosted Alternative Nation from 1992 to 1997. By 1995, she had become such a recognizable cultural figure that the sitcom Murphy Brown introduced a new character named McGovern, modeled after her. She appeared uncredited as a crew member in an episode in the series Star Trek: Voyager, titled "Persistence of Vision", which aired on October 30, 1995.

In 1999, Kennedy published her book Hey Ladies! Tales and Tips for Curious Girls, in which she incorporated a multitude of personal experiences. That same year, she moved to Seattle to host The Buzz on KQBZ radio; the show was a mix of news, local issues, and comedy. Kennedy left Seattle in 2001 to cohost a morning radio show with Ahmet Zappa on the Comedy World Radio Network, The Future with Ahmet & Kennedy, a similar mix of current events and comedy. She later co-hosted a morning show with Malibu Dan, The Big House.

Beginning June 3, 2002, Kennedy hosted Game Show Network's Friend or Foe?, which ran for two seasons. On April 1, 2003, she guest-hosted the GSN show WinTuition as part of GSN's April Fools prank where hosts swap places, while the original hosts usually appear as cameos, and play as contestants in Lingo for charity.

She also hosted GSN's Who Wants to Be Governor of California?, a televised debate among fringe candidates in the 2003 California gubernatorial recall election, such as actors Gary Coleman and Mary Carey. On July 3, 2003, Kennedy hosted a pilot episode for a proposed revival of Scrabble on GSN, titled Scrabble Challenge. The show was ultimately not picked up.

Beginning September 23, 2005, Kennedy appeared as an occasional panelist on VH1's Best Week Ever and MSNBC's Scarborough Country. In October 2005, she became host of Fox Reality's Reality Remix until that series ended in June 2008.

In December 2007, she guest-hosted the evening show several times on Los Angeles talk-radio station KFI, before being hired by the station for a regular Sunday-afternoon show. In April 2008, she joined Bryan Suits as cohost of the Kennedy & Suits Show at that station through September 30, 2009. She hosted Music in the Mornings on KYSR in Los Angeles from 2009 until March 2014.

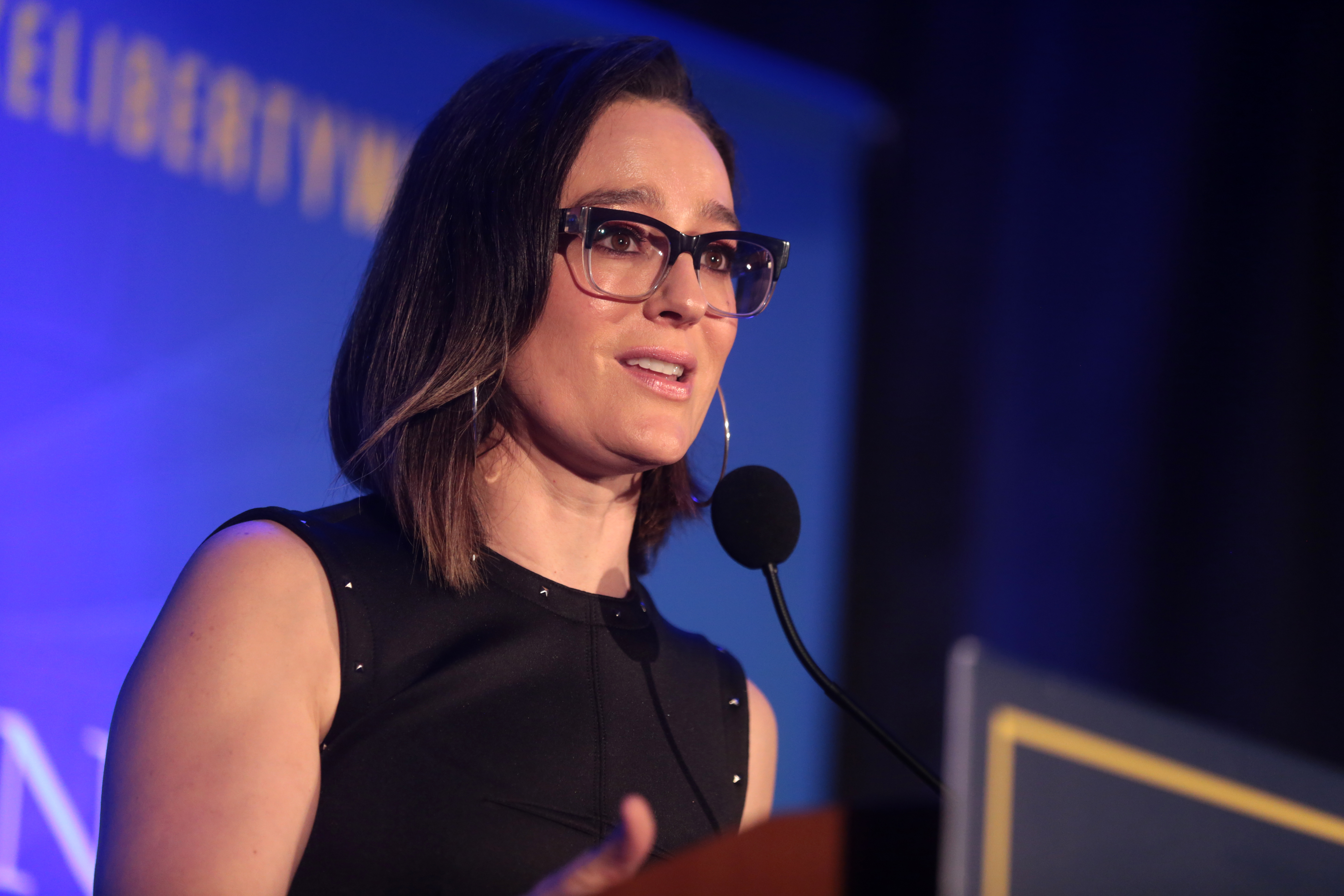
Kennedy in July 2018

On January 18, 2011, she began appearing as Anthony Sullivan's assistant on PitchMen, looking for new inventions to promote in infomercials.

Kennedy joined Fox Business Network as a contributor in 2012. She co-hosted The Independents, a current-events and political discussion show, from its debut on December 9, 2013. The show was cancelled in January 2015, but she continued as host of her own program, Kennedy. Kennedy was put on hiatus March 13, 2020, due to the COVID-19 pandemic. On October 19, 2020, the program ended its seven-month hiatus. On May 31, 2023, Fox Business announced that it would be ending Kennedy after 8 years. She continues to serve as a regular guest/host on Fox News.

Following the cancellation of Kennedy on FBN, Kennedy announced that her podcast Kennedy Saves The World would be putting out episodes Monday-Friday at 7 p.m. EST beginning on June 26, 2023.

She is also a contributor to Reason.com and Reason.tv, and occasionally serves as guest host for Bill Carroll, John and Ken, and Tim Conway Jr. on KFI. She was a correspondent on the Fox Business talk show Stossel, and made occasional appearances as a panelist and guest host on Fox News' Red Eye. She makes appearances on other Fox talk shows, such as Outnumbered, and The Five, and on the conservative news and political satire talk show Gutfeld!.

Kennedy served as a regular host of Fox News Saturday Night from June 2023 through January 2024.

== Politics ==
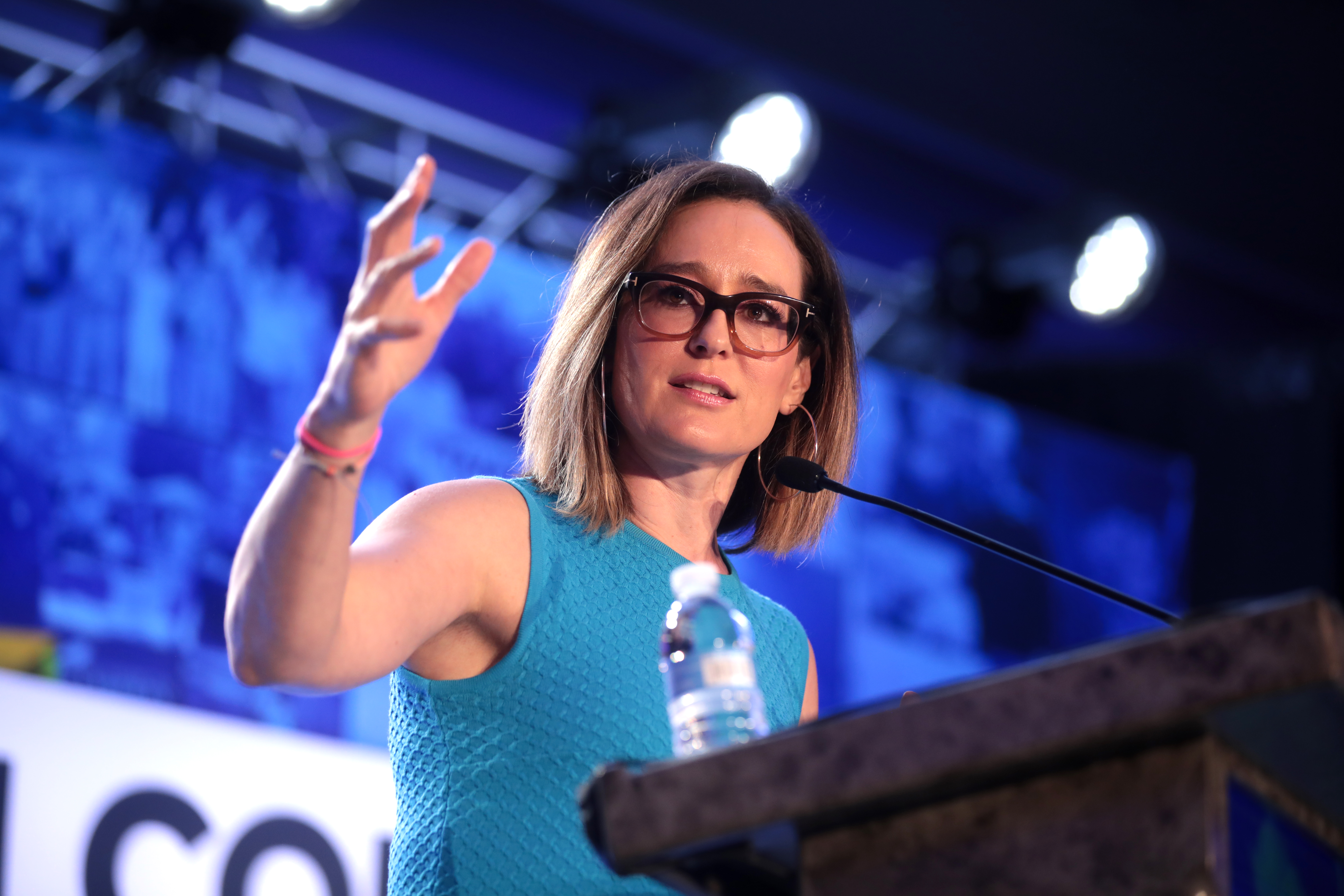
Kennedy speaking with attendees at the 2019 Young Americans for Liberty Convention at the Philadelphia Airport Marriott in Philadelphia, Pennsylvania

Kennedy is registered as unaffiliated. She is a supporter of same-sex marriage, and officiated at the wedding of fellow Fox contributor Guy Benson to husband Adam Wise. She also supports privatization of Social Security. She opposes the "war on drugs" and bureaucratic regulation.

Kennedy described herself as an "ardent Republican" in 1994. At MTV's 1993 Rock 'n' Roll Inaugural Ball for Bill Clinton, she chanted, "Nixon now! Nixon now!" whenever the Clintons went on stage. Along with being a fan of Richard Nixon, she supported Dan Quayle and Bob Dole. She was a speaker at the 1996 Republican National Convention.

She later abandoned social conservatism, saying, "Social conservatism was really bringing me down, and I realized, as time went on, that I wasn't a Bush conservative. I was really a libertarian." She was first introduced to libertarianism when Kurt Loder suggested she read Ayn Rand's Introduction to Objectivist Epistemology. She actively supported Gary Johnson in both the 2012 and 2016 presidential elections.

In March 2012, Reason published an article by Kennedy saying atheism is a religion on par with theistic religions. In 2014, according to Robert Draper, her show is not pro-Republican; it "bash[es] not only 'Obamacare' but also the NSA, neoconservatives and social scolds."

== Personal life ==
Kennedy is divorced from former professional snowboarder Dave Lee; the couple has two daughters.

Around 1993–94, Kennedy had a flirtatious friendship with Goo Goo Dolls frontman and guitarist John Rzeznik, who was then married to his first wife; Rzeznik and Kennedy used to hang out together in New York City when Rzeznik was in town and his wife back in Buffalo. They admitted sharing a mutual attraction, but stayed away from a sexual relationship due to his marital status. The song "Name" was written about her.

She has the Romanian flag tattooed on her left ankle, and a pink Republican elephant tattooed on her upper left thigh.

In September 2012, during an appearance on Red Eye, Kennedy said she had been diagnosed with celiac disease, leading her to change to a more meat-based diet.

Kennedy is a triathlete.

Excerpts from Kennedy's segment on Fox were featured in the "Now this" segment of the first episode of season 7 of Last Week Tonight with John Oliver.

On December 10, 2025, Kennedy announced her engagement to a man named Fred. In August 2026, she married Fred in Lanai, Hawaii.

== Publications ==
- Kennedy (1999). Hey Ladies!: Tales and Tips for Curious Girls (1 ed.). New York City: Main Street Books. ISBN 9780385490948.
- Kennedy (2013). The Kennedy Chronicles: The Golden Age of MTV through Rose-Colored Glasses (1 ed.). New York City, New York: Thomas Dunne Books. ISBN 978-1250017475.

== See also ==
- List of people diagnosed with celiac disease
