= Carolla Digital =

American podcast network

- Type: Podcast
- Country: United States
- First air date: February 23, 2009
- Availability: International
- Headquarters: Carolla One Studios, Glendale, California
- Owner: Adam Carolla
- Official website: www.adamcarolla.com/carolladigital/

Carolla Digital (formerly ACE Broadcasting Network) is an American podcast network. The flagship program of the network is The Adam Carolla Show, which is released daily. The network also produces several other shows that are released on a weekly basis.

== History ==
Carolla Digital (then the ACE Broadcasting Network) was launched on February 23, 2009 with the first broadcast of The Adam Carolla Podcast, three days after Carolla's terrestrial radio show on KLSX was cancelled as part of a format switch to top-40 programming. Carolla and Donny Misraje worked out of Carolla's Glendale warehouse, which is now the network's recording studio, to record the show. In 2012, ACE Broadcasting was rebranded as Carolla Digital, a change that coincided with Carolla's legal dispute with co-founder Donny Misraje over ownership of the company.

The debut episode of The Adam Carolla Podcast was downloaded more than 250,000 times in its first 24 hours, and within its debut week the show recorded 1.6 million downloads. By the end of 2009, it was selected by iTunes as its Best Audio Podcast of the Year. In May 2011, The Adam Carolla Show was certified by Guinness World Records as the most downloaded podcast in history, having received 59,574,843 unique downloads between March 2009 and March 2011, breaking the previous record held by The Ricky Gervais Show.

With the success of The Adam Carolla Podcast, which was later renamed The Adam Carolla Show, the network grew. In late 2009, Carcast debuted. In early 2010, Spider and the Henchman, The Parent Experiment, Daves of Thunder, and The Film Vault had their first shows. Shows debuting in late 2010 were Life Lessons with Jim Carolla, This Week with Larry Miller, The Big 3 Podcast, and The Punch with Craig Carlisle. Ace on the House debuted in early 2011, and For Crying Out Loud debuted in late 2011. Alison Rosen Is Your New Best Friend and Penn's Sunday School debuted in early 2012. In September 2012, Dr. Drew announced on Adam's show that he would soon have a program on this network.

== Financial backing ==
Initially, production and distribution costs of the podcast were funded entirely by Carolla himself. Carolla stated that bandwidth costs were over $9,000 per month as of May 2009. In September 2009 Carolla began generating revenue for the show with spoken advertisements for his first sponsors. Shows on the network currently include both prerecorded and live read advertisements for sponsors. In many cases, the network receives profits directly from the sales generated through their referrals (tracked by offer codes).

In the past, ACE Broadcasting content has been distributed through channels other than the ACE Broadcasting website and iTunes. ACE Broadcasting previously had distribution deals with CBS Radio and Stitcher Radio. The network was in talks with SiriusXM radio to distribute content through the Howard 101 channel, but an agreement was not reached.

Also contributing to the funding of the network, Carolla performs live in the greater Los Angeles area and around the country. The live shows have included elements of the podcast as well as improvisation. Recordings of live performances have in turn been re-broadcast as podcasts themselves. As these live performances became more popular, friends of the show occasionally joined Carolla. Indirect additional revenue comes from the network increasing the popularity of Carolla's unrecorded standup performances, as well as his other publications and productions, each often promoted on various podcasts.

== Programming ==
=== Current programming ===
Carolla Digital offers the following shows:

==== The Adam Carolla Show ====
The Adam Carolla Show is a daily podcast featuring Adam Carolla. Carolla is joined most days by co-hosts Gina Grad (who presents news stories) and Bryan Bishop (who provides audio drops). Each show begins with commentary from the hosts on both mainstream and obscure news stories. The trio are then joined by a celebrity guest or friend of the show for an interview segment. The interview then transitions back into the news with the guest contributing their thoughts on the events of the day. The show also sometimes features Adam's one-on-one interviews with guests.

==== The Adam & Dr. Drew Show ====
"The Adam & Dr. Drew Show" features Adam Carolla & Dr. Drew Pinsky. The format is similar to that of Loveline, in that the show begins with thoughts from Adam and Drew, followed by listener calls on subjects like drug addictions, sexual dysfunctions, and depression. Unlike Loveline, sound bites and sound drops are uncommon. The show typically features just Adam and Drew, but occasionally they are joined by a guest; frequent guests include comedians Brad Williams, and Jo Koy. As of May 2016, the show now produces five episodes per week which are released on the same days as The Adam Carolla Show podcast.

==== Carcast ====
Carcast features Adam Carolla and co-host Matt Deandrea. The duo discuss cars and interview celebrities and car enthusiasts. The show debuted at number 1 in the Automotive section of iTunes. The former co-host Sandy Ganz left the show during the dispute between Carolla and Donny Misraje, Ganz's cousin.

==== Ace on the House ====
Ace on the House is a home improvement show, derived from a periodic segment on The Adam Carolla Show. Carolla answers listener questions and dispenses advice regarding home improvement topics. Carolla was a carpenter prior to his radio and acting jobs. He is frequently joined by guest hosts with home improvement backgrounds. In late 2011, Ray Oldhafer was introduced as co-host. In 2017, a second weekly show was introduced with Oldhafer joined by Eric Stromer. In 2018, Oldhafer was let go and the podcast returned to one show per week hosted by Carolla and co-hosted by Stromer.

==== The Dr. Drew Podcast ====
A program hosted by Dr. Drew Pinsky. Dr. Drew will typically take listener calls and discuss topics relating to sexual and emotional health, as well as addiction medicine with experts in particular fields. Shows will often carry a theme based on which guest expert is participating.

==== For Crying Out Loud ====
Hosted by Lynette Carolla and Stefanie Wilder-Taylor, For Crying Out Loud expands The Parent Experiment to include discussion of popular culture and life beyond parenting, as well as statements made by Lynette's husband on his program.

==== The Great Love Debate ====
Based on the nationally touring series of live shows, it is hosted by creator Brian Howie, actress/writer Jill Bartlett, Dating and Social Media Expert Kate Edwards, as well as commonly featuring several guest appearances. It focuses on discussing dating.

==== Hammer & Nails ====
Hammer and Nails is a twice-weekly collaboration with husband & wife team, Skip and Alison Bedell, who also co-host Spike TV's Catch A Contractor with Adam Carolla. The couple routinely discusses several topics including a behind-the-scenes look at CAC episodes, current and surprising events, answering viewer/listener questions, and discussing about their personal experiences. Shows will either be produced and in-studio with engineer Joe Cumia, or "On The Road (OTR)": a raw, mostly unedited podcast with the Bedells while they are away from home, having a more personal tone.

==== Reasonable Doubt ====
Comedian Adam Carolla is joined by criminal defense attorney Mark Geragos for a conversation about current events, pop-culture and their own personal lives. Along with occasional guests, the hosts will also take listener phone calls and answer your questions.

=== Previous programming ===
The following shows were previously provided by ACE Broadcasting:

==== Penn's Sunday School ====
A follow-up to Penn Radio, each Sunday, instead of attending church, atheists Penn Jillette, Michael Goudeau, and Matt Donnelly discuss news of the previous week, religion, and other suggested topics. The podcast is still available as an independent podcast.

==== This Week with Larry Miller ====
Each week, Larry Miller tells stories from his own life, in the tradition of great American radio raconteurs like Jean Shepherd and Garrison Keillor. Miller's tales are smart without being stuffy or hostile, and uplifting without being naive. Common topics include Miller's love for fusing together scraps of soap bars, drinking and the enjoyment of the simple pleasures of life. This show resumed January 9, 2013, being on hiatus since Miller suffered a head injury in April 2012. This podcast was still available as an independent entity with the new name The Larry Miller Show until December 2020.

==== Alison Rosen Is Your New Best Friend ====
Hosted by former ACS newsgirl Alison Rosen, this podcast swaps between formats depending on the day of the week. Mondays feature Alison interviewing a variety of guests, including comedians, authors, and fellow podcasters. Thursday episodes are typically a round-table discussion between Alison, Jenna Kim Jones, and others. This podcast is still available as an independent entity.

==== Life Lessons with Jim Carolla ====
Life Lessons was a series of recorded therapy sessions between Jim Carolla, Adam's father, and Ray Oldhafer, Adam's lifelong friend. The show was meant as a way to remove the veil from therapy sessions. Jim Carolla's love of jazz was also a common topic of the show. In July 2012, Adam cancelled this program because it was losing him money and his father refused to ask for PayPal donations on the air.

==== The Parent Experiment ====
The Parent Experiment was a weekly discussion of issues facing parents. The show featured discussion between the hosts, both of whom are mothers, regarding their daily lives as well as interviews and features on special topics.

==== The Big 3 Podcast ====
Don Barris, Tony Barbieri, and Perry Caramello, known for their appearances in the Comedy Central film Windy City Heat, host this comedy podcast. Included are appearances from Terrifying Tim and other guest comedians. In September 2011, the show moved to Simply Don the Podcast Network.

==== The Film Vault ====
The Film Vault was a movie-based podcast hosted by Bryan Bishop and Anderson Cowan. The hosts, both former Loveline employees (where Bishop was a phone screener and Cowan was the Audio Engineer), take a look back into the annals of film to comprise their top 5 films of a different genre each week. The hosts chose to end the show, prompted by the departure of producer Logan Moy from the network. The show has since resumed independent of ACE Broadcasting.

==== The Punch with Craig Carlisle ====
Hosted by Craig Carlisle and recorded live at the Elephant Theater, The Punch was a variety show styled podcast featuring readings and performances by various artists.

==== Spider and the Henchman ====
This "SportsCast" was hosted by Kevin Hench, Carolla's writing partner on The Hammer and frequent Fox Sports contributor, and John "Spider" Salley, a 4-time NBA champion. The hosts discussed the events taking place in the world of sports, sometimes with a guest, in a loose format.

==== Daves of Thunder ====
Daves of Thunder was a comedy podcast featuring Dave Dameshek and David Feeney. The co-hosts were joined by a family of characters in the Daves of Thunder Players.

The show had a run of 63 episodes over a span of almost a full year. The first episode aired on March 14, 2010 and the last show was released on February 28, 2011. The abrupt cancellation of this popular podcast created something of an uproar among fans seeking some form of explanation. The podcast returned sporadically throughout 2020 and 2021 with new episodes which were dubbed by the hosts as "The New Testament".
