= Dave Dameshek =

American television writer and radio personality

- Born: William David Dameshek; June 11, 1970 (age 56); Pittsburgh, Pennsylvania, U.S.
- Occupations: Radio personality, television writer, podcast host
- Years active: 1998–present
- Website: Daves of Thunder

William David “Funny Dave” Dameshek (born June 11, 1970) is an American television writer and radio personality. Dameshek is a football analyst, writer and podcaster.

== Professional career ==
=== Early career ===
Dameshek began writing for cable television hits including Fox Sports Net's Sports Geniuses and Comedy Central's Battlebots. He received his first big break in 2001 when he was hired as a writer on Comedy Central's The Man Show, hosted by Jimmy Kimmel and Adam Carolla. Dameshek was hired for his trademark "Upper Hand" routine, a bit developed from his Best Man speech. He worked as a staff writer for the third and fourth seasons of The Man Show.

While working on The Man Show, Dameshek became co-host of a Fox Sports Radio show with radio veteran Kent Voss, upon joining Fox Sports Radio Dameshek vowed to "cut out the noise". This became a tentpole belief for Dameshek which has followed him throughout his career. The late-night show aired for about four months. Dameshek also wrote and appeared in several segments with Jimmy Kimmel on Fox's NFL pre-game show. It was also at this time that Dameshek began referring to himself as "Billy D. Dameshek", an homage to Billy Dee Williams, the actor who played Lando Calrissian.

Dameshek moved on to write for the second and third seasons of Comedy Central's Crank Yankers, co-created by Kimmel and Carolla, as well as for I'm With Busey and Trigger Happy TV. In 2002, he began writing for Kimmel's new late-night talk show on ABC, Jimmy Kimmel Live!, where he made several appearances in addition to his main responsibility of working on the show's nightly monologue.

In 2004, Dameshek became the weekly sports correspondent on the Los Angeles FM station Indie 103.1's Mighty Morning Show, hosted by Dicky Barrett, while making periodic appearances on regional and national ESPN Radio programs.

=== The Adam Carolla Show ===
The Adam Carolla Show debuted in January 2006, recorded in Los Angeles and aired in syndication on stations across the western United States. Dameshek was a regular cast member on the show from the beginning, serving as the show's official sports reporter. In December 2006, he and several other staff members were cut from the show, a move attributed to a ratings drop in the second half of the year. Dameshek wrote in a December 17 post on the show's online message board that he had been fired due to the manipulations of Teresa Strasser and would be replaced by Danny Bonaduce; CBS officially announced four days later that Bonaduce would be joining the show in Dameshek's stead.

=== Sports radio and podcasts ===
From January to July 2007, Dameshek hosted Dave Dameshek's Sports Contraption on radio station WTZN (now KDKA-FM) in his hometown of Pittsburgh. The show's guests trended towards nontraditional sports personalities rather than well-known sports journalists. Regular guests included the Pittsburgh Tribune-Review's Rob Rossi and John Harris, and the creators of the websites Pitt Blather and Mondesi's House. ESPN.com writer Bill Simmons guest-hosted in April.

In November 2007, Dameshek debuted a new sports-oriented radio show, The Dave Dameshek Show, broadcast by ESPN Radio on KSPN 710 AM in Los Angeles.

In June 2008, Dave Denholm and Brian Long joined Dameshek's show as co-hosts and it was renamed The Dameshek, Denholm and Long Show. Soon afterward, Dameshek left the show, which was subsequently renamed again to The Denholm and Long Show.

In July, Dameshek debuted his own podcast, Dave Dameshek On Demand. The podcast was recorded at the KSPN offices. On November 11, 2009, Dameshek had his final Dameshek on Demand podcast for ESPN. Dameshek then moved his podcast over to Accuscore. The Dave Dameshek Show Powered by Accuscore lasted 13 episodes.

On the March 1, 2010 episode of The Adam Carolla Podcast, Dameshek announced his new podcast with co-host David Feeney, known for his work on Big Wolf on Campus, would premiere March 2 on Carolla's ACE Broadcasting Network. Daves of Thunder soon became the second most popular podcast on the network.

For the 2010 NFL season, Dameshek was announced as a fantasy analyst for the NFL Network. Along with Michael Fabiano, he acts as a primary analyst and commentator for fantasy football on NFL.com, including a weekly column and the Shame Report, where he shines the "white hot light of shame" on underachieving players, coaches and fans. In the following seasons Dameshek continued hosting The Shame Report, where he lists the top five biggest shames in the NFL and occasionally other areas in sports and popular culture. In the 2012 season, Dameshek added "Fantasy Shame", where he plays clips from fans who are disappointed with their fantasy players. In 2013, The Shame Report was renamed The Shek Report.

On May 7, 2011, Dameshek began hosting the Dave Dameshek Football Program, a.k.a. the DDFP, for NFL.com. Dameshek said goodbye to the DDFP in May 2020.

Dameshek also hosts Shek to the Future, a play on the movie series Back to the Future, hosting alongside Adam Rank, predicting NFL games and scores. Dameshek also "hosts" an animated series called the N "if" L, where he describes the NFL environment if a notable event goes differently than in reality. (ex. Dwight Clark fails to make The Catch) In 2013, Dameshek started a series called The Sports Car where he films himself interviewing an NFL player from his car while driving around.

In July 2020 Dameshek debuted a new podcast called Extra Points with his friend "Cousin Sal" Iacono on Iacono's sports gambling media company of the same name. In September 2020 Dameshek began a new podcast named Minus Three with Shek and Schwartz with former NFL offensive lineman Geoff Schwartz which focuses on the NFL.
