= Shane Burgess =

Shane Burgess may refer to:

- Shayne Burgess, darts player
- Shane Burgess, a character in Three Wishes (TV series)
