= Over My Head =

Over My Head may refer to:

== Songs ==
- "Over My Head", a spiritual song which provides the basis for "Up Above My Head", recorded by Sister Rosetta Tharpe among others
- "Over My Head" (Fleetwood Mac song), 1975
- "Over My Head (Better Off Dead)", a 2003 song by Sum 41
- "Over My Head (Cable Car)", a 2005 song by The Fray
- "Over My Head", a song by The Aliens
- "Over My Head", a song by Asaf Avidan from Gold Shadow
- "Over My Head", a song by Brian Littrell from Welcome Home
- "Over My Head", a song by David Gray, a B-side of the single "Babylon"
- "Over My Head", a song by Furslide from Adventure
- "Over My Head", a song by Icehouse from Man of Colours
- "Over My Head", a song by James Marriott from Are We There Yet?
- "Over My Head", a song by King's X from Gretchen Goes to Nebraska
- "Over My Head", a song by Lit from the soundtrack of the film Titan A.E.
- "Over My Head", a song by Moloko from I Am Not a Doctor
- "Over My Head", a song by Pere Ubu from The Modern Dance
- "Over My Head", a song by Powderfinger from Internationalist
- "Over My Head", a song by Ray Davies from Other People's Lives
- "Over My Head", a song by Red House Painters from Ocean Beach
- "Over My Head", a song by Richard Marx from Inside My Head
- "Over My Head", a song by Robert Calvert from Hype
- "Over My Head", a song by Semisonic from All About Chemistry
- "Over My Head" (Toni Basil song), 1983
- "Over My Head" (Alabama Shakes song), 2015
- "Over My Head" (Echosmith song), 2018

== Other media ==
- Over My Head (album), a 1994 album by Gerry Rafferty
- Over My Head (EP), a 2016 EP by Jaymay
- "Over My Head" (Haven), an episode of Haven

== See also ==
- Over Your Head, a home improvement reality television series
