= Erin Murphy =

American actress (born 1964)

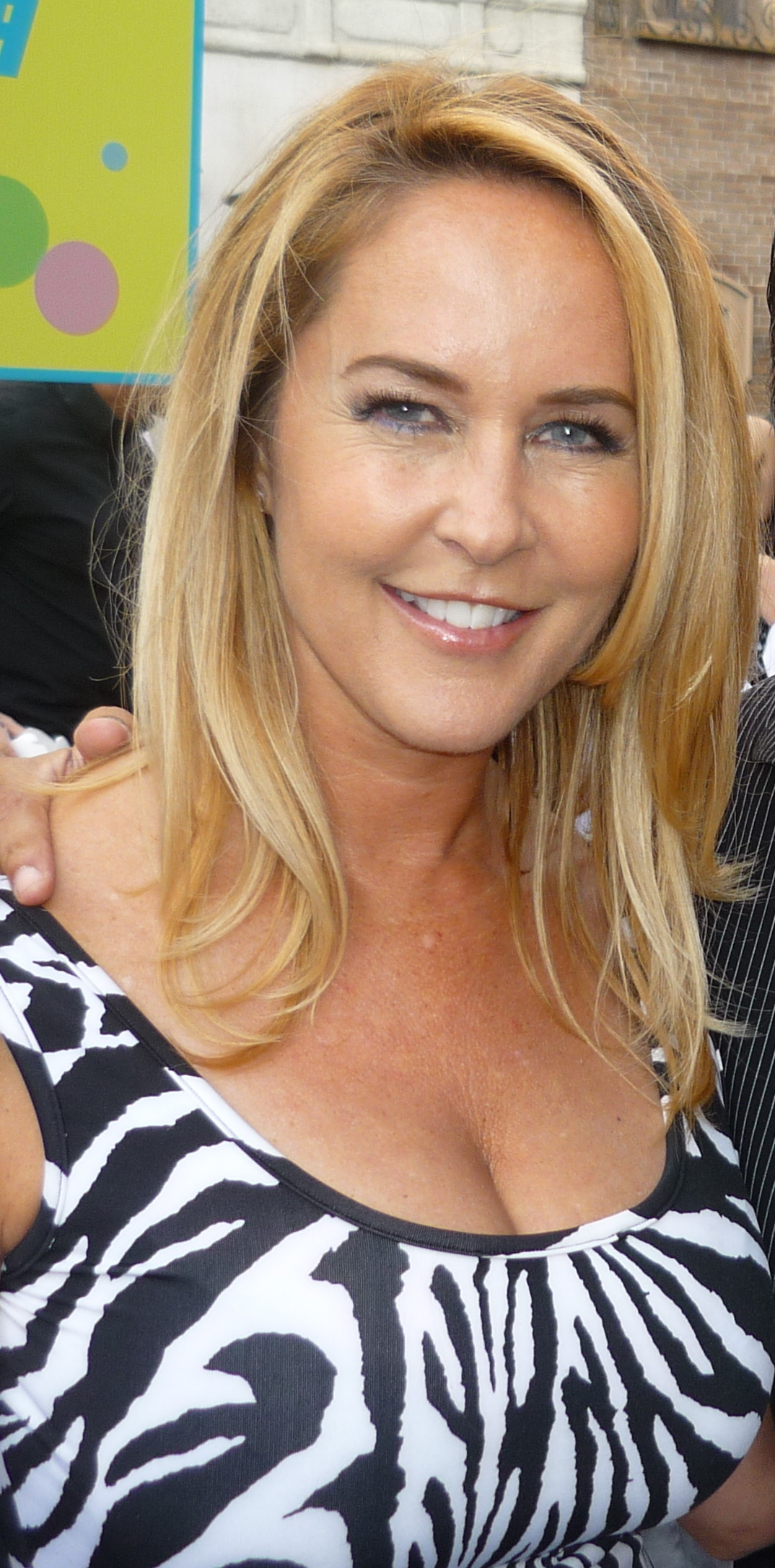
- Murphy in 2008
- Born: Erin Margaret Murphy; June 17, 1964 (age 62); Encino, California, U.S.
- Occupations: Actress, television host
- Years active: 1966–present
- Spouses: Terry Rogers (m. 1984; div. 1989) Eric Eden (m. 1993; div. 1998) Darren Dunckel (m. 1998)
- Children: 6
- Relatives: Diane Murphy

Erin Margaret Murphy (born June 17, 1964) is an American actress, who is best known for her role as young Tabitha Stephens in the television sitcom Bewitched, in 103 episodes from the show's third season (in 1966) to the last original episode in 1972. For the first season, she shared this role for 18 episodes with her fraternal twin sister, Diane, as they were of similar appearance and stature. As they got older and looked less alike, only Erin played the role.

== Post-Bewitched years ==
Following Bewitched, Murphy guest-starred on shows such as Lassie, appeared in over 100 commercials, and modeled for Hang Ten swimwear. She was an El Toro High School cheerleader and homecoming queen during her senior year. She graduated from El Toro High School in 1981. Murphy has worked as a casting director, makeup artist, fashion stylist, acting teacher, motivational speaker, and stunt double for actress Virginia Madsen. Since 2014, Murphy has been co-owner of Slim Chillers, a company that makes low-calorie frozen vodka martini pops.

== Reality TV and hosting ==
Murphy has worked as a television host and correspondent (TVLand, Fox Reality Channel, TVGasm.com, and E!) and as the on-air moderator for Allergan Medical. She has also been an infomercial host (Ab Shark for Thane, Bun Shaper for Emson, SomaTrac Inversion Table), and the host of Disney Family.com's Parentpedia.

On December 20, 2006, she appeared as one of the 12 "strangers" on the NBC game show Identity. In 2007, she was featured on CNN Headline News as a "Celebrity With a Cause" discussing her work with autism-related charities.

In 2008, Murphy appeared as a celebrity judge on Danny Bonaduce's I Know My Kid's a Star reality show contest for young actors and with Bob Saget on 1 vs. 100. She has also appeared on Craft Lab (DIY/HGTV), Groomer Has It (Animal Planet) with her giant Leonberger, and on Over Your Head (HGTV) building flagstone steps in her backyard.

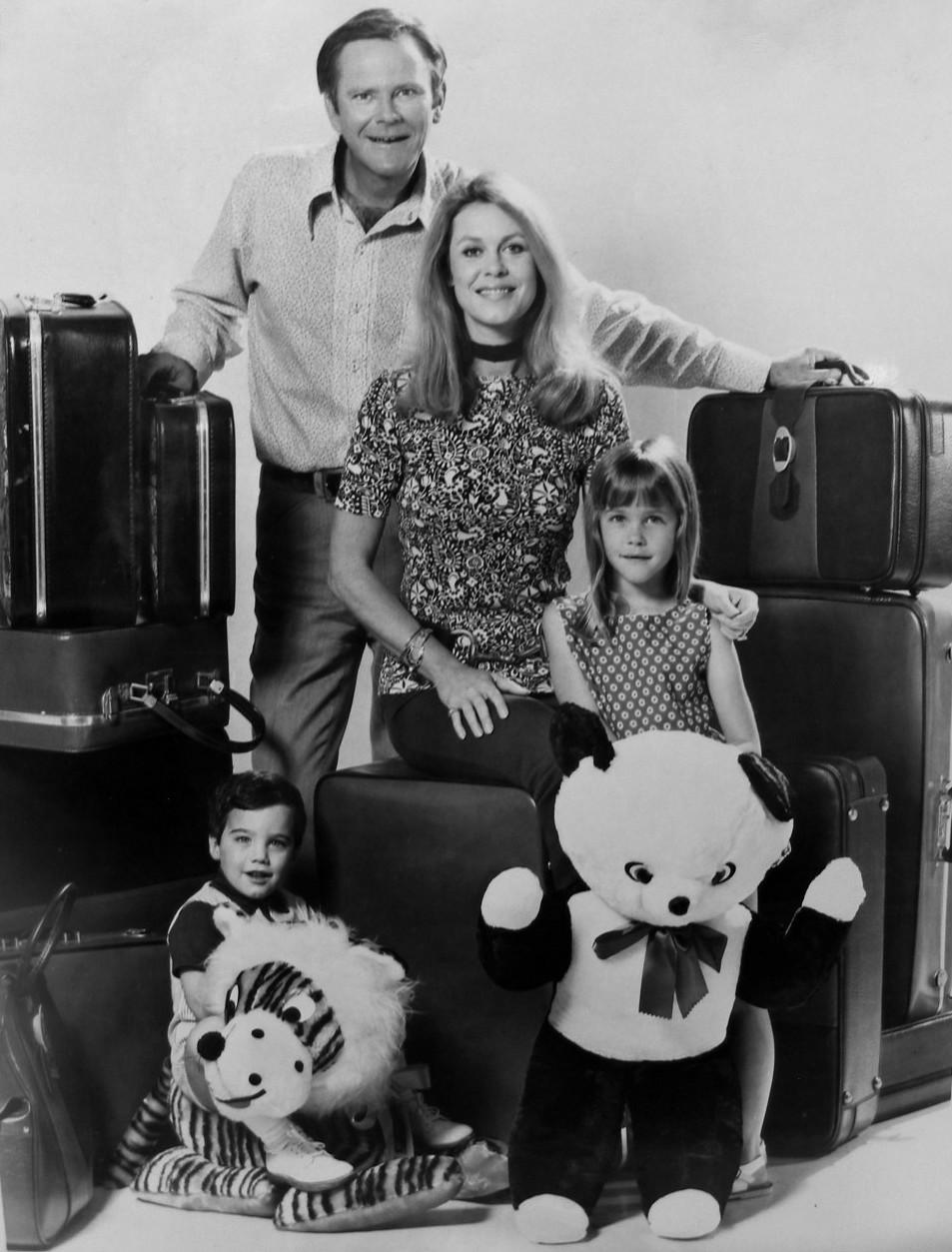
Murphy, pictured alongside fellow Bewitched actors Dick Sargent, Elizabeth Montgomery, and David Lawrence (1971).

Murphy also starred on Hulk Hogan's Celebrity Championship Wrestling series for CMT, in which the celebrities trained as professional wrestlers. Erin's wrestling persona is Mistress of Mayhem (aka M.O.M.).

Murphy was a contestant in the celebrity finale of season one of Rupaul's Drag U.

Murphy appeared as a central character in the January 26, 2021, episode of To Tell the Truth.

In March 2026, Murphy teased on social media that she is returning to TV screens with a brand-new project set to premiere in the fall. While she hasn't revealed full details yet, she shared that it is an innovative project.

== Personal life ==
Murphy is a fashion, beauty, and luxury lifestyle writer, with her work appearing in numerous magazines and online publications. She is also a motivational speaker and fundraiser for charitable organizations. Murphy often speaks out on the subject of autism as one of her sons has the condition.

Murphy was featured in a photo spread January 2012 in OK! magazine with two of her alpacas on her ranch in Bell Canyon, California. Murphy discussed her company Erin Murphy Knits which offers hand knit eco-friendly alpaca wear.

In 2018, Variety wrote that Murphy had purchased her dream home on the beach in Malibu for $2.3 million.

Murphy has been married three times and divorced twice. Her three husbands are Terry Rogers (1984–1989), Eric Eden (1993–1998), and Darren Dunckel (May 1998–). She has two children with Rogers, one with Eden, and three with Dunckel.
