= Teresa Strasser =

American writer and television personality (born 1970)

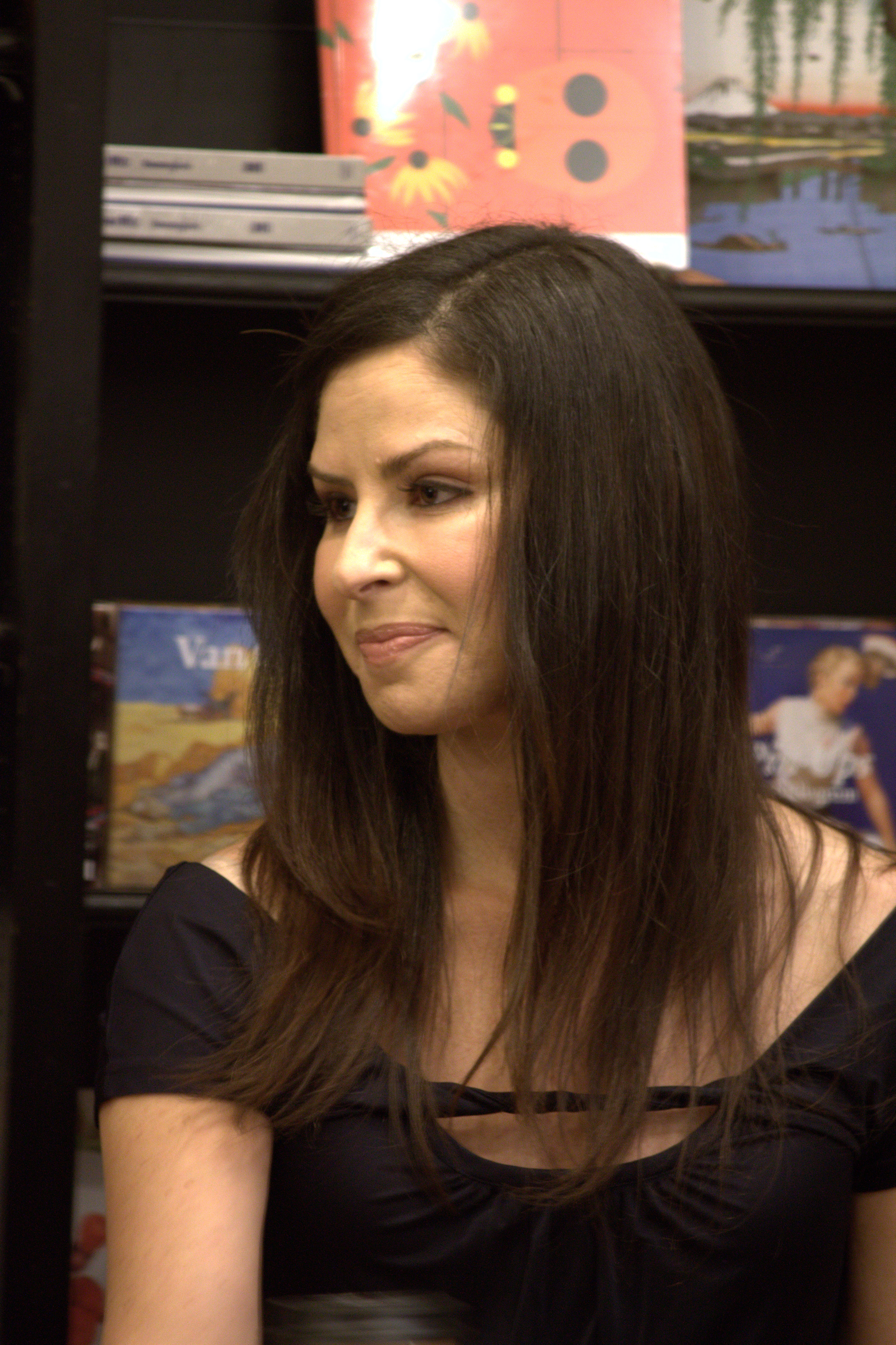
- Strasser in 2011
- Born: Teresa Lynn Strasser; June 8, 1970 (age 56); Panorama City, California, US
- Occupations: Radio personality, television personality, writer
- Years active: 1997–present
- Employer: CW7
- Known for: The Adam Carolla Show, While You Were Out
- Height: 5 ft 6 in (168 cm)
- Spouse: Daniel Wachinski (m. 2007)
- Website: TeresaStrasser.com

Teresa Lynn Strasser (born June 8, 1970) is an American writer and television personality known for hosting the first season of the home makeover show While You Were Out on TLC. She was nominated for a Daytime Emmy Award for her work that season. She later co-hosted The Adam Carolla Show. Strasser also won an Emmy for her work as a writer at Win Ben Stein's Money, a comedic game show on Comedy Central.

She is the author of two memoirs, most recently, "Making It Home: Life Lessons From a Season of Little League," which was named one of the best books of 2023 by USA Today.

== Early life and education ==
Strasser grew up in San Francisco, with her mother. She was raised Jewish. She attended The Brandeis School of San Francisco as well as Lick-Wilmerding High School on a low-income scholarships. She went on to study journalism at New York University.

== Career ==
=== Early years ===
Strasser began writing for Win Ben Stein's Money in 1997, winning a Daytime Emmy Award, and had several small film roles and writing jobs, including a writing credit for Who Wants to Be a Millionaire. She can also be seen playing a reporter in the cheerleading film, Bring It On: All or Nothing (2006).

=== While You Were Out ===
In 2002, Strasser hosted fifty episodes of While You Were Out when former host Anna Bocci left the show. Strasser had previously served as a writer for the show. She did not consider herself handy, but she compensated with her dark sense of humor and empathy, as she cried after several renovations. Strasser left the show after one season.

=== The Adam Carolla Show and The Adam Carolla Podcast ===
Strasser replaced Rachel Perry on The Adam Carolla Show on May 8, 2006, as the news anchor for the radio program. She had previously served as a fill-in before Perry officially left the show. In 2010, she left the show when taping was moved to nighttime, which caused a scheduling conflict. She was replaced by "radio co-host and News Girl," Alison Rosen.

==== Teresa's Ex-Files ====
A segment on the show in September 2006 focused on Strasser's past relationships. Her past boyfriends, such as Jimmy Kimmel Live! writer and The Sarah Silverman Program actor Steve Agee and a marketing executive named Brandon, discussed why their relationship failed. Normally, the skit is embarrassing for Strasser and her ex, such as when she claimed Agee cried after sex. The segment debuted September 6, 2006 with writer Greg Lee, whom Strasser dated for eight months. Strasser is also known to have dated former American Idol host Brian Dunkleman.

=== The Parent Experiment Podcast ===
From February to August 2010, Strasser and Lynette Carolla (wife of Adam Carolla) co-hosted a weekly hour long podcast on their parenting experiences. Strasser left the Parent Experiment due to other commitments, and was replaced by Susanna Brisk.

=== Peter Tilden Show ===
On August 19, 2010, KABC announced that Strasser would be joining the Peter Tilden Show as Tilden's female co-anchor. Strasser began her work there on August 23, 2010. On August 26, 2011 Teresa did her last show on KABC in order to focus on her TV, commercial voiceover and camera work.

=== Easy Listening Podcast ===
In April 2019 Teresa started a podcast with Gina Grad to discuss other podcasts.

=== Other television work ===
After leaving While You Were Out, Strasser hosted Lover's Lounge, a dating game show block on the Game Show Network in 2000 and 2001 with Helen Keaney. She was a feature story reporter for several episodes of Good Day New York in 2004, while also being the New York correspondent for both Good Day Live and On-Air With Ryan Seacrest. Strasser worked as a "love coach" along with Shop 'Til You Drop host JD Roberto on the 2006 ABC series How to Get the Guy until its cancellation. In October 2006, she replaced Debra Wilson as the co-host of the TV Guide Channel show TV Watercooler. She frequently appears on VH1 and E!'s various "list" shows. She guest starred on Alicia Silverstone led dramedy, Miss Match. Strasser served a brief stint as a correspondent on the entertainment and gossip news show TMZ on TV which premiered in September 2007. She quit TMZ due to a time conflict with the Adam Carolla Show. In addition, she has covered the red carpet for the Emmy Awards and the Tony Awards, for E! and TV Guide Network, respectively. Teresa currently works as a host and reporter for the new Scripps Networks show The List. The program features pop culture topics, news and current issues, as well as celebrity news and events and what's going on around town. Currently co-host on The List, a TV pop culture information show.

== Writing career ==
Strasser has worked regularly as a freelance columnist for the Los Angeles Times and The Jewish Journal of Greater Los Angeles, and won an award on June 24, 2006, for columnist of the year from the Los Angeles Press Club. Strasser is currently a regular contributor for the calendar section of the Los Angeles Times. She also wrote a book titled, EXPLOITING MY BABY: Because It's Exploiting Me, which was published in January 2011. In October 2011, ABC ordered a pilot, "Mother Teresa" to be written by Strasser based on her book, "Exploiting My Baby"

In 2023, Strasser released her most recent memoir, "Making It Home: Life Lessons From a Season of Little League" which was published by Penguin Books. It covers a single season of Little League baseball she spent with her dad watching her oldest son play after her brother died of cancer at age 47. The book earned a starred review from Publishers Weekly, and was endorsed by baseball legend Cal Ripken, Jr. who called it "wonderful." The memoir won Sports Book of the Year, and was chosen as one of the best books of the year by USA Today. The book received excellent reviews from Good Housekeeping who called it "A perfect book," and The Arizona Republic. Strasser appeared on Mike Rowe's podcast, The Way I Heard It with Mike Rowe, and Rowe called the memoir "beautiful."

=== Selected publications ===
- Strasser, Teresa (January 4, 2011). Exploiting My Baby: Because It's Exploiting Me. National Geographic Books. ISBN 978-0-451-23207-6.
- Strasser, Teresa (April 17, 2020). Eichenfeuer: Wesen des Waldes (in German). BoD – Books on Demand. ISBN 978-3-96733-070-0.
- Strasser, Teresa (June 6, 2023). Making It Home: Life Lessons from a Season of Little League. New York: Penguin. ISBN 978-0-593-54608-6.

== Awards and recognition ==
- Emmy Award - Best Host "The List" (2015)
- Los Angeles Times Bestseller, #8 Paperback Nonfiction for Exploiting My Baby
- Three Los Angeles Press Club Awards (2004 and 2005 for Columnist of the Year)
- Emmy Nomination – writer (commentary) – Suncoast Chapter
- Emmy Nomination – program host/moderator – Suncoast Chapter
- Simon Rockower Awards for both Excellence in Feature Writing and Writing about Singles ("When Booty Calls")
- Emmy Award, Outstanding Special Class Writing, "Win Ben Stein's Money"
- Daytime Emmy Nomination – Outstanding Special Class Series Host "While You Were Out" TLC (2003)

== Personal life ==
Strasser married Daniel Wachinski, an IBM accountant, at the Venetian in Las Vegas, Nevada, in 2007. The couple have two children. She currently lives in Phoenix where she hosts syndicated entertainment show, "The List," for which she won a 2015 Emmy Award for Best Host.
