= The Adam Carolla Show (radio program) =

- Genre: Hot talk
- Running time: 4 hours (including commercials)
- Country of origin: United States
- Home station: KLSX
- Starring: Adam Carolla; Teresa Strasser; Bryan Bishop; Dave Dameshek
- Announcer: Mike Dawson
- Created by: Adam Carolla
- Written by: Mike Lynch
- Produced by: Angie Fitzsimmons
- Original release: January 3, 2006 – February 20, 2009
- Opening theme: "Someday I Suppose" by The Mighty Mighty Bosstones
- Ending theme: "Theme from The Naked Gun" (a.k.a. "Theme From Police Squad!", "Frank Drebin's Theme") by Ira Newborn
- Website: AdamCarolla.com
- Podcast: The Adam Carolla Show Podcast

The Adam Carolla Show was a morning radio program that was syndicated, hosted by Adam Carolla, which began airing on January 3, 2006 and ended on February 20, 2009. The show was produced by CBS Radio as part of its Free FM format, and was based out of KLSX in Los Angeles. On February 20, KLSX changed format from hot talk to Top 40 (CHR) as KAMP-FM, and The Adam Carolla Show was canceled along with several other programs. The Adam Carolla Show was heard in a number of major metropolitan markets on the West Coast of the United States.

== Overview ==
The show featured Adam Carolla and Teresa Strasser.

The supporting cast included sound effects guy Bryan Bishop, producer Angie Fitzsimmons, writer Mike Lynch, announcer/technical producer Mike Dawson, technical production assistant Mike Cioffi, production assistant David D. Keller and board operator Bill Mahoney. Jimmy Kimmel served as creative consultant in the first year, and hosted the show on June 7 and June 8, 2006, while Carolla was with his wife for the birth of their twins and April 26, 2007, while Carolla was at New York City for the Tribeca Film Festival to see the premiere of his movie The Hammer.

== History ==
On August 4, 2005, Carolla announced that he would leave Loveline to pursue a position in morning radio. Adam's last night on Loveline was November 3, 2005, to allow him to have time to prepare for his morning debut at the beginning of 2006. He stated that he would love to continue to do Loveline, which seemed to fly by while doing it, but the show would not be a possibility.

On October 25, 2005, Infinity Broadcasting officially announced that it would be replacing the popular syndicated Howard Stern Show, (which was making a leap to satellite radio) with Carolla's new show in several western United States markets. On January 3, 2006 The Adam Carolla Show debuted in twelve of the 27 markets in which Stern had been broadcast, including Los Angeles, Las Vegas, San Francisco, San Diego, Phoenix and Portland, Oregon.

=== Replacing Perry ===
Former MuchMusic and VH1 video jockey Rachel Perry served as the original news reader on the show. On March 20, 2006, the show noted that Perry was absent for a few days to work on a TV pilot (a show titled Beyond). However, a few days stretched into a few weeks, during which the show featured several fill-ins, including Strasser, former MSNBC anchor Claudia DiFolco, and actress Tracy Metro. The show also had guests and a few of their recurring characters fill in. In late April, Perry's pictures and bio were removed from the show's website. Finally, on May 1, Carolla announced that the show had taken the opportunity to use Perry's absence to drop her from the show, as they felt that the chemistry wasn't quite there. On May 8, Strasser was named as Perry's official replacement.

=== Firing of Dameshek, Brusca, and Newcomb ===
In a December 17, 2006 message on the Adam Carolla Show message board, sports broadcaster Dave Dameshek wrote that he and the show's producer Jimmy Brusca had been fired. Dameshek also wrote that Danny Bonaduce would be his replacement. Tad Newcomb, also known as Fat Tad or Big Tad, was a regular on-air contributor to the show, and has also confirmed that he was fired via his MySpace account.

CBS Radio released a press release on December 21, 2006 announcing Bonaduce as a featured member of the show starting January 2, 2007, but did not confirm or deny any firings.

On December 28, 2006, Carolla posted to the show's message boards and wrote that network executives had wanted to replace Dameshek because of the show's poor performance in Los Angeles. Carolla said the show's Arbitron ratings in the city shifted from 1.2 to 3.3 to 0.7, and CBS used this as an excuse to "strip the show". On the January 2nd show, Carolla commented on the firings and confirmed his posting that they were due to low ratings. He said that he had no say in the decision, and while he was upset about the firings he expressed a desire to move on.

=== Departure of Bonaduce ===
On December 12, 2007, it was announced on the air that Adam had come down with an illness and would not be coming to host the show. Danny and Teresa continued the show with Bryan taking a more active role as an on-air talent. On-air talent remarked many times that this was an unusual situation and that Adam has attended work while sick many times before and that he would have to be very sick in order to stay home. KLSX Program Director Jack Silver stated, "I have to take Adam’s word. When an employee says he's sick, short of going to his house with a doctor, I have to take him on his word." That afternoon, Adam phoned into Dr. Drew's radio show and re-stated that he was sick, but would see how he would feel the next day before making a decision on whether to go into work or not. Adam proceeded to stay on the phone for over an hour.

Adam's absence continued throughout the end of the week, including missing the 2007 Ace Awards and the live remote broadcast of the yearly "Christmas Carolla" holiday special from the Galaxy Theatre in Santa Ana, CA. During this time, Danny Bonaduce informally appointed himself head of the show until Adam returned, touching off the start of a very long messageboard thread (see below) calling for his removal from the show.

On December 17, 2007, the Official Adam Carolla Show message board was removed from the website, including all threads related to Adam's illness. The Adam Carolla Show went on scheduled hiatus following the Christmas episode.

On December 21, 2007, CBS Radio issued a press release concerning the future of The Adam Carolla Show and creation of Danny Bonaduce's new show:

"...contributing show member Danny Bonaduce will relinquish his role on THE ADAM CAROLLA SHOW and begin hosting his own program on KLSX. Positioned between the highly rated Frosty, Heidi & Frank Show (10:00AM-2:00PM) and Tom Leykis' program (3:00-8:00PM), BROADCASTING BONADUCE: THE DANNY BONADUCE SHOW will premiere Wednesday, Jan. 2, 2008 on-air and online from 2:00-3:00PM, PT. Teresa Strasser will continue to contribute to the station's morning drive program with Adam Carolla."

On the September 12, 2008 show Carolla confessed that the reason for him missing the last shows in 2007 was because he had come down with "The Red Flu", referring to being sick of working with the red headed Danny Bonaduce. It was also during Adam's weeklong absence that the show's messageboard became flooded with messages calling for Danny's removal from the show. (Danny had already been unpopular with many listeners, which was reflected in a large number of messageboard messages.) The messageboard thread addressing this quickly gained over 1,300 posts, and many people posting were new users who'd never posted a message before. Adam himself (his official screen name) was spotted reading the messageboard several times, but did not post.

== Controversy ==
=== Asian American community ===
Carolla's morning show became the subject of a minor controversy within a few weeks of airing when on January 24, 2006, Carolla played a segment which spoofed the upcoming Asian Excellence Awards. The spoof consisted of what sounded like a typical excerpt from an awards show, except that the dialogue of the actors consisted only of the words "ching" and "chong", repeated. The National Association of Asian American Professionals (NAAAP), The Asian American Journalists Association (AAJA), and The Center for Asian American Media publicly objected to the spoof, calling it racist and threatened to ask advertisers to withdraw their support from the show if the station did not issue an apology. On February 22, 2006, Carolla without fanfare read a brief apology for the segment, in which he said that his show had regrettably "crossed the line". On April 26, 2006, Carolla invited the head of the Media Action Network for Asian Americans, Guy Aoki, and Teddy Zee, co-chair of the Asian Excellence Awards, to further explain that when he aired the bit, he had no idea that "ching chong" was a racial slur. Mention of the bit was removed from the official show blog.

== Cancellation ==
On February 18, 2009 it was confirmed that The Adam Carolla Show had been canceled and the last show would air on February 20, 2009. The cancellation came in effect of a format shift at the Los Angeles flagship station (KLSX) from hot talk to a Top 40 (CHR) format. The show would continue to be made available via Westwood One in a 'best-of' format.

== Syndication ==
The Adam Carolla Show was heard on the following stations, and broadcast weekdays from 5–10:00 a.m. PT (with the 5a.m. hour a "best of" compilation of the previous morning's broadcast), for around a month CBS Radio will provide a "best of format" to give time for the affiliates to fill their morning slot:

- Los Angeles, CA - 97.1 Free FM
- San Diego, CA - 103.7 Free FM
- Portland, OR - 101.1 KUFO
- Las Vegas, NV - 107.5 KXTE FM
- Sacramento, CA – 106.5 KWOD
- Seattle, WA – 107.7 KNDD
- Reno, NV – 100.9 KRZQ
- Fresno, CA – 104.1 KFRR
- Palm Springs, CA - 99.5 KMRJ
- Portland, ME - 970 WZAN (tape delayed 7-10 PM ET)
- Pocatello, ID - 92.1 KEGE
- Pullman, WA - KHTR FM 104.3
- Phoenix, AZ - 103.9
- Phoenix, AZ - 101.5
- A San Francisco station (FM 106.9 KIFR) was also a carrier of the show but dropped the program sometime late in the first year as the station changed to an oldies format. It was then carried on AM 1550 KYCY into 2007 but was ultimately dropped partway through the year. In the months after KYCY's cancellation a few different bay area listeners called into the show to voice their dismay and annoyance at the station's decision to drop the show. Adam said that he was also annoyed and felt that the show may have rubbed many overly sensitive KYCY listeners the wrong way.

Podcast and live internet stream are popular among listeners in markets where show is not broadcasting, which was mentioned on air numerous times. Listeners have called from Midwest, East coast, Hawaii, Canada, Japan, Spain and England among other areas.

Most of the show was available for download via podcast through Free FM. The format varies depending on the station providing the RSS feed.

== Show content ==
=== Frequent guests ===
- David Alan Grier
- Eric Stromer
- Larry Miller did a weekly segment 'Stupid Beyond Belief', and several installments of "Hypothetical Road Trip", where Larry invariably chooses the wrong answer to an endless supply of either-or scenarios involving made up characters to accompany Larry on his hypothetical cross-country trips.
- Joel McHale
- Dana Gould

=== Recurring characters ===
- Deaf Frat Guy. He also goes by the name Jason or the nickname "Maverick", and is played by Josh Gardner. Deaf Frat Guy originally started his Greek membership as a Tau Kappa Epsilon at the University of Southern California. In May 2006, Deaf Frat Guy was removed from the fraternity, and decided to start his own, called Delta Fu Gamma. He created the fake Greek letter "Fu" because he believed that all possible Greek names had been used. The initials "DFG" also refer to "Deaf Frat Guy". Deaf Frat Guy first appeared on January 24, 2006.
- Fake Jack Silver. At the beginning of the second segment of every show, a parody of KLSX Program Director Jack Silver takes place after the commercial break. Fake Jack Silver is voiced by sound effects engineer Bryan Bishop, as mentioned on the December 14, 2006 show. Fake Jack Silver frequently mentions staying "hip" with younger listeners and talks about watching the ratings "needle" drop, or refers to "radio-kryptonite" when a boring bit or caller is on the air. Fake Jack Silver's biggest concern is being portrayed as homosexual, and thus the last thing he usually says is, in a stressed voice, "Not gay!" This segment has not appeared since 2008.
- Peanut. This intermittently appearing character (voiced by David Alan Grier), is a black woman ostensibly hired to answer the phones at the studios of CBS Radio (the real life networks where the Adam Carolla Show is broadcast). The running gag is that every time Peanut is featured on the show, the phone banks that she is supposed to answer ring constantly, and the calls are often put on hold or disconnected. Peanut's character is disrespectful, possessed of a hair-trigger temper, speaks poor English (once taking the day off for what she called "Mobba Loofin King's Burfday"), and usually ends the sketch by threatening to take off her earrings and flip-flops and challenging Adam to "take it to the parking lot" whenever he makes the slightest suggestion that Peanut is not doing her job.
- The Ed. A frequent contributor in 2006, caller "The" Ed Miller from Las Vegas would often call in as the show's official reviewer of television show Desperate Housewives (which he often referred to as "Separate Housewives". He would also call in to share his opinions on many sports related subjects, particularly horse racing. The Ed stopped making appearances after the show cast changes in 2006, but did go on to follow Dave Dameshek to his other radio projects.

== Future of the show ==
Carolla remained under contract to CBS Radio until December 2009, and was bound against hosting another radio broadcast program until the contract expired. However, beginning the following weekday after the final broadcast of The Adam Carolla Show, the host started a new incarnation of the show at carollaradio.com as a free daily podcast.

Originally recorded nightly at his home, the podcast eventually moved to be recorded in a studio and features conversations with many of the same guests who appeared on the radio show. In the inaugural podcast, Carolla stated that if the venture proved to be successful he would move forward with ambitious plans to expand it commercially upon the expiration of his CBS contract. The show quickly garnered a large audience, as the first episode was downloaded over 250,000 times in the first 24 hours of its being made available on the site. Soon after, the show was made available on iTunes and in its first week the podcast was downloaded over 1 million times, making it the number one iTunes podcast in the US and Canada. The broadcast is now known as The Adam Carolla Show and has been consistently ranked among the top 15 podcasts on iTunes since its inception on the site.

As of June 3, 2010, The Adam Carolla Podcast was renamed The Adam Carolla Show, though it is still only available for download on the internet and is not broadcast. Though Teresa Strasser acted as Carolla's sidekick for a time, she left in August 2010 to join The Peter Tilden Show on KABC (AM). Bald Bryan still supplies sound effects, though he's not always on the show. The show has returned to its old radio format, bringing back produced segments and regular phone calls.
