= Bryan Suits =

American veteran and radio personality (born 1964)

- Born: 22 August 1964 (age 62); Honolulu, Hawaii
- Military career
- Allegiance: United States
- Branch: United States Army; *Army Reserve; *California National Guard; *Washington National Guard
- Service years: 1989 – Unknown
- Rank: First Lieutenant
- Unit: 161st Infantry Regiment
- Conflicts: Operation Desert Storm; 1992 Los Angeles riots SFOR; Operation Iraqi Freedom
- Awards: Bronze Star Medal; Purple Heart
- Other work: Talk Radio host

Bryan Suits (born 1964) is an American war veteran of three military conflicts in Kuwait, Bosnia, and Iraq, and has been a talk radio host for more than 10 years. He has hosted talk-shows for radio stations in Seattle, Washington: KIRO (AM) and KVI, and in Los Angeles: KFI AM 640. Suits was born in Honolulu, Hawaii and lived in Lahaina, Hawaii until he was 12 years old, when his family moved to Washington. He was heard weekday afternoons on KOGO-AM/FM in San Diego in 2011–12 and Saturday evenings on KFI from 2009 to November 2013. Suits did a brief Monday - Friday stint on KABC, Los Angeles in the 9 am – 12 noon slot beginning in 2014. However, he ultimately was summoned back to KFI hosting Saturday evening program "Dark Secret Place", Sunday evening program "Super Hyper Local Sunday"a and served as the official military and tactical sounding board for other KFI shows for related news.

In July 2021, Suits announced that he would be leaving KFI. Six months later, he would return to Seattle to host morning show, "The Bryan Suits Show" on KTTH AM 770. Suits is also available through the subscription service Patreon for military and foreign affairs news.

== Biography ==
After graduating from Washington State University, Suits became a broker-trainee at Drexel Burnham Lambert.

=== Personal life ===
Suits has one daughter, with his ex-wife Rachel Suits, named Reagan Suits. AKA his "Varmint."

=== Military service ===
Enlisting in the United States Army Reserve in 1989, he served in Operation Desert Storm as a medic in HHT/2nd Squadron 2nd Armored Cavalry. In 1992, Suits was called up as a California Army National Guardsman in 4bn 160th Infantry in response to civil unrest following the "Rodney King" verdicts. In 1998 he deployed as a member of the Oregon Army National Guard to Bosnia as part of SFOR, the NATO mission to Bosnia. Suits was involved in the ICTY (International Criminal Tribunal for Yugoslavia) investigation of the Croatian militia called "The Jokers." This work is still classified. In 2002, he attended Officer Candidate School and received his commission. As a member of C Company, 1st Battalion, 161st Infantry Regiment, Washington Army National Guard he deployed as part of Operation Iraqi Freedom. His infantry company's Area of Operational Responsibility included the Tuwaitha nuclear complex (bombed by Israel in May 1981). Due to delays in replacements, the battalion's deployment was extended to 19 months. Suits was awarded the Bronze Star Medal and was wounded in action several times. He was subsequently awarded the Purple Heart. While serving in Iraq he claims that he met individuals who stated they were involved in the transportation of Iraqi WMDs to Syria.

While in Iraq he occasionally called into the Kirby Wilbur Show and reported on his experiences. He was also a contributor to the Iraq election log on the BBC news website. Lieutenant Suits collected rubber boots from his radio show listeners and distributed them to Iraqi children in what became known as "Boots for Suits". Upon his arrival back from his tour of duty in Iraq, he claimed that his ballot for the November 2004 general election, which he said was mailed to his wife from Iraq, was never counted. His claim became part of the public debate surrounding the contested 2004 Washington gubernatorial election. During the peak of the Tea Party movement, Suits spoke to Tea Party rallies as both a radio host and a soldier with experience in the war on terror.

=== Media career ===
The "Bryan Suits Show" first ran Monday to Friday from 9 pm to 1 am PT on KIRO (AM) from 1999 to 2002. Suits then moved to the prime drive time hours of 5 am to 9 am PT on KVI, following Sean Hannity. The topics on the show ranged from local news to kicker stories to the war on terror. Suits usually employed his sense of humor on all topics. He referred to the last hour of his show as "The Iraq Block" and devoted it mostly to discussion on the war in Iraq. It is in this hour that his experience in Iraq helped put some news items in perspective. Suits was deployed to Iraq in 2003 and returned to KVI in 2005 to continue his show. Suits reported on his KVI show that during his 2003 Iraq deployment, he received an injury to his groin area from a roadside improvised explosive device and now suffers from bladder pain syndrome.

On March 6, 2003, an Iraqi caller named "Mohammed" confronted United for Peace and Justice spokesperson Andrea Buffa on Suits' show. The clip was posted on the KVI website and quickly circulated around the Internet. However, some individuals noted that the individual did not have an Iraqi Arab accent.

Suits' show was canceled by KVI on November 9, 2007. Some listeners complained that November 9 was the Friday preceding the Veterans Day holiday (observed on November 11, each year in the U.S.).

Suits' show was replaced by the KVI show The Commentators with John Carlson and Ken Schram, formerly aired from 9 am to 12 noon. KVI aired the Laura Ingram show from 3 pm to 5 pm. KVI put Peter Weissbach in for an hour of Bryan's old time slot (5 – 6 pm), the host whom Suits had been brought in to replace.

Suits periodically filled in as a guest host from 7 to 10 pm, following the contentious removal of John Ziegler in December 2007 on KFI, AM 640 of Los Angeles.

Suits announced December 31, 2007 that he had accepted a position from 7 to 10 pm, following John and Ken beginning January 2008 on KFI AM 640 of Los Angeles. In April he was joined by long-time friend and fellow radio host Lisa Kennedy Montgomery, and they performed the show together under the banner of "The Kennedy & Suits Show". Kennedy's final broadcast on "Kennedy & Suits" was September 30, 2009, with Suits going it solo again as the "Bryan Suits Show". In addition, Suits hosted The Dark Secret Place from 2 pm to 4 pm on Sundays, in the time slot formerly held by Kennedy before she moved to weekdays.

Suits announced, on his January 8, 2010 show, that his last day at his current 7 pm KFI Los Angeles time slot would be on Friday, January 15, 2010. He planned to continue his Sunday show, Dark Secret Place on KFI. Citing family reasons, and not specific on his career move, he and his family were returning to the Seattle, Washington area. His replacement on KFI, Tim Conway Jr., would begin at the 7 pm time slot on Monday, January 18, 2010.

KVI AM 570 in Seattle, announced the return of The Bryan Suits Show weekday mornings, from 5 am to 9 am, starting Monday morning, January 25, 2010. Some 10 months later, KVI AM 570 in Seattle cancelled its conservative-talk lineup and switched to an Oldies format, on November 8, 2010.

While The Bryan Suits Show had been canceled, once again, by KVI in the days preceding Veterans Day, the Bryan Suits Show Facebook page stated that he had a safety net in place when hired back by Fisher Radio. In addition, Suits continued to host The Dark Secret Place, on Sundays from 2 to 4 pm, on AM 640 KFI Los Angeles. Beginning early March 2012, the show was moved to Saturday evenings, following the end of the Saturday installment of the Phil Hendrie show. The show has since also been picked up by XM Radio's America's Talk, airing Sundays at 5 pm pacific time.

In November 2011, Suits became the mid-day host on KOGO in San Diego while continuing to host his weekend "The Dark Secret Place" program on KFI. Suits left KOGO in 2012.

Starting on Monday, December 16, 2013, Suits took over for Geraldo Rivera on KABC Talk Radio AM 790 from 9-to-noon (Pacific time). He briefly revived his renowned "Dark Secret Place" program, in which he confines his topics of discussion to military-related matters and interviews with current or former members of the military. He abruptly ceased broadcasting the show, leaving listeners to find a note on his Facebook page stating that he would only continue doing the show in podcast form. His explanation declared in the post that the show had become "a pain in the ass" because he would have to give up personal time on the weekends to do it live, or have unspecified problems (possibly continuity errors related to developing stories) if he tried to pre-record it.

Bryan Suits' last 9-to-noon show on KABC was on 16 Jan 2015, resulting in KABC losing nearly all of the 9 to noon audience.

Brian Suits' Dark Secret Place returned to KFI AM-640 (Los Angeles) on Saturday April 4, 2015 and was heard from 8 pm to 11pm (Pacific) Saturdays, as noted in their weekend program line-up.

In April 2017, Bryan Suits started a new show, Super Hyper Local Sunday, which aired Sunday nights on KFI, 8pm to 10pm. It focused on local news from the Los Angeles County area, though often tied into other national and military related news stories.

Suits left KFI in early July 2021 continuing to upload to his online subscription service podcast, "The Dark Secret Place". His departure was cited as being a shift in political ideology by KFI leading to the limiting of speech regarding the 2020 Coronavirus Pandemic, 2nd Amendment rights, and the Black Lives Matter movement. Additional reasoning claimed by Suits was issues regarding his ownership of "The Dark Secret Place" and its redistribution to media platform, iHeartMedia.

On February 7, 2022, it was announced that Bryan Suits would host his own "Bryan Suits Show" airing on AM 770 KTTH from 6 am till 9 am. He was a fill in host during December and January 2022. He covers both national news and Seattle news.

On July 7, 2022, Bryan Suits announced via his ConnectPal channel that ConnectPal streaming service would be ceasing operations on July 31, 2022, and his "near daily" show would be moving to Patreon. He is offering 3 different levels of membership with increasing access to his exclusive paywall content.

On 6 May 2024, Bryan was let go at KTTH Seattle radio.

=== Political views ===
Suits was involved in a conflict between Geraldo Rivera and radio talk show host Tom Leykis in 2013 when Rivera apparently called both of them a "right wing jerk off." Rivera later clarified that he was only referring to Leykis. Bryan has cited himself as a Top Conservative on Twitter by using the popular conservative hashtag #TCOT.
