= Kenny Kingston =

American psychic

- Born: February 15, 1927; Buffalo, New York, U.S.
- Died: June 30, 2014 (aged 87); Studio City, Los Angeles, California, U.S.
- Occupations: Psychic, medium
- Partner: Valerie Porter
- Website: kennykingston.org

Kenny Kingston (February 15, 1927 – June 30, 2014) was an American psychic who described himself as a psychic medium. He is sometimes referred to as a "psychic to the stars" due to his extensive contact with celebrities.

== Career ==
Clients for Kingston's psychic readings included John Wayne, Harry S. Truman, Dwight D. Eisenhower, Rex Harrison, Lucille Ball, Marilyn Monroe, Whoopi Goldberg and Greta Garbo. Kingston operated a for-profit psychic reading website.

== Personal life ==
Kingston was born in Buffalo, New York on February 15, 1927. Kingston died of cardiovascular disease on June 30, 2014 in Studio City, Los Angeles. His partner of 35 years was Valerie Porter.

== Works ==
- Sweet Spirits. 1978. ISBN 978-0-8092-7625-7.
- Psychic Kenny Kingston's Guide to Health and Happiness. 1984. ISBN 978-0-931413-10-0.
- I Still Talk to... 2000. ISBN 978-0-929765-79-2.
- Making Your Goals a Reality. 2001. ISBN 978-0-929765-21-1.

== See also ==
- John Holland (psychic)
- Madalyn Aslan
- Gordon Smith (psychic medium)
- Theresa Caputo
