= Three Wishes (American TV series) =

- Created by: Andrew Glassman; Jason Raff
- Starring: Amy Grant; Carter Oosterhouse; Eric Stromer; Diane Mizota; Amanda Miller
- Country of origin: United States
- Original language: English
- No. of seasons: 1
- No. of episodes: 10

Production
- Producer: Mike Aho
- Production companies: Glassman Media; June Road Productions; Furry Prawn Productions; NBC Universal Television Studio

Original release
- Network: NBC
- Release: September 23 – December 9, 2005

Three Wishes is a reality television show that premiered on NBC on September 23, 2005 to December 9, 2005. It featured contemporary Christian musician Amy Grant as she traveled around the country fulfilling the big wishes and dreams of some needy small-town residents.

The show comes into a town, takes over the town square to take wishes at their "Wish Tent", and then films the episode in the following days. During this time, a free concert and carnival are held at which Amy Grant (and often another artist, such as Hootie and the Blowfish) performs. Though Grant's music was heard in most episodes, it was only through brief excerpts of her live performances and the show's theme song, "Believe", as Grant did not want to use the series to promote her own music. Casting is held well in advance of taking wishes in order to determine suitability for filming at the location.

The series ended after ten episodes due to disappointing ratings. It also aired on CityTV in Canada.

== Episodes ==
No.	Title	Original release date
1	"Sonora, California"	September 23, 2005
Once an active young athlete, a life threatening car accident left Abby Castleberry disfigured and needing to wear a helmet to protect part of her exposed skull from further injury. Her wishes included an operation to help her skull heal, help with her medical bills, and once again being able to compete in sports like swimming, softball, and gymnastics. While Abby met with doctors about the operation, the Wish Team worked on a secret surprise for her at home: a new backyard fitness center/playhouse, so that Abby could get back to being a strong, athletic girl. When Abby arrived home, she was thrilled with her new fitness center including an exercise pool from Endless Pools. Second, a teacher-coach who is ailing and wishes for a better field for her school and her students. Finally, a young boy wants to thank his stepfather for stepping in when his father died and wants to be legally adopted by him.
2	"Clovis, New Mexico"	September 30, 2005
In Clovis, New Mexico, Amy and her crew help out a local Little League Baseball team, a single mother, and a young girl who beat medical odds who longs to help other sick children in her town. Also, Ryan Shupe & the RubberBand sing their song "Dream Big".
3	"Brookings, South Dakota"	October 7, 2005
The Wish Team helps to relocate a family displaced by Hurricane Katrina, helping out an aspiring singer, and giving a surprise reunion for a terminally ill father.
4	"Le Mars, Iowa"	October 14, 2005
The Wish Team travels to Le Mars, Iowa to grant the wishes deserving people. First is a young woman who thought that she would never walk again. Next, a wish is granted to a married couple whose lives were changed by a fire. And finally, the team grants the wish of an aspiring dancer.
5	"Covington, Georgia"	October 21, 2005
The Wish Team travels to Covington, Georgia where they grant the wishes of a woman in search of her birth mother, a group of spirited seniors who want to recapture their youth, and a college student with a chronic stutter who must give an important speech. Special guest appearances by NASCAR drivers Tony Stewart and Wally Dallenbach Jr., and Hootie & the Blowfish.
6	"Brook Park, Ohio"	October 28, 2005
The Wish Team honors Marines who are returning home from Iraq; a soldier meets his son for the first time; a soldier's widow receives a brand new home and country music star Craig Morgan makes an appearance.
7	"Cedar City, Utah"	November 4, 2005
The Wish Team travels to Cedar City, Utah, where they have several surprises in store for a remarkable retired couple who make toys for underprivileged children all over the world. Also, they help a young girl pay tribute to the fire department whose instruction saved her life, and help a courageous young mother gain the skills and confidence she needs to better face the challenges brought on by the recent loss of her sight. World-class climber and author Erik Weihenmayer, the first blind man in history to reach the summit of the world's highest peak Mount Everest makes a special guest appearance.
8	"Dover, Ohio-New Philadelphia, Ohio"	November 11, 2005
The Wish Team travels to New Philadelphia-Dover, Ohio to help a young trainer, Shane Burgess, who gets water for the high school football team, become the hero at the homecoming game. They also help a selfless young girl who collected over 6,000 books for her Girl Scout project who wishes for a library for her town, and finally students wish to save the job of their beloved music teacher who is losing her hearing and going deaf. Singer Brandi Carlile and Cleveland Browns football player Phil Dawson make a special appearances.
9	"Christmas Wishes"	December 2, 2005
Children's holiday wishes include asking for snow in Los Angeles, a visit to the set of Sesame Street, replacing toys lost to Hurricane Katrina, swimming with dolphins, and seeing a grandmother get out of her wheelchair.
10	"I Wish to Be Bill Gates"	December 9, 2005
Three kids get a taste of their dream jobs. A 10-year-old boy gets to take on the role of CEO of Microsoft for a day, a 12-year-old gets to learn about being an astronaut at Space Camp, and a girl who wants to be an actress gets to appear on the daytime series Passions.
