= Larry Seidlin =

American judge (born 1950)

- Born: May 24, 1950 (age 76)
- Education: Hunter College
- Occupation: Judge
- Spouse: Belinda Ray Seidlin
- Children: 1 daughter

Larry Seidlin (born May 24, 1950) is an American judge.

He was a State Court judge for the Circuit Court of the Seventeenth Judicial Circuit of the State of Florida in and for Broward County. He was the presiding judge during the infamous Anna Nicole Smith body custody hearing after her death. Among other institutions, Seidlin received his education at Hunter College.

== Personal life ==
Seidlin is Jewish. He is married to Belinda Ray Seidlin; they have one daughter.

== Anna Nicole Smith trial ==
During the Anna Nicole Smith body custody hearing, Seidlin made one-line jokes, and other attempts at humor, led to speculation his actions were for the cameras and an attempt to secure a court TV show similar to Judge Judy's. Seidlin gave his judgment in what some viewed as an overly theatrical style, weeping and fumbling his words, though a lifelong friend said his conduct was genuine. South Florida lawyers said Seidlin has often been comical and his courtroom antics served to relax participants in the process.

Seidlin came under criticism in the legal community for his handling of the case. In February 2007, WSVN-TV Channel 7 reported Seidlin took three-hour lunch breaks, on the four days in April he was tailed by the station's investigative team. WSVN showed that he was at a tennis club by 4 p.m. on three of the four days he was watched. He declined to comment for the TV report.

== Resignation and rumored television show ambitions ==
Seidlin retired from the bench in summer 2007. His alleged intentions to star in a courtroom TV show were reported by the celebrity gossip website TMZ.com, citing "unidentified sources" as early as February 20, 2007. In a letter to Florida Governor Charlie Crist in June 2007, Seidlin wrote: "It is now time for me to devote more of my daily life to my own young family and to pursue the many opportunities that have been offered to me outside the judicial system and I have disregarded until now...While these opportunities are varied, they all share in common a further commitment to helping my fellow citizens through roles in the educational system, the media and nonprofit organizations."

Seidlin did not give details on his plans after his resignation, but according to Broadcasting & Cable magazine, Seidlin had allegedly cut a deal with CBS Television Distribution (CTD) to develop a court show in fall 2008, but no official confirmation was made from either party. CBS Paramount will allegedly produce Seidlin's pilot for CTD; they also handle Judy Sheindlin's Judge Judy show.

On Saturday Night Live sketches during the Smith case, Larry Seidlin was portrayed by Fred Armisen.

== Corruption controversy ==
Seidlin was criminally investigated for "allegedly asking a lawyer for gifts and financially exploiting an elderly woman." In February 2007, former Florida attorney Jack Thompson of Coral Gables, Florida filed a formal complaint against Seidlin to the Judicial Qualifications Commission for "violating almost every judicial canon." The complaint was based on an investigative report in a local weekly newspaper that reported the judge had received bribes in turn for public defender appointments on court cases. After an investigation by the Miami-Dade State Attorney's Office, Seidlin was cleared of any wrongdoing in January 2009.

== Elder-abuse lawsuit and settlement ==
In March 2009, Corine Kasler, the niece of an elderly widow Barbara M. Kasler (83), accused Seidlin and his wife of accepting inappropriate gifts from the mentally impaired elderly woman. Tha family of the late Mrs. Kasler reached a settlement in October 2011. Seidlin, his wife, and his in laws lived in the same building as Kasler whose wealth was estimated $5m, according to the lawsuit. The confidential settlement was signed by Larry Seidlin, his wife, in laws, Kasler family. Mrs. Kasler gave the Seidlins $500,000 in gifts and cash. Elderly widow also paid $50,000 for private school education of the Seidlin's daughter.
