= The Adam Carolla Show (podcast) =

Comedy podcast

- Genre: Comedy
- Language: English

Cast and voices
- Hosted by: Adam Carolla

Production
- Production: Mike Dawson
- Length: 1 hour, 30 minutes (approximate)

Publication
- Original release: February 23, 2009
- Provider: Carolla Digital
- Updates: Weekdays, Monday-Thursday

Reception
- Cited as: 2009 iTunes Podcast of the Year

Related
- Preceded by: The Adam Carolla Show (2006–2009)
- Website: adamcarolla.com

The Adam Carolla Show (formerly The Adam Carolla Podcast) is a comedy podcast hosted by comedian and radio-television personality Adam Carolla. Its first episode went online on February 23, 2009. The show is the flagship program of Carolla Digital.

== Initial format and response ==
The first episode of the show, which was at the time titled The Adam Carolla Podcast, was released on Feb. 23, 2009—just days after his terrestrial radio program on KLSX ended. The format of the podcast was different from that of the radio show on which it was based. The podcast, while released consistently each weekday, featured a minimal amount of production and was less structured. Episodes were generally a dialog between Carolla and one or more guests. While there were no regular co-hosts, regular guests from the radio show, including Drew Pinsky, Teresa Strasser, Dave Dameshek and Bryan Bishop, began making frequent appearances. Listener call-in was gradually added to the show and Carolla began using language that FCC restrictions prohibit on terrestrial radio.

In its first 24 hours of release, the premiere episode was downloaded over 250,000 times. As of the third episode, the show was the number one podcast on the iTunes Store in both the U.S. and Canada. During the debut week, the podcast recorded 1.6 million downloads. In the second week it recorded 2.4 million downloads. By the second week of the show, the fourth episode of the podcast featuring former radio show sidekick Dave Dameshek was downloaded over 500,000 times.

In its first year, The Adam Carolla Podcast was selected as the Best Audio Podcast of 2009 by iTunes.

== Current format ==
In 2010, the show was significantly restructured to more closely resemble the format of Carolla's radio show while still retaining full creative control and freedom from FCC restrictions. Several production members and on-air talent from the radio show returned. Included among these were producer Angie Fitzsimmons, co-hosts Teresa Strasser and Bryan Bishop, and announcer Mike Dawson. Regular news segments returned to the program with comedic commentary. Featured segments returned, such as "What Can't Adam Complain About?", "Totally Topical Tivo Trivia", and "Blah Blah Blog". Shows continue to feature a celebrity guest, with the guest frequently participating in the featured segments and joining the commentary on the news. The change in format premiered on May 31, 2010, with guest voice actor Billy West. Along with the change in format, the title of the show was changed to The Adam Carolla Show.

On August 19, 2010, Strasser joined the Peter Tilden Show on KABC Radio and reduced her role on The Adam Carolla Show. With Strasser's occasional absence, Carolla began returning to the podcast's original host-and-guest-only interview style, beginning with episodes featuring Morgan Spurlock and David Cross. In early 2011, Alison Rosen formally replaced Strasser as co-host and took over responsibility of the news desk.

In early 2012, Carolla's founding partner, Donny Misraje, was terminated by Carolla. Misraje subsequently filed a lawsuit against Carolla.

On January 5, 2015, Carolla announced that Alison Rosen would no longer be a part of the show, explaining that she was a good comic lead, but not a good sidekick. Rosen was replaced by terrestrial radio personality Gina Grad, whom Carolla considers a good sidekick and not necessarily a separate comedic voice. Remarking on the differences between Rosen and Grad, Carolla said, "I think Alison Rosen is very talented and very funny. I think she's a great writer and I think she's a great comedic voice, but I don't think she's a great sidekick ... I don't think that's her calling ... she's better as a lead than a sidekick." About Grad, Carolla said she's great because, "I don't need that much out of that role, I really don't, I just need them to ... be there ... in a good mood [and] funny is nice ... but it's not something that I've ever really needed, I think [Gina] fits in perfectly."

As of 2018, each show is split into two parts in an effort to increase downloads and ad revenue, which has been unpopular with listeners.

On January 3, 2023, Carolla abruptly announced during the monologue that he had decided for Gina Grad and Bryan Bishop to leave the show "...but in a good way" and that he intended to "make changes" to the format of the show.

== Recurring guests ==
The Adam Carolla Show often features recurring guests. Comedians Larry Miller, Jo Koy (whom Carolla jokingly calls "Joy"), David Alan Grier, Dana Gould, and Greg Fitzsimmons are often recurring guests with their own characters and improvised comedy situations that are often featured. Vinnie Tortorich also appears at least monthly to discuss health and fitness, among other things.

Examples include David Alan Grier singing as Teddy Pendergrass and Larry Miller's hypothetical road trip. Gould and Carolla often go back to similar comedic subjects such as impersonating Huell Howser clips from his show on PBS.

== Segments and themes ==
The podcast often opens with Carolla sharing anecdotes from his personal life. Often these stories turn into one of Carolla's many characteristic rants about the California Highway Patrol, turning left against red lights, passion fruit flavoring, or the stupidity of people he deals with. These rants are sometimes fueled by things fans have tweeted him.

Usually, but not always, around the middle of the show they have another segment. During live gigs these are often games like "Blah Blah Blog" or "Totally Topical Tivo Trivia". Sometimes Bald Bryan will do a film review in his Baldywood segment. Occasionally Dave Dameshek will come in and do sports news, often ending in some rant or riff between him and Carolla. Dameshek became a regular feature with Carolla in a segment called Good Sports, which has been cancelled.

After this Carolla usually brings in the guest if he hasn't already. Sometimes this segment will be a more formal interview and other times it will be one of the recurring guests or comedians improvising or conversing with Carolla. Guests vary from actors, comedians, athletes and occasionally politicians who will then sit in and "crack wise" with Carolla to Gina Grad's news, ending out the show.

== Guinness world record ==
In May 2011, the show became the Guinness World Record holder for the most downloaded podcast after receiving 59,574,843 unique downloads from March 2009 to March 16, 2011, apparently overtaking the previous record set by The Ricky Gervais Show. However, Gervais's show, which has far fewer episodes, had received more than 300 million unique downloads by March 2011 (about 5 times Corolla's claimed record), a fact not acknowledged by Guinness World Records, as most record claimants must now pay to have their records recognized. Regardless, Stuff You Should Know has since gone on to receive more than a billion unique downloads, including 30 million downloads per month; and Joe Rogan claims that his podcast, The Joe Rogan Experience, has 190 million unique downloads per month. Nevertheless, Edison Research found that The Adam Carolla Show was the world's 49th-most-listened-to podcast in 2020, and Rogan's the 1st-most-listened.

== Controversies ==
On the April 4, 2010 episode of The Adam Carolla Show, Carolla referred to Filipino boxer Manny Pacquiao as being illiterate, having brain damage, and being someone who prays to chicken bones. He continued with insulting commentary on the Philippines, where Pacquiao makes his home, saying, "They got this and sex tours, that's all they have over there. Get your shit together, Philippines. Jesus Christ. I mean, again, it's fine to be proud of your countrymen. But that's it? That's all you got?" Filipino leaders, including the office of President Gloria Arroyo, responded to the incident. Carolla later apologized via Twitter, saying, "Read your comments. Sorry if I offended many of you. I don't preplan my commentary. I try to be provocative [and] funny but I crossed the line and I'm sorry."

In August 2011, Carolla attracted criticism from the Gay & Lesbian Alliance Against Defamation after an episode of The Adam Carolla Show in which, referring to transgender people, he asked, "When did we start giving a shit about these people?" He went on to say that the LGBT moniker ought to be replaced with "YUCK," and that LGBT advocates ought to "shut up." GLAAD also pointed to previous remarks made by Carolla, including asserting that he would rather his children be raised by a heterosexual couple rather than a homosexual couple if anything were to happen to him and his wife. Carolla responded to GLAAD via TMZ.com, stating, "I'm sorry my comments were hurtful. I'm a comedian, not a politician."

== Other shows ==
In July 2009, Carolla introduced a new automotive-oriented podcast, called CarCast. Other shows featuring Carolla include Ace on the House, The Adam and Dr. Drew Show, and Take a Knee. Carolla has also appeared as a guest on Doug Benson's Doug Loves Movies podcast, on Marc Maron's WTF podcast, and as a guest on The Nerdist podcast with Chris Hardwick.
