= The Tim Conway Jr. Show =

- Genre: News talk
- Running time: 3 hours (including commercials)
- Country of origin: United States
- Home station: KFI
- Starring: Tim Conway Jr.
- Executive producer: Sheron Bellio
- Website: kfiam640.iheart.com/featured/tim-conway-jr

The Tim Conway Jr. Show is a weeknight talk radio program, currently web streaming and broadcasting throughout the Los Angeles County and Orange County, California metropolitan areas at KFI AM 640. The show runs from 6 p.m. to 10 p.m. Pacific Time and is hosted by Tim Conway, Jr.

Conway rose to popularity as a longtime host on former FM talk station KLSX, first teamed with Doug Steckler who was followed as co-host by Brian Whitman. After the 2008 departure of Whitman, Conway hosted solo rather than adopting a new co-host. On February 19, 2009, both Whitman and Steckler were special guests on Conway's last show before KLSX flipped the format to Top-40.

== Show host ==
Tim Conway, Jr. is the son of the late American television and film comedian Tim Conway, and then wife Mary Ann. Tim Conway, Jr. resides in Burbank, California with his wife.

== KFI ==
Conway's weeknight show at KFI began on Monday, January 18, 2010, after Bryan Suits, who previously hosted the show at that time slot, decided to move back to Seattle. In line with the majority of KFI's programming, Conway discusses political topics with a comical libertarian slant. Through July 17, 2015, on Friday nights, Conway was joined by comedian/writer Doug Steckler, his former co-host on KLSX. On many Tuesday nights Conway is joined by Mark Thompson. Conway often jokes about his costly love of gambling, especially his (usually) losing bets on the horses. He also retrospectively claims to have said, done, or is currently doing things, he has never actually done, in a completely believable manner.

On May 25, 2021, Conway, Jr., and his producer, Sheron Bellio, were suspended for a skit that used racist stereotypes of Asian Americans during Asian American and Pacific Islander Heritage Month.

== Conway and Whitman ==
Conway and Whitman
- Genre: Comedy, Talk
- Running time: 3 hours (including commercials)
- Country of origin: United States
- Home station: KLSX
- Starring: Tim Conway Jr. Brian Whitman
- Written by: Randy Wang
- Produced by: Gina Grad, Randy Wang, Gerry Wachovsky (left the show in 2008)
- Original release: 2005 – 2008
- Website: TimConwayJr

Conway and Whitman was a CBS Radio evening talk radio program, web streaming and broadcasting throughout the Los Angeles and Orange County, California metropolitan areas at 97.1 Free FM (KLSX). The show ran from 8 p.m. to 11 p.m. Pacific Time, Monday through Friday, hosted by Tim Conway Jr. and Brian Whitman. After the March 2008 departure of Whitman, the show reverted to The Tim Conway Jr. Show rather than adopting a new co-host and remained that way until 2009 when KLSX flipped formats.
