= Eric Stromer =

American television personality

- Born: 28 April 1961 (age 65)
- Spouse: Amy Tinkham
- Children: 3
- Presenting career
- Show: Top Gear
- Station: NBC
- Show: Over Your Head
- Country: United States

Eric Antony Stromer (born April 28, 1961) is an American actor and television personality. He was a co-host for the motoring television series, Top Gear, on NBC. He was raised in Evanston, Illinois.

== Career ==
Stromer started acting at the age of 7 doing a Kit Kat commercial. He lost out of the role of Henry Desmond to Peter Scolari in the Tom Hanks sitcom Bosom Buddies. He is the host of Over Your Head, the primary carpenter on Clean Sweep, also making appearances on Trading Spaces. He is also the co-host of Adam Carolla's home improvement podcast, Ace on the House, dispensing home improvement advice to callers.

== Cancer ==
On February 28, 2011, Stromer related, on an episode of The Doctors, that radiography following a car accident in which he was involved uncovered a tumor on his thyroid gland. He was diagnosed with papillary cancer and had his entire thyroid removed. He is in remission.

== Family ==
Stromer is married to Amy Tinkham. They have three children.

== Filmography ==
Film roles
Year	Title	Role	Notes
1996	The Acting Thing	Eric	
1996	Grace of My Heart	Doris' L.A. Boyfriend	
1999	Tycus	Phillers	
1999	Valerie Flake	Adonis Plumber	

Television roles
Year	Title	Role	Notes
1984	Santa Barbara	Michael Adams	7 episodes
1990	Freddy's Nightmares	Otto	1 episode
2003–2005	Clean Sweep	himself	14 episodes
2005	Three Wishes	himself	10 episodes
2006	The Tony Danza Show	himself	1 episode
2006	The Megan Mullally Show	himself	2 episodes
2007	Rachael Ray	himself	1 episode
2008	Top Gear	Himself – Presenter	Unaired Pilot
2008	Home for the Holidays	himself	TV movie
2008–2009	HGTV Showdown	himself	2 episodes
2009–2011	Over Your Head	himself	24 episodes
2010	Cut It in Half: Airplane	himself	TV movie
2007–2010	Home Improvement with Eric Stromer	Himself – Host	32 episodes
2011	The Doctors	himself	1 episode
2012	Today	himself	1 episode
2012	Hideous Houses	himself	8 episode
2012–2013	Marie	himself	3 episodes
