= Josh Skinner =

American actor & songwriter

Josh Skinner is an American television producer, director, host, and songwriter based in Los Angeles, California. He is a Streamy Award winner (producer) and has worked across broadcast, streaming, and digital platforms for companies including Sony Pictures Television, NBCUniversal, Crackle, Lifetime Television, and The Walt Disney Company. As a songwriter, his work spans pop, R&B, and dance music, with collaborators including Grammy-winning producer Jason Evigan, Jeff Timmons of 98 Degrees, and recording artists Sir Ivan, Kimberley Locke, Sara Lumholdt of A*Teens, and Alessandra Rosaldo.

== Early life and education ==
Skinner was born in Los Angeles and moved to Hawaii when he was 7 years old. He studied Radio, Television & Film with a minor in Biblical Studies at Biola University in La Mirada, California, graduating with a Bachelor of Arts in 2003.

== Career ==
=== The Walt Disney Company (1999–2014) ===
Skinner began his entertainment career at The Walt Disney Company as a member of the American Guild of Variety Artists (AGVA), performing and storytelling across multiple productions at the Disneyland Resort in Anaheim, California. He originated a role at Disney California Adventure’s Animation Building, playing a Disney animator whose in-progress presentation is comically disrupted by Mushu, the dragon from Mulan. He later became an evening storytelling traveler at Disney’s Grand Californian Hotel, weaving original narratives for guests in the hotel’s signature rustic lobby.

Over the course of more than a decade, Skinner performed in more than 15 distinct Disney productions and was considered a “swing” — a versatile performer called upon to fill a variety of roles across different shows as needed. His work also extended to high-profile special events, including Miley Cyrus’ 16th birthday celebration at Disneyland, Disneyland Resort’s 50th anniversary, and international print campaigns for the resort.

=== Warner Bros. Studios (2014–2016) ===
From 2014 to 2016, Skinner worked at Warner Bros. Studios in Burbank, California, in a role that combined on-camera expertise, social media, and creative writing. He spearheaded and co-created the Friends Interactive Guest Experience at Stage 48 — a live, immersive storytelling experience set on the original Central Perk set from the iconic television series Friends — collaborating closely with former Warner Bros. Friends expert Jessica Hurtado to bring the concept to life for Warner Bros. Studio Tour guests.

Among his other responsibilities, Skinner led a team that managed the logistics of moving more than 200 audience members across the Warner Bros. lot to the stage for Conan (TBS) and safely back again. He has spoken warmly of Conan O’Brien as one of the most genuinely kind figures he encountered during his time there, noting that O’Brien regularly invited tour staff to enjoy his famously top-tier Wednesday pre-show catering.

Skinner has described the Conan role as a turning point. Determined to build a career on the production side, he made the decision to leave Warner Bros. and start over. He accepted a three-day position as a Production Assistant on NBC’s Hollywood Game Night — a choice that surprised friends and family who questioned the wisdom of walking away from a stable job for a temporary one. Skinner was undeterred, believing that if he worked hard enough, another opportunity would come before those three days were up. It did: by the end of the assignment, he had three job offers. He accepted a position on the Lionsgate/CBS game show Candy Crush, hosted by Mario Lopez.

Skinner credits executive producers Matt Kunitz and Josh Silberman with giving him a comprehensive education in how a television production operates from development through post. He was among the first crew members hired and stayed with the show through completion. During production, his primary on-set responsibilities placed him alongside Lopez and his team. Skinner has described Lopez as a consummate professional — a family man who was consistently accommodating, punctual, and respectful to everyone on set, from crew to talent. Lopez also went out of his way to arrange a meeting between Skinner and Warner Bros. Television so executives could hear a pitch Skinner had been developing alongside a producer from Super Soul Sunday.

=== Broadcast Production (2017–2019) ===
Skinner transitioned into network television production beginning in 2017. At NBCUniversal, he coordinated cast logistics for Better Late Than Never Season 2, an international travel series featuring William Shatner, Terry Bradshaw, Henry Winkler, George Foreman, and Jeff Dye, filmed across Europe. During production in Germany — shortly after the May 2017 bombing at an Ariana Grande concert in Manchester, England, which had heightened security awareness across Europe — a concern involving fans arose at a location where Skinner and Foreman were present. Security moved both men quickly into a vehicle. It was Foreman who broke the tension, steering the conversation toward pancakes. The exchange ultimately led to Foreman asking Skinner to contact his wife with Skinner’s recommendation: macadamia nut pancakes with fluffy syrup from Boot’s & Kimo’s Homestyle Kitchen. Skinner has told the story many times since.

He subsequently joined Lifetime Television Network as a talent coordinator on Glam Masters, a makeup competition series created by Kim Kardashian and hosted by Laverne Cox. He produced the Kim Kardashian Disney Princess Jasmine Transformation segment featuring acclaimed makeup artist Kandee Johnson — a segment that went on to win a Streamy Award.

In 2018, Skinner produced segments for Angel Brinks: The Real Bling at Monami Entertainment in Beverly Hills. Originally conceived as a television pilot before being repackaged as a special, the project gave Skinner an early window into the more manipulative undercurrents of reality television — an experience he found at odds with his instincts. It was also, he has said, where he first began to recognize the difference between people with a genuine story to tell and those simply chasing a camera. Of Angel Brinks herself, Skinner has been unequivocal: she is, in his words, a real-life angel.

Skinner joined Sony Pictures Television as a development producer in 2018, where he developed Murder House Flip, a docuseries acquired by Quibi (later Roku). The series earned two American Reality Television Award nominations.

=== The GloZell Show and One Good Man Productions (2020–2021) ===
From 2020 to 2021, Skinner served as Executive Producer and Director on The GloZell Show, a project created by Lisa Freberg of One Good Man Productions — a fun yet educational series built around financial literacy. The connection between Skinner and GloZell ran deeper than a professional arrangement: Skinner had conducted GloZell’s very first interview, and their years of mutual trust — rooted in part in a shared faith — meant that when it came time to produce the show, GloZell personally chose him as her director and producer. She has been candid that she would not have done the show with anyone else.

One of the creative choices Skinner made was to build a storyline around what had previously been GloZell’s Vanity Fair secret — that despite her public profile, she had faced serious financial hardship. Even the house used for filming was not her own. The show was intended to run a full season, but production was cut short by the COVID-19 pandemic. It was ultimately released as a special.

=== Crackle and Independent Production (2021–2022) ===
In 2021, Skinner reunited with Lisa Freberg of One Good Man Productions for a new venture. Freberg, whose producing instincts and creative vision had already shaped the GloZell project, brought Skinner in to develop an ambitious original docuseries in collaboration with Crackle. Together, they secured celebrity talent, pitched to network executives, and oversaw all phases of development through pre-production. Over the course of approximately a year, the team held weekly collaborative meetings with the network and built partnerships with major companies around the series. The project came to an abrupt halt when Crackle shifted the strategic direction of the network, catching Freberg, Skinner, and the entire team off guard after more than a year of sustained work.

== Songwriting ==
Skinner has described songwriting and interviewing as his two primary creative passions, both of which have been shaped by personal experiences and loss throughout his life. His writing explores themes of extreme personal growth, resilience through heartbreak, and the pursuit of inspiration — with the aim of giving listeners hope and encouraging accountability in one’s choices and actions. He has also written dance songs that allow him to move fluidly across genres.

=== Early collaborations ===
Through much of 2008, Skinner collaborated with Swedish pop star Sara Lumholdt of A*Teens on an album recorded in Los Angeles. Twelve songs were completed, with the lead single “First” officially released. A second song, “Kiss Me Goodbye,” has been reported playing on radio in Norway and surrounding countries despite never receiving an official release — a circumstance Skinner has acknowledged as puzzling. The full album was ultimately not released due to timing. Skinner and Lumholdt maintained a close personal friendship; he traveled to Sweden to attend her wedding.

One of the most personally and artistically significant collaborations of Skinner’s career began when he was brought in to write for Mexican actress, singer, and television personality Alessandra Rosaldo — best known internationally for her role in the film Instructions Not Included and as a founding member of the beloved Mexican electro-pop group Sentidos Opuestos, which sold over four million records worldwide across a two-decade career. The project brought together Skinner, Sara Lumholdt, Jeff Timmons of 98 Degrees, and veteran producer Ted Perlman — the session that first connected Skinner and Timmons as songwriting partners.

The collaboration with Rosaldo deepened well beyond the studio. Over months of working together, Skinner and Rosaldo developed a close friendship, confiding in one another about their personal lives and relationships. The bilingual English and Spanish songs they created together drew directly from those conversations, making the work unusually personal for both of them. Skinner has cited Rosaldo as a defining figure in his life and career — crediting her love, cultural passion, and authenticity with inspiring him to think more expansively about the reach of music. Her belief that the right group of people, united by genuine feeling, could move the world through music, love, heartbreak, and growth — themes that transcend language — became a guiding principle in his songwriting.

Rosaldo was also a source of support for Skinner during an unexpected personal loss. In response, he co-wrote a song dedicated to her alongside actor and songwriter Joseph Morales, who portrayed Alexander Hamilton in the long-running Broadway production of Hamilton. The song was never commercially released and was understood to be a private expression of gratitude.

Two songs from the Rosaldo collaboration — “Por Tu Amor” and “Eres” — were featured in her international telenovela Ni contigo ni sin ti (130 episodes) and were performed as the theme of her televised wedding to Spanish actor and filmmaker Eugenio Derbez in Mexico City in July 2012.

== Podcasting and digital media (2018–2023) ==
In 2018, Skinner co-created and hosted Jonah and the Whale alongside his friend of 32 years, John Pfaender, through the Nashville-based Lasting Media Group. The long-form celebrity interview podcast evolved into a deeply personal passion project for both of them. Over four seasons, the show drew an outpouring of listener correspondence — letters and messages from people describing how the podcast had helped them through difficult times, and in some cases, had saved their lives. For the Season 4 premiere, they welcomed Carnie Wilson as their guest — an episode that reportedly moved audiences to tears. Jonah and the Whale received coverage in People Magazine, Billboard, Yahoo News, and Entertainment Tonight Canada. Skinner also Executive Produced Glowing Up, a podcast hosted by GloZell, overseeing talent booking and writing.

From 2019 to 2023, Skinner served as executive producer and host for the American Influencer Awards producing over 60 interviews for a podcast dedicated to the American Influencer Awards. Notable guests included Caitlyn Jenner, David Archuleta, Rebecca Zamolo, and the parents of Ethan Peters — the influencer known online as "Ethan Is Supreme", who had died from an accidental drug overdose. Rather than fly to Texas for that interview, Skinner chose to drive, using the time on the road to think carefully about how to approach the conversation with the family — mindful of honoring Ethan's story and legacy while also being honest about the dangers of drug use. He has said many times that he remains in contact with the Peters family to this day.

Skinner co-wrote "Sirens" with Kimberley Locke and producer Russell Ali, and co-wrote Locke's "Endless Possibilities," which debuted at the 2013 Writers and Illustrators of the Future Awards in Los Angeles.

=== Sir Ivan Collaboration ===
Skinner co-wrote the dance single "La La Land" with Sir Ivan, producer Russell Ali, and Grammy-winning producer Jason Evigan. The song spent nine weeks on the Billboard charts, reached number 10 on the UK Music Week Upfront Club Chart, and broke into the Top 20 on the DJ Times National Crossover Pool Chart. Sir Ivan’s castle in the Hamptons served as the inspiration for the song’s central conceit — an idealized, dreamlike place Skinner imagined living — a concept developed prior to the 2016 film of the same name.

Sir Ivan, a philanthropist, donates proceeds from his music to nonprofit organizations.

=== Collaboration with Jeff Timmons (2021–present) ===
The songwriting partnership between Skinner and Jeff Timmons — a founding member of the Grammy-nominated group 98 Degrees — grew out of their early work together on the Alessandra Rosaldo project and evolved into an active and ongoing creative collaboration beginning in 2021. Together they have written across pop, R&B, and dance genres.

The track "Love it the Piece" was recorded in 2025 during a personally challenging period in which Skinner was navigating significant health problems. The circumstances made the writing process difficult at times, with much of his participation taking place through remote video sessions. Sir Ivan released the song on January 26, 2026; it was co-written by Sir Ivan, Skinner, and Timmons, who also produced.

=== Additional projects ===
As of 2026, Skinner is also collaborating with ten-time Grammy nominee Dave Koz on an inspirational project.

== Talk shows and hosting ==
In Fall 2012, Skinner stepped in as co-host and Executive Producer of the daytime talk show Good Morning 90210 alongside Raylene Bartolacci on the FilmOn Network, replacing the previous celebrity co-host due to creative differences. The show ran for 15 episodes before being cancelled, leaving behind a behind-the-scenes story as colorful as its cast. He has also appeared on Live Like a Star and On-Air with Ryan Seacrest (Fox).

Skinner hosted an online interview series in which he spoke with a wide range of notable pop culture figures, including Kris Jenner, Sherri Shepherd, American Idol winner Kris Allen, CNN anchor Don Lemon, Lt. Dan Choi, and the final on-camera interview with Eleanor Mondale.

== Film ==
Skinner produced and co-starred in the short film Rules of the Game alongside Oscar nominee Bruce Davison, and played a supporting role in the feature film Confession (2005) starring Chris Pine. He also appeared in the 2016 comedy Do Over, playing the role of Roderick alongside Jonathan Bennett (Mean Girls), Gina Field, Drew Seeley, and Amy Paffrath. Given the film’s premise — characters reuniting with the person they lost their virginity to — Skinner has noted with good humor that he chose not to screen it for his family, as his father is a minister.

== Filmography ==
- Ellen's Design Challenge (2016) played "Himself"
- Good Morning 90210 "co-host" (15 episodes, 2012)
- Cinemania (1 episode, "The Day the Earth Stood Still", 2008) played "Contestant/self"
- Confession (2005) played "Ricky"
- Knock First (1 episode, "Celebrity Edition: Kimberley Locke", 2005) played "Himself"
- Live Like a Star (1 episode, "Idol-ization", 2004) played "Himself" (1 episode, 2004)
- Rules of the Game (2003) played "Wayne/Clerk" (also credited as associate producer)
- Stuck (2003) played "Shakespeare teacher"
- The Color of War (1 episode, "Price of War", 2001) played "Carl Peterson"
- Who Knows the Band? (1 episode, 2001) played "Lance Bass' Friend"
- Fantasy Island (1 episode, "Secret Self", 1998) played "Talk Show Troubled Teen"
- The Byrds of Paradise (1 episode, "This Band Is My Band", 1994) played "Franny's Friend"

== Music ==
- 2008: "First" - Sara Lumholdt (co-writer)
- 2008: "Mr. Right Now" - Sara Lumholdt (co-writer)
- 2008: "Kiss Me Goodbye" - Sara Lumholdt (co-writer)
- 2009: "Learn to Love" - Eddie Kaulukukui (co-writer)
- 2009: "Journey of a Broken Heart" - Eddie Kaulukukui (co-writer)
- 2009: "One Voice" - Eddie Kaulukukui (co-writer)
- 2009: "Fallen Angel" - Eddie Kaulukukui (co-writer)
- 2009: "Coming Home" - Eddie Kaulukukui (co-writer)
- 2010: "Breathless" - Alessandra Rosaldo (co-writer)
- 2010: "Eres" - Alessandra Rosaldo (co-writer)
- 2010: "Did You Lie" - Alessandra Rosaldo (co-writer)
- 2010: "No Diga Mas" - Alessandra Rosaldo (co-writer)
- 2010: "You Told Me" - Alessandra Rosaldo (co-writer)
- 2010: "Good Morning, Goodbye" - Alessandra Rosaldo (co-writer)
- 2010: "Holding On" - Alessandra Rosaldo (co-writer)
- 2010: "Por tu Amor" - Alessandra Rosaldo (co-writer)
- 2011: "Sirens (featuring Sev Sanders)" - Kimberley Locke (co-writer)
- 2011: "Sirens" (radio edit) - Kimberley Locke (co-writer)
- 2012: "La La Land" - Sir Ivan (co-writer)
- 2013: "Endless Possibilities" - Kimberley Locke (co-writer)
- 2014: "Living Off the Page" - performed by Drew Seeley and Cassie Simone
- 2014: "Off the Ground" - performed by Drew Seeley
- 2025: "Love is the Piece" performed by Sir Ivan (co-writer)
