= Bryan Bishop =

American radio personality (1978–2026)

- Born: September 13, 1978; San Carlos, California, U.S.
- Died: September 18, 2026 (aged 48); La Jolla, California, U.S.
- Other name: Bald Bryan
- Occupations: Radio personality; author
- Years active: 2002–2026
- Spouse: Christie Clough Bishop
- Children: 1
- Website: bryanbishop.com

Bryan Bishop (September 13, 1978 – September 18, 2026), also known in podcasts as Bald Bryan, was an American radio personality and author, best known for his work on The Adam Carolla Show podcast and its previous radio version.

== Early life ==
Bishop was born on September 13, 1978, and resided in San Carlos, California. He attended Junípero Serra High School in San Mateo, California, where he was a classmate of Tom Brady. Bryan graduated in 1996. Bishop majored in creative writing at the University of Southern California, where he was a founding member of the Pi Kappa Phi fraternity's Delta Rho chapter.

=== Game show appearances ===
- In 2002, Bishop was a contestant on Comedy Central's Beat the Geeks. Bishop won the final challenge in the game by defeating the "Music Geek".
- Bishop appeared on the syndicated game show Who Wants to Be a Millionaire in a two-part episode airing on December 5 and 8, 2008. He won $100,000 after losing his $250,000 question.

== Broadcasting career ==
In May 2002, Bishop began working with Adam Carolla on the radio show Loveline as a call screener. He was fired on June 2, 2005, after blogging inside details of the show.

Soon after he co-hosted a 2002 demo radio show about movies with Loveline engineer Anderson Cowan, he continued this co-hosting arrangement with a regularly scheduled program called The Film Vault, "[having a] weekly spot and occasional weekend filler."

He also worked on Adam Carolla's television show Too Late with Adam Carolla.

On January 2, 2006, Bishop began working on The Adam Carolla Show as a call screener. On May 4, 2006, Bishop filled in for Mike Lynch, the show's sound effects person, after Lynch was married. When Lynch was promoted to writer, Bishop became the show's permanent sound effects person and the call screener position was filled by Kyle Baugher. LAist described Bryan as "a sound-effects wizard, and ultra quick-witted third-man".

=== Role on The Adam Carolla Show ===
Bishop occasionally participated in both conversations and performances on the show. One of Bishop's hallmarks was providing prerecorded verbalized and audio commentary by triggering humorous and relevant sound effects. Examples of Bishop's sound effects include the "correct answer" and "incorrect answer" bells/buzzers from Family Feud, or sentences spoken by others on the show, out of context. Bishop's sound effects were often referred to as "drops" on the show.

He was notable on the show for excelling in geek culture-themed competition segments, such as "Totally Topical Tivo Trivia", "Blah, Blah, Blog", "Gay Walking", "Nerd Walking", and "The Rotten Tomatoes Game". Bishop occasionally participated in improvisational elements of the show.

Bishop's brain tumor diagnosis and his $100,000 win on Who Wants to be a Millionaire were occasionally discussed on the show.

In January 2023, Carolla announced that Bishop and co-host Gina Grad would not be returning as regulars to the podcast, but would continue to appear as guests on the program.

=== Role on The Film Vault (podcast) ===
Bishop, still co-hosting with Cowen, the "radio show-turned-podcast" launched on the Carolla-owned ACE Broadcasting Network and released its first episode on April 23, 2010. The first episode of its newly independent incarnation was released on September 16, 2011.

=== Role on The Bryan and Gina Show ===
In March 2023, Bishop began co-hosting a Los Angeles–focused podcast called The Bryan and Gina Show with Gina Grad for LA Mag.

== Personal life ==
Bryan married Christie Clough, an advertising executive, in 2009. Their daughter Tessa was born in 2016.

=== Brain tumor and death ===
On Adam Carolla's podcast in May 2009, Bishop stated he was diagnosed with an inoperable brain tumor (a low-grade glioma located in the brainstem). Keith Black, the chairman of neurosurgery at Cedars-Sinai Hospital, give Bishop a specialized team who pursued treatment involving radiation and chemotherapy. Bryan continued regular MRIs and treatment through the years. He had a brain surgery/biopsy in July 2023, as discussed on his LAMag podcast.

On October 21, 2009, Bishop appeared on Carolla's podcast and reported that a MRI showed that the tumor had shrunk significantly and that treatment was ongoing. Bishop detailed undergoing therapy using the angiogenesis inhibiting drug, Avastin. Bishop announced on the same podcast that, because he was undergoing radiation treatments which would have resulted in him becoming sterile, he made deposits at a sperm bank as a precaution in advance of his pending nuptials.

Carolla hosted a fundraiser "Laughs for Bald Bryan" in November 2009, which included performances by Jimmy Kimmel, Larry Miller, Greg Fitzsimmons, and others.

When Bishop filled in for Carolla on the July 8, 2011, edition of the podcast, he and co-host Alison Rosen discussed his diagnosis and treatment. In discussing the diagnosis, Bishop said his doctors had initially given him up to six months to a year to live. Bishop also discussed his current treatment regimen.

He wrote a book about the experience titled Shrinkage: Manhood, Marriage, and the Tumor That Tried to Kill Me, which was published by Thomas Dunne Books in April 2014, and became a New York Times best seller.

In November 2024, Bishop was approved to treat his tumor with the newly approved drug vorasidenib.

In 2026, Bishop produced and starred in a documentary, Growth.

By August 2026, Bishop's tumor had spread into his cervical spine and he revealed that he was undergoing radiotherapy. After a few sessions of radiotherapy, his wife announced on GoFundMe that Bishop had died on September 18, 2026, at the age of 48, after being hospitalized.
