= Over Your Head =

- Genre: Home and Garden
- Starring: Eric Stromer
- Country of origin: United States
- No. of seasons: 9
- No. of episodes: 105

Original release
- Network: HGTV
- Release: November 4, 2006

Over Your Head is a home improvement reality television series first broadcast on HGTV on November 4, 2006, hosted by Eric Stromer.
