= On Air with Ryan Seacrest (TV series) =

2004 American television talk show

- Genre: Talk show
- Created by: Ryan Seacrest
- Developed by: Bob McKinnon; John Stewart
- Presented by: Ryan Seacrest
- Country of origin: United States
- Original language: English

Production
- Running time: 60 minutes
- Production companies: Ryan Seacrest Productions; Larchmont Productions; 20th Television

Original release
- Network: First-run syndication
- Release: January 12 – September 17, 2004

On Air with Ryan Seacrest is an American television talk show that aired in first-run syndication from January 12 to September 17, 2004. It was distributed in the United States and Canada by Twentieth Television.

== Series background ==
The show was broadcast live from a studio in the Hollywood & Highland complex in Hollywood and featured a background view of the street scene below. The title came from his morning radio show of the same name, which also debuted in 2004 and later went nationwide as a daily syndicated radio series in 2008. It was recorded live at Noon pacific time and aired at Noon on KCOP-TV, Los Angeles' UPN affiliate & there was an encore that aired at 5:00pm on KTTV, Los Angeles' Fox affiliate.

On Air struggled in the ratings throughout its short run. It featured well-known guests, and capitalized upon the fact that host Ryan Seacrest concurrently hosted American Idol by featuring contestants who had been eliminated from the popular talent program the night before.

Seacrest would return to daytime talk television thirteen years later, when he began working in New York City on May 1, 2017, as co-host of the syndicated talk show Live with Kelly and Ryan.
