= List of programs broadcast by Comedy Central =

Current Comedy Central logo.

This is a list of television programs formerly or currently broadcast by Comedy Central in the United States and some other countries.

== Current programming ==
=== Animation ===
Title	Genre	Premiere	Seasons	Runtime	Status
South Park	Animated dark comedy	August 13, 1997	29 seasons, 344 episodes	22 min	Season 29 ongoing Renewed for seasons 30–32

=== Late night ===
Title	Genre	Premiere	Seasons	Runtime	Status
The Daily Show	Late-night talk show	July 22, 1996	4,214 episodes	22–45 min	Ongoing

=== Continuations ===
Title	Genre	Prev. networks	Premiere	Seasons	Runtime	Status
Beavis and Butt-Head (seasons 11–12)	Animated sitcom	MTV (seasons 1–8); Paramount+ (seasons 9–10)	September 3, 2025	2 seasons, 38 episodes	21–22 min	Season 12 ongoing

=== Syndicated programming ===
- Beavis and Butt-Head (2005; 2012; 2022)
- The Office (2018)
- Parks and Recreation (2019; 2023)
- Seinfeld (2021)
- Family Guy (2024)

== Former programming ==
=== Original programming ===
==== Scripted programming ====
===== Animated sitcoms =====
- Dr. Katz, Professional Therapist (1995–99, 2002)
- Kid Notorious (2003)
- Drawn Together (2004–07)
- Freak Show (2006)
- Lil' Bush (2007–08)
- Futurama (2008–25) (Note: Seasons 1–4 originally aired on Fox, seasons 5-7 originally aired on Comedy Central as an original series, before being revived by Hulu in 2023)
- Ugly Americans (2010–12)
- Brickleberry (2012–15)
- Moonbeam City (2015)
- Legends of Chamberlain Heights (2016–17)
- Jeff & Some Aliens (2017)
- Fairview (2022)
- Tooning Out the News (2022–23; moved from Paramount+)
- Digman! (2023–25)
- Everybody Still Hates Chris (2024)

===== Live-action sitcoms =====
- The Clinic (1995)
- Strangers with Candy (1999–2000)
- Frank Leaves for the Orient (1999)
- Strip Mall (2000–01)
- That's My Bush! (2001)
- Contest Searchlight (2002)
- Gerhard Reinke's Wanderlust (2003)
- Reno 911! (2003–13; 2016–17; 2020–22) (Note: Moved to Quibi for season 7 and The Roku Channel for season 8.)
- Wanda Does It (2004)
- Stella (2005)
- Dog Bites Man (2006)
- American Body Shop (2007)
- Halfway Home (2007)
- The Sarah Silverman Program (2007–10)
- Kröd Mändoon and the Flaming Sword of Fire (2009)
- Michael & Michael Have Issues (2009)
- Secret Girlfriend (2009)
- Big Lake (2010)
- Jon Benjamin Has a Van (2011)
- Workaholics (2011–2017)
- Broad City (2014–19)
- Review (2014–17)
- Another Period (2015–18)
- Big Time in Hollywood, FL (2015)
- Idiotsitter (2016–17)
- Time Traveling Bong (2016)
- Detroiters (2017–18)
- Corporate (2018–20)
- The Other Two (2019) (Note: Moved to HBO Max for season 2)
- South Side (2019)
- Awkwafina Is Nora from Queens (2020–23)

==== Stand-up programming ====
- Stand-Up Stand-Up (1991–95)
- Comics Only (1991–95) (hosted by Paul Provenza)
- London Underground (1991–96)
- Two Drink Minimum (1991–96)
- The Big Room (1991–92)
- Women Aloud (1992–94)
- Comic Justice (1993–94)
- Tompkins Square (1996)
- Pulp Comics (1996–2000)
- Premium Blend (1997–2006)
- Lounge Lizards (1997)
- Comedy Central Presents (1998–2011)
- Comic Groove (2002)
- Comic Remix (2002)
- The World Stands Up (2004)
- Shorties Watchin' Shorties (2004)
- The Comedians of Comedy (2005)
- Friday Night Stand-Up with Greg Giraldo (2005–06)
- Live at Gotham (2006–09)
- John Oliver's New York Stand-Up Show (2010–13)
- The Benson Interruption (2010)
- Russell Simmons Presents: Stand-Up at the El Rey (2010)
- Gabriel Iglesias Presents Stand Up Revolution (2011–14)
- Russell Simmons Presents: The Ruckus (2011)
- Mash Up (2012)
- Comedy Central Stand-Up Presents (2012–19)
- Adam Devine's House Party (2013–16)
- Comedy Underground with Dave Attell (2014)
- The Meltdown with Jonah and Kumail (2014–16)
- This Is Not Happening (2015–19)
- Kevin Hart Presents: Hart of the City (2016–19)
- The Comedy Jam (2017)
- Hood Adjacent with James Davis (2017)
- Kevin Hart Presents: The Next Level (2017–18)
- This Week at the Comedy Cellar (2018–20)
- The New Negroes with Baron Vaughn and Open Mike Eagle (2019)
- Bill Burr Presents: The Ringers (2020)

==== Sketch shows ====
- Limboland (1994)
- The Vacant Lot (1994)
- Exit 57 (1995–96)
- Viva Variety (1997–98)
- Upright Citizens Brigade (1998–2000)
- TV Funhouse (2000–01)
- Chappelle's Show (2003–06)
- The Hollow Men (2005)
- Mind of Mencia (2005–08)
- Important Things with Demetri Martin (2009–10)
- The Jeff Dunham Show (2009)
- Nick Swardson's Pretend Time (2010–11)
- Key & Peele (2012–15)
- The Ben Show (2013)
- Inside Amy Schumer (2013–16) (Note: Moved to Paramount+ for season 5)
- Kroll Show (2013–15)
- Alternatino with Arturo Castro (2019) (Note: Moved to Quibi for season 2)

==== Competitive/game shows ====
- Clash! (1991)
- Make Me Laugh (1997–98)
- Win Ben Stein's Money (1997–2003)
- Vs. (1999)
- BattleBots (2000–02)
- Don't Forget Your Toothbrush (U.S. version) (2000)
- Beat the Geeks (2001–02)
- Let's Bowl (2001–02)
- Distraction (U.S. version) (2005–06)
- The Gong Show with Dave Attell (2008)

==== Late night/talk shows ====
- The Sweet Life (1989–90)
- Afterdrive (1991)
- Night After Night with Allan Havey (1991–92)
- Sports Monster (1991)
- Alan King: Inside the Comedy Mind (1991–95)
- Offsides with Dom Irrera (1994–97)
- Politically Incorrect (1994–97)
- Turn Ben Stein On (1999–2001)
- Uncomfortably Close with Michael McKean (1999–2001)
- Primetime Glick (2001–03)
- Tough Crowd with Colin Quinn (2003–04)
- The Graham Norton Effect (U.S. version) (2004)
- Crossballs (2004)
- The Colbert Report (2005–14)
- The Showbiz Show with David Spade (2005–07)
- Too Late with Adam Carolla (2005)
- Weekends at the D.L. (2005)
- Chocolate News (2008)
- Tosh.0 (2009–20)
- Sports Show with Norm Macdonald (2011)
- Onion SportsDome (2011)
- The Burn with Jeff Ross (2012–13)
- @midnight with Chris Hardwick (2013–17)
- The Jeselnik Offensive (2013)
- The Nightly Show with Larry Wilmore (2015–16)
- Why? with Hannibal Buress (2015)
- Not Safe with Nikki Glaser (2016)
- The Gorburger Show (2017)
- The Opposition with Jordan Klepper (2017–2018)
- The President Show (2017)
- Problematic with Moshe Kasher (2017)
- The Jim Jefferies Show (2017–19)
- Taskmaster (2018)
- Good Talk with Anthony Jeselnik (2019)
- Getting Closure with Sydnee Washington (2019–20)
- Klepper (2019)
- Lights Out with David Spade (2019–20)
- Hell of a Week with Charlamagne tha God (2021–22) (Note: Formerly titled Tha God's Honest Truth)
- Doing the Most with Phoebe Robinson (2021)

==== Reality/documentary ====
- Travel Sick (2001–02)
- Insomniac with Dave Attell (2001–04)
- Reel Comedy (2001–10)
- The Sweet Spot (2002)
- I'm with Busey (2003)
- Straight Plan for the Gay Man (2004)
- Con (2005)
- Reality Bites Back (2008)
- Brody Stevens: Enjoy It! (2013–14)
- Nathan for You (2013–17)

==== Variety ====
- Mystery Science Theater 3000 (1991–96)
- Random Acts of Variety (1991–94)
- The Man Show (1999–2004)
- The Chris Wylde Show Starring Chris Wylde (2001)
- Crank Yankers (2002–2005, 2019–2022)
- Trigger Happy TV (U.S. version) (2003)
- The Naked Trucker and T-Bones Show (2007)
- Lewis Black's Root of All Evil (2008)
- Drunk History (2013–19)
- TripTank (2014–16)
- The High Court with Doug Benson (2017)

==== Clip shows ====
- The Higgins Boys and Gruber (1991)
- Access America (1991–92)
- Short Attention Span Theater (1991–94)
- Jump Cuts (2004)
- Atom TV (2008–2010)

=== Syndicated programming ===
- 30 Rock (2011–15)
- 1000 Ways to Die (2016–17)
- The Abbott and Costello Show (1991; 1993–95)
- Action (2003–04)
- All Is Forgiven (June 1991)
- Absolutely Fabulous (1994–2003)
- Almost Live! (1992–94)
- Archer (2015–19)
- The Associates (1991)
- The Bad News Bears (1991)
- Baywatch (2010)
- The Ben Stiller Show (1995–96)
- The Benny Hill Show (1993–96)
- The Best of Groucho (1991–92)
- Best of the West (1991)
- Blackadder (1991–93)
- Bob & Carol & Ted & Alice (April/October 1991)
- BoJack Horseman (2018–19; 2020)
- Brooklyn Nine-Nine (2022–23)
- Bridget Loves Bernie (December 1991)
- Camp Runamuck (1991–92)
- Candid Camera (1991–93)
- Captain Nice (1991)
- Car 54, Where Are You? (1991–92)
- The Charmings (1991)
- The Cleveland Show (2018–26)
- Community (2013–15)
- C.P.O. Sharkey (1991–92)
- Creature Comforts (2004–05)
- The Critic (1995–2006)
- Dilbert (2003–05)
- Drive–In Reviews (1993)
- Dream On (1996–99)
- Duckman (2000–05)
- The Duck Factory (1991–96)
- Entourage (2011–14)
- Fawlty Towers (1997-98)
- Fractured Flickers (1991)
- Fresno (June 1991)
- Friends (2019; 2021–22)
- Futurama (2013–21; 2022–25)
- Gary & Mike (2002–04)
- Glenn Martin, DDS (2009–10)
- The Goode Family (2010–11)
- The Harper House (2021)
- How I Met Your Mother (2016–17)
- It's Always Sunny in Philadelphia (2010–17)
- It's Garry Shandling's Show (1995–97)
- The Jack Benny Program (1991–93)
- Just Shoot Me! (2009)
- Kenny vs. Spenny (2007)
- The Kids in the Hall (1991–2005)
- King of the Hill (2018–19)
- Lancelot Link, Secret Chimp (1991–92)
- The Late Late Show with James Corden (2020)
- Late Night with Conan O'Brien (2002–04)
- Laurel and Hardy (1991–92)
- The League of Gentlemen (2000)
- Love, American Style (1991–93)
- The Lucy Show (1991)
- MADtv (2004–10)
- Married... with Children (2010)
- McHale's Navy (1991–93)
- Monty Python's Flying Circus (1991–96)
- Mr. Show with Bob and David (2005–07)
- The New Candid Camera (1992)
- Occasional Wife (1992)
- The Odd Couple (1998–99)
- One Night Stand (1991–2000)
- The Phil Silvers Show (1991–92)
- Phyllis (1991–93; 1995)
- Police Squad! (1993–2000)
- Quark (1991–92)
- Rhoda (1991–93; 1995)
- Saturday Night Live (1991–2003; 2015–16)
- Schitt's Creek (2020–22)
- Scrubs (2006–13, 2017–19)
- SCTV (1991–94)
- Sit Down, Shut Up (2010–12)
- Soap (1994–2001)
- Sports Night (2000–02)
- Star Trek: Lower Decks (2021)
- The State (July 2009)
- The Steve Allen Show (1991–93)
- Tabitha (1991)
- The Texas Wheelers (1991)
- That '70s Show (2017–20)
- That Girl (1991–92)
- The Tick (1996–99)
- The Tony Randall Show (1991; 1993)
- The Tracey Ullman Show (1995–98)
- TV's Bloopers & Practical Jokes (1991–92)
- TV Nation (1996–97)
- Undergrads (2002–04)
- When Things Were Rotten (1991)
- Whose Line Is It Anyway? (1991–98; 2000–05)
- Wonder Showzen (2005)
- Working Stiffs (1991)
- The Young Ones (1995–96)
- Your Show of Shows (1991–92)

== Events and specials ==
- Out There (1993–94)
- Canned Ham (1996–2002)
- Heroes of Black Comedy (2002)
- Heroes of Jewish Comedy (2002)
- Comedy Central Roast (2003–19)
- Last Laugh (2004–07) (specials)
- This Show Will Get You High (2010)
- The Comedy Awards (2011–12)
- Best of The Comedy Central Roast (2019)
- Hall of Flame: Top 100 Comedy Central Roast Moments (2021)
- South Park The 25th Anniversary Concert (2022)

== Films ==
=== Comedy Central original movies ===
- Porn 'n Chicken (2002)
- Windy City Heat (2003)
- Knee High P.I. (2003)
- A Clüsterfünke Christmas (2021)
- Hot Mess Holiday (2021)
- Out of Office (2022)
- Cursed Friends (2022)
- Reno 911! It's a Wonderful Heist (2022)
- Office Race (2023)

=== Comedy Central films ===
These are films that were theatrically released and based on Comedy Central properties.

- South Park: Bigger, Longer & Uncut (1999) (with Paramount Pictures, Warner Bros. Pictures, Scott Rudin Productions and Braniff Productions)
- The Hebrew Hammer (2003) (with ContentFilm and Strand Releasing)
- Strangers with Candy (2006) (with THINKFilm)
- Reno 911!: Miami (2007) (with 20th Century Fox, Paramount Pictures, and Jersey Films)
- New Kids Turbo (2010) (United States)
- The Drawn Together Movie: The Movie! (2010)
- New Kids Nitro (2011) (United States)
