= Perry Caravello =

American actor (born 1963)

- Born: November 17, 1963 (age 63); Park Ridge, Illinois, U.S.
- Other name: Scary Perry
- Occupations: Streamer; actor; comedian; podcaster
- Years active: 1988–present

YouTube information
- Channel: PerryCaravelloLive
- Subscribers: 25.1 thousand
- Views: 13.89 million
- Last updated: April 30, 2026
- Website: www.perrycaravellolive.com

Perry Frank "Francis" Caravello (born November 17, 1963) is an American actor, comedian, alleged snowboarder, and internet personality who is best known as the star of the 2003 movie Windy City Heat and the internet live stream Perry Caravello Live.

== Early life ==
Originally from the northwest suburbs of Chicago, Caravello was born in Park Ridge and lived there before moving to Des Plaines, Barrington, Palatine, and Arlington Heights. He moved with his family to Southern California in 1974. In 1979, three weeks after getting his driver's license, he was injured in a car accident that put him in a coma for three weeks. As a result of the accident, Caravello suffered brain trauma.

== Career ==
=== The Big Three ===
Caravello started acting and standup comedy around 1988, performing in an aggressive style inspired by his idol Sam Kinison, which earned him the nickname "Scary Perry". Early in his career he was trying to get standup spots at The Comedy Store, when an open mic host named Don Barris challenged him to shave his own chest onstage with a razor and no soap. Caravello did the stunt and was given a regular spot at the comedy club. This was the beginning of frequent comedic collaborations between Caravello and Barris, along with Tony Barbieri (aka "Mole"), all of which were typically at the expense of Perry, and the trio became known as "The Big Three".

In 2003, Caravello starred in the Comedy Central reality movie Windy City Heat, directed by Bobcat Goldthwait, produced by comedians Jimmy Kimmel and Adam Carolla under their company Jackhole Productions (with TV/film producer Daniel Kellison), and written by Barris and Barbieri. All three co-starred as well. The movie was one elaborate prank on Caravello who was under the impression he had landed his first starring role in a major motion picture.

In 2010, Caravello, Barris and Barbieri started a weekly comedy podcast called The Big 3 Podcast, on Adam Carolla's ACE Broadcasting Network. In 2011 the show moved to Barris' own network, before ending in April 2015. Caravello has spoken on Simply Don The Podcast from 2014 through 2020.

=== Perry Caravello Live ===
In November 2020, Caravello launched his own live trash stream on the platform Twitch (and later expanded to YouTube) with the help of his publicist Tom Brennan. The following Caravello obtained from Windy City Heat proved to make his streaming channels successful and began streaming 3 to 4 days a week.

The stream's main form of comedic content typically consists of the stream's audience sending troll messages in the form of text to speech & media share donations, along with delivery items of food that Perry does not like as a means to infuriate him, Perry raging at, and sometimes occasionally physically assaulting, Tom and/or whoever are guests on certain streams, and Perry being paid certain amounts of money to do numerous embarrassing stunts, tasks, and dares.

=== Other work ===
Caravello claims on June 26th, 1992, he was coerced into giving a handjob to casting director Randy Callahan, where in turn, he received fellatio in order to receive three SAG vouchers and a featured extra role in Across the Moon, a romantic comedy starring Christina Applegate & Elizabeth Peña.. On the June 19th, 2026 edition of PCL, Callahan appeared on call with Perry & Tom to clarify his side of the story. Callahan denied meeting Caravello until 1994, along with most other elements of his story, saying the only truthful thing Caravello has said about him is that he is gay.

After Windy City Heat, Caravello started working with Richard Heene on a project called Psyience Detectives in which they played storm chasing detectives. The project ended during production in 2006 when the two men got involved in a physical altercation while filming. After the Balloon boy hoax perpetrated by Richard Heene, Caravello made frequent TV appearances in which he was interviewed in regard to Heene's character. He was then invited on Jimmy Kimmel Live!, where he was lampooned for taking advantage of his "15 minutes of fame" in light of the incident.

He has also had roles in the Adult Swim shows Hot Package and Smiling Friends, as well as Derek and Simon: The Show, and Virtuosity and was also an extra in Austin Powers in Goldmember where he can be seen multiple times during the prison rap scene.

Perry was prank-called by The Jerky Boys on the track "Perry's Slacks" on the 2020 album The Jerky Boys.

== Mousetrap lawsuit ==
On June 1, 2007, Caravello filed a lawsuit alleging that Jimmy Kimmel, Adam Carolla, and Johnny Knoxville had promised him ten million dollars if he agreed to place his genitals in a mousetrap during an episode of The Adam Carolla Show. The lawsuit was initiated after Caravello suffered an injury during the stunt, did not receive the promised payment, and was not provided with an account of profits and royalties from DVD sales of Windy City Heat.

== Filmography ==
Year(s)	Title	Role	Episodes	Ref.
1994	Across the Moon	Extra		
1995	Virtuosity	Popcorn Vendor		
2002	Austin Powers in Goldmember	Extra		
2003	Windy City Heat	Himself/Stone Fury		
2007	Derek and Simon: The Show	Sherlock Helms	1	
2013	Hot Package	Himself	2	
2022	Smiling Friends	Simon S. Salty	1	
Upcoming	The Wild Western	"Screaming" Silas Kane		
