= Tony Barbieri =

American comedy writer and performer (born 1963)

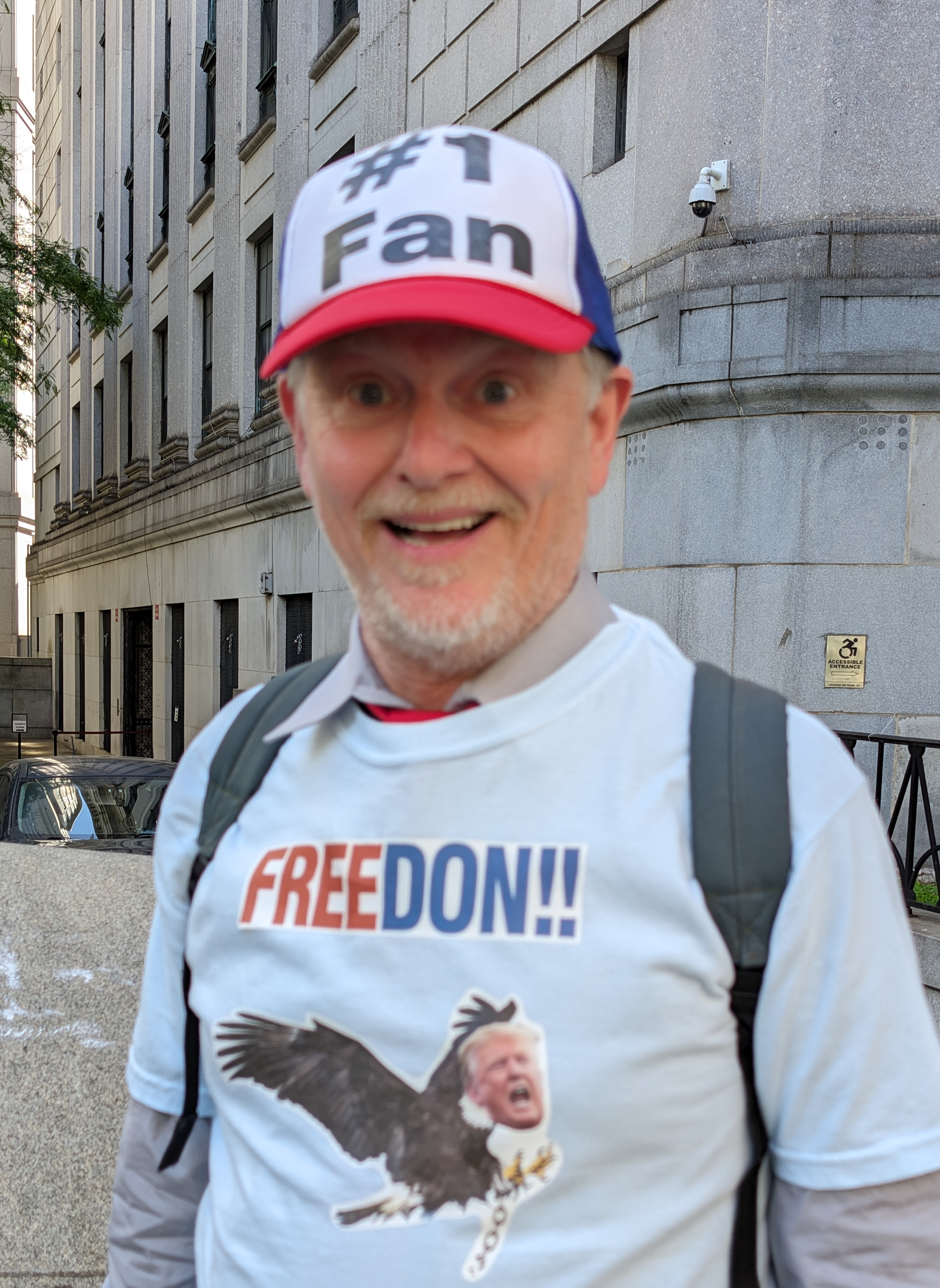
- "Jake Byrd" wearing his signature "#1 Fan" baseball cap (in red, white, and blue) in Manhattan at Donald Trump's criminal trial.
- Born: Anthony J. Barbieri; August 26, 1963 (age 62); Framingham, Massachusetts, U.S.
- Occupations: Comedian; writer
- Years active: 1988–present
- Known for: Appearances as "Jake Byrd" on Jimmy Kimmel Live!; Appearance as "Walter "Mole" Molinsky" in Windy City Heat

Anthony J. Barbieri (born August 26, 1963) is an American comedic writer and performer. He is known for his appearances as the Jimmy Kimmel Live! character "Jake Byrd", and as "Walter 'Mole' Molinsky" in the Comedy Central TV movie, Windy City Heat.

== Career ==
Barbieri was the writer of the monthly satirical Monroe comic strip for Mad Magazine from 1997 to 2010.

In 1999, he got his first writing credit for television while working on The Man Show. Barbieri went on to write for the sitcoms That's My Bush! and That '80s Show.

=== The Big Three ===
Barbieri was part of a comedy team known as "The Big Three" with Perry Caravello and Don Barris In 2003, the trio starred in the Comedy Central reality movie Windy City Heat, directed by Bobcat Goldthwait and written by Barris and Barbieri, and Jimmy Kimmel. The movie was an elaborate prank on Caravello who was under the impression he had landed his first starring role in a major motion picture.

In 2010, Caravello, Barris and Barbieri started a weekly comedy podcast called The Big 3 Podcast, on Adam Carolla's ACE Broadcasting Network. In 2011 the show moved to Barris' own network, before ending in April 2015.

=== Jimmy Kimmel Live! ===
Barbieri began writing for Jimmy Kimmel Live! in 2003, and in 2004 started appearing on the show as the character Jake Byrd. Byrd is portrayed as a good-natured man obsessed with celebrities, and his bits involve him satirizing excessive media attention to celebrity spectacles such as the Michael Jackson trial or the arrest of Paris Hilton. Byrd usually interacts with the fans while they are being interviewed by the media or inserts himself into press conferences. He has successfully fooled major media outlets into thinking he is a real person, including The New York Times, who quoted him in a May 1, 2004, article about the Michael Jackson trial, before running a redact five days later noting that he was a character. Despite this, the Times wrote again about him, as if he were a real person, during the 2007 O. J. Simpson robbery case.

On May 30, 2024, posing as a supporter of former U.S. president and 2024 presidential candidate Donald Trump, Byrd was again quoted, as if a real person, in a Fox News article about the reactions of Trump supporters towards the former president's criminal conviction. Byrd carried a sign with the words "Free Father Theresa" outside the Manhattan Criminal Courthouse while interacting with Trump supporters, in reference to a statement by Donald Trump comparing himself to Mother Teresa. The words on Byrd's sign was used in the title of the Fox News article. Byrd was also filmed screaming by NBC News in their coverage of the event. In his part as a parody Trump supporter, Byrd gained brief Internet notoriety as a meme on the social media platform X (formerly Twitter).

In 2008, Barbieri won the Primetime Emmy Award for Outstanding Original Music and Lyrics for the Jimmy Kimmel Live! song "I'm F**king Matt Damon". He was nominated for another Emmy in 2013 as part of Kimmel's writing staff for Outstanding Writing for a Variety Series.

== Filmography ==
The following list includes shows or films in which he has a small, but credited, role as a writer or actor.

- Rick and Morty (2015) – (TV program) (voice actor)
- Windy City Heat (2003) – (TV movie) (writer/actor) – Appeared as Walter "Mole" Molinsky.
- Jimmy Kimmel Live! (2003–) (talk show on ABC) – (writer/actor) – His own pieces, including his well-known character Jake Byrd.
- That '80s Show (2002) (TV program) (writer)
- Crank Yankers (2002–present) (TV program) (writer/voice actor) - Performed Niles Standish and the Concierge.
- That's My Bush! (2001) (TV program) – (writer/actor) – A political comedy spoofing George W. Bush (appeared in one episode).
- The Man Show (1999–2004) (TV program) (writer)
- Delta Force: Land Warrior (2000) (video game) (voice actor)
- Pledge Night (1988) (movie) – Horror film.
