= Windy City Heat =

American made-for-TV movie (2003)

- DVD Cover
- Written by: Tony Barbieri; Don Barris; Jimmy Kimmel
- Directed by: Bobcat Goldthwait
- Starring: Perry Caravello; Tony Barbieri; Don Barris
- Original language: English

Production
- Producers: Adam Carolla; Daniel Kellison; Jimmy Kimmel
- Running time: 92 minutes
- Production company: Jackhole Productions

Original release
- Network: Comedy Central
- Release: 2003

Windy City Heat is a 2003 made-for-television film directed by Bobcat Goldthwait that aired on Comedy Central.

Starring Don Barris, Tony Barbieri, and Perry Caravello, the film documents an elaborate, years-long prank in which aspiring performer Caravello believes he is starring in a detective movie called Windy City Heat. However, the production is in fact orchestrated to provoke his reactions on camera.

Critics and retrospectives have described the project as a singular entry in prank-based comedy and a cult item that later found an audience on home video and online platforms.

== Background ==
Perry Caravello is a celebrity and struggling comedian, actor, "skateboarder and snowboarder" who was "discovered" in 1992 by comedian Don Barris, the warmup comic for Jimmy Kimmel Live and The Man Show, during an open mic night audition at The Comedy Store in West Hollywood, California. Barris offered Caravello a chance at stardom and, along with Tony Barbieri playing a perpetually stoned "Walter 'Mole' Molinski," befriended Caravello and has played pranks on him since 1995. Caravello's ongoing commitment to achieving this stardom, with the assistance and participation of Barris and Barbieri, is known as The Perry Project, which is noted with a title card at the beginning of the film.

When performing as a trio, Caravello, Barris, and Mole are collectively known as "The Big 3." In a scene in Windy City Heat, Caravello cites an unnamed source referring to the group as "the Three Stooges of the new millennium". In the 1990s, the Big 3 prominently appeared on Simply Don the Public Access Program, a popular public-access television show in the Los Angeles area created and hosted by Barris. Kimmel later joined the show as an announcer.

== Plot ==
Perry Caravello believes he has been given a chance to star in a movie called Windy City Heat, a crime film about a "sports private eye" named Stone Fury. However, there is no such film, as the entire project is an elaborate prank played on him by Don Barris and Mole with the help of producers Jimmy Kimmel and Adam Carolla and real celebrity cameos including Carson Daly, Dane Cook, Tammy Faye Bakker, and William "The Refrigerator" Perry.

Caravello's participation in the "film" begins with the audition process, where he is introduced to Daly, who is also up for the lead role of Stone Fury (and is dressed exactly like Caravello). After a botched audition, interrupted numerous times by Barris and Mole, he eventually wins the role over Daly (later in the movie, he is shown a wall of stars that have also been considered but crossed off, including Harrison Ford, Brad Pitt, and Robert De Niro). The plot of the movie revolves around a dubious story involving Fury trying to track down the actual refrigerator of William "Refrigerator" Perry and the pants of Ernie Banks (Perry appears as himself, while actor Paul Motley portrays Banks). Caravello appears in most scenes with Barris and Mole, who portray Chicago Outfit gangsters "Big Lou" and "Brock," the antagonists of the film. Windy City Heat is directed by Bobcat Goldthwait, who is the actual director in addition to playing the director of the fake film-within-the-film, wearing jodhpurs and only speaking to people through a bullhorn.

Caravello is followed around by at least fifteen cameras (some of which are hidden) during the filming process. He is told from the beginning that he is being recorded and interviewed for the film's DVD extras. Some of the pranks include repeatedly dumping him into a dumpster filled with manure; making him drink a milkshake made of coffee, Chinese food, raw egg, pizza, and beer while filming multiple takes of a scene, giving him a case of severe diarrhea; and bringing in a stunt double to film Caravello's sex scene with his leading lady, which Caravello is told involves actual sexual penetration on set. Along the way, Barris and Mole continue to egg him on, performing a balancing act of pushing his buttons and stroking his ego. The stress increasingly infuriates Caravello and frequently leads him to scream in a high-pitched shriek. Barris regularly tells Caravello to "Unleash the Fury!"

Throughout the filmmaking process, Caravello is introduced to several individuals involved with the production, purported to be real people, whose names are identical to historical and cinematic figures. Such individuals include the eccentric English producer of the movie, "John Quincy Adams" (whom Caravello never meets in person and who only calls when Mole leaves the room), casting director "Roman Polanski" (Cook), studio receptionist and soon to be co-star "Susan B. Anthony" (Lisa Arch, credited as Lisa Kushell), Japanese "money man" "Hiroshima Nagasaki" (Toshi Toda), who backs out of financing the production when Mole knocks over a table of junk food, limo driver and aspiring rock musician "Travis Bickle" (Dave Sheridan), set photographer "Ansel Adams" (Toby Huss), production assistant "Frances Farmer" (Laura Silverman), Caravello's personal assistant "Burt Ward" (Eric Marseglia), and merchandising agents "Sacco and Vanzetti" (Scott Hartman and Wayne Wilderson). Notable exceptions to this naming convention include attorney "Sol Stienbergowitz-Greenbaum" (Sal Iacono) and Santiago (Tom Kenny), a wardrobe assistant who mistakes Caravello for Luke Perry, provoking a homophobic outburst that Caravello attributes to a homosexual encounter with a casting agent in 1992. Caravello never questions these coincidences on film aside from expressing doubts as to the identity of a man purporting to be Charlton Heston (Bob Legionaire), who refuses to leave Caravello's assigned trailer. To placate him, he suavely offers the old man a cameo in the film, which he enthusiastically accepts with humorous results.

The film culminates in an intentionally hindered race to the fake film's "one time only screening," during which the Big 3 are delayed by a number of setbacks, finally making it in time to see only a select few scenes of the film. They finally arrive at the theater and discover that Caravello's name is misspelled on the marquee. A running gag in the movie is that whenever Caravello's name appears in print, it is usually misspelled. The film itself (what is actually shown of it) features laughably unrealistic special effects, lines of dialogue ripped from Casablanca, Chinatown and Gone with the Wind, ludicrously named characters such as "Jiggly Wrigley" and even a dinosaur, which is inserted into the film at the insistence of Yurgi (Tom Stern), a Romanian pornographic film producer who takes over as the film's new financier. Immediately following the screening, Caravello is met with an enthusiastic round of applause from the audience and is presented with an oversized and extravagant trophy from the "President of Show Business" (Geoff Pierson).

The film ends with a montage backed by Louis Prima's version of "When You're Smiling".

== Aftermath ==
Unlike typical prank shows, it is not revealed to Caravello at the end of the film that the entire thing was a prank; this is due to the fact that the movie is only one component of The Perry Project. After production, Caravello was told that the 'real' Windy City Heat had been scrapped due to production issues, but that the behind-the-scenes footage from the film would be repurposed into its own film. This explains why Perry both believes the fake Windy City Heat production was real and yet recognizes that the released film mostly consists of pranks. Included on the DVD for the film is a video recording of Caravello watching the actual film for the first time in his home, alongside Barris and Barbieri (still in character as Mole, who in turn tells Caravello he has adopted the stage name "Tony Barbieri")..

On Caravello's star commentary track for the DVD, recorded two years after the initial release of the film, he acknowledges that he has since realized that many sequences in the film were set up as pranks on him (he says he read about it online), and that he knows Barris and Barbieri were intentionally conniving to infuriate him, but he continues to speak of the "film" and his acting abilities with the same gusto. Notably, Caravello claims he was playing along during his audition, when Dane Cook introduces himself by the name "Roman Polanski," stating that he had "fucked with everybody" because he did a report on Roman Polanski in elementary school. Despite acknowledging that "Polanski" wasn't really a casting director, he continues to believe that it was a real audition and he legitimately beat out the other actors (including Ford, Pitt, De Niro and Daly) to win the Stone Fury role. He also gets emotional watching the scene at the film's premiere when he receives the trophy from the "President of Show Business," and says that he cries every time he watches it.

In a 2013 podcast appearance, physician and broadcaster Drew Pinsky said a Comedy Central executive told him the channel stopped re-airing the film due to legal concerns related to the Americans with Disabilities Act; this account has not been independently corroborated.

When the DVD of the film was released in 2006, the cover is listed as starring "Perry Karavello", continuing the running gag of misspelling Caravello's name.

On June 1, 2007, Caravello filed a lawsuit against Jackass star Johnny Knoxville, alleging that Knoxville, along with Jimmy Kimmel and Adam Carolla, promised him ten million dollars to put his genitals in a mousetrap to show that Perry F. Caravello could prove his "Stone Fury" worthiness live on The Adam Carolla Morning Show on 97.1 FM KLSX as a stunt, and to promote the recently released DVD, and also for payment for his performance in the movie. Caravello dropped this lawsuit on June 10, 2008. In a 2013 appearance on WTF with Marc Maron, Barris revealed that an unnamed attorney representing Caravello received a portion of a relatively small financial settlement, but did not divulge further details.

== Sequel ==
On October 11, 2013, the Big 3 announced plans for a sequel that would be crowd funded. The crowd funding attempt to raise $500k ran for 50 days and raised $16,220, or 3.2% of the target amount. Barris subsequently announced that enough funds were raised to film a reality show television pilot that is being actively marketed around Hollywood. Fans were encouraged to join the production as extras during the "Wedding Weekend," which was filmed for the pilot.

== The Big 3 Podcast ==
In October 2010, Windy City Heat was spun off into a weekly comedy podcast called The Big 3 Podcast. It features the Big 3 in what they describe as a discussion on "pop culture and our own personal lives". Many of the themes and running gags from Windy City Heat return, such as the constant misspelling and mispronunciation of Caravello's name and the inadvertent provocation of Caravello's self-admitted homophobia, which often results in repeated references to Caravello's homosexual encounter with a casting agent in 1992. Supporting characters from Windy City Heat, including "John Quincy Adams", "Yurgi", "Sol Steinbergowitz-Greenbaum" and "Burt Ward," have made a return for the podcast, and the show has featured guest appearances by celebrity fans such as Jimmy Kimmel, Andy Dick, Dominic Monaghan, Jeff Richards, former Penthouse Pet of the Month Linda Johnson and prominent Los Angeles businessman Neil "The Mattress King" Leeds. The show was initially published by ACE Broadcasting Network, but since September 2011 it was independently published by Don Barris' "Simply Don the Podcast Network".

=== The Big 3 Live ===
Debuting at the Sundance Film Festival in January 2013, The Big 3 Live was a monthly live video podcast produced and distributed by Video Podcast Network (VPN), part of the YouTube Original Channel Initiative. It uses many of the elements of The Big 3 Podcast, but also includes video clips of past Big 3 moments, such as segments from Simply Don the Public Access Program and appearances at The Comedy Store. VPN also made it part of their "ANiMASHUPS" series, where they take audio clips from VPN shows and animate them into short cartoons.

== Reception and legacy ==
Contemporary and later critics were divided. Some praised the film’s commitment to its conceit and its place within prank-based comedy, while others criticized it as cruel or repetitive. For example, Las Vegas Weekly described the project as “immature, repetitive and unfunny,” while acknowledging its elaborate construction. Retrospectives have identified the film as a cult item that later reached wider audiences through home video and online circulation, and have discussed its influence on subsequent prank formats and internet “prank” culture.

== See also ==
- List of practical joke topics
