= Jackhole Productions =

American production company

- Type: Private
- Industry: Film and Television productions
- Founded: 1999
- Founder: Jimmy Kimmel; Adam Carolla; Daniel Kellison
- Products: The Man Show; Crank Yankers; Jimmy Kimmel Live (2003-2020)

Jackhole Productions was an American production company started by Jimmy Kimmel, Daniel Kellison and Adam Carolla. It produced several comedy shows on television. Jackhole Productions has worked on several projects with production company DiGa.

The company's name is an amalgam of Carolla and Kellison's company Jackhouse, and Kimmel's company Cashhole. It is also a made up swear word. The mascot is an animated donkey wearing a sombrero.

At some point, Kimmel's new production company, Kimmelot, assumed production responsibilities for Jimmy Kimmel Live!.

== Filmography ==
Year	Title	Network	Notes
Television
1999–2004	The Man Show	Comedy Central	Seasons 1–5 only.
2002–2007	Crank Yankers	Comedy Central / MTV2	Seasons 1-4 only. Only the original run.
2003–2020	Jimmy Kimmel Live!	ABC	Seasons 1-17 only. Replaced by Kimmelot for the remainder of the series.
2003	Gerhard Reinke's Wanderlust	Comedy Central	
2005	Too Late with Adam Carolla	Comedy Central	
2005	The Adam Carolla Project	TLC	
2005–2007	The Andy Milonakis Show	MTV / MTV2	
2011	Sports Show with Norm Macdonald	Comedy Central	
Film
2003	Windy City Heat	Comedy Central	Cult made-for-TV prank film. Only film made by the company.
