= Madonna on the Late Show with David Letterman in 1994 =

Controversial live television incident

Madonna's heavily censored appearance on Late Show with David Letterman led to some of Letterman's highest late-night viewership.

American singer Madonna made an appearance on CBS's Late Show with David Letterman on March 31, 1994. The appearance was noted for an extremely controversial series of statements and antics by Madonna, which included many expletives. In particular, Madonna said the word fuck fourteen times throughout the interview. This made the episode the most censored in American network television talk-show history while at the same time garnering host David Letterman some of the highest ratings he ever received. Critics commented she reached her "lowest low".

Madonna's language and behavior—which was provocative, seemingly spontaneous at times, and full of double entendres, and ended with a playful refusal to leave the set—sparked a large public controversy. The Federal Communications Commission received numerous complaints about the language used on the show, echoing Letterman's (sarcastic) remark that she had to stop using the bad language "because people don't want that in their own homes at 11:30 at night".

== Details ==
Madonna's appearance of March 31, 1994, was not her first or last with Letterman; in 1988, she was a guest on Letterman's previous show, NBC's Late Night with David Letterman, with comedian Sandra Bernhard. This was, however, her first appearance since Letterman moved from NBC to CBS in 1993. Madonna's 1994 appearance additionally marked her first on U.S. television that year following controversy with her book Sex, her album Erotica, and her movies Body of Evidence and Dangerous Game, both of which had been poorly received by critics upon releases in 1992 and 1993 respectively.

Daniel Kellison, who had been Letterman's talent coordinator at the time, wrote for Grantland that he had booked Madonna for the show with the pre-arranged premise that she would scold the host for his mocking of her personal life. However, when she arrived at the Ed Sullivan Theater, she was surly toward Kellison. After his attempts to go over the segment with Madonna, she admitted that before coming she had smoked marijuana, which she referred to as "endo". Kellison wrote the intro Letterman used to welcome Madonna to the stage:

Our first guest tonight is one of the biggest stars in the world, and in the past ten years she has sold over 80 million albums, starred in countless films and slept with some of the biggest names in the entertainment industry.

Letterman's band leader, Paul Shaffer, responded, "She's your guest! ... Come on, she's your guest!" to which Letterman responded, "Everything's fine, just relax, will ya?" Madonna then entered the set to the sound of her 1983 hit song "Holiday", clutching a pair of her underwear, which she asked Letterman to smell during the interview. "Wait a minute, aren't you gonna smell them?" she said, to which Letterman replied, "I'll take care of that later", and Madonna complained to the audience: "I gave him my underpants and he won't smell them!"

Letterman, following up from events earlier in the program, asked Madonna to kiss a man in the audience; she refused. Letterman expressed admiration for her not succumbing to the pressure. Madonna began smoking a cigar, and as he moved to another topic, she interrupted him, in an opening salvo soon to be indicative of the random provocations to come: "Incidentally, you are a sick fuck. I don't know why I get so much shit."

Letterman steered his questioning toward Madonna's private life and, in particular, her reported relationships with several NBA players. She replied with a series of sexual innuendos, commenting "that [overhead] microphone is really long"; Letterman responded by talking about her friendship with Charles Barkley. When he abruptly changed topic and asked about her nose ring in an ambiguous way ("Did it hurt when you had that thing put in, uh, put in your nose?"), Madonna laughed and said, "I thought you were going to ask me if it hurt something else", which spurred a collective series of nervous laughter from the studio audience.

Prior to the first commercial break (which Madonna objected to, citing that she wanted to "break the rules" and not conform to the constraints of American network television), the singer asked Letterman if he was wearing a "rug"; never missing the opportunity for a joke, the host, referring to Madonna's short slicked-down hairstyle, replied by asking Madonna if she was wearing a swim cap.

After the commercial break, Madonna told Letterman that he had changed since her last visit, that he was no longer "cool" or challenging to his guests, that, "Money's made you soft." Letterman asked her what was really bothering her; the singer told the audience that she was angry that the comedian always (in Letterman's words – "periodically") made references to her sex life on the show, as had initially been planned.

When Madonna continued to swear, the director cut to an elderly couple from Appleton, Wisconsin, in the audience, visibly shocked by Madonna's language; this was followed by a video montage featuring Madonna-related comedy monologues. After a second commercial break, Madonna asked Letterman whether he had ever urinated in the shower, claiming it was an antiseptic to fight athlete's foot.

Letterman asked Madonna if she had a boyfriend ("Are you currently interested in someone?"). She responded that she did, and when asked what his name was, she replied, "Dave". Letterman then attempted to deflect the obvious implication by asking her if she was talking about David Dinkins, the former mayor of New York City.

Towards the end of the interview, Madonna also asked whether he had ever smoked "endo", a slang reference to marijuana. Looking uncomfortable, the host told the singer that he had no idea what she was talking about; she called him a liar, which led Letterman to make light of the embarrassing question by acting like Johnny Carson.

=== Refusal to leave the set ===
When Madonna refused to leave the set, there was jeering from members of the audience, including heckling to "get off". The home audience never saw Madonna leave her chair; instead, the show cut to a third commercial break, after which she was gone. Kellison said producer Robert Morton ordered him to "(g)et rid of her", and Kellison went to take her off the stage. Letterman said, "Coming up in the next half hour, Mother Teresa is going to drop by." He then looked at an index card and joked, "Oh, I see we've been canceled, there is no show tomorrow night."

Another guest, who was the United States Grocery Bagging Champion at the time, was scheduled to appear on the show that evening, but his segment was cancelled due to Madonna refusing to leave the stage when her interview was over. Counting Crows concluded the show with a performance of "Round Here".

== Aftermath ==
Madonna later explained her behavior as a failed attempt to make a stand against television censorship, and made up with Letterman by having him escort her onstage at the 1994 MTV Video Music Awards. In an interview with Bob Guccione Jr. in Spin magazine in the fall of 1995, Madonna further defended herself:

You can show a person getting blown up, and you can't say fuck? It's such hypocrisy. The fact that everyone counted how many fucks I said—how small minded is that? ... The other thing that was ridiculous was that David Letterman knew I was going to do it. I talked to the producers of the show. Everybody was like, this will be really funny if you say fuck a lot they'll just keep bleeping you. Well, I came out and started doing it, and David freaked out. The way he introduced me was derogatory, so my whole thing was, okay, if that's how you want to play it, you cannot beat me at this game.

In a subsequent interview with USA Today, Letterman noted how Madonna sent him a fax on his birthday, shortly after the episode aired. "It was more of the same", he revealed. "'Happy fucking birthday. Have a nice fucking day.' I know she was trying to be funny about it." The fax sent on April 12, 1994, reads:

Happy Fucking Birthday Dave!

glad you could get so much mileage out of the fucking show. Next time you need some fucking publicity, just give me a fucking call.

love

the anti-christ

M. xx

The incident was widely referenced in popular culture. For example, in an episode of The Critic titled "Sherman, Woman and Child", Madonna is featured as a profane guest of Humphrey the Hippo, a parody of Barney & Friends. In the Space Ghost Coast to Coast episode "Bobcat", comedian Bobcat Goldthwait sarcastically comments to the character Moltar that Space Ghost's interview with The Ramones "is going as well as the Letterman–Madonna interview." The panties skit was later satirized in 2001 on the Italian late night show Satyricon, where guest Anna Falchi actually took off her red panties on stage and the host went all the way to smell them, causing a scandal in Italy.

Letterman referred to the incident frequently in the short term afterward, usually as a disaster, even though it was a ratings bonanza. In one example, while raising the topic of Madonna's appearance, he added the subordinate clause: "... or as I call it, Black Thursday ..." According to Daniel Kellison, Letterman was privately displeased by what had happened. "He always understood the privilege that came with the ability to broadcast, and the responsibility that accompanied it. Ratings and press were less a consideration," wrote Kellison.

In 2015, Madonna told Howard Stern, "One time, I was mad at [Letterman] when I said the f-word a lot. I was in a weird mood that day. I was dating Tupac Shakur at the time, and he had got me all riled up about life in general. So, when I went on the show I was feeling very gangsta."

=== Subsequent appearances ===
Following the incident, Madonna made several subsequent appearances on the Late Show. She briefly appeared in a 1995 episode when she brought Letterman candy and flowers for Valentine's Day. She then proclaimed that, "I'm a changed woman since I met you", to which Letterman excitedly exclaimed, "Yes!" Madonna then went on to add, "And I'm not going to say 'fuck' anymore." In 1998, Madonna appeared briefly to announce number three on Letterman's top ten list that night – "Ten Things Beautiful Women Love About Dave."

On November 3, 2000, Madonna returned for her first sit-down interview with Letterman since the 1994 incident to promote her new album Music. The two of them discussed the previous interview, with a deal of humor and objectivity. Madonna chalked it up as a part of her "rebellious period", while Letterman admitted that he now understood how Madonna felt about the media attention towards her private life during that time and that he contributed to that. Madonna then concluded that they were both having a "weak moment", which was met by laughter from both the audience and Letterman. Before the singer took stage to perform her latest single "Don't Tell Me", Letterman jokingly admitted that, "I still have the panties. We had to put them in the vault upstairs, because people were trying to swipe them from me." An uncomfortable Madonna declared, "I'm not rising to that bait."

On November 11, 2003, Madonna guested again to promote her children's book Mr. Peabody's Apples. Before she entered, Letterman stated he "just didn't want any awkward moments."

On October 20, 2005, Madonna appeared to promote her album Confessions on a Dance Floor. He then showed a picture of her for Vogue. They explained oral sex, and Madonna mentioned that she got thrown by a horse which broke her ribs, head and hand. She was forced by Letterman to get back on a horse.

On January 11, 2007, Madonna appeared to promote her film Arthur and the Invisibles. The two joked about the 1994 episode. When David asked Madonna, "What do you think about all these celebrities, such as Britney Spears, not wearing their underwear?", Madonna replied, "It's freezing outside. Maybe you can give them to Britney."

On September 30, 2009, Madonna appeared for the last time to promote the greatest hits compilation Celebration. During this episode, Letterman and Madonna again made light of her 1994 appearance. The episode concluded with Letterman and Madonna going down the street and sharing a vegetarian pizza (minus cheese at Madonna's request) and martinis together.

== See also ==
- Warren Zevon on the Late Show with David Letterman in 2002
