= Winning: The Racing Life of Paul Newman =

- Directed by: Adam Carolla; Nate Adams
- Written by: Adam Carolla; Nate Adams
- Produced by: Adam Carolla; Nate Adams; Matt D'Andria
- Starring: Paul Newman
- Cinematography: Mårten Tedin
- Edited by: Simon Sandquist
- Music by: Extreme Music
- Production companies: Geared Films; Mollette; Sontalia
- Distributed by: Orion Pictures; FilmBuff
- Release date: May 8, 2015
- Running time: 83 minutes
- Country: United States
- Language: English

Winning: The Racing Life of Paul Newman is a 2015 documentary directed by Adam Carolla and Nate Adams. It is based on the book by the same name written by Mat Stone and Preston Lerner The film chronicles the 35-year car racing career of Paul Newman and his racing life as both a driver and owner.

== Release ==
The film premiered on April 16, 2015, in Los Angeles. It was released in theaters and video-on-demand on May 8, 2015.
