= Save Virgil =

- Directed by: Brad Ableson
- Written by: Brad Ableson
- Produced by: Gary Bryman; Steve Hein
- Starring: Adam Carolla; Ginger Lynn; Charmaine Cruz; Gary Coleman
- Edited by: Darrin Roberts
- Music by: Christopher Lennertz
- Release date: March 3, 2004
- Running time: 14 minutes
- Country: United States
- Language: English

Save Virgil is a short independent film by Brad Ableson that mixes live action with animation, released on March 3, 2004. It features the voice of Adam Carolla as the title character who is a human cartoon living in real world. It made its television premiere on G4's Happy Tree Friends and Friends series.

== Plot ==
The story is told primarily through flashbacks as Virgil, a suicidal animated character born to human parents, details his life story to a sympathetic reporter.

Virgil describes how he was born to a biker girl whose partner left shortly after he was born due to his "condition", forcing her to raise him on her own. He didn't get along with other kids his own age and his only solace was watching Viking Girl, a cartoon featuring a beautiful, voluptuous blond Viking warrior. Convinced that she was real, he sets out to Hollywood so he can confess his feelings to her. Despite some misadventures during the trip, Virgil finally arrives at the Viking Girl studio, only to learn that she was never real. Heartbroken, Virgil straps dynamite to himself and goes to the Hollywood sign to take his own life, which is why the reporter was sent to interview him.

The reporter begs Virgil not to end his own life and tells him that he could become the first living cartoon star, as his plight has gained him a legion of fans. This appeals to Virgil and he decides to live. Before he can do anything else he is shot by Gary Coleman, who tells him that the price of fame is not worth it. Virgil dies and goes to an animated heaven where Viking Girl is waiting for him. The two begin having sex but before they can finish everything turns dark and Virgil discovers he has been sent to Hell and that he has been humping Satan's leg, who himself is in the form of Gary Coleman in a red devil costume.

== Cast ==
- Adam Carolla as Virgil
- Ginger Lynn as Virgil's mother
- Gary Coleman as Himself, Satan

== Production ==
Production for Save Virgil was completed around March 2002 through Quality Filmed Entertainment.

== Release ==
Save Virgil screened at Spike and Mike's Sick and Twisted Festival of Animation in 2006.

== Reception ==
The Portland Mercury reviewed the short's appearance at the Spike and Mike festival, writing that it was "tame enough to not be out of place on Comedy Central, or, with a little editing, on a major network. The problem is that, with the high-quality production, the voice of Adam Carolla, and a Gary Coleman cameo, Save Virgil feels almost too polished for Spike and Mike." Animation World Network's Taylor Jessen covered the film at another festival, stating that "overflowing as it is with tit jokes, ass jokes, poo jokes, dick jokes, pot jokes, and Gary Coleman jokes, it aims so low and tries so hard that it misses the dartboard and knocks down the wall. "
