= Too Late with Adam Carolla =

- Created by: Adam Carolla; Daniel Kellison
- Presented by: Adam Carolla
- Country of origin: United States
- No. of seasons: 1
- No. of episodes: 50

Production
- Running time: 30 minutes

Original release
- Network: Comedy Central
- Release: August 8 – November 17, 2005

Too Late with Adam Carolla is a late night talk show hosted by Adam Carolla and produced by Jackhole Industries, a team made up of old collaborators: Carolla, Jimmy Kimmel, and Daniel Kellison. The show, which mixed celebrity interviews, chatty everyday observations, scripted sketches, and phone conversations with viewers (often canned), premiered on August 8, 2005 in the 11:30 p.m. time slot on Comedy Central. The show struggled to find an audience, averaging fewer than 700,000 viewers, a poor performance that Carolla jokingly acknowledged on air. On September 20, the show was moved to midnight and the live audience was dropped. The show got its highest ratings when Steve-O of Jackass and Wildboyz fame came onto the show intoxicated and tackled Adam while yelling obscenities. The last episode aired in November 2005.

== Recurring segments ==
=== Who's on the Blower? ===
When Carolla takes calls from the home audience, this title card is shown on the monitor and the announcer stops the show to ask "Who's on the Blower?" sometimes to Carolla's impatience. When Carlos Mencia was the guest, the segment was retitled "¿Quién está en el Teléfono?"

=== Adam Explains to 1780s Guy ===
Carolla walks in the woods with a guy who looks somewhat like Benjamin Franklin, and plays straight man as the "1780s guy" questions current phenomena such as metrosexuals ("We call them homosexuals") and Oprah Winfrey ("Nubian sorceress").

=== Germany or Florida? ===
Carolla explains his theory that all extremely strange news stories happen either in Germany or Florida, and challenges himself and his guest to guess in which of these places a given news story occurred. Andy Milonakis played a special version of this game, Super Germany or Florida? This bit originated as an idea for Jimmy Kimmel Live!, and when the writers vetoed it, Carolla took it to Loveline. Callers would often call in with a bizarre news story and Carolla and Dr. Drew would attempt to guess whether it was from Germany or Florida. The game also appeared during Carolla's guest host stint on The Late Late Show and subsequently to Too Late.

=== The Lightning Round ===
In some early episodes, Carolla got so carried away with his rants that he forgot to take any phone calls from home viewers, and so the show's producers invented this segment in which Carolla attempts to answer 10 calls in three minutes.

Carolla originally developed The Lightning Round on Loveline when, after the last commercial break in the show, he would take as many phone calls as possible as his alter ego Ace Rockolla, giving quick answers to each caller, regardless of their question. It used the frequent sound effects of a thunder clap and a cow bell, along with Carolla's insistence of repeating the time ("It's 11:56 and 38 seconds, three minutes and 22 seconds before the top of the hour!") and temperature ("86 in LA, 84 in Culver City, 88 in Monterey Park, 83 in Whittier and 79 in Gardena!").

=== Can Ray Break This? ===
In another game that is "sweeping the nation", Adam and guests attempt to predict whether or not Ray Oldhafer, Adam's childhood friend who appeared on The Adam Carolla Project, can break certain objects.

=== The Listeners Speak ===
A buffer segment in between commercial breaks that is a tape of a message left by listeners who are "drunk, high, pissed off, crazy and/or have a great accent" This segment seemed to have been picked up by The Adam Carolla Show on the radio.
