= Crank Yankers =

American adult-oriented puppet television show

- From left to right, Niles Standish, Special Ed, Spoonie Luv, and Dick Birchum
- Created by: Adam Carolla; Jimmy Kimmel; Daniel Kellison; Jonathan Kimmel
- Voices of: Tony Barbieri; Adam Carolla; Susie Essman; Jim Florentine (2002–07); Jimmy Kimmel (2007); Tracy Morgan (2019–2022); Sarah Silverman (2002–05; 2019–2022); Wanda Sykes
- Theme music composer: Adam Schlesinger; Steven Gold
- Opening theme: "Crank Yankers Theme" by Fountains of Wayne
- Country of origin: United States
- No. of seasons: 6
- No. of episodes: 110

Production
- Running time: 21–22 minutes
- Production companies: Jackhole Industries (2002–07); Comedy Central (2002–05); MTV Production Development (2007); MTV2 Series Development (2007); Kimmelot (2019–2022); ITV America (2019–22); Comedy Partners (2019–2020); MTV Entertainment Studios (2021–22)

Original release
- Network: Comedy Central
- Release: June 2, 2002 – March 30, 2005
- Network: MTV2
- Release: February 9 – March 30, 2007
- Network: Comedy Central
- Release: September 25, 2019 – August 3, 2022

Crank Yankers is an American adult-oriented puppet television show produced by Adam Carolla, Jimmy Kimmel and Daniel Kellison. It features actual crank calls made by show regulars and celebrity guests, with on-screen re-enactments by puppets. The show premiered on June 2, 2002, on Comedy Central. It returned to MTV2 on February 9, 2007, running once again until March 30.

On February 11, 2019, Jimmy Kimmel announced on Jimmy Kimmel Live! that the show would be revived on Comedy Central for a fifth 20-episode season and mark the first project on Kimmel's new Kimmelot production imprint. The new season includes pranks on social media and other platforms. Kimmel's brother Jonathan Kimmel serves as the showrunner and executive producer. The fifth season premiered on September 25, 2019.

On March 5, 2020, Comedy Central announced Crank Yankers had been renewed for a 20-episode sixth season. The sixth season premiered on May 5, 2021.

== Behind the scenes ==
The performers are given a basic outline of a premise by the writers, and call telephone numbers from a list of selected targets (known as "marks"). Using the basic premises, the performers improvise most of their lines, playing off of the responses of their marks, with the intention to keep them on the phone as long as possible.

With the exception of a few outside sources (including previous material from Jim Florentine and the Touch-Tone Terrorists), all the calls are made from Nevada. The Omnibus Crime Control and Safe Streets Act of 1968 makes it illegal in eleven states to record telephone calls without both parties' consent. Under Nevada law, only one of the parties has to give consent (i.e., the caller), so prank calls can be recorded without the consent of the prank victims. One result of this was that production was fairly sporadic due to most of the celebrities living in Los Angeles and having limited availability to go to Las Vegas to make calls. Carolla, for example, took his radio program to Las Vegas once or twice a year, and while there would record new calls for the program.

The puppet designs were drawn by artist Todd James before being constructed based on the various marks' voices, and, along with a series of stock characters (such as "Niles Standish", "Bobby Fletcher" and "Special Ed") based on the performers' character voices, the calls are re-enacted for the skits.

The main character puppets for the first season were constructed by Bob Flanagan's company Den Design with additional puppets built by BJ Guyer, Carol Binion, Rick Lyon, Ron Binion, Jim Kroupa and Artie Esposito. An in-house puppet shop was set up for the following seasons to accommodate the fast-paced schedule of the show and the sheer volume of puppet characters required for each episode.

The puppets are puppeteered by Ron Binion, Rick Lyon, BJ Guyer, Victor Yerrid, Paul McGinnis, Alice Dinnean, Tyler Bunch, Drew Massey, Robin Walsh, Marc Petrosino, & Artie Esposito.

Originally, the show was titled Prank Puppets; it was renamed after Comedy Central lawyers deemed that it implied malice.

== Regular characters ==
- Karl Malone (voiced by Jimmy Kimmel): Kimmel's impression of then-NBA star Karl Malone. He regularly refers to himself in the third person. "Don't hang up on Karl Malone." Kimmel has also portrayed a live-action version of Malone on The Man Show.
- Gladys Murphy (voiced by Wanda Sykes): A boisterous black woman who makes embarrassing announcements, generally of a scatological or sexual nature. Her many children do things like gluing her buttocks to the toilet and stealing money from a malfunctioning bank machine.
- Niles Standish (voiced by Tony Barbieri): The British Earl of Yankerville, a rich and eccentric middle-aged pervert with homosexual tendencies. He frequently calls various services and asks for their price, then orders them to "double it" (Once even confusing someone by telling them to "cut it in half, and double it!"). He has an assistant named Cavendish.
- Giles Standish (voiced by Tony Barbieri): Niles' deformed twin brother.
- Special Ed (voiced by Jim Florentine): Bobby Fletcher's mentally challenged younger cousin who constantly repeats himself, makes random comments and shouts his catchphrase "Yay!" until the prank-victim gets frustrated. He makes a cameo in one of Bobby's prank calls, "Let Me Put My Brother on the Phone". In two prank calls of his own (one to a movie theater and one to a video store), Ed reveals that his favorite film is Air Bud. In the video-store call, he works in several references to The Shining. Ed is not present in the 2019 revival due to the character being deemed too offensive for modern audiences.
- Dick Birchum (voiced by Adam Carolla): A psychotic Vietnam War veteran whose hobbies include carpentry, Shotokan karate, spying on women in their beds or bathrooms by drilling holes or a hidden camera, and gun ownership. He has a 600-pound wife, a large 8-year-old son, and conjoined twin daughters. He lost part of his right leg in the war and 3 right-hand fingers in a carpentry accident. He frequently refers to his time in Vietnam and "smoking hash out of a human skull".
- Jimmy (voiced by Jimmy Kimmel): A Kimmel-based grown man who lives with his mother. He also has two young children who swear and play juvenile pranks.
- Bobby Fletcher (voiced by Jim Florentine): Ed's stoner underachieving older cousin. He is known to belch uncontrollably into the phone, which he uses to his advantage in order to annoy the victims of his prank calls.
- Elmer Higgins (voiced by Jimmy Kimmel): A crabby, elderly man (based on Kimmel's grandfather). He makes complaint calls and frequently goes off on unrelated, long-winded tangents about his younger days and various irrelevant subjects. He sometimes mentions his brother Charlie, as well as his gay grandson, Terrence Catheter.
- Helen Higgins (voiced by Susie Essman): Elmer's beautiful wife of over 60 years, she is an elderly woman who likes to proposition young men. Her son gave her a pet parrot who is well-versed in profanity. In a late-in-the-series sketch about Elmer wanting driving lessons, he mentions that she has died.
- Landalious "The Truth" Truefeld (voiced by David Alan Grier): A former football player who likes to rap.
- Spoonie Luv (voiced by Tracy Morgan): A smooth-talking African American hip hop-type character who makes lewd and suggestive comments. He often refers to himself as "Spoonie Luv from Up Above". In one particularly noteworthy prank call, he attempts to sell a video store tapes of himself masturbating.
- Hadassah Guberman (voiced by Sarah Silverman): A Jewish female college student who works various part-time jobs, including conducting surveys for O magazine. She frequently asks intrusive questions and makes veiled passive-aggressive insults. Her sexuality and sanity seem highly questionable.
- Terrence Catheter (voiced by Jimmy Kimmel): Elmer Higgins' grandson is an effeminate redhead who acts as spokesperson for various celebrities, such as Tom Cruise, Bill Cosby, Jared Fogle, J. K. Rowling, Mr. T and the Olsen twins. He calls various places of business to book appearances and asks them to comply with the celebrities' ridiculous demands.
- Tony Deloge (voiced by Bob Einstein): A loud-mouthed, fast-paced politician who calls random people to pander for votes as "district selectman". He occasionally tries to use his political power to get things for free.
- Cammie Smith (voiced by Lisa Arch): A nymphomaniac, she is a somewhat conceited, condescending 23-year-old exotic dancer.
- Boomer and the Nudge (voiced by Jimmy Kimmel and Patton Oswalt): Two obnoxious morning-radio disc jockeys who call people to make "on-air dares".
- Junkyard Willie (voiced by the Touch-Tone Terrorists): An obstructionist in the form of a gravelly-voiced black man who is actually an import from the Touch-Tone Terrorists where he is a regular character. He appears in two sketches as a supervisor at YPS ("Yankerville Package Service").
- Jim Bob the Handicapped Hillbilly (voiced by the Touch-Tone Terrorists): A mentally disabled hillbilly who works with Junkyard Willie at YPS.
- Sav Macauley (voiced by Dane Cook): The overly enthusiastic host of a phone game show, "The Phone Zone", where he calls people and asks ridiculous random trivia questions for cash prizes and interjects his own sound effects.
- OCD Ken (voiced by Kevin Nealon): An accountant with obsessive–compulsive disorder who prefers cleanliness and even numbers. He often requests people to press the pound key as part of his disorder.
- Danny (voiced by David Alan Grier): A man who repeatedly gets nervous or disgusted causing him to vomit over the phone. The vomit is depicted as an Exorcist-like liquid shooting out of the puppet's throat. On the show, there is also a minor story arc of Danny marrying a Jewish woman.
- Chip Douglas (voiced by Fred Armisen): A Mexican immigrant who is perpetually building a house with minimal supplies and poor command of the English language. He makes two prank calls to newspaper offices, one to attempt to sell cartoons and the other (a prank call in Spanish) to inform a Spanish-language newspaper that he has not received that day's edition.
- Katie (voiced by Katie Kimmel): Kimmel's then-12-year-old daughter made occasional appearances from 2003, initially with a few short lines but later making entire crank calls herself (notably pretending to be a drunken 9-year-old trying to order alcohol by phone).
- Kevin (voiced by Kevin Kimmel): Kimmel's then-10-year-old son made occasional appearances from 2003, including as Elmer Higgins' great-grandson.
- Foreign Guy (voiced by Dane Cook): A nameless immigrant who calls various places looking for assistance or to purchase something.
- Gene Winterbuck (voiced by Dane Cook): A paraplegic young man, who calls libraries requesting books with titles referring to disabilities in an offensive manner, such as "Johnny NoodleLegs".
- Lou Vilman (voiced by Kevin Nealon): An easily impressed guy who responds "Wow!" to everything.
- Dick Rogers (voiced by Seth MacFarlane): He will often call to complain about issues that would make someone from the 1940s uncomfortable, such as being hit on by men at a gay bar or getting a haircut from a female hairdresser. He also calls the YMCA for help with his alcohol problem.
- The Concierge (voiced by Tony Barbieri): A hotel concierge who calls guests informing them of issues with their room or the building and offering them little compensation, or otherwise inconveniencing their stay.

== Spinoff ==
In 2011, there was a pilot for a traditionally-animated spinoff called The Birchums featuring Dick Birchum as the main character. He was redesigned to look younger and had a mustache. The pilot was made for Fox, but was not picked up as a series. The series now retitled as Mr. Birchum was released on the conservative website The Daily Wire's streaming service DailyWire+ on May 12, 2024.

== Notable performers ==
The voices of the characters have been provided by:

Lisa Arch Fred Armisen Dave Attell Tony Barbieri Nick Cannon Drew Carey Adam Carolla Chamillionaire Dave Chappelle Stephen Colbert Dane Cook David Cross Desus & Mero DJ D-Wrek Ryan Dunn Bob Einstein Eminem Susie Essman Jim Florentine Will Forte Josh Gardner Jeff Garlin Nikki Glaser Jeff Goldblum Bobcat Goldthwait Good Charlotte Gilbert Gottfried Seth Green David Alan Grier Kathy Griffin Tiffany Haddish Caleb Hearon Mitch Hedberg Abbi Jacobson Punkie Johnson Jamie Kennedy Tom Kenny Jimmy Kimmel Jonathan Kimmel David Koechner Nick Kroll Denis Leary Natasha Leggero	Lil Jon Ludacris Seth MacFarlane Biz Markie Demetri Martin Trixie Mattel Andy Milonakis Tracy Morgan Bobby Moynihan Annie Murphy Kevin Nealon Bob Odenkirk Super Dave Osborne Jack Osbourne Sharon Osbourne Patton Oswalt Chelsea Peretti Drew Pinsky Aubrey Plaza Brian Posehn Paul Raff Andy Richter Rick Rosner Jeff Ross Robert Schimmel Jason Schwartzman Iliza Shlesinger Sarah Silverman Robert Smigel J. B. Smoove Snoop Dogg Megan Stalter Tom Stern Steve-O Nicole Sullivan Wanda Sykes Tenacious D (Jack Black and Kyle Gass) Kenan Thompson Tim & Eric (Tim Heidecker and Eric Wareheim) Touch-Tone Terrorists Billy West Roy Wood Jr. Wu-Tang Clan

Chief artists working for the show include:

Xavier Corby Chris Davis Todd Hulin Shane Klein David Kolodny-Nagy	Dutch Merrick Kristie Moore Brook Shafer Jason Tyne Mark Walbaum

== Episodes ==
Season	Episodes	Originally aired	
Season	Episodes	First aired	Last aired
1	10	June 2, 2002	August 4, 2002
2	30	March 4, 2003	April 13, 2004
3	22	July 20, 2004	March 30, 2005
4	8	February 9, 2007	March 30, 2007
5	20	September 25, 2019	June 3, 2020
6	20	May 5, 2021	August 3, 2022

=== Season 1 (2002) ===
No. overall	No. in season	Title	Original release date	Prod. code
1	1	"Wu-Tang Clan & Dave Chappelle"	June 2, 2002	103
Shavin (Dave Chappelle) makes a reservation at a bed and breakfast; Bob Carlman (Super Dave Osborne) wants to include Bobby Dick in a book about unusual names; Elmer (Jimmy Kimmel) complains about finding a beak in his fried chicken; Hadassah (Sarah Silverman) responds to a newspaper ad for a nanny; Rob (Stephen Colbert) helps a deaf friend with phone sex; Wu-Tang Clan performs "In the Hood". NOTE: Wu-Tang Clan's performance is cut from the DVD version of this episode.
2	2	"Denis Leary & Sarah Silverman"	June 9, 2002	102
Cammie (Lisa Kushell) wants to perform at a strip club with her seeing-eye dog; a kid (Billy West) calls a Chinese restaurant; Boomer (Patton Oswalt) and the Nudge (Jimmy Kimmel) call a listener at a convenience store; Spoonie Luv (Tracy Morgan) wants to send flowers to his unfaithful girlfriend; Jimmy (Jimmy Kimmel) calls a sex shop, and his mom (Sarah Silverman) is on the same line; Joe (Denis Leary) deals with a pet monkey who's going crazy; Special Ed (Jim Florentine) calls tech support.
3	3	"Tenacious D & Wanda Sykes"	June 16, 2002	101
Elmer (Jimmy Kimmel) tries to get an apartment for him and his pets; a turd is left in Gladys Murphy's (Wanda Sykes) car; a villain (Jordan Rubin) calls 411 for information on Batman; Birchum (Adam Carolla) applies for a job at a construction place; Mooshu (Billy West) calls a record store to get a Tupac album; Elmer (Jimmy Kimmel) tries to get an apartment at another place; Special Ed (Jim Florentine) books a trip to Hawaii; Tenacious D performs "Friendship".
4	4	"Jimmy Kimmel & Wanda Sykes"	June 23, 2002	104
Spoonie Luv (Tracy Morgan) calls a country club to play golf; Elmer (Jimmy Kimmel) tries to schedule an appointment for a hearing aid; Wanda (Wanda Sykes) thanks a customer for visiting a porn site; Niles Standish (Tony Barbieri) calls for a live-in caregiver; a woman calls the Touch-Tone Terrorists about a diamond watch.
5	5	"David Alan Grier & Dave Attell"	June 30, 2002	105
Bobby Fletcher (Jim Florentine) tries to get a job at an apartment complex; Lisa (Lisa Kushell) needs help with her computer; Frank (Dave Attell) inquires about hair removal; Birchum (Adam Carolla) calls a country club's lost and found for his prosthetic leg; Terrence (Jimmy Kimmel) makes a reservation at a restaurant for Bill Cosby; Danny (David Alan Grier) calls a phone sex line.
6	6	"Susie Essman & Jim Florentine"	July 7, 2002	106
A woman calls the Touch-Tone Terrorists about a package to her sister; Niles Standish (Tony Barbieri) orders invitations for an ass-slapping party; Helen Higgins (Susie Essman) wants to re-train a foul-mouthed parrot; Bobby Fletcher (Jim Florentine) calls to get a job at an alternative counseling center; Tony DeLoge (Super Dave Osborne) tries to secure a vote by surrounding a couple's son.
7	7	"Dane Cook & Ween"	July 14, 2002	107
Hadassah (Sarah Silverman) conducts a survey with Oprah Magazine; Spoonie Luv (Tracy Morgan) pitches greeting card ideas; Sav Macauley (Dane Cook) hosts the Phone Zone game show; Bobby Fletcher (Jim Florentine) drowns his grandfather while calling a cell phone store; Ween performs "Hey There Fancypants".
8	8	"Kevin Nealon & Super Dave Osborne"	July 21, 2002	108
Spoonie Luv (Tracy Morgan) places a personal ad; Mark (Super Dave Osborne) seeks advice about his wife sleeping with another man; Helen (Susie Essman) calls a supermarket about cookies; Ken (Kevin Nealon) seeks a date; Terrence (Jimmy Kimmel) arranges an appearance by Jared Fogle.
9	9	"Jimmy Kimmel & Adam Carolla"	July 28, 2002	109
Karl Malone (Jimmy Kimmel) is looking for Beanie Babies; Bobby Fletcher (Jim Florentine) seeks a job at an auto repair shop; Hadassah (Sarah Silverman) calls from municipal waste management; Birchum (Adam Carolla) gets a moving estimate for his morbidly obese wife; Danny (David Allan Grier) calls a caterer for a family reunion; Elmer (Jimmy Kimmel) complains about an offensive program (implied to be Crank Yankers itself) to a cable company.
10	10	"Dane Cook & Sarah Silverman"	August 4, 2002	110
Elmer (Jimmy Kimmel) complains about a delivery man urinating on his front door; Spoonie Luv (Tracy Morgan) orders roses for a girl; Gene Winterbuck (Dane Cook) calls a library to request a book; Hadassah (Sarah Silverman) complains to a beauty salon about crabs; Sav Macauley (Dane Cook) breaches a do-not call list to get someone to play the Phone Zone game show; Tony DeLoge (Super Dave Osborne) talks about his platform's policies for senior citizens.

=== Season 2 (2003–04) ===
No. overall	No. in season	Title	Original release date
11	1	"Jimmy Kimmel & Sarah Silverman"	March 4, 2003
Birchum (Adam Carolla) calls for a job at a security office who is not hiring; Niles Standish (Tony Barbieri) asks for advice about caulk from a hardware store; Katie and Kevin Kimmel are asked to confess to a store employee; Hadassah (Sarah Silverman) calls a lost and found for a missing poker chip; Elmer (Jimmy Kimmel) calls a sex shop to find a gift for his wife; Special Ed (Jim Florentine) calls a record store asking for a specific song.
12	2	"Wanda Sykes & Robert Schimmel"	March 11, 2003
Gladys Murphy (Wanda Sykes) accidentally rents a pornographic video for a birthday party; Bobby Fletcher (Jim Florentine) calls about a sales job; Robert (Robert Schimmel) calls a phone sex line; Spoonie Luv (Tracy Morgan) wants karate lessons before he goes to jail; Terrence (Jimmy Kimmel) plans to rent out a candy store for Rosie O'Donnell's birthday; Niles Standish (Tony Barbieri) calls a chamber of commerce to set up a rehab center for violent, dangerous sex offenders.
13	3	"Snoop Dogg & Kevin Nealon"	March 18, 2003
Ken (Kevin Nealon) calls for phone sex and is incredibly nervous; Snoop Dogg runs for state senator; Special Ed (Jim Florentine) asks for movie ticket prices; Hadassah (Sarah Silverman) complains about a lingerie store employee's conduct; Birchum (Adam Carolla) wants to take his wife horse riding; Kevin Kimmel asks a librarian for word definitions; Snoop Dogg calls a record store.
14	4	"Jeff Garlin & Gilbert Gottfried"	March 25, 2003
Terrence (Jimmy Kimmel) plans to take the Olsen Twins to play paintball; Bobby Fletcher (Jim Florentine) runs over someone while calling the water company; Elmer (Jimmy Kimmel) can't play a videotape on his DVD player; Jeff (Jeff Garlin) calls a variety store; Cammie (Lisa Kushell) orders pizza and her boyfriend (Jimmy Kimmel) gets angry; Tony DeLoge (Super Dave Osborne) wants a set of golf clubs; George (Gilbert Gottfried) calls a nutrition center about his swollen testicles.
15	5	"Fred Armisen & Kevin Nealon"	April 1, 2003
Niles Standish (Tony Barbieri) wants a portrait done; Special Ed (Jim Florentine) tells a knock-knock joke; Chip Douglas (Fred Armisen) is building a house; Dom (Dom Irrera) accuses someone of hitting his car; Birchum (Adam Carolla) details his alien encounter; Hadassah (Sarah Silverman) complains to a department store about being sprayed with perfume; Ken (Kevin Nealon) tries to hire a new maid.
16	6	"Wanda Sykes & Bobcat Goldthwait"	April 8, 2003
Boomer (Patton Oswalt) and the Nudge (Jimmy Kimmel) pose as mall employees and accuse a woman's husband of shoplifting carpenter pants; Steven Goldstein (Bobcat Goldthwait) tries to get an agent for his "impressiomedian" act; Landalious "The Truth" Truefeld (David Alan Grier) offers to be a spokesperson for a sporting goods store; Niles Standish (Tony Barbieri) books a trip to a dude ranch; a foreign guy (Dane Cook) arranges to buy a used car; Gladys (Wanda Sykes) gets glued to a toilet seat.
17	7	"Adam Carolla & Jim Florentine"	April 15, 2003
Birchum (Adam Carolla) calls to sign his conjoined twin daughters up for swimming lessons; Al Foster gets a call from two other people who share the same name as him (David Wein and Michael Ian Black); Katie (Katie Kimmel) calls a pet store about an fake incident with his brother’s pet snake; Bobby Fletcher (Jim Florentine) calls for financial advice; Cammie (Lisa Kushell) tries to apply for college; Elmer (Jimmy Kimmel) reports an incident at the park with a black man masturbating; Spoony Luv (Tracy Morgan) calls a grocery store about a rash he got from the barbecue sauce he bought.
18	8	"Adam Carolla & Dr. Drew Pinsky"	April 22, 2003
19	9	"Jimmy Kimmel & David Alan Grier"	April 29, 2003
20	10	"Fred Armisen & Sarah Silverman"	May 6, 2003
21	11	"Jimmy Kimmel & Fred Armisen"	September 16, 2003
22	12	"Wanda Sykes & Kevin Nealon"	September 23, 2003
23	13	"Adam Carolla & Kevin Kimmel"	September 30, 2003
24	14	"Jimmy Kimmel & Gilbert Gottfried"	October 7, 2003
25	15	"David Alan Grier & Super Dave Osborne"	October 14, 2003
26	16	"Robert Smigel & Wanda Sykes"	October 21, 2003
27	17	"David Alan Grier & Jeff Garlin"	October 28, 2003
28	18	"Jimmy Kimmel & Adam Carolla"	November 4, 2003
29	19	"Bob Odenkirk & Fred Armisen"	November 11, 2003
30	20	"Jim Florentine & Kathy Griffin"	November 18, 2003
31	21	"Sarah Silverman & David Alan Grier"	February 10, 2004
32	22	"Kevin Nealon & Wanda Sykes"	February 17, 2004
33	23	"Jamie Kennedy & David Alan Grier"	February 24, 2004
34	24	"Wanda Sykes & Kevin Nealon"	March 2, 2004
35	25	"Adam Carolla & David Alan Grier"	March 9, 2004
36	26	"Sarah Silverman & Jeff Goldblum"	March 16, 2004
37	27	"Seth Green & Jamie Kennedy"	March 23, 2004
38	28	"Wanda Sykes & Adam Carolla"	March 30, 2004
39	29	"Kevin Nealon & Sarah Silverman"	April 6, 2004
40	30	"Jimmy Kimmel & Fred Armisen"	April 13, 2004

=== Season 3 (2004–05) ===
No. overall	No. in season	Title	Original release date
41	1	"Ludacris & Drew Carey"	July 20, 2004
42	2	"Tracy Morgan & Adam Carolla"	July 27, 2004
43	3	"Andy Richter & Sarah Silverman"	August 3, 2004
44	4	"Jimmy Kimmel & Adam Carolla"	August 10, 2004
45	5	"Jimmy Kimmel & Kevin Nealon"	August 17, 2004
46	6	"Wanda Sykes & Kevin Nealon"	August 24, 2004
47	7	"Bob Odenkirk & Adam Carolla"	August 31, 2004
48	8	"Ludacris & Kevin Nealon"	September 7, 2004
49	9	"Eminem & Tracy Morgan"	September 14, 2004
50	10	"Jack & Sharon Osbourne"	September 21, 2004
51	11	"Holiday Special"	December 21, 2004
52	12	"Drew Carey & Jeff Goldblum"	January 12, 2005
53	13	"Wanda Sykes & Sarah Silverman"	January 19, 2005
54	14	"Tracy Morgan & Jimmy Kimmel"	February 2, 2005
55	15	"Jason Schwartzman & David Alan Grier"	February 9, 2005
56	16	"Adam Carolla & David Alan Grier"	February 16, 2005
57	17	"Tracy Morgan & Jimmy Kimmel"	February 23, 2005
58	18	"Wanda Sykes & Kevin Nealon"	March 2, 2005
59	19	"Bob Odenkirk & Tracy Morgan"	March 9, 2005
60	20	"Dane Cook & Kevin Nealon"	March 16, 2005
61	21	"Best-of Special 1"	March 23, 2005
62	22	"Best-of Special 2"	March 30, 2005

=== Season 4 (2007) ===
No. overall	No. in season	Title	Original release date
63	1	"Lil Jon & Sarah Silverman"	February 9, 2007
64	2	"Jimmy Kimmel & Steve-O"	February 16, 2007
65	3	"Dane Cook & Chamillionaire"	February 23, 2007
66	4	"Good Charlotte & Lil Jon"	March 2, 2007
67	5	"Dave Chappelle & Seth Green"	March 9, 2007
68	6	"Andy Milonakis & Ryan Dunn"	March 16, 2007
69	7	"Adam Carolla & Dane Cook"	March 23, 2007
70	8	"Jimmy Kimmel & Nick Cannon"	March 30, 2007

=== Season 5 (2019–20) ===
No. overall	No. in season	Title	Original release date	U.S. viewers (millions)
71	1	"Tracy Morgan, Adam Carolla & Aubrey Plaza"	September 25, 2019	0.482
72	2	"Jimmy Kimmel, Kathy Griffin & Jeff Ross"	October 2, 2019	0.366
73	3	"Sarah Silverman, Abbi Jacobson & Will Forte"	October 9, 2019	0.380
74	4	"Jimmy Kimmel, Tracy Morgan & David Alan Grier"	October 16, 2019	0.409
75	5	"Sarah Silverman, Tiffany Haddish & Kevin Nealon"	October 30, 2019	0.364
76	6	"David Alan Grier, Will Forte & Chelsea Peretti"	November 6, 2019	0.397
77	7	"Tiffany Haddish, Roy Wood Jr. & Thomas Lennon"	November 13, 2019	0.358
78	8	"Wanda Sykes, Nick Kroll & Tracy Morgan"	November 27, 2019	0.305
79	9	"Adam Carolla, David Koechner & Natasha Leggero"	December 4, 2019	0.368
80	10	"Bobby Brown, Wanda Sykes & Kathy Griffin"	December 11, 2019	0.352
81	11	"Jimmy Kimmel, Sarah Silverman & Nikki Glaser"	April 1, 2020	0.269
82	12	"Aubrey Plaza, Ron Funches & Derek Waters"	April 8, 2020	0.327
83	13	"Tracy Morgan, Kevin Nealon & Adam Carolla"	April 15, 2020	0.321
84	14	"Chelsea Peretti, Derek Waters & Aubrey Plaza"	April 22, 2020	0.272
85	15	"Jeff Ross, Tracy Morgan & Roy Wood Jr."	April 29, 2020	0.173
86	16	"Wanda Sykes, David Alan Grier & Abbi Jacobson"	May 6, 2020	0.220
87	17	"Kevin Nealon, Jimmy Kimmel & Paul Scheer"	May 13, 2020	0.187
88	18	"Brian Posehn, Nick Kroll & David Alan Grier"	May 20, 2020	0.199
89	19	"Adam Carolla, Iliza Shlesinger & Demetri Martin"	May 27, 2020	0.236
90	20	"Nikki Glaser, Jimmy Kimmel & Tracy Morgan"	June 3, 2020	0.215

=== Season 6 (2021–22) ===
No. overall	No. in season	Title	Original release date	U.S. viewers (millions)
91	1	"Jimmy Kimmel, Annie Murphy & Iliza Shlesinger"	May 5, 2021	0.155
92	2	"Adam Carolla, Punkie Johnson & Melissa Villaseñor"	May 12, 2021	0.147
93	3	"Chelsea Peretti, Heidi Gardner & J.B. Smoove"	May 19, 2021	0.151
94	4	"Jimmy Kimmel, Wanda Sykes & Kathy Griffin"	May 26, 2021	0.209
95	5	"Bobby Brown, Natasha Leggero, Paul Scheer"	June 2, 2021	0.129
96	6	"Brian Posehn, Kevin Nealon, Quinta Brunson"	June 9, 2021	0.179
97	7	"Tiffany Haddish, Tracy Morgan, Jimmy Kimmel"	June 16, 2021	0.166
98	8	"Kathy Griffin, Trixie Mattel & Chelsea Peretti"	June 23, 2021	0.132
99	9	"Jimmy Kimmel, Bobby Brown & Kyle Dunnigan"	June 30, 2021	0.110
100	10	"Wanda Sykes, Adam Carolla & Annie Murphy"	July 7, 2021	0.131
101	11	"Jimmy Kimmel, Annie Murphy & Tiffany Haddish"	July 6, 2022	0.170
102	12	"Tiffany Haddish, Desus & Mero & Jimmy Kimmel"	July 6, 2022	0.131
103	13	"Desus & Mero, Jimmy Kimmel & Natasha Leggero"	July 13, 2022	0.118
104	14	"Wanda Sykes, JB Smoove & Adam Carolla"	July 13, 2022	0.093
105	15	"Jimmy Kimmel, Tiffany Haddish & Ron Funches"	July 21, 2022	0.116
106	16	"Tracy Morgan, Heidi Gardner & Kevin Nealon"	July 21, 2022	0.105
107	17	"Paul Scheer, Wanda Sykes & Ron Funches"	July 28, 2022	0.099
108	18	"Tiffany Haddish, Meg Stalter & Bobby Moynihan"	July 28, 2022	0.155
109	19	"Bobby Brown, Heidi Gardner & Jimmy Kimmel"	August 3, 2022	0.112
110	20	"Tracy Morgan, Tim and Eric & Ron Funches"	August 3, 2022	0.116

== DVD releases ==
DVD name	Release date	Ep #	Additional information
Season 1 - Uncensored	September 28, 2004	10	"Dial 'T' for Torment: Mini-Documentary, Two Unaired Calls.
Season 2, Volume 1 - Uncensored	April 26, 2005	15	Unaired Calls.
Season 2, Volume 2 - Uncensored	November 29, 2005	15	4 exclusive audio calls from Fred Armisen, Eminem, Jim Florentine, and Jimmy Kimmel.
The Best of Crank Yankers - Uncensored	December 4, 2007	58	Includes 58 favorite calls.

There are currently no plans for a DVD release for seasons 3 & 4, aka the MTV2 season of Crank Yankers.

== CD releases ==
- The Best Uncensored Crank Calls, Volume 1 (2002)
- The Best Uncensored Crank Calls, Volume 2 (2002)
- The Best Uncensored Crank Calls, Volume 3 (2003)
