= Personal Audio LLC (patent holding company) =

Beaumont, Texas-based company

- Company type: Private company
- Founded: Beaumont, Texas, United States (1996)
- Headquarters: 550 Fannin Street; Suite 1313; Beaumont, TX
- Key people: James Logan, Founder
- Products: Patents 6,199,076, 7,509,178 and 8,112,504, and their enforcement
- Website: http://personalaudio.net

Personal Audio LLC is a Beaumont, Texas-based company that enforces and earns licensing revenue from five patents. The company has often been accused of being a patent troll, making money solely through royalties on frivolous and sweeping patents.

== History ==
The history of Personal Audio began on October 2, 1996, when James Logan, Daniel F. Goessling and Charles G. Call filed patents 6,199,076, "An audio program and message distribution system in which a host system organizes and transmits program segments to client subscriber locations," and 7,509,178, "An audio program and message distribution system in which a host system organizes and transmits program segments to client subscriber locations." Patent 6,199,076 was granted on March 6, 2001, and 7,509,178 on March 24, 2009. Personal Audio LLC was listed as the assignee.

In 2009, Personal Audio sued Apple for $84 million in damages, was awarded $8 million, and immediately sued Apple for additional devices it claimed were not covered in the original settlement.

== Adam Carolla lawsuit ==
In 2013, Personal Audio filed a patent infringement lawsuit against Lotzi Digital, Inc., producers of The Adam Carolla Show and several other podcasts on the Carolla Digital Network. The suit alleged that owner Adam Carolla and his network of content infringed on Personal Audio's patent 8,112,504.

Using the crowdfunding site FundAnything.com, listeners have contributed more than $475,000 (as of August 2014) to support Carolla throughout the legal proceedings.

Personal Audio dropped the lawsuit July 29, 2014, stating that the defendants were not "making significant money from infringing Personal Audio's patents". However, Carolla countersued, having already spent hundreds of thousands of dollars mounting a defense against claims he deemed unfounded. Among claims sought by the countersuit is a request that the initial patent be invalidated. On August 15, 2014, Carolla and Personal Audio filed a joint motion to dismiss after reaching a settlement, the details of which are confidential, but include a six-week "quiet period" during which neither party could speak to the media. Both parties' claims were dropped without prejudice, and as such can be re-filed at a later date.

== EFF challenge ==
On April 10, 2015, based on a challenge by the Electronic Frontier Foundation, the United States Patent and Trademark Office revoked five provisions of Personal Audio's podcasting-related patent, 8,112,504. On May 14, 2018, the Supreme Court rejected Personal Audio's petition for review, thus invalidating all the patent claims the latter had asserted over podcasters.
