= Sports Show with Norm Macdonald =

2011 American sports comedy series

- Genre: Comedy; Satire; Sport News parody
- Created by: Norm Macdonald; Daniel Kellison; Mike Gibbons; Lori Jo Hoekstra
- Directed by: Lenn Goodside
- Presented by: Norm Macdonald
- Country of origin: United States
- No. of seasons: 1
- No. of episodes: 9

Production
- Executive producers: Marc Gurvitz; Lori Jo Hoekstra; Daniel Kellison; Norm Macdonald; Jimmy Kimmel; Adam Carolla
- Running time: 22 minutes

Original release
- Network: Comedy Central
- Release: April 12 – June 7, 2011

Related
- SNL's "Weekend Update"; The Norm Show

Sports Show with Norm Macdonald is a sports comedy television program that aired on Tuesdays at 10:30 p.m. ET on Comedy Central from April 12, 2011, to June 7, 2011. The show lampooned the world of sports using web videos and field segments. Comedian and former Saturday Night Live "Weekend Update" anchor Norm Macdonald hosted the show. As host of Sports Show, Macdonald is described as a "gleeful, equal-opportunity offender who is back in his element making snarky asides at the absurd excesses of the sports biz," according to TVGuide's Matt Roush.

== History ==
The show premiered on April 12, 2011, on the American cable network Comedy Central, and on April 13, 2011, on the Canadian cable television channel The Comedy Network. Comedy Central ordered nine episodes of the show, all taped on Monday nights in front of a live studio audience; however, Macdonald "wanted to (broadcast) live." In June 2011, it was announced that Comedy Central would not be renewing the show for a second season, reportedly due to relatively low ratings, even though Sports Show steadily averaged one million viewers per episode.

== Episode format ==
Episodes of the Sports Show feature Macdonald in a role reminiscent of his time as Saturday Night Live's Weekend Update news anchor, but now covering topical and controversial sports-related stories with his signature smirk and absurdist dry spin, according to Craig Sanger of the Washington Times. The show's segments consist of topical sports humor, wacky field segments, and long form comedic rants.

=== Weekly recurring segments ===
- Headlines: Features the familiar feel of Macdonald spouting off quick, topical one-liners behind a news desk in front of a video monitor, riffing on current sports events.
- Wide World of Sports Show: Macdonald riffs on sports-related video clips from across the world.
- Wait, what?: Features an outrageous sports related clip of the week, with Macdonald stopping the clip at particularly outrageous spots by exclaiming "Wait, what?" For example, during the May 3, 2011, episode, Macdonald features a video-clip of lawyer Gloria Allred's press conference discussing an incident with Atlanta Braves Pitching Coach Roger McDowell. Ms. Allred alleged McDowell simulated gay sex using a baseball bat and his hand in front of her client and his two 9-year-old girls. She demanded that McDowell apologize for traumatizing the young girls; however, Ms. Allred then grabbed a baseball bat and, with the aid of the hand of the young girls' father, proceeded to reenact the simulated gay sex in front of the young girls, over and over again. Macdonald is baffled and interrupts this video clip in horror many times by exclaiming, "Wait, what?"
- What the H: Features a free-form rant focusing on and reacting to one particular topic from recent sports news, ending with Macdonald proclaiming "What the H!" For example, during the May 17, 2011, episode, Macdonald discusses Michael Jordan's new Hitler-like mustache in his recent Hanes' commercial. Macdonald rants that the commercial's director, upon seeing Jordan's new mustache, must have exclaimed, "'Good lord! His upper lip is sporting the most universally recognized symbol of evil ever known to man!' What the H!"
- Garbage Time: The last large segment of the show, where Macdonald starts a count-down clock and proceeds to do a "lightning round" of non sequitur jokes, random thoughts and trash talk.

=== Recurring (but infrequent) segments ===
- Breaking News from the Future: While discussing a current sports topic, Macdonald is interrupted by his future self (dressed in a futuristic metallic outfit) reporting on future developments of the current topic. For example, during the May 17, 2011, episode, Macdonald was reporting on the Los Angeles Lakers losing the NBA playoffs to the Mavericks. While reporting on Maverick's coach Rick Carlisle's comments, about Phil Jackson's retirement, that "Phil Jackson will get tired of smoking Peyote and return to coaching," Macdonald is suddenly interrupted by "Breaking News from the Future." The future Macdonald then reports that, "Phil Jackson has not gotten tired of smoking Peyote and has not returned to coaching."
- Nephew Kyle: Macdonald's "nephew" (played by actor Kyle Mooney) reports badly from the field.
- Oh, Google!: Macdonald points out Google's "did you mean" suggestions for various sports searches, then ends the segment by exclaiming, "Oh, Google!" For example, during the May 17, 2011 episode, Macdonald did a Google search for "WNBA statistics" and Google returned with "did you mean: NBA statistics." However, the next day, Google corrected this and no longer returns with the suggestion "did you mean: NBA" when doing "WNBA" searches.
- Which fan had the better night?: Two clips are shown of two fans at sporting events, then Macdonald asks, "Which fan had the better night?" It is obvious which fan he is going to pick as having had the better night.
- You just got Pau'd!: Norm walks around Los Angeles with Pau Gasol impersonator Michael Fanter, asking random individuals if they know who he is. If they reply, "Pau Gasol", Norm says, "Really, then you just got Pau'd! This is...wait, what was your name again? Michael Fanter."

=== Blake Like Me sketch ===
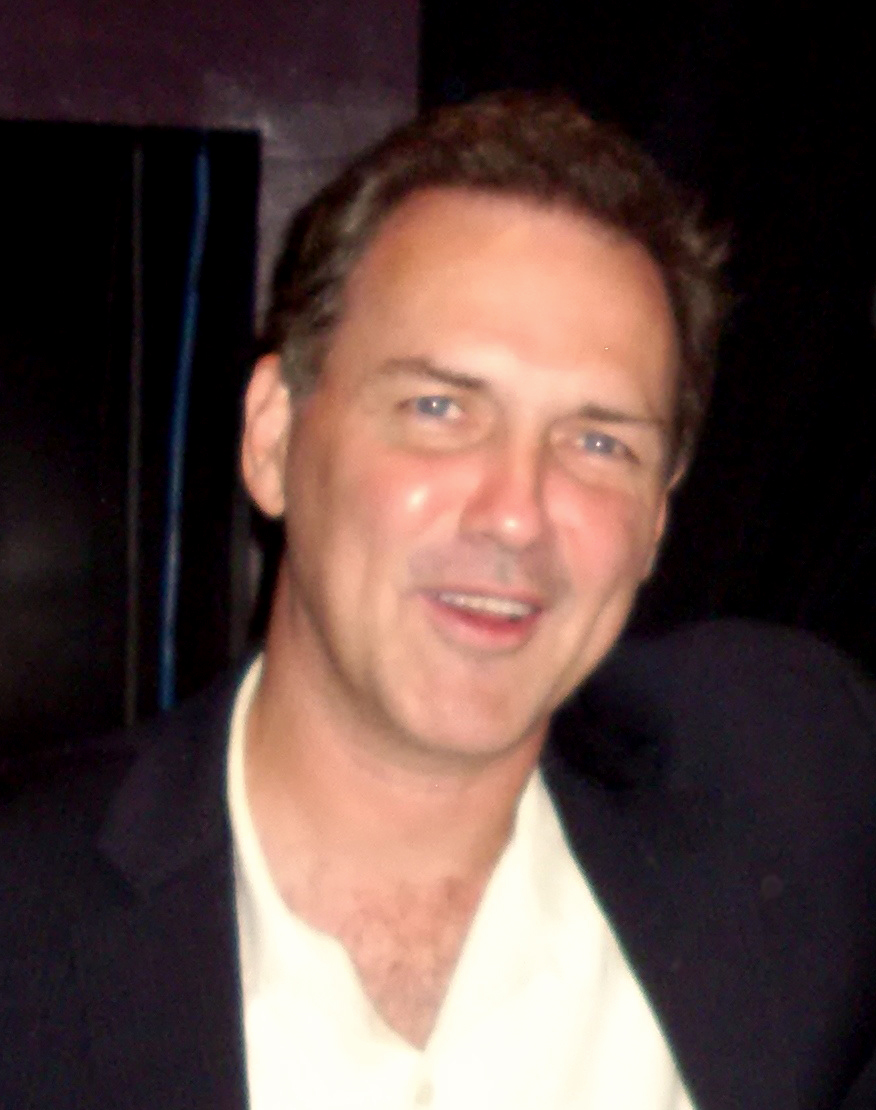
Norm Macdonald: Host of Comedy Central's Sports Show with Norm Macdonald.

During the premiere episode, Los Angeles Clippers players DeAndre Jordan and Blake Griffin were featured in a sketch called "Blake Like Me." The sketch also featured Macdonald, who hired a makeup artist to disguise him as Blake Griffin so he could go undercover in the NBA. Macdonald's undercover-Griffin then joins his teammate Jordan on the practice court, and Macdonald's voice is dubbed-in for the undercover-Griffin. Jordan can't understand why his teammate is playing so poorly (i.e. airballs, awkward moments and even a sky-hook), until the real Blake Griffin enters the practice court and the undercover-Griffin runs away when confronted.

=== Running gags ===
Macdonald sometimes uses running gags during the show.

- Medical Correspondent Burgess Meredith: After discussing a sports topic involving a leg injury, Macdonald says, "We now go to Medical Correspondent Burgess Meredith," then turns to an image of Burgess Meredith and asks him for a diagnosis. The image is a short clip of Meredith, from the movie Rocky, sternly admonishing Rocky not to have sex because "women weaken legs." For example, during the May 17, 2011, episode, Macdonald asks Meredith what could be causing pain in Tiger Woods' left leg. Meredith's diagnosis: "Women weaken legs."
- Sad Bill Cosby: After discussing a sports topic, Macdonald says, "We now go to Legal Correspondent Sad Bill Cosby," then turns to an image of Bill Cosby and asks him yes-or-no questions. The image is a short clip of Cosby shaking his head "no" with a disgruntled look on his face during a previous appearance on Larry King Live.
- Sad Jack Nicholson: After discussing a sports topic, Macdonald says, "We now go to NBA Correspondent Sad Jack Nicholson," then turns to an image of Jack Nicholson and asks him yes-or-no questions. The image is a short clip of Nicholson shaking his head "no" with a disgruntled look on his face.

== Ratings ==
- The 4-12-2011 premiere of Sports Show with Norm Macdonald drew 1.011 million viewers, 0.6/2 adults 18–49.
- The 5-3-2011 episode (4th episode) drew 0.980 million viewers, 0.5/1 adults 18–49, 0.7/1 HH, 1.0/3 M18-34.
- The 5-24-2011 episode (7th episode) drew 1.007 million viewers, 0.5/1 adults 18–49, 0.7/1 HH.
- The 6-7-2011 episode (9th episode) drew 0.944 million viewers, 0.5/1 adults 18–49, 0.7/1 HH, 1.0/3 M18-34
