= The Adam Carolla Project =

American reality television series

- Created by: Adam Carolla
- Starring: Adam Carolla
- Country of origin: United States
- No. of seasons: 1
- No. of episodes: 13

Production
- Running time: 60 minutes

Original release
- Network: TLC
- Release: October 5 – December 28, 2005

The Adam Carolla Project is an American reality television series featuring comedian Adam Carolla. The series aired on TLC from October to December 2005.

== Overview ==
Before gaining celebrity on Loveline and The Man Show, Carolla worked as a carpenter for several years. In this series, he returns to the profession by purchasing his father's house on Hartsook Street in Valley Village, California for $739,500 and paying all expenses out of his own pocket to have it renovated. The show co-stars friends from his construction days, who do much of the renovation. The footage is a mix of celebreality television and real-life construction.

== Rebroadcast ==
The DIY Network picked up the broadcast rights to The Adam Carolla Project in 2011. The first episode aired on October 8, 2011 in the 10PM timeslot. The episodes have been edited down from the original 60 minute broadcast time to a 30-minute format. All personal segments about Adam Carolla, his assistant Matt, his wife Lynette and his other jobs have been removed from the show. It is strictly about the construction work on his childhood home.
