= Catch a Contractor =

American reality television series

- Genre: Reality
- Starring: Adam Carolla; Alison Bedell; Skip Bedell
- Country of origin: United States
- Original language: English
- No. of seasons: 3
- No. of episodes: 32

Production
- Executive producers: Adam Carolla; Brant Pinvidic; D.J. Nurre; J.D. Roth; Todd A. Nelson; Andrew Scheer
- Running time: 22 minutes (1st season), 44 minutes (future seasons)
- Production company: 3 Ball Entertainment

Original release
- Network: Spike
- Release: March 9, 2014 – August 30, 2015

Catch a Contractor is an American reality television home improvement series that premiered March 9, 2014, on Spike. The show features former carpenter Adam Carolla, licensed contractor Skip Bedell and his wife Alison, a private investigator. The series premiere was the most watched debut of a Spike original series since March 2011.

== Background ==
Prior to becoming a star, Adam Carolla gained construction experience working as a carpenter. Skip Bedell is a licensed home improvement contractor and FOX & Friends contributor, Alison Bedell is a full-time probation officer, and licensed private investigator.

== Format ==
Each episode of Catch a Contractor follows a similar formula. At the beginning of each episode, Adam and Skip meet with the homeowner for that particular episode. They receive a rundown of what was supposed to be done, inspect what was left from the work that was done, and learn about the contractor and how much he was paid to do the work. Once they have all the information they need, they pass information along to Alison, Skip's wife, who is a licensed private investigator. She then goes to work tracking down the elusive contractor.

After observing the contractor for a few days, Alison sets up an appointment with the contractor, which is actually a sting operation, where the contractor is lured to a house with the expectation of giving a new job estimate. Alison makes sure the house is rigged with hidden cameras, so that when the contractor arrives, he will not suspect that he is being set up for a confrontation. While the whole camera and production crew are hiding, Alison lures the shoddy contractor into the house and gets (him) in position to be pounced upon by Adam and Skip. In the first season, she would do the luring herself. In the second and third seasons, she has an assistant do the lure due to her becoming more recognizable as a result of her work with the show. Once the contractor is placed into position, Adam and Skip confront the contractor with the camera and sound crew, and questions him about what they know while the homeowner watches on monitors from another room. The contractor is ultimately given three options. The first is to return the money that the homeowner paid him, the second is to go back to the unfinished job and complete the work properly while Adam and Skip supervise. The third is to walk away and do nothing, in which case the homeowners would file a suit in civil court with the assistance of the show. In most cases, the contractor agrees to return to the homeowner's residence and fix the job. Once there, the homeowner can confront him about his shoddy work and the arguments often get heated. The homeowner is then led off the property and put up in a hotel for however long it takes to do the job, which is performed by Skip and his crew, with or without the cooperation from the contractor. Once the job is done, the homeowner returns home to see the finished product, and the episode closes with one final confrontation where the contractor has an opportunity to apologize for his actions, regardless of whether he is sincere, or whether the homeowner accepts it.

Starting with the third season, events behind the scenes are shown, breaking the "fourth wall", including interactions with the producers and texts describing the full extent of each job.

== Broadcast ==
The series premiered on March 9, 2014. In April 2014, Spike renewed Catch a Contractor for a second season and expanded the episodes' length to sixty minutes from thirty. In December 2014, Spike ordered a third season of Catch a Contractor, the first episode of which aired on June 21, 2015 and premiered to 748,000 viewers.

Internationally, the series premiered in Australia on A&E on September 22, 2015, and has since been syndicated in Italy, Europe, Great Britain, the Middle East and Canada.

On May 1, 2016, Carolla confirmed via his verified Twitter account that Catch a Contractor would not return.

== Lawsuits ==
In May 2013, Catch a Contractor performed a repair at the home of Rochelle Kirk and Scott Waters of Covina, California, whose bathroom had been torn apart and abandoned by a scheming contractor. Although the repair was completed, they alleged a sewer pipe that was moved during the job was never reconnected, resulting in two hundred gallons of raw sewage spilling into the home undetected. Kirk and Waters filed suit against Viacom and several contractors in February 2014 for $2.87 million, citing the network's refusal to respond to their reports of the situation and a claim that several contractors that helped perform the repair were not licensed. In May 2014, the suit was dismissed due to releases the Plaintiffs had previously signed, and because the Defendants' actions were agreed to be "in furtherance of free speech rights" and protected under California's "anti-SLAPP" statute. Plaintiffs were ordered to pay defendants legal fees.

Another lawsuit was filed in March 2015, which cites defamation, fraud, false imprisonment, and violation of right to name or likeness. According to the contractor, he began working on remodeling the client's’ house in July 2013. In September of that year, a building inspector flagged a framing issue, requiring an engineering proposal. The contractor alleged the clients moved into the home in spite of the fact that the repair had not been made, and then, in October 2013, stopped payment and ultimately canceled his contract. Instead of receiving a check for a new client, he was instead met with the hosts as well as a "bouncer" that prevented him from leaving the premises. It goes on to further allege that Adam promised that by signing a release, there would be no further repercussions (along with a $10,000 payout for appearing on the show). However, the plaintiff alleged that bid bond was revised by the homeowners just days later, and alleged he was instead "painted in an unfairly negative light" and labeled as a "criminal" by hosts and clients. This case has since been dismissed by the Court with no settlements being awarded.
