= Adam Carolla =

American comedian (born 1964)

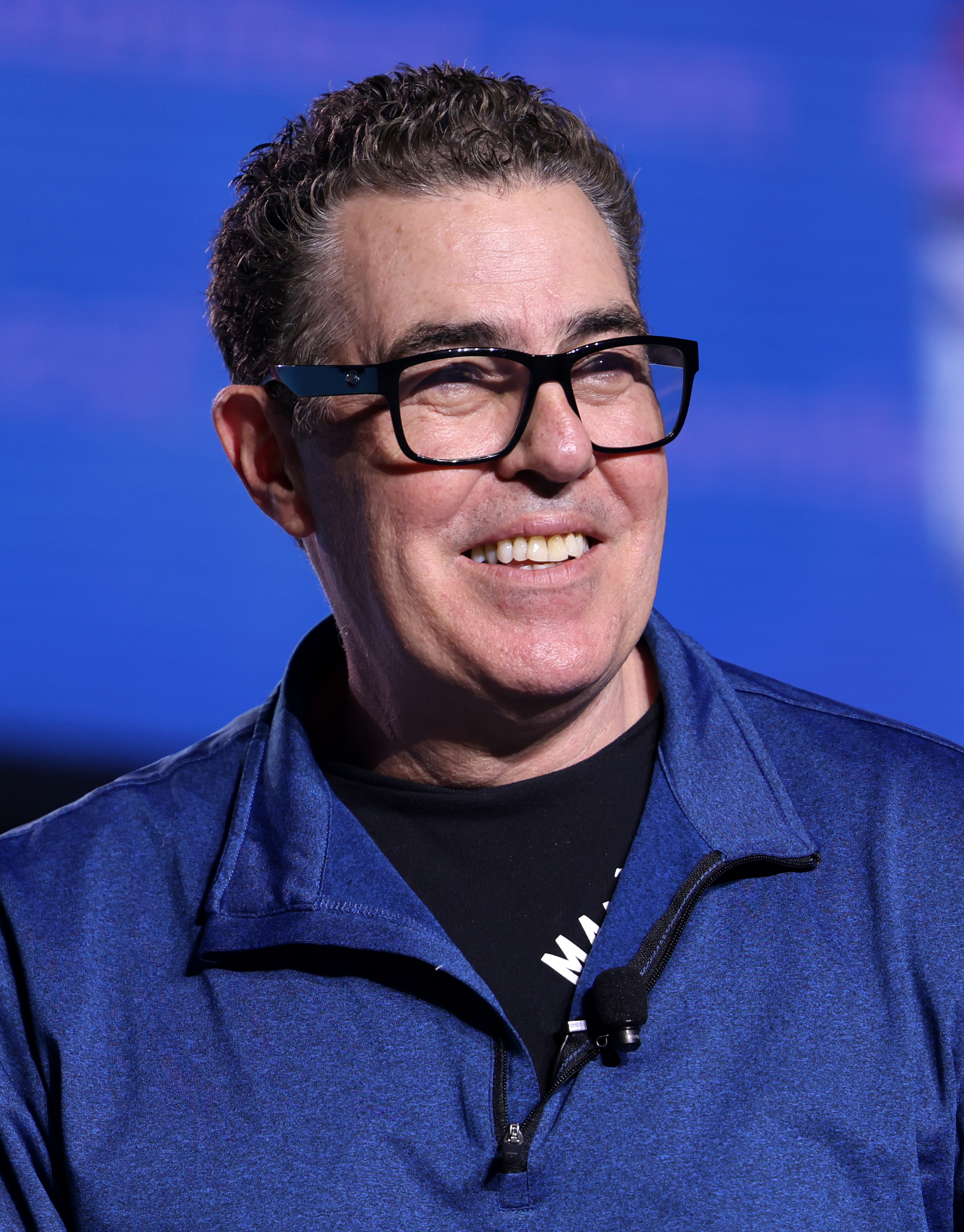
- Carolla in 2025
- Born: May 27, 1964 (age 62); Los Angeles, California, U.S.
- Occupations: Radio personality; television presenter; comedian; actor; author; podcaster
- Known for: Loveline (radio show); The Adam Carolla Show (podcast); The Adam Carolla Show (radio program)
- Television: Loveline; The Man Show; Crank Yankers; Too Late with Adam Carolla; The Adam Carolla Project; Catch a Contractor
- Board member of: Marijuana Policy Project (advisory board)
- Spouse: Lynette Paradise (m. 2002; div. 2021)
- Children: 2
- Website: adamcarolla.com

Adam Carolla (born May 27, 1964) is an American radio personality, comedian, actor and podcaster. He hosts The Adam Carolla Show, a talk show distributed as a podcast. He co-hosted the syndicated radio call-in program Loveline with Drew Pinsky from 1995 to 2005 as well as the show's television incarnation on MTV from 1996 to 2000. Carolla was the co-host and co-creator of the television program The Man Show (1999–2004), and the co-creator and a regular performer on the television show Crank Yankers (2002–2007, 2019–2022). He hosted The Adam Carolla Project, a home improvement television program which aired on TLC in 2005 and The Car Show on Speed in 2011.

Carolla has appeared on the network reality television programs Dancing with the Stars and The Celebrity Apprentice. His book In Fifty Years We'll All Be Chicks debuted on The New York Times Best Seller list in 2010, and his second book, Not Taco Bell Material, also reached The New York Times bestseller status. Carolla has made numerous guest appearances on political talk shows as a commentator. He hosted a weekly segment, "Rollin' with Carolla", on Bill O'Reilly's The O'Reilly Factor.

== Early life and education ==
Adam Carolla was born on May 27, 1964, to Jim and Kris (née McCall) Carolla. He said that he was born in a doctor's office in the Westwood neighborhood in the city of Los Angeles, although some sources list his birthplace as Philadelphia. He lived in the San Fernando Valley and his parents separated when he was young. He said on the Greg Gutfeld show on July 2, 2026 that his father was a substitute teacher in North Hollywood, Los Angeles. He was not given a middle name by his parents; on his driver's license application he listed his middle name as "Lakers" as a joke. The application was processed without notice. His maternal step-grandfather was screenwriter László Görög.

Adam Carolla grew up in the North Hollywood neighborhood of Los Angeles. He attended Colfax Elementary School, Walter Reed Junior High, and North Hollywood High School. Carolla did not receive his high school diploma until years later as it was held by the school until a library fine was paid. Carolla can be seen paying off the book and receiving his diploma in an episode of his 2005 television show, The Adam Carolla Project.

During his youth, Carolla played Pop Warner football for seven years; he later suggested that being involved in sports saved him from a chaotic home life. During his senior year at North Hollywood High School in North Hollywood, Carolla distinguished himself in football. In December 1981, he was named to the First Team Offensive Line, Central Valley League, one of 8 leagues at the time in the LA City Section of the California Interscholastic Federation. In October 2020 he spoke of being recruited by "7 or 8" schools including UC-Davis, Cal Poly Pomona, and Cal Poly San Luis Obispo. At different times, Carolla has given various explanations for why he did not play football in college, including a back injury, a failure to meet academic requirements, or being unable to complete required paperwork during the admissions process due to his parents' disinterest.

He began living on his own at the age of 18. He briefly attended Los Angeles Valley College, a community college, where he was placed on academic probation before dropping out to work in a series of jobs, including carpet cleaner, carpenter, boxing instructor, and traffic school instructor. Although broke, Carolla, his friends, and roommates owned a 1963 Cadillac limousine. In the early 1990s, Carolla studied improvisational comedy with The Groundlings and was a member of the ACME Comedy Theatre troupe.

== Radio ==
In 1994, Carolla volunteered his services as a boxing trainer to prepare Jimmy Kimmel for a bout being staged by KROQ-FM's morning radio program Kevin and Bean. Kimmel was a regular on the show as "Jimmy the Sports Guy" and he was set to fight another KROQ personality in a boxing exhibition which was being billed as the "Bleeda in Reseda". Carolla parlayed this opportunity into a long-running friendship and business partnership with Kimmel as well as a recurring role on Kevin and Bean as cranky woodshop teacher, Mr. Birchum.

=== Loveline ===
In October 1995, after being signed to the William Morris Agency by Mark Itkin, Carolla was offered the job of co-hosting the evening radio call-in show Loveline. His co-hosts were the physician Drew Pinsky ("Dr. Drew") and metal DJ Riki Rachtman. Carolla received the offer after Pinsky heard him on Kevin and Bean (Rachtman left the show the following year.) Loveline was broadcast on KROQ-FM in Los Angeles and was syndicated nationwide on the former Westwood One radio network.

While the format of the program was primarily that of a call-in show wherein listeners would ask questions about sex and relationships, Carolla would often spend much of the show ranting about various topics from fart jokes to extended parodies of radio morning shows, including mocking the format's penchant for useless and repetitive weather and traffic reports. In contrast to the reserved, thoughtful Pinsky, Carolla served as the loud, funny side of the show. Carolla's character was described by one reviewer as "a toned-down version of Howard Stern minus the huge ego". In a late-2003 Loveline episode, Carolla said that Hawaiians are "dumb", "in-bred", "retarded" people who are among the "dumbest people we have". The comments were met with anger in Hawaii and resulted in Loveline's cancellation on Hawaiian affiliate KPOI.

=== The Adam Carolla Show ===
In October 2005, Carolla was announced as the host of a new morning radio show on the Infinity Broadcasting network. His new show would replace the popular syndicated Howard Stern Show (which was moving to satellite radio) in twelve of the 27 markets in which Stern had been broadcast including Los Angeles, Las Vegas, San Francisco, San Diego, Phoenix, and Portland, Oregon. The Adam Carolla Show debuted in January 2006.

In early 2008, actor Gerard Butler sat in and observed Adam Carolla on The Adam Carolla Show in order to prepare for his role in The Ugly Truth as a cynical and crass talk-radio host allegedly based on Carolla. On February 18, 2009, The Adam Carolla Show was canceled as part of a format switch at KLSX to AMP FM, a new top 40 station. The final show was Friday, February 20, 2009.

== Podcasts ==
=== The Adam Carolla Podcast ===
Carolla began a daily podcast on February 23, 2009, at his personal website, which would evolve into the ACE Broadcasting Network. The first Adam Carolla podcast was downloaded more than 250,000 times in the initial 24 hours, and by the third podcast, it was the number one podcast on iTunes in both the U.S. and Canada. During the debut week, the Adam Carolla podcast recorded 1.6 million downloads. In the second week it recorded 2.4 million downloads. By the fourth episode of the second week, featuring former Adam Carolla Show sidekick Dave Dameshek, the show was downloaded more than 500,000 times. Adam said bandwidth cost more than $9,000 a month as of May 2009. At the end of 2009, The Adam Carolla Podcast was selected by iTunes for its end-of-the-year awards as the Best Audio Podcast of 2009.

On the April 4, 2010, episode of The Adam Carolla Show, Carolla referred to Filipino boxer Manny Pacquiao as a "fucking idiot" and said of the Philippines: "They got this and sex tours, that's all they have over there. Get your shit together, Philippines." A spokesman for President Gloria Macapagal Arroyo called Carolla an "ignorant fool". Carolla subsequently apologized via Twitter. On May 18, 2011, Carolla noted on Jimmy Kimmel Live! that The Adam Carolla Show had taken the Guinness World Record for the most downloaded podcast ever from previous holder Ricky Gervais by receiving 59,574,843 unique downloads from March 2009 to March 16, 2011.

In 2010, Carolla posed for the NOH8 Campaign. In August 2011, Carolla released a podcast where he mocked a petition to the producers of Sesame Street that demanded Bert and Ernie get married on air. He said on air that gay activists should "[j]ust get married, and please shut up" and that "Y.U.C.K." would be more memorable acronym than LGBT, and referring to transgender people he asked: "When did we start giving a shit about these people?" GLAAD characterized the previous remarks by Carolla as offensive, including an assertion that "all things being equal", heterosexual parents make better parents than homosexual parents. Carolla responded: "I'm sorry my comments were hurtful. I'm a comedian, not a politician."

==== "Patent Troll" Lawsuit ====
In 2013, Personal Audio filed a patent infringement lawsuit against Lotzi Digital, Inc., producers of The Adam Carolla Show and several other podcasts on the Carolla Digital Network, in the U.S. District Court for the Eastern District of Texas. The suit alleged that owner Adam Carolla and his network of content infringed on Personal Audio's patent 8,112,504. Using the crowdfunding site FundAnything.com, listeners contributed more than $475,000 (as of August 2014) to support Carolla throughout the legal proceedings.

Personal Audio dropped the lawsuit July 29, 2014, stating that the defendants were not "making significant money from infringing Personal Audio's patents". However, Carolla countersued, having already spent hundreds of thousands of dollars mounting a defense against claims he deemed unfounded. Among claims sought by the countersuit was a request that the initial patent be invalidated. On August 15, 2014, Carolla and Personal Audio filed a joint motion to dismiss after reaching a settlement, the details of which were not made public but included a six-week "quiet period" during which neither party could speak to the media. Both parties' claims were dropped without prejudice and, as such, could be refiled at a later date.

== Television ==
=== 1996–2004 ===
From 1996 to 2000, Carolla and Dr. Drew hosted Loveline on MTV, a television version of the radio show. Carolla and frequent collaborator Jimmy Kimmel created and co-hosted sketch comedy series The Man Show on Comedy Central from 1999 to 2003. The show was controversial due to its humor, with many critics accusing it of being sexist due to its portrayal of scantily clad women. He left The Man Show at the same time as Kimmel. Carolla has continued his work with Kimmel as a writer and guest on Jimmy Kimmel Live!. He also appeared on an episode of Space Ghost Coast to Coast around this time.

Carolla and partner Daniel Kellison own Jackhole Productions. The two created the television show Crank Yankers for Comedy Central, which revived the Mr. Birchum character. The show premiered in 2002 on Comedy Central and returned to MTV2 on February 9, 2007, running again until March 30, 2007. The show screened in Australia on SBS Television and The Comedy Channel between 2003 and 2008. The show was again revived in 2019, returning to Comedy Central. Corolla also starred in the role of Spanky Ham for the Comedy Central adult animated series, Drawn Together.

=== 2005–2008 ===
From August to November 2005, Carolla hosted the talk show Too Late with Adam Carolla on Comedy Central. In 2005, he was featured in a home remodeling program called The Adam Carolla Project wherein he and a crew of old friends renovated his childhood home. The 13 episodes aired on the cable channel TLC (The Learning Channel) from October through December 2005. The house was then sold for 1.2 million dollars.

In 2006, Carolla appeared on the special summer series Gameshow Marathon as a celebrity panelist on the Match Game episode. On the February 18, 2008, broadcast of his radio show, he announced that he would be one of the contestants on the next season of Dancing with the Stars. Later in the broadcast, it was revealed to Carolla that his partner would be Julianne Hough. He was voted off on the April 8, 2008, episode after his performance of the Paso Doble, after incorporating a demonstration of unicycle riding in his dance routine.

Dancing with the Stars performances

| Week # | Dance/Song | Judges' score | | | Result |
| Week # | Dance/Song | Inaba | Goodman | Tonioli | Result |
| 1 | Foxtrot/ "Mellow Yellow" | 5 | 5 | 5 | N/A |
| 2 | Mambo/ "House of Bamboo" | 6 | 7 | 6 | Safe |
| 3 | Tango/ "I Can't Tell a Waltz from a Tango" | 7 | 7 | 7 | Safe |
| 4 | Paso Doble/ "Plaza of Execution" | 6 | 7 | 6 | Eliminated |

On June 16, 2008, Carolla was selected to host a pilot of an American version of the popular BBC show Top Gear for NBC. In December 2008, NBC decided not to pick up the show.

=== 2009–present ===
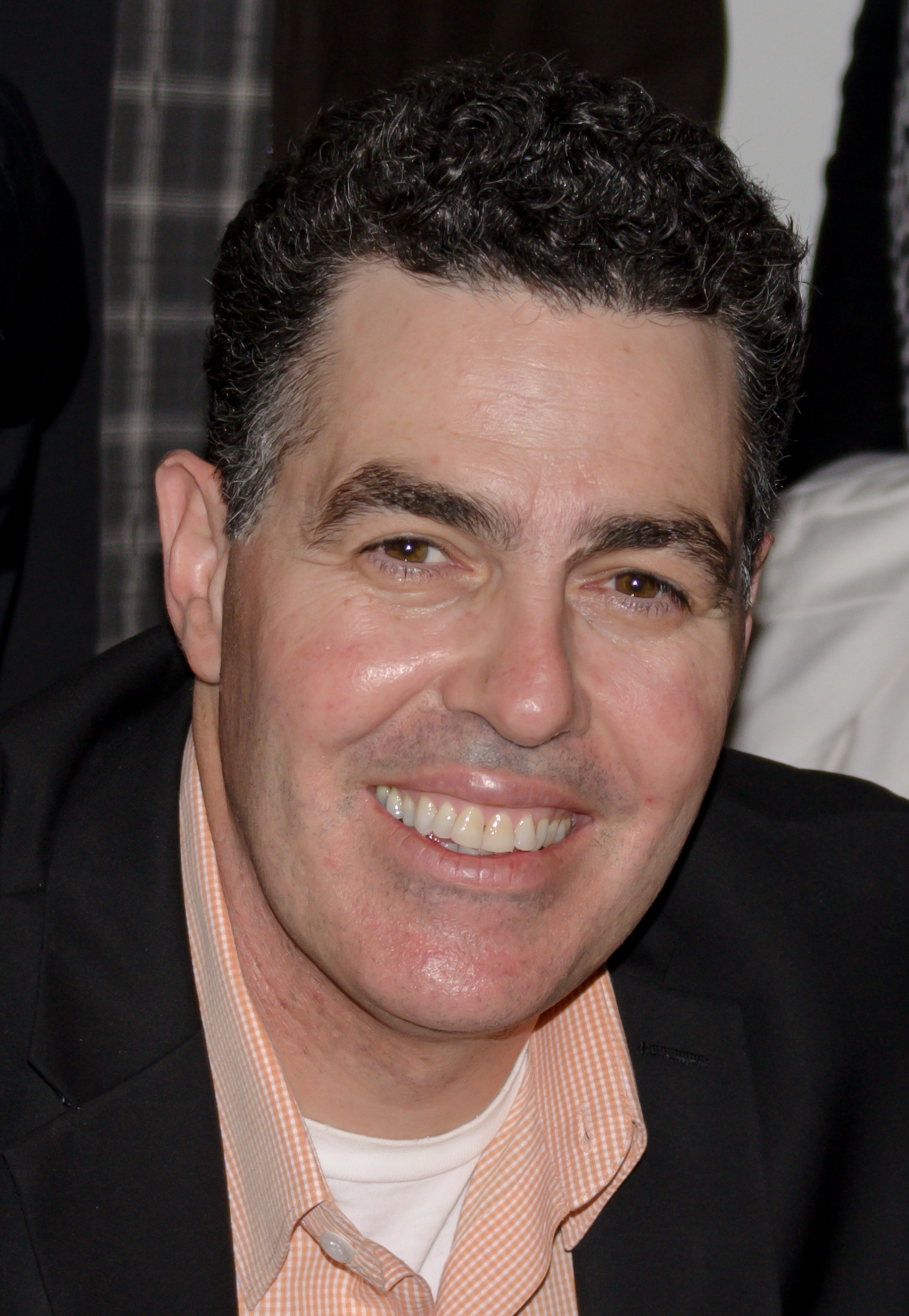
Carolla in Redondo Beach, California, February 2012

On February 21, 2009, a day after his Los Angeles-based morning radio show was canceled – as part of a format change at KLSX-FM – CBS ordered a comedy pilot, Ace in the Hole, starring Carolla as a husband and father who works as a driving instructor. Carolla created and wrote the pilot with Kevin Hench (Jimmy Kimmel Live!). Carolla stated that Pamela Adlon was to play his wife and Windell Middlebrooks would play his best friend. During his March 30, 2009 podcast, Carolla briefly described the show as being "All in the Family, essentially", with Carolla playing a similar role to that of Archie Bunker. On the July 23, 2009, episode of the Adam Carolla Podcast, Carolla announced that CBS was not picking up the pilot for the 2009 season, "in any way, shape or form".

On October 22, 2009, it was reported in Variety that Carolla had struck a deal with NBC to produce a half-hour pilot for a sitcom. The report was later confirmed on January 4, 2010, and was the first comedy pilot ordered by NBC for the season. The untitled project, written by Carolla and Kevin Hench, was a single-camera sitcom that starred Carolla as a contractor and father who attempts to rebuild his life after his wife leaves him. Carolla was set to executive produce the NBC project along with frequent collaborators Kimmel and Hench, as well as his agent James "Babydoll" Dixon, Jon Pollack, Gail Berman, Daniel Kellison, and Lloyd Braun. Universal Media Studios, BermanBraun, and Carolla and Jimmy Kimmel's own Jackhole Industries.

On the February 13, 2010, episode of Carolla's CarCast podcast, he revealed that The History Channel had picked up Top Gear US, which NBC had decided against in 2008. On the March 26, 2010, episode of CarCast, Carolla said that he would not be co-hosting Top Gear US because of scheduling conflicts with his NBC sitcom project. In June 2010, Carolla said that his NBC pilot had not been picked up and was now "dead".

Premiering on February 19, 2012, Carolla was also one of the contestants in the 12th season of NBC's The Celebrity Apprentice. He was fired in Week 4, because host Donald Trump perceived that Carolla did not utilize teammate Mario Andretti's car background during a Buick presentation. In 2022, Carolla competed in season eight of The Masked Singer as "Avocado". He was eliminated on "Comedy Roast Night" alongside Chris Jericho as "Bride".

==== The Car Show ====
Carolla's The Car Show debuted on Speed TV July 13, 2011. Appearing Wednesdays at 10 pm Eastern, it featured Carolla as the host, along with Dan Neil, John Salley, and Matt Farah. It had a format similar to Top Gear, mixing car reviews, tests and humor. The show was initially met with positive reviews from car enthusiasts and comedy fans. Talk show host and comedian Jay Leno called The Car Show, "a lot of fun". The Car Show was canceled after one season, after undergoing format changes due to low ratings, as Carolla mentioned on his podcast on January 13, 2012.

==== Catch a Contractor ====
Catch a Contractor is a non-scripted, original series on Spike, hosted by Carolla along with "no-nonsense contractor" Skip Bedell and his wife, investigator Alison Bedell. Together they expose unethical contractors and seek retribution for wronged homeowners. The show premiered on March 9, 2014, to 1.2 million viewers, the largest audience for a series debut on Spike since Coal in March 2011. The show was cancelled in 2015.

==== Adam Carolla and Friends Build Stuff Live ====
Premiering on Spike TV on March 14, 2017, Adam Carolla and Friends Build Stuff Live features Carolla building projects live and in studio with some of his Hollywood friends, and tackling viewers' home improvement projects via social media.

=== Voice acting ===
Carolla has also done voice acting in animation, including Commander Nebula on the Disney animated series Buzz Lightyear of Star Command, Death on Family Guy (replacing Norm Macdonald) and Spanky Ham on Drawn Together. He was also the voice of the éclair police officer, Wynchell, in the Disney film Wreck-It Ralph. In 2008 and 2009, he was the spokesperson for T.G.I. Friday's.

== Film ==
In 2003, he appeared in Windy City Heat as himself. In 2006, Carolla finished work on The Hammer, a semi-autobiographical independent film he co-wrote and co-produced, in which he stars opposite Heather Juergensen. The film is based loosely on his own life and is filmed at a gym he helped build with his co-star, Ozzie, played by Oswaldo Castillo, his friend in real life whom he met while building the gym when they both worked in construction. The film made its world premiere at the 2007 Tribeca Film Festival and shortly thereafter received a positive review in Variety. The film was released on March 21, 2008. The film is rated 80% on Rotten Tomatoes.

Carolla made a short appearance in Jeff Balis' Still Waiting... (a sequel to Waiting...) playing a pick-up artist guru. Carolla helped write an unproduced screenplay for a film entitled Deaf Frat Guy: Showdown at Havasu. He is the voice of Virgil in the independent short film Save Virgil.

In July 2013, Carolla used crowdfunding for Road Hard; a film he directed and starred in, about the lives of aging road comics. Carolla confirmed through a press conference that the film would co-star David Alan Grier, Illeana Douglas, Diane Farr, and Larry Miller. It had limited theatrical release in the United States. Several minutes of the credits are devoted to listing the names of those who helped crowdfund the film. Carolla also directed the documentary Winning: The Racing Life of Paul Newman on the 35-year car racing career of Paul Newman. The documentary showcases Newman's racing life as both a prolific driver and owner.

In 2016, Carolla and Nate Adams produced and directed The 24 Hour War, a documentary about the rivalry of Henry Ford II and Enzo Ferrari at the 24 Hours of Le Mans races during the 1960s. In 2017, Carolla and Dennis Prager began filming No Safe Spaces, a documentary about political correctness at universities. No Safe Spaces had a limited opening on October 25, 2019, and did well enough to open nationwide on December 6, 2019.

== Books ==
Carolla and Drew Pinsky co-wrote (with Marshall Fine) the self-help book The Dr. Drew and Adam Book: A Survival Guide to Life and Love, published in 1998. The book is a compilation of some of the advice the pair compiled while producing Loveline. In November 2010, Carolla's In Fifty Years We'll All Be Chicks... And Other Complaints from an Angry Middle-Aged White Guy was published by Crown Archetype and debuted at number eight on The New York Times Best Seller list for hardcover non-fiction on November 21, 2010. The book was compiled from rants Carolla had delivered on his radio show and podcast along with some new material and was dictated to and ghost-written by Mike Lynch. Carolla published a short, illustrated e-book entitled Rich Man, Poor Man in January 2012. The book details some similarities in the experiences of the very rich and the very poor which are not shared by the middle class. The book was illustrated by Michael Narren. Carolla's book Not Taco Bell Material was published by Crown Archetype on June 12, 2012.

In President Me: The America That's in My Head, Carolla presents the comedian's fantasy of the United States with him at the helm. When asked in separate interviews, both before and after the book's release, about whether the "if-I-were-king" critique of America was a serious piece, he said it's both: "Well, there's a lot of jokes in it, but you know, it's like... Well, if you have a fat friend you may make a lot of fat jokes about your fat friend, but he's still fat".

In Daddy, Stop Talking!: And Other Things My Kids Want But Won't Be Getting, Carolla writes about modern parenting. He talks about what he believes adults must do if they don't want to have to support their kids forever. He uses his own childhood as a cautionary tale, and decries helicopter parenting. Carolla's book, I'm Your Emotional Support Animal: Navigating Our All Woke, No Joke Culture, was published by Post Hill Press on June 16, 2020. His latest book, Everything Reminds Me of Something, was published by Post Hill Press on July 19, 2022.

== Views ==
=== Religious ===
Carolla was raised in a Westernized form of Buddhism by his parents, which he continued to practice for the sake of a girlfriend until age 21. He has discussed being familiar with Judaism, due to a close relationship with his grandmother's Hungarian Jewish second husband, although Carolla himself is not Jewish. Since beginning his media career, he has consistently identified as an atheist.

=== Political ===
Regarding his political views, Carolla said, "I guess I would be Republican, in the sense that I want a secure border, I'm not into the welfare state, I'm not into all those freebie lunch programs. It just kind of demeans people." He goes on to state, however, that he is also in favor of typically liberal causes such as the legalization of marijuana (he is a member of the advisory board of the Marijuana Policy Project) and support for some progressive causes such as "[being] against automatic weapons. I'm not an NRA guy by any stretch of the imagination. I'd like alternative energy to be explored and electric cars to be used, but I want them to be powered by nuclear power plants." Elsewhere, he has stated, "My feeling is this whole country is founded on the principle of 'If you are not hurting anyone, and you're not fucking with someone else's shit, and you are paying your taxes, you should be able to just do what you want to do.' It's the freedom and the independence." In an interview with Reason TV, Carolla described his views as libertarian. Carolla expressed his support for Andrew Yang's 2020 presidential run. In January 2026 it was announced that Carolla has agreed to appear at the recently renamed Donald Trump and John F. Kennedy Memorial Center for the Arts after many other performers canceled their appearances at this venue due to the addition of Trump's name to the facility.

=== Women and comedy ===
In June 2012, Carolla gave a printed interview to the New York Post, where among other things he said "chicks" are "always the least funny on the writing staff" and "dudes are funnier than chicks". His comments were criticized as sexist. He criticized coverage of his comments as over-simplistic and misleading.

=== Cancel culture ===
Carolla said, "If you meet anyone over 45, they'll tell you they got paddled, they got swatted, the teacher would smack them with a ruler... Paddling a kid sounds pretty outrageous in 2020 and nobody would stand for it. ... But the people who engaged in it at the time when it was common practice or had a context, we don't need to build a time machine so we can cancel-culture them". In an interview with Tucker Carlson, Carolla said that cancel culture is "destroying free speech and killing comedy."

== Personal life ==
On September 28, 2002, Carolla and Lynette Paradise married. Their twins Natalia and Santino "Sonny" Richard Carolla were born on June 7, 2006. Carolla announced in May 2021 that he and Lynette were divorcing after 19 years. He lives in La Cañada Flintridge, California. Carolla was a part owner of Amalfi, an Italian restaurant in Los Angeles and said, "I own about two percent of it, but I've never seen a penny."

Carolla won the 2013 Pro/Celebrity Race as a professional and the 2012 Pro/Celebrity Race at the Grand Prix of Long Beach as an amateur. The 2012 race was run on April 14, 2012, and was broadcast on Speed TV. Carolla has previously participated in the race in 2010 and 2003. He finished ninth among 19 racers (fifth among the ten celebrities) in 2010 despite being regarded as a pre-race favorite. He is also a serious automobile collector with over 20 cars. His collection includes several Lamborghinis from the 1960s and early 1970s, including two Miuras (of 764 examples ever produced), one of which he has loaned to the Petersen Automotive Museum in Los Angeles, two 400GT 2+2s (of 247 units produced) and a 1965 350GT (one of 135 built). At least one Ferrari, an Aston Martin, and several vintage race cars round out the collection. In 2024, Carolla and his car collection were featured on an episode of Pawn Stars, in which he initially intended to sell a British 1972 Ford Escort race car owned and driven by Paul Newman to show host Rick Harrison for $250,000, but changed his mind after learning that the car was valued at up to $300,000.

== Honors ==
Carolla and Drew Pinsky received a Sexual Health in Entertainment (SHINE) Award from The Media Project in 2000 for "incorporating accurate and honest portrayals of sexuality" in the talk show category for Loveline. Asteroid (4535) Adamcarolla is named in his honor.

On May 27, 2026, being financially sponsored by his personal friends David and Danielle Casarotto, Carolla received a star on the Hollywood Walk of Fame for radio broadcasting.

== Filmography ==
| Year | Title | Role | Notes |
|---|---|---|---|
| 1998 | Too Smooth | Bruce Greenberg | |
| 1998 | Art House | Cool Guy | |
| 1999 | Splendor | Mike's Stupid Boss | as Adam Carola |
| 1999–2004 | The Man Show | Writer / Director | |
| 2000 | Down to You | 'The Man Show' Host | |
| 2000–2001 | Buzz Lightyear of Star Command | Commander Nebula | Voice |
| 2000–2014 | Family Guy | Death | Voice |
| 2001 | Jay and Silent Bob Strike Back | FBI Agent Sid | Deleted scene |
| 2002 | MADtv | Phil Pendergrast | Episode #7.16 |
| 2002 | Frank McKlusky, C.I. | Detective | |
| 2002 | Son of the Beach | The Host | Episode "Penetration Island" |
| 2002–2022 | Crank Yankers | Writer / Executive Producer / Dick Birchum / Himself | |
| 2003 | Gerhard Reinke's Wanderlust | Executive Producer | TV miniseries |
| 2003 | Windy City Heat | Executive Producer | Documentary |
| 2003 | Jimmy Kimmel Live! | Writer | |
| 2004 | Bar Mitzvah Bash! | Consulting Producer | TV special |
| 2004 | Save Virgil | Virgil | Voice, short |
| 2004–2007 | Drawn Together | Spanky Ham | Voice |
| 2005 | Too Late with Adam Carolla | | |
| 2005 | The Adam Carolla Project | Executive Producer | |
| 2005 | The Bernie Mac Show | Himself | Episode: "Marathon Mac" |
| 2005–2006 | The Andy Milonakis Show | Executive Producer | |
| 2006 | Wasted | Nick Morgan | |
| 2007 | The Hammer | Writer / Executive Producer / Jerry Ferro | |
| 2007 | Head, Heart and Balls... or Why I Gave Up Smoking Pot | Anxiety | Short |
| 2008 | The Sarah Silverman Program | Carl | Episode: "Pee" |
| 2008 | Wizards of Waverly Place | Burt the Cab | Voice, episode: "Taxi Dance" |
| 2009 | Alligator Boots | Executive Producer | |
| 2009 | Ace in the Hole | Writer / Executive Producer / "Ace" Morella | Television film |
| 2009 | Still Waiting... | Ken Halsband | |
| 2009 | The Goode Family | | |
| 2010 | The Drawn Together Movie: The Movie! | Spanky Ham | Voice |
| 2010 | Cubed | Himself | Episode #1.31 |
| 2010 | Kick Buttowski: Suburban Daredevil | One-Eyed Jackson | Voice |
| 2010 | Federal Bureau of Manners: The Nod | | |
| 2011 | Sports Show with Norm Macdonald | Executive Producer | |
| 2011 | The Birchums | Producer / Director | Television film |
| 2011 | Division III: Football's Finest | Chet Ryback | |
| 2012 | Wreck-It Ralph | Wynnchel | Voice |
| 2014 | Bar Rescue | Himself | Episode: "Scoreboard to Death" |
| 2014–2015 | Catch a Contractor | Executive Producer | |
| 2015 | Road Hard | Producer / Director / Bruce Madsen | |
| 2015 | Winning: The Racing Life of Paul Newman | Producer / Director | Documentary |
| 2016 | The 24 Hour War | Producer / Director | Documentary |
| 2016–2018 | Going Racing with Adam Carolla | Executive Producer | |
| 2017 | Adam Carolla and Friends Build Stuff Live | Writer / Executive Producer | |
| 2018 | 90th Academy Awards | Writer | TV special |
| 2018 | Adam Carolla: Not Taco Bell Material | Writer / Producer | Documentary |
| 2018 | Ralph Breaks the Internet | Wynnchel | Voice |
| 2019 | No Safe Spaces | | Documentary |
| 2019 | Shelby American: The Carroll Shelby Story | Producer / Director | Documentary |
| 2020 | Uppity: The Willy T. Ribbs Story | Producer / Director | Documentary |
| 2021 | Valentine's Day in Hell | The Devil | |
| 2021 | Prom in Hell | | |
| 2022 | The Masked Singer | Himself/Avocado | Season 8 contestant |
| 2024 | Mr. Birchum | Mister Birchum | Animated series |
| 2024 | Pawn Stars | Himself | Episode: "Choose Your Wea-pawn" |
