= The Man Show =

American comedy television show

- Genre: Sketch comedy; Satire
- Created by: Adam Carolla; Jimmy Kimmel; Daniel Kellison
- Directed by: Dennis Rosenblatt
- Starring: Adam Carolla; Jimmy Kimmel; Joe Rogan; Doug Stanhope; Bill Foster; Aaron Hamill
- Country of origin: United States
- Original language: English
- No. of seasons: 6
- No. of episodes: 117 (list of episodes)

Production
- Executive producers: Jennifer Heftler, Lisa Page, Daniel Kellison
- Running time: 22 minutes
- Production companies: Jackhole Industries (seasons 1-5); Stone Stanley Entertainment; Comedy Central

Original release
- Network: Comedy Central
- Release: June 15, 1999 – June 19, 2004

Related
- Jimmy Kimmel Live! Too Late with Adam Carolla

The Man Show is an American sketch comedy television show on Comedy Central that aired from 1999 to 2004. It was created by its two original co-hosts, Adam Carolla and Jimmy Kimmel, and their executive producer Daniel Kellison. The pilot was originally paid for and pitched to ABC, which declined to pick up the show.

The Man Show simultaneously celebrated and lampooned the stereotypical loutish male perspective in a sexually charged, humorous light. The show consisted of a variety of recorded comedy sketches and live in-studio events, usually requiring audience participation. The Man Show was a career breakthrough for Kimmel.

The Man Show is particularly well known for its buxom female models, the Juggy Dance Squad, who would dance in themed, revealing costumes at the opening of every show, in the aisles of the audience just before The Man Show went to commercial break, and during the end segment "Girls on Trampolines".

The first year of The Man Show featured beer-guzzling entertainer Bill "the Fox" Foster as the show's emcee. Foster specialized in chugging two beers in record time (sometimes while suspended upside down) and singing lewd drinking songs. He closed every episode by leading the audience in the German drinking toast Zicke, Zacke, Zicke, Zacke, Hoi, Hoi, Hoi!, a tradition that the show continued after his death from prostate cancer in 2000.

== Episodes ==
Season	Episodes	Originally released	
Season	Episodes	First released	Last released
1	22	June 16, 1999	January 26, 2000
2	26	June 18, 2000	March 25, 2001
3	26	July 1, 2001	March 3, 2002
4	21	August 11, 2002	May 11, 2003
5	11	August 17, 2003	November 2, 2003
6	11	May 2, 2004	June 19, 2004

== Departure of Kimmel and Carolla ==
In 2003, Kimmel and Carolla left The Man Show, with the hosting jobs passed down to comedians Joe Rogan and Doug Stanhope. With the hosting change came a recomposition of the show's theme song. The new pair hosted the show for two more seasons before it ceased production in 2004, after its final episode aired on June 19.

== Post-series ==
Kimmel went on to host his own late-night show for ABC, Jimmy Kimmel Live!, which he has hosted since 2003. Carolla stayed with Comedy Central to host Too Late with Adam Carolla in 2005 and then became part of CBS Radio's Free FM experiment after Howard Stern joined Sirius Satellite Radio; his talk show, The Adam Carolla Show, ran until 2009. Carolla continues to do the show as a daily podcast and also co-hosted the Spike show Catch a Contractor. Carolla has appeared on Kimmel's program several times (more so than any other guest) during its run.

Rogan continued to host Fear Factor for three more years after The Man Show was cancelled and eventually became color commentator for the Ultimate Fighting Championship, with which he has been associated since its early days. He also continues to tour as a standup comedian and hosts The Joe Rogan Experience podcast, which he launched in 2009.

In October 2017, several clips from the series began to resurface, including clips of Kimmel's impersonations in blackface of Karl Malone. Kimmel did not issue an apology until June 2020, in the wake of the George Floyd protests. "There is nothing more important to me than your respect, and I apologize to those who were genuinely hurt or offended by the makeup I wore or the words I spoke," Kimmel said in a statement, adding that he never realized that it could be viewed as more than "an imitation of a human being."

== Notable Juggy Girls ==
- Christy Hemme – American professional wrestler and WWE Diva
- Joanna Krupa
- Candice Michelle – American professional wrestler and WWE Diva
- Nicole Pulliam
