= Daniel Kellison =

American film producer

- Born: June 28, 1964 (age 61); New York City, New York, U.S.
- Occupations: Television and film producer
- Notable work: Late Night with David Letterman; Late Show with David Letterman

Daniel Kellison (born June 28, 1964) is an American television and film producer and co-founder of Jackhole Productions, an entertainment group formed with partners Jimmy Kimmel and Adam Carolla.

Kellison was a producer for Late Night with David Letterman and Late Show with David Letterman for eight years. Kellison also executive produced and co-created ABC's David Blaine: The Magic Man, Comedy Central's The Man Show, Crank Yankers and was the original executive producer for The Rosie O'Donnell Show.

During his stint as a producer at the Late Show with David Letterman, he persuaded Drew Barrymore to flash Letterman her breasts. He also convinced Madonna to appear on the program with the premise she would confront the host over his jokes about her personal life. The segment became controversial, with the singer repeatedly using foul language and refusing to leave the stage when her interview was to end.

In March 2013, Kellison launched the YouTube channel Jash with partners Sarah Silverman, Michael Cera, Tim & Eric and Reggie Watts as well as the Video Podcasting Network (featuring Video Podcasts from Adam Carolla, The Earwolf Network, Norm Macdonald and Doug Benson).

He also served as Executive Producer on several award-winning short films produced under the Jash banner. These shorts include "Catherine" (starring Jenny Slate), Michael Cera's "Brazzaville Teen-ager" and "Gregory Go Boom", which won the 2014 Jury Award in U.S. fiction at the Sundance Film Festival.

Kellison was a contributor to ESPN's Grantland.
