= Kevin Hart's Guide to Black History =

- Written by: Brian Volk-Weiss; Evan Waite
- Directed by: Tom Stern
- Starring: Kevin Hart
- Country of origin: United States

Production
- Running time: 62 minutes

Original release
- Network: Netflix
- Release: February 8, 2019

Kevin Hart's Guide to Black History is a Netflix variety special starring Kevin Hart.

== Premise ==
Kevin Hart's Guide to Black History is a guide to African-American black history through re-enactments with a familial sitcom set-up and archival footage.

== Cast ==
- Kevin Hart as Himself
- Steve Agee as President Grant / Lou Cypher / Drunk Dave
- Derek Basco as Ootah (Eskimo Guide)
- Brad Berryhill as Confederate Sentry / Medic
- Kirk Bovill as Confederate Sentry
- Jeff Bowser as Captain William Postell
- Barry Brewer as Matthew Henson
- James Callis as President Lincoln / Confederate Captain
- Al Shearer as Robert Smalls
- Lonnie Chavis as Robert Smalls' Son
- Brandi Conley as Swooning Bombshell Woman
- Justin Dray as Union Captain
- Nathaniel Edwards as Charles de Gaulle
- John Ennis as Postal Worker 1 / Audience Member 1
- Philip Friedman as Patient
- Josh Gardner as Confederate Sailor
- Greg Germann as Dr. Blalock
- Tiffany Haddish as Mae Jemison
- Lil Rel Howery as Himself / Henry "Box" Brown
- Gerald "Slink" Johnson as William Tillman
- Tom Kenny as Robert Peary
- Alphonso McAuley as Vivien Thomas
- Alanah McClanahan as young Mae Jemison
- Nika Williams as Josephine Baker
- "Weird Al" Yankovic as Jeremy's dad

== Release ==
It was released on February 8, 2019 on Netflix streaming.
