= Saul of the Mole Men =

- Genre: Comedy
- Created by: Craig Lewis
- Developed by: Peter Girardi; Craig Lewis; Tom Stern
- Directed by: Tom Stern
- Starring: Josh Gardner; Hugh Davidson; Irina Voronina; Arturo Gil
- Voices of: Frank Potenza; Jeff Bennett; Dana Snyder; Gary Anthony Williams; Carlos Alazraqui; Grey DeLisle
- Narrated by: Jeff Bennett
- Theme music composer: Tim Burns
- Opening theme: "Saul of the Mole Men", lyrics by Craig Lewis, performed by Trey Parker
- Ending theme: "Saul of the Mole Men" (Instrumental)
- Composers: Tim Burns; Lou Fagenson
- Country of origin: United States
- Original language: English
- No. of episodes: 20 (& 1 unaired Pilot)

Production
- Executive producers: Craig Lewis; Peter Girardi; Tom Stern (Series only)
- Producers: Sandi Yi; Jennifer Dugan (Episodes 11–20)
- Cinematography: Alex Poppas
- Editors: Dave Mendel; Jeremy Reuben (Series only)
- Running time: 11 minutes
- Production companies: Funny Garbage; Williams Street

Original release
- Network: Adult Swim
- Release: February 11 – July 15, 2007

Related
- Young Person's Guide to History

Saul of the Mole Men is an American live-action/puppet/animated hybrid comedy television series created by Craig Lewis, former writer on Cartoon Network's The Grim Adventures of Billy & Mandy and Foster's Home for Imaginary Friends, and developed by Lewis, director Tom Stern and artist Peter Girardi. The series first aired on the channel's late night Adult Swim programming block on February 11, 2007. Described as "an ultra-patriotic Land of the Lost set in the center of the Earth", the series was directed by Tom Stern and stars Josh Gardner, who previously collaborated with Stern and Girardi on the television series Gerhard Reinke's Wanderlust. Some elements, such as the use of Mole Men antagonists and the use of a giant drill for an underground excavation, also bore resemblance to the 1951 Superman film with a similar title, Superman and the Mole Men. Its theme song is performed by South Park co-creator Trey Parker.

Lewis' primary inspirations behind this homage to 1970s-era Saturday morning live-action television were Sid and Marty Krofft (Land of the Lost), Doctor Who (Tom Baker-era), and the Planet of the Apes franchise. On October 31, 2008, Adult Swim ran a special Halloween marathon consisting only of cancelled shows, featuring Saul of the Mole Men, thus confirming its cancellation.

== Plot ==
A series promo featured brief introductions for the crew on the use of a subterranean drill module. The team, known as STRATA, included Captain Jim J. James, Lieutenant Jen E. James, Robot, Kiko the Mute Wildboy, and the "rest" of the STRATA action team, which included Saul Malone (Gardner) – and Don Rogers. The main character, Saul, is seen in the background or blocked off by objects like a shovel or a flag during the promo.

Following the promo, the crew is shown aboard STRATA's huge ship, which is burrowing deep under Earth's surface. Saul becomes the sole survivor of the main team when rocks begin pummeling the rest of the STRATA team, and crippling their ship; the only other survivors are a Robot controlled by a human brain, and the vapid pop musician Johnny Tambourine, who is conscious but trapped in a hibernation capsule. Saul soon finds himself in an underground world populated by "Mole Men" and "Bird Bats" as well as unexplained characters like "The Floating Pancake" and "Chinacula", a cape-wearing Chinese vampire. Though cut off from the surface world, Saul is elated, believing he will find evidence beneath the surface for his theory that there are sentient rocks descended from a huge "mother rock". Terrified by the Mole Men, Saul impulsively impales their king using the STRATA transmitter. The king eventually dies, touching off a power struggle between his two sons – the older (but corpulent and corrupt) Bertrum Burrows, and the noble Clancy Burrows. Saul fails to get a proper signal to STRATA before the transmitter is destroyed. However, he does meet a talking rock, one he believes to be the Mother Rock. The intelligent stone inspires Saul to lead the Mole Men, who themselves are turning to a popular vote in search of a new king. Saul is easily defeated by both of the Burrows brothers, who themselves lose to a clueless Johnny Tambourine.

As the series progresses, Saul is alternately challenged and befriended by Mole Men. Saul meets Fallopia, a female and one of the most horribly mutated of the Mole Men (when revealed, she actually appears to be a beautiful human woman). Though Fallopia becomes Saul's love interest, she betrays him when found in flagrante delicto with Johnny Tambourine. Eventually the plot links the Mother Rock, a war between mole men and bird bats and a prophecy involving magical gemstones, the end of the world and Benjamin Franklin.

In the season 1 finale, Saul, Clancy, and Stromulus Guandor team up to defeat the Rock Assassins, which are actually Jim J. James and Jen. E. James' bodies with rock heads, who then combine to form a giant rock monster. With the combined talents of Stromulus' "Sonar of the Bird-Bats", Bertrum's"Mole Man Burrowing", and Saul's "Rock Master Tumble", they defeat the rock monster, and Saul's old captains die in peace — only for Saul to confront Nathaniel Baltimore — his arch rival from the Tallahassee Geological License Review Board — who inexplicably appears. Suddenly, they find a spaceship, and everybody, including the floating pancake, clambers on. Clancy even allows Bertrum aboard, though how he survived the rock attack in the previous episode is never explained. Before they take off, Otnip – the moss-covered devil of the Mole Men – stops their ship. Clancy goes out in an apparent suicide mission to blow up Otnip and free the ship. The episode ends as the ship flies into outer space, and the team, led by Saul and Fallopia, with Bertrum, Stromulus, Mrs. Burrows, Li'l Burrows, Nathaniel Baltimore, the floating pancake, and Chinacula is renamed "Strata-Team Space". Thus ends the season.

Advertisements began airing on Adult Swim advertising the show as STRATA instead of the original title, making the series appear much like Electric Shock!! Strada 5 (電撃!! ストラダ5, Dengeki!! Sutorada Faibu). Subsequent advertisements, however, focus more on Saul and reveal the actual title of the show.

Saul often referred to his home-town of Buffalo, New Yorkk and revealed that he studied geology. Saul's presence is largely funny because of his endearing use of Buffalo English. His love interest is introduced as a creature perceived by locals as hideous and nearly beaten to death by the Mole Men. The beating is interrupted and the creature is revealed to be the lovely Fallopia. The Mole Men's perception of Fallopia's appearance is not unlike the Twilight Zone episode "Eye of the Beholder".

== Cast ==
- Josh Gardner as Saul Malone and Johnny Tambourine
- Frank Potenza as Robot (voice)
- Hugh Davidson as Bertrum Burrows (voice), Otnip
- Jeff Bennett as Clancy Burrows (voice)
- Jonah Ray as Clancy Burrows (body)
- Irina Voronina as Fallopia
- Dana Snyder as STRATA Operator #1
- Gary Anthony Williams as STRATA Operator #2
- Arturo Gil as Lil' Lil Burrows
- Carlos Alazraqui as Stromulus Guandor the Birdbat Leader (voice)
- Grey DeLisle as Mother Rock (voice)

== Episodes ==
=== Pilot ===
A pilot episode for Saul of the Mole Men was produced in 2005 and it was never aired on television. The pilot was released on Adultswim.com, but it has been taken down since.

Title	Directed by	Written by	Original release date
"Where the Red Menace Grows"	Tom Stern	Craig Lewis	Unaired
Saul finds himself at the center of the earth among mole-men and puking birds, and discovers his crew members, Johnny Tambourine and Robot, haven't died.

=== Season 1 (2007) ===
No.	Title	Directed by	Written by	Original release date	Prod. code
1	"A New Friend"	Tom Stern	Craig Lewis	February 11, 2007	101
The STRATA team, formed to drill to the center of the Earth, runs into trouble on the way and is almost entirely killed by a rock fall. A few survivors are left somewhere deep below – Saul Malone (a geologist), Johnny Tambourine (an early-60s-style rock star), and Robot (a grumpy robot). Saul soon discovers that the caves are inhabited by hairy 'mole men'. Saul looks for an antenna to make contact with headquarters. The king of the mole men finds it and offers it to Saul in a friendly fashion, but Saul panics and stabs the king in the head with the antenna.
2	"Blood Is Thicker Than Walter"	Tom Stern	Craig Lewis	February 18, 2007	102
Saul, having stabbed the king of the Mole Men through the head with the STRATA communication antenna, tries to contact STRATA. Bertrum, one of the sons of the king, plots to kill the king so that he can seize the throne. Saul attempts to kill a moleman and hollow out his body to be worn as a disguise to get in the village and retrieve the antenna although he succeeds in this he has found himself in a middle-class mans life style (bad job, marriage counseling)and after being beaten up by gangsters for money he is taken to the hospital where the king is being treated, Bertrum tells him to remove the antenna from his fathers skull (as the king is expected to live unless the antenna is disturbed). Saul's cover is blown when attempting this, but right before the mole men advance on him Johny comes in and plays a song, much to the mole men's enjoyment. this allows Saul to broadcast a short message to STRATA with the antenna (which still lodged in the king's skull) but the antenna explodes, leaving his fate unknown.
3	"The Finger of Fate or the Fateful Finger"	Tom Stern	Hugh Davidson	February 25, 2007	103
The explosion sends Saul onto a small plateau surrounded by a sea of lava which shortly after the antenna turns to dust, where he talks to a sentient rock that tells him he is destined to be leader of the Mole Men. The king dies, and since his 'hand of succession' turned into snakes before he appointed an heir, a vote is held. Johnny Tambourine receives the most applause at the election debate, so he is elected king. Saul, in a fit of rage, chokes Johnny, and in response the royal guards throw him into jail.
4	"Fun King Johnny"	Tom Stern	Josh Gardner	March 4, 2007	104
Saul is jailed for assaulting the new king of the Mole Men, Johnny Tambourine. After a short stint in jail, Saul is given a "fair" trial, which is actually a battle against a giant worm-like monster. If the monster spares Saul, he will be deemed innocent and set free, but if the worm eats him he will be guilty. Bertrum has proposed a plan, Project Thunderhole. In this plan, the Mole Men would dig a huge hole in the ceiling of their caverns to the 'Taboo Area' (the surface of the Earth). But Clancy, the more conservative brother of Bertrum, mentions during the trial that such a plan is forbidden without the consult of a professional bonded geologist, and though Johnny reveals that Saul is a geologist, he may be too late.. Saul is being chewed in half by the worm.
5	"Work the Sack"	Tom Stern	Tom Stern	March 11, 2007	105
Bertrum kicks the worm and it releases Saul unharmed. Saul is unsure whether he should approve Project Thunderhole, but upon consulting the sentient rocks atop the lava-surrounded plateau, he does approve it. At a party thrown by Bertrum to celebrate the approval, a burlap sack containing a 'mutant' is dragged out and beaten by the Mole Men for entertainment. Though invited by Bertrum to partake in the beating, Saul is initially reluctant, but eventually begins to pummel the mutant when Bertrum, Robot, a strange god-like radish, and the Mole Men in general encourage him. As Saul beats it unmercifully, the bag comes open and out falls... a beautiful woman!
6	"Moustache Ride"	Tom Stern	Josh Gardner	March 18, 2007	106
Saul is mesmerized by the beauty of what the Mole Men consider to be an ugly mutant. Saul asks for her name, but she is unable to talk. Robot suggests that some peanut butter will allow her to regain her speech. After sucking on Saul's thumb, covered in STRATA Peanut Butter, she reveals that her name is Fallopia. Johnny Tambourine dismisses her beauty, claiming that he could get any regular Mole Women he wanted, creating no need to go after a mutant. Saul nervously asks Fallopia out on a date, to which Fallopia, who has never been asked out before, gladly accepts. While preparing, Saul fantasizes about the date, imagining giving Fallopia a ride on his motorcycle and moustache. Saul arrives at Fallopia's place, but is greeted by peculiar noises. Saul discovers Johnny engaging in sexual activities with Fallopia and is heartbroken. Meanwhile, other STRATA members devise a plan to rescue the trapped crew, which leads them to charter a ship to Indochina.
7	"What's Happening Down There?"	Tom Stern	Tom Stern	March 25, 2007	107
Saul is outraged by Fallopia and Johnny and he runs away crying while Project Thunder Hole has just begun and is rapidly killing many mole diggers. Clancy is too busy trying to stop Bertrum from continuing Project Thunder Hole to take his son Lil' to Puberty Gulch to catch his testes. So Lil', like Saul, is now depressed. Saul and Lil meet up and Lil' describes his problem and Saul agrees to take Lil' to Puberty Gulch in order to find a pair of testes. However, the hunt for Lil's testicles becomes more difficult when he reveals that if he does not find a pair by the end of the day he will become intersexed and remain a hermaphrodite the rest of his life like his father. Eventually Saul retrieves a pair of testicles for Lil', but soon after, Saul is captured by a strange bat-like creature who works for a villain named the "Birdbat Leader" who has been stalking him throughout the episode with a monitor that seemingly spies on Saul.
8	"IC-CAWWWWW"	Tom Stern	Craig Lewis	April 1, 2007	108
Saul is tortured by the Birdbat Leader, who demands Saul surrender "the stone", which Saul doesn't realize is his amber stone. Meanwhile, Fallopia, Lil', Johnny, and Robot launch a rescue mission, which ends up to be rather disastrous; Robot ends up collapsing and being left behind and Johnny (who begins having temper tantrums) is left behind when his capsule he is in is used as a bridge to get across a large chasm the team encounter. Lil' and Fallopia finally make it to the Birdbat Leader's lair, where the Birdbats attack the intruders and Lil' suddenly transforms because of his testicles, and pulls out a laser gun and starts shooting all of the attacking Birdbats, and Fallopia starts fighting off more of them, all as Johnny ponders about what a jerk he has been to the rest of the crew. Fallopia finally rescues Saul, who gets up and takes both the gun and the testicles from Lil' to turn him back to normal, as well as the amber stone. As the episode ends, the escaped Birdbat Leader is seen talking to a mysterious green monster-like creature that appears to be his master. Then the Birbat Leader summons two minions, a revived Captain Jim J. James and Lieutenant Jen E. James, both with large rocks covering their heads and moving around strangely, and orders them to take out Saul.
9	"A Hammer in His Hand"	Tom Stern	Hugh Davidson	April 8, 2007	109
Saul goes with Bertrum to the Project Thunderhole site, where Saul tries to help the molemen dig the hole. While inspecting the site from the inside, however, Saul becomes trapped in a cave-in. Saul soon finds an escape, into a machine-lined room with a large man inside. Back in the cave, the man turns out to be John Henry (played by Tiny Lister), the folk hero, who is now a cyborg, with a hammer for a right arm and machine parts over his right eye. At first he keeps Saul as a prisoner, but they quickly become friends. Meanwhile, the captain of the Indochina-bound ship pushes the ship into a vicious storm, then starts shooting at the STRATA operatives when they resist his ship-saving plan to throw the new drilling machine overboard. Back at the cave, John Henry and Saul get attacked by the revived, rock-headed Captain Jim J. James and Lieutenant Jen E. James. John Henry tells Saul to escape, but first he gives Saul his most precious possession, stored in a compartment in his stomach; a blue amber stone that's the same size and shape as Saul's yellow stone. Saul escapes as John Henry fights the rock-a-fied crew. The episode ends as Saul places the two stones together, causing them to glow a bright green color.
10	"Children of Embers' Blaze"	Tom Stern & Peter Girardi	Tom Stern	April 15, 2007	110
Saul wanders around in the upper caverns, trying to find a way out, when he is suddenly confronted by the rock-headed crew members that were fighting John Henry earlier (there is a short scene however that right before the rockheads attack him he holds the stones together which cause them to glow green and also a small door with a mole men statue over it to glow too which indicates that this the chamber that Clancy keeps all his souvenirs from his trip to the surface in the 18th century as well as the mother rock this won't come up to episode 16).He runs from them, but is stopped by a chasm, which he accidentally falls into. He crashes through a layer of rock to land in a vast desert (with sky). He quickly becomes thirsty and speculates that he is in some sort of purgatory. Meanwhile, the STRATA operatives aboard the Indochina ship try to hide from the crazed ship captain, but fail. The captain points his pistol at one of the operatives and laughs maniacally, but the other operative chokes him to death with a garrote. As the captain dies, he shoots the bottom of the boat, causing it to leak. The operatives escape by boarding the second drilling machine and going into the ocean, where they slowly sink towards the bottom. Back in the desert, a vision of John Henry appears to Saul and tells him that he must confront his fears. Saul is too scared and keeps wandering the desert instead. He soon meets a group of burning dancers, who tell Saul that he must dance freely in order to ascend away from the desert. He sees an old bearded man atop a pyramid and the flaming people tell him his name is 'Luas', but that no one can ever see Luas unless they do an odd spin dance and fly up high enough to the top of the pyramid which no one has ever done. Saul tries anyway and as he levitates higher than anyone else, the burning people try to grab his ankles. They fail and he levitates over to Luas. Luas tells Saul that the burning people are actually self-obsessed egotists who only tell people about salvation so that they can get more attention. Luas also tells Saul that the stones are very important and then begins to chant a strange message right before he disappears (when played backwards, the message is revealed to be saying "This pyramid is a space ship."). After the flaming people see the stones they become enraged and savagely attempt to steal them but Saul takes out a rock from above him causing water to pour down from it in a huge flood, dousing the flaming people.
11	"Faster Robot! Upload! Upload!"	Tom Stern	Hugh Davidson	April 29, 2007	111
The two STRATA Operators, having been sunk stranded in the X-2 Drill Ship, receive a report from Robot's hard-drive. It reflects all the events that went on in the series, from the X-1 drill ship tragedy up to the ending of "Children of Ember's Blaze." Interwoven along with the flashbacks are uncut production scenes (with visible greenscreen) and some purposely made "bloopers." After recapping all the events, Robot reflects on his childhood. (This part is in conflict with the continuity given in Episode 2, as it shows Robot growing up as a robot, rather than a human child. This conflicts because it says in Episode 2 that he "checked the organ donor box on his driver's license" and that his brain was placed in the robot.) This is also where we see the first images of his childhood friend Murph. After revealing that his only regret was not being in the arms of Johnny Tambourine, he starts his auto-termination sequence. The STRATA Operators reveal that the mission was actually "Project Tambourine," which the full story behind this isn't released yet, instead of the widely believed cause. The operators try to hack into Robot from the drill ship, which works successfully, and they (apparently) die with their job done. The hack activates Robot's rocket boosters, which short out, tumbling him down the face of the mountain where he was left in Episode 8.
12	"The Girly Bird Gets the Ring"	Tom Stern	Hugh Davidson	May 6, 2007	112
While Clancy and Lil engage in an exercise involving levitation of a strange object, Clancy discovers that Lil's testicles were removed by Saul after his murderous rampage. At the Birdbat lair, the Birdbat Leader surveys the carnage and vows vengeance against Lil in the wake of his minions' deaths. Pondering where his daughter, Princessa, has gone, we find her and King Johnny Tambourine in a secluded forest grove, both expressing their love for one another. A Birdbat soldier arrives to report that war with the Mole Men is imminent, and the Leader demands that Princessa return immediately. When she arrives, The Birdbat Leader and Princessa verbally clash about her love affair with King Johnny, and the Leader reveals the basis of the Birdbats' long-standing grudge against the Mole Men. He orders Princessa to be incarcerated to prevent her from seeing Johnny again. Meanwhile, Clancy tries to plan war strategy with King Johnny, who is too distracted by his feelings for Princessa to offer any help. Robot suddenly crashes through the wall and into the war room, apparently after tumbling down the mountain from episode 11. Later, the two lovers secretly meet again in the forest. Johnny proposes to Princessa and a nearby talking tree offers to wed them. Back at his lair, the Birdbat Leader is reprimanded by his evil Master for waging a distracting war; recovering Saul's stone is his Master's first priority. The Leader promises that Saul is being pursued by his Rockhead Assassins. After the Master exits, a Birdbat soldier announces King Johnny and Princessa's wedding plans. As the ceremony in the forest is completed, the Birdbat Leader arrives to stop the wedding. Clancy also arrives with Lil to protest King Johnny's new alliance with the Birdbats. As the two advancing armies approach, the Birdbat Leader poses an alternative to war: give up the child Lil to satisfy his vengeance, and the Birdbat forces will withdraw. Clancy steadfastly refuses, and the furious Leader aims his weapon at Lil to fire. Both Clancy and Johnny jump in front of Lil to shield him; however, Princessa jumps in front of all three and catches the bullet. She collapses in front of Johnny, who seems to go into shock, while the Birdbat Leader wails for his fallen daughter. Note: Saul is only seen briefly three times in this episode, continually running from the flood of water he unleashed in episode 10.
13	"Saul Comes Back"	Tom Stern	Craig Lewis	May 20, 2007	113
Picking up after the events of the last episode, the Birdbat Leader wails for his daughter's apparent death. She then was revealed to be alive, with her father accidentally squeezing the trigger, killing her, to Bertrum's amusement. Then, Johnny finds out that this whole time, he was in a glass container, which caused much screaming. In the midst of the disarray, Saul jumps in, and tells them they should love, not fight. Then, the wave from episode 10 strikes, drowning the underground Mole Men city, which is soon drained by the crashing of the STRATA X-2, with the 2 STRATA operators coming out. Saul comes out with his original stone, and faces the two rock-headed Captain Jim J. James and Lieutenant Jen E. James. After a fight, they are knocked out by Fallopia, who gives him the other stone. At the Birdbat lair, the Leader tells a still shocked Johnny that they can bring Princessa back, but first he must find Saul's stones. Then, Saul goes to the sentient rock, and he proceeds to ask what the stones are for. While holding them up, the rock (and five other rocks around it) all begin to chant a mysterious message. Then, the STRATA operators appear, and give Saul the phone. The President of the United States is on the line, telling Saul not to show the rock the stones.
14	"Spare Me My Beets"	Tom Stern	Hugh Davidson	May 27, 2007	114
Upon the President telling Saul to leave to go to the surface, Saul sets out to say his good-byes and try to convince Fallopia to join him to the surface. The Mole men begin the annual Beet Festival, during which Clancy tries to strangle Saul and take the stones. While all of this, the leader of the Bird-bats grow tired of Johnny and decides Johnny is too dumb to help him retrieve the stones that will bring back his deceased wife and daughter. The leader, then proceeds with the giving of life to the cheap Johnny Tamborine dolls to do his bidding and retrieve Saul's stones.
15	"Village of the Damned Dolls"	Tom Stern	Tom Stern	June 3, 2007	115
The animated Johnny Tamborine dolls go on a killing spree, murdering numerous mole men and the STRATA technicians repairing the drill ship. Saul is saved from Clancy's wrath when Li'l tells his father the rest of their family is alone and defenseless with a killer on the loose, making Clancy decide to spare Saul for the time being to protect his family. Saul goes looking for Fallopia and thinks she's been murdered too, but she turns up alive and has decided to come to the surface with him. They find the murdered STRATA members and Johnny's name half-scrawled in the dirt. Saul accuses Johnny of the murders, but soon the dolls are discovered to be responsible. Clancy reluctantly takes the recurring characters to a hideout in the Thunder Hole for safety, where they make a last stand against the dolls. Although much time is spent reloading their muskets, eventually all but one of the dolls is killed, which takes Fallopia hostage and demands the stones.
16	"Poor Clancy's Almanack"	Tom Stern	Craig Lewis	June 10, 2007	116
Saul is about to hand over the stones when Clancy stops him and explains himself; some two hundred years ago he found a letter and dug his way to the surface in colonial Philadelphia to deliver it. He made friends with its recipient, Benjamin Franklin, who was the custodian of the two stones, the key to the power of the Gabro Maternicus, the mother rock. After Clancy killed a crazed Thomas Jefferson, one of a group intent on using the rock's power to win the American Revolution, Franklin told him to hide the stones and watch over the Gabro Maternicus to prevent its powers from ever being unleashed or it would mean the end of the world. Eventually the stones ended up in the hands of Saul and John Henry. Suddenly the Birdbat Leader appears and rips off Saul's mustache which makes him drop the stones. The Birdbat Leader attaches them to the Gabro Maternicus and shouts that its power will be his. Note: The 2008 Adult Swim special, Young Person's Guide to History, was based on this episode.
17	"Saul-ID Rock"	Tom Stern	Hugh Davidson	June 24, 2007	117
The Birdbat Leader attempts to use the power of the rock to resurrect his wife and daughter but fails and teleports away. The Birdbat's master mocks him and says it was just using him. An opening for a third stone appears in the Gabro Maternicus, and Saul collapses from a "tummy ache" but "lower". Clancy tries to get to the bottom of this and takes a book from Ben Franklin's coffin. Despite it being over 200 years old, he finds it has pictures of Saul and even a picture of himself reading the book. The Blob Doctor shrinks and enters Saul's body to find the source of his pain, and when he finds it, panics. He tries to kill Saul with an axe but is shot just in time by someone behind a curtain. Johnny sings a song mourning Saul. Saul has a near-death experience where the sentient rock tells him that it wants to use the Gabro Maternicus's power to usher in the next level of existence. Saul is about to wake up when the doctor awakens and buries the axe in his chest, killing him.
18	"The Call of the Zither"	Tom Stern	Hugh Davidson	July 1, 2007	118
Clancy, Fallopia, Lil, and several Moleman priests are gathered at Saul's funeral when Clancy reveals that his book states that Saul will arise from the dead. Sure enough, Saul bursts the lid off his coffin and returns to life. Clancy, convinced Saul is evil, chains him to a nearby wall and leaves to seek further answers. A groinal growth expands inside Saul and he does nothing more than repeat the phrase 'GREATNESS, INSIDE OF ME' and 'WORK TO BE DONE' as he strains against the chains. Meanwhile, Bertrum, Robot, and Johnny Tambourine drill towards the Taboo Area. When a shaman and the doctor combine their knowledge to try to save Saul, the plan backfires and turns the shaman into a delicious, though piping hot, confectionery. Saul breaks free from his chains and stumbles towards the Mother Rock, where his ever-enlarging groinal area comes ever closer to the vertical slit in the Mother Rock. Bertrum, meanwhile, reveals that he has turned his drill back towards the center of the Earth, though he does not say why.
19	"A Rock and a Hard Place"	Tom Stern	Craig Lewis	July 8, 2007	119
Saul's inserts his groinal growth into the vertical slit in the Mother Rock. With a burst of pleasure, the third amber stone shoots out of Saul's growth and into the slit, and falls underground and perfectly into the third empty space in the lower Mother Rock, powering it up. As Saul continues to talk to the slit rock afterwards, Clancy climbs on top of it and moves apart the moss growing on top to reveal that Otnip, the evil Mole Men devil made of lichen and moss, is actually the Mother Rock. Otnip then says that Saul is actually not human but a rock man and that his father was a rock (which is why the third rock was inside him). After he says this, Saul begins transforming into a rock man, but with inspiration from John Henry, Luas, and his old geology teacher, Saul fights the transformation, leaps up into the air, and punches Otnip in the eye, then transforms back into his human form. Otnip then describes that with the Mother Rock's power he will fire a giant laser through the slit in the Mother Rock into space, causing asteroids to fall to Earth and destroy everything that is not rock kind. Clancy then says that he would need a giant hole reaching from the center of the Earth to space in order to do that. Just then, the STRATA drill ship crashes through the upper rocks and Bertrum enters, saying that he just made that hole and that Project Thunder Hole was actually just a plan to make the hole for the laser. Robot, distraught, commits suicide and turns into a pile of snakes and electronics. When Clancy asks why he would work for Otnip, Bertrum says that he did it because Otnip promised him that he would make him king of the Mole Men (though he would only be king until the asteroids destroy the world). Clancy summons the Beet God to defeat Otnip, but Otnip shoots him with lightning and kills him. Otnip then orders his rock minions to attack the gang, but the Birdbats descend and rescue Saul, Fallopia, Johnny, Lil, Clancy, Mrs. Burrows, the Flying Pancake and the Doctor but leave Bertrum to die. The Mother Rock fires the laser, which shoots far beyond Mars, Saturn, and even Jupiter, and asteroids converge in space just outside Earth.
20	"Master of Rock, Master of Destiny"	Tom Stern	Craig Lewis	July 15, 2007	120
Saul, Fallopia, the Birdbat Leader, Johnny, and the Burrows family all gather together to think of a way to stop the incoming asteroids from destroying the Earth and they all look to Saul for the plan. However, not knowing what to do, Saul runs off to think by himself. When staring in the mirror Saul looks at his STRATA nametag and notices Saul spelled backwards is Luas. Luas then appears and chants the same message he did in episode ten, which Saul then realizes says backwards "This pyramid is a spaceship". The group run to the pyramid to stop the asteroids. After activating the ship with a moleman hand, a birdbat hook, and Saul's face, they board the ship, including Bertrum who runs in without permission. The Doctor is crushed by the opening door of the spaceship however Fallopia is about to give Saul a kiss before they leave but the two rock versions of STRATA Captain Jim J. James and Jen E. James come and pull Saul away. Saul nearly defeats them, but they fuse together to form a gigantic rock monster. Saul, Clancy, and Stromulus (the Birdbat Leader) all try to destroy the monster but all fail; however, Saul uses his inner rock self to telepathically find out the weakness of the monster which turns out to be his neck. Upon looking at the monster they find that it has no neck, but Saul tells them it is an internal neck. Stromulus uses a high-pitched screech to stun the monster while Clancy digs into its stomach and Saul jumps into Clancy's tunnel and uses a shovel to destroy its neck. The monster collapses and the dying bodies of Jim J. James and Jen E. James are left lying on the ground. The Captain tells Saul that he is a great hero, but calls him Nathaniel. Saul tells him that his name isn't Nathaniel but then Saul's rival in geology Nathaniel Baltimore, who always doubted his Mother Rock theory, appears and tells him that Jim was talking to him. Nathaniel says to Saul that his "feeble" mind knows nothing of the true Mother Rock, and he too boards the ship with Saul. Once on the ship, they become the new STRATA Space Team. However, when they attempt to take off, Otnip (who now appears in a giant form) seizes the ship and stops it from taking off. Clancy jumps out and sacrifices himself, seemingly destroying Otnip in a green explosion. The episode ends with a parody of the STRATA opening of the first episode showing the new STRATA Space Team consisting of Saul, Lil, Fallopia, Johnny, Stromulus, Bertrum, The Flying Pancake and 'Old Fashioned Bisexual' Nathaniel Baltimore. The last scene shows all the alive characters on the spaceship (Saul, Fallopia, Johnny, Stromulus, Betrum, Lil, Nathaniel Baltimore, Mrs. Burrows, The Flying Pancake, and Chinacula) as they head to deal with the asteroids.

== International broadcast ==
In Canada, Saul of the Mole Men previously aired on Teletoon's Teletoon at Night block, and currently airs on the Canadian version of Adult Swim.
