= Confederate privateer =

Ship authorized to attack by the Confederate States of America

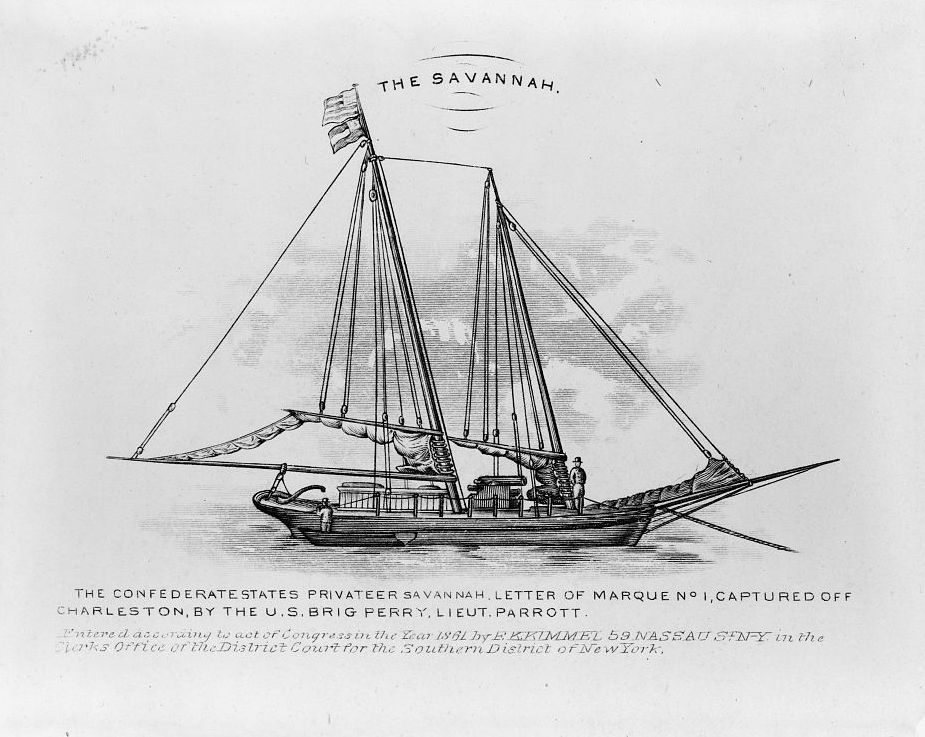
Confederate privateer Savannah

The Confederate privateers were privately owned ships that were authorized by the government of the Confederate States of America to attack the shipping of the United States. Although the appeal was to profit by capturing merchant vessels and seizing their cargoes, the government was most interested in diverting the efforts of the Union Navy away from the blockade of Southern ports, and perhaps to encourage European intervention in the conflict.

At the beginning of the American Civil War, the Confederate government sought to counter the United States Navy in part by appealing to private enterprise worldwide to engage in privateering against United States shipping. Privateering was the practice of fitting ordinary private merchant vessels with modest armament, then sending them to sea to capture other merchant vessels in return for monetary reward. The captured vessels and cargo fell under customary prize rules at sea. Prizes would be taken to the jurisdiction of a competent court, which could be in the sponsoring country or theoretically in any neutral port. If the court found that the capture was legal, the ship and cargo would be forfeited and sold at a prize auction. The proceeds would be distributed among owners and crew according to a contractual arrangement. Privateers were also authorized to attack an enemy's navy warships and then apply to the sponsoring government for direct monetary reward, usually gold or gold specie (coins).

In the early days of the war, enthusiasm for The Confederacy was high, and many ship owners responded to the appeal by applying for letters of marque. Not all of those who gained authorization actually went to sea, but the numbers of privateers were high enough to be a major concern for US Secretary of the Navy Gideon Welles. Many ships of the Union Navy were diverted from blockade duty in efforts to capture privateers. Most of the privateers managed to remain free, but enough were caught that the owners and crew had to consider the risk seriously. The capture of the privateers Savannah and Jefferson Davis resulted in important court cases that did much to define the nature of the Civil War itself.

Initial enthusiasm could not be sustained. The initial prospects for profit were dealt a crippling blow after neutral states quickly closed their ports to all privateers, who found it difficult to deliver their captures to Confederate ports against an increasingly effective Union blockade. As a result the expected profits were never realized. By the end of the first year of the war, the risks far exceeded the benefits in the minds of most owners and crews. The practice continued only sporadically through the rest of the war as the Confederate government turned its efforts against Northern commerce over to commissioned Confederate Navy commerce raiders such as the CSS Alabama and CSS Florida.

The Civil War was the last time a belligerent power seriously resorted to privateering. The practice had already been outlawed among European countries by the Declaration of Paris (1856). Following the Civil War, the United States agreed to abide by the Declaration of Paris. More important than any international agreements, however, was the recognition by ship owners that the increased cost and sophistication of maritime vessels and naval weaponry had effectively eliminated any reasonable prospects for profit for private enterprise naval warfare.

== Call for privateers ==
Following the 12 April 1861 bombardment of Fort Sumter in Charleston Harbor, President Abraham Lincoln called for raising 75,000 volunteers from state militia to put down the "rebellion". In response, on the 17th of April, Confederate President Jefferson Davis called both for raising troops and for the issuance of letters of marque.

Although the Federal government had only 42 warships in commission, and many of the best were laid up as unserviceable or distributed widely around the world, the Confederate States had almost nothing to offer in opposition. With no navy yet established, they turned to the alternative of privateering. The word "privateer" applies to any private citizen in the world who raises a ship and crew to engage in the destruction of enemy shipping for profit. Although specifically allowing attacks upon enemy warships, privateers are typically amateurs employed against commercial shipping because armed navy ships are more likely to fight back effectively. Privateering is authorized by the issuance of "letters of marque and reprisal" by a sponsoring government. It was explicitly allowed by the Confederate Constitution the words of which were copied almost directly from the American Constitution. With a mission to prey upon commercial vessels of the enemy, their pay would consist of the value of seized ships and cargoes, also known as prizes, less legal costs. Two benefits would accrue to the Confederate government; the disruption of commerce might persuade the European nations to pressure the North to end the conflict, and it would also force the North on its own to ease the expected blockade in order to chase down the privateers. When the war began, "legitimate" privateers could legally clear prizes in neutral ports, which were literally worldwide. Therefore, privateers were a credible threat to the national security of the United States, whereas if the Confederate States could tie up the Union Navy in the protection of Northern shipping, any blockade, which was expected but not yet declared, would be at least mitigated and the Southern Confederacy would be seen as a new world power to be respected.

Prior to the hostilities between the North and South, the majority of European maritime powers had declared the practice of privateering to be illegal by the Declaration of Paris (1856). According to the treaty, privateers of signatory nations were strictly illegal and if caught they could be seized by the ships of any other signatory nation and tried in that nation's courts. However, they were not exactly the same as pirates. Privateers enjoyed limited legal status if they did not murder and if they behaved generally according to the laws of their sponsoring non-signatory government. Thus acting, they were not subject to the death penalty as if they were rogue buccaneers. True piracy was a crime everywhere and the death penalty for piracy was accepted worldwide. In 1856, the United States had declined to ratify the Declaration, or Treaty, of Paris in order to preserve the rights of a smaller fledgling nation against the larger maritime powers of the day. Now Lincoln wanted exactly the same protection against privateers as the European powers did in 1856, which the United States had denied. As a non-signatory of the Treaty, Lincoln could have legally raised a call for privateers himself, but he had much to lose by engaging in the practice because it could have stirred the wrath of the greatest maritime powers on earth, Great Britain, France and Spain, whom he wished instead would join in condemnation of the Confederacy as an illegal government. The Confederate States had little to lose and much to gain if they could neutralize the United States Navy and force the world to see them as a respectable world power. Surely, they believed, recognition of Southern sovereignty would follow.

When the Civil War broke out it was clearly in the interest of the Lincoln government to suppress privateering and Lincoln tried belatedly to make the United States a signatory of the Treaty which was denied by the Europeans. However, if Lincoln wanted any respect or cooperation by the British (other nations would generally follow British policy) he would have to observe all the rules of the Treaty and not resort to privateering himself. The British government, which was the primary sponsor of the Treaty of Paris, made clear that it would not tolerate the death penalty for privateering. This was especially because at the time it was common practice for citizens of neutral nations to serve both on privateers and in national navies. London therefore had reason to fear the prospect of British subjects aboard Southern privateers facing prosecution in American courts on trumped-up charges of piracy.

If the previous signatories had accepted American entry into the scope of the treaty, it would have meant that they were taking sides in the rebellion. Rather than do so, they insisted that the United States should get its own house in order first. The governments of the treaty participants, perhaps in following Britain's lead, proclaimed their neutrality and accepted the blockade without recognizing the sovereignty of the Davis government except as a de facto belligerent, the same as the United States, while continuing to recognize the Lincoln government as the legal American government. Nevertheless, the status of "belligerent" gave the seceding states invaluable practical rights almost equal to being recognized as a nation. Recognized belligerents had certain rights such as securing foreign loans, purchasing foreign arms and the use of neutral ports as harbors of refuge and repair for warships. By an odd twist in the 1856 treaty, the privateers of a belligerent power who had not signed the treaty also had the right to clear their prizes in neutral ports. Great Britain, followed by other signatory nations, quickly revoked that right on May 13, 1861, with a Proclamation by Queen Victoria declaring neutral ports across the Empire to be off limits to prize clearing. British neutrality was taken initially by Lincoln to be openly hostile to the United States because of the implied recognition, however, Lincoln was actually handed a triumph to his own foreign policy. The modified British policy actually worked to the advantage of the Federal government because it meant that British, French, and Spanish prize courts, including those in colonies in the Caribbean, were closed to privateers. They would therefore, in order to make good their prizes, have to take them into Confederate seaports for adjudication. Lincoln was suddenly spared of having to spread his Navy beyond impossible limits and he could concentrate on the blockade.

Of course it also meant that if he were to accept the British ruling, Abraham Lincoln had to acknowledge that a war existed and the Southern Confederacy was more than a few states in insurrection. Shipowners throughout the South, and perhaps some from the North as well, responded with enthusiasm to the call. The largest privateer, Phenix, was from Wilmington, Delaware. The initial burst of ardor was great enough that the Confederate government could lay down some rather stringent conditions, such as requiring the deposit of large bonds, to insure that the practice did not degenerate into outright piracy. The holders of letters of marque were also required to be the actual owners of the ships; this was to discourage speculation in the letters.

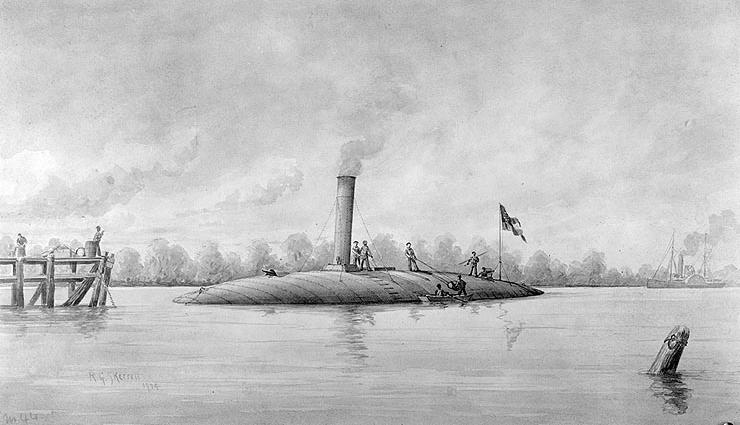
CSS Mananass {1904 drawing}

An anomalous feature of the legislation governing Confederate privateering was that it allowed attacking enemy warships. To give an incentive in the absence of valuable cargoes of merchant vessels that could be sold for profit, the law provided for fixed monetary awards for capturing or destroying ships of the US Navy, with the size of the awards to be based on the numbers in the crews and the value of the ships taken or destroyed. This provision was never applied, as no Union warships were destroyed by privateers. A near exception was provided by the armored ram CSS Manassas, which started as a privateer at New Orleans by riverboat Captain John A. Stevenson. Before he could take his ship into battle, however, she was seized by the Confederate Navy and put under the command of Lieutenant Alexander F. Warley. Manassas performed creditably at the Battle of the Head of Passes and Battle of Forts Jackson and St. Philip, but Stevenson and his backers got no reward.

Privateering activity was strongest at the major ports of Charleston, Savannah, and New Orleans, and off the North Carolina coast where the trade of Northern cities with Caribbean and South American countries made use of the Gulf Stream to speed their northward voyages. The first capture of the war was made on 16 May 1861, when the bark Ocean Eagle was taken by privateer J. C. Calhoun at the mouth of the Mississippi River. Ocean Eagle was registered in New England, so the capture was legal, but it is not clear that it aided the South, as she was carrying her cargo of lime to New Orleans. By disrupting the New Orleans trade, the privateers there actually aided the blockade. Privateering activity near Cape Hatteras, on the coast of North Carolina, was particularly irksome to the Union.

Because of privateers, many Northern shipowners either dropped out of the Caribbean trade or transferred their registry to Great Britain to sail under the protection of the British flag. Insurers pressured the Federal government to defend their interests. In response, the Union sent a combined Army-Navy expedition to take possession of two Confederate forts at the Hatteras Inlet. This was the first reclamation of seceded territory by the Union, and was also the first notable Union success of the war.

Confederate Privateering was not as minor as many retrospective analyses have claimed. It posed the first threat to national security because it had the potential to have instantly put more hostile ships at sea than the U.S. Navy could effectively suppress while also striving to enforce a blockade. Furthermore, it resulted in Lincoln's first proclamation of a blockade, the first internationally recognized act of belligerence on his part, which helped to nudge the war into international waters; and it produced the first Union strategy for the conduct of war. President Lincoln's Secretary of the Navy, Gideon Welles, ordered the Blockading Squadron to secure the primary privateering ports of the South, which was accomplished quickly by joint Army/Navy actions against Forts Hattaras and Clark at the inlet to the NC Sounds, Forts Beauregard and Walker at Port Royal Sound, and Ship Island near New Orleans—all by the end of 1861, while other military efforts, that is, purely Army efforts, stalled.

== Union suppression of privateers: three Charleston vessels ==
Charleston provided a large fraction of privateering activity, and it is fitting that the fates of three of them were particularly important in its early demise. The three vessels were Petrel, Jefferson Davis, and Savannah.

=== Privateer Savannah ===
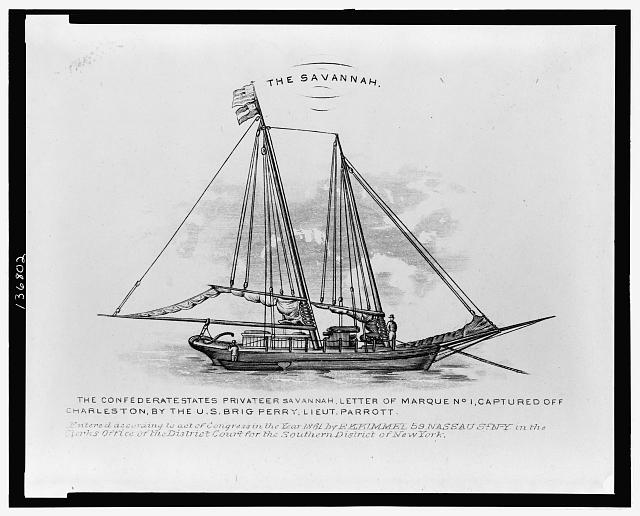
The Confederate States privateer Savannah

First to leave Charleston Harbor, on 2 June 1861, was the privateer Savannah. Her second day at sea, she captured brig Joseph, and thereby became the first Charleston privateer to take a prize in the war. Later the same day, she chased another sail, but discovered too late that it was USS Perry, an armed brig. After a brief running gun battle, Captain T. Harrison Baker of Savannah surrendered his lightly armed ship. He and his men were put in irons and were taken to New York, where they were imprisoned and tried for piracy (see below).

=== Privateer Jefferson Davis ===
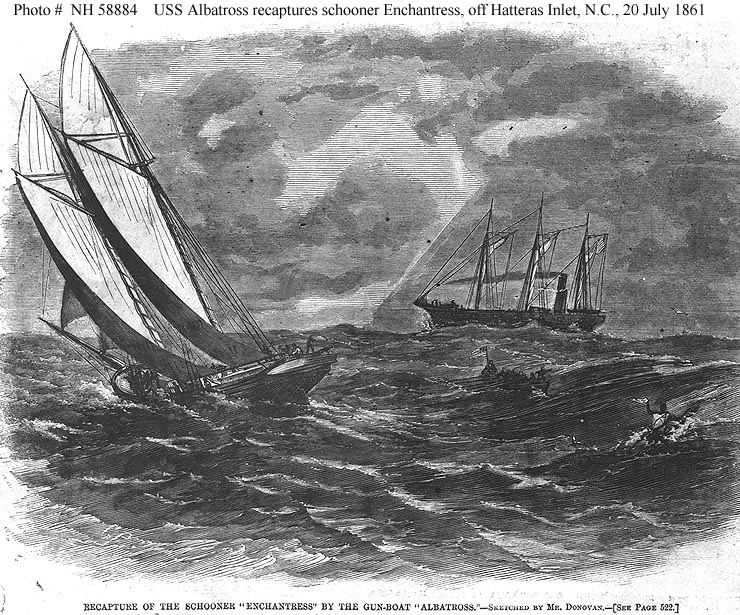
Recapture of schooner Enchantress by USS Albatross

Jefferson Davis was a 187-ton brig, originally named Putnam at her launching in about 1845. Sometime later she was renamed Echo, and under that name was used in the illegal African slave trade. On 21 August 1858 she was captured by the brig USS Dolphin off the coast of Cuba with 270 Africans aboard; the Africans were transported to Liberia, where they were set free. Echo was taken to Key West, where a court held that her seizure was valid, and she was confiscated and sold at auction. Her new owners restored her original name and applied for a letter of marque at the start of the Civil War. A week later, they amended their application to rename their ship the Jefferson Davis in honor of the Confederate president. Despite the name changes, Northern newspapers consistently referred to her as "the former slaver Echo."

On 28 June 1861, Jefferson Davis slipped out of Charleston Harbor and easily evaded the rudimentary blockade that was then in place. She remained at sea for nearly two months, making nine captures: the schooner Enchantress, brig John Welsh, schooner S. J. Waring, brig Mary E. Thompson, ship Mary Goodell, ship John Carver, bark Alvarado, schooner Windward, and brig Santa Clara. Of these, Enchantress was recaptured, Alvarado was chased ashore and destroyed by a blockader, Windward, Mary E. Thompson, and Mary Goodell were released with prisoners, John Carver was burned at sea, and the black cook of S. J. Waring killed three sleeping members of the prize crew and sailed her to New York City, where he was received as a hero. Only John Welsh and Santa Clara were taken into Southern ports for adjudication.

Jefferson Davis attempted to enter St. Augustine, Florida, but arrived off the coast during a gale. Unwilling to risk capture by nearby blockaders, her captain chose not to ride out the storm. Jefferson Davis ran aground on 18 August 1861 and could not get free. Her crew were saved, but the ship was a total loss.

=== Privateer Petrel ===
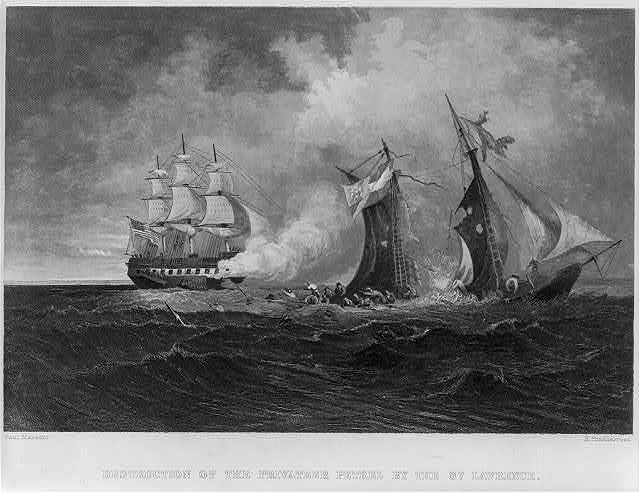
Destruction of the privateer Petrel by the USS St. Lawrence.

Petrel had been Revenue Cutter Aiken before the war. Seized by the state of South Carolina, she was offered to the Confederate States Navy, but was rejected as unsuitable. Renamed Petrel, she was sold to private interests who outfitted her as a privateer. On 28 July 1861, she left Charleston and the same day encountered the frigate USS St. Lawrence. Unable to escape, Captain William Perry decided to fight. In a twenty-minute gun battle, Petrel's hull was holed and she began sinking. Perry then hauled down his flag. Four members of the crew were lost with the ship. The rest, including Perry, were put in irons and taken to Philadelphia, where they, like the crew of Savannah, were to be tried for piracy.

== Trial of the officers and crew of the privateer Savannah ==
Through much of the first year of the war, the government in Washington continued to regard the conflict as merely an insurrection, and that the Confederate government had no legal standing. According to the view of the Lincoln administration, the letters of marque issued by Jefferson Davis or the seceded states had no legal force, and the privateersmen who relied upon them did not represent a legitimate authority. Taking merchant vessels on the high seas therefore was piracy, with the penalty of death upon conviction.

The first trial for piracy was of the 13 men, including Captain Thomas H. Baker, captured on privateer Savannah. The trial was held in the United States Circuit Court for the Southern District of New York. It began on 23 October 1861, and from the start attracted wide public notice. The mere fact of the trial drew outrage in the Confederacy, where the government threatened retaliation, life for life. To increase pressure on Washington, the prisoners of war who would have been executed in retaliation were selected and their names made known. The trial went to the jury on the seventh day, but the next day the jury announced that it was deadlocked. The prisoners were sent back to prison to await a second trial. The United States government, however, had decided that it would no longer press the charges. The thirteen men would not be regarded as pirates, but as prisoners of war. They later were exchanged. The decision in effect meant that Washington was conceding the rights of belligerency to those who took up arms against it at sea.

== The end of privateering ==
With the examples of Petrel, Jefferson Davis, and Savannah before them, shipowners realized that privateering was no longer profitable, and the practice soon died out. Some privateers sailed during the remainder of the war, but none had even the qualified success of Jefferson Davis.

The reason for the demise was not purely economic. Privateering represented a decentralization of power that was inconsistent with both technology and the evolution of the modern state. It fell victim to changes: steam power and gunnery in ships, more rapid communications that enabled greater central control, and the increasing reluctance of governments everywhere to relinquish power. It was this last that doomed privateering, according to Robinson, the primary modern historian of the Confederate privateers; his opinion is echoed by Luraghi. The effort of the Confederate government turned from privateers to their regularly commissioned raiders, which had spectacularly more success in attacking the northern mercantile fleet.

Long before the war was over, privateering could be evaluated, and clearly it was of minor importance. Only a handful of vessels fell victim, and these were balanced by losses of the privateers themselves. Two attempts at privateering on the west coast, the J. M. Chapman Plot and that of the Salvador Pirates resulted in capture and trials for piracy.

== See also ==
- Privateer
- Blockade runners of the American Civil War
- U.S. Supreme Court
- Prize (law)
- Letter of marque
- Colonel Michael Corcoran and the Privateer Enchantress Affair
- Piracy

== Bibliography ==
- Luraghi, Raimondo, A history of the Confederate Navy (tr. Paolo E. Coletta). Naval Institute Press, 1996. ISBN 1-55750-527-6
- Robinson, William Morrison, Jr. The Confederate privateers. Yale University, 1928. Reprint, Univ. of South Carolina, 1990.
- Scharf, J. Thomas (1887). History of the Confederate States Navy. New York: Rogers & Sherwood.
- Soley, James Russell, The blockade and the cruisers. Charles Scribner's Sons, 1883. Reprint, Blue and Gray Press, n.d.
- Tucker, Spencer C., Blue and Gray Navies: the Civil War Afloat. Annapolis: Naval Institute Press, 2006. ISBN 1-59114-882-0
- Warburton, A. F., Trial of the officers and crew of the privateer Savannah, on the charge of piracy, in the United States Circuit Court for the Southern District of New York, Hon. Judges Nelson and Shipman, presiding. Reported by A. F. Warburton, stenographer, and corrected by the counsel. Washington: Government Printing Office, 1862. Reprint, Kessinger, 2006. ISBN 1-4286-5226-4, ISBN 978-1-4286-5226-2
- Official records of the Union and Confederate Navies in the War of the Rebellion. Series I, 27 volumes; Series II, 3 volumes. Washington: Government Printing Office, 1894–1922.

== Further information ==
- Dictionary of American Naval Fighting Ships, p. 584, Appendix II. Annex I, Privateers Commissioned by the Confederate States government
- Civil War naval chronology, 1861–1865, (Government Printing Office, 1971), Appendix A.
- List of privateers and their captures.
- Illustration of encounter between USS St. Lawrence and privateer Petrel.
- Illustrated account of recapture of S. J. Waring by William Tillman.
- Illustration of privateer Savannah after capture.
