= Joshua Gardner =

Joshua Gardner is the name of:

- Joshua Gardner (sea captain) (fl. 1820), American sea captain from Nantucket and discoverer of Gardner Island
- Josh Gardner (soccer) (born 1982), American soccer player
- Josh Gardner (comedian) (born 1971), American comedian and writer
