= Tom Stern (filmmaker) =

American film director

- Born: United States
- Occupations: Film director; television director; actor; screenwriter; film producer; television producer

Tom Stern is an American actor, director, writer, producer and musician.

== Education ==
Stern grew up in Pleasantville, New York and attended Byram Hills High School in Armonk, New York, and then went to film school at Tisch School of the Arts New York University (NYU) from 1983–87, where he met Alex Winter. The two collaborated on a number of short films including Squeal of Death, which was noticed by an executive at Columbia Pictures in 1986. After graduating the pair went to Hollywood and directed IMPACT video magazine, which feature artists and performers such as Bill Hicks, Survival Research Laboratories, Public Enemy, Robert Williams, Jane's Addiction, and another short film with Butthole Surfers. [Tom Stern at IMDb]

== Hollywood ==
In 1987 Stern and Winter drove to Hollywood and sent a copy of Squeal of Death to Sam Raimi, whose film Evil Dead 2 was an inspiration to them. Raimi responded enthusiastically. He and his partner Rob Tapert optioned an anthology comedy feature film script from Stern and Winter. The pair then worked on a number of short films and music videos for bands such as Red Hot Chili Peppers and Ice Cube.

Stern and Winter teamed up with writer Tim Burns on The Idiot Box, with Stern and Winter also co-starring and co-directing.

Immediately following The Idiot Box, Stern, Winter and Burns co-wrote the 1993 film Freaked with Stern and Winter also serving as co-directors. Freaked starred Winter, Randy Quaid, Keanu Reeves, Bobcat Goldthwait and Mr. T. The film gained a cult following and in 2013 played at Cinefamily in Los Angeles in celebration of the 20th anniversary of its release.

Stern also co-wrote the screenplay to An American Werewolf in Paris, the sequel to the 1981 film An American Werewolf in London, with Burns and Anthony Waller.

Stern and Burns also collaborated on The Chimp Channel.

Stern has worked with Jimmy Kimmel's production company Jackhole Productions on shows such as Jimmy Kimmel Live!, The Man Show as segment director, and Crank Yankers as director and supervising producer. In addition, Stern appeared as an actor and worked as a writer for Trey Parker and Matt Stone's presidential parody, That's My Bush!, as co-executive producer, served as director and writer for The Andy Milonakis Show, and was one of the creators and producers of the Comedy Central travel show parody Gerhard Reinke's Wanderlust.

Stern was also writer/director/producer on a live action SpongeBob SquarePants special titled SpongeBob Appreciation Day: Patchy's Beach Bash!, starring Tom Kenny, Jon Heder, Rob Riggle, Meghan Trainor and Anthony Davis which premiered on Nickelodeon on January 4, 2020. Stern was also recently showrunner/director on two Netflix shows: Kevin Hart's Guide to Black History and The Toys That Made Us. His short film Adams, which he produced, directed and adapted from the George Saunders story, stars Patton Oswalt and Fred Armisen, and recently won Best Comedy at the HollyShorts Film Festival, where the jury included Anthony Russo and Matthew Modine. Other recent shows directed by Stern include Comedy Central's rebooted Crank Yankers, Fox's What Just Happened with Fred Savage, and Disney+'s Earth to Ned.

== Butthole Surfers: The Hole Truth and Nothing Butt ==
Starting in 2020, Stern began production on an official documentary about Texas punk band Butthole Surfers. Stern’s history with the band goes back to 1986, when he first filmed the band at CBGBs. The film was titled Butthole Surfers: The Hole Truth and Nothing Butt.

Directed and produced by Stern, the movie chronicles the history of the band and its members via use of interviews and multi-media forms such as animation and puppetry. The film features interviews with the band itself as well as fans and contemporaries such as Dave Grohl, Richard Linklater, Flea, Eric Andre, David Yow, Dean Ween, Josh Freese, and Cris Kirkwood.

The film premiered on March 12, 2025 at the Paramount Theater in Austin, Texas at SXSW 2025. The movie received overwhelmingly positive reviews and received SXSW’s Best of Texas award.

== Filmography ==
Year	Title	Director	Producer	Writer	Notes
2025	Butthole Surfers: The Hole Truth and Nothing Butt	Yes	Yes	Yes	
2024	Saving Bikini Bottom: The Sandy Cheeks Movie	No	No	Yes	
2020–2021	Earth to Ned	Yes	No	No	
2019-2021	Crank Yankers	Yes	No	No	
2017	The Toys That Made Us	Yes	No	No	
2017	Kevin Hart's Guide to Black History	Yes	No	No	
2015	2 Broke Girls	Yes	No	No	
2014	Hollywood Hillbillies	No	Executive	No	
2012	Urban Tarzan	No	Executive	No	
2012	Joe Schmo: The Full Bounty	Yes	No	No	
2012-2013	Stevie TV	Yes	Co-executive	No	
2011	Marc Saves America	Yes	Executive	No	
2010	1000 Ways to Die	No	Supervising	No	
2008	Alligator Boots	Yes	No	No	
2007	Harden High	Yes	Executive	Yes	Also creator
2007	Saul of the Mole Men	Yes	Executive	Yes	
2005	The Andy Milonakis Show	Yes	Executive	Yes	
2003	Gerhard Reinke's Wanderlust	Yes	Executive	Yes	
2003	Jimmy Kimmel Live!	Yes	No	No	
2001	That's My Bush!	No	No	Yes	
2000–2003	The Man Show	Yes	No	No	
1999	The Chimp Channel	No	Yes	Yes	
1997	An American Werewolf in Paris	No	No	Yes	
1993	Freaked	Yes	co-producer	Yes	Also actor
1991	The Idiot Box	Yes	No	Yes	Also actor
1988	Bar-B-Que Movie	Yes	Yes	Yes	
1985	Squeal of Death	Yes	Yes	Yes	Also actor

=== Music videos ===
- Butthole Surfers – "Cherub" (live at CBGB, February 12, 1986)
- Red Hot Chili Peppers – "Taste the Pain" (1990) (co-directed by Alex Winter)
- Ice Cube – "Who's the Mack" (1990) (co-directed by Alex Winter)
- Human Radio – "Me and Elvis" (1990) (co-directed by Alex Winter)
- Extreme – "Decadence Dance" (1990) (co-directed by Alex Winter)
- Marilyn Manson – "Dope Hat" (1995)
- Spork – "Naked Invasion" (1996)
- ANJ – "Gorbachev" (2008)
