= Ashley Diana Morris =

Canadian model and actress (born 1988)

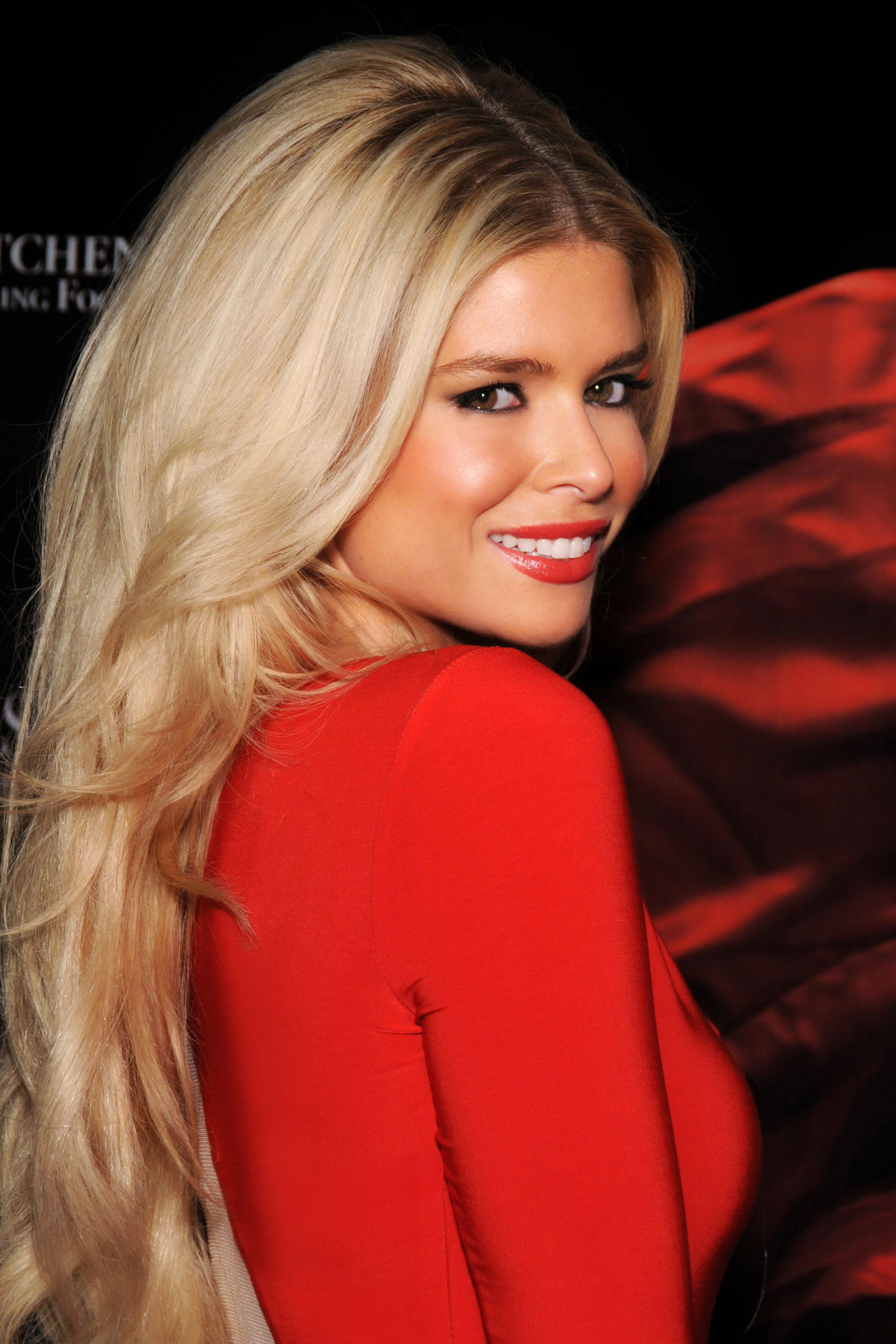
- Ashley Diana Morris, on February 8, 2014, at VIVA GLAM Magazine event
- Born: December 7, 1988 (age 37); Toronto, Ontario
- Occupations: Model, actress
- Spouse: Geoffrey Gillespie (m. 2013)
- Modeling information
- Height: 5 ft 9 in (1.75 m)
- Hair color: Blonde
- Eye color: Hazel
- Website: www.ashleydianamorris.com

Ashley Diana Morris (born December 7, 1988) is a Canadian model and actress. In 2013, she became a Guess model in Vancouver.

Morris was chosen by Hello! Magazine to represent one of the 50 Most Beautiful Stars in 2013.

In 2015, she was picked to play the role of Rebecca Romijn in the movie The Unauthorized Full House Story which aired on August 22 on the Lifetime Network.

== Personal life ==
On November 9, 2013, Morris married cosmetic dentist Geoffrey Gillespie.

According to an interview from 2013, Morris states that she holds a degree in theatre and English literature from the University of Toronto and a diploma in sports journalism from Centennial College. She also claims a role on Global TV's short-lived Canadian teen drama series The Best Years.

According to an interview from 2014, Morris broke her nose when she was younger and had her first cosmetic surgery as a repair for that break.

== Filmography ==
Film and television
Year	Title	Role	Notes
2005	Air Hockey	Blonde Fan	Video
2006	Blood Creek	Sheryl	Video
2006	Chicknapping	Thalia	Video
2006	The Smart Woman Survival Guide	Lucy	"Their Cup Runneth Over"
2007	The Best Years	Shannon Biel	Recurring role (season 1)
2014	Rush	Carey	"Because I Got High"
2014	Package Deal	Laughing Woman	"The Break Up: Part 2"
2015	The Unauthorized Full House Story	Rebecca Romijn	TV film
2016	Love on the Sidelines	Hunter St. James	TV film
2017	The Arrangement	Emily Coolidge	"Pilot"
