= Butthole Surfers: The Hole Truth and Nothing Butt =

2025 documentary film about Butthole Surfers

- Film poster
- Directed by: Tom Stern
- Produced by: Noa Durban; Scott Evans; Neil Fellah; Derrick Rossi; Tom Stern
- Cinematography: Alex Poppas; Jim Saah
- Edited by: Scott Evans; Nick Ferrell
- Production company: The Hole Truth
- Distributed by: Alamo Exclusives
- Release dates: March 12, 2025 (SXSW); August 28, 2026 (United States)
- Running time: 106 minutes
- Country: United States
- Language: English

Butthole Surfers: The Hole Truth and Nothing Butt is a 2025 American documentary film directed by Tom Stern about the experimental rock band Butthole Surfers.

The film premiered at the South by Southwest (SXSW) festival in Austin, Texas, on March 12, 2025. It chronicles the band's history and cultural impact through interviews, archival footage, and multimedia elements.

== Synopsis ==
The documentary explores the origins, development, and legacy of the Butthole Surfers, focusing on the creative partnership between core members Gibby Haynes and Paul Leary. It incorporates archival footage, animation, and interviews with band members and collaborators.

== Production ==
The film was directed by Tom Stern, a longtime collaborator of the band. In 2021, a Kickstarter campaign was launched to help fund the film. It successfully surpassed its $50,000 goal in the first couple of days.

== Release ==
The Hole Truth and Nothing Butt premiered at the 2025 South by Southwest Film & TV Festival. It also screened at the Doc'n Roll Film Festival. In July 2026, Alamo Drafthouse Cinema announced the launch of a new distribution label named Alamo Exclusives, with Butthole Surfers: The Hole Truth and Nothing Butt serving as its maiden release; the film is scheduled for a US theatrical release exclusively at Alamo Drafthouse locations on August 28, 2026. Sumerian Pictures acquired North American rights shortly before the film's theatrical run.

== Reception ==
A review in The Daily Texan described the film as "wild, riveting, emotional".
