= Unbelievable!!!!! =

2020 American parody film

- Film poster
- Directed by: Steven L. Fawcette
- Written by: Steven L. Fawcette
- Produced by: Snoop Dogg; Angelique Fawcette; Steven L. Fawcette
- Cinematography: Thor Wixom
- Edited by: Stevie Waichulis
- Music by: Gerald Fried
- Production company: Archangel Films LA
- Distributed by: Indie Rights
- Release dates: September 16, 2016 (Los Angeles); August 1, 2020 (Online)
- Country: United States
- Language: English
- Budget: $3,750,000 (estimated)

Unbelievable!!!!! is a 2016 American film written and directed by Steven L. Fawcette, which parodies Star Trek. The film stars over forty Star Trek cast members and follows the exploits of four astronauts (one of whom is a marionette) on a rescue mission to the Moon that does not go as planned.

It was Nichelle Nichols's final film role.

== Summary ==
Unbelievable!!!!! follows the exploits of four off-beat astronauts (one of whom is a marionette) who travel on a rescue mission to the Moon. However, the people they find at the Lunar Base are not who they appear to be. The astronauts then find themselves trying to save the Earth from an alien invasion.

== Cast ==
- Snoop Dogg as Major LeGrande Bushe
- Garrett Wang as Dr. Charles Hunter
- Chase Masterson as Captain Connie Garrison / Natasha
- Tim Russ as Dr. Robert Schmitt
- Kevin Carlson as Captain Kirk Stillwood (voice)
- Nichelle Nichols as Sensei / Aunt Petunia
- Robert Picardo as Boris / Award Show Presenter / Dr. Nontu Soon
- Marina Sirtis as Award Show Presenter
- Michael Dorn as Dr. Deystrum
- Nana Visitor as Dr. Samantha Stamen
- Walter Koenig as Fireman Frank
- Linda Park as Amber Earhardt
- Connor Trinneer as Captain Jack Youngblood
- Michael Madsen as President Ben Dover
- Robert Davi as The Gardener of Frickin' Forever (voice)
- Manu Intiraymi as Private Durwood
- Angelique Fawcette as Lynn Hastings / Afro Agent / Nurse Uri / Don Gornelius Jr. / Nay Nay / Tay Tay / Cow / Dodo The 'Big Bang' Bean (voice)
- Katarina Van Derham as Captain Cheryl Stillwood
- Dina Meyer as Female Moesha
- Olivia d'Abo as Female Larrisha
- Julie Warner as Female Curlisha
- Armin Shimerman as Male Moesha
- Jeffrey Combs as Male Larrisha
- John Billingsley as Male Curlisha
- Dominic Keating as Hacky
- Max Grodénchik as Paramedic Yacky
- Casey Biggs as Detective Dan Marr
- Brenda Bakke as Nurse Christine Choppel
- Patti Yasutake as Dr. Beverly Krasher
- McKenzie Westmore as herself
- Gilbert Gottfried as himself
- Anthony Montgomery as The Launchman
- Vaughn Armstrong as Russell Sprout
- Gary Graham as Neil Downe
- Steve Rankin as Dr. Len McCoyy
- Michael Dante as Michael Dante
- Jack Donner as Jack Donner
- Michael Forest as Michael Forest
- Sean Kenney as Sean Kenney
- Gary Lockwood as Gary Lockwood
- Steven Scot Bono as Buzz The Pothead

== Release ==
The film had its world premiere on September 7, 2016, at Grauman's Chinese Theatre in Los Angeles. Domestic distribution rights were acquired in June 2020 by Indie Rights. The online premiere of the movie occurred on August 1, 2020.
