= George F. Pearson =

United States Navy admiral (1799–1867)

Rear Admiral George Frederick Pearson
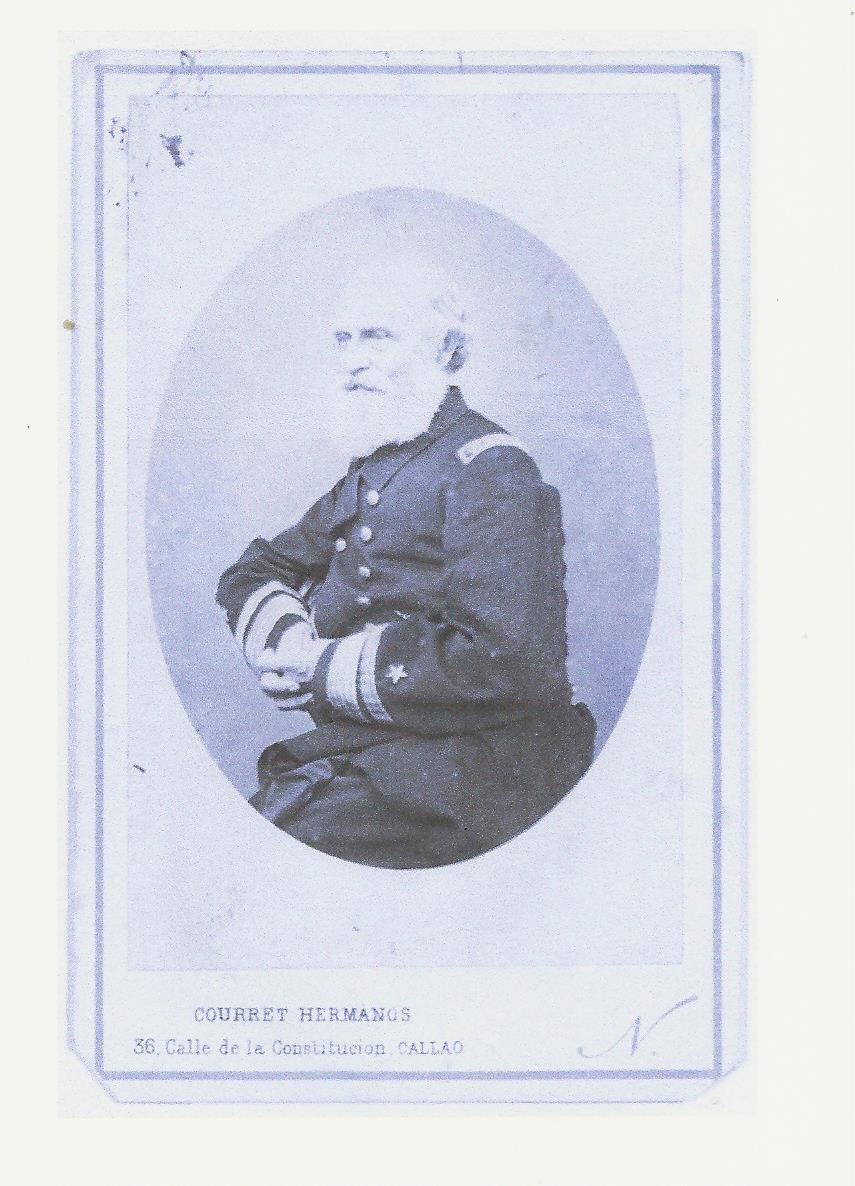
- An 1866 photograph taken by Courret Hermanos of 36 Calle De La Constitucion, Callao, Peru.
- Born: 1799; Portsmouth, New Hampshire
- Died: 1867 (aged 67–68); Portsmouth, New Hampshire
- Burial place: Arlington National Cemetery
- Military career
- Allegiance: United States
- Branch: United States Navy
- Service years: 1815–1866
- Rank: Rear admiral
- Commands: Boston; Pacific Squadron
- Conflicts: Second Seminole War; Mexican–American War; American Civil War

George Frederick Pearson (1799 – July 1, 1867) was rear-admiral of the United States Navy, commanding the Pacific Squadron during the later part of the American Civil War.

== Early life and career ==
George F. Pearson was born in Portsmouth, New Hampshire, in 1799 but lived most of his life in Massachusetts. He entered the U.S. Navy on March 11, 1815, as a midshipman, and his first ship was the frigate United States. In 1820 Midshipman Pearson served on the ship of the line Independence. In 1822 he was on the ship of the line Franklin and passed for promotion at the West Indies station.

Pearson was commissioned lieutenant on January 13, 1825, and was given duty on the West Indies station. Lt. Pearson's assignment was on the schooner Porpoise in the Mediterranean in 1826. In 1828, he was with the Mediterranean Squadron on the sloop-of-war Ontario. In 1829 he took a leave of absence which lasted until 1831 when he joined the sloop of war Boston on the Mediterranean Station. From 1832 to 1836, he was again on leave, or waiting for orders or stationed as Ordinary at Boston until he was assigned to the Constellation the flagship for Commodore Alexander Dallas of the West Indies Squadron, where it conducted operations supporting the Second Seminole War.

Pearson was promoted to commander on September 8, 1841. After the sloop of war Boston completed repairs it set sail from New York under the command of Commander Pearson on November 7, 1846, to join the Home Squadron blockading the eastern coast of Mexico. Eight days out of port, Boston ran aground on Eleuthera Island in the Bahamas after encountering a storm. Boston was wrecked beyond salvage, but her entire crew survived the disaster.

On September 14, 1855, Pearson was promoted to captain. In 1860 Person was given command of the Portsmouth Naval Shipyard in Kittery, Maine.

== Civil War ==
On December 21, 1861, Captain Pearson was put on the retired list, but continued in command of the Portsmouth Naval Yard, being promoted to commodore on the retired list, July 16, 1862.

On October 4, 1864, Commodore Pearson was given command of the Pacific Squadron, serving at that post from 1864 to 1866 as Acting Rear Admiral aboard his flagship Lancaster. Under his command Commander Henry Kallock Davenport suppressed the so-called Salvador Pirates, a Confederate Navy plot to capture one of the two Panama Railroad steamships and turn it into a Confederate commerce raider to capture a gold-laden Pacific Steamship Company vessel.

His squadron continued to protect American lives and property in Mexico and became in the same mission in Peru, defending them from attack by either side both during the Spanish blockade during the Peruvian War with Spain.

== Later life ==
After the Civil War ended in May 1865, Pearson's Pacific Squadron had to deal with the CSS Shenandoah. Its captain, unaware of war's end, was attacking American whaling ships in the North Pacific as late as August 1865.

From 1866 to 1869 the Pacific Squadron was split into North and South Pacific Squadrons. Pearson served as South Pacific Squadron's first commander, as rear admiral in command of the South Pacific Squadron being promoted to rear admiral on Retired List, July 25, 1866. His squadron continued to be involved in protecting American interests in Panama and the Pacific coast of South America due to the ongoing war by Peru, Ecuador and Chile with Spain.

After being relieved of duty in the Pacific, he returned to Portsmouth, New Hampshire, where he died, July 1, 1867, at the age of 68.
