= Svetlana (TV series) =

- Genre: Comedy
- Created by: Iris Bahr
- Starring: Iris Bahr; Alex Veadov; Irina Voronina; Angela Gots; Katia Hayes
- Country of origin: United States
- Original languages: English; Russian
- No. of seasons: 2
- No. of episodes: 24

Production
- Executive producer: Iris Bahr
- Running time: 21–27 minutes

Original release
- Network: HDNet
- Release: May 27, 2010 – July 13, 2011

Svetlana is a comedy series starring comedian Iris Bahr. It premiered on HDNet on May 27, 2010 and ran for two seasons.

== Plot ==
Svetlana Maximovskaya (Iris Bahr) is a woman of indeterminate age who arrived in Minnesota from the former Soviet Union as a mail-order bride. After leaving her husband Steve, she moves to Los Angeles and opens a brothel in a suburban home, the "St. Petersburg House of Discreet Pleasure".

== Cast ==
- Iris Bahr as Svetlana Maximovskaya
- Alex Veadov as Vlad
- Angela Gots as Marina
- Irina Voronina as Natasha
- Katia Hayes as Anya
- Laura Napoli as Robin Riker

== Series overview ==
Season	Episodes	Originally released	
Season	Episodes	First released	Last released
1	12	May 27, 2010	August 12, 2010
2	12	April 27, 2011	July 13, 2011

== Episodes ==
=== Season 1 (2010) ===
No.	Title	Original release date
1	"Yellowcake"	May 27, 2010
After a client (former Iranian President Mahmoud Ahmadinejad) leaves behind a briefcase full of uranium powder known as yellowcake, Svetlana must decide on the best way to get rid of it.
2	"Gumption"	June 3, 2010
Svetlana scrambles to interview and hire a new driver when her regular chauffeur quits.
3	"Wish Fulfillment"	June 10, 2010
When Natasha expresses a desire to sleep with a black man, Svetlana attempts to lure one—with the help of some creative derriere augmentation.
4	"Recession Special"	June 17, 2010
The Saint Petersburg House of Discreet Pleasure drops prices to attract recession-crippled customers—a move that yields unexpected turmoil.
5	"Sex Faces"	June 24, 2010
Vlad applies for a job at an engineering laboratory, despite having a mostly hypothetical resumé. Meanwhile, Svetlana explores the benefits of botox injections.
6	"Ointment"	July 1, 2010
Svetlana tries to avoid deportation after Steve annuls their marriage. Meanwhile, the family sets up shop in an occupied house.
7	"You're Svencome"	July 8, 2010
The current resident of the house that the family has fashioned into a brothel isn't thrilled about his unwanted boarders, so Svetlana hatches a plan to extend their stay.
8	"Crystal Methdown"	July 15, 2010
Vlad struggles with going to his first day at work while Svetlana supports Natasha's audition for a movie role. When an American girl wants to join the brothel as a prostitute Natasha must compete in a "Funtastic Fuckdown" contest.
9	"Good Friggin Shabbes"	July 22, 2010
Svetlana's son Boris has been expelled from five schools due to misconduct so far. To avoid him being put into foster care, she desperately tries to get him into a Yeshiva school by pretending to be Jewish. Meanwhile, Marina's feelings for a Lesbian named Liam come to light, when she feels rejected and seeks revenge.
10	"Eco-Shlong"	July 29, 2010
Svetlana receives a call from Michelle Obama personally asking her to make her business more energy conscious. The enterprising Svetlana decides that her brothel, St. Petersburg House of Discreet Pleasure, will invent an ecologically friendly dildo and humor ensues.
11	"Throw Mama Back on the Plane"	August 5, 2010
Svetlana's aging mother pays a surprise visit from the old country with a seemingly impossible request.
12	"Snatchengil for the Stars"	August 12, 2010
Svetlana becomes extremely jealous when she observes Vlad dancing with an attractive female acquaintance at her class. Meanwhile, Eddie resorts to drastic measures when Svetlana's old chauffeur asks for his job back.

=== Season 2 (2011) ===
No.	Title	Original release date
1	"Me Love You Decent Amount of Time"	April 27, 2011
An Asian brothel opens in the immediate neighborhood and draws many of Svetlana's clients away. While Svetlana fights back, her gay friend Jared investigates Vlad to determine his true sexual orientation.
2	"Narnia"	May 4, 2011
After Eddie frames Svetlana for Phil's murder, she faces "five to life" in prison—and has trouble readjusting to civilian life after she's paroled. (Note: This episode ends with a music video entitled "Hos Before Bros," featuring music by Keith Atkins and lyrics by Kyle Perzanoski.)
3	"Water-Board Certified"	May 11, 2011
Vlad is abducted by government officials and waterboarded while Svetlana tries to get rid of a negligible amount of belly weight gain.
4	"Amerimorphation"	May 18, 2011
Svetlana pretends to be an all-American in order to become part of a documentary on American entrepreneurs.
5	"Corkage Fee"	May 25, 2011
Svetlana turns to a plastic surgeon after her previous breast augmentation suffers a rupture. Meanwhile, Vlad makes a disastrous attempt at male prostitution. (Note: This episode features Iris Bahr in a secondary role as Sandy, a snide receptionist.)
6	"Mom! Dad!"	June 1, 2011
Liam's disapproving parents threaten to ruin her wedding to Marina, which Svetlana is busy trying to organize.
7	"Milking It"	June 8, 2011
When Natasha expresses a desire to adopt a baby, Svetlana calls in a favor and arranges to have a Haitian infant delivered to the house. However, when Tomas arrives, he isn't exactly what Svetlana was anticipating.
8	"Outta Here Like Vladimir: Part 1 "Cookies and Cream""	June 15, 2011
While taking out the trash, Vlad meets a pretty neighbor, Phoebe (Wendi McLendon-Covey), and immediately dumps Svetlana for her.
9	"Outta Here Like Vladimir: Part II "URF""	June 22, 2011
Svetlana, in despair, marries Vivek, an Indian man, and is trying everything to become a good housewife. Meanwhile, Vlad finds it harder and harder to cope with his new girlfriend's nymphomaniacal tendencies.
10	"Yearning for Zionism"	June 29, 2011
Svetlana tries to prevent Vlad from pimping Natasha on the streets in the middle of the night—and ends up brainwashed by a religious cult.
11	"Bringing Up Baby"	July 6, 2011
When Marina and Liam announce their desire for a baby, Svetlana goes looking for a suitable sperm donor.
12	"Look It!"	July 13, 2011
An exterminator contaminates the brothel with poison spray and the family goes on their first ever camping trip to get fresh air.
