= Irina Voronina =

Russian-American model, comedian, and actress (born 1977)

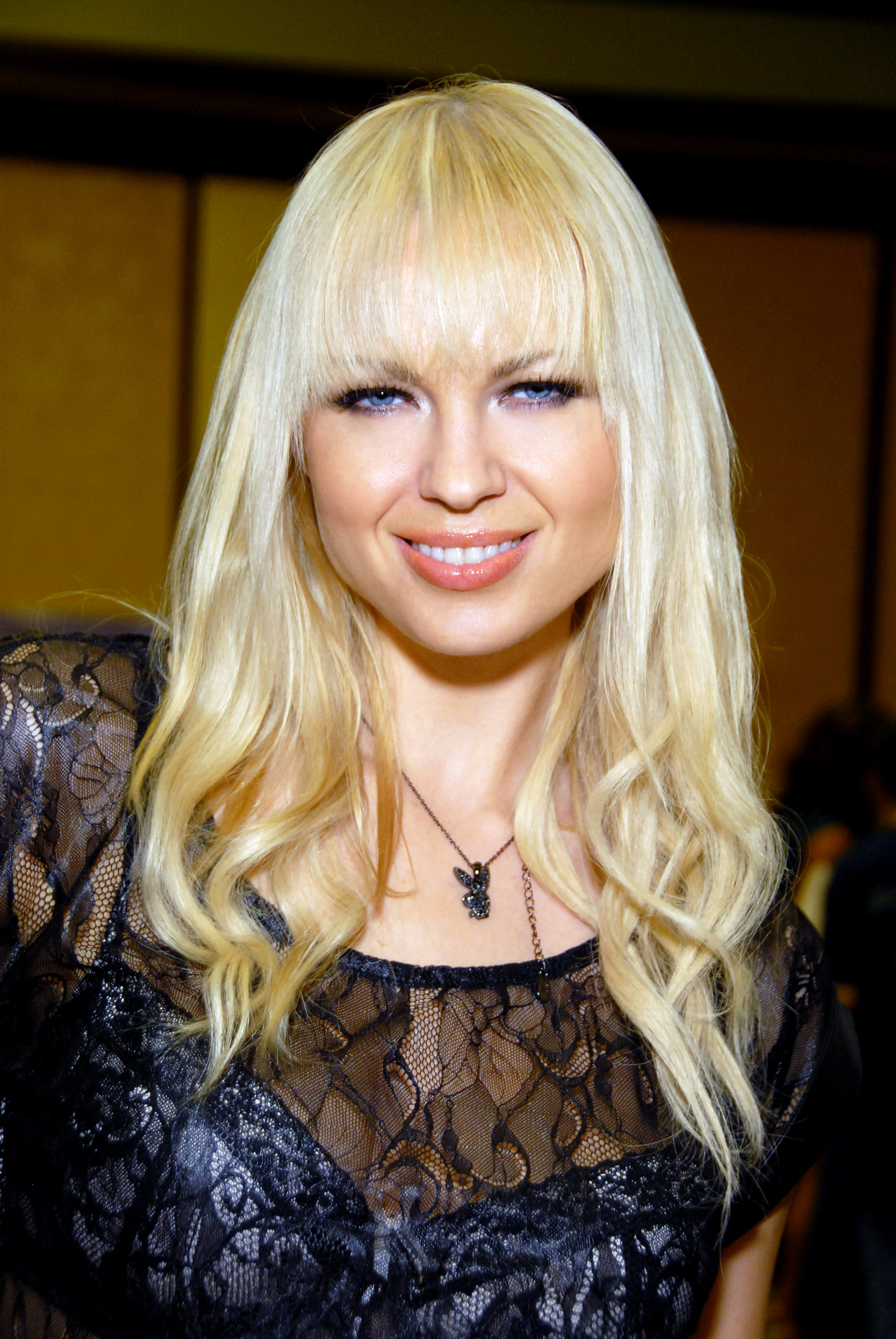
- Voronina in 2011

Playboy centerfold appearance
- January 2001
- Preceded by: Cara Michelle
- Succeeded by: Lauren Michelle Hill

Personal details
- Born: 1977 (age 48–49) Dzerzhinsk, Russia

Irina Voronina (born 1977) is a Russian-American model, comedian, and actress. Born in Dzerzhinsk in Russia, she moved to Los Angeles in summer 1999 and posed for several magazines including Playboy, who made her Playboy Playmate of the month for January 2001.

She acted in multiple films and TV series and spent a year on tour as 2008's St. Pauli Girl Beer spokesmodel. Voronina began a career as a stand-up comedian in early 2015 and subsequently published a comedy album, From Russia With Laughs.

== Biography ==
=== Early life ===
Voronina was born in Dzerzhinsk in 1977. She worked for some years in her home country as a photographer and ball decorator and spent time living in Switzerland, Germany, Madrid, and Milan. She subsequently moved from the last of these to Los Angeles in summer 1999 and subsequently became a US citizen.

=== Career ===
While in Los Angeles, she posed for Perfect 10 and for Playboy; the latter made her Playmate of the Month in January 2001, for which she posed nude. Her centerfold was photographed by Arny Freytag. She subsequently spent time living in the Playboy Mansion, a house in Holmby Hills in Los Angeles owned by Playboy's founder Hugh Hefner.

In May 2005, she was photographed topless by Las Vegas mayor Oscar Goodman in the suite of the Palms Casino Resort in Las Vegas, which appeared in Playboy Cyber Club. Goodman's pictorial annoyed the then-Nevada Republican Party vice chair Richard Ziser, who demanded his resignation. In December 2010, Voronina and Brazilian model Sasckya Porto featured in a Tron: Legacy inspired photoshoot for Playboy. Photographed by Jared Ryder and filmed in Miami, Game On featured the pair nude and painted blue and orange. She also modelled for Maxim, Ocean, Shape, Knockout, and the Australian edition of People.

Voronina appeared in two episodes of the first season of HBO's Entourage in 2004. She has stated that she was fired from the show for standing up to sexual harassment from the cast. In 2007, Voronina appeared as Fallopia in several episodes of the Adult Swim show Saul of the Mole Men. That year, she played a bailiff on DirecTV's Supreme Court of Comedy, a show in which comedians judged real-life disputes. By November 2009, she had appeared on the TV series Jimmy Kimmel Live!, Chelsea Lately, Howard Stern on Demand, Mad TV, and Punk'd and in the films Reno 911!: Miami, Epic Movie, and Balls of Fury, and had filmed for Svetlana. She also acted in the indie film Scramble and in Killing Hasselhoff.

Voronina spent 2008 on a PR tour as that year's St. Pauli Girl Beer spokesmodel. As part of the campaign, she rang the bell at the New York Stock Exchange. By November 2009, she had advertised Michelob Ultra, SKYY vodka, and Miller Lite. In November 2009, it was announced that she had been booked for a Mötley Crüe video. She then appeared in the music video for the 2014 Fozzy track "Do You Want to Start a War". She began performing stand-up comedy in early 2015 and subsequently published the comedy album From Russia With Laughs. By 2017, she was performing stand-up comedy several times a month in Los Angeles.

=== Image misappropriation allegations ===
Since 2015, she has regularly been named as a plaintiff in class action lawsuits alleging the misappropriation of her image. These include a strip club in Long Island in New York in October 2015; a strip club in Tampa in Florida in November 2016; a strip club in San Antonio in Texas in April 2017; three strip clubs in northeast Ohio in September 2018; a nightclub in Wichita Falls in Texas in February 2019; a nightclub in Springfield in Massachusetts in July 2019; a gentlemen's club in Colonie in New York in January 2020; a strip club in Houston in February 2021; various clubs in Florida in October 2021; two clubs in Philadelphia in October 2022; a swinger's club in Portland in Oregon in August 2023; and another strip club in San Antonio in November 2024. According to the last of these, she had been Kandy magazine's Model of the Year in 2013 and had modelled for Playboy in 20 countries.

== Filmography ==
=== Film ===
Year	Title	Role
2002	Big Shot: Confessions of a Campus Bookie	Dancer
2003	Graduation Night	Bootylicious
2004	Ring of Darkness	Amethyst
2006	Hood of Horror	Slank
2007	Epic Movie	Jogging Girl
2007	Reno 911!: Miami	Russian Model
2007	7-10 Split	Lady Luck
2007	Balls of Fury	Coach Schmidt
2007	Towelhead	"Snow Queen" Centerfold
2011	Hollywoo	Gruth
2012	Piranha 3DD	Kiki
2015	Lazer Team	Beautiful Scientist
2015	Bob Thunder: Internet Assassin	Bikini girl
2017	Scramble	V
2017	Killing Hasselhoff	Model at Party

=== Television ===
Year	Series	Episode(s)	Role
2004	Entourage	"Talk Show"	Ring Girl
2004	Entourage	"Date Night"	Sexy Clubgoer
2007	Saul of the Mole Men	Multiple	Fallopia
2008	Supreme Court of Comedy	Multiple	Bailiff
2009	Reno 911!	"Dangle's Murder Mystery: Part 2"	Russian Sexpot
2020	Reno 911!	"Cellphone Awareness Training"	Buxom Witness
2010	iCarly	"iSell Penny Tees"	Krustacia
2010	Svetlana	Multiple	Natasha
2017	Tosh.0	"Golf Fight"	Bride
2018	13 Reasons Why	"The Chalk Machine"	Ivanka
2019	Laugh After Dark	"Granison Crawford & Irina Voronina"	Herself
2020	Laugh Tonight With Damon Williams	"Laugh Tonight Be Serious Tomorrow"	Herself
2025	Rosie Tran Presents...	"International 2"	Herself

Irina Voronina	Lauren Michelle Hill	Miriam Gonzalez	Katie Lohmann	Crista Nicole	Heather Spytek
Kimberley Stanfield	Jennifer Walcott	Dalene Kurtis	Stephanie Heinrich	Lindsey Vuolo	Shanna Moakler
