= Katarina Van Derham =

Slovak-American model, actress, publisher and entrepreneur

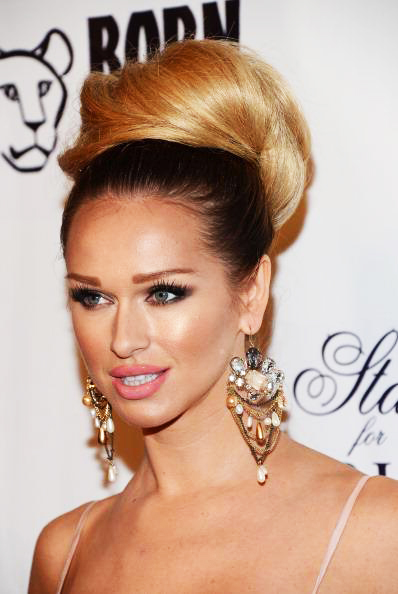
- Born: Katarina Ambrusova; 11 December 1975 (age 50); Ľubochňa, Czechoslovakia (now Slovakia)
- Education: Stredna Priemyselna Skola Textilna, Oxford University
- Occupations: Actress, model, publisher, entrepreneur
- Years active: 2002–present
- Spouse: James Michael Bilella (2001–2008, divorced)

Katarina Van Derham (born Katarina Ambrusova on 11 December 1975) is a Slovak-American model, actress, publisher and entrepreneur. Van Derham is best known for playing Bob Saget's girlfriend on the TV show Entourage and being the founder of Viva Glam magazine. As a model and actress, Van Derham has appeared on the cover of over 60 magazines worldwide and has been profiled on hundreds of major media outlets including CNN, Fox, and NBC. As an entrepreneur, she has been profiled in Forbes, She Media, and Business Rockstars. She has appeared in 17 national and international TV commercials for brands such as Pepsi, Nike, Dodge Ram, and Coors Light, as well as in music videos for international stars such as Dorothy, Tito Jackson and Andy Madadian. Most recently, she acted in the movie Unbelievable!!!!!, the seven-time award-winning movie Crypto Heads, and Team Havnaa.

== Early life ==
Van Derham was born in Slovakia. She had one brother, who died in 2019. Van Derham came to the United States in 1998 at the age of 22 with only $500 in her pocket. Van Derham has been a vegan or vegetarian since she was 18.

In 1998 Van Derham was briefly married to Deja Haba, and later married Los Angeles native James Michael Bilella. They divorced in 2008. She has been in the public eye for her relationships, notably with rockstars Tommy Lee and DJ Ashba.

== Modeling ==
Van Derham's modeling career started in 2002, at the age of 26, when she was discovered by a photographer while working as a waitress in Santa Monica. The following year she was named the "Fresh Face" by Femme Fatales magazine. Van Derham has appeared in over 20 national and international print and TV commercials and over 60 magazine front covers. She has also been a spokesmodel for a number of products. Van Derham was the longest-serving St. Pauli Girl with her two-year reign. She was initially chosen using a reader's poll on the Maxim website in 2009. Van Derham also played the Snow Queen in advertisements for Coors beer. She has been voted one of the 100 sexiest women in the world by magazines on three different continents.

== Acting ==
Van Derham played Bob Saget's girlfriend in the Entourage episode "No More Drama". She also appeared in the movies Redline, Crypto Heads and Unbelievable!!!!!, portraying Captain Cheryl Stillwood. This year, she can be seen in the upcoming release Team Havnaa.

== Viva Glam Magazine ==
In 2012, Van Derham founded Viva Glam, an online magazine. Its content includes articles on fashion, beauty, wellness, travel, entertainment, and food. Viva Glam supports a vegan lifestyle. It is inspired by classic glamour and old Hollywood, but with an emphasis on modern conscious living. By September 2016, Viva Glam had 4.5 million views a month.

Viva Glam received its first significant news coverage in 2012 when it gave its Sexiest Power Woman of All Time award to model manager Nadja Atwal. In the summer of 2013, the magazine released its first print issue with Canadian Guess model Ashley Diana Morris on the cover. It was the first official cover and the issue was free.

The 90s Girl is a docu-series produced by Viva Glam. It is an intimate look into Van Derham's life and the lives of the Viva Glam team. It airs Wednesdays on the magazine's website and YouTube. The average airtime is 20 minutes. The show premiered in 2017, and as of that year eight episodes had been released.

In 2018, Van Derham started producing a web series called Models Talk, which is hosted by Candace Kita and Van Derham.

== Cosmetics ==
Katarina Van Derham launched the Glamour Garden Limited Edition liquid lipstick collection on February 1, 2018. She teamed up with cosmetic brand LA Splash to create a four-color liquid lipstick collection made up of original colors. The four colors included in Van Derham's collection are: Fashioniser, a classic nude, 90s Girl, a dusty rose, Katarina – a peachy-pink – and Glamarella, a hot fuchsia lip color. She also sells a line of false lashes, Kat Lash.

== Filmography ==
=== Film ===
Year	Title	Role	Notes
2020	Unbelievable!!!!!	Captain Cheryl Stillwood	
2021	Crypto Heads	Kat	
2024	Havnaa	American TV Reporter	

=== Television ===
Year	Title	Role	Notes
2006	Monk	Video Vixen	Episode: "Mr. Monk Goes to the Dentist"
2009	Entourage	Bob Saget's girlfriend	Episode: "No More Drama"
2009	Sports Soup	St. Pauli Girl	Episode: "Best of Sports Soup"
2013	Kendra on Top	Herself	Episode: "The Confidence Game"
2015	Leah Remini: It's All Relative	Herself	Episode: "The Camera Doesn't Lie"
2017–2018	The 90s Girl	Herself	Series regular; Online docu-series
2018–2019	Models Talk	Herself	Series regular; Online web series
