= St. Pauli Girl =

Beer brand

St Pauli Girl
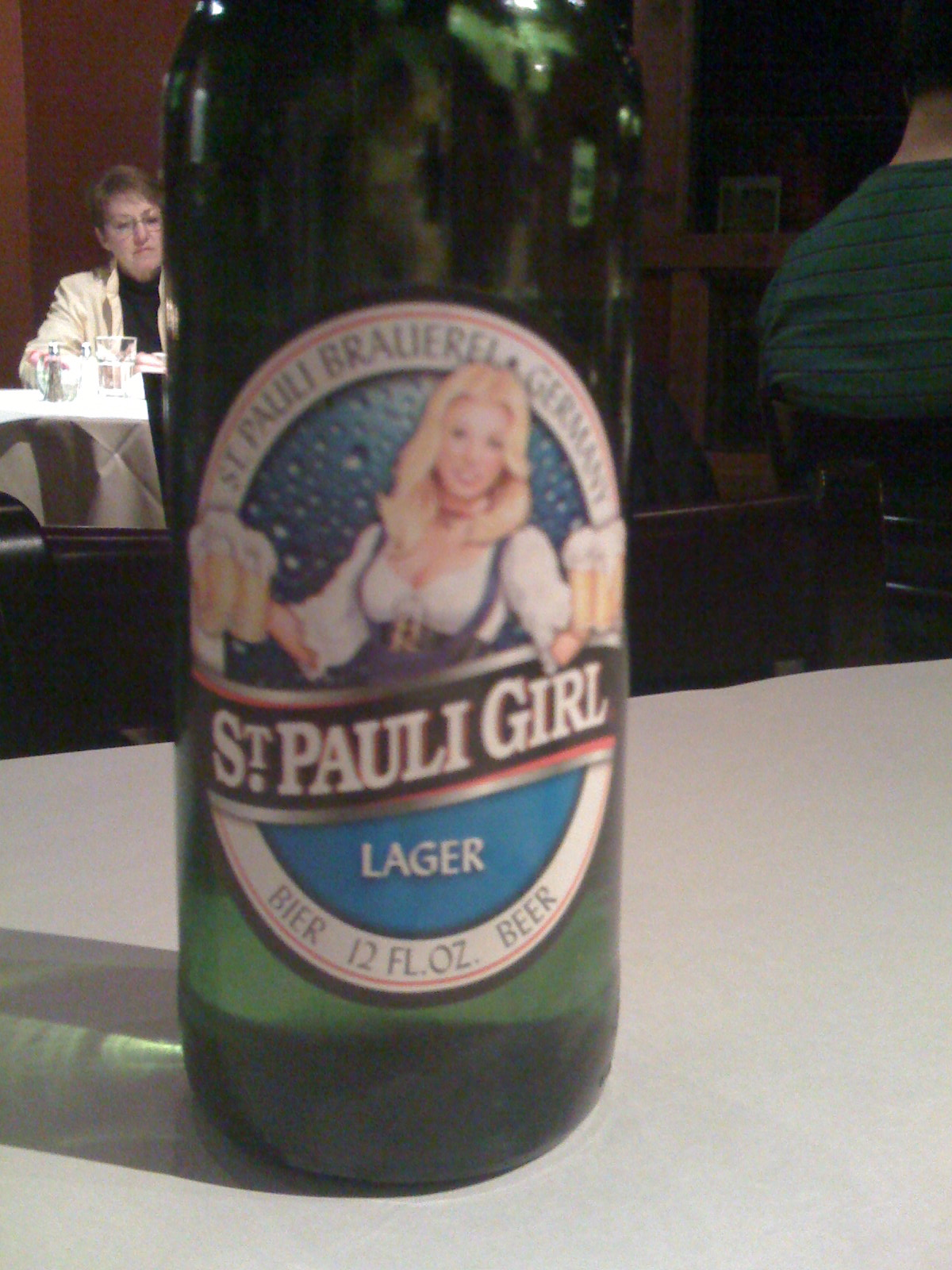
- A St. Pauli Girl beer bottle in 2008
- Location: Bremen, Germany

Active beers
| Name | Type |
| St Pauli Girl Lager | Pilsner |
| St Pauli Girl Special Dark | Dark lager |
| St Pauli Girl NA | Non-Alcoholic |

St. Pauli Girl is a brand of beer brewed and bottled for export only by the St. Pauli Brauerei, which is located within the Beck's brewery in Bremen, Germany and owned by AB InBev. In the U.S. it is brewed for the domestic market by St. Louis, Missouri-based AB InBev subsidiary Anheuser-Busch.

There are currently three brands of beer brewed: St. Pauli Girl Lager, a pale lager, St. Pauli Girl Special Dark, and St. Pauli Non-Alcoholic Malt Beverage. The beer is only produced for export and is not sold in Germany.

== History ==
The beer's name comes from the former St. Paul's Friary in Bremen, which was next to the original St. Pauli brewery established in 1857 by Lüder Rutenberg.

St Pauli Girl's Beers were first introduced into select US markets in 1965. National Distribution began in 1975. St. Pauli Non-Alcoholic was first sold in the United States in 1991. The St Pauli Girl website claims that their beer is the number two selling German beer in the United States. Per the label on the bottle, it is a product of the US, brewed by St. Louis-based Anheuser-Busch in one or more of its domestic facilities.

== Marketing ==
The distinctive label depicting a woman wearing a dirndl was introduced in the 19th century with the advent of the bottled beer. The local artist commissioned for the label drew his inspiration from the waitresses at the time.

Starting in 1977 St. Pauli Girl Beer began choosing a model to represent the beer brand nationally on an annual basis and appear on the popular St. Pauli Girl poster. During that time period, several years did not have a named spokesmodel (1978-1981, 1988, 1992, and 1994). The spokesmodel campaign ended after 2012.

=== St Pauli Girl's spokesmodels timelines ===
- 1977 The first year of St Pauli Girl's Spokesmodel campaign
- 1982 The first year of the St Pauli Girl's spokesmodel campaign beginning uninterrupted through 1987
- 1983
- 1984 Gail Star Smith
- 1985
- 1986
- 1987
- 1989 Jennifer Fabello
- 1990 Felice Schachter
- 1991 Katie Vogt
- 1993
- 1995
- 1996
- 1997
- 1998 Teresa Politi
- 1999 Playboy magazine's Playmate of the month January 1999 Jaime Bergman
- 2000 Playboy magazine's Playmate of the month August 1998 Angela Little
- 2001 Playboy magazine's Playmate of the month March 1994 Neriah Davis
- 2002 Playboy magazine's Playmate of the month January 1998 Heather Kozar
- 2003 Playboy magazine's Playmate of the month July 1998 Lisa Dergan
- 2004 Icelandic model and actress Berglind Icey
- 2005 Playboy magazine's Playmate of the month February 1999 Stacy Fuson
- 2006 model Brittany Evans
- 2007 model and actress Bobbi Sue Luther
- 2008 Playboy magazine's Playmate of the month January 2001 Irina Voronina
- 2009 Slovak model Katarina Van Derham
- 2010 Slovak model Katarina Van Derham
- 2011 American model/actress Jen England
