= The Unauthorized Full House Story =

- Television release poster
- Written by: Ron McGee
- Directed by: Brian K. Roberts
- Starring: Garrett Brawith; Justin Mader; Justin Gaston; Stephanie Bennett; Brittney Wilson; Shelby Armstrong; Mackenzie Porter; Jordyn Ashley Olson; Dakota Guppy; Juliana Wimbles; Ali Liebert; Matthew Kevin Anderson; Peter DeLuise
- Composers: Brent Belke; Craig Northey
- Countries of origin: United States; Canada
- Original language: English

Production
- Producer: Harvey Kahn
- Cinematography: C. Kim Miles
- Editor: James Ilecic
- Running time: 88 minutes
- Production companies: Bay Road Productions; Front Street Pictures

Original release
- Network: Lifetime
- Release: August 22, 2015

The Unauthorized Full House Story is a 2015 American television drama film directed by Brian K. Roberts and written by Ron McGee. It follows the behind-the-scenes making of the sitcom Full House. It stars Garrett Brawith, Justin Mader, Justin Gaston, Stephanie Bennett, Shelby Armstrong, Brittney Wilson, and Dakota Guppy. It premiered on Lifetime on August 22, 2015, drawing 1.6 million viewers.

== Plot ==
The behind-the-scenes story of the television show Full House. It begins in 1985, with Bob Saget and Dave Coulier as struggling comedians, with John Stamos as a former heartthrob having recently played Blackie Parrish on General Hospital, all eventually accepting roles for Jeff Franklin's new family sitcom. As the show progresses, Bob becomes disillusioned with the show not reflecting his raunchier style of comedy, but he also accepts a role as the host of America's Funniest Home Videos, which puts a strain on his home life. The Olsen twins' mother, Jarnett, is concerned with her twins being in show business, especially when they become the breakout stars of the show. Bob and Dave both lose a sister, and Jeff eventually leaves the show to focus on his new show Hanging with Mr. Cooper, and the show comes to an end in 1995, after eight seasons. The film ends with the cast reuniting at Candace Cameron-Bure's wedding.

== Cast ==
- Garrett Brawith as Bob Saget
- Justin Mader as Dave Coulier
- Justin Gaston as John Stamos
- Stephanie Bennett as Lori Loughlin
- Brittney Wilson as Older Candace Cameron
- Shelby Armstrong as Younger Candace Cameron
- Mackenzie Porter as Jarnette Olsen
- Jordyn Ashley Olson as Older Jodie Sweetin
- Dakota Guppy as Younger Jodie Sweetin
- Juliana Wimbles as Sherri Kramer
- Ali Liebert as Gay Saget
- Matthew Kevin Anderson as Jeff Franklin
- Peter DeLuise as Bill Stamos
- Blaise Todd as Toddler Mary-Kate Olsen
- Kinslea Todd as Toddler Ashley Olsen
- Calla Jones as Mary-Kate Olsen Age 6
- Tyla Jones as Ashley Olsen Age 6
- Kylie Armstrong as Mary-Kate Olsen Age 9
- Jordan Armstrong as Ashley Olsen Age 9
- Jaime Schneider as Older Andrea Barber
- Aislyn Watson as Younger Andrea Barber
- Ashley Diana Morris as Rebecca Romijn
