= Jefferson Davis (privateer) =

Ship

History

Confederate States
- Name: Jefferson Davis
- Namesake: Jefferson Davis
- Fate: Stranded in St. Augustine, Florida.

General characteristics
- Tonnage: 187
- Armament: 2 × 32-pdr., 2 × 24-pdr., 1 × 18-pdr

Jefferson Davis or Jeff Davis was a New Orleans full-rigged brig, built in Baltimore, Maryland in about 1845 as Putnam and captured off Cuba 21 August 1858 by Lt. John Newland Maffitt, USN, in USS Dolphin as the slaver Echo; her cargo of 271 enslaved Africans was returned to Africa in Niagara and Echo forfeited to the United States. Auctioned in January 1859, Echo reverted to her original name, Putnam, and was owned by Capt. Robert Hunter of Charleston, S. C.

== History ==
Hunter signed up 27 shareholders, including the elite of Charleston, and 10 of them applied for a letter of marque for Putnam to be known as Rattlesnake, but a name change to Jefferson Davis was approved by the State Department, 23 May, and the brig commissioned a privateer 18 June 1861 at Charleston Annex I. She was armed with five 68-pounder guns.

Jeff Davis was described by a prisoner as having "black mastheads and yards and a black hull" and being "very rusty." Another victim was misled by her "French-cut hempen sails." Master and shareholder was the "impudent sea robber," Louis M. Coxetter, a name soon to be placed high on the list of "pirates" most wanted by the U.S. Navy, although he treated his prisoners well, by their own account His mate, Lt. William Ross Postell, once pride of the Republic of Texas Navy, also ex-Lieutenant, USN, was equally sought.

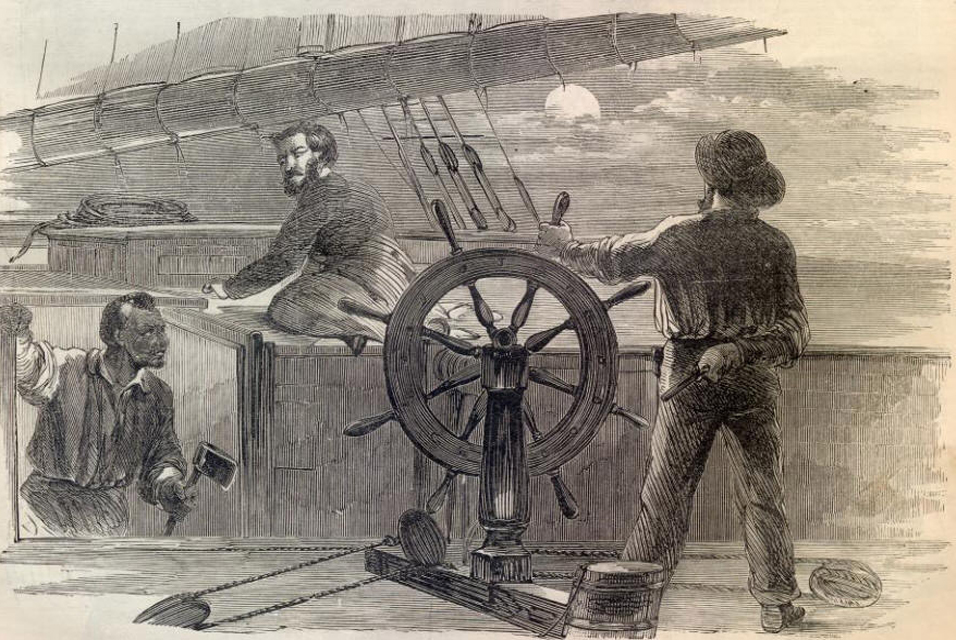
Recapture of the schooner S.J. Waring by William Tillman

On 28 June, celebrated by Charleston as the anniversary of driving off Admiral Sir Peter Parker in the Revolution, Jeff Davis received a gala send-off as she escaped to sea through Maffitt's Channel, "notwithstanding," as the Mercury quipped, "the very efficient blockade of Abraham I." Coxetter took 9 sail in 7 weeks in "the last truly classic cruise in the history of private-armed sea power." These included 3 brigs, 3 schooners, 2 ships and a bark", causing consternation on the coast from Maine to Delaware. Seeking to make Florida, Enchantress was recaptured by USS Albatross and her prize-master, William W. Smith, a Savannah pilot, was nearly hanged as a pirate, along with his prize-crew, by a New York court-perhaps the most celebrated case of its type during this war. Bark Alvarado was chased ashore by Jamestown and burned to prevent recapture at Fernandina, Fla. Coxetter released schooner Windward, brig Mary E. Thompson and ship Mary Goodell with prisoners, but had to burn John Carver, an Army ship with anthracite for the blockade. Schooner S. J. Waring was captured 6 July 1861 and the captain and 2 mates captured; the "Waring" with a prize crew consisting of Charleston SC Pilot Montague Amiel as Prizemaster, two mates (George Stevens and Malcolm Liddy) and two seamen were detailed to sail the S.J. Waring to Charleston SC. The Ships Cook William Tillman who was a free African American realized that he would be sold into slavery; on July 16, 1861, with the help of one seaman Tillman killed Amiel and the two mates 50 miles south of Charleston, SC . with an ax 100 miles off Charleston (The other two men became prisoners of War); The "Waring" was sailed into New York Harbor. Brigs John Welsh and Santa Clara got into Savannah safely as prizes and were auctioned at handsome figures. Jeff Davis' crew was augmented by deserters from several of her prizes.

Jeff Davis arrived off St. Augustine, Fla., 16 August but had to wait nearly two days for a half-gale to blow over; going in, finally, she grounded and even jettisoning the starboard guns did not save the brig; only stores and small arms were saved. Church bells rang and the town gave the shipwrecked privateersmen an ovation as heroes with a celebration lasting for days; on returning to Charleston, two weeks later, Captain Coxetter was honored with heavy gold watch and fob by admirers. Crowed Charleston Mercury, 26 August 1861, "The name of the privateer Jefferson Davis has become a word of terror to the Yankees. The number of her prizes and the amount of merchandise which she captured have no parallel since the days of the Saucy Jack," a Charlestonian privateer schooner in the War of 1812.

Coxetter attempted to organize a new privateering expedition without success, but putting to sea in steamer Herald he only added steadily to his fame by blockade running the remainder of the war.
