= Salvador Pirates =

Confederate Navy sailors

Salvador Pirates was the name given to the band of Confederate Navy sailors that attempted to seize a Panama Railroad coastal steamer on the high seas. Their intent was then to arm her and attack the Pacific Mail steamers and the American whalers in the North Pacific.

In spring of 1864, the Confederate Navy ordered Captain Thomas Egenton Hogg and his command to take passage on board a coastal steamer in Panama City, seize her on the high seas, arm her and attack the Pacific Mail steamers and the whalers in the North Pacific. In Havana, the American consul, Thomas Savage, learned about this conspiracy, and notified Rear Admiral George F. Pearson at Panama City. The Admiral had the passengers boarding the steamers at Panama City watched and when Hogg's command was found aboard the Panama Railroad steamer Salvador, a force from USS Lancaster arrested them and brought them to San Francisco.

The Salvador Pirates, as they came to be called, were tried for piracy by a military commission, convicted, and sentenced to be hanged, but General Irvin McDowell commuted their sentences. To prevent any further attempts to seize Pacific coast shipping, General McDowell ordered each passenger on board American merchant steamers to surrender all weapons when boarding, and every passenger and his baggage was searched. All officers were armed for the protection of their ships.

== See also ==
- Confederate privateer
