= Gerhard Reinke's Wanderlust =

- Created by: Josh Gardner; Tom Stern
- Starring: Josh Gardner
- Country of origin: United States
- No. of episodes: 6

Production
- Executive producers: Jimmy Kimmel; Adam Carolla; Daniel Kellison
- Running time: 30 minutes (with commercials)
- Production companies: Jackhole Industries; Comedy Central

Original release
- Network: Comedy Central
- Release: March 8 – April 12, 2003

Gerhard Reinke's Wanderlust is a mockumentary television comedy that was originally broadcast on the American basic cable channel Comedy Central in six episodes from March 8, 2003, to April 12, 2003. It stars writer-comedian Josh Gardner as Gerhard Reinke, a German backpacker with an idiosyncratic style, as he travels around the world on a small budget.

== List of episodes ==
No.	Title	Directed by	Written by	Original release date
1	"Thailand"	Tom Stern	Josh Gardner, Tom Stern	March 8, 2003
To prove his globetrotter prowess, Gerhard "randomly" selects Thailand (initially Siberia, but the less-than-enthused traveler cuts to the former) as the first adventure for the show. He first visits some spots in Bangkok, where he receives a painful Thai massage, views the world's largest Reclining Buddha, goes for a ride in a rickshaw in a manner similar to Taxicab Confessions, and performs in a comedy club. While at the club, he is treated to a bathroom massage which causes him to become pee shy. The shame of this condition plagues him for the length of the episode. He then visits a strip club where he witnesses the "ping pong ball trick" and, unable to pay his tab, is forced to perform it himself. Gerhard then travels to the hills of Chiang Mai where he visits a local tribe and participates in Muay Thai (a Thai martial art), becomes sick riding an elephant, and is rendered inaudible by a waterfall. Gerhard conducts a highly comical reenactment of the story of Buddha to better understand the region and its signature religion. Koh Samui and the Big Buddha Temple is the show's next destination, however, observing the custom of removing one's footwear is hindered by Gerhard's fear of the fungi and bacteria likely inhabiting the grounds. Instead, he chooses to enter the holy place wearing over-sized novelty feet. After conversing in Norwegian with a Dutch man about the quality of the Finnish people, Gerhard travels to Koh Phi Phi where he encounters several animals, engages in a flatulence contest with an elephant, and goes snorkeling, where he is chased by an aggressive, though small, jellyfish. Feeling that the island's very name is mocking his bashful bladder, he takes refuge in nearby Koh Hip Pi, where he witnesses rocks shaped like genitalia, learns to meditate, and practices tai chi. In a shaming experience, Gerhard is unable to urinate on his own foot after treading on a sea urchin; instead a complete stranger provides his urine to relieve the pain. Gerhard's last stop is Ko Pha Ngan, where he attends the monthly Full Moon Party, a hot-spot for travelers. The day following the party, Gerhard overcomes his "stage fright" and lets forth his stream into the ocean. Outtakes are shown over the closing credits of the episode which include Gerhard slipping over in an outdoor shower and being charged by a water buffalo.
2	"Ireland"	Tom Stern	Josh Gardner, Tom Stern	March 15, 2003
Gerhard Reinke travels to the Emerald Isle in hopes of realizing his lifelong dream of becoming the world's next greatest novelist. Gerhard is an admirer of the country's rich literary tradition which included writers such as James Joyce, Samuel Beckett, Oscar Wilde and, quite erroneously, Dean Koontz though having never actually read any of their works. After visiting a local writers museum Gerhard begins his novel, which focuses on a traveler bent on satisfying women with his impressive "erotic arsenal". At a visit to the Guinness Brewery he learns much about the process of beer making, including the mystery of yeast, enjoys a free pint and encounters the Johnson sisters, the world's second tallest identical twins who would soon factor into his erotica. Gerhard then partakes in a traditional Irish stepdance and professes his love for Riverdance. In an attempt to provide an etymology lesson, Gerhard reveals that many English words actually originated from Irish towns, the examples being Limerick ("a bawdy form of poetry"), Donnybrook ("a drunken brawl") and Cunnilingus ("to French kiss a woman's vagina"). Gerhard subsequently visits the Rock of Cashel at the same time taking shots at the "disappointing" Nicolas Cage and Sean Connery ("in a wig") movie The Rock, and the city of Cork where he stays in an eccentric bed and breakfast and encounters hooligans. Gerhard's next stop is Blarney Castle where he hopes to receive the gift of gab by kissing the famous Blarney Stone, but he is instead stricken with a cold sore which draws ridicule from the public and forces him to heal for two weeks in Barbados. Upon return to County Kerry, Gerhard plays golf with a Catholic priest who is less than amused with his on-course antics. In Doolin, a town famous for its music, Reinke attempts to incorporate the theremin into the traditional folk sounds. At Dingle, Gerhard takes in the views of the beehive houses and Fungi the Dingle Dolphin before a thumb injury sidelines him in Barbados once again. Though Gerhard finally decides to buckle down on his book he comes down with extreme writer's block and begins pub crawling in efforts to find himself. It only worsens as he drinks himself into a coma lasting some 24 days and incurs minor brain damage. After physical therapy and encouragement from those around him, he finishes his book "Irish Wood" which is self-published in the end.
3	"The Andes"	Tom Stern	Josh Gardner, Tom Stern	March 22, 2003
Gerhard becomes addicted to Coca leaves, and is kidnapped by the rebel group P.U.B.E (pronounced "pooh-bay"). There, Gerhard would be tapped to direct the P.U.B.E. training video, "Days of Pain and Victory." Upon release from the P.U.B.E. compound, Gerhard heads to Copacabana, along the shores of Lake Titicaca, in which he plans a snorkeling adventure only to discover, too late, its freezing temperature. Here Gerhard would visit a healer, hoping to find assistance with his coca leaf problem. It is from this healer that Gerhard receives the magic idol, Joselito. After a trip to Cusco for the Incan Festival of the Sun, Gerhard visits Machu Picchu, the wonder of which confounds Gerhard's English and German vocabularies, and forces him to use the Spanish word impressivo to convey the spectacle. In a closing number, Gerhard finally faces his coca addiction head-on, and wins, with now-enabler Joselito falling dramatically to his death.
4	"California"	Tom Stern	Josh Gardner, Tom Stern	March 29, 2003
Gerhard makes his way from Los Angeles to Humboldt. His journey begins in fashionable Venice Beach and on to Malibu, where he is attacked by Steven Spielberg with a baseball bat. He visits Disneyland, Silicon Valley, and a Danish village, survives an avalanche, drives through a redwood tree, and temporarily adopts an orphan dog, Zeppel. Gerhard soon decides it would be highly profitable to hunt for the elusive Bigfoot. Side-tracked in Garberville, Gerhard would join a band of hippies for tree hugging and a smoke-filled drum circle that would leave our hero paranoid and alienated. Pushing on alone to Willowcreek, A.K.A. Bigfoot Central, Gerhard learns more about the elusive cold-weather ape Bigfoot, and the impossible-to-replicate compliant gait. In the finale, Gerhard solves the mystery of Bigfoot and finds a home for Zeppel.
5	"The Amazon"	Tom Stern	Josh Gardner, Tom Stern	April 5, 2003
Gerhard travels the Amazon, hoping to uncover the mystery of the disappearance of his great-grandfather, the great explorer and pioneer behind the world's first non-spurious dicking creme, Helmut Reinke. Highlights include a taxidermy exhibit, a wildlife park (featuring an irascible monkey and a stunt-performing sloth), and visits to many native villages. Gerhard is also taken on a 'spirit journey' to communicate with his long-lost great-grandfather by an aboriginal medicine man, however, the great-grandfather who appears is not Gerhard's. Throughout the episode Gerhard is repeatedly attacked by the monkey from the wildlife park. The show ends with an unexpected turn, to at long last complete the legend of Helmut Reinke.
6	"Baja"	Tom Stern	Josh Gardner, Tom Stern	April 12, 2003
A brief bout of food poisoning, meeting a shaman who attempts to steal Gerhard's kidney whilst under the influence of dung from a peyote-eating coyote, becoming catatonic after using a machismo tester, and buying a foam iguana from a man named Froggy.
