= Philip Friedman =

American writer and lawyer (born 1944)

- Born: January 8, 1944 (age 82); United States
- Education: Princeton University (AB); University of California, Berkeley; Stanford University; New York University School of Law (JD)
- Writing career
- Pen name: Philip Chase
- Language: English
- Genres: Crime Fiction, Thriller
- Notable works: Inadmissible Evidence, Grand Jury
- Website: philipfriedmanbooks.com

Philip Friedman (born January 8, 1944) is an American author and attorney. His book Reasonable Doubt spent 15 weeks on the New York Times bestseller list He is also the co-author of a nonfiction book about the Pilates Method, co-author of the screenplay for the Warner Brothers movie Rage, and a practicing attorney.

== Education ==
Friedman received an AB in mathematics from Princeton University and studied mathematics as a research assistant at the Operations Research Center of the University of California, Berkeley, and at the graduate department of mathematics at Stanford University. He received a J.D. from New York University School of Law, where he won the American Jurisprudence Award in copyright law.

== Career ==
Friedman and Dan Kleinman wrote a treatment for what became the screenplay for the movie Rage while in law school. The movie starred and was directed by George C. Scott. Friedman wrote a novel based on the same story, which was published by Atheneum Press and was a featured selection of the Literary Guild.

A past member of the National Board of Mystery Writers of America, Friedman is the author of eleven other novels, including a series of legal thrillers that spent a total of 26 weeks on The New York Times' bestseller lists. Termination Order was selected for The New York Times’ list of the Best Books of 1979 (now called Notable Books). Friedman's series about a squad of military investigators and troubleshooters, written under the name Philip Chase, was published as paperback-originals by Dell Books.

From 1978 to 1990, Friedman was managing general partner of The High Frontier Company, a motion picture development company formed to produce a movie based on the book The High Frontier by Princeton physics professor Gerard K. O’Neill and on O’Neill's ongoing work envisioning the possibility of creating earth-like orbital habitations and replacing earth's polluting power plants by orbiting solar satellites, all made from materials obtained from the moon and asteroids.

In 1987, Friedman created a half-hour TV series, The Story of Billy Clay, for a joint venture of Reeves Entertainment and McGraw-Hill Publishers, under the auspices of the United States Information Agency. The series was intended to be both a TV drama and an aid to intermediate and advanced learners of English. Friedman wrote the pilot script and the”bible” for 26 episodes. The pilot was screened in 20 international cities, including Paris, Rome, Bogota, and Beijing.

Friedman's 1999 novel No Higher Law, the plot of which centered on millennial religious extremism, was published in the UK and Commonwealth market by Headline. Following 9/11, Friedman shelved the US manuscript indefinitely.

== Bibliography ==
=== Novels ===
- Rage, Atheneum Press, 1972; Paperback Library 1972
- Wall of Silence (original title: Act of Love, Act of War) Dell Books, 1979
- Termination Order, Dial Press, 1979, Dell Books, 1980
- Reasonable Doubt, Donald I Fine, 1990; Ballantine Books, 1990
- Inadmissible Evidence, Donald I Fine, 1992; Ballantine Books, 1993
- Grand Jury, Donald I Fine, 1995; Ballantine Books, 1996
- No Higher Law, Headline (UK), 1999

=== As Philip Chase ===
- Deadly Crusade, Dell Books, 1976
- Merchants of Death, Dell Books, 1976
- Defame and Destroy, Dell Books, 1976
- Betrayal in Eden, Dell Books, 1976

=== Nonfiction ===
- The Pilates Method of Physical and Mental Conditioning, with Gail Eisen, Doubleday, 1980

=== Short stories ===
- "Roads" in Legal Briefs edited by William Bernhardt
- "Dog Days" in Murder by Obsession, edited by Otto Penzler, honorable mention in The Best Mystery Stories of 1999, edited by Evan Hunter

=== Motion Picture Screenplay ===
- Rage, 1972, Warner Brothers
