= William Tillman =

American mariner (born c. 1834)

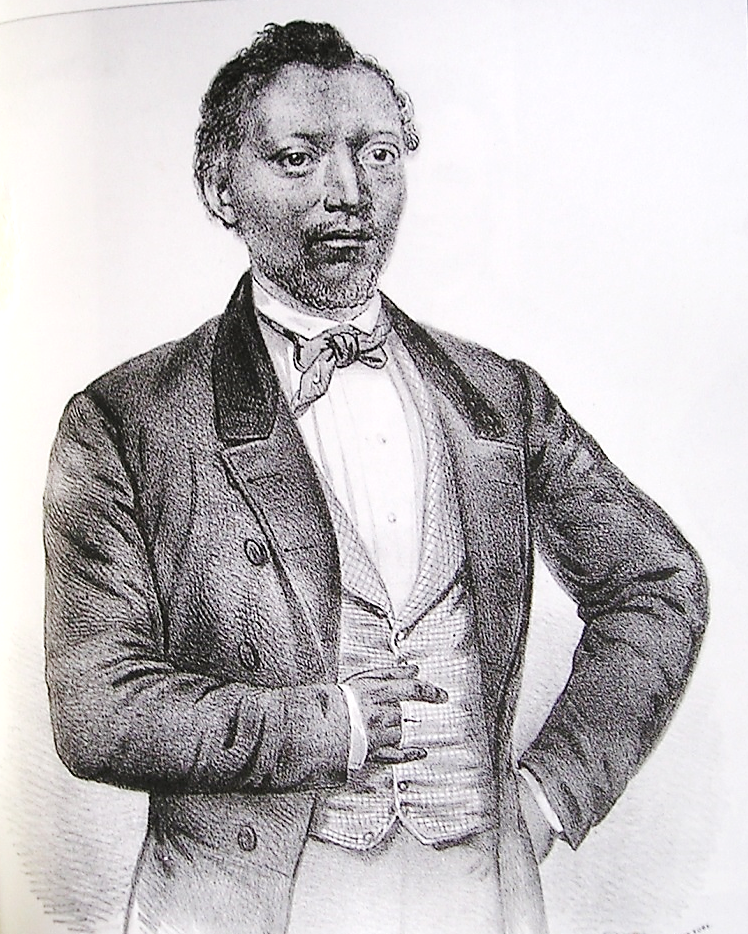
- Born: William B. Tillman c. 1834; Milford, Delaware, U.S.
- Occupation: Mariner
- Spouse: Julia Prophet
- Children: Frederick Tillman

William Tillman (c. 1834 – ?) was an American mariner known for his salvage of the S. J. Waring in July 1861.

== Early life and career ==
William B. Tillman was born in Milford, Delaware, in around 1834. Although most black Delawareans of his time were born into slavery, Tillman belonged to a family of free blacks. They relocated to Rhode Island around 1850, and Tillman began working as sailor, eventually to be hired by Jonas Smith & Co.

== Recapture of the Waring ==
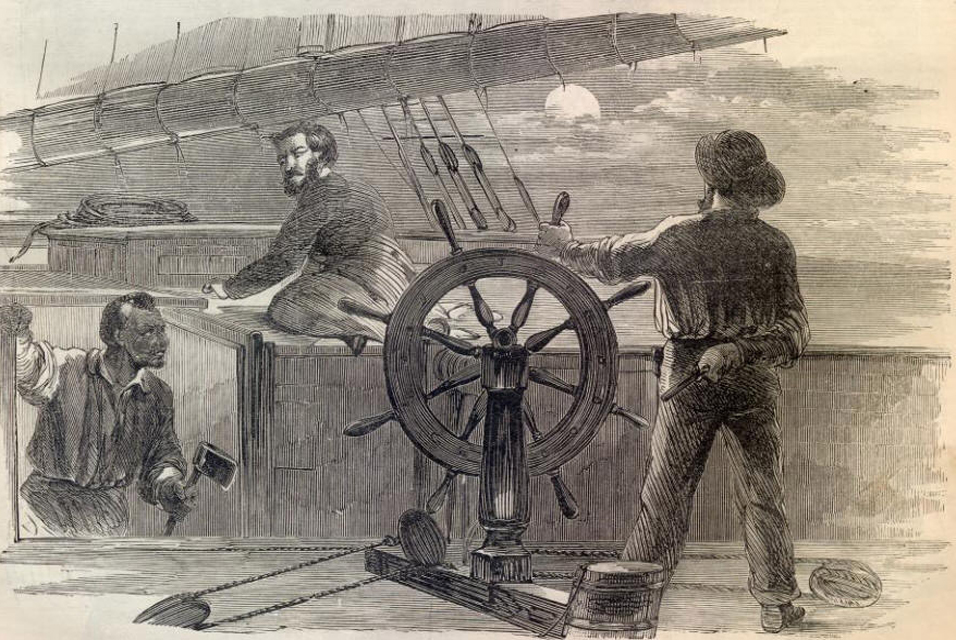
Recapture of the schooner S.J. Waring by William Tillman

The eight-year-old schooner S. J. Waring, owned by Jonas Smith & Co., set sail from New York on July 4, 1861, with Tillman among her ten-man crew. Three days later, the ship was seized by the Confederate privateer ship Jefferson Davis. and the captain and 2 mates captured; the "Waring" with a prize crew consisting of Charleston SC Pilot Montague Amiel as Prizemaster, two mates [George Stevens and Malcolm Liddy] and two seamen were detailed to sail the S.J. Waring to Charleston SC.The crew told Tillman that he would be sold into slavery after docking at their intended destination, Charleston, but still gave him permission to roam about the schooner and perform his duties as cook. Fiercely resistant to becoming a slave, Tillman enlisted fellow Waring sailor William Stedding's help in recapturing the ship. On July 16, Tillman waited until dark and struck both the captain and second mate multiple times in the head with a hatchet that he had hidden from the Confederates. A first mate who awoke was also killed in a similar fashion. The wounded men were thrown overboard to die, one of them being heard to call out after he hit the water. The entire operation took only eight minutes. The remaining two Southern shipmen were caged and Tillman assumed captaincy of the Waring, which he successfully navigated back to New York Harbor, reaching it on July 21. Tillman and Stedding were warmly received by the police, journalists, and curious onlookers alike. When asked if he had encountered any "difficulty" in mastering the men he had killed, Tillman replied:

They struggled a little, but I put them overboard quicker than lightning. They all had breathing life in them, and as they sank in the sea my heart palpitated slightly. It was a feeling of sorrow that I had been compelled to sacrifice human life. Everything being as still as midnight on the sea could possibly make it, I felt a shuddering sensation, but as soon as I felt the cause which impelled me on to the deed, I felt relieved.

No criminal charges were filed against Tillman. He and Stedding were approached by Phineas T. Barnum to make appearances at his museum; however, audience response was varied, with some denigrating William Tillman as a "villain" and "murderer". For his efforts in recapturing the Waring, Tillman was awarded seven thousand dollars by a Judge Shipman on February 6, 1862, after a salvage trial was established by the same judge on October 28 of the preceding year. The award was affirmed on May 13, 1862, after an appeal by Jonas Smith & Co. Jonas Smith's legal team had unsuccessfully argued that Tillman and the other salvors were not entitled to salvage because they were "ignorant of navigation" and, in Tillman's case, had acted out of selfish intent.

== Later years ==
Tillman wed housekeeper Julia Prophet on January 15, 1863. The couple had one son, Frederick (c. 1869 – ?). Tillman registered for conscription in June of the same year but it is not known if he actually performed military service during the Civil War. The date and place of his death are unknown; historian Gerald Henig asserts that "no verifiable evidence" exists to account for Tillman's final years.

== Legacy ==
Many of Tillman's contemporaries, including notable figures in the African-American community, paid tribute to him. Frederick Douglass likens him to the slave rebels Nat Turner and Denmark Vesey in his August 1861 Douglass' Monthly column titled "A Black Hero", adding that Tillman "walked to his work of self-deliverance with a step as firm and dauntless as the noblest Roman of them all". Booker T. Washington devotes two pages of his 1900 work A New Negro for a New Century to narrating Tillman's recapture of the schooner and praising him for being "as brave as a lion".

Tillman's story was retold in several contemporaneous publications, including The Bugle Blast (1864) and The Rebel Pirate's Fatal Prize (1865). Stories on Tillman also ran in Scientific American, Harper's Weekly, and Frank Leslie's Illustrated Weekly. A writer for the New-York Tribune remarked that the Union was "indebted" to William Tillman "for the first vindication of its honour on the sea". The Herald described Tillman as "the splendid son of Africa" while predicting that his name "will now become historic as the enacter of as great a piece of daring and heroism as perhaps the world ever saw." Similar sentiments were echoed in other abolitionist pieces.

The monthly American Phrenological Journal provided a thorough analysis of Tillman's phrenological profile:

He has more than a common degree of Firmness and self-reliance, considerable Self-Esteem, and large Approbativeness and Conscientiousness. His social faculties are well indicated. His Combativeness and Destructiveness are not predominant qualities, though they are rather strong. We judge that he would never quarrel nor exercise cruelty if he could well avoid it, but that he would be executive and thorough in whatever he undertook to do.
