= Josh Gardner (comedian) =

American comedian and writer (born 1971)

Josh Gardner (born 1971 in New York City) is an American comedian and writer, Gardner is best known for his role as Saul Malone, a Gee-al-agist, on Adult Swim's cult-classic Saul of the Mole Men. Gardner first appeared on TV under the name Gerhard Reinke, the German host of the Comedy Central travel show, Gerhard Reinke's Wanderlust, in 2003 (his real name was not listed in the credits as an actor, only as an Originator and Producer). Gardner also wrote for Comedy Central's The Man Show and the Fox series A Minute With Stan Hooper. Aside from comedy, Gardner wrote for television game shows such as You Don't Know Jack and Sports Geniuses. He was also a regular contributor as the character Deaf Frat Guy on The Adam Carolla Show, and continues to appear on The Adam Carolla Podcast. Josh is a graduate of Salisbury School and Hamilton College. On April 6, 2011, Josh released his album of original songs on iTunes titled Mr. Stinkfinger. On the February 22nd episode of the Adam Carolla Podcast, Josh announced his forthcoming album Winterbush, which will feature a much more "wintery" feel after the "autumnal" vibe of his last album. Nat Faxon is Gardner's cousin.

== Mr. Stinkfinger ==
Track listing

1. Dry Humping
2. We Can Make It Work
3. F M P T
4. Mr. Stinkfinger
5. Sex in the City
6. Stinkin' Dollar
7. Master of Disguise
8. (I & I) Paranoid
