= Anti-humor =

Style of comedy that is deliberately awkward or experimental

Anti-humor or anti-comedy is a type of alternative humor that is based on the surprise factor of absence of an expected joke or of a punch line in a narration that is set up as a joke, which in turn can have a humorous effect to some. This kind of anticlimax is similar to that of the shaggy dog story. In fact, some researchers see the "shaggy dog story" as a type of anti-joke. Anti-humor is described as a form of irony or reversal of expectations that may provoke an emotion opposite to humor, such as fear, pain, embarrassment, disgust, awkwardness, or discomfort.

== Examples ==
The yarn, also called a shaggy dog story, is a type of anti-humor that involves telling an extremely long joke with an intricate (and sometimes grisly) backstory and surreal or repetitive plotline, before ending the story with either a weak spoonerism, or abruptly stopping with no real punchline at all, or "no soap, radio".

The obvious punchline involves narratives that are structured like a traditional joke including a set-up and punchline, but whose punchline is the most obvious to the narrative. Some examples of this would be the Why did the chicken cross the road? and the "What did the farmer say/do" set of jokes, which include various situations where the joke teller asks the listener what the farmer did in any given situation:

A: What did the farmer say when he lost his tractor?
B: I don't know, what did the farmer say when he lost his tractor?
A: "Where's my tractor?"

A: What did one lawyer say to the other lawyer?
B: I don't know, what did they say?
A: "We're both lawyers!"

== In stand-up comedy ==
Alternative comedy, among its other aspects, parodies the traditional idea of the joke as a form of humor. Anti-humor jokes are also often associated with deliberately bad stand-up comedians. Stand-up comedian Andy Kaufman had his own unique brand of anti-humor, quasi-surrealist acts coupled with performance art; one of his best-known manifestations of this was his act as the fictional persona of Tony Clifton, an untalented lounge lizard entertainer. Norm Macdonald was another comedian sometimes associated with performing anti-humor, although he objected to the characterization.

== See also ==
- Anti-art – Art rejecting prior definitions of art
- Dada – Avant-garde art movement in the early 20th century
- Dad joke – Type of short joke
- Meta-joke – Humor that alludes to itself
- Nonsense verse – Form of nonsense literature
- Surreal humour – Form of humour predicated on deliberate violations of causal reasoning
- The Aristocrats – Offensive joke about a performance act
- Koan – Short instructive text in some Buddhist practices
- No soap radio – Surreal joke phrase
- Non sequitur – Conversational literary device
- Why did the chicken cross the road? – Common joke or riddle
