= Adam Eget =

American podcaster and producer

- Born: 1979 (age 46–47); Santa Monica, Los Angeles, California

Comedy career
- Years active: 2013–present
- Medium: Podcasts, television, film
- Genre: Comedy

Adam Eget (born 1979) is an American presenter, podcaster, television producer and talent coordinator, most well known as the co-host of the video podcast Norm Macdonald Live alongside Norm Macdonald from 2013 to 2017, and later Norm Macdonald Has a Show. Eget worked as the talent coordinator of The Comedy Store from 2014 until 2021 and currently works at Joe Rogan's comedy club, Comedy Mothership, and as a screenwriter for Lionsgate Films.

== Career ==
=== Working with Norm Macdonald ===
According to Canadian comedian and frequent collaborator Norm Macdonald, Macdonald knew Adam Eget since his time working on Saturday Night Live. Eget is stated to have been eighteen at the time and had a car, so Macdonald "made him" become his personal assistant. Eget has said he first met Macdonald at the Tempe Improv in Tempe, Arizona, connecting over a "shared love of poker or Fawlty Towers", before the release of The Office US, but during the release of The Office UK, which they both enjoyed. Eget later became a manager at the Tempe Improv in 2010. In 2013, Norm Macdonald and Eget began working on the video podcast production Norm Macdonald Live, hosting the premiere with Bob Einstein character Super Dave Osborne. The podcast aired on Video Podcast Network on a weekly basis. Eget explained that he and Macdonald wanted to "combine the intimacy and fascinating one-on-one conversational style of Tom Snyder combined with the punk irreverence of early Letterman". Eget co-hosted Norm Macdonald Has a Show with Macdonald in 2018.

=== The Comedy Store and other ventures ===
In 2014, Eget replaced Tommy Morris as talent coordinator of The Comedy Store in West Hollywood, California. Eget incorporated major changes to the club, including the continuation of Roast Battle, which had been introduced by comedian Brian Moses a year earlier. Many veteran comedians were phased out by Eget. Previous acts, such as Joe Rogan, returned to the club's lineup, marking Rogan's first appearance at The Comedy Store since heckling comedian Carlos Mencia for stealing material. Eget resigned his position at The Comedy Store in April 2021, taking up a similar role at Joe Rogan's new comedy club, located in Austin, Texas. In 2026, Lionsgate Films finalised a deal with Eget for the development of comedy features for the production company, ranging across podcasts, stand-up and live touring projects. Lionsgate Film President Erin Westerman expressed excitement for the partnership with Eget, describing a "strong track record of discovering unique and promising new comedic talent at the earliest stages in their careers".

Eget starred in David Spade's Joe Dirt 2: Beautiful Loser in a minor role in 2015, and has appeared as a guest on multiple podcasts including The Joe Rogan Experience, The Duncan Trussell Family Hour, and Where My Moms At? with Christina Pazsitzky. Eget worked with Spade again as comic booker for Lights Out with David Spade, also taking on producer roles for the docu-series The Comedy Store in 2020, and Fate: The Winx Saga – The Afterparty in 2021.

== Personal life and early career ==
Adam Eget was born in Santa Monica, and grew up in the San Fernando Valley area of Los Angeles County, California. At the age of fourteen, Eget's parents divorced, leading to teenage depression. Eget spent some time at a CEDU boarding school located in the San Bernardino Mountains. Eget attended William Howard Taft Charter High School and studied film at college.

Eget worked in the entertainment industry early in his career, working as Amy Heckerling's personal assistant. Eget had a short stint as a comedian, before becoming a bartender in Arizona.

Eget has a sister, half brother and half sister.

== Filmography ==
Year	Title	Role	Writer?	Producer?	Ref.
2013–2017	Norm Macdonald Live	Co-host	Yes	No	
2015	Joe Dirt 2: Beautiful Loser	Buffalo Bob	No	No	
2016	The Duncan Trussell Family Hour	Guest	No	No	
2018	Norm Macdonald Has a Show	Co-host	Yes	No	
2019–2020	Lights Out with David Spade	Comic booker	No	No	
2020	Whiskey Ginger	Guest	No	No	
2020	The Joe Rogan Experience	Guest	No	No	
2020	The Comedy Store	Producer	No	Yes	
2021	Fate: The Winx Saga – The Afterparty	Segment producer	No	Yes	
2022, 2025	Matt and Shane's Secret Podcast	Guest	No	No	
2023	Where My Moms At?	Guest	No	No	
