= The Midnight Gospel =

American animated television series

- Promotional release poster
- Genre: Science fantasy; Surrealism; Dark comedy; Adventure
- Created by: Pendleton Ward; Duncan Trussell
- Written by: Pendleton Ward; Duncan Trussell; Mike L. Mayfield
- Directed by: Pendleton Ward
- Voices of: Duncan Trussell; Phil Hendrie
- Composer: Joe Wong
- Country of origin: United States
- Original language: English
- No. of seasons: 1
- No. of episodes: 8

Production
- Executive producers: Pendleton Ward; Duncan Trussell; Chris Prynoski; Ben Kalina; Antonio Canobbio
- Producers: Shannon Prynoski; Tony Salama
- Editor: Megan Love
- Running time: 20–36 minutes
- Production companies: Oatmeal Maiden; Titmouse, Inc. Netflix Animation Studios

Original release
- Network: Netflix
- Release: April 20, 2020

Related
- The Duncan Trussell Family Hour

The Midnight Gospel is an American adult animated television series created by Pendleton Ward and Duncan Trussell. Released on Netflix on April 20, 2020, it sets real podcast interviews between Trussell and various guests into surrealistic adventures, typically telling a story alongside the real podcast audio through the environment and extra voice work by Trussell and the guests of the original podcast.

Set in a dimension known as the Chromatic Ribbon, a spacecaster named Clancy Gilroy owns an unlicensed multiverse simulator. Through it, he travels through bizarre worlds on the brink of disaster, interviewing some of their residents for his spacecast. The interviews are derived from earlier episodes of Trussell's podcast The Duncan Trussell Family Hour. Special guests include Phil Hendrie, Stephen Root, Drew Pinsky, Damien Echols, Trudy Goodman, Jason Louv, Caitlin Doughty, Michael Marcanio, Maria Bamford, Joey Diaz, David Nichtern, and Deneen Fendig.

In June 2022, Trussell announced that Netflix cancelled the series after one season.

== Synopsis ==
The Midnight Gospel revolves around a spacecaster named Clancy Gilroy, who lives on the Chromatic Ribbon, a membranous, tape-like planet situated in the middle of a colorful void where simulation farmers use powerful bio-organic computers to simulate a variety of universes from which they harvest natural resources and new technology. Each episode revolves around Clancy's travels through planets within the simulator, with the beings inhabiting these worlds as the guests he interviews for his spacecast. These interviews are based on actual interviews, with real audio sampled from Trussell's podcast, The Duncan Trussell Family Hour. The episodes typically end with an apocalyptic event from which Clancy barely manages to escape.

== Cast and characters ==
=== Main ===
- Duncan Trussell as Clancy Gilroy

=== Recurring ===
- Phil Hendrie as Universe Simulator and various characters
- Stephen Root as Bill Taft and various characters
- Maria Bamford as Butt Demon and various characters
- Doug Lussenhop as Daniel Hoops and various characters
- Joey "Coco" Diaz as Chuck Charles, Steve and various characters
- Christina P. as Bobua and various characters
- Steve Little as Captain Bryce and various characters
- Johnny Pemberton as Cornelius and various characters

=== Guests ===
- Drew Pinsky as Little President (Episode 1 and Episode 5)
- Natasha Leggero as Peggy (Episode 1)
- Anne Lamott as Anne Deer Dog (Episode 2)
- Raghu Markus as Raghu Deer Dog (Episode 2)
- Damien Echols as Darryl the Fish (Episode 3)
- Trudy Goodman as Trudy the Love Barbarian (Episode 4)
- Pauly Shore as Prince Jam Roll (Episode 4)
- Jason Louv as Jason (Episode 5)
- Eddie Pepitone as Bob (speaking voice) (Episode 5)
- Johanna Warren as Bob (singing voice) (Episode 5)
- David Nichtern as His Divine Grace, God's Scientist (Episode 1) and David (Episode 6)
- Dante Pereira-Olson as Shanerreyus (Episode 6)
- Will Oldham as Bubble Max (Episode 6)
- Caitlin Doughty as Death (Episode 7)
- Deneen Fendig as herself (Clancy's/Duncan's mother) (Episode 8)
- Ram Dass as Ram Dass (Episode 8)

== Episodes ==
All episodes were directed by Pendleton Ward, and written by Mike L. Mayfield, Duncan Trussell and Pendleton Ward, with Brendon Walsh co-writing "Officers and Wolves" and Meredith Kecskemety co-writing "Blinded by My End".

No.	Title	Interview subject(s)	Original podcast	Original release date
1	"Taste of the King"	Drew Pinsky	Episode 147	April 20, 2020
Clancy visits Earth 4-169, which happens to be in the midst of a zombie apocalypse. Clancy, in the form of a beach body, decides to interview the sim Glasses Man, who he discovers is, in fact, the President in this universe. In front of the White House, a group of anti-marijuana protesters are gathered, seemingly unbothered by the zombies around them. This sparks debate between Clancy and Glasses Man as to whether there is such a thing as a 'good drug' or a 'bad drug'. Over the course of the episode, the two discuss the pros and cons of psychedelics, the dangers of drug usage if not well educated, and whether or not drugs can be beneficial for an individual's personal spiritual growth. They end up helping a pregnant woman (Peggy) give birth before they are all turned into zombies. However, they find this new situation a relief. This does not last long as they are hit with a cure bringing them back to life that, ironically, means the zombies can kill them again. Clancy returns to his dimension, along with a local dog named Charlotte, as the Earth explodes.
2	"Officers and Wolves"	Anne Lamott and Raghu Markus	Episode 301	April 20, 2020
Clancy visits "Clown World" as a strange mishmash creature from a pop-up ad that infected his computer. While witnessing some deer-dogs devouring baby clowns, he meets two of them, Annie and Raghu, and the trio is shipped off to a slaughterhouse where they are converted into sentient meat mush creatures. They discuss the concepts of death and accepting it with Annie talking about people who were close to her who had no choice but to accept, due to having cancer. With Raghu, they discuss Christianity and Jesus when he faced death. As they talk, it is revealed that the denizens of the world have been taken over by robot clown heads. A resistance group starts an uprising and destroys the facility creating the meat mush. Clancy, Anne, and Raghu get devoured by a giant fly, then are regurgitated to feed its baby maggots. Satisfied with their answers, Clancy travels back to his dimension, having collected a pair of green glass slippers, and relaxes after tossing a clown baby into Charlotte's dimensional stomach.
3	"Hunters Without a Home"	Damien Echols	Episode 314	April 20, 2020
Clancy earns a new subscriber named Daniel Hoops who wants Clancy to get him some ice cream. He heads to an "Ass Cream" planet, which is actually a world that has been completely flooded, and meets a fish-man named Darryl who has an entire crew composed of cats. Together, they crew an elaborate ship with non-Euclidean geometry. Clancy helps him acquire a special device that allows them to traverse a section of the world that is covered in ice. Darryl explains how his stint in prison helped him redefine the term "magic" to meaning anything that someone can achieve on a spiritual level such as Buddhism. He notes that western magical paths, such like that espoused by Aleister Crowley, are intended to achieve enlightenment in one lifetime. He further explains how meditation is key to achieving magic and how the Bible "when read correctly" can be understood as magic. They encounter a sleeping giant named Barry and go inside his ear where Darryl transforms himself into a giant to fight Barry over a past aggression. They end up causing their own world to detonate as Clancy takes an ice cream unicorn he found and returns home. He sends the ice cream and some gifts to Daniel. He accepts them but is beaten by his father, Magistrate Hoops, an important politician, for having them.
4	"Blinded by My End"	Trudy Goodman	Episode 300	April 20, 2020
Clancy's computer suggests that he heads to "Mercuritaville" for partying. As Clancy is fired upon the planet, the ship full of cats from the previous episode, knocks him off course and he lands in a medieval-style planet instead. He meets Trudy the Love Barbarian who possesses a rose that can heal minor blood injuries and Clancy decides to follow her. Trudy's boyfriend Gerald is killed by the sinister Prince Jam Roll and together set off on a quest to avenge him. Along the way, Clancy and Trudy discuss ideas of connecting with those close to you. The two talk about forgiveness and how people should value their time with others regardless of having any attachment to them. Trudy picks up a potion from a witch, then kills her, before the two face off against Jam Roll who turns out to be a monstrous being. They kill him and Trudy uses the potion to bring Gerald back to life. Suddenly, Jam Roll's body begins to destroy the planet as Clancy returns to his dimension. He takes the rose back and discovers that it still works.
5	"Annihilation of Joy"	Jason Louv	Episode 302	April 20, 2020
Having thrown up on the rose, Clancy realizes he needs to revive it with music. He takes a new avatar, a rainbow named Nell Noheem, and discovers that the computer has made a planet called Moon R3T8 which houses lost souls who have cut out their tongues in a prison. Clancy crashes through the prison, which houses the souls of characters from the previous episodes, and gets entangled with a prisoner named Bob who has a soul bird named Jason. Bob finds himself trying to escape the prison; every time he dies his heart is weighed against a feather and he has to relive his escape until he gets it right. Jason discusses with Clancy the concept of self-awareness and accepting that all souls are connected and thrive on the belief systems that we have set in place. Bob eventually manages to successfully escape without killing anyone, but still dies by getting impaled on a stalagmite. His heart is good however and becomes a clock that alters time. He uses it to escape the prison and he regrows his tongue and sings. The simulation ends and Clancy returns home where he discovers that the rose is encased in a shrine for rats who want healing, or as Clancy puts it they became "some kind of cult" and shoos them away.
6	"Vulture with Honor"	David Nichtern	Episode 315	April 20, 2020
Clancy gets a call from his older sister Sarah, who claims that she is no longer upset about taking her money to purchase the simulator and that she still cares about him. He angrily rebuffs her and begins to ignore the now steaming simulator. He decides to see his neighbors Blithfreyus and his children Shanefreyus and Stephreyus who use their simulator to steal artifacts for money. They inform him that he needs to use green oil on the simulator or else it will overheat, something the computer told him numerous times, but chose to ignore. Clancy calls Captain Bryce to help retrieve a lantern creature to get the oil, but after Bryce gets caught in a "wobble", Clancy just steals the oil from his neighbors. Frustrated, the computer sends him to Buton 78914 as an Octopus Sheriff to see his friend David. David teaches Clancy about meditation and how clearing one's mind is not the goal, but instead learning to see what is around you is more important. Content, Clancy returns home with a much more optimistic view on things.
7	"Turtles of the Eclipse"	Caitlin Doughty	Episode 318	April 20, 2020
Clancy claims to be enlightened from his previous adventure and decides to head to the planet Blank Ball; taking on his own exact appearance but made of cream. He immediately grows bored and pulls out a water slide. He digs into his pack to look for a water hose and falls into another world where he meets Death, who takes on the form of a typical grim reaper, but with a "fun eyeball". Clancy decides to interview Death while they traverse their strange surroundings in search of a small foolish creature who has made off with the water hose. The conversation goes into the American institutionalized view of death and how history has made people believe various misinformation about it. They eventually catch up with the fool where Death kills him with ping pong balls (his predicted death). Clancy almost dies from falling from a cliff, but Death tells him he dies in a rolly chair. Clancy finally rides the water slide and returns home where he tosses out his rolly chair before admitting that being enlightened was "embarrassing".
8	"Mouse of Silver"	Deneen Fendig	Episode 42	April 20, 2020
As Clancy (Duncan) is about to blast off to another world, his mother (Deneen) suddenly shows up within the simulator on a spaceship full of teddy bears who are studying love and happiness. Clancy reverts to a child as he and his mother begin to age. Deneen begins by talking about Clancy's birth and his history as an infant before the two dissect the feeling of being. After Deneen expires, Clancy becomes pregnant and gives birth to an infant Deneen who continues their conversation about accepting one's situation in life. Clancy reveals that Deneen has stage four breast cancer and she explains how she and Clancy must deal with it; by crying. They ascend out into space as spirits and then as planets and discuss how most people avoid the subject of death with other things and that is why death becomes such a harsh subject to everyone. Clancy accepts Deneen's death as she is sucked into a black hole. Outside, Magistrate Hoops brings the police down on Clancy, whose simulator is once again steaming up. Charlotte protects Clancy from a bullet aimed at him as they both get sucked into the simulator which then explodes; killing everyone within range and letting out "wobbles" all over the place. Blithfreyus, spooked by seeing the purple wobbles are headed straight towards him, escapes into his simulator with his kids. Clancy and Charlotte find themselves getting picked up by a train full of all the people they met in the previous episodes. Clancy sits next to one and asks if they are dead, to which the passenger, a representation of spiritual scholar Ram Dass, says "Just be here now."

== Development ==
=== Concept and creation ===
While working on Adventure Time, Pendleton Ward heard about Duncan Trussell's podcast The Duncan Trussell Family Hour from storyboard artist Jesse Moynihan, who would later serve as art director for The Midnight Gospel. Ward became interested in the podcast because of his taste for listening to people talking about philosophy. According to Ward, "Duncan is a lot of fun." Around 2013, during the start of his podcast broadcast, Trussell received an email from Ward praising him for his podcast. About a year later, Ward stepped down as showrunner for Adventure Time. Despite saying in an interview that he would not work on another series, Ward was taking the first steps in a new series anchored in the adaptation of Trussell's podcast. Sometime later Trussell and Ward became friends and Ward suggested to Trussell to turn his podcast into an animated series. According to Ward, Trussell had the ability to make 2 hours of a meditation conversation funny. Trussell says: "He reached out to me and said he had an idea for how to animate my podcast, which was another big thrill for me." In the first meeting with Ward, Trussell declined to join to a new project claiming he was too busy to turn his podcast into an animated show. In 2018, Ward approached him again to show a rough concept; taking a podcast conversation about drug addiction and playing it over an animatic of Trussell and his guest fighting off a zombie invasion.

=== Writing and production ===
Later, this rough concept ended up being incorporated into the pilot of the series. The two took the concept of the series in pitching form to Mike Moon, head of adult animations at Netflix. In 2019, Netflix ordered eight episodes, which premiered on April 20, 2020. After gaining the green light, the two gathered a team of comedians like Johnny Pemberton, Brendon Walsh, "Weird Al" Yankovic and Emo Philips who were joined by occult scholar Jason Louv and white witch Maja D'Aoust. The two assembled a team of approximately 190 people at Titmouse and started working on creating the episodes. Mike Mayfield joined the project as a supervising director and writer for all the episodes. The team behind the show is composed of Jesse Moynihan (art director), Antonio Canobbio (Chief Creative Officer for Titmouse), Mike Roush (animation director) and Joey Adams (storyboard supervisor). Mayfield said that the team needed to "try something nine different ways before one little change would make it go from clunky to incredible."

During the beginning of production, they needed to know how much of the episodes would be story, how much would be a podcast conversation, and they needed to choose which parts of the podcast to use in the show. According to Trussell, the parts of the podcast chosen for the series are about highlighting revelatory moments from his career. Trussell said: "When I’m doing a podcast, there are moments where my whole universe changes because someone told me something that I never knew. Once you hear that, you’re forever changed; you live in a completely different dimension than you lived in before." When Ward and Trussell started working on the scripts, Ward said it would be like taking an Indiana Jones movie and replacing the dialogue with podcast conversations. The main idea was to turn it into an entertaining animated show. They began to develop it out to following a concept. According to Trussell that concept was "During the apocalypse, people aren’t just going to talk about the apocalypse, being in apocalyptic movies the situation revolves all around the survival.’ Sort of the genesis of the show is what would happen if we took these podcast conversations and made them the dialogue that was happening during the various forms of the apocalypse."

The concept was expanded as the writer’s room began exploring various potential apocalypses and finding a way to ensure that the podcast material was able to match up the storylines they built around the episode. The main challenge of writing the episodes, besides choosing the best interviews, was making them coherent for animation. Trussell described this as a "laborious process" while also realizing it helped evolve the series with a story arc. They also worked to find a way to embed them in the psychedelic apocalyptic tapestry of the animation. They thought episodes should have a balance so the animation would not take people out of the interview. With an excessive focus on animation, people would not pay attention to everything equally. The team worked to let the conversations react with the world. According to Trussell, the influence for The Midnight Gospel came from Adult Swim's lo-fi aesthetic in general and shows like Space Ghost Coast to Coast and Aqua Teen Hunger Force. Other references included the animated films Watership Down and The Last Unicorn, the animated television series Æon Flux and Liquid Television, and the mystery horror drama television series Twin Peaks.

For Ward, it was Trussell's long-form audio chats that inspired him to return to TV animation and the new series was a chance to explore making animation for adults. Until then he had made animations primarily for children and The Midnight Gospel would be a chance to change his way of making animations using the ultra-violence of cartoons with conversations on compassion. Ward also allowed Trussell to include his own original music in several episodes. Joe Wong, the composer from the show, included his own song "Dreams Wash Away" from his debut album Nite Creatures in first-season finale. The show's title came from the good news sense of the word gospel. Trussell says, "'Gospel' means good news, and I was hoping that we convey the message that even through the most catastrophic situations, when everything is falling apart, there is opportunity to grow as a person."

On June 3, 2022, Ward announced that Netflix cancelled the series after one season.

== Themes and analysis ==
Throughout the episodes, the series deals with different themes which were explored in the interviews. During the first season, the guests interviewed covered topics such as magic, meditation, forgiveness, spiritualism, funerary rituals, death positivity, drug use, pain, moksha (transcendence) and existentialism. The animation also acts as a background for stories that expand the interviews. The storylines are therefore, similarly wide-ranging. The second episode opens with deer-dog hybrids mangling baby clowns; compared to the fourth, which follows the journey of a knight seeking vengeance against an ass-wielding villain. These eclectic themes are selected in such a way as to complement the dialogue of the interview they accompany. For example, during the episode with interviewee Anne Lamott, she comments on her lack of fear of death, as her character is wheeled to an industrial meat grinder run by a shudder of clowns. These animated backstories are designed to pull the viewer into the conversation, making them an important part of the exploration of said subject.

One constant in several episodes is the life cycle. The series reinforces how this cycle is a continuous, neverending process and one cannot escape it. In the last episode of the first season, there is a deeper discussion about the miracle of life, the suffering that existence brings to human life, and the detestable pain that death brings with it. The main theme of this episode entitled "Mouse of Silver" is to deal with the loss of a loved one. Despite being the main theme in this episode, the theme reappears in several others at different levels. For Trussell, the last episode becomes even more personal due to the discourse brought by the deep sorrow he felt after he lost his mother to cancer.

== Marketing and release ==
The first teaser was released on March 16, and the main trailer on April 6. As part of promoting the show, Netflix's YouTube channel launched a livestream on April 19, 2020, with a countdown to the series' debut on the streaming service. Throughout the livestream, small portions of the episodes were shown as well as a psychedelic animation. The user's manual for the Multiverse Simulator used by Clancy was made available online by Netflix through the show's Reddit account as part of its promotional campaign.

The eight-episode first season, ordered by Netflix, was released on April 20, 2020. According to Trussell, Netflix executives first suggested launching the series on April 20, Trussell's birthday and the date of annual cannabis-oriented celebrations.

== Reception ==
=== Critical response ===
Reception of the series has been largely positive, with several critics pointing to the last episode of the season called "Mouse of Silver" as the most touching and exciting of the season. The series has received praise for its visuals, animation and the way it deals with deep and philosophical subjects. On review aggregation website Rotten Tomatoes, the first season has an approval rating of 91% based on 34 reviews, with an average rating of 7.68/10. The site's consensus reads "The Midnight Gospel's strange brew won't be for all tastes, but those willing to drink deep will find a wealth of vibrant visuals and illuminating insights." On Metacritic, the first season has a score of 82 out of 100, based on reviews from eight critics, indicating "universal acclaim".

In a positive review, Robert Lloyd from Los Angeles Times said the visual style is reminiscent of Adventure Time though it also has its own style, while presenting conversations about real issues. Lloyd said "Like Adventure Time, but more explicitly, it takes an interest in matters of birth, death, rebirth, transfiguration. Death especially, though this provides for some of the series' most peaceful sequences." Stuart Jeffries from The Guardian called The Midnight Gospel a trippy Mr Benn for adults and said that the show was engagingly bonkers in a quest for philosophical truth on a psychedelic journey through space. He points out how the last episode "Mouse of Silver" is the most touching and engaging episode of the season. IndieWire critic Eric Kohn gives a grade A to the first season, calling the show a deep cosmic journey. He acclaims a rich, energizing quality to these discussions as they grow more heated. "Even as the show builds to an enticing cliffhanger, it seems to suggest that living in the moment matters more than whatever happens next." In a positive critique, Joshua Robinson from Thrillist said "There's adult animation, and there's The Midnight Gospel." In a mixed review, Jesse Schedeen from IGN said "It pairs a laid-back, talk-heavy approach with lavish, surrealist animation. But much like the podcast episodes it frames itself around, there's not much in the way of an ongoing narrative to reward viewers or justify a binge session." In a less enthusiastic review for Collider, Dave Trumbore said "It's like watching a psychotic lava lamp while listening to your college roommate wax on and on after a week of Philosophy 101 and a few rounds of stacking bong hits."

Some critics have said there are both similarities and differences between The Midnight Gospel and Rick and Morty for the style of animation and the way they deal with deep themes. David Opie from Digital Spy said The Midnight Gospel is an antithesis to Rick and Morty. He said that both shows change their viewers' worldview, and "Rick and Morty might embrace nihilism more than most, thriving in the chaos of Rick's anarchic worldview, but the world ends over and over again for real in The Midnight Gospel, providing a cosmic counterpoint to the introspective teachings of the 'space-cast'." He also said the show deals positively with topics like hope and loss.

== Future ==
On June 3, 2022, Trussell confirmed that the show had been cancelled by Netflix. Previously he had expressed the desire for more episodes, stating that "[the world of the Chromatic Ribbon] is a very big world. I spent a long time with Pen working out all the details. Some people might see it and think some people are saying gibberish, that something was absurd and unintended, but every brick in that structure, every piece of the puzzle is intentional and based on a lot of lore. It's a very, very, very, very interesting big world, and I would love to explore that world for as long as I possibly can." Upon revealing the cancellation, Trussell elaborated he had one more season in mind.
