= Duncan Trussell =

American comedian and actor (born 1974)

- Born: Charles Duncan Trussell; April 20, 1974 (age 52); Asheville, North Carolina, U.S.
- Occupations: Actor, comedian
- Children: 4
- Website: www.duncantrussell.com

Charles Duncan Trussell (born April 20, 1974) is an American actor and stand-up comedian. He is known for being the host of his podcast The Duncan Trussell Family Hour. Trussell also appeared on and co-created the Netflix series The Midnight Gospel (2020) and starred alongside Joe Rogan in the SYFY series Joe Rogan Questions Everything (2013).

== Career ==
Besides being a comedian and actor, Trussell is also a podcaster, writer, and musician. He has written and appeared in sketches for two seasons of Fuel TV's Stupidface, Showtime's La La Land, Comedy Central's Nick Swardson's Pretend Time, and both seasons of HBO's Funny or Die Presents.

Trussell regularly tours the country as a stand-up comedian and has performed at Just for Laughs Festival in Montreal and the Moontower Comedy Festival in Austin.

His television credits include MADtv and Curb Your Enthusiasm. He hosted Thunderbrain, a comedy science pilot for Comedy Central. In addition, Trussell has appeared on Cartoon Network's Adventure Time, four episodes of the Funny or Die web series Drunk History, as well as appearing on Comedy Central's This is Not Happening. He has also written and served as a consultant for Jason Sudeikis's hosting duties at the 2011 MTV Movie Awards. He co-hosted The Lavender Hour podcast with Natasha Leggero through January 2012.

Trussell hosts his own podcast, The Duncan Trussell Family Hour (DTFH). The DTFH is an ongoing project where Trussell invites eclectic guests to open conversation for about an hour per episode. Beyond his commercial image as an actor and comedian, Trussell is also a burgeoning spiritual teacher in the tradition of Tibetan Buddhism. He frequently invokes applicable uses of Dharma teachings in his podcast, for both daily life and exceptionally difficult or rare circumstances. He denies the label of "Buddhist Comedian", but his podcast's humor frequently draws on high-concept Vajrayana metaphysics, and he commonly references the professional work of spiritual leaders such as Ram Dass and Chögyam Trungpa during conversations with guests. Trussell also hosts a weekly meditation session and discussion of mindfulness practice for fans that subscribe to his work through Patreon.

Among the guests that have been featured are Andrew Yang, Joe Rogan, Ram Dass, Amishi Jha, Dan Harmon, Joey Diaz, Tim Ferriss, Lou Barlow, Bert Kreischer, Alex Grey, Rick Doblin, Natasha Leggero, Graham Hancock, Abby Martin, Dr. Drew, Daniele Bolelli, Christopher Ryan, and comedian, podcaster Jessa Reed. Musical features include The Sun Days. As of September 2026, there have been over 700 episodes of the DTFH.

Select episodes of DTFH were adapted into the Netflix animated series The Midnight Gospel, directed by Pendleton Ward. The show is a high-concept postmodern sci-fi sitcom with Trussell's podcast interviews inspiring story dialogue and animation added afterward. Trussell introduced audiences to his professional meditation teacher, David Nichtern (a former student of Trungpa's) through the show.

Trussell also guest-starred as the character Dave, the moth that experiments with neon for the first time on an episode of the HBO animated show Animals.

Trussell's most recent notable endeavor is playing Hippocampus, a physically incapacitated fish-like genius, on the Fox animated series Krapopolis.

== Personal life ==
On December 14, 2012, Trussell announced that he had been diagnosed with testicular cancer. The cancer was successfully treated.

Trussell has a brother named Jeff. His mother, Deneen Fendig, died in 2013.

Trussell has dated fellow comedians Mary Lynn Rajskub and Natasha Leggero, as well as model Cora Keegan.

He married his wife, Erin Trussell, in 2018. On June 27, 2018, Trussell announced on The Joe Rogan Experience podcast that he was going to be a father. He has since had two sons and a daughter.

== Criticism and response to The Elephant Graveyard ==
In 2025, the YouTube video essay channel The Elephant Graveyard included Trussell in a wider critique of the media and comedy ecosystem surrounding Joe Rogan. The A.V. Club described the essay as applying ideas associated with Adam Curtis's HyperNormalisation to the "Rogan-verse", arguing that comedians within Rogan's orbit had developed a self-reinforcing alternative reality. The publication later characterized Elephant Graveyard's broader thesis as describing a "reality distortion field" produced by sycophancy around Rogan and appropriated by political interests.

The essay used Trussell as an example of a perceived contradiction between the countercultural and spiritual identity associated with parts of Rogan's earlier podcast circle and that network's later proximity to wealthy technology executives, investors and political figures. Trussell has long publicly discussed Buddhism, psychedelics, meditation and the Buddhist concept of non-attachment; in interviews he has connected psychedelic experiences with Tibetan Buddhist traditions and described such experiences as temporarily dissolving ordinary structures of identity.

Writing about the controversy, Sam Woolfe argued that Trussell's position illustrated the limits of assuming that psychedelic or spiritual practices necessarily insulate people from social, ideological or political influence. Woolfe contrasted Trussell's earlier warnings that people with political agendas might seek access to Rogan's unusually large audience with his later defense of powerful figures within Rogan's broader social milieu.

More broadly, Elephant Graveyard's criticism portrayed the Rogan-centered podcast ecosystem as an alternative-media network that continued to present itself as independent and anti-establishment while becoming increasingly intertwined with billionaires, technology executives and political actors. Subsequent coverage by The A.V. Club likewise described Elephant Graveyard's work as examining the Rogan universe's relationships with its "billionaire buddies" and connections to some of the world's wealthiest figures.
