= Moth joke =

2009 joke by Norm Macdonald

The moth joke is a 2009 joke told by the Canadian stand-up comedian Norm Macdonald, delivered during an appearance on The Tonight Show with Conan O'Brien. The joke involves a moth who enters a podiatrist's office, tells a Kafkaesque narrative about his family miseries, and, upon being told by the podiatrist that he should see a psychiatrist and asking why he entered his office, responds, "cause the light was on". The joke has been described as a shaggy-dog story that deals with the interactions between nature, culture, misery, existential despair, and the tension between comedy and comics. Commenters have called the moth joke one of Macdonald's best.

== Description ==
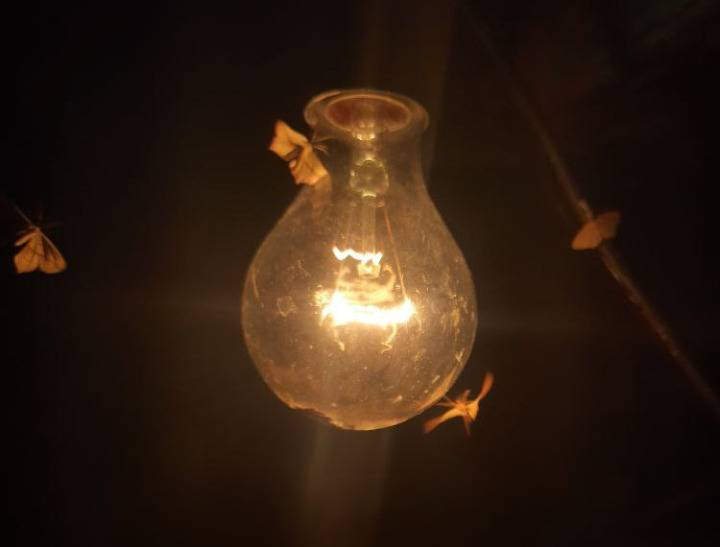
Moths flying near a lightbulb

A podiatrist's office

The comedian Norm Macdonald delivered the moth joke in 2009 during an appearance on The Tonight Show with Conan O'Brien. (Note: According to O'Brien, Macdonald told the joke after O'Brien asked him to do a second segment during the commercial break. O'Brien also said that Macdonald learned the joke from the comedian Colin Quinn, who reportedly told it in 20 seconds.) The joke begins: "A moth goes into a podiatrist's office and the podiatrist's office says, 'What's the problem?'" The moth goes on to tell a "Kafkaesque narrative" about his abusive boss, his inability to love his family, and the death of a child. Following a quip from O'Brien about the length of the joke, Macdonald continues to tell of the moth's mental troubles. The joke ends: "And so the doctor says, 'Moth, man, you're troubled. But you should be seeing a psychiatrist. Why on earth did you come here?' And the moth says, 'cause the light was on.'" Macdonald then "stared at O'Brien, only just perceptibly smirking, while the audience cheered" and O'Brien laughed.

== Analysis ==
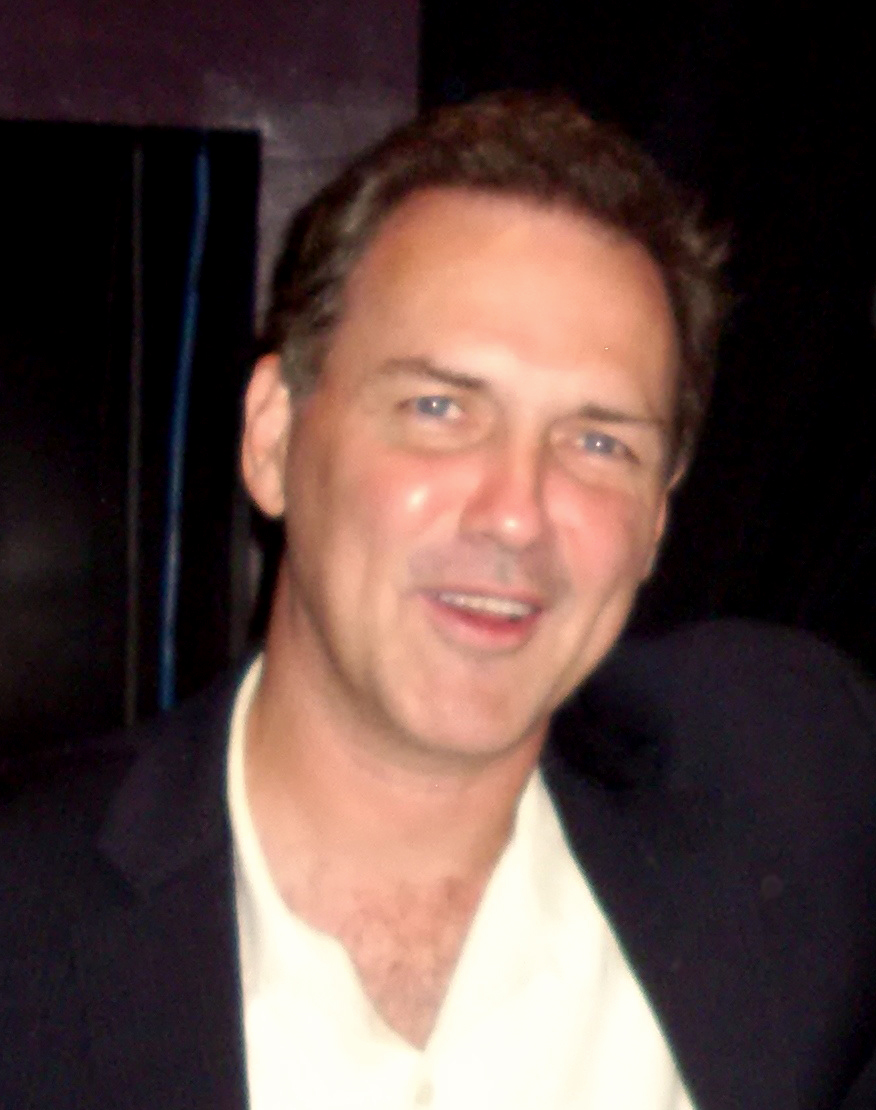
Macdonald in 2009

In The New York Times Magazine, the writer Dan Brooks said that although the moth joke "resembles a shaggy-dog story structurally", its punchline is actually "classical": "It resolves the tension Macdonald has built up by situating the moth within the dynamics of human psychology and misery, slamming us back into joke territory with a reminder that, actually, it's just a moth." By contrast, the scholar Alfie Bown, analyzing the joke with psychoanalytic theory, said that the punchline is funny because "no amount of individual storytelling and lived experience" can overcome "the fact of subjectivity" that "we all fly towards the light". The philosopher and psychoanalyst Julie Reshe said that the joke "epitomizes comedy's capacity to blend absurdity with existential despair". The columnist Matthew Walther noted Macdonald's fondness for Russian literature, describing the joke as "an existentialist shaggy dog story featuring an insect serf driven to despair" by his "overseer" that was clearly influenced by Fyodor Dostoevsky.

The anthropologist Morton Nielsen stated that the moth joke, like "many other iconic Macdonald bits", is funny "in an almost anti-comedic sense" in that it is a "hyper-exaggerated version of [an] outdated joke format" through which Macdonald seeks to "liberate the comedic force from its relation to the comic by pushing the joke towards its own collapse", notwithstanding his "voice and point of view". He contrasted Macdonald's style with those of alt-comics, whose jokes rely upon "expressing their innermost emotional weaknesses and flaws from the stage".

Macdonald rejected calling the moth joke a shaggy-dog story or anti-comedy, stating: "It was a very funny joke and that is why the audience laughed hard and long. They did not laugh because it was a comment on bad jokes and how we all know they are bad. They laughed because it was a very good joke."

== Reception and influence ==
The anthropologist Morten Nielsen, who conducted field research in the New York City stand-up comedy scene, said that some comedians memorized and performed the joke for their own pleasure, while others discussed and analyzed Macdonald's intonation and pacing. Writing for The New York Times, Jason Zinoman called it "one of the great examples of the long form" joke setup, and Kevin Jiang in the Toronto Star said that it was "arguably [Macdonald's] greatest bit".

== Sources ==
- Bown, Alfie (2024). Post-Comedy. Cambridge, U.K.: Polity. ISBN 978-1-509-56339-5.
- Brooks, Dan (August 30, 2018). "Norm Macdonald, still in search of the perfect joke". The New York Times Magazine. Archived from the original on September 2, 2025.
- Jackson, Dory (September 15, 2021). "Norm Macdonald's beloved moth joke from 2009 resurfaces after his death". People. Archived from the original on April 27, 2025.
- Jiang, Kevin (September 14, 2021). "Canadian comedy legend Norm Macdonald's ten greatest moments". Toronto Star. Archived from the original on October 19, 2025.
- McCarthy, Sean (May 12, 2014). "Norm Macdonald: Neither anti-comic nor comic's comic, simply a comic". The Comic's Comic. Archived from the original on October 21, 2025.
- Nielsen, Morten (May 3, 2019). At the fringes of alternative comedy: The straight face of Norm Macdonald. Alternative Comedy Now – via Academia.edu.
- Reshe, Julie (July 10, 2025). "Post-Comedy". Book review. Psychoanalysis, Culture & Society. doi:10.1057/s41282-025-00561-w – via SpringerLink.
- Rowles, Dustin (September 17, 2021). "Conan O'Brien discusses the improvised origins of Norm Macdonald's 'The Moth' joke". Pajiba. Archived from the original on November 14, 2024.
- Walther, Matthew (September 20, 2021). "Norm Macdonald's comedy was quite Christian". The New York Times. Archived from the original on June 22, 2025.
- Zinoman, Jason (January 30, 2025). "Forget the punchline. It's the setup to these jokes that's tricky". The New York Times. Archived from the original on October 12, 2025.
