= No soap, radio =

Surreal joke phrase

"No soap, radio" is a form of practical joke and an example of surreal comedy. The joke is a prank whereby the punch line has no relation to the body of the joke, but participants in the prank pretend otherwise. The effect is either to trick someone into laughing along as if they "get it" or to ridicule them for not understanding.

The joke became popular in New York in the 1950s. The punch line is known for its use as a basic sociological and psychological experiment, specifically relating to mob mentality and the pressure to conform. The basic setup is similar to the Asch conformity experiments, in which people showed a proclivity to agree with a group despite their own judgments.

== Execution of the prank ==
This prank usually requires a teller and two listeners, one of whom is an accomplice who already knows the joke and secretly plays along with the teller. The joke teller says something like, "The elephant and the hippopotamus were taking a bath. And the elephant said to the hippo, 'Please pass the soap.' The hippo replied, 'No soap, radio.'" The accomplice laughs at the punchline, while the second listener is left puzzled. In some cases, the second listener will pretend to understand the joke and laugh along with the others to avoid appearing foolish.

The purpose of the prank is to elicit one of two responses from the victim:

- False understanding – when the victim acts as if the joke is humorous, when in fact the victim does not understand the joke at all.
- Negative understanding – when the victim expresses confusion about what the joke means and feels left out (e.g., "I don't get it"). The conspirators are now prepared to mock the victim for the victim's "inability to get it".

Sometimes, if the second listener does not respond right away, there is an "explanation" of the joke to the second listener, which involves the teller and the first listener emphasizing words or elongating pauses, but providing no further information, e.g. "Don't you get it? No soooap... radio!"

Other examples of the joke:

- A woman goes into her bathroom and is shocked to find an elephant in her bathtub. She asks the elephant, "What are you doing in my bathtub?" The elephant responds, "No soap, radio!"
- Two polar bears are sitting in a bathtub. The first one says, "Pass the soap." The second one says, "No soap, radio!"
- A foreign man is flying in an airplane. He points out of the window at the unfamiliar countryside below and exclaims, "No soap... radio?"

== Origin ==
The phrase no soap possibly originated around 1860 when it was first recorded, meaning "I haven't any money" or "I will not lend you money". Its contemporary connotation is "not a chance" or "nothing doing". However, the phrase itself was being employed in an absurd and humorous context as early as the 1750s, when it appeared in a well-known piece of literary nonsense by English dramatist and actor Samuel Foote in order to test the memory of a rival: "So she went into the garden to cut a cabbage-leaf to make an apple-pie; and at the same time a great she-bear, coming up the street, pops its head into the shop. 'What! No soap?' So he died, and she very imprudently married the barber..."

Eric Partridge and William Safire dated the phrase to the 1930s or 1940s.

== Comedy ==
As a practical joke, the trick is an example of anti-humor or surreal comedy. The scenario resulting from false understanding is a demonstration of groupthink and peer pressure – the desire to conform to one's peers – despite the fact that the entire joke has no hidden meaning, nothing to "get" and no punchline.

== Popular culture ==
The joke has become widely known and entered popular culture in other forms, including a radio show named "No Soap-Radio!" It has been used as the name for rock bands, as well as a short-lived TV sketch comedy show (No Soap, Radio) starring Steve Guttenberg that aired on ABC in spring 1982. No Soap Radio was also the name of a radio commercial production company in New York City formed in 1970, later renamed No Soap Productions.

In the episode of The Simpsons "Homer the Heretic", a radio is seen hanging in the shower, with a label on it showing the brand of radio to be "No Soap— Radio!"

In "Pie-O-My", the fifth episode of the fourth season of The Sopranos, the name of the band playing at The Crazy Horse is No Soap Radio.

In "Brain Scramblies", the third episode of the second season of What We Do in the Shadows, the vampires' human neighbor Sean exclaims "No soap, Radio!" during an imaginary phone conversation after being "over-hypnotized."

== See also ==
- Mornington Crescent
- Shaggy dog story
- List of practical joke topics
