= Neil Macdonald =

Canadian journalist (born 1957)

- Born: 1957 (age 68–69); Quebec City, Quebec, Canada
- Education: Algonquin College
- Occupation: Journalist
- Spouse: Joyce Napier
- Relatives: Norm Macdonald (brother)

Neil Macdonald (born 1957) is a Canadian journalist with the Canadian Broadcasting Corporation, and a former senior correspondent for CBC News The National. He is married to former CTV News bureau Chief and current ambassador Joyce Napier.

== Early life and family ==
Macdonald was born and raised in Quebec City. His father was Percy Macdonald, who served with the Canadian Army during World War II and helped liberate the Netherlands. His mother is Ferne Macdonald (née Mains). He has two brothers, one of whom was comedian/actor Norm Macdonald. He is married to Joyce Napier, a former parliamentary bureau chief for CTV News.

== Career ==
After graduating from Algonquin College in Ottawa, Macdonald worked first as a print journalist. He joined the CBC in 1988 and covered Canadian Parliament for approximately a decade. He then served for five years (1998–2003) as the network's chief Middle East correspondent.

Macdonald was involved in a public dispute with Canadian media mogul Leonard Asper in 2003. Asper had accused Macdonald of being "anti-Israeli" after taking exception to some of the CBC's Middle East coverage. Macdonald responded with a rebuttal in The Globe and Mail, accusing Asper of defamation and alleging editorial censorship in the Asper-owned CanWest media outlets.

In November 2010, Macdonald led a CBC investigation into the United Nations International Independent Investigation Commission and the Special Tribunal for Lebanon, which had been mandated with solving the murder of former Lebanese Prime Minister Rafik Hariri. The report uncovered documents suggesting the UN investigative body had strong evidence to link the Shia paramilitary group Hezbollah to the 2005 bombing that killed Hariri, and that the UN had not acted on this intelligence due to diplomatic concerns. Macdonald's report also sharply criticized the performance of the Special Tribunal's head prosecutor, Daniel Bellemare, who responded that he was "extremely disappointed" with the report.

In 2014, Macdonald harshly criticized Linden MacIntyre, a former CBC employee, after MacIntyre made comments about the CBC in regard to the Jian Ghomeshi incident.

In 2015, Macdonald moved back to Canada after 17 years in the United States, 12 of which he spent in Washington, D.C. as the Washington bureau correspondent for The National. Macdonald produced editorial articles for the CBC's website, as well as appearing as a senior correspondent for The National before he retired in December 2019.

== Awards ==
In 1988, Macdonald received a Centre for Investigative Journalism Award honorable mention for the 1987 story "CSIS: Making a cop into a spy just doesn't fly" in the Ottawa Citizen.

In 2004, Macdonald received a Gemini Award for his reportage on political violence in Haiti. He was awarded a second "best reportage" Gemini in 2009 for his coverage of the 2008 financial crisis.
