= Norm Macdonald Has a Show =

American television talk show

- Genre: Talk show
- Directed by: Gene Bernard
- Presented by: Norm Macdonald
- Starring: Adam Eget
- Composers: Tim Blane; Jeff Martin
- Country of origin: United States
- Original language: English
- No. of seasons: 1
- No. of episodes: 10

Production
- Executive producers: Lori Jo Hoekstra; Norm Macdonald; K.P. Anderson; Daniel Kellison
- Producers: Charlie Gerencer; Melissa Ocampo
- Running time: 26–35 minutes
- Production companies: Anchor Spud Productions; Pygmy Wolf Productions; Lionsgate Television

Original release
- Network: Netflix
- Release: September 14, 2018

Related
- Norm Macdonald Live

Norm Macdonald Has a Show is an American talk show hosted by Norm Macdonald that premiered on Netflix on September 14, 2018. It was produced by Macdonald, Lori Jo Hoekstra, K.P. Anderson and Daniel Kellison. Macdonald and Hoekstra were also its showrunners.

== Production ==
On March 9, 2018, Netflix announced it had ordered a ten-episode season of a show hosted by Norm Macdonald and accompanied by sidekick Adam Eget. Macdonald and Lori Jo Hoekstra were its showrunners and executive producers, alongside K.P. Anderson and Daniel Kellison. Macdonald's production company, Anchor Spud Productions, produced the show in association with Pygmy Wolf Productions and Lionsgate Television. David Letterman jokingly referred to himself as a location scout for the show's press release, but was a creative partner and helped sell the show to Netflix and is credited as "Special Counsel". It premiered on September 14, 2018.

The cast closed each episode by singing the same song Wayne and Shuster used to close their CBC program in the 1970s.

On July 9, 2019, Netflix canceled the show after one season.

== Episodes ==
| No. | Featured guest | Original release date |
|---|---|---|
| 1 | "David Spade" | September 14, 2018 |
Norm's former "SNL" co-star David Spade talks about his first time on the "Tonight Show," snorting B12 for a movie role, "Just Shoot Me" and more.
| 2 | "Drew Barrymore" | September 14, 2018 |
Drew Barrymore joins Norm to discuss her childhood and career, as well as vampires, unsolicited pictures from guys, sunsets, animals and much more.
| 3 | "Judge Judy" | September 14, 2018 |
Judge Judy Sheindlin discusses her love of Paul Newman, being on a cruise with Judge Wapner, her philosophy about financial generosity and more.
| 4 | "David Letterman" | September 14, 2018 |
David Letterman chats with Norm about his beard, communicating with his son, his brief stint on a failed variety show and why he never hosted "SNL."
| 5 | "Jane Fonda" | September 14, 2018 |
Jane Fonda and Norm chat about aging, her husbands, her struggle with faith, her portrayal of Nancy Reagan and Levon Helm's barn.
| 6 | "Chevy Chase" | September 14, 2018 |
Chevy Chase and Norm bond over their shared "Weekend Update" experience and talk about "Caddyshack," "Three Amigos" and the challenge of live TV.
| 7 | "M. Night Shyamalan" | September 14, 2018 |
M. Night Shyamalan opens up about being an artist in an Indian family of doctors, how he got into Hollywood and the balance between instinct and craft.
| 8 | "Michael Keaton" | September 14, 2018 |
Michael Keaton pitches a country music tour to Norm, and discusses his encounters with Van Morrison, film noir and coming up as a stand-up comic.
| 9 | "Billy Joe Shaver" | September 14, 2018 |
Outlaw country legend Billy Joe Shaver performs and talks to Norm about his country friends and heroes and something called a "two-hole outhouse."
| 10 | "Lorne Michaels" | September 14, 2018 |
"SNL" creator Lorne Michaels looks back at SNL's history, the "cold open" concept, the honesty of live TV, the Sinéad O'Connor incident and more.
