= Shaggy dog =

(The) shaggy dog may refer to:

== Arts and entertainment ==
- Shaggy Dog (play), a 1968 television play by Dennis Potter
- The Shaggy Dog (1959 film), starring Fred MacMurray and Tommy Kirk
  - The Shaggy Dog (1994 film), a made-for-TV remake starring Ed Begley, Jr. and Scott Weinger
  - The Shaggy Dog (2006 film), a Disney live-action theatrical remake starring Tim Allen
  - The Return of the Shaggy Dog, a 1987 American two-part made-for-television comedy film produced by Walt Disney Television
- Shaggydog, the direwolf companion of Rickon Stark in the A Song of Ice and Fire fictional universe

== See also ==
- Shaggy dog story, a type of story or joke
