= Joyce Napier =

Canadian journalist (born 1958)

Her Excellency Joyce Napier CM

Ambassador to the Holy See
- Incumbent
- Assumed office May 8, 2024
- Prime Minister: Justin Trudeau; Mark Carney
- Preceded by: Paul Gibbard

Personal details
- Born: June 15, 1957 (age 69) Montreal, Quebec
- Spouse: Neil Macdonald
- Relatives: Norm Macdonald (brother-in-law)
- Occupation: Television journalist

Joyce Napier CM (born June 15, 1958) is a Canadian diplomat and former television journalist, currently serving as Canada's ambassador to the Holy See. Formerly a correspondent for the news division of Société Radio-Canada, the French-language arm of the Canadian Broadcasting Corporation, she became, in March 2016, the parliamentary bureau chief for CTV News.

Born in Montreal, Quebec to Egyptian immigrants, she spent her childhood in Europe where her father worked for the Encyclopædia Britannica. She returned to Montreal to study journalism.

She began her career as a print journalist, working as a Montreal correspondent for The Globe and Mail and Canadian Press before joining the Montreal newspaper La Presse as a reporter. She began working for CBMT as a television reporter in 1989. Around the same time, she married Neil Macdonald, a reporter with the English division of CBC News. She first joined the CBC's French service in 1992 as part of a project within the CBC, in which she and Radio-Canada journalist Pierre Mignault exchanged jobs for a year in order to provide the CBC with staff input regarding the different organizational cultures of the two divisions.

During the 1995 Quebec referendum, Napier asked Bloc Québécois Member of Parliament Suzanne Tremblay to explain the "Yes" side's assertion that Quebec would be better able to support and protect francophone language rights in Canada as an independent country than as a Canadian province. In response, Tremblay asserted that Napier's non-French surname, and the fact that she spoke French with a Continental rather than Québécois accent, meant that Napier lacked the requisite knowledge of Quebec history to understand that the answer was self-evident and did not need to be explained. Tremblay subsequently apologized for the remark.

Napier was named Radio-Canada's Middle East correspondent in 1998, at the same time as Macdonald was assigned to the same role with the CBC's English division. In 2003, Macdonald and Napier were both reassigned by their respective networks to the Washington, D.C., bureau. In 2005, Napier conducted the first media interview granted by Karla Homolka after her release from prison.

Napier announced that she was taking a one-year sabbatical from the network in May 2014. She returned in August 2015 as a correspondent in the network's national parliamentary bureau in Ottawa, Ontario, before transferring to CTV in 2016. Napier was let go from CTV on June 14, 2023, along with several other high-profile CTV journalists primarily stationed outside of Canada, in a round of job cuts consisting of 1300 Bell Media employees nationwide.
