= Shaggy dog story =

Story with long setup and no payoff

In its original sense, a shaggy-dog story or yarn is an extremely long-winded anecdote characterized by extensive narration of typically irrelevant incidents and terminated by an anticlimax. In other words, it is a long story that is intended to be amusing and that has an intentionally silly or meaningless ending.

Shaggy-dog stories play upon the audience's preconceptions of joke-telling. The audience listens to the story with certain expectations, which are either simply not met or met in some entirely unexpected manner. A lengthy shaggy-dog story derives its humour from the fact that the joke-teller held the attention of the listeners for a long time (such jokes can take five minutes or more to tell) for no reason at all, as the long-awaited resolution is essentially meaningless, with the joke as a whole playing upon people's search for meaning. The nature of their delivery is reflected in the English idiom spin a yarn, by way of analogy with the production of yarn.

As a comic device, the shaggy-dog story is related to unintentional long-windedness, and the two are sometimes both referred to in the same way. While a shaggy-dog story is a comic exaggeration of the real life experience, it is also deliberately constructed to play off an audience who are expecting a comic payoff and uses that expectation to subvert and instead create comedy in unexpected ways. In this kind of humorous story, the humor lies in the pointlessness or irrelevance of the plot or punch line.

Humanities scholar Jane Marie Todd observed that the shaggy-dog story demonstrates the nature of desiring humor and how that process occurs.

== Archetypal story ==
The eponymous shaggy dog story serves as the archetype of the genre. The story builds up a repeated emphasizing of the dog's exceptional shagginess. The climax of the story culminates in a character reacting to the animal by stating: "That dog's not so shaggy." The expectations of the audience that have been built up by the presentation of the story, both in the details (that the dog is shaggy) and in the delivery of a punchline, are thus subverted. Ted Cohen gives the following example of this story:

A boy owned a dog that was uncommonly shaggy. Many people remarked upon its considerable shagginess. When the boy learned that there are contests for shaggy dogs, he entered his dog. The dog won first prize for shagginess in both the local and the regional competitions. The boy entered the dog in ever-larger contests, until finally he entered it in the world championship for shaggy dogs. When the judges had inspected all of the competing dogs, they remarked about the boy's dog: "He's not that shaggy."

However, authorities disagree as to whether this particular story is the archetype after which the category is named. Eric Partridge provides another story, similar to one recalled in The Morris Dictionary of Word and Phrase Origins by William and Mary Morris. According to Partridge and the Morrises, the archetypal shaggy-dog story involves an advertisement placed in the Times announcing a search for a shaggy dog. In the Partridge story, an aristocratic family living in Park Lane is searching for a lost dog, and an American answers the advertisement with a shaggy dog that he has found and personally brought across the Atlantic, only to be received by the butler at the end of the story who takes one look at the dog and shuts the door in his face, saying, "But not so shaggy as that, sir!" In the Morris story, the advertiser is organizing a competition to find the shaggiest dog in the world, and after a lengthy exposition of the search for such a dog, a winner is presented to the aristocratic instigator of the competition, who says, "I don't think he's so shaggy."

== Examples in literature ==
Isaac Asimov's short story "Shah Guido G.", found in his collection Buy Jupiter and Other Stories, is identified by the author as a shaggy-dog story, and he explains that the title is wordplay on "shaggy dog".

== Examples in music ==
- Arlo Guthrie's antiwar "Alice's Restaurant Massacree" is a shaggy-dog story about the military draft, hippies, and improper disposal of garbage.
- "Weird Al" Yankovic's "Albuquerque", the final track on his 1999 album Running with Scissors, is an over-11-minute digression from one of the first topics mentioned in the song, the narrator-protagonist's longstanding dislike of sauerkraut.
- The J. Geils Band's "No Anchovies, Please", on their 1980 album Love Stinks, is a shaggy-dog story that tells the tale of an American housewife who meets an unfortunate fate after opening a can of anchovies.

== Other examples ==
- Myles-na-gCopaleen, one of the pen-names of Brian O'Nolan, was a master of long shaggy-dog stories, most commonly in his Various Lives of Keats and Chapman stories in his Irish Times column the Cruisceann Lawn. Almost all the stories would have meandering, painful, often esoteric detail, leading to a meaningless ending to justify a dreadful yet amusing pun or spoonerism, the more excruciating the better. Indeed, the name and characters of the column, based on the poets Keats and Chapman, derive from the first such story where John Keats, in addition to his poetical gifts, is somehow reckoned an expert veterinarian, to whom a prize homing pigeon belonging to George Chapman is brought, choking. Keats opens the bird's beak widely, stares down for some seconds, deftly removes a piece of stuck champagne cork from the bird's throat, and health is restored to Chapman's pigeon. Upon which happy event, Keats is moved to write his famous sonnet "On First Looking into Chapman's Homer" (homer being slang for homing pigeon, as well as the name of the great Greek poet for whom Keats' poem was actually written).
- In animated TV series The Simpsons, the character Grampa Simpson frequently tells nonsensical shaggy-dog stories, often to the annoyance of other characters. In the season 4 episode "Last Exit to Springfield," Grampa tells Mr. Burns that he uses "stories that don't go anywhere" as a strike-breaking technique before launching into a rambling tale.
- In the novel V. by Thomas Pynchon, the main character Benny Profane recalls a shaggy-dog story about a boy who is born with a golden screw in his belly button, the only purpose of which turns out to be to hold the boy's bottom in place.
- "You're Not a Monk" is a Boy Scouts of America campfire story. The storyteller tells a 10-minute long story about a man who goes through a long series of trials to become a monk in hopes of gaining permission to learn a mysterious secret, and at the end, the storyteller refuses to tell the audience what the secret is because "you aren't a monk."
- Comedian Norm Macdonald told multiple famous shaggy-dog stories, mostly during appearances on The Tonight Show with Conan O'Brien and Conan O'Brien's later talk show Conan, that went viral after Macdonald's death. In 2010, after unexpectedly being asked to appear for a second seven-minute segment on The Tonight Show, having only prepared material for one, Macdonald told the "moth joke". Improvising, he expanded a 20-second Colin Quinn joke about moths being attracted to light into a kafkaesque that has been compared to the storytelling of Fyodor Dostoevsky and Anton Chekhov. During a May 2014 Conan appearance, Macdonald told a 3-minute joke about "Jaques De Gatineau" culminating in a pun, which sidekick Andy Richter described as "like taking somebody on a four-mile hike to show you a dog turd". In 2016 on The Howard Stern Show, Macdonald told the 9-minute-long "Dirty Johnny" joke.
- In Mark Twain's book Roughing It, the story of "Grandfather's Old Ram" starts with the story of the ram, detailing various humorous episodes, but never reaching a conclusion. The narrator falls asleep. What happened to the ram is never revealed.

== See also ==
- Anti-humor
- The Aristocrats
- Chekhov's gun
- Feghoot
- Information overload
- No soap radio
- Rakugo
- Red herring
- Shaggy dog (disambiguation)
- Shaggy God story
