= Norm Macdonald Live =

Comedy podcast (2013–2017)

- Norm Macdonald Live logo
- Genre: Comedy; Talk
- Format: Audio; video
- Language: English

Creative team
- Created by: Norm Macdonald
- Directed by: Brent Butler

Cast and voices
- Hosted by: Norm Macdonald; Adam Eget

Production
- Production: Daniel Kellison
- Length: 1 hour

Publication
- No. of episodes: 39
- Original release: March 26, 2013 – October 3, 2017
- Provider: Jash

Norm Macdonald Live is a discontinued weekly audio and video podcast hosted by Canadian stand-up comedian, writer and actor Norm Macdonald. The Comedy Store's Adam Eget served as the show's co-host, with former Late Show with David Letterman producer Daniel Kellison as executive producer.

The show featured interviews with comedians, actors, and other members of the entertainment community, and ran for three seasons. Launched by the Video Podcast Network on March 26, 2013, and then produced by Jash, the show was also distributed on YouTube, Amazon Prime, and PlutoTV, with audio-only versions of the episodes uploaded via iTunes. On February 16, 2018, archived episodes of the show were taken off YouTube, followed by most major digital platforms.

Norm Macdonald Has a Show, a spiritual successor to Norm Macdonald Live starring Macdonald and Eget, was released on Netflix on September 14, 2018.

== Background ==
The first season premiered on March 26, 2013, and concluded after eleven episodes. After a year-long hiatus, the second season debuted on May 12, 2014. It concluded after thirteen episodes in August 2014.

A third season was released in September and October 2016, but only two episodes were aired before going on hiatus. On July 25, 2017, the season continued with guest David Letterman. The recommencement of the third season featured a brand-new set as well as a new style of filming that seemed to prefer close-up camera shots on subjects rather than the traditional medium close-up.

== Format ==
The podcast followed a talk show format without a studio audience. Each hour-long episode features opening remarks between Macdonald and co-host Adam Eget, often involving elaborate comedic bits and irreverent chit-chat, leading into a guest interview. The show concludes with a segment called "Jokes" in which the hosts and their guest take turns reading one-liners from index cards.

== Episodes ==
=== Season one ===
No. overall	No. in season	Release date	Subject
1	1	March 26, 2013	Bob Einstein (as Super Dave Osborne)
2	2	April 2, 2013	Tom Green
3	3	April 9, 2013	Fred Stoller
4	4	April 16, 2013	Russell Brand
5	5	April 23, 2013	Billy Bob Thornton
6	6	April 30, 2013	Larry King
7	7	May 7, 2013	Kevin Nealon
8	8	May 14, 2013	Simon Helberg
9	9	May 21, 2013	Nick Swardson
10	10	May 27, 2013	Andy Dick
11	11	June 11, 2013	Gilbert Gottfried – Part 1
12	12	June 17, 2013	Gilbert Gottfried – Part 2

=== Season two ===
No. overall	No. in season	Release date	Subject
13	1	May 12, 2014	Ray Romano
14	2	May 21, 2014	Adam Sandler
15	3	May 26, 2014	David Spade
16	4	June 2, 2014	Carl Reiner
17	5	June 9, 2014	Fred Willard
18	6	June 16, 2014	Todd Glass – Part 1
19	7	June 25, 2014	Todd Glass – Part 2
20	8	June 30, 2014	Bob Saget
21	9	July 7, 2014	David Koechner
22	10	July 14, 2014	Roseanne Barr
23	11	July 21, 2014	Marc Maron
24	12	July 28, 2014	Martin Mull
25	13	August 7, 2014	Jack Carter

=== Season three ===
No. overall	No. in season	Release date	Subject
26	1	September 15, 2016	Stephen Merchant
27	2	September 26, 2016	Bill Hader
28	3	July 25, 2017	David Letterman
29	4	August 1, 2017	Mike Tyson
30	5	August 8, 2017	Bobby Lee
31	6	August 15, 2017	Sarah Silverman – Part 1
32	7	August 15, 2017	Sarah Silverman – Part 2
33	8	August 22, 2017	Dana Carvey
34	9	August 29, 2017	Jerry Seinfeld
35	10	September 5, 2017	Caitlyn Jenner
36	11	September 12, 2017	Rich Little
37	12	September 19, 2017	Margaret Cho
38	13	September 26, 2017	Tim Allen
39	14	October 3, 2017	Jim Carrey

=== Specials ===
In the spirit of the Sports Show with Norm Macdonald, Norm and co-hosts Jeff Martin and Chad Drew live-streamed their coverage of the US Masters golf tournament over several hours in 2013, and again in 2015.

The show featured special call-in guests, including Sid Youngers, Josh Gardner and Bob Einstein.

Episode	Release date	Subject
1	April 13, 2013	The 2013 Masters with Norm Macdonald – Day 1
2	April 14, 2013	The 2013 Masters with Norm Macdonald – Day 2
3	April 11, 2015	The 2015 Masters with Norm Macdonald – Day 1
4	April 12, 2015	The 2015 Masters with Norm Macdonald – Day 2

== Critical reception ==
Reviews for the series were positive, with warm notices from USA Today and Entertainment Weekly. Darren Staley of America's Comedy wrote "The show is at all times smart, unpredictable, thought-provoking, and funny as hell," arguing that "It's the best podcast out there right now." Writing for IFC, Ron Mwangaguhunga called Macdonald "a comedic force with which to be reckoned," noting that the show was "a bit rough around the edges," in its first episode.
