= Norm Macdonald =

Canadian comedian (1959–2021)

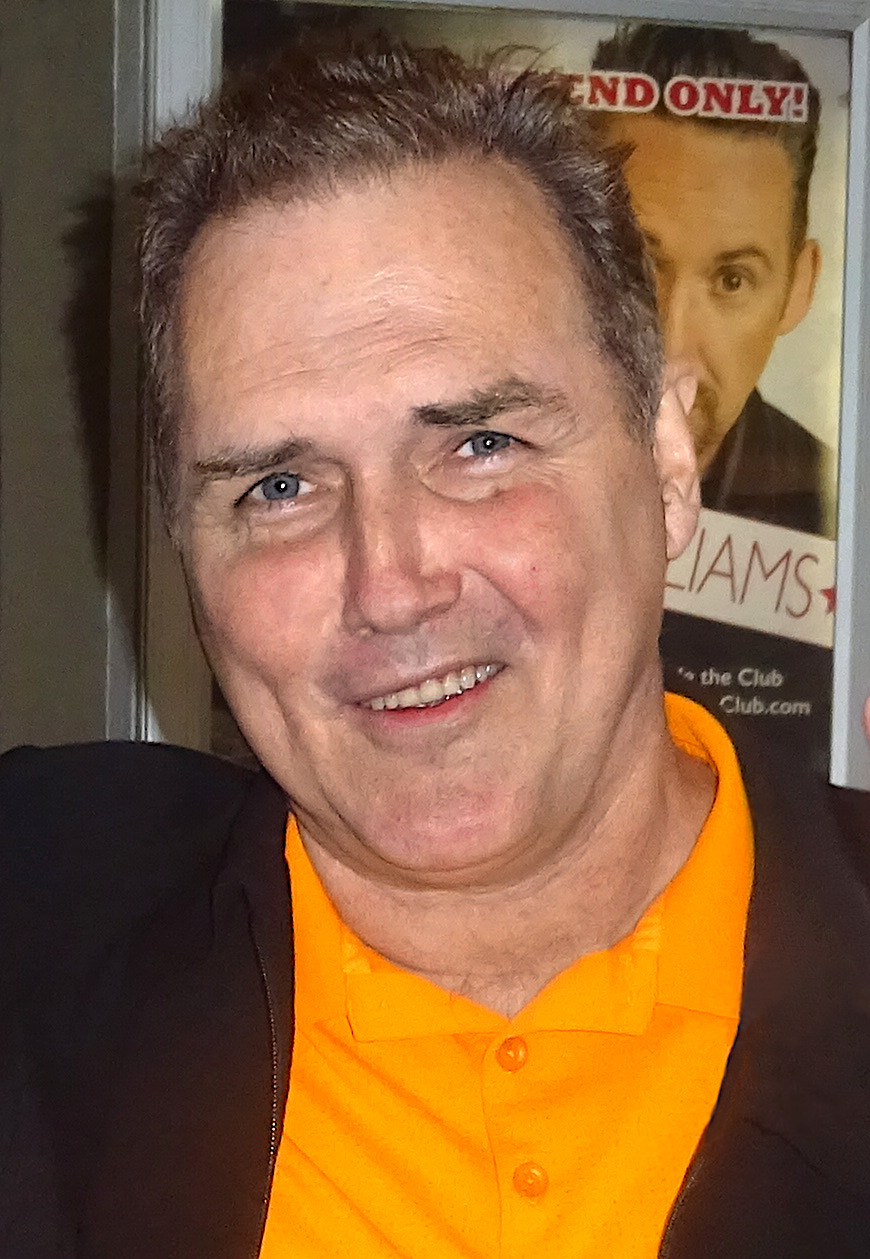
- Macdonald in 2016
- Born: Norman Gene Macdonald; October 17, 1959; Quebec City, Quebec, Canada
- Died: September 14, 2021 (aged 61); Duarte, California, U.S.
- Spouse: Connie Vaillancourt (m. 1988; div. 1999)
- Children: 1
- Relatives: Neil Macdonald (older brother); Leslie Macdonald (younger brother); Joyce Napier (sister-in-law)

Comedy career
- Years active: 1985–2021
- Medium: Stand-up; television; film; literature
- Genres: Observational comedy; deadpan; non-sequitur; black comedy; insult comedy; shaggy dog story; political satire

Norman Gene Macdonald (Note: The capitalization of Norm Macdonald's surname has been inconsistently reported in publications such as TV Guide. Books that discuss him, such as Shales (2003) and Crawford (2000), as well as other sources such as the Game Show Network and Comedy Central's Sports Show with Norm Macdonald, all consistently report "Macdonald" (lowercase "d") as his surname.) (October 17, 1959 (Note: One of the standard references that erroneously gives his date of birth as October 17, 1963, is "Norm Macdonald". TV Guide. Archived from the original on September 9, 2015.) – September 14, 2021) was a Canadian stand-up comedian, actor, and writer whose style was characterized by deadpan delivery, eccentric understatement, and the use of folksy, old-fashioned turns of phrase. He appeared in numerous films and was a frequent guest on late-night talk shows, where he developed a reputation for his chaotic yet understated comedic style. His appearances on Conan O'Brien's and David Letterman's programs were especially well-received, with the latter describing him as "the best" stand-up comedian.

Earlier in his career, Macdonald's first work on television included writing for comedies such as Roseanne and The Dennis Miller Show. In 1993, Macdonald was hired as a writer and cast member on Saturday Night Live (SNL), spending a total of five seasons on the series, which included anchoring the show's Weekend Update segment for three and a half seasons. He made his movie debut as Frank in Billy Madison (1995). Macdonald was removed as host of SNL's Weekend Update in 1998, allegedly for relentlessly mocking O. J. Simpson during his murder trial, offending producer Don Ohlmeyer, who was a close friend of Simpson. After being fired from SNL, he wrote and starred in the 1998 film Dirty Work and headlined his own sitcom, The Norm Show, from 1999 to 2001. Macdonald was also a voice actor, and provided voice acting roles for Family Guy, The Fairly OddParents, Mike Tyson Mysteries, The Orville, and the Dr. Dolittle films.

Between 2013 and 2018, Macdonald hosted the talk shows Norm Macdonald Live (a video podcast) and Norm Macdonald Has a Show (a Netflix series), on which he interviewed comedians and other celebrities. In 2016, he authored Based on a True Story, a novel that presented a heavily fictionalized account of his life. Macdonald died of leukemia in September 2021, a condition he had not publicly disclosed.

== Early life ==
Norman Gene Macdonald was born on October 17, 1959, in Quebec City, Quebec. His parents, Ferne (née Mains) and Percy Lloyd Macdonald (1916–1990), were both Anglophone teachers who came from Glengarry County in eastern Ontario. Norm and his brother Neil spent their summers on the family farm between Avonmore and Monkland, Ontario. Their parents worked at CFB Valcartier, a military base north of Quebec City. As a child, his father would not let him learn French (despite Quebec's strict language laws regarding French) because he wanted the family to speak English. Macdonald's father died in 1990 of heart disease. Macdonald described himself as being "half-Scottish and half-Irish".

He attended Quebec High School before his family moved to Ottawa, Ontario. In Ottawa, Macdonald attended Gloucester High School, graduating early at the age of 14 years old. After high school, he enrolled at Carleton University, where he studied mathematics and philosophy before dropping out. Macdonald was later also briefly enrolled in Algonquin College's programs for journalism and broadcasting-television, following in his elder brother, Neil Macdonald's, footsteps. Between periods of school and before starting in comedy, he worked a variety of manual labour jobs, including as a chokerman for a logging company.

== Career ==
Macdonald's first performances in comedy were at stand-up clubs in Ottawa, when he regularly appeared on amateur nights at Yuk Yuk's in 1985. Not appreciating how well his first performance at the club had gone, he bolted out, saying he would never do it again. The club's owner, Howard Wagman, had to persuade him to come back for more. Eventually, his confidence grew. Six months later, he performed at the 1986 Just for Laughs Festival in Montreal, and he was heralded by the Montreal Gazette as "one of this country's hottest comics". A number of sources reported he recovered from stomach cancer in 1986.

In August 1989, 29-year-old Macdonald made his U.S. network television debut by appearing on The Pat Sajak Show. Over the following seven months, he would go on to make five more appearances on the show. By 1990, he performed as a contestant on Star Search. He also appeared on Late Night with David Letterman in May 1990, and the host became a huge fan, saying: "If we could have, we would have had Norm on every week". In 1992, Macdonald served as a writer for the only season of The Dennis Miller Show, working on a staff that also included Barry Crimmins, Nick Bakay, John Riggi, Eddie Feldmann, and Mark Brazill. He was hired as a writer for television sitcom Roseanne for the 1992–93 season before quitting to join Saturday Night Live.

=== 1993–1998: Saturday Night Live ===
Macdonald joined the cast of NBC's Saturday Night Live (SNL) television program in 1993, where he performed impressions of Larry King, Burt Reynolds, David Letterman, Quentin Tarantino, Clint Eastwood, Charles Kuralt, and Bob Dole, among others. The following year, during the show's twentieth season, Macdonald began anchoring the news satire segment Weekend Update.

His version of Weekend Update often included running jokes about prison rape, "crack whores", and the success of American actor-singer David Hasselhoff in Germany. Macdonald would occasionally deliver a piece of news before taking out his personal compact tape recorder and leaving a "note to self" relevant to what he just discussed. He commonly used actor-singer Frank Stallone as a non-sequitur punchline and absurdly blamed him for such events as toxic waste or high unemployment rates. Frank Stallone took no offence, later stating: "He wasn't really attacking me, it was just randomly thrown in there". Nonetheless, Macdonald stopped the Frank Stallone jokes after a 1997 request from Sylvester Stallone, Frank's brother, who was guest host on SNL.

On the Weekend Update aired on February 24, 1996, Macdonald joked about John Lotter's sentencing for the murders of Brandon Teena and two others:

And finally, in Falls City, Nebraska, John Lotter has been sentenced to death for attempting to kill three people in what prosecutors called a plot to silence a cross-dressing female who had accused him of rape. Now, this might strike some viewers as harsh, but I believe everyone involved in this story should die.

The comments were met with sharp criticism from activist groups, including The Transexual Menace, who threatened to picket SNL. Upon reviewing the show, NBC agreed the line was inappropriate and should not have aired, and said it would ensure that similar incidents would not happen in the future.

After the announcement that Michael Jackson and Lisa Marie Presley planned to divorce, Macdonald joked on Weekend Update about their irreconcilable differences. "According to friends, the two were never a good match. She's more of a stay-at-home type, and he's more of a homosexual pedophile." He followed this up a few episodes later with a report about the singer's collapse and hospitalization. Referring to a report that Jackson had decorated his hospital room with giant photographs of Shirley Temple, Macdonald added: "But don't get any ideas: Michael Jackson is a homosexual pedophile."

==== Leaving Saturday Night Live ====
In early 1998, Don Ohlmeyer, president of NBC's West Coast division, had Macdonald removed as Weekend Update anchor, citing a decline in ratings and a drop-off in quality. He was replaced by Colin Quinn at the Weekend Update desk beginning with the January 10, 1998, episode.

Macdonald said at the time that the true reason for his dismissal was his series of O. J. Simpson jokes during and after the trial because he frequently called him a murderer; Ohlmeyer was a good friend of Simpson and supported him during the proceedings. After being removed from the role, Macdonald went on CBS's Late Show with David Letterman and Howard Stern's syndicated radio show. In both appearances, the hosts accused Ohlmeyer of firing Macdonald for making jokes about Simpson. The jokes were written primarily by Macdonald and longtime SNL writer Jim Downey, who was fired from SNL at the same time. Downey pointed out in an interview that Ohlmeyer threw a party for the jurors who acquitted Simpson.

Ohlmeyer claimed that Macdonald was mistaken, pointing out he had not censored Jay Leno's many jokes about Simpson on The Tonight Show. Ohlmeyer stated he was concerned that ratings research showed people turning away from the program during Macdonald's segment; likewise, network insiders told the New York Daily News that Ohlmeyer and other executives had tried several times to get Macdonald to try a different approach on Update.

Macdonald remained on SNL as a cast member, but he disliked performing in regular sketches. On February 28, 1998, in one of his last appearances on SNL, he played the host of a fictitious TV series titled Who's More Grizzled? who asked questions from "mountain men", played by that night's host Garth Brooks and special guest Robert Duvall. In the sketch, Brooks's character says to Macdonald's character, "I don't much care for you," to which Macdonald replies, "A lot of people don't." He was dismissed shortly thereafter.

The situation reignited in early June 1998, when Ohlmeyer prevented NBC from airing advertisements from Metro-Goldwyn-Mayer for Macdonald's new film Dirty Work out of retaliation for what he saw as Macdonald's disparaging of SNL and NBC with Letterman and Stern. Robert Wright, Ohlmeyer's boss, later overturned the decision not to show ads for the movie on NBC but did leave in place the ban on playing it during SNL. Macdonald continued to insist that he did not personally dislike Ohlmeyer but that Ohlmeyer hated him.

Macdonald complained to the New York Daily News about NBC's removal of advertising for his film, calling Ohlmeyer a "liar and a thug." He claimed never to have badmouthed SNL or Michaels, who he felt had always supported him. Macdonald pointed out that he had taken issue only with Ohlmeyer, whereas the people taking shots at NBC and SNL were Letterman, who wanted Macdonald to come to CBS, and Stern, who wanted him to join his show opposite SNL. Macdonald also asserted that Ohlmeyer's influence had resulted in the cancellation of promotional appearances for his film on WNBC's Today in New York, NBC's Late Night with Conan O'Brien, and the syndicated Access Hollywood (a joint venture between 20th Century Television and NBC). The shows that Macdonald named denied being influenced by Ohlmeyer. Macdonald said Ohlmeyer was "about a thousand times more powerful than I am. It's difficult for anybody to take my side in this. This guy should get a life, man."

Members of the media found irony in the situation, as Dirty Work was promoted as a "revenge comedy." When an interviewer pointed this out, Macdonald said, "It would be good revenge if everybody went and saw this movie if they want to get revenge against Don Ohlmeyer for trying to ban my ads." In a Late Show with David Letterman interview, Macdonald stated that after being dismissed from anchoring Weekend Update and leaving SNL, he could not "do anything else on any competing show."

In later years, he came to the conclusion that Ohlmeyer had not removed him from Update for his Simpson material; rather, he felt he had been removed because he was seen as insubordinate: "I think the whole show was tired of me not taking marching orders. Lorne would hint at things... I'd do Michael Jackson jokes. And Lorne would say, 'do you really want a lawsuit from Michael Jackson?' And I'd say, 'Cool! That'd be fuckin' cool, Michael Jackson suing me!'" Elsewhere, Macdonald would concede, "In all fairness to him, my Update was not an audience[-]pleasing, warm kind of thing. I did jokes that I knew weren't going to get bigger reactions. So I saw [Ohlmeyer's] point. Why would you want some dude who's not trying to please the audience?"

Macdonald returned to Saturday Night Live to host the October 23, 1999, show. In his opening monologue, he expressed resentment at being fired from Weekend Update, and then he concluded that the only reason he had been asked to host was that "the show has gotten really bad" since he left.

=== 1998–1999: Dirty Work and The Norm Show ===
Soon after leaving Saturday Night Live, Macdonald cowrote and starred in "revenge comedy" Dirty Work (1998), directed by Bob Saget, costarring Artie Lange, and featuring Chris Farley in his last film; the film was dedicated to Farley's memory. Later that year, Macdonald voiced Lucky in the Eddie Murphy adaptation of Dr. Dolittle. He reprised the role in both Dr. Dolittle 2 (2001) and Dr. Dolittle 3 (2006).

In 1999, Macdonald starred in The Norm Show (later retitled Norm), costarring Laurie Metcalf, Artie Lange, and Ian Gomez. It ran for three seasons on ABC. Earlier in 1999, he made an appearance in the Andy Kaufman biographical drama Man on the Moon, directed by Miloš Forman. When Michael Richards refused to portray himself in the scene reenacting the famous Fridays incident in which Kaufman threw water in his face, Macdonald stepped in to play Richards, although he was not referred to by name. Macdonald also appeared in Forman's previous film The People vs. Larry Flynt (1996) as a reporter summoned to Flynt's mansion regarding secret tapes involving automaker John DeLorean.

=== 2000–2005 ===
In 2000, Macdonald played the starring role for the second time in a motion picture alongside Dave Chappelle, Screwed, which fared poorly at the box office. He continued to make appearances on television shows and in films. Also, in 2000, Macdonald made his first appearance on Family Guy, as the voice of Death. That role was later recast to Adam Carolla. On November 12, 2000, he appeared on the Celebrity Edition of Who Wants to Be a Millionaire?, winning $500,000 for Paul Newman's Hole in the Wall Charity Camp, but could have won the million if he had ignored the advice of host Regis Philbin.

In 2003, Macdonald played the title character in the Fox sitcom A Minute with Stan Hooper, which was cancelled after six episodes. In 2005, Macdonald signed a deal with Comedy Central to create the sketch comedy Back to Norm, which debuted that May. The pilot, whose cold opening parodied the suicide of R. Budd Dwyer, featured as a cast member Rob Schneider and never turned into a series. Later in 2005, Macdonald voiced a genie named Norm on the Nickelodeon cartoon series The Fairly OddParents.

=== 2006–2009 ===
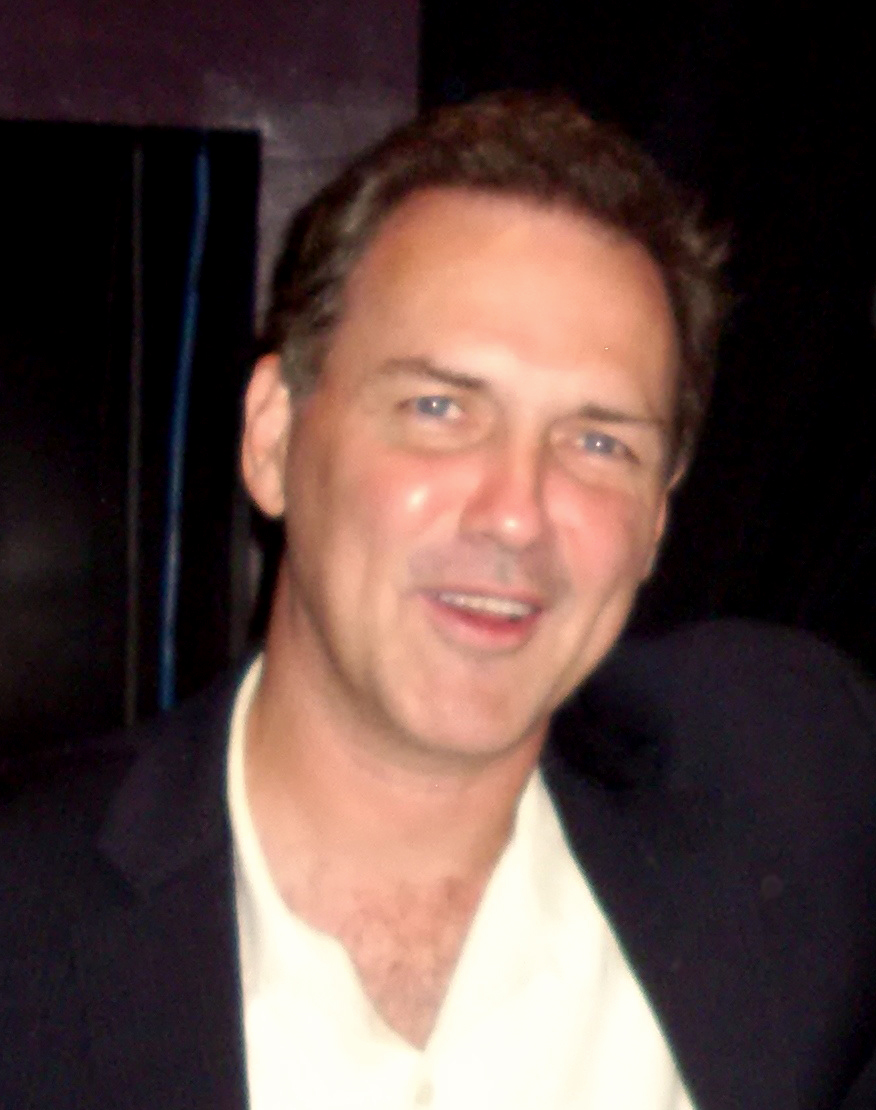
Macdonald in 2009

In 2006, Macdonald again performed as a voice actor, this time in a series of commercials for the Canadian mobile-services provider Bell Mobility, as the voice of Frank the Beaver. The campaign was extended through 2008 to promote offerings from other Bell Canada divisions such as the Internet provider Bell Sympatico and the satellite service Bell Satellite TV. In September 2006, Macdonald's sketch comedy album Ridiculous was released by Comedy Central Records. It features appearances by Will Ferrell, Jon Lovitz, Tim Meadows, Molly Shannon, and Artie Lange. On the comedy website Super Deluxe, he created an animated series entitled The Fake News. Macdonald filled in during Dennis Miller's weekly "Miller Time" segment on O'Reilly Factor, and guest-hosted Miller's radio show, on which he was briefly a weekly contributor.

Macdonald was a guest character on My Name Is Earl in the episode "Two Balls, Two Strikes" (2007) as Lil Chubby, the son of "Chubby" (played by Burt Reynolds), similar to Macdonald's portrayals of Reynolds on SNL. On June 19, 2008, Macdonald was a celebrity panellist on two episodes of a revived version of the game show Match Game. On August 17, 2008, Macdonald was a participant in the Comedy Central Roast of Bob Saget, performing intentionally cheesy and G-rated material that contrasted greatly with the raunchy performances of the other roasters. In AT&T commercials around Christmas 2007 and 2008, Macdonald voiced a gingerbread boy in a commercial for AT&T's GoPhone.

In 2009, Macdonald and Sam Simon pitched a fake reality show to FX called The Norm Macdonald Reality Show, where Macdonald would play a fictional, down-on-his-luck version of himself. The show was picked up and Garry Shandling was added to the cast, but it was cancelled halfway through filming. On the May 16, 2009, episode of Saturday Night Live, Macdonald reappeared as Burt Reynolds on Celebrity Jeopardy!, and in another sketch. On May 31, 2009, he appeared on Million Dollar Password.

=== 2010–2012 ===
Macdonald became a frequent guest on The Tonight Show with Conan O'Brien during its 2009 and 2010 run. He made frequent appearances on the Internet talk show Tom Green's House Tonight, and on May 20, 2010, was guest host.

In September 2010, Macdonald was developing a series for Comedy Central that he described as a sports version of The Daily Show. Sports Show with Norm Macdonald premiered April 12, 2011. Nine ordered episodes were broadcast. Macdonald's first stand-up special, Me Doing Stand-Up, aired on Comedy Central on March 26, 2011. On February 26, 2011, he became a commentator and co-host (with Kara Scott) of the seventh season of the TV series High Stakes Poker on Game Show Network.

Early in 2012, it was reported that Macdonald was developing a talk show for TBS titled Norm Macdonald is Trending, which would see Macdonald and a team of correspondents covering headlines from pop culture and social media. Clips for the unaired pilot published by The Washington Post resemble a sketch comedy show in the vein of Back to Norm.

In June 2012, he became the spokesman for Safe Auto Insurance Company. Along with television and radio commercials, web banners, and outdoor boards, the effort included a series of made-for-web videos. As part of the campaign, the state minimum auto insurance company introduced a new tagline, "Drive Safe, Spend Less."

=== 2013–2016: Norm Macdonald Live ===
In 2013, Macdonald premiered the podcast Norm Macdonald Live, with sidekick Adam Eget, streaming live weekly on Video Podcast Network and posted later on YouTube. It received positive notices from USA Today, Entertainment Weekly, and the "America's Comedy" website, while the Independent Film Channel stated that while Macdonald remained "a comedy force to be reckoned with" and "did not quite disappoint," the show was "a bit rough around the edges." The second season of Norm Macdonald Live began in May 2014, and the third began in September 2016.

Macdonald played the role of Rusty Heck, Mike Heck's hapless-yet-crafty brother on the sitcom The Middle, which ran from 2009 to 2018.

Macdonald also joined Grantland as a contributor in the first two months of 2013.

=== 2014–2022 ===
In 2014, Macdonald unsuccessfully campaigned on Twitter to be named the new host of The Late Late Show after then-host Craig Ferguson announced he would be leaving. On May 15, 2015, Macdonald was the final stand-up act on the Late Show with David Letterman. During his set, which ended with him breaking into tears as he told Letterman that he truly loved him, Macdonald included a joke Letterman had told the first time Macdonald had ever seen him during a 1970s appearance on the Canadian talk show 90 Minutes Live, where a 13-year-old Macdonald had been in the studio audience. Also in 2015, Macdonald was a judge for the ninth season of NBC's Last Comic Standing, joining the previous season's judges, Roseanne Barr and Keenan Ivory Wayans and replacing fellow Canadian Russell Peters from 2014.

In August 2015, he succeeded Darrell Hammond as Colonel Sanders in TV commercials for the KFC chain of fast food restaurants. Macdonald was replaced by Jim Gaffigan in the role by February 2016.

In September 2016, Macdonald's semi-fictional memoir Based on a True Story was published by Random House imprint Spiegel & Grau. It debuted at number 15 on the New York Times Best Sellers list for hardcover nonfiction, and made number 6 on the Best Sellers list for humour.

From May 2017, Macdonald moved his comedy to a more reserved, deadpan style. On stage, he claimed to have "no opinions" and the minimalist delivery was described as "reduc[ing] gesture and verbiage down to an absurd minimum."

In March 2018, Netflix announced it had ordered ten episodes of a new talk show titled Norm Macdonald Has a Show, hosted by Macdonald. The series premiered on September 14, 2018.

In September 2018, Macdonald sparked controversy after the publication of an interview in which he appeared to criticize aspects of the #MeToo movement and defend friends and fellow comedians Louis C.K. and Roseanne Barr. Macdonald's scheduled appearance on NBC's Tonight Show Starring Jimmy Fallon was subsequently cancelled.

In 2019, Macdonald appeared on Lights Out with David Spade and claimed to have changed his mind on O. J. Simpson's guilt, alleging that he could have rushed to judge the man. It was unclear if Macdonald's comments were meant to be taken as a joke, but Macdonald's close friend Lori Jo Hoekstra claimed Simpson himself reached out to Macdonald to thank him for the gentler commentary and offered to play golf.

In February 2020, Macdonald launched Loko, a dating app he co-created that relies heavily on video to make first impressions.

That summer, he had a stand-up set prepared for a final Netflix special, and he taped his audienceless dry run with the intention of filming it professionally to an audience. While the proper filming never materialized, the run-through was released posthumously as Norm Macdonald: Nothing Special on May 30, 2022, to critical acclaim. The special was followed with a discussion with Dave Chappelle, Molly Shannon, David Letterman, Conan O'Brien, David Spade, and Adam Sandler.

He had a recurring role as Yaphit, a gelatinous engineer, on the Fox science fiction series The Orville, whose third season, subtitled New Horizons, premiered in June 2022; Macdonald appeared posthumously in his last casting.

== Influences and views on comedy ==
Macdonald said his influences included the comedians Bob Newhart, Sam Kinison, Rodney Dangerfield, Dennis Miller, and the writers Leo Tolstoy and Anton Chekhov. In a 2006 interview to promote his new album Ridiculous on The Daily Show, Macdonald mentioned how he grew up listening to albums of fellow Canadians Cheech and Chong all the time, and wanted to make an adult comedy album once he became a professional comedian; Macdonald was also a big fan of Bill Cosby and George Carlin.

Speaking about Canada's homegrown comedy industry, Macdonald reflected that he would have liked there to have been more opportunity for him to stay in the country early in his career, stating:

"Now I know there's more of, like, an industry there. Like I was happy that Brent Butt got Corner Gas. Because he's a really funny guy. But there wasn't that opportunity when I was there. I remember Mike MacDonald had one short-lived series, but that was about it. Otherwise, there was nothing to do. But it was great with standup. It was way, way better with standup than in the States. Like, I think the standups are generally much better in Canada. Because, like, when I was in Canada, none of us had any ambition to do movies or TV because there were no movies or television. So it was all standup and we just assumed we'd be standups for our whole lives and that was what was fun. And then when I came to the States, I realized, whoa, they don't take their standup very seriously here because they're just trying to do something other than standup and using standup as, like, a springboard to something else that they're generally not as good at."

Reflecting on the state of modern comedy, he bemoaned the influx of dramatic actors into comedy and comedians into dramatic acting, commenting, "what young, handsome person is funny? I remember on Saturday Night Live hosts would come in. You know, like handsome hosts. They'd be dramatic actors generally. And the publicist would always be like, 'This is a big chance for this guy because he's really a funny guy and people don't know it. He's hilarious!' And then he'd just suck, you know? And then I realized a very important thing: You know how girls always say they like a guy with a sense of humour? I think what they do is they just laugh at whatever a handsome guy says. So the handsome guys are saying these idiotic jokes and the girls are giggling and laughing. They're going to think Mel Gibson is funnier than Shemp."

During an interview on CTV News with his sister-in-law, Joyce Napier, Macdonald talked about his belief that imitation was the highest form of flattery and his distaste for the "low-hanging fruit" of Donald Trump jokes.

== Personal life ==
In 1988, Macdonald married Connie Vaillancourt, with whom he had a son named Dylan, born in 1992. The couple separated in April 1999 and divorced later the same year.

=== Religious views ===
Macdonald was a Christian and discussed theology and his personal beliefs publicly. Macdonald's views on faith have been compared to those of Christian philosopher Søren Kierkegaard and Cardinal John Henry Newman.

While judging on Last Comic Standing, Macdonald criticized a contestant for a joke about the Harry Potter books and the Bible, saying, "I think if you're going to take on an entire religion, you should at least know what you're talking about." He pointed out that J. K. Rowling was a Christian who once said: "If you were familiar with the Scriptures, you could easily guess the ending of my book."

=== Gambling ===
Macdonald had a gambling addiction he claimed started with a six-figure win at a craps table in Atlantic City. In an appearance on the WTF with Marc Maron podcast in 2011, Macdonald revealed that he lost all of his money gambling three times, and the largest amount he lost at once was $400,000. He declared bankruptcy twice.

As a poker player, his best live result was cashing for $20,915 in the $1,000 Bellagio Weekly Tournament in July 2006. In the 2007 World Series of Poker, he came in 20th place out of 827 entrants in the $3,000 No-Limit Texas Hold 'em event, winning $14,608. He also frequently played live cash games as well as online poker. Macdonald said in a 2018 interview that, prior to the shutdown of online poker in the United States through the Unlawful Internet Gambling Enforcement Act of 2006, he would play up to 20 online limit hold 'em games at once. "Since they went offline, it kind of saved my life. Because I was just grinding out and couldn't even sleep."

== Illness, death, and legacy ==
In 2013, Macdonald was diagnosed with multiple myeloma. He disclosed his diagnosis only to his family, agent, and former wife, fearing that revealing his condition to the public would "affect the way he was perceived", according to his brother Neil. Macdonald received several stem cell transplants, using aliases to avoid attention. He was prescribed dexamethasone, which caused him to gain weight. After chemotherapy, Macdonald suffered from peripheral neuropathy, which led him to give up golf and tennis. The cancer went into remission not long after, but in early 2020, Macdonald was diagnosed with treatment-associated myelodysplastic syndrome, a cancer that later developed into acute myeloid leukemia.

Macdonald's final stem cell transplant occurred in March 2021. In July 2021, Macdonald received chemotherapy at the City of Hope National Medical Center in Duarte, California, where he developed an infection. While in the hospital, he recorded a voice-over role for the television series The Orville. He remained hospitalized at the City of Hope until his death, aged 61, from complications from acute leukemia on September 14, 2021. His remains were later cremated.

Jon Stewart called him the funniest person he knew in Macdonald's first interview at The Daily Show to promote The Norm Show. David Letterman called him "[The best] in every important way, in the world of stand-up... an opinion shared by me and all peers." According to Conan O'Brien, "Norm had the most unique comedic voice I have ever encountered and he was so relentlessly and uncompromisingly funny. I will never laugh that hard again." Canadian Prime Minister Justin Trudeau wrote on Twitter: "The world was a much funnier place because Norm Macdonald was in it. We've lost a comedic genius, and a great Canadian." Both John Oliver and Lorne Michaels dedicated their victories at the 73rd Primetime Emmy Awards to Macdonald's memory. Season 3 of The Orville opened with an onscreen dedication to Macdonald. Long time friend and collaborator Adam Eget named Macdonald as his "hero" when discussing his passing on the Chubby Behemoths YouTube podcast, and said he was "the most original voice in comedy since Sam Kinison" on an Instagram post dedicated to Macdonald.

On July 12, 2022, Macdonald was posthumously nominated for three Primetime Emmy Awards for his stand-up special Norm Macdonald: Nothing Special. Following O. J. Simpson's death on April 10, 2024, Macdonald's regular Saturday Night Live jokes about Simpson's trial were shared across the internet. Conan O'Brien remembered the late comic as giving the most notable commentary on the trial and murders, remembering him as having given "some of the most brilliant comedy of anybody" about the incident. He further remembered Macdonald as one of the greatest talk show guests and comedians of all time.

Dave Chappelle dedicated his Netflix special The Closer to the memory of Macdonald, who had died shortly before its release. Chappelle also opened his 2023 special The Dreamer by crediting Macdonald with making him fall in love with comedy again.

== Works ==
=== Comedy ===
Year	Title	Notes
2006	Ridiculous	Sketch album
2011	Me Doing Stand-Up	Stand-up special
2017	Hitler's Dog, Gossip & Trickery	Stand-up special
2022	Norm Macdonald: Nothing Special	Stand-up special; Posthumous release Nominated – Primetime Emmy Award for Outstanding Variety Special (Pre-Recorded); Nominated – Primetime Emmy Award for Outstanding Directing for a Variety Special; Nominated – Primetime Emmy Award for Outstanding Writing for a Variety Special

=== TV series ===
Year	Title	Notes
1999–2001	The Norm Show	3 seasons, 54 episodes, with Bruce Helford
2003	A Minute with Stan Hooper	1 season, 13 episodes, with Barry Kemp
2010–2018	The Middle	7 seasons, 10 episodes, as Rusty Heck

=== Literature ===
Year	Title	Notes
2016	Based on a True Story: Not a Memoir	Comic novel

=== Talk shows ===
Year	Title	Notes
2011	Sports Show with Norm Macdonald	9 episodes, with Mike Gibbons, Lori Jo Hoekstra, and Daniel Kellison
2013–2017	Norm Macdonald Live	3 seasons, 36 episodes
2018	Norm Macdonald Has a Show	10 episodes

== Filmography ==
=== Film ===
Year	Title	Role	Notes
1995	Billy Madison	Frank	
1996	The People vs. Larry Flynt	Network Reporter	
1998	Dirty Work	Mitch Weaver	Also co-writer
1998	Dr. Dolittle	Lucky	Voice
1999	Deuce Bigalow: Male Gigolo	Bartender	Uncredited cameo
1999	Man on the Moon	Michael Richards	Uncredited
2000	Screwed	Willard Fillmore	
2001	The Animal	Mob Member	Cameo
2001	Dr. Dolittle 2	Lucky	Voice
2005	Deuce Bigalow: European Gigolo	Earl McManus	Uncredited cameo
2006	Farce of the Penguins	Join Twosomes Penguin	Voice
2006	Dr. Dolittle 3	Lucky	Voice
2007	Senior Skip Day	Mr. Rigetti	
2007	Christmas Is Here Again	Buster the Fox	Voice
2008	Dr. Dolittle: Tail to the Chief	Lucky	Voice (uncredited)
2008	The Flight Before Christmas	Julius	Voice
2009	Funny People	Himself	Cameo
2009	Dr. Dolittle: Million Dollar Mutts	Lucky	Voice
2010	Grown Ups	Geezer	Cameo
2010	Hollywood & Wine	Sid Blaustein	
2011	Jack & Jill	Funbucket	Cameo
2012	The Adventures of Panda Warrior	King Leo	Voice
2012	Vampire Dog	Fang	Voice
2012	The Outback	Quint	Voice
2014	The Seventh Dwarf	Burner the Dragon	Voice
2015	The Ridiculous 6	Nugget Customer	Cameo
2017	Treasure Hounds	Skipper	Voice
2019	Klaus	Mogens	Voice
2021	Back Home Again	Grandpaws	Voice; Final film role, posthumous release

=== Television ===
Year	Title	Role	Notes
1990	Star Search	Himself	Stand-up comedy competitor
1991	One Night Stand	Himself	Stand-up special
1992	The Dennis Miller Show		Writer
1992–1993, 2018	Roseanne		Writer, story editor and consulting producer
1993	The Jackie Thomas Show	Jordan	Episode: "Strike"
1993–1999, 2009, 2015	Saturday Night Live	Various roles, Host	98 episodes; also writer
1995	The Larry Sanders Show	Himself	Episode: "Hank's Sex Tape"
1996, 2000	The Drew Carey Show	Simon Tate / Himself	2 episodes
1997	NewsRadio	Roger Edwards	Episode: "The Injury"
1999–2001	The Norm Show	Norm Henderson	54 episodes; also producer
2000, 2017	Family Guy	Death / Himself	Voice; Episode: "Death Is a Bitch" (uncredited); Episode: "Don't Be a Dickens at Christmas"
2003	A Minute with Stan Hooper	Stan Hooper	7 episodes; also executive producer
2004	Oliver Beene	Hobo Bob	Episode: "Girly Dad"
2005	The Fairly OddParents	Norm the Genie	Voice; 2 episodes
2005	Back to Norm	Various roles	Television special; also writer and producer
2007, 2009	My Name Is Earl	Little Chubby	2 episodes
2008	The Comedy Central Roast of Bob Saget	Himself	Television special
2010–2018	The Middle	Orville "Rusty" Heck	10 episodes
2011	High Stakes Poker	Himself (host)	Season 7
2014–2020	Mike Tyson Mysteries	Pigeon	Voice; 69 episodes
2015	Real Rob	Himself	Episode: "The Penis Episode Part 1"
2015	Last Comic Standing	Himself (judge)	8 episodes
2015	Sunnyside	Hole	12 episodes
2016	4th Canadian Screen Awards	Himself (host)	Television special
2016–2018	Skylanders Academy	Glumshanks	Voice; 38 episodes
2017	Comedians in Cars Getting Coffee	Himself	Episode: "A Rusty Car in the Rain"
2017	Girlboss	Rick	4 episodes
2017–2022 (Note: Macdonald recorded additional voiceover for the third season of the series, which was released posthumously.)	The Orville	Yaphit	Voice; 22 episodes

== Discography ==
Year	Title	Role	Notes
2006	Ridiculous	Comedy album	
2011	Me Doing Stand-Up	Comedy album	
2017	Hitler's Dog, Gossip & Trickery	Comedy album	
2022	Nothing Special	Comedy album	

== See also ==
- Moth joke

== Explanatory notes ==
Media offices
Preceded by Kevin Nealon	Weekend Update anchor 1994–1998	Succeeded by Colin Quinn
