= The Duncan Trussell Family Hour =

Religion and spirituality podcast

- Genre: Religion and spirituality podcast

Related
- Adaptations: The Midnight Gospel
- Website: www.duncantrussell.com

The Duncan Trussell Family Hour (DTFH) is a free podcast hosted by American comedian, writer and actor Duncan Trussell. As of September 9th, 2025, there have been over 700 episodes.

== History ==
The Duncan Trussell Family Hour evolved out of the Lavender Hour, a previous podcast hosted by Duncan and his then-girlfriend Natasha Leggero.

Clips from the show were used in the Netflix original animated series, The Midnight Gospel, a collaboration between Trussell and Pendleton Ward.

== See also ==
- Religion and spirituality podcast
