= 2003 California gubernatorial recall election =

Recall election in US state

- October 7, 2003
- Turnout: 61.20%
- Vote on recall
- Shall Gray Davis be recalled (removed) from the office of Governor?

Results
| Choice | Votes | % |
|---|---|---|
| Yes | 4,976,274 | 55.39% |
| No | 4,007,783 | 44.61% |
| Valid votes | 8,984,057 | 95.44% |
| Invalid or blank votes | 429,431 | 4.56% |
| Total votes | 9,413,488 | 100.00% |
| Registered voters/turnout | 15,380,536 | 61.2% |
- Yes: 50–60% 60–70% 70–80% No: 50–60% 60–70% 70–80% 80–90%
- Replacement candidates

If Davis is recalled, who should replace him as governor?
- Turnout: 61.20%
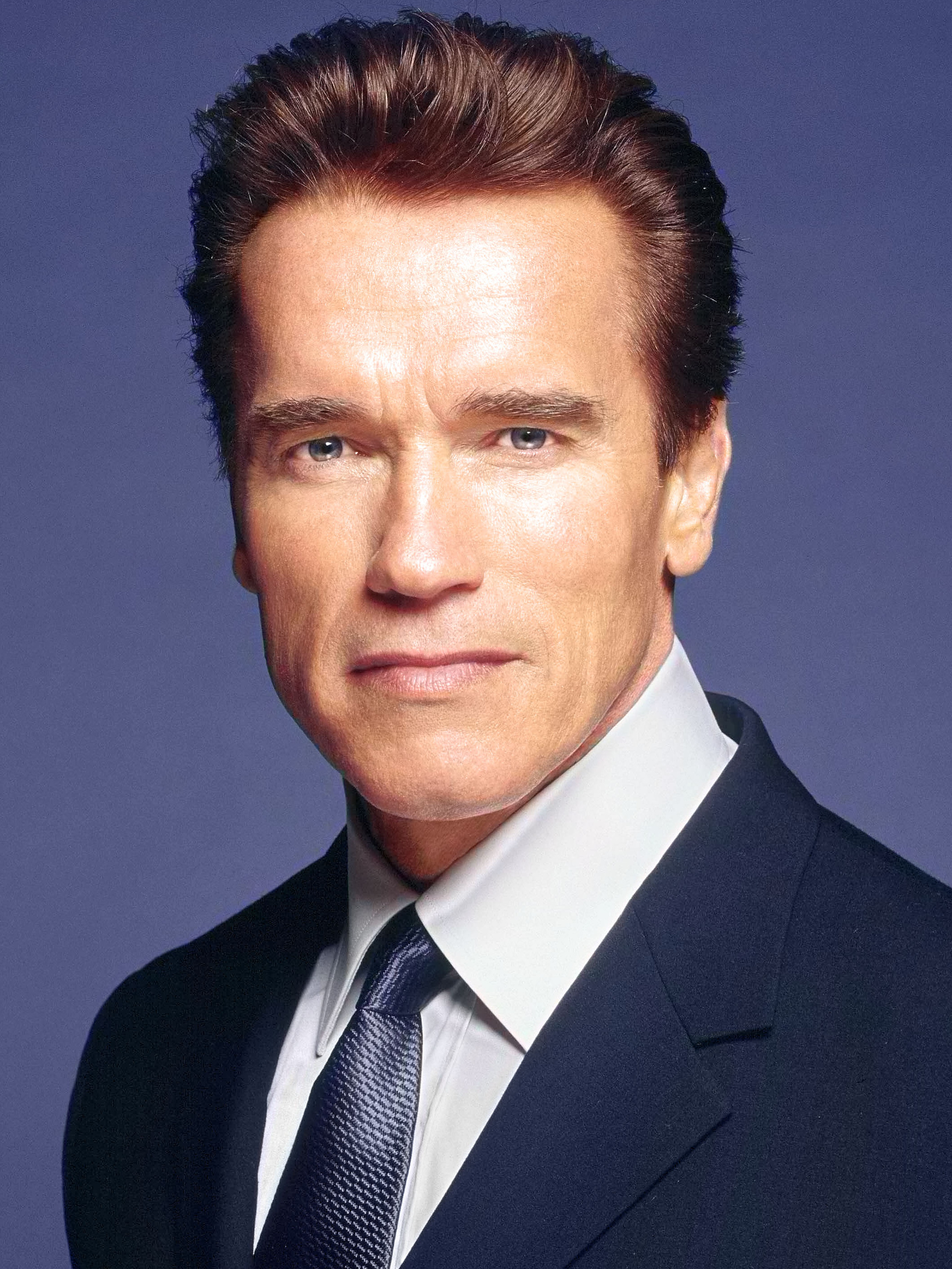

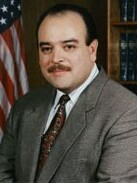

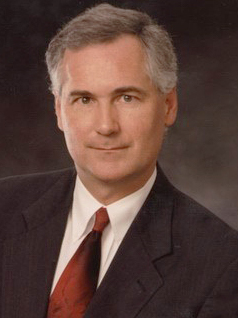
| Candidate | Arnold Schwarzenegger | Cruz Bustamante | Tom McClintock |
| Party | Republican | Democratic | Republican |
| Popular vote | 4,206,284 | 2,724,874 | 1,161,287 |
| Percentage | 48.58% | 31.47% | 13.41% |
- Schwarzenegger: 30–40% 40–50% 50–60% 60–70% Bustamante: 30–40% 40–50% 50–60% 60–70%
Governor before election
Gray Davis
Democratic
Governor after election
Arnold Schwarzenegger
Republican

The 2003 California gubernatorial recall election was a special election permitted under California state law. It resulted in voters replacing incumbent Democratic Governor Gray Davis with Arnold Schwarzenegger, a Republican. The recall effort spanned the latter half of 2003. Seven of the nine previous governors, including Davis, had faced unsuccessful recall attempts.

After several legal and procedural efforts failed to stop it, California's first-ever gubernatorial recall election was held on October 7, and the results were certified on November 14, 2003, making Davis the first governor recalled in the history of California, and just the second in U.S. history (the first was North Dakota's 1921 recall of Lynn Frazier). Imperial, Lake, and San Benito counties all voted for the recall after voting for Davis in 2002.

California is one of 19 states that allow recalls. California held a second recall election in 2021; however, that recall was unsuccessful, failing to oust Democratic Governor Gavin Newsom.

== Background ==
The California recall process became law in 1911 as the result of Progressive Era reforms that spread across the United States in the late 19th and early 20th centuries. The ability to recall elected officials came along with the initiative and referendum processes. The movement in California was spearheaded by Republican Governor Hiram Johnson, a reformist, who called the recall process a "precautionary measure by which a recalcitrant official can be removed". No illegality needs to be committed by politicians for them to be recalled. If an elected official commits a crime while in office, the state legislature can hold impeachment trials. For a recall, only the will of the people is necessary to remove an official. Nineteen U.S. states, along with the District of Columbia, allow the recall of state officials.

Before the successful recall of Gray Davis, no California statewide official had ever been recalled, although there had been 117 previous attempts. Only seven of those even made it onto the ballot, all for state legislators. Every California governor since Goodwin Knight in the 1950s has been subject to a recall effort. Davis was the first governor of California whose opponents gathered the necessary signatures to qualify for a special election. Davis also faced a recall petition in 1999, but that effort failed to gain enough signatures to qualify for the ballot. Davis's recall at the time was only the second gubernatorial recall election in U.S. history. The first governor recall occurred in 1921, when North Dakota's Lynn J. Frazier was recalled over a dispute about state-owned industries, and was replaced by Ragnvald A. Nestos. A third gubernatorial recall election occurred in Wisconsin in 2012 which, unlike the previous two, failed.

The 2003 recall was prompted by some actions taken by Davis and his predecessor, Governor Pete Wilson. Many people were upset with the governor's decision to block the enactment of Proposition 187, which had been found unconstitutional by a Federal District Court. Davis, who had opposed the measure, decided not to appeal the case to the U.S. Supreme Court, effectively killing the ballot measure. He also signed two new restrictive gun-control laws. Many people were further upset about the California electricity crisis. As Davis's recall transpired before he had served half of his term as governor, he remained eligible to serve another term, should he win a future election for the California governor post.

=== California law ===
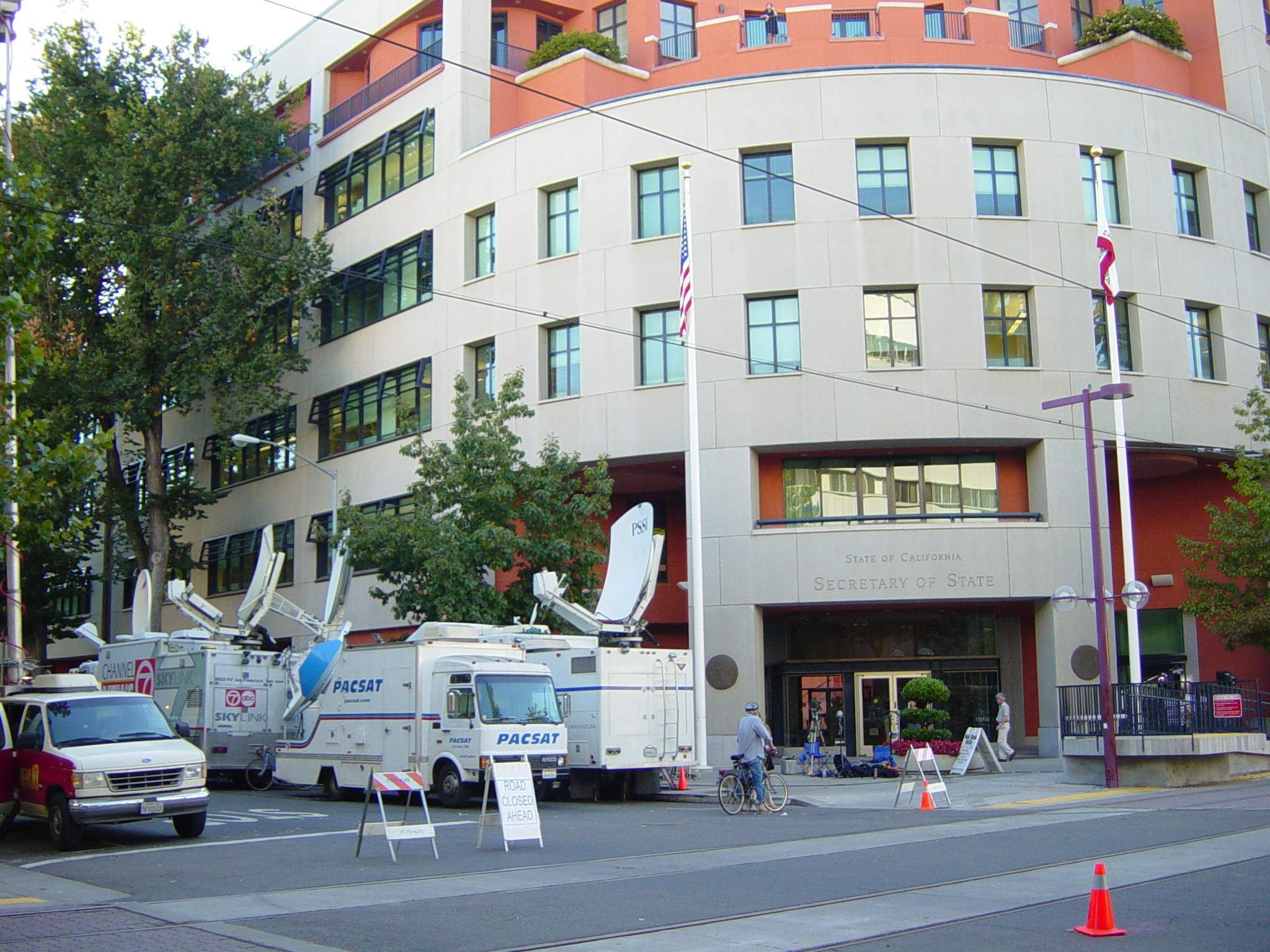
California Secretary of State building on October 7, 2003

Under California law, any elected official may be the target of a recall campaign. To trigger a recall election, proponents of the recall must gather a certain number of signatures from registered voters within a certain time period. The number of signatures statewide must equal 12% of the number of votes cast in the previous election for that office. For the 2003 recall election, that meant a minimum of 897,156 signatures, based on the November 2002 statewide elections. As the 2002 California gubernatorial election had the lowest turnout in modern history, the number of signatures required was less than usual.

The effort to recall Gray Davis began with Republicans Ted Costa, Mark Abernathy, and Howard Kaloogian, who filed their petition with the California Secretary of State and started gathering signatures. The effort was not taken seriously until U.S. Representative Darrell Issa, who hoped to run as a replacement candidate for governor, donated $2 million to a new committee, Rescue California, which then led the effort. Eventually, proponents gathered about 1.6 million signatures, of which 1,356,408 were certified as valid.

Under most circumstances in which a recall campaign against a statewide elected official has gathered the required number of signatures, the governor is required to schedule a special election for the recall vote. If the recall campaign qualified less than 180 days prior to the next regularly scheduled election, then the recall becomes part of that regularly scheduled election. In the case of a recall against the governor, the responsibility for scheduling a special election falls on the lieutenant governor, who in 2003 was Cruz Bustamante.

=== Political climate ===
The political climate was largely shaped by the California electricity crisis of the early 2000s, during which many people experienced a tripling of their energy costs as rolling blackouts occurred throughout the state. The public held Davis partly responsible, although the causes included federal deregulation and California's Electric Utility Industry Restructuring Act, signed into law by Governor Wilson.

Driving the outcome of the recall was the perception that Davis had mismanaged the events leading up to the energy crisis. It was argued that he had not fought vigorously for Californians against the energy fraud, and that he had not pushed for legislative or emergency executive action against the fraudulent companies soon enough. He was said to have signed deals agreeing to pay energy companies fixed yet inflated prices for years to come based on those paid during the crisis. Opponents felt that a corporate-friendly Republican governor could shield California politically from further corporate fraud. Others speculated that the corporations involved sought not only profit but also to act in concert with Republican political allies to cause political damage to the nationally influential Democratic governor. Still others, such as Arianna Huffington, argued that Davis's fundraising and campaign contributions from various companies, including energy companies, rendered him unable to confront his contributors. Davis had accepted $2 million from the California Correctional Peace Officers Association, and used his political connections to pass an estimated $5 billion raise for them over the coming years. That led many people throughout California to believe Davis was guilty of corruption, even if he did not meet the standard necessary for prosecution.

== Recall election ==
On February 5, 2003, anti-tax activist Ted Costa announced plans to launch a petition drive to recall Davis. Several committees were formed to collect signatures, but Costa's Davis Recall Committee was the only one authorized by the state to submit signatures. One committee, the "Recall Gray Davis Committee," organized by Republican political consultant Sal Russo and former Republican assemblyman Howard Kaloogian, played a smaller role in drumming up support. Kaloogian served as chairman, and Russo as chief strategist of the committee. After the recall, both Kaloogian and Russo went on to found Move America Forward.

By law, the committee had to collect signatures from registered California voters amounting to 12% of the number of Californians who voted in the previous gubernatorial election (November 2002) for the special recall vote to take place. The organization was given the go-ahead to collect signatures on March 25, 2003. Organizers had 160 days to collect signatures. They had to collect at least 897,158 valid signatures from registered voters by September 2, 2003.

The recall movement began slowly, largely relying on talk radio, a website, cooperative e-mail, word-of-mouth, and grassroots campaigning to drive the signature gathering. Davis derided the effort as "partisan mischief" by "a handful of right-wing politicians" and called the proponents losers; nevertheless, by mid-May, recall proponents said they had gathered 300,000 signatures. They sought to gather the necessary signatures by July to hold the special election in the fall of 2003, rather than in March 2004, during the Democratic presidential primary election, when Democratic Party turnout would presumably be higher. The effort continued to gather signatures, but the recall was far from a sure thing, and the proponents were short on cash to promote their cause.

The movement took off when wealthy U.S. Representative Darrell Issa, a Republican from San Diego, announced on May 6 that he would use his personal funds to advance the effort. He contributed $1.7 million to finance advertisements and professional signature-gatherers. With the movement accelerating, the recall effort began to make national news and soon seemed almost a sure thing. The only question was whether signatures would be collected quickly enough to force the special election to take place in late 2003 rather than in March 2004.

The Issa recall committee's e-mail stated that California Secretary of State Kevin Shelley, who belongs to the same party as the Governor, resisted certifying the recall signatures for as long as possible. By mid-May, the recall organization was calling for funds to initiate a lawsuit against Shelley and was publicly considering a separate recall effort against the Secretary of State (also an elected official in California). By July 23, 2003, recall advocates had turned in over 110% of the required signatures, and the Secretary of State announced that the signatures had been certified and that a recall election would take place. Proponents had set a goal of 1.2 million to provide a buffer in case of invalid signatures. In the end, there were 1,363,411 valid signatures out of 1,660,245 collected (897,156 required). On July 24, Lieutenant Governor Cruz Bustamante announced that Davis would face a recall election. This was to be the second gubernatorial recall election in United States history and the first in the history of California. California's Constitution required that a recall election be held within 80 days of the date the recall petition was certified, or within 180 days if a regularly scheduled statewide election came within that time. Had the petition been certified by the September 2 deadline, the election would have been held in March 2004, the next scheduled statewide election. Instead, Bustamante had to select a date. He chose Tuesday, October 7, 2003, which was 76 days after certification.

=== Arguments about the recall drive ===
Backers of the recall effort cited Davis's alleged lack of leadership, combined with California's weakened and hurt economy. According to the circulated petition:

[Governor Davis's actions were a] gross mismanagement of California Finances by overspending taxpayers' money, threatening public safety by cutting funds to local governments, failing to account for the exorbitant cost of the energy, and failing, in general, to deal with the state's major problems until they get to the crisis stage.

Opponents of the recall said the situation was more complicated for several reasons. The entire United States and many of its economic trading partners had been in an economic recession. California was hit harder than other states at the end of the speculative bubble known as the "dot-com bubble"—from 1996 to 2000—when Silicon Valley was the center of the internet economy. California state expenditures soared when the government was flush with revenues. Some Californians blamed Davis and the state legislature for continuing to spend heavily while revenues dried up, ultimately leading to record deficits.

The California electricity crisis of 2000–2001 caused great financial damage to the state of California. The legal issues were still not resolved in time to alleviate California's dire need for electricity, and the state instituted "rolling blackouts" and, in some cases, penalties for excess energy use. In the recall campaign, Republicans and others opposed to Davis's governance sometimes charged that Davis did not "respond properly" to the crisis. Most economists disagreed, believing that Davis could do little else—and anyone in the governor's office would have had to capitulate, as Davis did, in the absence of federal help. The George W. Bush administration rejected requests for federal intervention, responding that it was California's problem to solve. Still, subsequent revelations of corporate accounting scandals and market manipulation by some Texas-based energy companies, mainly Enron, did little to quiet the criticism of Davis's handling of the crisis.

Davis swept into the governor's office in 1998 in a landslide victory and a 60% approval rating as California's economy roared to new heights during the dot-com boom. Davis took his mandate from the voters and sought out a centrist political position, refusing some demands from labor unions and teachers' organizations on the left. The Democratic Davis, already opposed by Republicans, began losing favor among members of his own party. Nevertheless, Davis's approval ratings remained above 50%.

When the California electricity crisis slammed the state in 2001, Davis was blasted for his slow and ineffective response. His approval rating dropped into the 30s and never recovered. When the energy crisis subsided, Davis's administration was hit by a fundraising scandal. California had a $95 million contract with Oracle Corporation that the state auditor found unnecessary and overpriced. Three of Davis's aides were fired or resigned after it was revealed that the governor's technology adviser accepted a $25,000 campaign contribution shortly after the contract was signed. The money was returned, but the scandal fueled close scrutiny of Davis's fundraising for his 2002 re-election bid.

In the 2002 primary election, Davis ran unopposed for the Democratic nomination. He spent his campaign funds on attack ads against California Secretary of State Bill Jones and Los Angeles mayor Richard Riordan, the two well-known moderates in the Republican primary. The result was that his opponent in the general election was conservative Republican and political newcomer Bill Simon, who was popular within his own party but unknown to the majority of the state population. The attacks from both sides turned off voters and suppressed turnout; Davis ultimately won with 47% of the vote. The suppressed turnout lowered the threshold for the 2003 recall petition to qualify.

On December 18, 2002, just over a month after being reelected, Davis announced that California would face a record budget deficit possibly as high as $35 billion, a forecast $13.7 billion higher than one a month earlier. The number was finally estimated at $38.2 billion, more than the combined deficits of all 49 other states. Already suffering from low approval ratings, Davis's numbers hit historic lows in April 2003 with 24% approval and 65% disapproval, according to a California Field Poll. Davis was almost universally disliked by both Republicans and Democrats in the state, and a recall push was high. A hot-button issue that seemed to galvanize the public was the vehicle license fee increase Davis implemented under provisions of legislation passed by his predecessor, which originally reduced the fees.

On June 20, 2003, the Davis administration re-instituted the full vehicle license fee, and the action withstood legal challenge. The action was a key step in the plan to close the $38 billion shortfall in the 2003–2004 budget. The increase tripled the vehicle license fee for the average car owner, and began appearing in renewal notices starting August 1. The California state budget passed in late July 2003 included the projected $4 billion in increased vehicle license fee revenue. Proponents of the Governor's recall characterized the increase as a tax hike and used it as an issue in the recall campaign. In mid-August 2003, Davis floated a plan to reverse the increase by raising taxes on high-income earners, cigarettes, and alcoholic beverages.

When Davis was recalled and Arnold Schwarzenegger was elected governor in October 2003, Schwarzenegger vowed that his first act as governor would be to revoke the vehicle license fee increase. On November 17, just after his inauguration, Governor Schwarzenegger signed Executive Order S-1-03, rescinding the vehicle license fee retroactive to October 1, 2003, when the fee increase went into effect. Analysts predicted that this would add more than $4 billion to the state deficit. Schwarzenegger did not indicate how cities and counties would be reimbursed for the lost revenue from the license fee that they use to support public safety and other local government activities.

=== Top candidates ===
In total, 135 candidates qualified for the ballot for the October 7 recall election. Several of the candidates were prominent celebrities. In the election, only four candidates received at least 1% of the vote:

- Cruz Bustamante, lieutenant governor, Democrat
- Peter Camejo, 2002 Green Party candidate for governor
- Tom McClintock, State Senator, Republican
- Arnold Schwarzenegger, Hollywood actor, Republican

=== Election process ===
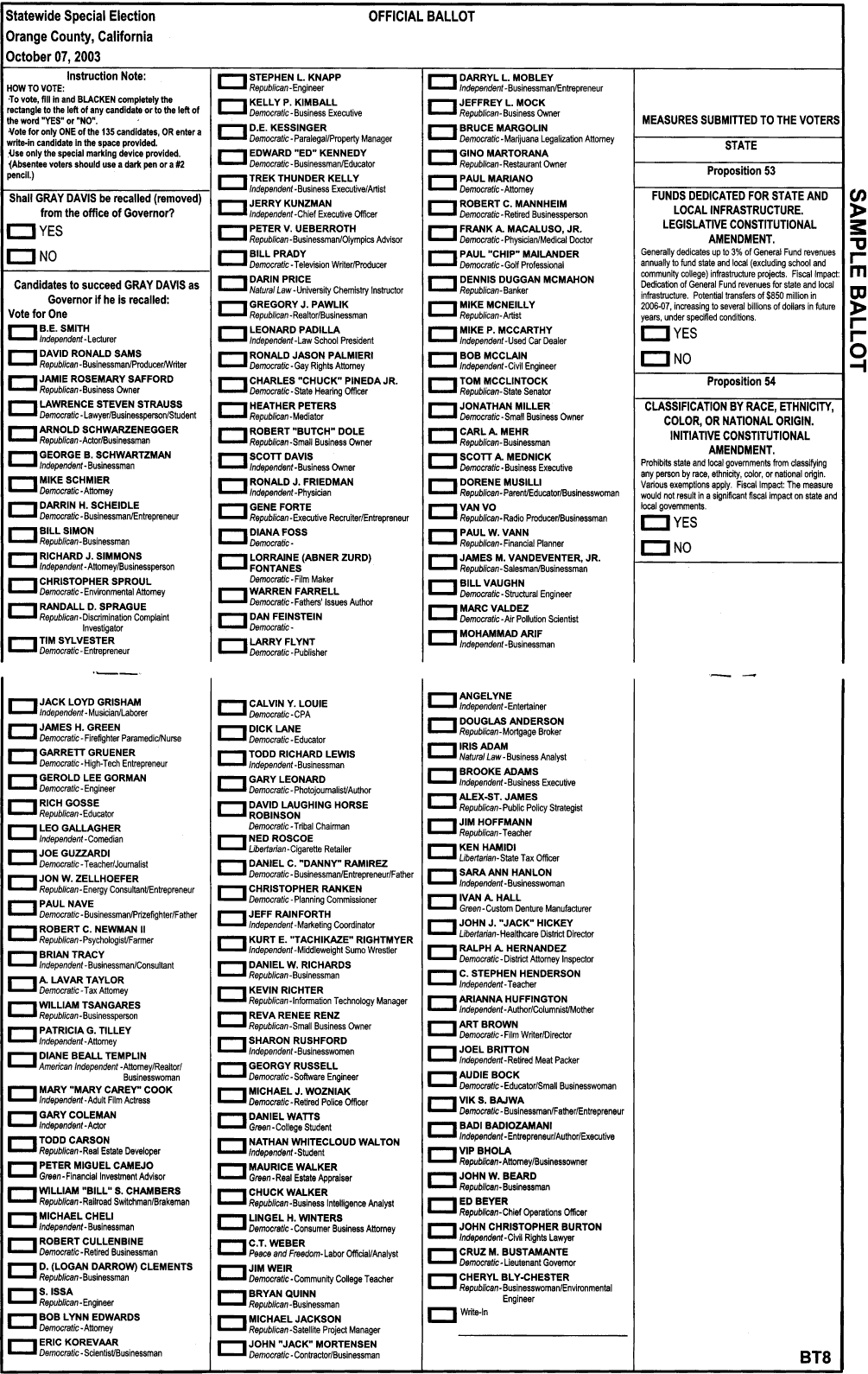
Sample ballot from Orange County; the recall question, along with the list of replacement candidates, fills the first three columns. The order of the names on the ballot was determined by randomizing the sequence of the alphabet, with the list shifted in each of the state's 80 Assembly districts. As a result, with 135 candidates in the race, some candidates were not able to be listed first in at least one district.

The ballot consisted of two questions; voters could vote on one, the other, or both. The first question asked whether Gray Davis should be recalled. It was a simple yes–no question, and if a majority voted no, then the second question would become irrelevant, and Davis would remain California governor. If a majority voted yes, then Davis would be removed from office once the vote was certified, and the second question would determine his successor.

Voters had to choose one candidate from a long list of 135 candidates. Voters who opposed recalling Davis could still vote for a candidate to replace him if the recall succeeded. The candidate receiving the most votes (a plurality) would then become the next governor of California. Certification by the Secretary of State of California would require completion within 39 days of the election, and history indicated that it could require that entire time frame to certify the statewide election results. Once the results were certified, a newly elected governor would have to be sworn into office within 10 days.

=== Filing requirements and candidates ===
Candidates seeking to replace Governor Gray Davis in the 2003 recall election had until August 9 to file their nomination papers. The requirements for ballot access were relatively modest. Candidates were required to obtain 65 valid nomination signatures from registered voters affiliated with their party and pay a nonrefundable filing fee of $3,500. Alternatively, candidates could submit up to 10,000 valid signatures in lieu of the fee, with the fee reduced proportionally to the number of valid signatures collected. Candidates affiliated with five qualified minor parties, the American Independent, Green, Libertarian, Natural Law, and Peace and Freedom parties, were subject to a separate provision: they could submit signatures from at least 10 percent of their party's registered voters, up to a maximum of 150, to offset the filing fee. These signatures did not automatically exempt candidates from the fee.

The low requirements attracted many "average Joes" with no political experience to file, as well as several celebrity candidates. Many prominent potential candidates chose not to run. These included Democratic U.S. Senator Dianne Feinstein, widely regarded as the most popular statewide office-holding Democrat in California, who cited her own experience with a recall drive while she was mayor of San Francisco.

Darrell Issa, who bankrolled the recall effort and had said he would run for governor, abruptly dropped out of the race on August 7 amidst accusations that he had bankrolled the recall effort solely to get himself into office. Issa claimed that Schwarzenegger's decision to run did not affect his own, and he dropped out because he was assured there were several strong candidates in the recall. The San Francisco Chronicle claimed that Davis's attacks on Issa's "checkered past" and polls showing strong Republican support for Schwarzenegger caused Issa to withdraw.

Former Mayor of Los Angeles Richard Riordan and actor Arnold Schwarzenegger (a fellow Republican) agreed that only one of them would run; when Schwarzenegger announced on The Tonight Show with Jay Leno that he would be a candidate, Riordan dropped out of the race. Riordan was surprised, and those close to him say he was angered when he learned Schwarzenegger was running. Riordan did end up endorsing Schwarzenegger, but his endorsement was described as terse and matter-of-fact, in contrast to his usual effusiveness.

Lieutenant Governor Cruz Bustamante himself entered the race and quickly became the Democratic frontrunner, although he continued to oppose the recall and urged Californians to vote against it. State Insurance Commissioner John Garamendi (a Democrat) announced on August 7 that he would be a candidate for governor. Just two days later and only hours before the deadline to file, he announced "I will not engage in this election as a candidate", adding, "this recall election has become a circus". Garamendi had been under tremendous pressure to drop out from fellow Democrats who feared a split of the Democratic vote between him and Bustamante, should the recall succeed.

=== Campaign ===
On September 3, five top candidates—independent Arianna Huffington, Democratic Lieutenant Governor Cruz Bustamante, Green Party candidate Peter Camejo, Republican State Senator Tom McClintock, and former baseball commissioner Peter Ueberroth—participated in a live television debate. Noticeably absent was Arnold Schwarzenegger, who opponents charged was not adequately prepared. Schwarzenegger had repeatedly stated that he would not participate in such events until later in the election cycle. Prior to this first debate, Governor Davis spent 30 minutes answering questions from a panel of journalists and voters.

Due to the media attention focused on some candidates, GSN held a game show debate entitled Who Wants to Be Governor of California? – The Debating Game, a political game show featuring six candidates unlikely to win the election, including former child star Gary Coleman and porn star Mary Carey. Several candidates who would still be listed on the ballot dropped out of the campaign before the October 7 election. On August 23, Republican Bill Simon (the 2002 party nominee) announced he was dropping out. He said: "There are too many Republicans in this race and the people of our state simply cannot risk a continuation of the Gray Davis legacy." Simon did not endorse any candidates at the time, but several weeks later he endorsed front-runner Arnold Schwarzenegger, as did Darrell Issa, who had not filed for the race. On September 9, former MLB commissioner and Los Angeles Olympic Committee President Peter Ueberroth withdrew his candidacy in the recall election.

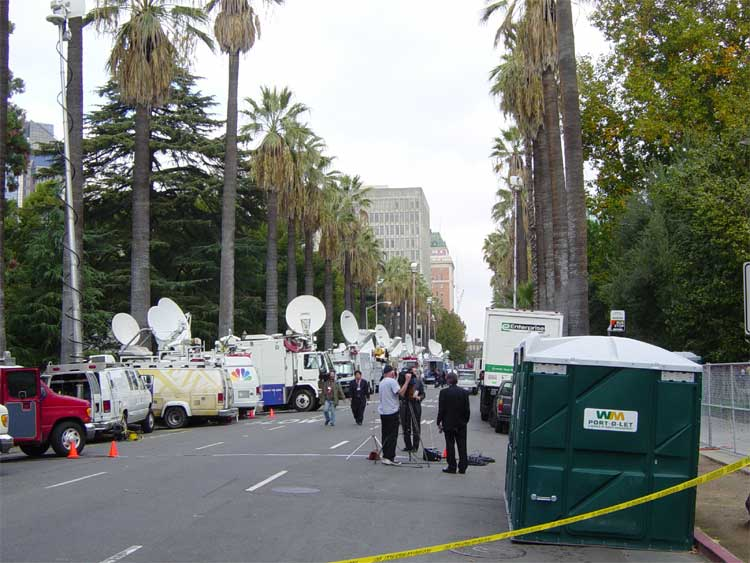
Newsvans at Schwarzenegger inauguration

On September 24, the remaining top five candidates (Schwarzenegger, Bustamante, Huffington, McClintock, and Camejo) gathered in the University Ballroom at California State University, Sacramento, for a live televised debate that resembled the red-carpet premiere of a movie in Hollywood. Schwarzenegger's marquee name attracted large crowds, a carnival atmosphere, and an army of hundreds of credentialed media from around the world. While the candidate and his staff rode on buses named Running Man and Total Recall, the reporters' buses were named after Predator. The aftermath of the debate was swift. On September 30, author Arianna Huffington withdrew her candidacy on the Larry King Live television program and announced that she was opposing the recall entirely in light of Schwarzenegger's surge in the polls. Apparently in response to her withdrawal, Bustamante endorsed her plan for public financing of election campaigns, an intended anti-corruption measure.

Some replacement ballot candidates urged voters to vote "no" on the recall question. An endorsement of voting "no" on the recall was included in several candidates' official statements, including those of Bustamante, Eric Korevaar, Christopher Ranken, C.T. Weber and Tim Sylvester.

=== Election issues ===
==== Concurrent alternatives ====
On July 29, 2003, federal judge Barry Moskowitz ruled section 11382 of the California election code unconstitutional. The provision required that only voters who had voted in favor of the recall could vote for a candidate for governor. The judge ruled that a voter could vote for or against the recall election and still vote for a replacement candidate. Secretary of State Kevin Shelley did not contest the ruling, thereby setting a legal precedent.

==== Availability of Spanish-speaking poll workers ====
In August, a federal judge in San Jose announced he was considering issuing an order to postpone the recall election. Activists in Monterey County had filed suit, claiming that Monterey County, and other counties of California affected by the Voting Rights Act were violating the act by announcing that, because of budgetary constraints, they were planning on hiring fewer Spanish-speaking poll watchers, and were going to cut back by almost half the number of polling places. On September 5, a three-member panel of federal judges ruled that the county's election plans did not violate the federal Voting Rights Act.

==== Punch card ballots ====
A lawsuit filed in Los Angeles by the American Civil Liberties Union (ACLU) claimed that the use of the "hanging chad" style punch-card ballots still in use in six California counties (Los Angeles, Mendocino, Sacramento, San Diego, Santa Clara, and Solano) was in violation of fair election laws. U.S. District Judge Stephen V. Wilson in Los Angeles ruled on August 20, 2003, that the election would not be delayed because of the punch-card ballot problems. There was an estimate that up to 40,000 voters in those heavily minority districts might be disenfranchised if the election were not postponed to remedy the difficulty. His ruling was appealed and heard by three judges in the 9th U.S. Circuit Court of Appeals. On September 15, the judges issued a unanimous ruling postponing the recall election until March 2004, on the grounds that the existence of allegedly obsolete voting equipment in those six counties violated the equal protection constitutional guarantee, thus overruling the lower district court, which had rejected this argument.

Recall proponents questioned why punch-card ballots were adequate enough to elect Governor Davis, but were not good enough to recall him. Proponents planned to appeal the postponement to the U.S. Supreme Court; however, an 11-judge en banc panel, also from the Ninth U.S. Circuit Court of Appeals and quickly and carefully canvassed by Judge Alex Kozinski, gathered to rehear the controversial case. On the morning of September 23, the panel reversed the three-judge ruling in a unanimous decision, arguing that the concerns about the punch-card ballots were outweighed by the harm that would be done by postponing the election.

Further legal appeals were discussed but did not occur. The ACLU announced it would not make an appeal to the U.S. Supreme Court, and Davis was widely quoted in the press as saying "Let's just get it over with", and the election proceeded as planned on October 7.

=== Polling ===
Public opinion was divided on the recall, with many passionately held positions on both sides of the recall election. Californians were fairly united in their disapproval of Governor Davis's handling of the state, with his approval numbers in the mid-20s. On the question of whether he should be recalled, Californians were more divided, but polls in the weeks leading up to the election consistently showed that a majority would vote to remove him.

Polls showed that the two leading candidates, Lieutenant Governor Cruz Bustamante, a Democrat, and Hollywood actor Arnold Schwarzenegger, a Republican, were neck and neck with about 25–35% of the vote each, and Bustamante with a slight lead in most polls. Republican State Senator Tom McClintock also polled in the double digits. Remaining candidates polled in the low single digits. Polls in the final week leading up to the election showed support for Davis slipping and support for Schwarzenegger growing.

Many observers outside California and some members of the press consistently called the recall chaos and madness as well as a media circus and nightmare. With the candidacies of a few celebrities and many regular Californians, the entire affair became a joke to some (there were tongue-in-cheek references to Schwarzenegger's role in the science fiction film Total Recall) as well as an "only-in-California" event. Nevertheless, most Californians took the recall seriously, with the future of the governor's office at stake. In the months before the election, 380,000 Californians registered to vote, for a total of 15.3 million—more registered voters than there had been in the three previous presidential elections.

=== Predictions ===
| Source | Ranking | As of |
|---|---|---|
| Sabato | Tossup | September 2, 2003 |

== Results ==
The October 7 ballot had two questions. The first question was whether Gray Davis, the sitting governor, should be recalled; those voting on it were 55.4% in favor of recall and 44.6% opposed. The second question was who would replace the governor if a majority voted to recall him. Among those voting on the potential replacement, Arnold Schwarzenegger received a plurality of 48.6%, surpassing Lieutenant Governor Cruz Bustamante's 31.5%, a margin of about 3-to-2. Republican Tom McClintock received 13.4% of the vote – less than half the share of the candidate he trailed. Green Party candidate Peter Camejo polled 2.8%, trailing McClintock by almost four-to-one. Each remaining candidate polled 0.6% or less.

Schwarzenegger's votes exceeded those for the next five candidates combined, despite the presumed division of Republican voters between him and McClintock. There were also more votes for Schwarzenegger (4,206,284) than against recalling Davis (4,007,783), avoiding the theoretical scenario in which the replacement had less support than the recalled governor. At 10 p.m. local time, Davis conceded that he had lost to Schwarzenegger. He said, "We've had a lot of good nights over the last 20 years, but tonight the people did decide that it's time for someone else to serve, and I accept their judgment." About 40 minutes later, in his acceptance speech, Schwarzenegger said: "Today California has given me the greatest gift of all: You've given me your trust by voting for me. I will do everything I can to live up to that trust. I will not fail you."

Following the election, all 58 of California's counties had 28 days (until November 4, 2003) each to conduct a countywide canvass of their votes. Counties used this time to count any absentee ballots or provisional ballots not yet counted, to reconcile the number of signatures on the roster of registered voters with the number of ballots recorded on the ballot statement, to count any valid write-in votes, to reproduce any damaged ballots, if necessary, and to conduct a hand count of the ballots cast in 1% of the precincts, chosen at random by the elections official. Counties then had seven days from the conclusion of canvassing (November 11, 2003, 35 days after the election) to submit their final vote totals to the California Secretary of State's office. The Secretary of State had to certify the final statewide vote within 39 days of the election (by November 15). The vote was officially certified on November 14, 2003. Once the vote was certified, governor-elect Schwarzenegger had to be sworn into office within ten days. His inauguration took place on November 17, 2003.

| Key: | Withdrew prior to contest |

California gubernatorial recall election, 2003
| Vote on recall | | | Votes | Percentage |
| Yes | | | 4,976,274 | 55.39% |
| No | | | 4,007,783 | 44.61% |
| Invalid or blank votes | | | 429,431 | 4.6% |
| Totals | | | 9,413,488 | 100.0% |
| Voter turnout | | | 61.2% | |
| Rank | Party | Candidate | Votes | Percentage |
| 1 | Republican | Arnold Schwarzenegger | 4,206,284 | 48.58% |
| 2 | Democratic | Cruz Bustamante | 2,724,874 | 31.47% |
| 3 | Republican | Tom McClintock | 1,161,287 | 13.41% |
| 4 | Green | Peter Camejo | 242,247 | 2.80% |
| 5 | Independent | Arianna Huffington | 47,505 | 0.55% |
| | All other listed and write-in candidates (see below for details) | | 275,719 | 3.18% |
Complete list of all other candidates: Rank / Party / Candidate / Votes / Percentage; 6 / Republican / Peter Ueberroth / 25,134 / 0.29%; 7 / Democratic / Larry Flynt / 17,458 / 0.20%; 8 / Independent / Gary Coleman / 14,242 / 0.16%; 9 / Independent / George B. Schwartzman / 12,382 / 0.14%; 10 / Independent / Mary Carey / 11,179 / 0.13%; 11 / Democratic / Bruce Margolin / 9,188 / 0.11%; 12 / Republican / Bill Simon / 8,913 / 0.10%; 13 / Republican / Van Vo / 7,226 / 0.08%; 14 / Independent / John Christopher Burton / 6,748 / 0.08%; 15 / Democratic / David Laughing Horse Robinson / 6,496 / 0.08%; 16 / Independent / Leo Gallagher / 5,466 / 0.06%; 17 / Republican / Cheryl Bly-Chester / 5,297 / 0.06%; 18 / Democratic / Lawrence Strauss / 5,245 / 0.06%; 19 / Democratic / Ronald Palmieri / 4,221 / 0.05%; 20 / Democratic / Calvin Louie / 3,906 / 0.05%; 21 / Independent / Badi Badiozamani / 3,404 / 0.04%; 22 / Democratic / Audie Bock / 3,358 / 0.04%; 23 / Democratic / Ralph Hernandez / 3,199 / 0.04%; 24 / Democratic / Edward Kennedy / 3,007 / 0.03%; 25 / Democratic / Dan Feinstein / 2,927 / 0.03%; 26 / Independent / Bob McClain / 2,857 / 0.03%; 27 / Democratic / James Green / 2,848 / 0.03%; 28 / Democratic / Garrett Gruener / 2,562 / 0.03%; 29 / Independent / Angelyne / 2,536 / 0.03%; 30 / Democratic / Paul Mariano / 2,455 / 0.03%; 31 / Green / Ivan Hall / 2,346 / 0.03%; 32 / Democratic / Jim Weir / 2,328 / 0.03%; 33 / Independent / Jerome Kunzman / 2,317 / 0.03%; 34 / Libertarian / Ned Roscoe / 2,250 / 0.03%; 35 / Democratic / Georgina Russell / 2,216 / 0.03%; 36 / Democratic / Jonathan Miller / 2,214 / 0.03%; 37 / Independent / Jack Grisham / 2,200 / 0.03%; 38 / Democratic / Christopher Sproul / 2,039 / 0.02%; 39 / Green / Daniel Watts / 2,021 / 0.02%; 40 / Libertarian / Ken Hamidi / 1,948 / 0.02%; 41 / Democratic / Marc Valdez / 1,840 / 0.02%; 42 / Democratic / Frank Macaluso / 1,801 / 0.02%; 43 / Democratic / Daniel Ramirez / 1,778 / 0.02%; 44 / Republican / Randall Sprague / 1,771 / 0.02%; 45 / Independent / Brooke Adams / 1,713 / 0.02%; 46 / Independent / Mohammad Arif / 1,709 / 0.02%; 47 / Independent / Nathan Walton / 1,697 / 0.02%; 48 / Libertarian / John Hickey / 1,689 / 0.02%; 49 / Democratic / Mike Schmier / 1,652 / 0.02%; 50 / Peace and Freedom / C.T. Weber / 1,626 / 0.02%; 51 / Democratic / Diana Foss / 1,577 / 0.02%; 52 / Democratic / Michael Wozniak / 1,562 / 0.02%; 53 / Independent / B.E. Smith / 1,545 / 0.02%; 54 / Democratic / Lingel Winters / 1,466 / 0.02%; 55 / Independent / Richard Simmons / 1,422 / 0.02%; 56 / Democratic / Joe Guzzardi / 1,419 / 0.02%; 57 / Independent / Mike McCarthy / 1,351 / 0.02%; 58 / Democratic / Art Brown / 1,344 / 0.02%; 59 / Independent / Leonard Padilla / 1,343 / 0.02%; 60 / Natural Law / Iris Adam / 1,297 / 0.01%; 61 / Green / Maurice Walker / 1,236 / 0.01%; 62 / Independent / Trek Kelly / 1,210 / 0.01%; 63 / Democratic / Vikramjit Bajwa / 1,168 / 0.01%; 64 / Republican / David Sams / 1,166 / 0.01%; 65 / Natural Law / Darin Price / 1,152 / 0.01%; 66 / American Independent / Charles Pineda / 1,104 / 0.01%; 67 / Democratic / John Mortensen / 1,078 / 0.01%; 68 / Independent / Sara Hanlon / 1,077 / 0.01%; 69 / American Independent / Diane Templin / 1,067 / 0.01%; 70 / Democratic / Dick Lane / 1,065 / 0.01%; 71 / Republican / Jim Hoffmann / 1,046 / 0.01%; 72 / Democratic / William Vaughn / 1,028 / 0.01%; 73 / Independent / C. Stephen Henderson / 989 / 0.01%; 74 / Republican / Robert Newman / 987 / 0.01%; 75 / Republican / Jamie Safford / 943 / 0.01%; 76 / Democratic / Robert Mannheim / 914 / 0.01%; 77 / Republican / Dorene Musilli / 907 / 0.01%; 78 / Democratic / Scott Mednick / 903 / 0.01%; 79 / Democratic / A. Lavar Taylor / 851 / 0.01%; 80 / Independent / Brian Tracy / 842 / 0.01%; 81 / Independent / Kurt Rightmyer / 837 / 0.01%; 82 / Democratic / Christopher Ranken / 823 / 0.01%; 83 / Independent / Sharon Rushford / 821 / 0.01%; 84 / Democratic / Darrin Scheidle / 814 / 0.01%; 85 / Independent / Patricia Tilley / 792 / 0.01%; 86 / Independent / Darryl Mobley / 778 / 0.01%; 87 / Republican / Alex-St. James / 771 / 0.01%; 88 / Democratic / Bob Edwards / 758 / 0.01%; 89 / Republican / Douglas Anderson / 754 / 0.01%; 90 / Independent / Joel Britton / 751 / 0.01%; 91 / Republican / Michael Jackson / 746 / 0.01%; 92 / Republican / Ed Beyer / 727 / 0.01%; 93 / Democratic / Paul Mailander / 715 / 0.01%; 94 / Republican / John Beard / 699 / 0.01%; 95 / Democratic / Paul Nave / 679 / 0.01%; 96 / Democratic / Robert Cullenbine / 632 / 0.01%; 97 / Democratic / Warren Farrell / 626 / 0.01%; 98 / Republican / Chuck Walker / 623 / 0.01%; 99 / Republican / William Chambers / 610 / 0.01%; 100 / Republican / Vip Bhola / 607 / 0.01%; 101 / Democratic / Gerold Lee Gorman / 598 / 0.01%; 102 / Republican / Dennis McMahon / 591 / 0.01%; 103 / Republican / James Vandeventer / 588 / 0.01%; 104 / Democratic / Eric Korevaar / 586 / 0.01%; 105 / Democratic / Kelly Kimball / 582 / 0.01%; 106 / Republican / Mike McNeilly / 581 / 0.01%; 107 / Republican / S. Issa / 554 / 0.01%; 108 / Republican / Gino Martorana / 532 / 0.01%; 109 / Republican / Richard Gosse / 497 / 0.01%; 110 / Democratic / Tim Sylvester / 489 / 0.01%; 111(t) / Democratic / Bill Prady / 474 / 0.01%; 111(t) / Republican / Bryan Quinn / 474 / 0.01%; 113 / Republican / Jeffrey Mock / 455 / 0.01%; 114 / Republican / Paul Vann / 452 / 0.01%; 115 / Independent / Michael Cheli / 451 / 0.01%; 116 / Republican / Heather Peters / 444 / 0.01%; 117 / Independent (Note: Filed as an independent, but was a registered member, past congressional nominee of, and the incumbent state chapter chairman of the Reform Party and touted that party's endorsement in his official candidate statement) / Jeff Rainforth / 425 / <0.01%; 118 / Independent / Ronald Friedman / 419 / <0.01%; 119 / Republican / Todd Carson / 386 / <0.01%; 120 / Independent / Scott Davis / 384 / <0.01%; 121 / Republican / Daniel Richards / 383 / <0.01%; 122 / Republican / Carl Mehr / 376 / <0.01%; 123 / Democratic / Lorraine Fontanes / 365 / <0.01%; 124 / Democratic / Gary Leonard / 359 / <0.01%; 125 / Republican / Gregory Pawlik / 349 / <0.01%; 126 / Republican / Jon Zellhoefer / 346 / <0.01%; 127 / Republican / Reva Renz / 333 / <0.01%; 128 / Republican / Kevin Richter / 305 / <0.01%; 129 / Republican / Stephen Knapp / 298 / <0.01%; 130 / Republican / William Tsangares / 281 / <0.01%; 131 / Republican / Logan Clements / 274 / <0.01%; 132 / Republican / Robert Dole / 273 / <0.01%; 133 / Democratic / David Kessinger / 261 / <0.01%; 134 / Republican / Gene Forte / 235 / <0.01%; 135 / Independent / Todd Lewis / 192 / <0.01%; 136 / Independent / Mathilda Spak (write-in) / 16 / <0.01%; 137(t) / Republican / Jason Gastrich (write-in) / 11 / <0.01%; 137(t) / Democratic / Monty Manibog (write-in) / 11 / <0.01%; 139(t) / Independent / Thomas Benigno (write-in) / 7 / <0.01%; 139(t) / Independent / R. Charlie Chadwick (write-in) / 7 / <0.01%; 141(t) / Independent / Shirley Coly (write-in) / 5 / <0.01%; 141(t) / Democratic / Jane Dawson (write-in) / 5 / <0.01%; 143(t) / Democratic / Pauline Cooper (write-in) / 4 / <0.01%; 143(t) / Independent / Paul Walton (write-in) / 4 / <0.01%; 145(t) / Republican / Jim Trenton (write-in) / 3 / <0.01%; 145(t) / Democratic / Wignes Warren (write-in) / 3 / <0.01%; 147(t) / Independent / Christy Cassel (write-in) / 2 / <0.01%; 147(t) / Republican / Jacques-André Istel (write-in) / 2 / <0.01%; 147(t) / Democratic / Christian Meister (write-in) / 2 / <0.01%; 147(t) / Independent / Vincent Pallaver (write-in) / 2 / <0.01%; 147(t) / Democratic / Lincoln Pickard (write-in) / 2 / <0.01%; 147(t) / Democratic / Lynda Toth (write-in) / 2 / <0.01%; 147(t) / Republican / Donald Wang (write-in) / 2 / <0.01%; 154(t) / Democratic / Robert Gibb (write-in) / 1 / <0.01%; 154(t) / Independent / Ronald Spangler (write-in) / 1 / <0.01%; 154(t) / Independent / Kyle Conover (write-in) / 1 / <0.01%; 154(t) / Democratic / Bill Thill (write-in) / 1 / <0.01%; 154(t) / Democratic / Jurlene White (write-in) / 1 / <0.01%; 154(t) / Republican / Joel Wirth (write-in) / 1 / <0.01%
| Invalid or blank votes | | | 755,575 | 8.03% |
| Totals | | | 9,413,491 | 100.0% |
| Voter turnout | | | 61.2% | |
| | Republican gain from Democratic | | | |

Note that San Bernardino County did not report write-in votes for individual candidates.

=== Results by county ===
==== On recall question ====
| County | Yes | | No | | Margin | | Total votes cast |
| County | # | % | # | % | # | % | Total votes cast |
|---|---|---|---|---|---|---|---|
| Alameda | 126,713 | 30.01% | 295,556 | 69.99% | −168,843 | −39.98% | 422,269 |
| Alpine | 297 | 52.01% | 274 | 47.99% | 23 | 4.03% | 571 |
| Amador | 9,600 | 67.40% | 4,643 | 32.60% | 4,957 | 34.80% | 14,243 |
| Butte | 46,054 | 64.74% | 25,081 | 35.26% | 20,973 | 29.48% | 71,135 |
| Calaveras | 11,775 | 66.79% | 5,856 | 33.21% | 5,919 | 33.57% | 17,631 |
| Colusa | 3,821 | 75.10% | 1,267 | 24.90% | 2,554 | 50.20% | 5,088 |
| Contra Costa | 137,372 | 43.71% | 176,933 | 56.29% | −39,561 | −12.59% | 314,305 |
| Del Norte | 4,315 | 62.37% | 2,603 | 37.63% | 1,712 | 24.75% | 6,918 |
| El Dorado | 48,946 | 71.42% | 19,585 | 28.58% | 29,361 | 42.84% | 68,531 |
| Fresno | 122,423 | 66.70% | 61,120 | 33.30% | 61,303 | 33.40% | 183,543 |
| Glenn | 5,706 | 76.28% | 1,774 | 23.72% | 3,932 | 52.57% | 7,480 |
| Humboldt | 22,861 | 47.89% | 24,880 | 52.11% | −2,019 | −4.23% | 47,741 |
| Imperial | 14,759 | 63.38% | 8,527 | 36.62% | 6,232 | 26.76% | 23,286 |
| Inyo | 4,689 | 66.90% | 2,320 | 33.10% | 2,369 | 33.80% | 7,009 |
| Kern | 121,431 | 75.73% | 38,914 | 24.27% | 82,517 | 51.46% | 160,345 |
| Kings | 15,573 | 71.58% | 6,184 | 28.42% | 9,389 | 43.15% | 21,757 |
| Lake | 9,799 | 54.60% | 8,149 | 45.40% | 1,650 | 9.19% | 17,948 |
| Lassen | 6,671 | 75.39% | 2,178 | 24.61% | 4,493 | 50.77% | 8,849 |
| Los Angeles | 984,222 | 49.00% | 1,024,341 | 51.00% | −40,119 | −2.00% | 2,008,563 |
| Madera | 21,113 | 72.34% | 8,071 | 27.66% | 13,042 | 44.69% | 29,184 |
| Marin | 35,050 | 32.50% | 72,806 | 67.50% | −37,756 | −35.01% | 107,856 |
| Mariposa | 4,640 | 67.44% | 2,240 | 32.56% | 2,400 | 34.88% | 6,880 |
| Mendocino | 11,900 | 42.25% | 16,265 | 57.75% | −4,365 | −15.50% | 28,165 |
| Merced | 26,641 | 63.43% | 15,361 | 36.57% | 11,280 | 26.86% | 42,002 |
| Modoc | 2,544 | 74.19% | 885 | 25.81% | 1,659 | 48.38% | 3,429 |
| Mono | 2,174 | 64.05% | 1,220 | 35.95% | 954 | 28.11% | 3,394 |
| Monterey | 45,222 | 46.65% | 51,711 | 53.35% | −6,489 | −6.69% | 96,933 |
| Napa | 19,839 | 45.73% | 23,540 | 54.27% | −3,701 | −8.53% | 43,379 |
| Nevada | 27,201 | 62.85% | 16,078 | 37.15% | 11,123 | 25.70% | 43,279 |
| Orange | 589,700 | 73.31% | 214,718 | 26.69% | 374,982 | 46.62% | 804,418 |
| Placer | 88,040 | 72.06% | 34,128 | 27.94% | 53,912 | 44.13% | 122,168 |
| Plumas | 6,049 | 68.54% | 2,776 | 31.46% | 3,273 | 37.09% | 8,825 |
| Riverside | 283,923 | 70.38% | 119,485 | 29.62% | 164,438 | 40.76% | 403,408 |
| Sacramento | 226,567 | 59.62% | 153,475 | 40.38% | 73,092 | 19.23% | 380,042 |
| San Benito | 7,978 | 55.01% | 6,526 | 44.99% | 1,452 | 10.01% | 14,504 |
| San Bernardino | 259,719 | 70.06% | 111,014 | 29.94% | 148,705 | 40.11% | 370,733 |
| San Diego | 530,269 | 65.84% | 275,151 | 34.16% | 255,118 | 31.68% | 805,420 |
| San Francisco | 52,177 | 19.69% | 212,763 | 80.31% | −160,586 | −60.61% | 264,940 |
| San Joaquin | 85,153 | 61.48% | 53,347 | 38.52% | 31,806 | 22.96% | 138,500 |
| San Luis Obispo | 58,668 | 63.21% | 34,147 | 36.79% | 24,521 | 26.42% | 92,815 |
| San Mateo | 80,109 | 37.20% | 135,210 | 62.80% | −55,101 | −25.59% | 215,319 |
| Santa Barbara | 71,558 | 57.36% | 53,204 | 42.64% | 18,354 | 14.71% | 124,762 |
| Santa Clara | 182,332 | 42.12% | 250,579 | 57.88% | −68,247 | −15.76% | 432,911 |
| Santa Cruz | 32,939 | 35.59% | 59,602 | 64.41% | −26,663 | −28.81% | 92,541 |
| Shasta | 40,874 | 72.08% | 15,833 | 27.92% | 25,041 | 44.16% | 56,707 |
| Sierra | 1,007 | 68.78% | 457 | 31.22% | 550 | 37.57% | 1,464 |
| Siskiyou | 11,378 | 71.00% | 4,648 | 29.00% | 6,730 | 41.99% | 16,026 |
| Solano | 52,151 | 49.29% | 53,660 | 50.71% | −1,509 | −1.43% | 105,811 |
| Sonoma | 66,251 | 39.52% | 101,396 | 60.48% | −35,145 | −20.96% | 167,647 |
| Stanislaus | 66,938 | 62.71% | 39,805 | 37.29% | 27,133 | 25.42% | 106,743 |
| Sutter | 17,958 | 77.40% | 5,244 | 22.60% | 12,714 | 54.80% | 23,202 |
| Tehama | 13,384 | 72.99% | 4,954 | 27.01% | 8,430 | 45.97% | 18,338 |
| Trinity | 3,249 | 63.91% | 1,835 | 36.09% | 1,414 | 27.81% | 5,084 |
| Tulare | 53,893 | 72.14% | 20,818 | 27.86% | 33,075 | 44.27% | 74,711 |
| Tuolumne | 13,438 | 63.76% | 7,637 | 36.24% | 5,801 | 27.53% | 21,075 |
| Ventura | 148,538 | 63.47% | 85,484 | 36.53% | 63,054 | 26.94% | 234,022 |
| Yolo | 27,778 | 49.86% | 27,936 | 50.14% | −158 | −0.28% | 55,714 |
| Yuba | 10,905 | 75.24% | 3,589 | 24.76% | 7,316 | 50.48% | 14,494 |
| Total | 4,976,274 | 55.39% | 4,007,783 | 44.61% | 968,491 | 10.78% | 8,984,057 |

==== On replacement candidates ====
| County | Arnold Schwarzenegger Republican | | Cruz Bustamante Democratic | | Tom McClintock Republican | | Peter Camejo Green | | Arianna Huffington Independent | | All Others Various Parties | | Margin | | Total votes cast |
| County | # | % | # | % | # | % | # | % | # | % | # | % | # | % | Total votes cast |
|---|---|---|---|---|---|---|---|---|---|---|---|---|---|---|---|
| Alameda | 98,461 | 25.57% | 205,643 | 53.41% | 39,776 | 10.33% | 19,289 | 5.01% | 3,214 | 0.83% | 18,642 | 4.84% | −107,182 | −27.84% | 385,025 |
| Alpine | 267 | 52.46% | 162 | 31.83% | 36 | 7.07% | 13 | 2.55% | 5 | 0.98% | 26 | 5.11% | 105 | 20.63% | 509 |
| Amador | 8,281 | 57.92% | 2,658 | 18.59% | 2,592 | 18.13% | 374 | 2.62% | 79 | 0.55% | 313 | 2.19% | 5,623 | 39.33% | 14,297 |
| Butte | 36,910 | 53.38% | 14,893 | 21.54% | 11,759 | 17.00% | 3,075 | 4.45% | 422 | 0.61% | 2,092 | 3.03% | 22,017 | 31.84% | 69,151 |
| Calaveras | 9,410 | 53.77% | 3,587 | 20.50% | 3,431 | 19.61% | 497 | 2.84% | 74 | 0.42% | 501 | 2.86% | 5,823 | 33.27% | 17,500 |
| Colusa | 3,159 | 64.21% | 838 | 17.03% | 783 | 15.91% | 53 | 1.08% | 11 | 0.22% | 76 | 1.54% | 2,321 | 47.17% | 4,920 |
| Contra Costa | 114,187 | 39.54% | 110,824 | 38.38% | 42,152 | 14.60% | 11,229 | 3.89% | 2,072 | 0.72% | 8,320 | 2.88% | 3,363 | 1.16% | 288,784 |
| Del Norte | 3,522 | 54.98% | 1,634 | 25.51% | 782 | 12.21% | 96 | 1.50% | 19 | 0.30% | 353 | 5.51% | 1,888 | 29.47% | 6,406 |
| El Dorado | 41,572 | 61.45% | 11,211 | 16.57% | 10,532 | 15.57% | 2,103 | 3.11% | 292 | 0.43% | 1,940 | 2.87% | 30,361 | 44.88% | 67,650 |
| Fresno | 93,375 | 51.85% | 50,888 | 28.26% | 29,393 | 16.32% | 1,930 | 1.07% | 522 | 0.29% | 3,988 | 2.21% | 42,487 | 23.59% | 180,096 |
| Glenn | 4,429 | 62.64% | 1,035 | 14.64% | 1,285 | 18.18% | 68 | 0.96% | 17 | 0.24% | 236 | 3.34% | 3,144 (Note: Margin over McClintock) | 44.47% | 7,070 |
| Humboldt | 18,756 | 41.42% | 16,088 | 35.53% | 3,992 | 8.82% | 3,263 | 7.21% | 275 | 0.61% | 2,907 | 6.42% | 2,668 | 5.89% | 45,281 |
| Imperial | 9,632 | 45.76% | 7,995 | 37.98% | 2,067 | 9.82% | 115 | 0.55% | 46 | 0.22% | 1,195 | 5.68% | 1,637 | 7.78% | 21,050 |
| Inyo | 3,610 | 54.16% | 1,482 | 22.24% | 1,067 | 16.01% | 96 | 1.44% | 50 | 0.75% | 360 | 5.40% | 2,128 | 31.93% | 6,665 |
| Kern | 96,965 | 61.61% | 29,459 | 18.72% | 26,176 | 16.63% | 1,055 | 0.67% | 250 | 0.16% | 3,480 | 2.21% | 67,506 | 42.89% | 157,385 |
| Kings | 12,539 | 56.55% | 5,174 | 23.33% | 3,835 | 17.30% | 155 | 0.70% | 40 | 0.18% | 431 | 1.94% | 7,365 | 33.21% | 22,174 |
| Lake | 8,003 | 47.09% | 5,137 | 30.23% | 2,564 | 15.09% | 519 | 3.05% | 126 | 0.74% | 645 | 3.80% | 2,866 | 16.86% | 16,994 |
| Lassen | 5,167 | 60.85% | 1,306 | 15.38% | 1,505 | 17.72% | 98 | 1.15% | 20 | 0.24% | 395 | 4.65% | 3,662 | 43.13% | 8,491 |
| Los Angeles | 878,747 | 44.82% | 735,066 | 37.49% | 217,404 | 11.09% | 51,399 | 2.62% | 13,255 | 0.68% | 64,734 | 3.30% | 143,681 | 7.33% | 1,960,605 |
| Madera | 16,034 | 54.92% | 6,216 | 21.29% | 5,923 | 20.29% | 267 | 0.91% | 101 | 0.35% | 653 | 2.24% | 9,818 | 33.63% | 29,194 |
| Marin | 31,321 | 32.02% | 46,784 | 47.83% | 9,955 | 10.18% | 5,539 | 5.66% | 1,204 | 1.23% | 3,020 | 3.09% | −15,463 | −15.81% | 97,823 |
| Mariposa | 3,463 | 50.05% | 1,490 | 21.53% | 1,550 | 22.40% | 171 | 2.47% | 22 | 0.32% | 223 | 3.22% | 1,913 | 27.65% | 6,919 |
| Mendocino | 9,949 | 37.19% | 10,510 | 39.29% | 2,909 | 10.87% | 1,934 | 7.23% | 270 | 1.01% | 1,179 | 4.41% | −561 | −2.10% | 26,751 |
| Merced | 20,267 | 50.81% | 11,191 | 28.05% | 7,128 | 17.87% | 378 | 0.95% | 73 | 0.18% | 854 | 2.14% | 9,076 | 22.75% | 39,891 |
| Modoc | 1,909 | 60.49% | 453 | 14.35% | 636 | 20.15% | 30 | 0.95% | 6 | 0.19% | 122 | 3.87% | 1,273 | 40.34% | 3,156 |
| Mono | 1,859 | 56.66% | 772 | 23.53% | 430 | 13.11% | 79 | 2.41% | 18 | 0.55% | 123 | 3.75% | 1,087 | 33.13% | 3,281 |
| Monterey | 37,553 | 41.06% | 32,139 | 35.14% | 10,446 | 11.42% | 2,432 | 2.66% | 702 | 0.77% | 8,177 | 8.94% | 5,414 | 5.92% | 91,449 |
| Napa | 16,097 | 39.55% | 14,115 | 34.68% | 7,067 | 17.36% | 1,856 | 4.56% | 256 | 0.63% | 1,306 | 3.21% | 1,982 | 4.87% | 40,697 |
| Nevada | 22,607 | 53.89% | 9,534 | 22.73% | 6,610 | 15.76% | 1,851 | 4.41% | 269 | 0.64% | 1,079 | 2.57% | 13,073 | 31.16% | 41,950 |
| Orange | 493,850 | 63.49% | 130,808 | 16.82% | 119,504 | 15.36% | 11,818 | 1.52% | 2,286 | 0.29% | 19,530 | 2.51% | 363,042 | 46.68% | 777,796 |
| Placer | 74,764 | 62.78% | 19,706 | 16.55% | 18,825 | 15.81% | 3,081 | 2.59% | 525 | 0.44% | 2,181 | 1.83% | 55,058 | 46.24% | 119,082 |
| Plumas | 4,636 | 54.68% | 1,709 | 20.16% | 1,591 | 18.77% | 222 | 2.62% | 47 | 0.55% | 273 | 3.22% | 2,927 | 34.52% | 8,478 |
| Riverside | 239,584 | 60.87% | 84,683 | 21.52% | 53,998 | 13.72% | 4,235 | 1.08% | 1,136 | 0.29% | 9,933 | 2.52% | 154,901 | 39.36% | 393,569 |
| Sacramento | 195,435 | 52.34% | 98,877 | 26.48% | 52,046 | 13.94% | 14,247 | 3.82% | 1,975 | 0.53% | 10,791 | 2.89% | 96,558 | 25.86% | 373,371 |
| San Benito | 6,452 | 48.62% | 4,213 | 31.75% | 1,836 | 13.84% | 307 | 2.31% | 60 | 0.45% | 401 | 3.02% | 2,239 | 16.87% | 13,269 |
| San Bernardino | 218,989 | 60.11% | 78,718 | 21.61% | 52,636 | 14.45% | 4,575 | 1.26% | 753 | 0.21% | 8,634 | 2.37% | 140,271 | 38.50% | 364,305 |
| San Diego | 485,563 | 59.50% | 192,605 | 23.60% | 97,198 | 11.91% | 17,721 | 2.17% | 2,754 | 0.34% | 20,273 | 2.48% | 292,958 | 35.90% | 816,114 |
| San Francisco | 44,665 | 18.91% | 149,237 | 63.18% | 13,694 | 5.80% | 14,950 | 6.33% | 2,780 | 1.18% | 10,900 | 4.61% | −104,572 | −44.27% | 236,226 |
| San Joaquin | 63,905 | 48.51% | 35,868 | 27.23% | 25,699 | 19.51% | 2,117 | 1.61% | 384 | 0.29% | 3,766 | 2.86% | 28,037 | 21.28% | 131,739 |
| San Luis Obispo | 44,665 | 49.53% | 23,177 | 25.70% | 16,630 | 18.44% | 2,469 | 2.74% | 505 | 0.56% | 2,730 | 3.03% | 21,488 | 23.83% | 90,176 |
| San Mateo | 68,191 | 34.93% | 86,854 | 44.49% | 23,454 | 12.01% | 8,224 | 4.21% | 1,584 | 0.81% | 6,921 | 3.55% | −18,663 | −9.56% | 195,228 |
| Santa Barbara | 55,473 | 46.69% | 36,171 | 30.44% | 19,559 | 16.46% | 3,329 | 2.80% | 843 | 0.71% | 3,440 | 2.90% | 19,302 | 16.25% | 118,815 |
| Santa Clara | 160,807 | 39.17% | 163,768 | 39.89% | 51,069 | 12.44% | 15,694 | 3.82% | 2,335 | 0.57% | 16,875 | 4.11% | −2,961 | −0.72% | 410,548 |
| Santa Cruz | 28,926 | 33.29% | 39,828 | 45.84% | 7,735 | 8.90% | 6,044 | 6.96% | 793 | 0.91% | 3,567 | 4.11% | −10,902 | −12.55% | 86,893 |
| Shasta | 31,949 | 57.86% | 9,441 | 17.10% | 11,177 | 20.24% | 633 | 1.15% | 175 | 0.32% | 1,843 | 3.34% | 20,772 | 37.62% | 55,218 |
| Sierra | 842 | 55.87% | 269 | 17.85% | 285 | 18.91% | 46 | 3.05% | 9 | 0.60% | 56 | 3.72% | 557 | 36.96% | 1,507 |
| Siskiyou | 8,974 | 58.57% | 3,070 | 20.04% | 2,403 | 15.68% | 195 | 1.27% | 62 | 0.40% | 618 | 4.03% | 5,904 | 38.53% | 15,322 |
| Solano | 43,122 | 43.36% | 34,441 | 34.63% | 15,548 | 15.63% | 2,603 | 2.62% | 429 | 0.43% | 3,318 | 3.34% | 8,681 | 8.73% | 99,461 |
| Sonoma | 54,651 | 34.97% | 63,588 | 40.69% | 21,202 | 13.57% | 8,554 | 5.47% | 2,214 | 1.42% | 6,049 | 3.87% | −8,937 | −5.72% | 156,258 |
| Stanislaus | 46,811 | 46.47% | 25,034 | 24.85% | 24,425 | 24.25% | 1,673 | 1.66% | 425 | 0.42% | 2,355 | 2.34% | 21,777 | 21.62% | 100,723 |
| Sutter | 14,919 | 64.53% | 3,459 | 14.96% | 3,957 | 17.11% | 259 | 1.12% | 45 | 0.19% | 482 | 2.08% | 10,962 | 47.41% | 23,121 |
| Tehama | 10,038 | 58.06% | 2,772 | 16.03% | 3,586 | 20.74% | 175 | 1.01% | 65 | 0.38% | 654 | 3.78% | 6,452 | 37.32% | 17,290 |
| Trinity | 2,518 | 52.76% | 1,057 | 22.15% | 815 | 17.08% | 127 | 2.66% | 17 | 0.36% | 239 | 5.01% | 1,461 | 30.61% | 4,773 |
| Tulare | 40,678 | 55.48% | 16,943 | 23.11% | 11,391 | 15.54% | 472 | 0.64% | 107 | 0.15% | 3,731 | 5.09% | 23,735 | 32.37% | 73,322 |
| Tuolumne | 10,097 | 49.52% | 4,799 | 23.54% | 4,475 | 21.95% | 481 | 2.36% | 83 | 0.41% | 455 | 2.23% | 5,298 | 25.98% | 20,390 |
| Ventura | 116,722 | 51.49% | 53,705 | 23.69% | 44,408 | 19.59% | 4,778 | 2.11% | 911 | 0.40% | 6,183 | 2.73% | 63,017 | 27.80% | 226,707 |
| Yolo | 22,375 | 42.14% | 19,489 | 36.70% | 6,061 | 11.41% | 3,029 | 5.70% | 447 | 0.84% | 1,696 | 3.19% | 2,886 | 5.44% | 53,097 |
| Yuba | 8,632 | 61.86% | 2,301 | 16.49% | 2,295 | 16.45% | 225 | 1.61% | 46 | 0.33% | 454 | 3.25% | 6,331 | 45.37% | 13,953 |
| Total | 4,206,284 | 48.58% | 2,724,874 | 31.47% | 1,161,287 | 13.41% | 242,247 | 2.80% | 47,505 | 0.55% | 275,718 | 3.18% | 1,481,410 | 17.11% | 8,657,915 |

Counties that flipped from Democratic to Republican

- Los Angeles (largest municipality: Los Angeles)
- Contra Costa (largest municipality: Concord)
- Humboldt (largest municipality: Eureka)
- Imperial (largest municipality: El Centro)
- Lake (largest municipality: Clearlake)
- Monterey (largest municipality: Salinas)
- Napa (largest municipality: Napa)
- San Benito (largest municipality: Hollister)
- Solano (largest municipality: Vallejo)
- Yolo (largest municipality: Davis)

=== By congressional district ===
==== On recall question ====
"Yes" won 32 of 53 congressional districts, including 12 that were represented by Democrats.

| District | Yes | No | Representative |
|---|---|---|---|
| 1st | 47% | 53% | Mike Thompson |
| 2nd | 70% | 30% | Wally Herger |
| 3rd | 67% | 33% | Doug Ose |
| 4th | 70% | 30% | John Doolittle |
| 5th | 49.6% | 50.4% | Bob Matsui |
| 6th | 36% | 64% | Lynn Woolsey |
| 7th | 39% | 61% | George Miller |
| 8th | 19% | 81% | Nancy Pelosi |
| 9th | 18% | 82% | Barbara Lee |
| 10th | 47% | 53% | Ellen Tauscher |
| 11th | 61% | 39% | Richard Pombo |
| 12th | 34% | 66% | Tom Lantos |
| 13th | 37% | 63% | Pete Stark |
| 14th | 38% | 62% | Anna Eshoo |
| 15th | 44% | 56% | Mike Honda |
| 16th | 43% | 57% | Zoe Lofgren |
| 17th | 42% | 58% | Sam Farr |
| 18th | 58% | 42% | Dennis Cardoza |
| 19th | 68% | 32% | George Radanovich |
| 20th | 59% | 41% | Cal Dooley |
| 21st | 72% | 28% | Devin Nunes |
| 22nd | 77% | 23% | Bill Thomas |
| 23rd | 53% | 47% | Lois Capps |
| 24th | 67% | 33% | Elton Gallegly |
| 25th | 75% | 25% | Buck McKeon |
| 26th | 68% | 32% | David Dreier |
| 27th | 57% | 43% | Brad Sherman |
| 28th | 42% | 58% | Howard Berman |
| 29th | 51% | 49% | Adam Schiff |
| 30th | 43% | 57% | Henry Waxman |
| 31st | 32% | 68% | Xavier Becerra |
| 32nd | 50.2% | 49.8% | Hilda Solis |
| 33rd | 26% | 74% | Diane Watson |
| 34th | 43% | 57% | Lucille Roybal-Allard |
| 35th | 33% | 67% | Maxine Waters |
| 36th | 52% | 48% | Jane Harman |
| 37th | 41% | 59% | Juanita Millender-McDonald |
| 38th | 48% | 52% | Grace Napolitano |
| 39th | 54% | 46% | Linda Sánchez |
| 40th | 74% | 26% | Ed Royce |
| 41st | 74% | 26% | Jerry Lewis |
| 42nd | 76% | 24% | Gary Miller |
| 43rd | 58% | 42% | Joe Baca |
| 44th | 72% | 28% | Ken Calvert |
| 45th | 68% | 32% | Mary Bono |
| 46th | 70% | 30% | Dana Rohrabacher |
| 47th | 62% | 38% | Loretta Sanchez |
| 48th | 73% | 27% | Christopher Cox |
| 49th | 74% | 26% | Darrell Issa |
| 50th | 68% | 32% | Duke Cunningham |
| 51st | 60% | 40% | Bob Filner |
| 52nd | 72% | 28% | Duncan L. Hunter |
| 53rd | 53% | 47% | Susan Davis |

=== By city ===
==== On recall question ====
By municipality

Official outcome by city and unincorporated areas of counties, of which Yes won 367 & No won 162.
| City | County | Yes | | No | | Margin | | Total Votes | 2002 to 2003 Swing % (Note: Yes margins are compared to Republican margins from the 2002 election, and No margins are compared to Democratic margins from the 2002 election.) |
| City | County | # | % | # | % | # | % | Total Votes | 2002 to 2003 Swing % |
|---|---|---|---|---|---|---|---|---|---|
| Alameda | Alameda | 7,778 | 30.75% | 17,516 | 69.25% | −9,738 | −38.50% | 25,294 | −2.78% |
| Albany | Alameda | 1,000 | 14.62% | 5,838 | 85.38% | −4,838 | −70.75% | 6,838 | −13.31% |
| Berkeley | Alameda | 5,331 | 11.07% | 42,814 | 88.93% | −37,483 | −77.85% | 48,145 | −18.86% |
| Dublin | Alameda | 4,661 | 51.07% | 4,466 | 48.93% | 195 | 2.14% | 9,127 | 10.97% |
| Emeryville | Alameda | 446 | 18.45% | 1,971 | 81.55% | −1,525 | −63.09% | 2,417 | −8.21% |
| Fremont | Alameda | 21,185 | 42.41% | 28,765 | 57.59% | −7,580 | −15.18% | 49,950 | 14.37% |
| Hayward | Alameda | 8,952 | 33.73% | 17,587 | 66.27% | −8,635 | −32.54% | 26,539 | 10.29% |
| Livermore | Alameda | 14,334 | 55.53% | 11,479 | 44.47% | 2,855 | 11.06% | 25,813 | 10.18% |
| Newark | Alameda | 4,083 | 40.79% | 5,928 | 59.21% | −1,845 | −18.43% | 10,011 | 15.70% |
| Oakland | Alameda | 15,785 | 14.22% | 95,236 | 85.78% | −79,451 | −71.56% | 111,021 | −9.75% |
| Piedmont | Alameda | 1,892 | 32.59% | 3,914 | 67.41% | −2,022 | −34.83% | 5,806 | −11.30% |
| Pleasanton | Alameda | 12,991 | 53.23% | 11,413 | 46.77% | 1,578 | 6.47% | 24,404 | 7.18% |
| San Leandro | Alameda | 7,300 | 32.58% | 15,104 | 67.42% | −7,804 | −34.83% | 22,404 | 5.27% |
| Union City | Alameda | 4,724 | 34.33% | 9,035 | 65.67% | −4,311 | −31.33% | 13,759 | 18.31% |
| Unincorporated Area | Alameda | 16,005 | 40.15% | 23,858 | 59.85% | −7,853 | −19.70% | 39,863 | 7.32% |
| Unapportioned absentees | Alameda | 246 | 28.02% | 632 | 71.98% | −386 | −43.96% | 878 | N/A |
| Unincorporated Area | Alpine | 297 | 52.01% | 274 | 47.99% | 23 | 4.03% | 571 | 0.82% |
| Amador | Amador | 59 | 65.56% | 31 | 34.44% | 28 | 31.11% | 90 | 3.52% |
| Ione | Amador | 923 | 73.84% | 327 | 26.16% | 596 | 47.68% | 1,250 | 20.60% |
| Jackson | Amador | 950 | 62.17% | 578 | 37.83% | 372 | 24.35% | 1,528 | 13.67% |
| Plymouth | Amador | 247 | 69.97% | 106 | 30.03% | 141 | 39.94% | 353 | 29.15% |
| Sutter Creek | Amador | 683 | 62.49% | 410 | 37.51% | 273 | 24.98% | 1093 | 12.49% |
| Unincorporated Area | Amador | 4,164 | 68.26% | 1,936 | 31.74% | 2,228 | 36.52% | 6,100 | 15.13% |
| Unapportioned absentees | Amador | 2,574 | 67.22% | 1,255 | 32.78% | 1,319 | 34.45% | 3,829 | N/A |
| Biggs | Butte | 316 | 74.88% | 106 | 25.12% | 210 | 49.76% | 422 | 23.98% |
| Chico | Butte | 10,936 | 55.37% | 8,814 | 44.63% | 2,122 | 10.74% | 19,750 | −0.15% |
| Gridley | Butte | 832 | 68.87% | 376 | 31.13% | 456 | 37.75% | 1,208 | 20.85% |
| Oroville | Butte | 2,028 | 68.19% | 946 | 31.81% | 1,082 | 36.38% | 2,974 | 18.54% |
| Paradise | Butte | 7,443 | 66.63% | 3,728 | 33.37% | 3,715 | 33.26% | 11,171 | 10.36% |
| Unincorporated Area | Butte | 24,499 | 68.80% | 11,111 | 31.20% | 13,388 | 37.60% | 35,610 | 10.28% |
| Angels | Calaveras | 469 | 65.14% | 251 | 34.86% | 218 | 30.28% | 720 | 4.95% |
| Unincorporated Area | Calaveras | 6,234 | 67.79% | 2,962 | 32.21% | 3,272 | 35.58% | 9,196 | 14.29% |
| Unapportioned absentees | Calaveras | 5,072 | 65.74% | 2,643 | 34.26% | 2,429 | 31.48% | 7,715 | 13.87% |
| Colusa | Colusa | 1,148 | 71.26% | 463 | 28.74% | 685 | 42.52% | 1,611 | 10.66% |
| Williams | Colusa | 368 | 71.18% | 149 | 28.82% | 219 | 42.36% | 517 | 20.04% |
| Unincorporated Area | Colusa | 2,305 | 77.87% | 655 | 22.13% | 1,650 | 55.74% | 2,960 | 13.37% |
| Antioch | Contra Costa | 11,428 | 47.81% | 12,474 | 52.19% | −1,046 | −4.38% | 23,902 | 16.21% |
| Brentwood | Contra Costa | 5,652 | 58.06% | 4,082 | 41.94% | 1,570 | 16.13% | 9,734 | 13.80% |
| Clayton | Contra Costa | 2,982 | 57.29% | 2,223 | 42.71% | 759 | 14.58% | 5,205 | 6.82% |
| Concord | Contra Costa | 15,957 | 45.19% | 19,356 | 54.81% | −3,399 | −9.63% | 35,313 | 6.57% |
| Danville | Contra Costa | 10,873 | 57.27% | 8,111 | 42.73% | 2,762 | 14.55% | 18,984 | 4.32% |
| El Cerrito | Contra Costa | 1,933 | 19.27% | 8,097 | 80.73% | −6,164 | −61.46% | 10,030 | −9.99% |
| Hercules | Contra Costa | 1,870 | 32.28% | 3,923 | 67.72% | −2,053 | −35.44% | 5,793 | 9.44% |
| Lafayette | Contra Costa | 5,266 | 44.82% | 6,483 | 55.18% | −1,217 | −10.36% | 11,749 | −4.84% |
| Martinez | Contra Costa | 6,073 | 42.98% | 8,058 | 57.02% | −1,985 | −14.05% | 14,131 | 6.35% |
| Moraga | Contra Costa | 3,585 | 47.51% | 3,960 | 52.49% | −375 | −4.97% | 7,545 | −5.68% |
| Oakley | Contra Costa | 3,498 | 54.61% | 2,907 | 45.39% | 591 | 9.23% | 6,405 | 18.55% |
| Orinda | Contra Costa | 4,387 | 45.14% | 5,332 | 54.86% | −945 | −9.72% | 9,719 | −5.04% |
| Pinole | Contra Costa | 2,217 | 36.39% | 3,875 | 63.61% | −1,658 | −27.22% | 6,092 | 5.53% |
| Pittsburg | Contra Costa | 4,229 | 35.31% | 7,748 | 64.69% | −3,519 | −29.38% | 11,977 | 13.24% |
| Pleasant Hill | Contra Costa | 5,346 | 42.53% | 7,224 | 57.47% | −1,878 | −14.94% | 12,570 | 4.05% |
| Richmond | Contra Costa | 4,432 | 19.80% | 17,957 | 80.20% | −13,525 | −60.41% | 22,389 | 4.10% |
| San Pablo | Contra Costa | 958 | 25.92% | 2,738 | 74.08% | −1,780 | −48.16% | 3,696 | 9.98% |
| San Ramon | Contra Costa | 9,203 | 53.98% | 7,846 | 46.02% | 1,357 | 7.96% | 17,049 | 8.57% |
| Walnut Creek | Contra Costa | 13,098 | 44.45% | 16,370 | 55.55% | −3,272 | −11.10% | 29,468 | −1.62% |
| Unincorporated Area | Contra Costa | 24,385 | 46.40% | 28,169 | 53.60% | −3,784 | −7.20% | 52,554 | 3.52% |
| Crescent City | Del Norte | 510 | 61.15% | 324 | 38.85% | 186 | 22.30% | 834 | 32.18% |
| Unincorporated Area | Del Norte | 3,805 | 62.54% | 2,279 | 37.46% | 1,526 | 25.08% | 6,084 | 20.83% |
| Placerville | El Dorado | 2,417 | 66.99% | 1,191 | 33.01% | 1,226 | 33.98% | 3,608 | 16.45% |
| South Lake Tahoe | El Dorado | 2,311 | 54.45% | 1,933 | 45.55% | 378 | 8.91% | 4,244 | 13.57% |
| Unincorporated Area | El Dorado | 44,218 | 72.87% | 16,461 | 27.13% | 27,757 | 45.74% | 60,679 | 12.73% |
| Clovis | Fresno | 17,904 | 76.33% | 5,551 | 23.67% | 12,353 | 52.67% | 23,455 | 13.46% |
| Coalinga | Fresno | 1,390 | 69.36% | 614 | 30.64% | 776 | 38.72% | 2,004 | 20.54% |
| Firebaugh | Fresno | 424 | 58.97% | 295 | 41.03% | 129 | 17.94% | 719 | 38.98% |
| Fowler | Fresno | 541 | 60.65% | 351 | 39.35% | 190 | 21.30% | 892 | 17.36% |
| Fresno | Fresno | 56,710 | 62.69% | 33,756 | 37.31% | 22,954 | 25.37% | 90,466 | 16.97% |
| Huron | Fresno | 125 | 32.13% | 264 | 67.87% | −139 | −35.73% | 389 | 41.19% |
| Kerman | Fresno | 875 | 63.18% | 510 | 36.82% | 365 | 26.35% | 1,385 | 28.98% |
| Kingsburg | Fresno | 2,426 | 77.83% | 691 | 22.17% | 1,735 | 55.66% | 3,117 | 11.83% |
| Mendota | Fresno | 288 | 42.79% | 385 | 57.21% | −97 | −14.41% | 673 | 49.39% |
| Orange Cove | Fresno | 272 | 42.70% | 365 | 57.30% | −93 | −14.60% | 637 | 31.16% |
| Parlier | Fresno | 434 | 40.94% | 626 | 59.06% | −192 | −18.11% | 1,060 | 51.47% |
| Reedley | Fresno | 2,754 | 66.14% | 1,410 | 33.86% | 1,344 | 32.28% | 4,164 | 14.88% |
| San Joaquin | Fresno | 83 | 39.71% | 126 | 60.29% | −43 | −20.57% | 209 | 33.06% |
| Sanger | Fresno | 1,765 | 53.02% | 1,564 | 46.98% | 201 | 6.04% | 3,329 | 30.94% |
| Selma | Fresno | 2,097 | 59.52% | 1,426 | 40.48% | 671 | 19.05% | 3,523 | 22.98% |
| Unincorporated Area | Fresno | 34,335 | 72.25% | 13,186 | 27.75% | 21,149 | 44.50% | 47,521 | 10.44% |
| Orland | Glenn | 1,111 | 74.31% | 384 | 25.69% | 727 | 48.63% | 1,495 | 17.20% |
| Willows | Glenn | 1,190 | 72.47% | 452 | 27.53% | 738 | 44.95% | 1,642 | 15.96% |
| Unincorporated Area | Glenn | 3,405 | 78.40% | 938 | 21.60% | 2,467 | 56.80% | 4,343 | 10.24% |
| Arcata | Humboldt | 1,545 | 24.91% | 4,657 | 75.09% | −3,112 | −50.18% | 6,202 | −18.05% |
| Eureka | Humboldt | 9,819 | 51.20% | 9,357 | 48.80% | 462 | 2.41% | 19,176 | 11.07% |
| Fortuna | Humboldt | 1,670 | 66.53% | 840 | 33.47% | 830 | 33.07% | 2,510 | 23.42% |
| Rio Dell | Humboldt | 403 | 69.13% | 180 | 30.87% | 223 | 38.25% | 583 | 24.79% |
| Unincorporated Area | Humboldt | 9,424 | 48.91% | 9,846 | 51.09% | −422 | −2.19% | 19,270 | 2.16% |
| Brawley | Imperial | 1,941 | 61.99% | 1,190 | 38.01% | 751 | 23.99% | 3,131 | 40.17% |
| Calexico | Imperial | 1,446 | 46.07% | 1,693 | 53.93% | −247 | −7.87% | 3,139 | 58.85% |
| Calipatria | Imperial | 226 | 57.36% | 168 | 42.64% | 58 | 14.72% | 394 | 39.87% |
| El Centro | Imperial | 3,150 | 62.30% | 1,906 | 37.70% | 1,244 | 24.60% | 5,056 | 40.89% |
| Holtville | Imperial | 502 | 65.54% | 264 | 34.46% | 238 | 31.07% | 766 | 38.12% |
| Imperial | Imperial | 1,119 | 71.73% | 441 | 28.27% | 678 | 43.46% | 1,560 | 38.08% |
| Westmorland | Imperial | 150 | 55.15% | 122 | 44.85% | 28 | 10.29% | 272 | 40.90% |
| Unincorporated Area | Imperial | 1,603 | 68.83% | 726 | 31.17% | 877 | 37.66% | 2,329 | 25.89% |
| Unapportioned absentees | Imperial | 4,622 | 69.62% | 2,017 | 30.38% | 2,605 | 39.24% | 6,639 | 36.24% |
| Bishop | Inyo | 722 | 62.62% | 431 | 37.38% | 291 | 25.24% | 1,153 | 6.06% |
| Unincorporated Area | Inyo | 3,967 | 67.74% | 1,889 | 32.26% | 2,078 | 35.48% | 5,856 | 11.63% |
| Arvin | Kern | 638 | 49.69% | 646 | 50.31% | −8 | −0.62% | 1,284 | 43.96% |
| Bakersfield | Kern | 51,113 | 75.42% | 16,662 | 24.58% | 34,451 | 50.83% | 67,775 | 21.99% |
| California City | Kern | 1,992 | 80.68% | 477 | 19.32% | 1,515 | 61.36% | 2,469 | 27.01% |
| Delano | Kern | 2,154 | 51.61% | 2,020 | 48.39% | 134 | 3.21% | 4,174 | 40.54% |
| Maricopa | Kern | 237 | 84.04% | 45 | 15.96% | 192 | 68.09% | 282 | 36.86% |
| McFarland | Kern | 496 | 52.60% | 447 | 47.40% | 49 | 5.20% | 943 | 42.70% |
| Ridgecrest | Kern | 6,744 | 78.37% | 1,861 | 21.63% | 4,883 | 56.75% | 8,605 | 22.19% |
| Shafter | Kern | 1,472 | 68.91% | 664 | 31.09% | 808 | 37.83% | 2,136 | 27.96% |
| Taft | Kern | 1,644 | 86.34% | 260 | 13.66% | 1,384 | 72.69% | 1,904 | 22.77% |
| Tehachapi | Kern | 1,458 | 72.94% | 541 | 27.06% | 917 | 45.87% | 1,999 | 25.93% |
| Wasco | Kern | 1,466 | 63.57% | 840 | 36.43% | 626 | 27.15% | 2,306 | 37.81% |
| Unincorporated Area | Kern | 52,017 | 78.26% | 14,451 | 21.74% | 37,566 | 56.52% | 66,468 | 24.70% |
| Avenal | Kings | 306 | 58.73% | 215 | 41.27% | 91 | 17.47% | 521 | 31.47% |
| Corcoran | Kings | 832 | 57.50% | 615 | 42.50% | 217 | 15.00% | 1,447 | 26.65% |
| Hanford | Kings | 7,003 | 71.31% | 2,817 | 28.69% | 4,186 | 42.63% | 9,820 | 20.90% |
| Lemoore | Kings | 3,082 | 74.81% | 1,038 | 25.19% | 2,044 | 49.61% | 4,120 | 23.36% |
| Unincorporated Area | Kings | 4,350 | 74.37% | 1,499 | 25.63% | 2,851 | 48.74% | 5,849 | 21.07% |
| Clearlake | Lake | 1,328 | 48.41% | 1,415 | 51.59% | −87 | −3.17% | 2,743 | 24.63% |
| Lakeport | Lake | 881 | 56.22% | 686 | 43.78% | 195 | 12.44% | 1,567 | 12.37% |
| Unincorporated Area | Lake | 7,590 | 55.65% | 6,048 | 44.35% | 1,542 | 11.31% | 13,638 | 13.57% |
| Susanville | Lassen | 1,971 | 72.76% | 738 | 27.24% | 1,233 | 45.51% | 2,709 | 25.53% |
| Unincorporated Area | Lassen | 4,700 | 76.55% | 1,440 | 23.45% | 3,260 | 53.09% | 6,140 | 23.04% |
| Agoura Hills | Los Angeles | 3,739 | 62.16% | 2,276 | 37.84% | 1,463 | 24.32% | 6,015 | 21.04% |
| Alhambra | Los Angeles | 7,203 | 46.79% | 8,191 | 53.21% | −988 | −6.42% | 15,394 | 22.36% |
| Arcadia | Los Angeles | 17,001 | 65.97% | 8,768 | 34.03% | 8,233 | 31.95% | 25,769 | 10.83% |
| Artesia | Los Angeles | 4,637 | 59.18% | 3,198 | 40.82% | 1,439 | 18.37% | 7,835 | 31.33% |
| Avalon | Los Angeles | 3,931 | 60.57% | 2,559 | 39.43% | 1,372 | 21.14% | 6,490 | 8.13% |
| Azusa | Los Angeles | 5,046 | 57.13% | 3,786 | 42.87% | 1,260 | 14.27% | 8,832 | 27.05% |
| Baldwin Park | Los Angeles | 4,059 | 41.78% | 5,656 | 58.22% | −1,597 | −16.44% | 9,715 | 28.65% |
| Bell | Los Angeles | 1,583 | 33.96% | 3,079 | 66.04% | −1,496 | −32.09% | 4,662 | 18.82% |
| Bell Gardens | Los Angeles | 932 | 30.40% | 2,134 | 69.60% | −1,202 | −39.20% | 3,066 | 17.57% |
| Bellflower | Los Angeles | 7,728 | 59.31% | 5,301 | 40.69% | 2,427 | 18.63% | 13,029 | 29.09% |
| Beverly Hills | Los Angeles | 8,234 | 35.96% | 14,661 | 64.04% | −6,427 | −28.07% | 22,895 | 5.15% |
| Burbank | Los Angeles | 22,143 | 58.51% | 15,705 | 41.49% | 6,438 | 17.01% | 37,848 | 20.25% |
| Calabasas | Los Angeles | 2,917 | 55.77% | 2,313 | 44.23% | 604 | 11.55% | 5,230 | 19.86% |
| Carson | Los Angeles | 8,344 | 40.39% | 12,316 | 59.61% | −3,972 | −19.23% | 20,660 | 32.36% |
| Cerritos | Los Angeles | 6,076 | 59.59% | 4,121 | 40.41% | 1,955 | 19.17% | 10,197 | 26.01% |
| Claremont | Los Angeles | 9,505 | 54.22% | 8,027 | 45.78% | 1,478 | 8.43% | 17,532 | 12.46% |
| Commerce | Los Angeles | 680 | 34.02% | 1,319 | 65.98% | −639 | −31.97% | 1,999 | 32.02% |
| Compton | Los Angeles | 2,636 | 20.77% | 10,058 | 79.23% | −7,422 | −58.47% | 12,694 | 20.27% |
| Covina | Los Angeles | 12,297 | 63.34% | 7,118 | 36.66% | 5,179 | 26.68% | 19,415 | 16.81% |
| Cudahy | Los Angeles | 583 | 31.95% | 1,242 | 68.05% | −659 | −36.11% | 1,825 | 17.41% |
| Culver City | Los Angeles | 8,091 | 29.94% | 18,935 | 70.06% | −10,844 | −40.12% | 27,026 | −4.84% |
| Diamond Bar | Los Angeles | 11,063 | 66.03% | 5,692 | 33.97% | 5,371 | 32.06% | 16,755 | 23.61% |
| Downey | Los Angeles | 12,631 | 60.03% | 8,411 | 39.97% | 4,220 | 20.06% | 21,042 | 21.46% |
| Duarte | Los Angeles | 3,067 | 56.75% | 2,337 | 43.25% | 730 | 13.51% | 5,404 | 21.63% |
| El Monte | Los Angeles | 6,954 | 44.12% | 8,807 | 55.88% | −1,853 | −11.76% | 15,761 | 29.53% |
| El Segundo | Los Angeles | 17,826 | 60.18% | 11,793 | 39.82% | 6,033 | 20.37% | 29,619 | 2.55% |
| Gardena | Los Angeles | 3,378 | 42.22% | 4,623 | 57.78% | −1,245 | −15.56% | 8,001 | 27.52% |
| Glendale | Los Angeles | 18,087 | 58.58% | 12,788 | 41.42% | 5,299 | 17.16% | 30,875 | 17.61% |
| Glendora | Los Angeles | 9,811 | 75.16% | 3,242 | 24.84% | 6,569 | 50.33% | 13,053 | 17.39% |
| Hawaiian Gardens | Los Angeles | 363 | 41.63% | 509 | 58.37% | −146 | −16.74% | 872 | 20.35% |
| Hawthorne | Los Angeles | 4,590 | 40.77% | 6,668 | 59.23% | −2,078 | −18.46% | 11,258 | 22.11% |
| Hermosa Beach | Los Angeles | 3,550 | 57.24% | 2,652 | 42.76% | 898 | 14.48% | 6,202 | 13.95% |
| Hidden Hills | Los Angeles | 420 | 62.04% | 257 | 37.96% | 163 | 24.08% | 677 | 14.82% |
| Huntington Park | Los Angeles | 1,739 | 30.59% | 3,945 | 69.41% | −2,206 | −38.81% | 5,684 | 16.75% |
| Industry | Los Angeles | 2 | 100.00% | 0 | 0.00% | 2 | 100.00% | 2 | 50.00% |
| Inglewood | Los Angeles | 3,538 | 21.97% | 12,564 | 78.03% | −9,026 | −56.06% | 16,102 | 16.95% |
| La Canada Flintridge | Los Angeles | 3,725 | 65.07% | 2,000 | 34.93% | 1,725 | 30.13% | 5,725 | 3.88% |
| La Habra Heights | Los Angeles | 1,363 | 77.49% | 396 | 22.51% | 967 | 54.97% | 1,759 | 4.01% |
| La Mirada | Los Angeles | 9,257 | 69.00% | 4,159 | 31.00% | 5,098 | 38.00% | 13,416 | 19.82% |
| La Puente | Los Angeles | 1,845 | 43.31% | 2,415 | 56.69% | −570 | −13.38% | 4,260 | 33.32% |
| La Verne | Los Angeles | 6,451 | 70.40% | 2,713 | 29.60% | 3,738 | 40.79% | 9,164 | 22.63% |
| Lakewood | Los Angeles | 14,620 | 65.55% | 7,685 | 34.45% | 6,935 | 31.09% | 22,305 | 25.71% |
| Lancaster | Los Angeles | 13,613 | 75.39% | 4,444 | 24.61% | 9,169 | 50.78% | 18,057 | 20.23% |
| Lawndale | Los Angeles | 1,516 | 49.48% | 1,548 | 50.52% | −32 | −1.04% | 3,064 | 22.95% |
| Lomita | Los Angeles | 2,990 | 66.44% | 1,510 | 33.56% | 1,480 | 32.89% | 4,500 | 26.02% |
| Long Beach | Los Angeles | 42,635 | 51.93% | 39,472 | 48.07% | 3,163 | 3.85% | 82,107 | 17.81% |
| Los Angeles | Los Angeles | 271,075 | 40.33% | 401,142 | 59.67% | −130,067 | −19.35% | 672,217 | 15.94% |
| Lynwood | Los Angeles | 2,023 | 27.14% | 5,431 | 72.86% | −3,408 | −45.72% | 7,454 | 20.52% |
| Malibu | Los Angeles | 1,852 | 51.82% | 1,722 | 48.18% | 130 | 3.64% | 3,574 | 2.63% |
| Manhattan Beach | Los Angeles | 6,816 | 58.39% | 4,857 | 41.61% | 1,959 | 16.78% | 11,673 | 9.68% |
| Maywood | Los Angeles | 657 | 28.05% | 1,685 | 71.95% | −1,028 | −43.89% | 2,342 | 14.99% |
| Monrovia | Los Angeles | 4,764 | 62.09% | 2,909 | 37.91% | 1,855 | 24.18% | 7,673 | 16.35% |
| Montebello | Los Angeles | 4,262 | 40.88% | 6,164 | 59.12% | −1,902 | −18.24% | 10,426 | 23.78% |
| Monterey Park | Los Angeles | 4,284 | 46.37% | 4,954 | 53.63% | −670 | −7.25% | 9,238 | 28.30% |
| Norwalk | Los Angeles | 8,760 | 53.12% | 7,731 | 46.88% | 1,029 | 6.24% | 16,491 | 33.51% |
| Palmdale | Los Angeles | 12,427 | 71.05% | 5,063 | 28.95% | 7,364 | 42.10% | 17,490 | 28.36% |
| Palos Verdes Estates | Los Angeles | 3,501 | 67.22% | 1,707 | 32.78% | 1,794 | 34.45% | 5,208 | 0.52% |
| Paramount | Los Angeles | 2,410 | 40.59% | 3,528 | 59.41% | −1,118 | −18.83% | 5,938 | 24.47% |
| Pasadena | Los Angeles | 12,213 | 43.99% | 15,548 | 56.01% | −3,335 | −12.01% | 27,761 | 5.40% |
| Pico Rivera | Los Angeles | 4,352 | 41.60% | 6,109 | 58.40% | −1,757 | −16.80% | 10,461 | 29.52% |
| Pomona | Los Angeles | 9,580 | 48.93% | 9,998 | 51.07% | −418 | −2.14% | 19,578 | 26.44% |
| Rancho Palos Verdes | Los Angeles | 6,682 | 64.19% | 3,727 | 35.81% | 2,955 | 28.39% | 10,409 | 7.92% |
| Redondo Beach | Los Angeles | 9,399 | 59.77% | 6,325 | 40.23% | 3,074 | 19.55% | 15,724 | 15.18% |
| Rolling Hills | Los Angeles | 561 | 77.92% | 159 | 22.08% | 402 | 55.83% | 720 | −2.00% |
| Rolling Hills Estates | Los Angeles | 1,146 | 71.89% | 448 | 28.11% | 698 | 43.79% | 1,594 | 9.35% |
| Rosemead | Los Angeles | 2,536 | 45.69% | 3,015 | 54.31% | −479 | −8.63% | 5,551 | 31.42% |
| San Dimas | Los Angeles | 6,635 | 71.71% | 2,618 | 28.29% | 4,017 | 43.41% | 9,253 | 20.14% |
| San Fernando | Los Angeles | 4,900 | 47.72% | 5,368 | 52.28% | −468 | −4.56% | 10,268 | 36.04% |
| San Gabriel | Los Angeles | 2,785 | 54.46% | 2,329 | 45.54% | 456 | 8.92% | 5,114 | 22.12% |
| San Marino | Los Angeles | 3,423 | 69.22% | 1,522 | 30.78% | 1,901 | 38.44% | 4,945 | −0.17% |
| Santa Clarita | Los Angeles | 31,643 | 75.70% | 10,159 | 24.30% | 21,484 | 51.39% | 41,802 | 24.85% |
| Santa Fe Springs | Los Angeles | 1,881 | 50.93% | 1,812 | 49.07% | 69 | 1.87% | 3,693 | 38.36% |
| Santa Monica | Los Angeles | 8,452 | 33.08% | 17,096 | 66.92% | −8,644 | −33.83% | 25,548 | 1.69% |
| Sierra Madre | Los Angeles | 810 | 58.57% | 573 | 41.43% | 237 | 17.14% | 1,383 | 1.57% |
| Signal Hill | Los Angeles | 686 | 57.50% | 507 | 42.50% | 179 | 15.00% | 1,193 | 30.00% |
| South El Monte | Los Angeles | 1,188 | 39.44% | 1,824 | 60.56% | −636 | −21.12% | 3,012 | 33.06% |
| South Gate | Los Angeles | 4,387 | 35.66% | 7,916 | 64.34% | −3,529 | −28.68% | 12,303 | 23.41% |
| South Pasadena | Los Angeles | 4,008 | 45.85% | 4,733 | 54.15% | −725 | −8.29% | 8,741 | 4.11% |
| Temple City | Los Angeles | 3,967 | 63.28% | 2,302 | 36.72% | 1,665 | 26.56% | 6,269 | 25.17% |
| Torrance | Los Angeles | 20,236 | 65.51% | 10,654 | 34.49% | 9,582 | 31.02% | 30,890 | 20.56% |
| Walnut | Los Angeles | 4,693 | 63.99% | 2,641 | 36.01% | 2,052 | 27.98% | 7,334 | 29.56% |
| West Covina | Los Angeles | 9,113 | 58.97% | 6,341 | 41.03% | 2,772 | 17.94% | 15,454 | 27.35% |
| West Hollywood | Los Angeles | 3,011 | 26.65% | 8,288 | 73.35% | −5,277 | −46.70% | 11,299 | 16.27% |
| Westlake Village | Los Angeles | 1,722 | 65.18% | 920 | 34.82% | 802 | 30.36% | 2,642 | 10.42% |
| Whittier | Los Angeles | 12,146 | 63.86% | 6,873 | 36.14% | 5,273 | 27.72% | 19,019 | 17.71% |
| Unincorporated Area | Los Angeles | 156,837 | 51.75% | 146,250 | 48.25% | 10,587 | 3.49% | 303,087 | 18.92% |
| Chowchilla | Madera | 1,182 | 72.74% | 443 | 27.26% | 739 | 45.48% | 1,625 | 19.68% |
| Madera | Madera | 4,381 | 63.46% | 2,523 | 36.54% | 1,858 | 26.91% | 6,904 | 22.90% |
| Unincorporated Area | Madera | 15,550 | 75.28% | 5,105 | 24.72% | 10,445 | 50.57% | 20,655 | 11.43% |
| Belvedere | Marin | 314 | 48.91% | 328 | 51.09% | −14 | −2.18% | 642 | −11.00% |
| Corte Madera | Marin | 820 | 29.30% | 1,979 | 70.70% | −1,159 | −41.41% | 2,799 | −2.56% |
| Fairfax | Marin | 468 | 17.25% | 2,245 | 82.75% | −1,777 | −65.50% | 2,713 | −16.74% |
| Larkspur | Marin | 1,162 | 31.52% | 2,524 | 68.48% | −1,362 | −36.95% | 3,686 | −8.72% |
| Mill Valley | Marin | 997 | 22.37% | 3,460 | 77.63% | −2,463 | −55.26% | 4,457 | −8.45% |
| Novato | Marin | 5,049 | 42.35% | 6,873 | 57.65% | −1,824 | −15.30% | 11,922 | 2.91% |
| Ross | Marin | 343 | 44.60% | 426 | 55.40% | −83 | −10.79% | 769 | −8.01% |
| San Anselmo | Marin | 859 | 21.57% | 3,124 | 78.43% | −2,265 | −56.87% | 3,983 | −12.41% |
| San Rafael | Marin | 17,612 | 33.59% | 34,824 | 66.41% | −17,212 | −32.82% | 52,436 | −5.05% |
| Sausalito | Marin | 671 | 28.90% | 1,651 | 71.10% | −980 | −42.20% | 2,322 | −12.08% |
| Tiburon | Marin | 998 | 40.54% | 1,464 | 59.46% | −466 | −18.93% | 2,462 | −3.07% |
| Unincorporated Area | Marin | 5,718 | 29.31% | 13,788 | 70.69% | −8,070 | −41.37% | 19,506 | −14.57% |
| Unapportioned absentees | Marin | 39 | 24.53% | 120 | 75.47% | −81 | −50.94% | 159 | N/A |
| Unincorporated Area | Mariposa | 4,640 | 67.44% | 2,240 | 32.56% | 2,400 | 34.88% | 6,880 | 10.30% |
| Fort Bragg | Mendocino | 765 | 38.73% | 1,210 | 61.27% | −445 | −22.53% | 1,975 | −0.80% |
| Point Arena | Mendocino | 41 | 30.37% | 94 | 69.63% | −53 | −39.26% | 135 | −17.71% |
| Ukiah | Mendocino | 1,907 | 44.85% | 2,345 | 55.15% | −438 | −10.30% | 4,252 | 1.45% |
| Willits | Mendocino | 538 | 43.81% | 690 | 56.19% | −152 | −12.38% | 1,228 | −3.19% |
| Unincorporated Area | Mendocino | 8,649 | 42.04% | 11,926 | 57.96% | −3,277 | −15.93% | 20,575 | −7.43% |
| Atwater | Merced | 3,387 | 65.40% | 1,792 | 34.60% | 1,595 | 30.80% | 5,179 | 25.98% |
| Dos Palos | Merced | 612 | 69.00% | 275 | 31.00% | 337 | 37.99% | 887 | 34.17% |
| Gustine | Merced | 783 | 57.24% | 585 | 42.76% | 198 | 14.47% | 1,368 | 24.98% |
| Livingston | Merced | 465 | 42.39% | 632 | 57.61% | −167 | −15.22% | 1,097 | 39.58% |
| Los Banos | Merced | 3,127 | 60.23% | 2,065 | 39.77% | 1,062 | 20.45% | 5,192 | 26.44% |
| Merced | Merced | 7,551 | 60.02% | 5,030 | 39.98% | 2,521 | 20.04% | 12,581 | 24.57% |
| Unincorporated Area | Merced | 10,716 | 68.26% | 4,982 | 31.74% | 5,734 | 36.53% | 15,698 | 20.06% |
| Alturas | Modoc | 655 | 68.02% | 308 | 31.98% | 347 | 36.03% | 963 | 13.90% |
| Unincorporated Area | Modoc | 1,889 | 76.60% | 577 | 23.40% | 1,312 | 53.20% | 2,466 | 9.98% |
| Mammoth Lakes | Mono | 989 | 59.69% | 668 | 40.31% | 321 | 19.37% | 1,657 | 10.84% |
| Unincorporated Area | Mono | 1,185 | 68.22% | 552 | 31.78% | 633 | 36.44% | 1,737 | 13.95% |
| Carmel-by-the-Sea | Monterey | 1,071 | 47.22% | 1,197 | 52.78% | −126 | −5.56% | 2,268 | −5.66% |
| Del Rey Oaks | Monterey | 335 | 42.89% | 446 | 57.11% | −111 | −14.21% | 781 | 12.28% |
| Gonzales | Monterey | 490 | 39.48% | 751 | 60.52% | −261 | −21.03% | 1,241 | 21.87% |
| Greenfield | Monterey | 514 | 33.66% | 1,013 | 66.34% | −499 | −32.68% | 1,527 | 17.38% |
| King City | Monterey | 688 | 49.46% | 703 | 50.54% | −15 | −1.08% | 1,391 | 15.90% |
| Marina | Monterey | 2,248 | 47.31% | 2,504 | 52.69% | −256 | −5.39% | 4,752 | 19.17% |
| Monterey | Monterey | 3,803 | 40.82% | 5,513 | 59.18% | −1,710 | −18.36% | 9,316 | 2.40% |
| Pacific Grove | Monterey | 2,450 | 36.25% | 4,309 | 63.75% | −1,859 | −27.50% | 6,759 | −0.38% |
| Salinas | Monterey | 12,178 | 46.35% | 14,094 | 53.65% | −1,916 | −7.29% | 26,272 | 19.76% |
| Sand City | Monterey | 22 | 46.81% | 25 | 53.19% | −3 | −6.38% | 47 | −10.30% |
| Seaside | Monterey | 2,147 | 39.62% | 3,272 | 60.38% | −1,125 | −20.76% | 5,419 | 17.62% |
| Soledad | Monterey | 631 | 36.54% | 1,096 | 63.46% | −465 | −26.93% | 1,727 | 25.67% |
| Unincorporated Area | Monterey | 18,645 | 52.62% | 16,788 | 47.38% | 1,857 | 5.24% | 35,433 | 5.16% |
| American Canyon | Napa | 1,030 | 43.15% | 1,357 | 56.85% | −327 | −13.70% | 2,387 | 17.52% |
| Calistoga | Napa | 360 | 37.11% | 610 | 62.89% | −250 | −25.77% | 970 | −6.32% |
| Napa | Napa | 7,013 | 43.89% | 8,965 | 56.11% | −1,952 | −12.22% | 15,978 | 2.19% |
| St. Helena | Napa | 669 | 41.92% | 927 | 58.08% | −258 | −16.17% | 1,596 | 0.11% |
| Yountville | Napa | 395 | 38.28% | 637 | 61.72% | −242 | −23.45% | 1,032 | 3.88% |
| Unincorporated Area | Napa | 3,975 | 51.61% | 3,727 | 48.39% | 248 | 3.22% | 7,702 | −1.14% |
| Unapportioned absentees | Napa | 6,397 | 46.65% | 7,317 | 53.35% | −920 | −6.71% | 13,714 | 2.86% |
| Grass Valley | Nevada | 2,470 | 59.11% | 1,709 | 40.89% | 761 | 18.21% | 4,179 | 11.26% |
| Nevada City | Nevada | 649 | 45.83% | 767 | 54.17% | −118 | −8.33% | 1,416 | −1.26% |
| Truckee | Nevada | 2,562 | 51.94% | 2,371 | 48.06% | 191 | 3.87% | 4,933 | 7.69% |
| Unincorporated Area | Nevada | 21,520 | 65.71% | 11,231 | 34.29% | 10,289 | 31.42% | 32,751 | 7.10% |
| Aliso Viejo | Orange | 9,830 | 76.79% | 2,971 | 23.21% | 6,859 | 53.58% | 12,801 | 29.66% |
| Anaheim | Orange | 45,574 | 72.22% | 17,527 | 27.78% | 28,047 | 44.45% | 63,101 | 29.16% |
| Brea | Orange | 10,455 | 78.27% | 2,903 | 21.73% | 7,552 | 56.54% | 13,358 | 21.73% |
| Buena Park | Orange | 11,438 | 70.78% | 4,721 | 29.22% | 6,717 | 41.57% | 16,159 | 33.14% |
| Costa Mesa | Orange | 19,994 | 72.45% | 7,603 | 27.55% | 12,391 | 44.90% | 27,597 | 21.27% |
| Cypress | Orange | 11,027 | 73.34% | 4,009 | 26.66% | 7,018 | 46.67% | 15,036 | 25.93% |
| Dana Point | Orange | 10,085 | 74.53% | 3,447 | 25.47% | 6,638 | 49.05% | 13,532 | 18.23% |
| Fountain Valley | Orange | 15,274 | 75.95% | 4,837 | 24.05% | 10,437 | 51.90% | 20,111 | 25.06% |
| Fullerton | Orange | 24,707 | 71.42% | 9,886 | 28.58% | 14,821 | 42.84% | 34,593 | 18.09% |
| Garden Grove | Orange | 24,256 | 69.95% | 10,421 | 30.05% | 13,835 | 39.90% | 34,677 | 38.46% |
| Huntington Beach | Orange | 51,998 | 75.16% | 17,184 | 24.84% | 34,814 | 50.32% | 69,182 | 23.94% |
| Irvine | Orange | 32,271 | 67.72% | 15,385 | 32.28% | 16,886 | 35.43% | 47,656 | 20.56% |
| La Habra | Orange | 9,768 | 72.61% | 3,685 | 27.39% | 6,083 | 45.22% | 13,453 | 23.91% |
| La Palma | Orange | 3,307 | 71.39% | 1,325 | 28.61% | 1,982 | 42.79% | 4,632 | 27.47% |
| Laguna Beach | Orange | 6,260 | 57.19% | 4,686 | 42.81% | 1,574 | 14.38% | 10,946 | 13.53% |
| Laguna Hills | Orange | 8,286 | 77.31% | 2,432 | 22.69% | 5,854 | 54.62% | 10,718 | 21.69% |
| Laguna Niguel | Orange | 18,094 | 76.87% | 5,445 | 23.13% | 12,649 | 53.74% | 23,539 | 22.59% |
| Laguna Woods | Orange | 6,067 | 53.14% | 5,351 | 46.86% | 716 | 6.27% | 11,418 | 11.12% |
| Lake Forest | Orange | 19,517 | 79.57% | 5,010 | 20.43% | 14,507 | 59.15% | 24,527 | 23.99% |
| Los Alamitos | Orange | 2,652 | 71.39% | 1,063 | 28.61% | 1,589 | 42.77% | 3,715 | 25.05% |
| Mission Viejo | Orange | 28,677 | 77.66% | 8,250 | 22.34% | 20,427 | 55.32% | 36,927 | 20.13% |
| Newport Beach | Orange | 27,203 | 77.25% | 8,011 | 22.75% | 19,192 | 54.50% | 35,214 | 9.46% |
| Orange | Orange | 28,821 | 76.60% | 8,804 | 23.40% | 20,017 | 53.20% | 37,625 | 20.85% |
| Placentia | Orange | 11,414 | 76.08% | 3,589 | 23.92% | 7,825 | 52.16% | 15,003 | 21.50% |
| Rancho Santa Margarita | Orange | 12,679 | 82.63% | 2,665 | 17.37% | 10,014 | 65.26% | 15,344 | 25.27% |
| San Clemente | Orange | 16,393 | 77.84% | 4,667 | 22.16% | 11,726 | 55.68% | 21,060 | 17.27% |
| San Juan Capistrano | Orange | 8,797 | 76.66% | 2,679 | 23.34% | 6,118 | 53.31% | 11,476 | 17.53% |
| Santa Ana | Orange | 21,853 | 57.48% | 16,168 | 42.52% | 5,685 | 14.95% | 38,021 | 28.86% |
| Seal Beach | Orange | 8,087 | 65.10% | 4,336 | 34.90% | 3,751 | 30.19% | 12,423 | 16.91% |
| Stanton | Orange | 3,956 | 67.67% | 1,890 | 32.33% | 2,066 | 35.34% | 5,846 | 38.59% |
| Tustin | Orange | 11,740 | 74.23% | 4,076 | 25.77% | 7,664 | 48.46% | 15,816 | 22.47% |
| Villa Park | Orange | 2,620 | 85.20% | 455 | 14.80% | 2,165 | 70.41% | 3,075 | 7.82% |
| Westminster | Orange | 15,008 | 70.77% | 6,199 | 29.23% | 8,809 | 41.54% | 21,207 | 37.25% |
| Yorba Linda | Orange | 20,382 | 82.67% | 4,273 | 17.33% | 16,109 | 65.34% | 24,655 | 19.72% |
| Unincorporated Area | Orange | 31,210 | 78.07% | 8,765 | 21.93% | 22,445 | 56.15% | 39,975 | 19.14% |
| Auburn | Placer | 3,849 | 65.79% | 2,001 | 34.21% | 1,848 | 31.59% | 5,850 | 10.46% |
| Colfax | Placer | 401 | 66.94% | 198 | 33.06% | 203 | 33.89% | 599 | 15.07% |
| Lincoln | Placer | 6,578 | 70.88% | 2,702 | 29.12% | 3,876 | 41.77% | 9,280 | 12.24% |
| Loomis | Placer | 2,115 | 75.81% | 675 | 24.19% | 1,440 | 51.61% | 2,790 | 13.79% |
| Rocklin | Placer | 14,122 | 74.99% | 4,710 | 25.01% | 9,412 | 49.98% | 18,832 | 13.66% |
| Roseville | Placer | 27,354 | 71.98% | 10,647 | 28.02% | 16,707 | 43.96% | 38,001 | 15.10% |
| Unincorporated Area | Placer | 33,621 | 71.82% | 13,195 | 28.18% | 20,426 | 43.63% | 46,816 | 10.80% |
| Portola | Plumas | 401 | 62.85% | 237 | 37.15% | 164 | 25.71% | 638 | 26.07% |
| Unincorporated Area | Plumas | 5,648 | 68.99% | 2,539 | 31.01% | 3,109 | 37.97% | 8,187 | 14.48% |
| Banning | Riverside | 5,344 | 65.31% | 2,839 | 34.69% | 2,505 | 30.61% | 8,183 | 24.77% |
| Beaumont | Riverside | 2,074 | 72.34% | 793 | 27.66% | 1,281 | 44.68% | 2,867 | 37.57% |
| Blythe | Riverside | 1,352 | 64.14% | 756 | 35.86% | 596 | 28.27% | 2,108 | 43.95% |
| Calimesa | Riverside | 1,946 | 72.42% | 741 | 27.58% | 1,205 | 44.85% | 2,687 | 26.04% |
| Canyon Lake | Riverside | 3,401 | 82.53% | 720 | 17.47% | 2,681 | 65.06% | 4,121 | 20.13% |
| Cathedral City | Riverside | 5,424 | 62.26% | 3,288 | 37.74% | 2,136 | 24.52% | 8,712 | 33.77% |
| Coachella | Riverside | 877 | 48.51% | 931 | 51.49% | −54 | −2.99% | 1,808 | 60.09% |
| Corona | Riverside | 23,067 | 75.00% | 7,690 | 25.00% | 15,377 | 50.00% | 30,757 | 28.32% |
| Desert Hot Springs | Riverside | 1,908 | 67.88% | 903 | 32.12% | 1,005 | 35.75% | 2,811 | 36.05% |
| Hemet | Riverside | 12,007 | 68.49% | 5,525 | 31.51% | 6,482 | 36.97% | 17,532 | 25.38% |
| Indian Wells | Riverside | 1,659 | 80.85% | 393 | 19.15% | 1,266 | 61.70% | 2,052 | 5.90% |
| Indio | Riverside | 4,186 | 61.48% | 2,623 | 38.52% | 1,563 | 22.95% | 6,809 | 41.93% |
| La Quinta | Riverside | 6,382 | 76.17% | 1,997 | 23.83% | 4,385 | 52.33% | 8,379 | 23.57% |
| Lake Elsinore | Riverside | 5,048 | 75.84% | 1,608 | 24.16% | 3,440 | 51.68% | 6,656 | 34.34% |
| Moreno Valley | Riverside | 17,891 | 64.02% | 10,053 | 35.98% | 7,838 | 28.05% | 27,944 | 34.86% |
| Murrieta | Riverside | 16,924 | 80.15% | 4,192 | 19.85% | 12,732 | 60.30% | 21,116 | 24.49% |
| Norco | Riverside | 5,576 | 81.08% | 1,301 | 18.92% | 4,275 | 62.16% | 6,877 | 31.22% |
| Palm Desert | Riverside | 10,065 | 71.22% | 4,067 | 28.78% | 5,998 | 42.44% | 14,132 | 16.07% |
| Palm Springs | Riverside | 6,945 | 51.44% | 6,555 | 48.56% | 390 | 2.89% | 13,500 | 20.48% |
| Perris | Riverside | 2,826 | 58.56% | 2,000 | 41.44% | 826 | 17.12% | 4,826 | 36.21% |
| Rancho Mirage | Riverside | 4,000 | 66.66% | 2,001 | 33.34% | 1,999 | 33.31% | 6,001 | 10.64% |
| Riverside | Riverside | 39,973 | 65.09% | 21,436 | 34.91% | 18,537 | 30.19% | 61,409 | 27.13% |
| San Jacinto | Riverside | 4,019 | 69.90% | 1,731 | 30.10% | 2,288 | 39.79% | 5,750 | 29.01% |
| Temecula | Riverside | 16,491 | 81.03% | 3,860 | 18.97% | 12,631 | 62.07% | 20,351 | 24.63% |
| Unincorporated Area | Riverside | 84,538 | 72.87% | 31,482 | 27.13% | 53,056 | 45.73% | 116,020 | 27.98% |
| Citrus Heights | Sacramento | 18,691 | 69.55% | 8,184 | 30.45% | 10,507 | 39.10% | 26,875 | 15.98% |
| Elk Grove | Sacramento | 18,797 | 64.29% | 10,443 | 35.71% | 8,354 | 28.57% | 29,240 | 15.66% |
| Folsom | Sacramento | 15,115 | 72.48% | 5,740 | 27.52% | 9,375 | 44.95% | 20,855 | 11.52% |
| Galt | Sacramento | 3,690 | 68.61% | 1,688 | 31.39% | 2,002 | 37.23% | 5,378 | 24.82% |
| Isleton | Sacramento | 125 | 50.61% | 122 | 49.39% | 3 | 1.21% | 247 | 34.40% |
| Rancho Cordova | Sacramento | 8,875 | 62.82% | 5,253 | 37.18% | 3,622 | 25.64% | 14,128 | N/A (Note: City was not incorporated until after the 2002 election.) |
| Sacramento | Sacramento | 51,686 | 46.23% | 60,123 | 53.77% | −8,437 | −7.55% | 111,809 | 11.98% |
| Unincorporated Area | Sacramento | 109,588 | 63.90% | 61,922 | 36.10% | 47,666 | 27.79% | 171,510 | 13.69% |
| Hollister | San Benito | 3,955 | 50.82% | 3,828 | 49.18% | 127 | 1.63% | 7,783 | 23.83% |
| San Juan Bautista | San Benito | 208 | 39.92% | 313 | 60.08% | −105 | −20.15% | 521 | 8.93% |
| Unincorporated Area | San Benito | 3,815 | 61.53% | 2,385 | 38.47% | 1,430 | 23.06% | 6,200 | 9.90% |
| Adelanto | San Bernardino | 1,778 | 73.62% | 637 | 26.38% | 1,141 | 47.25% | 2,415 | 40.05% |
| Apple Valley | San Bernardino | 13,496 | 81.04% | 3,157 | 18.96% | 10,339 | 62.08% | 16,653 | 21.93% |
| Barstow | San Bernardino | 2,799 | 70.77% | 1,156 | 29.23% | 1,643 | 41.54% | 3,955 | 42.66% |
| Big Bear Lake | San Bernardino | 1,748 | 80.48% | 424 | 19.52% | 1,324 | 60.96% | 2,172 | 22.95% |
| Chino | San Bernardino | 9,699 | 70.17% | 4,123 | 29.83% | 5,576 | 40.34% | 13,822 | 30.27% |
| Chino Hills | San Bernardino | 13,452 | 73.78% | 4,781 | 26.22% | 8,671 | 47.56% | 18,233 | 26.85% |
| Colton | San Bernardino | 4,060 | 55.02% | 3,319 | 44.98% | 741 | 10.04% | 7,379 | 47.06% |
| Fontana | San Bernardino | 12,541 | 60.94% | 8,039 | 39.06% | 4,502 | 21.88% | 20,580 | 39.44% |
| Grand Terrace | San Bernardino | 2,335 | 68.78% | 1,060 | 31.22% | 1,275 | 37.56% | 3,395 | 26.44% |
| Hesperia | San Bernardino | 12,613 | 81.12% | 2,936 | 18.88% | 9,677 | 62.24% | 15,549 | 31.83% |
| Highland | San Bernardino | 7,284 | 68.33% | 3,376 | 31.67% | 3,908 | 36.66% | 10,660 | 34.31% |
| Loma Linda | San Bernardino | 3,049 | 68.36% | 1,411 | 31.64% | 1,638 | 36.73% | 4,460 | 24.84% |
| Montclair | San Bernardino | 3,099 | 58.86% | 2,166 | 41.14% | 933 | 17.72% | 5,265 | 33.13% |
| Needles | San Bernardino | 597 | 62.25% | 362 | 37.75% | 235 | 24.50% | 959 | 30.34% |
| Ontario | San Bernardino | 15,778 | 63.83% | 8,939 | 36.17% | 6,839 | 27.67% | 24,717 | 33.56% |
| Rancho Cucamonga | San Bernardino | 27,593 | 74.53% | 9,429 | 25.47% | 18,164 | 49.06% | 37,022 | 30.16% |
| Redlands | San Bernardino | 14,023 | 67.38% | 6,789 | 32.62% | 7,234 | 34.76% | 20,812 | 22.16% |
| Rialto | San Bernardino | 7,961 | 55.81% | 6,304 | 44.19% | 1,657 | 11.62% | 14,265 | 42.61% |
| San Bernardino | San Bernardino | 17,374 | 59.44% | 11,855 | 40.56% | 5,519 | 18.88% | 29,229 | 38.41% |
| Twentynine Palms | San Bernardino | 1,969 | 76.58% | 602 | 23.42% | 1,367 | 53.17% | 2,571 | 35.48% |
| Upland | San Bernardino | 14,401 | 72.50% | 5,463 | 27.50% | 8,938 | 45.00% | 19,864 | 23.97% |
| Victorville | San Bernardino | 10,296 | 74.68% | 3,490 | 25.32% | 6,806 | 49.37% | 13,786 | 34.44% |
| Yucaipa | San Bernardino | 10,235 | 76.15% | 3,206 | 23.85% | 7,029 | 52.30% | 13,441 | 30.90% |
| Yucca Valley | San Bernardino | 3,655 | 74.56% | 1,247 | 25.44% | 2,408 | 49.12% | 4,902 | 24.92% |
| Unincorporated Area | San Bernardino | 47,884 | 74.09% | 16,743 | 25.91% | 31,141 | 48.19% | 64,627 | 27.71% |
| Carlsbad | San Diego | 24,860 | 70.01% | 10,650 | 29.99% | 14,210 | 40.02% | 35,510 | 17.62% |
| Chula Vista | San Diego | 28,139 | 63.67% | 16,053 | 36.33% | 12,086 | 27.35% | 44,192 | 28.49% |
| Coronado | San Diego | 4,813 | 69.53% | 2,109 | 30.47% | 2,704 | 39.06% | 6,922 | 2.87% |
| Del Mar | San Diego | 1,137 | 53.38% | 993 | 46.62% | 144 | 6.76% | 2,130 | 8.77% |
| El Cajon | San Diego | 15,954 | 73.54% | 5,741 | 26.46% | 10,213 | 47.08% | 21,695 | 24.85% |
| Encinitas | San Diego | 14,017 | 60.25% | 9,249 | 39.75% | 4,768 | 20.49% | 23,266 | 16.70% |
| Escondido | San Diego | 23,436 | 75.51% | 7,600 | 24.49% | 15,836 | 51.02% | 31,036 | 20.32% |
| Imperial Beach | San Diego | 3,288 | 67.20% | 1,605 | 32.80% | 1,683 | 34.40% | 4,893 | 33.47% |
| La Mesa | San Diego | 11,710 | 63.70% | 6,674 | 36.30% | 5,036 | 27.39% | 18,384 | 20.71% |
| Lemon Grove | San Diego | 4,150 | 64.27% | 2,307 | 35.73% | 1,843 | 28.54% | 6,457 | 27.04% |
| National City | San Diego | 4,032 | 54.67% | 3,343 | 45.33% | 689 | 9.34% | 7,375 | 41.13% |
| Oceanside | San Diego | 31,236 | 70.23% | 13,241 | 29.77% | 17,995 | 40.46% | 44,477 | 22.21% |
| Poway | San Diego | 13,842 | 75.78% | 4,424 | 24.22% | 9,418 | 51.56% | 18,266 | 18.74% |
| San Diego | San Diego | 195,818 | 58.04% | 141,540 | 41.96% | 54,278 | 16.09% | 337,358 | 19.84% |
| San Marcos | San Diego | 13,024 | 74.86% | 4,373 | 25.14% | 8,651 | 49.73% | 17,397 | 23.75% |
| Santee | San Diego | 13,437 | 76.40% | 4,151 | 23.60% | 9,286 | 52.80% | 17,588 | 28.72% |
| Solana Beach | San Diego | 3,346 | 60.97% | 2,142 | 39.03% | 1,204 | 21.94% | 5,488 | 10.18% |
| Vista | San Diego | 15,057 | 74.63% | 5,118 | 25.37% | 9,939 | 49.26% | 20,175 | 23.17% |
| Unincorporated Area | San Diego | 108,973 | 76.31% | 33,838 | 23.69% | 75,135 | 52.61% | 142,811 | 17.43% |
| San Francisco | San Francisco | 52,177 | 19.69% | 212,763 | 80.31% | −160,586 | −60.61% | 264,940 | −9.77% |
| Escalon | San Joaquin | 1,411 | 67.87% | 668 | 32.13% | 743 | 35.74% | 2,079 | 20.54% |
| Lathrop | San Joaquin | 1,217 | 58.71% | 856 | 41.29% | 361 | 17.41% | 2,073 | 32.03% |
| Lodi | San Joaquin | 12,278 | 71.65% | 4,858 | 28.35% | 7,420 | 43.30% | 17,136 | 17.31% |
| Manteca | San Joaquin | 8,393 | 64.34% | 4,651 | 35.66% | 3,742 | 28.69% | 13,044 | 24.91% |
| Ripon | San Joaquin | 2,938 | 74.74% | 993 | 25.26% | 1,945 | 49.48% | 3,931 | 10.55% |
| Stockton | San Joaquin | 26,288 | 52.47% | 23,817 | 47.53% | 2,471 | 4.93% | 50,105 | 19.13% |
| Tracy | San Joaquin | 9,063 | 60.78% | 5,847 | 39.22% | 3,216 | 21.57% | 14,910 | 22.16% |
| Unincorporated Area | San Joaquin | 23,148 | 67.54% | 11,126 | 32.46% | 12,022 | 35.08% | 34,274 | 17.64% |
| Unapportioned absentees | San Joaquin | 417 | 43.99% | 531 | 56.01% | −114 | −12.03% | 948 | N/A |
| Arroyo Grande | San Luis Obispo | 4,583 | 64.47% | 2,526 | 35.53% | 2,057 | 28.94% | 7,109 | 9.01% |
| Atascadero | San Luis Obispo | 6,765 | 68.53% | 3,106 | 31.47% | 3,659 | 37.07% | 9,871 | 11.43% |
| El Paso de Robles | San Luis Obispo | 5,794 | 71.81% | 2,274 | 28.19% | 3,520 | 43.63% | 8,068 | 13.76% |
| Grover Beach | San Luis Obispo | 2,419 | 64.10% | 1,355 | 35.90% | 1,064 | 28.19% | 3,774 | 22.95% |
| Morro Bay | San Luis Obispo | 2,542 | 55.55% | 2,034 | 44.45% | 508 | 11.10% | 4,576 | 10.58% |
| Pismo Beach | San Luis Obispo | 2,468 | 64.30% | 1,370 | 35.70% | 1,098 | 28.61% | 3,838 | 10.41% |
| San Luis Obispo | San Luis Obispo | 7,307 | 49.91% | 7,332 | 50.09% | −25 | −0.17% | 14,639 | 3.43% |
| Unincorporated Area | San Luis Obispo | 24,063 | 65.08% | 12,909 | 34.92% | 11,154 | 30.17% | 36,972 | 7.81% |
| Unapportioned absentees | San Luis Obispo | 2,727 | 68.72% | 1,241 | 31.28% | 1,486 | 37.45% | 3,968 | 15.09% |
| Atherton | San Mateo | 2,036 | 57.68% | 1,494 | 42.32% | 542 | 15.35% | 3,530 | −5.93% |
| Belmont | San Mateo | 3,675 | 37.91% | 6,020 | 62.09% | −2,345 | −24.19% | 9,695 | 2.66% |
| Brisbane | San Mateo | 445 | 29.22% | 1,078 | 70.78% | −633 | −41.56% | 1,523 | 0.23% |
| Burlingame | San Mateo | 4,070 | 39.43% | 6,251 | 60.57% | −2,181 | −21.13% | 10,321 | −2.44% |
| Colma | San Mateo | 78 | 28.36% | 197 | 71.64% | −119 | −43.27% | 275 | 7.34% |
| Daly City | San Mateo | 5,988 | 30.93% | 13,370 | 69.07% | −7,382 | −38.13% | 19,358 | 10.26% |
| East Palo Alto | San Mateo | 600 | 17.80% | 2,770 | 82.20% | −2,170 | −64.39% | 3,370 | 1.44% |
| Foster City | San Mateo | 4,041 | 41.81% | 5,624 | 58.19% | −1,583 | −16.38% | 9,665 | 8.18% |
| Half Moon Bay | San Mateo | 1,859 | 42.79% | 2,485 | 57.21% | −626 | −14.41% | 4,344 | −0.31% |
| Hillsborough | San Mateo | 2,876 | 57.97% | 2,085 | 42.03% | 791 | 15.94% | 4,961 | −2.10% |
| Menlo Park | San Mateo | 3,819 | 33.26% | 7,664 | 66.74% | −3,845 | −33.48% | 11,483 | −7.31% |
| Millbrae | San Mateo | 2,829 | 40.55% | 4,147 | 59.45% | −1,318 | −18.89% | 6,976 | 0.65% |
| Pacifica | San Mateo | 4,519 | 32.52% | 9,377 | 67.48% | −4,858 | −34.96% | 13,896 | 2.49% |
| Portola Valley | San Mateo | 1,086 | 43.01% | 1,439 | 56.99% | −353 | −13.98% | 2,525 | −4.95% |
| Redwood City | San Mateo | 8,600 | 38.98% | 13,463 | 61.02% | −4,863 | −22.04% | 22,063 | 3.68% |
| San Bruno | San Mateo | 4,029 | 36.06% | 7,143 | 63.94% | −3,114 | −27.87% | 11,172 | 7.14% |
| San Carlos | San Mateo | 4,610 | 38.98% | 7,217 | 61.02% | −2,607 | −22.04% | 11,827 | −1.19% |
| San Mateo | San Mateo | 10,893 | 37.25% | 18,347 | 62.75% | −7,454 | −25.49% | 29,240 | 2.25% |
| South San Francisco | San Mateo | 4,883 | 33.36% | 9,755 | 66.64% | −4,872 | −33.28% | 14,638 | 9.48% |
| Woodside | San Mateo | 1,391 | 50.82% | 1,346 | 49.18% | 45 | 1.64% | 2,737 | −3.28% |
| Unincorporated Area | San Mateo | 7,782 | 35.83% | 13,938 | 64.17% | −6,156 | −28.34% | 21,720 | −1.48% |
| Buellton | Santa Barbara | 1,075 | 69.76% | 466 | 30.24% | 609 | 39.52% | 1,541 | 24.72% |
| Carpinteria | Santa Barbara | 2,256 | 52.71% | 2,024 | 47.29% | 232 | 5.42% | 4,280 | 17.10% |
| Goleta | Santa Barbara | 5,537 | 52.13% | 5,084 | 47.87% | 453 | 4.27% | 10,621 | 9.77% |
| Guadalupe | Santa Barbara | 530 | 55.79% | 420 | 44.21% | 110 | 11.58% | 950 | 44.48% |
| Lompoc | Santa Barbara | 6,023 | 66.61% | 3,019 | 33.39% | 3,004 | 33.22% | 9,042 | 27.09% |
| Santa Barbara | Santa Barbara | 12,655 | 42.55% | 17,084 | 57.45% | −4,429 | −14.89% | 29,739 | 6.43% |
| Santa Maria | Santa Barbara | 10,502 | 68.70% | 4,784 | 31.30% | 5,718 | 37.41% | 15,286 | 22.80% |
| Solvang | Santa Barbara | 1,539 | 69.01% | 691 | 30.99% | 848 | 38.03% | 2,230 | 9.98% |
| Unincorporated Area | Santa Barbara | 31,441 | 61.56% | 19,632 | 38.44% | 11,809 | 23.12% | 51,073 | 10.91% |
| Campbell | Santa Clara | 4,970 | 44.95% | 6,087 | 55.05% | −1,117 | −10.10% | 11,057 | 9.22% |
| Cupertino | Santa Clara | 6,610 | 42.43% | 8,970 | 57.57% | −2,360 | −15.15% | 15,580 | 6.48% |
| Gilroy | Santa Clara | 4,281 | 46.84% | 4,859 | 53.16% | −578 | −6.32% | 9,140 | 15.48% |
| Los Altos | Santa Clara | 5,621 | 42.16% | 7,710 | 57.84% | −2,089 | −15.67% | 13,331 | −3.45% |
| Los Altos Hills | Santa Clara | 1,923 | 50.81% | 1,862 | 49.19% | 61 | 1.61% | 3,785 | −2.04% |
| Los Gatos | Santa Clara | 5,568 | 47.02% | 6,274 | 52.98% | −706 | −5.96% | 11,842 | 1.99% |
| Milpitas | Santa Clara | 5,402 | 45.38% | 6,503 | 54.62% | −1,101 | −9.25% | 11,905 | 20.97% |
| Monte Sereno | Santa Clara | 896 | 54.30% | 754 | 45.70% | 142 | 8.61% | 1,650 | 2.39% |
| Morgan Hill | Santa Clara | 5,114 | 53.05% | 4,526 | 46.95% | 588 | 6.10% | 9,640 | 9.00% |
| Mountain View | Santa Clara | 6,692 | 32.66% | 13,797 | 67.34% | −7,105 | −34.68% | 20,489 | −0.82% |
| Palo Alto | Santa Clara | 6,381 | 25.45% | 18,687 | 74.55% | −12,306 | −49.09% | 25,068 | −4.94% |
| San Jose | Santa Clara | 86,028 | 43.09% | 113,614 | 56.91% | −27,586 | −13.82% | 199,642 | 10.48% |
| Santa Clara | Santa Clara | 9,887 | 40.18% | 14,719 | 59.82% | −4,832 | −19.64% | 24,606 | 6.91% |
| Saratoga | Santa Clara | 6,753 | 52.52% | 6,104 | 47.48% | 649 | 5.05% | 12,857 | 3.59% |
| Sunnyvale | Santa Clara | 13,252 | 39.77% | 20,070 | 60.23% | −6,818 | −20.46% | 33,322 | 5.21% |
| Unincorporated Area | Santa Clara | 12,954 | 44.67% | 16,043 | 55.33% | −3,089 | −10.65% | 28,997 | 3.46% |
| Capitola | Santa Cruz | 1,417 | 37.16% | 2,396 | 62.84% | −979 | −25.68% | 3,813 | 7.31% |
| Santa Cruz | Santa Cruz | 5,562 | 23.51% | 18,099 | 76.49% | −12,537 | −52.99% | 23,661 | −9.36% |
| Scotts Valley | Santa Cruz | 2,376 | 49.95% | 2,381 | 50.05% | −5 | −0.11% | 4,757 | 5.88% |
| Watsonville | Santa Cruz | 2,742 | 38.58% | 4,366 | 61.42% | −1,624 | −22.85% | 7,108 | 13.60% |
| Unincorporated Area | Santa Cruz | 20,842 | 39.18% | 32,360 | 60.82% | −11,518 | −21.65% | 53,202 | 2.21% |
| Anderson | Shasta | 1,330 | 69.49% | 584 | 30.51% | 746 | 38.98% | 1,914 | 28.68% |
| Redding | Shasta | 19,284 | 70.27% | 8,159 | 29.73% | 11,125 | 40.54% | 27,443 | 15.32% |
| Shasta Lake | Shasta | 1,781 | 70.20% | 756 | 29.80% | 1,025 | 40.40% | 2,537 | 30.68% |
| Unincorporated Area | Shasta | 18,479 | 74.47% | 6,334 | 25.53% | 12,145 | 48.95% | 24,813 | 15.70% |
| Loyalton | Sierra | 201 | 70.03% | 86 | 29.97% | 115 | 40.07% | 287 | 14.94% |
| Unincorporated Area | Sierra | 806 | 68.48% | 371 | 31.52% | 435 | 36.96% | 1177 | 4.47% |
| Dorris | Siskiyou | 168 | 77.42% | 49 | 22.58% | 119 | 54.84% | 217 | 22.80% |
| Dunsmuir | Siskiyou | 343 | 54.36% | 288 | 45.64% | 55 | 8.72% | 631 | 25.36% |
| Etna | Siskiyou | 222 | 76.82% | 67 | 23.18% | 155 | 53.63% | 289 | 8.75% |
| Fort Jones | Siskiyou | 178 | 80.91% | 42 | 19.09% | 136 | 61.82% | 220 | 12.72% |
| Montague | Siskiyou | 311 | 86.39% | 49 | 13.61% | 262 | 72.78% | 360 | 26.21% |
| Mt. Shasta | Siskiyou | 628 | 50.20% | 623 | 49.80% | 5 | 0.40% | 1251 | 6.21% |
| Tulelake | Siskiyou | 123 | 69.89% | 53 | 30.11% | 70 | 39.77% | 176 | 3.91% |
| Weed | Siskiyou | 414 | 55.35% | 334 | 44.65% | 80 | 10.70% | 748 | 34.13% |
| Yreka | Siskiyou | 1,963 | 77.16% | 581 | 22.84% | 1,382 | 54.32% | 2,544 | 19.57% |
| Unincorporated Area | Siskiyou | 7,028 | 73.28% | 2,562 | 26.72% | 4,466 | 46.57% | 9,590 | 12.85% |
| Benicia | Solano | 4,677 | 43.66% | 6,036 | 56.34% | −1,359 | −12.69% | 10,713 | 5.57% |
| Dixon | Solano | 3,044 | 63.55% | 1,746 | 36.45% | 1,298 | 27.10% | 4,790 | 16.00% |
| Fairfield | Solano | 12,008 | 51.31% | 11,396 | 48.69% | 612 | 2.61% | 23,404 | 14.83% |
| Rio Vista | Solano | 1,367 | 60.95% | 876 | 39.05% | 491 | 21.89% | 2,243 | 15.62% |
| Suisun City | Solano | 2,802 | 47.26% | 3,127 | 52.74% | −325 | −5.48% | 5,929 | 20.86% |
| Vacaville | Solano | 14,547 | 59.54% | 9,884 | 40.46% | 4,663 | 19.09% | 24,431 | 18.03% |
| Vallejo | Solano | 9,410 | 33.97% | 18,293 | 66.03% | −8,883 | −32.07% | 27,703 | 9.73% |
| Unincorporated Area | Solano | 4,296 | 65.11% | 2,302 | 34.89% | 1,994 | 30.22% | 6,598 | 7.86% |
| Cloverdale | Sonoma | 1,181 | 45.30% | 1,426 | 54.70% | −245 | −9.40% | 2,607 | 7.41% |
| Cotati | Sonoma | 889 | 36.98% | 1,515 | 63.02% | −626 | −26.04% | 2,404 | 3.73% |
| Healdsburg | Sonoma | 1,678 | 39.44% | 2,577 | 60.56% | −899 | −21.13% | 4,255 | −3.58% |
| Petaluma | Sonoma | 7,766 | 38.50% | 12,404 | 61.50% | −4,638 | −22.99% | 20,170 | 1.44% |
| Rohnert Park | Sonoma | 5,289 | 43.69% | 6,818 | 56.31% | −1,529 | −12.63% | 12,107 | 7.82% |
| Santa Rosa | Sonoma | 20,594 | 39.90% | 31,015 | 60.10% | −10,421 | −20.19% | 51,609 | 0.15% |
| Sebastopol | Sonoma | 925 | 26.75% | 2,533 | 73.25% | −1,608 | −46.50% | 3,458 | −12.40% |
| Sonoma | Sonoma | 1,596 | 35.45% | 2,906 | 64.55% | −1,310 | −29.10% | 4,502 | −5.22% |
| Windsor | Sonoma | 3,920 | 48.84% | 4,107 | 51.16% | −187 | −2.33% | 8,027 | 7.95% |
| Unincorporated Area | Sonoma | 22,413 | 38.31% | 36,095 | 61.69% | −13,682 | −23.38% | 58,508 | −3.89% |
| Ceres | Stanislaus | 2,724 | 62.31% | 1,648 | 37.69% | 1,076 | 24.61% | 4,372 | 35.56% |
| Hughson | Stanislaus | 565 | 69.07% | 253 | 30.93% | 312 | 38.14% | 818 | 32.78% |
| Modesto | Stanislaus | 17,134 | 62.43% | 10,309 | 37.57% | 6,825 | 24.87% | 27,443 | 24.04% |
| Newman | Stanislaus | 627 | 64.84% | 340 | 35.16% | 287 | 29.68% | 967 | 34.70% |
| Oakdale | Stanislaus | 1,766 | 67.30% | 858 | 32.70% | 908 | 34.60% | 2,624 | 17.56% |
| Patterson | Stanislaus | 808 | 55.04% | 660 | 44.96% | 148 | 10.08% | 1,468 | 29.60% |
| Riverbank | Stanislaus | 1,380 | 63.07% | 808 | 36.93% | 572 | 26.14% | 2,188 | 27.32% |
| Turlock | Stanislaus | 5,225 | 66.43% | 2,640 | 33.57% | 2,585 | 32.87% | 7,865 | 22.34% |
| Waterford | Stanislaus | 715 | 71.14% | 290 | 28.86% | 425 | 42.29% | 1,005 | 36.78% |
| Unincorporated Area | Stanislaus | 11,106 | 68.69% | 5,063 | 31.31% | 6,043 | 37.37% | 16,169 | 20.69% |
| Unapportioned absentees | Stanislaus | 24,888 | 59.51% | 16,936 | 40.49% | 7,952 | 19.01% | 41,824 | 17.01% |
| Live Oak | Sutter | 698 | 67.90% | 330 | 32.10% | 368 | 35.80% | 1,028 | 33.20% |
| Yuba City | Sutter | 9,247 | 75.42% | 3,013 | 24.58% | 6,234 | 50.85% | 12,260 | 26.40% |
| Unincorporated Area | Sutter | 8,013 | 80.83% | 1,901 | 19.17% | 6,112 | 61.65% | 9,914 | 17.62% |
| Corning | Tehama | 1,056 | 71.11% | 429 | 28.89% | 627 | 42.22% | 1,485 | 21.66% |
| Red Bluff | Tehama | 2,164 | 66.65% | 1,083 | 33.35% | 1,081 | 33.29% | 3,247 | 19.67% |
| Tehama | Tehama | 121 | 72.89% | 45 | 27.11% | 76 | 45.78% | 166 | 13.74% |
| Unincorporated Area | Tehama | 10,043 | 74.72% | 3,397 | 25.28% | 6,646 | 49.45% | 13,440 | 17.79% |
| Unincorporated Area | Trinity | 3,249 | 63.91% | 1,835 | 36.09% | 1,414 | 27.81% | 5,084 | 15.87% |
| Dinuba | Tulare | 1,613 | 60.07% | 1,072 | 39.93% | 541 | 20.15% | 2,685 | 21.48% |
| Exeter | Tulare | 1,662 | 75.17% | 549 | 24.83% | 1,113 | 50.34% | 2,211 | 18.80% |
| Farmersville | Tulare | 554 | 59.51% | 377 | 40.49% | 177 | 19.01% | 931 | 40.65% |
| Lindsay | Tulare | 602 | 58.28% | 431 | 41.72% | 171 | 16.55% | 1,033 | 35.20% |
| Porterville | Tulare | 4,751 | 68.50% | 2,185 | 31.50% | 2,566 | 37.00% | 6,936 | 23.90% |
| Tulare | Tulare | 5,784 | 70.42% | 2,430 | 29.58% | 3,354 | 40.83% | 8,214 | 20.07% |
| Visalia | Tulare | 19,130 | 73.82% | 6,783 | 26.18% | 12,347 | 47.65% | 25,913 | 15.12% |
| Woodlake | Tulare | 389 | 53.51% | 338 | 46.49% | 51 | 7.02% | 727 | 38.62% |
| Unincorporated Area | Tulare | 19,408 | 74.47% | 6,653 | 25.53% | 12,755 | 48.94% | 26,061 | 18.19% |
| Sonora | Tuolumne | 914 | 57.56% | 674 | 42.44% | 240 | 15.11% | 1,588 | 18.46% |
| Unincorporated Area | Tuolumne | 12,524 | 64.27% | 6,963 | 35.73% | 5,561 | 28.54% | 19,487 | 13.81% |
| Camarillo | Ventura | 15,582 | 65.59% | 8,175 | 34.41% | 7,407 | 31.18% | 23,757 | 18.78% |
| Fillmore | Ventura | 1,967 | 59.46% | 1,341 | 40.54% | 626 | 18.92% | 3,308 | 28.29% |
| Moorpark | Ventura | 7,259 | 70.29% | 3,068 | 29.71% | 4,191 | 40.58% | 10,327 | 26.17% |
| Ojai | Ventura | 1,503 | 50.13% | 1,495 | 49.87% | 8 | 0.27% | 2,998 | 11.04% |
| Oxnard | Ventura | 15,175 | 50.76% | 14,718 | 49.24% | 457 | 1.53% | 29,893 | 25.61% |
| Port Hueneme | Ventura | 2,521 | 56.37% | 1,951 | 43.63% | 570 | 12.75% | 4,472 | 24.58% |
| San Buenaventura | Ventura | 21,281 | 57.63% | 15,646 | 42.37% | 5,635 | 15.26% | 36,927 | 19.77% |
| Santa Paula | Ventura | 3,163 | 52.44% | 2,869 | 47.56% | 294 | 4.87% | 6,032 | 30.45% |
| Simi Valley | Ventura | 28,642 | 75.38% | 9,353 | 24.62% | 19,289 | 50.77% | 37,995 | 29.19% |
| Thousand Oaks | Ventura | 31,586 | 67.21% | 15,412 | 32.79% | 16,174 | 34.41% | 46,998 | 18.71% |
| Unincorporated Area | Ventura | 19,859 | 63.42% | 11,456 | 36.58% | 8,403 | 26.83% | 31,315 | 16.68% |
| Davis | Yolo | 7,714 | 33.76% | 15,137 | 66.24% | −7,423 | −32.48% | 22,851 | −2.57% |
| West Sacramento | Yolo | 5,528 | 56.28% | 4,295 | 43.72% | 1,233 | 12.55% | 9,823 | 25.68% |
| Winters | Yolo | 1,048 | 56.96% | 792 | 43.04% | 256 | 13.91% | 1,840 | 16.60% |
| Woodland | Yolo | 9,329 | 63.75% | 5,305 | 36.25% | 4,024 | 27.50% | 14,634 | 16.84% |
| Unincorporated Area | Yolo | 4,159 | 63.34% | 2,407 | 36.66% | 1,752 | 26.68% | 6,566 | 5.63% |
| Marysville | Yuba | 2,163 | 71.48% | 863 | 28.52% | 1,300 | 42.96% | 3,026 | 21.08% |
| Wheatland | Yuba | 487 | 77.80% | 139 | 22.20% | 348 | 55.59% | 626 | 27.36% |
| Unincorporated Area | Yuba | 8,255 | 76.14% | 2,587 | 23.86% | 5,668 | 52.28% | 10,842 | 20.13% |
| Totals | | 4,976,274 | 55.39% | 4,007,783 | 44.61% | 968,491 | 10.78% | 8,984,057 | 15.65% |

== See also ==
- 1921 North Dakota gubernatorial recall election
- 2012 Wisconsin gubernatorial recall election
- 2021 California gubernatorial recall election
- 2003 United States gubernatorial elections
