= Jill Whelan =

American actress (born 1966)

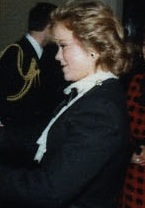
- Whelan in 1984
- Born: September 29, 1966 (age 60); Oakland, California, U.S.
- Education: Guildford College (withdrawn)
- Occupations: Actress, radio talk show host
- Years active: 1973–present
- Known for: Vicki Stubing – The Love Boat
- Spouses: Brad St. John (m. 1993; div. 2001) Michael Chaykowsky (m. 2004; div. 2014) Jeff Knapple (m. 2017)
- Children: 2

Jill Whelan (born September 29, 1966) is an American actress. After working in television commercials, she landed her breakthrough role playing Vicki Stubing, the daughter of Captain Stubing, in six of the nine seasons of the American television series The Love Boat (1977–1986). She later guest starred on the revival Love Boat: The Next Wave. She has had numerous guest roles in TV shows and played Lisa Davis in Airplane! In 2015, she was hired as a celebrations ambassador by Princess Cruises.

== Early life ==
Jill Whelan was born in Oakland, California. After auditioning and appearing in a local production of The King and I at the age of 8, she sent her school picture to a San Francisco Talent Agency and landed a series of TV commercials.

An M&M commercial got her noticed by producers, and she was cast in Friends (1979), which was quickly cancelled. Concurrently, at the age of 11, she was cast as Vicki, daughter of The Love Boat's Captain Stubing. She initially appeared on the show as a guest star, and later became a series regular.

In 1984, Whelan graduated from the Buckley School in Sherman Oaks, California with a stint at Guildford College in Surrey, England where she studied English Literature before coming back to Los Angeles.

== Career ==
As well as starring in The Love Boat, Whelan made numerous guest appearances in TV shows including Fantasy Island (twice), Vegas, Trapper John, M.D., Matt Houston and Battle of the Network Stars. She also made guest appearances on game shows including Family Feud, Body Language and Super Password. In the 1980 disaster comedy film Airplane!, Whelan played the role of Lisa Davis, a heart transplant patient.

In the mid-1980s, in Los Angeles, having returned from England and with The Love Boat coming to an end, Whelan moved to New York City and worked as an event producer at Madison Square Garden, where she helped set up acts.

In 1999, Whelan left acting, started working as an investigative producer at the Los Angeles television station KCOP-TV, and later became a radio show host for Talk Radio 1210 WPHT in Philadelphia.

On November 25, 2001, Whelan appeared on an episode of The Weakest Link, a trivia game show hosted by Anne Robinson. Whelan competed against other celebrity 1970s TV stars, including Mackenzie Phillips, Nell Carter, Cindy Williams, Joan Van Ark, Erin Moran, Erik Estrada, and Fred Rerun Berry. She outlasted the others, winning $57,000 for her charity.

On September 10, 2008, Whelan appeared with several other cast members from the movie Airplane! in a reunion segment on NBC's Today Show. In October 2008, she made her New York City cabaret debut with her one-woman show Jill Whelan: An Evening in Dry Dock at the Metropolitan Room. From September to November 2011, Whelan appeared in the British farce Move Over Mrs. Markham at Stage West Theatre Restaurant in the Toronto, Ontario area.

Whelan was set to replace Mark Thompson, who retired on August 17, 2012, after 25 years co-hosting The Mark & Brian Show on KLOS in Los Angeles, but during Thompson's final broadcast, co-host Brian Phelps announced that he, too, was quitting KLOS.

In 2013, Whelan became co-host with Brian Phelps of The Brian and Jill Show. The two share a love for improvisational comedy, and have created hundreds of characters together that they have performed on stage during improvisation shows and in sketches on their podcast.

Whelan is mentioned in "Dead Man Sliding", the tenth episode of the third season of Sliders, as an actress who never had relevance in the dimension of the protagonists.

== Personal life ==
During the early 1980s, Whelan served as a national spokeswoman for First Lady Nancy Reagan's "Just Say No" anti-drug campaign.

Whelan met her first husband, Brad St. John, as an associate producer for KCOP-TV in Los Angeles, shortly after leaving Madison Square Garden. They married in December 1993. Soon after their wedding, she became pregnant with her first son, Harrison. Whelan divorced St. John in 2001.

Returning to the East Coast, she married her second husband, Michael Chaykowsky, in April 2004. Her second son, Grant, was born in 2006. In 2014, Whelan filed for divorce from Chaykowsky.

In 2015, Whelan was hired by Princess Cruises as a celebrations ambassador.

Whelan married former Denver Broncos quarterback Jeff Knapple in 2017.
