= KSBR =

Jazz music radio station at Saddleback Community College in Mission Viejo, California

Coordinates: 33.503°N 117.603°W

Simulcasts KCSN, Northridge
- Mission Viejo, California; United States
- Broadcast area: Orange County, California
- Frequency: 88.5 MHz (HD Radio)
- Branding: 88.5 The SoCal Sound

Programming
- Format: Adult alternative (Public)
- Subchannels: HD2: Latin alternative ("Bilingual Sounds")

Ownership
- Owner: Saddleback Community College
- Operator: California State University Northridge (main/HD2 feeds)

History
- First air date: 1975
- Call sign meaning: Saddleback College Radio

Technical information
- Licensing authority: FCC
- Facility ID: 58529
- Class: B1
- ERP: 1,800 watts
- HAAT: 198 meters (650 ft)
- Translators: 89.1 K206AA (Laguna Beach); 89.5 K208AM (Newport Beach)

Links
- Public license information: Public file; LMS
- Webcast: Listen live; HD2: Listen live
- Website: www.thesocalsound.org; HD2: www.bilingualsounds.org

KSBR (88.5 FM, "88.5 The SoCal Sound") is a non-commercial educational radio station licensed to Mission Viejo, California, and broadcasting to the Orange County area. The station, owned by Saddleback College, airs adult album alternative (AAA) and Americana music with a mix of legends, new music, and local music, as well as specialty programming on weekends. KSBR is simulcast with KCSN in Northridge, California.

== History ==
KSBR signed on in 1975 as a Class D, 10-watt student-run station and a limited coverage area of only a few miles from the campus of Saddleback Community College. In 1979, with grants from CPB and NTIA, the signal was upgraded to a Class A, covering most of Orange County and the station signed on as Orange County's first National Public Radio affiliate with a staff of professional and student broadcasters. The program schedule at first employed an eclectic, free-form mix of rock music, drama and locally produced talk shows but, with a growing news and public affairs emphasis and a switch to an all jazz format, the station gained critical recognition and a growing audience.

Budget cuts in 1984 returned KSBR to a student-run operation, most of the professional staff was laid off and the NPR membership was discontinued but the strong emphasis on jazz and public affairs continued.

Since 1989, the station has hosted a fundraiser in May which they call the Birthday Bash. It draws top Jazz talent and has been held at various venues in Orange County over the years.

For years, the station had a What's-playing-now page on the web. That contained a list of the previous 6 CDs played (promos were counted as items, as were songs). As of December 2016, that service has been eliminated.

The call letters were previously used by an FM station in San Bruno, California, which operated at 100.5 MHz, from 1947 to 1959. The station was owned and operated by Eitel-McCullough, which moved to San Carlos, California in 1959 and merged with Varian Associates in 1965.

=== "The New 88.5 FM" ===
On September 6, 2017, Saddleback College and California State University, Northridge, owner of KCSN, announced the merger of their respective radio stations. The combined operation adopted the branding "The New 88.5 FM". On September 12 at 10 a.m. PDT, the FM and HD1 signals of both stations began simulcasting KCSN’s pre-existing "smart rock" AAA format, while KSBR’s jazz programming would move to their HD2 channels. KCSN’s Latin Alternative relocated to both stations’ HD3 channels.

On March 21, 2018, 88.5 FM announced that former KSWD (100.3 The Sound) radio personality Andy Chanley would host afternoon drive, taking over for Sky Daniels who continued as General Manager and Program Director. Prior to this, Chanley had guest hosted in Daniels’ place for several weeks since January.

On August 18, 2022, it was announced that KSBR would change its branding to "88.5 The SoCal Sound" on August 19.

On November 16, 2016, KSBR will change call letters to KOCV ("Orange County Vibe").

== Weekend programming ==
On weekends, the current schedule breaks from jazz/smooth jazz and airs programs such as The Whole 'Nuther Thing (free form eclectic), Kaleidoscope of Blues, Reggae Showcase, Folk Roots, bluegrass, old-timey, Celtic, The '80s Experience, and Making Your Memories (doo-wop and other music of the late 1950s/early 1960s). The Morning Breeze presents gentle, relaxing music (e.g. Enya) on weekend mornings.

== See also ==
- Campus radio
- List of college radio stations in the United States
