= Frank Sontag =

Frank M. Sontag
- Born: 1955; Cleveland, Ohio
- Occupation(s): Christian Radio Host; Motivational speaker
- Spouse: Erin

Frank M. Sontag is an American radio personality having hosted programs for over a couple decades. In 2009, he began hosting an internet talk radio show. Sontag was a regular cast member on the Mark & Brian radio program. He also has had small acting parts in a few motion pictures.

== Radio Host ==
=== FM 95.5 KLOS, Impact ===
Sontag hosted the Impact program on 95.5 KLOS-FM for more than twenty years, a talk radio show that discussed a wide variety of topics.

=== FM 99.5 KKLA, the Frank Sontag show ===
KKLA is a Christian talk and teaching radio station based in Los Angeles, California, first aired in 1985.

In 2013, Sontag joined KKLA-FM 99.5 FM on the program The Frank Sontag show: Intersection of Faith and Reason, a Christian talk and discussion forum. He succeeded Frank Pastore of The Frank Pastore Show following Pastore's death in 2012.

Sontag announced his departure from KKLA with a final episode posted on July 28, 2021.

== Personal ==
On March 7, 2010, a few months after leaving KLOS Radio, Sontag expressed a conversion to Christianity This affected his radio programming choices.

As of 2004, Sontag was married to Erin with one daughter and one son.

== Book ==
Sontag's book is autobiographical, Light the Way Home: My Incredible Ride from New Age to New Life.
