= KCSN =

Public radio station at California State University, Northridge

- Northridge, Los Angeles, California; United States
- Broadcast area: Greater Los Angeles area
- Frequency: 88.5 MHz (HD Radio)
- Branding: 88.5 The SoCal Sound

Programming
- Format: Adult album alternative (Public)
- Subchannels: HD2: Latin alternative "Bilingual Sounds"

Ownership
- Owner: California State University, Northridge

History
- First air date: November 1963
- Former call signs: KEDC-FM (1963–1973)
- Call sign meaning: California State/Northridge

Technical information
- Licensing authority: FCC
- Facility ID: 62949
- Class: B1
- ERP: 370 watts
- HAAT: 501 meters (1,644 ft)
- Transmitter coordinates: 34°19′10″N 118°33′18.3″W
- Translator: See § Translators and boosters

Links
- Public license information: Public file; LMS
- Webcast: Listen live; HD2: Listen live
- Website: thesocalsound.org; HD2: bilingualsounds.org

KCSN (88.5 FM, "88.5 The SoCal Sound") is a non-commercial educational radio station licensed to Northridge, California, United States, and owned by California State University, Northridge. The station simulcasts with KSBR from Saddleback College in Mission Viejo. The station primarily airs adult album alternative (AAA) and Americana music with a mix of legends, new music, and local music with some specialty programming on weekends.

KSBR simulcasts this station on 88.5 FM in Orange County.

== History ==
KCSN came to air as KEDC-FM in late 1963. The station signed on with 10 watts, using a transmitter donated by Saul Levine, and broadcast four hours a day of jazz and classical music, in addition to hourly news bulletins produced by San Fernando Valley State College journalism students. Power was increased to 320 watts in 1967 and 3,000 watts in 1970. The 1970 power increase shut out a proposal by the Mexican-American Communication Foundation to build a station on the frequency in East Los Angeles. It became KCSN on February 1, 1973, months after the school became California State University, Northridge; the station was known as "Radio Free Northridge" since 1971.

Beginning in 1987, KCSN aired an all-country format, "Kissin' Country" (a play on how the call letters "KCSN" might be pronounced). The format switch was controversial, earning the station additional donations but alienating it from its student body base. The station also took fire from students who worried that they had less and less of a role in its operation as professional staff were added, in part because KCSN received Corporation for Public Broadcasting grants. In November 1989, two months after classical music station KFAC-FM (92.3) was sold to Evergreen Media and flipped to a "rock with a beat" format, KCSN made a play for those listeners and went all-classical, drawing the ire of the country fans. As a classical station, KCSN also aired specialty shows on weekends and in late night. As the "Best of Public Radio," KCSN's specialty shows were devoted to German music, Broadway showtunes, children's music, soundtrack music, hip-hop, Hawaiian music, blues, folk, the Beatles, surf music, cocktail tunes, electronic music, and more.

KCSN went to an automated adult album alternative (AAA) format from 6 p.m. to 6 a.m. in 2008, removing most of the specialty shows.

=== "Smart rock" ===
On March 1, 2010, KCSN moved all classical music from its primary FM signal to its HD2 channel. The main FM/HD1 channel was switched to an all-AAA programming format without news.

Under the guidance of radio and record company veteran Sky Daniels, some of Los Angeles radio's legendary hosts were hired to host shows on KCSN, including former KCRW host Nic Harcourt; Mark Sovel, the founding music director of Indie 103.1; long-time KROQ host Jed the Fish; and Robert Hilburn, the thirty-year Music Editor for the Los Angeles Times.

In the same time period, Tom Petty and the Heartbreakers played two small-hall benefit concerts for the station. Subsequently, Jackson Browne, The Rides, Ryan Adams, Conor Oberst, David Gray, Sarah McLachlan, and Bonnie Raitt performed at the station's annual benefit concerts. Sting also premiered new songs from the station in August 2016.

Harcourt, who stewarded KCRW's Morning Becomes Eclectic to international recognition, hosts the 6-10 am slot, which he sometimes refers to on-air as "Mornings Are Electric." KCSN is also the L.A. radio partner of World Cafe, the program hosted by Raina Douris of WXPN/Philadelphia.

KCSN also supports local music in the Los Angeles market. Kevin Bronson, the director of Buzzbands L.A., has a show devoted to supporting local musicians. The station's new music library typically is represented with local artists by upwards of 30% of the playlist. KCSN has a roster of shows that include AAA, Americana, and blues genres.

KCSN also supports music by hosting live music sessions and interviews with new, local, and legendary artists, the majority recorded by audio engineers Tristan Dolce and Matt Blake.

KCSN's studios are located in the Valley Performing Arts Center on the CSUN campus. The station also opened a satellite studio at The Village at Westfield Topanga in October 2015.

=== "The New 88.5 FM" and The SoCal Sound ===
On September 6, 2017, California State University, Northridge and Saddleback College, owner of Mission Viejo–based KSBR, announced the merger of their respective radio stations. The combined operation adopted the branding "The New 88.5 FM". On September 12 at 10 a.m. PDT, the FM and HD1 signals of both stations began simulcasting KCSN's pre-existing "smart rock" AAA format, while KSBR's jazz programming would move to their HD2 channels. KCSN's Latin Alternative relocated to both stations' HD3 channels.

On March 21, 2018, 88.5 FM announced that former KSWD (100.3 The Sound) radio personality Andy Chanley would host afternoon drive, taking over for Sky Daniels who continued as General Manager and Program Director. Prior to this, Chanley had guest hosted in Daniels' place for several weeks since January.

On August 18, 2022, it was announced that KCSN would change its branding to "88.5 The SoCal Sound" on August 19.

== Current DJ lineup ==
As of November 1, 2025

- Jet Into Work: Weekday mornings 6-7am. Jet Raskin sets the tone for the day to come.
- Mornings with Nic Harcourt and Jet: Weekday mornings 7-10 am. Regular features include the Latin Alternative Track of the Day; Nic's Pick (a less-played hit or album cut, often from Harcourt's own collection); and the Fresh-Squeezed Track of the Day, a newly released song.
- Middays with Julie Slater: Weekdays 10 am-2 pm. Each week, Slater selects a different (usually newly or recently released) album for the 88.5 Album Dive; every day at approximately noon, Slater will play one or two tracks from that album, often accompanied by interview segments with or written insights from the featured artists. Slater's partner Jason Friday joins the program Fridays at 1 pm for "Friday on a Friday," a variety segment often featuring clips from their podcast "CUZ I HAVE TO…when living your dream is the only option."
- The Drive with Mookie: Weekdays 2-4 pm. Station program director Marc "Mookie" Kaczor starts the afternoon off. Kaczor also has a Saturday morning slot, 10 am to noon.
- The Matt Pinfield Show: Weekdays 4-6 pm. Pinfield has two regular features: "Cover Me," spotlighting a cover of a well-known song (or a lesser-known original whose cover gained more fame); and "120 Seconds," which showcases a song whose video was featured on the MTV show he once hosted, with background info on the artist/s and album squeezed into the preceding 120 seconds. Pinfield also has the 11 am-2 pm slot on Sunday middays.
- Nic at Six: Weeknights 6-7 pm. Nic Harcourt returns for an hour of music to start the evening.
- Evenings with Rob Romero: Weeknights 7-9 pm.
- Bilingual Sounds: Weeknights 9-11 pm. Byron "The Curator" Gonzalez puts together and plays themed sets of music in English, Spanish, and additional languages.
- Quiet is the New Loud: Weeknights 11 pm-midnight. An hour of lower-tempo songs to encourage relaxation.
- Saturdays with Hillary Gordon: Saturdays noon-2 pm. Former radio and music executive Gordon takes over the DJ booth.
- Peace, Love, and Saturdays with Mimi Chen: Saturday afternoons 2-6 pm.
- Artist in Residence series: Saturday evenings 6-7 pm. Each month, a different artist takes over the station's airwaves for one hour on Saturdays. The only limits are FCC rules, and participating artists are welcome to combine their playlists with interviews or in-studio guests or more. Previous artists in residence include Joe Walsh, Sleater-Kinney, Moby, Dan Auerbach, Chris Shiflett of Foo Fighters, Wilco, Craig Finn, Butch Vig, and Beabadoobee.
- Saturday Evening with Barry Funkhouser: Saturdays 8-10 pm.

=== Specialty shows ===
- The Soundtrack with Lev Spiro: Last Wednesday of the month, 8-9 pm. Spiro typically presents a playlist of music featured in film and television.
- Rock n Roll Times with Robert Hilburn: Wednesday overnights, midnight-1 am. Hilburn blends a themed playlist with his own experiences from six decades of covering the artists within.
- Americana Matinee with Kat Griffin: Saturdays 8-10 am. Griffin covers mainly new music in the diaspora of American roots music, including traditional and contemporary bluegrass, folk, blues, country, and Americana.
- Start Static with Rick Savage: Saturdays 7-8 pm. A celebration of 1990s and 2000s rock and alternative.
- Deeper Grooves with Cliff Beach: Saturdays 10-11 pm. Beach focuses on "all music that grooves"—pop, funk, soul, R&B, disco, and more.
- Indie Beginnings with Mookie and Barry Funkhouser: Sundays 6-7 am. The two DJs spotlight a different pioneer of indie rock each week.
- Tangled Roots with Pat Baker: Sundays 7-9 am. Baker presents an eclectic mix of past and present in American roots music.
- The Dylan Hours with Lisa Finnie: Sundays 9-11 am. A look at the genre-defying discography of Bob Dylan.
- The Open Road with Gary Calamar: Sundays 2-4 pm. A musician and music supervisor for film and TV, Calamar presents a playlist he calls "adventurous pop music both timely and timeless."
- Super Sounds of the 70s with Bob Goodman: Sundays 4-6 pm. A genre-spanning look at the 1970s.
- Soul Sundays with Ty Taylor: Sundays 6-8 pm. Taylor, the lead singer of Los Angeles band Vintage Trouble, presents two hours of soul and rhythm and blues.
- Ann the Raven's Blues: Sundays 8-10 pm. Two hours dedicated to the blues genre and its artists past and present.
- L.A. Buzz Bands with Kevin Bronson: Sundays 10-11 pm. A look at up-and-coming bands in the Los Angeles scene.
- The Sway Out West Radio Hour with Zach Lupetin: Sundays 11 pm-midnight. A playlist of singers and songwriters with a western American flavor, curated by the lead guitarist for Americana band Dustbowl Revival.
- Galactic Voyager with Meishel: Sunday overnights midnight-1 am. Electronic, New Age, and ambient music.

== HD programming ==
In October 2013, the HD2 channel dropped classical and launched a new format known as Latin alternative, which includes Latin pop, modern rock, classic rock, hip-hop dance music and salsoul. . This format then moved to HD3 as part of the KSBR programming partnership as KSBR's Jazz programming moved to HD2.

KCSN also mentors California State University, Northridge students in broadcasting, music industry, audio engineering and news production. Students produce six-minute morning news segments that air at 6:30am and 7:30am and three-minute segments at 7am and 8am. A nightly half-hour news program called the Evening Update airs at 6pm.

The news department of KCSN has received almost 500 news awards under the leadership of Keith Goldstein, who died in 2016.

These news programs are heard on the HD3 channel.

== Translators and boosters ==
Broadcast translators for KCSN
Call sign	Frequency	City of license	FID	FCC info
K210EO	89.9 FM	Santa Paula, California	93735	LMS
K210CH	89.9 FM	Ventura, California	90441	LMS
KCSN-FM1	88.5 FM	West Los Angeles	137504	LMS

== See also ==
- Campus radio
- KSBR
- List of college radio stations in the United States
