= Frank Murphy (radio personality) =

American radio personality

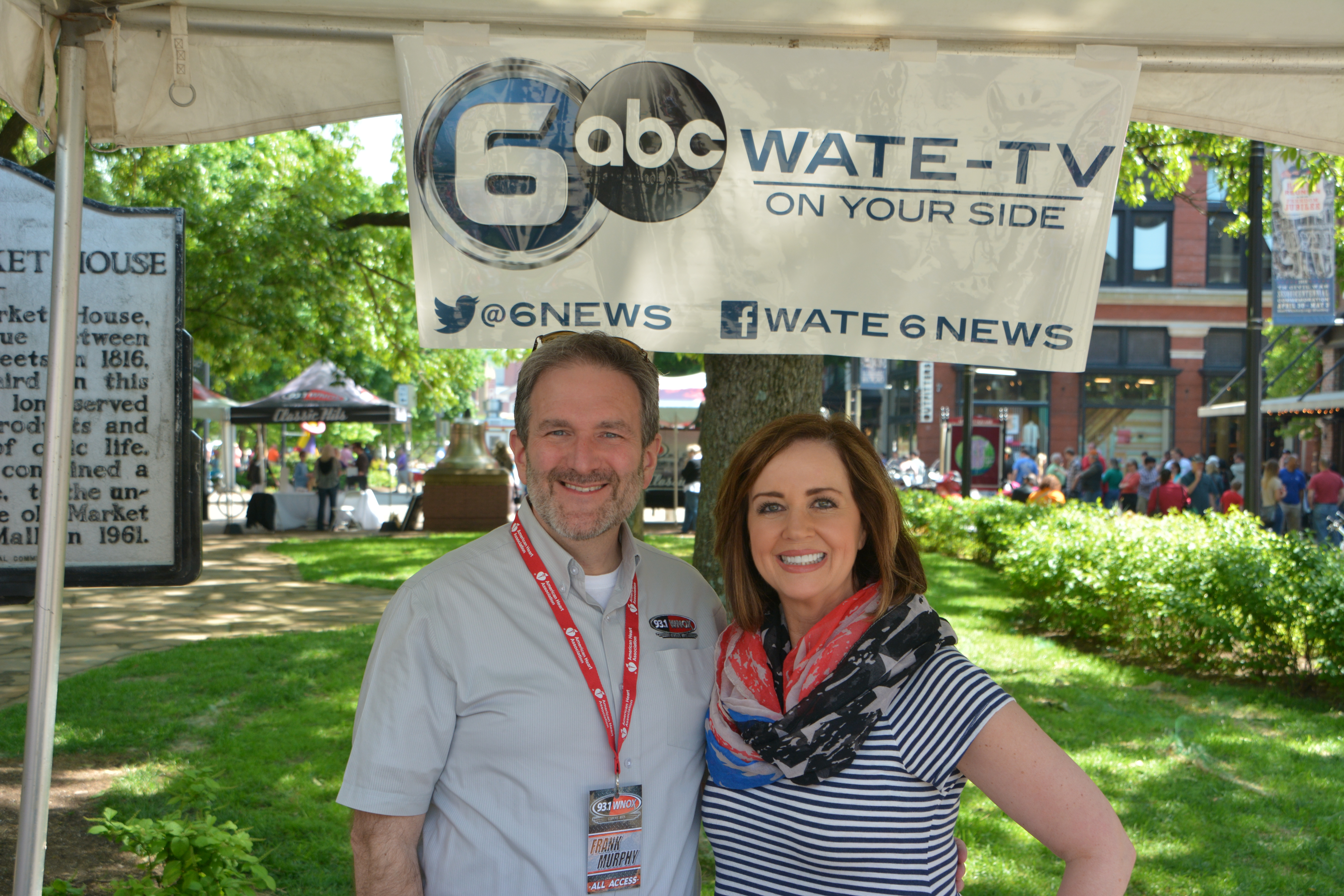
Radio Host Frank Murphy with award winning WATE Reporter/Anchor Lori Tucker at Rossini Festival

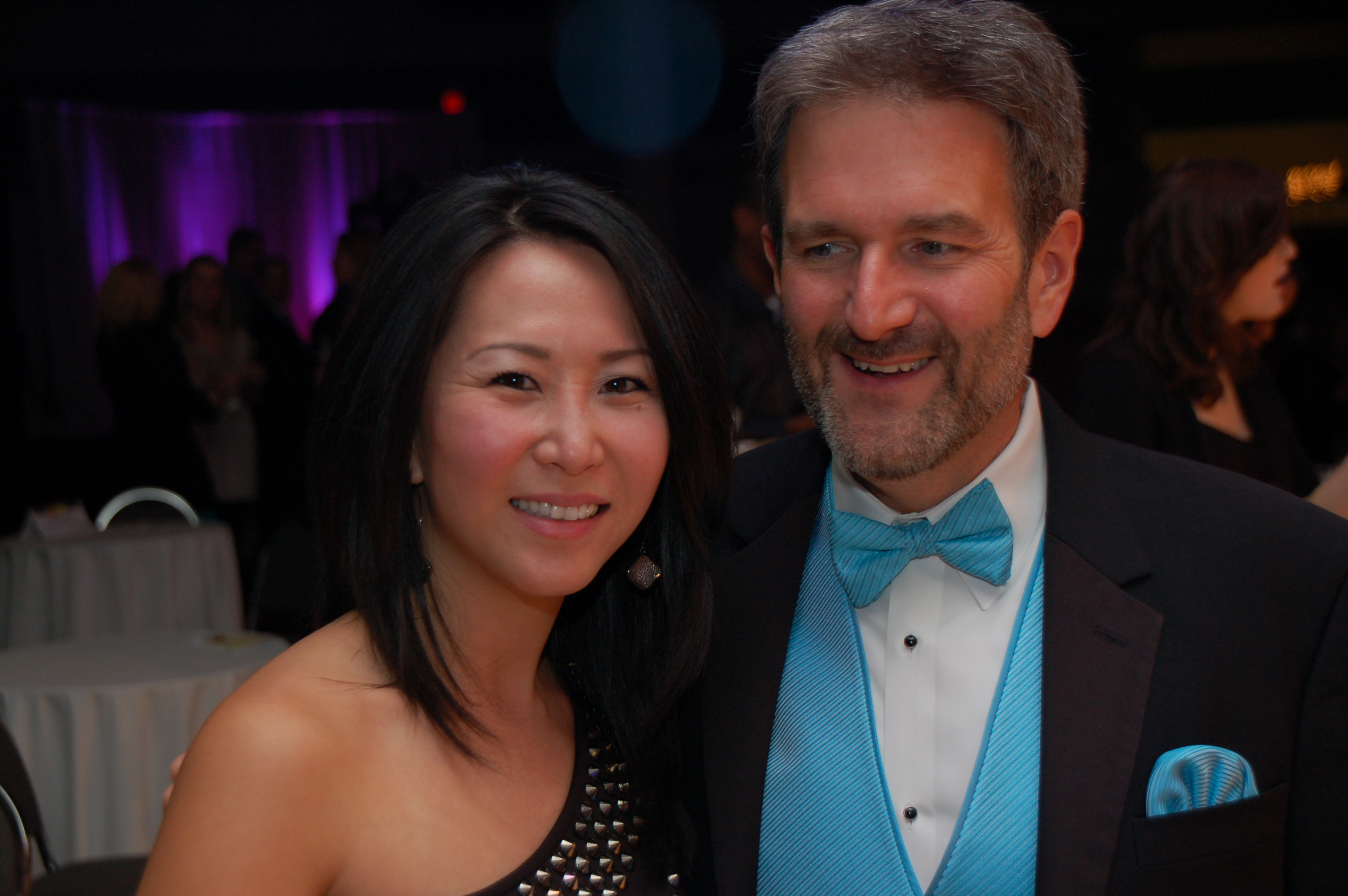
Frank Murphy at the 2012 Dancing With the Knoxville Stars Competition. With him is multi-award winning reporter Hana Kim-Kennedy. A classmate of his in the FBI Citizens Academy

Frank Murphy is known as a radio and television personality in Knoxville, Tennessee. He was formerly a producer for high-profile morning shows in Washington, DC and Los Angeles, CA.

Frank is host and head writer of Tennessee Scholars' Bowl, which airs weekdays on East Tennessee PBS and on six PBS stations statewide as part of the "Teaching Tennessee" block of programs.

Murphy was the 2014 Knoxville recipient of the FBI Director's Community Leadership Award. In 2014, he was the Social Media inductee in the Friends of Literacy East Tennessee Writers Hall of Fame. Frank was named Best Local Blogger in the 2012 Metro Pulse readers survey. He was also voted East Tennessee's Best Local Blogger in 2008 and was voted first runner up in 2007, 2009 and 2010 by readers of the Knoxville News Sentinel.

== Radio experience - producer ==
=== Early career ===
Murphy began his radio career in 1982 at the campus radio station of George Mason University, WGMU. That summer he worked the midday shift at WVBK-AM in Herndon, Virginia, without being paid. At the start of 1983, he was named station manager of WGMU, just as it was transitioning from a closed circuit broadcast available only in the Rathskeller to a carrier current transmission which could be heard in the dorms and student apartments on any AM radio.

A WGMU air band contest caught the attention of Denise Benoit, the promotion director of WAVA-FM. She contacted Murphy and hired him as her intern for the summer of 1984. At the end of his internship, Murphy was hired by the station as its assistant promotion director, a position he held until 1986. During 1985 Murphy was heard on the air reading snow closing announcements in the morning or doing an occasional weekend air shift. He was most often heard as part of Don Geronimo's afternoon drive program, especially when the show would broadcast from local bars on Friday afternoons.

=== The Don and Mike Show, WAVA ===
In November 1986, Murphy replaced John Nolan as morning show producer for the Don and Mike Show. In this position, he regularly made appearances on the show, often when something went wrong and hosts Don and Mike were heard to yell out "Fraaaank". Frequent guest Bobcat Goldthwait would jokingly refer to him as "the omnipresent Frank." He continued in that job until Don & Mike left WAVA in 1991 upon the announcement of the station's sale to Salem Communications.

Murphy served as morning host until the sale became final. During that time, Murphy won the Best New Talent in the Market award at the March of Dimes Achievement In Radio Awards. When the sale's closing was delayed, Murphy partnered with afternoon host Joe Friday and traffic reporter Janet from Another Planet to create a new morning show for the station's last few months.

WAVA changed format on February 12, 1992.

=== The Jay Thomas Show, KPWR ===
Five days after WAVA changed formats, Murphy began a new job as morning show producer for Jay Thomas at KPWR (Power 106) in Los Angeles. While there, Murphy appeared as an extra in the movie It's Pat and as a featured extra in episode 17 ("Two on the Aisle") of the first season of Jay Thomas's sitcom, Love & War. Thomas left the radio station in 1993.

=== The Kevin & Bean Show, KROQ ===
A few months later Murphy departed KPWR for a job as morning show producer for Kevin and Bean at KROQ. He worked alongside Jimmy Kimmel and Adam Carolla and often participated in on-air segments. Kevin & Bean once challenged Murphy to sell over 1,000 boxes of Girl Scout Cookies for his daughter.

Underground singer-songwriter Wesley Willis visited KROQ several times. He wrote and performed on-air a song titled "Frank Murphy." The lyrics included the lines: "You are a working-class dog. You are a producer for the Kevin & Bean Show. You work hard at 106.7 KROQ. You are a working-class man."

=== The Mark & Brian Show, KLOS ===
In 1996, Murphy was hired as executive producer of the syndicated Mark and Brian show based at KLOS. Mark & Brian would refer to him as "Mr. Owl" due to his love of trivial information. He participated in the annual "Football Bet," always choosing to support the Washington Redskins. His unusual punishments included cleaning a public restroom, collecting semen from a bull and picking the nose of a stranger. He was also known for writing the difficult trivia questions for the "You Can't Win" game.

== Radio experience - on air ==
=== Morning Show, KLYY ===
In February 1999, Murphy reported for jury duty at the L.A. County Criminal Courts Building. During his two weeks of service, he was accepted a job as co-host of the morning show on KLYY (Y-107). By the end of the year, the station had switched to a Spanish language format and all the on-air personalities had been fired.

=== FM in the AM, Comedy World Radio Network ===
Murphy was unemployed until being contacted in early 2000 by radio host Brian Whitman about a new Internet company called Comedy World. Murphy joined the new company as both producer of a talk show co-hosted by comedian Allan Havey and actress Susan Olsen and as host of his own weekend talk show called FM in the AM. By 2001, the company had become known as the Comedy World Radio Network and had added terrestrial radio affiliates in Syracuse, Atlantic City, Spokane, Reno and Savannah/Charleston. In April of that year the company filed bankruptcy, leaving Murphy and his co-workers unemployed.

=== Phil & Murphy in the Morning, WOKI ===
Murphy did a number of odd jobs around Hollywood until being hired as co-host of a morning show in Knoxville, Tennessee. In April 2002, the Phil & Murphy in the Morning show debuted on 100.3 The River (WOKI). Murphy worked with longtime Knoxville personalities Phil Williams and newsman David Henley. In July 2003, the entire staff was dismissed when ownership of The River transferred from Dick Broadcasting to Citadel Communications.

=== Ashley & Murphy in the Morning, WRMX/WTXM ===
Murphy soon landed a job working with Ashley Adams at Oldies 95.7 & 106.7 (WRMX & WTXM). The morning show was renamed Ashley & Murphy in the Morning. Murphy was let go in early 2005, shortly before the station adopted the satellite-delivered Jack FM format.

=== Marc & Kim and Frank Show, WWST ===
In April 2005, Murphy joined Marc Anthony and Kim Hansard for the Marc & Kim and Frank show at Star 102.1 (WWST). It was renamed the Marc & Kim Show in June 2013 when Frank left the show to concentrate on his duties at sister station WNOX. Murphy was also heard on weekends as a music deejay and as one of two rotating hosts of the cluster's public affairs program.

=== WNOX ===
From November, 2013 to December, 2019, Murphy hosted the afternoon show on 93.1 WNOX, which aired a classic hits format. Murphy often represented WNOX as emcee of various functions including the City of Knoxville's New Year's Eve celebration, the Knox Asian Festival, the Greater Knoxville Heart Walk, and the Walk to End Alzheimer's. Murphy hosted the station's morning show from January 2 to September 4, 2020.

=== WPLA ===
On February 15, 2021, Murphy began hosting the midday show on 104.9 WPLA, which aired a classic hits format under the brand LakeFM. He was moved to the afternoon shift in 2022.

=== WGAP ===
On September 25, 2023, Murphy began hosting the afternoon show on 105.9 & 1400 WGAP, which aired a classic hits format under the brand FUN 105.9.

=== WJXB ===
On August 1, 2025, Murphy joined WJXB as a weekend/swing announcer. He hosts the cluster's public affairs show, "East Tennessee Now," which airs Sunday mornings and is published as a podcast.

== Television career ==
In 2016, Murphy began hosting Tennessee Scholars' Bowl, a long-running televised academic quiz show in which high school teams compete in a single-elimination tournament. He was one of two hosts for the 2017 and 2018 seasons and became the sole host beginning with the show's 35th season, which aired in 2019. He became the show's head writer beginning with the 40th season in 2024.

Scholar's Bowl has been on East Tennessee PBS since 1985. Previous hosts include Hop Edwards, Jim Kuehn, Diana Morgan, Sanda Allyson, Jack Ryan, and Ernie Roberts. Approximately 60 episodes are recorded each October and November. The new shows air on weeknights during January, February, and March and are repeated over the summer. Previous seasons are repeated in the Spring and Fall.

In May, 2021, Murphy began hosting a half-hour interview show on East Tennessee PBS called Up Close with Frank Murphy. The show airs once a month and past episodes are found on the PBS Passport app. Interviewees include Dr. Jerry Punch, Dr. Dawnie Steadman, Kathryn Frady, Leanne Morgan, Cylk Cozart, Emily Ann Roberts, Ricky "The Dragon" Steamboat, and others.

== Improv career ==
Murphy took an improv class in 2000 from the City of Burbank Department of Parks & Recreation. The class was titled "Improv for Ages 13 and Up" and was taught by Steve Saracino.

In June 2002, Murphy joined the comedy improv group Einstein Simplified. They perform short-form improv every Tuesday night at Scruffy City Hall on Market Square in downtown Knoxville. Prior to Scruffy City Hall, the troupe performed at Manhattan's, Patrick Sullivan's, The Square Room, Side Splitters, and The Well. Murphy retired from the troupe in 2024 but occasionally returns to perform in special anniversary shows.

In addition to their weekly show, the members of Einstein Simplified perform at private parties and corporate functions. For three years they performed at the First Night Knoxville celebration on New Year's Eve.

The group was cast in the partially improvised horror film Fish Bait in 2008. Filming took place in early October on Norris Lake. Murphy plays a character named "Frank" who books a fishing trip with three buddies when things go awry.

In 2019, filmmaker John Hudgens began filming a documentary titled Chair! that explores comedy improv through the experience of Einstein Simplified's 25th anniversary.

== Blogging and Podcasting ==
Murphy wrote a blog on his website from 2005 to 2015. He often wrote about the Body Farm, radio, TV, figs, Catholicism and improv.

He was voted Favorite Local Blogger in the 2008 Knoxville News Sentinel "East Tennessee's Best" readers poll. He was first runner up in the same poll in 2007, 2009 and 2010. He was voted Best Local Blogger in Metro Pulse's Best of Knoxville 2012 survey.

Murphy was the 2014 Social Media inductee in the Friends of Literacy East Tennessee Writers Hall of Fame.

He has a podcast and YouTube channel called the Frank & Friends Show.

== Community Involvement ==
In 2012, Murphy was elected to a two-year term as president of the FBI Knoxville Citizens Academy Alumni Association, a private, non-profit organization that is not part of the Federal Bureau of Investigation. His term expired in January, 2014. He participated in the FBI Citizens Academy in 2009.

Also in 2012, Murphy was appointed to the Knoxville Community Advisory Council of Catholic Charities of East Tennessee. He has served as honorary chairman of their Kids Helping Kids Fun Walk to benefit Columbus Home since 2010. In 2012 and 2013, he chose Columbus Home as his charity of choice when competing in the Host with the Most Contest at Side Splitters Comedy Club. He took the first place prize both years.

In 2014, Murphy was elected to an at-large seat on the board of the East Tennessee Society of Professional Journalists for a two-year term which ended in 2016. He also performed in their annual fundraiser, "The Front Page Follies." In 2015, he was appointed to an at-large seat on the board of the new Front Page Foundation, which assumed responsibilities for staging "The Front Page Follies." In 2016, he was elected president of the Front Page Foundation and served until the end of 2018.

Frank often volunteers as an on-camera host for East Tennessee PBS pledge drives. He regularly serves as emcee for various Bone Zones events, which feature lectures by world-famous forensic anthropologist Dr. William M. Bass.

In 2011, Murphy appeared as "The Governor" in the Oak Ridge Civic Ballet Association's production of The Nutcracker. He reprised the role in 2012, 2013, 2017, 2018 and 2019. He was the narrator for their production of The Ugly Duckling in 2012 and 2016 and narrator for Into the Woods in 2018. He portrayed one of Cinderella's ugly stepsisters in 2013 and 2015. He played the king in The Sleeping Beauty in 2014 and Maurice in Beauty & the Beast in 2017. In the 2014, 2015, and 2016 productions of The Nutcracker, Murphy played Drosselmeyer, the magical toymaker. In 2016, ORCBA honored Murphy as their Volunteer of the Year at the Arts Council of Oak Ridge awards ceremony.

On November 18, 2014, the FBI Knoxville Division announced that Frank Murphy was that year's recipient of the FBI Director's Community Leadership Award. He was recognized with winners from the other field offices at a ceremony in Washington, D.C., on May 1, 2015.

Murphy won the title of Man of the Year in the Leukemia & Lymphoma Society's Man & Woman of the Year fundraising competition in 2017.

Murphy was voted "Knoxville's Finest Emcee" by the readers of Blank Newspaper in 2018 and 2024.

From 2020 to 2024, Murphy was on the board of Marble City Opera.
