= KCMG =

KCMG may refer to:

- KC Motorgroup, based in Hong Kong, China
- Knight Commander of the Order of St Michael and St George, British honour
- KCMG-LP, radio station in New Mexico, USA
- Los Angeles radio station KKLQ (FM), which used the KCMG call letters from 1997 to 2001.
