= Van Vo =

Vietnamese-American talk show host

- Born: 1950 (age 75–76)
- Occupations: Radio host; political commentator
- Political party: Republican

Van Vo (born 1950) is a Vietnamese-American talk show host, who ran in the 2003 California gubernatorial recall election.

Vo, a Republican and staunch anti-Communist, was called "the Rush Limbaugh of Little Saigon", thanks to his radio program, "Living in America" ("Đai Phat Thanh Song Tren Đat My" in Vietnamese); as of 2003, it was the longest-running Vietnamese-language radio talk show in California. The program was produced in Garden Grove, California and was aired on several stations, including KXMX in Anaheim, weekdays from 6pm to 6am and all day in Saturdays and Sunday.

Vo's program was taken off the air when he decided to enter the California gubernatorial recall election as a Republican in 2003. Campaigning mostly near his home of Garden Grove (but also taking trips to San Francisco and San Jose), Vo received 7,226 votes (with 48% of the votes cast for him coming from Orange County), finishing in 13th place.

Vo has since relocated to Las Vegas and his radio program is now available on the internet.
