= Sound check (disambiguation) =

Sound check, Sound Check, or soundcheck may refer to:

- Soundcheck, the preparation that takes place before a concert
- Soundcheck (album), a 2009 album by Finnish rock band Circle
- Soundcheck (Leslie West album), a 2015 album
- Soundcheck (radio program), a talk radio program about music and the arts
- Soundcheck (song), a 2016 single by Welsh indie band Catfish and the Bottlemen
- Sound Check (iTunes feature), a volume normalization system in iTunes
- "Soundcheck" (Odd Squad), a segment from a 2014 television episode
- "Sound Check (Gravity)", a song from the 2001 Gorillaz self titled album
- "Sound Check", a 2025 track by Toby Fox from Deltarune Chapters 3+4 OST from the video game Deltarune

== See also ==
- Mr. Shovel's Check One Two
- Mic check (phrase)
