= KFSH =

KFSH may refer to:

- KAIA-FM, a radio station licensed to La Mirada, California, which formerly used the call sign KFSH-FM.
- King Faisal Specialist Hospital, a private hospital in Saudi Arabia
