= Trey Callaway =

American screenwriter and producer

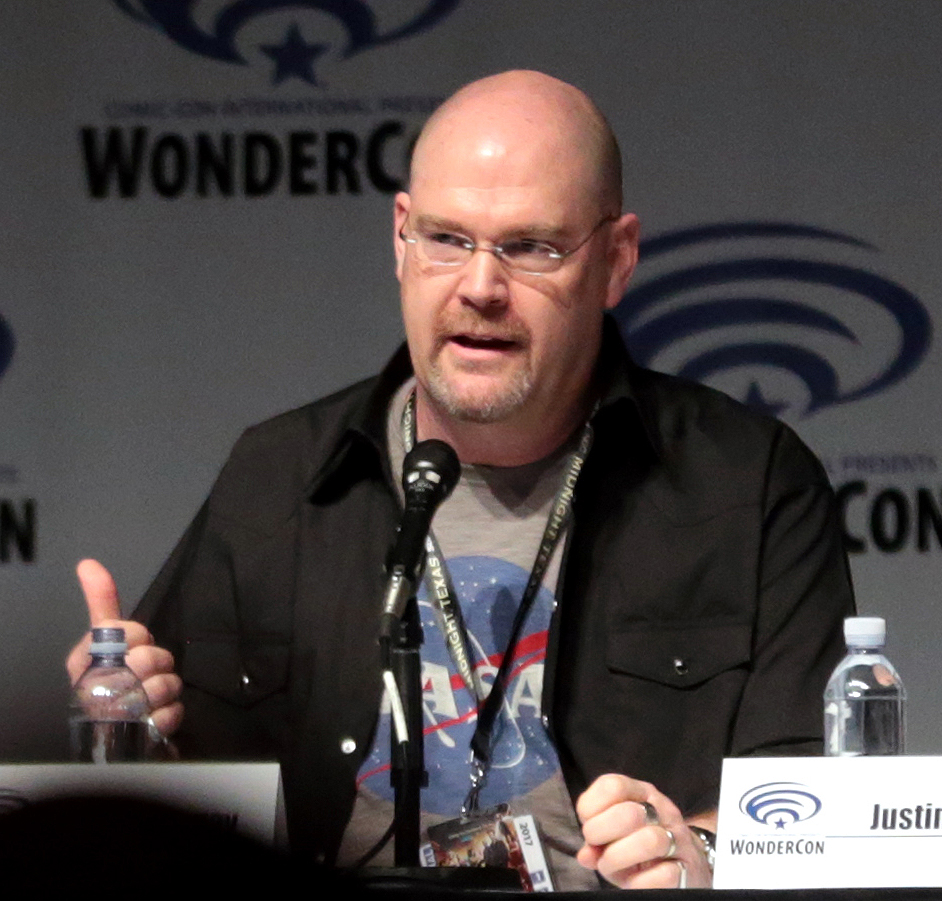
- Callaway in 2017 at Wondercon
- Occupations: Screenwriter, teacher

Trey Callaway is an American film and television writer and producer. His work includes 9-1-1: Lone Star, CSI: NY, Rush Hour, Revolution, Station 19, and Supernatural, for which he created the popular recurring characters known as the Ghostfacers. He has penned original pilots for multiple American entertainment companies including Netflix, Amazon Studios, CBS, ABC, the CW, Turner Network Television, Showtime Network, A&E, and The Disney Channel.

A graduate of Jenks High School in Jenks, Oklahoma, Callaway was once an on-air radio personality at KRMG (AM) in Tulsa, Oklahoma.

== Career ==
Callaway was the executive producer and co-showrunner of the Amazon Prime Video series House of David, as well as the Fox Television crime procedural APB and was the showrunner of The CW drama The Messengers. He also wrote the screenplay for the movie I Still Know What You Did Last Summer. He co-created and executive produced the science fiction television series Mercy Point on the UPN network. Callaway performed as an actor in the series and among other roles, also had an uncredited speaking role in The Outsiders.

Callaway is a co-creator of the Be Good Humans Podcast, which he hosts with actor, comedian, and Radio Hall of Fame inductee Brian Phelps, formerly of the nationally syndicated Mark & Brian radio program.

Callaway is also a professor in the USC School of Cinematic Arts at the University of Southern California.
