= The Adventures of Mark & Brian =

- Genre: Comedy; Reality Television
- Written by: Ed Decter
- Starring: Mark Thompson; Brian Phelps
- Theme music composer: Larry Benjamin; Chris Black
- Country of origin: United States
- Original language: English
- No. of seasons: 1
- No. of episodes: 13

Production
- Running time: 30 minutes
- Production companies: Don Mischer Productions; Frontier Pictures; New World Television; TriStar Television

Original release
- Network: NBC
- Release: September 9, 1991 – May 31, 1992

The Adventures of Mark & Brian is an American comedy television program that was broadcast by NBC from September 9, 1991 to May 31, 1992 as part of its 1991 fall lineup.

== Background ==
The Adventures of Mark & Brian was an attempt to base a television series on a series of radio bits that had been done on KLOS radio in Los Angeles since 1987 by morning hosts Mark Thompson and Brian Phelps. Each week, the two dreamed up a new stunt that they wanted to perform (such as having Robert Goulet sing from a helicopter on Valentine's Day, or having a giant head sculpture of Elvis Presley towed cross-country to Memphis). A film crew then followed them as they did this.

== Broadcast information ==
Thompson and Phelps had gotten tremendous Arbitron ratings by doing this sort of thing during morning drive-time on the radio in Los Angeles, but received only very low Nielsen ratings doing it on prime time television. Despite tremendous promotion of the duo by NBC, particularly during the NFL games that frequently served as its lead-in, the program was cancelled in November, although NBC showed the unaired episodes with reruns in the summer of 1992.
