= KYLA =

Radio Nueva Vida radio station in Fountain Valley, California

- Fountain Valley, California; United States
- Broadcast area: Greater Los Angeles; Orange County
- Frequency: 92.7 MHz (HD Radio)
- Branding: Radio Nueva Vida

Programming
- Language: Spanish
- Format: Spanish Christian
- Subchannels: HD2: K-LOVE; HD3: K-LOVE 2000s
- Network: Radio Nueva Vida

Ownership
- Owner: Educational Media Foundation
- Operator: The Association For Community Education, Inc.
- Sister stations: KAIA; KAIV; KKLQ

History
- First air date: 1993; 33 years ago
- Former call signs: KOUG (1991–1992); KRCI (1992–1997); KLIT (1997–2007); KJLL-FM (2007–2012); KLST-FM (2012–2013)

Technical information
- Licensing authority: FCC
- Facility ID: 9304
- Class: A
- ERP: 690 watts
- HAAT: 293 meters (961 ft)
- Transmitter coordinates: 33°36′20.1″N 117°48′38.2″W

Links
- Public license information: Public file; LMS
- Website: nuevavida.com

KYLA is a non-commercial FM radio station that is licensed to Fountain Valley and serves Orange County on the 92.7 MHz frequency. KYLA is owned by Educational Media Foundation but operated by The Association for Community Education, and broadcasts the national Radio Nueva Vida Spanish Christian radio network.

From 1997 to 2025, KYLA was a trimulcast with KYRA and KYZA, both also on 92.7 FM. The trimulcast went through many formats until 2013 when the stations adopted the Air1 format. In February 2025, the trimulcast was split, with KYLA switching to Radio Nueva Vida and the other two stations continuing with Air1.

== History ==
=== Early years ===
KYLA signed on in 1993 with the call letters KRCI and originally broadcast from Catalina Island at 3,000 watts. Founding owner Lewis Sher's Catalina Radio sold the nostalgia station to Joseph Amaturo's Amaturo Group for $600,000 in 1995. In 1997, KRCI changed its call sign to KLIT, and began a trimulcast with KMLT in Thousand Oaks and a third Amaturo-owned station, KXEZ (later KELT) in Riverside. The goal of the Amaturos was to cover all of Los Angeles and Orange counties with three stations on one frequency, 92.7 FM. Initially, the trimulcast aired a beautiful music format that evolved to a soft AC music format branded as "Lite 92.7". During the early 2000s, the Lite 92.7 trimulcast aired the nationally syndicated request-and-dedication program Delilah.

KLIT was moved to Fountain Valley, California, with a change of transmitter location, broadcasting from a mountain southeast of Newport Beach, California, at 690 watts. This provided a better signal coverage of the interior portions of Orange County.

=== 92.7 Jill FM and Playlist 92.7 ===
The trimulcast's coverage area was shifted after the moves of all three transmitters, and with the arrival of Jack FM on KCBS-FM (93.1 FM) in 2005, Amaturo Group moved to compete. The company dismissed the airstaff of the "Lite 92.7" stations and adopted an automated adult hits music format branded as "Jill FM". The new format was geared to be a more female-friendly sound, known as Jill, as opposed to the more male-oriented format on Jack FM. KLIT's call sign was changed to KJLL-FM in 2007, with KMJL becoming KHJL and KELT—now in Adelanto—becoming KAJL. In 2009, Jill FM adjusted its format to soft adult contemporary music with the same focus as rival KOST (103.5 FM).

On February 14, 2011, the stations dropped the "Jill FM" name and rebranded as "Playlist 92.7", a classic hits outlet with the slogan "We play everything". The first song played on Playlist was "Somebody" by Bryan Adams. The new format featured hit songs spanning the period from 1964 to 2010, consisting of a mix of top 40, R&B, adult contemporary and alternative rock. The call signs were again changed in 2012: KJLL-FM became KLST-FM, KHJL became KLSN, and KAJL became KLSI.

=== Air1 ===
On December 1, 2012, at midnight, KLST/KLSN/KLSI officially flipped from AC to the national Christian contemporary hit radio (Christian CHR) network Air1 under new owner Educational Media Foundation. This transaction brought the Christian CHR format to suburban areas of Los Angeles with the station's multiple rimshot Class A signals. At the time of the flip, Air1 played music from a wide variety of contemporary Christian artists such as Tauren Wells, TobyMac, Group 1 Crew, Seventh Day Slumber, and Skillet. The feed is also heard on KTLW's network of Class A FM translators in portions of the northern Los Angeles area as well as on a 92.7 FM repeater in southwestern parts of the metro. In 2013, the trimulcast's call signs were once again changed: KLST-FM became KYLA, KLSN became KYRA, and KLSI became KYZA. The Air1 network flipped to contemporary worship music on January 1, 2019.

In February 2025, after KFSH-FM and six other Christian contemporary music stations owned by the Salem Media Group were bought by Educational Media Foundation for $80 million, that station adopted the Air1 format as KAIA. On February 20, 2025, KYLA dropped the Air1 network and replaced it with Radio Nueva Vida, ending the KYLA-KYRA-KYZA trimulcast for the first time since 1997. KYRA—renamed KAIV on February 6, 2025—and KYZA continue to carry Air1.
