= Mr. Shovel's Check One Two =

Mr. Shovel's Check One Two is a radio program which most recently aired on 95.5 KLOS in Los Angeles from January 2016 through 2019. The show originally aired on Indie 103.1 in Los Angeles from February 2004 to January 2009. The show featured local and independent artists in addition to live performances. It was created by host Mr. Shovel (Mark Sovel), Indie 103.1's music director and the producer of Jonesy's Jukebox hosted by Sex Pistols member Steve Jones. Jones bestowed the nickname "Mr. Shovel" on Sovel after continuously mispronouncing Sovel's last name. In 2004, Indie 103.1 was dubbed "America's Coolest Commercial Station" by Rolling Stone and again voted as the "Best Radio Station" in 2008.

Check One Two aired Sunday nights from 6pm to 8pm on Indie 103.1 giving many Los Angeles–area bands their first commercial radio airplay. That led to several unsigned local bands being added to "regular rotation" on Indie 103.1 and often significant record deals. Some notable names which received early support from Indie 103.1 and Check One Two were The Airborne Toxic Event, Silversun Pickups, She Wants Revenge, Cold War Kids, Warpaint, and The Submarines. Sovel made music news in the winter of 2008 when he and Indie 103.1 program director Max Tolkoff, were summoned to Prince's home. Prince played for them a record which later became Lotusflower. Prince handed Sovel and Tolkoff the music to take with them to premiere on Indie 103.1. Sovel appeared the next day on Jonesy's Jukebox with the music and stories about the visit.

On January 15, 2009, Indie suddenly went off the air to be replaced by a Spanish language format. Indie 103.1 and Check One Two's support is regarded as having been a uniting factor in the local music scene in Los Angeles in the first decade of the 21st century. Between the years 2012 and 2016, Mr. Shovel (Sovel) hosted the freeform radio show City of Night on public radio station 88.5 KCSN, where he also served as the station's music director.

On the show Shovel interviewed Dave Gahan of Depeche Mode , John Lydon (Johnny Rotten), Father John Misty, My Morning Jacket, and others. During those years Sovel was the voice announcer for the KCET public television program Artbound presents: Studio A in partnership with KCSN, featuring a live studio audience and televised performances from Chelsea Wolfe, Jenny Lewis, Chicano Batman, and Best Coast. Sovel also was the voice of the KCET television shows Artbound, and Border Blaster for four seasons from 2014 to 2016. After returning to FM in January 2016, Mr. Shovel's Check One Two championed a new era of artists including Starcrawler, Phoebe Bridgers, Plague Vendor, The Interrupters, and Weyes Blood. The show aired live every Sunday night at 8pm on KLOS. Also, in October 2015 Mr. Shovel re-joined Steve Jones as producer and on-air foil for a new incarnation of Jonesy's Jukebox on 95.KLOS every Monday through Friday from noon to 2pm.

In addition to his broadcast career, Sovel is an actor and has been a member of SAG-AFTRA since 1991.
