= Two:Thirteen =

- Film poster
- Directed by: Charles Adelman
- Written by: Mark Thompson
- Produced by: Charles Adelman; Mark Thompson; David Armstrong; Keith Walley; G. Richard Beddingfield
- Starring: Mark Thompson; Mark Pellegrino; Teri Polo; Kevin Pollak; Dwight Yoakam
- Release date: 2009
- Country: United States
- Language: English

Two:Thirteen (sometimes titled 2wo:Thirteen, or simply 2:13 ), is a 2009 horror/thriller film directed by Charles Adelman and starring Mark Thompson, Mark Pellegrino, Teri Polo, and Kevin Pollak.

== Synopsis ==
Despite suffering a traumatic past and battling a drinking problem, Russell Spivey is a successful police profiler. When he rejoins his team after a stint on psychiatric leave and finds himself on the trail of a serial killer, he must set aside his personal issues and do what he does best - delve into the mind of a murderer. But as Spivey gets closer to solving the case, it appears that the killer is now targeting him. Each victim is found with a mask - an all-too-familiar object of his childhood - and word games that leave him puzzled. Spivey must catch up with the Masked Murderer before he loses everyone he loves and his future becomes just as dark as his past.

== Cast ==
- Mark Thompson as Russell Spivey
- Mark Pellegrino as John Tyler
- Teri Polo as Amanda Richardson
- Kevin Pollak as Dr. Simmons
- Dwight Yoakam as Sandy
- Kenton Duty as Young Russell Spivey
- Jonathan Decker as Young John Tyler
