= Mark Thompson (DJ) =

American DJ (born 1955)

- Born: Mark LaMarr Thompson; December 1, 1955 (age 70); Florence, Alabama
- Occupations: Radio personality, actor
- Spouse: Lynda
- Children: 3

Mark LaMarr Thompson (born December 26, 1955) is an American radio personality (disc jockey) and occasional actor, best known for the nationally syndicated Mark & Brian morning show.

== Early life ==
After attending the University of North Alabama, Thompson worked as a disc jockey at several stations in the southern United States (including WHHY AM 1440 in Montgomery, Alabama) before meeting his partner Brian Phelps in Birmingham, Alabama in 1986. The next year the duo moved their show to KLOS-FM in Los Angeles, where they remained until the show's end in 2012. Thompson's wife, Lynda, their three children (Matthew, Amy and Katie), his nephew David, and his niece Nina are well known among regular listeners of the program. Thompson and Phelps garnered a 1991 National Association of Broadcasters Marconi Award as "Air Personalities of the Year."

== Career ==
The popularity of The Mark & Brian Show gave Thompson several opportunities to branch out into other entertainment media. In 1991-92, he and Phelps hosted a short-lived NBC TV series, The Adventures of Mark & Brian, based on their radio show. Thompson has also appeared in several motion pictures, notably Jason Goes to Hell: The Final Friday (the 1993 ninth installment in the Friday the 13th series) and The Princess Diaries (2001). He also wrote and starred in the 2002 independent film, Mother Ghost, and briefly appeared as a love interest (coincidentally named Brian) of Reba McEntire's character on three episodes in the 2002-2003 season of the Reba television show.

On June 13, 2012, Thompson announced that he would be retiring from radio after 25 years and would move to Charlotte, North Carolina with his wife, mentioning that his new home would be equipped with a studio that would allow him to do occasional media work. His last day at KLOS was August 17, 2012. Thompson and his wife host The Mark & Lynda Podcast, which focuses primarily on relationship issues. In addition, Thompson co-hosted the Pro Football Slam podcast with Los Angeles Times journalist Sam Farmer during the 2013-2014 football season. That podcast did not return for the 2014-2015 season. He also began hosting the Cool Stories in Music podcast in December 2013. According to Thompson, the podcast is inspired by the biographies, stories, and chart trivia segments of the Kasem-era American Top 40 radio program.

On December 8, 2014, Thompson announced on his podcast he would be returning to morning radio in Los Angeles and that he would be doing morning drive from his home studio in North Carolina. The Mark and Lynda podcast will continue, but will be shifted later in the day and will be shorter. He also announced that Cool Stories in Music will be syndicated on Sunday on the same radio station.

Thompson began hosting a radio show, "Mark in the Morning" which started on February 2, 2015 on rival classic rock station 100.3 KSWD The Sound in Los Angeles. His on-air talent includes Andy Chanley, Gina Grad, and his daughter, Katie Thompson, as "Chick on the Street". Daniel Mizrahi is the only staff member he brought over from his time at KLOS. Thompson was eventually let go from his position due to low ratings, and exited KSWD on August 3, 2016, and plans to launch a syndicated radio program, "Cool Stories in Music."

On August 17, 2020, Thompson and Phelps were inducted into the Radio Hall of Fame.

In September 2022, Thompson released his memoir, Don't Bump the Record, Kid: My Adventures With Mark and Brian.

In 2023, Thompson began hosting his new podcast, "What You Do." His show features guests along with comedic chatter.

== Filmography ==
=== Film ===
Year	Title	Role	Notes
1990	Rocky V	Reporter	
1993	Jason Goes to Hell: The Final Friday	Officer Mark	
1997	Trekkies	Himself	
2001	The Princess Diaries	DJ Mark	
2002	Mother Ghost	Keith Bennett	
2007	Totally Baked	Secret Service Agent #2	
2008	Help	Dr. Sina	Short film
2009	Two:Thirteen	Russell Spivey	
2018	The Assassin's Code	Captain Jack O'Brian	

=== Television ===
Year	Title	Role	Notes
1988	Crime Story	Pilot #1	Episode: "Going Home"
1989	Married... with Children	Caterer	Episode: "Married... with Prom Queen: The Sequel"
1989	Stuck with Each Other	Assistant Hotel Manager	Television film
1990	Cheers	Bar Patron	Episode: "Veggie-Boyd"
1991–1992	The Adventures of Mark & Brian	Himself	13 episodes
1992	Ring of the Musketeers	TV Announcer	Television film
1993	Quantum Leap	Diner Guy	Episode: "Memphis Melody - July 3, 1954"
1993	The Adventures of Brisco County, Jr.	Mayor Dix	Episode: "Mail Order Brides"
1995	Ned and Stacey	Gary	Episode: "Threesomes"
1997	Perversions of Science	Soldier	Episode: "Boxed In"
1998	Dharma & Greg	Guy #2	Episode: "Invasion of the Buddy Snatcher"
1998	Party of Five	Announcer (voice)	Episode: "A Family Album"
1999	Odd Man Out	Himself	Episode: "Fight Club"
2002–2003	Reba	Brian	3 episodes
2004–2020	Reno 911!	Reverend Gigg LeCarp	3 episodes
2005	Danger Rangers	Monster Truck Rally Announcer (voice)	Episode: "The Great Race"
2007	Ben 10	Vance Vetteroy (voice)	Episode: "Monster Weather"
2007–2012	Phineas and Ferb	Announcer Dave, Radio DJ (voice)	3 episodes
2008	Dirt	Entertainment Anchor #2	Episode: "Dirty, Slutty Whores"
2008	MadTV	Himself	Episode: "14.1"
2008–2009	Hole in the Wall	Host	18 episodes
2010	Criminal Minds	DJ Brian	Episode: "Our Darkest Hour"
2014	Fish Hooks	Radio Announcer (voice)	Episode: "Algae Day"
2018	Black Lightning	Randy	Episode: "And Then the Devil Brought the Plague: The Book of Green Light"
2018	Star	Doctor	Episode: "Mrs. Rivera"
