= KAIA (FM) =

Air1 radio station in Los Angeles

Coordinates: 33.831°N 117.810°W

- La Mirada, California; United States
- Broadcast area: Greater Los Angeles
- Frequency: 95.9 MHz
- Branding: Air1

Programming
- Language: English
- Format: Contemporary worship music
- Network: Air1

Ownership
- Owner: Educational Media Foundation; (K-Love, Inc.)
- Sister stations: KYLA; KKLQ; KAIV

History
- First air date: April 17, 1961
- Former call signs: KEZY-FM (1960–1999); KXMX (1999–2000); KFSH-FM (2000–2025)
- Call sign meaning: "Air1 Anaheim"

Technical information
- Licensing authority: FCC
- Facility ID: 2195
- Class: A
- ERP: 6,000 watts
- HAAT: 100 meters (330 ft)

Links
- Public license information: Public file; LMS
- Webcast: Listen live
- Website: air1.com

KAIA (95.9 FM) is an noncommercial radio station that is licensed to La Mirada, California, and serves Orange County and southern Los Angeles County. The station is owned by the Educational Media Foundation (EMF). KAIA broadcasts a contemporary worship music via EMF's nationwide Air1 network.

== History ==
=== Early years ===
The station at 95.9 FM in Orange County, California has its origins in KEZY, which first signed on in 1959, at 1190 AM from its studios at the Disneyland Hotel in Anaheim with a 1,000-watt signal. The first voice heard on KEZY was that of canine TV star Lassie. Lassie's owner, Rudd Weatherwax, was an investor in the station and the hotel. It was first known as "K-Easy" as it broadcast an easy listening music format. In the late 1960s, KEZY moved its studios and offices off the Disneyland campus to a larger complex located (coincidentally) at 1190 East Ball Road in Anaheim. Accompanying the relocation was a switch to a Top 40 pop/rock format.

KEZY-FM ("96 FM KEZY") signed on April 17, 1961, with an 870-watt signal and simulcast its AM sister station. Originally, its city of license was Anaheim and its transmitter was located in Villa Park. Since its inception, the station has hosted a number of formats, including a successful Top 40 format throughout the 1980s. In 1989, Anaheim Broadcasting Corporation sold KEZY-FM and its AM counterpart, then known as KORG, to M.L. Media Partners L.P.; the new owners soon switched the format to adult contemporary. From 1993 to 1996, it was the flagship station for National Hockey League expansion team the Mighty Ducks of Anaheim. In the mid-1990s, KEZY advertised with the slogan "Hits of the '80s and '90s with no rap or hard rock, 95.9 The All New KEZY"; this was intended to attract listeners uninterested in hip-hop during its rise in popularity. Air staff during this time included John Fox (previously at KFMB-FM in San Diego), Liz Pennington, April Whitney, Carolyn Hogenred, and music director Scott Free.

Starting in 1998, KEZY-FM went through a series of ownership changes. First, Jacor Communications bought the station and its AM counterpart KORG in September for $30.1 million. Then in October, Clear Channel Communications, then the largest U.S. radio broadcasting group, purchased Jacor in a $4.4 billion deal. During this time, the station changed its call letters to KXMX, completed the construction permit for a power increase, and branded the station with its corporate "Mix" format. New on-air personalities included Angel and Randy "Ranman" DeWitt (formerly of KHTS-FM in San Diego). The Mix briefly maintained a remote studio at The Block at Orange shopping center. This format lasted only a year; it was also the last format as a secular station.

=== KFSH-FM — "95.9 The Fish" (2000–2025) ===
In 2000, as part of conditions set by the Federal Communications Commission (FCC) to approve its merger with AMFM Inc., Clear Channel sold KXMX and seven other stations to Salem Communications Corporation, a commercial radio company specializing in Christian programming. Salem changed the call letters to KFSH and flipped the station to contemporary Christian music (CCM) with the branding "The Fish" on August 25, 2000 at 6 a.m. This format has since been replicated at other Salem radio stations nationwide. KFSH relocated to the Salem Los Angeles studios in Glendale, about ten miles north of Downtown Los Angeles, sharing facilities with then-sister stations KXMX, KKLA-FM, KRLA, and KTIE. The Ball Road studios of the former KEZY in Anaheim, often referred to as "the dumpy little building on Ball Road" by morning DJ John Fox, were demolished in 2008; the land was absorbed into the neighboring Ganahl Lumber Yard. KFSH's city of license, however, remained Anaheim until November 2008, when it was changed to La Mirada, approximately five to six miles northwest, near the Los Angeles—Orange county line.

On January 16, 2012, KFSH-FM began airing the nationally syndicated program Delilah each weeknight. This marked the return of the request-and-dedication show to the Los Angeles area since it was last broadcast on KBIG. It also launched the CCM version of Delilah; the mainstream version of the program is delivered to affiliate stations in a secular adult contemporary music format. KFSH-FM dropped the show on April 16, 2020 and replaced it with Keep the Faith with Penny, originating from sister station WFSH-FM in Atlanta.

In early 2018, KFSH-FM began RDS broadcasting, providing song artists and titles on capable devices.

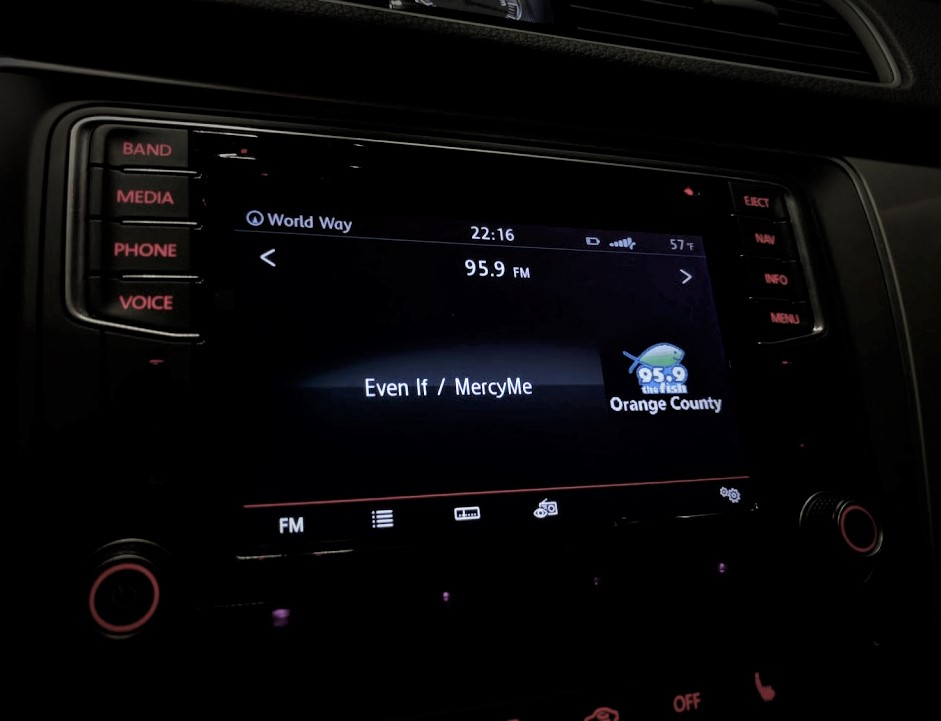
KFSH-FM activated its RDS system in early 2018, as seen here

=== KAIA — "Air1" (2025–present) ===
On December 30, 2024, Salem Media Group announced the sale of KFSH and six other Christian AC stations to Educational Media Foundation for $80 million in order to pay off the company’s debt. A few weeks later, it was announced that the station would begin airing the nationwide Air1 Christian worship network.

On February 1, 2025, KFSH-FM officially went off the air as "95.9 The Fish" after playing "Awesome God" by Rich Mullins. The call sign was changed to KAIA and the station now airs EMF's Air1 network.

== Transmission issues ==
KAIA is classified as being in the Los Angeles radio market and previously was marketed as such. However, the station's 6,000-watt signal can be heard clearly only in Orange County, its primary service area for most of its history, and south of Downtown Los Angeles. Generally, the stereo signal is unable to be received in northern Los Angeles County, including the San Fernando Valley. This is due to interference from KCAQ, a Class B1 station in Camarillo that operates on the same frequency and to which KAIA is short spaced. The cities that both stations are licensed to serve are 63 miles (101 km) apart, but under FCC rules, the minimum distance between Class A and Class B1 stations operating on the same channel is 89 miles (143 km).

== FishFest ==
From 2002-2024, KFSH-FM hosted FishFest, an annual contemporary Christian music festival held in early summer. Through 2016, the concert was held at the Irvine Meadows Amphitheatre in Irvine, California. With the closure of the venue in October 2016, the 2017 edition of FishFest was relocated to Honda Center.

Date	Venue	City	Lineup
March 26, 2006	Verizon Wireless Amphitheatre	Irvine, California	Newsboys, Jeremy Camp, Chris Tomlin, John Tesh, Delirious?, Natalie Grant, Jana Alayra, Piller, Hawk Nelson, Project 86
July 28, 2007	Verizon Wireless Amphitheatre	Irvine, California	Third Day, MercyMe, Chris Tomlin, Kutless, Jessie Daniels, Aaron Shust
June 25, 2011	Verizon Wireless Amphitheatre	Irvine, California	MercyMe, Third Day, David Crowd Band, Tenth Avenue North, The O.C. Supertones, John Mark McMillian, Jake Hamilton, Jamie Grace, Jana Alayra
June 23, 2012	Verizon Wireless Amphitheatre	Irvine, California	TobyMac, Sanctus Real, Mikeschair, Chris August, Lincoln Brewster, Phil Wickham, Five Iron Frenzy, Trip Lee, Pawnshop Kings, Press Play, Travis Ryan, Moriah Peters
