= Brian Phelps =

American radio personality and actor

- Born: Brian Wayne Phelps; May 5, 1959 (age 67); Cambridge, Illinois
- Occupations: Radio personality, actor

Brian Wayne Phelps (born May 5, 1959) is an American radio personality (disc jockey) and occasional actor, best known for the nationally syndicated Mark & Brian morning show.

Phelps began his acting career at Cambridge High School in Cambridge, Illinois, and appeared in the school's musicals, as well as being a member of the Cambridge Vikings football team. After graduating in 1977, Phelps attended college in Normal, Illinois. After attending Illinois State University, Phelps did commercial work and improvisational comedy before meeting his partner Mark Thompson in Birmingham, Alabama in 1986. The next year the duo moved their show to KLOS-FM in Los Angeles.

The enormous popularity of his radio show has given Phelps several opportunities to branch out into other entertainment media. In 1991–92, he and Thompson hosted a short-lived NBC TV series, The Adventures of Mark & Brian, based on their radio show. Phelps has also appeared in several motion pictures, notably Jason Goes to Hell: The Final Friday (the 1993 ninth installment in the Friday the 13th series) and The Princess Diaries (2001). He has also made numerous TV series guest appearances, including the role of Reverend Gigg LeCarp on the Comedy Central series Reno 911!. Phelps often ended the Mark & Brian Show with the catch phrase "Be good humans!".

On August 17, 2012, after 25 years as the KLOS morning team, Phelps and Thompson signed off the air waves and closed their show. Phelps debuted the podcast "The Brian and Jill Show" on September 10, 2012 with his new partner, actress Jill Whelan.

On August 17, 2020, Phelps and Thompson were inducted into the Radio Hall of Fame.

On June 14, 2024, Phelps debuted the podcast "Be Good Humans" with his new partner, television showrunner Trey Callaway.

== Filmography ==
=== Film ===
Year	Title	Role	Notes
1990	Rocky V	Reporter	
1993	Jason Goes to Hell: The Final Friday	Officer Brian	
1997	Trekkies	Himself	
2001	The Princess Diaries	DJ Brian	
2007	Totally Baked	Secret Service Agent #2	

=== Television ===
Year	Title	Role	Notes
1989	Married... with Children	Caterer	Episode: "Married... with Prom Queen: The Sequel"
1990	Cheers	Bar Patron	Episode: "Veggie-Boyd"
1991–1992	The Adventures of Mark & Brian	Himself	13 episodes
1993	The Adventures of Brisco County, Jr.	Lightning Ed	Episode: "Mail Order Brides"
1995	Ned and Stacey	Earl	Episode: "Threesomes"
1997	Perversions of Science	Soldier	Episode: "Boxed In"
1998	Dharma & Greg	Guy #3	Episode: "Invasion of the Buddy Snatcher"
1999	Odd Man Out	Himself	Episode: "Fight Club"
2004–2020	Reno 911!	Reverend Gigg LeCarp	3 episodes
2007–2010	Phineas and Ferb	Announcer Rick/Paul's Dad	4 episodes
2010	Criminal Minds	DJ Brian	Episode: "Our Darkest Hour"
2017	Take It from the Top	Brian	Television film
