= KGBN =

- Anaheim, California; United States
- Broadcast area: Orange County, California; Greater Los Angeles
- Frequency: 1190 kHz

Programming
- Language: Korean
- Format: Christian radio

Ownership
- Owner: Korean Gospel Broadcasting Network

History
- First air date: May 18, 1959
- Former call signs: KEZY, KNWZ, KPZE, KORG, KXMX
- Call sign meaning: Korean Gospel Broadcasting Network

Technical information
- Licensing authority: FCC
- Facility ID: 2194
- Class: B
- Power: 20,000 watts (day); 1,300 watts (night)
- Transmitter coordinates: 33°56′42″N 117°51′47.2″W

Links
- Public license information: Public file; LMS
- Webcast: Listen live
- Website: kgbc.com

KGBN (1190 AM) is a radio station licensed to Anaheim, California, United States, and serves Orange County and Greater Los Angeles. Owned by the Korean Gospel Broadcasting Network, which is controlled by president Rev. Young Sun Lee, it carries a Korean Christian brokered time format. KGBN is one of four radio stations in the Los Angeles area that broadcast entirely in Korean; the others are KYPA, KMPC and KFOX in Torrance, although they have mostly secular formats.

KGBN's transmitter is sited near the Orange Freeway (California State Route 57) in Brea, California.

== History ==
=== KEZY ===
The station signed on May 18, 1959, as KEZY, an easy listening station known as "K-Easy". However, during construction and prior to its on-air debut, it was legally known by the callsign KDOG. The first voice heard over the 1,000-watt signal was that of K-9 TV star Lassie. Lassie's owner, Rudd Weatherwax, was an investor in both the station and the Disneyland Hotel where its studios were located. In the late 1960s, KEZY became an Orange County Top 40 powerhouse featuring such disc jockeys as Mark Denis and Mike Wagner. Accompanying the format flip was a move off the Disneyland campus to a larger facility at 1190 East Ball Road in Anaheim, an address corresponding to the station's frequency.

In the late 1970s, programmer Dave Foreman dropped top-40 in favor of an album-oriented rock format. The slogan was "The New 1190 KEZY, Anaheim's Kickass Rock 'N' Roll!", which contrasted with KEZY-FM's AC format. After a few years the station once again changed formats, first to news (as KNWZ), then to an adult rock format known simply as "12" ("KEZY Anaheim is 12.") This format was abandoned in the early 1980s and it become a highly successful Top 40/CHR format from 1980 to 1988.

=== 1980s ===
Around 1984, KEZY changed its call sign to KPZE (K-Praise). It featured a blend of Christian teaching–preaching programs, contemporary Christian music, and live broadcasts of the games of the Long Beach State and Notre Dame football programs. The program director was Bill Gutelman, and the operations director was Gil Perez. Other staff–air personality included Pam Sanchez (mornings-air name Stephanie Rose), Paul Walkewicz (weekends), Bill Smith (weekends), Liz Altamirano, and former KYMS personality Bob Turnbull. Turnbull hosted an evening program called "Ministry And More," similar to his "Music and More" program on KYMS. In addition to playing music, he would have "Thoughts To End A Busy Day," and book reviews.

From 1986 to late 1988, operations manager and air personality Robin Keith hosted an afternoon drive talk show called "Drivetime 1190" along with co-host Steve DeSaeger. The show featured talk and call-ins, comedy, frequent traffic, news and weather reports as well as interviews with celebrities and experts. Ollie Collins, Jr., of KTYM Inglewood, brokered most of the Sunday hours on KPZE. The morning consisted of a Gospel music show hosted by Collins. Most of the afternoon programs were recorded church services. A good majority of the commercials used his voice. Al Gross (formerly of KBRT AM 740), eventually hosted the morning show. His was mostly talk. He even joked one morning at 6:00 AM sign-on, as the previous program was ending with its closing theme, "The Air That I Breathe" by The Hollies, "KPZE, Anaheim, playing more music than any other talk station."

Around 1988, the callsign was changed to KORG (K-Orange). It broadcast a few games of the Los Angeles Kings hockey team during conflicts with KLAC, the Kings' flagship station at the time. In fact, in one of those games (October 15, 1989), Wayne Gretzky established the National Hockey League's all-time point-scoring record. In 1987 and '88, KORG was an affiliate of RTV Sports, one of the first all-sports radio networks in America. Steve DeSaeger provided local sports updates during RTV programs, which aired seven nights a week.

=== 1990s ===
In the mid-1990s, Anaheim Broadcasting, a local company that had been the owner, sold the station to Jacor, which later merged with Clear Channel Communications. In 1997, Clear Channel sold KXMX to the Salem Media Group because it had exceeded the Federal Communications Commission limit as to how many stations it could own in the greater Los Angeles market. (Anaheim is still in business as the owners of FM stations KOLA and KCAL-FM in the Inland Empire.)

Salem is the nation's largest owner of commercial religious stations. It owned 1190 AM until 2010, as a sister station to 870 KRLA, 99.5 KKLA-FM and 95.9 KFSH-FM.

=== 2000s ===
The KXMX call sign was derived from KXMX-FM, originally 95.9 KEZY-FM. When that outlet became Contemporary Christian music station KFSH The Fish in 2001, the call letters were reassigned to 1190 AM. Today, the KEZY call sign can be found on 1240 AM in San Bernardino, California under separate ownership. As KXMX, it aired shows in a variety of languages, including Spanish, Chinese, Korean, Japanese, Thai, Vietnamese, and Tagalog.

=== 2010s ===
In August 2010, the station was sold to the Korean Gospel Broadcasting Network, which switched the format to Korean-language Christian radio programming. On March 29, 2011, KXMX changed its callsign to KGBN.

On April 16, 2017, Rev. Young Sun Lee became president of KGBN AM 1190.
