= KKLQ (FM) =

K-Love Christian radio station in Los Angeles

- Los Angeles, California; United States
- Broadcast area: Greater Los Angeles
- Frequency: 100.3 MHz (HD Radio)
- Branding: Positive, Encouraging 100.3

Programming
- Language: English
- Format: Christian contemporary
- Subchannels: HD2: Air1; HD3: Radio Nueva Vida
- Network: K-Love

Ownership
- Owner: Educational Media Foundation; (K-Love, Inc.)
- Sister stations: KAIA; KYLA; KAIV

History
- First air date: July 1957
- Former call signs: KMLA (1957–1965); KVXN (1965); KFOX-FM (1965–1972); KIQQ (1972–1989); KQLZ (1989–1993); KXEZ (1993–1996); KIBB (1996–1997); KCMG (1997–2001); KKBT (2001–2006); KRBV (2006–2008); KSWD (2008–2017)
- Call sign meaning: K-Love

Technical information
- Licensing authority: FCC
- Facility ID: 70038
- Class: B
- ERP: 5,400 watts
- HAAT: 889.0 meters (2,916.7 ft)
- Transmitter coordinates: 34.2264°N 118.0670°W
- Translators: HD2: 91.1 K216EM (Arcadia); HD2: 91.9 K220HC (Studio City); HD2: 92.7 K224EY (San Marino); HD2: 100.7 K264AF (Guasti)
- Repeaters: 100.3 KKLQ-FM2 (Santa Clarita); 104.1 KKLM (FM) (Murrieta); 91.1 KKLP (FM) (Perris)

Links
- Public license information: Public file; LMS
- Webcast: Listen live
- Website: klove.com

KKLQ (100.3 FM, "Positive, Encouraging 100.3") is a non-commercial radio station licensed to Los Angeles, California, United States, and serves Greater Los Angeles. Owned by the Educational Media Foundation (EMF), KKLQ carries programming from the K-Love network with a transmitter sited atop Mount Wilson. The station's signal is extended by a booster in Santa Clarita, KKLQ-FM2 at 100.3 MHz, into the Santa Clarita Valley and other areas north of Los Angeles. Along with its translators, the station's signal is also extended to the Inland Empire by KKLP in Perris, along with KKLM (FM) in Murrieta. However both stations have their separate top of the hour IDs, mostly due to localization purposes.

From 2008 to 2017, the station broadcast a classic rock format (though it initially aired an adult album alternative format) under the brand 100.3 The Sound as KSWD. In 2017, station owner Entercom announced its merger with CBS Radio. In order to satisfy Federal Communications Commission (FCC) ownership caps, Entercom retained CBS Radio's pre-existing Los Angeles cluster but divested KSWD to EMF, who assumed control of the station on November 16, 2017, and flipped it to K-Love programming. The former broadcast studios of The Sound were located on Wilshire Boulevard in the Miracle Mile district of Los Angeles.

KKLQ is not affiliated with KLVE, a Spanish-language radio station which has used the name "K-Love" in the Los Angeles market continuously since 1974 and holds the trademark locally. Prior to assuming control of KKLQ, EMF reached an agreement with Univision Radio (now known as Uforia Audio Network), owner of KLVE, that allows KKLQ to use the K-Love brand on-air as part of networked content, but requires local promotion to disambiguate itself from KLVE.

== History ==
=== Early years ===
100.3 FM in Los Angeles signed on as KMLA at 8 a.m. on July 1, 1957. The station broadcast good music and news, with no more than two commercials per half-hour. (KMLA is now a Regional Mexican-formatted station in El Rio, California, serving the Oxnard-Ventura radio market.)

The KMLA Broadcasting Corporation, the original owner of the station, filed to sell it to KFOX, Inc., owner of KFOX (1280 AM) in Long Beach, in November 1964. The station changed its call letters to KVXN in January and again in April, after the sale was completed, to KFOX-FM, at which time it began simulcasting KFOX's country music format.

=== KIQQ ===
In 1972, KFOX, Inc. traded its two Los Angeles stations and $3.45 million to the Industrial Broadcasting Company in exchange for KIKK AM and -FM in Pasadena, Texas, near Houston. Industrial then split the KFOX stations apart; the AM went to the John Walton group, while KFOX-FM was sold to Cosmic Communications. The new ownership changed the FM station's call letters to KIQQ ("K-100") in an attempt to capitalize on its frequency of 100.3 MHz. The following year, with the station's soft rock format failing to gain ratings or billing, KIQQ brought in deposed KHJ heavyweights Bill Drake and Gene Chenault, who contracted to program and manage the station. In spite of bringing in former KHJ powerhouse jocks, including Robert W. Morgan and The Real Don Steele, certain management and programming decisions are believed to have led to the demise of Drake-Chenault's run at KIQQ. By 1975, Morgan and Steele were gone. Ultimately, the station cut costs drastically by airing a generic national format via satellite.

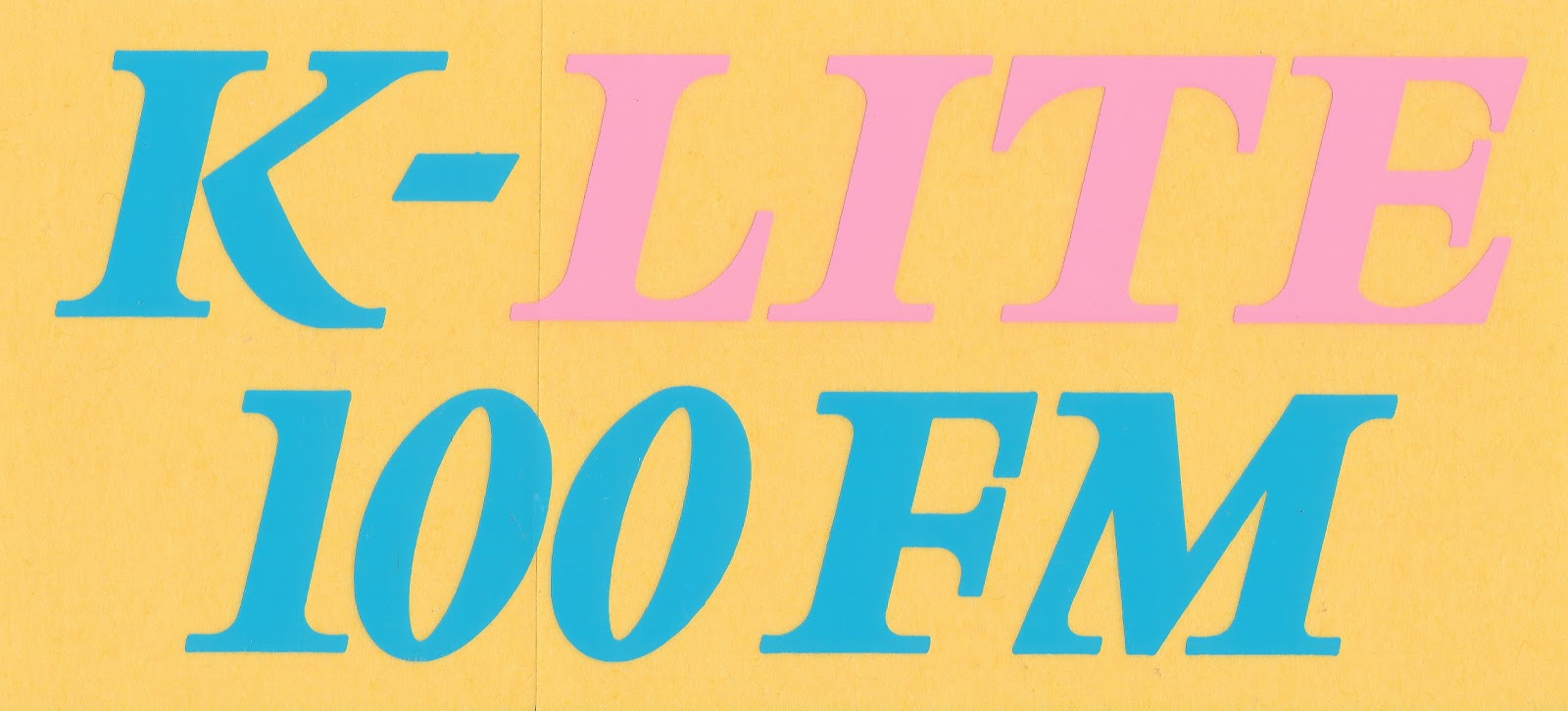
Station logo as "K-Lite 100"

In the early 1980s, the station dropped its K-100 handle and kept to the calls as "KIQQ" with a live and local aggressive top-40 or contemporary hit radio (CHR) format. The on-air lineup included Jeff Thomas, G.W. McCoy (engaged to actress Heather Locklear for a time), and Francesca Cappucci. "Play Hits for Cash" was a regular promotion. KIQQ simulcast the NBC television show Friday Night Videos and even had Wally George as a weekend call-in host. KIQQ also carried American Top 40 beginning in 1983 after competing CHR station KIIS-FM lost the countdown program over the playing of network commercials; this move forced KIIS-FM to create its own chart show, Rick Dees Weekly Top 40.

By the mid-1980s, CHR competition from KIIS-FM, KKHR, and KBZT proved too intense for KIQQ; KIIS-FM alone had a 10 share in the Arbitron book. On July 29, 1985, KIQQ flipped to a satellite-delivered adult contemporary format as "100.3 K-Lite". The format lasted for four years before the launch of another new format.

The callsign KIQQ-FM is now on a regional Mexican music station in Newberry Springs, California.

=== KQLZ — Pirate Radio 100.3 FM ===
In November 1988, Outlet Communications sold KIQQ to Westwood One for $56 million. The sale closed March 17, 1989, at midnight Pacific Time, and KIQQ officially signed off at 5 a.m. after playing its final song, "(At) The End (Of A Rainbow)" by Earl Grant. The sign off announcement of KIQQ was read by Scott Shannon. KQLZ—branding as Pirate Radio—launched with the Guns N' Roses song "Welcome to the Jungle", adopting the title as its slogan. Pirate Radio broadcast with no commercial interruptions for its first few days, adding one or two advertisements per hour thereafter.

Pirate Radio started as a "Rock 40" station that played hard rock and heavy metal music mixed with upbeat pop music and some alternative rock in a manner similar to mainstream top 40 stations. At first, KQLZ featured an eclectic range of music and proudly proclaimed it played everything from Madonna to Metallica to Milli Vanilli. A typical hour of music on Pirate Radio in the spring of 1989 could include early crossover hip hop artist Tone Lōc, electronic music from Depeche Mode, a pop music ballad by Martika, a pop rock song by The Bangles, and satirical punk rock by the Dead Milkmen, all mixed with music from such rock acts as Iron Maiden, Billy Squier, and Winger.

The station was programmed by Scott Shannon, known within the radio business for his work at WHTZ (Z100) in New York City in the 1980s. Shannon left Z100 and moved to Los Angeles to compete against top-rated station KIIS-FM, as well as top 40 crossover outlet KPWR (Power 106). He developed the Pirate Radio concept while launching WHTZ, drawing inspiration from British pirate radio station Radio Caroline. A later account from WMMS program director John Gorman (both WHTZ and WMMS then, and now, are under common ownership) claimed that Shannon wanted to brand WHTZ as Pirate Radio when it launched, but was rebuffed by ownership who wanted WHTZ to be seen as a legitimate radio station; Z100 was his second choice. In addition to Shannon hosting KQLZ's morning drive program, other on-air personalities from the Rock 40 era included Shadow Steele in afternoon drive and Jimmy Page, formerly of KCAQ in Oxnard, in late nights. Westwood One paid Shannon a yearly salary of $2.3 million, then an industry high.

The original Pirate Radio billboards featured a close-up head shot of Shannon's face. Some of these billboards were soon defaced with "El Diablo" in spray paint. Local news media reported that some members of the area's Chicano, Hispanic, and Latino communities viewed Shannon's picture as a caricature of the devil. Some media sources reported that the acts of vandalism were done intentionally by the radio station to generate free publicity. In 1990, the station adopted as its mascot the "Party Pig", a cartoon pig wearing a trucker hat. This figure replaced Shannon's likeness on billboards and appeared on other promotional items such as T-shirts and bumper stickers.

One popular feature during KQLZ's first few months was "Flush and Win". The station invited listeners to call in and mention the Los Angeles-area radio station to which they listened before KQLZ signed on. After saying the competing station's moniker or call letters, the sound of a toilet flushing could be heard; this was meant to insinuate that the listener dumped one's former station and switched to Pirate Radio.

Along with its local 100.3 FM broadcast in Los Angeles, KQLZ could also be heard via satellite transmission (SatCom 1R, transponder 3, channels 5 and 6). This service was used primarily for the delivery of the syndicated program Pirate Radio U.S.A. to affiliates, but it also gave the station wide exposure outside of the local market. Employees of several radio stations around the country listened to and airchecked KQLZ's satellite signal. In 1989, Westwood One had planned to launch a 24-hour satellite version of Pirate Radio; however, a company representative stated that the debut of such a network was unlikely.

After briefly registering successful ratings during its first six months as Pirate Radio, KQLZ soon garnered ratings too low to bill advertising rates high enough to sustain operating costs. By late 1989, the station focused more on hard rock and heavy metal music (mostly metal in the more pop oriented glam metal genre), putting it in direct competition with metal station KNAC and album rock outlet KLOS. Shannon and most of the original on-air personalities were dismissed on February 13, 1991; the next day, the station switched to a conventional album rock format, dropping pop and dance music. The following month, Westwood One hired former KLOS program director Carey Curelop for the same position at KQLZ.

KQLZ dropped the Pirate Radio name on December 28, 1992 and adjusted its format to a hybrid of album rock and modern rock. The station from this point forward was known as simply 100.3 FM with the slogan "Southern California's Cutting Edge".

The Pirate Radio U.S.A. syndicated program, which Shadow Steele had hosted until 1991 and which was thereafter helmed by several others, ceased broadcasting in October 1993.

On April 1, 1994, as an April Fools' Day radio stunt, Los Angeles modern rock station KROQ-FM switched to KQLZ's "Rock 40" format, complete with original Pirate Radio bumpers, station legal IDs, airchecks, and playlists. Shadow Steele returned to the airwaves for the event, broadcasting live from the KROQ-FM studio.

In 2008, the KQLZ call letters were used for several years on a radio station in the Boise, Idaho, market that was an affiliate of the satellite-delivered True Oldies Channel, a later Scott Shannon project.

Since 2013, the KQLZ calls have been attached to a classic rock station serving Dickinson, North Dakota.

=== KXEZ — EZ 100.3 ===
On March 29, 1993, Westwood One announced the sale of KQLZ to Viacom for $40 million, significantly less than what the company had purchased the station for in 1989; this marked the end of its brief stint in radio station ownership. Four days later, on April 2 at 3 p.m., 100.3 FM flipped to soft adult contemporary with new call letters KXEZ, and adopted the EZ 100.3 branding. Shannon, on the phone from WPLJ in New York, returned to the station's airwaves briefly to give KQLZ a proper send-off, closing out the old format saying, "Goodbye, Pirate Radio".

It was a return to the dial for the KXEZ call letters and format, which had resided at 98.7 MHz until that station re-branded as KYSR, "Star 98.7", in 1992. It was during this period that the station hired prostitute Divine Brown to be their television spokesperson soon after her arrest with actor Hugh Grant.

Today, KXEZ is a classic country station near Dallas, Texas.

=== KIBB — B100 ===
On August 29, 1996, at noon, KXEZ changed calls to KIBB and flipped to a dance-leaning rhythmic hot AC format, branded as "B100" ("The Rhythm of L.A."). The first song on KIBB was "You Dropped a Bomb on Me" by The Gap Band. The move was to go after listeners who had become disenfranchised with the increasing hip-hop content at KPWR. The move also came about based on the instant success of WKTU in New York City, which debuted in February of that year. In 1997, Chancellor Media bought KIBB, added current songs to its playlist, and shifted directions to rhythmic contemporary hits. The slogan changed to "L.A.'s Hot FM".

The KIBB call sign was assigned to an adult hits station serving Wichita, Kansas, until May 2023, when it rebranded as Bob FM and took on the KBOB-FM call sign.

=== KCMG — Mega 100 ===
Despite the effort and a promotional campaign (one memorable ad featured a large billboard of a Latina woman dancing placed near a building on Broadway in Downtown Los Angeles), KIBB couldn't make a dent in the ratings. After a little over a year and minor tweaks in its playlist and direction, KIBB's fate was sealed when Chancellor decided to drop the format at 5 p.m. on November 19, 1997 (after a couple of days of teasing a "major event" and playing "I'll Be Missing You" by Puff Daddy as the final song) for yet another short-lived fad: Rhythmic oldies as Mega 100. The first song on "Mega" was "The Cisco Kid" by War. The call letters were changed to KCMG on January 30, 1998. The format, which drew instant ratings success in the market, was replicated on many stations across the country in the late 1990s (however, many of these stations would flip in the early 2000s due to poor ratings and promotion). Chancellor merged with Capstar in 1999, forming AMFM Inc.

=== KKBT — 100.3 The Beat ===
Clear Channel Communications merged with AMFM in 2000. Because of the merger, Clear Channel exceeded the radio station ownership limits (5 FM stations, 3 AM stations) in Los Angeles. As a result, Clear Channel decided to keep the stronger 92.3 FM frequency, as well as KCMG's intellectual property and call letters, and chose to sell the 100.3 FM frequency and the intellectual property of KKBT, which was on 92.3, to Radio One.

When the switch was made on June 30, 2000 at 5 p.m., 100.3 FM became KKBT, "100.3 The Beat", and 92.3 became KCMG, "Mega 92.3". (In August 2001, as the "Jammin' Oldies" format was starting to fade in popularity, KCMG would morph into an urban adult contemporary direction and the station became KHHT, "Hot 92.3", a direct competitor to KKBT.) Soon after the frequency swap, KKBT released their morning team of Dre and Ed Lover, as well as afternoon drivers "The Baka Boyz".

During the first four years under Radio One, KKBT enjoyed modest success as it battled KPWR for the R&B/hip-hop crown. KKBT heavily promoted Steve Harvey as its high-profile morning star and billed itself under the slogan of "Harvey & Hip-Hop". However, KKBT never overtook KPWR in the ratings. Harvey was also at odds with station management over the station's hip-hop content and refused to play questionable songs during his show until his departure from the station, when he went to KDAY.

By 2004, the station began showing signs of erosion in ratings, as it faced new competition. KDAY, which was formerly on 1580 AM, signed on for the first time on FM at 93.5 and debuted its own hip-hop format that September, siphoning off a good number of KKBT listeners. In addition, KXOL-FM's flip to Reggaeton in 2005 took many of The Beat's Hispanic listeners. KKBT went through a great deal of turmoil, with several popular air staffers leaving or being dismissed from 2002 through 2006.

On May 19, 2006, at Midnight, KKBT officially threw in the towel as a mainstream urban outlet and flipped to a hybrid urban adult contemporary/urban talk format dubbed "Rhythm & Talk". According to the press release that was featured on the station's website: "The new format, which will engage 25- to 49-year-old adults, takes the best music of urban adult contemporary stations and adds compelling content delivered by proven national personalities Tom Joyner, Ananda Lewis, Michael Baisden, Wendy Williams and Free." Although it retained the "Beat" branding, the peace sign, which was long a staple of "The Beat" in station logos, was discontinued.

However, the 'Rhythm and Talk' emphasis did not succeed in the ratings, and the station dropped Free and Lewis first from the lineup. Williams, which aired on tape delay after midnight on weekends, was dropped later, and the Tom Joyner Morning Show was dropped when it could not compete with Steve Harvey on KDAY. Other on-air staffers also left the station, but Baisden remained until the station's format flip in April 2008. Baisden later landed on KDAY, before being dropped by the station in July 2009.

KKBT was the last full-market hip hop/R&B station to use the Urban format as opposed to Rhythmic, not to mention the only one that covered the entire metro. However, much of its target audience tuned to other stations: Hispanics preferred KPWR and KXOL-FM; African Americans had KHHT, KJLH, and to a lesser extent, KTWV as options; in the meantime, KMVN debuted and targeted older listeners with dance pop from the 1980s to the present day. With that, ratings suffered and speculation grew about its future. Emmis Broadcasting reportedly was interested in the station, but decided not to buy it. Eventually, KKBT elected to go head-to-head with the urban AC formats of KHHT and long-time Compton-based KJLH. The station also hired Cliff Winston away from KJLH for afternoon drive.

As of 2019, the KKBT call sign has resurfaced at an urban contemporary station in Leone, American Samoa, also branded as "The Beat."

=== KRBV — V 100.3 ===
In October 2006, the station began phasing out the "Beat" branding and promos would only reference the 100.3 frequency, and in December 2006, briefly touted "Majic", giving rise to speculation that Radio One would use the "Majic" brand, most notably found on sister stations WMMJ in Washington, DC, WWIN-FM in Baltimore (instead spelled "Magic"), and KMJQ in Houston.

However, on December 29, 2006, at 8 a.m., Radio One instead unveiled V 100.3, and changed the station's calls to KRBV. With that, an Urban heritage based era came to an end: the KKBT call-sign was no more after 16 years, and the "Beat" branding was erased as a piece of radio brand history, as KKBT was the very first radio station to carry the "Beat" moniker (although KDAY briefly revived the branding soon after). (The KRBV calls and "V 100.3" moniker were both used on an urban AC station, what is now KJKK, in the Dallas–Fort Worth metroplex in the mid- to late 1990s.) The imaging was similar in fashion to WRKS in New York City, perhaps a reason being that Barry Mayo, the former general manager for WRKS, was consulting Radio One and thus wanted to use similar imaging for KRBV.

The re-imaging and air-staff changes did not help the station's ratings, however. At a stockholders' meeting in 2007, some investors called for KRBV to be sold, but company officials said that they had no such plans. One possible reason for this is that KRBV was the only Radio One-owned-and-operated station in the three leading markets in the U.S.; at the time, they did not own stations in New York City or Chicago. Also, a sale of KRBV would come at a loss to Radio One compared to how much it originally paid for it, possibly because of the residual effects of the frequency swap with KCMG.

On March 24, 2008, Radio One announced that the station had been sold to Bonneville International for $137.5 million. The transaction closed in the second quarter of 2008. According to a spokesperson for Bonneville, the station would continue to be a music station, although there were rumors that the station would actually flip to news/talk (similar to sister stations KTAR-FM in Phoenix, KIRO-FM in Seattle, and WWWT in Washington, D.C.). On April 3, Bonneville confirmed it would flip the station to adult album alternative (AAA). KRBV's air staffers bid farewell to their listeners on their final day, April 7.

=== KSWD — 100.3 The Sound ===
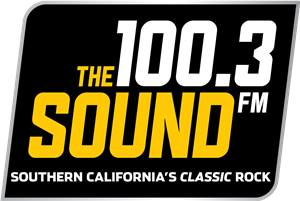
Final logo used as "The Sound".

On April 8, 2008, at Midnight, Bonneville took over the operations of KRBV, and dropped the station's urban AC format. The station then began stunting as Bruce Radio 100.3, playing all of Bruce Springsteen's hits in connection with his show that night at the Honda Center in Anaheim. After ten hours of playing "the Boss", followed by the song "I Love L.A." by Randy Newman, KRBV made the following announcement: "Hello, and welcome to what we hope will be a new beginning for Southern California and music fans everywhere." The station then became "100.3 The Sound" and the AAA format officially launched, with "Beautiful Day" by U2 being the first song played.

The new station offered listeners a wide selection of rock music, stretching from the 1960s to "last week", according to Bonneville vice president of programming Greg Solk and executive VP Drew Horowitz. In an interview from R&R the day of the launch, Bonneville president and chief executive officer Bruce Reese told the music trade publication, "It’s great to be back in L.A." He added that, "we are truly excited about our new station — 100.3 the Sound will be a music station that has absolute respect for the music and that features a broad playlist".

On May 14, 2008, new call letters KSWD were officially introduced. The rights to these call letters had to be purchased from an FM station in Seward, Alaska, who then switched to the call sign KKNI-FM.

KSWD's new format and the "Sound" logo were loosely patterned after its then-sister station in Cincinnati, WSWD. But whereas KSWD's direction took a broader approach, WSWD focused mostly on 1990s and current fare (WSWD switched to a different format in 2009). KSWD was the fourth station in the Los Angeles radio market to program a Triple-A format; KNX-FM, KSCA and KACD/KBCD all have featured the format in past years. The last of those stations also used the positioning statement "World Class Rock for Southern California."

In May 2009, KSWD dropped current music and shifted to classic rock, although its playlist included many more deep album tracks than their nearest competitors, KLOS and KCBS-FM. As a result, KSWD was pulled off of Mediabase's AAA reporting stations panel. Rival KLOS had already switched back to a harder-edged version of the same format.

On July 10, 2009, KSWD held "Finally a KMET Friday", an on-air event paying tribute to the defunct, pioneering Los Angeles rock station KMET. The event featured on-air appearances by former KMET personalities, classic jingles, and much of the music programming from the era, including an airing of Bob Marley & The Wailers's "Live at the Roxy" concert. The event was spearheaded by KSWD personality Jeff Gonzer, who was an alumnus of KMET; the station's program director Dave Beasing stated that public response to the event was "absolutely overwhelming and proof of the emotional connection that a generation of Southern Californians had with KMET". In 2013, KSWD held a second edition of the event, the "Mighty Met Weekend", from November 1 to November 3, 2013.

On December 8, 2014, KSWD general manager Peter Burton and program director Dave Beasing announced that Mark Thompson would replace Joe Benson in morning drive at KSWD. Benson would move to mid-days and current midday host Andy Chanley would become part of Thompson's show. Thompson hosted his last show on KSWD on August 3, 2016, after which Chanley took his place as morning host. From 1987 to 2012, Thompson co-hosted the morning show on KLOS with Brian Phelps.

On July 14, 2015, it was announced that Entercom would swap four of its stations in Denver to Bonneville in exchange for KSWD, to comply with ownership limits related to Entercom's acquisition of Lincoln Financial Media's radio stations. Once the purchase was completed on July 17, Entercom began operating KSWD under a time-brokerage agreement, marking the company's entry into the Los Angeles market for the first time, while Bonneville began operating their new cluster in Denver that same day. The swap to Entercom was consummated on November 24, 2015.

On May 21, 2016, LARadio.com announced that the recently rechristened Los Angeles Rams of the National Football League would air live games on KSWD, alongside AM station KSPN.

=== KKLQ — Positive, Encouraging 100.3 ===
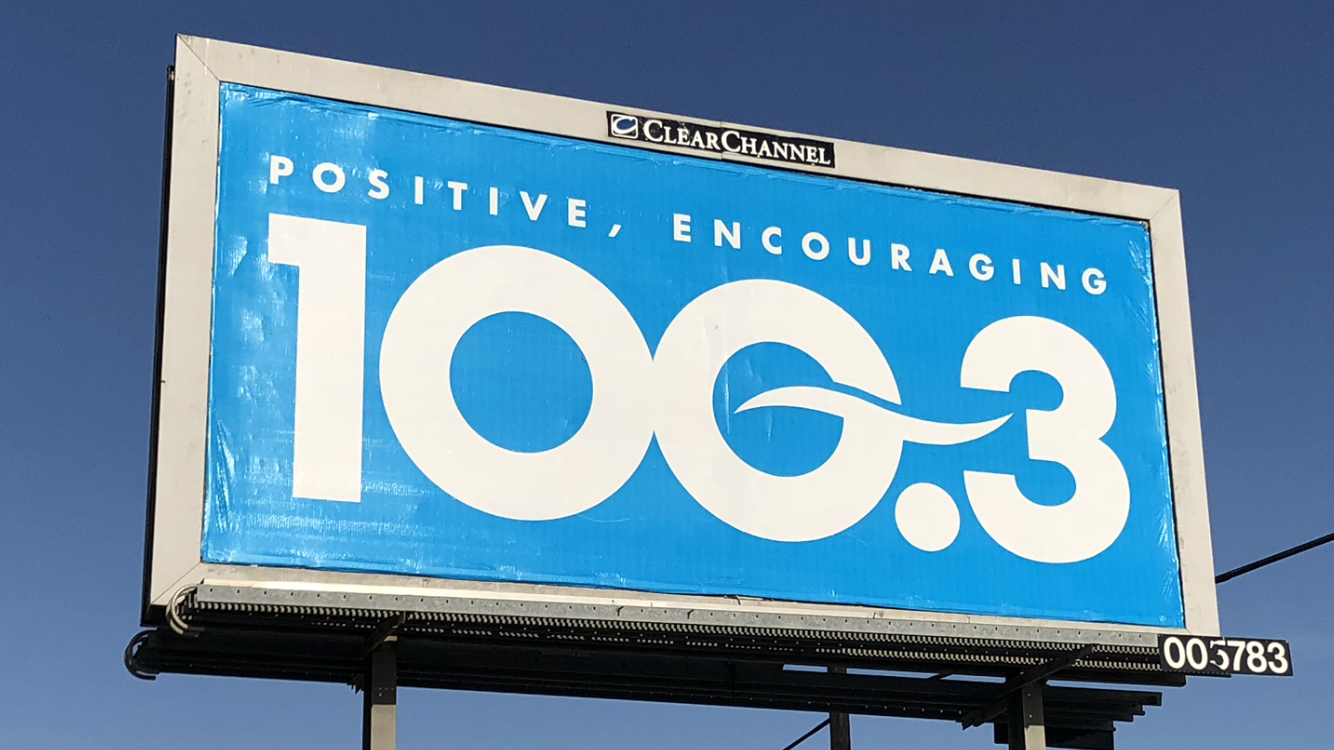
A billboard advertising KKLQ; absent from this ad is the "K-Love" name; this is to prevent confusion with KLVE, which has used the K-Love brand locally since the 1970s.

On February 2, 2017, Entercom announced its intent to merge with CBS Radio. The company was required to divest stations in order to comply with ownership limits, and on September 26, 2017, the company announced that it would divest KSWD, KSOQ-FM, and WGGI to Educational Media Foundation (EMF) for $57,750,000. KSWD was to be flipped to a contemporary Christian music format as part of EMF's K-Love network. The sale of the three stations to EMF was approved on November 2.

Once the station was scheduled to switch to K-Love on November 16, 2017, it was also announced that Los Angeles Rams FM radio broadcasts would move to KCBS-FM, beginning with the team's next game on November 19. As the station's final songs as a rock station, morning co-host Andy Chanley played the side-two medley of The Beatles' Abbey Road, concluding with "The End". Shortly after a final sign-off by Chanley, KSWD switched to K-Love at 1:00 p.m. At the same time as the flip, the station adopted the KKLQ call letters; the KSWD call letters were moved to KMPS, an Entercom-acquired station in Seattle that flipped to a soft AC format and branded itself as The Sound (which in this case, referred to the Puget Sound).

EMF was required to reach an agreement with Univision Radio (later known as Uforia Audio Network) in order to use the "K-Love" brand in the Los Angeles market. KLVE, a Univision-owned Spanish-language AC outlet, has used the name K-Love continuously since 1974, and holds trademark rights to that brand locally. (Note: In California, Univision Radio, Inc.'s registration of the "K-Love" trademark is restricted to the following counties: Los Angeles, Orange, Ventura, Inyo, western portions of San Bernardino, San Diego, eastern portions of Kern, and western portions of Riverside. Educational Media Foundation owns the same trademark in the remainder of the state outside of the aforementioned areas.) While terms of this agreement were not disclosed, KKLQ does not promote itself locally using the K-Love branding (instead using the brand Positive, Encouraging 100.3), and its station identification contains the positioning statement "The K-Love for Christian music" to distinguish it from KLVE.

== HD Radio ==
KKLQ broadcasts in HD Radio with both its HD1 and HD2 channels providing Artist Experience data including song titles, artists, and albums on compatible radios. Over the years, 100.3 FM has hosted a variety of formats on its HD sub-channels. The current HD sub-channel formats are:

- KKLQ-HD1 is a digital simulcast of the analog signal.
- KKLQ-HD2 broadcasts Air1, a contemporary worship music network with some contemporary Christian music, which is used for the feeder signal for EMF's Air1 translator network in Los Angeles and Orange counties.
- KKLQ-HD3 airs Radio Nueva Vida, a Spanish-language Christian teaching and music network. The service was introduced to this subchannel in October 2018. Nueva Vida is owned by The Association for Community Education, which has had affiliations and partnerships with EMF in the past.

=== Previous sub-channels ===
- HD2
  - Until the sale to EMF: YTN News FM 100.3, the first-ever South Korean all-news station in the United States.
- HD3
  - August—September 2018: K-Love Classics, a Christian classic hits network owned by EMF.
  - Until the sale to EMF: Radio Hamrah, Persian-language programming. After the sale to EMF, Radio Hamrah moved to KTWV-HD3.
  - Until the sale to Entercom: Mormon Channel, operated by the Church of Jesus Christ of Latter-day Saints, owners of Bonneville International.

== Notable former on-air staff ==
=== Pirate Radio ===
- Scott Shannon

=== 100.3 The Beat ===
- Steve Harvey

=== KCMG - Mega 100 ===
- George Lopez, morning host
- Smokey Robinson, weekend host
- Art Laboe, weekend host

=== 100.3 The Sound ===
- Mark Thompson, morning host. On August 3, 2016, he exited the station and planned to launch a syndicated radio program, Cool Stories in Music. His co-hosts remained.
- Andy Chanley, morning host
