= Andy Chanley =

American actor

- Born: July 29, 1968 (age 57); Greenwood, Indiana, U.S.
- Occupations: Actor, radio personality, voice artist
- Spouse: Lara Tabor (m. 2007)

Andy Chanley (born July 29, 1968) is an American voice-over artist, actor, and radio personality. He is a native of Greenwood, Indiana and until 2024 resided in Los Angeles, California.

== Career ==
Andy Chanley attended Purdue University in West Lafayette, Indiana, where he wrote for and served as managing editor of the university newspaper, the Purdue Exponent. As an upperclassman, he began his media career as a disc jockey at WKHY in Lafayette in the early 1990s. Later, he worked at WRZX in Indianapolis.

After launching his career in Indiana, Chanley relocated to Los Angeles, California. First, he served as an on-air personality with modern rock station KLYY (Y107), then he moved on to adult album alternative (AAA) outlet KACD-FM (Channel 103.1). For several years after leaving KACD-FM, Chanley focused solely on voice-over work for video games, radio, television, and films. His credits include the Über Narrator in the newsreel segment of the comedy film Dodgeball: A True Underdog Story and the voice of Jack Campbell in the video game Doom 3.

Chanley began his tenure with AAA station KSWD (100.3 The Sound) in Los Angeles in May 2008, signing on as its first on-air host. On February 2, 2015, he began co-hosting weekday mornings with Mark Thompson on the debut of Mark in the Morning. On January 15, 2016, Chanley moved into his own timeslot, hosting Andy in the Afternoon weekdays on 100.3 The Sound. The show lasted until August 2, 2016; the following day, he returned to morning drive, joining Gina Grad in the new Andy & Gina In The Morning show. Chanley served as KSWD's last DJ when the station signed off for the final time on November 16, 2017, at 1 p.m.

From January 22 to February 9, 2018, Chanley guest hosted afternoon drive on KCSN (88.5 FM) in place of general manager and program director Sky Daniels. On March 21, 2018, at 3 p.m., Daniels handed over the afternoon drive timeslot to Chanley live on air, effective immediately. Daniels would continue his off-air duties. On July 15, 2019, KCSN promoted Chanley to music director.

In February 2024, Chanley moved to WXRT in Chicago as afternoon host and music director.

== Personal life ==
In 2007, Chanley married former television producer and environmental advocate Lara Tabor. As of January 2024, the couple reside in Chicago, Illinois and have one child together.
