= The Mark & Brian Show =

American radio morning show

- Country of origin: United States
- Language: English
- Home station: KLOS (Los Angeles)
- Hosted by: Mark Thompson; Brian Phelps

The Mark & Brian Show was an American radio talk show hosted by Mark Thompson and Brian Phelps, known on the air as "Mark & Brian." The syndicated program aired weekday mornings from KLOS-FM in Los Angeles, California, and blended comedy sketches, listener phone calls, interviews with in-studio guests, and the occasional road trip. At the peak of its popularity, the show was syndicated to 21 other markets in the western US, including San Francisco, Honolulu, Portland, Oregon, and Tucson Arizona.

On August 17, 2020, the Radio Hall of Fame announced the Mark and Brian duo as inductees for its 2020 class.

== History ==
In 1985, Thompson was working as a disc jockey when he was introduced to Phelps, whose background was in improvisational comedy. Their first joint on-air appearance was in 1986 on WAPI-FM (I-95) in Birmingham, Alabama, where the initial incarnation of The Mark & Brian Show began.

Charlie West was hired to be the program director for KLOS in May 1987. He had a reputation for nurturing morning show talent and worked with Jeanne Tripplehorn a.k.a. "Jeannie Summers" on the air at KMOD Radio in Tulsa, OK before she ever got into the movies. One day, West came into Music Director Stephanie Mondello's office, sat down and said, "I've been listening to these audition tapes and there are these two guys, Mark and Brian." He played Mondello the audition tape. Then he said, "There's something about these guys I think I can work with." West and KLOS GM, Bill Sommers flew to Birmingham to meet Mark and Brian. Soon afterward an offer to move west and take over the morning slot at KLOS led to the premiere of The Mark & Brian Show in Los Angeles on September 8, 1987.

The Mark & Brian Show included sketches and annual events (including a golf tournament and a Christmas all-star rock concert). Popular sketches included "The Red Carpet Minute with Edward Gordon," "Miniature Theater," and other celebrity-based sketches. They were #1 in Los Angeles until 1992, when Howard Stern's syndicated show came to Los Angeles and took over the #1 spot in the Arbitron ratings.

On October 27, 1995, Mark & Brian convinced Frank Jordan, mayor of San Francisco, California to shower with them, completely nude, during a live radio show just before election day.

In 2006, they conducted their version of the reality TV-based contest "Two Strangers and a Wedding," in which single women auditioned to be the bride, then chose from five male finalists to marry—without ever meeting before the wedding. In 2007, the concept was modified to "Three Strangers and a Wedding," in which the bride chose two of the five male finalists to come to the wedding. Upon meeting the bride at the wedding, the grooms had the option of proposing to the bride, who could then accept either proposal or decline them both. Each of the resulting marriages was brief and ended in divorce.

On June 13, 2012, Thompson announced that he was retiring from radio after 25 years at the end of his contract, and would be moving to Charlotte, North Carolina with his wife. His last day at KLOS was revealed to be August 17, 2012. During Thompson's farewell show, Phelps announced that he would also be leaving KLOS, bringing The Mark & Brian Show to an end.

Former producers include Frank Murphy (a.k.a. "Mr. Owl") Nicole Sandler, Johnny Vega, and Rosemary Jimenez. Their last producer was Ted Lekas.

In September 2022, Thompson released his memoir, Don't Bump the Record, Kid: My Adventures With Mark and Brian (ISBN 979-8352202470) and appeared at various events on his book tour.

== Reunion ==
On April 8, 2019, KLOS, Mark Thompson, and Brian Phelps announced they would have a one-off reunion show on April 25, 2019. The show was to celebrate KLOS' 50th anniversary as well as promote The Mark & Brian Show for the Radio Hall of Fame. The official show was to run from 3–7 pm. They were also to make a guest appearance earlier that day at 9 am with Frosty, Heidi & Frank.

== Awards ==
Mark & Brian are two-time winners of the Billboard Magazine "Air Personalities of the Year" award, and received a 1991 National Association of Broadcasters Marconi Award as "Air Personalities of the Year." They have also received a star on the Hollywood Walk of Fame. Mark & Brian were inducted into the Radio Hall of Fame on October 29, 2020.

== Charitable donations ==
Mark & Brian released three CD compilations of material from their morning show: All of Me (1995), You Had To Be There (1997), and Little Drummer Boys (2000). All proceeds were donated to their favorite charities.

== Other appearances ==
The popularity of their radio show gave Mark & Brian several opportunities to branch out into other entertainment media. The duo appeared in several motion pictures, notably Jason Goes to Hell: The Final Friday (the 1993 ninth installment of the Friday the 13th series), Rocky V, the documentary Trekkies (1997), and The Princess Diaries (2001). They played concerned onlookers in the made-for-TV movie A Very Brady Christmas during one of the scenes at the collapsed building.

In 1991–92, they hosted a short-lived NBC TV series, The Adventures of Mark & Brian. Also in 1991, both DJs were guest stars on the TV show Star Trek: The Next Generation (S4 E18, "Identity Crisis"), albeit under heavy alien makeup. They appeared unbilled as caterers in the Married... with Children episode "Married...with Prom Queen". They played extras on an episode of Cheers (S9 E10, "Veggie-Boyd"), where they got to sit at the bar, much to the annoyance of the other extras. They had a "special appearance" in a 1993 episode of The Adventures of Brisco County, Jr., (S1 E14, "Mail Order Brides"), playing two cowboys walking into a whiskey only bar. They also appeared in the Phineas and Ferb episode "The Fast and the Phineas" as the announcers of the Swampy Oil 500.
