= KLOS =

Rock radio station in Los Angeles

- Los Angeles, California; United States
- Broadcast area: Greater Los Angeles Area
- Frequency: 95.5 MHz (HD Radio)
- Branding: 95.5 KLOS

Programming
- Format: Mainstream rock
- Subchannels: HD2: Talk radio; HD3: KIRN simulcast
- Affiliations: Westwood One

Ownership
- Owner: Meruelo Media; (KLOS Radio Holdings, LLC)
- Sister stations: KDAY; KDEY-FM; KLLI; KPWR; KWHY

History
- First air date: December 30, 1947
- Former call signs: KECA-FM (1947–1954); KABC-FM (1954–1971)
- Former frequencies: 99.5 MHz
- Call sign meaning: Los Angeles

Technical information
- Licensing authority: FCC
- Facility ID: 35078
- Class: B
- ERP: 63,000 watts
- HAAT: 954 meters (3,130 ft)
- Transmitter coordinates: 34.227°N 118.067°W
- Translator: 98.9 K255BZ (China Lake)

Links
- Public license information: Public file; LMS
- Webcast: Listen live; HD2: Listen live
- Website: 955klos.com

KLOS (95.5 FM, "95-5 KLOS") is a commercial radio station licensed to Los Angeles, California, United States, and serves the Greater Los Angeles area. Owned by Meruelo Media, KLOS airs a mainstream rock format and has broadcast rock music in some form since 1969.

The studios are on West Olive Avenue in Burbank, and the transmitter is located atop Mount Wilson. KLOS broadcasts in HD Radio: the second digital subchannel carries a talk radio format, and KLOS-HD3 is a simulcast of KIRN. KLOS is also rebroadcast on FM translator K255BZ in China Lake, California.

== History ==
=== Early years ===
The station first signed on the air on December 30, 1947, as KECA-FM, simulcasting the programming of KECA. The two stations were owned by ABC Radio. In 1954, the call letters of the AM and FM stations were changed to KABC and KABC-FM, to reflect their corporate ownership. In 1960, KABC-AM-FM adopted an all-talk format.

On January 1, 1968, due to new Federal Communications Commission (FCC) rules requiring FM stations to have separate programming from their AM counterparts, KABC-FM tried something new. It became the first station in Los Angeles with an all-news format. This experiment did not last long. KABC-FM dropped all-news programming on March 11, 1968, the same day that KFWB 980 AM switched to the format.

=== Rock formats ===
In early 1969, KABC-FM adopted a progressive rock format known as "Love". Under the direction of Allen Shaw, head of ABC FM Special Projects, the automated programming aired on ABC's other owned-and-operated stations—KGO-FM in San Francisco, KQV-FM in Pittsburgh, WABC-FM in New York City, WLS-FM in Chicago, and WXYZ-FM in Detroit. The syndicated format was voice-tracked by Brother John Rydgren.

Not long after its debut, Love was dropped in favor of live, locally programmed freeform rock music at KLOS and its FM sister stations. In 1971, the station adopted the KLOS call letters. The switch was made to avoid confusion with its AM talk station. In late 1971, the freeform progressive rock sound ended, as Shaw and KLOS program director Tom Yates launched the first album-oriented rock (AOR) station in the United States. Under AOR, KLOS played only the top tracks from the best-selling rock albums and used the slogan "Rock 'N Stereo". The initial slate of disc jockeys on KLOS includes Jeff Gonzer, J. J. Jackson, Jim Ladd, and Damion. By 1972, KLOS had become the top-rated FM rock station in Los Angeles. The station promoted an outdoor rock concert called "California Jam" held on April 6, 1974, at the Ontario Motor Speedway in Ontario, California.

After several years of ratings dominance by rival KMET, in 1980 consultant Jeff Pollack suggested that GM Bill Sommers hire Tommy Hadges from Boston (ex-WBCN & WCOZ) as Program Director. Hadges assembled an on-air team that included Frazier Smith, (from KROQ), Linda McGuinness (from KGB in San Diego), Bob Coburn (from WMET in Chicago) and "Uncle Joe" Benson (from WWWW in Cleveland). KLOS promoted very aggressively against KMET, giving away free parking to big concert events and distributing free t-shirts and bumper stickers featuring the name of the band performing. In the 1981 Fall Arbitron ratings, the 12+ share for KLOS was 5.7, compared to 3.7 for KROQ and 3.4 for KMET, which resulted in Hadges being named Program Director of the Year by the Los Angeles Times (Sunday, December 27, 1981, page 157). Later, Hadges organized an on-air Radiothon called Rock Relief For Africa, raising money for Ethiopian famine relief through the American Red Cross, supported by many local musicians including Jackson Browne, Bonnie Raitt and Ratt. In 1985, Hadges left his PD position to join Pollack Media Group as an international radio consultant, though continuing as direct consultant for KLOS under new PD Rita Wilde.

KLOS has sponsored a blood drive in conjunction with the American Red Cross annually since 1982. Blood donation centers are set up throughout the station's listening area for several days, usually in the summer months, when donation levels are typically low. In 2014, the blood drive collected approximately 7,900 units of whole blood, which can be separated into red blood cells and plasma. As a token of gratitude, the station has given donors rewards such as T-shirts and vouchers for concert tickets.

In the spring of 1987, KLOS general manager Bill Sommers hired longtime rock radio programmer Charlie West to be the station's new program director. West hired Stephanie Mondello as music director for the station. By fall, West brought the Mark & Brian Show (Mark Thompson and Brian Phelps) to KLOS for the morning drive. The station's Arbitron ratings grew steadily under West's direction; by 1988, KLOS emerged as the leader among Los Angeles album rock stations, finishing fifth overall in the market with a 4.3 share, up from a 3.6 in the previous rating period. When West left KLOS in early 1989, Mondello assumed programming duties, directing all key decisions and overall revenue and ratings strategies. The station maintained its fifth-place ranking overall in the market and reached the number-one position in its target young male demographics, defeating main rivals KLSX, KROQ-FM, and the upstart KQLZ (Pirate Radio). Mondello left KLOS in late 1990.

By 1994, KLOS was facing increased competitive pressure from KROQ-FM with the rise of its grunge-based modern rock format as well as KLSX and KCBS-FM (Arrow 93) which focused on classic rock. The station altered its format in response, dropping its existing DJs and most of the classic rock music in favor of more alternative rock content. This format and personnel change lasted about three years, after which most of the alternative music was jettisoned and classic rock returned. In 1997, KLOS hired John Duncan, previously at KYYS in Kansas City, Missouri, as program director and took the station in an adult rock direction. As part of his efforts to turn around the station, Duncan brought back Jim Ladd and hired Garth Kemp and other longtime Los Angeles radio personalities. During this period, KLOS ran a billboard campaign with lines such as, "We lost our mind for a moment, but we're okay now". Within eight months, the station moved from number 18 to fifth place among Los Angeles adults ages 25–54, reclaiming its status as the market's top adult rock station. Duncan left KLOS in late 1998.

In 2005, classic rock rival KCBS-FM flipped to adult hits as "Jack FM". The switch made KLOS the market's only full-time classic rock station until the launch of KSWD (100.3 The Sound) in April 2008.

In October 2006, KLOS restructured its daily lineup of radio hosts, Cynthia Fox, "Uncle Joe" Benson, and Jim Ladd saw each of their daily air shifts increase by one hour. However, this resulted in the temporary dismissal of former evening DJ Gary Moore; he returned in late 2007. Former overnight jock Mark Miller, previously from the long-defunct KQLZ, hosted The Best of Mark & Brian Saturday Special shows Saturday mornings. Miller's overnight shift was replaced with automated programming, billed as "KLOS After Hours". This show follows the usual classic rock format, though occasionally KLOS plays deep cuts and live versions of songs that are not usually played during the daytime.

In 2007, the station came under the ownership of Citadel Broadcasting after it merged with The Walt Disney Company's ABC Radio.

Occasionally, KLOS abandoned its format to air an "A to Z" special, where songs from the KLOS library were played alphabetically by title. Running 24 hours a day (with breaks only for Mark & Brian and Jim Ladd's show), it generally lasted about two weeks with no songs repeated. Unlike the station's regular playlist featuring primarily classic rock hits, the A to Z also included a large number of obscure album tracks. In its final years, the A to Z special aired around the Christmas holidays. Since the dismissal of program director Rita Wilde in 2009, the A to Z countdown has not aired on KLOS. However, then-classic rock competitor KSWD, which hired Wilde, revamped the idea with a very similar, though shorter, compilation of familiar hits and deep tracks.

=== Cumulus era ===
On September 16, 2011, Cumulus Media purchased Citadel, acquiring KLOS and sister station KABC.

On August 17, 2012, Mark Thompson and Brian Phelps appeared on KLOS for the final time, effectively ending The Mark & Brian Show after 25 years (including two years on previous station WAPI in Birmingham, Alabama). Three days later, on August 20, Cumulus announced that Heidi Hamilton and Frank Kramer, former hosts on KLSX and KABC, would host morning drive beginning September 4 as The Heidi & Frank Show. On August 15, 2016, Cumulus announced that Frosty Stillwell, with whom Hamilton and Kramer have co-hosted at the same two stations, would join the duo weekday mornings effective September 6.

In February 2016, KLOS launched Horns Up, a Saturday evening program hosted by Stew Herrera that featured heavy metal music. The show has since been replaced with a regular classic rock mix.

Canadian radio personality and comedy writer Greg Beharrell joined KLOS in January 2017 as a weekend host and social media content producer. He moved to weeknights in January 2019.

On February 8 and 9, 2018, KLOS was one of 14 Cumulus-owned rock radio stations to take part in the "St. Jude Rocks" nationwide fundraising campaign. KLOS listeners contributed more than $725,000 to St. Jude Children's Research Hospital in Memphis, Tennessee as part of the over $2 million total raised by participating Cumulus stations.

=== Meruelo Media era ===
On April 15, 2019, Cumulus announced the sale of KLOS to Meruelo Media for $43 million. This brings KLOS under common ownership with rhythmic top 40 station KPWR, classic hip-hop outlets KDAY and KDEY-FM, and regional Mexican station KXOS (which itself would be purchased by Meruelo over a month later; it is now Spanish rhythmic contemporary-formatted KLLI, "Cali 93.9"), as well as two Spanish-language television stations, KBEH and KWHY-TV. Meruelo began operating KLOS under a local marketing agreement beginning on April 16; the transaction closed on July 17. The sale of KLOS to Meruelo comes shortly after the sale of the former sister station WPLJ in New York City, as both stations were initially owned by ABC. Under the aegis of Allen Shaw, both stations were given the "Love" format followed by, in 1971, the live-and-local AOR format, together retaining the latter for 12 years (WPLJ flipped to top 40 in 1983; it became a non-commercial Christian music station as "K-Love" in 2019).

Further changes came to KLOS over the next year. On September 6, 2019, the station shifted its format to classic rock full-time, eliminating post-1990s modern rock tracks. On September 30, at 12:01 a.m., KLOS began broadcasting from its new studios at the Meruelo Media building in Burbank, leaving behind its previous location on Lindblade Street in Culver City (to which it and KABC relocated from their longtime La Cienega Boulevard studios in December 2016). The station also marked the return of the classic rock format to Los Angeles for the first time since KSWD flipped to the "K-Love" Christian music network in November 2017 as KKLQ. In late January 2020, KLOS switched back to mainstream rock and changed its slogan to "Southern California's Rock Station"; the station reintroduced post-1990s rock into the playlist while still maintaining a heavy focus on classic rock tracks. In a cost-cutting move prompted by the COVID-19 pandemic, Meruelo dismissed several members of the KLOS staff in mid-2020, including Frosty Stilwell, Gary Moore, and Frazer Smith; Frosty, Heidi & Frank reverted to its previous title Heidi & Frank.

On August 3, 2020, The Greg Beharrell Show entered national syndication, with KLOS serving as the flagship station.

On October 3, 2020, the nationally syndicated John Clay Wolfe Show joined KLOS on Saturday mornings.

Former KROQ-FM morning personality Kevin Ryder, half of the iconic duo Kevin & Bean, joined KLOS in the afternoons on February 18, 2021. Co-hosting Kevin & Sluggo, he reunited with Doug "Sluggo" Roberts after having worked together previously at KROQ and KZZP in Phoenix. Kevin and Sluggo were given their walking papers on September 6, 2024. The two have since returned to KROQ, with Roberts hosting middays and Ryder hosting afternoons. In January 2025, Nik Carter was named afternoon DJ.

On April 1, 2025, KLOS briefly stunted with yacht rock branded as 95.5 So'Cal's Yacht Rock as an April Fools Day joke.

== HD Radio ==
KLOS broadcasts in HD Radio with three digital subchannels:

- KLOS-HD1 is a digital simulcast of the analog signal.
- KLOS-HD2 features a talk format called "KLOS2". Meruelo Media officially launched the channel on March 4, 2021, but the station has been broadcasting under the new format since September 2020. KLOS2 is operated jointly with Toad Hop Entertainment, a company owned by KLOS morning co-host Frank Kramer who serves as program director for the new service. Programming consists of continuous Heidi & Frank repeats, with plans to add original shows later.
- KLOS-HD3 airs a simulcast of KIRN. It originally aired an Armenian music format branded as "SoCal Armenian" until around 2021.

Previous HD3 logo

== Notable personalities ==
Throughout its history as a rock station, KLOS has been home to many prominent progressive rock and AOR DJs.

Chris Carter hosts a locally produced version of Breakfast with the Beatles on Sunday mornings. Prior to landing at KLOS, Carter was heard on KACD-FM (Channel 103.1) in 2000 when it played adult album alternative (AAA) music. He is also the former bass player and producer for Dramarama and produced and supervised the music for the film Mayor of the Sunset Strip, a rock documentary about influential Los Angeles DJ Rodney Bingenheimer of KROQ-FM.

Bob Coburn (1980–1994), a former program director in Chicago and an assistant program director at KMET hosted the syndicated program Rockline. He later worked at KLSX, KCBS-FM (Arrow 93), and KZLA before returning to KLOS. Coburn died of lung cancer on December 17, 2016, at age 68.

Marc Coppola, who moved on to KGB-FM in San Diego, was on KLOS in 1977 and reappeared when it aired Westwood One's Rock 'N Roll Never Forgets. Damion and Steve Downes both co-hosted with Marc from 1986 to 1990.

Dion hosted late nights on a part-time basis for several years. He also hosted at KLSX during its classic rock era. In 2005, Al Ramirez, another longtime late-night DJ at KLOS, died of natural causes at the age of 54.

Cynthia Fox, former KMET and KLSX personality hosted the weekday show In Tune at Noon, featuring a daily celebration of events in rock and roll history and the news. She left KLOS in July 2013 and eventually joined rival classic rock station KSWD.

Jim Ladd presented his shows in a freeform manner, interrupting the regular classic rock format during his show middays and Sunday evenings. Ladd picked the music personally, often based on listener requests, and played it in thematic sets. On Thursday mornings at midnight, Ladd devoted an hour to "Headsets", which combines music with a slightly more "sonic" quality (designed to be heard with headphones, or with no background noise interfering), spoken-word poetry, and audio clips from movies and television. On Sundays, Ladd presented "Theme of Consciousness", with all songs within a three-hour window devoted to a singular word or "theme" and chosen entirely by the listening audience. In addition to his work with KLOS, Ladd also appeared on KNAC during its progressive era, KMET, and KLSX. Often dubbed "The Last DJ", after the Tom Petty song that was written about him, Ladd was allowed unusual latitude in selecting the music for his program. His show was routinely the number-one music-based show in its time slot. Ladd left KLOS in October 2011 and joined SiriusXM the following January, hosting daily on the Deep Tracks channel.

Jerry Longden, who worked as a DJ from 10 p.m. to 2 a.m. from 1972 to 1977, worked with Jim Ladd at KNAC 105.5 FM, Long Beach, California from 1969 to 1972. Longden won Billboard Magazine's 1971 Air Personality Award for Progressive Rock and the KLOS Station of The Year award in 1974. Longden and Ladd produced the successful 1974–1975 public service radio public service announcement program voiced by many prominent Rock recording artists of the day regarding hard drug abuse awareness, "Get Off" and "Get Off II", including thirty TV PSAs, (now in the Library of Congress) and were founders of The National Association of Progressive Radio Announcers. Longden was also the announcer for ABC's "In Concert" rock simulcast shows 1974-5 as well as the announcer for Rock Concert from 1973 to 1980. Longden worked evenings at KWST-FM, mid-days at KROQ-FM, and afternoons at KGIL-FM.

Joe Reiling (1977–1981, 2003–2009) started the Local Music Show (later renamed Local Licks). Most of Reiling's time away from the station found him hosting his own alternative rock show worldwide on AFN (American Forces Network, formerly AFRTS, Armed Forces Radio and Television Services). He was also involved in managing, producing, and programming the in-flight audio entertainment for many domestic and international airlines as well as Air Force One. Joe died on October 7, 2017.

Frank Sontag hosted a public affairs call-in talk show that aired Sunday nights and early Monday mornings. He was part of the Mark & Brian morning team and ran the control board, also contributing to the show at times. Sontag left the station in 2009; in 2013, he became the host of a Christian talk and discussion program, The Frank Sontag Show, on KKLA-FM.

Mark Thompson and Brian Phelps were the titular co-hosts of Mark & Brian, a morning drive sketch comedy show that aired from September 8, 1987, until August 17, 2012. Highlights from the show aired on weekdays for one hour before each regular weekday program. A recap edition, featuring the best of Mark & Brian each week, aired Saturday mornings.

Shana Livigni (1952–2015) was one of the first women to break into major market rock radio in the mid-’70s. She started at KLOS in 1980. She took over the morning drive on KLOS, the first woman to do that.

Other former KLOS personalities include Geno Michellini, "Uncle" Joe Benson, Steve Downes, and full-time fill-in Lynda Clayton. Denise Westwood (2000–2016), formerly at KMET, was heard on KLOS handling weekends and fill-in shifts. During her last few years at KLOS, Westwood also hosted the Sunday morning public affairs show Spotlight on the Community. Former program director Rita Wilde, who later went on to KSWD, had been choosing the music on KLOS for decades; afternoon DJ Joe Benson also left for KSWD.

KROQ alumni Kevin Ryder, Doug "Sluggo" Roberts, and Marci Wiser were members of the KLOS staff in the early 2020s before being laid off. Ryder and Roberts have since returned to KROQ, while Wiser hosts mornings at KITS in San Francisco.

== Awards and nominations ==
Since 1991, KLOS has won two Marconi Radio Awards, as well as three Crystal Radio Awards for its community service efforts.

Year	Awards	Category	Recipient	Result	Source
1991	NAB Marconi Radio Awards	Major Market Personality of the Year	Mark & Brian	Won	
1991	NAB Marconi Radio Awards	Major Market Station of the Year		Nominated	
1991	NAB Marconi Radio Awards	AOR/Classic Rock Station of the Year		Won	
1991	NAB Crystal Radio Awards			Won	
1999	NAB Crystal Radio Awards			Won	
2005	NAB Crystal Radio Awards			Won	
2006	NAB Marconi Radio Awards	Legendary Station of the Year		Nominated	
2006	NAB Marconi Radio Awards	Network Syndicated Personality of the Year	Mark & Brian	Nominated	
2006	NAB Crystal Radio Awards			Nominated	
2021	Gracie Awards	Host Non-Morning Drive (Music DJ/Personality) Major Market, Radio – Local	Marci Wiser	Won	
