= 2002 California gubernatorial election =

- November 5, 2002
- Turnout: 36.05% ▼5.38pp
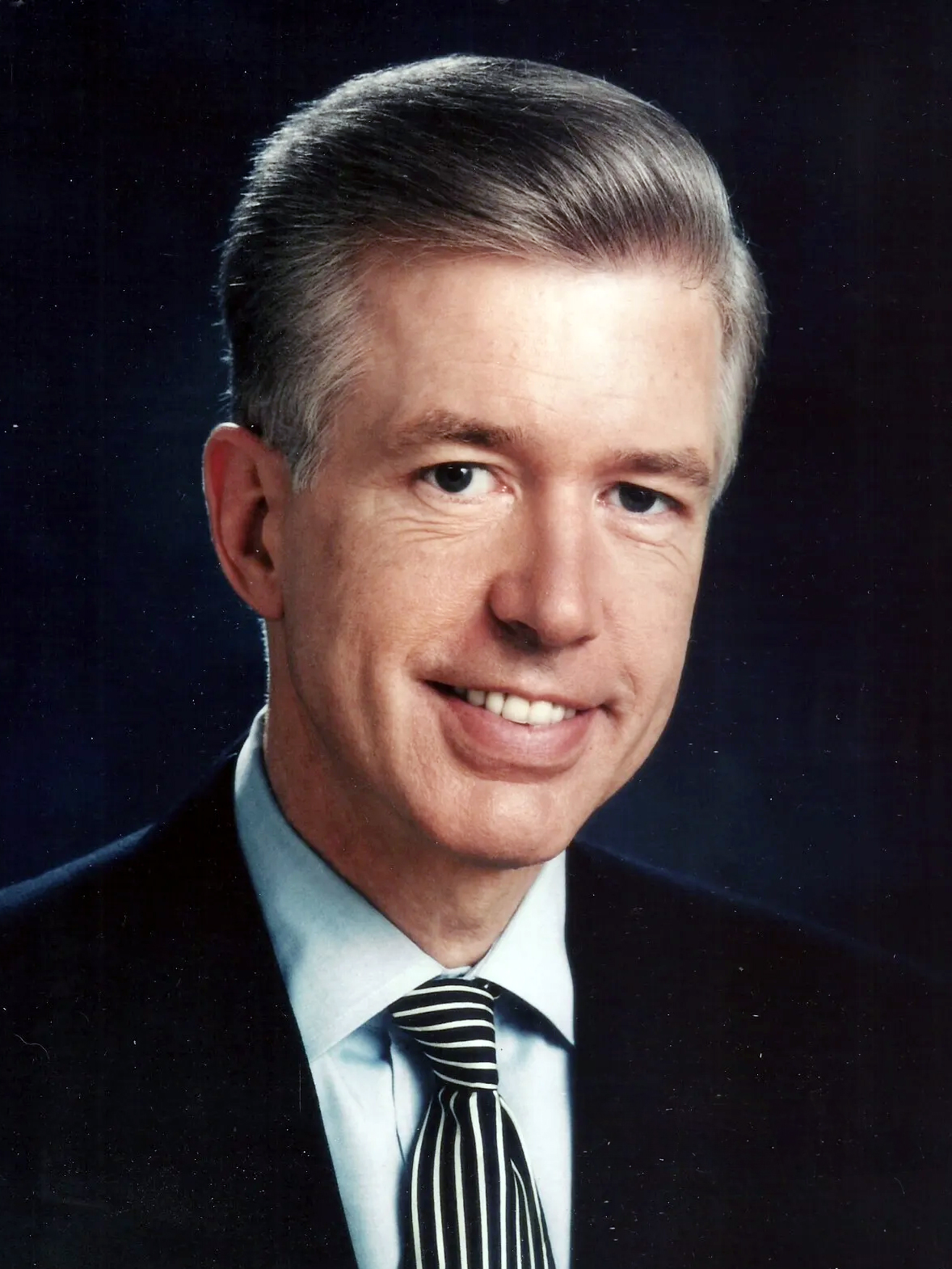

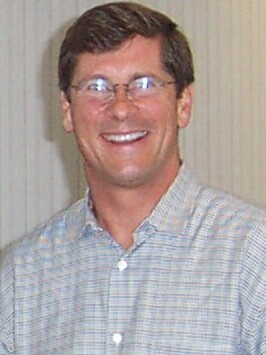

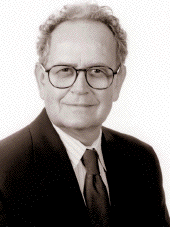
| Nominee | Gray Davis | Bill Simon | Peter Camejo |
| Party | Democratic | Republican | Green |
| Popular vote | 3,533,490 | 3,169,801 | 393,036 |
| Percentage | 47.26% | 42.40% | 5.26% |
- Davis: 40–50% 50–60% 60–70% 70–80% Simon: 40–50% 50–60% 60–70%
Governor before election
Gray Davis
Democratic
Elected Governor
Gray Davis
Democratic

The 2002 California gubernatorial election was an election that occurred on November 5, 2002. Gray Davis, a Democrat and the incumbent governor of California, defeated the Republican challenger Bill Simon by 5% and was re-elected to a second four-year term. Davis would be recalled less than a year into his next term.

Primary elections were held in March. As a result of California Democratic Party v. Jones, the nonpartisan blanket primary was replaced by partisan primaries. Davis faced no major competitor in the Democratic primary and won the nomination. Simon defeated former Los Angeles mayor Richard Riordan in the Republican primary. Davis ran a series of negative advertisements against Riordan in the primary. Riordan was seen as a moderate and early state polls showed him defeating Gray Davis in the general election. This election is the last time that a gubernatorial candidate was elected governor of California by a single-digit margin.

== Background ==
In 2000, the United States Supreme Court in California Democratic Party v. Jones struck down California's blanket primary.

== Democratic primary ==
=== Candidates ===
- Mosemarie Boyd
- Anselmo Chavez
- Gray Davis, incumbent governor since 1999
- Charles Pineda Jr.

=== Results ===
Democratic primary results
| Party | Candidate | Votes | % |
|---|---|---|---|
| Democratic | Gray Davis (incumbent) | 1,755,276 | 80.90% |
| Democratic | Anselmo A. Chavez | 179,301 | 8.26% |
| Democratic | Charles "Chuck" Pineda Jr. | 139,121 | 6.41% |
| Democratic | Mosemarie Boyd | 95,857 | 4.42% |
| Total votes | | 2,169,555 | 100.00% |

== Republican primary ==
=== Candidates ===
- Danney Ball
- Edie Bukewihge
- Jim Dimov
- Nick Jesson
- Bill Jones, Secretary of State of California since 1995 and former assemblyman from Fresno
- Richard Riordan, former mayor of Los Angeles
- Bill Simon, attorney, businessman, and son of William E. Simon

=== Campaign ===
Polls showed that, as a moderate, Riordan would be a more formidable challenger in the general election than his conservative opponents. Polls even showed that Riordan would defeat Davis. However, the end of the blanket primary meant that only non-partisans and registered Republicans could vote in the primary, making it more difficult for Riordan to win, given that primary voters are typically much more ideological than those who vote in the general election.

During the early stages of the campaign, Riordan focused his campaign and advertisements against Davis. Davis took the unusual step of taking out campaign advertisements against Riordan, questioning his support for anti-abortion politicians and judges, during the primary season. Davis stated that Riordan had attacked his record and that his campaign was defending his record. Other advertisements cited Riordan's call for a moratorium on capital punishment and contrasted against Davis's strong support for it. These advertisements appear to have contributed to Riordan's ultimate defeat by the more staunchly conservative Simon.

The primary campaign also included negative attacks between Riordan and Bill Jones. Jones advertisements highlighted that Riordan had contributed money to Davis in the past and had called Bill Clinton, "the greatest leader in the free world." Riordan's advertisements highlighted that Jones had also contributed money to Davis. By late February, Riordan's strong polling lead in the Republican primary had begun to slip.

=== Debates ===
2002 California gubernatorial election republican primary debate
| No. | Date | Host | Moderator | Link | Republican | Republican | Republican |
| Key: P Participant A Absent N Not invited I Invited W Withdrawn | | | | | | | |
| Key: P Participant A Absent N Not invited I Invited W Withdrawn | | | | | Bill Jones | Richard Riordan | Bill Simon |
|---|---|---|---|---|---|---|---|
| 1 | Jan. 2, 2002 | San Jose State University | Stan Statham | C-SPAN | P | P | P |

=== Results ===
Results by county

Results by congressional district

Simon: 30–40% 40–50% 50–60% 60–70%
Riordan: 30–40% 40–50% 50–60%
Jones: 40–50% 50–60% 60–70%

Republican primary results
| Party | Candidate | Votes | % |
|---|---|---|---|
| Republican | Bill Simon | 1,129,973 | 49.44% |
| Republican | Richard Riordan | 715,768 | 31.32% |
| Republican | Bill Jones | 387,237 | 16.94% |
| Republican | Nick Jesson | 19,287 | 0.84% |
| Republican | Edie Bukewihge | 14,436 | 0.63% |
| Republican | Danney Ball | 13,156 | 0.58% |
| Republican | Jim Dimov | 5,595 | 0.24% |
| Total votes | | 2,285,452 | 100.00% |

== Other primaries ==
=== Green ===
Green primary results
| Party | Candidate | Votes | % |
|---|---|---|---|
| Green | Peter Miguel Camejo | 35,767 | 100.00% |
| Total votes | | 35,767 | 100.00% |

=== Libertarian ===
Libertarian primary
| Party | Candidate | Votes | % |
|---|---|---|---|
| Libertarian | Gary David Copeland | 19,079 | 98.80% |
| Libertarian | Art Olivier (write-in) | 232 | 1.20% |
| Total votes | | 19,311 | 100.00% |

=== American Independent ===
American Independent primary results
| Party | Candidate | Votes | % |
|---|---|---|---|
| American Independent | Reinhold Gulke | 26,269 | 100.00% |
| Total votes | | 26,269 | 100.00% |

=== Natural Law ===
Natural Law primary
| Party | Candidate | Votes | % |
|---|---|---|---|
| Natural Law | Iris Adam | 4,402 | 100.00% |
| Total votes | | 4,402 | 100.00% |

== General election ==
=== Candidates ===
- Iris Adam (Natural Law)
- Peter Camejo, activist and author (Green)
- Gary David Copeland (Libertarian)
- Gray Davis, incumbent governor since 1999 (Democratic)
- Reinhold Gulke (American Independent)
- Bill Simon, attorney, businessman, and son of William E. Simon (Republican)

=== Campaign ===
Davis was re-elected in the November 2002 general election following a long and bitter campaign against Simon, marked by accusations of ethical lapses on both sides and widespread voter apathy. Simon was also hurt by a financial fraud scandal that tarnished his reputation. Davis' campaign featured several negative advertisements that highlighted Simon's financial fraud scandal. Simon attacked Davis for supposedly fundraising in the lieutenant governor of California's office during his time as Lieutenant Governor; the attack backfired when it turned out the photograph had been instead taken in a private home in Santa Monica.

The 2002 gubernatorial race was the most expensive in California state history with over $100 million spent. Davis' campaign was better financed; Davis had over $26 million in campaign reserves more than Simon in August 2002. Davis won re-election with 47.3% of the vote to Simon's 42.4%. It had the lowest voter turnout percentage in modern gubernatorial history, allowing for a lower than normal number of signatures required for a recall election, which ultimately qualified in 2003. Davis won the election but the majority of the voters disliked Davis and did not approve of his job performance.

=== Predictions ===
| Source | Ranking | As of |
|---|---|---|
| The Cook Political Report | Lean D | October 31, 2002 |
| Sabato's Crystal Ball | Likely D | November 4, 2002 |

=== Polling ===
| Poll source | Date(s) administered | Sample size (Note: Key: A – all adults RV – registered voters LV – likely voters V – unclear) | Margin of error | Gray Davis (D) | Bill Simon (R) | Peter Camejo (G) | Gary Copeland (L) | Other / Undecided |
|---|---|---|---|---|---|---|---|---|
| SurveyUSA | November 1–3, 2002 | 563 (LV) | ± 4.2% | 45% | 39% | 8% | 4% | 5% |

=== Results ===

2002 California gubernatorial election
| Party | Candidate | Votes | % | ±% |
|---|---|---|---|---|
| Democratic | Gray Davis (incumbent) | 3,533,490 | 47.26% | −10.71% |
| Republican | Bill Simon | 3,169,801 | 42.40% | +4.02% |
| Green | Peter Miguel Camejo | 393,036 | 5.26% | +4.01% |
| Libertarian | Gary David Copeland | 161,203 | 2.16% | +1.28% |
| American Independent | Reinhold Gulke | 128,035 | 1.71% | +1.26% |
| Natural Law | Iris Adam | 88,415 | 1.18% | +0.81% |
| Write-in | | 2,331 | 0.03% | |
| Invalid or blank votes | | 262,470 | 3.39% | |
| Majority | | 363,689 | 4.86% | |
| Total votes | | 7,476,311 (Note: Total votes cast for candidates; does not include blank votes. The percentages in the Statement of Vote are based on this total, while the percentage for blank votes is calculated using the combined total of valid votes and blank votes.) | 100.00% | |
| Democratic hold | | Swing | -14.73% | |

==== Results by county ====
| County | Gray Davis Democratic | | Bill Simon Republican | | Peter Camejo Green | | Gary Copeland Libertarian | | Reinhold Gulke AIP | | Iris Adam NLP | | All Others Write-in | | Margin | | Total votes cast |
| County | # | % | # | % | # | % | # | % | # | % | # | % | # | % | # | % | Total votes cast |
|---|---|---|---|---|---|---|---|---|---|---|---|---|---|---|---|---|---|
| Alameda | 216,058 | 62.83% | 76,407 | 22.22% | 37,919 | 11.03% | 6,558 | 1.91% | 3,622 | 1.05% | 3,319 | 0.97% | 18 | 0.01% | 139,651 | 40.61% | 343,901 |
| Alpine | 229 | 40.89% | 247 | 44.11% | 40 | 7.14% | 15 | 2.68% | 17 | 3.04% | 12 | 2.14% | 0 | 0.00% | -18 | -3.21% | 560 |
| Amador | 4,437 | 34.19% | 6,997 | 53.91% | 740 | 5.70% | 246 | 1.90% | 338 | 2.60% | 220 | 1.70% | 0 | 0.00% | -2.560 | -19.73% | 12,978 |
| Butte | 19,437 | 31.63% | 32,706 | 53.22% | 5,963 | 9.70% | 1,050 | 1.71% | 1,497 | 2.44% | 802 | 1.30% | 2 | 0.00% | -13,269 | -21.59% | 61,457 |
| Calaveras | 5,052 | 33.25% | 8,104 | 53.34% | 875 | 5.76% | 434 | 2.86% | 489 | 3.22% | 240 | 1.58% | 0 | 0.00% | -3,052 | -20.09% | 15,194 |
| Colusa | 1,243 | 27.17% | 2,996 | 65.49% | 131 | 2.86% | 48 | 1.05% | 118 | 2.58% | 39 | 0.85% | 0 | 0.00% | -1,753 | -38.32% | 4,575 |
| Contra Costa | 140,975 | 53.22% | 94,487 | 35.67% | 16,676 | 6.30% | 5,894 | 2.23% | 3,905 | 1.47% | 2,931 | 1.11% | 2 | 0.00% | 46,488 | 17.55% | 264,870 |
| Del Norte | 2,922 | 43.29% | 3,093 | 45.82% | 207 | 3.07% | 165 | 2.44% | 239 | 3.54% | 124 | 1.84% | 0 | 0.00% | -171 | -2.53% | 6,750 |
| El Dorado | 16,402 | 29.43% | 32,898 | 59.03% | 3,418 | 6.13% | 1,072 | 1.92% | 1,203 | 2.16% | 736 | 1.32% | 0 | 0.00% | -16,496 | -29.60% | 55,729 |
| Fresno | 59,019 | 37.96% | 85,910 | 55.26% | 3,508 | 2.26% | 3,560 | 2.29% | 2,214 | 1.42% | 1,260 | 0.81% | 0 | 0.00% | -26,891 | -17.30% | 155,471 |
| Glenn | 1,685 | 25.86% | 4,268 | 65.49% | 187 | 2.87% | 96 | 1.47% | 200 | 3.07% | 81 | 1.24% | 0 | 0.00% | -2,583 | -39.63% | 6,517 |
| Humboldt | 19,499 | 45.44% | 16,118 | 37.56% | 5,170 | 12.05% | 961 | 2.24% | 547 | 1.27% | 612 | 1.43% | 0 | 0.00% | 3,381 | 7.88% | 42,907 |
| Imperial | 11,644 | 53.29% | 8,789 | 40.23% | 546 | 2.50% | 258 | 1.18% | 360 | 1.65% | 252 | 1.15% | 0 | 0.00% | 2,855 | 13.07% | 21,849 |
| Inyo | 2,114 | 33.62% | 3,567 | 56.73% | 210 | 3.34% | 142 | 2.26% | 159 | 2.53% | 96 | 1.53% | 0 | 0.00% | -1,453 | -23.11% | 6,288 |
| Kern | 46,250 | 33.69% | 82,660 | 60.21% | 1,965 | 1.43% | 1,839 | 1.34% | 3,002 | 2.19% | 1,568 | 1.14% | 4 | 0.00% | -36,410 | -26.52% | 137,288 |
| Kings | 7,776 | 36.65% | 12,212 | 57.56% | 298 | 1.40% | 246 | 1.16% | 491 | 2.31% | 192 | 0.91% | 0 | 0.00% | -4,436 | -20.91% | 21,215 |
| Lake | 7,424 | 46.71% | 6,459 | 40.64% | 965 | 6.07% | 336 | 2.11% | 451 | 2.84% | 258 | 1.62% | 0 | 0.00% | 965 | 6.07% | 15,893 |
| Lassen | 2,429 | 31.57% | 4,512 | 58.64% | 155 | 2.01% | 166 | 2.16% | 317 | 4.12% | 115 | 1.49% | 0 | 0.00% | -2,083 | -27.07% | 7,694 |
| Los Angeles | 953,162 | 55.87% | 594,748 | 34.86% | 72,886 | 4.27% | 39,934 | 2.34% | 25,160 | 1.47% | 19,067 | 1.12% | 1,102 | 0.06% | 358,414 | 21.01% | 1,706,059 |
| Madera | 8,217 | 31.40% | 15,998 | 61.13% | 517 | 1.98% | 517 | 1.98% | 651 | 2.49% | 269 | 1.03% | 0 | 0.00% | -7,781 | -29.73% | 26,169 |
| Marin | 49,512 | 56.23% | 24,520 | 27.85% | 10,710 | 12.16% | 1,502 | 1.71% | 917 | 1.04% | 890 | 1.01% | 4 | 0.00% | 24,992 | 28.38% | 88,055 |
| Mariposa | 2,126 | 32.78% | 3,720 | 57.36% | 215 | 3.32% | 130 | 2.00% | 193 | 2.98% | 101 | 1.56% | 0 | 0.00% | -1,594 | -24.58% | 6,485 |
| Mendocino | 10,832 | 43.50% | 8,331 | 33.45% | 4,119 | 16.54% | 581 | 2.33% | 680 | 2.73% | 359 | 1.44% | 2 | 0.01% | 2,501 | 10.04% | 24,904 |
| Merced | 18,071 | 44.56% | 19,191 | 47.32% | 792 | 1.95% | 1,379 | 3.40% | 749 | 1.85% | 374 | 0.92% | 2 | 0.00% | -1,120 | -2.76% | 40,558 |
| Modoc | 900 | 26.62% | 2,161 | 63.92% | 54 | 1.60% | 67 | 1.98% | 145 | 4.29% | 54 | 1.60% | 0 | 0.00% | -1,261 | -37.30% | 3,381 |
| Mono | 1,064 | 35.99% | 1,552 | 52.50% | 154 | 5.21% | 64 | 2.17% | 76 | 2.57% | 46 | 1.56% | 0 | 0.00% | -488 | -16.51% | 2,956 |
| Monterey | 47,052 | 54.10% | 31,532 | 36.25% | 3,794 | 4.36% | 2,191 | 2.52% | 1,402 | 1.61% | 1,003 | 1.15% | 0 | 0.00% | 15,520 | 17.84% | 86,974 |
| Napa | 17,516 | 47.76% | 13,483 | 36.77% | 3,570 | 9.73% | 774 | 2.11% | 824 | 2.25% | 505 | 1.38% | 0 | 0.00% | 4,033 | 11.00% | 36,672 |
| Nevada | 13,338 | 33.93% | 20,573 | 52.33% | 3,297 | 8.39% | 743 | 1.89% | 817 | 2.08% | 546 | 1.39% | 1 | 0.00% | -7,235 | -18.40% | 39,315 |
| Orange | 222,149 | 34.66% | 368,152 | 57.43% | 16,670 | 2.60% | 14,668 | 2.29% | 10,393 | 1.62% | 8,374 | 1.31% | 602 | 0.09% | -146,003 | -22.78% | 641,008 |
| Placer | 28,495 | 29.66% | 58,623 | 61.03% | 4,657 | 4.85% | 1,500 | 1.56% | 1,556 | 1.62% | 1,222 | 1.27% | 3 | 0.00% | -30,128 | -31.37% | 96,056 |
| Plumas | 2,598 | 33.06% | 4,310 | 54.85% | 380 | 4.84% | 182 | 2.32% | 264 | 3.36% | 124 | 1.58% | 0 | 0.00% | -1,712 | -21.79% | 7,858 |
| Riverside | 121,845 | 40.25% | 159,440 | 52.68% | 5,995 | 1.98% | 6,601 | 2.18% | 5,530 | 1.83% | 2,987 | 0.99% | 285 | 0.09% | -37,595 | -12.42% | 302,683 |
| Sacramento | 129,143 | 40.82% | 147,456 | 46.60% | 22,232 | 7.03% | 6,634 | 2.10% | 6,245 | 1.97% | 4,668 | 1.48% | 19 | 0.01% | -18,313 | -5.79% | 316,397 |
| San Benito | 6,049 | 48.89% | 5,163 | 41.73% | 504 | 4.07% | 275 | 2.22% | 208 | 1.68% | 174 | 1.41% | 0 | 0.00% | 886 | 7.16% | 12,373 |
| San Bernardino | 116,757 | 41.23% | 142,513 | 50.32% | 6,754 | 2.38% | 6,485 | 2.29% | 6,884 | 2.43% | 3,751 | 1.32% | 47 | 0.02% | -25,756 | -9.09% | 283,191 |
| San Diego | 268,278 | 40.57% | 342,095 | 51.73% | 18,184 | 2.75% | 13,742 | 2.08% | 11,246 | 1.70% | 7,662 | 1.16% | 91 | 0.01% | -73,817 | -11.16% | 661,298 |
| San Francisco | 143,102 | 66.20% | 33,214 | 15.37% | 33,495 | 15.50% | 3,048 | 1.41% | 1,639 | 0.76% | 1,649 | 0.76% | 9 | 0.00% | 109,607 (Note: Margin over Camejo) | 50.70% | 216,196 |
| San Joaquin | 53,747 | 43.54% | 58,239 | 47.18% | 4,630 | 3.75% | 2,540 | 2.06% | 2,736 | 2.22% | 1,546 | 1.25% | 5 | 0.00% | -4,492 | -3.64% | 123,443 |
| San Luis Obispo | 29,732 | 36.40% | 43,552 | 53.31% | 4,189 | 5.13% | 1,618 | 1.98% | 1,531 | 1.87% | 1,033 | 1.26% | 35 | 0.04% | -13,820 | -16.92% | 81,690 |
| San Mateo | 99,803 | 57.95% | 51,497 | 29.90% | 13,537 | 7.86% | 3,205 | 1.86% | 2,144 | 1.24% | 2,020 | 1.17% | 4 | 0.00% | 48,306 | 28.05% | 172,210 |
| Santa Barbara | 50,741 | 44.32% | 52,832 | 46.15% | 5,785 | 5.05% | 2,586 | 2.26% | 1,401 | 1.22% | 1,141 | 1.00% | 5 | 0.00% | -2,091 | -1.83% | 114,491 |
| Santa Clara | 199,399 | 55.33% | 116,862 | 32.43% | 24,097 | 6.69% | 9,430 | 2.62% | 5,951 | 1.65% | 4,652 | 1.29% | 5 | 0.00% | 82,537 | 22.90% | 360,396 |
| Santa Cruz | 43,469 | 56.03% | 20,598 | 26.55% | 9,409 | 12.13% | 1,777 | 2.29% | 1,166 | 1.50% | 1,164 | 1.50% | 1 | 0.00% | 22,871 | 29.48% | 77,584 |
| Shasta | 15,292 | 31.49% | 28,625 | 58.95% | 1,283 | 2.64% | 942 | 1.94% | 1,664 | 3.43% | 753 | 1.55% | 0 | 0.00% | -13,333 | -27.46% | 48,559 |
| Sierra | 420 | 29.21% | 805 | 55.98% | 72 | 5.01% | 67 | 4.66% | 50 | 3.48% | 24 | 1.67% | 0 | 0.00% | -385 | -26.77% | 1,438 |
| Siskiyou | 4,972 | 31.87% | 9,112 | 58.40% | 437 | 2.80% | 386 | 2.47% | 440 | 2.82% | 252 | 1.62% | 4 | 0.03% | -4,140 | -26.53% | 15,603 |
| Solano | 46,385 | 52.40% | 33,516 | 37.86% | 4,038 | 4.56% | 1,316 | 1.49% | 2,174 | 2.46% | 1,092 | 1.23% | 1 | 0.00% | 12,869 | 14.54% | 88,522 |
| Sonoma | 73,079 | 50.39% | 43,408 | 29.93% | 19,599 | 13.51% | 3,097 | 2.14% | 3,529 | 2.43% | 2,312 | 1.59% | 4 | 0.00% | 29,671 | 20.46% | 145,028 |
| Stanislaus | 41,908 | 43.57% | 46,091 | 47.91% | 2,967 | 3.08% | 1,385 | 1.44% | 2,732 | 2.84% | 1,111 | 1.15% | 0 | 0.00% | -4,183 | -4.35% | 96,194 |
| Sutter | 5,782 | 29.85% | 12,024 | 62.08% | 620 | 3.20% | 242 | 1.25% | 463 | 2.39% | 239 | 1.23% | 0 | 0.00% | -6,242 | -32.23% | 19,370 |
| Tehama | 5,000 | 32.48% | 9,010 | 58.54% | 361 | 2.35% | 254 | 1.65% | 537 | 3.49% | 230 | 1.49% | 0 | 0.00% | -4,010 | -26.05% | 15,392 |
| Trinity | 1,833 | 37.23% | 2,421 | 49.17% | 272 | 5.52% | 140 | 2.84% | 165 | 3.35% | 93 | 1.89% | 0 | 0.00% | -588 | -11.94% | 4.924 |
| Tulare | 21,294 | 34.07% | 37,172 | 59.48% | 1,090 | 1.74% | 1,208 | 1.93% | 1,180 | 1.89% | 553 | 0.88% | 1 | 0.00% | -15,878 | -25.41% | 62,498 |
| Tuolumne | 6,846 | 38.16% | 9,251 | 51.56% | 773 | 4.31% | 328 | 1.83% | 476 | 2.65% | 267 | 1.49% | 1 | 0.01% | -2,405 | -13.40% | 17,942 |
| Ventura | 83,557 | 43.21% | 91,193 | 47.16% | 6,563 | 3.39% | 5,787 | 2.99% | 3,733 | 1.93% | 2,483 | 1.28% | 71 | 0.04% | -7,636 | -3.95% | 193,387 |
| Yolo | 21,983 | 47.43% | 17,484 | 37.72% | 4,934 | 10.64% | 543 | 1.17% | 842 | 1.82% | 566 | 1.22% | 1 | 0.00% | 4,499 | 9.71% | 46,353 |
| Yuba | 3,447 | 29.71% | 6,904 | 59.50% | 428 | 3.69% | 249 | 2.15% | 373 | 3.21% | 202 | 1.74% | 0 | 0.00% | -3,457 | -29.79% | 11,603 |
| Total | 3,533,490 | 47.26% | 3,169,801 | 42.40% | 393,036 | 5.26% | 161,203 | 2.16% | 128,035 | 1.71% | 88,415 | 1.18% | 2,331 | 0.03% | 363,689 | 4.86% | 7,476,311 |

Counties that flipped from Democratic to Republican

- Alpine (largest municipality: Markleeville)
- Amador (largest municipality: Ione)
- Del Norte (largest municipality: Crescent City)
- Kings (largest community: Avenal)
- Merced (largest community: Merced)
- Mono (largest municipality: Mammoth Lakes)
- Riverside (largest city: Riverside)
- Sacramento (largest municipality: Sacramento)
- San Bernardino (largest town: San Bernardino)
- San Diego (largest community: San Diego)
- San Joaquin (largest city: Stockton)
- San Luis Obispo (largest town: San Luis Obispo)
- Santa Barbara (largest municipality: Santa Barbara)
- Stanislaus (largest community: Modesto)
- Trinity (largest community: Weaverville)
- Ventura (largest city: Ventura)

==== Results by congressional district ====
Davis won 33 of 53 congressional districts.

| District | Davis | Simon | Camejo | Representative |
|---|---|---|---|---|
| 1st | 46.9% | 36.3% | 11.2% | Mike Thompson |
| 2nd | 31.1% | 57.6% | 5.3% | Wally Herger |
| 3rd | 34.0% | 54.5% | 5.8% | Doug Ose |
| 4th | 30.6% | 58.5% | 5.6% | John Doolittle |
| 5th | 50.4% | 35.3% | 8.7% | Bob Matsui |
| 6th | 53.1% | 28.6% | 13.2% | Lynn Woolsey |
| 7th | 59.7% | 29.1% | 5.9% | George Miller |
| 8th | 66.7% | 13.9% | 16.4% | Nancy Pelosi |
| 9th | 67.5% | 12.8% | 16.2% | Barbara Lee |
| 10th | 49.9% | 39.1% | 6.2% | Ellen Tauscher |
| 11th | 40.9% | 50.5% | 3.8% | Richard Pombo |
| 12th | 60.3% | 27.3% | 8.6% | Tom Lantos |
| 13th | 62.8% | 26.7% | 6.3% | Pete Stark |
| 14th | 54.9% | 31.3% | 8.8% | Anna Eshoo |
| 15th | 55.0% | 33.4% | 6.3% | Mike Honda |
| 16th | 56.3% | 31.3% | 6.0% | Zoe Lofgren |
| 17th | 55.4% | 32.3% | 7.2% | Sam Farr |
| 18th | 50.5% | 40.2% | 3.1% | Gary Condit (107th Congress) |
| 18th | 50.5% | 40.2% | 3.1% | Dennis Cardoza (108th Congress) |
| 19th | 35.7% | 56.6% | 2.7% | George Radanovich |
| 20th | 53.1% | 40.6% | 2.1% | Cal Dooley |
| 21st | 32.4% | 60.9% | 1.8% | Bill Thomas (107th Congress) |
| 21st | 32.4% | 60.9% | 1.8% | Devin Nunes (108th Congress) |
| 22nd | 28.8% | 64.3% | 1.9% | Lois Capps (107th Congress) |
| 22nd | 28.8% | 64.3% | 1.9% | Bill Thomas (108th Congress) |
| 23rd | 48.0% | 40.7% | 5.8% | Elton Gallegly (107th Congress) |
| 23rd | 48.0% | 40.7% | 5.8% | Lois Capps (108th Congress) |
| 24th | 39.4% | 52.1% | 3.0% | Brad Sherman (107th Congress) |
| 24th | 39.4% | 52.1% | 3.0% | Elton Gallegly (108th Congress) |
| 25th | 34.3% | 57.5% | 2.4% | Buck McKeon |
| 26th | 37.6% | 54.3% | 3.0% | Howard Berman (107th Congress) |
| 26th | 37.6% | 54.3% | 3.0% | David Dreier (108th Congress) |
| 27th | 50.1% | 40.0% | 4.1% | Adam Schiff (107th Congress) |
| 27th | 50.1% | 40.0% | 4.1% | Brad Sherman (108th Congress) |
| 28th | 62.2% | 27.9% | 5.0% | David Dreier (107th Congress) |
| 28th | 62.2% | 27.9% | 5.0% | Howard Berman (108th Congress) |
| 29th | 52.2% | 38.7% | 4.7% | Henry Waxman (107th Congress) |
| 29th | 52.2% | 38.7% | 4.7% | Adam Schiff (108th Congress) |
| 30th | 57.1% | 33.0% | 5.3% | Xavier Becerra (107th Congress) |
| 30th | 57.1% | 33.0% | 5.3% | Henry Waxman (108th Congress) |
| 31st | 68.6% | 19.5% | 7.5% | Hilda Solis (107th Congress) |
| 31st | 68.6% | 19.5% | 7.5% | Xavier Becerra (108th Congress) |
| 32nd | 59.5% | 31.9% | 3.6% | Diane Watson (107th Congress) |
| 32nd | 59.5% | 31.9% | 3.6% | Hilda Solis (108th Congress) |
| 33rd | 74.7% | 15.2% | 5.2% | Lucille Roybal-Allard (107th Congress) |
| 33rd | 74.7% | 15.2% | 5.2% | Diane Watson (108th Congress) |
| 34th | 63.4% | 27.3% | 4.7% | Grace Napolitano (107th Congress) |
| 34th | 63.4% | 27.3% | 4.7% | Lucille Roybal-Allard (108th Congress) |
| 35th | 73.6% | 18.6% | 3.0% | Maxine Waters |
| 36th | 49.5% | 39.8% | 4.9% | Jane Harman |
| 37th | 67.7% | 23.6% | 3.7% | Juanita Millender-McDonald |
| 38th | 62.3% | 28.7% | 4.3% | Steve Horn (107th Congress) |
| 38th | 62.3% | 28.7% | 4.3% | Grace Napolitano (108th Congress) |
| 39th | 54.1% | 38.0% | 3.3% | Ed Royce (107th Congress) |
| 39th | 54.1% | 38.0% | 3.3% | Linda Sánchez (108th Congress) |
| 40th | 34.6% | 57.7% | 2.4% | Jerry Lewis (107th Congress) |
| 40th | 34.6% | 57.7% | 2.4% | Ed Royce (108th Congress) |
| 41st | 35.5% | 55.5% | 2.2% | Gary Miller (107th Congress) |
| 41st | 35.5% | 55.5% | 2.2% | Jerry Lewis (108th Congress) |
| 42nd | 31.9% | 61.1% | 2.2% | Joe Baca (107th Congress) |
| 42nd | 31.9% | 61.1% | 2.2% | Gary Miller (108th Congress) |
| 43rd | 57.4% | 34.6% | 2.8% | Ken Calvert (107th Congress) |
| 43rd | 57.4% | 34.6% | 2.8% | Joe Baca (108th Congress) |
| 44th | 37.0% | 55.4% | 2.5% | Mary Bono (107th Congress) |
| 44th | 37.0% | 55.4% | 2.5% | Ken Calvert (108th Congress) |
| 45th | 42.3% | 51.5% | 1.7% | Dana Rohrabacher (107th Congress) |
| 45th | 42.3% | 51.5% | 1.7% | Mary Bono (108th Congress) |
| 46th | 36.4% | 55.8% | 2.9% | Loretta Sanchez (107th Congress) |
| 46th | 36.4% | 55.8% | 2.9% | Dana Rohrabacher (108th Congress) |
| 47th | 50.8% | 40.3% | 3.1% | Christopher Cox (107th Congress) |
| 47th | 50.8% | 40.3% | 3.1% | Loretta Sanchez (108th Congress) |
| 48th | 32.8% | 59.4% | 2.8% | Darrell Issa (107th Congress) |
| 48th | 32.8% | 59.4% | 2.8% | Christopher Cox (108th Congress) |
| 49th | 32.9% | 59.8% | 2.0% | Susan Davis (107th Congress) |
| 49th | 32.9% | 59.8% | 2.0% | Darrell Issa (108th Congress) |
| 50th | 37.3% | 55.6% | 2.6% | Bob Filner (107th Congress) |
| 50th | 37.3% | 55.6% | 2.6% | Duke Cunningham (108th Congress) |
| 51st | 53.5% | 39.7% | 2.3% | Duke Cunningham (107th Congress) |
| 51st | 53.5% | 39.7% | 2.3% | Bob Filner (108th Congress) |
| 52nd | 34.8% | 58.0% | 1.9% | Duncan L. Hunter |
| 53rd | 50.6% | 39.6% | 4.8% | Susan Davis (108th Congress) |

==== Results by city ====
By municipality

Official outcome by city and unincorporated areas of counties, of which Davis won 258 & Simon won 274.
| City | County | Gray Davis Democratic | | Bill Simon Republican | | Various candidates Other parties | | Margin | | Total Votes |
| City | County | # | % | # | % | # | % | # | % | Total Votes |
|---|---|---|---|---|---|---|---|---|---|---|
| Alameda | Alameda | 12,471 | 59.86% | 5,029 | 24.14% | 3,334 | 16.00% | 7,442 | 35.72% | 20,834 |
| Albany | Alameda | 3,841 | 67.84% | 589 | 10.40% | 1,232 | 21.76% | 3,252 | 57.44% | 5,662 |
| Berkeley | Alameda | 26,565 | 66.00% | 2,821 | 7.01% | 10,863 | 26.99% | 23,744 | 58.99% | 40,249 |
| Dublin | Alameda | 3,309 | 49.87% | 2,723 | 41.04% | 603 | 9.09% | 586 | 8.83% | 6,635 |
| Emeryville | Alameda | 1,191 | 67.59% | 224 | 12.71% | 347 | 19.69% | 967 | 54.88% | 1,762 |
| Fremont | Alameda | 24,193 | 59.99% | 12,277 | 30.44% | 3,859 | 9.57% | 11,916 | 29.55% | 40,329 |
| Hayward | Alameda | 13,740 | 66.72% | 4,920 | 23.89% | 1,933 | 9.39% | 8,820 | 42.83% | 20,593 |
| Livermore | Alameda | 8,986 | 44.58% | 9,164 | 45.46% | 2,007 | 9.96% | -178 | -0.88% | 20,157 |
| Newark | Alameda | 4,781 | 61.98% | 2,148 | 27.85% | 785 | 10.18% | 2,633 | 34.13% | 7,714 |
| Oakland | Alameda | 66,176 | 71.19% | 8,721 | 9.38% | 18,056 | 19.42% | 57,455 | 61.81% | 92,953 |
| Piedmont | Alameda | 2,558 | 54.73% | 1,458 | 31.19% | 658 | 14.08% | 1,100 | 23.53% | 4,674 |
| Pleasanton | Alameda | 9,016 | 46.20% | 8,877 | 45.48% | 1,624 | 8.32% | 139 | 0.71% | 19,517 |
| San Leandro | Alameda | 11,579 | 65.02% | 4,437 | 24.91% | 1,793 | 10.07% | 7,142 | 40.10% | 17,809 |
| Union City | Alameda | 7,770 | 70.97% | 2,335 | 21.33% | 843 | 7.70% | 5,435 | 49.64% | 10,948 |
| Unincorporated Area | Alameda | 19,882 | 58.40% | 10,684 | 31.38% | 3,481 | 10.22% | 9,198 | 27.02% | 34,047 |
| Unincorporated Area | Alpine | 229 | 40.89% | 247 | 44.11% | 84 | 15.00% | -18 | -3.21% | 560 |
| Amador | Amador | 24 | 27.59% | 48 | 55.17% | 15 | 17.24% | -24 | -27.59% | 87 |
| Ione | Amador | 353 | 31.55% | 656 | 58.62% | 110 | 9.83% | -303 | -27.08% | 1,119 |
| Jackson | Amador | 579 | 38.89% | 738 | 49.56% | 172 | 11.55% | -159 | -10.68% | 1,489 |
| Plymouth | Amador | 124 | 39.37% | 158 | 50.16% | 33 | 10.48% | -34 | -10.79% | 315 |
| Sutter Creek | Amador | 377 | 36.50% | 506 | 48.98% | 150 | 14.52% | -129 | -12.49% | 1,033 |
| Unincorporated Area | Amador | 2,980 | 33.35% | 4,891 | 54.74% | 1,064 | 11.91% | -1,911 | -21.39% | 8,935 |
| Biggs | Butte | 115 | 32.58% | 206 | 58.36% | 32 | 9.07% | -91 | -25.78% | 353 |
| Chico | Butte | 5,620 | 33.85% | 7,428 | 44.74% | 3,553 | 21.40% | -1,808 | -10.89% | 16,601 |
| Gridley | Butte | 371 | 36.44% | 543 | 53.34% | 104 | 10.22% | -172 | -16.90% | 1,018 |
| Oroville | Butte | 919 | 35.12% | 1,386 | 52.96% | 312 | 11.92% | -467 | -17.84% | 2,617 |
| Paradise | Butte | 3,204 | 32.57% | 5,457 | 55.47% | 1,176 | 11.95% | -2,253 | -22.90% | 9,837 |
| Unincorporated Area | Butte | 9,208 | 29.68% | 17,686 | 57.00% | 4,135 | 13.33% | -8,478 | -27.32% | 31,029 |
| Angels | Calaveras | 219 | 32.06% | 392 | 57.39% | 72 | 10.54% | -173 | -25.33% | 683 |
| Unincorporated Area | Calaveras | 2,817 | 32.10% | 4,686 | 53.39% | 1,274 | 14.52% | -1,869 | -21.29% | 8,777 |
| Unapportioned absentees | Calaveras | 2,016 | 35.16% | 3,026 | 52.77% | 692 | 12.07% | -1,010 | -17.61% | 5,734 |
| Colusa | Colusa | 331 | 30.39% | 678 | 62.26% | 80 | 7.35% | -347 | -31.86% | 1,089 |
| Williams | Colusa | 121 | 34.18% | 200 | 56.50% | 33 | 9.32% | -79 | -22.32% | 354 |
| Unincorporated Area | Colusa | 791 | 25.26% | 2,118 | 67.62% | 223 | 7.12% | -1,327 | -42.37% | 3,132 |
| Antioch | Contra Costa | 10,740 | 55.24% | 6,737 | 34.65% | 1,966 | 10.11% | 4,003 | 20.59% | 19,443 |
| Brentwood | Contra Costa | 3,500 | 44.76% | 3,682 | 47.08% | 638 | 8.16% | -182 | -2.33% | 7,820 |
| Clayton | Contra Costa | 1,976 | 41.54% | 2,345 | 49.30% | 436 | 9.17% | -369 | -7.76% | 4,757 |
| Concord | Contra Costa | 14,980 | 52.07% | 10,320 | 35.87% | 3,470 | 12.06% | 4,660 | 16.20% | 28,770 |
| Danville | Contra Costa | 6,544 | 40.91% | 8,181 | 51.14% | 1,271 | 7.95% | -1,637 | -10.23% | 15,996 |
| El Cerrito | Contra Costa | 5,838 | 67.27% | 1,371 | 15.80% | 1,469 | 16.93% | 4,467 | 51.47% | 8,678 |
| Hercules | Contra Costa | 2,957 | 67.63% | 995 | 22.76% | 420 | 9.61% | 1,962 | 44.88% | 4,372 |
| Lafayette | Contra Costa | 4,828 | 46.62% | 4,256 | 41.10% | 1,271 | 12.27% | 572 | 5.52% | 10,355 |
| Martinez | Contra Costa | 6,512 | 53.33% | 4,021 | 32.93% | 1,678 | 13.74% | 2,491 | 20.40% | 12,211 |
| Moraga | Contra Costa | 2,876 | 44.55% | 2,922 | 45.26% | 658 | 10.19% | -46 | -0.71% | 6,456 |
| Oakley | Contra Costa | 2,622 | 49.68% | 2,130 | 40.36% | 526 | 9.97% | 492 | 9.32% | 5,278 |
| Orinda | Contra Costa | 3,967 | 46.08% | 3,564 | 41.40% | 1,078 | 12.52% | 403 | 4.68% | 8,609 |
| Pinole | Contra Costa | 3,094 | 60.71% | 1,425 | 27.96% | 577 | 11.32% | 1,669 | 32.75% | 5,096 |
| Pittsburg | Contra Costa | 6,800 | 65.97% | 2,407 | 23.35% | 1,101 | 10.68% | 4,393 | 42.62% | 10,308 |
| Pleasant Hill | Contra Costa | 5,457 | 53.38% | 3,516 | 34.39% | 1,250 | 12.23% | 1,941 | 18.99% | 10,223 |
| Richmond | Contra Costa | 14,909 | 76.72% | 2,372 | 12.21% | 2,153 | 11.08% | 12,537 | 64.51% | 19,434 |
| San Pablo | Contra Costa | 2,369 | 73.14% | 486 | 15.00% | 384 | 11.86% | 1,883 | 58.14% | 3,239 |
| San Ramon | Contra Costa | 6,440 | 45.99% | 6,354 | 45.37% | 1,210 | 8.64% | 86 | 0.61% | 14,004 |
| Walnut Creek | Contra Costa | 12,778 | 49.37% | 10,324 | 39.89% | 2,779 | 10.74% | 2,454 | 9.48% | 25,881 |
| Unincorporated Area | Contra Costa | 21,788 | 49.59% | 17,079 | 38.87% | 5,071 | 11.54% | 4,709 | 10.72% | 43,938 |
| Crescent City | Del Norte | 396 | 48.29% | 315 | 38.41% | 109 | 13.29% | 81 | 9.88% | 820 |
| Unincorporated Area | Del Norte | 2,526 | 42.60% | 2,778 | 46.85% | 626 | 10.56% | -252 | -4.25% | 5,930 |
| Placerville | El Dorado | 1,013 | 33.95% | 1,536 | 51.47% | 435 | 14.58% | -523 | -17.53% | 2,984 |
| South Lake Tahoe | El Dorado | 1,732 | 45.38% | 1,554 | 40.71% | 531 | 13.91% | 178 | 4.66% | 3,817 |
| Unincorporated Area | El Dorado | 13,657 | 27.91% | 29,808 | 60.92% | 5,463 | 11.17% | -16,151 | -33.01% | 48,928 |
| Clovis | Fresno | 4,919 | 27.08% | 12,041 | 66.29% | 1,203 | 6.62% | -7,122 | -39.21% | 18,163 |
| Coalinga | Fresno | 712 | 37.85% | 1,054 | 56.03% | 115 | 6.11% | -342 | -18.18% | 1,881 |
| Firebaugh | Fresno | 370 | 58.08% | 236 | 37.05% | 31 | 4.87% | 134 | 21.04% | 637 |
| Fowler | Fresno | 323 | 45.49% | 351 | 49.44% | 36 | 5.07% | -28 | -3.94% | 710 |
| Fresno | Fresno | 32,107 | 42.11% | 38,508 | 50.50% | 5,631 | 7.39% | -6,401 | -8.40% | 76,246 |
| Huron | Fresno | 337 | 86.41% | 37 | 9.49% | 16 | 4.10% | 300 | 76.92% | 390 |
| Kerman | Fresno | 638 | 49.27% | 604 | 46.64% | 53 | 4.09% | 34 | 2.63% | 1,295 |
| Kingsburg | Fresno | 665 | 25.39% | 1,813 | 69.22% | 141 | 5.38% | -1,148 | -43.83% | 2,619 |
| Mendota | Fresno | 565 | 79.58% | 112 | 15.77% | 33 | 4.65% | 453 | 63.80% | 710 |
| Orange Cove | Fresno | 380 | 67.14% | 121 | 21.38% | 65 | 11.48% | 259 | 45.76% | 566 |
| Parlier | Fresno | 919 | 81.98% | 139 | 12.40% | 63 | 5.62% | 780 | 69.58% | 1,121 |
| Reedley | Fresno | 1,393 | 38.29% | 2,026 | 55.69% | 219 | 6.02% | -633 | -17.40% | 3,638 |
| San Joaquin | Fresno | 133 | 74.30% | 37 | 20.67% | 9 | 5.03% | 96 | 53.63% | 179 |
| Sanger | Fresno | 1,741 | 59.95% | 1,018 | 35.06% | 145 | 4.99% | 723 | 24.90% | 2,904 |
| Selma | Fresno | 1,475 | 49.56% | 1,358 | 45.63% | 143 | 4.81% | 117 | 3.93% | 2,976 |
| Unincorporated Area | Fresno | 12,342 | 29.79% | 26,455 | 63.85% | 2,639 | 6.37% | -14,113 | -34.06% | 41,436 |
| Orland | Glenn | 398 | 29.44% | 823 | 60.87% | 131 | 9.69% | -425 | -31.43% | 1,352 |
| Willows | Glenn | 437 | 31.13% | 844 | 60.11% | 123 | 8.76% | -407 | -28.99% | 1,404 |
| Unincorporated Area | Glenn | 850 | 22.60% | 2,601 | 69.16% | 310 | 8.24% | -1,751 | -46.56% | 3,761 |
| Arcata | Humboldt | 3,087 | 50.48% | 1,122 | 18.35% | 1,906 | 31.17% | 1,965 | 32.13% | 6,115 |
| Blue Lake | Humboldt | 253 | 49.90% | 157 | 30.97% | 97 | 19.13% | 96 | 18.93% | 507 |
| Eureka | Humboldt | 3,860 | 47.85% | 3,161 | 39.18% | 1,046 | 12.97% | 699 | 8.66% | 8,067 |
| Ferndale | Humboldt | 241 | 38.01% | 332 | 52.37% | 61 | 9.62% | -91 | -14.35% | 634 |
| Fortuna | Humboldt | 1,324 | 41.35% | 1,633 | 51.00% | 245 | 7.65% | -309 | -9.65% | 3,202 |
| Rio Dell | Humboldt | 177 | 36.65% | 242 | 50.10% | 64 | 13.25% | -65 | -13.46% | 483 |
| Trinidad | Humboldt | 93 | 60.39% | 40 | 25.97% | 21 | 13.64% | 53 | 34.42% | 154 |
| Unincorporated Area | Humboldt | 10,464 | 44.07% | 9,431 | 39.72% | 3,850 | 16.21% | 1,033 | 4.35% | 23,745 |
| Brawley | Imperial | 1,638 | 55.45% | 1,160 | 39.27% | 156 | 5.28% | 478 | 16.18% | 2,954 |
| Calexico | Imperial | 2,410 | 79.49% | 387 | 12.76% | 235 | 7.75% | 2,023 | 66.72% | 3,032 |
| Calipatria | Imperial | 192 | 58.90% | 110 | 33.74% | 24 | 7.36% | 82 | 25.15% | 326 |
| El Centro | Imperial | 2,759 | 54.74% | 1,938 | 38.45% | 343 | 6.81% | 821 | 16.29% | 5,040 |
| Holtville | Imperial | 384 | 50.13% | 330 | 43.08% | 52 | 6.79% | 54 | 7.05% | 766 |
| Imperial | Imperial | 548 | 43.98% | 615 | 49.36% | 83 | 6.66% | -67 | -5.38% | 1,246 |
| Westmorland | Imperial | 154 | 62.86% | 79 | 32.24% | 12 | 4.90% | 75 | 30.61% | 245 |
| Unincorporated Area | Imperial | 1,698 | 40.96% | 2,186 | 52.73% | 262 | 6.32% | -488 | -11.77% | 4,146 |
| Unapportioned absentees | Imperial | 1,861 | 45.46% | 1,984 | 48.46% | 249 | 6.08% | -123 | -3.00% | 4,094 |
| Bishop | Inyo | 345 | 34.64% | 536 | 53.82% | 115 | 11.55% | -191 | -19.18% | 996 |
| Unincorporated Area | Inyo | 1,769 | 33.43% | 3,031 | 57.28% | 492 | 9.30% | -1,262 | -23.85% | 5,292 |
| Arvin | Kern | 885 | 69.96% | 321 | 25.38% | 59 | 4.66% | 564 | 44.58% | 1,265 |
| Bakersfield | Kern | 18,672 | 33.04% | 34,970 | 61.88% | 2,871 | 5.08% | -16,298 | -28.84% | 56,513 |
| California City | Kern | 574 | 27.35% | 1,295 | 61.70% | 230 | 10.96% | -721 | -34.35% | 2,099 |
| Delano | Kern | 2,836 | 66.29% | 1,239 | 28.96% | 203 | 4.75% | 1,597 | 37.33% | 4,278 |
| Maricopa | Kern | 73 | 28.85% | 152 | 60.08% | 28 | 11.07% | -79 | -31.23% | 253 |
| McFarland | Kern | 613 | 66.63% | 268 | 29.13% | 39 | 4.24% | 345 | 37.50% | 920 |
| Ridgecrest | Kern | 2,000 | 28.21% | 4,450 | 62.77% | 639 | 9.01% | -2,450 | -34.56% | 7,089 |
| Shafter | Kern | 831 | 42.70% | 1,023 | 52.57% | 92 | 4.73% | -192 | -9.87% | 1,946 |
| Taft | Kern | 399 | 22.06% | 1,302 | 71.97% | 108 | 5.97% | -903 | -49.92% | 1,809 |
| Tehachapi | Kern | 607 | 35.81% | 945 | 55.75% | 143 | 8.44% | -338 | -19.94% | 1,695 |
| Wasco | Kern | 1,207 | 52.73% | 963 | 42.07% | 119 | 5.20% | 244 | 10.66% | 2,289 |
| Unincorporated Area | Kern | 17,553 | 30.73% | 35,732 | 62.55% | 3,843 | 6.73% | -18,179 | -31.82% | 57,128 |
| Avenal | Kings | 320 | 53.33% | 236 | 39.33% | 44 | 7.33% | 84 | 14.00% | 600 |
| Corcoran | Kings | 767 | 52.86% | 598 | 41.21% | 86 | 5.93% | 169 | 11.65% | 1,451 |
| Hanford | Kings | 3,409 | 36.19% | 5,456 | 57.93% | 554 | 5.88% | -2,047 | -21.73% | 9,419 |
| Lemoore | Kings | 1,302 | 33.68% | 2,317 | 59.93% | 247 | 6.39% | -1,015 | -26.25% | 3,866 |
| Unincorporated Area | Kings | 1,978 | 33.65% | 3,605 | 61.32% | 296 | 5.03% | -1,627 | -27.67% | 5,879 |
| Clearlake | Lake | 1,468 | 58.56% | 771 | 30.75% | 268 | 10.69% | 697 | 27.80% | 2,507 |
| Lakeport | Lake | 642 | 43.82% | 643 | 43.89% | 180 | 12.29% | -1 | -0.07% | 1,465 |
| Unincorporated Area | Lake | 5,314 | 44.58% | 5,045 | 42.32% | 1,562 | 13.10% | 269 | 2.26% | 11,921 |
| Susanville | Lassen | 805 | 35.35% | 1,260 | 55.34% | 212 | 9.31% | -455 | -19.98% | 2,277 |
| Unincorporated Area | Lassen | 1,624 | 29.98% | 3,252 | 60.03% | 541 | 9.99% | -1,628 | -30.05% | 5,417 |
| Agoura Hills | Los Angeles (Note: California's Supplement to Statement of Vote recorded 59 fewer Davis votes & 30 fewer Simon votes compared to the initial statement of vote.) | 2,113 | 44.13% | 2,270 | 47.41% | 405 | 8.46% | -157 | -3.28% | 4,788 |
| Alhambra | Los Angeles | 7,882 | 59.93% | 4,096 | 31.14% | 1,175 | 8.93% | 3,786 | 28.78% | 13,153 |
| Arcadia | Los Angeles | 5,666 | 35.98% | 8,991 | 57.10% | 1,089 | 6.92% | -3,325 | -21.12% | 15,746 |
| Artesia | Los Angeles | 2,844 | 53.67% | 2,157 | 40.71% | 298 | 5.62% | 687 | 12.96% | 5,299 |
| Avalon | Los Angeles | 310 | 39.14% | 413 | 52.15% | 69 | 8.71% | -103 | -13.01% | 792 |
| Azusa | Los Angeles | 3,145 | 51.65% | 2,367 | 38.87% | 577 | 9.48% | 778 | 12.78% | 6,089 |
| Baldwin Park | Los Angeles | 5,594 | 68.13% | 1,892 | 23.04% | 725 | 8.83% | 3,702 | 45.09% | 8,211 |
| Bell | Los Angeles | 2,476 | 71.38% | 710 | 20.47% | 283 | 8.16% | 1,766 | 50.91% | 3,469 |
| Bell Gardens | Los Angeles | 2,189 | 74.23% | 515 | 17.46% | 245 | 8.31% | 1,674 | 56.77% | 2,949 |
| Bellflower | Los Angeles | 5,143 | 51.18% | 4,092 | 40.72% | 813 | 8.09% | 1,051 | 10.46% | 10,048 |
| Beverly Hills | Los Angeles | 5,416 | 63.61% | 2,587 | 30.38% | 512 | 6.01% | 2,829 | 33.22% | 8,515 |
| Burbank | Los Angeles | 13,816 | 46.90% | 12,861 | 43.66% | 2,783 | 9.45% | 955 | 3.24% | 29,460 |
| Calabasas | Los Angeles | 2,319 | 49.90% | 1,933 | 41.60% | 395 | 8.50% | 386 | 8.31% | 4,647 |
| Carson | Los Angeles | 13,236 | 72.42% | 3,808 | 20.84% | 1,232 | 6.74% | 9,428 | 51.59% | 18,276 |
| Cerritos | Los Angeles | 4,659 | 50.52% | 4,028 | 43.67% | 536 | 5.81% | 631 | 6.84% | 9,223 |
| Claremont | Los Angeles | 5,867 | 46.42% | 5,357 | 42.38% | 1,416 | 11.20% | 510 | 4.03% | 12,640 |
| Commerce | Los Angeles | 1,630 | 78.48% | 301 | 14.49% | 146 | 7.03% | 1,329 | 63.99% | 2,077 |
| Compton | Los Angeles | 9,920 | 85.75% | 811 | 7.01% | 838 | 7.24% | 9,109 | 78.74% | 11,569 |
| Covina | Los Angeles | 3,178 | 41.15% | 3,940 | 51.02% | 605 | 7.83% | -762 | -9.87% | 7,723 |
| Cudahy | Los Angeles | 1,059 | 72.39% | 276 | 18.87% | 128 | 8.75% | 783 | 53.52% | 1,463 |
| Culver City | Los Angeles | 7,043 | 62.00% | 3,036 | 26.73% | 1,280 | 11.27% | 4,007 | 35.28% | 11,359 |
| Diamond Bar | Los Angeles | 4,819 | 42.38% | 5,780 | 50.83% | 772 | 6.79% | -961 | -8.45% | 11,371 |
| Downey | Los Angeles | 8,647 | 46.78% | 8,388 | 45.38% | 1,449 | 7.84% | 259 | 1.40% | 18,484 |
| Duarte | Los Angeles | 2,215 | 49.97% | 1,855 | 41.85% | 363 | 8.19% | 360 | 8.12% | 4,433 |
| El Monte | Los Angeles | 6,918 | 66.09% | 2,596 | 24.80% | 954 | 9.11% | 4,322 | 41.29% | 10,468 |
| El Segundo | Los Angeles | 1,747 | 36.12% | 2,609 | 53.95% | 480 | 9.93% | -862 | -17.82% | 4,836 |
| Gardena | Los Angeles | 6,466 | 67.38% | 2,332 | 24.30% | 799 | 8.33% | 4,134 | 43.08% | 9,597 |
| Glendale | Los Angeles | 11,880 | 45.74% | 11,762 | 45.29% | 2,331 | 8.97% | 118 | 0.45% | 25,973 |
| Glendora | Los Angeles | 3,313 | 29.86% | 6,968 | 62.80% | 814 | 7.34% | -3,655 | -32.94% | 11,095 |
| Hawaiian Gardens | Los Angeles | 659 | 63.98% | 277 | 26.89% | 94 | 9.13% | 382 | 37.09% | 1,030 |
| Hawthorne | Los Angeles | 5,818 | 65.91% | 2,237 | 25.34% | 772 | 8.75% | 3,581 | 40.57% | 8,827 |
| Hermosa Beach | Los Angeles | 2,678 | 44.36% | 2,710 | 44.89% | 649 | 10.75% | -32 | -0.53% | 6,037 |
| Hidden Hills | Los Angeles | 219 | 41.40% | 268 | 50.66% | 42 | 7.94% | -49 | -9.26% | 529 |
| Huntington Park | Los Angeles | 3,502 | 71.98% | 799 | 16.42% | 564 | 11.59% | 2,703 | 55.56% | 4,865 |
| Industry | Los Angeles | 0 | 0.00% | 1 | 50.00% | 1 | 50.00% | 1 | -50.00% (Note: This margin is just Simon's margin over Davis. I counted this as a Simon win since he received more votes than Davis, although this city's result was technically a tie between Simon & American Independent candidate Reinhold Gulke) | 2 |
| Inglewood | Los Angeles | 15,382 | 83.06% | 1,862 | 10.05% | 1,275 | 6.88% | 13,520 | 73.01% | 18,519 |
| Irwindale | Los Angeles | 171 | 70.37% | 49 | 20.16% | 23 | 9.47% | 122 | 50.21% | 243 |
| La Canada Flintridge | Los Angeles | 1,857 | 33.14% | 3,328 | 59.39% | 419 | 7.48% | -1,471 | -26.25% | 5,604 |
| La Habra Heights | Los Angeles | 331 | 21.94% | 1,100 | 72.90% | 78 | 5.17% | -769 | -50.96% | 1,509 |
| La Mirada | Los Angeles | 4,424 | 37.75% | 6,554 | 55.93% | 741 | 6.32% | -2,130 | -18.18% | 11,719 |
| La Puente | Los Angeles | 2,800 | 67.78% | 871 | 21.08% | 460 | 11.14% | 1,929 | 46.70% | 4,131 |
| La Verne | Los Angeles | 2,648 | 36.84% | 3,953 | 54.99% | 587 | 8.17% | -1,305 | -18.16% | 7,188 |
| Lakewood | Los Angeles | 7,898 | 43.07% | 8,884 | 48.45% | 1,556 | 8.49% | -986 | -5.38% | 18,338 |
| Lancaster | Los Angeles | 5,426 | 31.07% | 10,762 | 61.62% | 1,276 | 7.31% | -5,336 | -30.55% | 17,464 |
| Lawndale | Los Angeles | 2,079 | 56.94% | 1,203 | 32.95% | 369 | 10.11% | 876 | 23.99% | 3,651 |
| Lomita | Los Angeles | 1,792 | 41.45% | 2,089 | 48.32% | 442 | 10.22% | -297 | -6.87% | 4,323 |
| Long Beach | Los Angeles | 40,232 | 52.21% | 29,476 | 38.25% | 7,346 | 9.53% | 10,756 | 13.96% | 77,054 |
| Los Angeles | Los Angeles | 401,657 | 62.61% | 175,236 | 27.32% | 64,644 | 10.08% | 226,421 | 35.29% | 641,537 |
| Lynwood | Los Angeles | 4,764 | 79.39% | 789 | 13.15% | 448 | 7.47% | 3,975 | 66.24% | 6,001 |
| Malibu | Los Angeles | 2,041 | 43.99% | 2,088 | 45.00% | 511 | 11.01% | -47 | -1.01% | 4,640 |
| Manhattan Beach | Los Angeles | 6,186 | 41.80% | 7,236 | 48.90% | 1,377 | 9.30% | -1,050 | -7.10% | 14,799 |
| Maywood | Los Angeles | 1,407 | 73.32% | 277 | 14.43% | 235 | 12.25% | 1,130 | 58.88% | 1,919 |
| Monrovia | Los Angeles | 2,767 | 40.93% | 3,296 | 48.76% | 697 | 10.31% | -529 | -7.83% | 6,760 |
| Montebello | Los Angeles | 6,600 | 65.95% | 2,395 | 23.93% | 1,013 | 10.12% | 4,205 | 42.02% | 10,008 |
| Monterey Park | Los Angeles | 6,754 | 64.01% | 3,003 | 28.46% | 794 | 7.53% | 3,751 | 35.55% | 10,551 |
| Norwalk | Los Angeles | 8,533 | 59.67% | 4,633 | 32.40% | 1,135 | 7.94% | 3,900 | 27.27% | 14,301 |
| Palmdale | Los Angeles | 5,686 | 39.51% | 7,664 | 53.25% | 1,042 | 7.24% | -1,978 | -13.74% | 14,392 |
| Palos Verdes Estates | Los Angeles | 1,210 | 29.88% | 2,584 | 63.82% | 255 | 6.30% | -1,374 | -33.93% | 4,049 |
| Paramount | Los Angeles | 3,184 | 67.12% | 1,130 | 23.82% | 430 | 9.06% | 2,054 | 43.30% | 4,744 |
| Pasadena | Los Angeles | 13,206 | 53.40% | 8,900 | 35.99% | 2,624 | 10.61% | 4,306 | 17.41% | 24,730 |
| Pico Rivera | Los Angeles | 7,485 | 68.17% | 2,399 | 21.85% | 1,096 | 9.98% | 5,086 | 46.32% | 10,980 |
| Pomona | Los Angeles | 9,946 | 59.88% | 5,199 | 31.30% | 1,466 | 8.83% | 4,747 | 28.58% | 16,611 |
| Rancho Palos Verdes | Los Angeles | 3,964 | 36.48% | 6,188 | 56.95% | 714 | 6.57% | -2,224 | -20.47% | 10,866 |
| Redondo Beach | Los Angeles | 6,147 | 42.07% | 6,785 | 46.43% | 1,680 | 11.50% | -638 | -4.37% | 14,612 |
| Rolling Hills | Los Angeles | 104 | 17.90% | 440 | 75.73% | 37 | 6.37% | -336 | -57.83% | 581 |
| Rolling Hills Estates | Los Angeles | 655 | 29.68% | 1,415 | 64.11% | 137 | 6.21% | -760 | -34.44% | 2,207 |
| Rosemead | Los Angeles | 3,399 | 66.15% | 1,341 | 26.10% | 398 | 7.75% | 2,058 | 40.05% | 5,138 |
| San Dimas | Los Angeles | 2,510 | 34.48% | 4,204 | 57.75% | 566 | 7.77% | -1,694 | -23.27% | 7,280 |
| San Fernando | Los Angeles | 1,937 | 64.89% | 725 | 24.29% | 323 | 10.82% | 1,212 | 40.60% | 2,985 |
| San Gabriel | Los Angeles | 2,456 | 52.45% | 1,838 | 39.25% | 389 | 8.31% | 618 | 13.20% | 4,683 |
| San Marino | Los Angeles | 1,197 | 28.20% | 2,836 | 66.81% | 212 | 4.99% | -1,639 | -38.61% | 4,245 |
| Santa Clarita | Los Angeles | 11,261 | 32.96% | 20,327 | 59.50% | 2,577 | 7.54% | -9,066 | -26.54% | 34,165 |
| Santa Fe Springs | Los Angeles | 2,012 | 64.28% | 870 | 27.80% | 248 | 7.92% | 1,142 | 36.49% | 3,130 |
| Santa Monica | Los Angeles | 17,896 | 60.86% | 7,452 | 25.34% | 4,057 | 13.80% | 10,444 | 35.52% | 29,405 |
| Sierra Madre | Los Angeles | 1,533 | 36.94% | 2,179 | 52.51% | 438 | 10.55% | -646 | -15.57% | 4,150 |
| Signal Hill | Los Angeles | 996 | 52.23% | 710 | 37.23% | 201 | 10.54% | 286 | 15.00% | 1,907 |
| South El Monte | Los Angeles | 1,675 | 72.54% | 424 | 18.36% | 210 | 9.09% | 1,251 | 54.18% | 2,309 |
| South Gate | Los Angeles | 7,337 | 72.04% | 2,032 | 19.95% | 815 | 8.00% | 5,305 | 52.09% | 10,184 |
| South Pasadena | Los Angeles | 3,726 | 50.34% | 2,808 | 37.94% | 868 | 11.73% | 918 | 12.40% | 7,402 |
| Temple City | Los Angeles | 3,134 | 45.82% | 3,229 | 47.21% | 477 | 6.97% | -95 | -1.39% | 6,840 |
| Torrance | Los Angeles | 14,331 | 40.16% | 18,065 | 50.63% | 3,287 | 9.21% | -3,734 | -10.46% | 35,683 |
| Walnut | Los Angeles | 2,650 | 47.48% | 2,562 | 45.91% | 369 | 6.61% | 88 | 1.58% | 5,581 |
| West Covina | Los Angeles | 7,290 | 50.68% | 5,936 | 41.27% | 1,158 | 8.05% | 1,354 | 9.41% | 14,384 |
| West Hollywood | Los Angeles | 7,685 | 76.76% | 1,380 | 13.78% | 947 | 9.46% | 6,305 | 62.97% | 10,012 |
| Westlake Village | Los Angeles | 834 | 35.99% | 1,296 | 55.93% | 187 | 8.07% | -462 | -19.94% | 2,317 |
| Whittier | Los Angeles | 7,597 | 40.87% | 9,458 | 50.88% | 1,535 | 8.26% | -1,861 | -10.01% | 18,590 |
| Unincorporated Area | Los Angeles | 109,925 | 53.52% | 78,235 | 38.09% | 17,242 | 8.39% | 31,690 | 15.43% | 205,402 |
| Chowchilla | Madera | 478 | 33.43% | 847 | 59.23% | 105 | 7.34% | -369 | -25.80% | 1,430 |
| Madera | Madera | 2,855 | 44.17% | 3,114 | 48.18% | 494 | 7.64% | -259 | -4.01% | 6,463 |
| Unincorporated Area | Madera | 4,884 | 26.72% | 12,037 | 65.86% | 1,355 | 7.41% | -7,153 | -39.14% | 18,276 |
| Belvedere | Marin | 221 | 41.46% | 268 | 50.28% | 44 | 8.26% | -47 | -8.82% | 533 |
| Corte Madera | Marin | 2,108 | 61.35% | 773 | 22.50% | 555 | 16.15% | 1,335 | 38.85% | 3,436 |
| Fairfax | Marin | 1,943 | 62.42% | 425 | 13.65% | 745 | 23.93% | 1,518 | 48.76% | 3,113 |
| Larkspur | Marin | 2,735 | 57.31% | 1,388 | 29.09% | 649 | 13.60% | 1,347 | 28.23% | 4,772 |
| Mill Valley | Marin | 2,242 | 65.06% | 629 | 18.25% | 575 | 16.69% | 1,613 | 46.81% | 3,446 |
| Novato | Marin | 4,864 | 52.74% | 3,185 | 34.54% | 1,173 | 12.72% | 1,679 | 18.21% | 9,222 |
| Ross | Marin | 436 | 44.90% | 409 | 42.12% | 126 | 12.98% | 27 | 2.78% | 971 |
| San Anselmo | Marin | 3,124 | 62.03% | 885 | 17.57% | 1,027 | 20.39% | 2,239 | 44.46% | 5,036 |
| San Rafael | Marin | 9,790 | 56.42% | 4,972 | 28.66% | 2,589 | 14.92% | 4,818 | 27.77% | 17,351 |
| Sausalito | Marin | 1,677 | 56.50% | 783 | 26.38% | 508 | 17.12% | 894 | 30.12% | 2,968 |
| Tiburon | Marin | 1,935 | 52.62% | 1,352 | 36.77% | 390 | 10.61% | 583 | 15.86% | 3,677 |
| Unincorporated Area | Marin | 18,437 | 54.99% | 9,451 | 28.19% | 5,638 | 16.82% | 8,986 | 26.80% | 33,526 |
| Unincorporated Area | Mariposa | 2,126 | 32.78% | 3,720 | 57.36% | 639 | 9.85% | -1,594 | -24.58% | 6,485 |
| Fort Bragg | Mendocino | 932 | 51.15% | 536 | 29.42% | 354 | 19.43% | 396 | 21.73% | 1,822 |
| Point Arena | Mendocino | 50 | 43.10% | 25 | 21.55% | 41 | 35.34% | 25 | 21.55% | 116 |
| Ukiah | Mendocino | 1,731 | 46.97% | 1,298 | 35.22% | 656 | 17.80% | 433 | 11.75% | 3,685 |
| Willits | Mendocino | 501 | 43.87% | 396 | 34.68% | 245 | 21.45% | 105 | 9.19% | 1,142 |
| Unincorporated Area | Mendocino | 7,618 | 42.00% | 6,076 | 33.50% | 4,443 | 24.50% | 1,542 | 8.50% | 18,137 |
| Atwater | Merced | 2,207 | 43.62% | 2,451 | 48.44% | 402 | 7.94% | -244 | -4.82% | 5,060 |
| Dos Palos | Merced | 387 | 43.53% | 421 | 47.36% | 81 | 9.11% | -34 | -3.82% | 889 |
| Gustine | Merced | 602 | 51.02% | 478 | 40.51% | 100 | 8.47% | 124 | 10.51% | 1,180 |
| Livingston | Merced | 960 | 72.07% | 230 | 17.27% | 142 | 10.66% | 730 | 54.80% | 1,332 |
| Los Banos | Merced | 2,322 | 48.80% | 2,037 | 42.81% | 399 | 8.39% | 285 | 5.99% | 4,758 |
| Merced | Merced | 5,787 | 48.20% | 5,243 | 43.67% | 975 | 8.12% | 544 | 4.53% | 12,005 |
| Unincorporated Area | Merced | 5,806 | 37.87% | 8,331 | 54.34% | 1,195 | 7.79% | -2,525 | -16.47% | 15,332 |
| Alturas | Modoc | 332 | 34.98% | 542 | 57.11% | 75 | 7.90% | -210 | -22.13% | 949 |
| Unincorporated Area | Modoc | 568 | 23.36% | 1,619 | 66.57% | 245 | 10.07% | -1,051 | -43.22% | 2,432 |
| Mammoth Lakes | Mono | 499 | 39.42% | 607 | 47.95% | 160 | 12.64% | -108 | -8.53% | 1,266 |
| Unincorporated Area | Mono | 565 | 33.43% | 945 | 55.92% | 180 | 10.65% | -380 | -22.49% | 1,690 |
| Carmel-by-the-Sea | Monterey | 900 | 45.07% | 902 | 45.17% | 195 | 9.76% | -2 | -0.10% | 1,997 |
| Del Rey Oaks | Monterey | 414 | 57.42% | 223 | 30.93% | 84 | 11.65% | 191 | 26.49% | 721 |
| Gonzales | Monterey | 810 | 67.61% | 296 | 24.71% | 92 | 7.68% | 514 | 42.90% | 1,198 |
| Greenfield | Monterey | 1,167 | 71.33% | 348 | 21.27% | 121 | 7.40% | 819 | 50.06% | 1,636 |
| King City | Monterey | 764 | 54.96% | 528 | 37.99% | 98 | 7.05% | 236 | 16.98% | 1,390 |
| Marina | Monterey | 2,475 | 57.57% | 1,419 | 33.01% | 405 | 9.42% | 1,056 | 24.56% | 4,299 |
| Monterey | Monterey | 4,373 | 54.65% | 2,712 | 33.89% | 917 | 11.46% | 1,661 | 20.76% | 8,002 |
| Pacific Grove | Monterey | 3,631 | 57.58% | 1,921 | 30.46% | 754 | 11.96% | 1,710 | 27.12% | 6,306 |
| Salinas | Monterey | 14,489 | 59.27% | 7,877 | 32.22% | 2,078 | 8.50% | 6,612 | 27.05% | 24,444 |
| Sand City | Monterey | 21 | 41.18% | 23 | 45.10% | 7 | 13.73% | -2 | -3.92% | 51 |
| Seaside | Monterey | 3,088 | 64.09% | 1,239 | 25.72% | 491 | 10.19% | 1,849 | 38.38% | 4,818 |
| Soledad | Monterey | 1,236 | 72.32% | 337 | 19.72% | 136 | 7.96% | 899 | 52.60% | 1,709 |
| Unincorporated Area | Monterey | 13,684 | 45.01% | 13,707 | 45.08% | 3,012 | 9.91% | -23 | -0.08% | 30,403 |
| American Canyon | Napa | 1,197 | 60.85% | 583 | 29.64% | 187 | 9.51% | 614 | 31.22% | 1,967 |
| Calistoga | Napa | 488 | 49.95% | 298 | 30.50% | 191 | 19.55% | 190 | 19.45% | 977 |
| Napa | Napa | 7,111 | 49.11% | 5,024 | 34.69% | 2,346 | 16.20% | 2,087 | 14.41% | 14,481 |
| St. Helena | Napa | 740 | 49.56% | 497 | 33.29% | 256 | 17.15% | 243 | 16.28% | 1,493 |
| Yountville | Napa | 555 | 56.17% | 285 | 28.85% | 148 | 14.98% | 270 | 27.33% | 988 |
| Unincorporated Area | Napa | 2,780 | 39.70% | 3,085 | 44.05% | 1,138 | 16.25% | -305 | -4.36% | 7,003 |
| Unapportioned absentees | Napa | 4,645 | 47.58% | 3,711 | 38.01% | 1,407 | 14.41% | 934 | 9.57% | 9,763 |
| Grass Valley | Nevada | 1,471 | 39.50% | 1,730 | 46.46% | 523 | 14.04% | -259 | -6.95% | 3,724 |
| Nevada City | Nevada | 576 | 43.80% | 483 | 36.73% | 256 | 19.47% | 93 | 7.07% | 1,315 |
| Truckee | Nevada | 1,949 | 43.31% | 1,777 | 39.49% | 774 | 17.20% | 172 | 3.82% | 4,500 |
| Unincorporated Area | Nevada | 9,342 | 31.38% | 16,583 | 55.69% | 3,850 | 12.93% | -7,241 | -24.32% | 29,775 |
| Aliso Viejo | Orange | 2,939 | 34.02% | 5,006 | 57.94% | 695 | 8.04% | -2,067 | -23.92% | 8,640 |
| Anaheim | Orange | 18,791 | 38.32% | 26,289 | 53.61% | 3,960 | 8.08% | -7,498 | -15.29% | 49,040 |
| Brea | Orange | 3,082 | 28.96% | 6,787 | 63.77% | 774 | 7.27% | -3,705 | -34.81% | 10,643 |
| Buena Park | Orange | 5,586 | 41.76% | 6,714 | 50.20% | 1,075 | 8.04% | -1,128 | -8.43% | 13,375 |
| Costa Mesa | Orange | 7,270 | 33.28% | 12,432 | 56.91% | 2,144 | 9.81% | -5,162 | -23.63% | 21,846 |
| Cypress | Orange | 4,290 | 35.53% | 6,795 | 56.27% | 991 | 8.21% | -2,505 | -20.74% | 12,076 |
| Dana Point | Orange | 3,386 | 30.65% | 6,791 | 61.47% | 871 | 7.88% | -3,405 | -30.82% | 11,048 |
| Fountain Valley | Orange | 5,439 | 33.25% | 9,829 | 60.08% | 1,091 | 6.67% | -4,390 | -26.84% | 16,359 |
| Fullerton | Orange | 9,355 | 33.76% | 16,212 | 58.51% | 2,140 | 7.72% | -6,857 | -24.75% | 27,707 |
| Garden Grove | Orange | 14,146 | 45.60% | 14,592 | 47.03% | 2,286 | 7.37% | -446 | -1.44% | 31,024 |
| Huntington Beach | Orange | 17,327 | 32.73% | 31,290 | 59.11% | 4,320 | 8.16% | -13,963 | -26.38% | 52,937 |
| Irvine | Orange | 14,625 | 38.38% | 20,291 | 53.25% | 3,189 | 8.37% | -5,666 | -14.87% | 38,105 |
| La Habra | Orange | 3,824 | 35.61% | 6,112 | 56.91% | 803 | 7.48% | -2,288 | -21.31% | 10,739 |
| La Palma | Orange | 1,498 | 38.84% | 2,089 | 54.16% | 270 | 7.00% | -591 | -15.32% | 3,857 |
| Laguna Beach | Orange | 3,959 | 44.18% | 4,035 | 45.02% | 968 | 10.80% | -76 | -0.85% | 8,962 |
| Laguna Hills | Orange | 2,435 | 29.72% | 5,133 | 62.66% | 624 | 7.62% | -2,698 | -32.93% | 8,192 |
| Laguna Niguel | Orange | 5,171 | 31.09% | 10,352 | 62.23% | 1,111 | 6.68% | -5,181 | -31.15% | 16,634 |
| Laguna Woods | Orange | 5,261 | 48.90% | 4,739 | 44.05% | 759 | 7.05% | 522 | 4.85% | 10,759 |
| Lake Forest | Orange | 5,318 | 28.29% | 11,928 | 63.45% | 1,553 | 8.26% | -6,610 | -35.16% | 18,799 |
| Los Alamitos | Orange | 1,074 | 36.82% | 1,591 | 54.54% | 252 | 8.64% | -517 | -17.72% | 2,917 |
| Mission Viejo | Orange | 8,337 | 28.51% | 18,628 | 63.71% | 2,275 | 7.78% | -10,291 | -35.19% | 29,240 |
| Newport Beach | Orange | 6,663 | 24.38% | 18,974 | 69.41% | 1,698 | 6.21% | -12,311 | -45.04% | 27,335 |
| Orange | Orange | 8,605 | 29.89% | 17,919 | 62.24% | 2,267 | 7.87% | -9,314 | -32.35% | 28,791 |
| Placentia | Orange | 3,484 | 31.34% | 6,893 | 62.00% | 740 | 6.66% | -3,409 | -30.66% | 11,117 |
| Rancho Santa Margarita | Orange | 2,834 | 26.13% | 7,171 | 66.13% | 839 | 7.74% | -4,337 | -39.99% | 10,844 |
| San Clemente | Orange | 4,293 | 26.83% | 10,439 | 65.24% | 1,268 | 7.93% | -6,146 | -38.41% | 16,000 |
| San Juan Capistrano | Orange | 2,882 | 27.96% | 6,571 | 63.74% | 856 | 8.30% | -3,689 | -35.78% | 10,309 |
| Santa Ana | Orange | 17,487 | 52.03% | 12,811 | 38.12% | 3,310 | 9.85% | 4,676 | 13.91% | 33,608 |
| Seal Beach | Orange | 4,178 | 39.55% | 5,581 | 52.83% | 806 | 7.63% | -1,403 | -13.28% | 10,565 |
| Stanton | Orange | 2,303 | 47.43% | 2,145 | 44.17% | 408 | 8.40% | 158 | 3.25% | 4,856 |
| Tustin | Orange | 4,134 | 32.82% | 7,407 | 58.81% | 1,054 | 8.37% | -3,273 | -25.99% | 12,595 |
| Villa Park | Orange | 357 | 16.43% | 1,717 | 79.02% | 99 | 4.56% | -1,360 | -62.59% | 2,173 |
| Westminster | Orange | 8,402 | 44.63% | 9,209 | 48.92% | 1,215 | 6.45% | -807 | -4.29% | 18,826 |
| Yorba Linda | Orange | 4,450 | 24.26% | 12,818 | 69.88% | 1,074 | 5.86% | -8,368 | -45.62% | 18,342 |
| Unincorporated Area | Orange | 8,964 | 27.89% | 20,862 | 64.90% | 2,320 | 7.22% | -11,898 | -37.01% | 32,146 |
| Auburn | Placer | 1,644 | 33.47% | 2,682 | 54.60% | 586 | 11.93% | -1,038 | -21.13% | 4,912 |
| Colfax | Placer | 153 | 32.35% | 242 | 51.16% | 78 | 16.49% | -89 | -18.82% | 473 |
| Lincoln | Placer | 1,983 | 31.67% | 3,832 | 61.20% | 446 | 7.12% | -1,849 | -29.53% | 6,261 |
| Loomis | Placer | 582 | 26.36% | 1,417 | 64.18% | 209 | 9.47% | -835 | -37.82% | 2,208 |
| Rocklin | Placer | 3,928 | 27.64% | 9,089 | 63.96% | 1,194 | 8.40% | -5,161 | -36.32% | 14,211 |
| Roseville | Placer | 9,235 | 31.47% | 17,704 | 60.33% | 2,408 | 8.21% | -8,469 | -28.86% | 29,347 |
| Unincorporated Area | Placer | 10,970 | 28.39% | 23,657 | 61.22% | 4,014 | 10.39% | -12,687 | -32.83% | 38,641 |
| Portola | Plumas | 241 | 42.88% | 239 | 42.53% | 82 | 14.59% | 2 | 0.36% | 562 |
| Unincorporated Area | Plumas | 2,357 | 32.31% | 4,071 | 55.80% | 868 | 11.90% | -1,714 | -23.49% | 7,296 |
| Banning | Riverside | 2,965 | 43.61% | 3,362 | 49.45% | 472 | 6.94% | -397 | -5.84% | 6,799 |
| Beaumont | Riverside | 711 | 40.47% | 836 | 47.58% | 210 | 11.95% | -125 | -7.11% | 1,757 |
| Blythe | Riverside | 1,054 | 54.90% | 753 | 39.22% | 113 | 5.89% | 301 | 15.68% | 1,920 |
| Calimesa | Riverside | 773 | 35.90% | 1,178 | 54.71% | 202 | 9.38% | -405 | -18.81% | 2,153 |
| Canyon Lake | Riverside | 799 | 25.17% | 2,225 | 70.10% | 150 | 4.73% | -1,426 | -44.93% | 3,174 |
| Cathedral City | Riverside | 4,035 | 51.67% | 3,313 | 42.43% | 461 | 5.90% | 722 | 9.25% | 7,809 |
| Coachella | Riverside | 1,547 | 78.89% | 310 | 15.81% | 104 | 5.30% | 1,237 | 63.08% | 1,961 |
| Corona | Riverside | 7,352 | 35.46% | 11,847 | 57.14% | 1,536 | 7.41% | -4,495 | -21.68% | 20,735 |
| Desert Hot Springs | Riverside | 1,077 | 45.79% | 1,070 | 45.49% | 205 | 8.72% | 7 | 0.30% | 2,352 |
| Hemet | Riverside | 5,950 | 40.43% | 7,656 | 52.03% | 1,109 | 7.54% | -1,706 | -11.59% | 14,715 |
| Indian Wells | Riverside | 387 | 20.86% | 1,422 | 76.66% | 46 | 2.48% | -1,035 | -55.80% | 1,855 |
| Indio | Riverside | 3,562 | 56.90% | 2,374 | 37.92% | 324 | 5.18% | 1,188 | 18.98% | 6,260 |
| La Quinta | Riverside | 2,393 | 32.98% | 4,480 | 61.74% | 383 | 5.28% | -2,087 | -28.76% | 7,256 |
| Lake Elsinore | Riverside | 1,566 | 37.87% | 2,283 | 55.21% | 286 | 6.92% | -717 | -17.34% | 4,135 |
| Moreno Valley | Riverside | 9,968 | 49.42% | 8,595 | 42.61% | 1,608 | 7.97% | 1,373 | 6.81% | 20,171 |
| Murrieta | Riverside | 4,352 | 29.50% | 9,635 | 65.32% | 764 | 5.18% | -5,283 | -35.81% | 14,751 |
| Norco | Riverside | 1,396 | 31.18% | 2,781 | 62.12% | 300 | 6.70% | -1,385 | -30.94% | 4,477 |
| Palm Desert | Riverside | 4,072 | 34.59% | 7,176 | 60.95% | 525 | 4.46% | -3,104 | -26.37% | 11,773 |
| Palm Springs | Riverside | 7,210 | 55.98% | 4,944 | 38.39% | 726 | 5.64% | 2,266 | 17.59% | 12,880 |
| Perris | Riverside | 1,843 | 54.37% | 1,196 | 35.28% | 351 | 10.35% | 647 | 19.09% | 3,390 |
| Rancho Mirage | Riverside | 1,873 | 36.92% | 3,023 | 59.59% | 177 | 3.49% | -1,150 | -22.67% | 5,073 |
| Riverside | Riverside | 19,421 | 44.41% | 20,759 | 47.46% | 3,556 | 8.13% | -1,338 | -3.06% | 43,736 |
| San Jacinto | Riverside | 1,774 | 40.33% | 2,248 | 51.10% | 377 | 8.57% | -474 | -10.78% | 4,399 |
| Temecula | Riverside | 3,859 | 28.61% | 8,910 | 66.05% | 721 | 5.34% | -5,051 | -37.44% | 13,490 |
| Unincorporated Area | Riverside | 31,906 | 37.37% | 47,064 | 55.12% | 6,407 | 7.50% | -15,158 | -17.75% | 85,377 |
| Citrus Heights | Sacramento | 7,231 | 32.38% | 12,395 | 55.50% | 2,709 | 12.13% | -5,164 | -23.12% | 22,335 |
| Elk Grove | Sacramento | 8,815 | 38.25% | 11,791 | 51.17% | 2,439 | 10.58% | -2,976 | -12.91% | 23,045 |
| Folsom | Sacramento | 4,828 | 28.30% | 10,531 | 61.73% | 1,702 | 9.98% | -5,703 | -33.43% | 17,061 |
| Galt | Sacramento | 1,849 | 38.43% | 2,446 | 50.84% | 516 | 10.73% | -597 | -12.41% | 4,811 |
| Isleton | Sacramento | 135 | 59.73% | 60 | 26.55% | 31 | 13.72% | 75 | 33.19% | 226 |
| Sacramento | Sacramento | 48,492 | 52.36% | 30,409 | 32.84% | 13,703 | 14.80% | 18,083 | 19.53% | 92,604 |
| Unincorporated Area | Sacramento | 57,793 | 36.98% | 79,824 | 51.07% | 18,679 | 11.95% | -22,031 | -14.10% | 156,296 |
| Hollister | San Benito | 3,722 | 56.58% | 2,262 | 34.39% | 594 | 9.03% | 1,460 | 22.20% | 6,578 |
| San Juan Bautista | San Benito | 260 | 58.17% | 130 | 29.08% | 57 | 12.75% | 130 | 29.08% | 447 |
| Unincorporated Area | San Benito | 2,067 | 38.65% | 2,771 | 51.81% | 510 | 9.54% | -704 | -13.16% | 5,348 |
| Adelanto | San Bernardino | 795 | 41.47% | 933 | 48.67% | 189 | 9.86% | -138 | -7.20% | 1,917 |
| Apple Valley | San Bernardino | 3,411 | 25.75% | 8,729 | 65.90% | 1,106 | 8.35% | -5,318 | -40.15% | 13,246 |
| Barstow | San Bernardino | 1,663 | 45.25% | 1,622 | 44.14% | 390 | 10.61% | 41 | 1.12% | 3,675 |
| Big Bear Lake | San Bernardino | 502 | 25.68% | 1,245 | 63.68% | 208 | 10.64% | -743 | -38.01% | 1,955 |
| Chino | San Bernardino | 4,004 | 41.02% | 4,987 | 51.09% | 771 | 7.90% | -983 | -10.07% | 9,762 |
| Chino Hills | San Bernardino | 4,629 | 36.43% | 7,261 | 57.14% | 817 | 6.43% | -2,632 | -20.71% | 12,707 |
| Colton | San Bernardino | 3,857 | 65.26% | 1,669 | 28.24% | 384 | 6.50% | 2,188 | 37.02% | 5,910 |
| Fontana | San Bernardino | 8,266 | 54.98% | 5,626 | 37.42% | 1,143 | 7.60% | 2,640 | 17.56% | 15,035 |
| Grand Terrace | San Bernardino | 1,022 | 40.30% | 1,304 | 51.42% | 210 | 8.28% | -282 | -11.12% | 2,536 |
| Hesperia | San Bernardino | 3,432 | 29.81% | 6,933 | 60.22% | 1,148 | 9.97% | -3,501 | -30.41% | 11,513 |
| Highland | San Bernardino | 3,425 | 44.27% | 3,607 | 46.62% | 705 | 9.11% | -182 | -2.35% | 7,737 |
| Loma Linda | San Bernardino | 1,356 | 40.62% | 1,753 | 52.52% | 229 | 6.86% | -397 | -11.89% | 3,338 |
| Montclair | San Bernardino | 2,303 | 52.89% | 1,632 | 37.48% | 419 | 9.62% | 671 | 15.41% | 4,354 |
| Needles | San Bernardino | 395 | 49.07% | 348 | 43.23% | 62 | 7.70% | 47 | 5.84% | 805 |
| Ontario | San Bernardino | 9,270 | 48.73% | 8,149 | 42.84% | 1,605 | 8.44% | 1,121 | 5.89% | 19,024 |
| Rancho Cucamonga | San Bernardino | 9,733 | 36.87% | 14,722 | 55.77% | 1,941 | 7.35% | -4,989 | -18.90% | 26,396 |
| Redlands | San Bernardino | 6,786 | 39.58% | 8,946 | 52.18% | 1,411 | 8.23% | -2,160 | -12.60% | 17,143 |
| Rialto | San Bernardino | 6,587 | 61.80% | 3,284 | 30.81% | 788 | 7.39% | 3,303 | 30.99% | 10,659 |
| San Bernardino | San Bernardino | 12,345 | 55.57% | 8,006 | 36.04% | 1,864 | 8.39% | 4,339 | 19.53% | 22,215 |
| Twentynine Palms | San Bernardino | 782 | 34.68% | 1,181 | 52.37% | 292 | 12.95% | -399 | -17.69% | 2,255 |
| Upland | San Bernardino | 5,723 | 35.74% | 9,090 | 56.77% | 1,198 | 7.48% | -3,367 | -21.03% | 16,011 |
| Victorville | San Bernardino | 4,035 | 38.74% | 5,590 | 53.67% | 791 | 7.59% | -1,555 | -14.93% | 10,416 |
| Yucaipa | San Bernardino | 3,369 | 34.43% | 5,463 | 55.82% | 954 | 9.75% | -2,094 | -21.40% | 9,786 |
| Yucca Valley | San Bernardino | 1,346 | 32.87% | 2,337 | 57.07% | 412 | 10.06% | -991 | -24.20% | 4,095 |
| Unincorporated Area | San Bernardino | 17,721 | 34.98% | 28,096 | 55.47% | 4,837 | 9.55% | -10,375 | -20.48% | 50,654 |
| Carlsbad | San Diego | 9,605 | 35.23% | 15,711 | 57.63% | 1,947 | 7.14% | -6,106 | -22.40% | 27,263 |
| Chula Vista | San Diego | 16,943 | 47.14% | 16,532 | 46.00% | 2,465 | 6.86% | 411 | 1.14% | 35,940 |
| Coronado | San Diego | 1,886 | 28.98% | 4,241 | 65.17% | 381 | 5.85% | -2,355 | -36.19% | 6,508 |
| Del Mar | San Diego | 867 | 47.15% | 830 | 45.13% | 142 | 7.72% | 37 | 2.01% | 1,839 |
| El Cajon | San Diego | 6,170 | 34.73% | 10,120 | 56.96% | 1,476 | 8.31% | -3,950 | -22.23% | 17,766 |
| Encinitas | San Diego | 8,232 | 43.37% | 8,951 | 47.16% | 1,798 | 9.47% | -719 | -3.79% | 18,981 |
| Escondido | San Diego | 7,735 | 31.08% | 15,374 | 61.78% | 1,776 | 7.14% | -7,639 | -30.70% | 24,885 |
| Imperial Beach | San Diego | 1,819 | 44.31% | 1,857 | 45.24% | 429 | 10.45% | -38 | -0.93% | 4,105 |
| La Mesa | San Diego | 6,575 | 42.13% | 7,618 | 48.81% | 1,414 | 9.06% | -1,043 | -6.68% | 15,607 |
| Lemon Grove | San Diego | 2,493 | 45.09% | 2,576 | 46.59% | 460 | 8.32% | -83 | -1.50% | 5,529 |
| National City | San Diego | 4,400 | 61.75% | 2,135 | 29.96% | 590 | 8.28% | 2,265 | 31.79% | 7,125 |
| Oceanside | San Diego | 13,455 | 36.79% | 20,130 | 55.04% | 2,988 | 8.17% | -6,675 | -18.25% | 36,573 |
| Poway | San Diego | 4,649 | 30.30% | 9,685 | 63.12% | 1,011 | 6.59% | -5,036 | -32.82% | 15,345 |
| San Diego | San Diego | 132,602 | 47.87% | 122,209 | 44.11% | 22,217 | 8.02% | 10,393 | 3.75% | 277,028 |
| San Marcos | San Diego | 4,244 | 33.41% | 7,544 | 59.39% | 915 | 7.20% | -3,300 | -25.98% | 12,703 |
| Santee | San Diego | 4,848 | 33.93% | 8,289 | 58.01% | 1,152 | 8.06% | -3,441 | -24.08% | 14,289 |
| Solana Beach | San Diego | 1,946 | 41.10% | 2,503 | 52.86% | 286 | 6.04% | -557 | -11.76% | 4,735 |
| Vista | San Diego | 5,466 | 32.95% | 9,794 | 59.05% | 1,327 | 8.00% | -4,328 | -26.09% | 16,587 |
| Unincorporated Area | San Diego | 34,343 | 29.01% | 75,996 | 64.19% | 8,060 | 6.81% | -41,653 | -35.18% | 118,399 |
| San Francisco | San Francisco | 143,102 | 66.21% | 33,214 | 15.37% | 39,831 | 18.43% | 109,888 | 50.84% | 216,147 |
| Escalon | San Joaquin (Note: California's Supplement to Statement of Vote recorded 10 additional Davis votes & 26 additional Simon votes compared to the initial statement of vote.) | 705 | 38.55% | 983 | 53.75% | 141 | 7.71% | -278 | -15.20% | 1,829 |
| Lathrop | San Joaquin | 955 | 51.90% | 686 | 37.28% | 199 | 10.82% | 269 | 14.62% | 1,840 |
| Lodi | San Joaquin | 4,894 | 32.68% | 8,786 | 58.67% | 1,296 | 8.65% | -3,892 | -25.99% | 14,976 |
| Manteca | San Joaquin | 4,784 | 43.33% | 5,201 | 47.10% | 1,057 | 9.57% | -417 | -3.78% | 11,042 |
| Ripon | San Joaquin | 930 | 27.49% | 2,247 | 66.42% | 206 | 6.09% | -1,317 | -38.93% | 3,383 |
| Stockton | San Joaquin | 24,132 | 52.30% | 17,578 | 38.09% | 4,434 | 9.61% | 6,554 | 14.20% | 46,144 |
| Tracy | San Joaquin | 5,760 | 45.31% | 5,685 | 44.72% | 1,268 | 9.97% | 75 | 0.59% | 12,713 |
| Unincorporated Area | San Joaquin | 11,597 | 36.76% | 17,099 | 54.19% | 2,855 | 9.05% | -5,502 | -17.44% | 31,551 |
| Arroyo Grande | San Luis Obispo | 2,309 | 36.16% | 3,582 | 56.09% | 495 | 7.75% | -1,273 | -19.93% | 6,386 |
| Atascadero | San Luis Obispo | 2,741 | 32.07% | 4,932 | 57.71% | 873 | 10.22% | -2,191 | -25.64% | 8,546 |
| El Paso de Robles | San Luis Obispo | 2,162 | 31.14% | 4,236 | 61.01% | 545 | 7.85% | -2,074 | -29.87% | 6,943 |
| Grover Beach | San Luis Obispo | 1,416 | 42.42% | 1,591 | 47.66% | 331 | 9.92% | -175 | -5.24% | 3,338 |
| Morro Bay | San Luis Obispo | 1,822 | 43.47% | 1,844 | 44.00% | 525 | 12.53% | -22 | -0.52% | 4,191 |
| Pismo Beach | San Luis Obispo | 1,268 | 37.03% | 1,891 | 55.23% | 265 | 7.74% | -623 | -18.20% | 3,424 |
| San Luis Obispo | San Luis Obispo | 5,991 | 45.02% | 5,512 | 41.42% | 1,804 | 13.56% | 479 | 3.60% | 13,307 |
| Unincorporated Area | San Luis Obispo | 12,023 | 33.85% | 19,964 | 56.20% | 3,533 | 9.95% | -7,941 | -22.36% | 35,520 |
| Atherton | San Mateo | 1,003 | 35.34% | 1,607 | 56.62% | 228 | 8.03% | -604 | -21.28% | 2,838 |
| Belmont | San Mateo | 4,609 | 57.13% | 2,443 | 30.28% | 1,015 | 12.58% | 2,166 | 26.85% | 8,067 |
| Brisbane | San Mateo | 704 | 60.53% | 218 | 18.74% | 241 | 20.72% | 486 | 41.79% | 1,163 |
| Burlingame | San Mateo | 4,274 | 53.15% | 2,771 | 34.46% | 997 | 12.40% | 1,503 | 18.69% | 8,042 |
| Colma | San Mateo | 169 | 68.98% | 45 | 18.37% | 31 | 12.65% | 124 | 50.61% | 245 |
| Daly City | San Mateo | 10,903 | 69.79% | 3,343 | 21.40% | 1,376 | 8.81% | 7,560 | 48.39% | 15,622 |
| East Palo Alto | San Mateo | 2,332 | 75.59% | 301 | 9.76% | 452 | 14.65% | 2,031 | 65.83% | 3,085 |
| Foster City | San Mateo | 4,166 | 57.36% | 2,382 | 32.80% | 715 | 9.84% | 1,784 | 24.56% | 7,263 |
| Half Moon Bay | San Mateo | 1,699 | 48.98% | 1,210 | 34.88% | 560 | 16.14% | 489 | 14.10% | 3,469 |
| Hillsborough | San Mateo | 1,547 | 37.41% | 2,293 | 55.45% | 295 | 7.13% | -746 | -18.04% | 4,135 |
| Menlo Park | San Mateo | 5,601 | 56.84% | 3,022 | 30.67% | 1,231 | 12.49% | 2,579 | 26.17% | 9,854 |
| Millbrae | San Mateo | 3,109 | 54.67% | 1,998 | 35.13% | 580 | 10.20% | 1,111 | 19.54% | 5,687 |
| Pacifica | San Mateo | 7,435 | 60.94% | 2,866 | 23.49% | 1,900 | 15.57% | 4,569 | 37.45% | 12,201 |
| Portola Valley | San Mateo | 1,000 | 48.80% | 815 | 39.78% | 234 | 11.42% | 185 | 9.03% | 2,049 |
| Redwood City | San Mateo | 9,316 | 56.49% | 5,075 | 30.77% | 2,100 | 12.73% | 4,241 | 25.72% | 16,491 |
| San Bruno | San Mateo | 5,493 | 62.01% | 2,392 | 27.00% | 973 | 10.98% | 3,101 | 35.01% | 8,858 |
| San Carlos | San Mateo | 5,080 | 54.39% | 3,133 | 33.54% | 1,127 | 12.07% | 1,947 | 20.85% | 9,340 |
| San Mateo | San Mateo | 13,389 | 57.94% | 6,979 | 30.20% | 2,742 | 11.86% | 6,410 | 27.74% | 23,110 |
| South San Francisco | San Mateo | 7,537 | 66.14% | 2,664 | 23.38% | 1,194 | 10.48% | 4,873 | 42.76% | 11,395 |
| Woodside | San Mateo | 908 | 42.17% | 1,014 | 47.10% | 231 | 10.73% | -106 | -4.92% | 2,153 |
| Unincorporated Area | San Mateo | 9,529 | 55.60% | 4,926 | 28.74% | 2,684 | 15.66% | 4,603 | 26.86% | 17,139 |
| Buellton | Santa Barbara | 539 | 38.92% | 744 | 53.72% | 102 | 7.36% | -205 | -14.80% | 1,385 |
| Carpinteria | Santa Barbara | 1,986 | 51.00% | 1,531 | 39.32% | 377 | 9.68% | 455 | 11.68% | 3,894 |
| Goleta | Santa Barbara | 4,640 | 47.52% | 4,103 | 42.02% | 1,021 | 10.46% | 537 | 5.50% | 9,764 |
| Guadalupe | Santa Barbara | 671 | 62.19% | 316 | 29.29% | 92 | 8.53% | 355 | 32.90% | 1,079 |
| Lompoc | Santa Barbara | 3,696 | 43.59% | 4,216 | 49.72% | 567 | 6.69% | -520 | -6.13% | 8,479 |
| Santa Barbara | Santa Barbara | 14,482 | 54.34% | 8,800 | 33.02% | 3,367 | 12.63% | 5,682 | 21.32% | 26,649 |
| Santa Maria | Santa Barbara | 5,403 | 39.70% | 7,392 | 54.31% | 815 | 5.99% | -1,989 | -14.61% | 13,610 |
| Solvang | Santa Barbara | 722 | 32.88% | 1,338 | 60.93% | 136 | 6.19% | -616 | -28.05% | 2,196 |
| Unincorporated Area | Santa Barbara | 18,602 | 39.22% | 24,392 | 51.43% | 4,436 | 9.35% | -5,790 | -12.21% | 47,430 |
| Campbell | Santa Clara | 4,729 | 53.24% | 3,013 | 33.92% | 1,141 | 12.84% | 1,716 | 19.32% | 8,883 |
| Cupertino | Santa Clara | 7,055 | 55.16% | 4,288 | 33.53% | 1,447 | 11.31% | 2,767 | 21.63% | 12,790 |
| Gilroy | Santa Clara | 4,323 | 55.54% | 2,626 | 33.74% | 835 | 10.73% | 1,697 | 21.80% | 7,784 |
| Los Altos | Santa Clara | 6,178 | 50.49% | 4,683 | 38.27% | 1,375 | 11.24% | 1,495 | 12.22% | 12,236 |
| Los Altos Hills | Santa Clara | 1,543 | 42.72% | 1,675 | 46.37% | 394 | 10.91% | -132 | -3.65% | 3,612 |
| Los Gatos | Santa Clara | 4,738 | 48.12% | 3,955 | 40.16% | 1,154 | 11.72% | 783 | 7.95% | 9,847 |
| Milpitas | Santa Clara | 6,477 | 60.82% | 3,259 | 30.60% | 914 | 8.58% | 3,218 | 30.22% | 10,650 |
| Monte Sereno | Santa Clara | 581 | 41.09% | 669 | 47.31% | 164 | 11.60% | -88 | -6.22% | 1,414 |
| Morgan Hill | Santa Clara | 3,613 | 46.35% | 3,387 | 43.45% | 795 | 10.20% | 226 | 2.90% | 7,795 |
| Mountain View | Santa Clara | 10,102 | 59.12% | 4,316 | 25.26% | 2,670 | 15.63% | 5,786 | 33.86% | 17,088 |
| Palo Alto | Santa Clara | 13,774 | 64.84% | 4,395 | 20.69% | 3,074 | 14.47% | 9,379 | 44.15% | 21,243 |
| San Jose | Santa Clara | 92,296 | 56.16% | 52,357 | 31.86% | 19,706 | 11.99% | 39,939 | 24.30% | 164,359 |
| Santa Clara | Santa Clara | 11,682 | 56.66% | 6,209 | 30.12% | 2,725 | 13.22% | 5,473 | 26.55% | 20,616 |
| Saratoga | Santa Clara | 4,762 | 44.63% | 4,918 | 46.09% | 990 | 9.28% | -156 | -1.46% | 10,670 |
| Sunnyvale | Santa Clara | 15,549 | 56.50% | 8,484 | 30.83% | 3,487 | 12.67% | 7,065 | 25.67% | 27,520 |
| Unincorporated Area | Santa Clara | 11,997 | 50.23% | 8,628 | 36.12% | 3,259 | 13.65% | 3,369 | 14.11% | 23,884 |
| Capitola | Santa Cruz | 1,893 | 58.70% | 829 | 25.71% | 503 | 15.60% | 1,064 | 32.99% | 3,225 |
| Santa Cruz | Santa Cruz | 12,148 | 60.09% | 3,328 | 16.46% | 4,740 | 23.45% | 8,820 | 43.63% | 20,216 |
| Scotts Valley | Santa Cruz | 1,892 | 46.84% | 1,650 | 40.85% | 497 | 12.31% | 242 | 5.99% | 4,039 |
| Watsonville | Santa Cruz | 3,945 | 62.91% | 1,659 | 26.46% | 667 | 10.64% | 2,286 | 36.45% | 6,271 |
| Unincorporated Area | Santa Cruz | 23,591 | 53.82% | 13,132 | 29.96% | 7,109 | 16.22% | 10,459 | 23.86% | 43,832 |
| Anderson | Shasta | 677 | 39.61% | 853 | 49.91% | 179 | 10.47% | -176 | -10.30% | 1,709 |
| Redding | Shasta | 7,738 | 32.69% | 13,707 | 57.90% | 2,227 | 9.41% | -5,969 | -25.22% | 23,672 |
| Shasta Lake | Shasta | 881 | 40.03% | 1,095 | 49.75% | 225 | 10.22% | -214 | -9.72% | 2,201 |
| Unincorporated Area | Shasta | 5,996 | 28.58% | 12,970 | 61.83% | 2,011 | 9.59% | -6,974 | -33.25% | 20,977 |
| Loyalton | Sierra | 57 | 29.84% | 105 | 54.97% | 29 | 15.18% | -48 | -25.13% | 191 |
| Unincorporated Area | Sierra | 190 | 26.84% | 420 | 59.32% | 98 | 13.84% | -230 | -32.49% | 708 |
| Unapportioned absentees | Sierra | 173 | 32.10% | 280 | 51.95% | 86 | 15.96% | -107 | -19.85% | 539 |
| Dorris | Siskiyou | 64 | 31.07% | 130 | 63.11% | 12 | 5.83% | -66 | -32.04% | 206 |
| Dunsmuir | Siskiyou | 357 | 51.66% | 242 | 35.02% | 92 | 13.31% | 115 | 16.64% | 691 |
| Etna | Siskiyou | 67 | 23.67% | 194 | 68.55% | 22 | 7.77% | -127 | -44.88% | 283 |
| Fort Jones | Siskiyou | 47 | 21.17% | 156 | 70.27% | 19 | 8.56% | -109 | -49.10% | 222 |
| Montague | Siskiyou | 73 | 20.86% | 236 | 67.43% | 41 | 11.71% | -163 | -46.57% | 350 |
| Mt. Shasta | Siskiyou | 543 | 46.37% | 475 | 40.56% | 153 | 13.07% | 68 | 5.81% | 1,171 |
| Tulelake | Siskiyou | 56 | 28.28% | 127 | 64.14% | 15 | 7.58% | -71 | -35.86% | 198 |
| Weed | Siskiyou | 453 | 58.00% | 270 | 34.57% | 58 | 7.43% | 183 | 23.43% | 781 |
| Yreka | Siskiyou | 699 | 28.05% | 1,565 | 62.80% | 228 | 9.15% | -866 | -34.75% | 2,492 |
| Unincorporated Area | Siskiyou | 2,613 | 28.39% | 5,717 | 62.11% | 875 | 9.51% | -3,104 | -33.72% | 9,205 |
| Benicia | Solano | 4,578 | 52.73% | 2,993 | 34.47% | 1,111 | 12.80% | 1,585 | 18.26% | 8,682 |
| Dixon | Solano | 1,666 | 39.44% | 2,135 | 50.54% | 423 | 10.01% | -469 | -11.10% | 4,224 |
| Fairfield | Solano | 9,972 | 51.67% | 7,613 | 39.45% | 1,713 | 8.88% | 2,359 | 12.22% | 19,298 |
| Rio Vista | Solano | 826 | 42.45% | 948 | 48.72% | 172 | 8.84% | -122 | -6.27% | 1,946 |
| Suisun City | Solano | 2,862 | 58.67% | 1,577 | 32.33% | 439 | 9.00% | 1,285 | 26.34% | 4,878 |
| Vacaville | Solano | 9,266 | 44.95% | 9,485 | 46.02% | 1,861 | 9.03% | -219 | -1.06% | 20,612 |
| Vallejo | Solano | 15,315 | 65.91% | 5,603 | 24.11% | 2,318 | 9.98% | 9,712 | 41.80% | 23,236 |
| Unincorporated Area | Solano | 1,900 | 33.66% | 3,162 | 56.01% | 583 | 10.33% | -1,262 | -22.36% | 5,645 |
| Cloverdale | Sonoma | 1,064 | 49.56% | 703 | 32.74% | 380 | 17.70% | 361 | 16.81% | 2,147 |
| Cotati | Sonoma | 1,118 | 54.11% | 503 | 24.35% | 445 | 21.54% | 615 | 29.77% | 2,066 |
| Healdsburg | Sonoma | 1,879 | 48.64% | 1,201 | 31.09% | 783 | 20.27% | 678 | 17.55% | 3,863 |
| Petaluma | Sonoma | 9,468 | 53.61% | 5,154 | 29.18% | 3,039 | 17.21% | 4,314 | 24.43% | 17,661 |
| Rohnert Park | Sonoma | 5,297 | 52.09% | 3,218 | 31.65% | 1,653 | 16.26% | 2,079 | 20.45% | 10,168 |
| Santa Rosa | Sonoma | 22,226 | 50.73% | 13,317 | 30.40% | 8,267 | 18.87% | 8,909 | 20.34% | 43,810 |
| Sebastopol | Sonoma | 1,621 | 52.75% | 573 | 18.65% | 879 | 28.60% | 1,048 | 34.10% | 3,073 |
| Sonoma | Sonoma | 2,191 | 52.80% | 1,200 | 28.92% | 759 | 18.29% | 991 | 23.88% | 4,150 |
| Windsor | Sonoma | 3,340 | 47.73% | 2,621 | 37.46% | 1,036 | 14.81% | 719 | 10.28% | 6,997 |
| Unincorporated Area | Sonoma | 24,875 | 48.69% | 14,918 | 29.20% | 11,296 | 22.11% | 9,957 | 19.49% | 51,089 |
| Ceres | Stanislaus | 3,321 | 51.38% | 2,613 | 40.42% | 530 | 8.20% | 708 | 10.95% | 6,464 |
| Hughson | Stanislaus | 406 | 42.65% | 457 | 48.00% | 89 | 9.35% | -51 | -5.36% | 952 |
| Modesto | Stanislaus | 13,991 | 45.05% | 14,250 | 45.88% | 2,816 | 9.07% | -259 | -0.83% | 31,057 |
| Newman | Stanislaus | 618 | 46.96% | 552 | 41.95% | 146 | 11.09% | 66 | 5.02% | 1,316 |
| Oakdale | Stanislaus | 820 | 36.67% | 1,201 | 53.71% | 215 | 9.62% | -381 | -17.04% | 2,236 |
| Patterson | Stanislaus | 1,159 | 55.19% | 749 | 35.67% | 192 | 9.14% | 410 | 19.52% | 2,100 |
| Riverbank | Stanislaus | 1,213 | 46.26% | 1,182 | 45.08% | 227 | 8.66% | 31 | 1.18% | 2,622 |
| Turlock | Stanislaus | 5,201 | 40.90% | 6,540 | 51.43% | 975 | 7.67% | -1,339 | -10.53% | 12,716 |
| Waterford | Stanislaus | 498 | 42.20% | 563 | 47.71% | 119 | 10.08% | -65 | -5.51% | 1,180 |
| Unincorporated Area | Stanislaus | 6,606 | 37.41% | 9,551 | 54.09% | 1,500 | 8.50% | -2,945 | -16.68% | 17,657 |
| Unapportioned absentees | Stanislaus | 8,075 | 45.13% | 8,433 | 47.13% | 1,386 | 7.75% | -358 | -2.00% | 17,894 |
| Live Oak | Sutter | 370 | 43.68% | 392 | 46.28% | 85 | 10.04% | -22 | -2.60% | 847 |
| Yuba City | Sutter | 3,354 | 33.94% | 5,770 | 58.38% | 759 | 7.68% | -2,416 | -24.45% | 9,883 |
| Unincorporated Area | Sutter | 2,058 | 23.82% | 5,862 | 67.85% | 720 | 8.33% | -3,804 | -44.03% | 8,640 |
| Corning | Tehama | 305 | 34.08% | 489 | 54.64% | 101 | 11.28% | -184 | -20.56% | 895 |
| Red Bluff | Tehama | 763 | 37.92% | 1,037 | 51.54% | 212 | 10.54% | -274 | -13.62% | 2,012 |
| Tehama | Tehama | 31 | 30.10% | 64 | 62.14% | 8 | 7.77% | -33 | -32.04% | 103 |
| Unincorporated Area | Tehama | 2,419 | 29.75% | 4,993 | 61.41% | 718 | 8.83% | -2,574 | -31.66% | 8,130 |
| Unapportioned absentees | Tehama | 1,482 | 34.85% | 2,427 | 57.08% | 343 | 8.07% | -945 | -22.22% | 4,252 |
| Unincorporated Area | Trinity | 1,833 | 37.23% | 2,421 | 49.17% | 670 | 13.61% | -588 | -11.94% | 4,924 |
| Dinuba | Tulare | 1,123 | 48.03% | 1,092 | 46.71% | 123 | 5.26% | 31 | 1.33% | 2,338 |
| Exeter | Tulare | 543 | 30.47% | 1,105 | 62.01% | 134 | 7.52% | -562 | -31.54% | 1,782 |
| Farmersville | Tulare | 431 | 56.19% | 265 | 34.55% | 71 | 9.26% | 166 | 21.64% | 767 |
| Lindsay | Tulare | 512 | 54.88% | 338 | 36.23% | 83 | 8.90% | 174 | 18.65% | 933 |
| Porterville | Tulare | 2,387 | 39.83% | 3,172 | 52.93% | 434 | 7.24% | -785 | -13.10% | 5,993 |
| Tulare | Tulare | 2,394 | 36.71% | 3,748 | 57.48% | 379 | 5.81% | -1,354 | -20.76% | 6,521 |
| Visalia | Tulare | 6,249 | 30.47% | 12,921 | 63.00% | 1,340 | 6.53% | -6,672 | -32.53% | 20,510 |
| Woodlake | Tulare | 381 | 59.91% | 180 | 28.30% | 75 | 11.79% | 201 | 31.60% | 636 |
| Unincorporated Area | Tulare | 7,274 | 31.60% | 14,351 | 62.35% | 1,392 | 6.05% | -7,077 | -30.75% | 23,017 |
| Sonora | Tuolumne | 597 | 45.43% | 553 | 42.09% | 164 | 12.48% | 44 | 3.35% | 1,314 |
| Unincorporated Area | Tuolumne | 6,249 | 37.58% | 8,698 | 52.31% | 1,680 | 10.10% | -2,449 | -14.73% | 16,627 |
| Camarillo | Ventura | 7,561 | 40.13% | 9,897 | 52.53% | 1,383 | 7.34% | -2,336 | -12.40% | 18,841 |
| Fillmore | Ventura | 1,551 | 50.62% | 1,264 | 41.25% | 249 | 8.13% | 287 | 9.37% | 3,064 |
| Moorpark | Ventura | 2,953 | 38.87% | 4,048 | 53.28% | 597 | 7.86% | -1,095 | -14.41% | 7,598 |
| Ojai | Ventura | 1,330 | 48.74% | 1,036 | 37.96% | 363 | 13.30% | 294 | 10.77% | 2,729 |
| Oxnard | Ventura | 14,599 | 56.14% | 8,338 | 32.07% | 3,066 | 11.79% | 6,261 | 24.08% | 26,003 |
| Port Hueneme | Ventura | 1,940 | 50.44% | 1,485 | 38.61% | 421 | 10.95% | 455 | 11.83% | 3,846 |
| San Buenaventura | Ventura | 15,681 | 46.16% | 14,148 | 41.64% | 4,145 | 12.20% | 1,533 | 4.51% | 33,974 |
| Santa Paula | Ventura | 3,657 | 58.90% | 2,069 | 33.32% | 483 | 7.78% | 1,588 | 25.58% | 6,209 |
| Simi Valley | Ventura | 10,312 | 34.98% | 16,673 | 56.56% | 2,492 | 8.45% | -6,361 | -21.58% | 29,477 |
| Thousand Oaks | Ventura | 13,916 | 38.37% | 19,610 | 54.07% | 2,742 | 7.56% | -5,694 | -15.70% | 36,268 |
| Unincorporated Area | Ventura | 10,057 | 39.74% | 12,625 | 49.89% | 2,625 | 10.37% | -2,568 | -10.15% | 25,307 |
| Davis | Yolo | 10,743 | 55.89% | 4,993 | 25.97% | 3,487 | 18.14% | 5,750 | 29.91% | 19,223 |
| West Sacramento | Yolo | 4,237 | 49.91% | 3,122 | 36.77% | 1,131 | 13.32% | 1,115 | 13.13% | 8,490 |
| Winters | Yolo | 631 | 44.66% | 593 | 41.97% | 189 | 13.38% | 38 | 2.69% | 1,413 |
| Woodland | Yolo | 4,565 | 38.81% | 5,819 | 49.47% | 1,378 | 11.72% | -1,254 | -10.66% | 11,762 |
| Unincorporated Area | Yolo | 1,807 | 33.07% | 2,957 | 54.12% | 700 | 12.81% | -1,150 | -21.05% | 5,464 |
| Marysville | Yuba | 848 | 34.11% | 1,392 | 55.99% | 246 | 9.90% | -544 | -21.88% | 2,486 |
| Wheatland | Yuba | 136 | 29.31% | 267 | 57.54% | 61 | 13.15% | -131 | -28.23% | 464 |
| Unincorporated Area | Yuba | 2,463 | 28.46% | 5,245 | 60.61% | 945 | 10.92% | -2,782 | -32.15% | 8,653 |
| Totals (Note: Statewide candidate vote percentages and the total vote number differ here because California's Supplement to Statement of Vote does not count write-in votes as part of the city totals.) | | 3,533,441 (Note: Davis had 49 fewer votes recorded in the Supplement to the Statement of Vote compared to the initial statement of vote, due to differences in the counts for both Los Angeles & San Joaquin counties.) | 47.28% | 3,169,797 (Note: Simon had 4 fewer votes recorded in the Supplement to the Statement of Vote compared to the initial statement of vote, due to differences in the counts for both Los Angeles & San Joaquin counties.) | 42.41% | 770,691 | 10.31% | 363,644 | 4.87% | 7,473,929 |
