= Bill Simon (politician) =

American businessman and politician

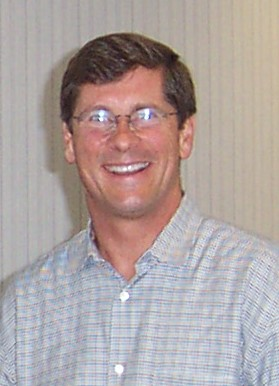
- Simon in 2002
- Born: William Edward Simon Jr. June 20, 1951 (age 74); Neptune Township, New Jersey, U.S.
- Education: Williams College (BA); Boston College (JD)
- Occupations: Banker; businessman; attorney
- Political party: Republican
- Spouse: Cindy (second marriage)
- Children: 4
- Father: William E. Simon

William Edward Simon Jr. (born June 20, 1951) is an American banker, businessman, politician, and attorney. In 2002, Simon campaigned unsuccessfully for Governor of California as a Republican against Democratic incumbent Gray Davis. After winning the Republican primary in an upset, the virtually unknown Simon's conservative campaign was significantly boosted by support from better-known Republican officeholders from outside California, including former New York City Mayor Rudy Giuliani (under whom Simon had briefly worked as an Assistant United States Attorney) and President George W. Bush.

== Background ==
Simon was born on June 20, 1951, in Neptune, New Jersey, the son of Carol (Girard) and William E. Simon Sr., the 63rd Secretary of the Treasury under Richard Nixon and Gerald Ford. Simon Sr., also served as director of the Federal Energy Office. Simon grew up in Florham Park, New Jersey. He was a childhood friend of former Democratic party chair Howard Dean.

Simon earned a BA from Williams College in 1973, and a JD from Boston College in 1982. At Boston College Law School, "Billy" Simon was widely popular and respected. He was a Moot Court Champion and represented the school in national moot court competitions. From 1985 to 1988, Simon served as Assistant United States Attorney in the Southern District of New York, working under then-U.S. Attorney Rudy Giuliani. In this role, he worked primarily in the civil division, though he also worked on criminal cases. His 2002 campaign credited him with a key role in the Mafia Commission Trial which coincided with his tenure there, though the claims were later walked back after a Los Angeles Times investigation cast doubt on his level of involvement.

In 1988, Simon co-founded William E. Simon & Sons, a global merchant bank, with his father and brother. Simon managed the family business (which has over $3 billion in assets), as an Assistant U.S. Attorney, and as a trustee for The Heritage Foundation. Simon also chairs the William E. Simon Foundation. He moved to Los Angeles in 1990 to lead the bank's office there. Simon contributed some of his personal resources to assist less fortunate youths through educational scholarships and beautification of California schools, and, like his father, became an active supporter of Covenant House.

== 2002 California gubernatorial election ==
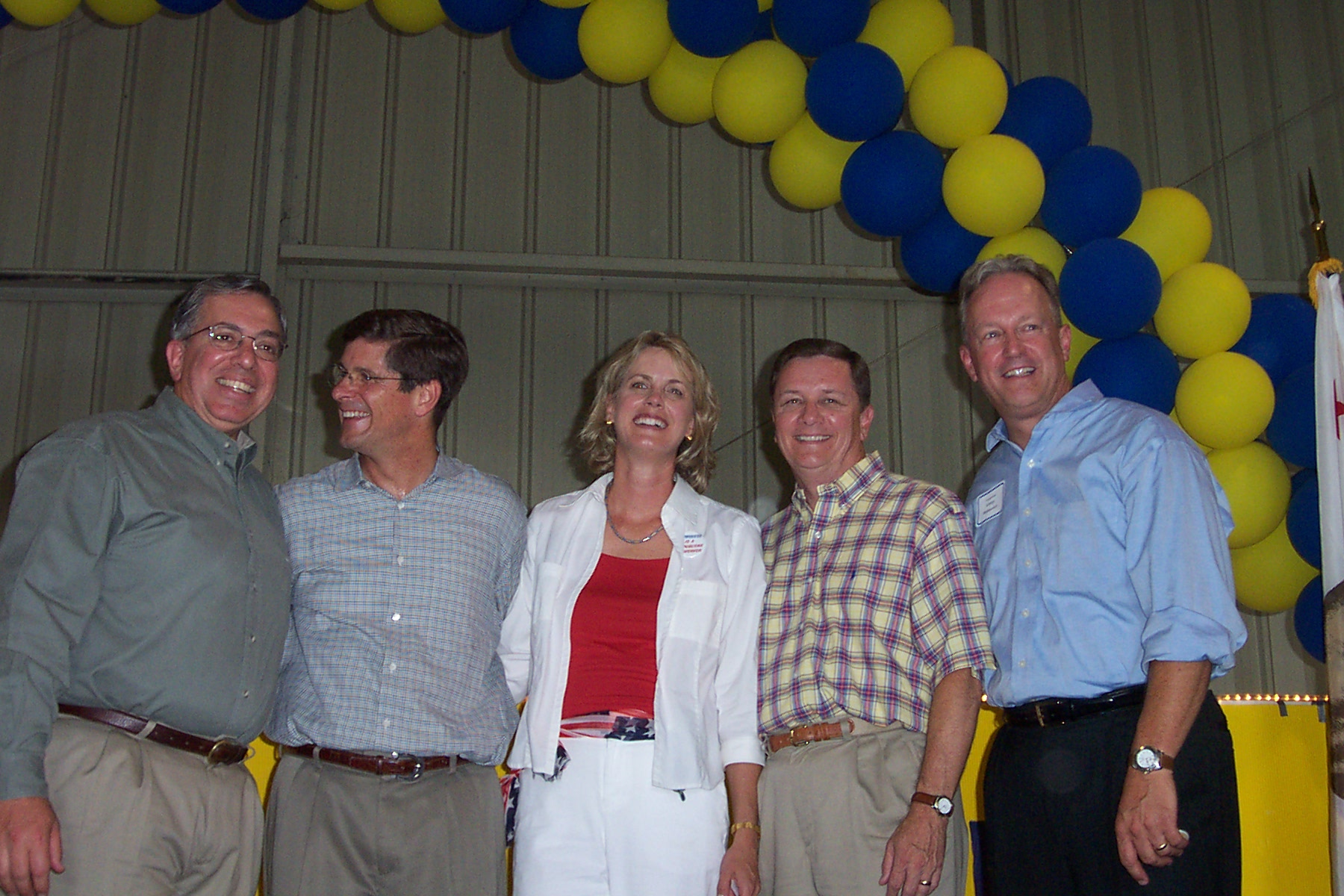
Simon with his wife, George Radanovich, Dave Cogdill, and Chuck Poochigian in September 2002

=== Primary ===
Simon won the Republican nomination in the primary election of March 2002, in what CNN called "a stunning upset". Some credit Simon's primary win to incumbent Governor Gray Davis' preemptive campaign against Simon's major primary opponent, former Los Angeles mayor Richard Riordan, a moderate Republican, whom Davis considered a more formidable opponent. At the beginning of the campaign Riordan had higher name recognition and popularity than any other gubernatorial candidate. In fact Riordan began attacking Davis early on in the primaries, as if he already had the GOP nomination, which is what prompted the counter-attack, according to Garry South, Davis' campaign manager.

Simon's come-from-behind win reflected both the GOP's dissatisfaction with Riordan's inability to appeal to the GOP base (he had publicly insulted George Deukmejian, California's most popular Republican governor since Ronald Reagan, and it was revealed that he had supported Democratic Senator Dianne Feinstein with campaign contributions) and support for Simon's straight-conservative image. Both Riordan and Simon are Roman Catholics and Knights of Malta, with Riordan pro-choice on abortion and Simon pro-life.

Simon polled 1,129,973 primary votes (49.4 percent) to Riordan's 715,768 (31.3 percent). Another 387,237 ballots (16.9 percent) were cast for Bill Jones, then the California secretary of state.

=== General ===
Davis's campaign advertisements made heavy use of scandals relating to alleged mismanagement of Simon's business and charities, though one of the major court rulings unfavorable to Simon was since overturned.

Simon's campaign centered largely on allegations of corruption in the incumbent's administration, and Davis's handling of the 2001 energy crisis.

Immediately after the gubernatorial debate against Gray Davis, Simon accused Davis of receiving campaign funds in the Lieutenant Governor's office, a felony. Simon distributed a photo of Davis being handed a check and insisted that the picture was taken in the Lieutenant Governor's office in the State capitol. Within an hour of its release the location in the picture was determined to have no resemblance to the office, and within a few days the location was identified as Bruce Karatz's home in Southern California.

Despite Davis's high disapproval ratings, he managed to defeat Simon by a margin of 47.3% of the vote to Simon's 42.4%.

== After gubernatorial campaign ==
When the 2003 California gubernatorial recall election became a reality, Simon announced he would once again be a candidate for California Governor but ran for only a short time after he qualified for the ballot before withdrawing from the race on August 23, 2003.

He said, "There are too many Republicans in this race and the people of our state simply cannot risk a continuation of the Gray Davis legacy." Simon did not endorse any candidates until several weeks later, when he endorsed front-runner Arnold Schwarzenegger. Despite dropping out, his name still appeared in the ballot, and he placed 12th in a field of 135 candidates.

Simon spent most of 2004 and 2005 preparing to run for California state treasurer in 2006, and although he was the clear front-runner for the Republican nomination, he dropped out in October 2005 citing the need to devote more time and attention to his family.

In 2010, Simon became an adjunct professor at the University of California, Los Angeles, in its economics department.

=== Giuliani campaign ===
On February 26, 2007, he was appointed as the Director of Policy for the Rudy Giuliani presidential exploratory committee. Simon was the most influential member of the Giuliani campaign, and was referred to many times as Giuliani's "Professor." The campaign was unsuccessful and Giuliani was one of the first candidates to exit the race.

== Personal life ==
Simon has a daughter from a marriage that ended in divorce. He and his second wife, Cindy, have three children. The couple are longtime residents of the Pacific Palisades neighborhood of Los Angeles, and narrowly avoided losing their home in the 2025 Palisades Fire.

Party political offices
Preceded by Dan Lungren	Republican nominee for Governor of California; 2002	Succeeded by Arnold Schwarzenegger
