= David A. Armstrong =

American cinematographer (born 1962)

- Born: David A. Armstrong; 1962 (age 63–64); Los Angeles, California
- Education: California Institute of the Arts and American Film Institute
- Occupations: Cinematographer, producer, Film director
- Years active: 1986–present
- Website: davidaarmstrong.com

David A. Armstrong is an American cinematographer, film producer and director, who was involved in a number of short films and low budget horror films. Although best known for his work on the first six installments of the Saw franchise, Armstrong has also directed two films, the crime thrillers Pawn and The Assassin's Code.

== Life and career ==
Having a Master of Fine Arts in cinematography from the American Film Institute, and a Bachelor of Fine Arts from California Institute of the Arts, Armstrong began his career as the cinematographer of an unreleased 1986 film, Norman and God. Shortly after, he shot a series of independent B-movies and short films. In 2004, Armstrong was hired by James Wan and Leigh Whannell to film the first installment of the Saw franchise. He also served as cinematographer for the next five films, namely Saw II, Saw III, Saw IV, Saw V, and Saw VI. Armstrong went on to shoot other low budget independent horror films including Sam's Lake, Skinwalkers, and The Gravedancers (all 2006). In 2009, Armstrong served as director of photography for the crime thrillers The Lodger and 2:13, as well the action-comedy Next Day Air. Armstrong's latest efforts as cinematographer are Dead Awake (2010), Hellraiser: Revelations, and On the Inside (both 2011).

Armstrong made his directorial debut with the action film Pawn (2013), starring Michael Chiklis, Ray Liotta, Common, Stephen Lang and Forest Whitaker. The independent film was shot in only 15 days and was released straight-to-DVD.

Armstrong directed his second feature, the crime thriller The Assassin's Code (2018), starring Justin Chatwin, Peter Stormare, and Mark Thompson. Having its world premiere at the 42nd Cleveland International Film Festival, the film was released through video on demand platforms by Gravitas Ventures.

== Filmography ==
=== As cinematographer ===
Year	Title	Director	Notes
1986	Norman and God	Unknown	Unreleased
1987	Significant Other	Unknown	Unreleased
1995	Friday Night Blues	Unknown	Unreleased
1997	Two in the Morning	Michelle Remsen	Short film
1997	My Dinner with Andre the Giant	Tim Ryan	Short film
1997	Burningman: Inside the Kaleidoscope	Unknown	Unreleased
1998	The Way to Santiago	Jack Swanstrom	Short film
1998	John	Marni Banack	Short film
2000	New Suits	Regina Don	Short film
2002	P.S. Your Cat Is Dead!	Steve Guttenberg	
2002	Ritual	Avi Nesher	Crypt Keeper sequences
2002	Footprints	E. Marshall	Unreleased
2002	Judge is God	James Allen	Short film
2002	sIDney	Malik Vitthal	Short film
2002	Lyric Cafe	Unknown	Unknown episodes
2003	Fear of Feathers	Chad McCord	Short film
2003	Seventh Veil	Amin Q. Chaudhri	
2004	Saw	James Wan	
2004	Ride with Funkmaster Flex	Unknown	2 episodes
2005	Cotillion '65	Judy Chaikin	Short film
2005	Saw II	Darren Lynn Bousman	
2006	Jam	Mark Woollen	Documentary
2006	Saw III	Darren Lynn Bousman	
2006	Sam's Lake	Andrew C. Erin	
2006	Skinwalkers	James Isaac	
2006	The Gravedancers	Mike Mendez	
2007	Sibling Rivalry	Joanne Rubino; Liza Seneca	Short film
2007	Saw IV	Darren Lynn Bousman	
2008	Saw V	David Hackl	
2008- 2009	Heroes: The Recruit	Rob Hardy	5 episodes
2009	Kill Theory	Chris Moore	
2009	The Lodger	David Ondaatje	
2009	2:13	Charles Adelman	
2009	Next Day Air	Benny Boom	
2009	Saw VI	Kevin Greutert	
2009	Two Spirits	Lydia Nibley	Documentary
2010	Dead Awake	Omar Naim	
2011	Hellraiser: Revelations	Víctor Garcia	
2011	On the Inside	D.W. Brown	
2011	Independent Lens	Lydia Nibley	1 episode
2014	It's Worth More Than You Think	Mohammed Mamdouh	Short film

=== As producer ===
Year	Title	Notes
2017	New Suits	Short film; associate producer
2002	sIDney	Short film; associate producer
2009	2:13	
2017	Midnight Clear	Short film; executive producer
2018	The Assassin's Code	

=== As director ===
Year	Title	Notes
2013	Pawn	Directorial debut
2018	The Assassin's Code	
