= Mark Morgan (producer) =

American film producer

- Education: University of California, Los Angeles
- Occupation: Film producer
- Years active: 1995–present
- Notable work: The Twilight Saga; Percy Jackson & the Olympians: The Lightning Thief; Agent Cody Banks

Mark Paul Morgan is an American film producer. He has been a producer and executive producer on films including The Twilight Saga film series, Percy Jackson & the Olympians: The Lightning Thief, and the Agent Cody Banks films.

== Career ==
Morgan began his producing career at New Regency and Warner Brothers as a story editor on such films as L.A. Confidential, Heat, A Time to Kill, and Murder at 1600'. He moved on to be Director of Development and later Vice President of Production at Orion/MPCA, where he was involved in the development and production of film projects such as Ringmaster. When Orion/ MPCA split off to form Destination Films, Morgan served as Executive Vice President of the company and produced films including Beautiful, Slackers, and The Wedding Planner.

Morgan moved on to become the CEO of Maverick Films, founded by Guy Oseary and Madonna. He optioned the manuscript Twilight by Stephenie Meyer. It later became The New York Times bestselling novel and The Twilight Saga. He also produced Agent Cody Banks, Agent Cody Banks 2: Destination London, Sam's Lake, The Gravedancers, Frostbite, Cruel World, My Sassy Girl, Material Girls, and Hit and Run. Morgan executive produced the TV series The Riches, starring Eddie Izzard and Minnie Driver for Fox Television Studios and FX.

In 2008, Morgan co-founded Imprint Entertainment and produced Twilight, directed by Katherine Hardwick, for Summit Entertainment. He also produced the Twilight Saga sequels The Twilight Saga: New Moon, The Twilight Saga: Eclipse, and The Twilight Saga: Breaking Dawn – Part 1 and The Twilight Saga: Breaking Dawn – Part 2.

Morgan continued his successful book-to-film adaptations by executive producing Percy Jackson & the Olympians: The Lightning Thief and the sequel Percy Jackson: Sea of Monsters.

Morgan was head of the film and television production company Outlier from 2012–2014; in 2013 he signed on to produce the film Savage, based on an acclaimed graphic novel.

Morgan founded Mount Diablo Entertainment in August 2014.

== Awards ==
In 2009, Morgan won the Vision Award for "A Producer of Vision" and the 2009 MTV Movie Award's Golden Popcorn for Best Movie of the Year for Twilight. He received the MTV Award again the following year for New Moon.

== Filmography ==
- Slightly Single in L.A. (2013)
- Percy Jackson: Sea of Monsters (2013)
- Hansel & Gretel Get Baked (2013)
- The Twilight Saga: Breaking Dawn – Part 2 (2012)
- The Twilight Saga: Breaking Dawn – Part 1 (2011)
- The Twilight Saga: Eclipse (2010)
- Percy Jackson & the Olympians: The Lightning Thief (2010)
- The Twilight Saga: New Moon (2009)
- The Stepfather (2009)
- The Industry (2009)
- Hit and Run (2009)
- Twilight (2008)
- My Sassy Girl (2008)
- The Riches (2007–2008)
- Alyx (2008)
- Material Girls (2006)
- Sam's Lake (2006)
- The Gravedancers (2006)
- Chasing Christmas (2005)
- Cruel World (2005)
- Frostbite (2005)
- 20 Days Until I'm Famous (2004)
- Agent Cody Banks 2: Destination London (2004)
- Agent Cody Banks (2003)
- Slackers (2002)
- The Wedding Planner (2001)
- Beautiful (2000)
- Ringmaster (1998)
