= John Swanstrom =

John Swanstrom may refer to:

- Jack Swanstrom (real name John Swanstrom; 1961/62–2015), American educator and film director
- J. Edward Swanstrom (1853–1911), American lawyer and politician
