= Dede Allen =

American film editor (1923–2010)

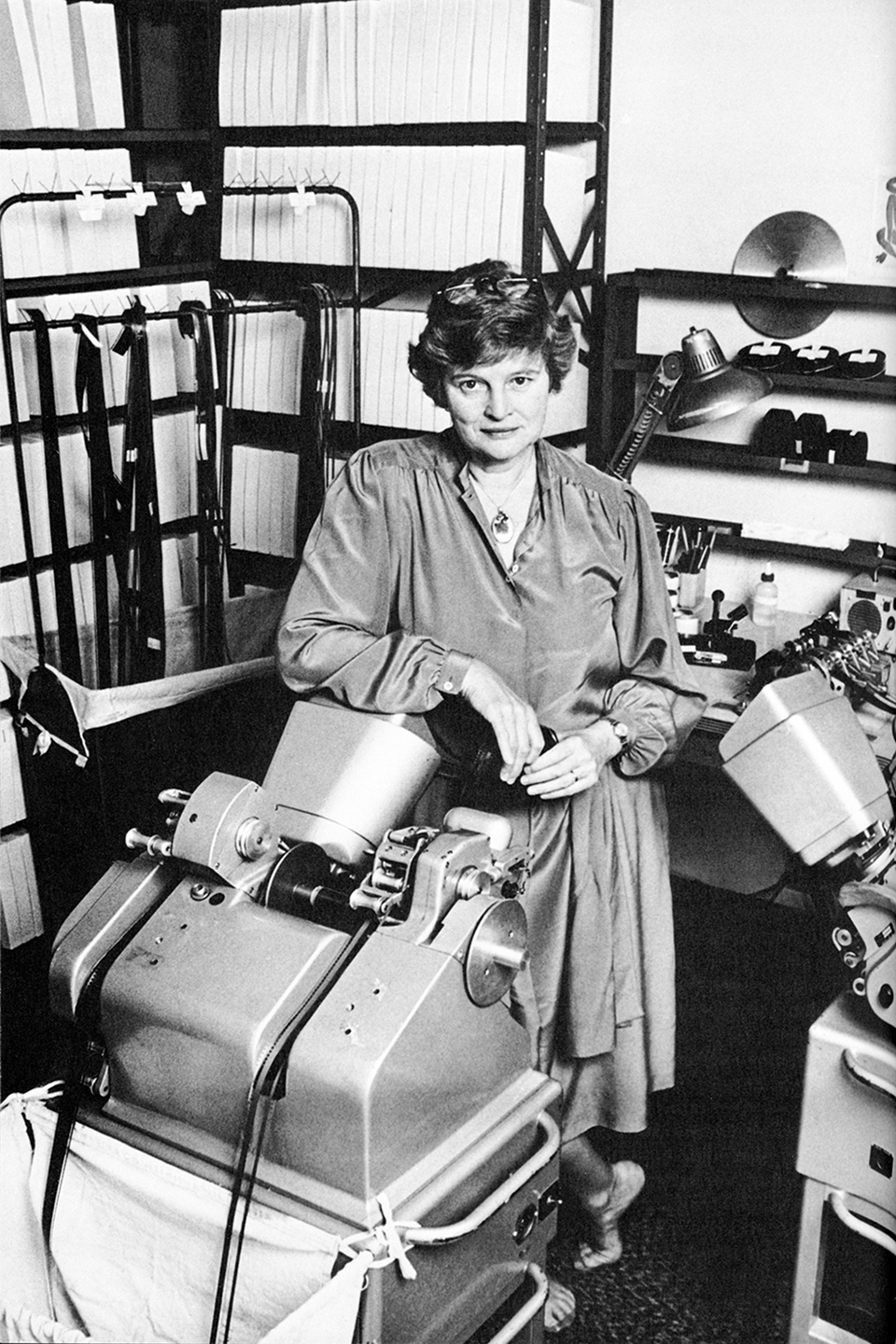
- Dede Allen photographed by Lynn Gilbert
- Born: Dorothea Carothers Allen; December 3, 1923; Cleveland, Ohio, U.S.
- Died: April 17, 2010 (aged 86); Los Angeles, California, U.S.
- Occupation: Film editor
- Years active: 1948–2008
- Spouse: Stephen Fleischman (m. 1945)
- Children: 2, including Tom Fleischman

Dorothea Carothers "Dede" Allen (December 3, 1923 – April 17, 2010) was an American film editor.

Allen edited films such as The Hustler (1961), Bonnie and Clyde (1967), Dog Day Afternoon (1975), and Reds (1981). She collaborated with director Arthur Penn, (1967–1976), and worked with directors Sidney Lumet, Robert Wise, Elia Kazan, and George Roy Hill. She was a member of the Board of Governors of the Academy of Motion Picture Arts and Sciences.

== Early life ==
Allen was born in Cleveland, Ohio. Her mother, Dorthea S. Corothers, was an actress, and her father, Thomas Humphrey Cushing Allen III, worked for Union Carbide.

At age three, Allen and her sister Manette were placed in boarding school by their mother, who had left her marriage and moved to Europe. The next year, Allen’s father died in an automobile accident while her mother remained in Europe, leaving Allen and her sister in boarding school for another six years. After leaving boarding school, Allen stayed intermittently with her mother, and they bonded through their love of film by attending the local movie theater frequently. When not with her mother, Allen attended College Preparatory School and befriended a teacher named Ruthie Jones, who encouraged her liberal politics and acted as a maternal figure. Allen studied architecture, weaving, and pottery at Scripps College in Claremont, California, where she remained passionate about film. She left Scripps to start a job as a messenger at Columbia Pictures.

== Career ==
In 1943, in the summer after her sophomore year of college, Allen’s grandfather secured her a job with Elliot Nugent Sr. at Columbia Pictures, which had just started hiring women because of the shortage of available male employees during World War II. She worked in the position for ten months, and then was hired into the sound effects department at Columbia. While working at Columbia, Allen took classes at The Actor’s Lab in California in acting, directing, and stage managing, which helped her master the importance of proper timing in a scene.

In 1948, Allen married Stephen Fleischman, who was working as a screenwriter in Hollywood. With Fleischman she moved to Europe and worked as a translator for two years. They moved to New York together in 1950 and Allen worked as a script clerk, even organizing a union, and was hired as an editor for commercials and industrial films at a company called Film Graphics. She began working with Carl Lerner, a screenwriter and editor who she had worked with her first summer at Columbia. Lerner recommended her to Robert Wise, where Allen edited her first important feature film, Odds Against Tomorrow (1959).

She worked closely with and was mentored by film director Robert Wise, who had also been a film editor himself (most notably having edited Orson Welles' Citizen Kane). Wise encouraged Dede Allen to be brave and experiment with her editing -- "he was the first person who said, 'No matter how many directions I give you, if it doesn't play, don't show it to me.' He was excited as hell if I came up with something. He had a great influence on me because he was a tremendous editor in his own time so he knew."

Much like the raw editing of dadaist filmmaking (an approach followed by René Clair early in his career) or perhaps akin to that of the French New Wave, Allen pioneered the use of audio overlaps and utilized emotional jump cuts, stylistic flourishes that brought energy and realism to characters that until that point had not been a part of classic Hollywood film editing technique. Continuity editing and screen direction (being tied to the constraints of place and time) became the low priority, while using cutting to express the micro-cultural body language of the characters and moving the plot along in an artistic, almost three-dimensional manner became her modus operandi.

In 1992, Allen accepted the position of Vice-President in Charge of Creative Development at the Warner Bros. Studio. In 2000 she returned to editing with the film Wonder Boys, for which she was nominated for her third Academy Award.

On a 2012 listing of the 75 best edited films of all time, compiled by the Motion Picture Editors Guild based on a survey of its members, three films edited by Allen appear: Bonnie and Clyde, Dog Day Afternoon, and Reds. Only George Tomasini had more films on this listing.

Variety's Eileen Kowalski notes that, "Indeed, many of the editorial greats have been women: Dede Allen, Verna Fields, Thelma Schoonmaker, Anne V. Coates and Dorothy Spencer."

== Personal life ==
Allen married director and screenwriter Stephen Fleischman in 1948. She and Fleischman had two children, Tom (1951) and daughter, Ramey (1953). Allen was a women’s rights activist and an advocate for unions.

Allen died on April 17, 2010, in Los Angeles, California from a stroke. Her husband died on June 5, 2011.

== Selected filmography ==
Year	Title	Director	Co-editors
1959	Odds Against Tomorrow	Robert Wise	
1961	The Hustler	Robert Rossen	
1963	America, America	Elia Kazan	
1967	Bonnie and Clyde	Arthur Penn	
1968	Rachel, Rachel	Paul Newman	
1969	Alice's Restaurant	Arthur Penn	
1970	Little Big Man	Arthur Penn	
1972	Slaughterhouse-Five	George Roy Hill	
1973	Serpico	Sidney Lumet	Richard Marks, Ronald Roose, and Angelo Corrao
1975	Dog Day Afternoon	Sidney Lumet	
1975	Night Moves	Arthur Penn	Steven A. Rotter
1976	The Missouri Breaks	Arthur Penn	Gerald B. Greenberg and Steven Rotter
1977	Slap Shot	George Roy Hill	
1978	The Wiz	Sidney Lumet	
1981	Reds	Warren Beatty	Craig McKay
1984	Harry & Son	Paul Newman	
1984	Mike's Murder	James Bridges	
1985	The Breakfast Club	John Hughes	
1986	Off Beat	Michael Dinner	Angelo Corrao
1988	The Milagro Beanfield War	Robert Redford	Jim Miller
1989	Let It Ride	Joe Pytka	Jim Miller
1990	Henry & June	Philip Kaufman	Vivien Hillgrove Gilliam and William S. Scharf (Interview in two parts)
1991	The Addams Family	Barry Sonnenfeld	
2000	Wonder Boys	Curtis Hanson	
2002	John Q.	Nick Cassavetes	
2004	The Final Cut	Omar Naim	Robert Brakey
2007	Have Dreams, Will Travel	Brad Isaacs	Robert Brakey
2008	Fireflies in the Garden	Dennis Lee	Robert Brakey

== Academy Awards and nominations ==
- 1976 – Dog Day Afternoon, nominated for Academy Award, Best Editing
- 1982 – Reds, nominated for Academy Award, Best Editing (w/ co-editor Craig McKay)
- 2001 – Wonder Boys, nominated for Academy Award, Best Editing

== Other awards and nominations ==
- 1962 – The Hustler, nominated for American Cinema Editors (ACE) Eddie, Best Edited Feature Film
- 1968 – Bonnie and Clyde, nominated for American Cinema Editors (ACE) Eddie, Best Edited Feature Film
- 1975 – Dog Day Afternoon won BAFTA Film Award, Best Editing
- 1982 – Reds, nominated for American Cinema Editors (ACE) Eddie, Best Edited Feature Film (w/ co-editor Craig McKay)
- 1982 – recipient, Women in Film Crystal Award for outstanding women who, through their endurance and the excellence of their work, have helped to expand the role of women within the entertainment industry
- 1994 – honored with American Cinema Editors (ACE), Career Achievement Award
- 1999 – honored at Hollywood Film Festival, Outstanding Achievement in Music Editing
- 2000 – honored by Las Vegas Film Critics Association, Career Achievement Award
- 2005 – Scripps College Distinguished Alumna of the Year
