= Twilight (2008 film) =

2008 film by Catherine Hardwicke

- Theatrical release poster
- Directed by: Catherine Hardwicke
- Screenplay by: Melissa Rosenberg
- Based on: Twilight by Stephenie Meyer
- Produced by: Greg Mooradian; Mark Morgan; Wyck Godfrey
- Starring: Kristen Stewart; Robert Pattinson; Billy Burke; Peter Facinelli
- Cinematography: Elliot Davis
- Edited by: Nancy Richardson
- Music by: Carter Burwell
- Production companies: Temple Hill Entertainment; Maverick Films/Imprint Entertainment
- Distributed by: Summit Entertainment
- Release dates: November 17, 2008 (Mann Village Theater); November 21, 2008 (United States)
- Running time: 121 minutes
- Country: United States
- Language: English
- Budget: $37 million
- Box office: $412 million

Twilight is a 2008 American romantic fantasy film directed by Catherine Hardwicke from a screenplay by Melissa Rosenberg, based on the 2005 novel of the same name by Stephenie Meyer. It is the first installment of The Twilight Saga film series. The film stars Kristen Stewart as Bella Swan, a teenage girl, and Robert Pattinson as Edward Cullen, a vampire. It focuses on the development of Bella and Edward's relationship and the subsequent efforts of Edward and his family to keep Bella safe from another coven of vampires.

The project was in development for approximately three years at Paramount Pictures' MTV Films, during which time a film adaptation that differed significantly from the novel was written. Summit Entertainment acquired the rights to the novel after the project's stagnant development. Rosenberg wrote a new adaptation of the novel shortly before the 2007–2008 Writers Guild of America strike and sought to be faithful to the novel's storyline. Principal photography began in March 2008 and took 44 days, being completed in May; the film was shot in the state of Oregon.

Twilight premiered at the Mann Village Theater in Westwood, California, on November 17, 2008, and was released theatrically in the United States on November 21, by Summit Entertainment. Despite receiving mixed reviews from critics, the film grossed $412 million worldwide. It was released on DVD and Blu-ray on March 21, 2009, and became the most purchased DVD of the year. The soundtrack was released on November 4, 2008.

The film was followed by four sequels: New Moon (2009), Eclipse (2010), Breaking Dawn – Part 1 (2011), and Breaking Dawn – Part 2 (2012)

== Plot ==
Seventeen-year-old Bella Swan leaves Phoenix, Arizona, and moves to Forks, a small town located on Washington state's Olympic Peninsula, to live with her father, Charlie, the town's police chief. Her mother, Renée, is remarried to Phil, a minor league baseball player.

Bella becomes reacquainted with Jacob Black, a Native American teenager who lives with his father, Billy, on the Quileute Indian Reservation near Forks. At school, she finds the mysterious and aloof Cullen siblings particularly intriguing. She is seated next to Edward Cullen in biology class, but he seems repulsed by her.

When Bella is nearly struck by a van in the school parking lot, Edward instantaneously covers a distance of over thirty feet to put himself between her and the van, stopping it with only his hand. He refuses to explain his actions to her, warning her against befriending him. Jacob tells Bella about a long-standing animosity between the Cullens and the Quileutes; the Cullens are not allowed on the reservation.

When Edward saves Bella again, this time from a gang, she does research and concludes he is a vampire. He eventually confirms this and explains that, upon meeting her in biology class, he found her scent irresistible. He says the Cullens only consume animal blood.

The pair fall in love and Edward introduces Bella to his vampire family. Carlisle Cullen, the patriarch, is a doctor at the Forks Hospital. Esme is his wife, and Alice, Jasper, Emmett and Rosalie are their informally adopted children. The family's reaction to Bella is mixed, as some of the Cullens are concerned that the family's secret could be exposed.

Edward and Bella's relationship is jeopardized when three nomadic vampires—James, Victoria, and Laurent—arrive, responsible for a series of deaths being investigated as animal attacks. James, a tracker vampire, is excited by Bella's scent and becomes obsessed with hunting her for sport. The Cullens protect Bella from the trio. Laurent chooses to warn the Cullens about James, who in turn attempt to draw James away from Bella, but James manages to track her to Phoenix. She is there hiding with Jasper and Alice, and James tricks her into thinking he kidnapped her mother by luring her into her old ballet studio.

James reveals the kidnapping was a ruse as he attacks Bella, infecting her with vampire venom. The Cullens arrive and kill James, decapitating and burning him, as Edward removes the venom from Bella's wrist, preventing her from becoming a vampire.

In the aftermath, Edward accompanies an injured Bella to prom, where he refuses her request to transform her into a vampire. They are unaware that James' mate, Victoria, is watching them, plotting revenge for her lover's death.

== Cast ==
- Kristen Stewart as Bella Swan, a 17-year-old girl who moves to the small town of Forks, Washington, from Phoenix, Arizona, and falls in love with Edward Cullen, a vampire. Her life is endangered after James, a sadistic vampire, decides to hunt her.
- Robert Pattinson as Edward Cullen, a 108-year-old vampire who was changed in 1918 and still appears to be seventeen. He is Bella's love interest and eventually falls in love with her. He can read minds, except for Bella's, along with superhuman speed.
- Billy Burke as Charlie Swan, Bella's father and Forks' Chief of Police
- Peter Facinelli as Carlisle Cullen, a compassionate 300-plus-year-old vampire who looks to be in his early 30s. He serves as the town's physician and is the Cullen family patriarch.
- Elizabeth Reaser as Esme Cullen, Carlisle's vampire wife and the matriarch of the Cullen family
- Cam Gigandet as James Witherdale, the vicious member of a trio of nomadic vampires with an intention to kill Bella. He is Victoria's mate and a gifted tracker, due to his unparalleled senses
- Ashley Greene as Alice Cullen, Jasper Hale's mate, a vampire who can see the future based on decisions that people make
- Anna Kendrick as Jessica Stanley, Bella's first friend in Forks
- Nikki Reed as Rosalie Hale, Emmett Cullen's mate, a vampire described as the most beautiful person in the world. She is hostile toward Bella throughout the film, worried that Edward's relationship with a human puts their clan at risk.
- Taylor Lautner as Jacob Black, an old childhood friend of Bella and a member of the Quileute tribe
- Kellan Lutz as Emmett Cullen, physically the strongest vampire of the family
- Jackson Rathbone as Jasper Hale, a Cullen family member who can manipulate emotions. He is the newest member of the Cullen family and thus has the most difficulty maintaining their "vegetarian" diet of feeding only on animal rather than human blood.
- Michael Welch as Mike Newton, one of Bella's new friends who vie for her attention
- Gil Birmingham as Billy Black
- Justin Chon as Eric Yorkie, another one of Bella's classmates who vies for her attention
- Christian Serratos as Angela Weber, one of Bella's new friends in Forks
- José Zúñiga as Mr. Molina
- Rachelle Lefevre as Victoria Sutherland, James' mate who assists him and Laurent in causing havoc in the Olympic Peninsula
- Edi Gathegi as Laurent Da Revin, leader of a trio of vampires wreaking havoc in the Olympic Peninsula and the most civilized of the trio
- Sarah Clarke as Renée Dwyer, Bella's mother who lives in Arizona with her new husband, Phil
- Matt Bushell as Phil Dwyer
- Gregory Tyree Boyce as Tyler Crowley, another one of Bella's classmates, also vying for Bella's attention. He nearly hits Bella with his van.
- Trish Egan as Ms. Cope
- Ayanna Berkshire as Cora
- Ned Bellamy as Waylon Forge
- Solomon Trimble as Sam Uley. Solomon Trimble was credited as "Jacob's friend" in the film, but was widely recognized as playing the part of Sam.
- Katie Powers as waitress
- Krys Hyatt as Embry Call. He was recognized as playing the part of Embry in the Twilight film, though his role was uncredited.

== Production ==
=== Development ===
In early 2004, Greg Mooradian of Maverick Films, looking for young adult novels to adapt to film, received an unpublished manuscript of Twilight and began to read it. After reaching the scene where Bella Swan is saved by Edward Cullen from being hit by a car, Mooradian understood the appeal of the novel. He soon brought the manuscript to David Gale, then executive vice president of Paramount Pictures' MTV Films division, to propose a film adaptation, believing the novel to be "tailor-made" for the MTV brand's teen audience. Gale, in turn, brought it to Paramount's then co-president of production, Karen Rosenfelt, who lobbied to option the rights to the novel. MTV Films eventually acquired the rights in April of the same year and later hired Mark Lord to write a script. The screenplay that was subsequently developed was substantially different from its source material, being more action-oriented. According to Lord, he originally pitched his adaptation as a vampiric take on the play Romeo and Juliet, but MTV Films "wanted to just put in some more action to advance it more and give something more for the male audience. They thought they were going to lose the male audience with too much of a romance." MTV Films was pleased with the script he delivered, which included, among many changes, the character of Bella Swan being a long-distance runner, cursing, using shotguns against vampires who killed her father, being turned into a vampire, and riding a jet ski while being chased by the FBI. When talking about MTV Films' original script, author Stephenie Meyer said, "They could have filmed it and not called it Twilight because it had nothing to do with the book, and that's kind of frightening."

Following a change of management at Paramount Pictures, the studio's new president of production, Brad Weston, told Gale that he believed audiences were not interested in films about vampires and werewolves, after being involved with box-office bomb Cursed at Dimension Films, and development stalled. In January 2006, Paramount put Twilight into turnaround. Rosenfelt, who had left Paramount and came aboard Twilight as a producer, was determined to make the film and attempted to forge a co-production deal between Paramount and Fox 2000 Pictures, where she had a producing deal, but Fox 2000 did not agree with Paramount's terms. Rosenfelt later tried to generate interest at Fox Atomic, but Fox Atomic passed. In October 2006, Rosenfelt met with Erik Feig, then president of production of Summit Entertainment, and mentioned to him that, of all the projects she wished she could make, she thought Twilight had the biggest potential. After their meeting, Feig obtained a copy of the novel, read it, and passed it on to colleagues at Summit, who perceived it as an opportunity to launch a franchise. When Paramount Pictures let the rights to Twilight expire in April 2007, Summit acquired them, agreeing in contract with Meyer that their film adaptation would be more faithful to the novel than MTV Films' version.

Before even having the rights to Twilight, on the 2007 Sundance Film Festival, Feig talked with director Catherine Hardwicke, of whom he was a fan, about working with Summit Entertainment and sent her five scripts of films the studio was developing, including Mark Lord's draft of Twilight for MTV Films. Hardwicke did not like any of the scripts, but ended up curious about Twilight. She bought a copy of the novel and realized the script she had read had very little to do with the source material, which she soon began envisioning as a film. Following Summit's acquisition of the rights, Hardwicke was set to direct the film and Melissa Rosenberg was hired to write the script in mid-2007.

Rosenberg developed an outline by the end of August and collaborated with Hardwicke on writing the screenplay during the following month. Rosenberg said Hardwicke "was a great sounding board and had all sorts of brilliant ideas. [...] I'd finish off scenes and send them to her, and get back her notes." Due to the impending Writers Guild of America strike, Rosenberg worked full-time to finish the screenplay before October 31. In adapting the novel, she "had to condense a great deal." Some characters from the novel were not featured in the screenplay, whereas some characters were combined into others. "[O]ur intent all along was to stay true to the book", Rosenberg explained, "and it has to do less with adapting it word for word and more with making sure the characters' arcs and emotional journeys are the same." Hardwicke suggested the use of voice over to convey Bella's internal dialogue – since the novel is told from her point of view – and she sketched some of the storyboards during pre-production.

=== Adaptation from source material ===
The filmmakers behind Twilight worked to create a film that was as faithful to the novel as they thought possible when converting the story to another medium. Producer Greg Mooradian said, "It's very important to distinguish that we're making a separate piece of art that obviously is going to remain very, very faithful to the book. [...] But at the same time, we have a separate responsibility to make the best movie you can make." To ensure a faithful adaptation, Meyer was kept very involved in the production process, having been invited to visit the set during filming and even asked to give notes on the script and on a rough cut of the film. Of this process, she said, "It was a really pleasant exchange [between me and the filmmakers] from the beginning, which I think is not very typical. They were really interested in my ideas", and "[...] they kept me in the loop and with the script, they let me see it and said, 'What are your thoughts?' [...] They let me have input on it and I think they took 90 percent of what I said and just incorporated it right into the script." Meyer fought for one line in particular, one of the most well-known from the book about "the lion and the lamb", to be kept verbatim in the film: "I actually think the way Melissa [Rosenberg] wrote it sounded better for the movie [...] but the problem is that line is actually tattooed on peoples' bodies. [...] But I said, 'You know, if you take that one and change it, that's a potential backlash situation.'" Meyer was even invited to create a written list of things that could not be changed for the film, such as giving the vampires fangs or killing characters who do not die in the book, that the studio agreed to follow in the contract. The consensus among critics is that the filmmakers succeeded in making a film that is very faithful to its source material, with one reviewer stating that, with a few exceptions, "Twilight the movie is unerringly faithful to the source without being hamstrung by it."

However, as is most often the case with film adaptations, differences do exist between the film and source material. Certain scenes from the book were cut from the film, such as a biology room scene where Bella's class does blood typing. Hardwicke explains, "Well [the book is] almost 500 pages—you do have to do the sweetened condensed milk version of that. [...] We already have two scenes in biology: the first time they're in there and then the second time when they connect. For a film, when you condense, you don't want to keep going back to the same setting over and over. So that's not in there." The settings of certain conversations in the book were also changed to make the scenes more "visually dynamic" on-screen, such as Bella's revelation that she knows Edward is a vampire—this happens in a meadow in the film instead of in Edward's car as in the novel. A biology field trip scene is added to the film to condense the moments of Bella's frustration at trying to explain how Edward saved her from being crushed by a van. The villainous vampires are introduced earlier in the film than in the novel. Rosenberg said "You don't really see James and the other villains until the last quarter of the book, which really won't work for a movie. You need that ominous tension right off the bat. We needed to see them and that impending danger from the start. And so I had to create a back story for them, what they were up to, to flesh them out a bit as characters." Rosenberg also combined some of the human high school students, with Lauren Mallory and Jessica Stanley in the novel becoming the character of Jessica in the film, and a "compilation of a couple of different human characters" becoming Eric Yorkie. About these variances from the book, Mooradian stated, "I think we did a really judicious job of distilling [the book]. Our greatest critic, Stephenie Meyer, loves the screenplay, and that tells me that we made all the right choices in terms of what to keep and what to lose. Invariably, you're going to lose bits and pieces that certain members of the audience are going to desperately want to see, but there's just a reality that we're not making 'Twilight: The Book' the movie."

=== Casting ===
When they told me Rob was probably the one, I looked him up and thought, "Yeah, he can do a version of Edward. He's definitely got that vampire thing going on." And then, when I was on set and I got to watch him go from being Rob to shifting into being Edward, and he actually looked like the Edward in my head, it was a really bizarre experience. [...] He really had it nailed.

— Twilight author Stephenie Meyer

Several actresses, including Lily Collins and Jennifer Lawrence, screen tested for the role of Bella Swan, while Frances Bean Cobain turned down the opportunity to audition for the role. Michelle Trachtenberg also turned down the part due to scheduling issues. Hardwicke desired to test Kristen Stewart, who she had seen in Into the Wild and became her first choice for the part. Stewart eventually agreed to meet Hardwicke while working on Adventureland and Hardwicke visited her in Philadelphia with actor Jackson Rathbone, who was in contention to portray Edward Cullen, for an informal screen test that "captivated" the director. After casting Stewart as Bella, Hardwicke had trouble finding an actor otherworldly enough to play Edward Cullen. Several actors, including Scott Eastwood and Josh Peck, auditioned for the role. Rathbone, Shiloh Fernandez, Ben Barnes, and Robert Pattinson were the final four up for the role. Hardwicke did not initially choose Pattinson for Edward Cullen, with him arriving at her house in Venice, Los Angeles for a test, according to Hardwicke, "kind of wild-looking" with "scraggly, black dyed hair, and a stain on his shirt", while also having, according to Pattinson, a "hairless, chubby body" from "drinking beer all day" for a few months. After an audition, however, where Pattinson kissed Stewart on Hardwicke's bed and fell out of it, he was selected. Hardwicke said, "Kristen was like, 'It's got to be Rob!' She felt connected to him from the first moment. That electricity, or love at first sight, or whatever it is." Hardwicke gave him the part, as long as he got in shape and made a promise. "'You've got to realize that Kristen is 17 years old'", Hardwicke told him. "'She's underage. You've got to focus, dude, or you're going to be arrested.' I made him swear on a stack of Bibles." Pattinson was unfamiliar with the book series prior to his test but read the books later on. Meyer even allowed him to view a manuscript of the unfinished Midnight Sun, which chronicles the events in Twilight from Edward's point of view. Fan reaction to Pattinson's casting as Edward was initially negative; Rachelle Lefevre remarked that "[e]very woman had their own Edward [that] they had to let go of before they could open up to [him], which they did." Meyer was "excited" and "ecstatic" in response to the casting of the two main characters. She had expressed interest in having Emily Browning and Henry Cavill cast as Bella and Edward, respectively, prior to pre-production. Browning was offered to audition for Bella, but she declined as she did not want to committed to a franchise.

Peter Facinelli was chosen to play Carlisle Cullen, though he was not the first choice by Summit, revealing, "Hardwicke liked me, but there was another actor that the studio was pushing for." For unknown reasons, that actor was not able to play the part and Facinelli was selected in his place. Elizabeth Reaser was hired as Esme Cullen, despite only knowing in the audition that the film was based on a novel. Jackson Rathbone, who was in the final mix for Edward, was cast as Jasper Hale. The choice of Ashley Greene to portray Alice Cullen was the subject of fan criticism due to Greene being 7 inches (18 cm) taller than her character as described in the novel. Meyer stated previously that Rachael Leigh Cook resembled her vision of Alice. Nikki Reed was cast as Rosalie Hale. Reed had previously worked with Hardwicke on Thirteen, which they wrote together, and Lords of Dogtown. Reed commented, "I don't want to say it's a coincidence, because we do work well together, and we have a great history. I think we make good work, but it's more that the people that hire [Hardwicke] to direct a film of theirs [have] most likely seen her other work." After an open casting call, Taylor Lautner was cast as Jacob Black. Kellan Lutz was in Africa shooting the miniseries Generation Kill when the auditions for the character of Emmett Cullen were conducted. The role had already been cast by the time that pre-production ended in December 2007, but the actor who had been selected "fell through"; Lutz subsequently auditioned and was flown to Oregon, where Hardwicke personally chose him. Rachelle Lefevre was interested in pursuing a role in the film because Hardwicke was attached to the project as director; there was also "the potential to explore a character, hopefully, over three films"; and she wanted to portray a vampire. She "thought that vampires were basically the best metaphor for human anxiety and questions about being alive." Christian Serratos initially auditioned for Jessica Stanley, but she "fell totally in love with Angela" after reading the novels and successfully took advantage of a later opportunity to audition for Angela Weber. The role of Jessica Stanley went to Anna Kendrick, who got the part after two mix-and-match auditions with various actors.

=== Filming and post-production ===
Principal photography started on March 7, 2008, and ended on April 21, the film was completed by May 2, 2008. Similar to her directorial debut Thirteen, Hardwicke opted for an extensive use of hand-held cinematography to make the film "feel real". Meyer visited the production set three times and was consulted on different aspects of the story; she also has a brief cameo in the film. Cast members who portrayed vampires avoided sunlight to make their skin pale, though makeup was also applied for that effect, and wore contact lenses: "We did the golden color because the Cullens have those golden eyes. And then, when we're hungry, we have to pop the black ones in," Facinelli explained. They also participated in rehearsals with a dance choreographer and observed the physicality of different panthera to make their bodily movements more elegant.

Scenes were filmed primarily in Portland, Oregon, including at the Cullen House, a striking glass-and-wood residence. Stunt work was done mainly by the cast. The fight sequence between Gigandet and Pattinson's characters in a ballet studio, which was filmed during the first week of production, involved a substantial amount of wire work because the vampires in the story have superhuman strength and speed. Gigandet incorporated mixed martial arts fighting moves in this sequence, which involved chicken and honey as substitutes for flesh. Bella, the protagonist, is unconscious during these events, and since the novel is told from her point of view, such action sequences are illustrative and unique to the film. Pattinson noted that maintaining one's center of gravity is difficult when doing wire work "because you have to really fight against it as well as letting it do what it needs to do." Lefèvre found the experience disorienting since the forward motion was out of her control.

Instead of shooting at Forks High School itself, scenes taking place at the school were filmed at Kalama High School and Leodis V. McDaniel High School. Other scenes were filmed in St. Helens, and Hardwicke conducted some reshooting in Pasadena, California, in August. Twilight was originally scheduled to be theatrically released in the United States on December 12, 2008, but its release date was changed to November 21 after Harry Potter and the Half-Blood Prince was rescheduled for an opening in July 2009. Two teaser trailers, as well as some additional scenes, were released for the film, as well as a final trailer, which was released on October 9. A 15-minute excerpt of Twilight was presented during the International Rome Film Festival in Italy. The film received a rating of PG-13 from the Motion Picture Association of America for "some violence and a scene of sensuality".

During the film's DVD and Blu-ray promotion, Hardwicke published the Twilight: Director's Notebook on March 17, 2009.

=== Music ===
The score for Twilight was composed by Carter Burwell, with the rest of the soundtrack chosen by music supervisor Alexandra Patsavas. Meyer was consulted on the soundtrack, which includes music by Muse and Linkin Park, bands she listened to while writing the novels. The original soundtrack was released on November 4, 2008, by Chop Shop Records in conjunction with Atlantic Records. It debuted at number 1 on the Billboard 200.

== Marketing ==
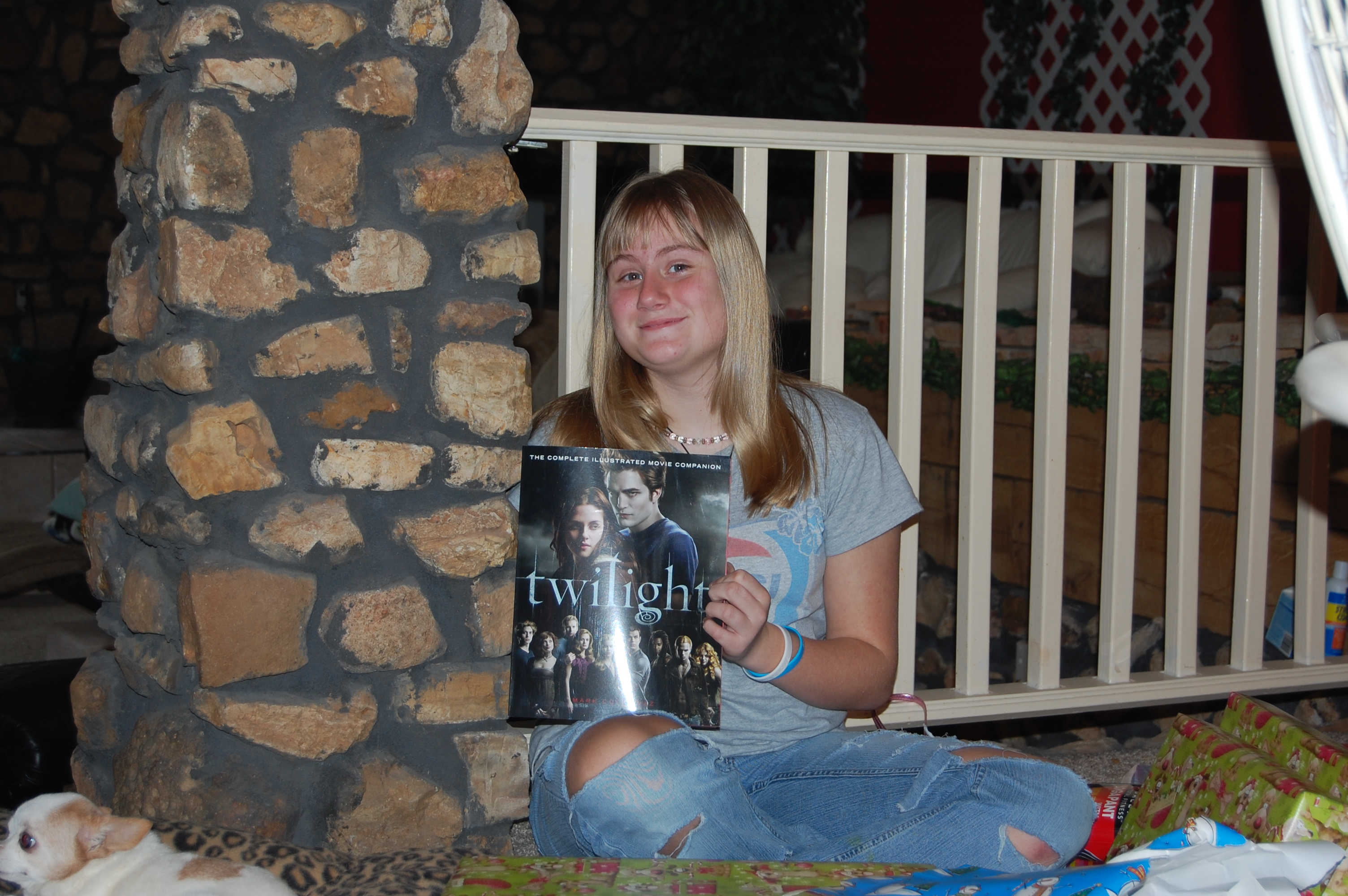
A fan with the Twilight: The Complete Illustrated Movie Companion, 2008

Throughout Twilight's development, Meyer regularly updated her website with new details about Hardwicke's location scouting, casting updates, and Summit Entertainment's agreements with rewrites of the script. By November 2007, Twilight was featured on Summit Entertainment's website under its "pre-production" section, with a placement poster and unannounced cast. In February 2008, it moved to its "in-production" section. On November 16 and December 11, 2007, Kristen Stewart and Robert Pattinson were announced to star as the leading roles.

In April 2008, Hardwicke began to post on the Greetings From Twilight website, where she would promote where future scenes would be shown publicly. This included the MTV Music Video awards pre-show, and San Diego Comic-Con. The website stopped updating in late 2008.

In late April, the official Twilight film website started updating with giveaways, how to host watch parities, secure early tickets, and production image and video galleries. The website hosted separate giveaways which included a poster and a baseball which were both to be signed by the cast. A Myspace community was also created as a hub for fans and was partnered with the site. The website continued to update with links to quizzes and iTunes playlists. In February 2009, the website promoted the release of the film on DVD.

In July, San Diego Comic-Con showcased an teaser trailer for the film, and hosted a panel with Stewart, Pattinson, and Hardwicke.

In August, Twilight began their collaboration with Hot Topic. This included selling shirts, hoodies, posters, along with vinyl and CD's of the soundtrack. After the films release, they released seasonal accessories. Hot Topic also sponsored a national talent tour occurred during November later that year. The talent included Stewart, Pattinson, Taylor Lautner, Edi Gathegi, and Rachelle Lefevre.

Following the film's release, Mark Cotta Vaz wrote the Twilight: The Complete Illustrated Movie Companion that released in October 2008.

== Release ==
=== Box office ===
Twilight grossed over $7 million in ticket sales from midnight showings alone on November 21, 2008. The film is fifth overall on Fandango's list of top advance ticket sales, outranked only by its sequel the following year, Star Wars: Episode III – Revenge of the Sith (2005), The Dark Knight (2008), and Harry Potter and the Half-Blood Prince (2009). It grossed $35.7 million on its opening day. For its opening weekend in the United States and Canada, Twilight accumulated $69.6 million from 3,419 theaters at an average of $20,368 per theater. The film grossed $192,769,854 in the United States and Canada, and $214,417,861 in international territories for a total of $407,187,715. Its opening weekend gross was the highest ever of a female-directed film, surpassing that of Deep Impact (1998).

=== Critical reception ===
Based on 223 reviews collected by Rotten Tomatoes, the film has a rating of 48% and a weighted average score of 5.4/10. The website's critical consensus reads: "Having lost much of its bite transitioning to the big screen, Twilight will please its devoted fans, but do little for the uninitiated." On Metacritic, it has a weighted mean score of 56 based on 38 reviews from film critics, indicating "mixed or average reviews". Audiences surveyed by CinemaScore gave the film an average grade of "A−" on an A+ to F scale.

New York Press critic Armond White called the film "a genuine pop classic", and praised Hardwicke for turning "Meyer's book series into a Brontë-esque vision." Roger Ebert gave the film two-and-a-half stars out of four and wrote, "I saw it at a sneak preview. Last time I saw a movie in that same theater, the audience welcomed it as an opportunity to catch up on gossip, texting, and laughing at private jokes. This time the audience was rapt with attention". In his review for the Los Angeles Times, Kenneth Turan wrote, "Twilight is unabashedly a romance. All the story's inherent silliness aside, it is intent on conveying the magic of meeting that one special person you've been waiting for. Maybe it is possible to be 13 and female for a few hours after all". USA Today gave the film two out of four stars and Claudia Puig wrote, "Meyer is said to have been involved in the production of Twilight, but her novel was substantially more absorbing than the unintentionally funny and quickly forgettable film". Entertainment Weekly gave the film a "B" rating and Owen Gleiberman praised Hardwicke's direction: "She has reconjured Meyer's novel as a cloudburst mood piece filled with stormy skies, rippling hormones, and understated visual effects".

Stewart's performance as Bella received mixed reviews. Claudia Puig of USA Today called her acting "wooden" and her facial expressions throughout the film "blank", while Owen Gleiberman of Entertainment Weekly praised her, calling her "the ideal casting choice" and thought she portrayed "Bella's detachment, as well as her need to bust through it" well. Roger Ebert called Pattinson "well-chosen" for Edward, while Manohla Dargis of The New York Times called him "capable and exotically beautiful". Both he and Taylor Lautner, who plays Jacob, were nominated for Best Male Breakthrough Performance at the 2009 MTV Movie Awards; the award ultimately went to Pattinson.

In 2025, it was one of the films voted for the "Readers' Choice" edition of The New York Times' list of "The 100 Best Movies of the 21st Century," finishing at number 311.

=== Home media ===
The film was released on DVD in North America on March 21, 2009, through midnight release parties, and sold over 3 million units in its first day. It was released on April 6, 2009, in the UK. Bonus features include about 10 to 12 extended or deleted scenes, montages and music videos, behind-the-scenes interviews, a "making-of" segment, and commentary featuring Hardwicke, Stewart, and Pattinson. The film later ended up becoming the most sold DVD of that year.

The Blu-ray disc edition of the film was released on March 21, 2009, in select locations, but was made more widely available at further retailers on May 5, 2009. As of July 2012, the film has sold 11,242,519 units, earning $201,190,019.

The film and the next two installments of the Twilight Saga were re-released as a triple feature with extended cuts on January 13, 2015.

Twilight was released on 4K Blu-ray on October 23, 2018.

=== Video game ===
A film trivia video game developed by Screenlife Games and published by Konami for the Wii, Nintendo DS, PC and iPhone was released alongside the second film.

=== Accolades ===
Since its release, Twilight has received numerous nominations and awards. In January 2009, Carter Burwell was nominated for Film Composer of the Year by the International Film Music Critics Association. Robert Pattinson won Bravo TV's A-List Award for A-List Breakout. At the 2009 MTV Movie Awards, Pattinson, who was nominated alongside Taylor Lautner, also won an award for Male Breakthrough Performance, "Decode" was nominated for Best Song from a Movie, Twilight won an award for Best Movie, Kristen Stewart won for Best Female performance, Stewart and Pattinson were awarded Best Kiss, and Pattinson and Cam Gigandet won an award for Best Fight. Christian Serratos won a Young Artist Award for Best Performance in a Feature Film: Supporting Young Actress. For the 2009 Teen Choice Awards, held on August 9, the film and its actors received a combined total of 12 nominations, nine of which the film won. At the 2009 Scream Awards, the film was nominated for nine awards, four of which it won. The film won two ALMA Awards for makeup and hairstyling. It also won the Public Choice Award at the World Soundtrack Awards, where Carter Burwell was also nominated for Composer of the Year. Catherine Hardwicke received a Young Hollywood Award for her directing. In addition, the film was nominated for Best Fantasy Film at the 35th Saturn Awards and two Grammy Awards.

=== Extended edition ===
In 2015, Lionsgate released an extended edition that was over 4 minutes longer. It edits into the movie scenes already released as "Deleted Scenes" on previous DVD releases.

== Sequel ==
MTV reported in February 2008 that Summit Entertainment intended to create a series of at least three films based on Meyer's books. The studio had optioned New Moon, the second book in the series, by October 2008, and confirmed their plans to make a film based on it November 22, 2008. Because Catherine Hardwicke had wanted more preparation time than Summit's schedule for the production and release of the sequel would provide, Chris Weitz was selected to direct it in December 2008.

== See also ==
- Apotamkin, Bella's Google hit for the cold ones
- Vampire film
