= Imprint Entertainment =

American media production company

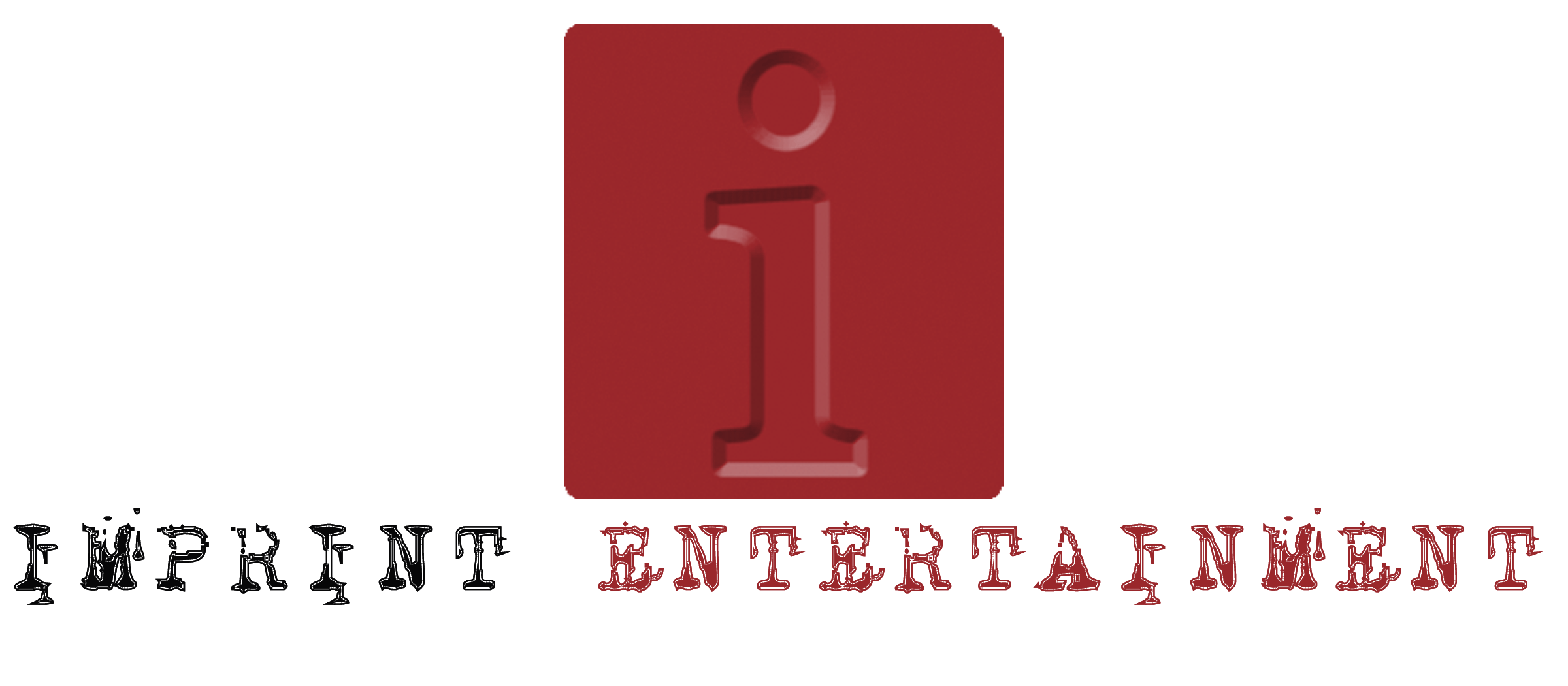
- Company type: Limited liability company
- Industry: Entertainment
- Founded: 2008
- Founder: Michael Becker; Mark Morgan
- Headquarters: West Hollywood, United States
- Key people: Michael Becker
- Products: Motion pictures, television programs
- Website: www.imprint-ent.com

Imprint Entertainment is an American film, TV and media production company founded by former talent agent and talent manager Michael Becker, alongside Mark Morgan, former CEO of Maverick Entertainment, in 2008. In 2011, Becker became sole owner and CEO. The company is located in West Hollywood, California.

== History ==
Imprint Entertainment started in 2008, as a talent management and production company, combining the talent and projects from both Michael Becker and Mark Morgan. In 2011, Becker and Morgan split ways, with Becker retaining all rights to the company and its projects.

== Film productions ==
- Twilight (2008)
- The Stepfather (2009)
- The Industry (2009)
- The Twilight Saga: New Moon (2009)
- The Twilight Saga: Eclipse (2010)
- Soulja Boy: The Movie (2011)
- Slightly Single in L.A. (2012)
- Pawn (2013)
- My Man Is a Loser (2014)
- Kid Cannabis (2014)
- Lap Dance (2014)
- The Vault (2017)

== Talent formerly represented ==
- Soulja Boy, rapper
- Pitbull, music artist
- DJ Quik, rapper
- Joshua Friedlander, writer
