= Dead Awake =

Dead Awake may refer to:

- Dead Awake (2001 film)
- Dead Awake (2010 film)
- Dead Awake (2016 film), an American supernatural psychological horror film

== See also ==
- When We Dead Awaken, an 1899 play by Norwegian dramatist Henrik Ibsen
