= The Assassin's Code =

- Directed by: David A. Armstrong
- Screenplay by: Edward Lee Cornett; Valerie Grant as assistant; Original characters and story created by Edward Lee Cornett
- Produced by: David A. Armstrong; Edward Lee Cornett; William K. Baker; Brian Glazen; Joseph E. LoConti; Sean O'Brien
- Starring: Justin Chatwin; Peter Stormare; Mark Thompson; Robin Thomas; Yancy Butler
- Cinematography: Ed Wu
- Edited by: Sasha Dylan Bell
- Production companies: Think Media Studios; William Baker Films; Serious Stooges Films
- Distributed by: Gravitas Ventures
- Release dates: April 12, 2018 (CIFF); May 11, 2018 (Theatrical release)
- Running time: 95 minutes
- Country: United States
- Language: English
- Budget: $1.8 million

The Assassin's Code, previously entitled Legacy, is an American thriller film directed by David A. Armstrong and written by Edward Lee Cornett, who created the story and characters. The film stars Justin Chatwin, Peter Stormare and Mark Thompson. The film was released on May 11, 2018, in a limited release and through video on demand by Gravitas Ventures.

== Cast ==
- Justin Chatwin as Detective Michael Connelly
- Peter Stormare as Kurt Schlychter
- Mark Thompson as Captain Jack O'Brien
- Robin Thomas as Angelo Leonetti
- Yancy Butler as Laura Consolo
- Rich Grosso as Carmen Puccinaldi
- Elizabeth Anweis as Jia Connelly
- Dontez James as David Paris
- Matt O'Shea as Jimmy Marco
- Christopher Mele as Detective Brandt
- Allen O'Reilly as Steve Kitchen
- Jordan Whalen as Keller Abrams
- Melvin Bender as Ray Blaine
- Greg Violand as Kenny Cohen
- Lauren Ashley Berry as Detective Harris
- Edward Lee Cornett as Albert

== Production ==
The film was shot in Cleveland. Principal photography began on October 24, 2016, and ended on November 19.

== Release ==
The Assassin's Code premiered at the Cleveland International Film Festival on April 12, 2018. Gravitas Ventures acquired the domestic distribution rights and released the film on May 11, 2018, in select theaters and through video on demand.
