= Becoming (2020 horror film) =

2020 thriller by Omar Naim

- Film poster
- Directed by: Omar Naim
- Screenplay by: Omar Naim
- Produced by: Gabrielle Whyte Hart; Cole Payne; Michael Philip; Glen Reynolds; Stanley Preschutti
- Starring: Toby Kebbell; Penelope Mitchell; Jason Patric
- Cinematography: Matthew Irving
- Edited by: Russell Lichter
- Music by: Jacob Bunton
- Production company: Traverse Media
- Distributed by: Gravitas Ventures
- Release date: March 6, 2020
- Running time: 98 minutes
- Country: United States
- Language: English

Becoming is a 2020 science fiction horror drama film directed by Omar Naim. The film stars Toby Kebbell, Penelope Mitchell and Jason Patric. The film was released on 6 March 2020.

== Cast ==
- Toby Kebbell as Alex Ferri
- Penelope Mitchell as Lisa Corrigan
- Jason Patric as Kevin Lee
- Jeff Daniel Phillips as Glen Hemming
- Melissa Bolona as Annie Hemming
- Beth Broderick as Angela Corrigan
- Lew Temple as Elias Lee

== Production ==
Penelope Mitchell replaced Claire Holt in the movie at the last minute. The film is shot in Kentucky, United States.
