= Twilight: Director's Notebook =

2009 non-fiction book by Catherine Hardwicke

- Author: Catherine Hardwicke
- Original title: Twilight Director’s Notebook: The Story of How We Made the Movie Based on the Novel by Stephenie Meyer
- Language: English
- Genre: Non-fiction, notebook
- Publisher: Little, Brown and Company
- Publication date: 17 March 2009
- Publication place: United States
- Media type: Print (Hardcover), e-Book (Kindle)
- Pages: 176
- ISBN: 9780316070522
- LC Class: 2009922106

Twilight: Director's Notebook (also known as the Twilight Director’s Notebook: The Story of How We Made the Movie Based on the Novel by Stephenie Meyer) is a 2009 non-fiction notebook styled novel written by American filmmaker Catherine Hardwicke. The book acts a behind-the-scenes companion to the first Twilight film. It is a #1 New York Times Best seller.

== Content ==
The foreword is a short monologue by Hardwicke explaining how she first came into reading the novel and then directing the film. The novel is separated in 13 chapters, based in order of the events of the movie. The novel contains Hardwicke's annotations explaining behind-the-scenes photographs, concept art, casting decisions, and the shooting process. Once it was published, it was shelved in the Library of Congress.

== Promotion ==
The novel was used to promote Twilight's DVD and Blue-ray disc which was to be released on March 21, 2009. Announced on February 4, 2009, the novel was planned to be available for pre-order as Meyer gave it promotion on her official website. Readers could officially begin pre-ordering on February 5, 2009.

Entertainment Weekly did several promotional pieces, with releasing exclusive spreads of pages leading up to its release. For their official edition of February 2009, the magazine promoted that the edition was to feature these spreads and showcased Kristen Stewart and Robert Pattinson on the cover, as they'd also been promoting the DVD release.

In March 2009, Hardwicke had done an interview for the novel on Meyer's official site for fans. Hardwicke promoted the novel further by hosting a book signing event at Santa Monica High School on its release date.

== Reception ==
It remained on the New York Times Best Seller list for 23 weeks. The novel's reception from fan response would remain positive specifically among female filmmakers. In 2018, during a Closer Weekly interview, Hardwicke discussed how a woman approached her that because of the novel she'd been inspired to become director herself. It has been referred to as an archival source for the timeline of the film's creation.
