= Havenhurst =

- Film poster
- Directed by: Andrew C. Erin
- Written by: Andrew C. Erin; Daniel Farrands
- Produced by: Andrew C. Erin; Mark Burg
- Starring: Julie Benz; Fionnula Flanagan; Danielle Harris; Belle Shouse; Josh Stamberg; Toby Huss; Douglas Tait; Jennifer Blanc-Biehn
- Cinematography: Thomas Hencz
- Edited by: Todd Zelin
- Music by: tomandandy
- Production companies: Twisted Pictures; Protocol Entertainment
- Distributed by: Brainstorm Media
- Release dates: May 14, 2016 (Cannes Film Festival); February 10, 2017
- Running time: 80 minutes
- Country: United States
- Language: English

Havenhurst is a 2016 American horror film directed by Andrew C. Erin and starring Julie Benz, Fionnula Flanagan and Danielle Harris.

== Plot ==
Jackie is a recovering alcoholic moving into Havenhurst, an old gothic apartment complex in New York City run by Eleanor Mudgett and her son Ezra, who serves as the building's maintenance man. Jackie is warned that she must remain sober while living there or she will be evicted.

Jackie begins looking for evidence about her friend, previous Havenhurst tenant Danielle, unaware that she was brutally murdered along with her addict boyfriend Jason after receiving an eviction notice. Jackie meets some of the building's residents, notably a young teen named Sarah, who lives with her foster parents Tammy, a waitress who works nights, and Wayne, an abusive alcoholic. She later hears a neighbor, Paula, being murdered because she returned to prostitution. Jackie reports the incident to a detective friend, Tim Crawford.

She discovers an incomplete map that Danielle created before her death. The map shows that the building is far larger than it appears, as it has several secret rooms. Sarah gives Jackie Danielle's camera, which contains film that Jackie develops. Sarah is later attacked by Wayne, who is abducted by Eleanor's other son Jed. Jed is a serial killer that has been using the secret rooms to hide his crimes. He is the one murdering those who have been served eviction notices. Tammy becomes one of Jed's victims. After discovering their apartment covered in blood, Jackie tries to show Tim the apartment as proof, only for it to have been cleaned prior to his arrival. She decides to start drinking in order to receive an eviction notice and discover the building's secrets.

Jackie and Sarah, who is now living with her, discover a secret passage in the laundry room that leads to a room containing records showing that Eleanor and her children are descendants of serial killer H. H. Holmes and have inherited his murderous disposition. They are discovered by the murderous family and chased throughout the building, unable to leave. Jackie calls Tim for help but Sarah is captured. She manages to rescue Sarah and help her escape the building but is captured herself and presumably murdered.

Tim arrives shortly after with several police officers but is unable to do anything as there is no visible evidence that the disappearances are sinister in nature. Eleanor convinces Sarah to join her family (with all that entails), and Sarah agrees.

== Cast ==
- Julie Benz as Jackie
- Belle Shouse as Sarah
- Fionnula Flanagan as Eleanor Mudgett
- Danielle Harris as Danielle Hampton
- Josh Stamberg as Tim
- Toby Huss as Wayne
- Douglas Tait as Jed
- Jennifer Blanc-Biehn as Paula

== Development ==
Havenhurst was filmed from 28 April 2014 - 31 May 2014. The first trailer was released on February 24, 2016.

The name "Havenhurst" was chosen because of it features two uses of the letter H, similar to H.H. Holmes, who is featured in the film. Two days of filming occurred in New York City, with the rest taking place in Los Angeles. Buildings in New York's Tudor City were used as the Havenhurst exterior. The film's practical effects were created by the companies VGP Effects and Crafty Apes.

On December 16, 2016, it was confirmed that the film would open in limited release across New York City and Los Angeles on February 10, 2017.

== Release ==
The film was screened at the 2016 Berlin Film Festival.

== Reception ==
The film drew mixed reviews. As of January 2021, 27% of the eleven reviews compiled on Rotten Tomatoes are positive, with an average rating of 4.25/10. Variety awarded Havenhurst a marginally positive review, saying "a decent cast, brisk pace and proficient overall packaging make Havenhurst a respectable enough diversion within a niche." Dread Central awarded it a score of 7 out of 10, saying "the location, complemented by spooky cinematography (Thomas Hencz) and a score (tomandandy) that sizzles with suspense, is what really sells it."

Writing for The Los Angeles Times, Kimberly Byers gave the film a mostly negative review, stating "Havenhurst never has as much fun with its premise as it should, and it peaks before its final scenes. A reveal about the nature of the building and its violence works initially, but is never fully explored," and added, " There are some truly disgusting kills." That sentiment was echoed by Frank Scheck in The Hollywood Reporter, who dismissed the film as "Low-rent horror in a high-rent setting," and added, "The film’s technical elements are first-rate, including the production design and cinematography that evocatively convey the creepiness of the setting, and the tense musical score by the veteran film-scoring duo known as tomandandy. But despite the strong efforts of everyone involved, Havenhurst proves all too unimaginative in its formulaic recycling of genre tropes."
