= Hansel & Gretel Get Baked =

- Theatrical release poster
- Directed by: Duane Journey
- Written by: David Tillman
- Produced by: James Cotten; Michael Pollack; Curtis Sobel; Mark Morgan; Brett Hudson; E. Thompson
- Starring: Michael Welch; Molly Quinn; Lara Flynn Boyle; Cary Elwes
- Cinematography: John Smith
- Edited by: Sean Yates
- Music by: Corey Allen Jackson; Zak Sobel
- Distributed by: Tribeca Film; Jinga Films
- Release date: February 19, 2013
- Running time: 86 minutes
- Country: United States
- Language: English
- Budget: $4.5 million

Hansel & Gretel Get Baked (also known as Black Forest: Hansel and Gretel and the 420 Witch) is a 2013 American comedy horror film from Mark Morgan, producer of The Twilight Saga film series, inspired by the German fairy tale "Hansel and Gretel". Directed by Duane Journey, it stars Michael Welch, Molly Quinn and Lara Flynn Boyle. The film was released in theaters and on VOD on February 19, 2013.

== Plot ==
Gretel's boyfriend Ashton introduces her to a strain of marijuana called "Black Forest" which is produced by an old lady named Agnes in Pasadena. After Gretel exhorts him to get more, Ashton visits Agnes where he is drugged and realizes Agnes is a witch. She then proceeds to eat parts of Ashton's body and eventually sucks out his youth (which restores her youth in turn). Gretel and her brother Hansel begin searching for Ashton, but they are ridiculed by the police and the trail ends with Agnes, who reveals nothing.

Meanwhile, local drug kingpin Carlos intimidates Agnes' dealer Manny into giving him the address of her house. Manny finds Agnes first to warn her about Carlos but is killed by her. When Carlos arrives, she easily dispatches Carlos and turns him into a zombie. The next morning, Gretel and Manny's girlfriend Bianca decide to infiltrate Agnes' house. Before they leave, Gretel emails Hansel that she is going to confront Agnes again.

While Bianca distracts Agnes through various means, Gretel sneaks into the basement where she finds the Black Forest crop, and the remains of the men Agnes has killed. Gretel leaves a trail of Skittles to help her find her way through the Black Forest. Eventually, Agnes sees through the ruse and the two girls are captured. Hansel shows up and is confronted by Carlos. Although Hansel defeats the zombified Carlos, he is knocked out by Agnes and placed in the oven room for cooking preparation.

Gretel and Bianca break out of their cage and stop Agnes right before she cooks Hansel, but Agnes manages to kill Bianca. During the struggle, Gretel pushes Agnes into the oven and locks her in. The oven explodes, causing the marijuana crop and house to burn down. Hansel and Gretel manage to escape.

As various first responders arrive at the scene, one of them picks up a cat strolling in the ashes into his van. The responder then screams in agony as he is slaughtered in his van. Agnes is now behind the wheel and drives away from the scene.

== Cast ==
- Michael Welch as Hansel Jaeger
- Molly Quinn as Gretel Jaeger
- Lara Flynn Boyle as Agnes/The Witch
- Lochlyn Munro as Officer Ritter
- Yancy Butler as Officer Hart
- Cary Elwes as a Meter Man
- Bianca Saad as Bianca
- Reynaldo Gallegos as Carlos
- Celestino Cornielle as Octavio (credited as Celestin Cornielle)
- Joe Ordaz as Jorge
- Eddy Martin as Manny
- Andrew James Allen as Ashton Crawford
- Edward Zo as Teenager #1
- Doug Haley as Teenager #2
- David Tillman as Norm
- Danielle Adams as a Paramedic
- Lexie Hofer as Coed #1
- Orvis Slack as a Paramedic

== Producers ==
The end credits list Boyle and Quinn (Note: Quinn's name is given as Molly Quinn in her credit as Gretel, and as Molly C. Quinn in her credit as associate producer.) as associate producers.

== Release ==
Hansel & Gretel Get Baked was released in select theaters and on VOD on February 19, 2013.

== See also ==
- List of films about witchcraft
