= Stanley Preschutti =

American Producer and inventor

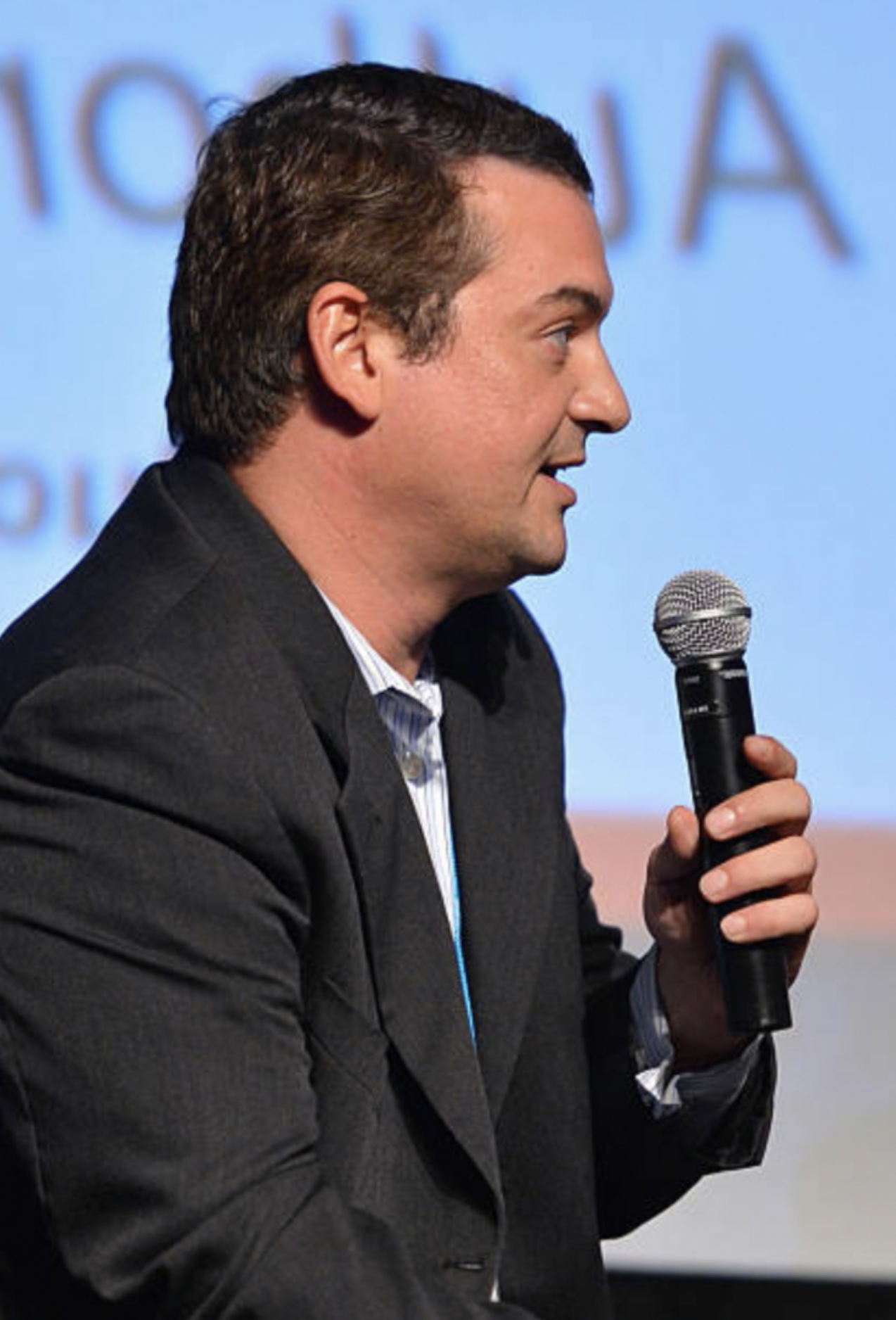
- Preschutti presents at the 3D Summit in Hollywood, California in September 2012
- Born: Centre County, Pennsylvania, U.S.
- Occupations: Producer; Inventor
- Years active: 2019–present

Stanley Preschutti is an American film producer and technology executive. Preschutti presented new 3D entertainment technology at the 3D Summit in Hollywood, California, in September 2012. In 2021, Lionsgate announced the distribution of Preschutti's film, The Virtuoso, starring Anthony Hopkins. Preschutti is best known as the executive producer on the film, Paradise City, starring Bruce Willis and John Travolta, which is their fourth film together, after Look Who's Talking, Look Who's Talking Too, and Pulp Fiction.

He is also known for producing Doorman, A Violent Separation, Long Gone Heroes, Becoming, Girl, Dead Trigger, Ripped, Extracurricular, and Villain. In March 2018, Preschutti was announced as executive producer for the independent movie Think Like a Dog starring Josh Duhamel alongside Megan Fox. On June 19, 2020, Deadline Hollywood announced Preschutti as an executive producer on Paul Schrader's The Card Counter, alongside Martin Scorsese, through Focus Features. On November 10, 2020, Variety announced Preschutti as an executive producer on an action-thriller "Panama project" at the Toronto International Film Festival, starring Mel Gibson and Cole Hauser.

== Film finance and film festivals ==
Preschutti is known for film finance and theatrical motion picture development. Preschutti has represented Double Dutch International sales agency at the Cannes Film Festival.

== Personal life ==
Preschutti lives in Los Angeles, California.
