= The Final Cut (2004 film) =

- Theatrical release poster
- Directed by: Omar Naim
- Written by: Omar Naim
- Produced by: Nick Wechsler
- Starring: Robin Williams; Mira Sorvino; Jim Caviezel; Mimi Kuzyk; Stephanie Romanov; Genevieve Buechner; Brendan Fletcher
- Cinematography: Tak Fujimoto
- Edited by: Dede Allen; Robert Brakey
- Music by: Brian Tyler
- Distributed by: Lions Gate Films
- Release date: October 15, 2004
- Running time: 95 minutes
- Countries: United States; Canada; Germany
- Language: English
- Box office: $3.6 million

The Final Cut is a 2004 science fiction psychological thriller film written and directed by Omar Naim. It stars Robin Williams, Jim Caviezel, Mira Sorvino, Mimi Kuzyk, Stephanie Romanov, Genevieve Buechner and Brendan Fletcher. The film takes place in a setting where brain implants make it possible to record the sight and sound of entire lives. Williams plays a professional who specializes in editing the memories of unsavory people into uncritical memorials that are played at funerals.

The film won the award for best screenplay at the Deauville American Film Festival and was nominated for best film at the Sitges Film Festival and Berlin International Film Festival.

== Plot ==
"Cutters" edit the collected memories of the recently deceased into feature-length memorials that are viewed by loved ones at funerals. The "cutters code" forbids them to mix footage from implants, to sell memories, and to have the implant themselves.

Ten-year-old Alan Hakman, while visiting a city with his parents, meets another boy, Louis, and the two bond as they play together. Louis reluctantly joins Hakman in exploring an abandoned factory, and Hakman crosses a wooden plank suspended high above the ground. Goaded by Hakman, Louis also attempts to cross the plank, but he loses his confidence and falls. Hakman races to the ground and panics when he steps in what he thinks is Louis's blood. Hakman flees the scene and tells no one what has happened. Later that day, he leaves the city with his parents.

Years later, the adult Hakman has become a skilled cutter who specializes in editing the memories of controversial people into flattering life stories. When Fletcher, a former cutter, confronts him at a funeral, Hakman describes himself as a sin-eater, who brings redemption to the immoral. Fletcher offers him $500,000 for the memories of his latest client, wealthy businessman Charles Bannister, but Hakman refuses. In a meeting, Fletcher demands the memory recordings so that he can use Bannister, who he suspects was a pedophile, as a scandal to shut down EYE Tech, the implant manufacturer. Hakman again refuses and, worried for his safety, uses his knowledge from memory tapes to shake down a shady criminal for a pistol.

As Hakman works through Bannister's memories, he encounters a scene that implies that Bannister was molesting his daughter Isabel, and Hakman wordlessly deletes it. He eventually comes across a person who he is convinced must be his childhood friend Louis. Excited, he sets up a meeting with Bannister's family to find out more information. Bannister's wife Jennifer is dismissive, but Isabel reveals that the man, recently dead of a car crash, was a teacher named Louis Hunt. Hoping that Hunt had an implant, Hakman organizes a break-in at EYE Tech, but they have no record of Hunt. However, Hakman surprisingly finds a file on himself that contains documentation of his parents' purchase of an implant for him.

In his distress, Hakman turns to his lover, Delila. At his apartment, he shows her the equipment that he uses to view memories, and he demonstrates surreal footage from a defective implant. He leaves her alone as he seeks help from anti-implant protestors, who have discovered a way to block the implant through specialized body modification. When he returns to find his apartment in disarray, he assumes that Fletcher has broken in; instead, Delila confronts him, having found memory tapes that document her prior relationship. She accuses him of voyeurism and angrily destroys his memory viewer, which results in Bannister's files also being damaged.

Fletcher and his associate finally break in, but they find nothing. Hakman tells Bannister's wife that the erased footage was lost in an accident, and she feigns disappointment, content to let dirty secrets stay hidden. Hakman asks his colleagues to recover live footage from his own implant, a potentially deadly process. They agree but admonish him that he can never cut memories again; a cutter with an implant is a violation of the "Cutter's code". The recorded memories show that Hakman had attempted to dissuade Louis from crossing the plank, and that he had stepped in red paint, not blood. Hakman, relieved, visits Hunt's grave but is confronted again by Fletcher, who has learned about Hakman's implant. After chasing Hakman through the graveyard, he hesitates and seems willing to let Hakman go; however, Fletcher's associate kills Hakman.

Fletcher loads Hakman's memories (which contain the memories of everyone he had viewed as a cutter) into a viewer and promises to use them for the greater good. As he pages through Hakman's memories, looking for evidence of Bannister's guilt, he sees the young Hakman looking in a mirror.

== Cast ==
- Robin Williams as Alan Hakman
- Mira Sorvino as Delila
- Jim Caviezel as Fletcher
- Mimi Kuzyk as Thelma
- Stephanie Romanov as Jennifer Bannister
- Thom Bishops as Hasan
- Genevieve Buechner as Isabel Bannister
- Brendan Fletcher as Michael
- Joely Collins as Legz the Tattoo Artist
- Michael St. John Smith as Charles Bannister
- Christopher Britton as Jason Monroe

== Release ==
The Final Cut premiered on October 15, 2004. It grossed $548,039 domestically and $3,070,786 internationally. Lionsgate Home Entertainment released it on DVD on March 22, 2005.

== Reception ==
The Final Cut received mixed reviews from critics. Rotten Tomatoes, a review aggregator, reports that 38% of 80 surveyed critics gave the film a positive review. The site's critical consensus reads: "The Final Cut fails to make compelling use of its intriguing premise and talented cast, settling for a middling sci-fi drama that never justifies its pretensions." On Metacritic, the film holds a score of 43 out of 100 based on 22 critics, indicating "mixed or average reviews".

Roger Ebert of the Chicago Sun-Times rated it 3 stars out of 4, and wrote that "the movie never really finds its way out of the dilemmas it has created", but found that Williams's performance saved it from these issues.

Leslie Felperin of Variety wrote that it has "strong visuals" but called it clichéd and poorly acted.

Stephen Holden of The New York Times wrote that it is poorly edited and features an emotionless performance from Williams.

Kevin Thomas of the Los Angeles Times wrote that the film fails to deliver on its promising premise.

Daniel W. Kelly of DVD Talk rated it 4½ stars out of 5, and called it "an intriguing, unassuming drama with sci-fi elements that doesn't get bogged down in sci-fi overkill".

== See also ==
- List of films featuring surveillance
- Sousveillance
- "The Entire History of You"
