= Andrew C. Erin =

Canadian film director

Andrew C. Erin is a Canadian-born film director. Erin is best known for his film Sam's Lake, starring Sandrine Holt. Sam's Lake is a thriller/horror film released in 2006.

Sam's Lake marks Andrew C. Erin's feature debut following six years of writing, directing, and producing Canadian TV pilots, series, and short films. Following Sam's Lake, which was produced by Mirovision/Maverick Films, Erin wrote and directed his second feature, Simple Things, a drama set in North Carolina. In 2008 he co-wrote and directed Toxic Skies.

== Filmography ==
- Sam's Lake (2006)
- Simple Things (2007)
- Toxic Skies (2008)
- Tornado Valley (TV movie, 2009)
- Confined (2010)
- A Borrowed Life (2011)
- Final Sale (2011)
- Borderline Murder (TV movie, 2011)
- Playdate (TV movie, 2012)
- Havenhurst (2016)
