= The Stepfather (2009 film) =

2009 American film by Nelson McCormick

- Theatrical release poster
- Directed by: Nelson McCormick
- Screenplay by: J.S. Cardone
- Based on: The Stepfather by: Donald E. Westlake; Carolyn Starin; Brian Garfield
- Produced by: Mark Morgan; Greg Mooradian
- Starring: Dylan Walsh; Sela Ward; Penn Badgley; Amber Heard; Jon Tenney
- Cinematography: Patrick Cady
- Edited by: Eric L. Beason
- Music by: Charlie Clouser
- Production companies: Screen Gems; Maverick Films; Imprint Entertainment; Granada Film Productions
- Distributed by: Sony Pictures Releasing
- Release date: October 16, 2009
- Running time: 101 minutes
- Country: United States
- Language: English
- Budget: $20 million
- Box office: $31.2 million

The Stepfather is a 2009 American psychological horror film directed by Nelson McCormick. It is the fourth installment in The Stepfather film series and is a remake of the 1987 film of the same name which was loosely based on the crimes of mass murderer John List. The film stars Dylan Walsh, Sela Ward, Penn Badgley, Amber Heard and Jon Tenney.

The Stepfather was released in the United States by Sony Pictures Releasing on October 16, 2009. The film received negative reviews from critics and grossed $31 million against its $20 million budget.

== Plot ==
In a suburban Utah house, Grady Edwards shaves off his beard, dyes his hair, and removes his brown contact lenses. As he leaves, it is revealed that he has murdered his wife and three children. When the police investigate, it is said that another family in New Jersey was murdered in a similar manner not long ago, which causes them to believe there is a serial killer on the loose.

Susan Harding, a recently divorced Oregon housewife, is shopping in a grocery store with her youngest children when she meets Grady, who introduces himself as "David Harris", and claims that his wife and daughter were killed in a car accident. Susan, desperate for love, is charmed by David, and rushes into an engagement to be married in less than six months.

Susan's eldest son, Michael, returns home from military school and is immediately suspicious of his mother's new fiancé. David invites him down to the basement, where he has installed locked cabinets and befriends him over tequila shots.

However, Michael's suspicions start when David uses the wrong name when mentioning his deceased daughter. After Susan says that a neighbor warned her that America's Most Wanted ran a profile on a serial killer who looks like David, he sneaks into the neighbor's house, throws her down the basement stairs, then suffocates her.

Jay, Susan's ex-husband, angrily confronts David over physically abusing his son Sean. He warns Susan that she knows nothing about him. Doubts about David mount further when he quits his job working as a real estate agent for Susan's sister, Jackie, to avoid displaying a photo ID and other forms of identification.

Later, Jay confronts David about an apparent lie regarding his college history. David clubs him with a vase and suffocates him with a plastic bag. He texts Michael with Jay's phone saying that David checked out okay.

When the neighbor's body is discovered two weeks later, David tells the family. Michael is alarmed because he overheard David being told by the mailman, who gave less detail than David tells them. While Michael's girlfriend Kelly tries to get him to focus on college applications, he grows more obsessed with the contradictions in David's stories. The situation comes to a head when David intercepts an email from Jackie about hiring an investigator. He then goes to her house and drowns her in her pool.

Determined to discover what is in the locked cabinets, Michael breaks into the basement as Kelly keeps a lookout. Michael eventually discovers his dad's body in a freezer. David knocks out Kelly and traps Michael in the basement.

The commotion awakens Susan, and David berates her parenting skills, saying that he thought she could be "Mrs. Grady Edwards". On Susan's stunned reaction, he grimaces and asks, "Who am I here?" Susan tries to snap him out of it, causing him to say, "David! I'm David Harris!"

Susan, realizing the situation after noticing the unconscious Kelly, flees to the bathroom, locking herself in. David kicks the door in, shattering the mirror behind it. Susan picks up a shard of the mirror, holding it behind her. David grabs her, they struggle, and she manages to stab him in the neck with the shard. He falls into the bathtub, apparently dead.

Michael escapes from the basement and finds Kelly. They find Susan in the hallway across from the bathroom, thinking David is dead. Then David approaches from behind and blocks the stairs, chasing all of them into the attic, where he and Michael fight. Both fall onto the roof and then off its edge to the ground, where they lie unconscious.

When Michael wakes up, he finds out he has been in a coma for just over a month. He learns that David is still alive and fled the scene before the police arrived. The end scene shows David, who has again changed his appearance and his name to Chris Ames. He is working at a hardware store when he meets a woman who is shopping with her two sons.

== Cast ==
- Dylan Walsh as Grady Edwards / David Harris / Chris Ames / The Stepfather
- Sela Ward as Susan Harding
- Penn Badgley as Michael Harding
- Amber Heard as Kelly Porter
- Sherry Stringfield as Leah
- Paige Turco as Jackie Kerns
- Jon Tenney as Jay Harding
- Nancy Linehan Charles as Mrs. Cutter
- Marcuis Harris as Detective Shay
- Braeden Lemasters as Sean Harding
- Deirdre Lovejoy as Detective Tylar
- Skyler Samuels as Beth Harding

== Production ==
Terry O'Quinn, who portrayed the stepfather in the 1987 original and its 1989 sequel, was approached by director Nelson McCormick to appear in the remake in a cameo role, but according to producer Mark Morgan, O'Quinn turned down the offer. Filming was completed on April 15, 2008.

== Release ==
=== Theatrical ===
The film was distributed by Screen Gems. It was released in cinemas on October 16, 2009.

=== Home media ===
Sony Pictures Home Entertainment released the film to DVD and Blu-ray on a special Unrated Directors Cut containing a few more special features and depicting each death in the film in a more graphic tone.

== Reception ==
=== Box office ===
It grossed $29.1 million in North America and $2.1 million in other territories, for a worldwide gross of $31.2 million, against its budget of $20 million. The film opened #5 at the box office, grossing $11.6 million in 2,734 theaters, with an average of $4,236 per theater.

=== Critical response ===
On the review aggregator website Rotten Tomatoes, 13% of 63 critics' reviews are positive, with an average rating of 3.5/10. The website's consensus reads: "This tepid remake of the 1987 cult classic lacks the tension and satirical undercurrents of the original." Metacritic, which uses a weighted average, assigned the film a score of 33 out of 100, based on 11 critics, indicating "generally unfavorable" reviews. Audiences polled by CinemaScore gave the film an average grade of "B−" on an A+ to F scale.

Kirk Honeycutt of The Hollywood Reporter wrote: "This remake turns a fondly remembered horror/thriller into a mild and tedious suspense film." Kevin Thomas of the Los Angeles Times wrote of the film being "a handsome, thoughtfully crafted production that generates a mounting terror securely anchored by assured performances, consistent psychological persuasiveness and believable dialogue."
