= Apotamkin =

Creature in Native American Mythology

The Apotamkin (/äbudämkɪn/, ah-boo-dahm-kin) is a creature in Maliseet and Passamaquoddy mythology. It is described a giant fanged sea monster that lives in the Passamaquoddy Bay, specifically at the mouth of St. Croix River, and pulls people in to eat them, particularly careless children.

== Description ==
The Apotamkin is sometimes described as being humanoid, and sometimes as having a fully fish body with human hair. It is consistently said to have long red hair, and in some versions, it was a human woman before being changed into a serpent. In 1888, the Journal of American Folklore described it as similar to a mermaid. Whilst it is defined as a monster, it is not always evil. Its presence deters children from entering the water without parental supervision, avoiding injuries or death. The Passamaquoddy tribe believe that the Apotamkin prevents children from falling through thin ice. The Apotamkin has been compared to the Ponca legend of the Indaciga.

Legends from the Pacific Northwest also have a monster called an Apotamkin. This version is tall and apelike as opposed to aquatic, with orange-brown hair and fur. It is said that its cry is so terrifying as to give a person a heart attack on the spot.

Both the Northeast and Northwest versions of the Apotamkin were bogyman figures used to instill fear into children to keep them from venturing dangerous areas alone.

== Popular culture and legacy ==
The Pacific Northwest version of the Apotamkin appears in Stephenie Meyer's Twilight series. Because of this, it is sometimes assumed to be a vampiric creature.

Writer-director Carly Sappier of the Tobique First Nation released a 2017 short film called APOTAMKIN based on stories of the creature she had been told by elders. The film stars Ciara John and Riaan Smit and was produced by Eveleen Kozak. It premiered at the Laemmle Monica Film Center in Santa Monica.
