= Dead Awake (2010 film) =

- Directed by: Omar Naim
- Produced by: Lucas Jarach; Nesim Hason
- Starring: Nick Stahl; Rose McGowan; Amy Smart
- Cinematography: David A. Armstrong
- Edited by: Miklos Wright
- Music by: John Hunter
- Production company: First Look Studios
- Release date: December 3, 2010
- Running time: 93 minutes
- Country: United States
- Budget: $3.5 million

Dead Awake is a 2010 American mystery film starring Nick Stahl, Rose McGowan, and Amy Smart. The film was previously titled Dylan's Wake.

== Plot ==
Dylan (Stahl) tries to unravel the answer to a decade-long mystery by staging his own funeral and examining who shows up. The problem is, Dylan might actually be dead.

== Cast ==
- Nick Stahl as Dylan
- Rose McGowan as Charlie
- Amy Smart as Natalie
- Ben Marten as Steve
- Shane Simmons as David

== Production ==
Filming took place in the Fall of 2009, in Des Moines, Iowa, and was released in December 2010 to mixed reviews. Mark Olsen of the Los Angeles Times said in his review; "Though the performers gamely try to make the most of what little they have to work with, the film is murky to look at and unfocused in its storytelling. "Dead Awake" is a deadly snore." Positive marks came from the NYC Movie Guru, who called the film "an intriguing blend of mystery, suspense, drama and supernatural thrills that slightly loses steam as its trust in the audience's intelligence wanes."
