= Pawn (2013 film) =

- Film poster
- Directed by: David A. Armstrong
- Written by: Jerome Anthony White
- Produced by: Michael Becker; Michael Chiklis; Brad Luff; Jeff Most
- Starring: Michael Chiklis; Common; Marton Csokas; Sean Faris; Stephen Lang; Ray Liotta; Nikki Reed; Forest Whitaker
- Edited by: Jordan Goldman; Danny Saphire
- Music by: Jacob Yoffee
- Distributed by: Anchor Bay Films
- Release date: September 19, 2013
- Running time: 88 minutes
- Country: United States
- Language: English
- Box office: $4,141

Pawn is a 2013 American crime thriller film directed by David A. Armstrong in his directorial debut and written by Jerome Anthony White.

== Plot ==
An old gangster, with a hard drive containing records of who he paid off, is targeted by a competition between dirty cops, internal affairs, etc. The dirty cops hire a thug to get into the safe (in the back of a diner) at midnight. He brings his friends and is too early for the time-release lock. Another crooked cop shows up (for uncertain reasons). The shooting ensues and during hostage negotiations the thug tries to put the blame onto an ex-con who just got out of jail, so that no one notices the real target is the hard drive.

== Cast ==
- Forest Whitaker as Sgt. Will Tompkins
- Michael Chiklis as Derrick
- Stephen Lang as Charlie
- Ray Liotta as Man in the Suit
- Nikki Reed as Amanda Davenport
- Common as Jeff Porter
- Marton Csokas as Lt. Eric Barnes
- Max Beesley as Billy
- Jonathan Bennett as Aaron
- Cameron Denny as Nigel
- Jessica Szohr as Bonnie Petrowski
- Sean Faris as Nick Davenport
- Ronald Guttman as Yuri Mikhailov
- Jordan Belfi as Lt. Patrick Davenport
- Deborah Twiss as Mrs. Davenport
