= Jack Swanstrom =

American film director

Jack D. Swanstrom
- Born: John Swanstrom; 1961/2
- Died: 4 March 2015 (aged 53); Sharjah, United Arab Emirates
- Notable work: A.W.O.L

John "Jack" Swanstrom (1961/2 – March 4, 2015) was an American educator and film director. He has a Master of Fine Arts in directing from the AFI Conservatory and a Master of Arts in Theatre from Humboldt State University.

During the Gulf War, he served with Team 45, Detachment 1 of the 354th Civil Affairs Brigade. He was awarded the Army Commendation Medal for service during Operation Desert Shield and the Bronze Star Medal for Operation Desert Storm.

Swanstrom was an assistant professor of film and design in the College of Architecture, Art and Design (CAAD) in the American University of Sharjah from 2002 until his death in 2015.

His films have screened at over 130 film festivals worldwide, including the 60th, 64th, 65th, and 66th annual Cannes Film Festival.

== Filmography ==
=== Directing ===
- 1993: Saint Crispin's Day
- 1995: Lead the Way (ranger!)
- 1997: The Way to Santiago
- 2006: A.W.O.L.
- 2010: The Ranger from Kelly Street
- 2012: Bu Qtair
- 2013: Four Days

=== Producing ===
- 1993: Saint Crispin's Day (producer)
- 1995: Lead the Way (ranger!) (producer)
- 1998: A Short Wait Between Trains (associate producer)
- 2006: A.W.O.L. (executive producer)
- 2010 The Ranger from Kelly Street (producer)
- 2011: Meanwhile (co-producer)
- 2011: No Wine Left Behind (associate producer)
- 2012: Martin Hill: Cameraman (executive producer)
- 2012: Bu Qtair (producer)
- 2013: Four Days (producer)
- 2013: Tatanka (co-producer)

=== Death ===
John Swanstrom died on March 4, 2015, at his home.
