= Sam's Lake =

- Directed by: Andrew C. Erin
- Written by: Andrew C. Erin
- Produced by: E. Thompson; Amy Green
- Starring: Sandrine Holt; Fay Masterson
- Cinematography: Jordan Cushing
- Distributed by: Lionsgate Films
- Release dates: April 2006 (Tribeca); 30 January 2009
- Running time: 92 minutes
- Countries: Canada; United States
- Language: English

Sam's Lake is a horror film written and directed by Andrew C. Erin which premiered in 2006 at the Tribeca Film Festival. The film was based on actual events that took place at Sam's Lake, Ontario. Starring Sandrine Holt, Fay Masterson, and William Gregory Lee, the film was shot at ten locations in Nanaimo, Nanaimo Lakes, Cedar, and Yellow Point, British Columbia.

== Synopsis ==
Near an isolated lake, an escaped psychiatric patient makes his way through the forest to his childhood home where he kills his family in their sleep before disappearing into the woods never to be found. Many years later the massacre has become legend as disappearances haunt the surrounding towns.

Sam (Fay Masterson), a young woman who comes back home every summer to the secluded lakeside cottage where she grew up, returns after the death of her father to reconnect with her traditions, old friends and memories of the past. This year, a group of hip, young urbanites, Kate (Sandrine Holt), Franklin (Stephen Bishop), Melanie (Megan Fahlenbock) and Dominik (Salvatore Antonio) join Sam on her annual trip. But when Sam and her friend Jesse (William Gregory Lee), a local to the area, take the group on an adventure to revisit the site of the murders they all come face to face with the terrifying legend of Sam's Lake.

== Cast ==
- Fay Masterson as Sam
- Sandrine Holt as Kate
- William Gregory Lee as Jesse
- Megan Fahlenbock as Melanie
- Stephen Bishop as Franklin
- Salvatore Antonio as Dominik
