= Omar Naim =

Lebanese film director and screenwriter (born 1977)

Omar Naim II
- Born: 27 September 1977 (age 48); Amman, Jordan
- Other names: Omar Naïm
- Occupations: Film director, screenwriter
- Years active: 1998–present

Omar Naim (Arabic: عمر نعيم; born 27 September 1977) is a Lebanese film director and screenwriter best known for writing and directing the 2004 film The Final Cut.

== Life and career ==
=== Early life and education ===
Omar Naim was born in Jordan to a Lebanese journalist father and the renowned Lebanese actress and playwright mother Nidal Al-Ashkar. Growing up surrounded by artists, musicians and writers, Naim had a childhood enriched with art and culture. His parents were both in theater and film. His mother, Nidal Al-Ashkar, the matriarch of Lebanese theater, is the founder of Masrah Al-Madina (The City Theater) where she was decorated by the French government in 1997 with a Knight Grade Decoration of Arts and Letters.

Naim had his first film-going experience at 14. As he grew more and more fascinated with the world of cinema, he became more interested in nurturing the abilities of writing and visuals. As an aspiring filmmaker, Naim was mostly inspired by directors like Martin Scorsese, Woody Allen, Oliver Stone and Spike Lee.

With the help of the Fares Foundation, Naim went on to study film at Emerson College in Boston, Massachusetts. During his four-year education at Emerson, Naim created a number of short films, among which figures his 1999 thesis, a 28-minute documentary titled Grand Theater: A Tale of Beirut. In this work, Naim puts the spotlight on Beirut's historic Grand Theater, which was torn in a violent no-man's land between two bellicose sides in the Lebanese civil war. The theater serves as a metaphorical illustration for the civil war. Through the eyes of the old theater, the different tales of actors, directors, soldiers and civilians are woven together at the Grand Theater. As war escalates in scale and absurdity, the lines between war and theater, as well as between show and reality, become blurred. The film earned Naim several awards at Emerson, an Honorable Mention, and played at a number of international festivals. Naim was also a finalist for the Student Oscar given by the AMPAS in 2000. Above all, and perhaps most importantly, this film earned the young director loaded hands-on experience he needed to be able to tackle his next giant project, which was still dormant at that time. Naim stated, "I learned everything making that film, from inception to print".

=== Career ===
In 2004, Naim wrote and directed his first feature film, The Final Cut, which starred Robin Williams, Mira Sorvino, and Jim Caviezel. Tak Fujimoto oversaw the cinematography. The film won the best screenplay award at the Deauville Film Festival and was an official selection of the Berlin Film Festival.

Naim stated that "The Final Cut is about editing and memory". He also said that his Lebanese origins also influenced the film's plot. "It's the Lebanese notion of mass memory, and people's very subjective memory and view of the world," he explains. "This subsequently dictates how society functions. I extrapolated that into sci-fi theory".

Naim sent his script to the French project Equinox, where hundreds of screenwriters from around the world submit film scripts. Only ten are chosen and are flown into Bordeaux to work on their screenplay with a group of experts for a week. Naim was one of the ten and was then fixed with an agent. Upon his arrival, Naim made it clear that he wanted to direct his film, wanting no one else to do so. Naim was allotted the post of director; once he returned to the United States, the script was greenlit by Lionsgate Entertainment.

As Lionsgate was recruiting actors, Robin Williams expressed interest in playing the lead role of Alan Hakman. Having loved the script, Williams told Naim that what really "struck" him was the "sense of mortality, something [he] hadn't explored as an actor before". Within weeks, the rest of the cast and crew was hired. The film was shot on 35mm film in Vancouver, British Columbia, Canada and was described by Naim as a harmonious, organized 35-day shoot "with no problems whatsoever".

== Recognition ==
Won

- Deauville Film Festival, 2004: Best Screenplay for The Final Cut
- New England Film and Video Festival, 2000: Honorable Mention for Grand Theater: A Tale of Beirut

Nominations

- Berlin International Film Festival, 2004: Golden Berlin Bear for The Final Cut
- Deauville Film Festival, 2004: Grand Special Prize for The Final Cut
- Sitges - Catalan International Film Festival, 2004: Best Film for The Final Cut

== Filmography ==
Director

- When Simon Sleeps (1999)
- Grand Theater: A Tale of Beirut (1999)
- The Final Cut (2004) (as Omar Naïm)
- Stand Up: Muslim-American Comics Come of Age (2009) (co-director)
- Dead Awake (2010)
- Becoming (2020 film) writer and director
- Two Cities (Madinataan), (2021 film)
- The Empty Quarter (2021 film), writer and director

Writer

- The Final Cut (2004) (written by) (as Omar Naïm)

Producer

- Grand Theater: A Tale of Beirut (1999) (producer)

Editor

- Grand Theater: A Tale of Beirut (1999)
- When Simon Sleeps (1999)
